= Prince Edward (Province of Canada electoral district) =

Province of Canada electoral district

Prince Edward Canada West
Province of Canada electoral district

Defunct pre-Confederation electoral district
- Legislature: Legislative Assembly of the Province of Canada
- District created: 1841
- District abolished: 1867
- First contested: 1841
- Last contested: 1863

Prince Edward was an electoral district of the Legislative Assembly of the Parliament of the Province of Canada, in Canada West (now Ontario). It was created in 1841, upon the establishment of the Province of Canada by the union of Upper Canada and Lower Canada. Prince Edward was represented by one member in the Legislative Assembly. It was abolished in 1867, upon the creation of Canada and the province of Ontario.

== Boundaries ==
Prince Edward electoral district was based on Prince Edward County, which occupied a large presque-isle on the north shore of Lake Ontario, south of the Bay of Quinte. The portage or carrying-place on the isthmus is now a National Historic Site.

The Union Act, 1840 had merged the two provinces of Upper Canada and Lower Canada into the Province of Canada, with a single Parliament. The separate parliaments of Lower Canada and Upper Canada were abolished. The Union Act provided that the pre-existing electoral boundaries of Upper Canada would continue to be used in the new Parliament, unless altered by the Union Act itself.

Prince Edward had been an electoral district in the Legislative Assembly of Upper Canada, and its boundaries were not altered by the Union Act. Those boundaries had originally been set by a proclamation of the first Lieutenant Governor of Upper Canada, John Graves Simcoe, in 1792:

That the tenth of the said counties be hereafter called by the name of the county of Prince Edward; which county is to be bounded on the south by lake Ontario, on the west by the carrying-place on the isthmus of the Presque isle d'Quinte, on the north by the bay of Quinte, and on the east, from point Pleasant to point Traverse, by its several shores and bays, including the late township of Ameliasburg, Sophiasburg, and Marysburg. The said county of Prince Edward is to comprehend all the islands in the said lake Ontario and bay of Quinte nearest to the said county, in the whole or greater part fronting the same.

The boundaries had been further defined by a statute of Upper Canada in 1798:

That the townships of Ameliasburg, Hallowell, Sophiasburg and Marysburg, with such of the Islands in the Bay of Quinté and Lake Ontario as are wholly or in greater part opposite thereto, and such as were not formerly included in the County of Ontario, do constitute and form the County of Prince Edward.

Since Prince Edward was not changed by the Union Act, those boundaries continued to be used for the new electoral district. Prince Edward was represented by one member in the Legislative Assembly.

== Members of the Legislative Assembly ==
Prince Edward was represented by one member in the Legislative Assembly. The following were the members for Prince Edward.

Parliament	Years	Members	Party
1st Parliament; 1841–1844	1841–1844	John Philip Roblin (Note: Resigned in May 1846 following appointment as Collector of Customs at Picton, Canada West.)	Unionist; Moderate Reformer
2nd Parliament; 1844–1847	1844–1846	John Philip Roblin	Unionist; Moderate Reformer

== Abolition ==
Prince Edward electoral district was abolished on July 1, 1867, when the British North America Act, 1867 came into force, creating Canada and splitting the Province of Canada into Quebec and Ontario. It was succeeded by the electoral districts of Prince Edward in both the House of Commons of Canada and the Legislative Assembly of Ontario.
