= John Philip Roblin =

Politician in Upper Canada and Province of Canada

Member of the Legislative Assembly of Upper Canada for Prince Edward County
- In office 1830–1836 Serving with Asa Werden (1831–1834); James Wilson (1834–1836)
- Preceded by: James Wilson; Paul Peterson
- Succeeded by: James Rogers Armstrong; Charles Bochus

Member of the Legislative Assembly of the Province of Canada for Prince Edward
- In office 1841–1846
- Preceded by: New position
- Succeeded by: Roger Bates Conger

Personal details
- Born: August 16, 1799 Sophiasburgh Township, Upper Canada
- Died: November 12, 1874 (aged 75) Picton, Ontario
- Party: Reformer
- Relations: John Roblin (uncle); David Roblin (cousin)
- Occupation: Farmer

Military service
- Allegiance: Britain
- Branch/service: Upper Canada militia
- Rank: Lieutenant-Colonel
- Unit: 2nd Battalion, Prince Edward militia

John Philip Roblin (August 16, 1799 – November 12, 1874) was a farmer and political figure in Upper Canada and Canada West (now Ontario).

He was born in Sophiasburgh Township in Prince Edward County, Upper Canada in 1799, the son of Prudence Platt and Philip Roblin. His father was a Loyalist who had left New Jersey for Upper Canada in 1784. His uncle, John Roblin, was a member of the 5th Parliament of Upper Canada from 1809 to 1810.

John Philip Roblin lived in Prince Edward County his entire life. As a young man, he first settled in Ameliasburgh Township, clearing land and farming, then moved to Hallowell Township and finally settled at Picton in 1858.

Roblin represented Prince Edward County in the Legislative Assembly of Upper Canada from 1830 to 1836. He was elected twice, in the elections of 1830 and 1836. He was a supporter of the Reform movement of Upper Canada, following the lead of Reformers Marshall Spring Bidwell and Peter Perry, the members of the Legislative Assembly from the neighbouring Lennox and Addington County. All three were defeated in the election in 1836, when the Tories won control of the Assembly. Although he was a supporter of the Reform movement, he did not support the radical approach which resulted in the Upper Canada Rebellion in 1837. Instead, as a captain of the 2nd Battalion of Prince Edward militia, he commanded a troop of cavalry in the winter of 1837–1838.

Following the union of Upper Canada and Lower Canada, he was twice elected to the Legislative Assembly of the Province of Canada, in 1841 and 1844. In Parliament, he supported the union of the two provinces, and generally voted as a moderate reformer, but with an independent tendency.

He resigned his seat in 1846 to become county registrar, crown lands agent and customs collector at Picton. He also rose to the rank of lieutenant-colonel in the local militia and warden for Prince Edward District. Roblin was a staunch Wesleyan Methodist. He was a member of the senate of Victoria College at Cobourg, Ontario, from approximately 1848 to 1863.

His cousin, David Roblin, served two terms as a member of the Parliament of the Province of Canada, from 1854 to 1861. John Philip and David became disillusioned with the Reformers of the 1840s and 1850s. John Philip stated that George Brown, one of the leaders of the Reformers in the 1850s, was too moderate, and was "working for the Tories."

Grave marker for John Philip Roblin

He died at Picton, Ontario in 1874.

Two premiers of Manitoba, Sir Rodmond Roblin and Duff Roblin, were related to John Philip Roblin through his cousin David.
