= Big Island (Bay of Quinte) =

Island in Ontario, Canada

Coordinates: 44.118°N 77.243°W

Big Island is an island in Prince Edward County, Ontario, Canada. Approximately 9.5 kilometres (5 3/4 mi) in length and with a maximal width of three kilometres (two miles), it is located in the Bay of Quinte in Lake Ontario, between Belleville and Demorestville. It is accessed by a fixed causeway of 600 m (660 yd, or ^{3}/_{8} mi) length which connects Big Island to the remainder of Prince Edward County. The island is within the former Township of Sophiasburgh and is the largest of all off-shore islands in Prince Edward County.
