= The White Chapel =

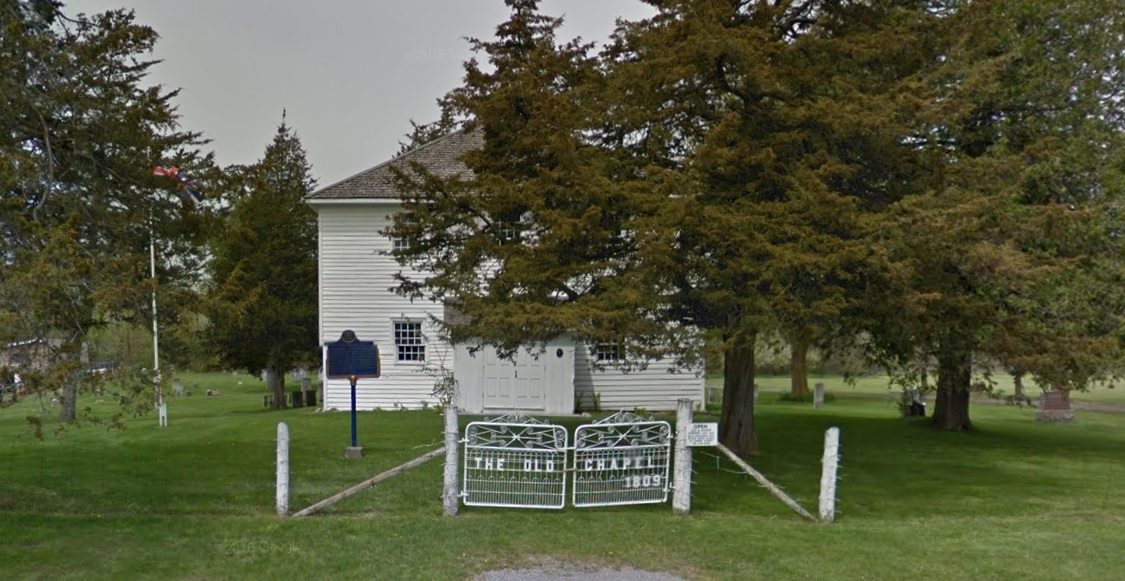
- The White Chapel May 2013

- Location within Ontario Location within Canada
- 44.034555°N 77.139513°W
- Location: 9 White Chapel Rd, Prince Edward, Ontario

History
- Built: 1809

The White Chapel, formerly known as the "Old Chapel", is an historic Methodist church in Prince Edward, Ontario. The chapel was built on land donated by Stephen Conger, a Loyalist from the former Province of New Jersey who settled in Hallowell Township in 1787.

Commenced in 1809, the chapel was the first Methodist church in Prince Edward County and one of the earliest in Upper Canada. Built by William Moore and financed by local subscription, it has been maintained as a place of worship for a longer period than any other church of Methodist origin in Ontario.

The church is situated in the former Township of Sophiasburgh, located in the Municipality of Prince Edward, Ontario.
