= Prince Edward County wine =

Protected class of Canadian alcoholic beverage

Prince Edward County Wine is produced in Prince Edward County (PEC) located in south eastern part of southern Ontario, the most southerly part of Canada. Prince Edward County was designated as the fourth and newest Designated Viticultural Area (DVA) in Ontario in 2007. A DVA is a wine-producing region for which rules and regulations are set down by the Vintners Quality Alliance (VQA) of Ontario. VQA Ontario is an organization officially delegated by the government of Ontario to administer and enforce the Vintners Quality Alliance Act, 1999 There are currently some 42 commercial wineries (as of 2015) and over 50 wine grape growers in Prince Edward County, cultivating more than 700 acres (280 hectares) of vineyard, producing 757 tons of grapes and 6130 hectolitres of wine annually (as of 2007).

== History ==
Since Prince Edward County (locally known as "The County") was first settled in the 1780s by United Empire Loyalists fleeing the American Revolution, it has been known for its agricultural products, initially grains (especially barley) and later tender fruits — at one time it supplied one third of all canned produce in Canada. In the late twentieth century the PEC canning industry disappeared as the greater part of the fruit and vegetables sold in Canada are now imported. However, the twenty-first century is witnessing the establishment of a new high value agricultural industry in the County: wine growing, i.e. viticulture along with wine making.

The first wine grapes were planted in the mid-nineteenth century and achieved some renown when Dorland Nixon was awarded a gold medal for his wine at the 1876 Philadelphia Exposition. The modern era began when Phil Matheson planted an experimental vineyard with vinifera grapes in the 1980s while Ed Neuser and Rita Kaimins established the first commercial vinifera vineyard for their Waupoos Estates Winery in 1993. They were granted the second winery licence in the County (after Grant Howes and the County Cider Company in 1996) and opened their winery in 2001. During the first decade of the twenty-first century, new wineries have emerged at a furious pace, with approximately 30 in operation in 2010.

The éminence grise behind the establishment of the County wine industry is Geoff Heinricks, who was the first to propose that Prince Edward County could one day be a major player in the Canadian wine industry. He thoroughly investigated the soils and microclimates of the County and concluded that the cool climate coupled with the all-pervading limestone base would be an ideal situation for the grapes of Burgundy (i.e. Pinot noir and Chardonnay). He also provided some other strong recommendations including the various relatives and clones of Pinot noir (Pinot gris, Pinot blanc, and Pinot Meunier), St. Laurent, Melon de Bourgogne, Gamay, and Riesling, and has given serious consideration to several others. He described his endeavours in a popular book as well as a monograph that is available on line. Geoff and two partners eventually opened the Keint-he Winery, although he was dismissed and replaced in 2011 after harvest.

== Wineries ==
The majority of County wineries are in the west central region, particularly in Hillier Ward where the Hillier Clay Loam soil formation is predominant. According to Geoff Heinricks, this soil is thin and composed mostly of a mix of limestone and shale gravel; it encourages the vine roots to reach deep into the underlying limestone where they are then assured of good access to both water and drainage. Most of the other wineries are more widely dispersed over the eastern and southeastern regions of the County. They are planted in a variety of complex soils, but all lie atop limestone bedrock at various layers, gifting the limestone subsoil. The situations of many, but not all, of the wineries are summarized on the County viticultural map. Some wineries may be too new to be on the map and others may not belong to the PECWA. All known wineries, arranged by region, are listed below.

=== Hillier ===
- Broken Stone Winery
- By Chadsey's Cairns Winery (closed)
- Casa-Dea Estates Winery
- Closson Chase Vineyards
- Gravel Hill Vineyards
- The Grange of Prince Edward Vineyards and Winery
- Harwood Estate Vineyards
- Hillier Creek Estates
- Hinterland Wine Company
- Hubbs Creek Vineyard
- Karlo Estates
- Keint-he Winery and Vineyards
- Lacey Estates Winery
- Last House Vineyard
- Lift Haus Winery (closed)
- Morandin Wines
- Norman Hardie Winery
- Redtail Vineyard
- Rosehall Run Vineyards
- Sandbanks Estate Winery
- Stanners Vineyard
- Terra Estate Winery
- The Old Third Vineyard
- Trail Estate Winery
- Traynor Family Vineyard
- Volta Estate Winery

=== Hallowell ===
- Barnyard Wine Company (aka 3630 Wines) (Closed)
- Black Prince Winery
- Domaine Darius
- Huff Estates Winery
- Stoss Lee Wines
- Sugarbush Vineyards and Winery
- TerraCello Winery

=== East ===
- Amanda's Vineyards
- Bergeron Estate Winery & Cider Co.
- Cape Vineyards
- County Cider Company
- Del-Gatto Estates
- The Devil's Wishbone Winery (closed)
- Half Moon Bay Winery (temporarily closed)
- Thirty Three Vines Winery (aka 33 Vines Winery)
- Three Dog Wine
- Waupoos Estates Winery

=== South ===
- Exultet Estates
- Half Moon Bay Winery (temporarily closed)
- Lighthall Vineyards
- Long Dog Winery (temporarily closed)
- On the 8th County Winery (moribund at least in 2014)

== Vineyards ==
There are also a number of vineyards that grow wine grapes, but do not have their own winery. This table lists many of the most prominent such vineyards, but it is not comprehensive and may include some that are no longer active.

Name	Year	Soil	Varietals Grown	Customer(s)
Black River Vineyards	?	?	?	?
Bloomfield Estates Winery	?	Hillier Clay Loam	?	?
Cold Creek Vineyards	?	Hillier Clay Loam	Pinot noir	?
Hilltop Cellars Inc.	?	?	?	?
Fieldstone Estate Vineyards	2001	Hillier Clay Loam	Pinot noir, Chardonnay, Pinot gris, Cabernet Franc, Riesling, Syrah	?
On the Reach	?	?	?	?
Robert Thomas Estate Vineyards and Winery Inc.	?	Ameliasburgh Clay Loam	?	?
Terra Fertilis (Trivia Vineyard)	2009	Hillier Clay Loam	?	?
Two Bridges Vineyards	?	Ameliasburgh Clay Loam	?	?
Vignoble Plamondon	?	Ameliasburgh Clay Loam	?	By Chadsey's Cairns Winery, Bergeron Estate Winery, Lift Haus Winery
Wicked Point Vineyard	?	Farmington Loam	?	?
