= Tara Hall =

Manor house in Canada

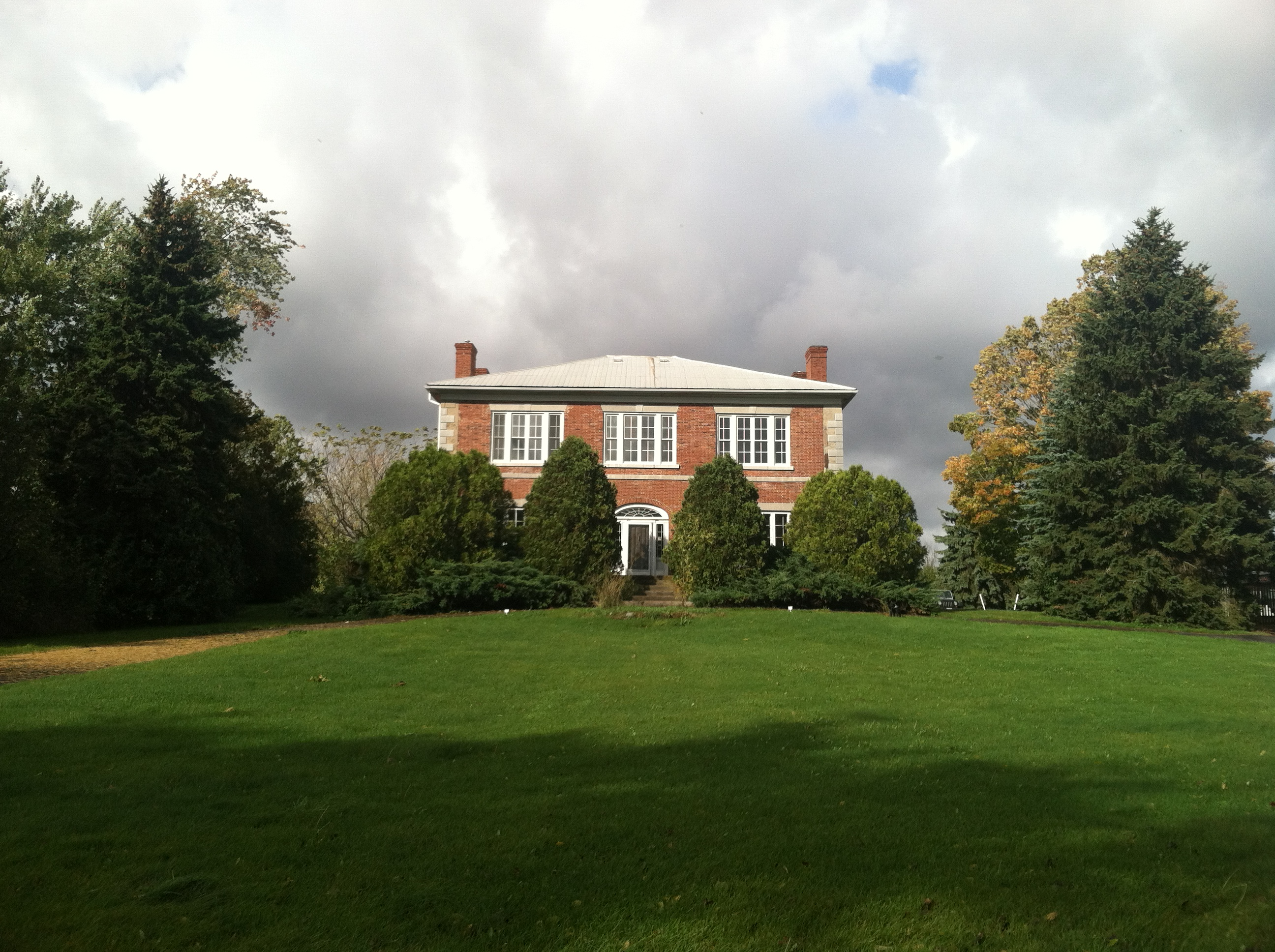
- Interactive map of the Tara Hall area

General information
- Architectural style: Georgian - United Empire Loyalist
- Location: Wellington, Canada
- Coordinates: 43°57′10″N 77°20′16″W
- Groundbreaking: 1837
- Completed: November, 1839

Technical details
- Structural system: Brick and Timber

Design and construction
- Designations: Prince Edward County Heritage Building

Tara Hall is a Georgian manor house in the village of Wellington, in Prince Edward County in Ontario, Canada. It was built by merchant and postmaster Archibald McFaul between 1837 and November, 1839. McFaul named the house "Tara Hall" after the ancient Irish legend of Tara's Banquet Hall at the Hill of Tara. The Hall is a well-preserved example of Regency-era Georgian architecture in the United Empire Loyalist style. unique to the region. It is listed on the register of historic buildings of Prince Edward County and is protected under the Ontario Heritage Act of the Province of Ontario and has been described as “an outstanding achievement in its day”.

== Construction ==
Tara Hall is constructed from brick laid five deep in the decorative Flemish bond fashion. The bricks used in Tara Hall were manufactured in Rochester, New York and made the Lake Ontario crossing as ballast in McFaul's schooners on the return journey after delivering agricultural produce to the United States.

The corners of the building are set with large tooled limestone quoins. The front of the building features wide Venetian windows with splayed stone lintels above a stone band course separating the storeys. At some time prior to the 1870s a long pagoda-roofed veranda was added running the length of the building. Only photographs and trace impressions of the veranda's supports remain.

== Interior ==
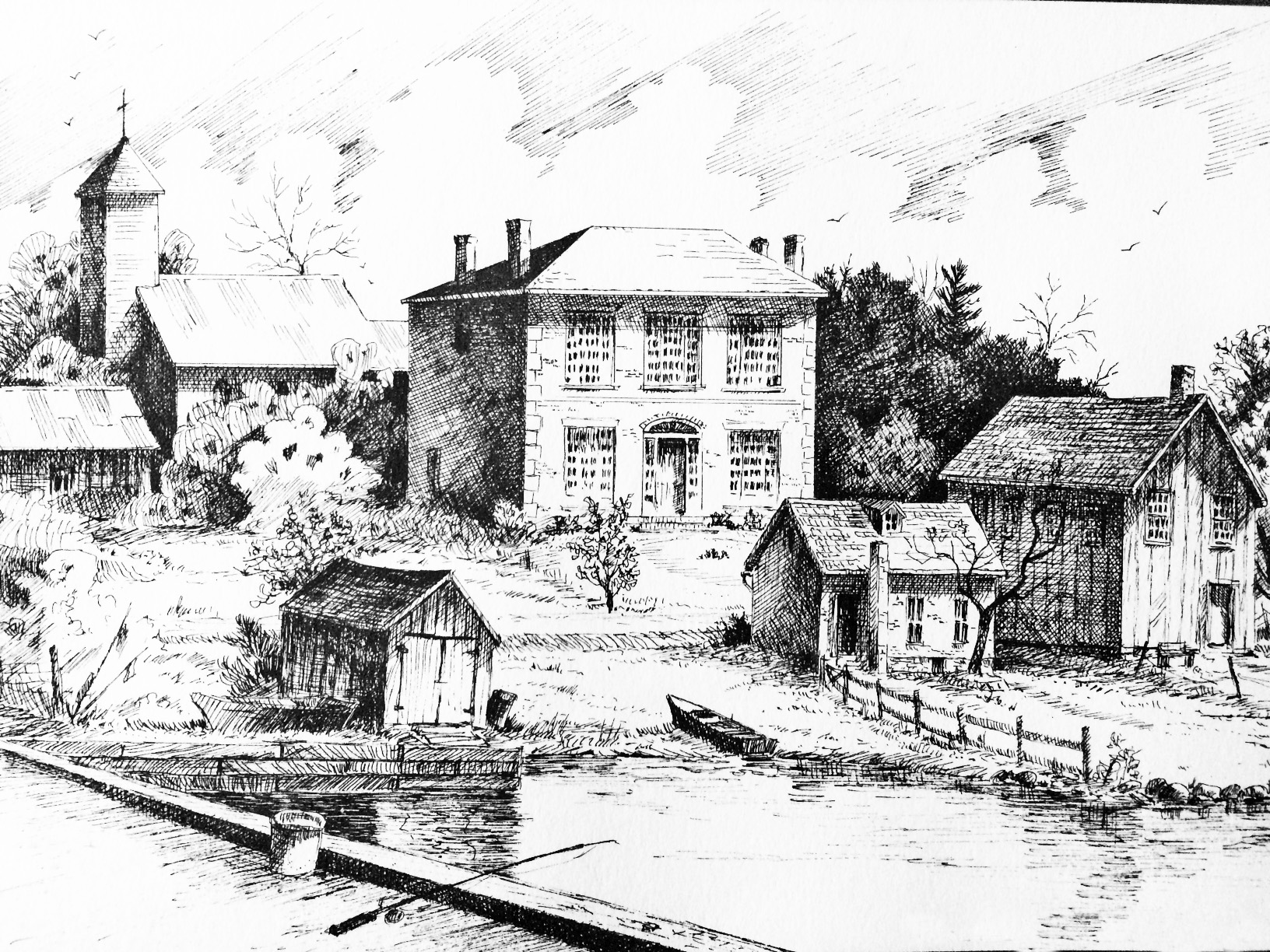
Tara Hall and Old Wellington in the 1840s

A rare groin vault ceiling arches over the main entrance hall and intact 19th-century plaster ceilings with mouldings unique to each room are found throughout. The manor contains a total of seven fireplaces venting through five chimneys.

On the ground level, the east side of the structure contains a double length salon which converts with three 10 foot tall folding doors into a parlour and a morning room. There is evidence that the morning room opened onto a greenhouse or orangery, possibly a late Victorian addition, since removed. On the west side is a large dining hall and to the rear of that, a study. The dining hall and parlour both open onto the long front veranda through two sets of French doors with sidelights.

On the upper floor, reached by a graceful curved staircase is a transverse hallway running east–west to the ground floor's north–south. Across from the upper landing is the neo-classical pilastered doorcase entrance to Tara Hall's ballroom. Off the hallway are the master suite and four additional bedrooms as well as a servants' passage leading back to maids quarters and a separate staircase down to the kitchens in the rear. A one-storey tail housed the winter kitchen and beyond this the summer kitchen and a smaller coach house though these buildings were lost to fire.

Below the winter kitchen is the root and wine cellar. In a separate building set further back on McFaul's 38 acre lot, a large coach house and stable once stood which was shared with St. Frances of Rome Catholic Church. Above the winter kitchen were quarters for two servants. Two additional houses were constructed adjacent to the property on Town Line Road (now County Road 2) to house McFaul's additional employees and their families. Directly across from Tara Hall stands McFaul's original blacksmith shop which predates the hall.

== Secret tunnel and underground railway ==
There is purported to have been a secret tunnel running from Tara Hall to St. Frances of Rome Catholic Church, 160 metres due north, which may have been used to shuttle fugitive slaves fleeing the United States. With many ports and frequent maritime traffic from the United States, the Underground Railroad was active in Prince Edward County and the church's involvement in Tara Hall and its location directly opposite Wellington's large shipping pier made it well suited for the purpose. However, due to the secrecy surrounding the underground railway, it is difficult to find documented proof. An alternate version of the tunnel story attributes the secret passage to the Fenian Raids of 1866.

== Tara Hall in the 19th century ==
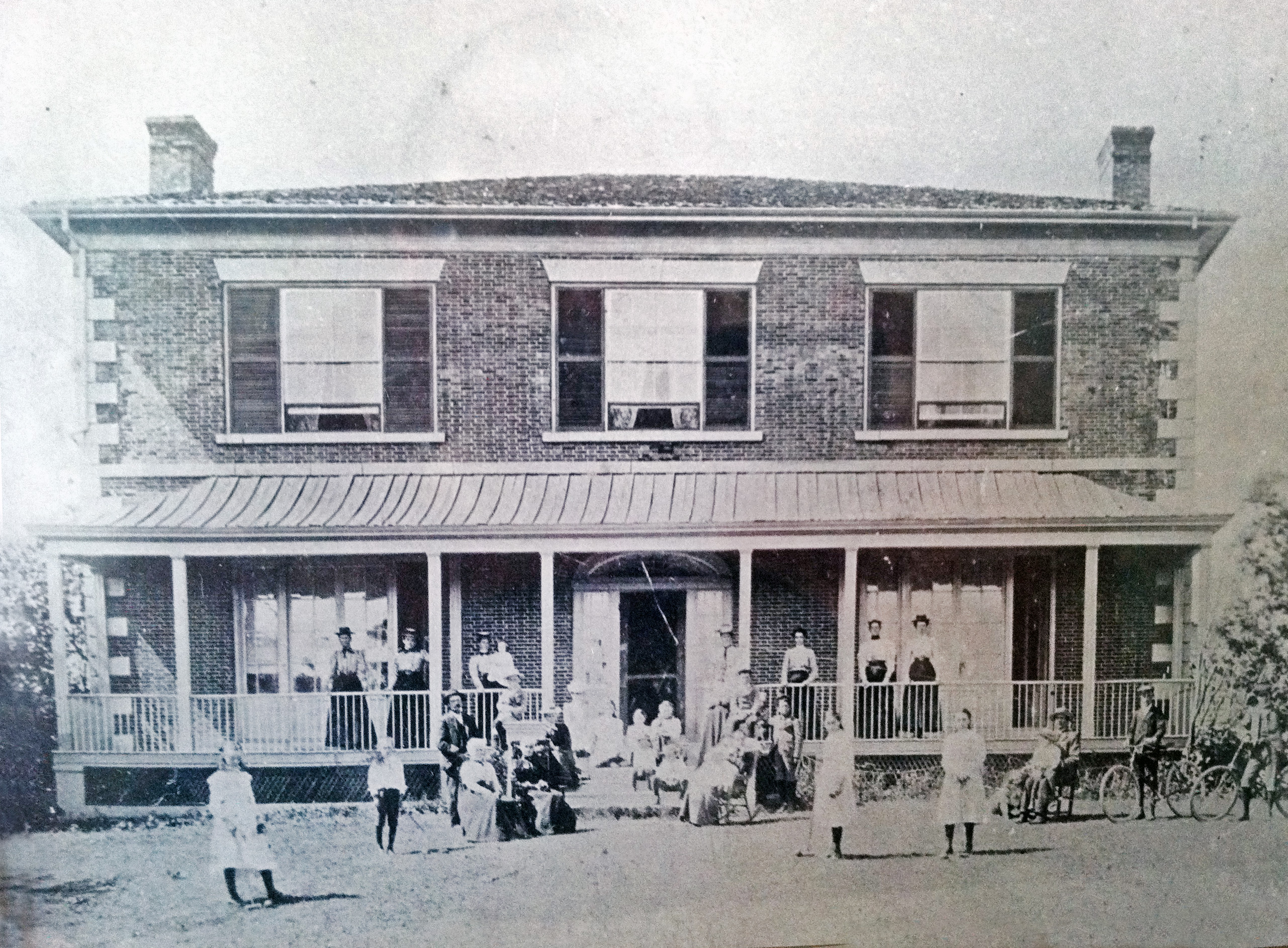
Tara Hall circa 1870.

As the most prominent building in Wellington, Tara Hall was famous for lavish parties which could last for several days.

In 1844, Tara Hall was sold by McFaul to the Catholic Church for £1,000. The church used it as a Catholic boarding school for the next twelve years when the church failed to pay the mortgage and McFaul foreclosed and reoccupied the residence in 1856. McFaul lived at Tara Hall until his death in January 1864.

In the late nineteenth century, Tara Hall hosted Masonic functions including the historic commemoration of the cornerstone of the new Wellington Lodge in 1889.

== Modern era ==
Through the 20th and into the 21st centuries, Tara Hall has been well maintained and cared for and is largely intact in every detail as the elegant manor house it was in the 1830s.
