= Milford, Ontario =

Milford is a town in the single-tier municipality of Prince Edward County, Ontario, Canada. It is located at 43°56.5′N 77°5.25′W. Located on the Black River, Milford was founded in 1808 and was a busy timber milling centre until approximately 1900 and was the capital of Marysburgh Township before township restructuring and ultimately amalgamation into Prince Edward County.

Mill Pond is an artificial lake created to harness water power during the milling period. Mill pond is approximately 1.2 kilometers long and suitable for non-motorized watersports.

Today Milford's economy is largely based on tourism. Milford boasts a large theater, one restaurant, 2 shops, 5 bed and breakfasts, a post office and a library. Milford hosts an annual fair in September and an annual winter carnival in January.
