= James Wilson (Upper Canada politician) =

Upper Canada politician

James Wilson (1770 – September 1, 1847) was an English-born farmer and political figure in Upper Canada. He represented Prince Edward in the Legislative Assembly of Upper Canada from 1808 to 1810, from 1820 to 1830 and from 1834 to 1836 as a Reformer.

He received a land grant in Sophiasburgh. Wilson was a Methodist. His election in 1808 was declared invalid in 1810, but he was reelected in 1820, 1825, 1828 and 1834.
