= Roblin =

Roblin may refer to:

== Places ==
- Dauphin—Roblin, provincial electoral division in Manitoba, Canada
- Municipality of Roblin, a rural municipality in Manitoba Canada
- Roblin, Manitoba, Canada
- Roblin (electoral district), Manitoba, Canada
- Roblin-Russell, former provincial electoral division in Manitoba, Canada
- Roblín, village and municipality in Prague-West District, Czech Republic
- Rural Municipality of Roblin, a former rural municipality in Manitoba, Canada

== People ==
- David Roblin (April 19, 1812–1863), lumber merchant and political figure in Canada West
- David Roblin (1966-), British physician, pharma and biotech leader
- Dufferin Roblin (1917–2010), Canadian businessman and politician
- John Philip Roblin (1799–1874), farmer and political figure in Upper Canada and Canada West
- John Roblin (1774–1813), farmer and political figure in Upper Canada
- Rodmond Roblin (1853–1937), businessman and politician in Manitoba, Canada

== Other uses ==
- Roblin Airport, airport in Manitoba
- Roblin Lake Camp, Salvation Army camp located in Ameliasburg, Ontario serving Kingston and the greater Frontenac County area
