= Demorestville, Ontario =

Village in Ontario, Canada

- Village
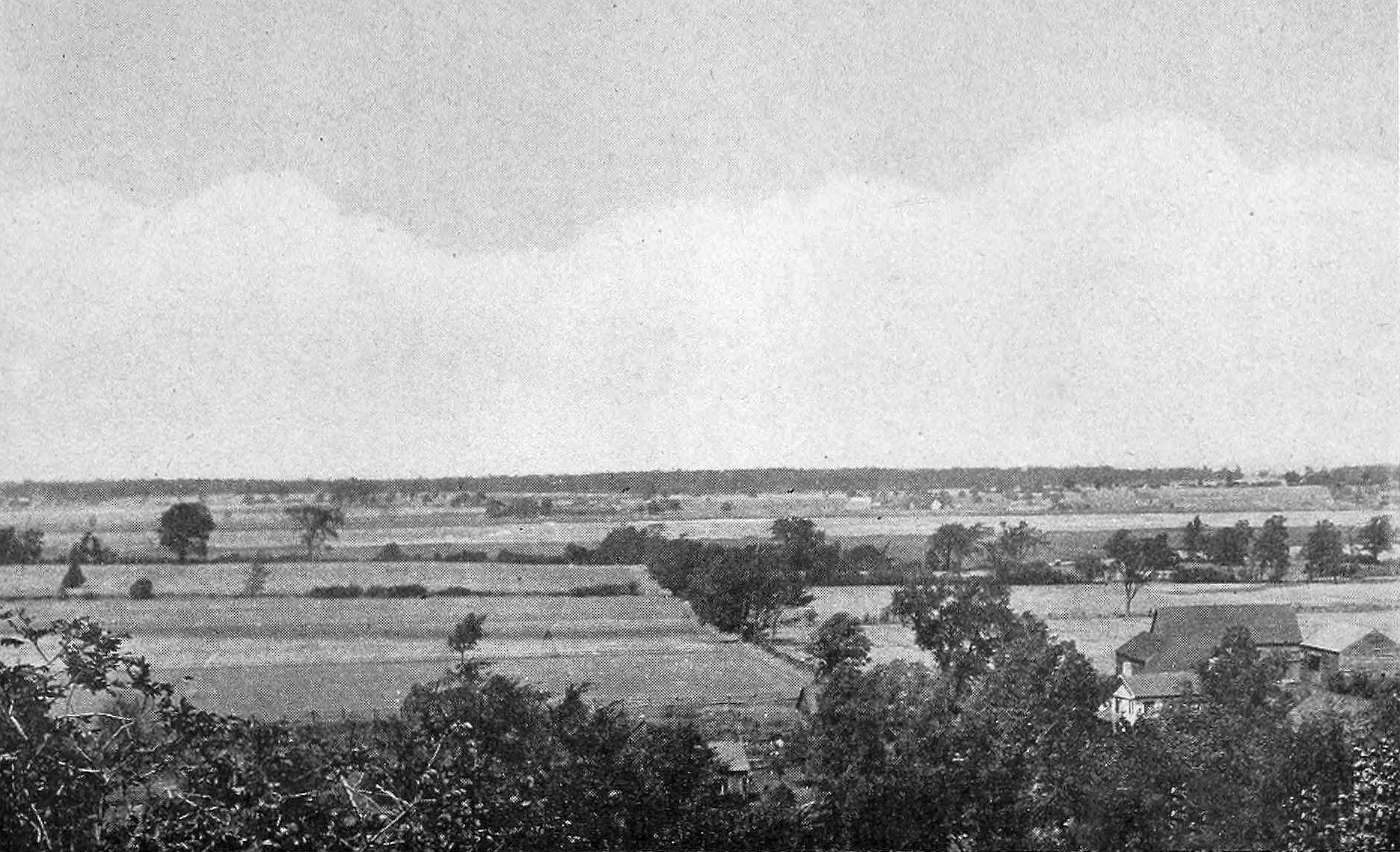
- Demorestville, 1917
- Interactive map of Demorestville, Ontario
- Coordinates: 44°5′30″N 77°12′36″W

Population
  - Total: approximately 100

Demorestville is a small village in Sophiasburgh Township in Prince Edward County, Ontario, Canada. It was named after Guilliame Demorest (12 February 1769 – 10 December 1848). Once much larger, it currently has a population of approximately one hundred. A formerly much larger (but now small) creek (known locally as "The Crick") which once powered mills fed by Fish Lake, flows through the center of town and has now been protected under the Demorestville Conservation Area.

== History ==
In 1783 explorer Guilliame Demorest crossed the Bay of Quinte where he followed a stream flowing from an inland lake. Finding it full of fish, he gave it the name "Fish Lake", the name it has retained since. Heading back downstream he built his home near the site of a small waterfall, which became the first building in Demorestville. This home also served as the town's first church under Wesleyan Methodist minister Thomas Madden, who also preached in the mill founded by Demorest. The town grew quickly, adding a grist mill, a sawmill, an ashery, a plow shop, a tannery, a carding and fulling mill, six general stores, three blacksmiths, furniture factories, clothing and show manufacturers, blacksmiths, and even a carriage shop building buggies. It also boasted the county's first grammar school, a newspaper, The Criticizer, and the first canning factory in Ontario to process tomatoes (founded by magnate Wellington Boulter). This canning factory is now the location of Sophiasburgh Central School. In the early part of the century Demorestville was considered the most prominent city west of Kingston and was at the time larger than both York (now Toronto) and Meyer's Creek (now Belleville). In 1898 a phone line was built between the Grant Sprague's farm on neighbouring Big Island three kilometres away which drew people "wanting to see this modern marvel".

However, in addition to three churches, the town had a less "Christian" side as well. In the 19th century, Demorestville became known as "Sodom" or as the twin towns of "Sodom and Gommorah", a name still retained by Gommorah Road which circles the north west border of the village. This name was earned due to its reputation as a sin city of ill-repute with many taverns, brothels, and hotels servicing both the smugglers and the thriving lumber industry. Much like the Biblical story, "Sodom" was all but destroyed in a massive fire near the turn of the twentieth century, and with the mills gone and local businesses decimated, few chose to remain and the town was never rebuilt. Since then it has overgrown with forest and only a tiny population remains in this tiny village that was once one of Canada's largest metropolises.
