= Prince Edward County =

Prince Edward County may refer to:

- Prince Edward County, Virginia, United States
- Prince Edward County, Ontario, Canada
