= Robling =

Robling is a surname. Notable people with the surname include:

- Claire Robling (born 1956), American politician
- Dorothy Denning (née Robling, born 1945), American information security researcher
- Idwal Robling (1927–2011), Welsh sports commentator
- Lewis Robling (born 1991), Welsh rugby union player

== See also ==
- Roblin (disambiguation)
