= Prince Edward Island Older Boys' Parliament =

Youth model Parliament

The Prince Edward Island Older Boys' Parliament was a youth model parliament for boys aged 16 to 21 in the province of Prince Edward Island established in 1955. Like most of the provincial youth parliaments in Canada, the PEIOBP was established in conjunction with the provincial Boys’ Work Board, a primarily Christian-based organization consisting of various Protestant churches and related organizations. Prior to the establishment of the PEIOBP, delegates from the province would attend the Maritime Youth Parliament.

The first session of the PEIOBP met in Province House in Charlottetown, the legislative building for PEI, from April 15 to 17, 1955. Between 40 and 50 members formed the first parliament. David MacDonald of Charlottetown served as Premier; Malcolm MacRae of Cherry Valley was the Deputy Premier; and Dave Stewart was the Speaker. Legislation debated at that first session included matters regarding the Christian faith, temperance, and sports.

During its 10th session, the PEIOBP held its proceedings at Summerside for the first time. Former PEI Premier and then-current Chief Justice of the Supreme Court of PEI served as the Lieutenant Governor of the Boys' Parliament.

NOTE - the Rotary Clubs of PEI have hosted (as at March 2024) 34 Annual Youth Parliaments in Prince Edward Island
