= Prince Edward County Board of Education =

School district in Ontario, Canada

Prince Edward County Board of Education (PECBE) was a school district in Ontario, Canada, serving Prince Edward County. Its headquarters were in Bloomfield.

The school district, as of 1997, operated eight elementary schools and one secondary school, with over 3,600 students and 275 teaching and support employees. The district served ten municipalities, including the townships of Ameliasburgh, Athol, Hallowell, Hillier, Ontario, North Marysburgh, Sophiasburg, and South Marysburgh, the villages of Bloomfield and Wellington, and Picton town.

Its territory is now served by the Hastings & Prince Edward District School Board.

== Schools ==
Secondary schools:

- Prince Edward Collegiate Institute

Elementary schools:

- Athol-South Marysburgh School
- Kente Public School
- Massassaga-Rednersville Public School
- North Marysburgh Centennial Central School
- Pinecrest Memorial Elementary School
- Queen Elizabeth School
- Sophiasburgh Central School
- C.M.L. Snider Elementary School
