= Carrying Place, Ontario =

Community and historic site in Canada

Coordinates: 44.049°N 77.580°W

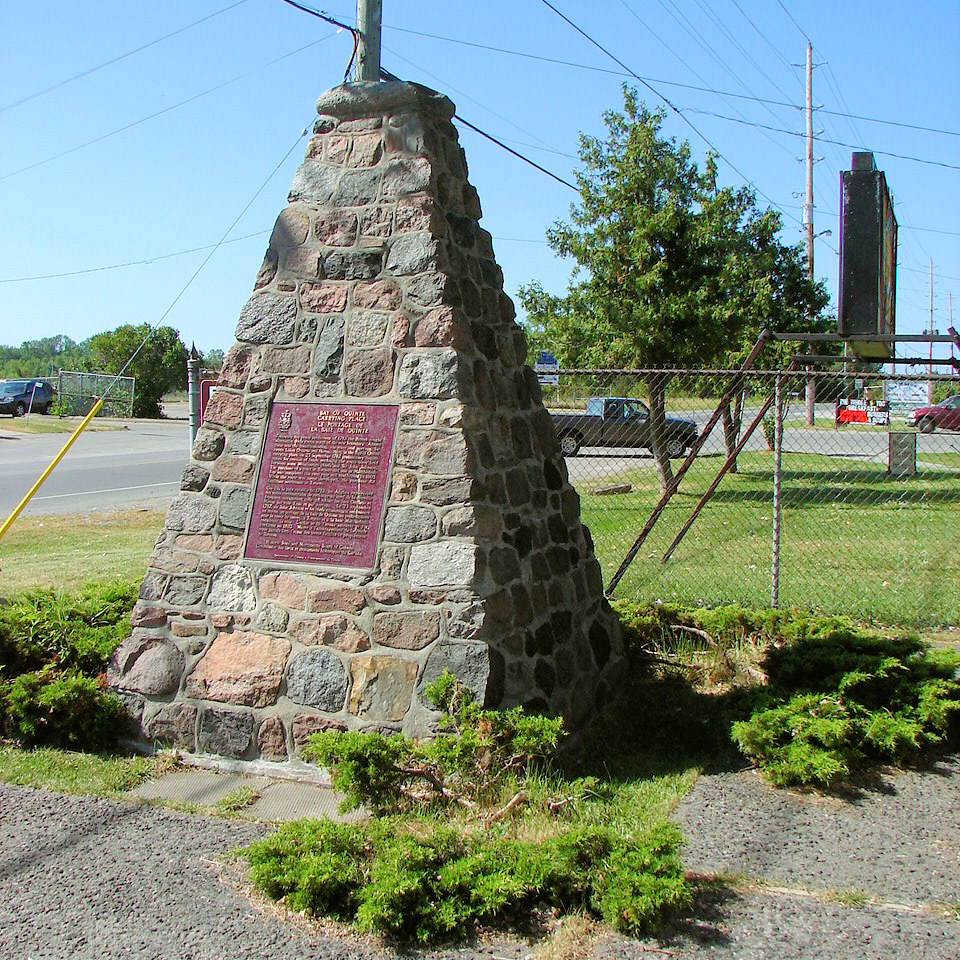
Cairn marking the National Historic Site of Carrying Place

Carrying Place is a community straddling the Quinte West and Prince Edward County border that serves as a gateway to Prince Edward County, Ontario, Canada. Situated northwest of Picton and just south of Trenton, it was named for its location on the portage between the Bay of Quinte and Weller's Bay on Lake Ontario. The Loyalist Parkway passes through the community.

Carrying Place is home to the Department of National Defence's LPH-89 antenna farm attached to CFB Trenton and located along Loyalist Parkway south of Twelve O'clock Point.

== History ==
Before the arrival of Europeans, the local Indigenous people portaged their canoes the two mile stretch of land across the isthmus connecting the Bay of Quinte to access Lake Ontario, which gave the place its name, the Carrying Place. Given its long history as a transport path, now called Portage Road, it is considered the oldest continuously used road in Ontario.

In 1787, the Chiefs of the Mississaugas and Sir John Johnson, Superintendent of Indian Affairs, negotiated a treaty at the Carrying Place. The Mississauga agreed to cede land and a river on the isthmus which would facilitate local settlement by colonists and travel across the isthmus separating the Bay of Quinte from Lake Ontario.

Before the Murray Canal opened a passage for ships in 1889, travelers from Kingston to York (now Toronto) knew the spot well. Once a major stagecoach stop on the old Danforth Road (now Loyalist Parkway), Carrying Place is still a milestone for travelers as they cross the canal that made Prince Edward County into an island.

The name Quinte comes from the indigenous Kente, which survives as Fort Kente and the cities of Quinte and Quinte West.

== Notable people ==
- Lilian Leveridge (1879–1953), teacher, writer
