= J. D. Carpenter =

Canadian poet and novelist

- Born: 1948 (age 77–78); Toronto, Ontario, Canada
- Occupations: Poet, Novelist
- Writing career
- Genres: Poetry, Fiction

J. D. "David" Carpenter is a poet and novelist who lives in Prince Edward County, Ontario.

Carpenter was born in 1948 and grew up in Toronto, Ontario, Canada. He attended York University, where he received a Bachelor of Arts degree in 1971, and Queen's University, where he received a Bachelor of Education degree in 1972. He first worked as a journalist for Daily Racing Form and as a freelance writer. He then taught high school English for 25 years.

Carpenter began his writing career as a poet, publishing four books of poetry between 1976 and 1994: Nightfall, Ferryland Head (Missing Link Press, 1976); Swimming at Twelve Mile (Penumbra Press, 1979); Lakeview (Black Moss Press, 1990); and Compassionate Travel (Black Moss Press, 1994). He then turned to crime fiction during the 1990s and has published six novels: The Devil in Me (McClelland & Stewart, 2001); Bright's Kill (Dundurn Press, 2005); 74 Miles Away (Dundurn Press, 2007); Twelve Trees (Dundurn Press, 2008); The County Murders (Cressy Lakeside Books, 2016), and The Lake Pirates (Cressy Lakeside Books, 2020). His first novel appeared on the Globe and Mail's bestseller list and was nominated for an Arthur Ellis Award; his subsequent novels have also received critical acclaim. His most recent books of poetry are All Us Cats on Stage (Cressy Lakeside Books, 2021) and A Road through the Corn: Prince Edward County Poems, 1982–2022 (Cressy Lakeside Books, 2022). As of 2013, he was currently working on a book of list poems. He is also locally known for writing and performing jazz poetry with musical accompaniment.
