= Waupoos Island, Ontario =

Island in Prince Edward County, Ontario, Canada

Coordinates: 43.988°N 76.982°W

Location of Waupoos Island in Ontario

Waupoos Island is a community in Ontario, located within the municipality of Prince Edward County in the northwest quadrant of Prince Edward Bay. A private ferry service across Smith Bay from the hamlet of Waupoos on the mainland is operated by a holiday camp on Waupoos Island. The island is a favored anchorage for experienced sailors familiar with the rocky shoals in the area.

The nearest population centre to Waupoos Island is the town of Picton.

== History ==
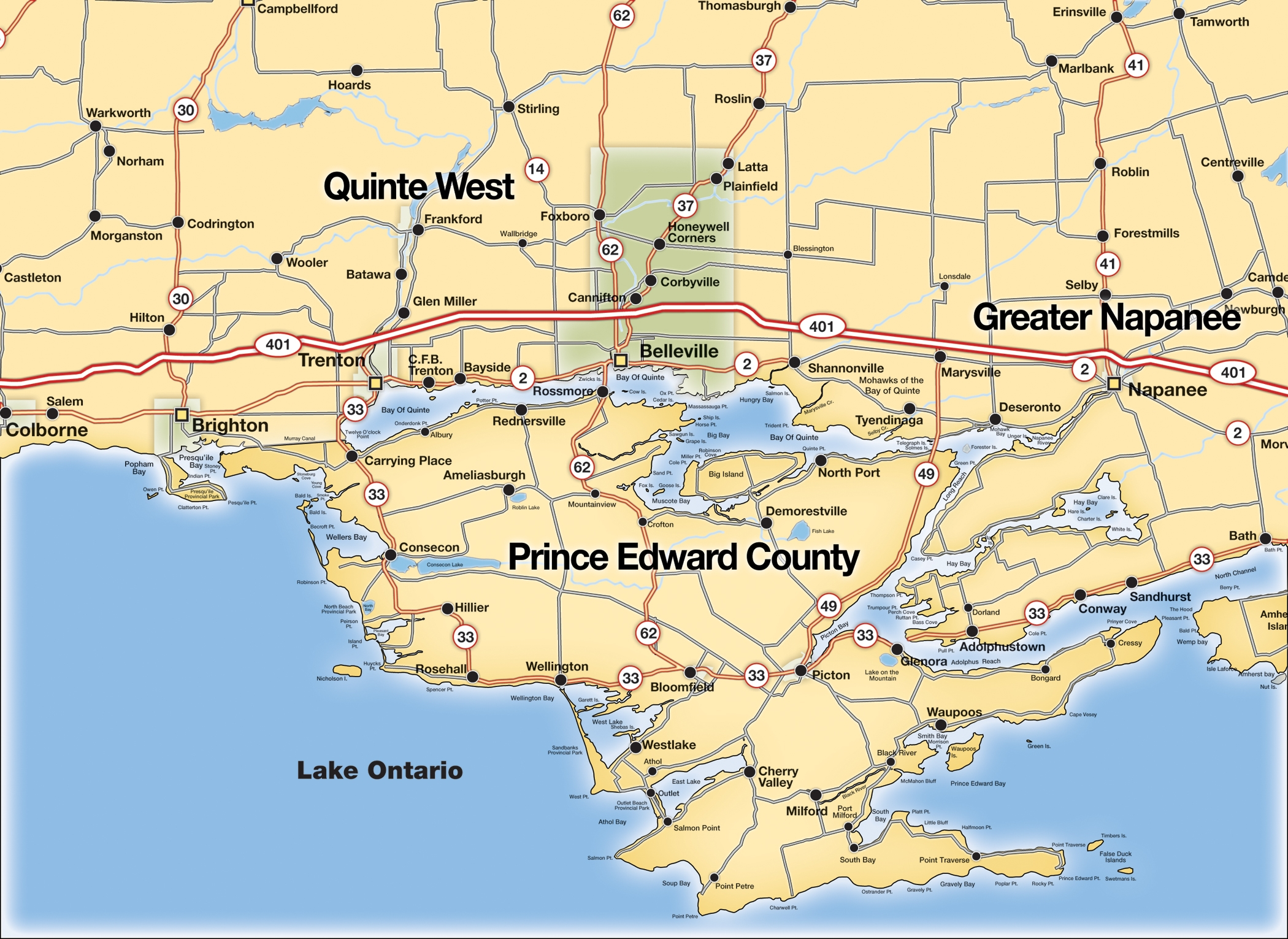
Map of Prince Edward County

Waupoos Island was historically known as Waupoose Island as recently as 1920. Much of the limestone cladding on the former residence of Joseph William's youngest son Kew, the only original structure remaining at Kew Gardens in Toronto was obtained from the lake bottom at "Waupoose Island".
