= Cherry Valley, Prince Edward County, Ontario =

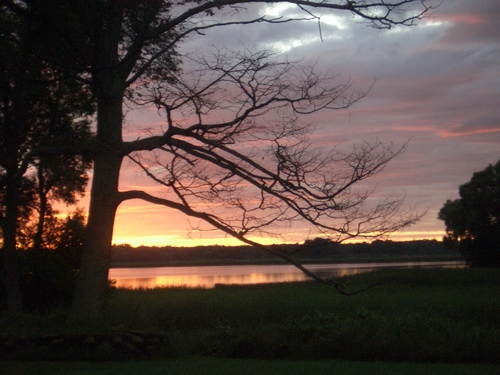
A sunset in Cherry Valley

Cherry Valley is a community in the single-tier municipality of Prince Edward County, Ontario, Canada. It is located at 43°56.16′N 77°9.23′W. Located on Lake Ontario within Quinte on the shores of Lake Ontario, the Salmon Point Lighthouse was erected in Cherry Valley in 1871, when the area was already nicknamed Wicked point by sailors. The lighthouse remained working for about sixty years. Its function was replaced by the Point Petre Lighthouse built in 1833.

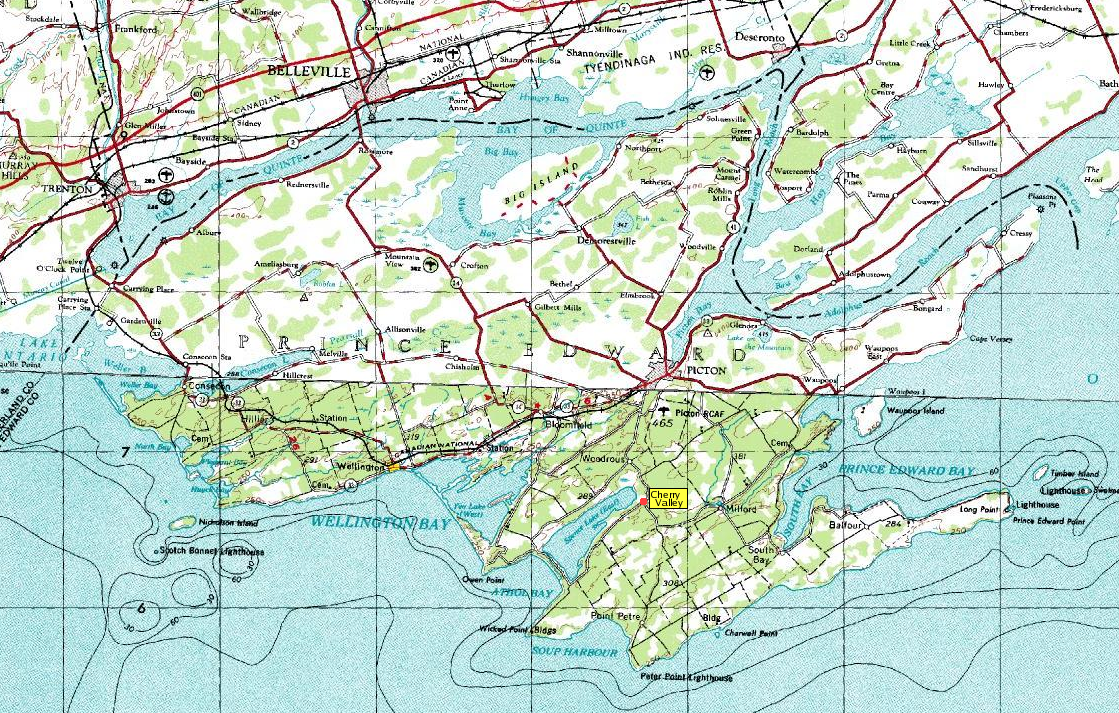
The location of Cherry Valley in Prince Edward County

The economy of Cherry Valley is driven by tourism, in addition to agriculture. There are many beef and dairy farms surrounding the hamlet, and several wineries were opened in the first years of the 21st century. Ship building was a significant industry in the 19th century as well as service and support industries for local farms.

Rumours circulate in Cherry Valley about treasure buried in the local Outlet Sand Bar by French soldiers fleeing from English soldiers during the Seven Years' War.
