= Murray Canal =

Canal in Ontario, Canada

Coordinates: 44°02′49″N 77°37′39″W

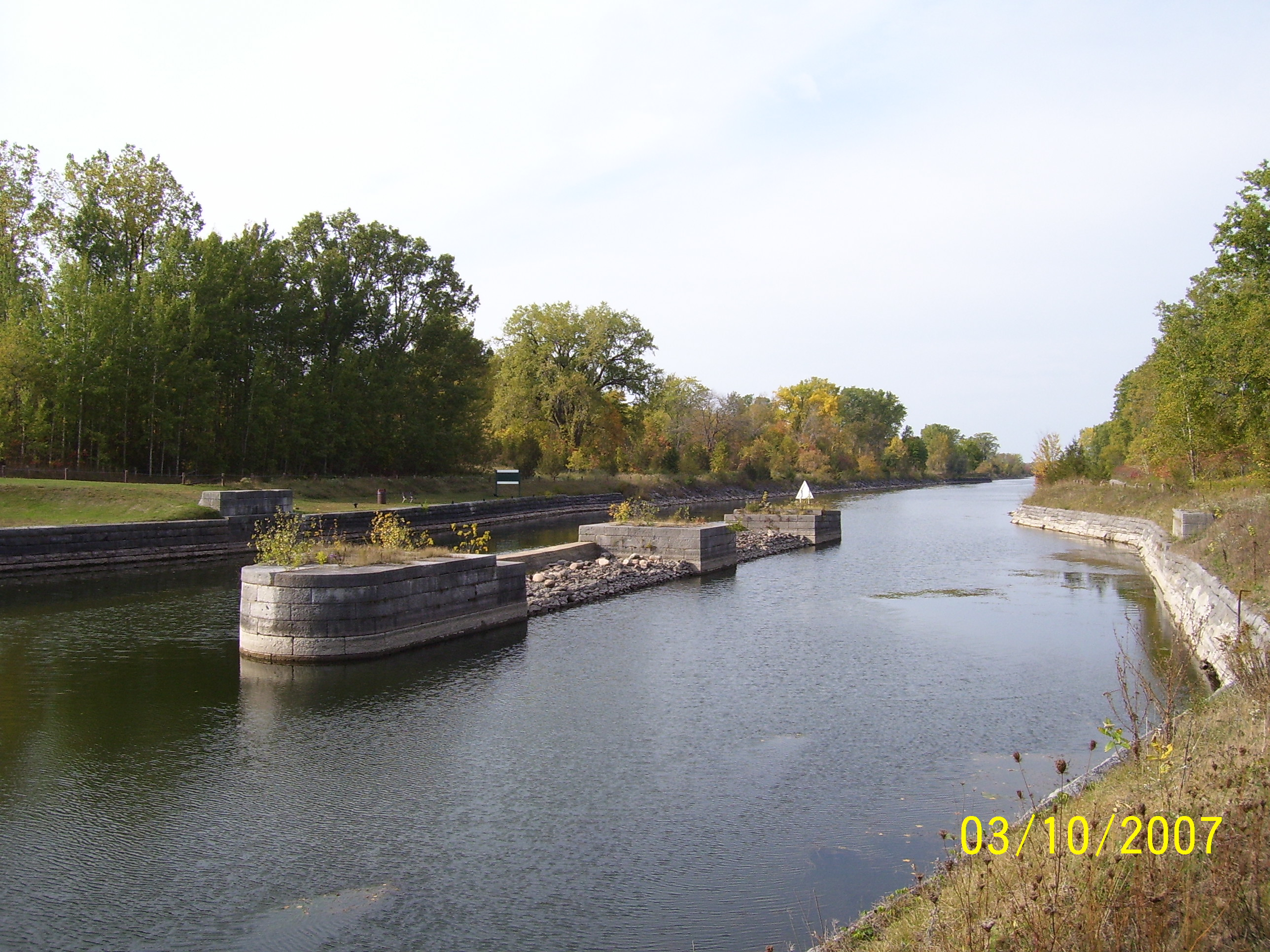
- Interactive map of Murray Canal

History
- Construction began: 1882
- Date completed: 1889

Geography
- Start point: Bay of Quinte
- End point: Presqu'ile Bay

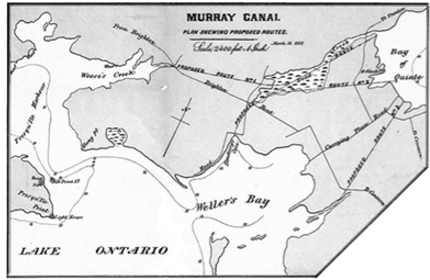
In 1868 three routes were under consideration.

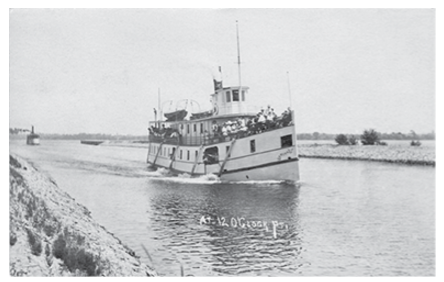
The Varuna transits the Canal, in 1910.

The Murray Canal is a canal in the municipalities of Quinte West and Brighton, Ontario, Canada, and runs from the western end of the Bay of Quinte to Presqu'ile Bay on Lake Ontario. It is approximately 8 kilometres (5 mi) in length and has a maximum depth of 9 feet (2.7 m). The canal shortens the trip for boats wishing to access Lake Ontario from the central and western Bay of Quinte by avoiding having to go around the whole peninsula of Prince Edward County.

Prior to the canal, ships transporting goods to Quinte had to unload at the Carrying Place docks and then move them across land via a wooden railway.

The canal was proposed as early as 1796 and land was set aside by the government of Upper Canada. However, the Welland Canal and the Rideau Canal were seen as more important and construction was delayed. Construction was begun in 1882 and because of problems with unstable banks it took until 1889 to complete the canal.

The canal is crossed by two swing bridges (Ontario Highway 33 and County Rd 64). An unused railway bridge is kept permanently open but the former CN Rail tracks have since been removed with the creation of the Millennium Trail. A swing bridge at Hutchison Road has been removed with only the bridge footings remaining.

The canal saw many years of use with coal and other commercial boats, but after the St. Lawrence Seaway opened in 1959, the traffic declined. Since then there has been a steady rise in recreational use and today the Murray Canal is used by boaters who visit the Trent–Severn Waterway.
