= John Roblin =

Upper Canada politician

John Roblin (May 2, 1774 – February 28, 1813) was a farmer and political figure in Upper Canada.

He was born in Smiths Clove, Orange County, New York in 1774. He was the son of Philip Roblin, a United Empire Loyalist, and Elizabeth Miller. After the American Revolution, his family settled in Adolphustown Township. He was elected to the 5th Parliament of Upper Canada for Lennox and Addington. He was unseated in 1810 because he was felt to be unfit to serve because he was a Methodist lay preacher. This may have been only an excuse, since he was a Reformer and so not acceptable to the Family Compact. His constituency re-electing him, his seat was again declared vacant by the same party and for the same reason. Returning home, he was elected for the third time; but he died before the next session commenced, and thus evaded that which threatened to become a serious cause of dissatisfaction, if not of disturbance.

He died in Adolphustown in 1813. His son David and his nephew, John Philip Roblin later became members of the Legislative Assembly.

== See also ==
- Rodmond Roblin
- Dufferin Roblin
