= Waupoos, Ontario =

Waupoos
- Community
- Location in Ontario
- Country: Canada
- Province: Ontario
- Municipality: Prince Edward County
- Time zone: UTC-5 (Eastern Time Zone)
  - Summer (DST): UTC-4 (EDT)
- Area code: 613

A waterfront view in Waupoos, Ontario.

Waupoos is a rural community in Prince Edward County, Ontario, Canada. Situated along Smith Bay on Lake Ontario, approximately 13 kilometres from Picton, the community is surrounded by orchards, vineyards, farmland and wooded hills.

Waupoos has a history of agriculture, fishing, shipbuilding and food processing. The surrounding area includes a marina, restaurants, wineries, agricultural businesses and historic properties.

== History ==
=== Indigenous history and name ===
The name Waupoos is associated with the Ojibwe word waabooz, meaning "rabbit".

The area was inhabited by the Mississaugas before European settlement. Local historical accounts associate Waupoos Island with seasonal Indigenous settlement.

=== European settlement ===
According to Prince Edward County planning documents, European settlement in Waupoos began in 1783.

During and following the American Revolutionary War, the area became a settlement destination for United Empire Loyalists relocating to British-controlled territory.

Agriculture subsequently became an important part of the community's economy.

=== Shipbuilding and fishing ===
During its early development, Waupoos supported industries including shipbuilding and fishing.

Its location on Lake Ontario provided access to water transportation and the surrounding agricultural region.

=== Food canning industry ===
Food canning became an important industry in Waupoos during the nineteenth and twentieth centuries.

In 1912, local apple grower James Carter established a cooperative canning factory that processed peas, tomatoes and corn grown by surrounding farms.

The Waupoos Canning Company continued operating until the mid-1980s.

Prince Edward County planning documents state that the community's last canning factory later became part of the Waupoos Marina property.

=== Agriculture and tourism ===
Agriculture remained important to Waupoos throughout the twentieth century.

The surrounding region developed apple orchards, vineyards and other agricultural operations.

During the 1990s, Waupoos became associated with the development of Prince Edward County's modern wine industry.

== Geography ==
Sunset in Waupoos during the summer.

A rainbow over the waterfront in Waupoos.

Waupoos is located in eastern Prince Edward County, along Smith Bay on Lake Ontario.

The surrounding landscape includes agricultural fields, apple orchards, vineyards and wooded hills.

Nearby geographical features include Waupoos Island and Prince Edward Bay.

According to a Prince Edward County planning report, the designated settlement area covered approximately 69 hectares, with approximately 52 percent of the land used for agriculture at the time of the report.

=== Waupoos Island ===
Waupoos Island is located offshore from the community of Waupoos in Prince Edward County, Ontario, Canada.

The island is situated in Lake Ontario and has historically been used for agriculture.

Prince Edward County's official planning documents include policies concerning development and shoreline preservation.

== Economy and tourism ==
Waupoos has an economy associated with agriculture, food production, boating and tourism.

Commercial operations in the surrounding area include Waupoos Marina, Waupoos Estates Winery and the County Cider Company.

=== Waupoos Marina ===
Waupoos Marina is a recreational boating facility located along the waterfront near Waupoos Island.

The marina is sheltered by a breakwater and provides facilities for seasonal and visiting boaters.

The marina has been reported to contain 186 boat slips and also provides guest accommodation.

The marina is associated with the community's former industrial waterfront. Prince Edward County planning documents state that the last canning factory in Waupoos became part of the marina property.

=== Restaurants and food businesses ===
==== Waupoos Estates Restaurant ====
Waupoos Estates operates a restaurant on its waterfront property at 3016 County Road 8.

The restaurant is located among the estate's vineyards and overlooks Lake Ontario.

The property also contains orchards, gardens and a historic farmhouse used for accommodation.

==== County Cider Company ====
The County Cider Company is an agricultural business associated with apple production and cider-making in the Waupoos area.

The company was founded by Grant Howes in the 1990s.

The business operates on a historic agricultural property and includes a restaurant overlooking the surrounding countryside and waterfront.

==== Waupoos Tarts ====
Waupoos Tarts was a roadside bakery located at 2596 County Road 8 in Waupoos, Prince Edward County, Ontario. The bakery was operated by Joel Philip Clark and became known for its handmade butter tarts and self-service honour system.

The bakery operated from a small roadside shed containing refrigerators stocked with freshly prepared tarts. Customers could select their purchases and pay using an honour system.

The bakery offered several varieties of butter tarts, including plain, walnut-raisin, raisin, pecan and lemon. Clark prepared the tarts by hand using ingredients including cream.

In November 2024, Cottage Life published a feature about Clark and Waupoos Tarts, documenting the bakery's products, roadside operation and popularity among visitors to Prince Edward County.

Joel Clark sadley passed away in 2026. His obituary, published in The Globe and Mail in September 2026, discussed the bakery's origins in a family recipe and its popularity among visitors from Prince Edward County and beyond.

== Agriculture ==
Sheep grazing in Waupoos.

=== Apple orchards ===
Apple growing has historically been an important agricultural activity in Waupoos.

The region's orchards have supplied fruit for fresh consumption and food-processing industries, including canning and cider production.

=== Waupoos Estates Winery ===
Waupoos Estates Winery is located on a waterfront agricultural property in the Waupoos area.

The estate was developed by Ed Neuser and Rita Kaimins, who began planting grapevines in 1993.

The property covers approximately 100 acres and includes vineyards, orchards, gardens and agricultural land.

Waupoos Estates is associated with the early development of Prince Edward County's modern wine industry.

== Historic buildings and landmarks ==
=== Conrad David House ===
The Conrad David House is a historic property in the Waupoos area.

Local historical accounts associate the property with John A. Macdonald, Canada's first prime minister.

The property later became associated with the County Cider Company.

=== Rose House Museum ===
The Rose House Museum is a historic house museum in the Waupoos area.

The building is associated with early European settlement in Prince Edward County and the history of the Rose family.

The museum preserves aspects of nineteenth-century domestic life and local settlement history.

=== Community facilities ===
Community facilities in and around Waupoos include North Marysburgh Town Hall and Wilkinson Memorial Park.

These facilities are identified in Prince Edward County planning documents as community resources near the settlement.

== See also ==
- Prince Edward County, Ontario
- Picton, Ontario
- Lake Ontario
- United Empire Loyalist
- History of Ontario
