= Archives and Collections Society =

The Archives and Collections Society is a Charitable organization (Canada), incorporated in 1999. In December 2011, the Society changed its name to Naval Marine Archive: The Canadian Collection by supplementary letters patent.

The Society is dedicated to maritime history and conservation, marine research and nautical education, based on the shores of the Great Lakes, in Picton, Ontario.

== Specialty ==
The society specializes in maritime heritage and history - steam and sail, naval, naval aviation, merchant and yachting, mostly Canada/US and Europe, mostly 18th, 19th, and 20th centuries. The collections range from about 90,000 books in the reference library, to paintings and engravings, other artwork and photographs, a very extensive collection of magazines, journals and periodicals, manuscripts, log books, charts, video, film and audio tapes.

The society also took over the Canadian Society of Marine Artists in 2003; this has expanded the art holdings quite considerably.
