= Ameliasburgh Township, Ontario =

Historic township in Ontario, Canada

Coordinates: 44°02′31″N 77°22′48″W

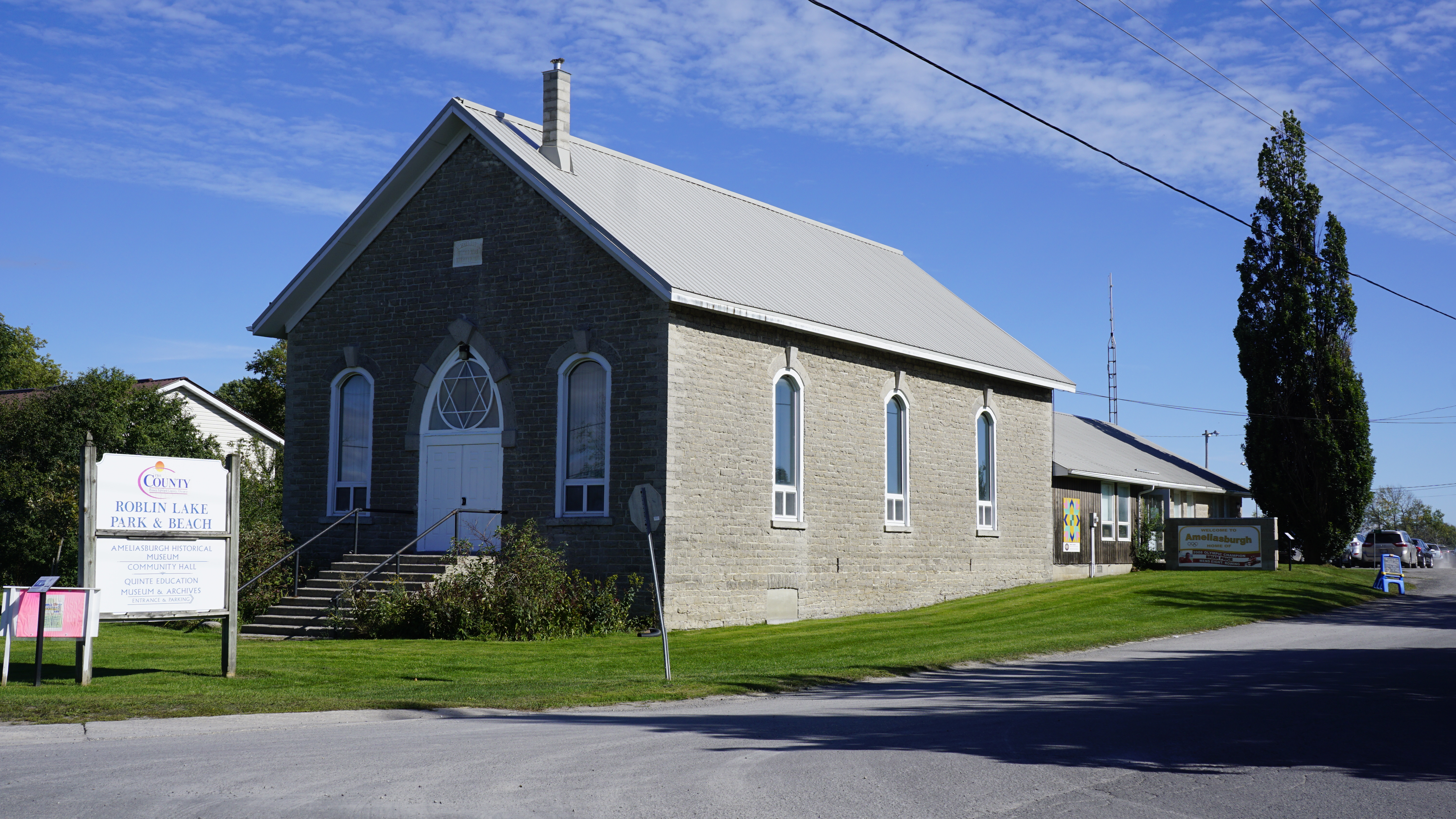
Town Hall

Ameliasburgh is an historic township in southern Ontario, Canada, one of the three original townships that formed Prince Edward County. The other two townships were Marysburgh and Sophiasburgh. Originally known as Seventh Town, it was renamed in 1787 after Princess Amelia, the youngest child of George III. The township was amalgamated into the Corporation of the County of Prince Edward, a single tier municipality, on January 1, 1998.

The community of Ameliasburg, Ontario was named after the township.

== See also ==
- Royal eponyms in Canada
- List of townships in Ontario
