= Ameliasburgh, Ontario =

Coordinates: 44°02′31″N 77°22′47″W

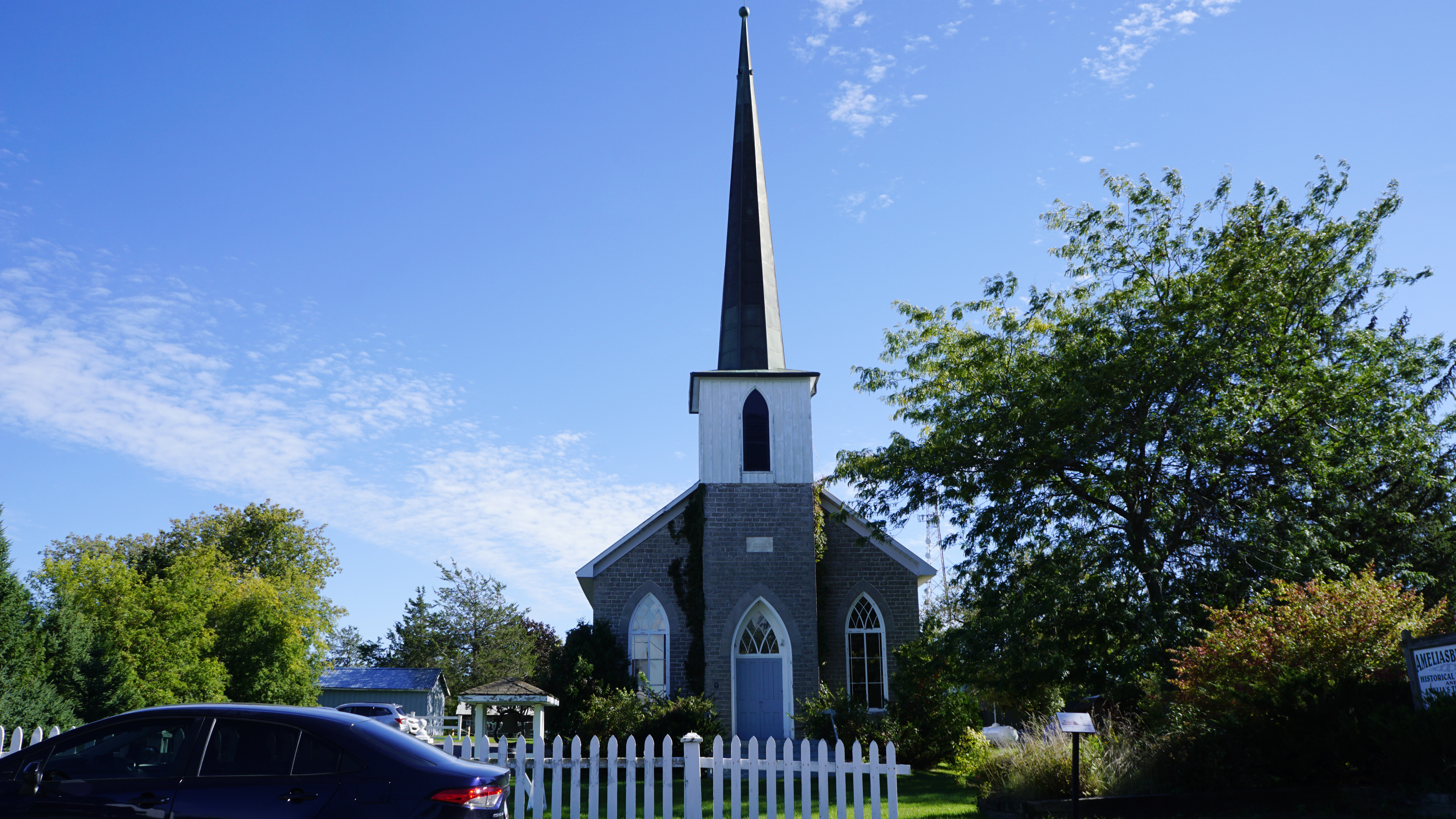
Ameliasburgh Museum

Ameliasburgh is a village in the Township of Ameliasburgh in Prince Edward County, Ontario, Canada.

The village of Ameliasburgh was sometimes known as "Roblin's Mills" after one of its early settlers and the mill he built; the shallow lake to the south of the village is known as Roblin Lake. One of the first townships surveyed in Ontario, Ameliasburgh Township, bordered on the north by the south shore of the Bay of Quinte, was known as "Seventh Town" in the early days of settlement.

Much later, the poet Al Purdy lived in a cottage on Roblin Lake for many years. Several of Purdy's poems, most famously including "Wilderness Gothic", mention features in and around Ameliasburgh. The church the spire of which is being "sheathed in new metal" in "Wilderness Gothic" is now part of the Ameliasburgh Museum. The Ameliasburgh library, which has a collection of Purdy memorabilia on display, is named after Purdy, as is the road leading from the town to the Roblin millpond.

The Roblin Mill has been relocated to Black Creek Pioneer Village in Toronto. Started in 1855, the Ameliasburgh Fall Fair is an agricultural fair held by the community every September, featuring a horse & pony show, baking and garden produce contests, livestock competition and arts & crafts. It was held regularly at the Roblin Fairground in the 1900s but eventually ceased to operate before being re-introduced, at the same location, in 1982.

== See also ==
- Royal eponyms in Canada
