= Bay of Quinte =

Bay in Ontario, Canada

Coordinates: 44°09′N 77°15′W

Location within Southern Ontario

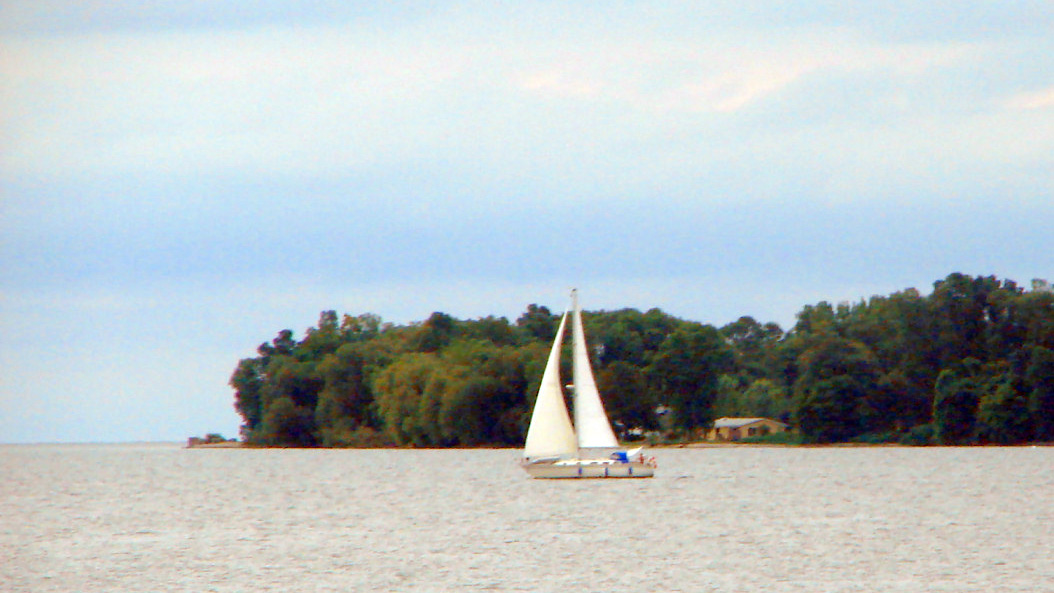
Indian Point of Cressy Point, easternmost point of Prince Edward County and entrance to the Bay of Quinte.

The Bay of Quinte (/ˈkwɪnti/) is a long, narrow bay shaped like the letter "Z" on the northern shore of Lake Ontario in the province of Ontario, Canada. It is just west of the head of the Saint Lawrence River that drains the Great Lakes into the Gulf of Saint Lawrence. It is located about 200 kilometres (120 mi) east of Toronto and 350 kilometres (220 mi) west of Montreal.

The name "Quinte" is derived from "Kenté" or Kentio, an Iroquoian village located near the south shore of the Bay. Later on, an early French Catholic mission was built at Kenté, located on the north shore of what is now Prince Edward County, leading to the Bay being named after the Mission. Officially, in the Mohawk language, the community is called Kenhtè꞉ke, which means "the place of the bay". The Cayuga name is Tayęda꞉ne꞉gęˀ or Detgayę꞉da꞉negęˀ, "land of two logs."

The Bay, as it is known locally, provides some of the best trophy walleye angling in North America as well as most sport fish common to the great lakes. The bay is subject to algal blooms in late summer. Zebra mussels as well as the other invasive species found in the Great Lakes are present.

The Quinte area played a vital role in bootlegging during prohibition in the United States, with large volumes of liquor being produced in the area, and shipped via boat on the bay to Lake Ontario finally arriving in New York State where it was distributed. Prohibition-era illegal sales of liquor accounted for many fortunes made in and around Belleville.

Tourism in the area is significant, especially in the summer months due to the Bay of Quinte and its fishing, local golf courses, provincial parks, and wineries.

== Geography ==
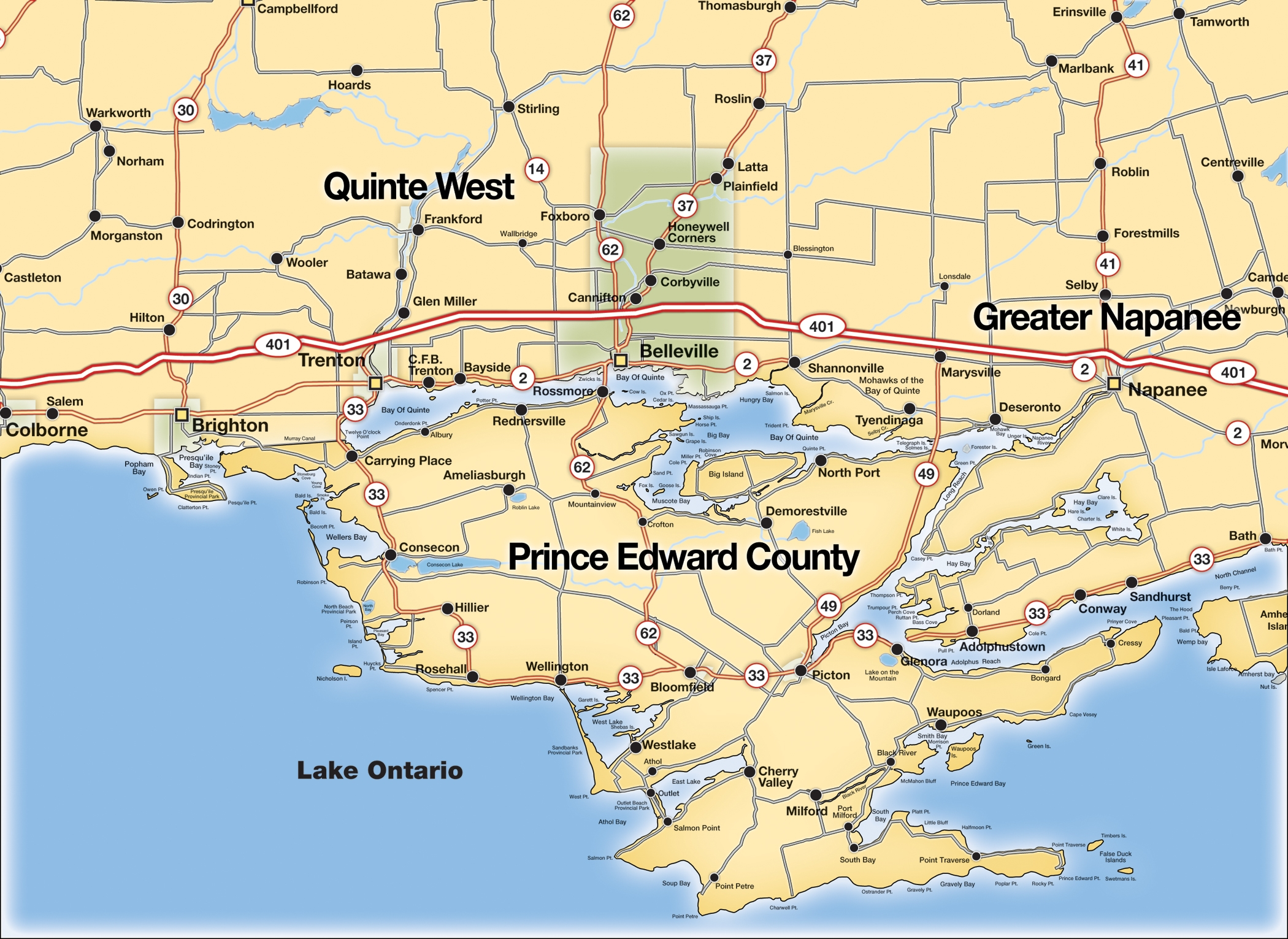
Map of the Bay of Quinte Area (City of Belleville is shaded green)

The northern side of the bay is defined by Ontario's mainland, while the southern side follows the shore of the Prince Edward County headland. Beginning in the east with the outlet to Lake Ontario, the bay runs west-southwest for 25 kilometres (16 mi) to Picton (although this section is also called Adolphus Reach), where it turns north-northwest for another 20 kilometres (12 mi) as far as Deseronto. From there it turns south-southwest again for another 40 kilometres (25 mi), running past Big Island on the south and Belleville on the north. The width of the bay rarely exceeds two kilometres (1.2 mi). The bay ends at Trenton (Quinte West) and the Trent River, both also on the north side. The Murray Canal has been cut through the "Carrying Place", the few kilometres separating the end of the bay and Lake Ontario on the west side. The Trent River is part of the Trent-Severn Waterway, a canal connecting Lake Ontario to Lake Simcoe and then Georgian Bay on Lake Huron.

There are several sub-bays off the Bay of Quinte, including Hay Bay, Big Bay, and Muscote Bay.

Map of the Bay of Quinte, an arm of Lake Ontario, that runs for some 80 km between Prince Edward County and the 'mainland' of Hastings County, in south-east Ontario.

== Bay of Quinte Region ==
Quinte is also a region comprising several communities situated along the Bay of Quinte, including Quinte West, Brighton and the City of Belleville, which is the largest city in the Quinte Region, and represents a midpoint between Montreal, Ottawa, and Toronto.

The Greater Bay of Quinte area includes the municipalities of Brighton, Quinte West, Belleville, Prince Edward County, and Greater Napanee as well as the Native Tyendinaga Mohawk Territory. Overall population of the area exceeds 200,000.

=== Mohawks of the Bay of Quinte ===
The Mohawks of the Bay of Quinte (Kenhtè:ke Kanyen'kehá:ka) live on traditional Tyendinaga Mohawk Territory. Their reserve Band number 244, their current land base, is 73 km^{2} (18,000 acres) on the Bay of Quinte in southeastern Ontario east of Belleville and immediately to the west of Deseronto.

The community takes its name from a variant spelling of Mohawk leader Joseph Brant's traditional Mohawk name, Thayendanegea (standardized spelling Thayentiné:ken), which means 'two pieces of fire wood beside each other'. Officially, in the Mohawk language, the community is called "Kenhtè:ke" (Tyendinaga), which means "on the bay", and was the birthplace of Tekanawí:ta. The Cayuga name is Tyendinaga, Tayęda:ne:gęˀ or Detgayę:da:negęˀ, "land of two logs."

=== Communities ===
- Belleville
- Quinte West
- Brighton
- Shannonville
- Napanee
- Deseronto
- Tyendinaga Mohawk Territory
- Rossmore
- Ameliasburgh
- Picton
- Consecon
- Carrying Place

=== Education ===
The Quinte Region, specifically the City of Belleville, is home to Loyalist College of Applied Arts and Technology. Other post-secondary schools in the region include Maxwell College of Advanced Technology, CDI College, and Quinte Literacy. Secondary schools in the region include Albert College (private school) and Sir James Whitney (a school for the deaf and severely hearing-impaired).

=== Industry and employment ===
The Bay of Quinte region is a hub for industry in eastern Ontario. The region is home to a diverse cluster of domestic and multi-national manufacturing and logistics companies. Sectors include; food processing, auto-parts, plastics and packaging, consumer goods, and more. The region's close proximity to North American markets, strong labour force and start-up and operating costs have attracted attention and new investment from companies all over the globe. Industry in the Bay of Quinte region is supported by a workforce of over 11,000.

Investment attraction and industrial retention are supported regionally by the Quinte Economic Development Commission.

Just a few of over 350 industries located in the Bay of Quinte Region include:

- Schütz Canada, German manufacturer of intermediate bulk containers
- Essroc Canada a division of Italcementi
- Magna Autosystems - lighting division (3 facilities)
- Hannon Climate Control Canada Ltd.—Automotive parts
- Procter and Gamble Inc.— Feminine hygiene products
- Kellogg — Breakfast cereal manufacturer
- Kruger - manufacturing facial and toilet tissue for the away from home market
- Hain Celestial - manufacturing Yves Veggie Cuisine products
- Sprague Foods - canned and jarred soups and beans
- Donini Chocolate - a division of John Vince Foods
- Redpath Sugar
- Trenton Cold Storage Group Inc.—Refrigerated warehousing and distribution. Custom co-packing
- Lactalis Canada—Black Diamond Cheese Division—Cheese manufacturing and packaging
- Avaya—A telecommunications research and product development centre
- Research Casting International—Canadian company specializing in moulding and casting for the production of museum exhibits
- Cooney Transport Ltd.—Trucking company
- Wellington Mushroom Farm / Highline Produce—Mushroom farm
- Domtech—Copper wiring
- ClearWater Design Canoe and Kayak—Boat manufacturer
- The SAB Group of Companies Limited—Consumer goods company
- Mapco Plastics—Biodegradable plastic packaging manufacturer
- Citipack Distribution—Cash and carry
- Babars Bazaar—International commodity trading
- Jobsters Staffing—Staffing agency

== Images ==
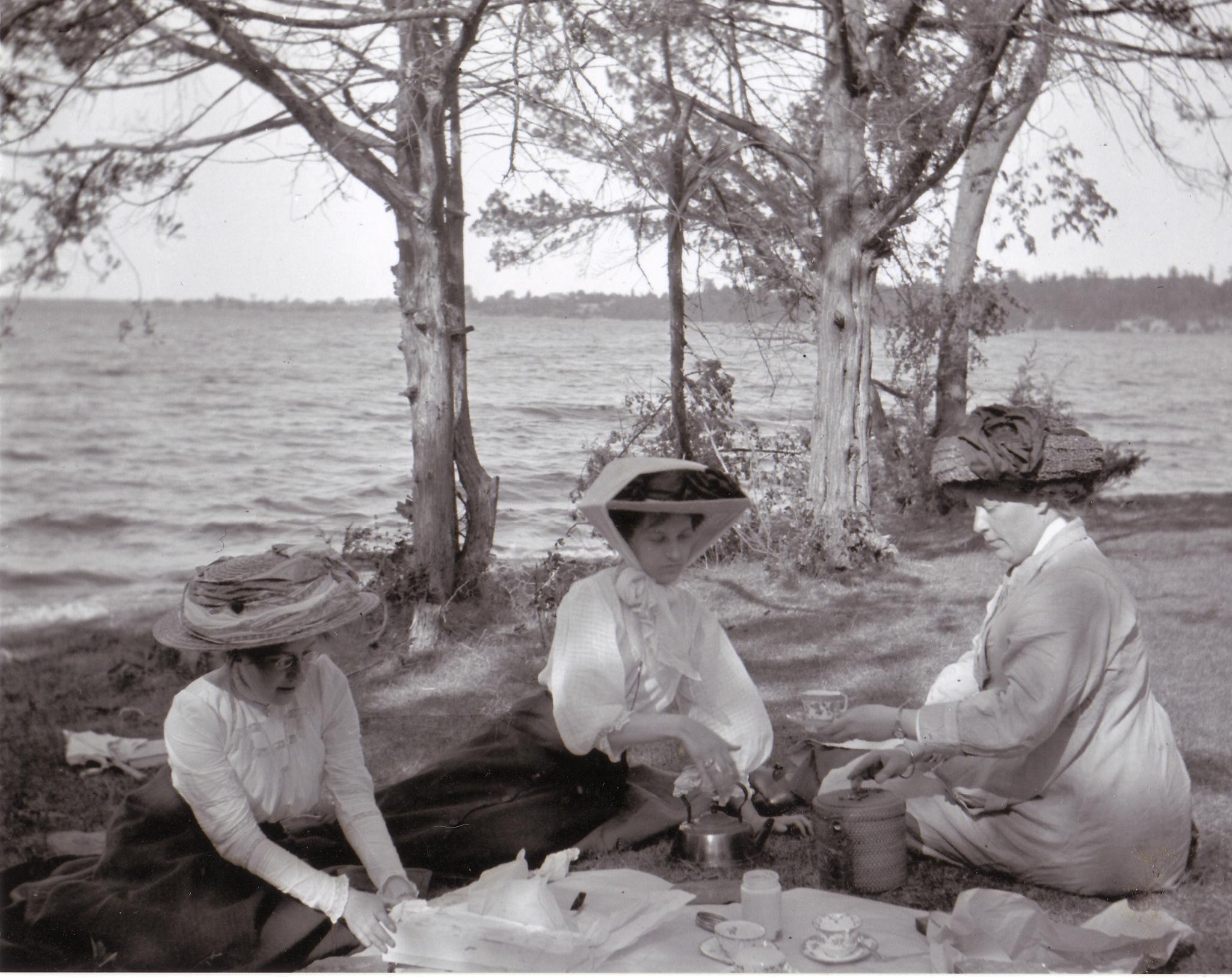
Picnic on the Bay in August 1909

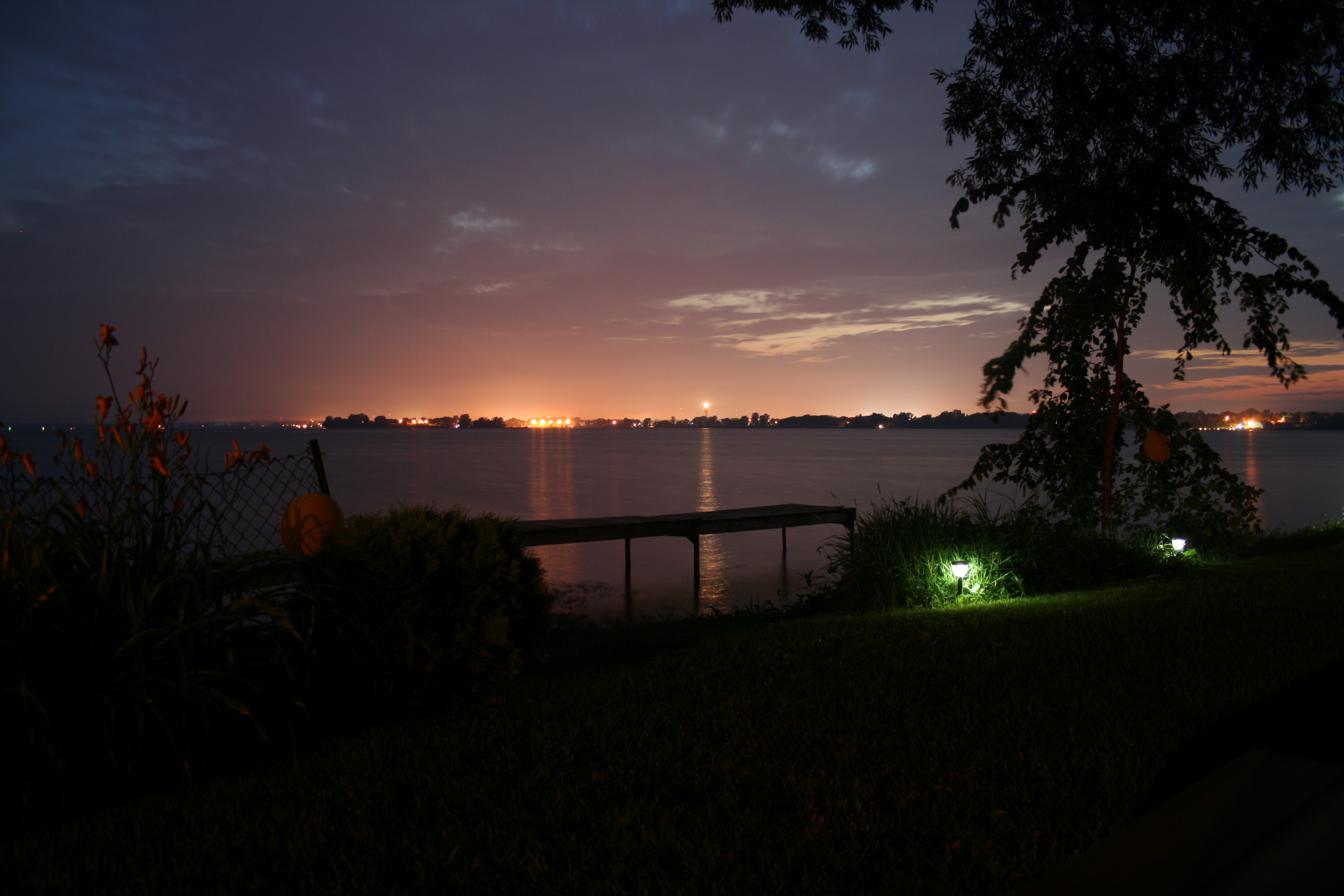
The Bay of Quinte at night, with a view of CFB Trenton.
