= Hillier, Ontario =

Community in Ontario, Canada

Coordinates: 43.9741°N 77.4546°W

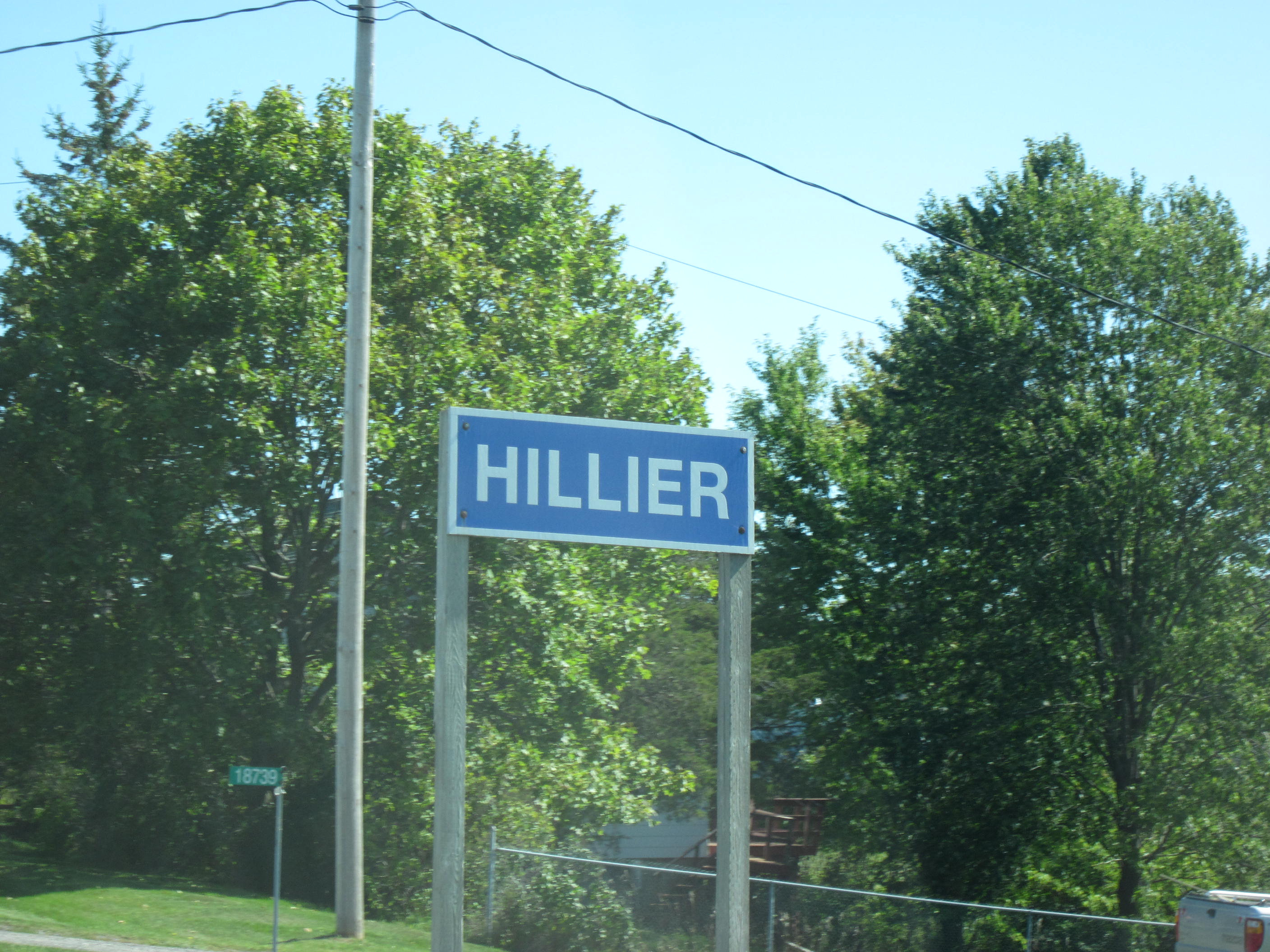
Hillier community road sign

Hillier is a community in the Canadian province of Ontario, located in Prince Edward County. Established in 1823, it was named after Major George Hillier (d. 1840), British Army officer and military secretary to Sir Peregrine Maitland from 1818 to 1828. It is located on the Loyalist Parkway or Highway 33 and is roughly 30 minutes from Belleville, Ontario.

Hillier's population is roughly 100 people. The town hall, which is at the centre of the hamlet, was once a school and has been marked as a national historical site.

Hillier is ward 7 of the 10 wards in Prince Edward County. The ward consists of several communities including Consecon, Melville, Rosehall and Hillier.

Hillier is well known in its area for its many wineries, as well as its Hillier in the Park Day, which takes place in August and regularly draws in hundreds of families from the Prince Edward County area.

Source: Province of Ontario—A History 1615 to 1927 by Jesse Edgar Middletwon & Fred Landon, copyright 1927, Dominion Publishing Company, Toronto

== See also ==
- List of townships in Ontario
