= Marysburgh Township, Ontario =

Historic township in Ontario, Canada

Coordinates: 43.910605°N 77.009894°W

Marysburgh is a former incorporated and now geographic township in southern Ontario, Canada. It is one of the three original townships that formed Prince Edward County. The other two townships were Ameliasburgh and Sophiasburgh. Originally known as Fifth Township, it was renamed in 1786 after Princess Mary, the fourth daughter of George III. In 1871, the township was split into North and South Marysburgh townships. These two townships were amalgamated into the Corporation of the County of Prince Edward, a single tier municipality, on January 1, 1998.

After the American Revolution, a group of Germans who had fought as mercenaries settled in the area, one of the first German-speaking settlements in the province. Around the same time, former English and Irish soldiers also came to this area. One of the prominent regiment of soldiers to settle here was 84th Regiment of Foot (Royal Highland Emigrants). An Ontario Historical Plaque was erected in front of the museum by the province to commemorate the Marysburgh Settlement's role in Ontario's heritage. Many children of Loyalists also received land grants in the township of Marysburgh.

== See also ==
- List of townships in Ontario
