= Prince Edward County, Ontario =

Municipality in Canada

Prince Edward
- Single-tier municipality
- County of Prince Edward
- Coordinates: 44°00′N 77°15′W
- Country: Canada
- Province: Ontario
- Settled: 1792
- Incorporated: 1998

Government
  - Type: Municipality
  - Mayor: Ernie Margetson
  - Federal riding: Bay of Quinte
  - Prov. riding: Bay of Quinte

Area
  - Land: 1,052.61 km^{2} (406.41 sq mi)

Population (2021)
  - Total: 25,704
  - Density: 24.4/km^{2} (63/sq mi)
- Time zone: UTC-5 (EST)
  - Summer (DST): UTC-4 (EDT)
- Postal Code: K0K
- Area code: 613 / 343
- Website: www.thecounty.ca

Prince Edward County (PEC) is a single-tier municipality in southern Ontario, Canada on the Bay of Quinte. Located on Lake Ontario’s northeastern shore, the area is known for Sandbanks Provincial Park and as a cottage country and wine country destination due to its waterfront forested landscapes and many small wineries. Technically a peninsula, the completion of the Murray Canal in 1889, near Carrying Place, made PEC functionally a man-made island.

Approximately 1,000 square kilometres, Picton is the largest population center, followed by Wellington, Bloomfield, Ameliasburgh, Milford, and Consecon. In 2021, Prince Edward County had a census population of 25,704.

== History ==
Settled by indigenous peoples, the county has significant archeological sites. These include the LeVescounte Mounds of the Point Peninsula complex people, built about 2000 years ago.

The county was created by Upper Canada's founding lieutenant-governor John Graves Simcoe on July 16, 1792. It was named after Prince Edward Augustus, Duke of Kent (the fourth son of King George III and father of Queen Victoria) who was commander-in-chief of British North America.

The United Empire Loyalist flag, which is similar to the flag of Great Britain, but in a 1:2 ratio. The flag is still used in loyalist settlements like Prince Edward County.

Shortly after the American Revolution, the Crown made land grants to some of the earliest United Empire Loyalists to encourage their settlements in Ontario and provide compensation for property lost in the Thirteen Colonies. The county was originally composed of three townships named in honour of three of George III's daughters.

For many years Prince Edward County has been closely associated with the wholly mainland Hastings County. Its longtime militia unit has been The Hastings and Prince Edward Regiment (locally known as the Hasty Ps), whose most famous member was Farley Mowat. This noted author wrote two books about his experiences with the Hasty Ps during the Second World War's Italian Campaign: The Regiment and a subsequent account, And No Birds Sang.

On January 1, 1998, the Town of Picton, the villages of Bloomfield and Wellington, and the townships of Ameliasburgh, Athol, Hallowell, Hillier, North Marysburgh, Sophiasburgh, and South Marysburgh amalgamated to form a new municipality with the official legal name of Prince Edward County. Each of the former municipalities is now a ward.

=== Former municipalities ===
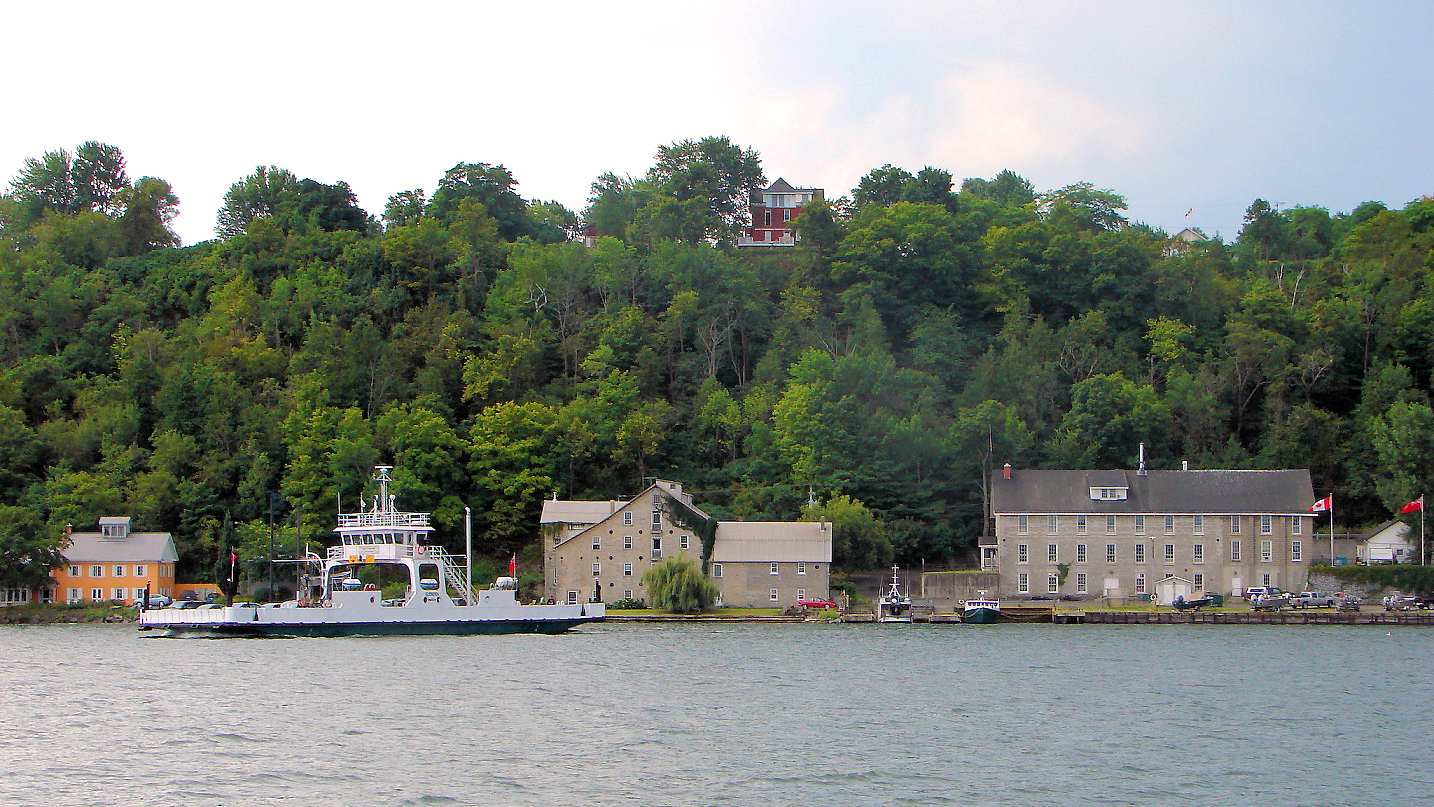
Glenora

The following are former municipalities:

- Ameliasburgh, named after Princess Amelia, youngest daughter of George III
- Athol
- Bloomfield
- Hallowell, named after Captain Benjamin Hallowell (1723–1799)), eminent Loyalist, formerly of Boston. He was the father-in-law of Chief Justice John Elmsley.
- Hillier, organized in 1823, and named after Major George Hillier, military secretary to Sir Peregrine Maitland.
- North Marysburgh, surveyed in 1785 and settled by Loyalist veterans, some of Hessian birth. Named for Princess Mary, Duchess of Gloucester and Edinburgh, one of George III's daughters.
- Sophiasburgh, named for Princess Sophia, one of George III's daughters. Surveyed in 1785 and 1787, settled by Loyalists from Nova Scotia and the Mainland.
- South Marysburgh, also named for Princess Mary, Duchess of Gloucester and Edinburgh, one of George III's daughters.
- Picton, named for Sir Thomas Picton
- Wellington, named after Arthur Wellesley, 1st Duke of Wellington

== Geography ==
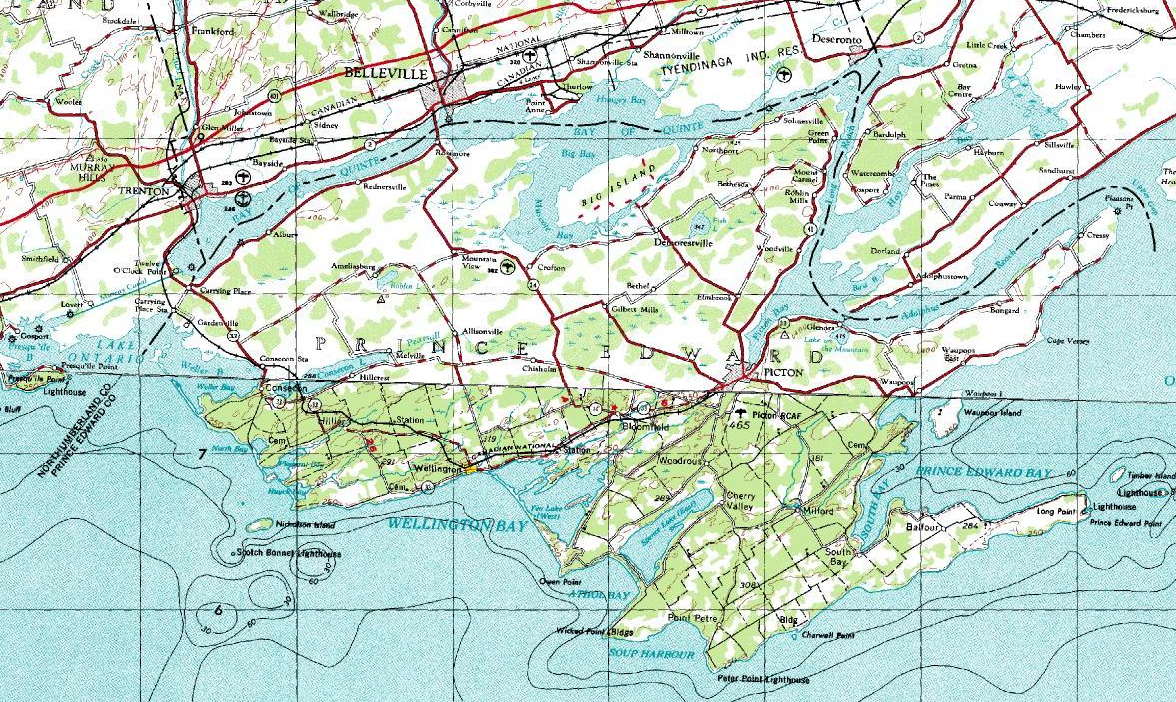
Map of Prince Edward County

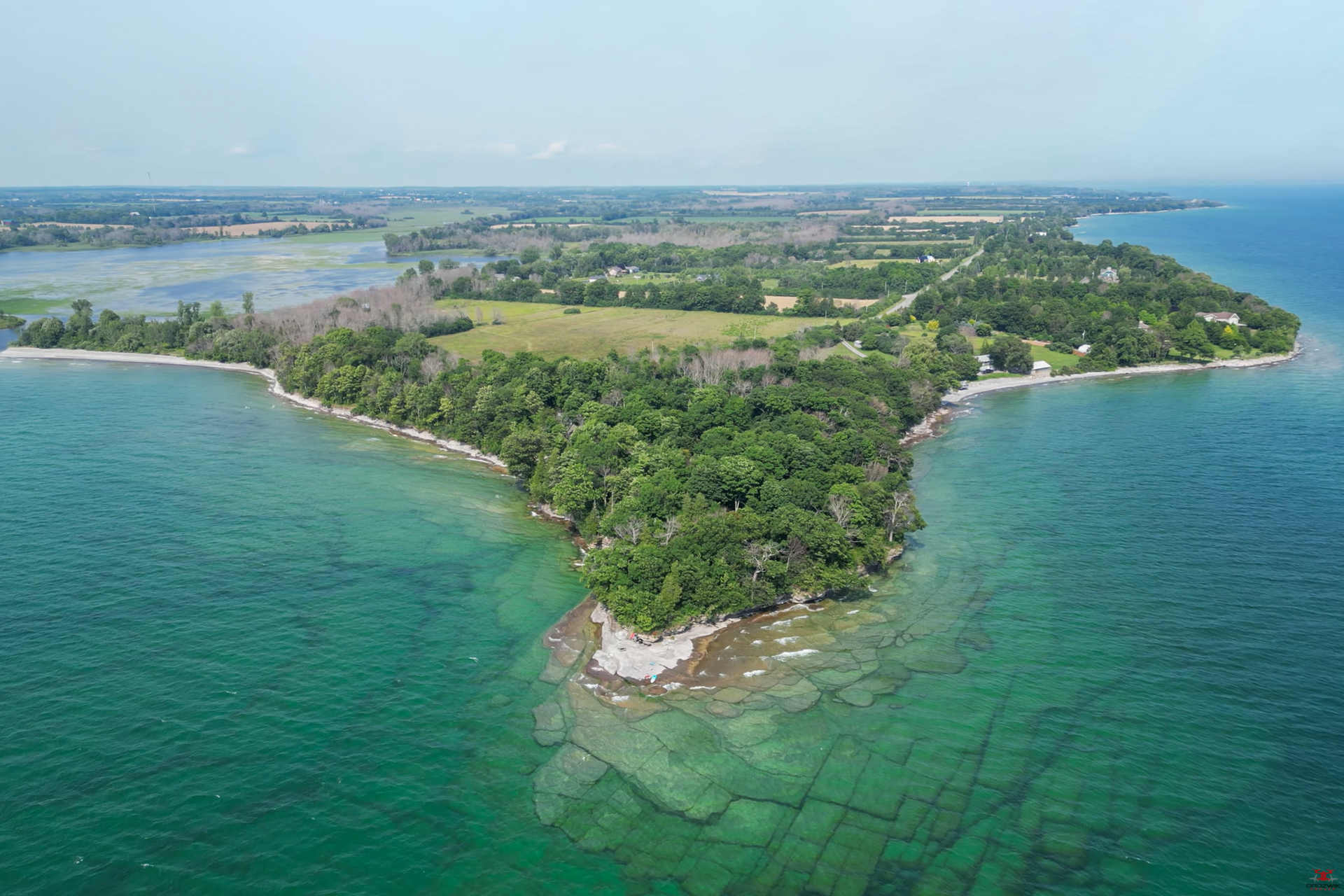
Huycks Point in Prince Edward County

Prince Edward County is located in Southern Ontario on a large irregular headland or littoral at the eastern end of Lake Ontario, just west of the head of the St. Lawrence River. This headland (officially named Prince Edward County in 1792) is surrounded on the north and east by the Bay of Quinte, with the Murray Canal connecting the bay to Lake Ontario across the county. Murray Canal is crossed by two, two-lane swing bridges, the western one on County Road 64, and at the eastern end, the County Road 33 bridge. Bay of Quinte is crossed by two, two-lane bridges of about 850m length – one carrying Provincial Highway 62 near Belleville and the other about 24 km east carrying Provincial Highway 49 near Deseronto.

=== Climate ===
The county's relatively mild humid continental climate (Dfb) due to the influence of Lake Ontario has led to the establishment of about 50 vineyards and close to 30 wineries; as a result, Prince Edward County is one of Ontario's designated viticultural areas. The lake effect from Lake Ontario results in heavier snowfall than in neighbouring counties. July is the hottest month and January is the coldest month.

Climate data for Picton (1981−2010)
Month	Jan	Feb	Mar	Apr	May	Jun	Jul	Aug	Sep	Oct	Nov	Dec	Year
Record high °C (°F)	15.6 (60.1)	12.0 (53.6)	23.3 (73.9)	29.5 (85.1)	29.0 (84.2)	34.5 (94.1)	37.8 (100.0)	34.4 (93.9)	31.1 (88.0)	26.0 (78.8)	21.7 (71.1)	16.1 (61.0)	37.8 (100.0)
Mean daily maximum °C (°F)	−2 (28)	−1 (30)	3.9 (39.0)	11.1 (52.0)	17.8 (64.0)	22.4 (72.3)	25.6 (78.1)	24.3 (75.7)	20.0 (68.0)	13.5 (56.3)	7.4 (45.3)	1.4 (34.5)	12.0 (53.6)
Daily mean °C (°F)	−6.4 (20.5)	−5.6 (21.9)	−0.6 (30.9)	6.8 (44.2)	13.0 (55.4)	17.6 (63.7)	21.0 (69.8)	20.2 (68.4)	16.0 (60.8)	9.6 (49.3)	4.1 (39.4)	−2.4 (27.7)	7.8 (46.0)
Mean daily minimum °C (°F)	−10.9 (12.4)	−10.2 (13.6)	−5.1 (22.8)	2.5 (36.5)	8.2 (46.8)	12.7 (54.9)	16.4 (61.5)	16.0 (60.8)	11.9 (53.4)	5.6 (42.1)	0.8 (33.4)	−6.2 (20.8)	3.5 (38.3)
Record low °C (°F)	−36 (−33)	−35.6 (−32.1)	−27 (−17)	−15.6 (3.9)	−4.4 (24.1)	0.6 (33.1)	5.0 (41.0)	3.3 (37.9)	−0.6 (30.9)	−7.2 (19.0)	−18.9 (−2.0)	−33 (−27)	−36 (−33)
Average precipitation mm (inches)	80.4 (3.17)	77.1 (3.04)	49.3 (1.94)	84.4 (3.32)	79.7 (3.14)	74.3 (2.93)	59.3 (2.33)	76.3 (3.00)	85.0 (3.35)	80.9 (3.19)	102.1 (4.02)	94.4 (3.72)	943.1 (37.13)
Average rainfall mm (inches)	23.4 (0.92)	23.2 (0.91)	33.8 (1.33)	79.8 (3.14)	79.7 (3.14)	74.3 (2.93)	59.3 (2.33)	76.3 (3.00)	85.0 (3.35)	80.5 (3.17)	96.8 (3.81)	48.8 (1.92)	760.7 (29.95)
Average snowfall cm (inches)	57.0 (22.4)	53.9 (21.2)	15.5 (6.1)	4.6 (1.8)	0.0 (0.0)	0.0 (0.0)	0.0 (0.0)	0.0 (0.0)	0.0 (0.0)	0.39 (0.15)	5.4 (2.1)	45.7 (18.0)	182.4 (71.8)
Average precipitation days (≥ 0.2 mm)	12.9	10.9	9.2	11.3	12.4	11.4	8.5	10.4	11.9	13.1	13.1	13.4	138.4
Average rainy days (≥ 0.2 mm)	3.4	2.9	5.0	10.5	12.4	11.4	8.5	10.4	11.9	12.9	11.9	6.2	107.2
Average snowy days (≥ 0.2 cm)	10.0	8.1	4.5	1.0	0.0	0.0	0.0	0.0	0.0	0.23	1.6	7.5	32.9
Source: Environment Canada

=== Landscape ===
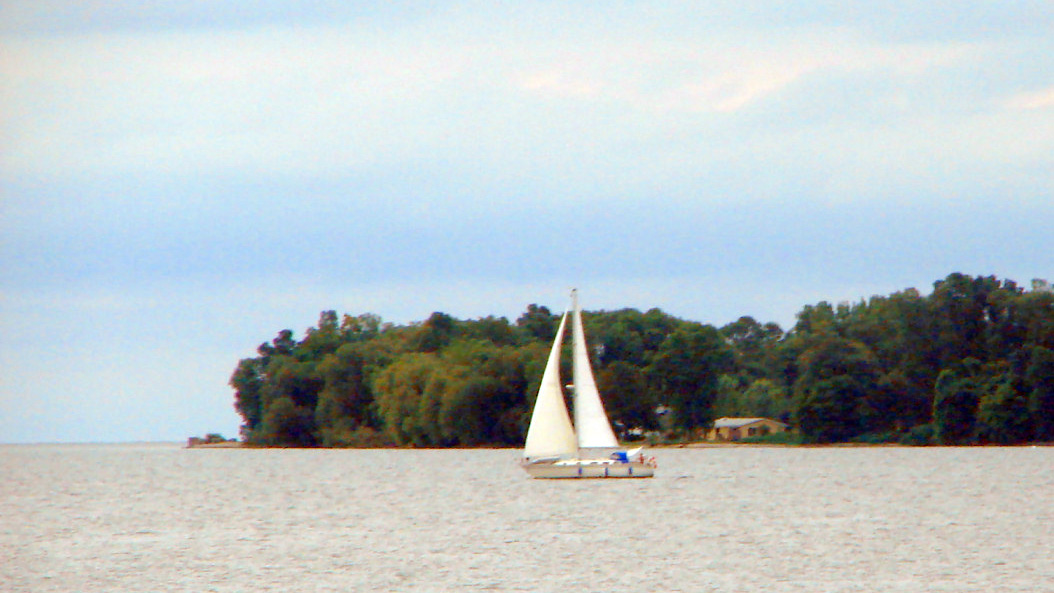
Indian Point of Cressy Point, easternmost point of Prince Edward County and entrance to the Bay of Quinte.

Prince Edward County is a community encompassing approximately 1,000 square kilometres (390 sq mi), with over 500 kilometres (310 mi) of shoreline (including inland lakes and bordered by Lake Ontario) with beaches and limestone rich soil.

=== Communities ===
Prince Edward County includes the population centres of Picton and Wellington and the communities of Albury, Ameliasburg, Bloomfield, Carrying Place, Cherry Valley, Consecon, Cressy, Demorestville, Fawcettville, Glenora, Hillier, Lake on the Mountain, Milford, Mountain View, Northport, Rednersville, Rosehall, Rossmore, Salmon Point, Sophiasburgh, Waupoos, Waupoos Island, West Lake, Woodrous, and Yerexville.

== Demographics ==
Prince Edward County, Ontario historical populations
Year	Pop.	±%
1996	25,046	—
2001	24,901	−0.6%
2006	25,496	+2.4%
2011	25,258	−0.9%
2016	24,735	−2.1%
2021	25,704	+3.9%

In the 2021 Census of Population conducted by Statistics Canada, Prince Edward County had a population of 25,704 living in 11,332 of its 13,557 total private dwellings, a change of 3.9% from its 2016 population of 24,735. With a land area of 1,052.61 km^{2} (406.41 sq mi), it had a population density of 24.4/km^{2} (63.2/sq mi) in 2021.

Canada census – Prince Edward County community profile

	2021	2016	2011
Population	25,704 (+3.9% from 2016)	24,735 (−2.1% from 2011)	25,258 (−0.9% from 2006)
Land area	1,052.61 km^{2} (406.41 sq mi)	1,050.49 km^{2} (405.60 sq mi)	1,050.45 km^{2} (405.58 sq mi)
Population density	24.4/km^{2} (63/sq mi)	23.5/km^{2} (61/sq mi)	24.0/km^{2} (62/sq mi)
Median age	56.8 (M: 55.6, F: 57.6)	54.5 (M: 53.8, F: 55.2)	51.6 (M: 50.8, F: 52.2)
Private dwellings	13,557 (total)	12,899 (total)	12,397 (total)
Median household income		$66,140

References: 2021 2016 2011

== Tourism ==
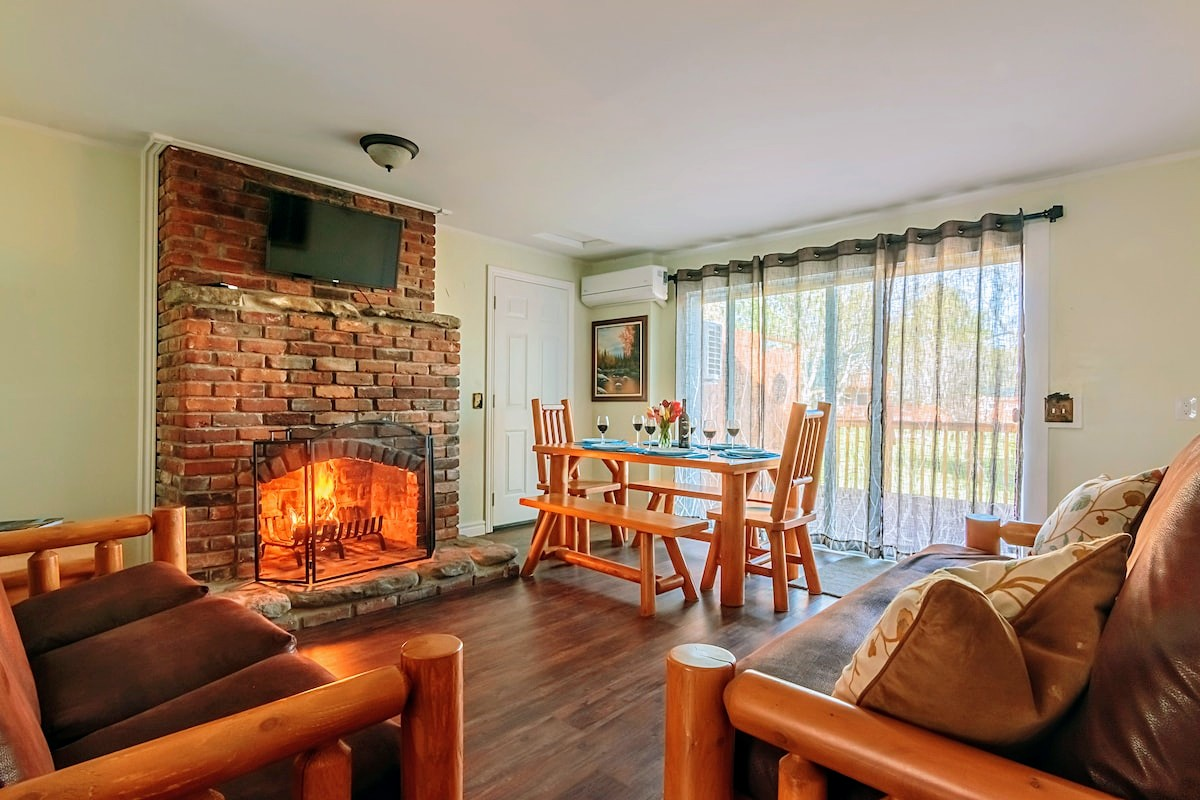
Interior of a 3-season rental cottage, in Prince Edward County near Sandbanks Provincial Park

Prince Edward County has become a vacation destination for its cottage country landscape, larger beaches at Sandbanks Provincial Park and North Beach Provincial Park, alongside its wineries, craft breweries, cideries, arts and cultural events. In 2021, Prince Edward County employed 875 people in the accommodation and food services sector. In 2021, 290 people reported being employed in the arts, entertainment and recreation sector. Accommodations include travel rentals, campsite areas, upscale resorts, waterfront cottages, B&B establishments, individualized hotels, and old-world inns.

=== Wineries, distilleries, and cider ===
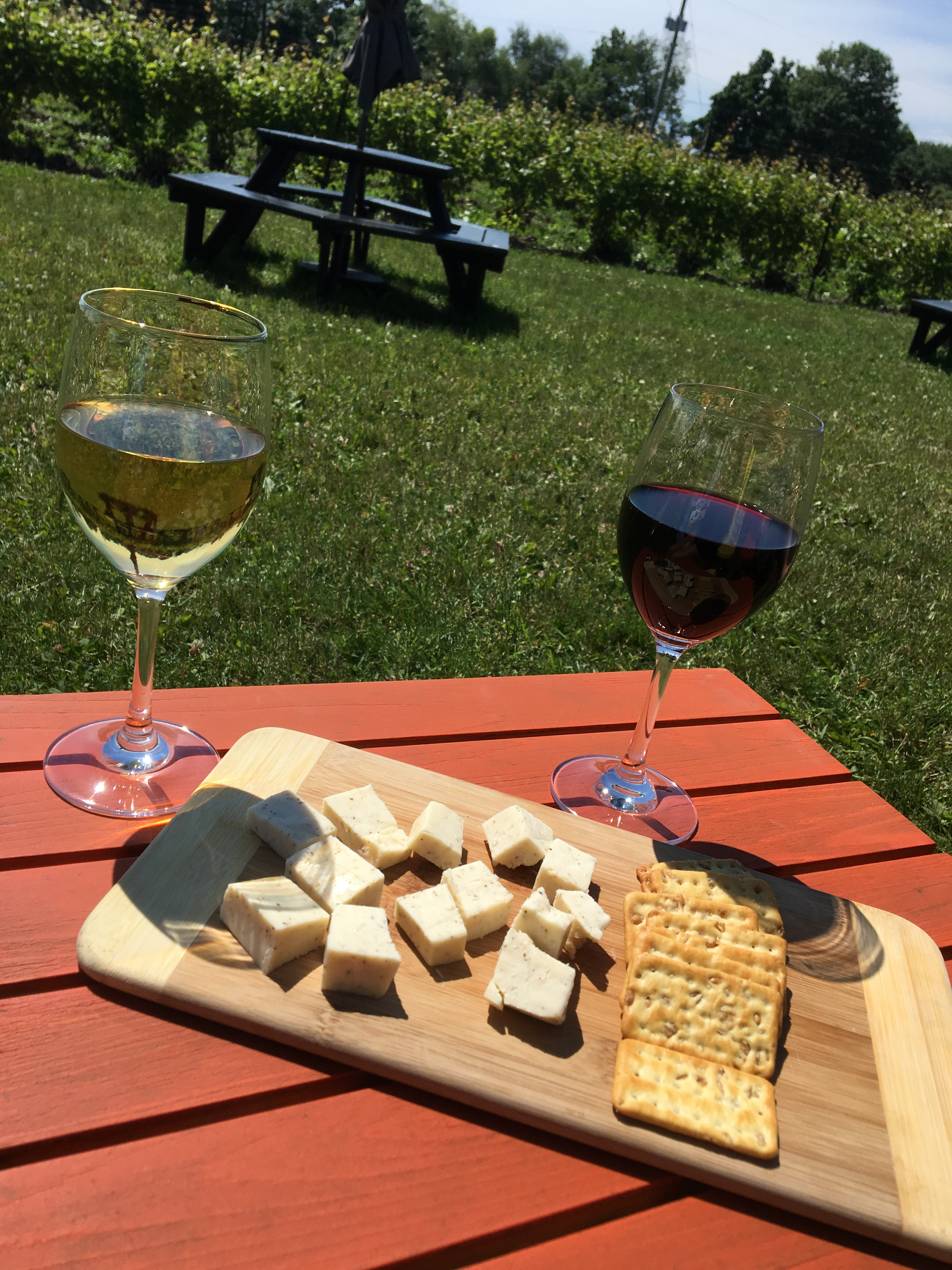
Sandbanks Estate Winery

Prince Edward County was designated as the fourth and newest Designated Viticultural Area (DVA) in Ontario in 2007. A DVA is a wine-producing region for which rules and regulations are set down by the Vintners Quality Alliance (VQA) of Ontario. VQA Ontario is an organization officially delegated by the government of Ontario to administer and enforce the Vintners Quality Alliance Act, 1999 There are currently some 42 commercial wineries (as of 2015) and over 50 wine grape growers in Prince Edward County, cultivating more than 700 acres (280 hectares) of vineyard, producing 757 tons of grapes and 6130 hectolitres of wine annually (as of 2007).

PEC is also home to many distilleries, and hard-cider companies.

=== Music festivals ===
Prince Edward County is home to the Music at Port Milford Chamber Music Academy & Festival, Classical Unbound Festival, the PEC Jazz Festival, the Prince Edward County Chamber Music Festival and the Base 31 music hall.

Music at Port Milford, established in 1987 is said to bring together promising young musicians for a chamber music summer camp and festival on the shores of South Bay. In the summer, PEC also hosts the Classical Unbound Festival, with performances of classical music in unconventional venues and contexts by Canadian musicians, and the Jazz Festival in the month of August. Some of Canada's most prolific jazz musicians gather in the county for this festival.

=== Water activities ===
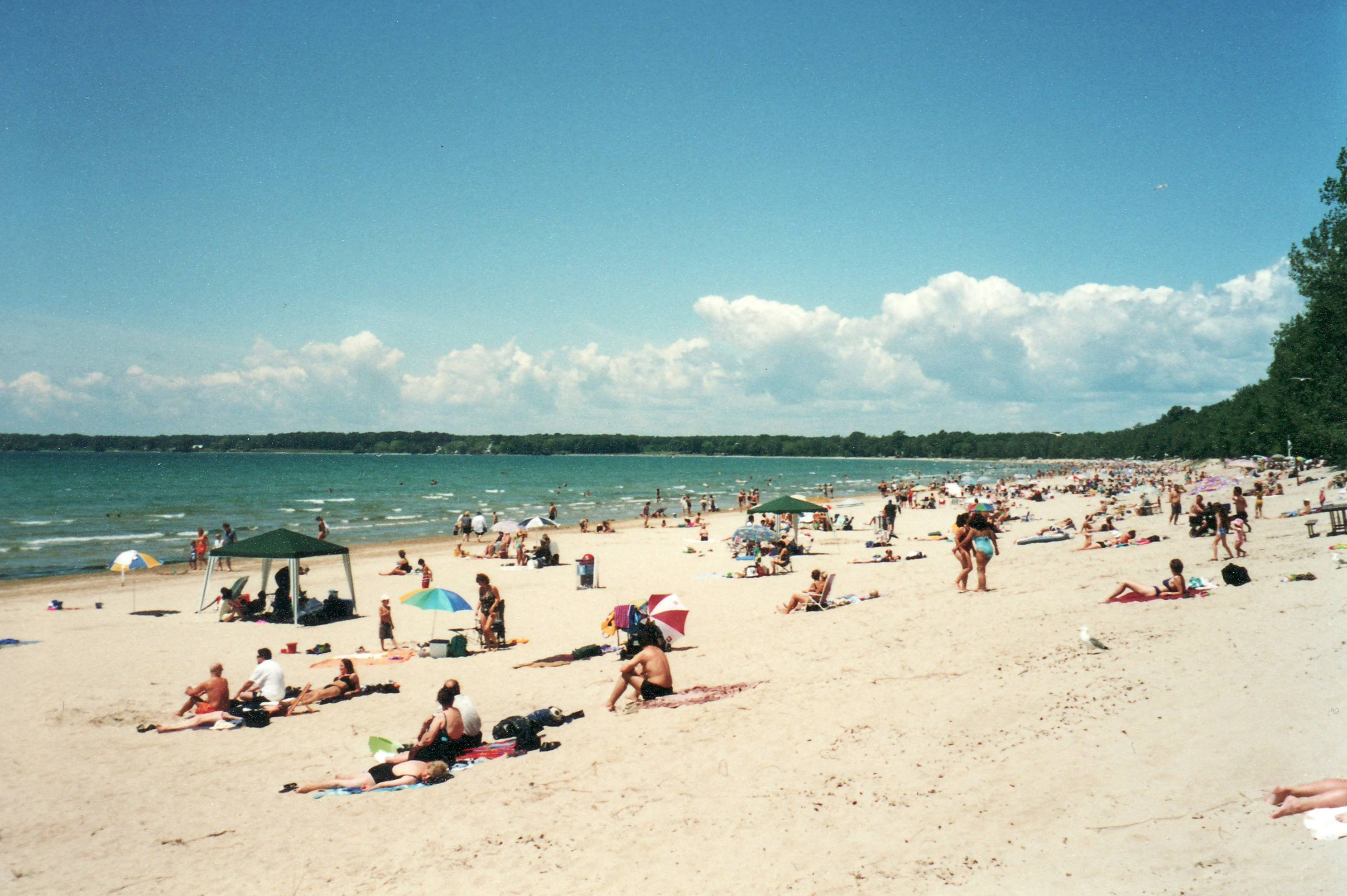
Lake Ontario, Sandbanks Provincial Park

Prince Edward County's main water attractions are said to be its white sand beaches. Together, Sandbanks Provincial Park, North Beach Provincial Park attract over 600,000 visitors yearly. There are numerous campgrounds throughout the County which allow tourists to enjoy water-sports such as those offered through Westlake Wakeboarding School, kayaking, canoeing, tubing, and more.

Beside the historic Crystal Palace is the County Youth Park. While the region is known for a large retirement community, young people come to the County to visit the skatepark and playground located in the corner of the Picton Fairgrounds property (which also holds the Picton Arena, the Prince Edward Curling Club & Crystal Palace). For example, the YoungLife youth event "Road Rage" had teens of all ages visiting skateboard parks across Ontario and then entering their homemade skateboarding video into a contest; Picton was one of their stops.

=== Gastronomy ===
With an increasing number of cultural activities, due to the migration of artists and chefs to the area, the County has established a niche in the new Creative Economy.

"It's yet another point of pride for Prince Edward County, which has become the gastronomic capital of Ontario — a fertile island bursting with vineyards, organic farms and a community of artists and chefs. Tucked into the 'golden triangle' between Toronto, Montreal and Ottawa, it is the province's newest Designated Viticultural Area, which helps identify the origin of a wine and its grapes.” (The Globe and Mail)

=== Birding ===
Events also include the Spring Birding Festival; Prince Edward County Authors' Festival; the County Jazz Festival, a summer event; the Prince Edward County Music Festival (a chamber music series) held on the same fall weekend as the Prince Edward County Studio and Gallery Tour; "Music at Port Milford," a summer music festival and school for string students from 12–18 years old, and an annual season of professional theatre produced by Festival Players of Prince Edward County.

=== Theatre ===
One of the few surviving art-deco movie houses in Ontario, Picton's downtown Regent Theatre, is host to a variety of plays, musicals and art movie screenings throughout the year. Prince Edward County has a live comedy scene with Taste That! producing regular improv and sketch comedy shows throughout the County since 2015, and the annual Comedy Country festival that pairs local acts with professional comedians from across Canada. Theatre companies include: the County Stage Company, Prince Edward Community Theatre and The Marysburgh Mummers.

=== Barn Quilt Tour ===
The region is known for its quilt trail of painted wooden or metal quilt squares hung on local buildings.

== Sports ==
=== Hockey ===
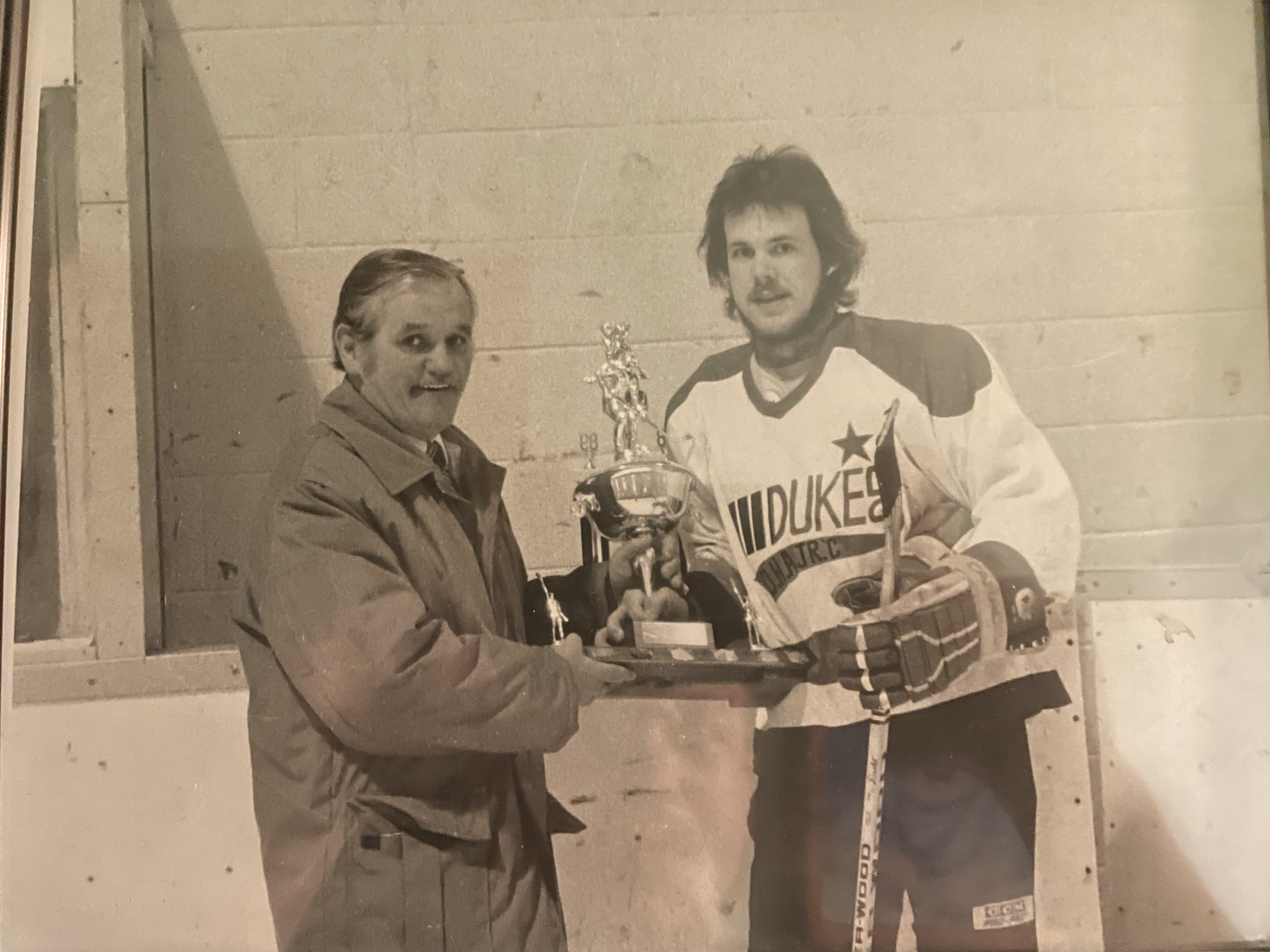
Howie Dowdle receiving the top scorer award in his record setting season with the Wellington Dukes.

Wellington Dukes, located in the village of Wellington, 15 kilometers west of Picton in Prince Edward County, are a prominent fixture in the II-tier league. Over the past twelve seasons, the Wellington Dukes consistently secure top positions in their league.

The Prince Edward Community Centre at 375 Main Street serves as the home arena for the Picton Pirates Junior C Hockey Team, known as the "Patcheyes." The Picton Pirates, founded in 1989, participate in the Eastern Ontario Junior C Hockey League.

=== Sailing ===
Prince Edward County boasts over 500 kilometers of shoreline, offering numerous sheltered harbors and boating facilities. The region's rich sailing history is preserved at the Mariners Park Museum in South Marysburgh. Additionally, Picton is home to the Archives and Collections Society which houses an extensive collection of documents related to the Great Lakes, maritime history, and navigation.

== Government ==
Map of Prince Edward County, showing the towns, villages and townships of its ten wards.

Despite the official name, Prince Edward is not a county by the standard Ontario definition. It is a single-tier municipal government and handles all municipal services. The former county seat and current council hall is located at the Shire Hall, in Picton. Officially, the area is the smallest single-tier municipality in Ontario and consists of the merged governments of the original county and the 10 former towns, villages and townships, that governed the area until 1997.

Ward No.	Name
1	Picton
2	Bloomfield
3	Wellington
4	Ameliasburgh
5	Athol
6	Hallowell
7	Hillier
8	North Marysburgh
9	South Marysburgh
10	Sophiasburgh

== Education ==
=== Post-secondary ===
Prince Edward County is near top educational institutions in Kingston and Belleville including Queen’s University, the Royal Military College of Canada, St. Lawrence College and Loyalist College.

=== Primary and secondary ===
The Hastings and Prince Edward District School Board serves close to 17,000 students each day at 46 elementary and eight secondary schools. The district covers a wide geographical area of 7,221 square kilometers bordered by Maynooth to the north, Deseronto to the east, Prince Edward County to the south and Quinte West to the west.

The Algonquin and Lakeshore Catholic District School Board serve students of the Roman Catholic faith. Approximately 15,000 students attend 36 elementary schools and 5 secondary schools in this school district

Sonrise Christian Academy is located at 58 Johnson St. in Picton and offers K–8 education from a Biblical worldview to families in Prince Edward County.

Albert College in nearby Belleville is attended by many Prince Edward County residents as it is a short bus ride away.

Previously the Prince Edward County Board of Education served the county.

== Media ==
=== Print ===
- Wellington Times (Every Wednesday)
- The Picton Gazette (Every Tuesday)
- The County Weekly News (Every Thursday)
- County Live
- LIFE AU LAIT Magazine (LIFEAULAIT.com)
- County Magazine (Quarterly)

=== Radio ===
Frequency	Call Sign	Branding	Format	Owner
FM 99.3	CJPE	99.3 County FM	Country music	Prince Edward County Radio Corporation

== Emergency services ==
The county is served by 1 EMS station of Hastings-Quinte EMS. Policing is provided from the Ontario Provincial Police detachment located in Picton. The mainly-volunteer Prince Edward County Fire Department operates from ten fire stations located throughout the municipality.

== Notable residents ==
- Guido Basso, flugelhornist
- J. D. Carpenter, author
- Gord Downie, lead singer The Tragically Hip is noted as saying during a concert in Belleville, Ontario that he had taken up occasional residence in the County.
- Fox sisters Catherine (called Kate) (1837-1892) and Margaretta (called Maggie) (1833-1893) Fox. Born and raised "in or near Consecon" where their father owned a farm. The family moved to Hydesville, New York in 1847.
- Raymond Myers Gorssline, 12th Surgeon General of Canada
- Sarah Keenleyside, interior designer and television host
- Jamie Kennedy, chef and owner-operator of Jamie Kennedy Kitchens
- Janet Lunn, author
- John A. Macdonald, first Canadian Prime Minister, lived for three years at Glenora, where his father operated a grist mill. In 1833, Macdonald returned to the Picton area to take over a law practice. He became the first secretary of the Prince Edward Young Men’s Society in 1834 and served as secretary of the Prince Edward District School Board.
- Kent Monkman, painter and visual artist
- Al Purdy, poet who moved to Ameliasburgh in the 1950s.
- Bill Reddick, potter
- Justin Rutledge, singer-songwriter
- Astrid Young, singer-songwriter

== See also ==
- Royal eponyms in Canada
- List of Ontario census divisions
- List of townships in Ontario
- List of summer colonies
