= Sophiasburgh Township =

Historic township in Ontario, Canada

Coordinates: 44°05′14″N 77°12′54″W

Sophiasburgh is an historic township in southern Ontario, Canada, one of the three original townships that formed Prince Edward County. The other two townships were Ameliasburgh and Marysburgh. It was named in 1798 after Princess Sophia, the fifth daughter of George III. The township was amalgamated into the Corporation of the County of Prince Edward, a single tier municipality, on January 1, 1998.

After the American Revolution, a number of United Empire Loyalists who settled in the area of Picton Bay. The White Chapel, north of Picton, was the first Methodist church built in the county.

== See also ==
- List of townships in Ontario
- Royal eponyms in Canada
