= James Simeon McCuaig =

Canadian politician

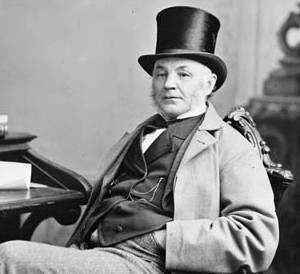

Member of Parliament for Prince Edward
- In office 1879–1882
- Preceded by: Walter Ross
- Succeeded by: John Milton Platt

Ontario MPP
- In office 1872–1872
- Preceded by: William Anderson
- Succeeded by: Gideon Striker
- Constituency: Prince Edward

Personal details
- Born: September 29, 1819 Picton, Upper Canada
- Died: August 4, 1888 (aged 68) Picton, Ontario
- Party: Conservative
- Spouse(s): Julia Isabella Glass; Maria Augusta Pope
- Occupation: Businessman

James Simeon McCuaig (September 29, 1819 – August 4, 1888) was a businessman and political figure in Ontario, Canada. He represented Prince Edward in the Legislative Assembly of Ontario in 1872, and in the House of Commons of Canada as a Conservative member from 1879 to 1882.

He was born in Picton in Upper Canada in 1819, the son of John McCuaig, was educated there and established himself in business in Picton. He owned steamships that operated on Lake Ontario and Lake Erie. McCuaig served two years as Inspector of Provincial Canals. He ran unsuccessfully for a seat in the assembly for the Province of Canada in 1854.

McCuaig was married twice: first to Julia Isabella Glass and then to Maria Augusta Pope. He died near Picton at the age of 68.

== Controverted provincial member ==
In the 1871 general election, Liberal Gideon Striker defeated incumbent William Andersons in Prince Edward.

1871 Ontario general election: Prince Edward
| Party | Candidate | Votes | % |
|---|---|---|---|
| Liberal | Gideon Striker | 1,522 | 52.23 |
| Conservative | William Anderson | 1,392 | 47.77 |
| Turnout | | 2,914 | 78.19 |
| Eligible voters | | 3,727 | |
Election voided
Source: Elections Ontario

Following the election, Conservative incumbent William Anderson launched a petition under the Controverted Elections Act of 1871 against Liberal Gideon Striker alleging, as reported by court reports, " the usual allegations of bribery, etc." The matter was heard by Chief Justice William Buell Richards on September 27, 1871. Chief Justice Richards determined that the allegation of bribery was not established. Striker's counsel however admitted that his agents hired persons to convey voters to the polls (provide transportation), without the knowledge or involvement of the Striker. Chief Justice Richards nonetheless ruled that corrupt practices had taken place and is sufficient to affect the result of the election, and voided Striker's election.

The seat was declared vacant on December 8th, 1871 when the ruling was recorded in the journal of the Legislative Assembly on December 8th, and a writ of by-election was issued.

Ontario provincial by-election, December 22 and 29, 1971: Prince Edward Previous election voided
| Party | Candidate | Votes | % |
|---|---|---|---|
| Liberal | Gideon Striker | 1,644 | 49.76 |
| Conservative | James Simeon McCuaig | 1,660 (Note: Lewis reported 1669 votes for McCuaig. However, the court ruling specifically noted McCuaig's 1660 vote tally and the resulting "majority for respondent, 16") | 50.24 |
| Total valid votes | | 3,304 | 100.0 |
Court on petition found that 35 persons in the Township of Hillier not eligible to vote casted ballots for McCuaig, and consequently declared Striker having been elected.
Source: History of the Electoral Districts, Legislatures and Ministries of the Province of Ontario

Anderson opted not to contest the subsequent byelection, and was replaced by James Simeon McCuaig, who bested Striker by a margin of 16 votes. The result of the by-election was also contested under the Controverted Elections Act of 1871, and was heard by Justice Morrison on August 27, 1872. The Court found that the updated 1871 voters' list used at the Township of Hillier was not properly certified, and that only voters on the 1870 voters roll were legally eligible to vote. Upon review of the two versions of list and the poll books, Morrison found that of the 201 votes received by McCuaig in Hillier, 35 were cast by persons who should not have been allowed to vote, resulting in a vote deficit of 19 for McCuaig, and declared Stricker returned by the election accordingly.

McCuaig was formally unseated on January 8, 1873 when the court ruling was recorded in the journal of the Legislative Assembly, and Striker was accordingly sworn in and took his seat for the second time.

== Federal MP ==
With the court ruing already known by end of August, McCuaig did not wait to be formally unseated. He instead sought the House of Commons seat in the dominion election held in October 1872. He was unsuccessful that year, but was later elected to the House of Commons in 1878 supporting temperance in Prince Edward County. Out of six electoral bids, that was his only successful run.

=== Federal ===
1867 Canadian federal election: Prince Edward
| Party | Candidate | Votes |
|---|---|---|
| Liberal | Walter Ross | 1,779 |
| Conservative | James McCuaig | 942 |
Source: Canadian Elections Database

1872 Canadian federal election: Prince Edward
| Party | Candidate | Votes |
|---|---|---|
| Liberal | Walter Ross | 1,759 |
| Conservative | James Simeon McCuaig | 1,625 |
Source: Canadian Elections Database

1874 Canadian federal election: Prince Edward
| Party | Candidate | Votes |
|---|---|---|
| Liberal | Walter Ross | 1,775 |
| Conservative | James Simeon McCuaig | 1,649 |

1878 Canadian federal election: Prince Edward
| Party | Candidate | Votes |
|---|---|---|
| Conservative | James Simeon McCuaig | 1,991 |
| Liberal | John M. Platt | 1,701 |

1882 Canadian federal election: Prince Edward
| Party | Candidate | Votes |
|---|---|---|
| Liberal | John M. Platt | 1,944 |
| Conservative | James Simeon McCuaig | 1,925 |
