= Clarence Milligan =

Canadian politician

Clarence Adam Milligan

Member of Parliament for Prince Edward—Lennox
- In office June 1957 – June 1968

Personal details
- Born: 12 February 1904 Tamworth, Ontario
- Died: 25 May 1993 (aged 89) Napanee, Ontario
- Party: Progressive Conservative
- Spouse(s): Annie Margaret Gilmour m 7 Apr 1926
- Profession: Farmer

Clarence Adam Milligan (12 February 1904 – 25 May 1993) was a Progressive Conservative party member of the House of Commons of Canada. He was a farmer by career.

Milligan was born at Tamworth, Ontario. He was first elected at the Prince Edward—Lennox riding in the 1957 general election, after defeating incumbent parliamentarian George Tustin for the Progressive Conservative nomination. He was elected to a second term there in the 1958 election then left federal politics at the end of the 24th Canadian Parliament. He made another attempt to return to the House of Commons in the 1968 election at Frontenac—Lennox and Addington as an independent candidate affiliated with the Progressive Conservatives, but was defeated by Almonte Douglas Alkenbrack.

Milligan also served as a president of the Ontario Federation of Agriculture and was living in Napanee in the early 1990s. He owned what is now the developed part of the Town of Napanee. He died in Napanee in 1993.
