= John Caven (Canadian politician) =

Canadian politician

Ontario MPP
- In office 1894–1898
- Preceded by: John Allison Sprague
- Succeeded by: William Ryerson Dempsey
- Constituency: Prince Edward

Personal details
- Born: 1833 Picton, Upper Canada
- Died: April 8, 1898 (aged 64–65) Prince Edward County, Ontario
- Party: Patrons of Industry
- Occupation: Farmer

John Caven (c. 1833 – April 8, 1898) was an Ontario farmer and political figure. He represented Prince Edward in the Legislative Assembly of Ontario as a Liberal-Patrons of Industry member from 1894 to 1898.

He was born in Picton and educated in Marysburgh. Caven served on the council for Prince Edward County and was a public school trustee.
