= George Oscar Alcorn =

Canadian lawyer and politician

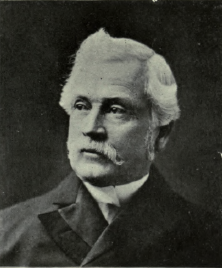

Member of the Canadian Parliament for Prince Edward
- In office 1900–1908
- Preceded by: William Varney Pettet
- Succeeded by: Morley Currie

Personal details
- Born: May 3, 1850 Lennoxville, Canada East
- Died: February 16, 1930 (aged 79) Toronto, Ontario, Canada
- Party: Conservative
- Occupation: Lawyer

George Oscar Alcorn KC (May 3, 1850 – February 16, 1930) was a Canadian lawyer and politician.

Born in Lennoxville, Canada East, (now Sherbrooke, Quebec), the son of Thomas Coke Alcorn and Martha A. Bartlett, he was educated at the Toronto Grammar and Model Grammar Schools. A lawyer, he was admitted to the bar in 1871 and was created a King's Counsel in 1890. He practised law in Belleville, Ontario and Picton, Ontario. He was president of the Prince Edward Liberal-Conservative Association.

He was first elected to the House of Commons of Canada for the Ontario riding of Prince Edward in the 1900 federal election. A Conservative, he was re-elected in the 1904 election but was defeated in the 1908 election.

In 1872, he married Sara Jane Leavitt. In 1910, Alcorn was named Master in Ordinary for the Supreme Court of Ontario and served in that post until 1923.

== Electoral record ==
1900 Canadian federal election: Prince Edward
Party	Candidate	Votes
Conservative	George Oscar Alcorn	2,148
Liberal	William V. Pettet	2,080

1904 Canadian federal election: Prince Edward
Party	Candidate	Votes
Conservative	George Oscar Alcorn	2,253
Liberal	? Rose	2,107

1908 Canadian federal election: Prince Edward
Party	Candidate	Votes
Liberal	Morley Currie	2,341
Conservative	George Oscar Alcorn	2,204
