= Gideon Striker =

Canadian politician

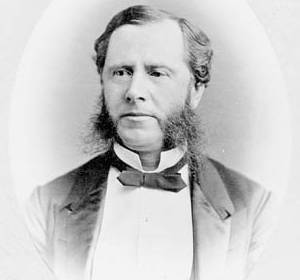

Ontario MPP
- In office 1871–1883
- Preceded by: James Simeon McCuaig
- Succeeded by: James Hart
- Constituency: Prince Edward

Personal details
- Born: 1825 Prince Edward County, Upper Canada
- Died: October 6, 1886 (aged 60–61) Montreal, Quebec
- Party: Liberal
- Occupation: Businessman

Gideon Striker (c. 1825 – October 6, 1886) was an Ontario businessman and political figure. He represented Prince Edward in the Legislative Assembly of Ontario as a Liberal member from 1871 to 1883, with a period of interruption between 1871 and 1873, when his elections was contested in court twice.

He was born in Prince Edward County circa 1825 and educated in Picton. He was a druggist and sold groceries as well. Striker also served as reeve of Picton, warden for the county and lieutenant-colonel in the local militia.

He died suddenly in Montreal in 1886.

== Uneasy path to the legislature ==
In the 1871 Ontario general election, Striker defeated incumbent William Anderson with a reasonable comfortable margin.

1871 Ontario general election: Prince Edward
Party	Candidate	Votes	%
Liberal	Gideon Striker	1,522	52.23
Conservative	William Anderson	1,392	47.77
Turnout		2,914	78.19
Eligible voters		3,727	
Election voided
Source: Elections Ontario

Following the election, Conservative incumbent William Anderson launched a petition under the Controverted Elections Act of 1871 against Liberal Gideon Striker alleging, as reported by court reports, " the usual allegations of bribery, etc." The matter was heard by Chief Justice William Buell Richards on September 27, 1871. Chief Justice Richards determined that the allegation of bribery was not established. Striker's counsel however admitted that his agents hired persons to convey voters to the polls (provide transportation), without the knowledge or involvement of the Striker. Chief Justice Richards nonetheless ruled that corrupt practices had taken place and is sufficient to affect the result of the election, and voided Striker's election.

The seat was declared vacant on December 8th, 1871 when the ruling was recorded in the journal of the Legislative Assembly on December 8th, and a writ of by-election was issued.

Ontario provincial by-election, December 22 and 29, 1971: Prince Edward Previous election voided
Party	Candidate	Votes	%
Liberal	Gideon Striker	1,644	49.76
Conservative	James Simeon McCuaig	1,660 (Note: Lewis reported 1669 votes for McCuaig. However, the court ruling specifically noted McCuaig's 1660 vote tally and the resulting "majority for respondent, 16")	50.24
Total valid votes		3,304	100.0
Court on petition found that 35 persons in the Township of Hillier not eligible to vote casted ballots for McCuaig, and consequently declared Striker having been elected.
Source: History of the Electoral Districts, Legislatures and Ministries of the Province of Ontario

Anderson opted not to contest the subsequent byelection, and was replaced by James Simeon McCuaig, who bested Striker by a margin of 16 votes. The result of the by-election was also contested under the Controverted Elections Act of 1871, and was heard by Justice Morrison on August 27, 1872. The Court found that the updated 1871 voters' list used at the Township of Hillier was not properly certified, and that only voters on the 1870 voters roll were legally eligible to vote. Upon review of the two versions of list and the poll books, Morrison found that of the 201 votes received by McCuaig in Hillier, 35 were cast by persons who should not have been allowed to vote, resulting in a vote deficit of 19 for McCuaig, and declared Stricker returned by the election accordingly.

McCuaig was formally unseated on January 8, 1973 when the court ruling was recorded in the journal of the Legislative Assembly, and Striker was accordingly sworn in and took his seat for the second time.

=== Subsequent re-election ===
While his margins of victory were small, Striker's 1875 and 1879 re-elections were not subject to challenge.

1875 Ontario general election: Prince Edward
Party	Candidate	Votes	%
Liberal	Gideon Striker	1,762	50.91
Conservative	R. Clapp	1,699	49.09
Total valid votes		3,461	77.90
Eligible voters		4,443	
Liberal hold			
Source: Elections Ontario

1879 Ontario general election: Prince Edward
Party	Candidate	Votes	%	±%
Liberal	Gideon Striker	1,894	50.47	−0.44
Conservative	R. Clapp	1,859	49.53	+0.44
Total valid votes		3,753	73.78	−4.12
Eligible voters		5,087		
Liberal hold		Swing		−0.44
Source: Elections Ontario
