= Horace Stanley Colliver =

Canadian politician

Ontario MPP
- In office 1928–1934
- Preceded by: William Edgar Raney
- Succeeded by: Riding abolished
- In office 1923–1926
- Preceded by: Nelson Parliament
- Succeeded by: William Edgar Raney
- Constituency: Prince Edward

Personal details
- Born: February 10, 1874 Hallowell, Ontario
- Died: December 16, 1957 (aged 83) Picton, Ontario
- Party: Conservative
- Spouse: Eva E. Garrison (m. 1896)
- Occupation: Businessman

Horace Stanley Colliver (February 10, 1874 – December 16, 1957) was a businessman and political figure in Ontario. He represented Prince Edward in the Legislative Assembly of Ontario from 1923 to 1926 and from 1928 to 1934 as a Conservative member.

He was born in Hallowell township, the son of George Colliver and Belle Spafford, and was educated in Cherry Valley. In 1896, Colliver married Eva E. Garrison. He was a wholesale grocer, canner and coal dealer. Colliver served as warden for Prince Edward County in 1914 and as mayor of Picton in 1918.

He was successful when he ran for election to the Ontario legislature in 1923. AS a Conservative candidate he took just 17 more votes than the incumbent UFO MPP Parliament to win the seat.

He was defeated by United Farmers candidate William Raney when he ran for reelection in 1926.

Colliver took the seat in a 1928 by-election, after Raney was named a judge. He died in 1957.
