= William Varney =

William Varney may refer to:

- William Varney Pettet (1858–1938), Canadian politician
- William F. Varney (1884–1960), American politician
- Bill Varney (1934–2011), American film sound mixer
