= John Sprague =

John Sprague may refer to:

- John W. Sprague (1817–1893), American soldier and railroad executive
- John Allison Sprague (1844–1907), Ontario farmer and political figure
- John Sprague (doctor), (1718-1797), American patriot and doctor
