= Henry Herbert Horsey =

Canadian politician

The Honourable Henry Herbert Horsey

Canadian Senator from Ontario
- In office 1928–1942
- Appointed by: William Lyon Mackenzie King

Personal details
- Born: May 31, 1871 Kingston, Ontario, Canada
- Died: January 6, 1942 (aged 70) Kingston, Ontario, Canada
- Party: Liberal
- Relations: Edward Henry Horsey, brother
- Education: Queen's University
- Committees: Chair, Special Committee on Sealing and Fisheries in Pacific Waters (1934)

Henry Herbert Horsey (May 31, 1871 – January 6, 1942) was a Canadian athlete, businessman and Senator.

== Background ==
Born in Kingston, Ontario, the son of Henry Hodge Horsey and Amey Ann Rose, Horsey attended Queen's University at Kingston, Ontario where he was noted as a scholar and athlete as a member of the school's championship rugby teams. He went into business in Ottawa. In 1896, he married Florence Cook.

A friend of Sir Wilfrid Laurier, he was defeated in three attempts to win election to the House of Commons of Canada. He was a Laurier Liberal candidate in Prince Edward during the 1917 federal election and a Liberal candidate in 1921 and again in 1926, the last time in Prince Edward—Lennox.

He was appointed to the Senate of Canada in 1928 by William Lyon Mackenzie King.

In his professional life, Horsey was active in the insurance and brokerage business and toured East Asia for his company. He was also a director of Ottawa Light, Heat and Power Company and the Ottawa Electric Railway Company. Horsey died in Kingston at the age of 70.

His brother Edward Henry served in the House of Commons.

== Electoral record ==
1917 Canadian federal election: Prince Edward
Party	Candidate	Votes
Government	William Bernard Rickart Hepburn	3,231
Opposition	Herbert Horsey	1,755

1921 Canadian federal election: Prince Edward
Party	Candidate	Votes
Conservative	John Hubbs	3,839
Progressive	James Redner Anderson	2,730
Liberal	Herbert Horsey	2,357
