= Absalom Greeley =

Canadian politician

Ontario MPP
- In office 1867–1870
- Preceded by: Riding established
- Succeeded by: William Anderson
- Constituency: Prince Edward

Personal details
- Born: April 18, 1823
- Died: October 28, 1885 (aged 62) Kansas City, Missouri
- Party: Conservative
- Spouse: Millicent Ann Roblin (m. 1846)
- Children: 9

Absalom Greeley (April 18, 1823 – October 28, 1885) was the Member of Provincial Parliament (MPP) for Prince Edward in the 1st Legislative Assembly of Ontario from 1867 to 1870. Greeley ran on the political platform of the Reform movement; however he was thought to be a Yankee Tory; a conservative with American origins in the American Whig Party. He is also supportive of the Family Compact which is not consistent with a Reform platform.

== Origins ==
Absalom Greeley is believed to have emigrated from Maine, U.S., with his parents in the early half of the 19th century. His father had been a surveyor there. Although largely self-educated, he is credited with good learning and significant intellect. His place of residence after 1881 is unknown.

== Political history ==
In 1869, he is reported in Toronto newspapers as supporting the extravagant expenses at the Governors residence in an attempt to curry favour with the Family Compact. He is also reported to have tried to sell his party nomination for a county seat as Reeve; an attempt which eventually failed and became public knowledge. Greeley did not run in the 1871 election. In 1881, Greeley was charged with forgery in the town of Picton, Prince Edward County.

== Parliamentary Work ==
As an MPP, he worked on the following Committees:

=== Standing Committees ===
- Standing Committee on Printing
- Standing Committee on Standing Orders

=== Select Committees ===
- Select Committee to inquire into and report upon the endowment and utility of Upper Canada College and its relationship to the educational system
- Select Committee to enquire into the usefulness and cost of wooden railways as a means of furthering the settlement of the country
- Select Committee to consider Bill 33 Respecting Union Houses and Religious Worship
- Select Committee to consider Bill 14 registration of births and deaths and marriages
- Select Committee appointed to examine in to the working of the common and grammar school system of Ontario
- Select Committee to consider Bill 30, An Act for the Encouragement of Agriculture, Horticulture, Arts and Manufactures
- Select Committee to Revise the Standing Orders of this House Affecting Bills relating to Railways, Canals and Telegraphs
- Special Committee to consider the Municipal and Assessments Act

== Electoral history ==
1867 Ontario general election: Prince Edward
Party	Candidate	Votes	%
Liberal	Absalom Greeley	1,605	58.66
Conservative	Mr. Solmes	1,131	41.34
Total valid votes		2,736	76.53
Eligible voters		3,575	
Liberal pickup new district.			
Source: Elections Ontario
