= James Hart (Ontario politician) =

Canadian politician

Ontario MPP
- In office 1883–1886
- Preceded by: Gideon Striker
- Succeeded by: John Allison Sprague
- Constituency: Prince Edward

Personal details
- Born: c. 1820 Lennox County, Upper Canada
- Died: September 17, 1898 (aged 77–78) Picton, Ontario, Canada
- Party: Liberal
- Spouse: Sarah Ann Demorest (m. 1841)

James Benjamin Hart (c. 1820 - 1898) was an Ontario merchant and political figure. He represented Prince Edward in the Legislative Assembly of Ontario from 1883 to 1886 as a Liberal member.

He was born in Lennox County. In 1841, he married Sarah Ann Demorest. Hart served as reeve for Sophiasburgh Township. He lived in Picton.
