= Results of the 1896 Canadian federal election =

1896 Canadian federal election

== Results by Province ==
=== British Columbia ===
Results in British Columbia
Party	Seats	Second	Third	Votes	%	+/-
Conservative	2	4	2	9,231	50.85	
Liberals	4	1	1	8,921	49.15	
Total	6			18,152	100.0	

=== Manitoba ===
Results in Manitoba
Party	Seats	Second	Third	Votes	%	+/-
Conservative	3	3		12,498	38.01	
Liberals	2	4		11,519	35.03	
McCarthyite	1			3,073	9.34	
Liberal–Conservative	1			2,961	9	
Patrons of Industry			3	2,833	8.62	
Total	7			32,884	100.0	

=== New Brunswick ===
Results in New Brunswick
Party	Seats	Second	Third	Votes	%	+/-
Liberals	4	9		27,213	42.45	
Conservative	4	5		20,179	31.48	
Liberal–Conservative	5			11,220	17.5	
Independent	1		4	5,488	8.56	
Total	14			64,100	100.0	

=== Northwest Territories ===
Results in Northwest Territories
Party	Seats	Second	Third	Votes	%	+/-
Liberals	3			8,191	46.05	
Conservative	1	3		7,811	43.91	
Independent		1	2	1,786	10.04	
Total	4			17,788	100.0	

=== Nova Scotia ===
Results in Nova Scotia
Party	Seats	Second	Third	Votes	%	+/-
Liberals	10	7	3	49,176	48.84	
Conservative	9	10		47,342	47.02	
Liberal–Conservative	1			3,430	3.41	
Independent			1	737	0.73	
Total	20			100,685	100.0	

=== Ontario ===
Results in Ontario
Party	Seats	Second	Third	Fourth	Fifth	Votes	%	+/-
Conservative	34	39	6			167,663	39.72	
Liberals	43	28	2			165,880	39.3	
Patrons of Industry	2	15	10			33,957	8.05	
Liberal–Conservative	7	1				16,511	3.91	
Independent Conservative	4					12,209	2.89	
McCarthyite	1	3	5	1		9,788	2.32	
Protestant Protective Association		1	3	1		6,233	1.48	
Independent			5	3	1	5,859	1.39	
Independent Liberal	1					2,353	0.56	
Unknown		1				1,622	0.38	
Total	92					422,075	100.0	

=== Prince Edward Island ===
Results in Prince Edward Island
Party	Seats	Second	Third	Votes	%	+/-
Liberals	2	3	1	9,515	50.96	
Conservative	2	2		7,564	40.51	
Liberal–Conservative	1			1,593	8.53	
Total	5			18,672	100.0	

=== Quebec ===
Results in Quebec
Party	Seats	Second	Votes	%	+/-
Liberals	49	14	120,229	53.51	
Conservative	16	45	101,000	44.95	
Patrons of Industry		1	1,485	0.66	
Nationalist		1	1,150	0.51	
Liberal–Conservative		1	826	0.37	
Total	65		224,690	100.0	
