= John Hubbs =

Canadian politician

Member of Parliament for Prince Edward
- In office December 1921 – October 1925
- Preceded by: William Bernard Rickart Hepburn
- Succeeded by: riding dissolved

Member of Parliament for Prince Edward—Lennox
- In office October 1925 – May 1930
- Preceded by: riding created
- Succeeded by: John Aaron Weese

Personal details
- Born: 20 November 1874 Wellington, Ontario
- Died: 1 June 1952 (aged 77) Hamilton, Ontario
- Party: Conservative
- Spouse(s): Nancy Alma Hudgin m. 12 June 1895
- Profession: canner, manufacturer

John Hubbs (20 November 1874 – 1 June 1952) was a Conservative member of the House of Commons of Canada. He was born in Wellington, Ontario and became a canner and manufacturer.

The son of Charles Hubbs and Margaret Baird, Hubbs attended secondary school at Picton, Ontario. He became owner of John Hubbs Canning Company.

He was first elected to Parliament at the Prince Edward riding in the 1921 general election. After riding boundary changes, Hubbs became a candidate at Prince Edward—Lennox for the 1925 election where he won re-election. Hubbs was re-elected there in 1926. After completing his third term in Parliament, Hubbs left federal politics and did not seek re-election in the 1930 vote.
