= Prince Edward (provincial electoral district) =

Former provincial electoral district in Ontario, Canada

Ontario electoral district

Defunct provincial electoral district
- Legislature: Legislative Assembly of Ontario
- District created: 1867
- District abolished: 1933
- First contested: 1867
- Last contested: 1929

Prince Edward was an electoral riding in Ontario, Canada. It was created in 1867 at the time of confederation and was abolished in 1933 before the 1934 election.

== Members of Provincial Parliament ==
Prince Edward
Assembly	Years	Member	Party
1st	1867–1870	Absalom Greeley	Liberal
1st	1870–1871	William Anderson	Conservative
2nd	1871–1871	Gideon Striker	Liberal
2nd	1872–1872	James Simeon McCuaig	Conservative
2nd	1872–1874	Gideon Striker	Liberal
3rd	1875–1879	Gideon Striker	Liberal
4th	1879–1883	Gideon Striker	Liberal
5th	1883–1886	James Hart	Liberal
6th	1886–1890	John Allison Sprague	Liberal
7th	1890–1894	John Allison Sprague	Liberal
8th	1894–1898	John Caven	Patrons of Industry
9th	1898–1902	William Ryerson Dempsey	Conservative
10th	1902–1904	Morley Currie	Liberal
11th	1905–1908	Morley Currie	Liberal
12th	1908–1911	Robert Addison Norman	Conservative
13th	1911–1914	Robert Addison Norman	Conservative
14th	1914–1919	Nelson Parliament	Liberal
15th	1919–1923	Nelson Parliament	Liberal
16th	1923–1926	Horace Stanley Colliver	Conservative
17th	1926–1928	William Edgar Raney	United Farmers
17th	1928–1929	Horace Stanley Colliver	Conservative
18th	1929–1934	Horace Stanley Colliver	Conservative
Sourced from the Ontario Legislative Assembly
Merged into Prince Edward—Lennox before the 1934 election

== Election results ==
1929 Ontario general election
Party	Candidate	Votes	%	±%
Conservative	Horace Stanley Colliver	4,457	53.72	–
Prohibitionist	James H. Porte	3,840	46.28	–
Total valid votes		8,297	99.44	
Total rejected ballots		47	0.56	–
Turnout		8,344	80.37	–
Eligible voters		10,382		
Conservative hold		Swing		–
Source: Elections Ontario

Ontario provincial by-election, November 1, 1927 William Raney appointed to Supreme Court of Ontario
Party	Candidate	Votes
Conservative	Horace Stanley Colliver	acclaimed
Source: Elections Ontario

1926 Ontario general election
Party	Candidate	Votes	%	±%
Progressive	William Raney	4,378	50.28	–
Conservative	Horace Stanley Colliver	4,329	49.72	–0.40
Total valid votes		8,707	99.49	
Total rejected ballots		45	0.51	+0.51
Turnout		8,752	80.46	+9.81
Eligible voters		10,878		
Progressive gain from Conservative		Swing		–
Source: Elections Ontario

1923 Ontario general election
Party	Candidate	Votes	%	±%
Conservative	Horace Stanley Colliver	4,039	50.12	+5.90
Liberal	Nelson Parliament	4,020	49.88	–5.90
Total valid votes		8,059	100.00	
Total rejected ballots		–		
Turnout		8,059	70.65	–8.80
Eligible voters		11,407		
Conservative gain from Liberal		Swing		+5.90
Source: Elections Ontario

1919 Ontario general election
Party	Candidate	Votes	%	±%
Liberal	Nelson Parliament	4,557	55.78	+8.02
Conservative	Robert Addison Norman	3,612	44.22	–1.16
Total valid votes		8,169	93.82	
Total rejected ballots		538	6.18	+5.47
Turnout		8,707	79.45	–11.09
Eligible voters		10,959		
Liberal hold		Swing		+4.59
Source: Elections Ontario

1914 Ontario general election
Party	Candidate	Votes	%	±%
Liberal	Nelson Parliament	1,943	47.76	+5.13
Conservative	Harry Dempsey	1,846	45.38	–11.99
Independent Conservative	Robert Addison Norman	279	6.86	–50.51
Total valid votes		4,068	99.29	
Total rejected ballots		29	0.71	+0.16
Turnout		4,097	90.54	+14.62
Eligible voters		4,525		
Liberal gain from Conservative		Swing		+8.56
Source: Elections Ontario

1911 Ontario general election
Party	Candidate	Votes	%	±%
Conservative	Robert Addison Norman	2,286	57.37	+5.83
Liberal	Stewart Edgar Mathie	1,699	42.63	–
Total valid votes		3,985	99.45	
Total rejected ballots		22	0.55	+0.11
Turnout		4,007	75.92	–10.78
Eligible voters		5,278		
Conservative hold		Swing		+2.92
Source: Elections Ontario

1908 Ontario general election
Party	Candidate	Votes	%	±%
Conservative	Robert Addison Norman	2,221	51.53	+1.59
Independent Conservative	William Petet Niles	2,089	48.47	–
Total valid votes		4,310	99.56	
Total rejected ballots		19	0.44	+0.04
Turnout		4,329	86.70	+0.86
Eligible voters		4,993		
Conservative gain from Liberal		Swing		+0.79
Source: Elections Ontario

1905 Ontario general election
Party	Candidate	Votes	%	±%
Liberal	Morley Currie	2,270	50.06	–1.25
Conservative	Robert Addison Norman	2,265	49.94	+1.25
Total valid votes		4,535	99.60	
Total rejected ballots		18	0.40	+0.31
Turnout		4,553	85.84	+3.79
Eligible voters		5,304		
Liberal hold		Swing		–1.25
Source: Elections Ontario

1902 Ontario general election
Party	Candidate	Votes	%	±%
Liberal	Morley Currie	2,273	51.31	+51.15
Conservative	Levi P. Williams	2,157	48.69	–5.26
Total valid votes		4,430	99.91	
Total rejected ballots		4	0.09	–1.14
Turnout		4,434	82.05	+3.88
Eligible voters		5,404		
Liberal gain from Conservative		Swing		–
Source: Elections Ontario

1898 Ontario general election
Party	Candidate	Votes	%	±%
Conservative	William Ryerson Dempsey	2,387	53.96	+17.16
Independent	John Caven	2,030	45.89	–7.47
Liberal	Nathaniel Sprague	7	0.16	–
Total valid votes		4,424	98.77	
Total rejected ballots		55	1.23	+0.71
Turnout		4,479	78.17	+7.17
Eligible voters		5,730		
Conservative gain from Liberal-Patrons of Industry		Swing		+12.31
Source: Elections Ontario

1894 Ontario general election
Party	Candidate	Votes	%	±%
Liberal-Patrons of Industry	John Caven	2,149	53.35	–
Conservative	James Gibson	1,482	36.79	–13.12
Independent	Isaac Wilson	397	9.86	–
Total valid votes		4,028	99.48	
Total rejected ballots		21	0.52	–0.12
Turnout		4,049	71.00	–0.71
Eligible voters		5,703		
Liberal-Patrons of Industry gain from Liberal		Swing		+6.56
Source: Elections Ontario

1890 Ontario general election
Party	Candidate	Votes	%	±%
Liberal	John Allison Sprague	2,040	50.09	–0.87
Conservative	J. A. Johnson	2,033	49.91	+0.87
Total valid votes		4,073	99.37	
Total rejected ballots		26	0.63	+0.30
Turnout		4,099	71.71	–0.87
Eligible voters		5,716		
Liberal hold		Swing		–0.87
Source: Elections Ontario

1886 Ontario general election
Party	Candidate	Votes	%	±%
Liberal	John Allison Sprague	2,155	50.96	+1.43
Conservative	William Anderson	2,074	49.04	–
Total valid votes		4,229	99.67	
Total rejected ballots		14	0.33	–0.72
Turnout		4,243	72.58	–5.36
Eligible voters		5,846		
Liberal gain from Independent Liberal		Swing		+0.71
Source: Elections Ontario

1883 Ontario general election
Party	Candidate	Votes	%	±%
Independent Liberal	James Hart	2,045	50.47	–
Liberal	Gideon Striker	2,007	49.53	–0.94
Total valid votes		4,052	98.95	
Total rejected ballots		43	1.05	+1.05
Turnout		4,095	77.94	+4.16
Eligible voters		5,254		
Independent Liberal gain from Liberal		Swing		–
Source: Elections Ontario

1879 Ontario general election
Party	Candidate	Votes	%	±%
Liberal	Gideon Striker	1,894	50.47	−0.44
Conservative	R. Clapp	1,859	49.53	+0.44
Total valid votes		3,753	73.78	−4.12
Eligible voters		5,087		
Liberal hold		Swing		−0.44
Source: Elections Ontario

1875 Ontario general election
Party	Candidate	Votes	%
Liberal	Gideon Striker	1,762	50.91
Conservative	R. Clapp	1,699	49.09
Total valid votes		3,461	77.90
Eligible voters		4,443	
Liberal hold			
Source: Elections Ontario

=== 2nd Parliament ===
1871 Ontario general election
Party	Candidate	Votes	%
Liberal	Gideon Striker	1,522	52.23
Conservative	William Anderson	1,392	47.77
Turnout		2,914	78.19
Eligible voters		3,727	
Election voided
Source: Elections Ontario

Following the election, Conservative incumbent William Anderson launched a petition under the Controverted Elections Act of 1871 against Liberal Gideon Striker alleging, as reported by court reports, " the usual allegations of bribery, etc." The matter was heard by Chief Justice William Buell Richards on September 27, 1871. Chief Justice Richards determined that the allegation of bribery was not established. Striker's counsel however admitted that his agents hired persons to convey voters to the polls (provide transportation), without the knowledge or involvement of the Striker. Chief Justice Richards nonetheless ruled that corrupt practices had taken place and is sufficient to affect the result of the election, and voided Striker's election.

The seat was declared vacant on December 8th, 1871 when the ruling was recorded in the journal of the Legislative Assembly on December 8th, and a writ of by-election was issued.

Ontario provincial by-election, December 22 and 29, 1971 Previous election voided
Party	Candidate	Votes	%
Liberal	Gideon Striker	1,644	49.76
Conservative	James Simeon McCuaig	1,660 (Note: Lewis reported 1669 votes for McCuaig. However, the court ruling specifically noted McCuaig's 1660 vote tally and the resulting "majority for respondent, 16")	50.24
Total valid votes		3,304	100.0
Court on petition found that 35 persons in the Township of Hillier not eligible to vote casted ballots for McCuaig, and consequently declared Striker having been elected.
Source: History of the Electoral Districts, Legislatures and Ministries of the Province of Ontario

Anderson opted not to contest the subsequent byelection, and was replaced by James Simeon McCuaig, who bested Striker by a margin of 16 votes. The result of the by-election was also contested under the Controverted Elections Act of 1871, and was heard by Justice Morrison on August 27, 1872. The Court found that the updated 1871 voters' list used at the Township of Hillier was not properly certified, and that only voters on the 1870 voters roll were legally eligible to vote. Upon review of the two versions of list and the poll books, Morrison found that of the 201 votes received by McCuaig in Hillier, 35 were cast by persons who should not have been allowed to vote, resulting in a vote deficit of 19 for McCuaig, and declared Stricker returned by the election accordingly.

McCuaig was formally unseated on January 8, 1873 when the court ruling was recorded in the journal of the Legislative Assembly, and Striker was accordingly sworn in and took his seat for the second time.

=== 1st Parliament ===
Ontario provincial by-election, July 1870 Resignation of Absalom Greeley
Party	Candidate	Votes	%	±%
Conservative	William Anderson	1,337	54.95	+13.62
Independent	S. Sprague	1,096	45.05	
Total valid votes		2,433	100.0	−11.07
Conservative gain from Liberal		Swing		+13.62
Source: History of the Electoral Districts, Legislatures and Ministries of the Province of Ontario

1867 Ontario general election
Party	Candidate	Votes	%
Liberal	Absalom Greeley	1,605	58.66
Conservative	Mr. Solmes	1,131	41.34
Total valid votes		2,736	76.53
Eligible voters		3,575	
Liberal pickup new district.			
Source: Elections Ontario
