= Morley Currie =

Canadian politician

Ontario MPP
- In office 1902–1908
- Preceded by: William Ryerson Dempsey
- Succeeded by: Robert Addison Norman
- Constituency: Prince Edward

Personal details
- Born: June 23, 1869 Picton, Ontario, Canada
- Died: July 11, 1944 (aged 75) Picton, Ontario, Canada
- Party: Liberal
- Spouse: Clara Clarke (m. 1904)
- Occupation: Physician

Morley Currie (June 23, 1869 – July 11, 1944) was an Ontario physician and political figure. He represented Prince Edward in the Legislative Assembly of Ontario from 1902 to 1908 and in the House of Commons of Canada from 1908 to 1911 as a Liberal member.

He was born in Picton, Ontario, the son of George Currie and Catharine Richards, and studied at the University of Toronto, receiving his M.D. in 1895. Currie served as house surgeon for the Metropolitan Society Lying-in Hospital in New York City, later practicing in Toronto and finally Picton. He married Clara Clarke in 1904. Currie was surgeon and captain in the Prince Edward County militia. He was defeated when he ran for reelection in 1911. Currie died in Picton at the age of 75.

== Electoral record ==
1908 Canadian federal election: Prince Edward
Party	Candidate	Votes
Liberal	Morley Currie	2,341
Conservative	George Oscar Alcorn	2,204

1911 Canadian federal election: Prince Edward
Party	Candidate	Votes
Conservative	Bernard Rickart Hepburn	2,304
Liberal	Morley Currie	2,024
