= John Milton Platt =

Canadian politician

For other people named John Platt, see John Platt.

John Milton Platt (April 18, 1840 – September 27, 1919) was a physician and political figure in Ontario, Canada. He represented Prince Edward in the House of Commons of Canada from 1882 to 1891 as a Liberal member.

He was born in Athol Township, Upper Canada, the son of Dyer Platt and Myria Morgan. Platt was educated at the Fort Edward Institute in New York state and at Victoria University in Cobourg. In 1872, Platt married Amelia Branscombe. He also served as a public school inspector and as surgeon for the militia. Platt was editor and publisher for the Picton New Nation. His election in 1888 was overturned after an appeal but he won the by-election that followed. He was defeated by Archibald Campbell Miller when he ran for reelection in 1891. Platt later served as warden for Kingston Penitentiary from 1899 to 1913. He died in Picton at the age of 79.

== Electoral record ==
1887 Canadian federal election: Prince Edward
Party	Candidate	Votes
Liberal	John M. Platt	2,222
Unknown	Robert Clapp	2,151

By-election: On election being declared void:

By-election: 19 March 1988
Party	Candidate	Votes
Liberal	John M. PLATT	2,198
Unknown	Robert CLAPP	1,971

1891 Canadian federal election: Prince Edward
Party	Candidate	Votes
Conservative	Archibald Campbell Miller	2,264
Liberal	John M. Platt	2,225
