= George Tustin =

Canadian politician

Mayor of Napanee, Ontario
- In office 1934–1935

Member of the Canadian Parliament for Prince Edward—Lennox
- In office October 1935 – April 1957
- Preceded by: John Aaron Weese
- Succeeded by: Clarence Milligan

Personal details
- Born: George James Tustin; 19 September 1889 Todmorden, Ontario, Canada
- Died: 19 May 1968 (aged 78) Napanee, Ontario, Canada
- Party: Conservative (1867–1942); Progressive Conservative; National Government
- Spouse(s): Ida Vivan Ashley Harker (m. 4 April 1945)
- Profession: merchant, theatre owner

George James Tustin (19 September 1889 – 19 May 1968) was a Progressive Conservative party, National Government and Conservative member of the House of Commons of Canada. He was born in Todmorden, Ontario and became a merchant and theatre owner by career.

Tustin was a member of the Napanee, Ontario municipal council for a decade, serving as Mayor in 1934 and 1935.

He was first elected to Parliament at the Prince Edward—Lennox riding in the 1935 general election as a candidate with Canada's original Conservative party, then re-elected in 1940 under the National Government banner. After his party's identity changed to the Progressive Conservatives, Tustin was re-elected to Parliament in 1949 and 1953.

He lost the Prince Edward—Lennox Progressive Conservative nomination to Clarence Milligan in the buildup to the 1957 federal election. Tustin was a personal friend and political ally of Progressive Conservative leader John Diefenbaker, and it was suggested at the time that his loss was a setback for Diefenbaker's leadership. Ironically, Diefenbaker's father, William Diefenbaker, once taught Tustin.

Tustin died aged 78 at Napanee, Ontario following a lengthy illness.
