= William Raney =

Canadian politician

William Edgar Raney

Leader of the Progressive Party
- In office 1925–1927
- Preceded by: Manning Doherty
- Succeeded by: John Giles Lethbridge

Ontario MPP
- In office 1926–1928
- Preceded by: Horace Stanley Colliver
- Succeeded by: Horace Stanley Colliver
- Constituency: Prince Edward
- In office 1920–1926
- Preceded by: Albert Hellyer
- Succeeded by: Riding abolished
- Constituency: Wellington East

Personal details
- Born: December 8, 1859 Aultsville, Canada West
- Died: September 24, 1933 (aged 73) Toronto, Ontario, Canada
- Party: United Farmers of Ontario
- Spouse: Jessie Amelia Fraser
- Children: 3, including Paul Raney
- Occupation: Lawyer, judge

William Edgar Raney KC (December 8, 1859 – September 24, 1933) was a lawyer, politician and judge in Ontario, Canada, in the early twentieth century. He was known for his opposition to gambling on horse racing and the sale of alcohol.

== Early life ==
Born on December 8, 1859, on a farm near Aulstville, Canada West, to Herman and Mary Raney, Raney was descended from Huguenot, Dutch and United Empire Loyalist stock. Raney received his education in a traditional log schoolhouse near his home. He was briefly a teacher at the St. Catharines Collegiate Institute, and then worked for two years as a journalist in the State of Maine (US) and Kingston, ON. Raney then made a career move, applied to and attended Osgoode Hall and Trinity College - graduating with high honours and a gold medal in law. Raney earned his King's Counsel (KC) title in 1906.

Raney was a well-known lawyer in the early 1900s and initially came to the public eye through his opposition to gambling on horse racing, against which he authored a series of reports.

His son, Paul Hartley Raney, a fighter pilot in the First World War, was killed in action, shot down over Roulers, Belgium (then German-held territory) on August 21, 1917. After the War, Raney made a number of appeals to the War Graves Commission to locate his son's final resting place. Unfortunately, no grave could be located.

== Political career ==
=== Ontario Attorney General ===
Raney was initially a Liberal running unsuccessfully for the Ontario legislature in the 1914 provincial election. After the United Farmers of Ontario unexpectedly won the 1919 provincial election the agrarian party — pursuing an unusual matter of principle — had no lawyers in its caucus and so the new government of E.C. Drury approached Raney to accept the position of Attorney-General. He accepted and contested a by-election entering the Legislative Assembly of Ontario as the Member of the Legislative Assembly (MLA) for Wellington East. He was sworn in as the Attorney General of Ontario on November 14, 1919.

He became a leading force in the UFO-Labour government. In his ministerial capacity, he set out to abolish party patronage methods in the Ontario Ministry of Justice (which included lists of preferred firms used for government legal work and advertising), and had the administration of the Ontario Temperance Act transferred to his office. Indeed, he became best known for what has been described as his tireless, 'zealous' enforcement of Ontario's prohibition laws, which brought him a public perception of being a severe, uncompromising character. As in illustration of this, when police and liquor officials were authorized to search automobiles and private yachts for illegal liquor, The Toronto Telegram observed that the only means of transportation where citizens could be free from Raney's agents were "balloons and submarines."

However, one of Attorney General Raney's alcohol inspectors, the Reverend Leslie Spracklin, was tried for manslaughter (days after the pastor's wife was in dangerous proximity to a shooting incident, Spracklin shot and killed a man who was engaged in the illicit liquor trade and was later acquitted of manslaughter). The Government's and Raney's administration of the Province's liquor laws thus came under significant scrutiny. The Government's strict enforcement of the Ontario Temperance Act served to alienate voters from the cities, who largely felt that the party was too inclined towards rural causes and hostile towards urban issues.

=== Cabinet posts ===
Drury ministry, Province of Ontario (1919–1923)
Cabinet post (1)
Predecessor	Office	Successor
Isaac Benson Lucas	Attorney General; 1919-1923	William Folger Nickle

=== Leader of Progressive Party ===
The return of only 17 UFO and 4 Labour MLAs in the provincial election of 1923 saw Premier Drury lose his own seat along with his government. The Progressives (as the UFO bloc of MLAs had become known) unanimously elected Raney as their leader at a caucus meeting January 20, 1925, following the retirement of acting leader Manning Doherty. Despite the unanimous vote, two UFO MPPs, Leslie Oke and Beniah Bowman refused to accept Raney as leader as he was not a farmer and refused to join the Progressives; instead they continued to sit as UFO MPPs.

Raney led the opposition against the Ferguson government's plan to replace the Ontario Temperance Act with a Liquor Control Act which allowed alcohol sales through a government-run Liquor Control Board. It was on this issue that he clashed with Ferguson and campaigned unsuccessfully against the loosening of Ontario's liquor laws as Progressive leader in the 1926 election, which returned only 17 Progressive, UFO or Labour MLAs.

== Judicial appointment and final years ==
In 1927, Raney resigned his seat to accept an appointment to the Supreme Court of Ontario, where he served diligently with significant respect and distinction. Raney held the post of Judge on the Court until his death in 1933. A heart attack in May of that year left him reduced in strength, though he continued some judicial duties while regaining his health. In late September, there was a rapid two-day decline ending in heart failure, at 74 years of age.

== See also ==
- Leslie Spracklin#Dubious supporters
