= John Aaron Weese =

Canadian politician

Member of Parliament for Prince Edward—Lennox
- In office July 1930 – August 1935
- Preceded by: John Hubbs
- Succeeded by: George Tustin

Personal details
- Born: John Aaron Weese; 6 March 1891 Ameliasburgh, Ontario, Canada
- Died: 12 July 1981 (aged 90) Belleville, Ontario, Canada
- Party: Conservative
- Spouse(s): Luella Latimer m. 25 December 1912
- Profession: farmer

John Aaron Weese (6 March 1891 – 12 July 1981) was a Conservative member of the House of Commons of Canada. He was born in Ameliasburgh, Ontario and became a farmer.

Weese attended school at Rossmore, Ontario. From 1923 to 1926, Weese was reeve of Ameliasburgh Township, Ontario, and served as a Prince Edward County warden in 1926.

He was first elected to Parliament at the Prince Edward—Lennox riding in the 1930 general election and served only one term, the 17th Canadian Parliament. Weese left federal politics and did not seek re-election in the 1935 federal election. He died 12 July 1981 in Belleville, Ontario.
