= Prince Edward (federal electoral district) =

Former federal electoral district in Ontario, Canada

Ontario electoral district

Defunct federal electoral district
- Legislature: House of Commons
- District created: 1867
- District abolished: 1924
- First contested: 1867
- Last contested: 1921

Prince Edward was a federal electoral district in Ontario, Canada, that was represented in the House of Commons of Canada from 1867 to 1904. It was created by the British North America Act 1867, and consisted of the County of Prince Edward.

The electoral district was abolished in 1924 when it was merged into Prince Edward—Lennox riding.

== Members of Parliament ==
This riding has elected the following members of Parliament:

Parliament	Years	Member	Party
1st	1867–1872	Walter Ross	Liberal
2nd	1872–1874	Walter Ross	Liberal
3rd	1874–1878	Walter Ross	Liberal
4th	1878–1882	James Simeon McCuaig	Conservative
5th	1882–1887	John Milton Platt	Liberal
6th	1887–1888	John Milton Platt	Liberal
6th	1888–1891	John Milton Platt	Liberal
7th	1891–1892	Archibald Campbell Miller	Conservative
7th	1892–1896	Archibald Campbell Miller	Conservative
8th	1896–1900	William Varney Pettet	Patrons of Industry
9th	1900–1904	George Oscar Alcorn	Conservative
10th	1904–1908	George Oscar Alcorn	Conservative
11th	1908–1911	Morley Currie	Liberal
12th	1911–1917	Bernard Rickart Hepburn	Conservative
13th	1917–1921	Bernard Rickart Hepburn	Government (Unionist)
14th	1921–1925	John Hubbs	Conservative
Riding dissolved into Prince Edward—Lennox

== Election history ==
1867 Canadian federal election
Party	Candidate	Votes
Liberal	Walter Ross	1,779
Conservative	James McCuaig	942
Source: Canadian Elections Database

1872 Canadian federal election
Party	Candidate	Votes
Liberal	Walter Ross	1,759
Conservative	James Simeon McCuaig	1,625
Source: Canadian Elections Database

1874 Canadian federal election
Party	Candidate	Votes
Liberal	Walter Ross	1,775
Conservative	James Simeon McCuaig	1,649

1878 Canadian federal election
Party	Candidate	Votes
Conservative	James Simeon McCuaig	1,991
Liberal	John M. Platt	1,701

1882 Canadian federal election
Party	Candidate	Votes
Liberal	John M. Platt	1,944
Conservative	James Simeon McCuaig	1,925

1887 Canadian federal election
Party	Candidate	Votes
Liberal	John M. Platt	2,222
Unknown	Robert Clapp	2,151

By-election: On election being declared void:

By-election: 19 March 1988
Party	Candidate	Votes
Liberal	John M. Platt	2,198
Unknown	Robert Clapp	1,971

1891 Canadian federal election
Party	Candidate	Votes
Conservative	Archibald Campbell Miller	2,264
Liberal	John M. Platt	2,225

By-election: On election being declared void:

By-election: 4 February 1892
Party	Candidate	Votes
Conservative	Archibald Campbell Miller	acclaimed

1896 Canadian federal election
Party	Candidate	Votes
Patrons of Industry	Wm. Varney Pettet	2,188
Conservative	W. Boulter	1,967

1900 Canadian federal election
Party	Candidate	Votes
Conservative	George Oscar Alcorn	2,148
Liberal	William V. Pettet	2,080

1904 Canadian federal election
Party	Candidate	Votes
Conservative	George Oscar Alcorn	2,253
Liberal	? Rose	2,107

1908 Canadian federal election
Party	Candidate	Votes
Liberal	Morley Currie	2,341
Conservative	George Oscar Alcorn	2,204

1911 Canadian federal election
Party	Candidate	Votes
Conservative	Bernard Rickart Hepburn	2,304
Liberal	Morley Currie	2,024

1917 Canadian federal election
Party	Candidate	Votes
Government	William Bernard Rickart Hepburn	3,231
Opposition	Herbert Horsey	1,755

1921 Canadian federal election
Party	Candidate	Votes
Conservative	John Hubbs	3,839
Progressive	James Redner Anderson	2,730
Liberal	Herbert Horsey	2,357

== See also ==
- List of Canadian electoral districts
- Historical federal electoral districts of Canada
