= Leslie Spracklin =

John Oswald Leslie Spracklin (called Leslie; December 4, 1886 – May 1960) a Methodist minister from Windsor, Ontario, Canada, noted for his involvement with Prohibition issues. Spracklin shot and killed a man who was engaged in the illicit liquor trade and was later acquitted of manslaughter, after which experience he decided to emigrate to the United States.

== Background ==
In 1918, Spracklin took up the pastoral charge of Sandwich Methodist Church, Windsor. He was noted for the eloquence of his rhetorical style.

Spracklin's ministry occurred during a period when Prohibition — which was especially promoted by the United Farmers of Ontario' Provincial Government — was regarded as a pressing issue by Spracklin and many of his parishioners and supporters.

=== Dubious supporters ===
These supporters included the brothers W. H. and S. M. Hallam, who, in the Windsor area, were known less for their religious observance than for their muscular activities in support of questionable causes. The Hallams thus joined Spracklin in Ontario Attorney-General William Raney's Prohibition enforcement team, as part of the Attorney-General's policy of bypassing the regular police forces in favour of using sub-contracted, private groups of enforcers.

This varied component recruited by Spracklin was subsequently to cause William Raney considerable embarrassment.

==== Geographical context of the Detroit River to Spracklin's ministry ====
The proximity of the United States' border to the Sandwich suburb of Windsor, Ontario, where Spracklin fulfilled his ministry, and the huge cross-border trade - legal and illicit - gave heightened focus to the concerns and activities of Spracklin and his zealous followers. This proximity undoubtedly bore relevance also to Spracklin's eventual emigration.

== Prohibition controversies and events of 1920 ==
On August 26, 1920, the cruiser Eugenia, was stopped in the Detroit River after the speedboat Panther II, with Spracklin and his associate W. H. Hallam on board, fired on the cruiser; nine men were arrested and accused of attempting to smuggle whiskey into the US.

It was reported also on August 27, 1920, that Spracklin had accused the mayor of Amherstburg, W. Fred Park, of harbouring large quantities of alcohol; Mayor Park was subsequently fined $1000.00.

=== Ministerial benevolence doubted ===
It was claimed that the pastor was not distinguishing between his spiritual and alcohol inspection duties.

Complaints abounded. To skeptics, his enforcers seemed not to act with adequate restraint or oversight. A Windsor, Ontario lawyer claimed that Spracklin's men, allegedly exceeding their proper duty, would arbitrarily fill in blank search warrants at will.

==== Distrusts among even his own parishioners ====
It was also claimed that Spracklin showed excessive zeal, and that this demonstration of zeal extended to his treatment of his own parishioners. The attention of these Spracklin would engage while preaching in the interior of Sandwich Methodist Church; meanwhile, in the parking area outside the building, his uninhibited enforcement associates would surreptitiously search his parishioners' cars at random.

=== Pastor's wife escapes spray of bullets ===
On Halloween night, 1920, Spracklin's wife Myrle Welsh narrowly escaped death when the Spracklins' manse was sprayed with bullets from an unproven source. At the time it was assumed that this violent incident was perpetrated on the behalf of persons in the illicit liquor trade disadvantaged by Spracklin and his men; this assumption was never seriously questioned. It subsequently proved to be pivotal but somewhat obscure to establish whether this traumatic event led to later actions on the part of her husband.

=== Manslaughter charge and trial ===
On November 6, 1920, Spracklin, as part of Ontario Attorney-General Raney's Prohibition enforcement team, shot and killed Beverly Trumble, proprietor of the Chappell House hotel, who was engaged in illicit trade in liquor, and in whose hand Spracklin later claimed to have seen a gun. However, any direct linkage between the occurrence of this violent death only a few days after Myrle's alarming experience on Halloween Night remained unclear.

==== Acquittal ====
At his subsequent trial, Spracklin was acquitted of manslaughter.

The transparency of the process by which Spracklin's acquittal emerged was evidently called into question by some, since this verdict was met with considerable surprise in some quarters.

===== Widespread comment evoked by Spracklin's fate =====
Much discussion and comment ensued following Spracklin's trial and acquittal. The fact that historical records of Spracklin's actions on November 6, 1920, differ in emphasis underlines the controversy which arose from the series of events leading to his acquittal.

===== Varying opinions asserted =====
The tenor of one historical account is suggestive that Spracklin should have been charged with murder rather than of the manslaughter of which he was eventually acquitted.

Other descriptions seek to stress that the evidence should be interpreted as indicating that Spracklin acted in self-defence.

== Later life ==
A more distant relationship between Spracklin and the Hallams emerged.

In 1921 Spracklin relinquished his pastoral charge at Sandwich Methodist Church. Spracklin's resignation appears to have occurred without another parish charge having been made available to him, and with the events surrounding his manslaughter charge and acquittal very much in memory.

Following Spracklin's resignation, the nature of his pastoral work underwent changes.

=== Development of itinerant ministry and emigration ===
The ministerial vocation of Spracklin thus evidenced significant development in its emphasis into itinerant activities in place of localized, parish ministry.

Spracklin later emigrated to the United States, and there he continued with his personal mission of campaigning for the anti-liquor cause.

=== Promotion of Anti-Saloon League in the US ===
In the US, Spracklin's ministry involved significant travel. His efforts were considerably directed towards the promotion of the Anti-Saloon League.

Spracklin thus itinerated as a visiting speaker to local churches on the League's behalf.

== Legacy ==
By general consent, the conjunction of events around the Canadian period of Spracklin's ministry related to the particularly excessive zeal of the Prohibition era in Ontario, when the ideas and aims of the soon to be eclipsed United Farmers of Ontario were prominent.

Spracklin's vigorously vocal ministry at least superficially resembles that of J. Frank Norris, of Fort Worth, Tx, who also maintained an itinerant pastoral charge in Detroit, Michigan. Like Spracklin, Norris also widely employed his considerable, rhetorical gifts in anti-liquor campaigning in opposition to local civic leaders and was himself acquitted of murdering an associate of the local mayor in 1926 on grounds of self-defence, which were later widely challenged. Norris, whose vigorous political views exercised a deep influence upon his seminary student John Birch and others, later undertook a wide, public ministry; however, the reputation of Spracklin never eclipsed the events of 1920.

== See also ==
- Ernest Charles Drury
- Neighbourhoods of Windsor, Ontario#Sandwich
- William Raney
