= Prince Edward—Lennox (federal electoral district) =

Former federal electoral district in Ontario, Canada

Ontario electoral district

Defunct federal electoral district
- Legislature: House of Commons
- District created: 1924
- District abolished: 1966
- First contested: 1925
- Last contested: 1965

Prince Edward—Lennox was a federal electoral district represented in the House of Commons of Canada from 1925 to 1968. It was located in the province of Ontario. This riding was created in 1924 from Prince Edward riding and parts of Lennox and Addington riding.

It initially consisted of the county of Prince Edward and the townships of Adolphustown, Amherst Island, Fredericksburg (North and South) and Richmond in the county of Lennox and Addington.

In 1933, the township of Ernestown in the county of Lennox and Addington was added to the riding.

The electoral district was abolished in 1966 when it was redistributed between Prince Edward—Hastings, Kingston and the Islands and Frontenac—Lennox and Addington ridings.

== Members of Parliament ==
This riding elected the following members of the House of Commons of Canada:

Parliament	Years	Member	Party
Riding created from Prince Edward and Lennox and Addington
15th	1925–1926	John Hubbs	Conservative
16th	1926–1930	John Hubbs	Conservative
17th	1930–1935	John Aaron Weese	Conservative
18th	1935–1940	George Tustin	Conservative
19th	1940–1945	George Tustin	National Government
20th	1945–1949	George Tustin	Progressive Conservative
21st	1949–1953	George Tustin	Progressive Conservative
22nd	1953–1957	George Tustin	Progressive Conservative
23rd	1957–1958	Clarence Milligan	Progressive Conservative
24th	1958–1962	Clarence Milligan	Progressive Conservative
25th	1962–1963	Douglas Alkenbrack	Progressive Conservative
26th	1963–1965	Douglas Alkenbrack	Progressive Conservative
27th	1965–1968	Douglas Alkenbrack	Progressive Conservative
Riding dissolved into Prince Edward—Hastings, Kingston and the Islands and Frontenac—Lennox and Addington

== Election results ==
1925 Canadian federal election: Prince Edward—Lennox
Party	Candidate	Votes
Conservative	John Hubbs	6,435
Progressive	Edward James Sexsmith	5,701

1926 Canadian federal election: Prince Edward—Lennox
Party	Candidate	Votes
Conservative	John Hubbs	7,139
Liberal	Henry Herbert Horsey	6,199

1930 Canadian federal election: Prince Edward—Lennox
Party	Candidate	Votes
Conservative	John Aaron Weese	6,923
Liberal	William Henry Benson	5,447

1935 Canadian federal election: Prince Edward—Lennox
Party	Candidate	Votes
Conservative	George Tustin	7,411
Liberal	James Warren Clark	6,771
Reconstruction	Garnet Stickney Tayler	829

1940 Canadian federal election: Prince Edward—Lennox
Party	Candidate	Votes
National Government	George Tustin	6,574
Liberal	Howard Weese	5,906

1945 Canadian federal election: Prince Edward—Lennox
Party	Candidate	Votes
Progressive Conservative	George Tustin	7,907
Liberal	Gordon L. Bell	5,121
Co-operative Commonwealth	Donald Wesley East	517

1949 Canadian federal election: Prince Edward—Lennox
Party	Candidate	Votes
Progressive Conservative	George Tustin	7,435
Liberal	Gordon Bell	5,965
Co-operative Commonwealth	Colin Carter	866

1953 Canadian federal election: Prince Edward—Lennox
Party	Candidate	Votes
Progressive Conservative	George Tustin	6,726
Independent	David Donald Thompson	5,801

1957 Canadian federal election: Prince Edward—Lennox
Party	Candidate	Votes
Progressive Conservative	Clarence Milligan	9,003
Liberal	Clinton Green	5,901

1958 Canadian federal election: Prince Edward—Lennox
Party	Candidate	Votes
Progressive Conservative	Clarence Milligan	10,783
Liberal	Fred Norman	4,458

1962 Canadian federal election: Prince Edward—Lennox
Party	Candidate	Votes
Progressive Conservative	Douglas Alkenbrack	9,094
Liberal	Lloyd Woolsey	7,128
New Democratic	Howard Weese	922
Social Credit	Wilbur N. Crandall	142

1963 Canadian federal election: Prince Edward—Lennox
Party	Candidate	Votes
Progressive Conservative	Douglas Alkenbrack	8,869
Liberal	Lloyd Douglas Woolsey	7,515
New Democratic	Howard Weese	863
Social Credit	Lawrence R. O'Marra	117

1965 Canadian federal election: Prince Edward—Lennox
Party	Candidate	Votes
Progressive Conservative	Douglas Alkenbrack	9,064
Liberal	Lloyd D. Woolsey	6,311
New Democratic	Jack Owen	1,043

== See also ==
- List of Canadian electoral districts
- Historical federal electoral districts of Canada
