= John Allison Sprague =

Canadian politician

Ontario MPP
- In office 1886–1894
- Preceded by: James Hart
- Succeeded by: John Caven
- Constituency: Prince Edward

Personal details
- Born: April 10, 1844 Sophiasburgh Township, Canada West
- Died: September 14, 1907 (aged 63) Picton, Ontario
- Party: Liberal
- Spouse: Ellen A. Badgley (m. 1864)
- Occupation: Farmer

John Allison Sprague (April 10, 1844 – September 14, 1907) was an Ontario farmer and political figure. He represented Prince Edward in the Legislative Assembly of Ontario from 1886 to 1894 as a Liberal member.

== Biography ==
He was born in Sophiasburgh Township, Canada West in 1844, the son of Hallett Sprague and Mary Allison, and grew up there. In 1864, he married Ellen A. Badgley. He was a justice of the peace and served fifteen years on the township council, also serving as reeve. Sprague was a captain in the local militia. He lived near Demorestville.

With his son Grant, he established a rural telephone company serving Prince Edward County in 1898. He died suddenly in 1907.
