= Archibald Campbell Miller =

Canadian politician

Archibald Campbell Miller (April 29, 1836 – November 17, 1898) was a farmer and political figure in Ontario, Canada. He represented Prince Edward in the House of Commons of Canada from 1891 to 1896 as a Conservative member.

He was born in Athol Township, Upper Canada, the son of Johnathan Miller and Parnell Leet, and was educated in Prince Edward County. In 1863, he married Ellen Rowland. His election in 1891 was declared void but Miller won the by-election that followed in 1892. He did not run for reelection in 1896. Miller operated a canning factory near Brighton. The brand name was Little Chief; a 500-pound metal statue of the firm's trademark went to war with the Prince Edward Regiment as a mascot during World War II.

Miller died in Hallowell, Ontario at the age of 62.

== Electoral record ==
1891 Canadian federal election: Prince Edward
| Party | Candidate | Votes |
|---|---|---|
| Conservative | Archibald Campbell Miller | 2,264 |
| Liberal | John M. Platt | 2,225 |

By-election: On election being declared void:

By-election: 4 February 1892
| Party | Candidate | Votes |
|---|---|---|
| Conservative | Archibald Campbell MILLER | acclaimed |
