= CJPE-FM =

Community radio station in Picton, Ontario

Coordinates: 44.00075°N 77.15718°W

CJPE-FM, branded as 99.3 County FM, is an English-language community radio station which broadcasts at 99.3 MHz in Picton, Ontario, Canada. The station is owned and operated by the Prince Edward County Radio Corporation, and was approved to broadcast by the CRTC on January 21, 2014.

CJPE-FM broadcasts with an average effective radiated power (ERP) of 1,688 watts (maximum ERP of 3,000 watts with an effective height of antenna above average terrain of 71 metres).

The station was officially launched on October 15, 2014. Sometime in late 2014, the tourist information radio station CIQW-FM in nearby Quinte West was shut down due to interference from the new CJPE-FM which also operates on 99.3 FM. Instant Information Services (CIQW-FM) plans to apply for a new frequency.
