= Paul Hartley Raney =

Canadian fighter pilot (1892–1917)

- Paul H. Raney, c.1914
- Born: 25 December 1892; Toronto, Ontario, Canada
- Died: 21 August 1917 (aged 24); Roeselare, Belgium
- Burial place: Arras Flying Services Memorial, Pas de Calais, France
- Relatives: Father: Hon. William Edgar Raney, KC; Mother: Jessie Amelia Raney (née Fraser)
- Military career
- Allegiance: United Kingdom
- Branch: Royal Flying Corps
- Service years: 1916–1917
- Rank: Second Lieutenant
- Unit: No. 66 Squadron RFC
- Conflicts: World War I • Western Front

Second Lieutenant Paul Hartley Raney (25 December 1892 – 21 August 1917) was a Canadian fighter pilot in the First World War. Born in Toronto, he attended West Toronto Public School, St. Andrew's College from 1906 to 1908, and Oakwood Collegiate. He studied Applied Science from 1910 onwards, graduating with a degree in Civil Engineering at the University of Toronto in 1914. Raney enlisted in the Royal Flying Corps to fight in the First World War, training to become a fighter pilot. After a very short tour of duty, he was shot down and killed in action on 21 August 1917.

== Royal Flying Corps Service ==
In December 1916, at the age of 23, Paul Raney enlisted in the Royal Flying Corps. After training for a few months at Camp Borden, Ontario, he was selected as a "Cadet for Further Instruction in Aviation," and crossed the Atlantic to England aboard the S.S. Megnatic in May 1917. Raney attended final flight and combat training in England, earning his wings in mid-June. In early July, Raney arrived in France, at the reserve camp, or as it was called the "Pool Pilots Mess", which was where new recruits were stationed before "an opening" appeared at active Squadrons. On 8 August, Raney was posted to 66 Squadron of the Royal Flying Corps, then operating at Estreé Blanche in the Ypres area. 66 Squadron shared their aerodrome with 56 Squadron, as well as a few other British fighter squadrons of various types. After arrival on 12 August 1917, Raney began active duty.

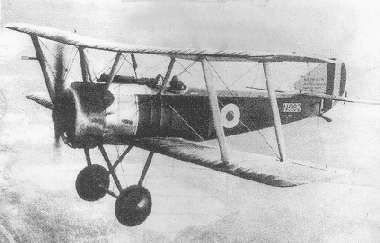
A Sopwith Pup

At the time, 66 Squadron was equipped with the stable, easy to fly, yet underpowered Sopwith Pup. This aircraft, though an excellent trainer, was relatively outclassed by the mainstream German opponents that were then in the air. In June–August 1917, the Albatros D.III and Albatros D.V were the main fighters of the German airforce. Although nimble and maneuverable, the Pup was nowhere near as fast or powerful as its opponents, and could not hope to outpace or outclimb them. As well, the Pup was equipped with one synchronized Vickers machine gun, while the German planes featured two or more synchronized Spandau machine guns. Although other British Squadrons were equipped with the better fighters that were available, 66 Squadron would have to make do with its Pups until later in the year when they would be outfitted with the much more deadly Sopwith Camels.

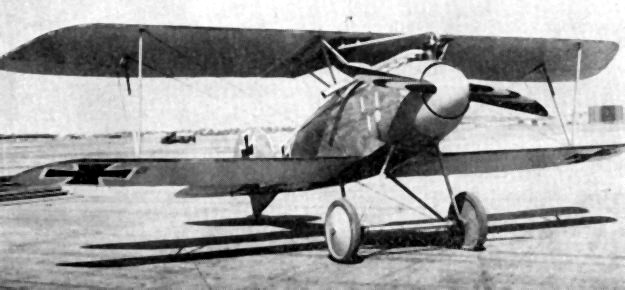
A Albatross D.III

Raney's short tour of duty, commencing on 12 August 1917, consisted of unrelenting patrols over enemy territory. Most pilots flew one or more per day, early morning, afternoon or evening, at about one to two and hours a piece. Wings of two to ten fighters would take off, cross over to enemy territory, and carry out the Allied mandate of air superiority by "keeping the Germans on the defensive".

After arrival, Raney was delighted to be sharing his squadron with his good friend from training in Canada, and whom had been with him aboard the Megnatic in their journey across the Atlantic, 2nd Lieutenant Patrick A. O'Brien. They shared their first practice formation flight on 12 August. At dawn the next day (13 August) both of them flew in formation for their first practice flight over enemy lines, arriving back at the aerodrome around 8:40AM. As O'Brien noted, he was "taken over the lines to get a look at things". O'Brien would later fly his first combat patrol over enemy territory the same day, while Raney had aerial fighting practice.

On 16 August, Raney had his first offensive patrol. The next day (17 August) after Raney's second patrol, Patrick O'Brien did not return from his evening patrol over German lines, and was declared missing (O'Brien, after shooting down a D type Albatross scout, sustained a gunshot wound to his neck, subsequently losing consciousness. His plane spun down out of control, crashed, and O'Brien was pulled from the wreckage alive, becoming a prisoner of war that evening, and taken to a prisoner's hospital). As O'Brien was Raney's best friend in France, he was quite troubled by the event. After no word on O'Brien for three days, Raney signed for Pat's personnel belongings and sent them back to Cox & Co, the airforce (RFC) Bankers in England.

== Death ==
Article on Raney when word reached Canada he had gone missing

On 21 August 1917, after a total of six patrols and at the age of 24, Raney took off at approximately 5:30pm with five other pilots in an evening patrol over enemy territory. This mission marked the first time Raney had flown in a different Sopwith Pup than he had flown to date (serial number B2177.3 instead of B1846).

The only detailed information of Raney's last moments likely comes from O'Brien himself, as he witnessed and later wrote in his intriguing novel about his entire wartime experiences: being shot down, captured, and escaping Germany and Belgium into the Netherlands.

From Outwitting The Hun (1918), by Pat O'Brien (Harper & Brothers Publishers: New York, London)

"From my hospital bed as prisoner in Germany, I was musing over the melancholy phase of the scout's life when an orderly told me there was a beautiful battle going on in the air, and he volunteered to help me outside the hospital that I might witness it, and I readily accepted his assistance. That afternoon I saw one of the gamest flights I ever expect to witness.

There were six of our machines against perhaps sixteen Huns. From the type of the British machines, I knew that they might possibly be from my own aerodrome. Two of our machines had been apparently picked out by six of the Huns and were bearing the brunt of the fight. The contest seemed to me to be so unequal that victory for our men was hardly to be thought of, and yet at one time they so completely outmaneuvered the Huns that I thought their superior skill might save the day for them, despite the fact that they were so hopelessly outnumbered. One thing I was sure of; they would never give in.

Of course it would have been a comparatively simple matter for our men, when they saw how things were going against them, to have turned their noses down, landed behind the German lines, and given themselves up as prisoner, but that is not the way of the R.F.C. A battle of this kind seldom lasts many minutes, although every second seems like an hour to those who participate in it and even onlookers suffer more thrills in the course of the struggle than they would ordinarily experience in a lifetime. It is apparent even to a novice that the loser's fate is death.

Of course the Germans around the hospital were all watching and rooting for their comrades, but the English, too, had one sympathizer in that group who made no effort to stifle his admiration for the bravery his comrades were displaying. The end came suddenly. Four machines crashed to earth almost simultaneously. It was an even break--two of theirs and two of ours. The others apparently returned to their respective lines.

The wound in my mouth was bothering me considerably, but by means of a pencil and paper I requested one of the German officers to find out for me who the English officers were who had been shot down. - A little later he returned and handed me a photograph taken from the body of one of the victims. It was a picture of Paul Raney, of Toronto, and myself, taken together! Poor Raney! He was the best friend I had and one of the best and gamest men who ever fought in France!"

The photograph that Paul H. Raney was carrying upon his death. O'Brien (left) and Raney (right)

The above story is a somewhat dressed-up version of a statement O'Brien made upon his eventual return to England. According to it, he first observed a smaller combat between a small number of British Sopwith Triplanes and about twice as many German Albatrosses; soon after which a flight of British Pups arrived and joined the fray. O'Brien noted that this turned the fight immediately in British favour; however very soon after the Pups arrived, a flight of at least ten more Albatrosses appeared from the clouds and promptly engaged. The fight then turned deadly for both sides: Raney and a 2nd Lt. William Reginald Keast from 66 Squadron were both subsequently shot down, and at least one German plane was forced down.

A photo of Raney and O'Brien was found on Raney's body, and given to O'Brien by the Germans. When Raney did not return from his patrol, a letter was dispatched two days later to his family in Canada, stating that he had gone missing. A very short note was later dropped over the British lines by the Germans, addressed from Patrick O'Brien to his commanding officer, stating simply "Paul Raney killed." This information was taken as official soon after O'Brien escaped from Courtnai prison in Belgium, and returned to Canada. O'Brien visited Raney's parents in Toronto to inform them of what he knew, and to bring them a map of his grave. He preserved this map through a difficult escape which included swimming through canals. This map is no longer extant. Regardless of its ultimate fate, ground fighting (and shelling) over the same territory (near Roeselare, Belgium) in 1918 would have rendered nearly any map or grave marker largely useless. Subsequent attempts by the War Graves Commission (after repeated appeals by his father to them) failed to locate any trace of Raney's remains or final resting place, which remains unknown.

It is most likely that Raney went down as the result of gunnery by a Lt. Rudolf Francke of Jasta (Squadron) 8. Raney's entry from compiled British loss records reads:

B2177.3 Sopwith Pup 66 Sqn

- Offensive Patrol – last seen diving on an Enemy Aircraft NW-Roulers; MIA (2Lt PH Raney KIA)

The same record inappropriately attributes the claim to a Lt. Erich Weiss from Jasta (Squadron) 28, who shot down a Sopwith-style aircraft in the morning of 21 August 1917 in an area far south of Raney's last known position. Two Pups were lost in the general vicinity of West Roeselare in the evening, and there are two German claims that meet that criteria: Lt. Rudolf Francke of Jasta 8 claimed a Sopwith Pup at approximately 8:15pm (German time; 7:15pm British time) from "NW Passchendaele" (corresponding to West from Roeselare), and Lt. Rudolf Wendelmuth, also from Jasta 8, claimed an S.E.5 shot down slightly south of that vicinity ("W Passchendaele", corresponding to W/SW from Roeselare), again near 8:15pm (German time). However, British records do not support Wendelmuth's claim (no S.E.5's were lost on that day in that area), and so it is likely that Wendelmuth did not take time to identify the make of his target during his (possibly short) engagement. Accordingly, owing to the close geographic and temporal proximity of the two Pup losses, it is highly probable that these two German pilots shot down Raney and Keast (Raney's squadron-mate). Based on the relative last known locations of both Raney and Keast, it is likely that Francke shot down Raney, and Wendelmuth shot down Keast, both at approximately 7:15pm British time. This conclusion makes sense given that the remnants of Raney's flight arrived back at their aerodrome at roughly 8:00pm.

2nd Lieutenant Paul Hartley Raney is remembered at the Arras Memorial in the Faubourg-d'Amiens Cemetery, France. The Flying Services Memorial commemorates over 1,000 men of the Royal Naval Air Service, the Royal Flying Corps and the Royal Air Force, who have no known grave. His family later commemorated his death with a large family gravestone erected after the passing of his father.
