= Picton Terminals =

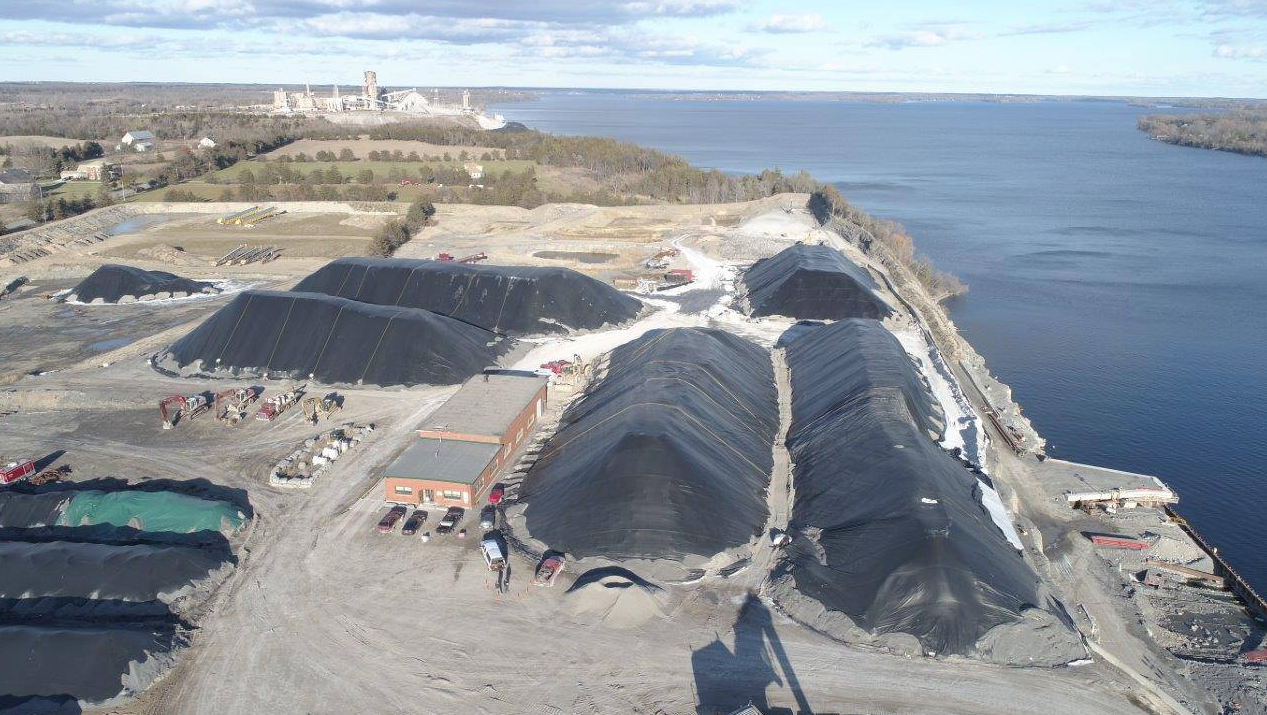
- Tarped piles of road salt stored at Picton Terminals, 2017
- Interactive map of Picton Terminals

Location
- Country: Canada
- Location: Picton, Ontario
- Coordinates: 44.034°N 77.137°W

Details
- Opened: 2014
- Operated by: ABNA Investments Ltd.
- Size: 28 ha (69 acres)
- No. of berths: 1
- Draft depth: 9.44 metres (31.0 ft)
- CEO: Ben Doornkamp
- Warehouse space: 0 square metres (0 ft^{2})

Statistics
- Vessel arrivals: unknown
- Annual cargo tonnage: unknown
- Annual revenue: unknown
- Net income: unknown
- Main imports: road salt, aggregate, farming products, new and recycled scrap steel.
- Website www.pictonterminals.ca

Picton Terminals is an inland port in Lake Ontario, on the north shore of Hallowell Mills Cove, in the town of Picton, Ontario, Canada.

== History ==
The port was built in the 1950s by Bethlehem Steel to facilitate the transhipment of iron ore mined in Marmora and conveyed to Picton via rail and, after the Marmoraton mine shut down in 1978, activity at the port diminished drastically with annual loads of sodium chloride delivered by ship occurring most falls from the 1980s until 2019. An additional terminal for agriculture is planned for 2026.

== Facilities ==
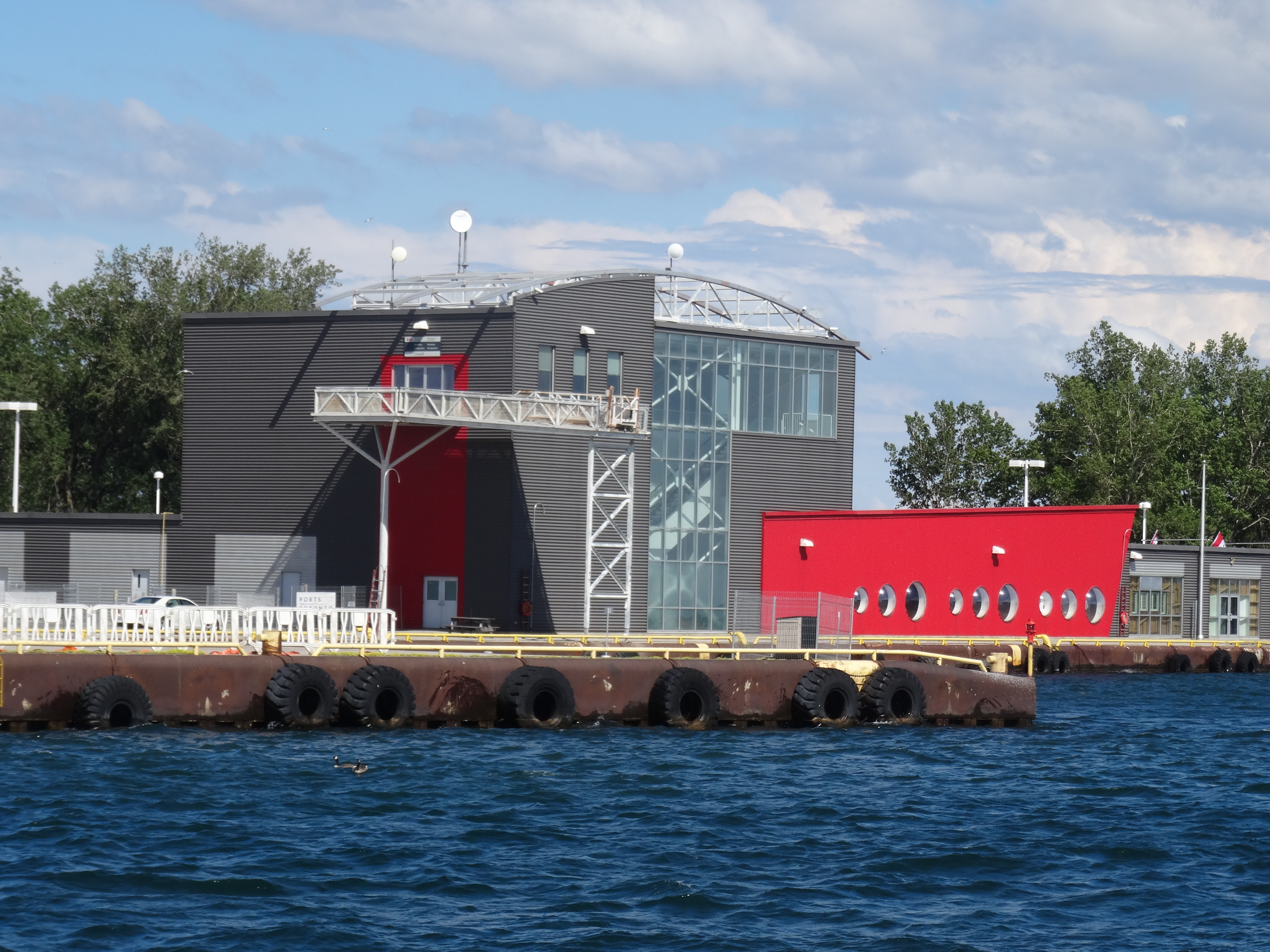
The International Marine Passenger Terminal at the Port of Toronto.

The port is made up of several port facilities, including Marine Terminal 51, Warehouse 52, and the International Marine Passenger Terminal. There are 3 miles (4.8 km) of deep-water wharfage for the loading and unloading of bulk products. Marine terminals include inside and outside storage, and some 6,000 square feet (560 m^{2}) of berthing space for ships carrying general cargo.

== Services ==
=== Cargo ===
The tonnage of cargo passing through the port is made up mostly of aggregate materials, chiefly road salt, but also farming products, new and recycled scrap steel. In 2020, Picton Terminals applied for permits to engage in transshipment, including sea container shipping.

=== Passenger ===
In 2020, Picton Terminals applied to the Municipality to add cruise ship docking to their services, in order to allow Great Lakes cruise ships to dock.

== Controversies ==
In 2018, Picton Terminals pled guilty and was subsequently fined $27,500 for contravening the Environmental Protection Act in Picton's provincial offences court. The plea resulted from a 2016 discharge of petroleum coke (petcoke) which Terminals was stockpiling on White Chapel Road. Petcoke dust, considered by the U.S. Environmental Protection Agency to be dangerous to heart and lung health, was found to have drifted onto several nearby residences, including a neighbouring pool. Picton Terminals undertook remediation work, site restoration and duct cleaning at a cost of $6,400.
