= Nelson Parliament =

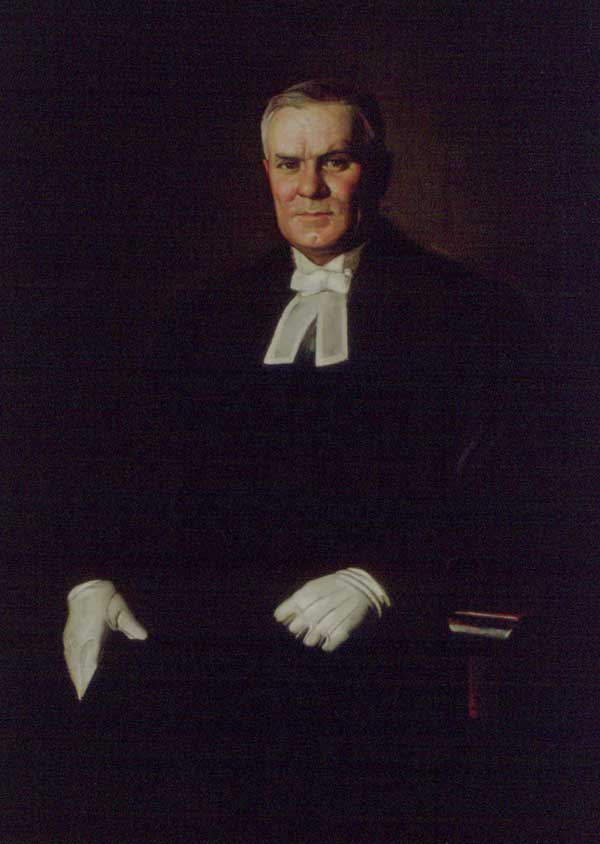

Ontario MPP
- In office 1914–1923
- Preceded by: Robert Addison Norman
- Succeeded by: Horace Stanley Colliver
- Constituency: Prince Edward

Personal details
- Born: March 11, 1877 Ameliasburgh, Ontario, Canada
- Died: May 17, 1967 (aged 90) Greencastle, Indiana, USA
- Party: Liberal
- Other political affiliations: Independent (1920-1924)
- Occupation: Farmer, businessman

Nelson Parliament (March 11, 1877 – May 17, 1967) was Speaker of the Legislature of Ontario from 1920 to 1923. He was first elected as a Liberal MLA for Prince Edward in the 1914 provincial election and served in the assembly until 1923.

Born in Ameliasburgh, Ontario. He was educated at Albert College in Belleville and went on to farm in Prince Edward County.

The United Farmers of Ontario won the 1919 general election with a caucus made up almost entirely of newcomers. Without any experienced member who could serve as Speaker, the new Premier, E.C. Drury, turned to the opposition benches and asked Parliament to take on the position. As a result, Parliament resigned from the Ontario Liberal Party and took the Speaker's chair as an independent. While it is the practice in the British House of Commons for the Speaker to resign their party affiliation, Nelson Parliament is the only Speaker in the history of the Ontario legislature to shed his party affiliation.

He was unsuccessful when he ran for reelection in 1923. Conservative candidate Horace Stanley Colliver took just 19 more votes than Parliament to win the seat.

After leaving politics, Parliament became a behind-the-scenes organizer for the Liberal Party. He later moved to Indiana, where he operated a business in partnership with his nephew.

He died in Greencastle, Indiana in 1967.
