= Bernard Rickart Hepburn =

Canadian politician

Bernard Rickart Hepburn, CMG (May 27, 1876 – February 23, 1939) was born in Picton, Ontario.

The son of A.W. Hepburn and the former Miss McCuaig, he was educated in Picton and Port Hope. In 1901, he married Bertha E. Wright. Hepburn served overseas with the Canadian Forestry Corps during World War I, reaching the rank of brigadier general. A businessman, he became a Member of the House of Commons of Canada in 1911 as a Conservative representative for Prince Edward, before representing the Unionist for the same district upon the Conservative Party's merger with segments of the Liberal Party of Canada. He remained a member of the Commons until 1921.

Hepburn was president and general manager of the Ontario and Quebec Navigation Company. He was named a Companion in the Order of St Michael and St George in 1918. He died in London, England at the age of 62.

== Electoral record ==
1911 Canadian federal election: Prince Edward
Party	Candidate	Votes
Conservative	Bernard Rickart Hepburn	2,304
Liberal	Morley Currie	2,024

1917 Canadian federal election: Prince Edward
Party	Candidate	Votes
Government	William Bernard Rickart Hepburn	3,231
Opposition	Herbert Horsey	1,755
