= William Ryerson Dempsey =

Canadian politician (1832–1914)

Ontario MPP
- In office 1898–1902
- Preceded by: John Caven
- Succeeded by: Morley Currie
- Constituency: Prince Edward

Personal details
- Born: April 2, 1832 Prince Edward County, Canada West
- Died: February 13, 1914 (aged 81) Prescott, Ontario
- Party: Conservative
- Spouse: Emily Boulter (m. 1856)
- Occupation: Farmer

William Ryerson Dempsey (October 4, 1832 – February 13, 1914) was a farmer and politician in Ontario, Canada. He represented Prince Edward in the Legislative Assembly of Ontario from 1898 to 1902 as a Conservative member.

The son of William Dempsey and Sarah Mikel, he was born in Prince Edward County, Upper Canada and was educated at the normal school in Toronto. Dempsey taught school for several years and then became a fruit grower and fruit dealer. He served as township reeve for six years and was warden for Prince Edward County, also serving as a justice of the peace. Dempsey was a Captain in the 16th Prince Edward Battalion during the Fenian raids. He married Emily Boulter.
