= Walter Ross (politician) =

Canadian politician

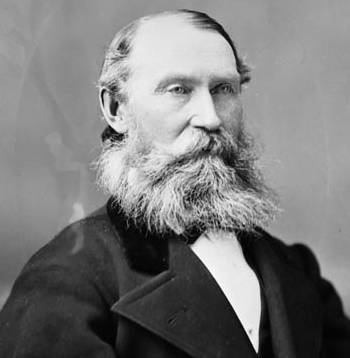
Walter Ross Source: Library and Archives Canada

Walter Ross (1817 – November 12, 1888) was a Canadian businessman and political figure who represented Prince Edward in the House of Commons of Canada as a Liberal member from 1867 to 1878.

Ross was born in Ross-shire, Scotland in 1817 and was educated in Scotland. He operated a general store in Picton and also served four years as mayor of Picton. He served as lieutenant-colonel in the local militia from 1863 to 1883. Ross owned a steamship that operated on the Great Lakes and was a director of the Prince Edward County Railway. He was elected in 1863 to the Legislative Assembly of the Province of Canada representing Prince Edward and was reelected after Canadian Confederation. Ross died in Picton at the age of 71.

His brother Lewis also served in the House of Commons.
