= John Platt =

John Platt may refer to:

- John Platt (settler) (1632–1705), early settler of Norwalk, Connecticut
- John Platt (sculptor) (1728–1810), English sculptor
- John Platt (MP) (1817–1872), English manufacturer of textile machinery and Liberal politician
- John Milton Platt (1840–1919), physician and political figure in Ontario, Canada
- John Platt (artist) (1886–1967), English artist
- John R. Platt (1918–1992), American physicist and biophysicist
- John Platt (footballer) (born 1954), English goalkeeper
- John Platt (computer scientist) (born 1963), American computer scientist
- John Talbot Platt (published from 1960s, died 1990), Australian linguist who documented the Kokatha dialect
- John P. Platt (fl. 1986–2018), American geologist and educator

== See also ==
- Jon Platt (born 1964), U.S. music executive
- Platt Brothers
- John Platts (disambiguation)
- John Platts-Mills (1906–2001), British Labour Party politician
