= Robert Addison Norman =

Canadian politician from Ontario

Member of the Ontario Provincial Parliament for Prince Edward
- In office June 8, 1908 – May 29, 1914
- Preceded by: Morley Currie
- Succeeded by: Nelson Parliament

Personal details
- Party: Conservative

Robert Addison Norman was a Canadian politician from Ontario. He represented Prince Edward in the Legislative Assembly of Ontario from 1908 to 1914.

== See also ==
- 12th Parliament of Ontario
- 13th Parliament of Ontario
