= John Platt (footballer) =

English footballer (born 1954)

Personal information
- Full name: John Platt
- Date of birth: 1954 (age 71–72)
- Place of birth: Ashton-under-Lyne
- Position: Goalkeeper

Senior career*
Years	Team	Apps	(Gls)
1971–1981	Oldham Athletic	109	(0)
1981–1983	Bury	20	(0)
1983–1984	Bolton Wanderers	10	(0)
1984–1986	Preston North End	38	(0)
1984–1985	Tranmere Rovers	8	(0)
- * Club domestic league appearances and goals

For other people named John Platt, see John Platt.

John Platt (born 1954) is a footballer who played as a goalkeeper in the Football League.

== Oldham Athletic ==
He was first spotted by Oldham Athletic playing for his home town club Ashton United. He signed amateur forms for the Oldham club in 1971 and became a full-time professional in 1974. During his Boundary Park career, he was unlucky to be sidelined with two long spells of injury, and was also forced to compete for his place, first by Chris Ogden and then by Peter McDonnell. He first took over from Ogden for a home game against Southampton on 21 October 1975, lost his place again in November, but regained it six weeks later. Ogden came back for the last two games of a season which saw Platt play 27 league games and Ogden 15.

Platt started the next season as first choice, but then suffered a long injury spell from March 1977, which kept him out of action until October, when he came back into the team for a game at Sunderland and then retained his place for the rest of the season.

Injury kept him out for the whole of the 1978–79 season, by which time Ogden had moved on to Swindon Town and Oldham had signed McDonnell from Liverpool. McDonnell played in every game that season and started in goal for the following season, only for Platt to make a comeback in November, and go on to start another 19 games. McDonnell then became the established Number 1, and after playing a total of 109 games over a six-year period, Platt was released at the end of the season, joining Bury in August 1981.

During the latter part of his playing career he had qualified in sports management at Salford University and in September 1986 he again signed amateur forms for Oldham when he was appointed stadium manager at Boundary Park where he was in charge of community use of the new artificial pitch, and supervised the Football in the Community Scheme. He played no further games for Oldham in this period, and in August 1987, while continuing his community work at the club, he signed as a player with Stalybridge Celtic.

== Other clubs ==
After leaving Bury in 1983, he joined Bolton Wanderers, moving again in 1984 to Preston North End. During his time at Preston he also had a loan spell at Tranmere Rovers.
