= William Anderson (Ontario MPP) =

Canadian politician

Ontario MPP
- In office 1870–1871
- Preceded by: Absalom Greeley
- Succeeded by: James Simeon McCuaig
- Constituency: Prince Edward

Personal details
- Born: April 7, 1822 Ameliasburgh Township, Upper Canada
- Died: October 16, 1887 (aged 65) Peterborough, Ontario
- Party: Liberal
- Occupation: Farmer

William Anderson (April 7, 1822 – October 16, 1887) was an Ontario farmer and political figure. He represented Prince Edward in the 1st Parliament of Ontario as a Conservative member from 1870 to 1871.

He was born in Ameliasburgh Township in Upper Canada in 1822, the son of an Irish immigrant. He served in the local militia, becoming captain in 1855. Anderson was elected to the Legislative Assembly of the Province of Canada for Prince Edward in 1861; he was defeated in 1863. He was elected to the provincial legislature in an 1870 by-election after Absalom Greeley resigned his seat. He also served as the Grand Treasurer for the Orange Lodge of British North America. Anderson later served as reeve for the township and was warden for Prince Edward County in 1884.

== Electoral history ==
Ontario provincial by-election, July 1870: Prince Edward Resignation of Absalom Greeley
Party	Candidate	Votes	%	±%
Conservative	William Anderson	1,337	54.95	+13.62
Independent	S. Sprague	1,096	45.05	
Total valid votes		2,433	100.0	−11.07
Conservative gain from Liberal		Swing		+13.62
Source: History of the Electoral Districts, Legislatures and Ministries of the Province of Ontario

1871 Ontario general election: Prince Edward
Party	Candidate	Votes	%
Liberal	Gideon Striker	1,522	52.23
Conservative	William Anderson	1,392	47.77
Turnout		2,914	78.19
Eligible voters		3,727	
Election voided
Source: Elections Ontario
