= John Platts =

John Platts may refer to:

- John Platts (cricketer), English cricketer
- John Platts (Unitarian), English Unitarian minister and compiler of reference works
- John Thompson Platts, British language scholar

== See also ==
- John Platt (disambiguation)
- John Platts-Mills (1906–2001), British politician
