= Frontenac—Lennox and Addington =

Former federal electoral district in Ontario, Canada

Ontario electoral district

Defunct federal electoral district
- Legislature: House of Commons
- District created: 1966
- District abolished: 1976
- First contested: 1968
- Last contested: 1974

Frontenac—Lennox and Addington was a federal electoral district represented in the House of Commons of Canada from 1968 to 1979. It was located in the province of Ontario. This riding was created in 1966 from parts of Hastings—Frontenac, Kingston, Lanark, Prince Edward—Lennox, Renfrew North and Renfrew South ridings.

It consisted of:

- in the county of Frontenac: the Townships of Barrie, Bedford, North Canonto, South Canonto, Clarendon, Hinchinbrooke, Kennebec, Loughborough, Miller, Olden, Oso, Palmerston, Portland and Storrington, and the north east part of the Township of Pittsburgh;
- in the County of Lanark: the Townships of Bathurst, Dalhousie, Lavant, North Sherbrooke and South Sherbrooke;
- in the County of Lennox and Addington: the Townships of Abinger, Adolphustown, Anglesea, Ashby, Camden, Denbigh, Effingham, Ernestown, North Fredericksburgh, South Fredericksburgh, Kaladar, Richmond and Sheffield;
- in the County of Renfrew: the Townships of North Algona, South Algona, Brougham, Brudenell, Grattan, Griffith, Hagarty, Lyndoch, Matawatchan, Radcliffe, Raglan, geden, Sebastopol and Wilberforce.

The electoral district was abolished in 1976 when it was redistributed between Hastings—Frontenac, Kingston and the Islands, Lanark—Renfrew—Carleton and Renfrew—Nipissing—Pembroke ridings.

== Members of Parliament ==
This riding has elected the following members of Parliament:

Parliament	Years	Member	Party
Riding created from Hastings—Frontenac, Kingston, Lanark, Prince Edward—Lennox, Renfrew North and Renfrew South
28th	1968–1972	Douglas Alkenbrack	Progressive Conservative
29th	1972–1974	Douglas Alkenbrack	Progressive Conservative
30th	1974–1979	Douglas Alkenbrack	Progressive Conservative
Riding dissolved into Hastings—Frontenac, Kingston and the Islands, Lanark—Renfrew—Carleton and Renfrew—Nipissing—Pembroke

== Election results ==
1968 Canadian federal election
Party	Candidate	Votes
Progressive Conservative	Douglas Alkenbrack	11,801
Liberal	Peter C. Connolly	9,953
New Democratic	John Moss	2,730
Independent PC	Clarence A. Milligan	571

1972 Canadian federal election
Party	Candidate	Votes
Progressive Conservative	Douglas Alkenbrack	16,563
Liberal	Peter MacKinnon	9,206
New Democratic	Mary Lloyd-Jones	3,283

1974 Canadian federal election
Party	Candidate	Votes
Progressive Conservative	Douglas Alkenbrack	14,102
Liberal	Grace Stalker	10,961
New Democratic	Wm. Bud Acton	4,157

== See also ==
- List of Canadian electoral districts
- Historical federal electoral districts of Canada
