= Douglas Alkenbrack =

Canadian politician

Almonte Douglas Alkenbrack
- Official 1974 portrait
- Born: June 2, 1912; Rydal Bank, Ontario (now a part of the township of Plummer Additional, Ontario)
- Died: March 19, 1998 (aged 85)
- Occupation(s): politician, lumberman

Almonte Douglas Alkenbrack (June 2, 1912 – March 19, 1998) was a Canadian politician and a lumberman. He was born in Rydal Bank, Ontario, which is now a part of the township of Plummer Additional, Ontario.

He was elected in 1962 as a Member of the House of Commons of Canada for the riding of Prince Edward—Lennox, Ontario representing the Progressive Conservative Party. He was re-elected in the 1963 election then in the 1965 election in the same riding and re-elected in the riding of Frontenac—Lennox and Addington, Ontario in 1968, 1972 and then in 1974. He was also a member of various standing committees.

Prior to his federal career in politics, he was first elected as a councillor to Napanee, Ontario in 1952 where he eventually became mayor in 1957.
