= William Varney Pettet =

Canadian politician

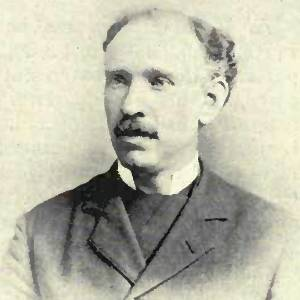
William Varney Pettet

William Varney Pettet (May 7, 1858 – June 21, 1938) was a farmer and political figure in Ontario, Canada. He represented Prince Edward in the House of Commons of Canada from 1896 to 1900 as a Patrons of Industry member.

He was born in West Lake, Prince Edward County, Canada West, the son of Daniel Pettet and Dorcas Young, and was educated in Picton and Belleville. In 1884, he married Mamie F. Morrison. He served on the council for Hallowell Township. Pettet ran unsuccessfully for reelection in 1900 as a Liberal candidate. He died in Picton at the age of 80.

== Electoral record ==
1896 Canadian federal election: Prince Edward
Party	Candidate	Votes
Patrons of Industry	Wm. Varney Pettet	2,188
Conservative	W. Boulter	1,967
