= Patrons of Industry =

1890s Canada farmers' interest group

The Patrons of Industry in Canada was a farmers' organization and political party formed in 1890 following the example of the Patrons of Industry of Michigan that had formed in 1889. The party was dedicated to upholding and encouraging the moral, social, intellectual, political and financial situation of farmers and to preserving the way of life that existed in farming communities in the late nineteenth century at a time when industries and cities were encroaching on farm communities. It cooperated with the urban labour movement to express their shared frustrations with big business.

The party first appeared in Canada as the Grand Association of the Patrons of Industry in Ontario, founded in 1890. It declared itself independent of the U.S. group in 1891.

Although centred in Ontario, the organization branched out into Manitoba), Alberta, Quebec and the Maritime provinces. The Patrons' membership exceeded 30,000 at its peak.

In the Maritimes, the Patrons of Industry had some successes but soon collapsed. In the 1895 New Brunswick general election, two Patrons of Industry MLAs were elected.

The Patrons had less success in PEI. Duncan Marshall, who would later become a cabinet minister in the Alberta and Ontario provincial legislatures and a Canadian senator, organized for the Patrons on Prince Edward Island. In 1895 he established more than eighty lodges in that province. In his office in Charlottetown, he edited the PEI Patrons' weekly newspaper, The Patron of Industry. He contested a provincial by-election in 1896 but was soundly defeated. The organization did not break PEI's established two-party system. Marshall left the province soon after the by-election, and the movement in the region collapsed.

The Patrons ran candidates in the 1894 Ontario provincial election and assisted in other candidates' campaigns. About 16 Patrons candidates or Patrons-sympathizing MPPs were elected. Three Patrons of Industry candidates were elected, and 13 other members of the Legislative Assembly were elected with Patrons of Industry support — 12 Liberals and one Conservative. They were:

- James Tucker West Wellington (re-elected in 1898)
- William Shore East Middlesex
- John Bennett Stormont
- John Caven Prince Edward
- Archibald Currie West Simcoe
- William Dynes Dufferin
- Thomas J.P. Gamey
- Grey, C.R.
- Joseph Longford Haycock Frontenac
- John Stevenson McDonald Centre Bruce
- George Nelson Kidd Carleton
- Alexander McLaren Hastings East
- David Mcpherson Glengarry
- David McNichol South Grey
- John McNeil South Perth
- Thomas Pardo West Kent Liberal/Patron

The Patrons of Industry ran 31 candidates (including three in Manitoba and one in Quebec) in the 1896 federal election (see below). David Dickson Rogers was elected by acclamation). William Varney Pettet, John Tolmie and Douglas Moffat also were elected.

The party was soon divided on the question of cooperation with the Ontario Liberal Party, and the group was virtually extinct by 1900. Both Rogers and Pettet unsuccessfully ran for re-election in the 1900 federal election but not under the Patrons banner.

The party achieved some of its goals, such as the institution of a cooling-off period to ban defeated politicians in Ontario from holding office in government for one year after defeat and a cut in tariffs effected in 1894.

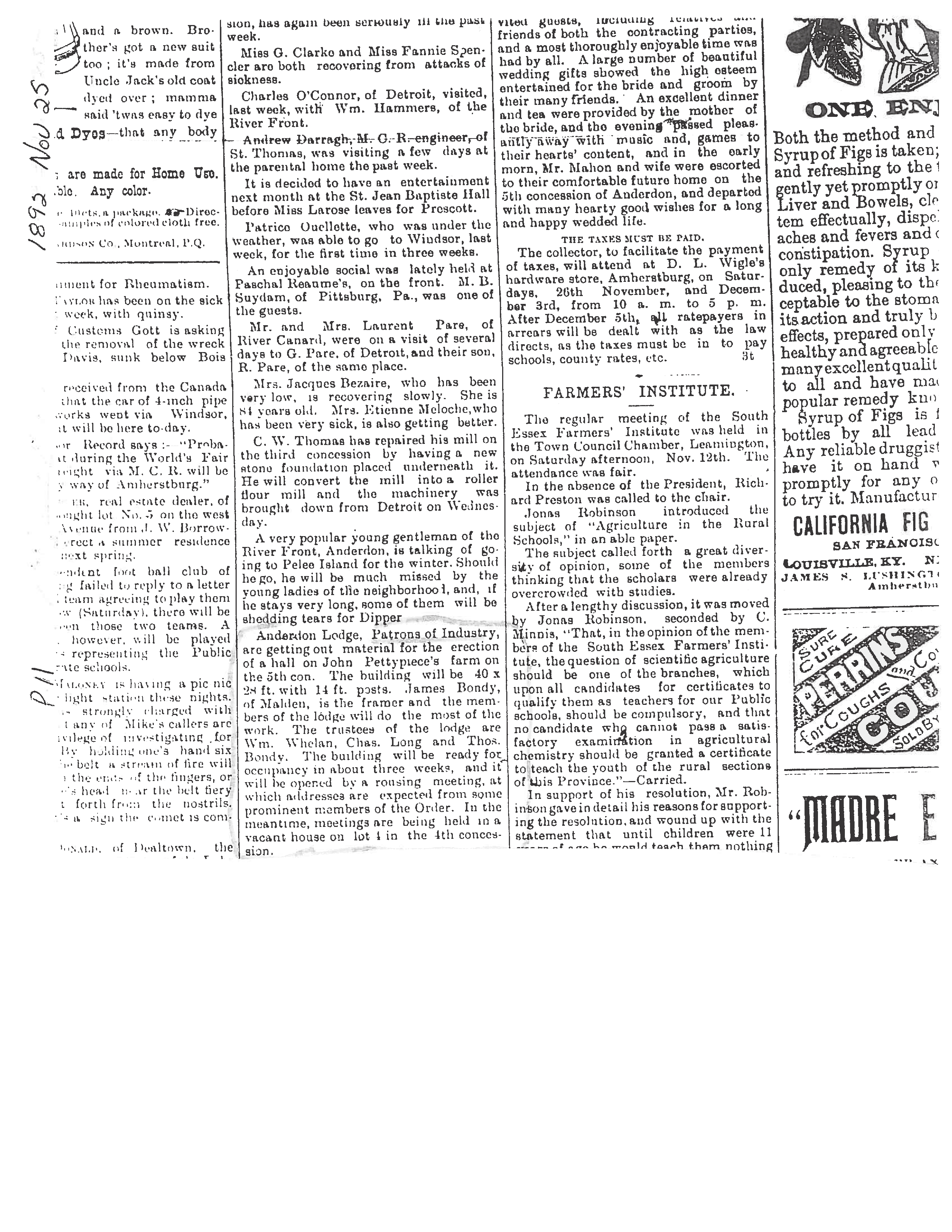

== 1896 federal election Patrons candidates ==
=== Manitoba ===
- W. Postlethwhaite, Brandon
- Charles Braithwaite, Macdonald
- G. A. J. A. Marshall, Marquette

=== Patrons candidates in 1896 Ontario election (alphabetically by name of district) ===
- David Dickson Rogers, Frontenac elected
- John Tolmie elected
- Douglas Moffat elected
- William Varney Pettet, Prince Edward elected
- James Tolton, Bruce East
- John G. Adams, Cornwall and Stormont
- Charles Jonas Thornton, Durham West
- J. P. Martyn, Elgin East
- Alexander A. McKillop, Elgin West
- Daniel Willis Mason, Essex North
- James Lockie Wilson, Glengarry
- James Bowes, Grey East
- William Allan, Grey South
- S. A. Beck, Haldimand and Monck
- James Balcanquel, Hastings East
- G. Mcl. Kilty, Huron West
- James Miller, Lanark North
- James H. Horton, Leeds South
- E. B. Switzer, Lennox
- William McGuire, Norfolk North
- George Walker, Norfolk South
- C. A. Mallory, Northumberland East
- John C. Rosevear, Northumberland West
- Duncan Graham, Ontario North
- Henry Joseph Cloran, Prescott
- Robert A. Jamieson, Renfrew South
- D. C. Anderson, Simcoe East
- Thomas W. Lennox, Simcoe South
- John Brown, York West

=== Quebec ===
- Francis F. Wellard, Compton

== See also ==
- United Farmers
- List of political parties in Canada
- Patrons of Industry in Manitoba
