= Picton, Ontario =

Picton
- Unincorporated community
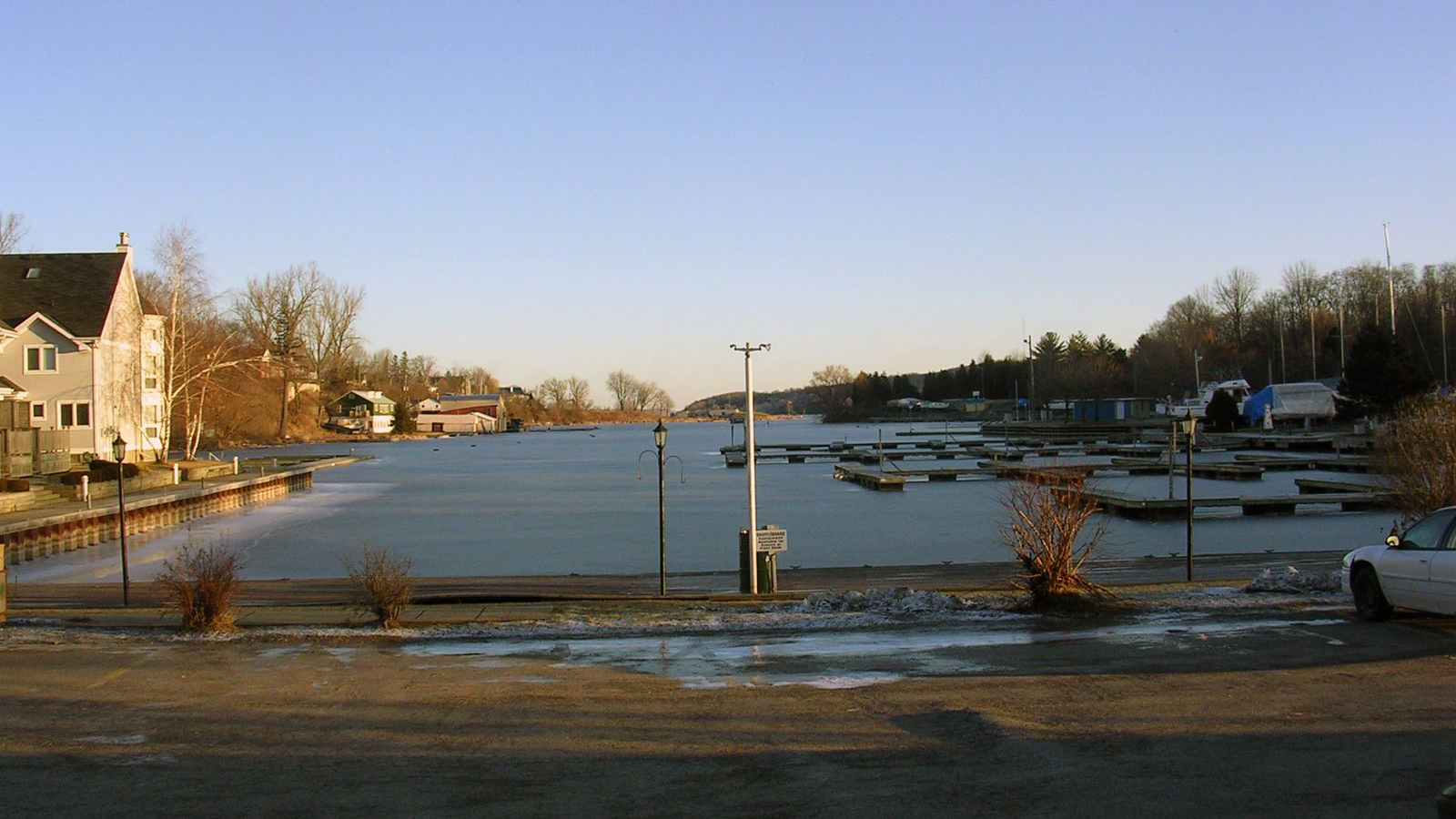
- Picton Harbour in the winter

- Flag

- Location within Prince Edward County Location within Southern Ontario
- Coordinates: 44°00′30″N 77°08′20″W
- Country: Canada
- Province: Ontario
- Regional municipality: Prince Edward County
- Incorporated (town): 1837

Government
  - Mayor: Steve Ferguson
  - MP: Chris Malette (Bay of Quinte, LPC)
  - MPP: Todd Smith (Prince Edward—Hastings, PC)

Area
  - Total: 4 km^{2} (1.5 sq mi)
- Elevation: 79 m (259 ft)

Population (2016)
  - Total: 4,702
  - Density: 931.7/km^{2} (2,413/sq mi)
- Time zone: UTC−05:00 (EST)
  - Summer (DST): UTC−04:00 (EDT)
- Postal Code FSA: K0K 2T0 & K0K 0A0
- Area code: 613
- Website: www.pecounty.on.ca

Picton is an unincorporated community located in Prince Edward County in southeastern Ontario, roughly 160 km (99 mi) east of Toronto. It is the county's largest community and former seat located at the southwestern end of Picton Bay, a branch of the Bay of Quinte, which is along the northern shoreline of Lake Ontario. The town is named for Lieutenant General Sir Thomas Picton, who served in the British Army during the Peninsular War in Spain and Portugal. He also saw action at the Battle of Waterloo, where he was killed. It was formerly incorporated as a town. Picton is home to the Picton Pirates of the Provincial Junior Hockey League Tod Division.

== History ==
=== General overview ===
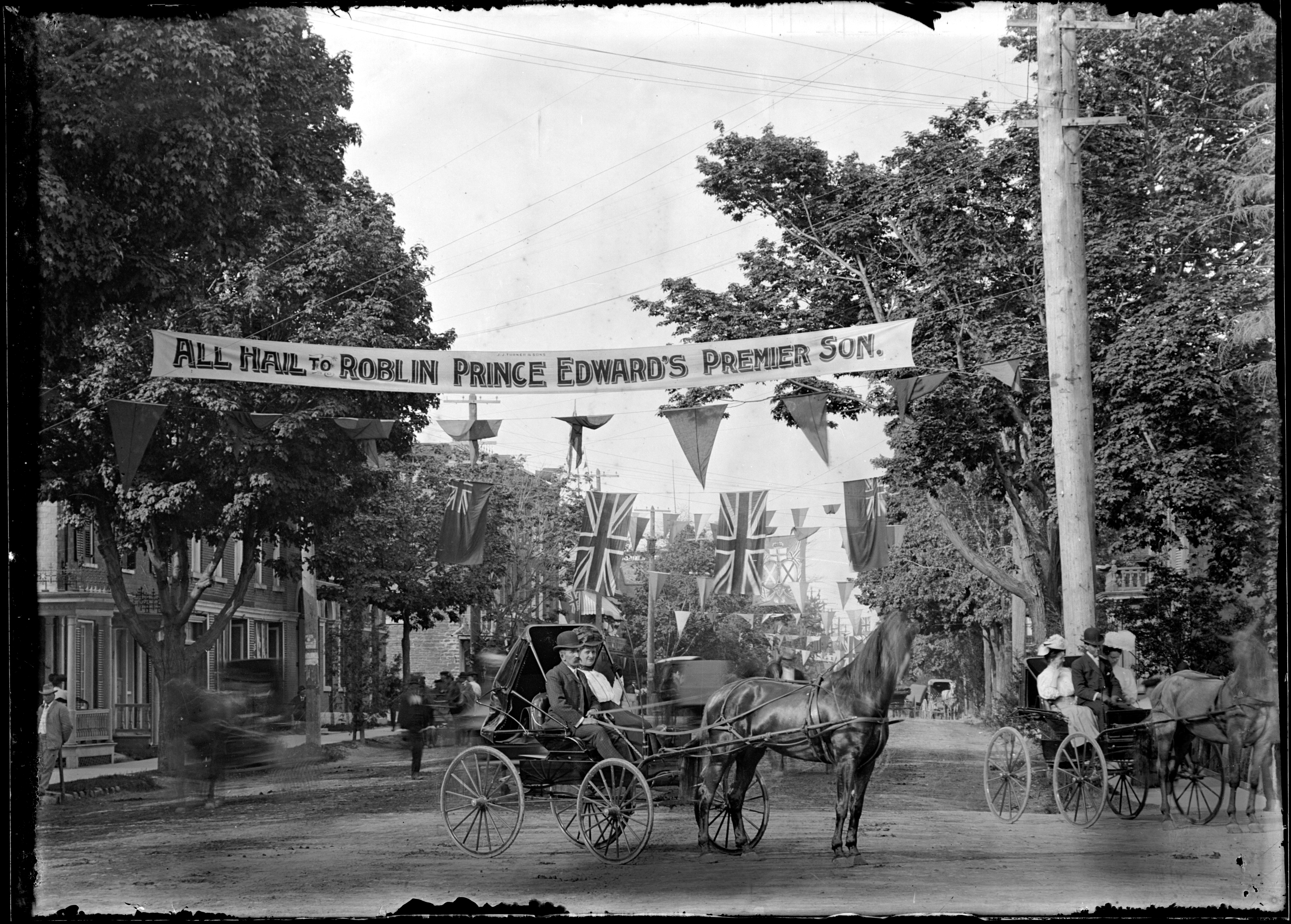
A street in Picton decorated in honour of Sir Rodmond Roblin, Premier of Manitoba, 1900-1915

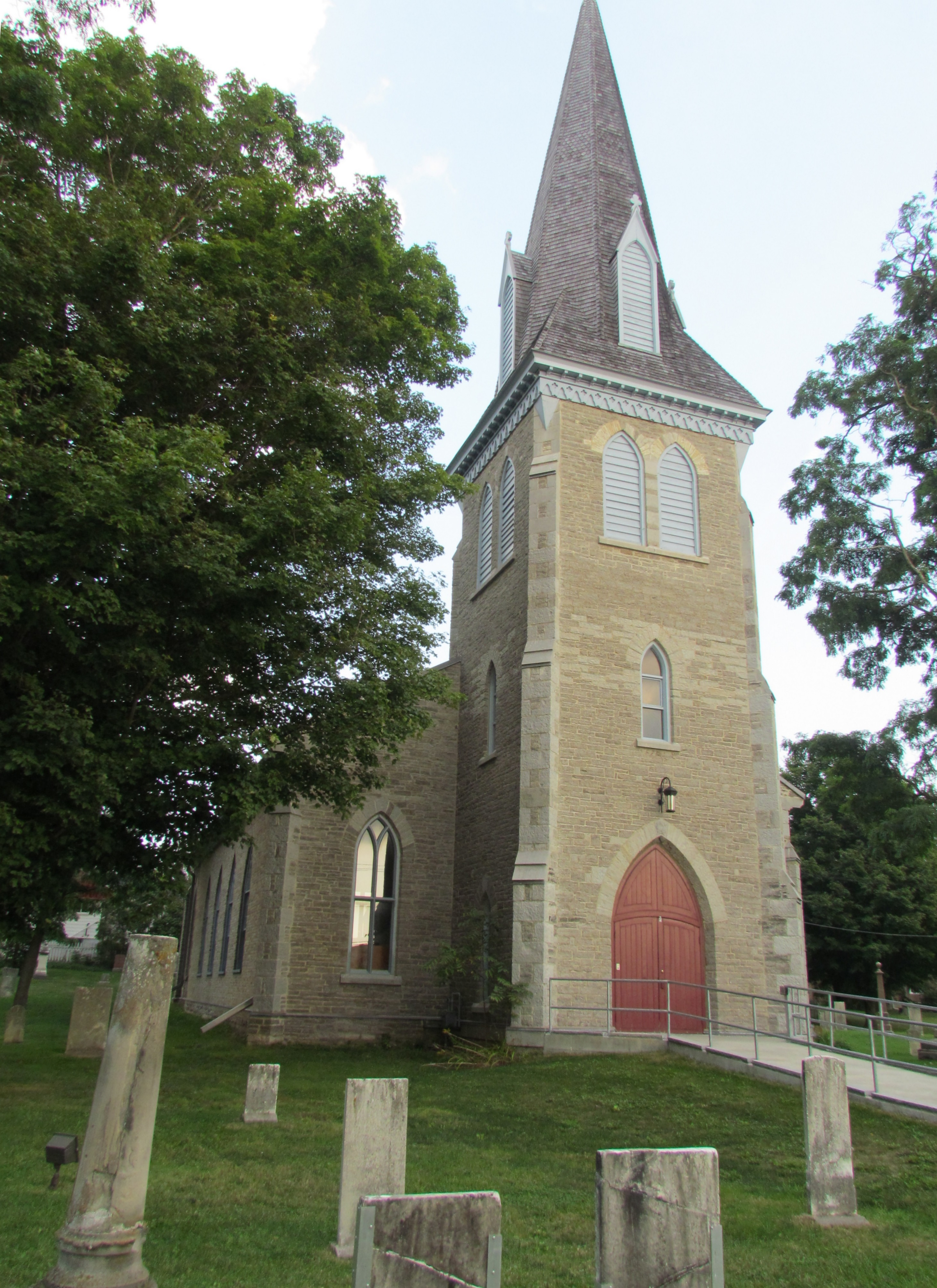
St. Mary Magdalene Church, c. 1825, Picton, Ontario

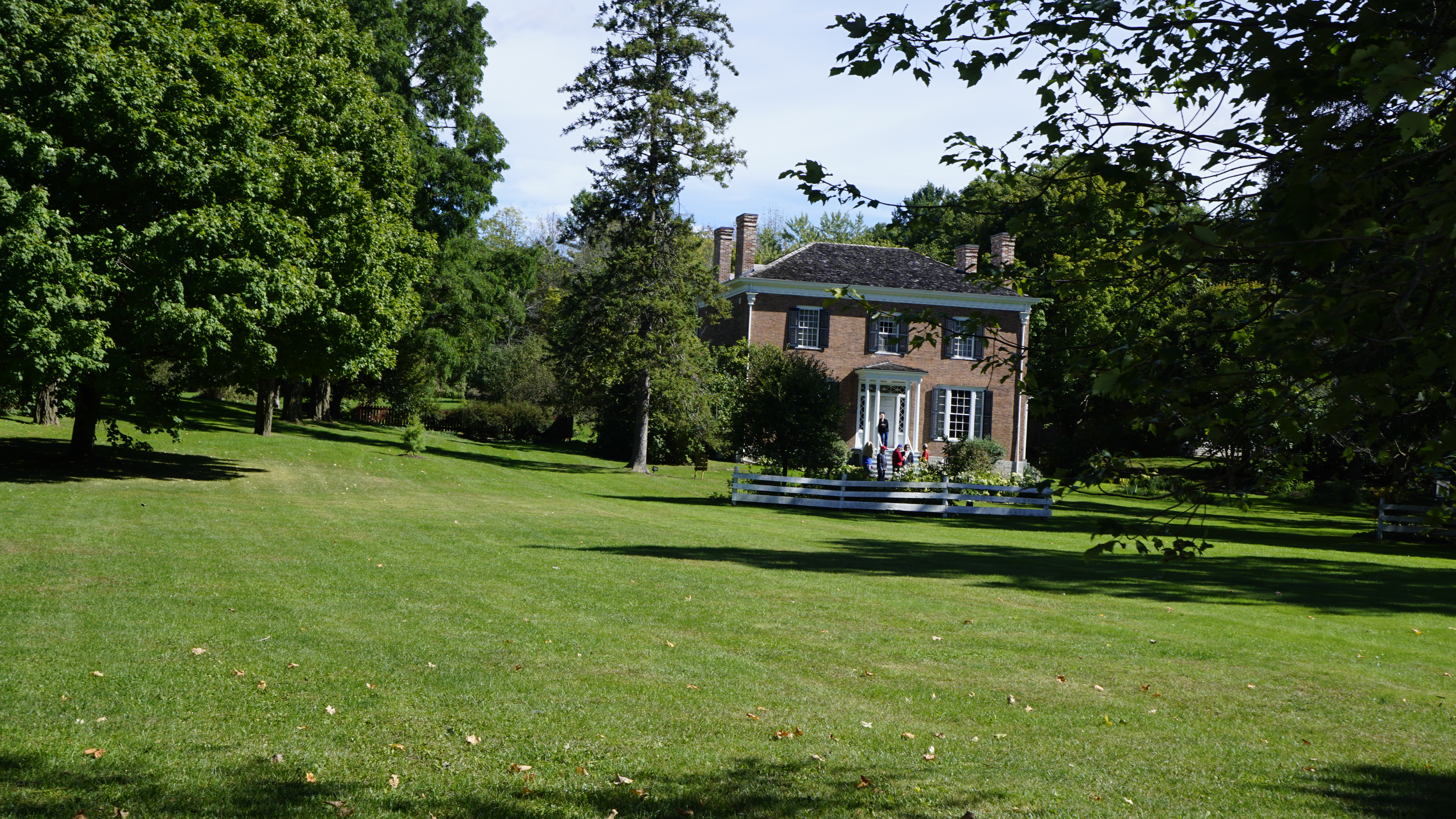
Macaulay House - Picton, ON, built in 1830

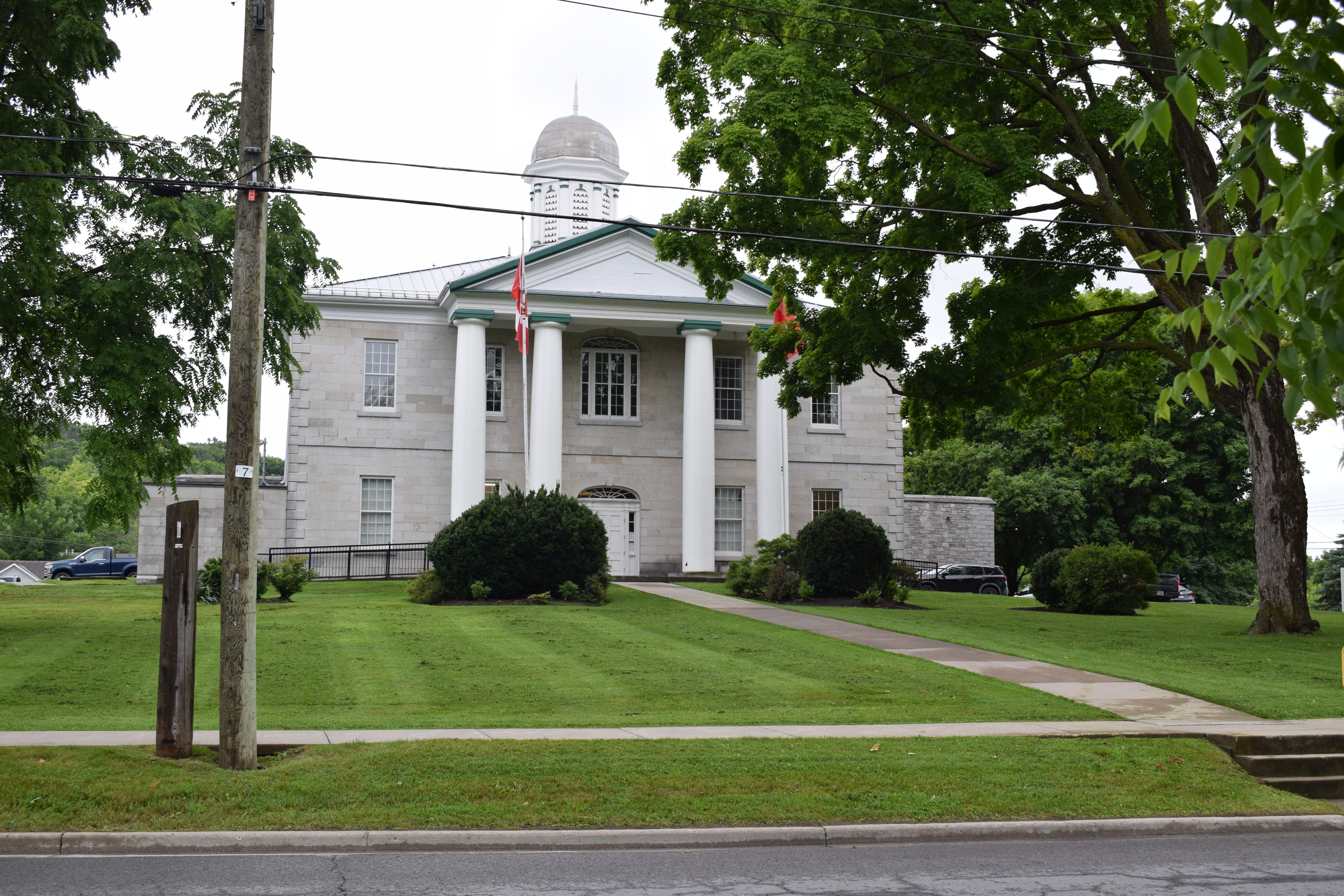
Picton, Ontario - Ontario Court of Justice, built in 1832

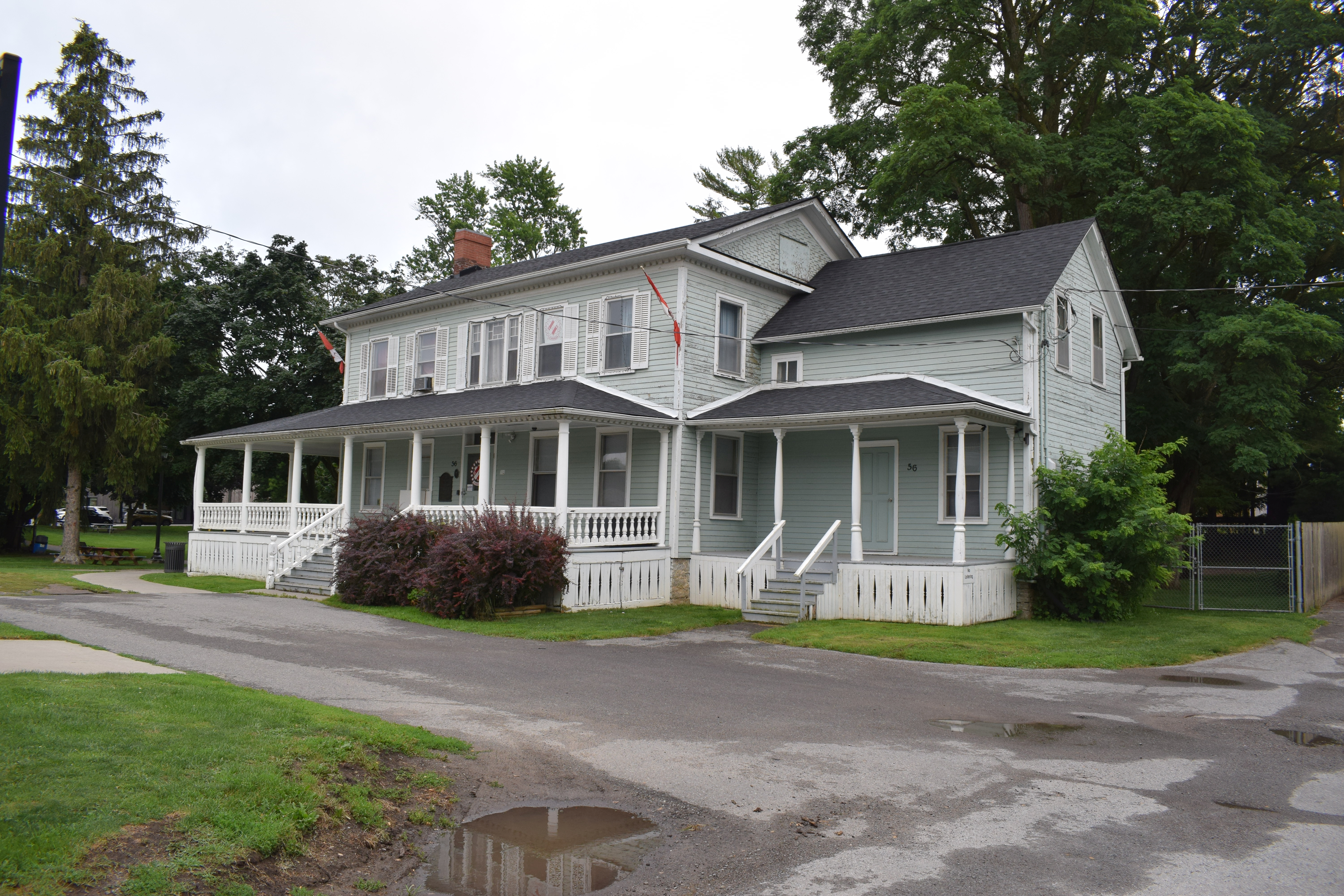
Picton, Ontario - Barker House, c.1812

Picton, originally named Hallowell, was first settled in the 1780s by Loyalists from the Thirteen Colonies. Prior to its incorporation in 1837, the modern-day town of Picton consisted of two separate villages, Hallowell Bridge and Picton, which occupied the opposite sides of Picton Bay. Picton Bay was named for General Sir Thomas Picton, an Allied Divisional commander at the Battle of Waterloo. It was here that Sir John A. Macdonald managed a law office for his uncle, Lowther P. MacPherson. In 1998, the town and all other municipalities in the county were dissolved and amalgamated into a single-tier municipality, the Corporation of the County of Prince Edward. Each of the former municipalities is now a ward of the county. Picton is Ward 1.

Census	Population
1841	1,200
1871	2,361
1901	3,698
1911	3,564
1921	3,356
1931	3,580
1941	3,901
1951	4,287
1961	4,862
1971	4,875
1981	4,361
1991	4,386
2001	4,563
2006	4,375
2011	4,474
2016	4,702

Map of Picton and Prince Edward County

=== Airfield ===
During the Second World War, the United Kingdom required training facilities outside the British Isles for the thousands of aircrew needed for the war effort. Because of geographical similarities to Great Britain, sparsely populated Prince Edward County was considered an ideal location for a Royal Air Force Bombing and Gunnery School. In the summer of 1940, an aerodrome was rapidly constructed and in November 1940, the RCAF moved in and began small-arms training at the facility. In April 1941, the RAF established No. 31 Bombing and Gunnery School on the site. The school became part of the British Commonwealth Air Training Plan.

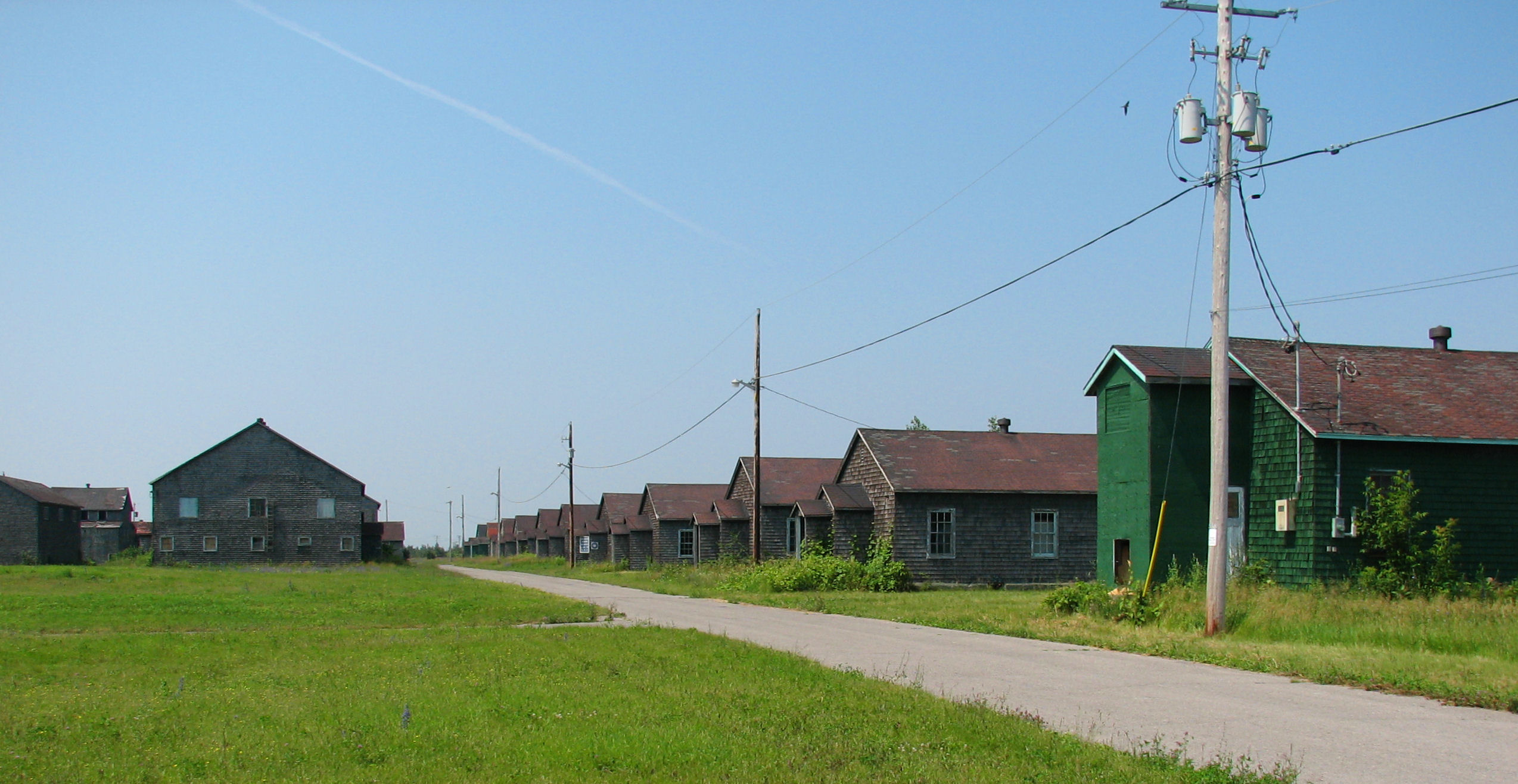
Abandoned barracks at Picton Airport

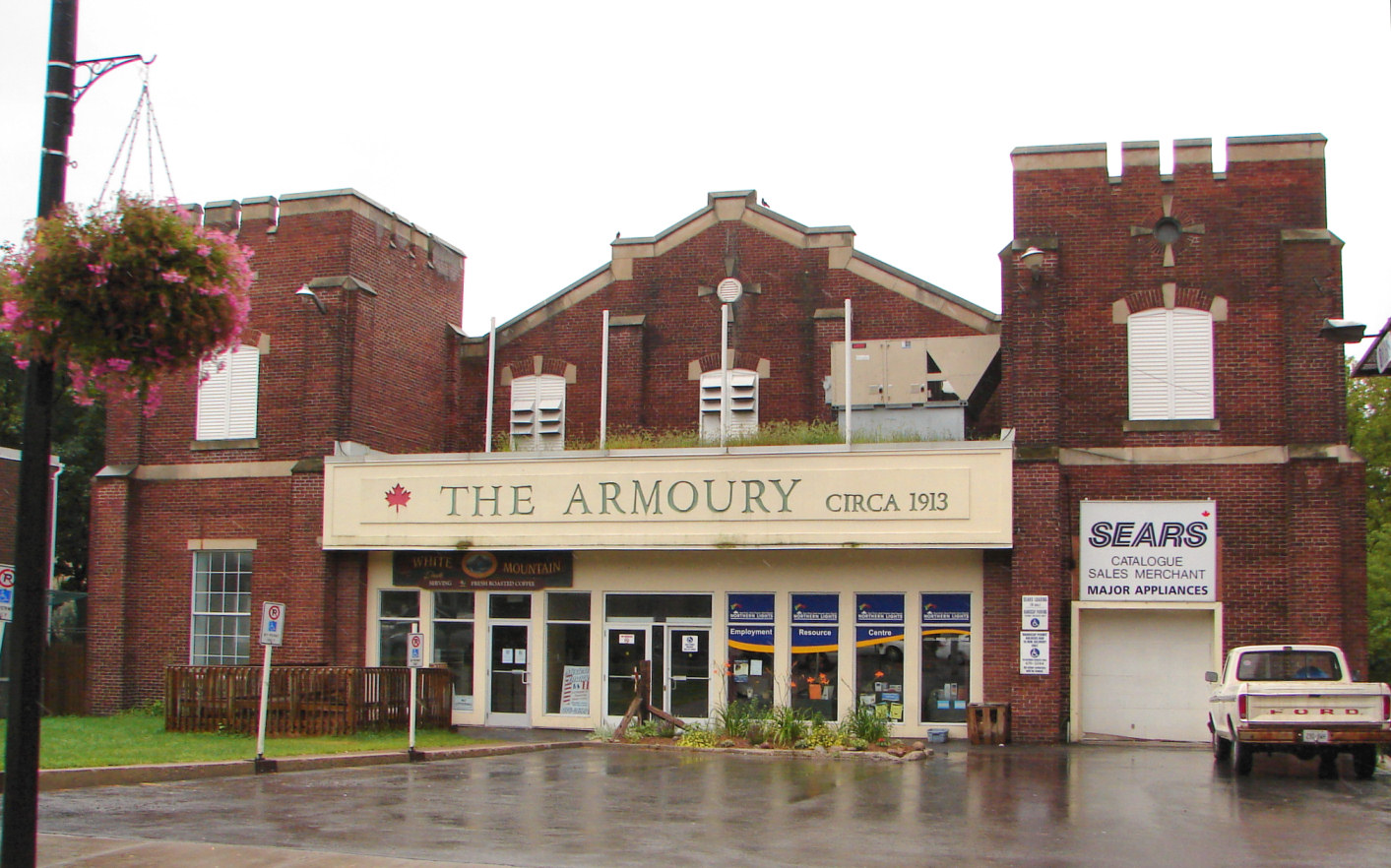
The Armoury, 206 Picton Main Street, Picton, ON K0K 2T0

Following the war, the Canadian Army maintained a training facility at the old aerodrome. It was renamed "Camp Picton" in 1960 when it became a fully operational Army base. In 1966, it was renamed Canadian Forces Base Picton, but this proved short-lived: in 1969, as part of the downsizing of the Canadian military, the base was closed and sold to Loch-Sloy Holding. Portions of the base have been divided up and have served many functions, including conversion of one of the newer barracks sections into a hospital (now defunct). Much of the old base housing is currently occupied as rental homes. The airfield is now known as Picton Airport. The original aerodrome facilities were built using different construction methods than most bases built by the Canadian military. The rapid construction meant that the hangars and other buildings were not designed for longevity, although most still remain standing today. The former Camp Picton now serves many diverse functions but the unique appearance of the base makes it a significant, if obscure, historical landmark. Due to its distinctive appearance, the dilapidated airport has been used as a filming location for several productions. External scenes for the made-for-TV film Haven, starring Natasha Richardson, Colm Feore and Martin Landau were filmed there. It also served as a backdrop for the 1993 CBC production Dieppe and was the filming location of Bomber Boys. It also served as the home of the Driver Rehabilitation Centre for the reality television program Canada's Worst Driver in 2005. Many businesses use the facilities, including a hammock outlet, an auction house and, since the late-1970s, the local Air Cadet squadron, 851 RC(Air)CS, Prince Edward. The airstrip is also the host to various motorsports events, such as those held by the St. Lawrence Auto Club, which regularly runs Solo II racing events in the summer months.

== Infrastructure ==
=== Transportation ===
Highway 33, also known as the Loyalist Parkway, passes through the centre of Picton and serves as its main link to the larger Ontario highway system. It is the main artery from the Glenora Ferry terminal (approximately 10 km (6.2 mi) from Picton) in the east to Carrying Place and the Murray Canal (approximately 40 km (25 mi) from Picton) as you exit the county in the northwest. Proceeding north-northeast from Picton is County Highway 49 which eventually connects to Highway 401 between Greater Napanee and Shannonville, after passing through a portion of Tyendinaga Mohawk Territory. Highway 33 also connects to Highway 62, which provides a link to the city of Belleville, approximately 30 km (19 mi) to the northwest. The city of Kingston, the eastern terminus of Highway 33, is located approximately 60 km (37 mi) by road east of Picton if you use the year-round Glenora Ferry to exit the county travelling east. At one time, Prince Edward County was served by an extensive rail system. However, the railway no longer exists. The former rail beds have been converted into recreational trails which wind around the outskirts of Picton and throughout the county and are used for various purposes year-round. Picton has extensive small-craft docking facilities and boat launch ramps. There are no facilities for heavy shipping at the tip of the bay, so large commercial vessels are generally not seen in the portion of Picton Bay near the town. However, east of town, on the northern shore of the bay, is the ESSROC cement plant which has industrial docking facilities.

=== Utilities ===
In the past, electrical services had been managed by the local utilities commission. In recent years, this was eliminated and electrical power is now managed by the central Hydro One, a former Government of Ontario Crown corporation.

== Economy ==
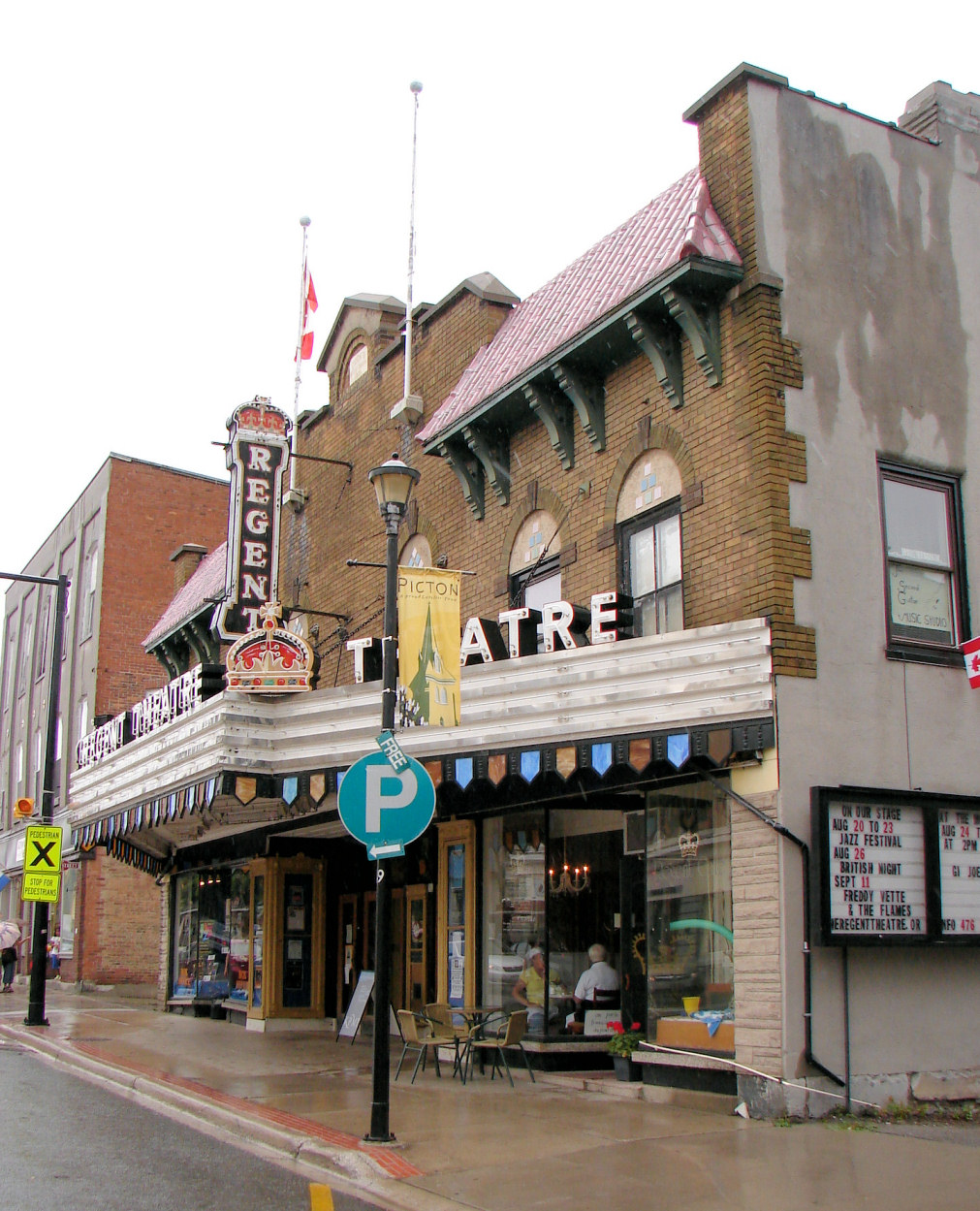
Regent Theatre, 224 Picton Main Street, Picton, ON K0K 2T0

=== Other industry ===
Just north of Picton are two heavy industrial firms: a cement plant owned by HeidelbergCement and operated by Lehigh Cement Company; and Picton Terminals, owned by ABNA Investments Ltd., a company held by the Doornekamp Family and based in Odessa, Ontario. Picton Terminals is an inland deep water cargo port offering loading, unloading, and storage services for shipping throughout the St. Lawrence Seaway and Great Lakes region.

=== Health care ===
Prince Edward County Memorial Hospital provides emergency services and has 18 beds for inpatient care. It also offers radiology, physiotherapy, and limited surgical services (endoscopy only at present), and houses a pharmacy.

== Education ==
The public school system is served by the Hastings & Prince Edward District School Board. The separate school system is served by the Algonquin and Lakeshore Catholic District School Board.

- Elementary schools: St. Gregory Catholic School
- Secondary school: Prince Edward Collegiate Institute
- Private school: Sonrise Christian Academy

The Pinecrest Memorial Elementary School closed in 2017 and the Queen Elizabeth Public School in 2018.

== Media ==
=== Print ===
- The Picton Gazette, Canada's oldest weekly newspaper.

=== Radio ===
- FM 99.3-CJPE ("County FM")

See also List of radio stations in Ontario.

=== Theatre ===
- Regent Theatre

== Notable residents ==
- Reema Abdo, who won a bronze medal at the 1984 Olympics in swimming.
- Cameron Ansell, voice actor
- Jack Gibson, ice hockey left winger
- Lyle Vanclief, former minister of agriculture and agri-food (1997–2003)
- Jess Jones, ice hockey forward

== See also ==
- List of townships in Ontario
