= Ontario =

Province of Canada

- Province
- Flag Coat of arms
- Motto(s): Ut Incepit Fidelis Sic Permanet (Latin) "Loyal she began, loyal she remains"
- Coordinates: 49°15′N 84°30′W
- Country: Canada
- Before confederation: Canada West
- Confederation: July 1, 1867 (1st, with New Brunswick, Nova Scotia, Quebec)
- Capital (and largest city): Toronto
- Largest metro: Greater Toronto Area

Government
  - Type: Parliamentary constitutional monarchy
  - Lieutenant Governor: Edith Dumont
  - Premier: Doug Ford
- Legislature: Legislative Assembly of Ontario
- Federal representation: Parliament of Canada
- House seats: 122 of 343 (35.6%)
- Senate seats: 24 of 105 (22.9%)

Area (2021 land)
  - Total: 1,076,395 km^{2} (415,598 sq mi)
  - Land: 892,411.76 km^{2} (344,562.11 sq mi)
  - Water: 158,654 km^{2} (61,257 sq mi) 14.7%
  - Rank: 5th
- 10.8% of Canada

Population (2021)
  - Total: 14,223,942
  - Estimate (Q3 2026): ▲16,262,121
  - Rank: 1st in Canada
  - Density: 15.94/km^{2} (41.3/sq mi)
- Demonym(s): Ontarian
- Official languages: English, French (in the court system and in educational systems)

GDP
  - Rank: 1st
  - Total (2024): CA$1,178.092 billion
  - Per capita: CA$74,143 (8th)

HDI
  - HDI (2025): 0.945—Very high (1st)

Time zones
- East of 90th meridian west: UTC−05:00 (EST)
  - Summer (DST): UTC−04:00 (EDT)
- West of 90th meridian west: UTC−05:00 (EST)
- Canadian postal abbr.: ON
- Postal code prefix: K; L; M; N; P
- ISO 3166 code: CA-ON
- Flower: White trillium
- Tree: Eastern white pine
- Bird: Common loon
- Website: ontario.ca
- Rankings include all provinces and territories

Ontario (Note: /ɒnˈtɛərioʊ/ on-TAIR-ee-oh; French: [ɔ̃taʁjo]) is the southernmost province of Canada. Located in Central Canada, (Note: Ontario is located in the geographic eastern half of Canada, but it has historically and politically been considered to be part of Central Canada.) Ontario is the country's most populous province. As of the 2021 Canadian census, it is home to over 14 million people, which is approximately 38.5% of the country's population. Ontario is the second-largest province by total area, after Quebec, and the fourth-largest jurisdiction of all the Canadian provinces and territories. Ontario's capital is Canada’s most populous city, Toronto. The province is additionally home to the country’s national capital, Ottawa.

Ontario is bordered by the province of Manitoba to the west, Hudson Bay and James Bay to the north, and Quebec to the east and northeast. To the south, it is bordered by the U.S. states of (from west to east) Minnesota, Michigan, Ohio, Pennsylvania (through Lake Erie), and New York. Almost all of Ontario's 2,700-kilometre (1,700 mi) international border with the United States follows rivers and lakes: from the westerly Lake of the Woods, eastward along the major rivers and lakes of the Great Lakes drainage system. There is only about one kilometre (0.62 mi) of actual land border, made up of portages including Height of Land Portage on the Minnesota border in Quetico-Superior Country. Detroit–Windsor, North America's largest and wealthiest transborder agglomeration, connects Ontario to Michigan.

The great majority of Ontario's population and arable land are in Southern Ontario, and while agriculture remains a significant industry, the province's economy depends highly on manufacturing. In contrast, Northern Ontario is sparsely populated with cold winters and heavy forestation, with mining and forestry making up the region's major industries.

== Etymology ==
Ontario is a term thought to have Indigenous origins, either Ontarí:io, a Huron (Wyandot) word meaning "great lake", or possibly skanadario, which means "beautiful water" or "sparkling water" in the Iroquoian languages. Ontario has about 250,000 freshwater lakes. The first mention of the name Ontario was in 1641, when "Ontario" was used to describe the land on the north shore of the easternmost part of the Great Lakes. It was adopted as the name of the new province at Confederation in 1867.

== Geography ==
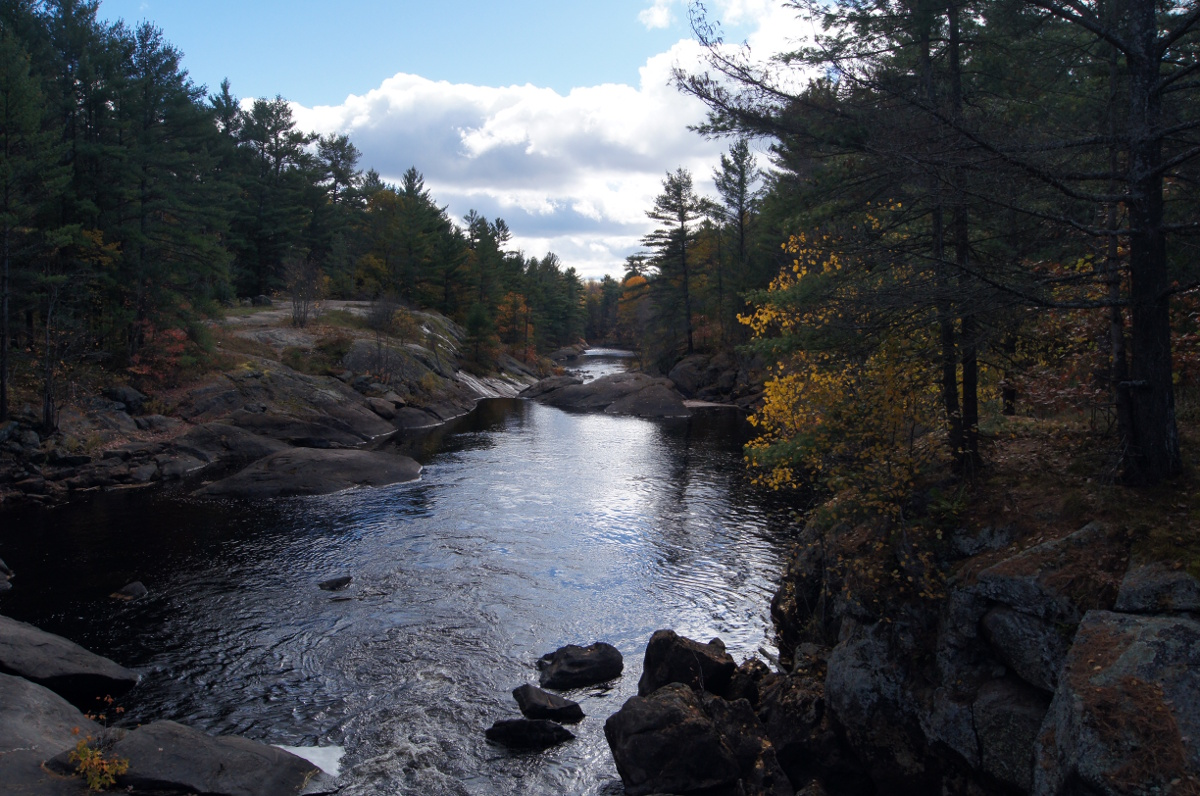
Typical landscape of the Canadian Shield at Queen Elizabeth II Wildlands Provincial Park, located in Central Ontario.

The thinly populated Canadian Shield, which dominates the northwestern and central portions of the province, comprises over half the land area of Ontario. Although this area mostly does not support agriculture, it is rich in minerals, partly covered by the Central and Midwestern Canadian Shield forests, and studded with lakes and rivers. Northern Ontario is subdivided into two sub-regions: Northwestern Ontario and Northeastern Ontario.

The virtually unpopulated Hudson Bay Lowlands in the extreme north and northeast are mainly swampy and sparsely forested.

Southern Ontario is further sub-divided into four sub-regions: Central Ontario (although not actually the province's geographic centre), Eastern Ontario, Golden Horseshoe and Southwestern Ontario (parts of which were formerly referred to as Western Ontario).

Despite the rarity of mountainous terrain in the province, there are large areas of uplands, particularly within the Canadian Shield, which traverses the province from northwest to southeast and also above the Niagara Escarpment, which crosses the south. The highest point is Ishpatina Ridge at 693 metres (2,274 feet) above sea level in Temagami, Northeastern Ontario. In the south, elevations of over 500 m (1,640 ft) are surpassed near Collingwood, above the Blue Mountains in the Dundalk Highlands and in hilltops near the Madawaska River in Renfrew County.

The Carolinian forest zone covers most of the southwestern region of the province. The temperate and fertile Great Lakes-Saint Lawrence Valley in the south is part of the Eastern Great Lakes lowland forests ecoregion where the forest has now been largely replaced by agriculture, industrial and urban development. A well-known geographic feature is Niagara Falls, part of the Niagara Escarpment. The Saint Lawrence Seaway allows navigation to and from the Atlantic Ocean as far inland as Thunder Bay in Northwestern Ontario. Northern Ontario covers approximately 87% of the province's surface area; conversely, Southern Ontario contains 94% of the population.

Point Pelee is a peninsula of Lake Erie in southwestern Ontario (near Windsor and Detroit, Michigan) that is the southernmost extent of Canada's mainland. Pelee Island and Middle Island in Lake Erie extend slightly farther. All are south of 42°N – slightly farther south than the northern border of California.

=== Climate ===
Köppen climate types of Ontario

Ontario's climate varies by season and location. Three air sources affect it: cold, dry, arctic air from the north (dominant factor during the winter months, and for a longer part of the year in far northern Ontario); Pacific polar air crossing in from the western Canadian Prairies/US Northern Plains; and warm, moist air from the Gulf of Mexico and the Atlantic Ocean. The effects of these major air masses on temperature and precipitation depend mainly on latitude, proximity to major bodies of water and to a small extent, terrain relief. In general, most of Ontario's climate is classified as humid continental.

Ontario has three main climatic regions:

- The surrounding Great Lakes greatly influence the climatic region of southern Ontario. During the fall and winter, the release of heat stored by the lakes moderates the climate near the shores which give parts of Southern Ontario not only a later start to winter conditions, but also generally milder winter temperatures than mid-continental areas at lower latitudes. In many areas, warmer spring temperatures are delayed by surrounding colder lake temperatures Parts of Southwestern Ontario and the Hamilton-Niagara region (generally south of a line from Sarnia–Toronto) have a moderate humid continental climate (Köppen climate classification Dfa), similar to the inland Mid-Atlantic states and lower Great Lakes portion of the Midwestern United States. The region has warm to hot, humid summers and cold winters. Annual precipitation ranges from 750–1,000 millimetres (30–39 inches) and is well distributed throughout the year. Most of this region lies in the lee of the Great Lakes, making for abundant snow in some areas. In December 2010, the snowbelt set a new record when it was hit by more than a metre of snow within 48 hours.
- The next climatic region is Central and Eastern Ontario, which has a moderate humid continental climate (Köppen Dfb). This region has warm and sometimes hot summers with colder, longer winters, ample snowfall (even in regions not directly in the snowbelts) and annual precipitation similar to the rest of Southern Ontario.

In the northeastern parts of Ontario, extending south as far as Kirkland Lake, the cold waters of Hudson Bay depress summer temperatures, making it cooler than other locations at similar latitudes. The same is true on the northern shore of Lake Superior, which cools hot, humid air from the south, leading to cooler summer temperatures. Along the eastern shores of Lake Superior and Lake Huron winter temperatures are slightly moderated but come with frequent heavy lake-effect snow squalls that increase seasonal snowfall totals to upwards of 3 m (10 ft) in some places. These regions have higher annual precipitation, in some places over 100 cm (39 in).

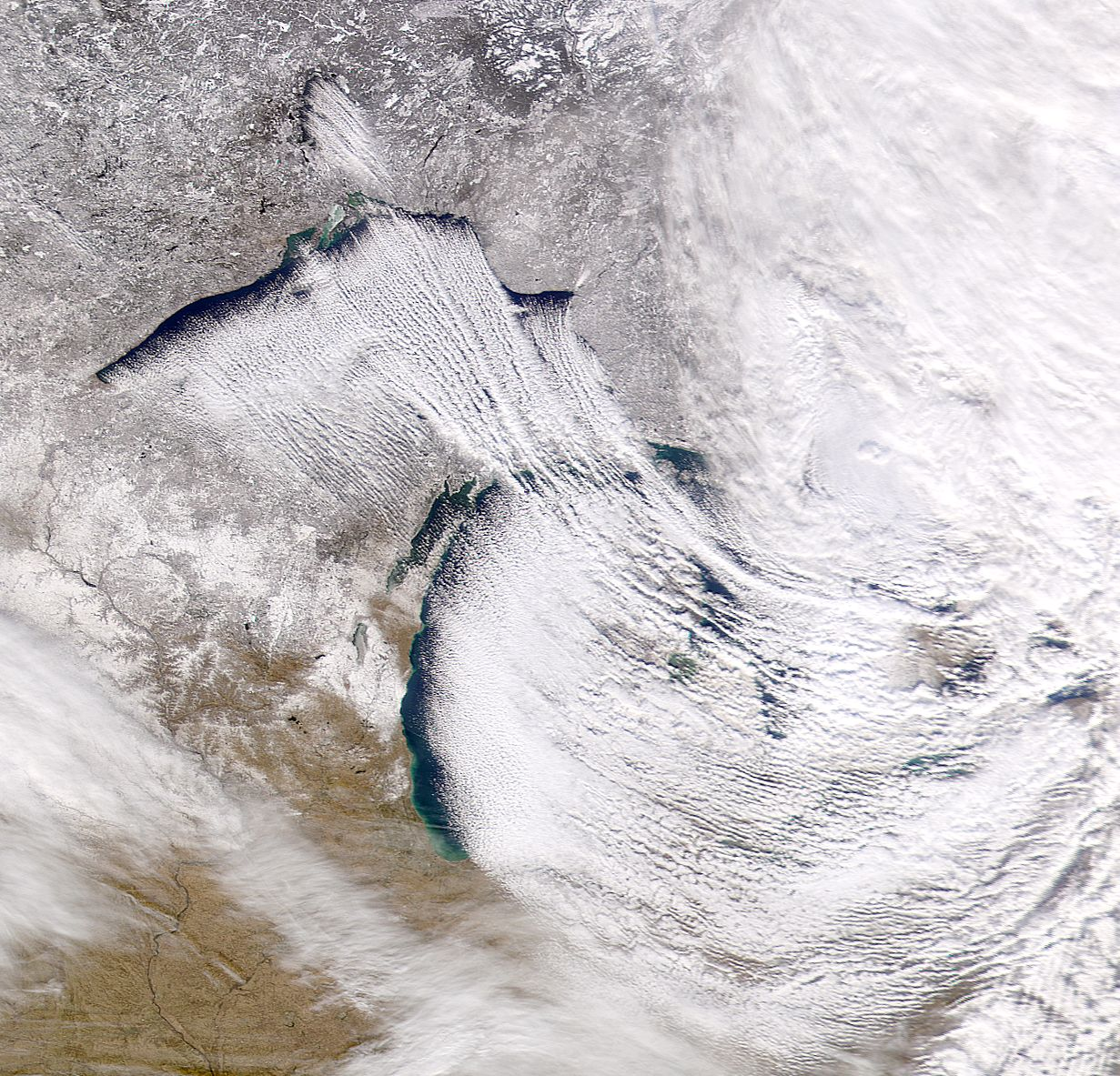
Cold northwesterly wind over the Great Lakes creating lake-effect snow. Lake-effect snow most frequently occurs in the snowbelt regions of the province.

- The northernmost parts of Ontario – primarily north of 50°N – have a subarctic climate (Köppen Dfc) with long, severely cold winters and short, cool to warm summers with dramatic temperature changes possible in all seasons. With no major mountain ranges blocking sinking Arctic air masses, temperatures of −40 °C (−40 °F) are not uncommon; snow remains on the ground for sometimes over half the year. Snow accumulation can be high in some areas. Precipitation is generally less than 70 cm (28 in) and peaks in the summer months in the form of rain or thunderstorms.

Severe thunderstorms peak in summer. Windsor, in Southwestern Ontario, has the most lightning strikes per year in Canada, averaging 33 days of thunderstorm activity per year. In a typical year, Ontario averages 11 confirmed tornado touchdowns. Ontario had a record 29 tornadoes in both 2006 and 2009. Tropical depression remnants occasionally bring heavy rains and winds in the south, but are rarely deadly. A notable exception was Hurricane Hazel, which struck Southern Ontario, centred on Toronto, in October 1954.

Average daily maximum and minimum temperatures for selected locations in Ontario
City	July (°C)	July (°F)	January (°C)	January (°F)
Windsor (Windsor International Airport)	28/18	83/64	0/−7	32/19
Niagara Falls (NPCSH)	27/17	81/63	0/−8	30/18
Toronto (The Annex)	27/18	81/65	0/−7	31/20
Midland (Water Pollution Control Plant)	26/16	78/61	−4/–13	25/8
Ottawa (City)	27/16	80/60	−5/−14	23/7
Sudbury (Sudbury Airport)	25/13	77/56	−8/−18	18/1
Thunder Bay (Thunder Bay International Airport)	25/11	77/52	−8/−19	18/−3
Kenora (Kenora Airport)	24/15	76/59	−11/−20	11/−4
Moosonee (UA)	23/9	73/48	−14/–26	8/–15

== History ==
=== Indigenous habitation (pre–1610) ===
Paleo-Indians were the first people to settle on the lands of Ontario, about 11,000 years ago, after crossing the Bering land bridge from Asia to North America between 25,000 and 50,000 years ago. During the Archaic period, which lasted from 8000 to 1000 BC, the population slowly increased, with a generally egalitarian hunter-gatherer society and a warmer climate. Trading routes also began emerging along the St. Lawrence River and around the Great Lakes. Hunting and gathering remained predominant throughout the early Woodland period, and social structures and trade continued to develop.

Around 500 AD, corn cultivation began, later expanding to include beans and squash around 1100 AD. (Note: These three agricultural crops are known as the Three Sisters (agriculture)) Increased agriculture enabled more permanent, fortified, and significantly larger settlements. In southern Ontario during the 1400s, the population of some villages numbered in the thousands, with longhouses that could house over a hundred people. Around this time, large-scale warfare began in southern Ontario, leading to the emergence of Iroquoian groups, including the Neutral Confederacy, Erie and Wendat (Huron). Groups in northern Ontario were primarily Algonquian and included the Ojibwe, who traded with the Haudenosaunee.

Many ethnocultural groups emerged and came to exist on the lands of Ontario: the Algonquins, Mississaugas, Ojibway, Cree, Odawa, Potawatomi, and Haudenosaunee.

=== Pays d'en Haut (1610–1763) ===
In 1608, Samuel de Champlain established France's first colonial settlement in New France, the Habitation de Québec (now Quebec City). French explorers continued to travel west, establishing new villages along the coasts of the Saint Lawrence River. French explorers, the first of which was Étienne Brûlé who explored the Georgian Bay area in 1610–1612, mapped Southern Ontario and named the region Pays d'en Haut ("Upper Country"), in reference to the region being upstream of the Saint Lawrence River. The colony of the Pays d'en Haut was formally established in 1610 as an administrative dependency of Canada, and was for defence and business rather than a settlement colony. The territory of the Pays-d'en-Haut was quite large and includes the present-day province of Ontario, and, in whole or in part, the U.S. states of Minnesota, Wisconsin, Illinois, Indiana, Michigan, Ohio, Pennsylvania and New York. Indigenous peoples were the vast majority of the Pays d'en Haut population.

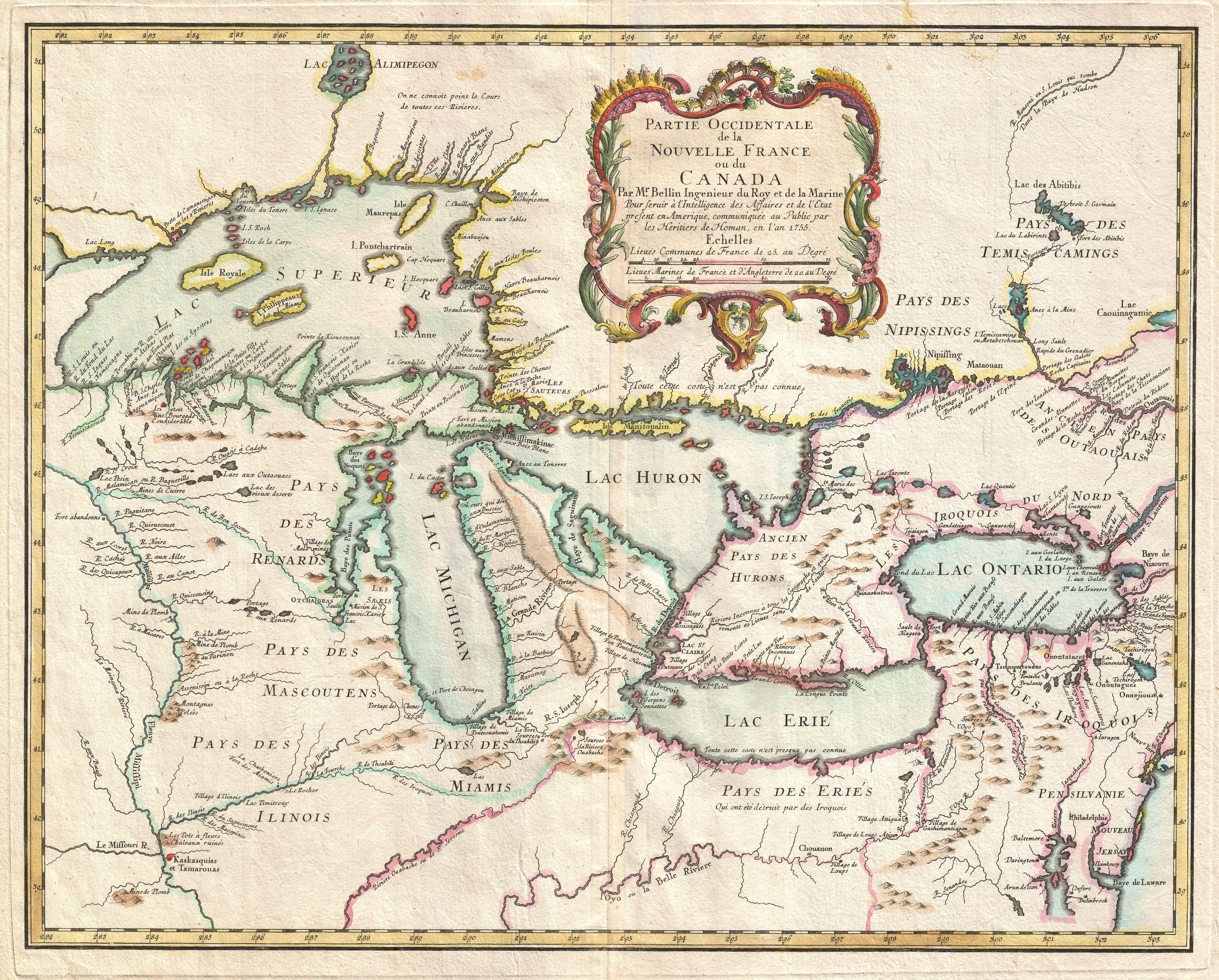
A 1755 map of the Pays d'en Haut region of New France, an area that included most of Ontario

As for Northern Ontario, the English explorer Henry Hudson sailed into Hudson Bay in 1611 and claimed its drainage basin for England. The area would become known as Rupert's Land.

De Champlain reached Lake Huron in 1615, and French missionaries, such as the Jésuites and Supliciens, began to establish posts along the Great Lakes. The French allied with most Indigenous groups of Ontario, all for the fur trade and for defence against Haudenosaunee attacks, which was later called the Iroquois Wars). The French would declare their Indigenous allies to be subjects of the King of France and would often act as mediators between different groups. The Haudenosaunee later allied themselves with the British.

From 1634 to 1640, the Huron were devastated by European infectious diseases, such as measles and smallpox, to which they had no immunity. By 1700, the Haudenosaunee had been driven out or left the area that would become Ontario and the Mississaugas of the Ojibwa had settled the north shore of Lake Ontario. The remaining Huron settled north of Quebec City.

During the French and Indian War, the North American theatre of the Seven Years' War of 1754 to 1763, the British defeated the armies of New France and its Indigenous allies. In the Treaty of Paris 1763 France ceded most of its possessions in North America to Britain. Using the Quebec Act, Britain re-organised the territory into the Province of Quebec.

=== Province of Quebec (1763–1791) ===
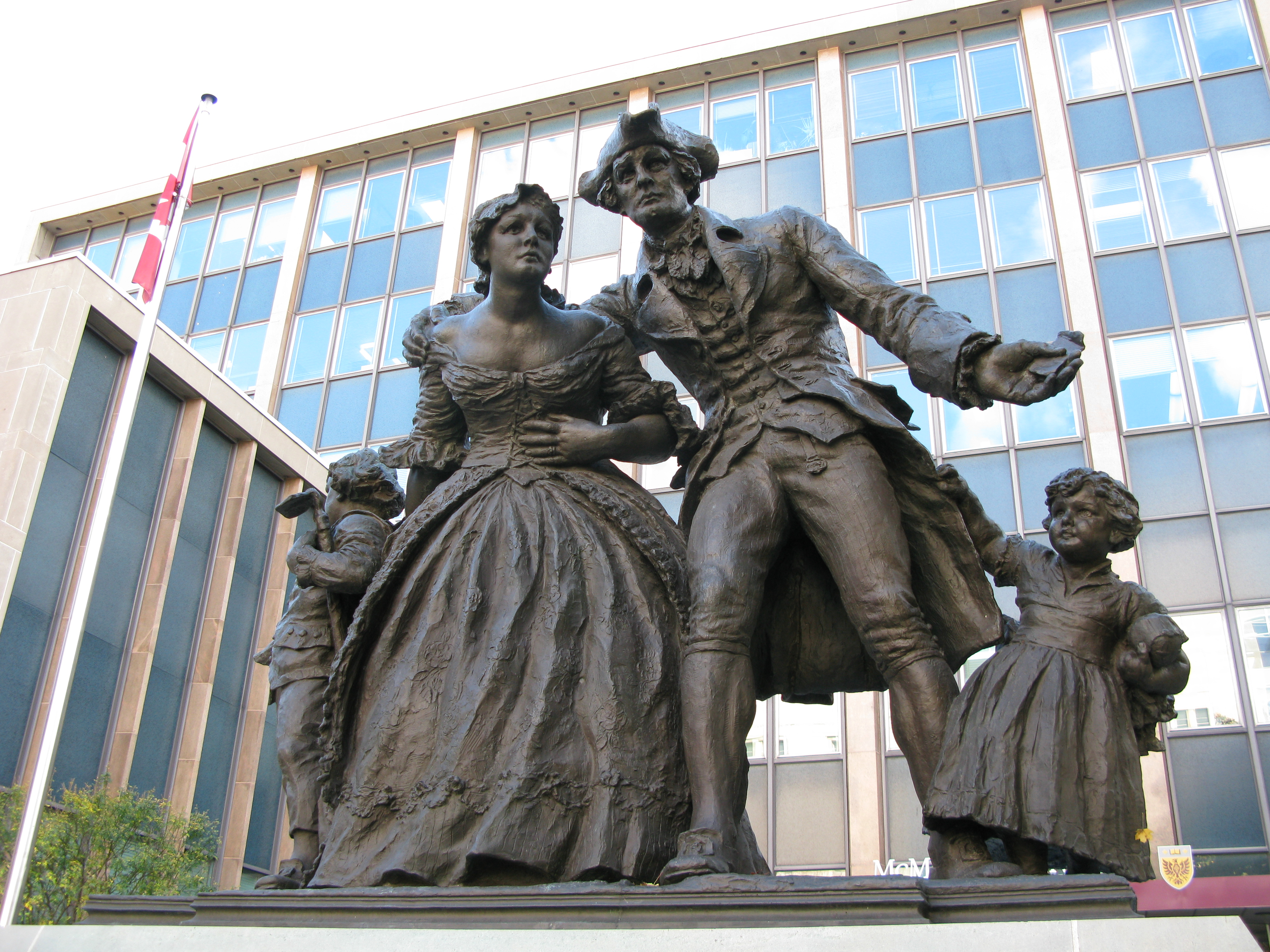
A monument in Hamilton commemorating the United Empire Loyalists, a group of settlers who fled the United States during or after the American Revolution

In 1782–1784, 5,000 United Empire Loyalists entered what is now Ontario following the American Revolution. The Kingdom of Great Britain granted them 200 acres (81 ha) land and other items with which to rebuild their lives. The British also set up reserves in Ontario for the Mohawks who had fought for the British and had lost their land in the state of New York. Other Haudenosaunee, also displaced from New York were resettled in 1784 at the Six Nations reserve at the west end of Lake Ontario. The Mississaugas, displaced by European settlements, would later move to Six Nations also.

After the American War of Independence, the first reserves for First Nations were established. These are situated at Six Nations (1784), Tyendinaga (1793) and Akwesasne (1795). Six Nations and Tyendinaga were established by the British for those Indigenous groups who had fought on the side of the British, and were expelled from the new United States. Akwesasne was a pre-existing Mohawk community and its borders were formalized under the 1795 Jay Treaty.

In 1788, while part of the province of Quebec, southern Ontario was divided into four districts: Hesse, Lunenburg, Mecklenburg, and Nassau. In 1792, the four districts were renamed: Hesse became the Western District, Lunenburg became the Eastern District, Mecklenburg became the Midland District, and Nassau became the Home District. Counties were created within the districts.

The population of Canada west of the St. Lawrence-Ottawa River confluence substantially increased during this period, a fact recognized by the Constitutional Act of 1791, which split Quebec into the Canadas: Upper Canada southwest of the St. Lawrence-Ottawa River confluence, and Lower Canada east of it.

=== Upper Canada (1791–1841) ===
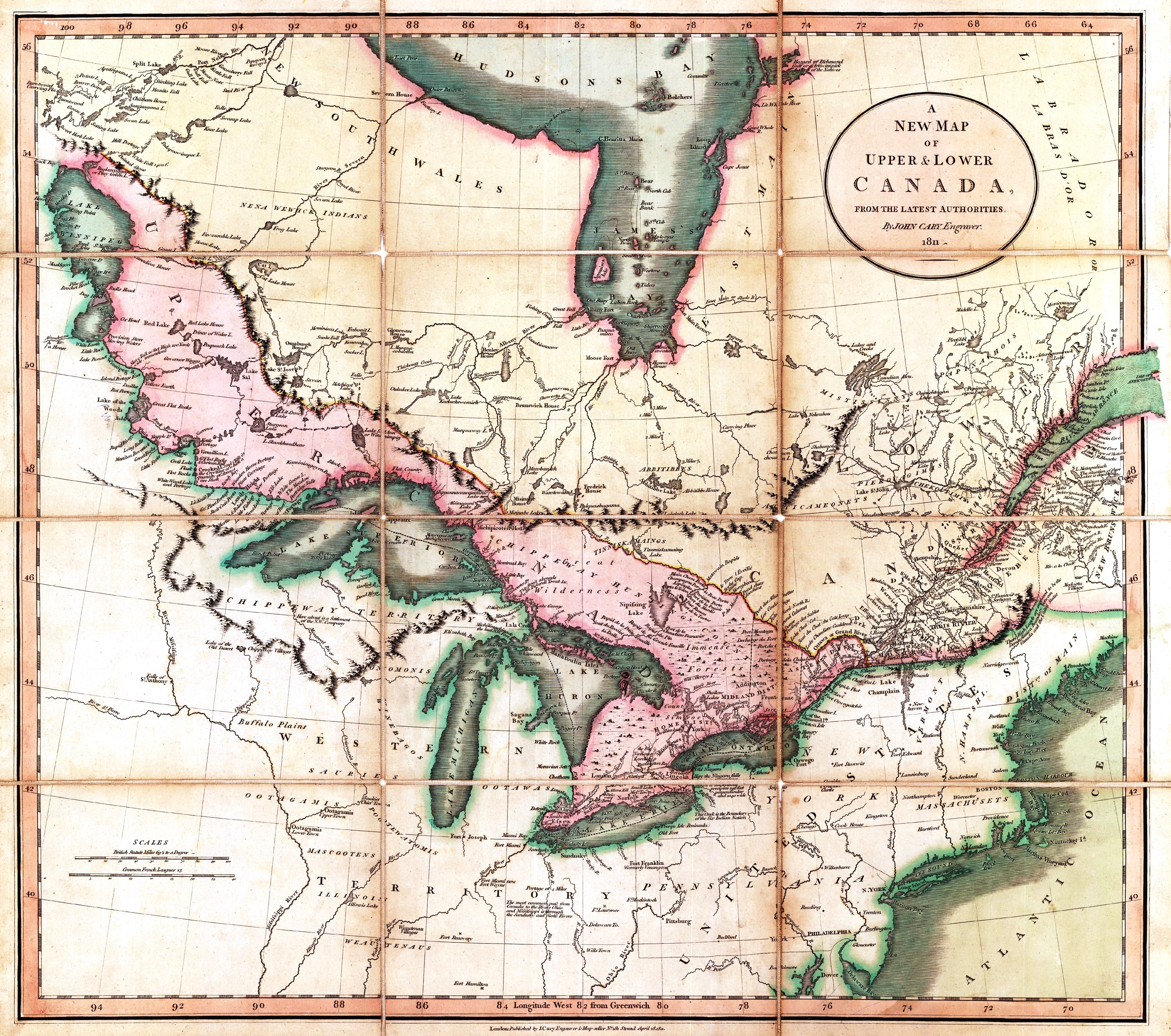
A map of Upper Canada, 1811

John Graves Simcoe was appointed Upper Canada's first Lieutenant governor in 1793. A second wave of Americans, not all of them necessarily loyalists moved to Upper Canada after 1790 until the pre-war of 1812, many seeking available cheap land, and at the time, lower taxation.

By 1798, there were eight districts: Eastern, Home, Johnstown, London, Midland, Newcastle, Niagara, and Western. By 1826, there were eleven districts: Bathurst, Eastern, Gore, Home, Johnstown, London, Midland, Newcastle, Niagara, Ottawa, and Western. By 1838, there were twenty districts: Bathurst, Brock, Colbourne, Dalhousie, Eastern, Gore, Home, Huron, Johnstown, London, Midland, Newcastle, Niagara, Ottawa, Prince Edward, Simcoe, Talbot, Victoria, Wellington, and Western.

American troops in the War of 1812 invaded Upper Canada across the Niagara River and the Detroit River, but were defeated and pushed back by the British, Canadian fencibles and militias, and First Nations warriors. However, the Americans eventually gained control of Lake Erie and Lake Ontario. The 1813 Battle of York saw American troops defeat the garrison at the Upper Canada capital of York. The Americans looted the town and burned the Upper Canada Parliament Buildings during their brief occupation. The British would burn the American capital of Washington, D.C. in 1814.

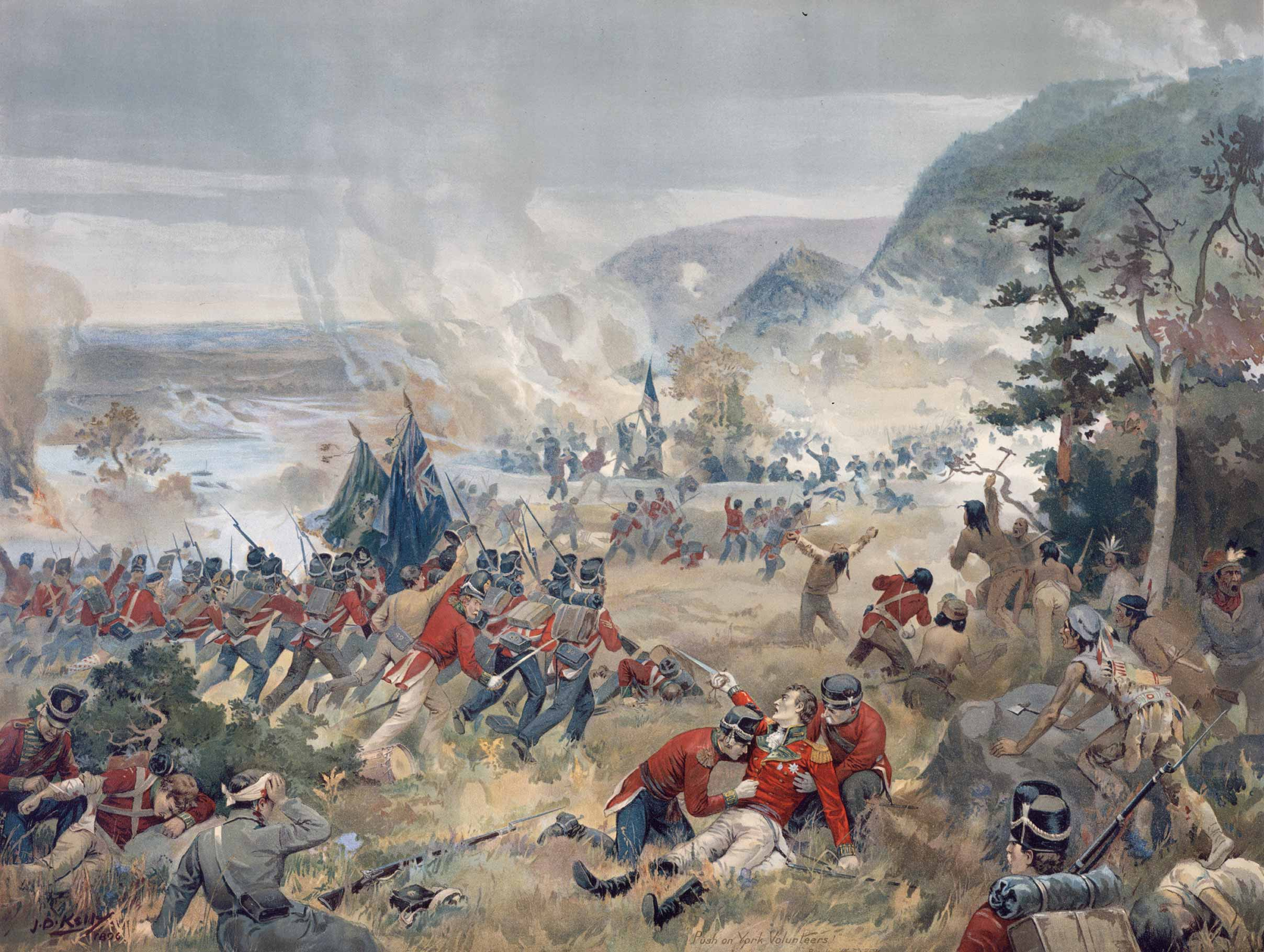
A depiction of the Battle of Queenston Heights, during the War of 1812. Upper Canada was an active theatre of operation during the conflict.

After the War of 1812, relative stability allowed for increasing numbers of immigrants to arrive from Europe rather than from the United States. As was the case in the previous decades, this immigration shift was encouraged by the colonial leaders. Despite affordable and often free land, many arriving newcomers, mostly from Britain and Ireland, found frontier life with the harsh climate difficult, and some of those with the means eventually returned home or went south. However, population growth far exceeded emigration in the following decades. It was a mostly agrarian-based society, but canal projects and a new network of plank roads spurred greater trade within the colony and with the United States, thereby improving previously damaged relations over time.

Meanwhile, Ontario's numerous waterways aided travel and transportation into the interior and supplied water power for development. As the population increased, so did the industries and transportation networks, which in turn led to further development. By the end of the century, Ontario vied with Quebec as the nation's leader in terms of growth in population, industry, arts and communications.

Unrest in the colony began to chafe against the aristocratic Family Compact, who governed while benefiting economically from the region's resources, and who did not allow elected bodies power. This resentment spurred republican ideals and sowed the seeds for early Canadian nationalism. Accordingly, rebellion in favour of responsible government rose in both regions; Louis-Joseph Papineau led the Lower Canada Rebellion and William Lyon Mackenzie, the first mayor of Toronto, led the Upper Canada Rebellion. In Upper Canada, the rebellion was quickly a failure. Mackenzie escaped to the United States, where he declared the Republic of Canada on Navy Island on the Niagara River.

=== Canada West (1841–1867) ===
Although both rebellions were put down in short order, the British government sent Lord Durham to investigate the causes. He recommended responsible government be granted, and Lower and Upper Canada be re-joined in an attempt to assimilate the French Canadians. Accordingly, the two colonies were merged into the Province of Canada by the Act of Union 1840, with the capital initially at Kingston, and Upper Canada becoming known as Canada West. Responsible government was achieved in 1848. There were heavy waves of immigration in the 1840s, and the population of Canada West more than doubled by 1851 over the previous decade. As a result, for the first time, the English-speaking population of Canada West surpassed the French-speaking population of Canada East, tilting the representative balance of power.

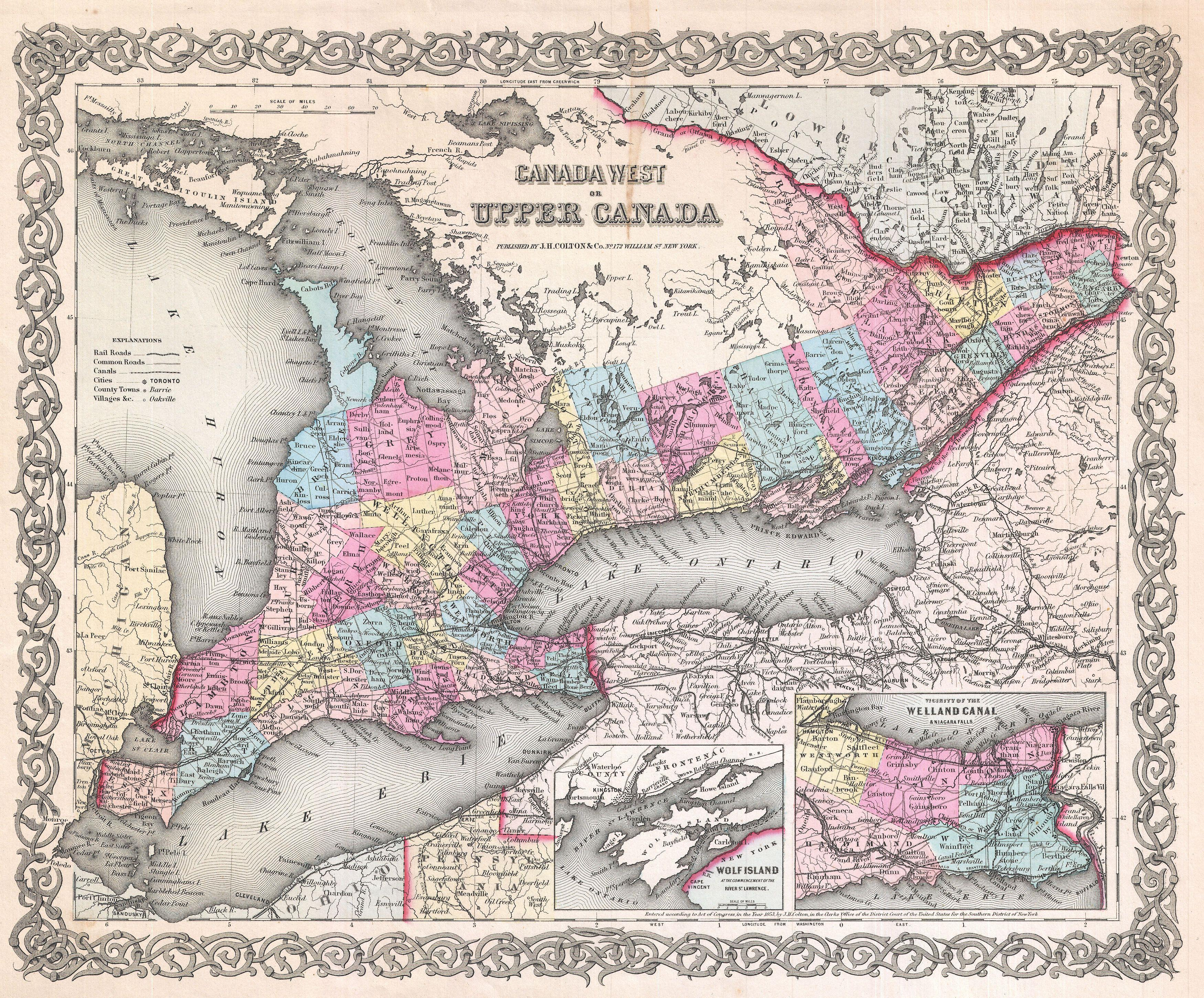
Map of Canada West from 1855. Canada West formed the western portion of the Province of Canada.

In 1849, the districts of southern Ontario were formed into the Province of Canada, and county governments took over certain municipal responsibilities. The Province of Canada also began creating districts in sparsely populated Northern Ontario with the establishment of Algoma District and Nipissing District in 1858.

An economic boom in the 1850s coincided with railway expansion across the province, further increasing the economic strength of Central Canada. With the repeal of the Corn Laws and a reciprocity agreement in place with the United States, various industries such as timber, mining, farming and alcohol distilling benefited tremendously.

A political stalemate developed in the 1850s, between finely balanced political groups: conservative and reform groups from Canada West and Canada East aligned against reform and liberal groups from Canada East each group having some support from French-Canadian and English-Canadian legislators. There was also a fear of aggression from the United States during and immediately after the American Civil War. These factors led to the formation of the Great Coalition in the elected Legislative Assembly, which initiated a series of conferences in the 1860s to effect a broader federal union of all British North American colonies. The British North America Act took effect on July 1, 1867, establishing the Dominion of Canada, initially with the four provinces of Nova Scotia, New Brunswick, Quebec, and Ontario. The Province of Canada was divided into Ontario and Quebec so that each linguistic group would have its own province. Both Quebec and Ontario were required by section 93 of the British North America Act to safeguard existing educational rights and privileges of the Protestant and Catholic minorities. Thus, separate Catholic schools and school boards were permitted in Ontario. However, neither province had a constitutional requirement to protect its French- or English-speaking minority. Toronto was formally established as Ontario's provincial capital.

=== Canadian province (1867–present) ===
An animated map of the changes to the borders of Canada. The borders of Ontario were last changed in 1912.

The borders of Ontario, its new name in 1867, were provisionally expanded north and west. When the Province of Canada was formed, its borders were not entirely clear, and Ontario claimed eventually to reach all the way to the Rocky Mountains and Arctic Ocean. With Canada's acquisition of Rupert's Land, Ontario was interested in clearly defining its borders, especially since some of the new areas in which it was interested were rapidly growing. After the federal government asked Ontario to pay for construction in the new disputed area, the province asked for an elaboration on its limits, and its boundary was moved north to the 51st parallel north.

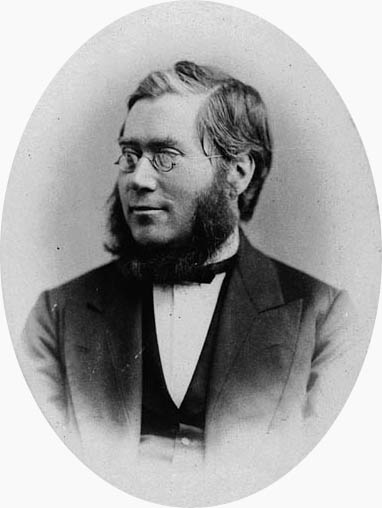
Oliver Mowat, Premier of Ontario from 1872 to 1896

Once constituted as a province, Ontario proceeded to assert its economic and legislative power. In 1872, the lawyer Oliver Mowat became Premier of Ontario and remained as premier until 1896. He fought for provincial rights, weakening the power of the federal government in provincial matters, usually through well-argued appeals to the Judicial Committee of the Privy Council. His battles with the federal government greatly decentralized Canada, giving the provinces far more power than John A. Macdonald had intended. He consolidated and expanded Ontario's educational and provincial institutions, created districts in Northern Ontario, and fought to ensure that those parts of Northwestern Ontario not historically part of Upper Canada (the vast areas north and west of the Lake Superior-Hudson Bay watershed, known as the District of Keewatin) would become part of Ontario, a victory embodied in the Canada (Ontario Boundary) Act, 1889. He also presided over the emergence of the province into the economic powerhouse of Canada. Mowat was the creator of what is often called Empire Ontario.

Beginning with Macdonald's National Policy (1879) and the construction of the Canadian Pacific Railway (1875–1885) through Northern Ontario and the Canadian Prairies to British Columbia, Ontario manufacturing and industry flourished. However, population increases slowed after a large recession hit the province in 1893, thus slowing growth drastically but for only a few years. Many newly arrived immigrants and others moved west along the railway to the Prairie Provinces and British Columbia, sparsely settling Northern Ontario.

The northern and western boundaries of Ontario were in dispute after Canadian Confederation. Ontario's right to northwestern Ontario was determined by the Judicial Committee of the Privy Council in 1884 and confirmed by the Canada (Ontario Boundary) Act, 1889 of the Parliament of the United Kingdom. By 1899, there were seven northern districts: Algoma, Manitoulin, Muskoka, Nipissing, Parry Sound, Rainy River, and Thunder Bay. Four more northern districts were created between 1907 and 1912: Cochrane, Kenora, Sudbury and Timiskaming.

Mineral exploitation accelerated in the late 19th century, leading to the rise of major mining centres in the northeast, such as Sudbury, Cobalt, and Timmins. The province harnessed its water power to generate hydro-electric power and created the state-controlled Hydro-Electric Power Commission of Ontario, later Ontario Hydro. The availability of cheap electric power further facilitated the development of industry. The Ford Motor Company of Canada was established in 1904 and the McLaughlin Motor Car Company (later General Motors Canada) was founded in 1907. The motor vehicle industry became the most lucrative industry for the Ontario economy during the 20th century.

In July 1912, the Conservative government of James Whitney issued Regulation 17 which severely limited the availability of French-language schooling to the province's French-speaking minority. French Canadians reacted with outrage, journalist Henri Bourassa denouncing the "Prussians of Ontario". The regulation was eventually repealed in 1927.

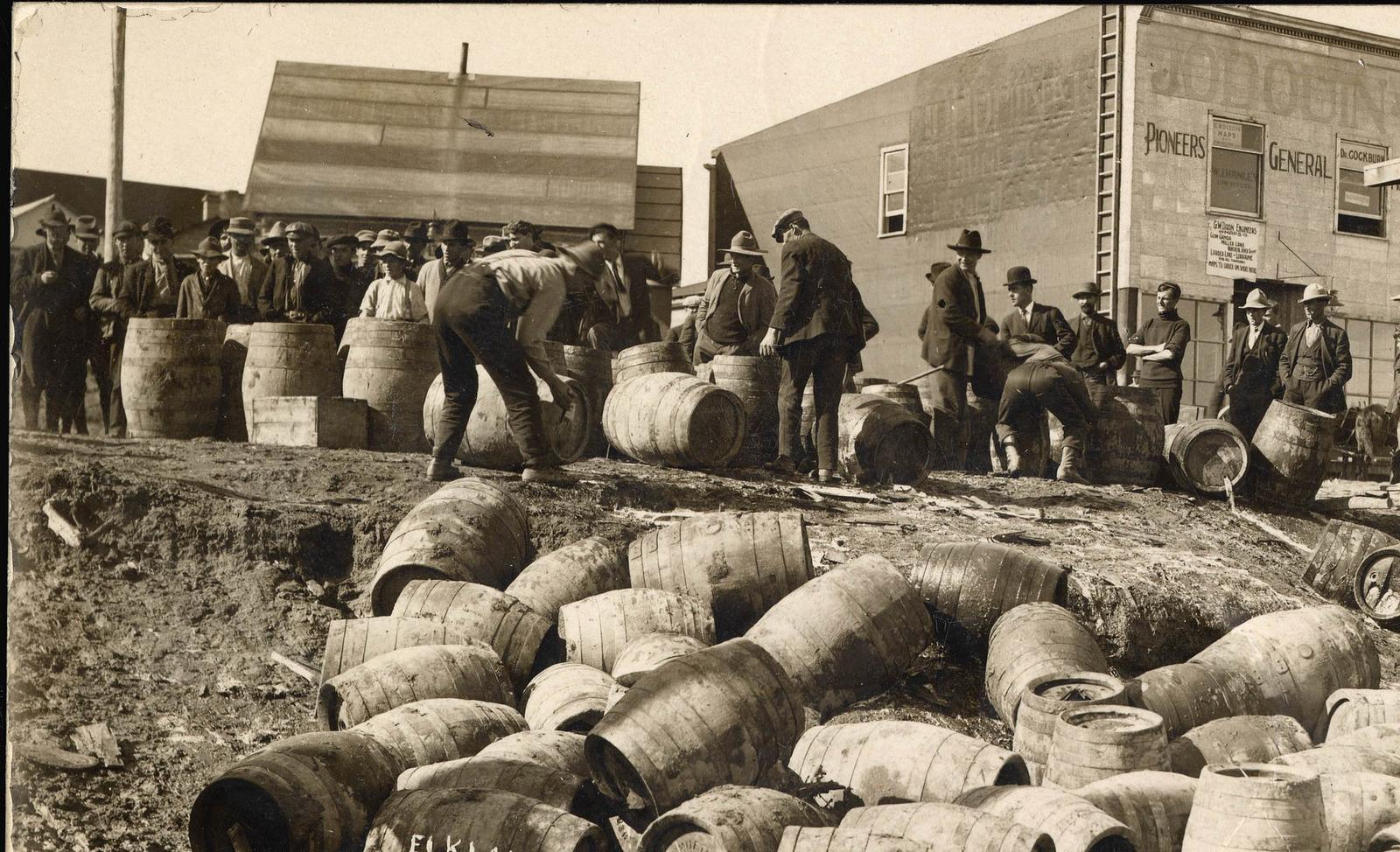
Law enforcement confiscate stores of alcohol in Elk Lake in an effort to enforce prohibition. The prohibition measures were introduced in 1916 and were not repealed until 1927.

Influenced by events in the United States, the government of William Hearst introduced prohibition of alcoholic drinks in 1916 with the passing of the Ontario Temperance Act. However, residents could distil and retain their own personal supply, and liquor producers could continue distillation and export for sale, allowing this already sizeable industry to strengthen further. Ontario became a hotbed for the illegal smuggling of liquor and the biggest supplier into the United States, which was under complete prohibition. Prohibition in Ontario came to an end in 1927 with the establishment of the Liquor Control Board of Ontario under the government of Howard Ferguson. The sale and consumption of liquor, wine, and beer are still controlled by some of the most extreme laws in North America to ensure strict community standards and revenue generation from the alcohol retail monopoly are upheld.

The post-World War II period was one of exceptional prosperity and growth. Ontario has been the recipients of most immigration to Canada, largely immigrants from war-torn Europe in the 1950s and 1960s and following changes in federal immigration law, a massive influx of non-Europeans since the 1970s. From a largely ethnically British province, Ontario has rapidly become culturally very diverse.

The nationalist movement in Quebec, particularly after the election of the Parti Québécois in 1976, contributed to driving many businesses and English-speaking people out of Quebec to Ontario, and as a result, Toronto surpassed Montreal as the largest city and economic centre of Canada. Depressed economic conditions in the Maritime Provinces have also resulted in de-population of those provinces in the 20th century, with heavy migration into Ontario.

Ontario's official language is English, although there exists a number of French-speaking communities across Ontario. French-language services are made available for communities with a sizeable French-speaking population; a service that is ensured under the French Language Services Act of 1989.

== Demographics ==
Population density of Ontario

Historical populations
Year	Pop.	±%
1851	952,004	—
1861	1,396,091	+46.6%
1871	1,620,851	+16.1%
1881	1,926,922	+18.9%
1891	2,114,321	+9.7%
1901	2,182,947	+3.2%
1911	2,527,292	+15.8%
1921	2,933,662	+16.1%
1931	3,431,683	+17.0%
1941	3,787,655	+10.4%
1951	4,597,542	+21.4%
1956	5,404,933	+17.6%
1961	6,236,092	+15.4%
1966	6,960,870	+11.6%
1971	7,703,105	+10.7%
1976	8,264,465	+7.3%
1981	8,625,107	+4.4%
1986	9,101,695	+5.5%
1991	10,084,885	+10.8%
1996	10,753,573	+6.6%
2001	11,410,046	+6.1%
2006	12,160,282	+6.6%
2011	12,851,821	+5.7%
2016	13,448,494	+4.6%
2021	14,223,942	+5.8%
Source: Statistics Canada

=== Population ===
In the 2021 census, Ontario had a population of 14,223,942 living in 5,491,201 of its 5,929,250 total dwellings, a 5.8 per cent change from its 2016 population of 13,448,494. With a land area of 892,411.76 square kilometres (344,562.11 square miles), it had a population density of 15.9/km^{2} (41.3/sq mi) in 2021. The largest population centres in Ontario are Toronto, Ottawa, Hamilton, Kitchener, London and Oshawa, which all have more than 300,000 inhabitants.

=== Ethnicity ===
The percentages given below add to more than 100%, because of dual responses (e.g., "French and Canadian" response generates an entry both in the category "French Canadian" and in the category "Canadian").

The majority of Ontarians are of English or other European descent including large Scottish, Irish and Italian communities. Slightly less than 5% of the population of Ontario is Franco-Ontarian, that is those whose native tongue is French, although those with French ancestry account for 11% of the population. Compared to natural increase or interprovincial migration, immigration is a huge population growth force in Ontario, as it has been over the last two centuries. More recent sources of immigrants with large or growing communities in Ontario include East Asians, South Asians, Caribbeans, Latin Americans, Europeans, and Africans. Most populations have settled in the larger urban centres.

=== Visible minorities and Indigenous peoples ===
In 2021, 34.3% of the population consisted of visible minorities and 2.9% of the population was Indigenous, mostly of First Nations and Métis descent. There was also a small number of Inuit in the province. The number of Indigenous people and visible minorities has been increasing at a faster rate than the general population of Ontario.

Visible minority and Indigenous population (Canada 2021 Census)
Population group		Population	%
European (Note: Statistic includes all persons that did not make up part of a visible minority or an indigenous identity.)		8,807,805	62.8%
Visible minority group	South Asian	1,515,295	10.8%
Visible minority group	Chinese	820,245	5.8%
Visible minority group	Black	768,740	5.5%
Visible minority group	Filipino	363,650	2.6%
Visible minority group	Arab	284,215	2.0%
Visible minority group	Latin American	249,190	1.8%
Visible minority group	Southeast Asian	167,845	1.2%
Visible minority group	West Asian	212,185	1.5%
Visible minority group	Korean	99,425	0.7%
Visible minority group	Japanese	31,420	0.2%
Visible minority group	Visible minority, n.i.e.	124,120	0.9%
Visible minority group	Multiple visible minorities	181,025	1.3%
Total visible minority population		4,817,360	34.3%
Indigenous group	First Nations (North American Indian)	251,030	1.8%
Indigenous group	Métis	134,615	1.0%
Indigenous group	Inuk (Inuit)	4,310	0.0%
Indigenous group	Multiple Indigenous responses	7,115	0.1%
Indigenous group	Indigenous responses n.i.e.	9,515	0.1%
Total Indigenous population		406,585	2.9%
'Total population'		'14,031,750'	'100.0%'

=== Religion ===
In 2021, 52.1% of the population was Christian, with the largest religious denominations being the Roman Catholic Church (with 26.0% of the population) and the United Church of Canada with (4.1%). Other religions included Islam (6.7%), Hinduism (4.1%). 31.6% of Ontarians had no religious affiliation.

The major religious groups in Ontario in 2021 were:

Religion	People	%
Total	14,031,750	100
No religious affiliation	4,433,675	31.6
Catholic	3,654,825	26.0
Protestant	2,187,685	15.6
Other Christians	1,143,450	8.15
Muslim	942,990	6.7
Hindu	573,700	4.1
Christian Orthodox	329,850	2.35
Sikh	300,435	2.1
Jewish	196,100	1.4
Buddhist	164,215	1.2
Other religions	104,830	0.7

In Ontario, Catholics are represented by the Assembly of Catholic Bishops of Ontario and the Anglicans by the Ecclesiastical Province of Ontario.

=== Language ===
Map of French language ability according to the 2021 census.

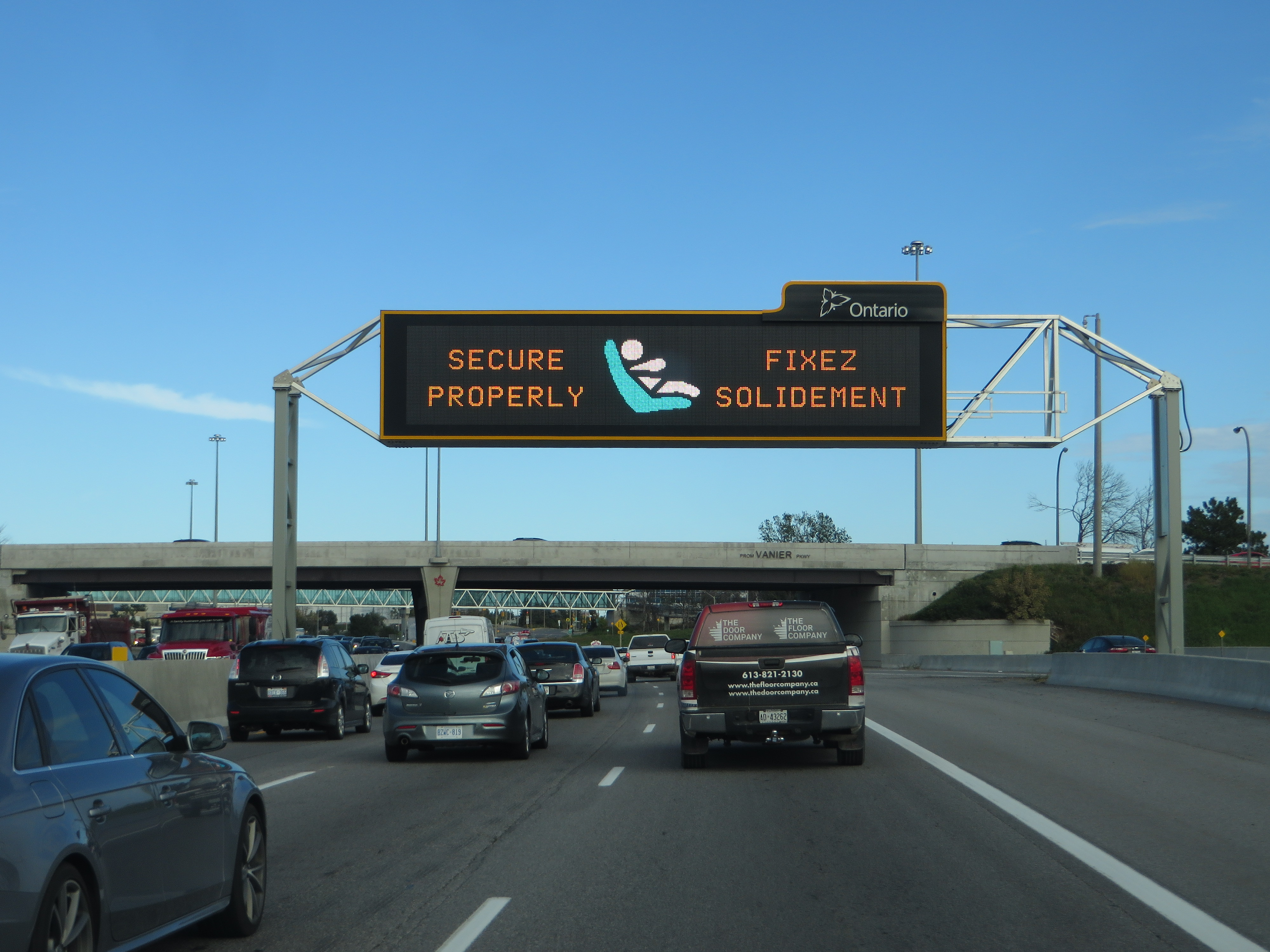
English and French displayed on a gantry sign. Communities with sizeable francophone populations are able to receive provincial services in French.

As of the 2021 Canadian Census, the ten most spoken languages in the province included English (13,650,230 or 97.28%), French (1,550,545 or 11.05%), Mandarin (467,420 or 3.33%), Hindi (436,125 or 3.11%), Spanish (401,205 or 2.86%), Punjabi (397,865 or 2.84%), Cantonese (352,135 or 2.51%), Arabic (342,860 or 2.44%), Italian (312,800 or 2.23%), and Urdu (295,175 or 2.1%). (Note: The question on knowledge of languages allows for multiple responses.)

The principal language of Ontario is English, the province's de facto official language, with approximately 97.2% of Ontarians having proficiency in the language, although only 69.5% of Ontarians reported English as their mother tongue in the 2016 Census. English is one of two official languages of Canada, with the other being French. English and French are the official languages of the courts in Ontario. Approximately 4.6% of the population identified as francophone, (Note: The following figure is taken from the province's "Inclusive Definition of Francophones", (IDF) which includes those whose mother tongue is French, and those whose mother tongue is not French, but have proficiency in the language, and use French as the primary language at home.) and a total of 11.5% of Ontarians reported having proficiency in French. Approximately 11.2% of Ontarians reported being bilingual in both English and French. Approximately 2.5% of Ontarians have no proficiency in either English or French.

Franco-Ontarians are concentrated in the northeastern, eastern, and extreme southern parts of the province, where under the French Language Services Act, provincial government services are required to be available in French if at least 10% of a designated area's population report French as their native language or if an urban centre has at least 5,000 francophones. The text of the act reads: "[...]and whereas in Ontario the French language is recognized as an official language in the courts and in education[...]"

Other languages spoken by residents include Arabic, Bengali, Cantonese, Dutch, German, Greek, Gujarati, Hindi, Hebrew, Italian, Korean, Malayalam, Mandarin, Marathi, Persian, Polish, Portuguese, Punjabi, Russian, Sinhalese, Somali, Spanish, Tagalog, Telugu, Tamil, Tibetan, Ukrainian, Urdu, and Vietnamese.

== Economy ==
Ontario is Canada's leading manufacturing province, accounting for 52% of the total national manufacturing shipments in 2004. Ontario's largest trading partner is the American state of Michigan. In April 2012, Moody's bond-rating agency rated Ontario debt at AA2/stable, while S&P rated it AA−. Dominion Bond Rating Service rated it AA(low) in January 2013. Long known as a bastion of Canadian manufacturing and financial solvency, Ontario's public debt-to-GDP ratio is projected to be 38.4% in fiscal year 2023–2024.

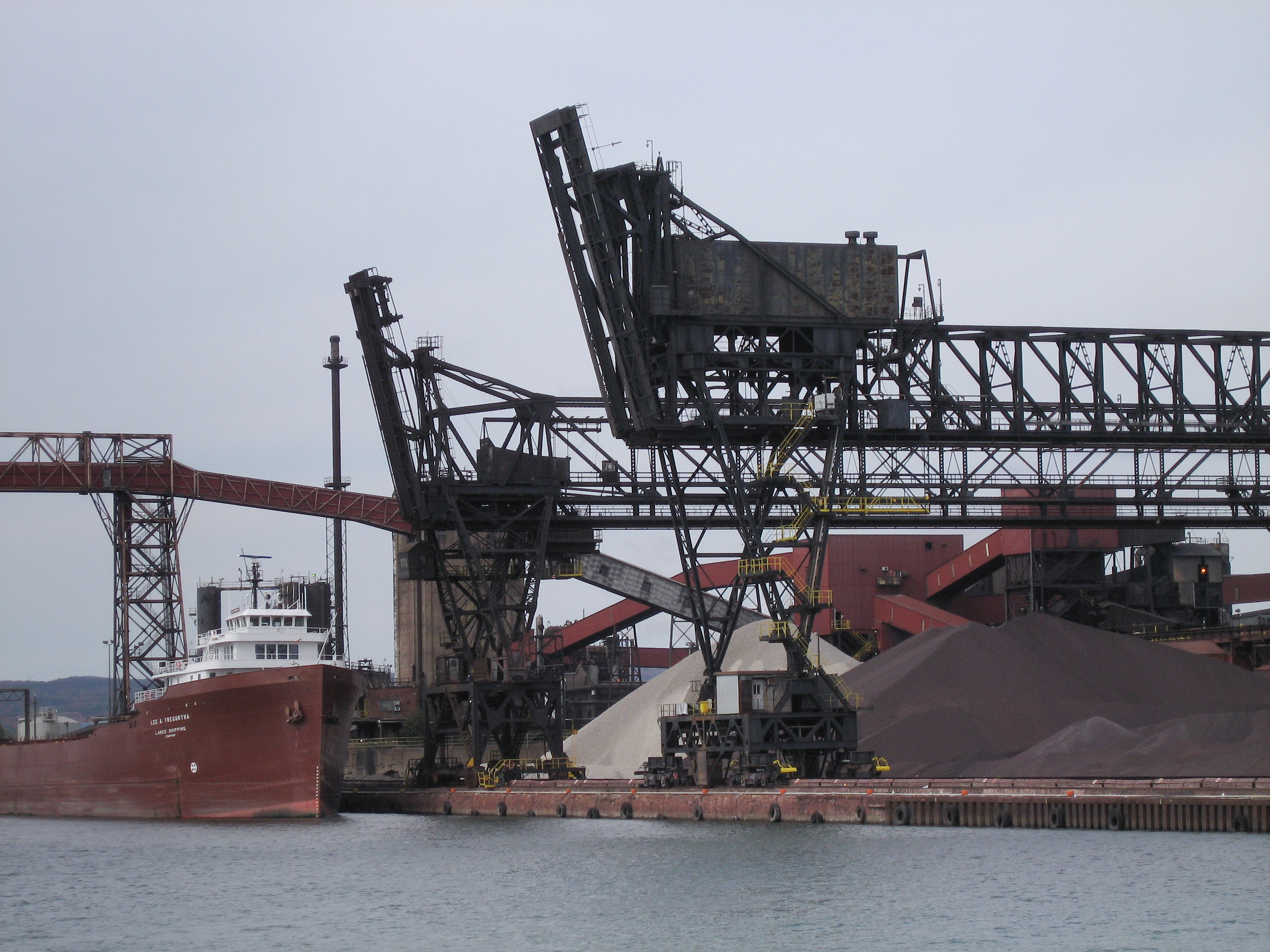
Container ship at Algoma Steel. The Great Lakes provide ocean access for industries in the province's interior.

Mining and the forest products industry, notably pulp and paper, are vital to the economy of Northern Ontario. As of 2011, roughly 200,000 ha are clearcut each year; herbicides for hardwood suppression are applied to a third of the total. There has been controversy over the Ring of Fire mineral deposit, and whether the province can afford to spend CAD$2.25 billion on a road from the Trans-Canada Highway near Kenora to the deposit, currently valued at CAD$60 billion.

An abundance of natural resources, excellent transportation links to the North American heartland and the inland Great Lakes making ocean access possible via container ships, have all contributed to making manufacturing the principal industry of the province, found mainly in the Golden Horseshoe region, which is the largest industrialized area in Canada, the southern end of the region being part of the North American Rust Belt. Important products include motor vehicles, iron, steel, food, electrical appliances, machinery, chemicals, and paper.

Hamilton is the largest steel manufacturing city in Canada followed closely by Sault Ste. Marie, and Sarnia is the centre for petrochemical production. Construction employed more than 6.5% of the province's work force in June 2011. Ontario's steel industry was once centred in Hamilton; Hamilton Harbour, which can be seen from the QEW Skyway bridge, is an industrial wasteland; U.S. Steel-owned Stelco announced in the autumn of 2013 that it would close in 2014, with the loss of 875 jobs. The move flummoxed a union representative, who seemed puzzled why a plant with capacity of 2 million tonnes per annum would be shut while Canada imported 8 million tonnes of steel the previous year. Algoma Steel maintains a plant in Sault Ste Marie.

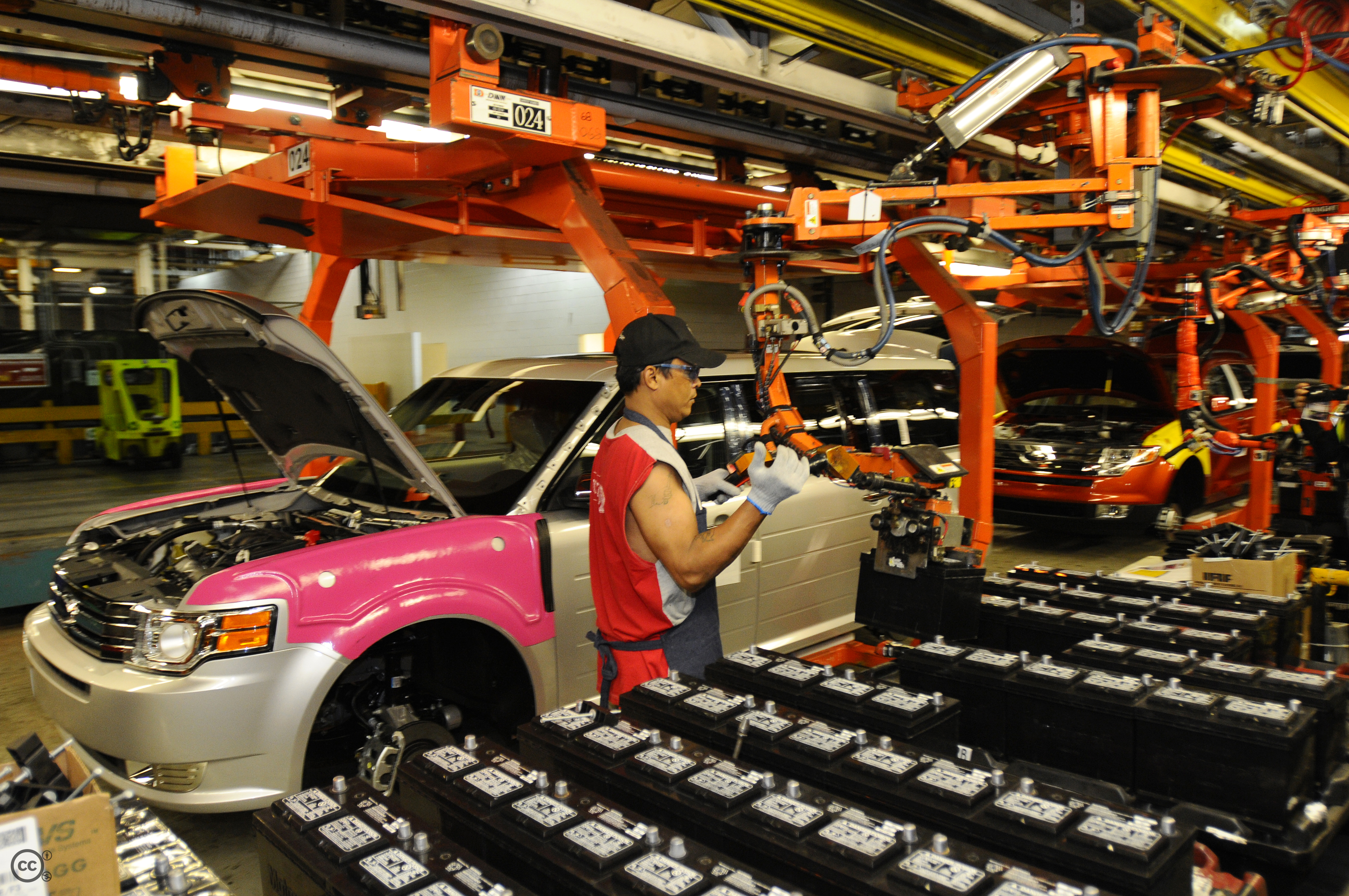
A worker at the Oakville Assembly installs a battery in an automobile. The automotive industry is a contributor to the economy of Ontario.

Ontario surpassed Michigan in car production, assembling more than 2,696,000 vehicles in 2004. Ontario has Chrysler plants in Windsor and Bramalea, two General Motor (GM) plants in Oshawa and one in Ingersoll, a Honda assembly plant in Alliston, Ford Motor Company (Ford) plants in Oakville and St. Thomas and Toyota assembly plants in Cambridge and Woodstock. However, as a result of steeply declining sales, in 2005, GM announced massive layoffs at production facilities across North America, including two large GM plants in Oshawa and a drive train facility in St. Catharines, that resulted in 8,000 job losses in Ontario alone. In 2006, Ford announced between 25,000 and 30,000 layoffs phased until 2012; Ontario was spared the worst, but job losses were announced for the St Thomas facility and the Windsor Casting plant. However, these losses will be offset by Ford's recent announcement of a hybrid vehicle facility slated to begin production in 2007 at its Oakville plant and GM's re-introduction of the Camaro which will be produced in Oshawa. In December 2008, Toyota announced the grand opening of the Toyota RAV4 plant in Woodstock, and Honda also plans to add an engine plant at its facility in Alliston. Despite these new plants coming online, Ontario has not yet fully recovered following massive layoffs during the Great Recession; its unemployment rate was 7.3% in May 2013, compared to 8.7% in January 2010 and approximately 6% in 2007. In September 2013, the Ontario government committed CA$70.9 million to the Ford plant in Oakville, while the federal government committed CAD$71.1mn, to secure 2,800 jobs. The province has lost 300,000 manufacturing jobs in the decade from 2003, and the Bank of Canada noted that "while the energy and mining industries have benefitted from these movements, the pressure on the manufacturing sector has intensified, since many firms in this sector were already dealing with growing competition from low-cost economies such as China."

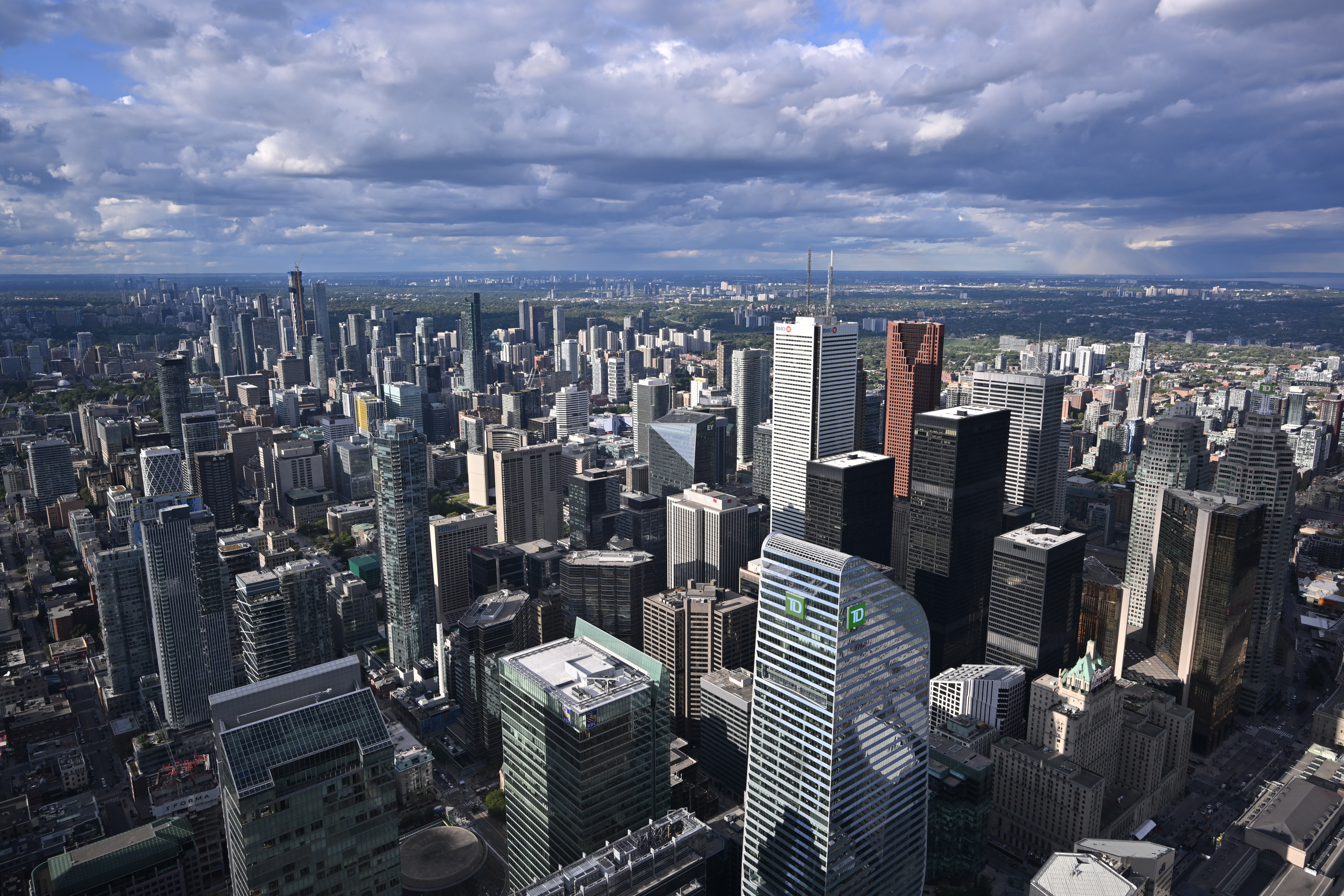
Toronto's Financial District serves as the centre for Canada's financial services.

Toronto, and more broadly the Greater Toronto Area is a commercial, distribution, financial and industrial centre. It is the centre of Canada's financial sector, including insurance and banking services. Neighbouring cities are home to product distribution, IT centres, and manufacturing industries. Canada's Federal Government is the largest single employer in the National Capital Region, which centres on the border cities of Ontario's Ottawa, and Quebec's Gatineau.

The information technology sector is important, particularly in the Silicon Valley North section of Ottawa, home to Canada's largest technology park. IT is also important in the Waterloo Region, where the headquarters of BlackBerry is located.

Tourism contributes heavily to the economy of Central Ontario, peaking during the summer months owing to the abundance of fresh water recreation and wilderness found there in reasonable proximity to the major urban centres. At other times of the year, hunting, skiing and snowmobiling are popular. This region has some of the most vibrant fall colour displays anywhere on the continent, and tours directed at overseas visitors are organized to see them. Tourism also plays a key role in border cities with large casinos, among them Windsor, Cornwall, Sarnia and Niagara Falls, the latter of which attracts millions of US and other international visitors.

=== Agriculture ===
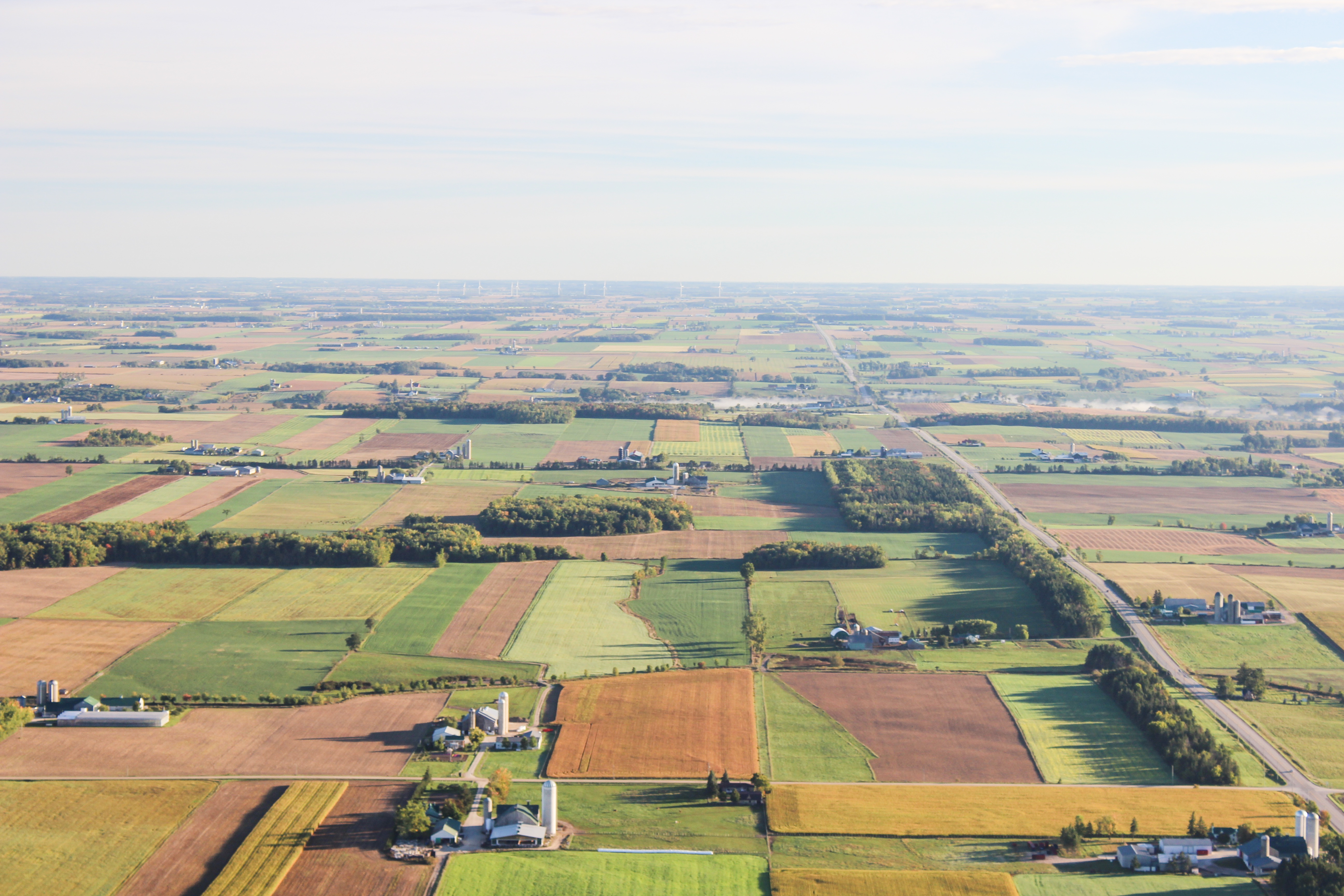
Aerial view of farms in Waterloo. A significant portion of the land in Southern Ontario is used as farmland.

Once the dominant industry, agriculture now uses a small percentage of the workforce. Massey Ferguson, a farm-implement manufacturer, was originally founded in the province in 1847, before eventually expanding internationally. As the following table shows, while the number of individual farms has steadily decreased and their overall size has shrunk at a lower rate, greater mechanization has supported increased supply to satisfy the ever-increasing demands of a growing population base; this has also meant a gradual increase in the total amount of land used for growing crops.

Ontario Farming		1986	1991	1996	2001	2006
Number of Farms		72,713	68,633	67,520	59,728	57,211
Total	Hectares	5,646,582	5,451,379	5,616,860	5,466,233	5,386,453
Total	Acres	13,953,009	13,470,652	13,879,565	13,507,358	13,310,217
Planted; Crops	Hectares	3,457,966	3,411,667	3,544,927	3,656,705	3,660,941
Planted; Crops	Acres	8,544,821	8,430,438	8,759,707	9,035,916	9,046,383
Source: Statistics Canada, Census of Agriculture.

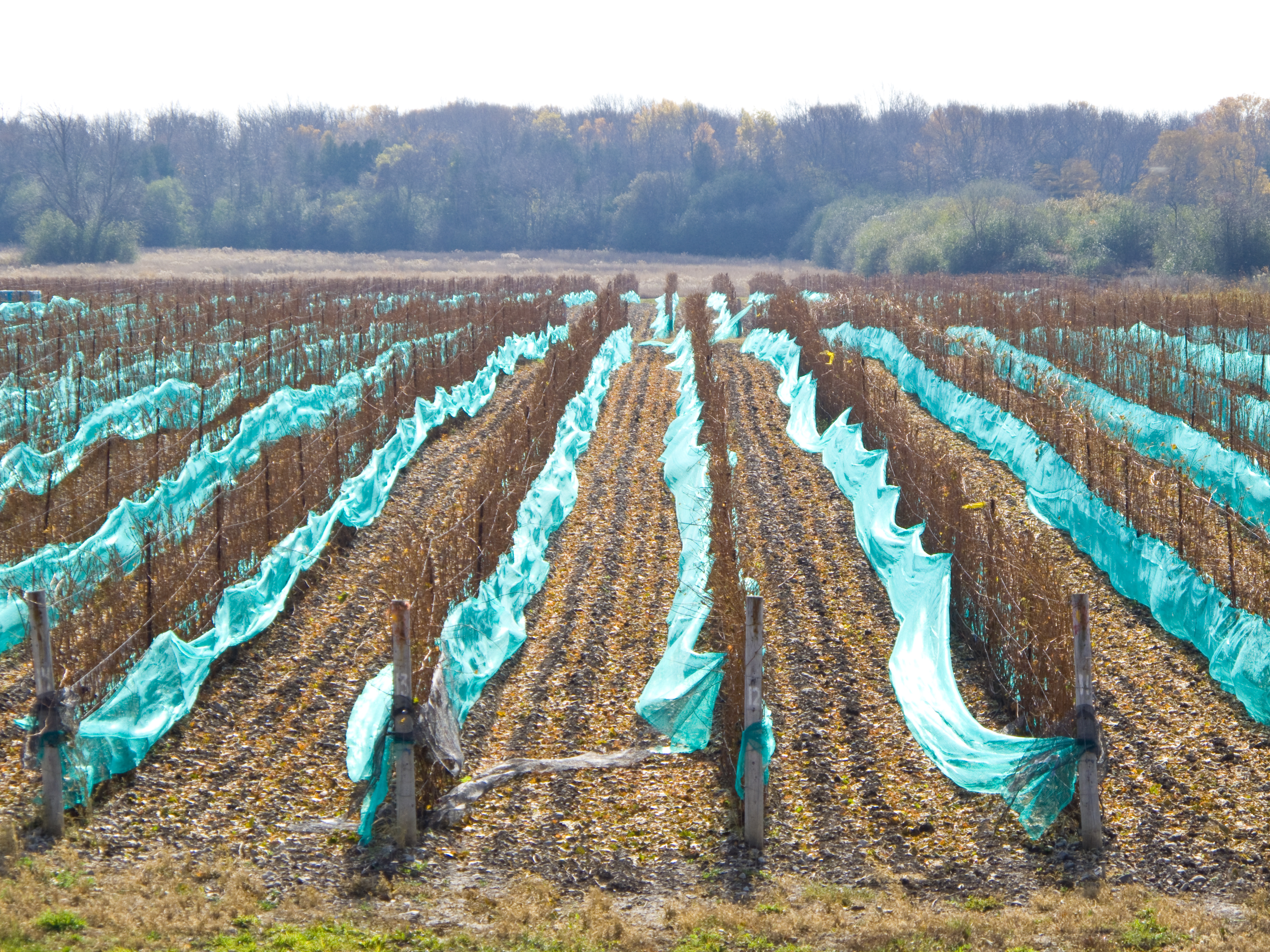
Vineyard, Prince Edward County

Common types of farms reported in the 2001 census include those for cattle, small grains and dairy. The fruit- and wine industry is primarily on the Niagara Peninsula, Prince Edward County, and along the northern shore of Lake Erie, where tobacco farms are also situated. Market vegetables grow in the rich soils of the Holland Marsh near Newmarket. The area near Windsor is also very fertile.

The area defined as the Corn Belt covers much of the southwestern area of the province, extending as far north as close to Goderich, but corn and soy are grown throughout the southern portion of the province. Apple orchards are a common sight along the southern shore of Nottawasaga Bay (part of Georgian Bay) near Collingwood and along the northern shore of Lake Ontario near Cobourg. Tobacco production, centred in Norfolk County, has decreased, allowing an increase in alternative crops such as hazelnuts and ginseng. Southern Ontario's limited supply of agricultural land is going out of production at an increasing rate. Urban sprawl and farmland severances contribute to the loss of thousands of acres of productive agricultural land in Ontario each year. Over 2,000 farms and 150,000 acres (61,000 ha) of farmland in the GTA alone were lost to production in the two decades between 1976 and 1996. This loss represented approximately 18%". of Ontario's Class 1 farmland being converted to urban purposes. In addition, increasing rural severances provide ever-greater interference with agricultural production. In an effort to protect the farmland and green spaces of the National Capital Region, and Greater Toronto Area, the Federal and Provincial Governments introduced greenbelts around Ottawa and the Golden Horseshoe, limiting urban development in these areas.

=== Energy ===
Ontario's rivers make it rich in hydroelectric energy. In 2009, Ontario Power Generation generated 70% of the province's electricity, of which 51% is nuclear, 39% is hydroelectric and 10% is fossil-fuel derived. By 2025, nuclear power is projected to supply 42%, while fossil-fuel-derived generation is projected to decrease slightly over the next 20 years. Much of the newer power generation coming online in the last few years is natural gas or combined-cycle natural gas plants. OPG is not, however, responsible for the transmission of power, which is under the control of Hydro One.

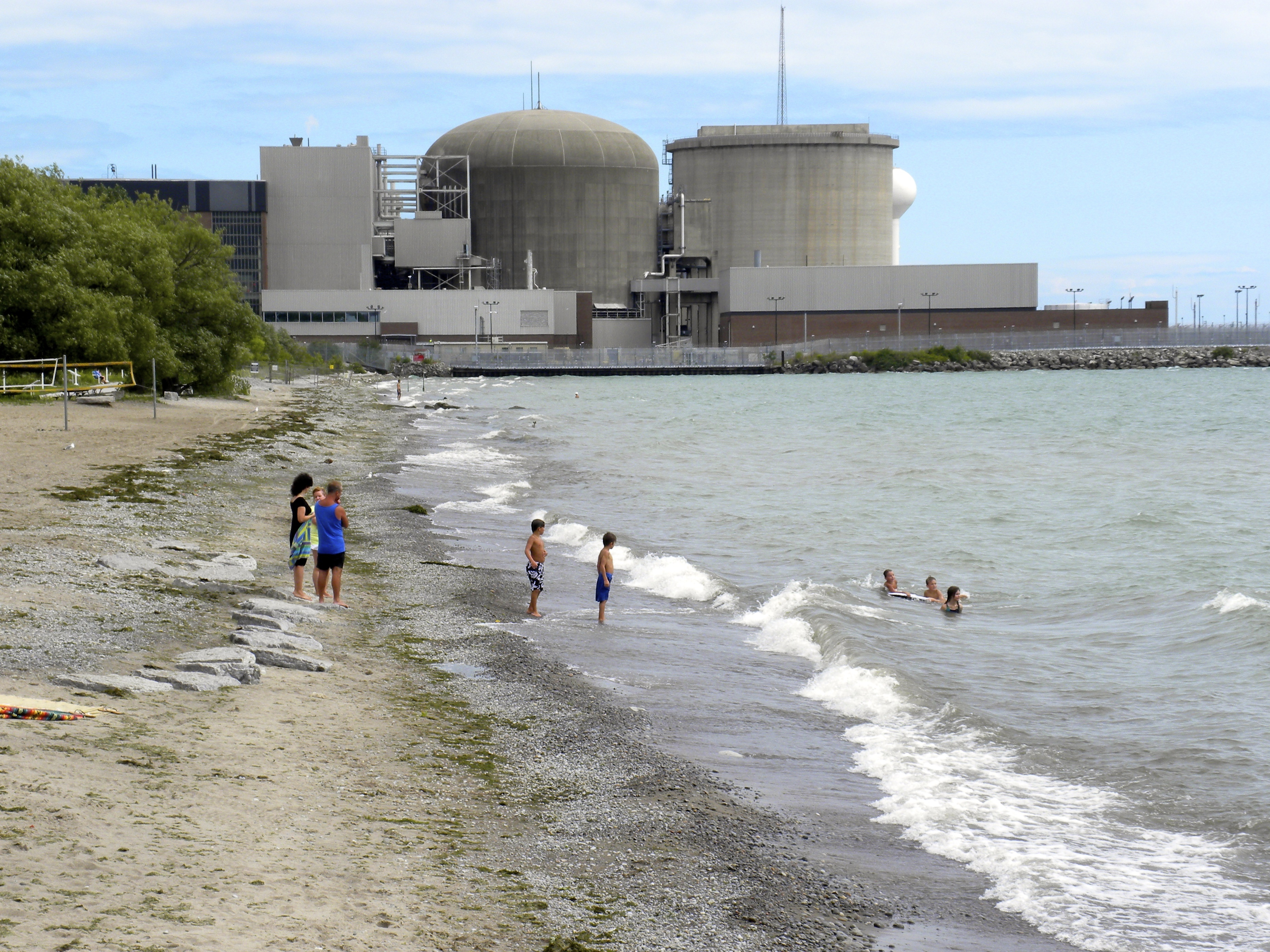
The Pickering Nuclear Generating Station is one of three nuclear power stations in Ontario.

Despite its diverse range of power options, problems related to increasing consumption, lack of energy efficiency and ageing nuclear reactors, Ontario has been forced in recent years to purchase power from its neighbours Quebec and Michigan to supplement its power needs during peak consumption periods. Ontario's basic domestic rate in 2010 was 11.17 cents per kWh; by contrast. Quebec's was 6.81. In December 2013, the government projected a 42% hike by 2018, and 68% by 2033. Industrial rates are projected to rise by 33% by 2018, and 55% in 2033.

The Green Energy and Green Economy Act, 2009 (GEA), takes a two-pronged approach to commercializing renewable energy; first, it aims to bring more renewable energy sources to the province; and secondly, it aims to adopt more energy-efficiency measures to help conserve energy. The bill envisaged appointing a Renewable Energy Facilitator to provide "one-window" assistance and support to project developers to facilitate project approvals.

The approvals process for transmission projects would also be streamlined and (for the first time in Ontario) the bill would enact standards for renewable energy projects. Homeowners would have access to incentives to develop small-scale renewables such as low- or no-interest loans to finance the capital cost of renewable energy generating facilities like solar panels.

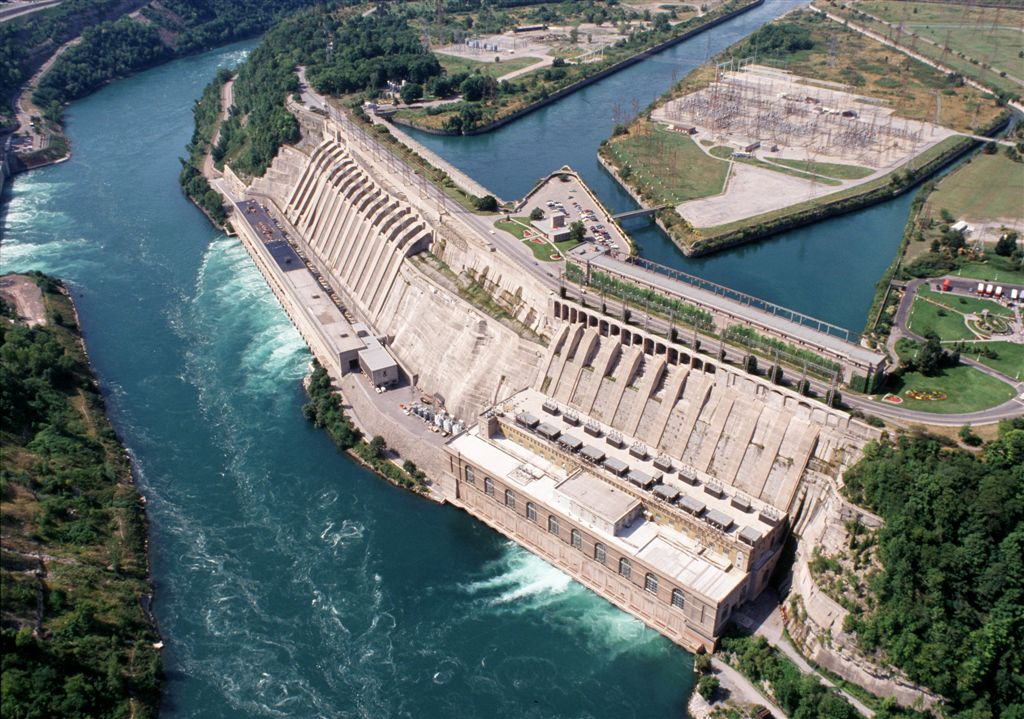
The Sir Adam Beck Hydroelectric Generating Stations are hydroelectric plants located in Niagara Falls.

Much of Ontario's electricity is generated in Niagara Falls. The Bruce Nuclear Generating Station, the second largest operational nuclear power plant in the world, is also in Ontario and uses eight CANDU reactors to generate electricity for the province.

Ontario had the most wind energy capacity of the country with 4,900 MW of power (41% of Canada's capacity).

== Government, law and politics ==
The British North America Act, 1867 section 69 stipulated "There shall be a Legislature for Ontario consisting of the Lieutenant Governor and of One House, styled the Legislative Assembly of Ontario." The assembly currently has 124 seats (increased from 107 as of the 42nd Ontario general election) representing ridings elected in a first-past-the-post voting system across the province.

The legislative buildings at Queen's Park are the seat of government. Following the Westminster system, the leader of the party holding the most seats in the assembly is known as the "Premier and President of the Council" (Executive Council Act R.S.O. 1990). The Premier chooses the cabinet or Executive Council whose members are deemed ministers of the Crown.

Although the Legislative Assembly Act (R.S.O. 1990) refers to "members of the assembly" in English and députés à l'Assemblée in French, the legislators are now commonly called MPPs (Members of the Provincial Parliament) in English, but they have also been called MLAs (Members of the Legislative Assembly); both are acceptable but the latter is uncommon. The title of Prime Minister of Ontario, correct in French (le Premier ministre), is permissible in English but now generally avoided in favour of the title "Premier" to avoid confusion with the Prime Minister of Canada.

=== Law ===
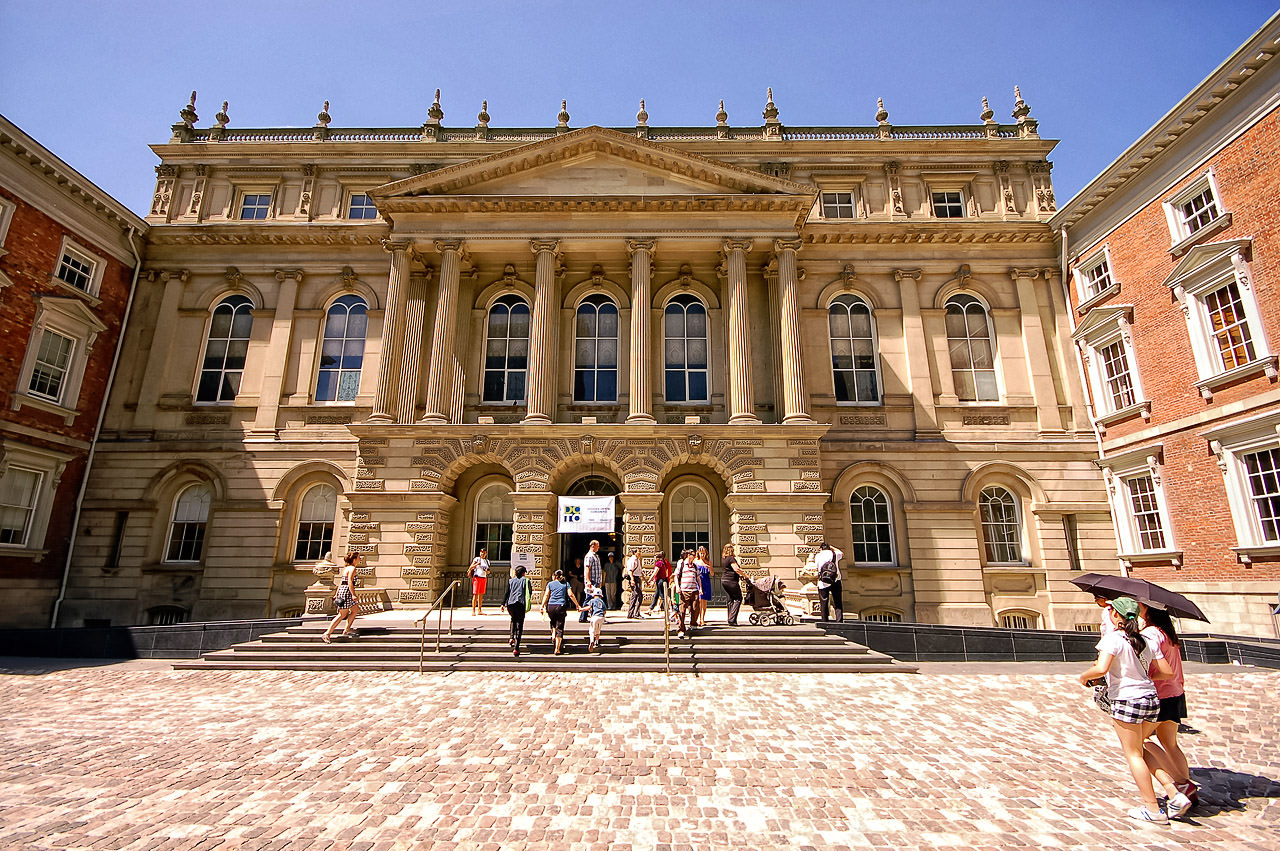
Osgoode Hall houses the Court of Appeal for Ontario, the appellate court for the province.

Ontario has grown, from its roots in Upper Canada, into a modern jurisdiction. The old titles of the chief law officers, the Attorney-General and the Solicitor-General, remain in use. They both are responsible to the Legislature. The Attorney-General draughts the laws and is responsible for criminal prosecutions and the administration of justice, while the Solicitor-General is responsible for law enforcement and the police services of the province. The Municipal Act is the main statute governing the creation, administration and government of municipalities in the Canadian province of Ontario, other than the City of Toronto. After being passed in 2001, it came into force on January 1, 2003, replacing the previous Municipal Act. Effective January 1, 2007, the Municipal Act (the Act) was significantly amended by the Municipal Statute Law Amendment Act, 2006 (Bill 130).

=== Politics ===
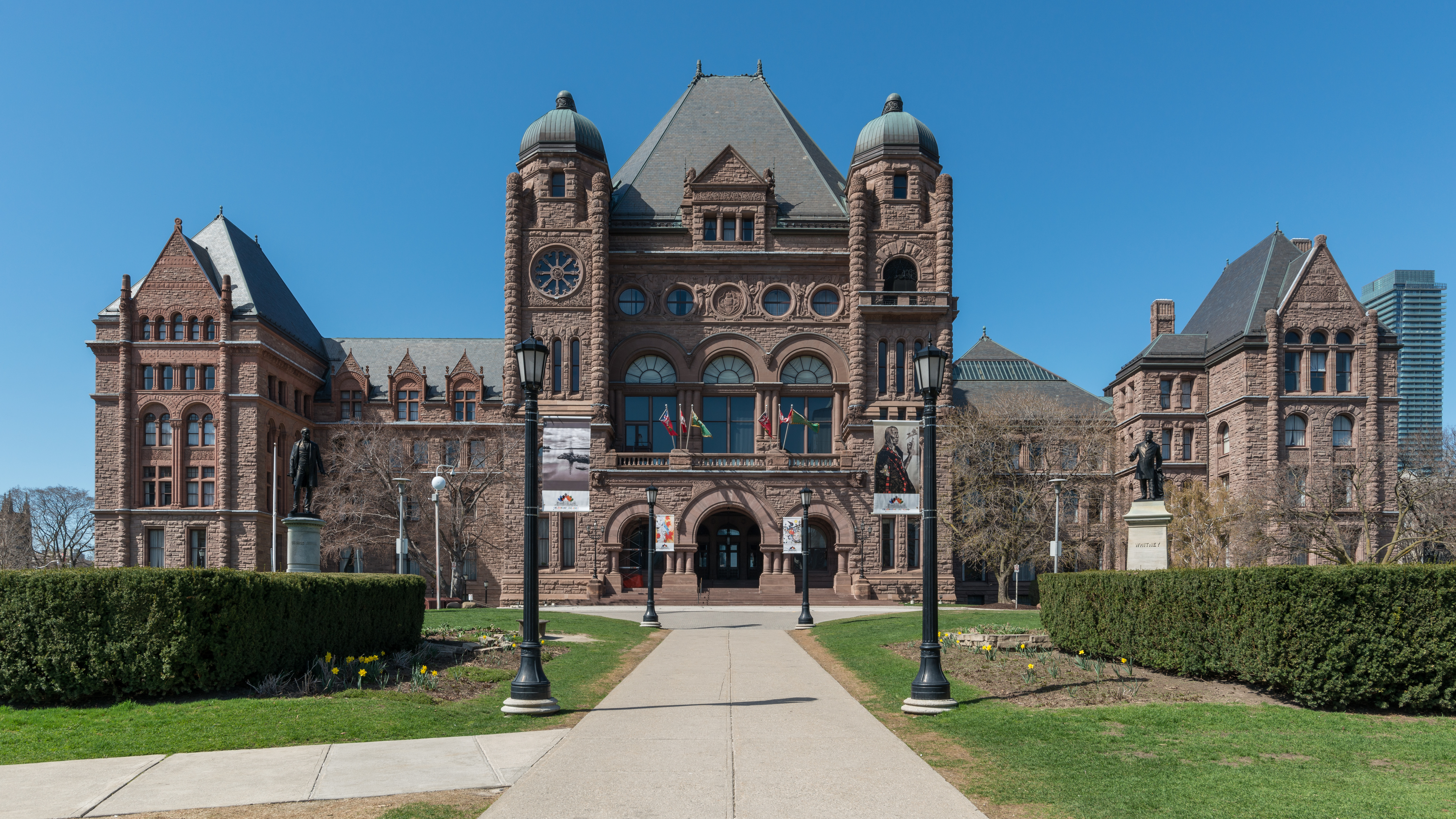
The Ontario Legislative Building at Queen's Park. The building serves as the meeting place for the Legislative Assembly of Ontario.

Ontario has numerous political parties which run for election. The four main parties are the centre-right Progressive Conservative Party of Ontario, the social democratic Ontario New Democratic Party (NDP), the centre to centre-left Ontario Liberal Party, and Green Party of Ontario. The Progressive Conservatives, Liberals and New Democrats have each governed the province, while the Greens elected their first member to the Legislative Assembly in the 2018 Ontario general election.

The 2018 Ontario general election resulted in a Progressive Conservative majority government under party leader Doug Ford, who was sworn in as Premier on June 29. Ontario NDP leader Andrea Horwath was sworn in as the leader of her Majesty's Loyal Opposition. The PC party under Ford has won two further successive majority governments in 2022 and 2025.

=== Administrative divisions ===
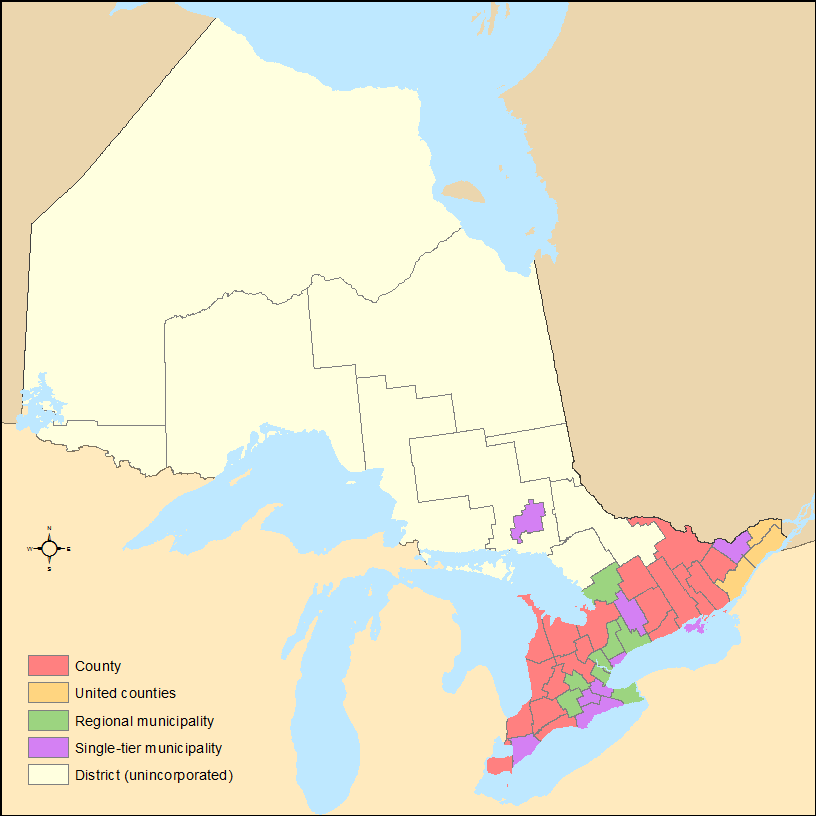
A map of Ontario's counties, regional municipalities, districts, and municipalities.

Ontario has three types of first-level administrative divisions. They include single-tier municipalities, upper-tier municipalities (which may be in the form of either regional municipalities or counties), and districts. Upper-tier municipalities and districts are made up of smaller municipalities and other types of administrative divisions.

Administrative divisions differ primarily in the services that they provide to their residents, with the differing structures of these administrative regions resulting in disparities among Ontario's different regions. The administrative regions of Ontario are roughly coterminous with the census divisions used by Statistics Canada, although some exceptions do exist. (Note: Statistics Canada treats Norfolk County and Haldimand County as one single census division; the County of Brant and City of Brantford are also treated as one single census division. There would otherwise be 51 census divisions instead of the 49 official ones used by Statistics Canada.)

As of 2026, Ontario has 444 municipalities.

=== Urban areas ===
Statistics Canada's measure of a "metro area", the Census Metropolitan Area (CMA), roughly bundles together population figures from the core municipality with those from "commuter" municipalities.

CMA (largest other included municipalities in brackets)	2001	2006	2011	2016	% Change
Toronto CMA (Mississauga, Brampton)	4,682,897	5,113,149	5,583,064	5,928,040	6.2
Ottawa CMA (Gatineau, Clarence-Rockland) *	1,067,800	1,130,761	1,254,919	1,323,783	4.4
Hamilton CMA (Burlington, Grimsby)	662,401	692,911	721,053	747,545	3.7
Kitchener CMA (Cambridge, Waterloo)	414,284	451,235	496,383	523,894	5.5
London CMA (St. Thomas, Strathroy-Caradoc)	435,600	457,720	474,786	494,069	4.1
St. Catharines CMA (Niagara Falls, Welland)	377,009	390,317	392,184	406,074	3.5
Oshawa CMA (Whitby, Clarington)	296,298	330,594	356,177	379,848	6.6
Windsor CMA (Lakeshore, LaSalle)	307,877	323,342	319,246	329,144	3.1
Barrie CMA (Innisfil, Springwater)	148,480	177,061	187,013	197,059	5.4
Sudbury CMA (Whitefish Lake, Wanapitei Reserve)	155,601	158,258	160,770	164,689	1.0
Kingston CMA	146,838	152,358	159,561	161,175	1.0

*Parts of Quebec (including Gatineau) are included in the Ottawa CMA. The population of the Ottawa CMA, in both provinces, is shown. The Ontario portion of the CMA is about 75% of the total population of the CMA.

Ten largest municipalities by population

Municipality	2001	2006	2011	2016	2021
Toronto	2,481,494	2,503,281	2,615,060	2,731,571	2,794,356
Ottawa	774,072	812,129	883,391	934,243	1,017,449
Mississauga	612,925	668,549	713,443	721,599	717,961
Brampton	325,428	433,806	523,911	593,638	656,480
Hamilton	490,268	504,559	519,949	536,917	569,353
London	336,539	352,395	366,151	383,822	422,324
Markham	208,615	261,573	301,709	328,996	338,503
Vaughan	182,022	238,866	288,301	306,233	323,103
Kitchener	190,399	204,668	219,153	233,222	256,885
Windsor	209,218	216,473	210,891	217,188	229,660

== Education ==
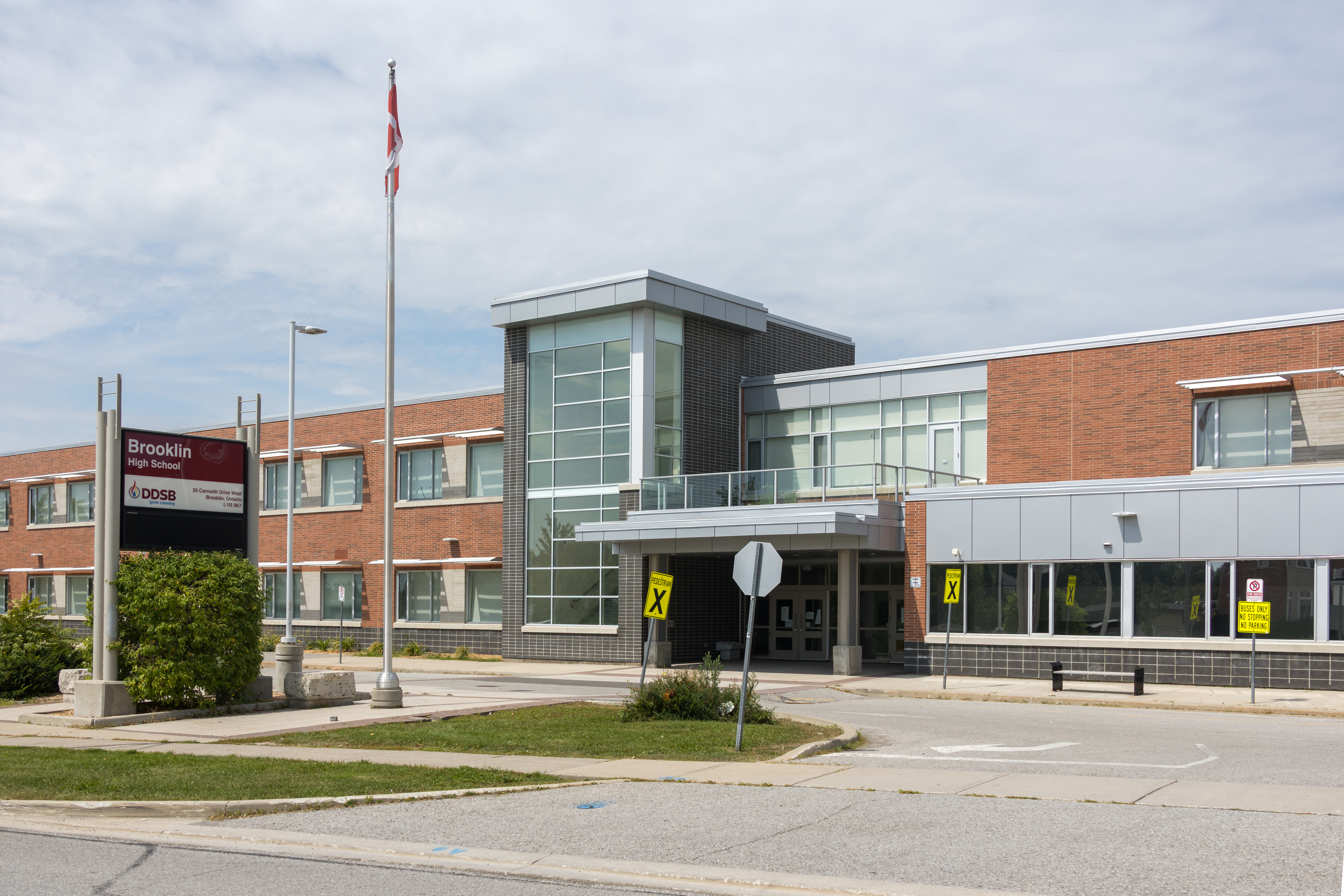
A secondary school in Ontario

Ontario operates four publicly funded school systems, with there being both English and French equivalents of the public school system and the Catholic school system. About half of Ontario's government-funded District School Boards are Catholic, 37 out of 72. There are some publicly funded schools with non-Catholic religious affiliation: these include Eden High School (under the District School Board of Niagara) and the Burkevale Protestant Separate School (under the Penetanguishene Protestant Separate School Board). Legislation regarding primary and secondary level education in Ontario is outlined in the Education Act.

In 2021, two million children were enrolled as students within the province. Elementary schools teach children enrolled in kindergarten and grades 1–8. Secondary schools teach adolescents in grades 9–12. Four and five year olds may enter kindergarten programs, but are not required by law to do so until they turn six that calendar year.

=== Higher education ===
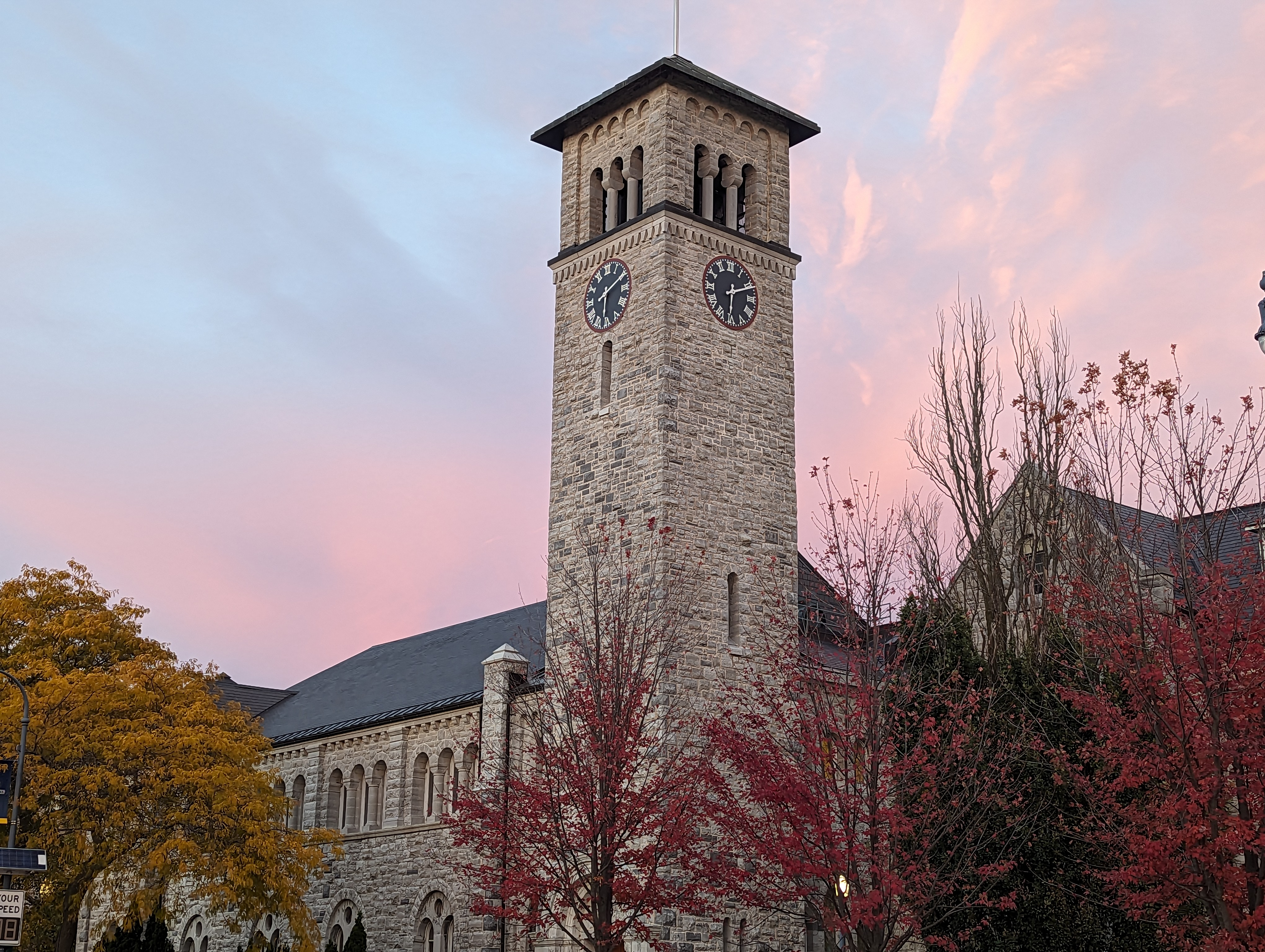
Queen's University

Higher education in Ontario includes postsecondary education and skills training regulated by the Ministry of Colleges and Universities, whose current minister is Jill Dunlop. Recognized institutions include universities, colleges of applied arts and technology, and private career colleges. While there is some overlap between the purpose of universities and colleges in Canada, they generally serve different purposes. Universities place greater emphasis on academics while colleges place greater emphasis on work-integrated learning. Both colleges and universities can offer undergraduate degree programs. There are also programs that involve a partnership between a college and a university. Some students choose to attend college over university because it is the more affordable option.

== Culture ==
Thousand Islands is a cottage country destination on the St. Lawrence River

Numerous regional cultural events and festivals are held in Ontario. Outdoor recreation is common, including fishing and hunting wild game, such as walleye and moose. Having more than 250,000 lakes, including a border on four of the five Great Lakes, with 15% of its surface area covered by water, Ontario is a primary boating destination.

In 2019, the government of Ontario passed legislation that established the Poet Laureate of Ontario.

=== Museums ===
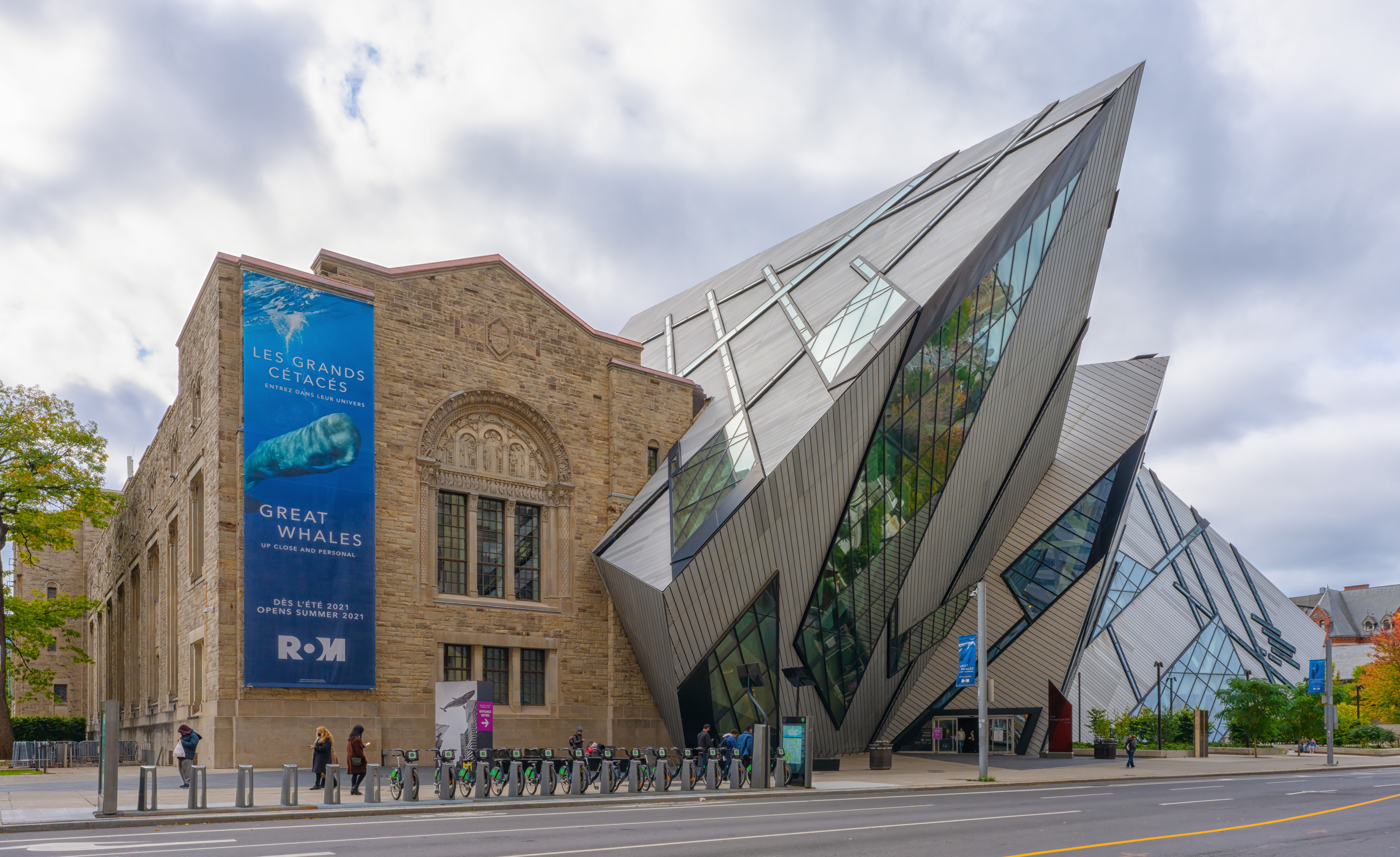
The Royal Ontario Museum in fall of 2021

The largest museum in both Ontario and Canada is the Royal Ontario Museum, located in Toronto and founded in 1912. Receiving over one million visitors each year, it is also Canada's most popular museum. It features 40 exhibits containing "art, culture and nature from around the world." Iconic objects include: Goedo, a Barosaurus, the world's largest faceted cerussite gem, Light of the Desert; four large totem poles, Nisga'a and Haida; and a Neo-Babylonian wall relief, Striding Lion.

Ontario is also home to a number of national museums, due to the location of Ottawa within Ontario. These include, among others, the Canadian War Museum, dedicated to Canada's military history, the Canadian Museum of Nature, dedicated to natural history and the Canada Science and Technology Museum, dedicated to the history of science and technology in Canada.

There are also numerous other smaller, regional museums located in Ontario.

=== Music and arts ===
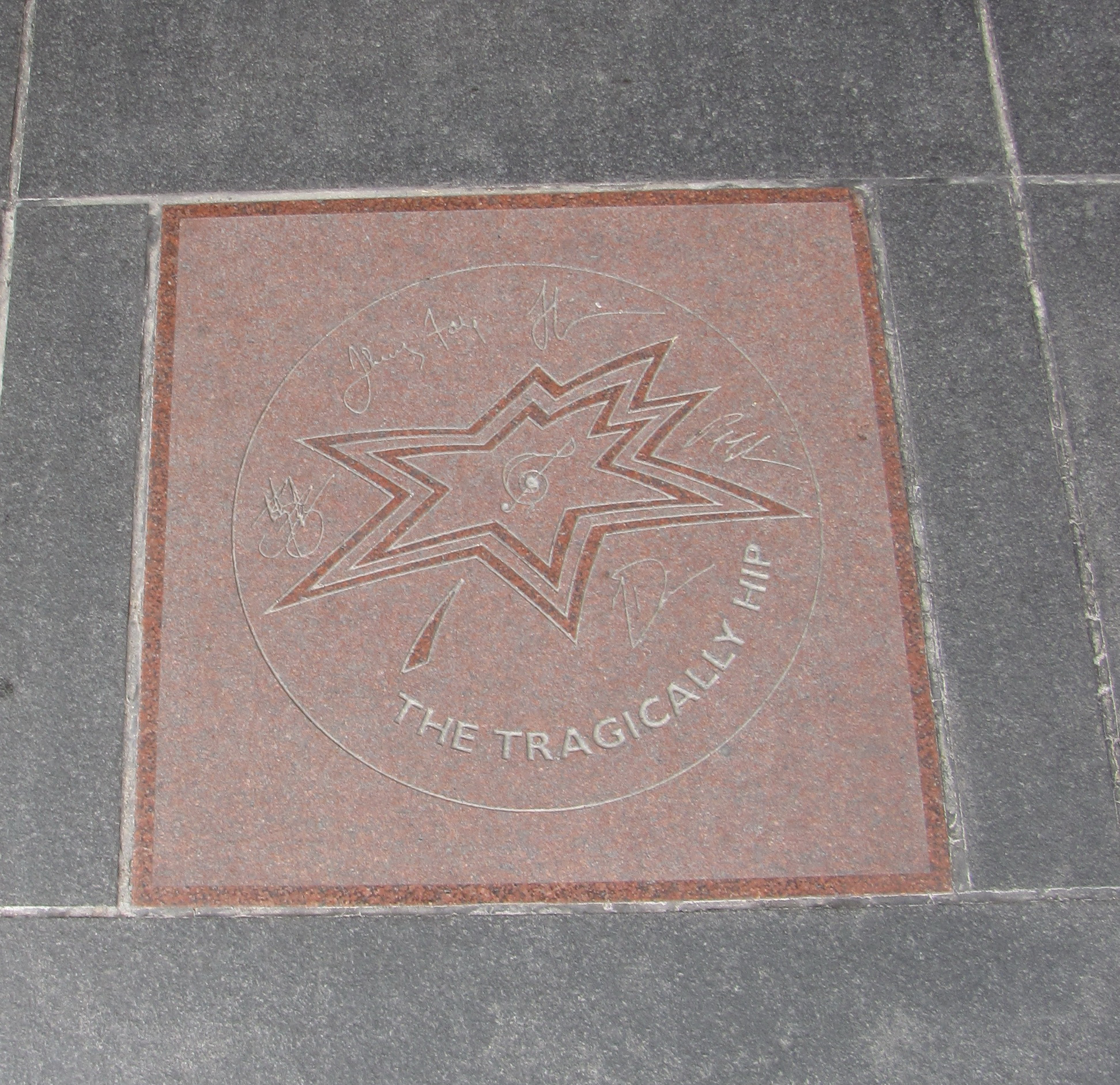
The Tragically Hip star on Canada's Walk of Fame in Toronto

Ontario has a particularly prominent role in Canadian music, notably Toronto, Canada's largest municipality. In classical music, the Toronto Symphony Orchestra, and the National Arts Centre Orchestra are renowned internationally. Many smaller Ontario cities have orchestras of their own as well. The Canadian Opera Company, also based in Toronto, is the country's largest and most influential producer of opera productions. Other institutions in the province include the Royal Conservatory of Music, MuchMusic, National Ballet of Canada and concert venues such as Roy Thomson Hall, Massey Hall, the National Arts Centre, and the Four Seasons Centre.

=== Food ===
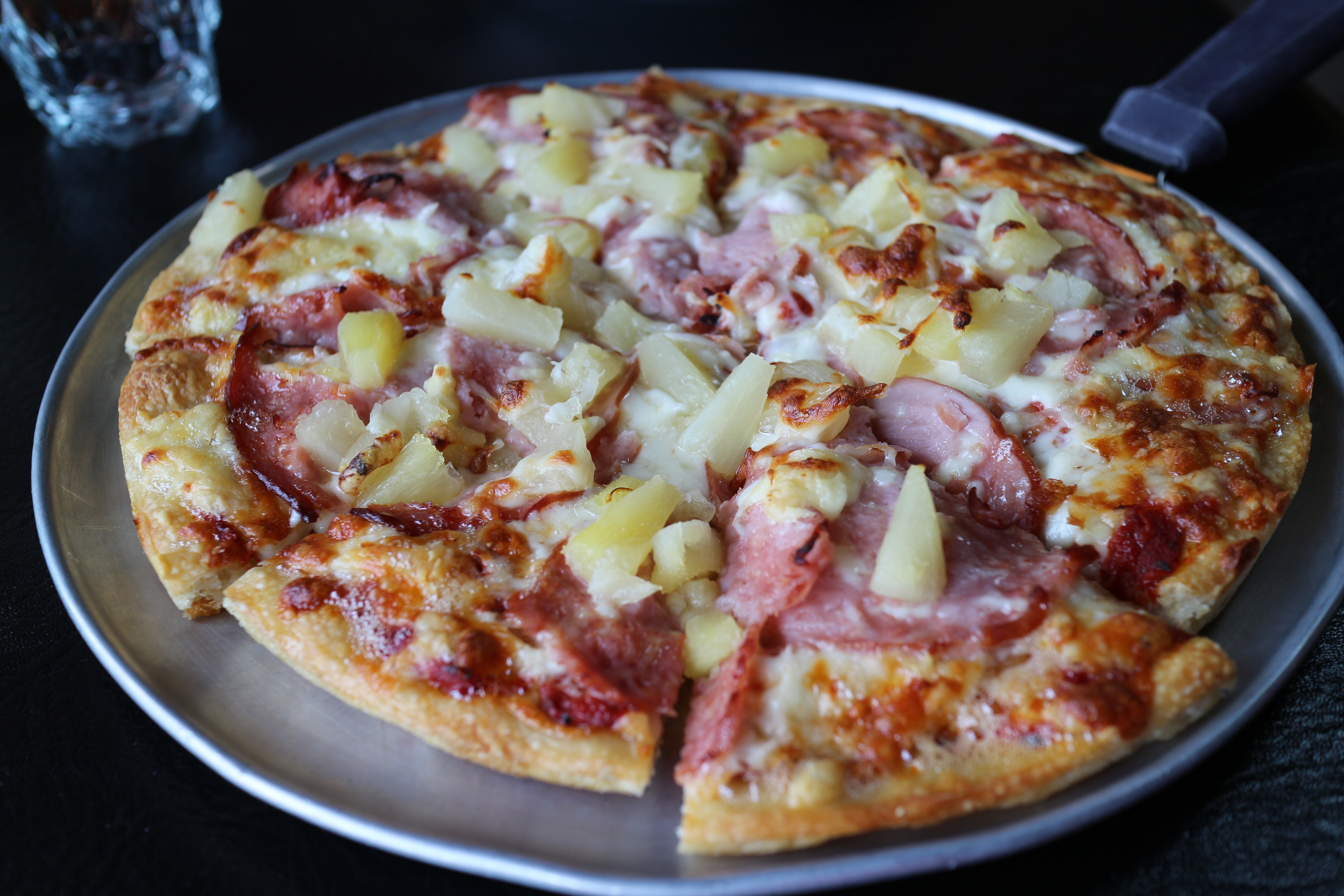
Hawaiian pizza, invented in Ontario c. 1962

Regional dishes native to Ontario include butter tarts, peameal bacon, hawaiian pizza, sushi pizza, windsor-style pizza, beaver tails, dutchies, persian rolls, and Thunder Bay bon bons.

=== Media ===
In 2022, Ontario had 357 newspapers, 32 of which are daily, the highest in any province. Ontario is home to the largest newspaper (Note: in weekly circulation) in Canada, the Toronto Star, and Canada's newspaper of record, The Globe and Mail. There are also numerous weekly newspapers for individual communities, though print publications for these papers have been on a downwards trend due to local news being shared on sites like Facebook.

=== Songs and slogans ===
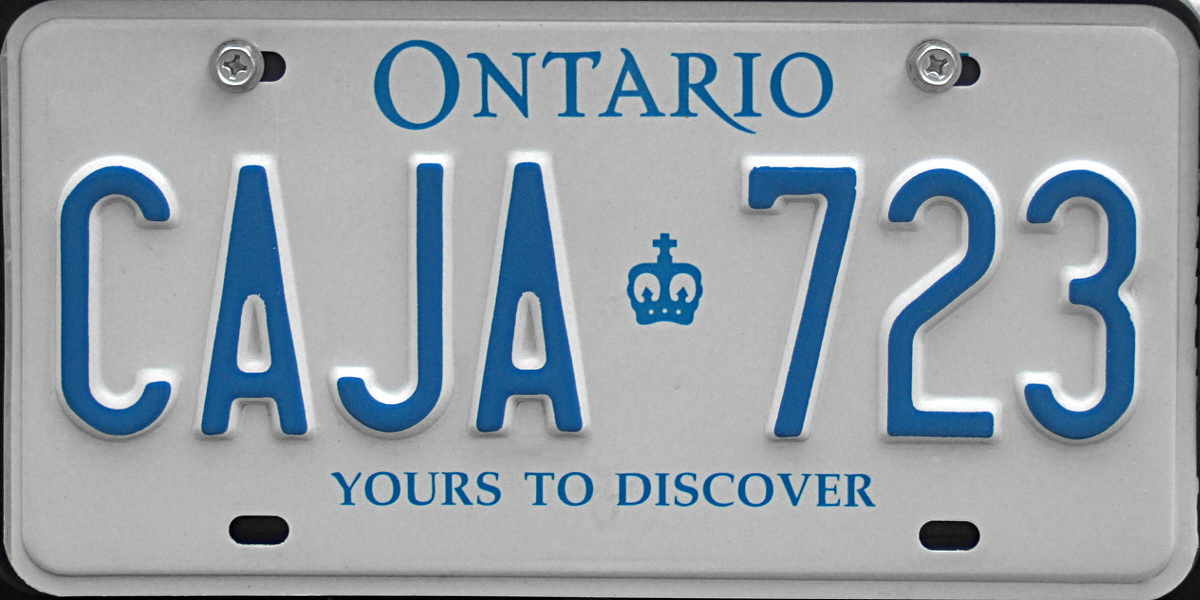
An Ontario licence plate with the slogan Yours to Discover at the bottom of the plate

In 1973, the first slogan to appear on licence plates in Ontario was "Keep It Beautiful". This was replaced by "Yours to Discover" in 1982, which was originally used as a tourism slogan beginning in 1980. Plates with the French equivalent, Tant à découvrir, were made available to the public beginning in May 2008. From 1988 to 1990, "Ontario Incredible" gave "Yours to Discover" a brief respite. In 2020, as part of a licence plate redesign, the slogan was changed to "A Place to Grow," inspired by the song A Place to Stand, a Place to Grow. This decision was reversed in the same year, due to visibility concerns. The slogan on licence plates remains "Yours to Discover".

A Place to Stand, a Place to Grow was originally commissioned by the government of Ontario for its pavilion in Expo 67, and it became an unofficial anthem of the province. As a part of the Canada 150 celebrations in 2017, the provincial government released an updated rendition. In 2007, the provincial tourism agency commissioned a new song, "There's No Place Like This" is featured in television advertising, performed by Ontario artists including Molly Johnson, Brian Byrne, Keshia Chanté, as well as Tomi Swick and Arkells.

=== Professional sports ===
Ontario has professional sports teams in baseball, basketball, Canadian football, ice hockey, lacrosse, and soccer. Major professional sports teams include the Toronto Maple Leafs, Ottawa Senators, Toronto Blue Jays, and the Toronto Raptors.

Additionally, there are Canadian Football League (CFL) teams such as the Toronto Argonauts, Ottawa Redblacks, and Hamilton Tiger-Cats.

Canadian Elite Basketball League (CEBL) teams are Scarborough Shooting Stars, Brampton Honey Badgers, Ottawa BlackJacks, and Niagara River Lions.

Canadian Premier League (CPL) teams include Atlético Ottawa, Forge FC, and Inter Toronto FC.

Canadian Baseball League (CBL) teams are Barrie Baycats, Brantford Red Sox, Chatham-Kent Barnstormers, Guelph Royals, Hamilton Cardinals, Kitchener Panthers, London Majors, Toronto Maple Leafs, and Welland Jackfish.

== Transportation ==
Transportation in Ontario is under the purview of the Ministry of Transportation of Ontario and Transport Canada. Infrastructure and laws relating to road transport is the responsibility of the Ministry of Transportation, while infrastructure and laws relating to air, rail and marine transport is the responsibility of Transport Canada.

=== Air travel ===
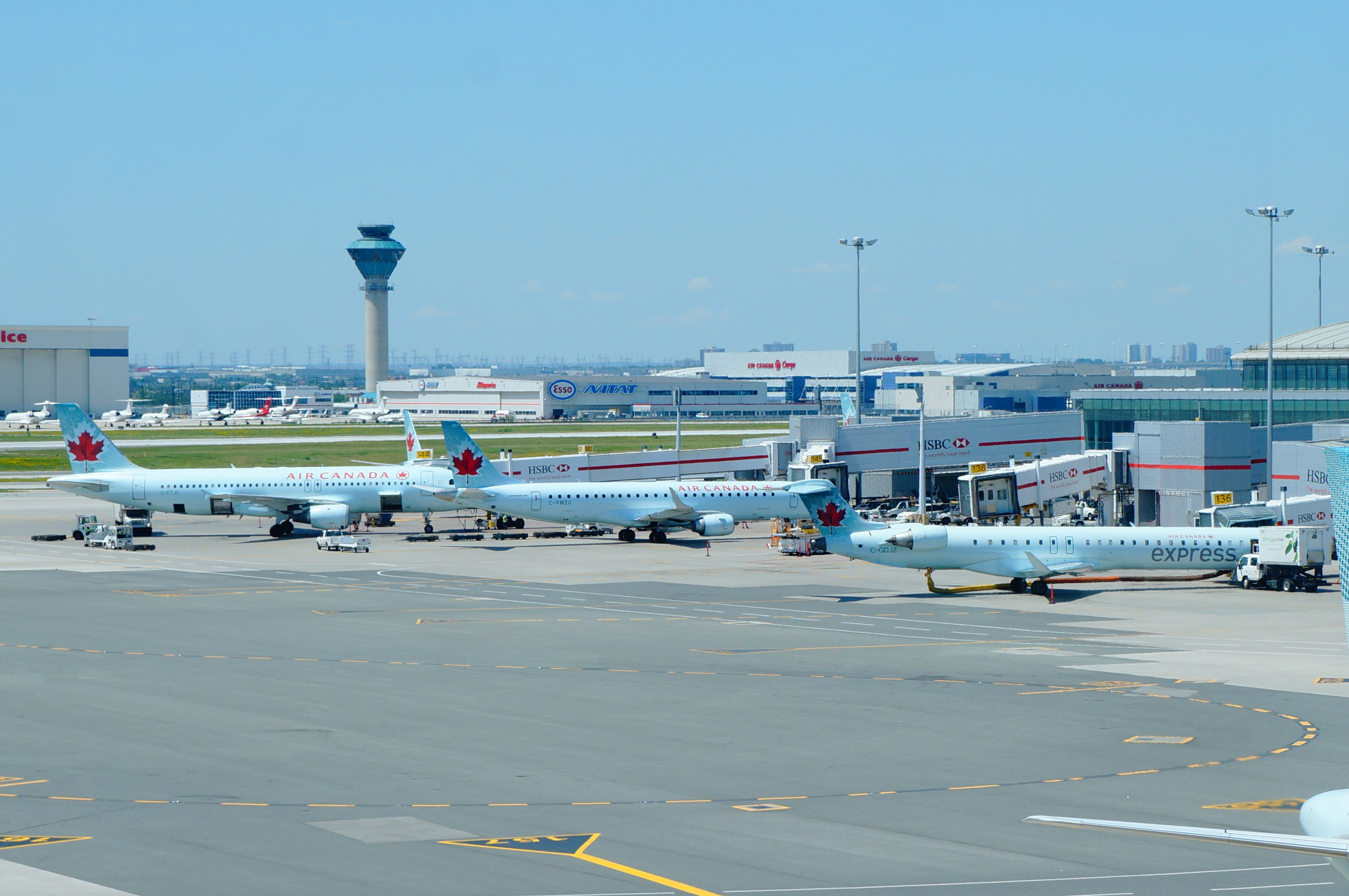
The airport apron of Pearson Airport, Canada's busiest airport. The control tower is visible in the background.

There are two Transport Canada designated international airports in Ontario They are Toronto Pearson International Airport, the busiest airport in Canada, handling 44 million passengers in 2023 and Ottawa Macdonald–Cartier International Airport, Ontario's second largest airport, handling over 4 million passengers in 2023. In addition to airports in Ottawa, and Toronto, the province also operates 11 other airports of entry.

A number of Ontario cities also have regional airports, many of which have scheduled commuter flights from Jazz Aviation or smaller airlines and charter companies – flights from mid-size cities such as Sudbury and Sault Ste. Marie, to larger airports in Toronto and Ottawa. Bearskin Airlines also runs flights along the northerly east–west route, connecting North Bay, Sudbury, Sault Ste. Marie, and Thunder Bay directly.

Remote and isolated communities in the northern areas of the province rely partly or entirely on air service for travel, goods, and even ambulance services (MEDIVAC), since much of the far northern area of the province cannot be reached by road (or by year-round road) or rail.

=== Railways ===
A Via Rail train approaching Brampton station

Via Rail operates the inter-regional passenger train service on the Quebec City–Windsor Corridor, along with The Canadian, a transcontinental rail service from Southern Ontario to Vancouver, and the Sudbury–White River train. Additionally, Amtrak rail connects Ontario with key New York cities including Buffalo, Albany, and New York City.

Ontario Northland provides rail service to destinations as far north as Moosonee near James Bay, connecting them with the south.

GO train

Regional commuter rail is limited to the provincially owned GO Transit, and serves a train-bus network spanning the Golden Horseshoe region, with Union Station in Toronto serving as the transport hub.

Freight rail is dominated by the founding cross-country Canadian National Railway and Canadian Pacific Kansas City (formerly CP Rail) companies. As of 2021, there are 19,979 km of railways in operation.

There are several city rail-transit systems in the Province. The Toronto Transit Commission operates subways, as well as streetcars (being one of the busiest streetcar systems in North America). OC Transpo operates a light rail metro system in Ottawa. In addition, Waterloo region operates a surface light rail system called Ion. Construction on light rail lines, such as the Hurontario LRT, are also underway in the Regional Municipality of Peel, and are expected to be completed by late 2024.

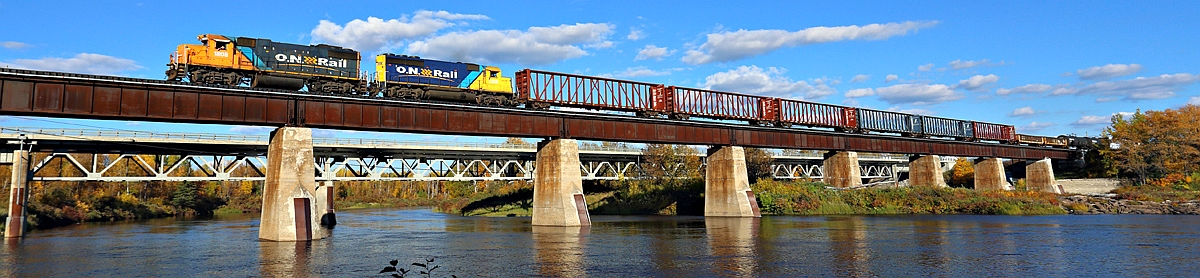
An Ontario Northland freight train crossing the Missinaibi River at Mattice-Val Côté in Northern Ontario

=== Roads ===
Highway 407 in Southern Ontario. The roadway forms a part of the province's 400-series highways.

400-series highways make up the primary vehicular network in the south of province, and they connect at a number of points to border crossings to the United States, and Quebec, the busiest being the Detroit–Windsor Tunnel and Ambassador Bridge and the Blue Water Bridge (via Highway 402). Some of the primary highways along the southern route are Highway 401, Highway 417, and Highway 400, Highway 401 being the busiest highway in North America. Other provincial highways and regional roads inter-connect the remainder of the province, and the Trans-Canada Highway connects the province to the rest of the country.

=== Waterways ===
The St. Lawrence Seaway, which extends across most of the southern portion of the province and connects to the Atlantic Ocean, is the primary water transportation route for cargo, particularly iron ore and grain. In the past, the Great Lakes and St. Lawrence River were also a major passenger transportation route, including with the early 20th century growth of Canada Steamship Lines. In the 1930s, passenger traffic greatly declined.

Though some cruise lines still exist, as of 2022 less than 20% of traffic were non-cargo or passenger ships. Ontario's three largest ports (Note: As of 2011, domestic and international tonnage) are the Port of Hamilton, Port of Thunder Bay and the Port of Nanticoke. Ontario's only saltwater port is located in the town of Moosonee on James Bay.

== See also ==
- Outline of Ontario
- Index of Ontario-related articles

== Sources ==
- Michael Sletcher, "Ottawa", in James Ciment, ed., Colonial America: An Encyclopedia of Social, Political, Cultural, and Economic History, (5 vols., M. E. Sharpe, New York, 2006).
- Virtual Vault, an online exhibition of Canadian historical art at Library and Archives Canada.
- Baskerville, Peter A. (2005). Sites of power: a concise history of Ontario. Oxford University Press. ISBN 978-0-1954-1892-7.
