= Kenilworth Park =

Kenilworth Park can refer to:

- Kenilworth Park (Portland, Oregon), United States
- Kenilworth Park and Aquatic Gardens, a national park in Washington, D.C., United States
- Kenilworth Park Racetrack, former racetrack near Windsor, Ontario, Canada
