= Dufferin Park Racetrack =

Canadian horse racing track

Coordinates: 43.655965°N 79.435658°W

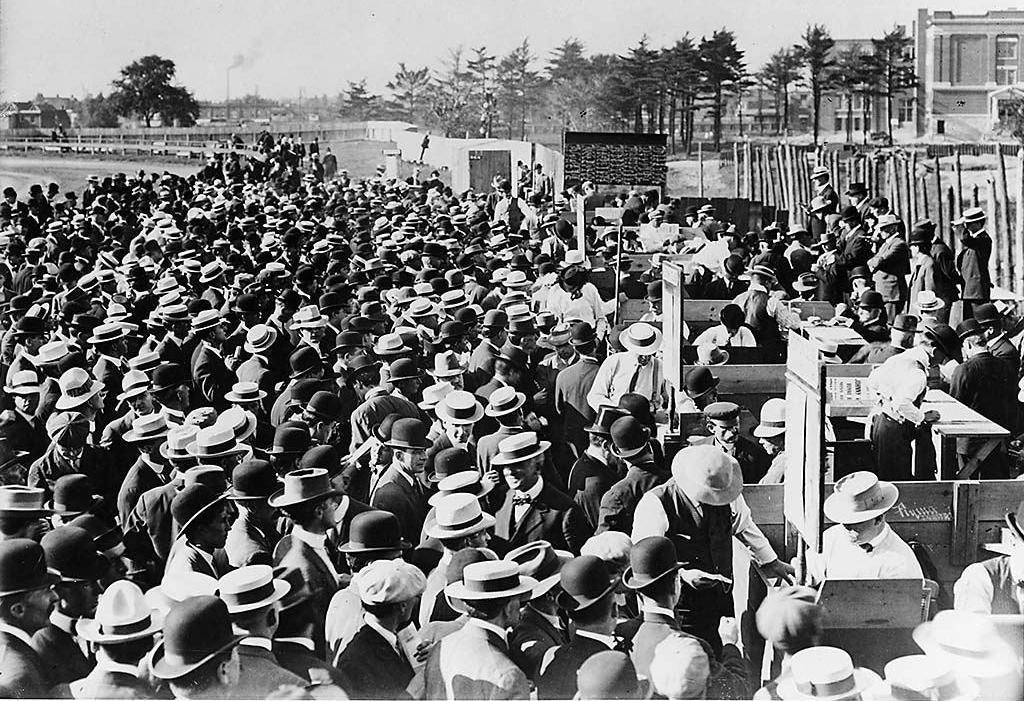
- Betting at Old Dufferin Racetrack, 1908. Photo by William James
- Interactive map of Dufferin Park Racetrack
- Location: Toronto, Ontario; Canada
- Owned by: Abe Orpen, Fred Orpen
- Date opened: Harness: August 15, 1907, Thoroughbreds: Sept. 11–12, 1907
- Date closed: November 8, 1955
- Course type: Flat Thoroughbred/Harness
- Notable races: Canadian International Stakes (1942–1945), Cup and Saucer Stakes (1942–1945), Valedictory Stakes (1952–1955)

Dufferin Park Racetrack was a racetrack for thoroughbred horse races located on Dufferin Street in the city of Toronto, Ontario, Canada. It was demolished in 1955 and its stakes races moved to Woodbine Racetrack as part of a consolidation of racetracks in the Toronto area. The track was owned by Abe Orpen and his family after his death. Only 0.5 miles (0.80 km) in length, it was also called Little Saratoga. The site is now the Dufferin Mall shopping centre.

== History ==
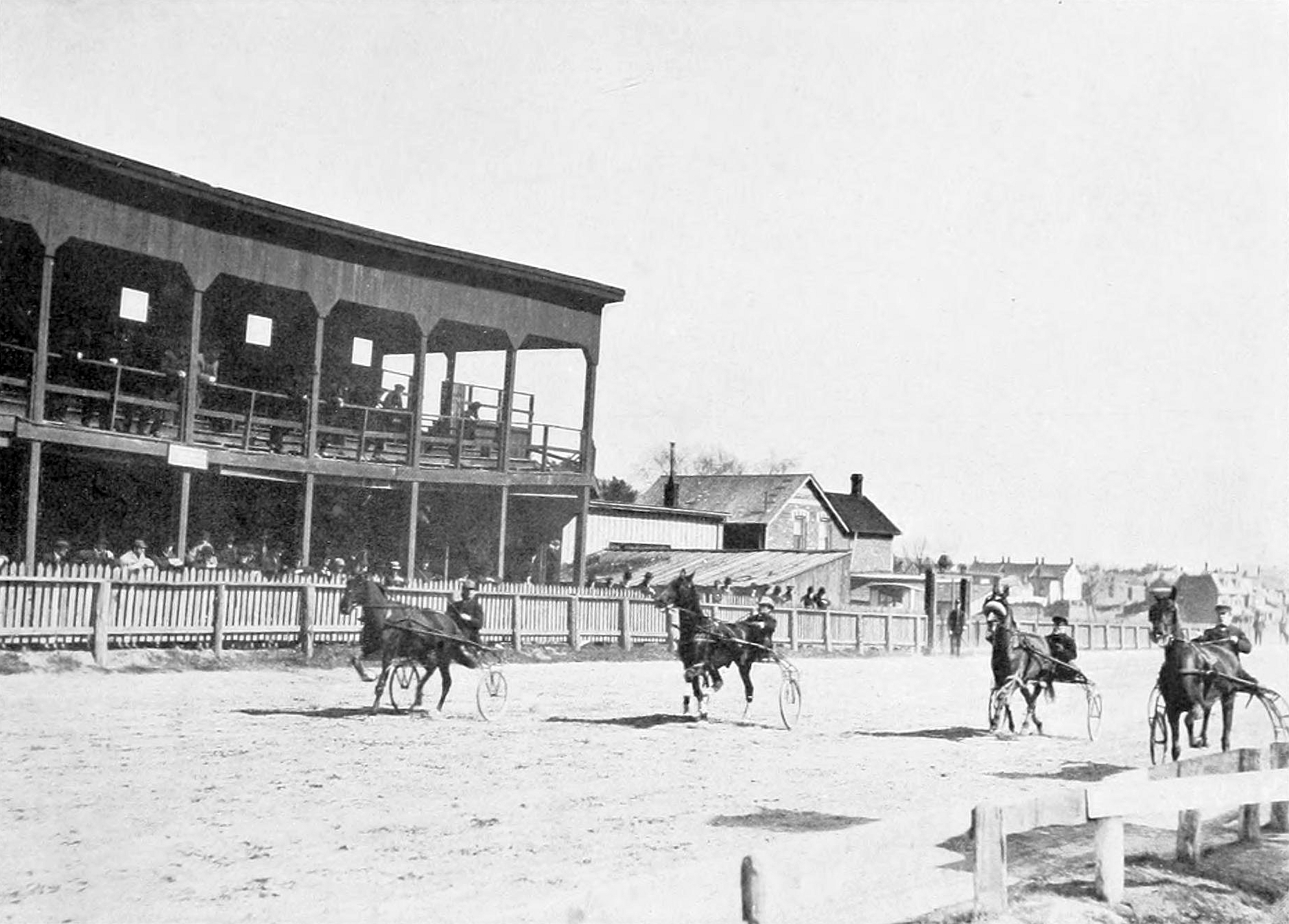
Dufferin Park Racetrack, 1909

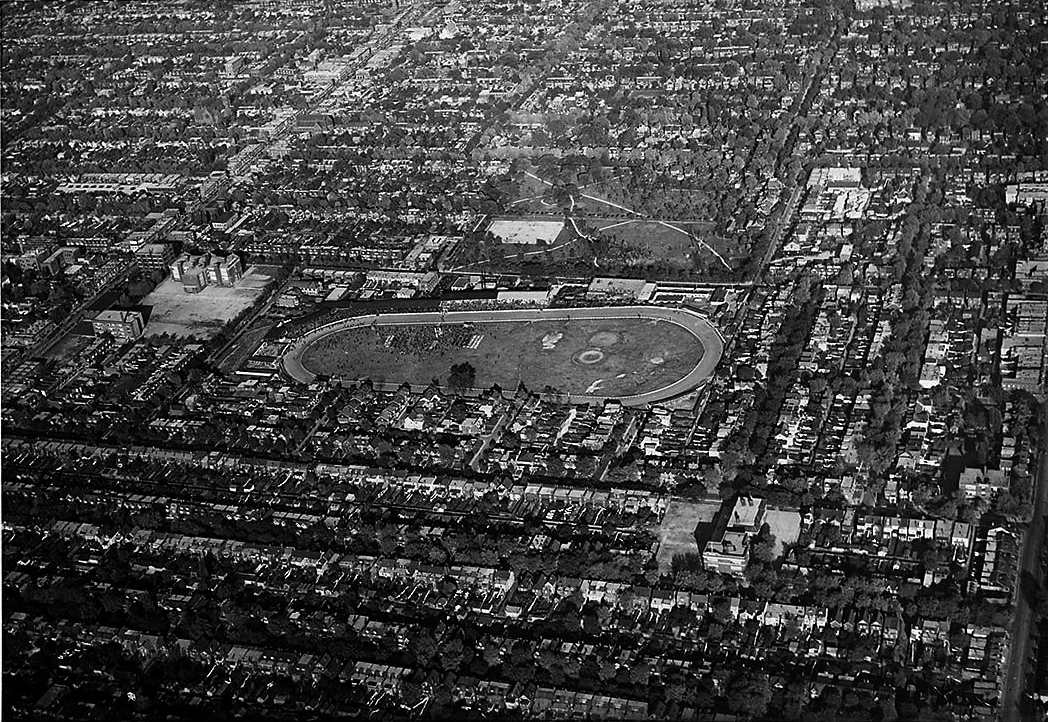
Aerial view, 1930. Photo by William James.

After a provincial racing charter was granted in 1894 to the York Riding and Driving Association to operate horse racing and sell liquor, a half-mile track was laid out on 25 acres (10 ha) of land on the west side of Dufferin Street owned by Charles Leslie Denison. After Denison died, Abraham "Abe" Orpen leased the land from Denison for CA$400 per year and opened Dufferin Racetrack in 1907. Horse race gambling was controversial at the time and the charter was revoked in 1909, although this was due to a legal technicality as the charter had not been used for several years prior to 1907.

Orpen appealed to Canadian Prime Minister Wilfrid Laurier directly and was granted a federal charter. Orpen, along with other businessmen incorporated the Metropolitan Racing Association of Canada, under a federal racing charter, which allowed betting on the site beyond provincial controls. The Association was originally capitalized for CA$4,060, divided into 40 shares of $100 and six of $10.

The track had its stables to the south of the track, along with a winter barn which was also used for offices. The public entrance was at the south-east corner of the property, through the stable yard. Betting was handled by bookmakers who operated in front of the grandstand and in the infield, and bets were also made on races at other tracks. Admission was charged to the patrons, although free admission was granted after the first few races. Racing was held into November, and often races were held in the dim light of the evening. Judges would hold lanterns to judge the finishing order. In one infamous incident during these "midnight races" a long-shot horse named Mulock held up at the turn and waited until the horses made a lap of the track and then raced to the finish ahead of the others. Despite the controversy, the bets on Mulock were paid.

The track was a financial success, one of several successful tracks in the Toronto area. In 1916, Orpen opened the Kenilworth Park Racetrack in Windsor, Ontario. In 1917, Orpen was an investor in the Thorncliffe Park Raceway. In 1924, Orpen opened the Long Branch Racetrack in Etobicoke Township, just north of the village of Long Branch.

Orpen renewed the lease in 1925 and purchased the track a few years later. After Orpen died in 1937, his son Fred Orpen took over and operated the racing syndicate. Fred would play the national anthem on a piano on the public address system every meet day at Dufferin to start the day.

During World War II, Long Branch was closed and some of its stakes races were held at Dufferin Park. From 1942–45, the Canadian International Stakes and the Cup and Saucer Stakes were run at Dufferin Park.

Thorncliffe closed in 1952 and the Orpen tracks were sold to E. P. Taylor and closed down in 1955, with racing consolidated at the new Woodbine Racetrack. Taylor paid a reported CA$4 million for Orpen's tracks and racing charters and transferred them to the Ontario Jockey Club on December 1, 1955. The final race was on November 8, 1955, won by Honeybellee. The Dufferin Mall is located on the site today.

After the sale, Fred Orpen got out of the horse-racing business completely. He built an estate on 400 acres (160 ha) of land near Alton, which he sold in 1972 to develop a housing sub-division. He died on October 28, 1978, at the age of 82.

== Other uses ==
The site was also used as the location for an annual travelling circus. It was used by local high school Central Commerce Collegiate for athletics meets. From 1951, the site was also used for a musical theatre production in a tent, called Melody Fair.

== See also ==
- Dufferin Mall
