= Dufferin Mall =

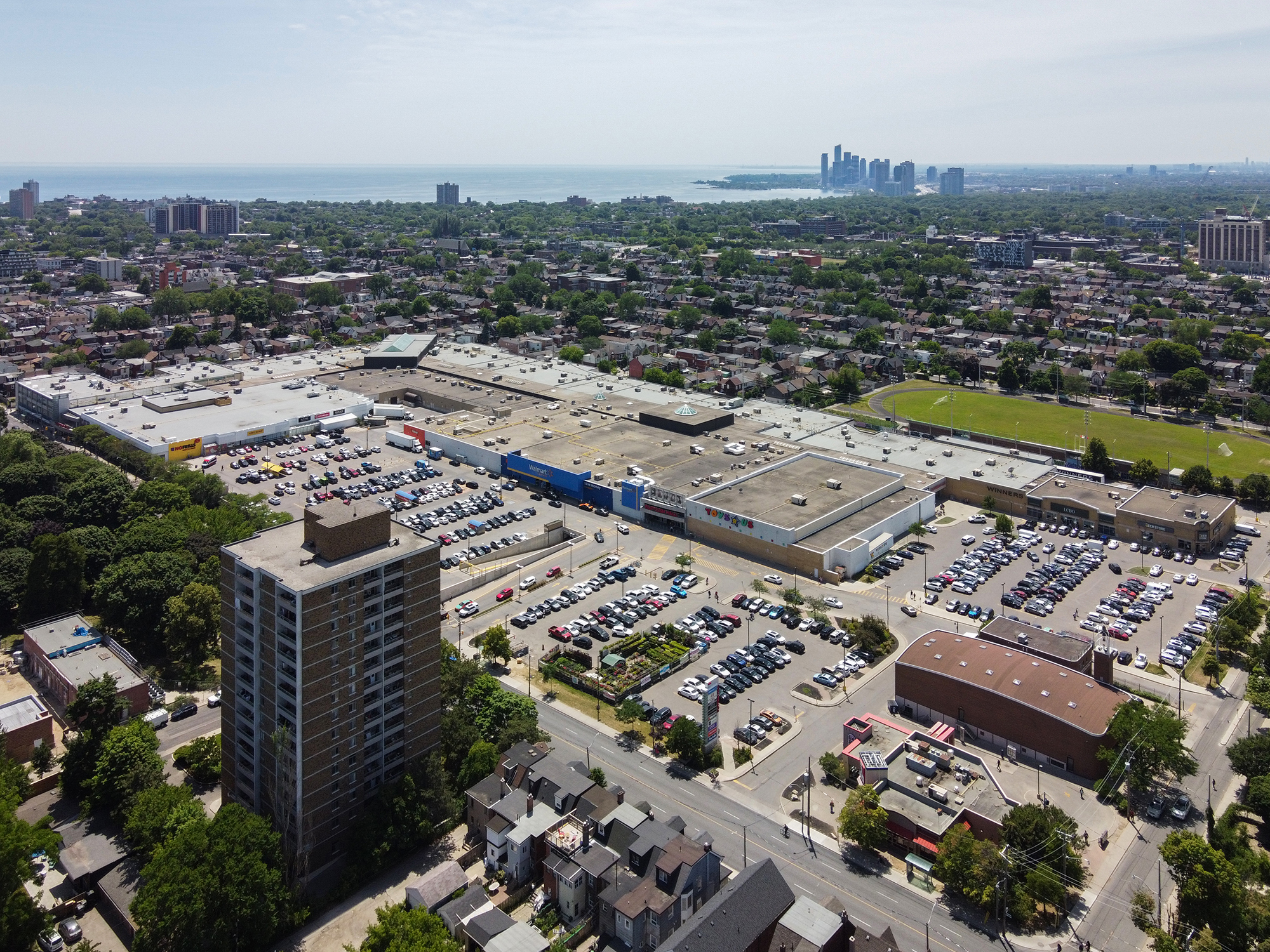
- Coordinates: 43.655965°N 79.435658°W
- Address: 900 Dufferin Street; Toronto, Ontario; M6H 4A9
- Opened: 1973
- Manager: Primaris REIT
- Owner: Primaris REIT
- Num. of stores: 130
- Num. of anchor tenants: 4
- Floor area: 567,000 sq ft (52,700 m^{2})
- Floors: 3
- Website: dufferinmall.ca

Dufferin Mall is a shopping mall in Toronto, Ontario, Canada. It is located on the west side of Dufferin Street, south of the intersection of Bloor Street West, in the Brockton Village neighbourhood. It was first built as a shopping plaza in the 1950s on the site of the Dufferin Park Racetrack. It was later enclosed and made into a mall, in the 1970s.

== Description ==
Dufferin Mall is a 567,000-square-foot (52,700 m^{2}) district shopping centre. It has over 120 shops and services including big box stores and numerous clothing chains. The mall has a food court at the mall's southwest corner. The centre has a three-level parking lot.

Dufferin Mall attracts over 12 million visitors per year, making it one of the busiest malls per square foot in North America.

== History ==
The location was a part of the Denison estate. In 1907, the site was leased to Abe Orpen who established the Dufferin Park Racetrack. The track operated from 1907 until 1955 when the track was sold to the Ontario Jockey Club and closed. The Ontario Jockey Club consolidated its locations and sold the site for development. The Dufferin Plaza Shopping Centre was a shopping plaza established in 1956. The shopping plaza opened in 1957 but was converted to an enclosed mall, opening as Dufferin Mall in 1973.

A past anchor includes Horizon, a discount department store owned by T. Eaton Company. The space was converted to a regular Eaton's store upon the closure of the Horizon chain with the space being converted to a No Frills grocery store in the 1990s with Toys "R" Us occupying the former No Frills space. Another past anchor was Woolco, which later became Wal-Mart in 1994, then upgraded to Wal-Mart Supercentre. Zellers formerly operated in Dufferin Mall and has been replaced with smaller stores. Consumers Distributing formerly operated in Dufferin Mall until it became defunct in 1996.

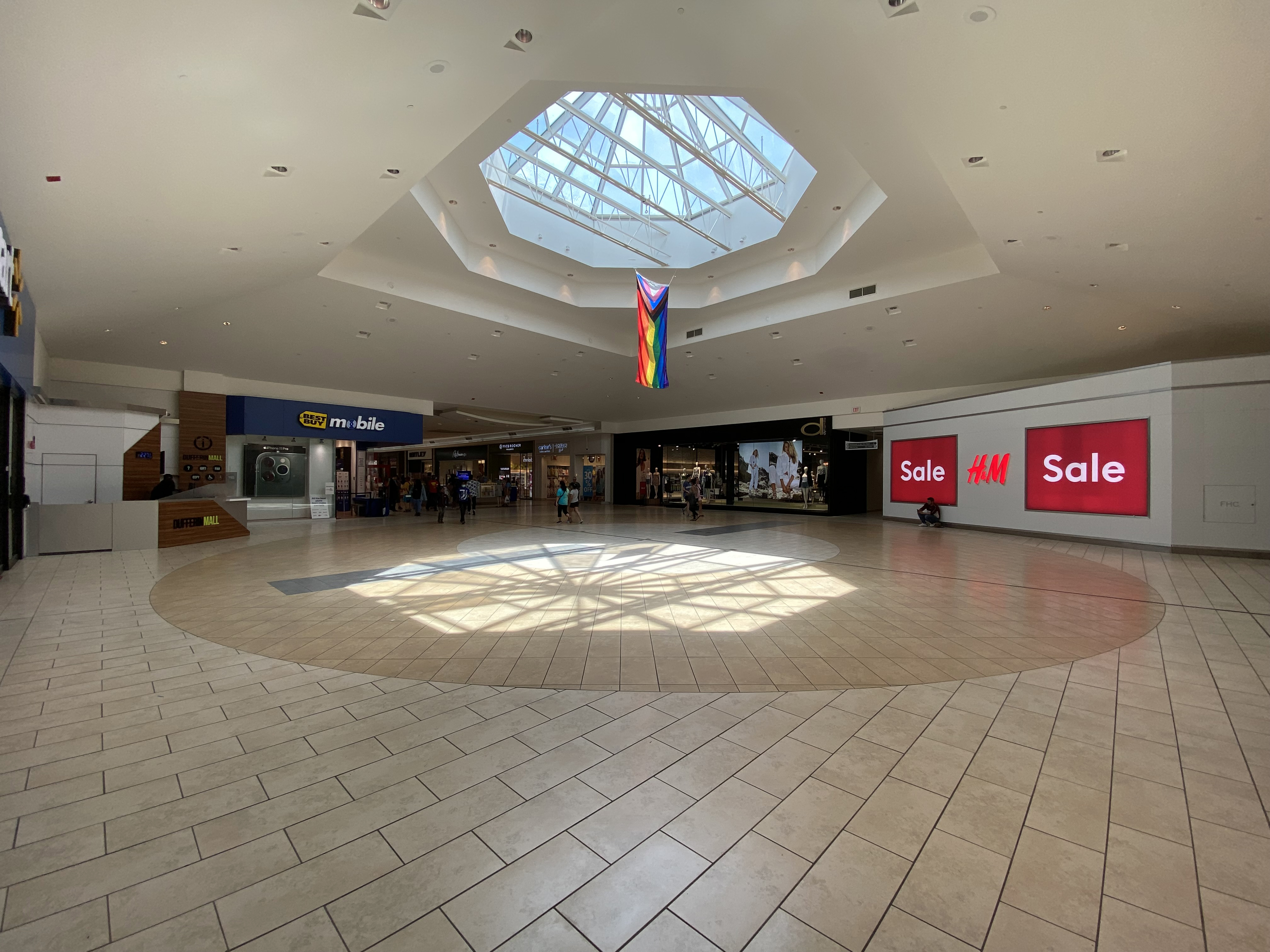
Atrium of the Mall

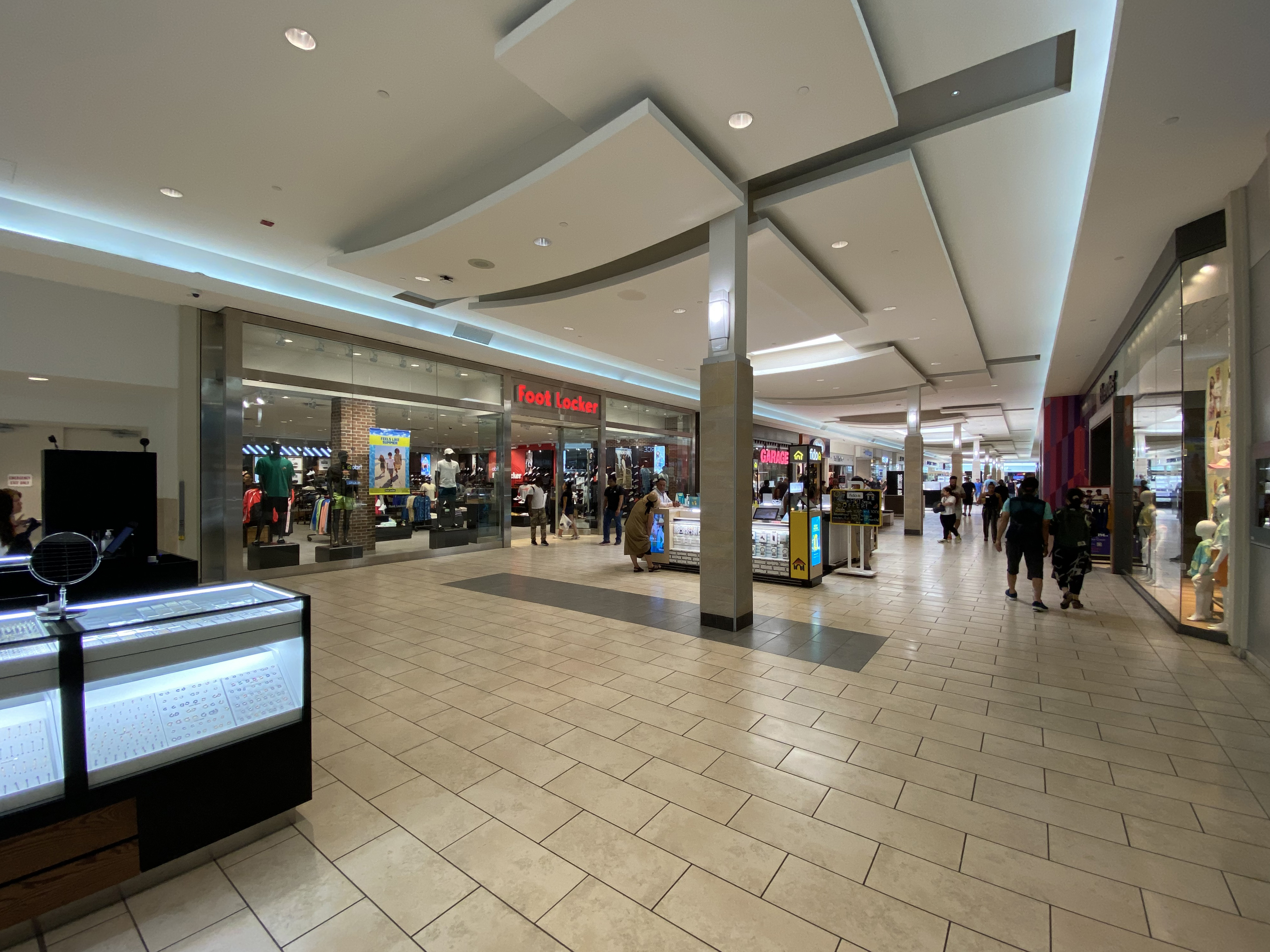
Interior of the Mall

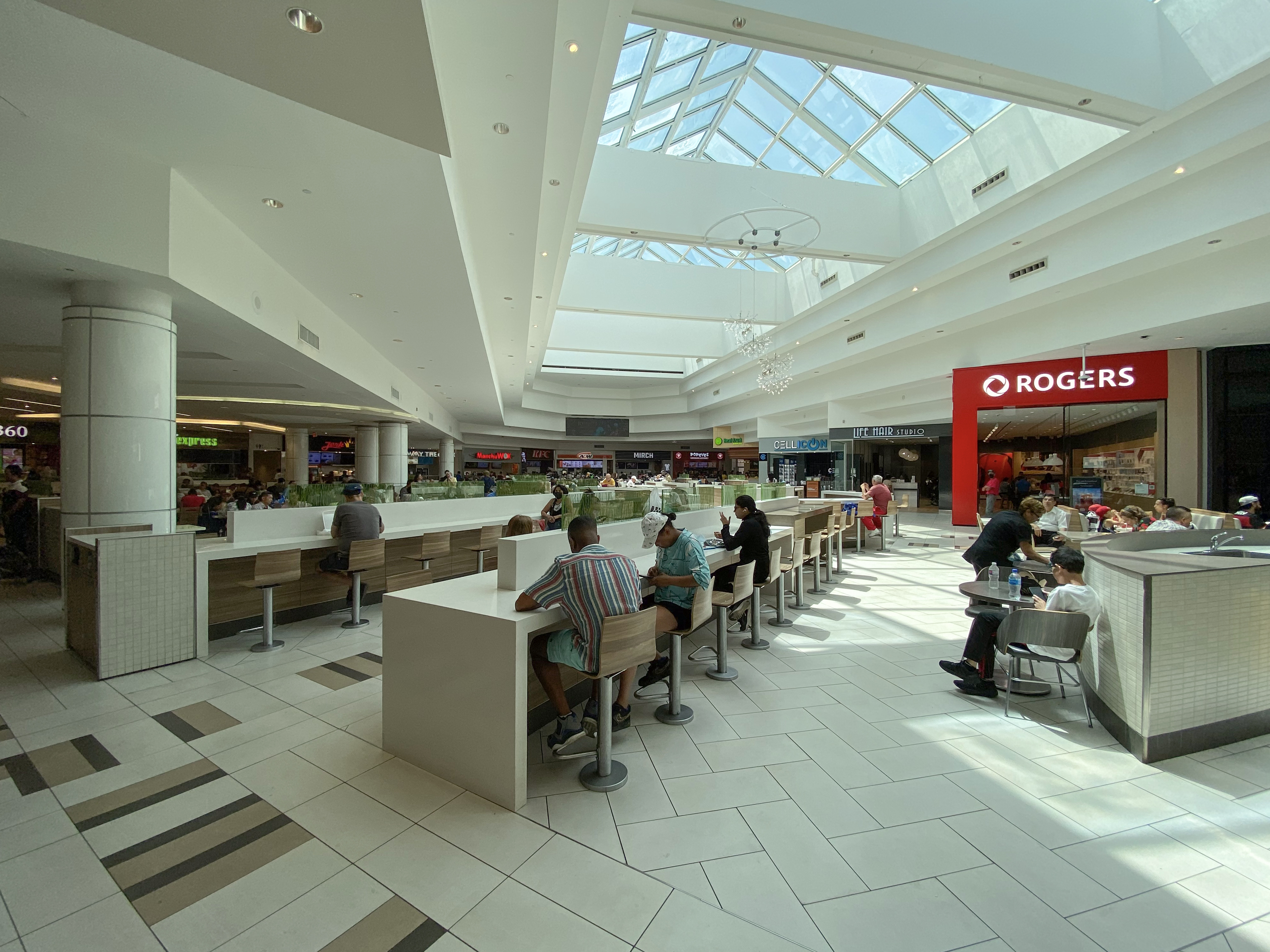
Food Court

== See also ==
- Dufferin Park Racetrack
