= Millar Addition =

The Millar Addition is a suburb of Prince George, British Columbia, Canada. It is named in honor of its developer, Charles Vance Millar, who later became famous for leaving behind the most notorious will in Canadian history, which was the catalyst for the Stork Derby.

== History ==
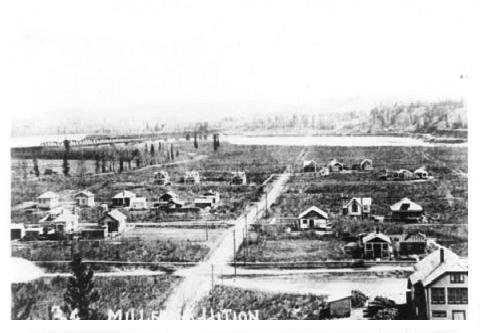
Millar Addition (1921)

When the construction of the Grand Trunk Pacific Railway was announced in the early 1900s, many new towns were built and promoted along the proposed route. Some were built by the railway themselves, while others were built by land speculators, who were hoping to get in on the ground floor before the railway was completed. Sometimes this created a great deal of rivalry. In Prince George, then known as Fort George, there was more rivalry than usual. By the time the railway was ready to purchase land for a townsite there in 1910, two rival ones had already been built, South Fort George and Central Fort George, each of them bordering a 1,366-acre (5.53 km^{2}) Lheidli T'enneh village and reserve.

Not wanting to buy into either of these rival townsites, the Grand Trunk Pacific began negotiating to purchase the First Nations property, but were continually foiled by Central Fort George's promoter, George Hammond, who invited the Chief of Fort George "to tea" on two separate occasions to make sure the Chief knew just what the land was worth to the railway and advised him not to sell. As the negotiations dragged on, an agent for Charles Millar, then the owner of the BC Express Company, successfully made a deal with the Chief and their spokesman, Father Nicolas Coccola. When the railway learned that yet another townsite was going to be built on the very land they wanted the most they appealed to Ottawa and Millar's deal was negated. In the end the GTP settled out of court and sold Millar 200 acres (0.81 km^{2}) of the property for $59,296, which Millar subdivided and promoted in 1914. It has been theorized that the railway resented having to sell the land to Millar and struck back by building low-level bridges on the upper Fraser River, effectively blocking one of Millar's sternwheelers, the BC Express, from working on her profitable route from Fort George to Tête Jaune Cache.

== Modern day ==
Today, Millar Addition is primarily a residential area and is home to some of the city's oldest heritage homes, some dating back to the early 1920s.
