= Woodbine Entertainment Group =

Canadian horse racing operator

- Company type: Not-for-profit corporation without shareholders
- Industry: Horse racing and gambling
- Founded: 1881 (as the Ontario Jockey Club)
- Headquarters: Toronto, Ontario, Canada
- Key people: Michael Copeland (CEO)
- Website: woodbine.com/corporate

Woodbine Entertainment Group (WEG), known as the Ontario Jockey Club from 1881 to 2001, is the operator of two horse racing tracks, a casino and off-track betting stations in the Greater Toronto Area of Ontario, Canada. It also owns and operates the Canadian digital television service HPItv and operates Canada's only online wagering platform for horse racing, HorsePlayer Interactive. WEG is responsible for operating Woodbine Racetrack in Toronto, and it also runs Woodbine Mohawk Park in Campbellville, Ontario. It employs over 2,300 people in its operations. WEG also ran the Turf Lounge on Bay Street in Toronto from 2003 to 2015.

== History ==
The Ontario Jockey Club (OJC) was founded in 1881 to improve the quality of horse racing in the city of Toronto. William Hendrie, president of the Ontario Jockey Club and of the Hendrie Co., Limited, was a railway promoter and capitalist who was the founder of one of the most prominent families in the history of Thoroughbred racing in Canada. With the creation of the Canadian Horse Racing Hall of Fame in 1976, Hendrie was elected to the Builders category.

During the 19th century, the city of Toronto had several racetracks. The OJC operated from the original Woodbine track on Queen Street East, which later became known as Greenwood.

In 1953, E. P. Taylor became president of the Ontario Jockey Club. During his term, Taylor bought out competing tracks, making the OJC the largest operation in the province, starting with the Thorncliffe Park Raceway. In 1955, the OJC bought out the Dufferin Park Racetrack and the Long Branch Racetrack from the Orpen family. These tracks were closed and their important stakes races were moved to the new Woodbine track, which opened in 1956. Hamilton and Stamford tracks were also bought and closed.

In 1962, the club bought out the Fort Erie Racetrack, and OJC tracks thus held all three races of the Canadian Triple Crown. In 1963, the OJC opened the Mohawk harness racing track in Campbellville, Ontario.

As other gambling was gradually legalized in Ontario, horse racing declined. In 1996, the Greenwood facility was closed and developed as a housing subdivision. The Government of Ontario, introducing more sport lotteries, starting installing gambling machines in race tracks and installed a gaming room at Woodbine, known as Casino Woodbine.

In 2001, the Ontario Jockey Club changed its name to Woodbine Entertainment Group to reflect its expanded focus. In 2007, Woodbine's harness racing operations were moved to Mohawk. In 2012, the Fort Erie Racetrack was threatened with closure when it was unable to add slot machines. WEG operated the track for one more season, then sold the track in 2014. The casino at Woodbine, operated by Ontario Lotteries, was transferred to Great Canadian Gaming Corporation in 2018.

== C spring barouche landau ==
Woodbine Entertainment Group possesses a C spring barouche landau, which was originally imported from the United Kingdom in the 1960s by E.P. Taylor, who was then President of the Ontario Jockey Club. Made by Barker and Company of the United Kingdom, it has been used to transport members of the Canadian royal family and viceroys during the Queen's Plate in Toronto.The carriage is stored and maintained by the keeper of the landau, who also delivers it to Woodbine Race Track and the Royal Canadian Mounted Police provides the postilion turnout.

== Notable people ==
- Jim Coleman, Canadian sports journalist and press secretary of the Ontario Jockey Club from 1952 to 1962
