= Kenilworth Park Racetrack =

Horse racing track

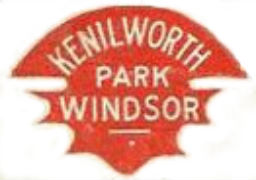

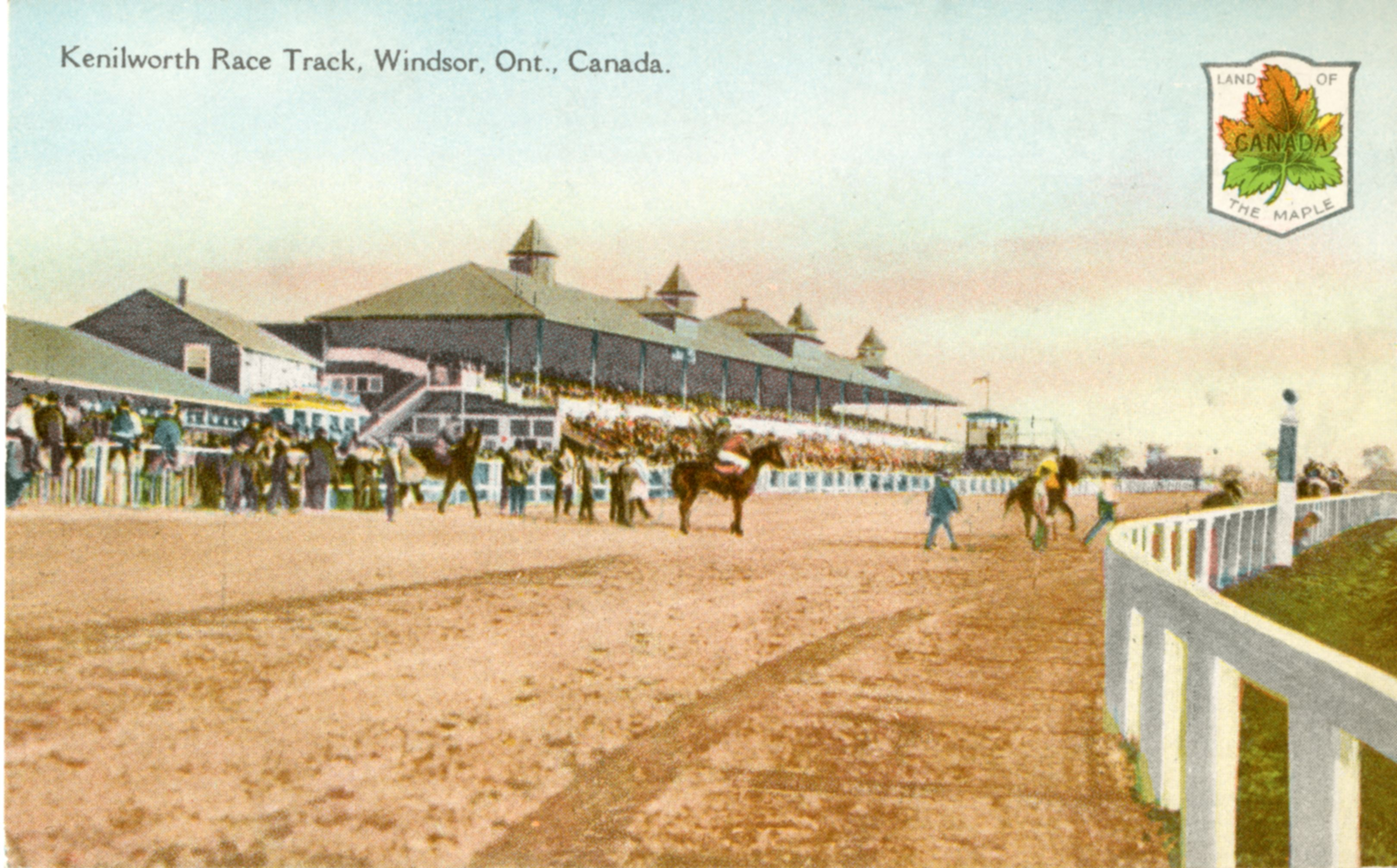
- Postcard of Kenilworth Park in 1930
- Location: Windsor, Ontario, Canada
- Coordinates: 42.268356°N 83.002829°W
- Owned by: Abe Orpen, Fred Orpen, H. D. Brown, Charles Vance Millar, Thomas Hare
- Date opened: 1926
- Date closed: 1935
- Course type: Flat Thoroughbred

Kenilworth Park Racetrack was a horse racing racetrack just outside Windsor, Ontario, Canada. It was owned by Toronto businessmen Abe Orpen, Charles Vance Millar, H. D. Brown and Thomas Hare. Orpen also owned Dufferin Park Racetrack and Long Branch Racetrack. It was notable for a match race between horses Man o' War and Triple Crown winner Sir Barton in 1920. The track operated from September 1916 to 1935. It was one of three racetracks that operated in the Windsor area while horse racing in Michigan, specifically Detroit, was banned. The track operated for only two years after horse race betting in Michigan was legalized in 1933.

== History ==
In 1916, partners Charles Millar, H. D. "Curly" Brown, Abe Orpen and Thomas Hare built the Kenilworth Park Racetrack on 85 acres (34 ha) just outside Windsor, Ontario. They bought the grandstand from the defunct Kenilworth Racetrack in Buffalo, New York, dismantled it and reconstructed it at the new track. To make the racing legal, the partners bought an old racing charter that permitted 14 days of racing. It opened as an independent track on September 2, 1916, staffed by the Dufferin Park staff. In 1917, the track joined the Canadian Racing Association (CRA) and held two CRA meets, a seven-day meet in August and a seven-day meet in October, as well as its own season in July.

When Kenilworth opened in 1916, there already was an existing track in Windsor: Hendrie, which was controlled by the owners of the Connaught Park Racetrack. Later in 1916, a third track was built at Windsor: Devonshire, which was built nearby. Orpen attempted to stop the new track by challenging its license and then threatening that anyone who raced at Devonshire would be banned from Kenilworth. However, when the Devonshire half-mile track opened with horses considered second-rate, Orpen withdrew his opposition to the track.

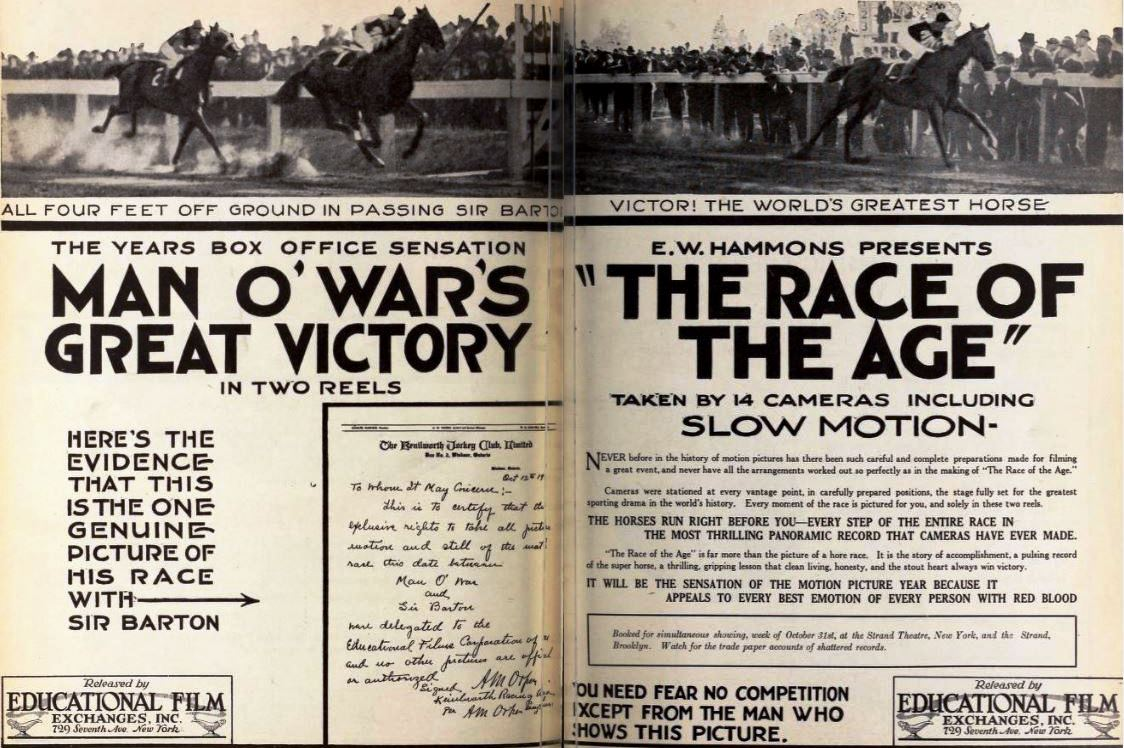
"The Race of the Age"

In 1920, Orpen out-bid several racetracks to land a match race between Man o' War and Triple Crown winner Sir Barton at the track. The Kenilworth Park Gold Cup was so highly anticipated that it became the first horserace to be filmed in its entirety, with the resulting footage later shown in movie theatres across the country. The October 12, 1920, race was originally intended to be a face-off between the three great horses of the time: Man o' War, Sir Barton and Exterminator. However, the owners of Sir Barton and Man o' War agreed to a distance of 1 1/4 miles, which was too short for Exterminator to run his best, and agreed to a weight-for-age format, under which the older Exterminator would concede weight to Man o' War. Therefore, Exterminator was not entered, and in fact, raced that same day on a different track. Orpen put up a $75,000 purse and a $5,000 gold cup, now known as the Man o' War Cup, designed by Tiffany & Co. of New York. The crowd at the track for the race was estimated at more than 30,000 and it bet CA$220,000 on the race.

Millar died in 1926. In his will, every duly ordained Christian minister in Walkerville, Sandwich and Windsor, "except Spracklin, who shot a hotelkeeper" was to receive a share of Kenilworth Park. In October 1928, five pastors in Windsor claimed the bequest of the Kenilworth shares. The value of the shares was hard to judge, as the stock did not trade publicly. One estimation was that they were worth less than one cent each.

In 1933, Michigan legalized horse racing with betting. Michigan officials allowed horse racing on the State Fair Grounds in Detroit – across the Canada–U.S. border from Windsor – at the same time as a planned Kenilworth meet. Orpen applied for relief of racing taxes from the Government of Ontario, but was turned down. Expecting a loss, Kenilworth postponed its meet.

The track held its last meet in 1935. According to Orpen, competition from the Detroit race track left no room for a meet. The track had lost CA$43,000 on an early spring meet run in May 1934, the dates selected to avoid competing with the Detroit races. Devonshire held its last meet in 1936, ending the run of the Windsor race tracks.

Kenilworth's grandstand was demolished in 1939 and the site was developed as a housing subdivision. Fred Orpen had the steel from the grandstand delivered to the Long Branch Racetrack, intending to re-use the steel for a new grandstand at Dufferin Park, but the idea was abandoned. The racing charter was transferred to Long Branch to give it an extra seven days of racing per year.

== Legacy ==
The racetrack site is marked by a small park known as Kenilworth Park on Howard Avenue. Several of the streets are named after the park: Kenilworth Drive and Kenilworth Place. The match race is available to view on the internet.
