= Charles Vance Millar =

Canadian lawyer and financier (1854–1926)

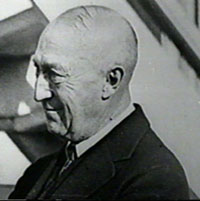
- Born: June 28, 1854; Aylmer, Canada West
- Died: October 31, 1926 (aged 72); Toronto, Ontario, Canada
- Occupations: Lawyer, financier
- Known for: Being a notorious practical joker, most notably in his unusual will, which began the Stork Derby.

Charles Vance Millar (June 28, 1854 – October 31, 1926) was a Canadian lawyer and financier. He was the president and part-owner of the Toronto brewery of O'Keefe Brewery. He also owned racehorses, including the 1915 King's Plate–winning horse Tartarean. However, he is now best known for his unusual will which touched off the Great Stork Derby.

== Early years ==
Millar was born in Aylmer, Canada West, the only child of farmers Simon and Sarah Millar. Millar attended the University of Toronto and graduated with an average of 98% in all his subjects. He chose to study law, passed the bar examination at Osgoode Hall in 1884 and opened up his own law office in Toronto.

== Business career ==
=== The BC Express Company and the Millar Addition ===
In 1897, Millar purchased the BC Express Company from Stephen Tingley and took over the government mail delivery contracts for the Cariboo region in British Columbia.

When it was announced that the construction of the Grand Trunk Pacific Railway would go through Fort George (later named Prince George) Millar expanded the company's services to Fort George and built two sternwheelers, the BX and the BC Express. Millar also foresaw that Fort George would become a major centre in Northern British Columbia and he made arrangements to purchase the First Nations reserve at Fort George. However, the railway was already planning to purchase the property and they convinced the Department of Indian Affairs to cancel their negotiations with Millar. When Millar took the railway to court, the railway agreed to sell him 200 acres (0.81 km^{2}) of the property, which became known as the Millar Addition.

=== Horse racing ===
Millar owned racehorses, including the 1915 King's Plate-winning horse Tartarean. At the time of his death, he owned seven horses, including Troutlet, which went on to win the 1927 King's Plate, under different ownership. By then the executors of his Millar estate had sold his horses including Troutlet. In the 1910s, Millar had planned to build a racetrack in Kingston, Jamaica, where he holidayed, but abandoned the idea. In 1912, he had made arrangements with the builder of the Belmont Park racetrack, C. W. Leavitt to design the track. Millar was an investor in Kenilworth Park Racetrack, built just outside Windsor, Ontario, in 1916.

== Death ==
Millar died in his law office in the Crown Life Building at Yonge and Colborne Streets on October 31, 1926, of a stroke. He was discussing a case with Charles Kemp, a law associate, when he collapsed. Millar died before a doctor could arrive. Millar was buried in the family plot in Aylmer. He had not married and had no descendants and his parents had both predeceased him. His funeral was held at his home on 75 Scarborough Road in the Beaches district of Toronto, attended by many other members of the legal profession. When his executors filed his will for probate, Millar's estate was estimated to be worth CA$322,309 (1926) (equivalent to CA$5.75 million in 2025).

His death coincided with the disappearance of several books of accounting of O'Keefe Brewery. At the time the government of Canada contended that O'Keefe was $175,000 in arrears on sales taxes. The claim had been made to O'Keefe earlier in October 1926. The Royal Customs Commission held an inquiry in March 1937 and evidence was given that Millar had sent for the books to be delivered to his office. However, a search of his office, home and the company did not turn up the books, according to his associate Charles Kemp. O'Keefe was suspended from brewing "strong beer" during the dispute, until it provided the books to the commission. O'Keefe offered a reward for the return of the books and continued with its other activities. In May 1927, O'Keefe appealed for a reinstatement of its licence. F. H. Phippen, the president of the company testified that Millar, the president of O'Keefe in October 1926, did not want to give up the books to the commission and proposed an injunction. Phippen was in favour of giving up the books to the commission. Phippen described Millar as "a lawyer and an honourable man", and that he had only thought that Millar had put them away for safekeeping.

== Character ==
Though highly successful in the law and in his investments, Millar was known for his love of jokes and pranks which played on people's greed. One favourite was to leave money on a sidewalk and watch from a hiding place as passers-by furtively pocketed it. As a law student, Millar was jilted once by a girl of a prominent family and never had a serious relationship again. Millar was known to sleep on the veranda outside his house in all weather, to "keep himself hard". In life, he was never known to have given to any charity. The only club Millar was a member of was the Royal Canadian Yacht Club.

Abe Orpen, when informed about his mention in Millar's will, discussed his working relationship with Millar over many transactions. According to Orpen, the two always made verbal agreements, never on paper. Orpen distrusted Millar, who would always look for some loophole in a contract, though never broke his word.

== Will ==
Millar's final prank was his will, which says in part:

This Will is necessarily uncommon and capricious because I have no dependents or near relations and no duty rests upon me to leave any property at my death and what I do leave is proof of my folly in gathering and retaining more than I required in my lifetime.

— Charles Millar,

The will had several unusual bequests:

- Three men who were known to despise each other (T. P. Galt, KC; J. D. Montgomery and James Haverson, KC) were granted joint lifetime tenancy in Millar's vacation home in Jamaica, on condition that they live in the property together.
- To each practicing Protestant minister in Toronto, and every Orange Lodge in Toronto, a share of O'Keefe Brewery stock, a Catholic business, if they participated in its management and drew on its dividends.
- Two anti-horse-racing advocates (Hon. William Raney, Reverend Samuel Chown) and a man who detested the Ontario Jockey Club (Abe Orpen) were to receive a share of Ontario Jockey Club stock, provided they are shareholders in three years. Raney's and Chown's share were eventually given to charity and Orpen accepted his share.
- Each duly ordained Christian minister in Walkerville, Sandwich, and Windsor, "except Spracklin, who shot a hotelkeeper" was to receive a share of the Kenilworth Park Racetrack, located just outside Windsor, Ontario.

The home in Kingston, Jamaica, had already been sold by Millar. It was not in his estate when it was submitted for probate.

The bequest to the Protestant ministers of O'Keefe stock was a problem to resolve. The corporate structure of O'Keefe was such that Millar's share of the company was not in shares, but in a share of a holding company that controlled O'Keefe. He only had one actual share in the O'Keefe Brewery Ltd. The 99 ministers and the 103 Orange Lodges who accepted the bequest, did so upon the sale of O'Keefe in 1928 for $1.35 million, in an agreement with the executors. The legatees each received $56.38.

In October 1928, five pastors in Windsor claimed the bequest of the Kenilworth shares. The value of the shares was hard to judge, as the stock did not trade publicly. One estimation was that they were worth less than one cent each. The racetrack would close within a decade.

== The Great Stork Derby ==
The tenth and final clause of his will was the largest. It required that the balance of Millar's estate was to be converted to cash ten years after his death and given to the Toronto woman who gave birth to the most children in that time. In the event of a tie, the bequest would be divided equally. The resulting contest became known as the Great Stork Derby.

The Supreme Court of Canada validated the will; Millar had prepared it with care. The will survived ten years of litigation, including attempts by Millar's distant relatives to have it declared invalid, and the Derby continued uninterrupted. Because of Millar's long-term investments, particularly one of land adjacent to the Detroit–Windsor Tunnel that turned a $2 investment into over $100,000, his estate increased drastically during the ten years, and was worth $568,106 when it was finally liquidated. Its value was enhanced as it accumulated during a deflationary economic period.

Most of this prize was shared by four Toronto women who each had nine children, receiving $110,000 each, although three of the four had to pay back to the City of Toronto relief money they had collected. The estate also paid $12,500 each to two women with dubious claims to a share in the prize so as to end litigation.

The contest inspired a Canadian made-for-television movie, The Stork Derby, which starred Megan Follows.

It was speculated that Millar prepared this clause in his will to outrage the moral sense of Canadians and lead to reforms such as ending prohibitions against birth control.
