= Man o' War Cup =

American horse-racing trophy

The Man o' War Cup, originally the Kenilworth Gold Cup, is a solid gold trophy that commemorates the winners of the Travers Stakes, held each August at Saratoga Race Course in Saratoga Springs, New York, United States. Since 1936, Winners of the Travers, affectionately called the "Mid-Summer Derby" have their name inscribed on the original and receive a gold-plated replica of the Cup.

The Cup is named after the 1920 winner of the Stakes race, Man o' War. Man o' War went on to defeat the famed Sir Barton, the first winner of the American Triple Crown, at a special match race at Kenilworth Park in Windsor, Ontario, Canada. It was for that race that Samuel D. Riddle received the trophy, which was later donated to Saratoga by Mrs. Sam (Elizabeth) Riddle in 1936. William Woodward's Granville won the 1936 Travers Stakes and was the first to be presented with the Cup. The cup was designed by Tiffany & Co. for Abe Orpen, owner and manager of Kenilworth, at a cost of $5,000, for the famous match race.

Each year the original gold trophy is presented by a member of the Riddle family and either the Governor or Lt. Governor of the State of New York. A replica is made each year and that gold-plated smaller version of the permanent trophy is given for permanent possession to the owners of the winning horse.

== See also ==
- August Belmont Trophy
