= Abe Orpen =

Canadian businessman (1854–1937)

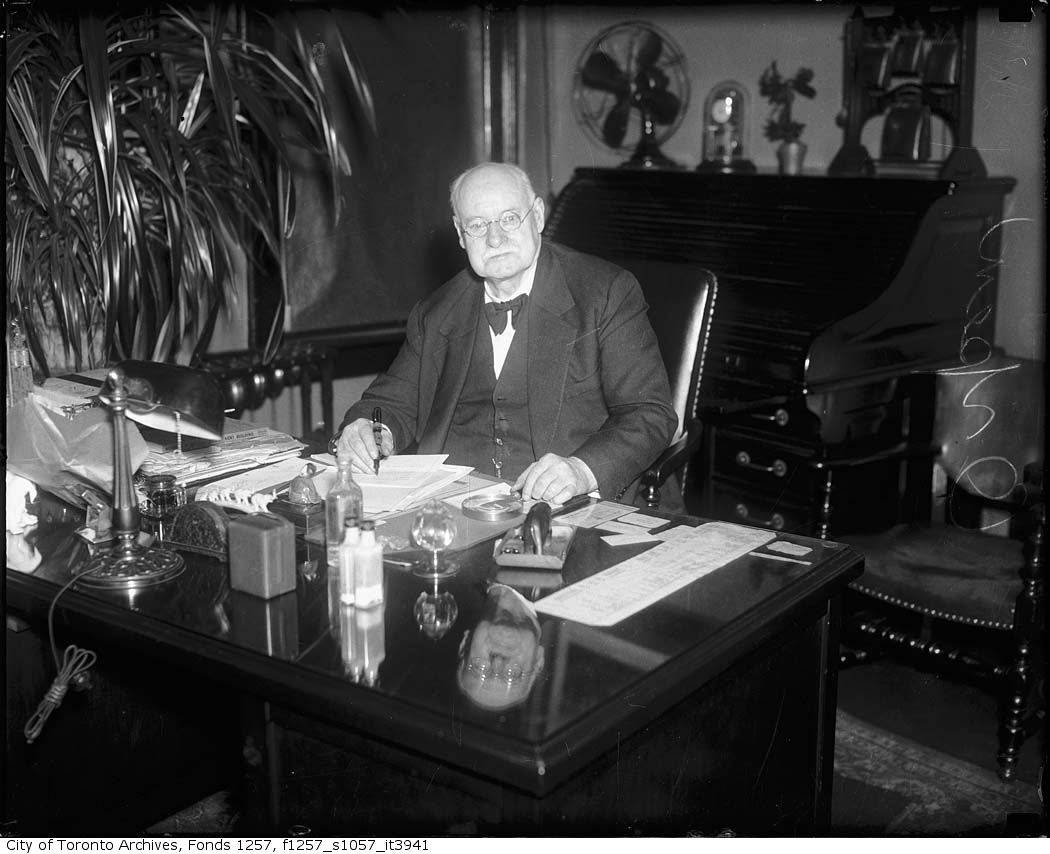
- Abe Orpen in his office in 1930
- Born: February 9, 1854; Toronto, Canada West
- Died: September 22, 1937 (aged 83); Toronto, Ontario, Canada
- Occupation: businessman
- Spouse: Isabella Srigley (1854-1943)
- Children: Abraham Orpen Jr; Fred Orpen; Mrs T. Ambrose Woods
- Honours: Canadian Horse Racing Hall of Fame (1980)

Abraham 'Abe' Michael Orpen (February 9, 1854 – September 22, 1937) was a Canadian businessman, best known for his ownership of several horse-racing tracks in Ontario, Canada. Born in Toronto, Orpen first worked as a carpenter, became a hotel keeper, owned several construction-related businesses, then branched into horse-racing. He owned the Dufferin Park Racetrack, Hillcrest Racetrack and Long Branch Racetrack, and was a partner in the Kenilworth Park Racetrack at Windsor, Ontario, and the Thorncliffe Park Raceway in Leaside, Ontario. Orpen was well known as a facilitator of gambling, first at his hotel, and eventually at a casino in Mimico, Ontario. After his death, his family continued the horse-racing businesses until the 1950s, when they sold their tracks during a time of consolidation of racetracks in Ontario.

== Early life ==
Orpen was born in Toronto in 1854, at the family home at Oxford Street and Spadina Avenue. He was one of six children. His parents both came from northern Ireland; his father Samuel Orpen was a railway paymaster from Kilmairn, Killowen, and his mother Sarah was from McGuire's Bridge, Enniskillen. After his father died in 1863, his mother operated a hotel at Queen's Wharf at Bathurst and Front Streets. After finishing public school, Abraham would work as a carpenter. Disliking carpentry, Orpen quit and worked as a dishwasher in the hotel. Orpen was a cousin of painter William Orpen.

== Career ==
After marrying Isabella Srigley of Newmarket in 1874, Orpen bought the Alhambra Hotel, located on the south-west corner of Church Street and King Street East. It had three bedrooms and a bar. It became a den for poker, dice and bookmaking. According to Orpen, keeping a book and writing a sheet for Toronto bookies "was not legal, and not quite illegal" at the time. Orpen tried several businesses, including the Simpson Brick Company, a lumber company and mining properties. Although all of his non-gambling businesses failed, he was able to build his home in 1900 at Sherbourne and Carlton Streets using bricks from his brick company.

Orpen's first venture into horse-racing was the purchase of several horses. It went badly; three out of four horses died after falls. He got out of owning horses but did not get out of the gambling business.

In 1907, he and Thomas Hare launched Dufferin Park Racetrack on land leased for 20 years. The Orpen-Hare partnership was built out of necessity. Orpen was ill when the venture launched and Hare became the operator, the two splitting the profits. The two were dead set against paper contracts and worked without one until 1929 when another Orpen illness necessitated a statement of their business association. The two detested the idea of using separate lawyers and compromised by using two from the same law firm. When the original Dufferin Park charter was revoked, Orpen went directly to Prime Minister Wilfrid Laurier, who personally authorized a new charter immediately.

The second race track that Orpen invested in was Hillcrest in Toronto, at Bathurst and Davenport. Opened in 1912, it operated only until 1916. During World War I, race tracks were closed and Orpen was forced to sell the property. The site is now the largest vehicle yard of the Toronto Transit Commission.

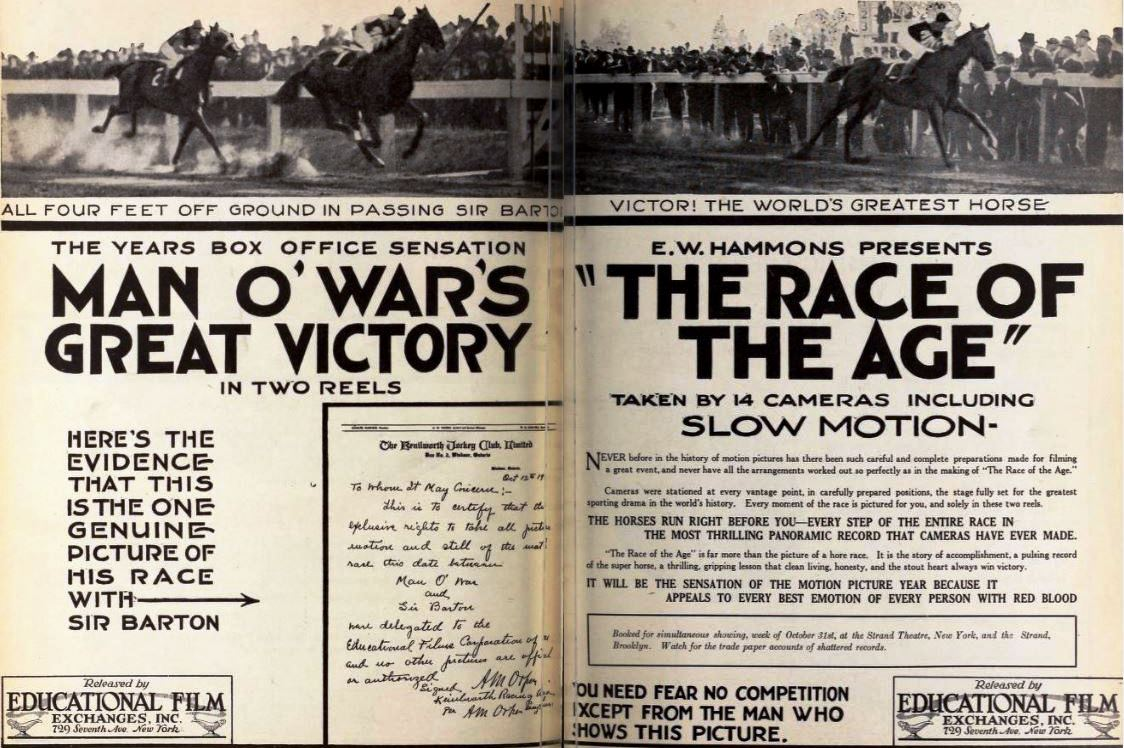
"The Race of the Age"

In 1916, Orpen, along with partners Thomas Hare, Charles Millar and H. D. Brown opened the Kenilworth Park Racetrack in Windsor, Ontario. In 1920, Orpen out-bid several racetracks to land a match race between Man o' War and Triple Crown winner Sir Barton at the track. The event was so highly anticipated that it became the first horserace to be filmed in its entirety, with the resulting footage later shown in movie theatres across the country. The race was originally intended to be a face-off between the three great horses of the time: Man o' War, Sir Barton and Exterminator. However, the owners of Sir Barton and Man o' War agreed to a distance of 1 1/4 miles, which was too short for Exterminator to run his best, and agreed to a weight-for-age format, under which the older Exterminator would concede weight to Man o' War. Therefore, Exterminator was not entered, and in fact, raced that same day on a different track. Orpen put up a $75,000 purse and a $5,000 gold cup, designed by Tiffany & Co. of New York. (The gold cup, now known as the Man o' War Cup, continues to be used, presented to the winner of the Travers Stakes at Saratoga Race Course since 1936.) The crowd at the track for the race was estimated at more than 30,000 and it bet $220,00 on the race. The track held its last meet in 1935. The grandstand was demolished in 1939 and the site was developed as a housing subdivision.

In the 1920s, Orpen established the National Sporting Club gambling casino in Mimico, just outside the Toronto city limits on Lakeshore Road west of the Humber River. According to Orpen, the police always tipped him off when a raid was occurring. "Club members had keys; the police were the only ones that rang the doorbell."

In 1924, Orpen bought land in Etobicoke Township west of Toronto and opened the Long Branch Racetrack. Although its opening caused a dispute with the Government of Ontario, Orpen and Hare owned the track until Orpen's death in 1937 and Hare's death in 1938. Orpen's sons operated the track until it was sold along with Dufferin Park in the 1950s. In 1935, Orpen, his son Fred and Hare arranged to hold races in London, Ontario, leasing the track at the Queen's Park fairgrounds.

In 1937, Orpen arrived at the National Sporting Club early one Monday morning. When he arrived, he was held hostage by three men who had broken in but could not crack the safe. Orpen could not open the safe, not knowing the combination. The robbers then demanded $5000. Orpen negotiated with them, promising them $1000 and that he would not reveal their identities. They went to his bank and Orpen withdrew the money. Orpen never revealed their identities. He is reputed to have told them to get another job and return to his club, where he could potentially recover his losses.

== Character ==
Orpen was well known for his many small acts of philanthropy and charity. He financed the operation of a soup kitchen for two years, although he shut it down after people complained that the soup was not good enough. Orpen opened his office on Fridays to whoever needed help. On one such occasion, when Canadian boxer Sammy Luftspring could not afford to go to the 1935 Canadian Boxing Championship, Orpen gave him $50.

On several occasions, Orpen refunded a gambler's losses when it became known that the gambler had gambled their rent or food money away. Orpen never recommended that people gamble; only that he would take their bets if they wished to bet. In 1890, sports writer William Hewitt bet with Orpen at amounts he could not afford. Told that Hewitt made $9 a week, Orpen offered to let Hemitt bet privately with him for one month, betting on any horse in North America at 2–1 odds, one bet a day. After one month, Hewitt owed $18, or half his salary, which Orpen offered to forgive. Hewitt paid the debt and learned his lesson, "It was a cheap lesson and saved me thousands," wrote Hewitt. Although Orpen was involved in gambling when it was illegal, his gambling club and racetracks did not open on Sundays when opening on Sundays in Toronto was illegal. Orpen was also known for his lack of racial discrimination. Blacks and whites worked side by side at the Orpen tracks. Facilities were the same for both.

On his 80th birthday, Orpen received congratulations from the Mayor of Toronto, the Premier of Ontario and the Prime Minister of Canada. Orpen was quoted as saying "I will start to think I am a respectable citizen if this keeps up."

== Death ==
On July 31, 1937, Orpen had a heart seizure while in the Metropolitan Racing Association (MRA) offices at King and Bay Streets. On September 22, 1937, Orpen died in the family home at the corner of Carlton Street and Sherbourne Street after a lingering illness. At the time of his death, Orpen and his wife Isabella had been married for 63 years. Orpen's funeral service was held at the Cathedral Church of St. James and he was interred in St. James Cemetery. When the MRA vacated its offices at King and Bay in December 1938, they kept the hat rack and hats that Abe had left the day he had the heart attack and placed it in their new office in the Crown Life building. Fred kept it in the office until the MRA was sold.

Abraham and Isabella were the parents of nine children. At the time of Orpen's death, his wife, two sons, Abraham Jr and Fred, and a daughter, Mrs T. Ambrose Woods, survived him. The two sons took over the racing businesses and operated them until they were sold in 1955 to the Ontario Jockey Club. The Orpen home at 380 Sherbourne Street is a designated heritage property. It has been converted into an apartment building.

== Legacy ==
Two stakes races that originated at the Orpen tracks continue to be run. The Canadian International Stakes and the Cup and Saucer Stakes, originally the Mrs. Orpen's Cup and Saucer Stakes. In 1954, the Orpen Memorial wading pool in Dufferin Grove Park was opened, donated by his son Fred Orpen. In 1980, Orpen was inducted into the Canadian Horse Racing Hall of Fame.
