= Kenilworth Park (Portland, Oregon) =

Public park in Portland, Oregon, U.S.

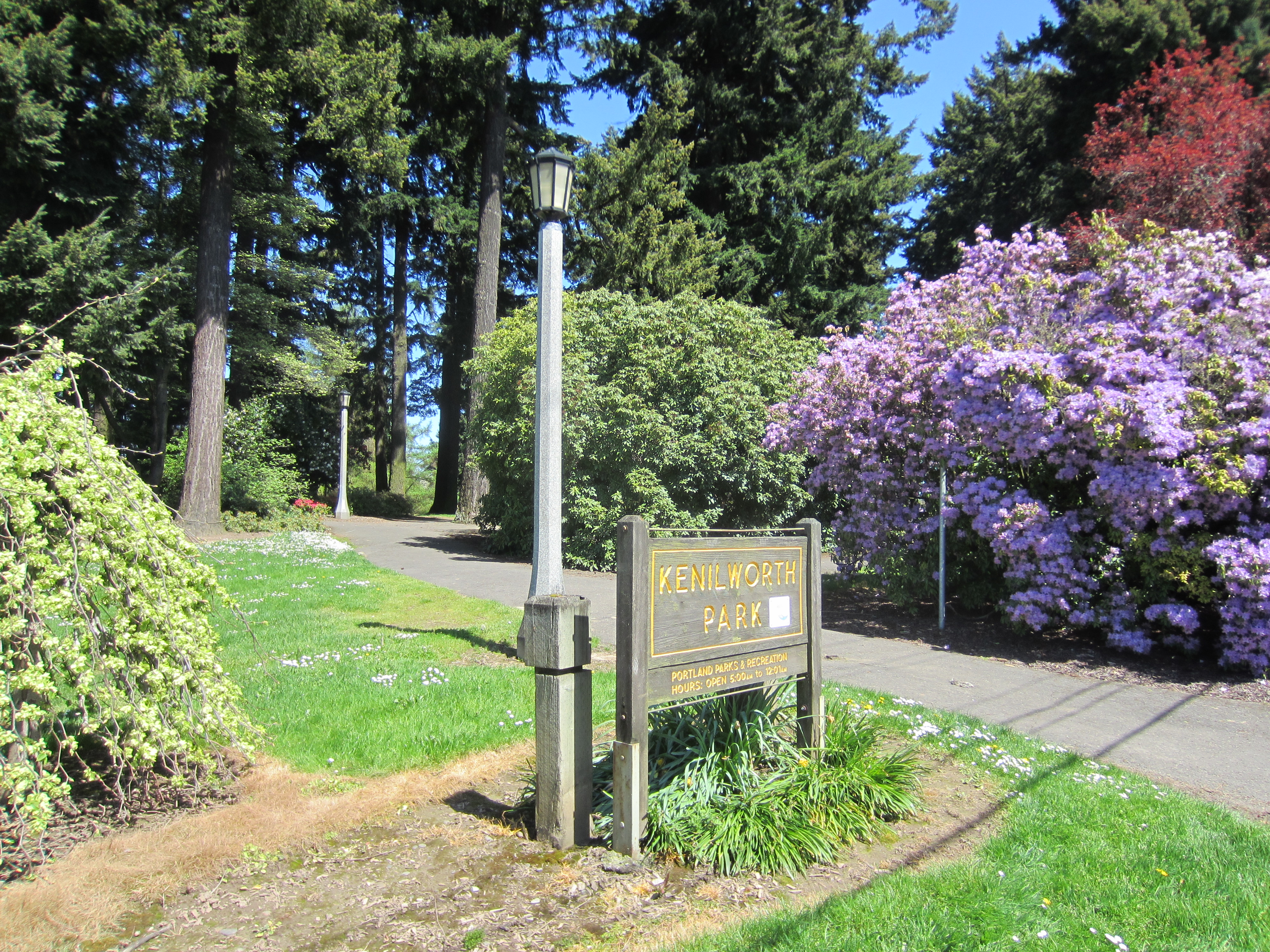
- Park signage, 2012

- Location within Portland, Oregon
- Location: SE 34th Ave. and Holgate Blvd. Portland, Oregon
- Coordinates: 45°29′29″N 122°37′52″W
- Area: 8.40 acres (3.40 ha)
- Operator: Portland Parks & Recreation

Kenilworth Park is a 8.4-acre (3.4 ha) public park in Portland, Oregon's Creston-Kenilworth neighborhood, in the United States. The park was acquired in 1909.
