= Great Stork Derby =

Contest held from 1926 to 1936

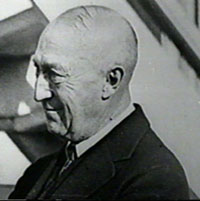
Charles Vance Millar, whose will sparked the Great Stork Derby

The Great Stork Derby was a contest held from 1926 to 1936. Female residents of Toronto, Ontario, Canada, competed to produce the most babies in order to qualify for an unusual bequest in a will.

== Background ==
The race was the product of a scheme by Charles Vance Millar (1854–1926), a Toronto lawyer, financier, and practical joker, who bequeathed the residue of his significant estate to the woman in Toronto who could produce the most children in the decade following his death.

It is one of many unusual bequests in his will, along with giving a vacation home in Jamaica to a group of three men who detested each other under the condition that they live in the estate together indefinitely, brewery stocks to a group of prominent teetotal Protestant ministers if they participated in its operations and collected its dividends, and jockey club stocks to a group of anti-horse-racing advocates.

Litigation over the validity of the contest was resolved when the Supreme Court of Canada upheld the clause's validity. The Court further held the clause did not encompass children born out of wedlock, or stillborn.

== Competition ==
Eleven families competed in the "baby race." Seven of them were disqualified, but eventually Judge William Edward Middleton ruled in favour of four mothers (Annie Katherine Smith, Kathleen Ellen Nagle, Lucy Alice Timleck and Isabel Mary Maclean) who each received $110,000 for their nine children ($2.35 million in 2025 dollars). Three of the four had to pay back relief money given to them by the City of Toronto government. Two of the disqualified candidates, Lillian Kenny and Pauline Mae Clarke, each received $12,500 out of court in exchange for abandoning pending appeals.

== In popular culture ==
The Canadian 2002 TV movie The Stork Derby, depicted the stories of Lillian Kenny, Pauline Mae Clarke and Grace Bagnato and starred Megan Follows. The film was based upon Elizabeth Wilton's book Bearing The Burden: The Great Toronto Stork Derby 1926–1938.

In 2016, Toronto's Muddy York Brewing Company produced a Stork Derby Stout as a nod to the unusual event.

In February 2019, the radio program This American Life covered the story in some detail.

The 2023 novel Prize Women by Caroline Lea is a fictionalized account of the Stork Derby, and includes several real-life figures as characters.
