= William James (photographer) =

English-Canadian photographer (1866–1948)

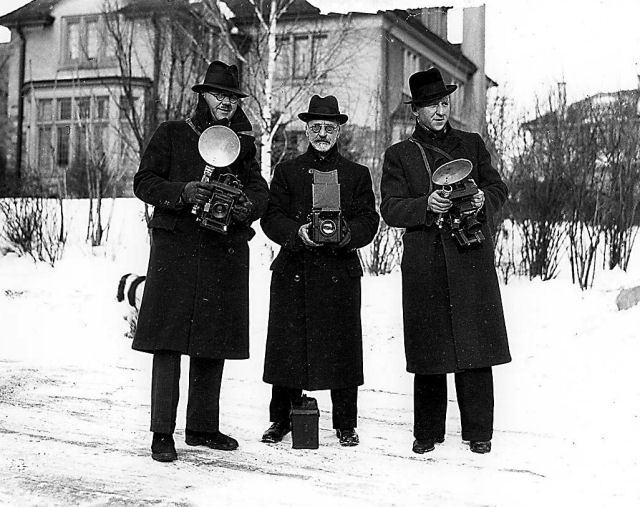
- Photographer William James and two of his sons in 1936
- Born: 1866; Walsall, United Kingdom
- Died: 1948 (aged 81–82)
- Occupation: Photographer
- Known for: Chronicling early 20th century Toronto through photographs

William James was an early and prolific photographer who chronicled Toronto, Ontario. His works have been widely collected and republished. James came to Canada, from England, in 1906, when he was forty years old. He and his wife immigrated with five children and seven dollars to their name.

He made freelance photography his occupation in 1909, and was the founding President of the Canadian Photographers Association. Between then and the end of the 1930s, hundreds of James' photographs appeared in publications such as The Toronto World, The Toronto Daily Star, and Chatelaine; he at one point sold pictures to all seven of the city's papers.

Mike Filey, the author of a long-running column in the Toronto Sun, on the history of Toronto, described James as a technical innovator. James invented a developer that would eliminate grain in his photographs, and wrote articles about his experiments with camera technology and chemistry.

James captured a photo of the first cable car to run across the whirlpool rapids of the Niagara River, which required him to shoot upside down with his Speed Graphic camera. He was also the first photographer in Canada to make an aerial movie, which he did from the open cockpit of a biplane.

The City of Toronto Archives hosts a collection of over 6,000 of James's photographs. His son Norman James became a press photographer for the Toronto Star.

== Gallery ==
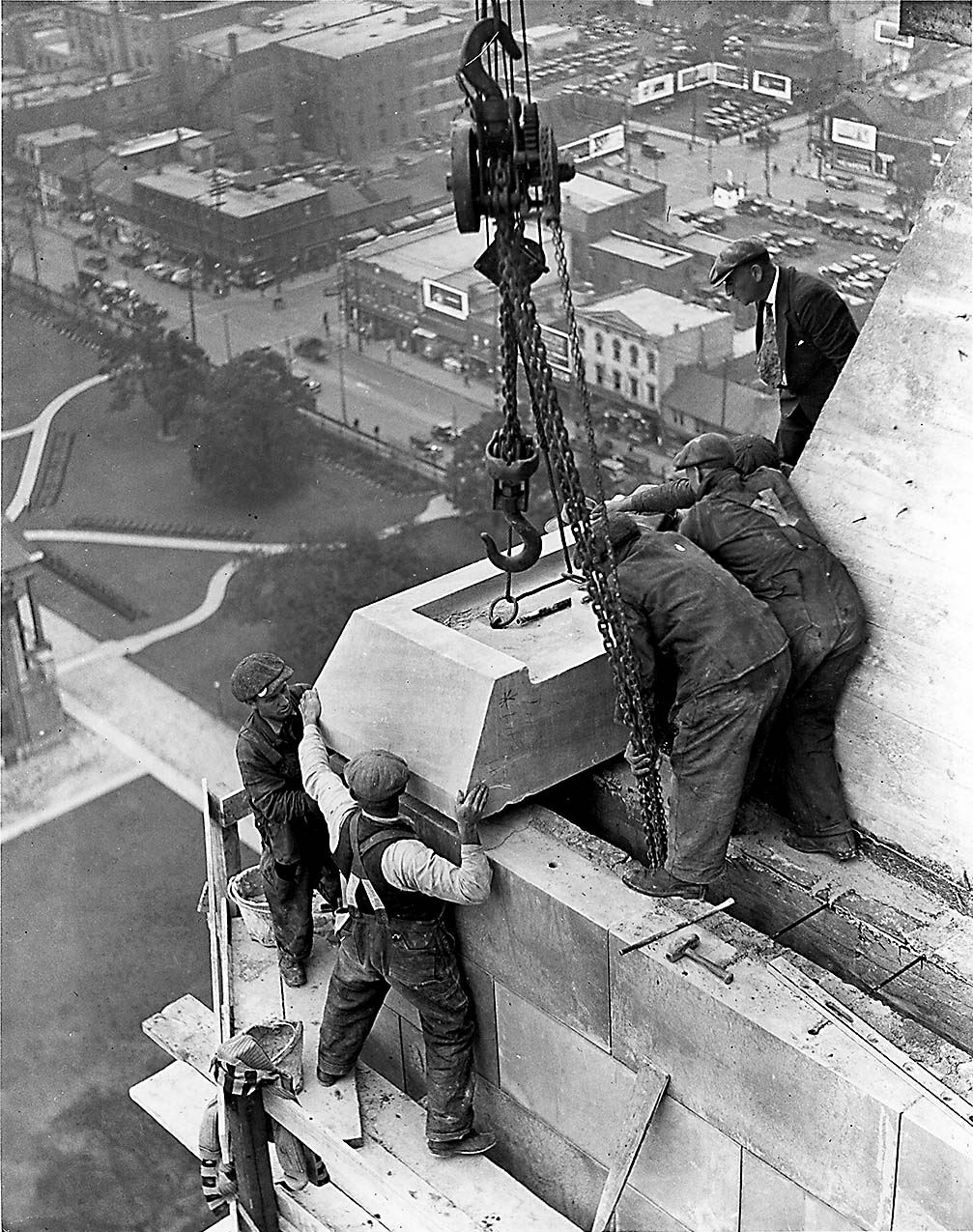
Canada Life Building Toronto, Ontario, Canada

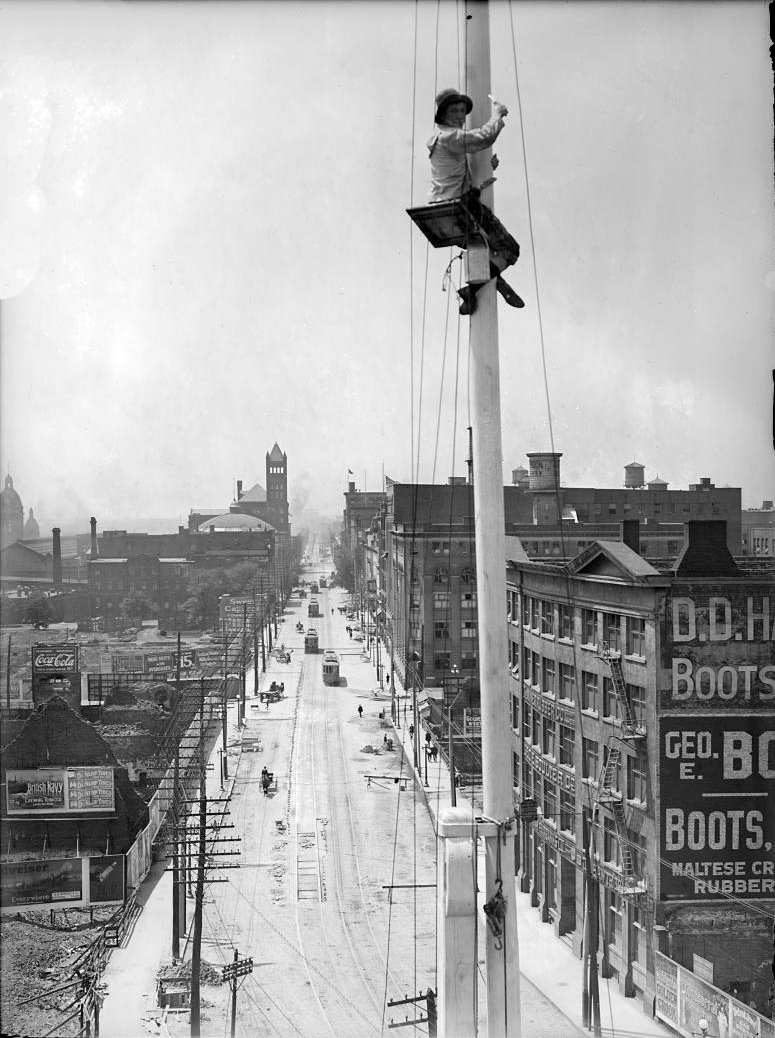
Flagpole painter with view looking west on Front Street

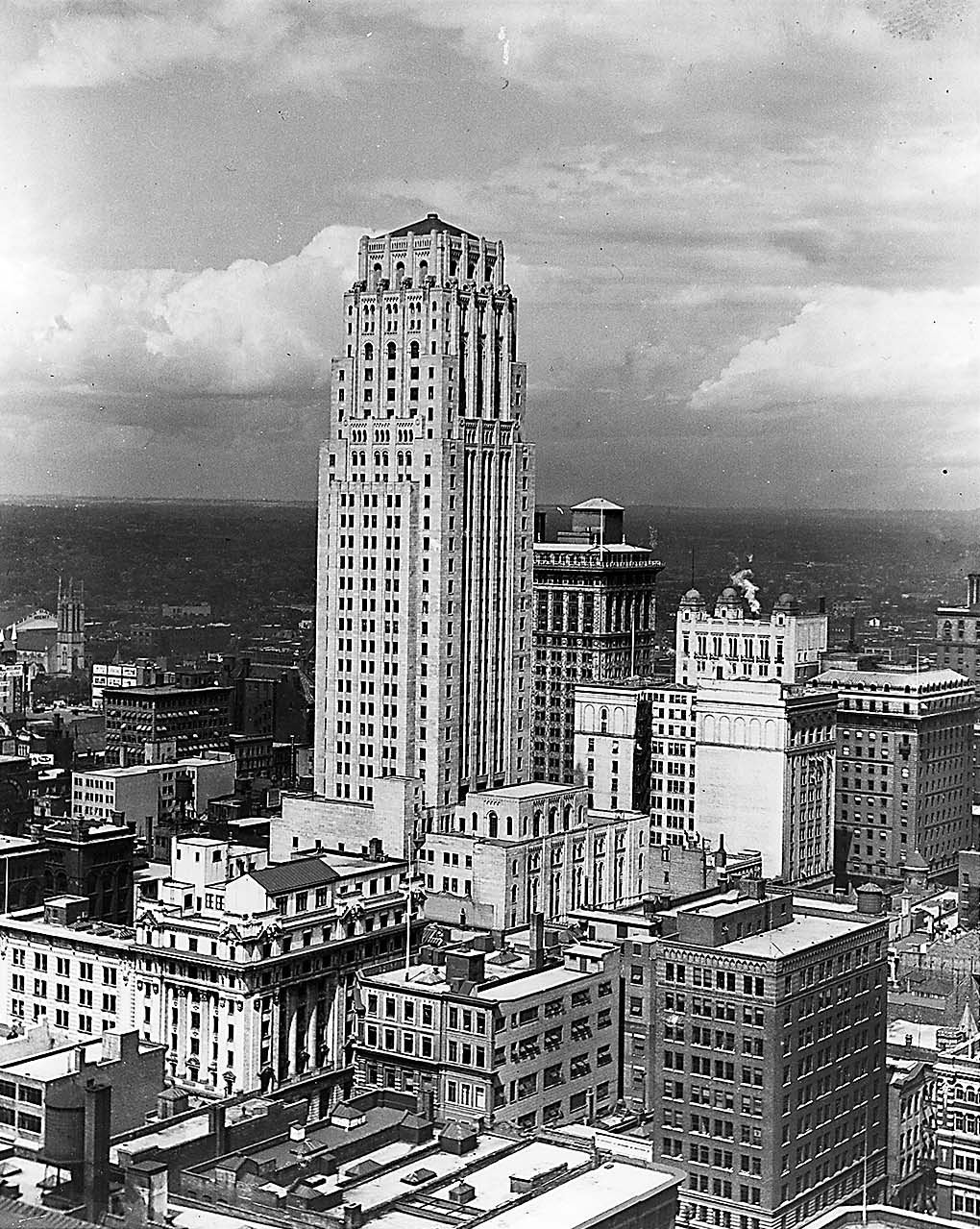
Bank of Commerce, 1930

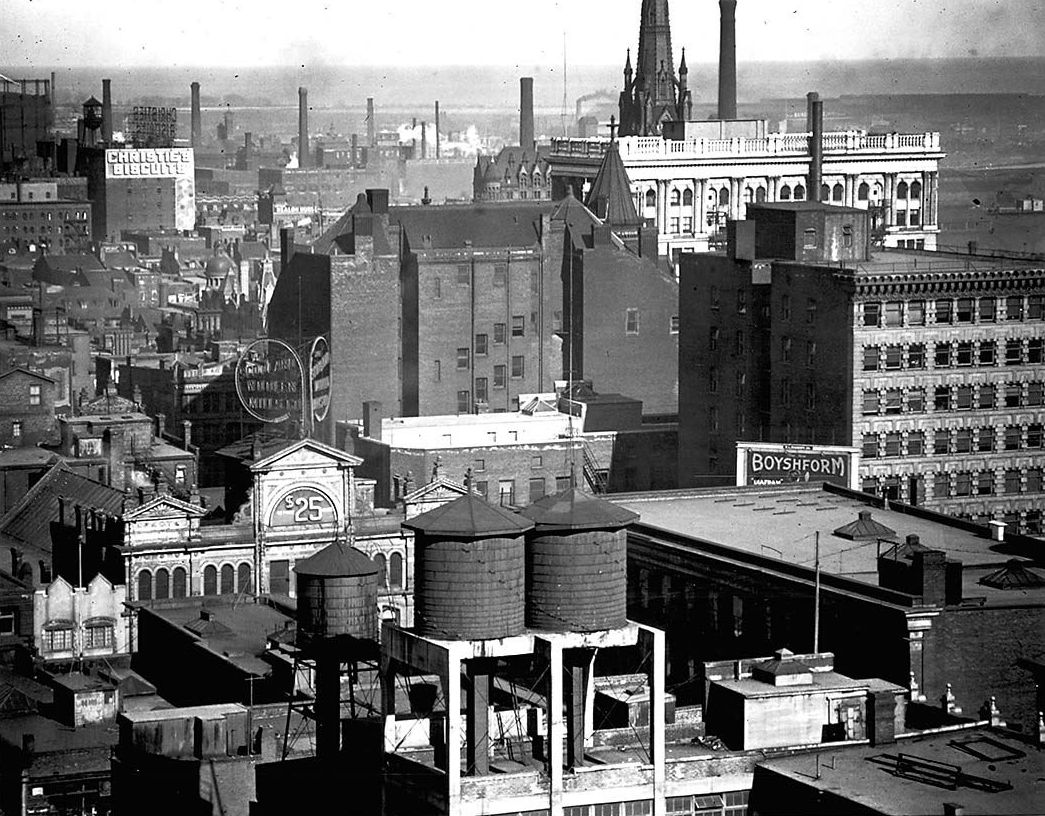
Looking southeast from Richmond and Bay streets

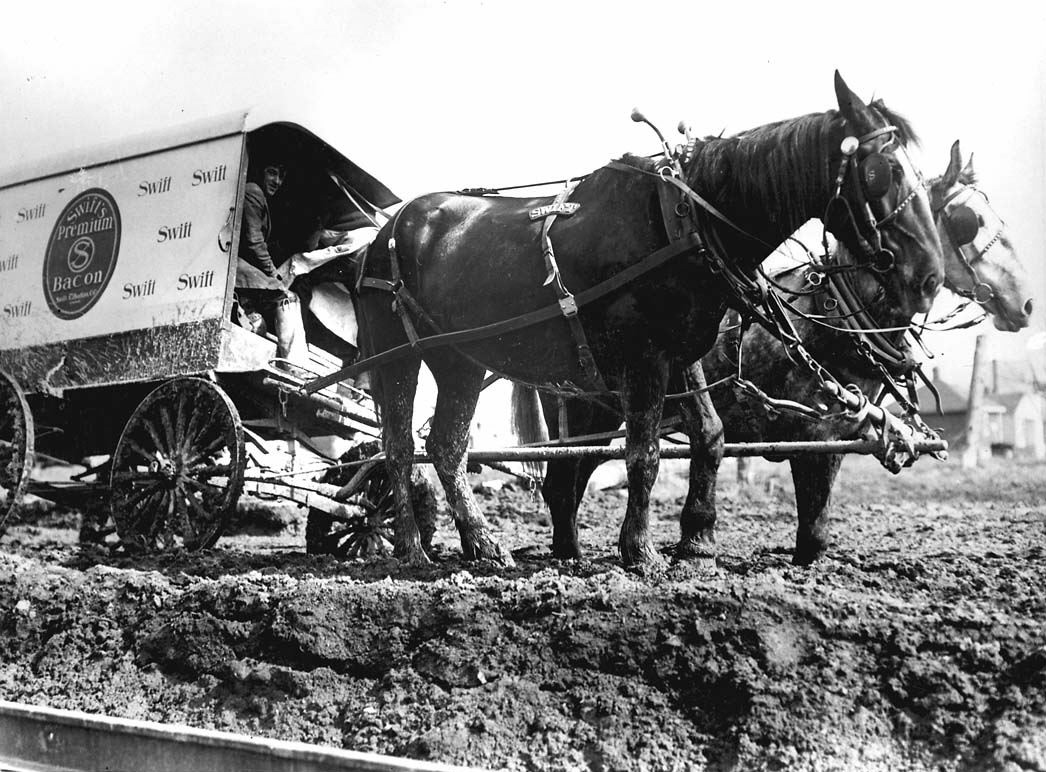
Horses and delivery wagon stuck in the mud

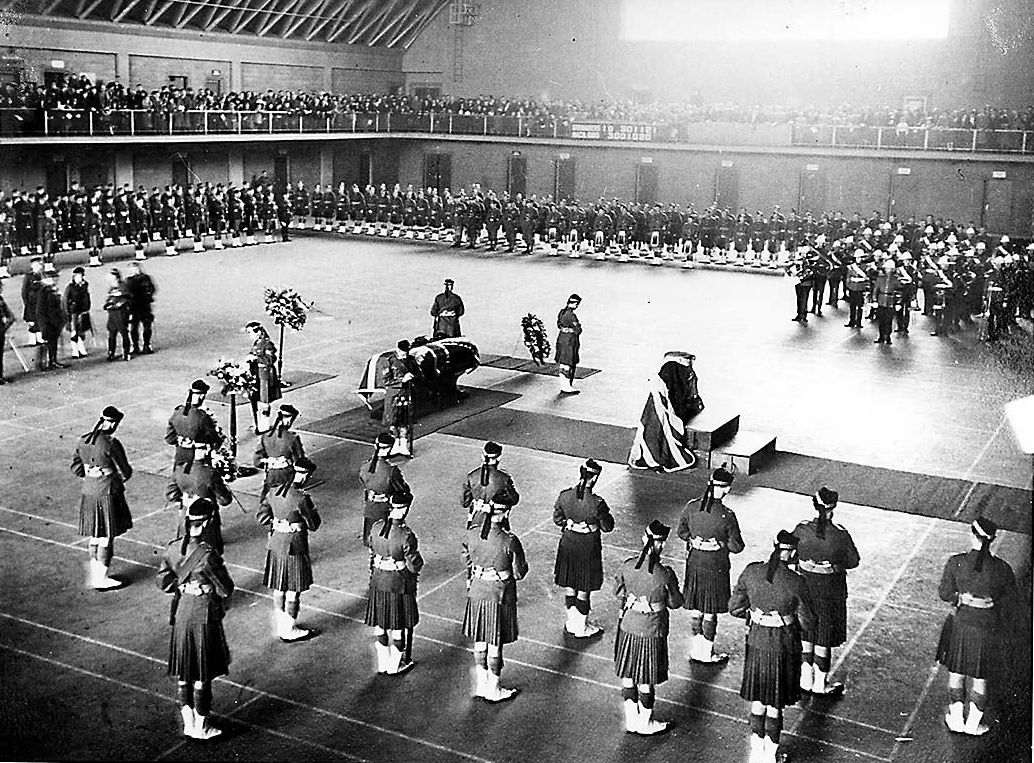
Sir Henry Pellatt's funeral at Toronto Armouries

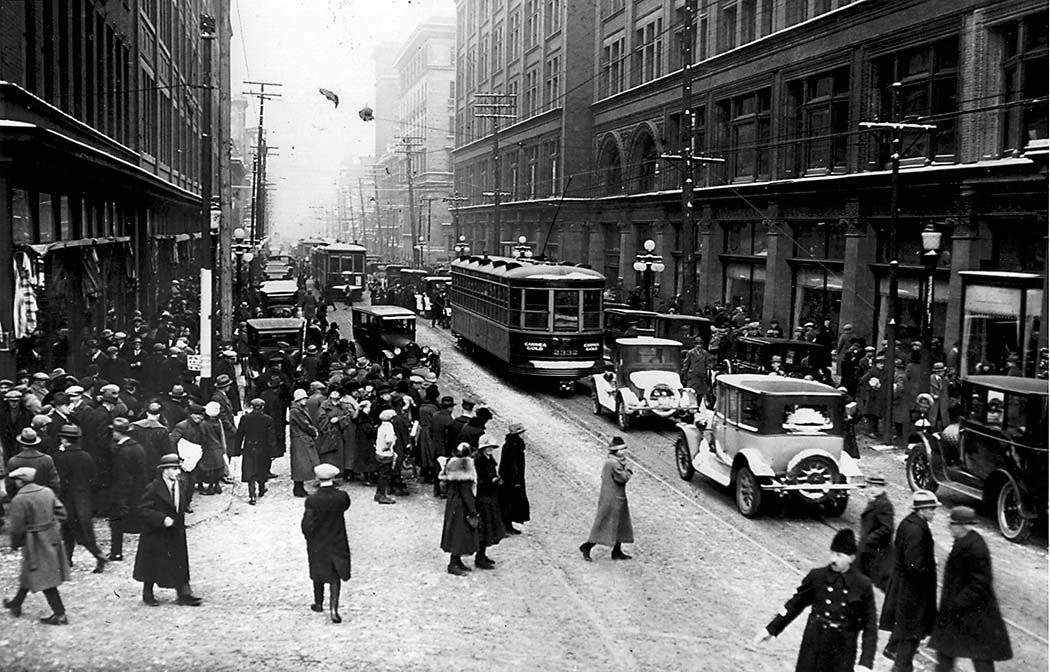
Toronto 1924

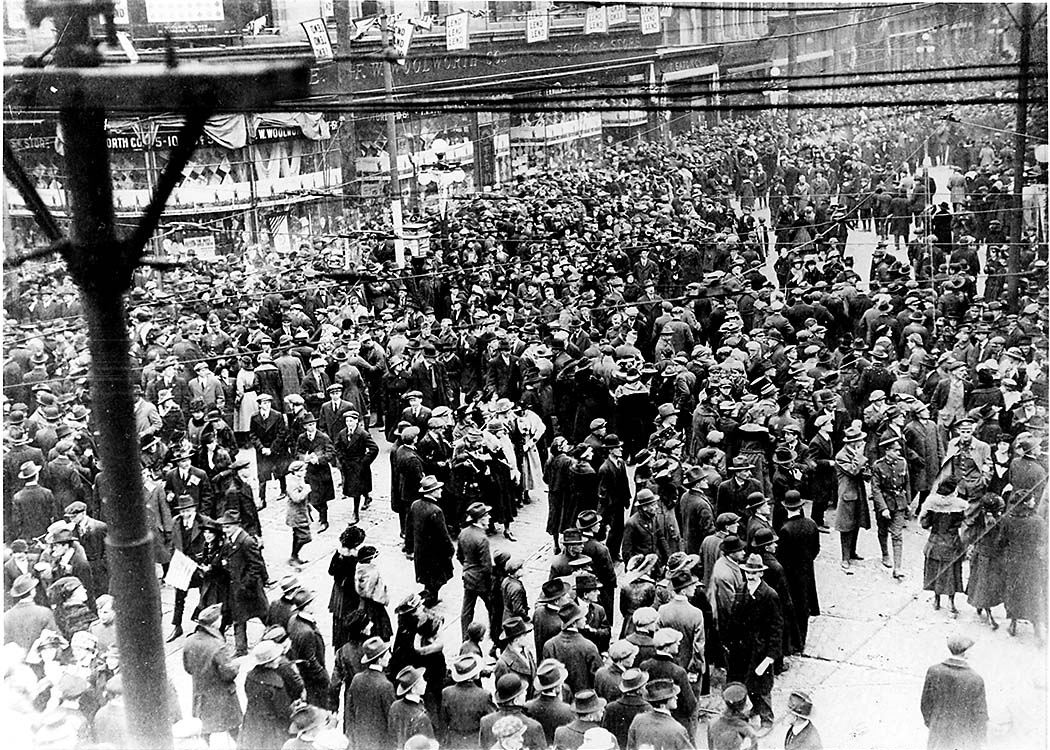
Toronto 1918

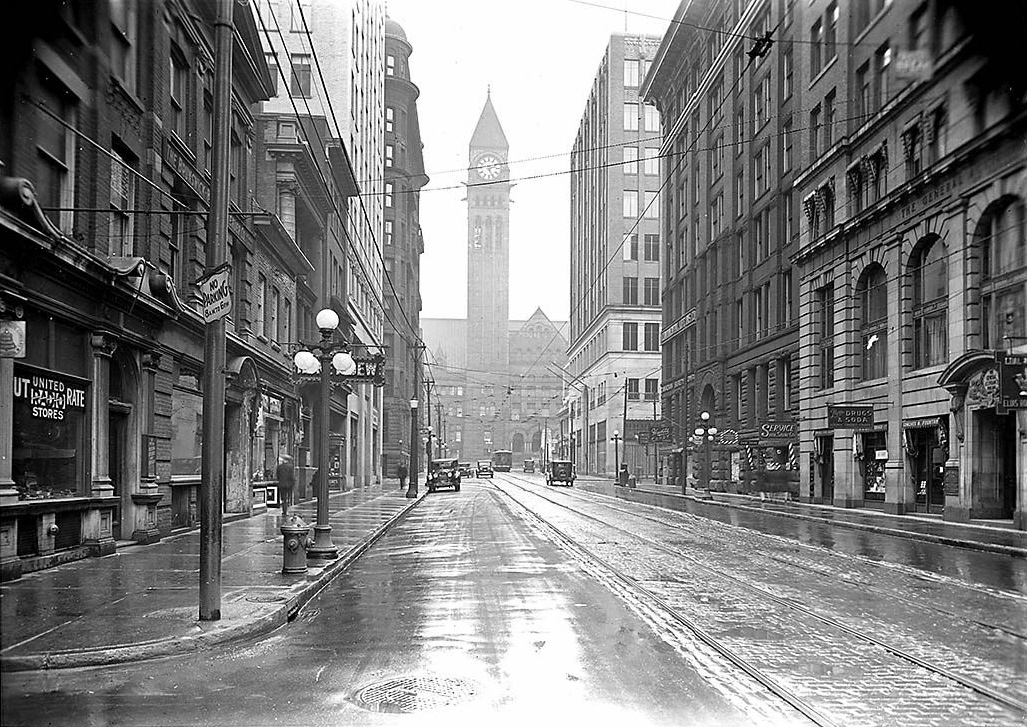
Toronto 1929

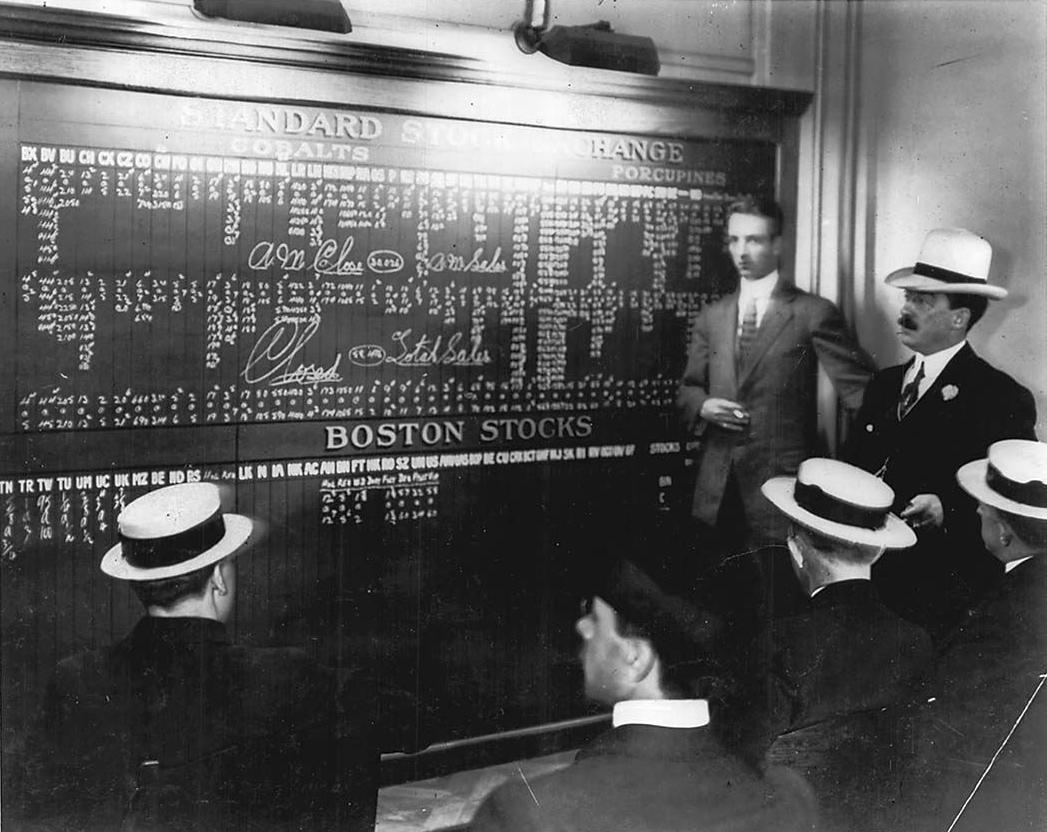
Board at the Toronto Stock Exchange

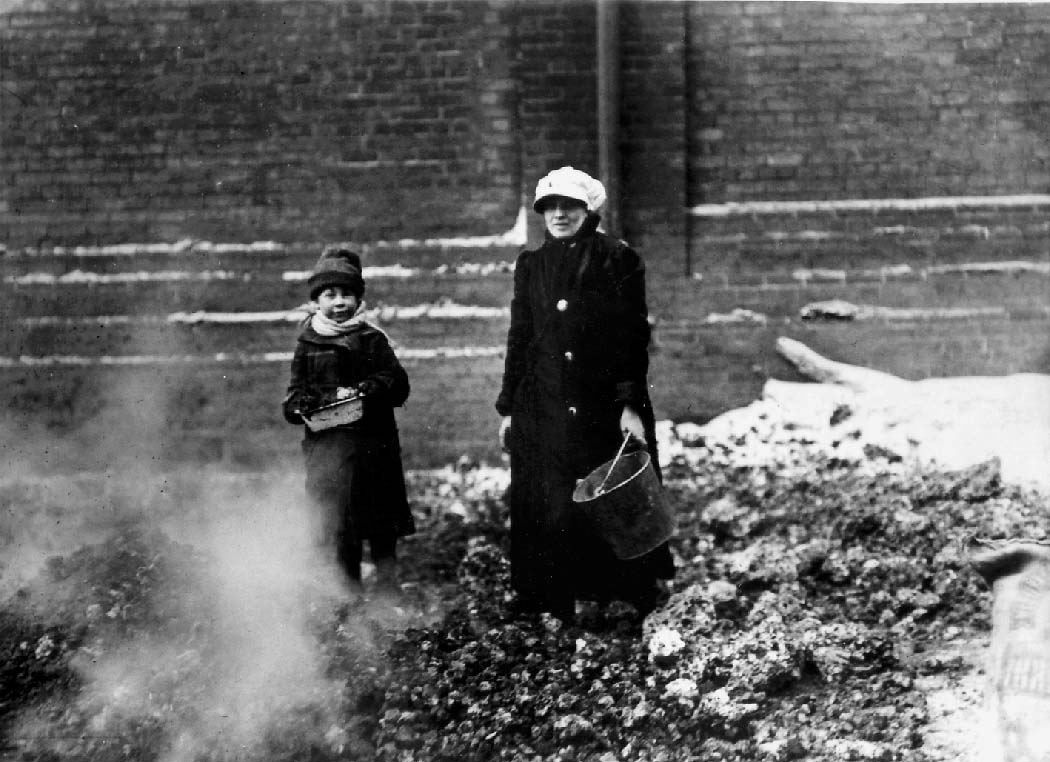
Child and adult collecting coal or coke

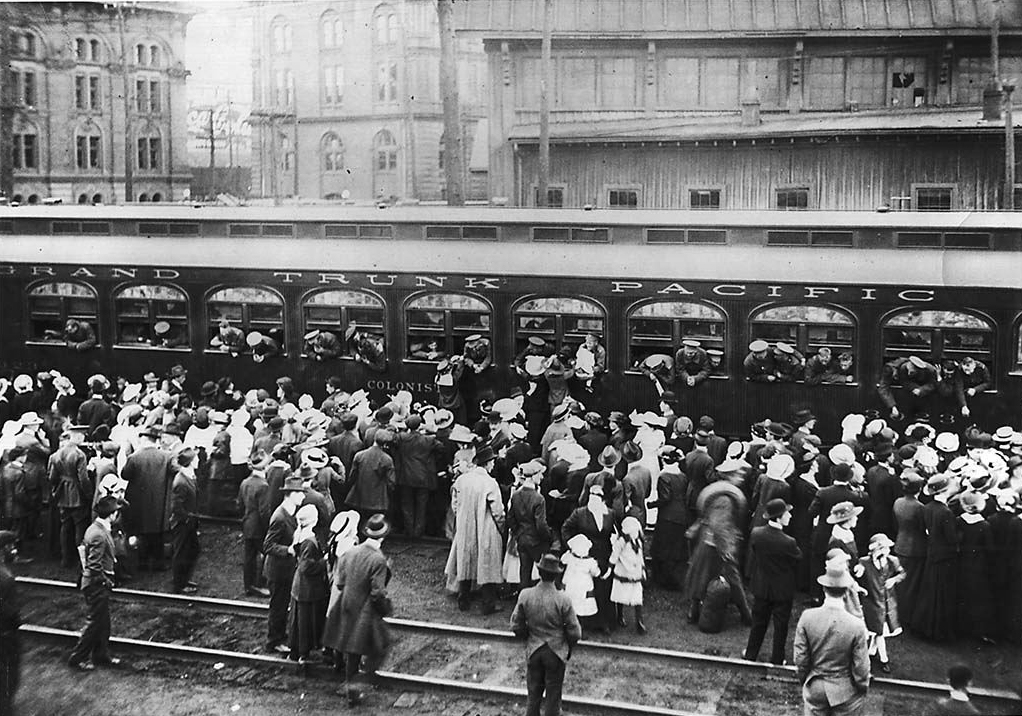
Crowds as soldiers leave Union Station 1914

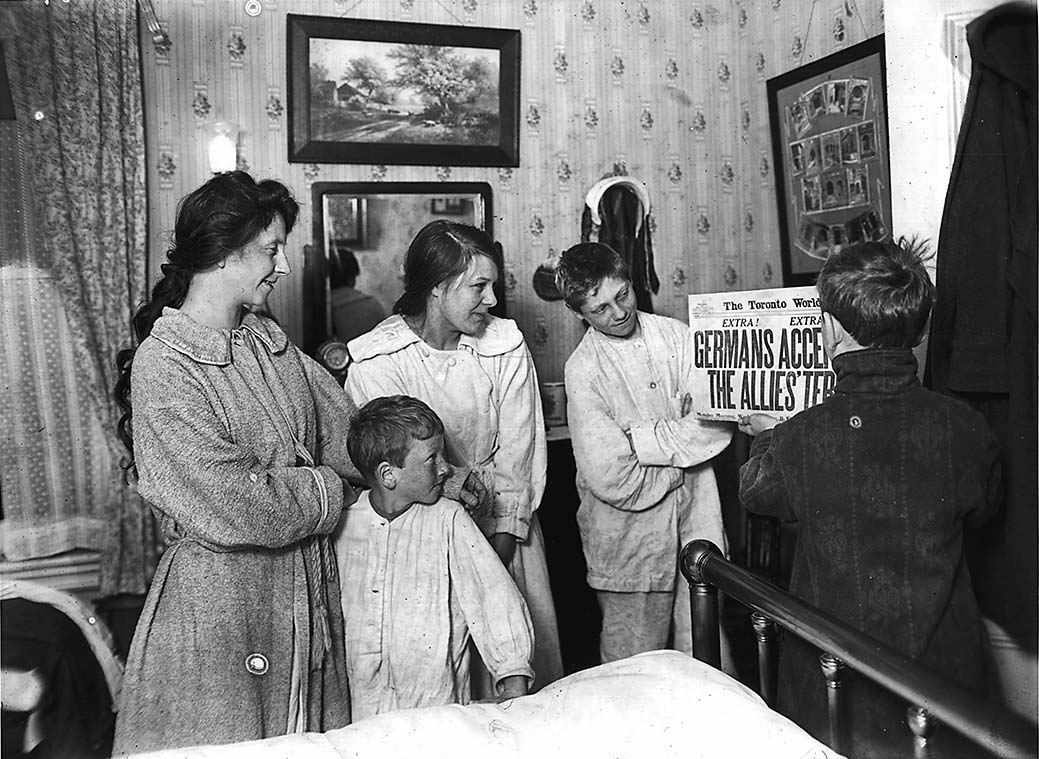
Family reads newspaper on Armistice Day

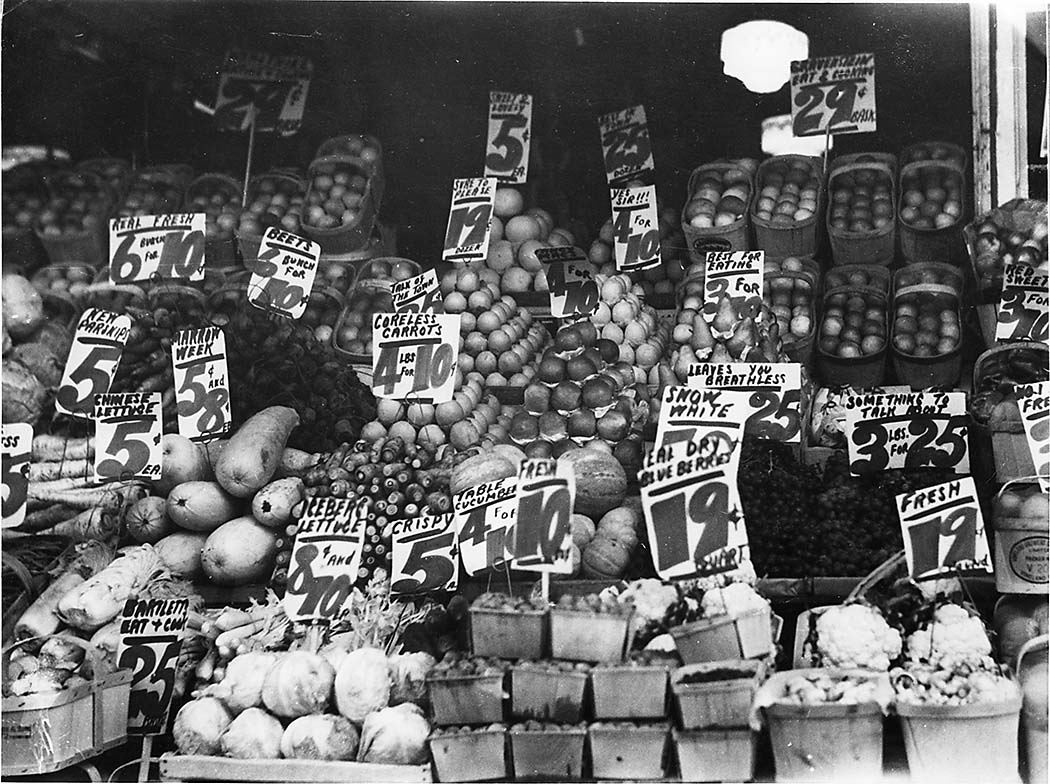
Fruit and vegetable store on Coxwell

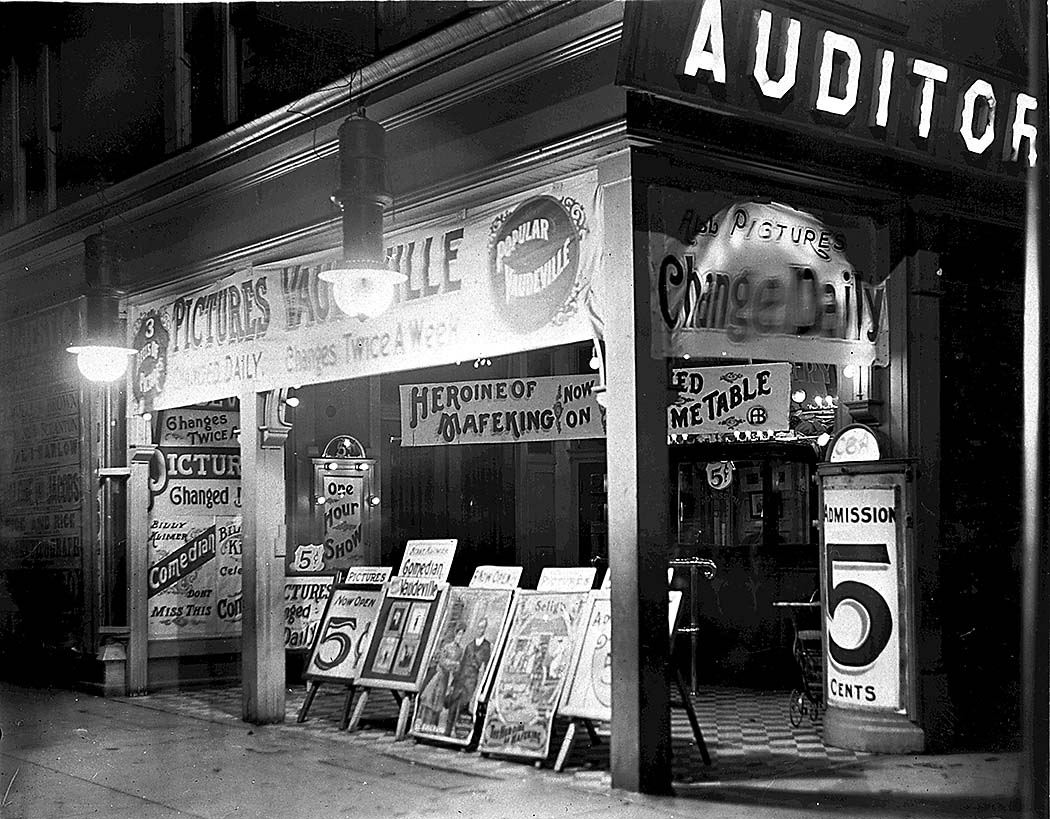
Auditorium Theatre in Toronto

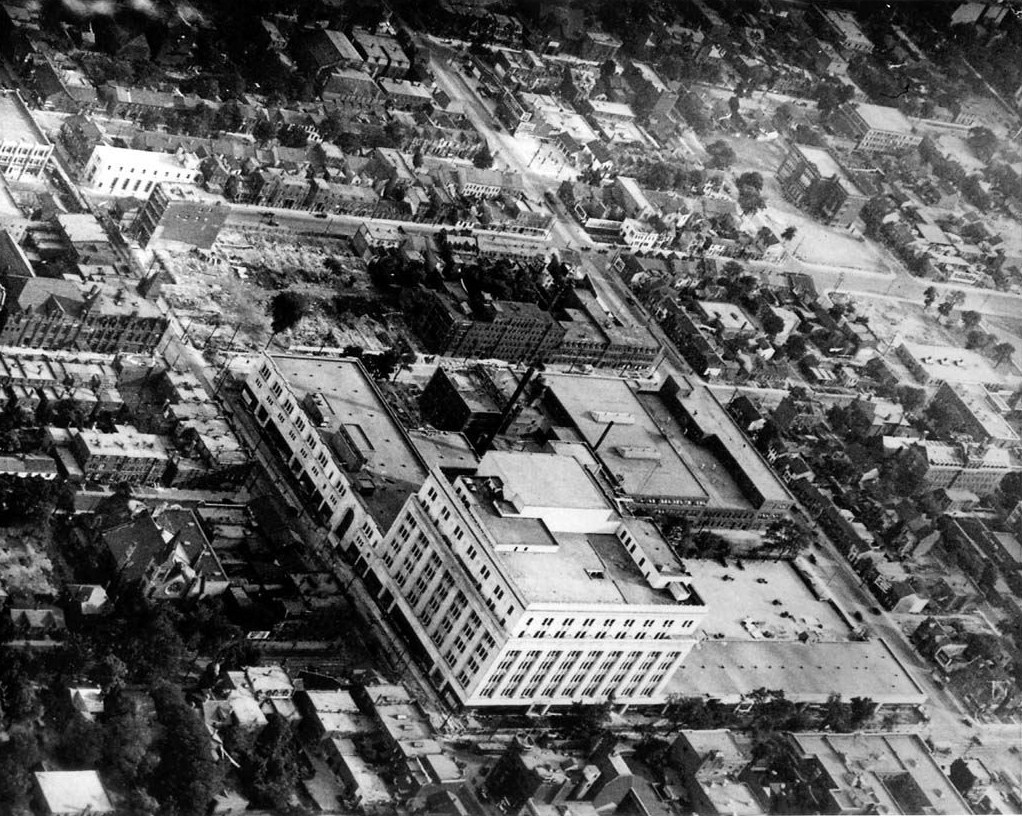
Aerial view of Eaton's College Street 1930 Toronto
