= Long Branch Racetrack =

Canadian horse-racing track

Coordinates: 43.610599°N 79.524208°W

Long Branch Racetrack was a horse-racing facility in Etobicoke, Ontario, Canada. It was situated in Etobicoke, then a township, just north of the village of Long Branch and just west of the city of Toronto. It operated from 1924 until 1955 at a location west of Kipling Avenue, north of Horner Avenue and south of Evans Avenue. The track is the originator of two stakes races that are still run today: the Canadian International Stakes and the Cup and Saucer Stakes. The track opened in September 1924. It was owned by Abe Orpen and his family which also owned the Dufferin Park Racetrack in Toronto. The track was 1 mile (1.6 km) in length.

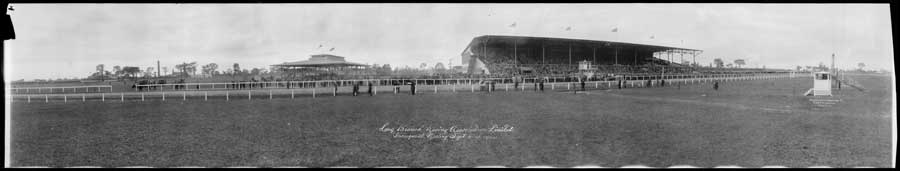
Panoramic view of Long Branch racetrack on opening day, 1924

== History ==
Abraham "Abe" Orpen and Thomas Hare, operators of the Dufferin Park Racetrack in Toronto, began construction on the new Long Branch track on June 26, 1924, under the supervision of Thomas Clarke. Construction of the half-mile turf track was completed in time for a seven-day meet beginning on September 6, 1924. Over 400 horses were in eight new stables with fifteen jockeys and 55 owners represented. The land for the track cost CA$150,000 and the track facilities, including a 10,000-seat grandstand, cost CA$250,000. The first day was a big success as 10,000 attended. An additional one-mile-long turf track was added in November 1924. The track operated two seven-day horse-racing meets annually, one in June and another in the fall. Located on a rail line, special trains were run to the track from downtown Toronto.

A dispute erupted between Orpen and the Government of Ontario. To operate the track, Orpen had applied to the Government of Canada to incorporate the Long Branch Racing Association which would operate the track. The letters patent were published in the Canada Gazette on September 6, the day the track held its first races in a meet of seven races a day for seven days. The Government of Ontario immediately attempted to shut down the track, while also collecting a percentage of the wagers placed at the track. The Attorney-General of Ontario, W. F. Nickle, claimed that the Canadian government had granted the licence without consulting him first. Nickle declared the letters patent received by Orpen to be invalid because they were for athletic purposes only, meaning that betting was illegal.

The case went to trial where the Crown argued that the letters of incorporation for the Long Branch Racing Association made no mention of horse-racing. The defence readily admitted that the track had accepted wagers and paid a percentage of wagers and an amusement tax to Ontario. Long Branch lost the case and was fined $249, but announced that they would continue with their next set of races in October 1924. Orpen then filed for another charter with the Canadian government for the October races. Orpen filed an appeal of the conviction but lost. Orpen also applied for a racing charter with the Ontario government and a return of the money that the Ontario government had collected, which he failed to get returned. Orpen next filed a suit in December 1924, claiming the Government of Ontario had wrongfully collected a tax on the wagering.

The dispute continued into 1925. The Ontario government threatened to deny Orpen a licence to operate if he did not pay CA$30,000 in arrears. In February, Orpen's lawsuit of December 1924 was dismissed. Further, in April 1925, the Ontario government announced an increase in the tax on betting, estimated to cost Orpen an extra CA$140,000, based on his 1924 revenues from Dufferin Park and Long Branch. Orpen stated that the extra cost would likely mean the suspension of operations at Dufferin and Long Branch. In June 1925, Orpen paid the disputed CA$30,000 after the Ontario government threatened to prevent racing later that month at the track, by using the Ontario Provincial Police to block racing. Wagers at the 1925 spring seven-day meet totalled CA$1.78 million, which net the Ontario government CA$132 thousand. The total for the 1925 season was CA$3.167 million in wagers and another CA$89,000 in gate receipts. After a down year at Ontario tracks overall in 1926, the Ontario government reduced the cost of the per-day racing permit from CA$7,500 to CA$5,000 per day for the 1927 season.

In 1927, Long Branch expanded its stables to 494 stalls, citing an expanded interest. In 1928, it added an "amplified" public address system similar to that used at race tracks in Maryland. In its fall meet, the track added a moveable stall starting gate, a first for a North American track. That season Long Branch's wagering rose above CA$3 million to CA$3.046 million, surpassing Orpen's other Toronto track Dufferin, which had wagering of CA$2.8 million, but less than Kenilworth's wagering of CA$3.07 million.

In 1936, Long Branch became the first Canadian race track to employ the camera "photo finish" system to settle close races.

In September 1937, Abe Orpen died and the track was continued by his partner Thomas Hare and his sons A. M. Orpen Jr. and Fred Orpen. Hare died in February 1938 and the Orpens bought out his estate in 1942.

After the 1941 fall races, the track was turned over to the Government of Canada for war purposes. In April 1942, Long Branch announced the cancellation of its two 1942 meets. Although it was suggested that the four race tracks of Toronto consolidate their races at Woodbine, the Orpens received permission to move their 1942 races to Dufferin Park. Dufferin Park also hosted the 1943 through 1945 meets.

The track held its last race meet in 1955, finishing on October 21, 1955. Along with Dufferin Park, Long Branch racetrack was sold for CA$4 million by Fred Orpen to the Ontario Jockey Club, which consolidated horse-racing in Toronto at the two Woodbine racetracks. The Ontario Jockey Club continued the Cup and Saucer Stakes, the Canadian International Stakes and the Wild Mink Stakes, which had only been run once, in 1955.

== Notable races ==
The first Cup and Saucer Stakes, for Canadian two-year-olds, was run on October 13, 1937, at Long Branch. It was originally known as Mrs. Orpen's Cup and Saucer Handicap, named after Abe Orpen's wife. The first winner over the one mile and 70 yards distance was Suffern, owned by Harry C. Hatch and ridden by Charlie McTague. It had 18 entrants. It had a purse of CA$5,000, the richest race for two-year-olds in Canada.

In 1938, Long Branch inaugurated the Canadian International Stakes, (first known as the Long Branch Championship) open to all thoroughbreds three years old and older. The first race was held on October 10, 1938, and was won by the three-year-old Bunty Lawless, ridden by Tommy Aimers and owned by Willie Morrissey. Bunty Lawless would win the race again three years later, in 1941.

Other prominent races held by the Long Branch Jockey Club included the Orpen Memorial for three- and four-year-olds foaled in Canada, and the Long Branch Handicap for three-year-olds and up.

== Other events ==
The track was used for other events. On July 12, 1925, the Orangeman Parade of Long Branch ended at the track where former Toronto Mayor and then Toronto North MP Thomas Church along with MPP for York East and Ontario Minister of Highways George Stewart Henry took the salute. On August 8, 1925, the West York Conservatives held a picnic at Long Branch. Over 15,000 attended, including members' families. Boy Scouts and Girl Guides held activities for member's children. The children's activities drowned out the political speakers (Forbes Godfrey and Henry Drayton) and they had to cut their comments short. The track was loaned to the Conservatives by Orpen.

On September 17, 1935, a Stinson Detroiter made an emergency landing at the racetrack after a violent confrontation between the pilot of the aircraft and baseball player Len Koenecke, who was found to have died of his wounds.

A Liberal Party rally was held on September 18, 1938, where Ontario Premier Mitchell Hepburn spoke.

== Legacy ==
The site is today part of an industrial area in Etobicoke, including a large Goodyear Tire facility. Along Horner Avenue at the railway line, there remains a column from the south entrance and a grove of trees leading north, marking the entranceway. The site is marked by a historical plaque next to the remaining brick/stone pillar of the former track entrance.

The two stakes races originated at Long Branch—the Canadian International Stakes and the Cup and Saucer Stakes—are continued today at Woodbine Racetrack in north Etobicoke.
