= 1879 Ontario general election =

Canadian provincial election

- June 5, 1879

88 seats in the 4th Legislative Assembly of Ontario 45 seats were needed for a majority
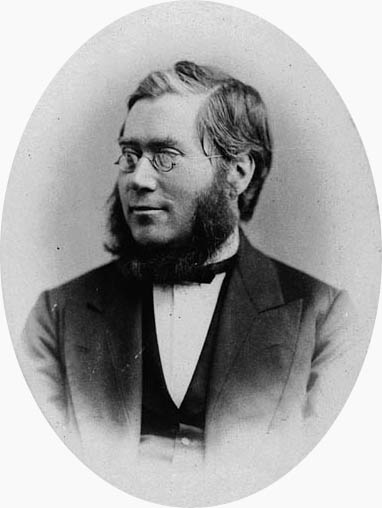

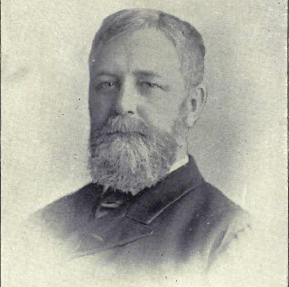
	First party	Second party
Leader	Oliver Mowat	William Ralph Meredith
Party	Liberal	Conservative
Leader since	1872	1879
Leader's seat	Oxford North	London
Last election	50	34
Seats won	57	29
Seat change	▲7	▼5
Premier before election
Oliver Mowat
Liberal
Premier after election
Oliver Mowat
Liberal

The 1879 Ontario general election was the fourth general election held in the province of Ontario, Canada. It was held on June 5, 1879, to elect the 88 members of the 4th Legislative Assembly ("MLAs").

The Ontario Liberal Party, led by Oliver Mowat, won a third term in government with a larger majority in the legislature.

The Ontario Conservative Party, led by William Ralph Meredith, continued to lose seats.

== Results ==
Elections to the 4th Parliament of Ontario (1879)
Political party	Party leader	MLAs				Votes			
Political party	Party leader	Candidates	1875	1879	±	#	±	%	± (pp)
Liberal	Oliver Mowat	81	50	57	7▲	119,148	28,339▲	48.07%	0.52▲
Conservative	William Ralph Meredith	87	34	29	5▼	118,513	31,693▲	47.82%	2.35▲
Liberal–Conservative	William Ralph Meredith	–	1	–	1▼	–	1,553▼	–	0.81▼
Independent Conservative		2	2	2	Steady	2,111	18▼	0.85%	0.26▼
Independent Liberal		–	1	–	1▼	–	1,125▼	–	0.59▼
Independent		19	–	–	–	8,085	1,328▲	3.26%	0.28▼
Total		189	88	88		247,857		100.00%	
Voter turnout						247,857	56,891▲	63.22	4.06▼
Registered electors						392,085	108,229▲		
Acclamations		█ Liberal		1					
Acclamations		█ Conservative		1					

Seats and popular vote by party
Party	Seats	Votes	Change (pp)
█ Liberal	57 / 88	48.07%	0.52
█ Conservative	29 / 88	47.82%	2.35
█ Other	2 / 88	4.11%	-2.87

=== Synopsis of results ===
Results by riding - 1879 Ontario general election
Riding	Winning party						Turnout	Votes				
Name (Note: order is as given in EO reports)	1875	Party	Votes	Share	Margin #	Margin %	Turnout	Lib	Con	I-Con	Ind	Total
Addington	Lib	Lib	1,531	50.75%	45	1.49%	66.76%	1,531	1,486	–	–	3,017
Algoma	Lib	Lib	1,081	53.86%	155	7.72%	96.58%	1,081	926	–	–	2,007
Brant North	Lib	Lib	990	60.37%	340	20.73%	66.80%	990	650	–	–	1,640
Brant South	Lib	Lib	1,622	56.87%	392	13.74%	60.93%	1,622	1,230	–	–	2,852
Brockville	Lib	Lib	1,379	52.14%	113	4.27%	60.33%	1,379	1,266	–	–	2,645
Bruce North	Lib	Lib	1,686	56.77%	402	13.54%	63.41%	1,686	1,284	–	–	2,970
Bruce South	Lib	Lib	2,866	50.62%	70	1.24%	72.67%	2,866	2,796	–	–	5,662
Cardwell	Con	Lib	1,261	50.60%	30	1.20%	70.94%	1,261	1,231	–	–	2,492
Carleton	Con	Con	2,074	79.74%	1,547	59.48%	55.47%	527	2,074	–	–	2,601
Cornwall	Con	Lib	acclaimed									
Dufferin	Con	Con	1,357	55.32%	261	10.64%	58.18%	–	1,357	–	1,096	2,453
Dundas	Con	Con	1,674	51.24%	81	2.48%	77.29%	1,593	1,674	–	–	3,267
Durham East	Con	Con	1,292	52.33%	200	8.10%	55.58%	–	1,292	–	1,177	2,469
Durham West	Lib	Lib	1,467	52.66%	148	5.31%	72.89%	1,467	1,319	–	–	2,786
Elgin East	Lib	Lib	2,275	51.49%	132	2.99%	66.71%	2,275	2,143	–	–	4,418
Elgin West	Con	Lib	1,257	50.22%	11	0.44%	70.27%	1,257	1,246	–	–	2,503
Essex North	Con	Con	1,062	56.04%	229	12.08%	42.68%	833	1,062	–	–	1,895
Essex South	Con	Con	1,418	52.93%	157	5.86%	74.29%	1,261	1,418	–	–	2,679
Frontenac	Con	Con	710	45.57%	204	13.09%	55.86%	506	710	–	342	1,558
Glengarry	I-Lib	Con	1,331	50.78%	41	1.56%	74.31%	1,290	1,331	–	–	2,621
Grenville South	Lib	Con	1,205	53.01%	137	6.03%	70.20%	1,068	1,205	–	–	2,273
Grey East	Con	Con	1,294	55.70%	566	24.37%	49.64%	–	1,595 (Note: the incumbent Abram William Lauder was reelected)	–	728	2,323
Grey North	Con	Con	1,660	50.27%	18	0.55%	60.98%	1,642	1,660	–	–	3,302
Grey South	Lib	Lib	1,694	61.49%	633	22.98%	73.72%	1,694	1,061	–	–	2,755
Haldimand	Lib	Lib	1,612	51.01%	64	2.03%	76.44%	1,612	1,548	–	–	3,160
Halton	Lib	Lib	1,765	50.46%	32	0.91%	66.63%	1,765	1,733	–	–	3,498
Hamilton	Lib	Lib	2,240	50.70%	62	1.40%	59.07%	2,240	2,178	–	–	4,418
Hastings East	I-Con	I-Con	1,204	51.52%	71	3.04%	67.82%	–	1,133	1,204	–	2,337
Hastings North	Con	Con	1,081	51.35%	57	2.71%	63.27%	–	1,081	–	1,024	2,105
Hastings West	Con	Con	1,402	56.60%	327	13.20%	68.92%	1,075	1,402	–	–	2,477
Huron East	Lib	Lib	1,924	50.74%	56	1.48%	68.76%	1,924	1,868	–	–	3,792
Huron South	Lib	Lib	1,893	52.21%	160	4.41%	70.75%	1,893	1,733	–	–	3,626
Huron West	Lib	Lib	2,064	55.57%	414	11.15%	62.70%	2,064	1,650	–	–	3,714
Kent East	Lib	Lib	1,774	54.91%	317	9.81%	58.60%	1,774	1,457	–	–	3,231
Kent West	Con	Lib	1,343	52.69%	137	5.37%	46.87%	1,343	1,206	–	–	2,549
Kingston	Con	Con	955	55.82%	199	11.63%	59.53%	756	955	–	–	1,711
Lambton East	Lib	Lib	1,840	50.88%	64	1.77%	73.23%	1,840	1,776	–	–	3,616
Lambton West	Lib	Lib	1,759	53.47%	228	6.93%	63.24%	1,759	1,531	–	–	3,290
Lanark North	Con	Lib	1,309	56.04%	282	12.07%	73.44%	1,309	1,027	–	–	2,336
Lanark South	Con	I-Con	907	49.64%	53	2.90%	56.60%	–	854	907	66	1,827
Leeds North and Grenville North	Con	Con	1,084	59.53%	347	19.06%	64.90%	737	1,084	–	–	1,821
Leeds South	Con	Con	1,362	56.92%	331	13.83%	57.41%	–	1,362	–	1,031	2,393
Lennox	I-Con	Lib	1,231	50.20%	10	0.41%	62.71%	1,231	1,221	–	–	2,452
Lincoln	Lib	Lib	2,222	50.79%	69	1.58%	68.25%	2,222	2,153	–	–	4,375
London	Con	Con	1,578	58.25%	447	16.50%	55.24%	1,131	1,578	–	–	2,709
Middlesex East	Con	Con	2,546	51.86%	183	3.73%	66.82%	2,363	2,546	–	–	4,909
Middlesex North	Con	Lib	1,917	53.22%	232	6.44%	72.87%	1,917	1,685	–	–	3,602
Middlesex West	Lib	Lib	1,575	50.82%	51	1.65%	69.80%	1,575	1,524	–	–	3,099
Monck	Lib	Lib	1,486	52.64%	149	5.28%	81.42%	1,486	1,337	–	–	2,823
Muskoka and Parry Sound	Lib	Lib	1,704	57.98%	469	15.96%	74.90%	1,704	1,235	–	–	2,939
Norfolk North	Lib	Lib	1,490	52.12%	121	4.23%	71.55%	1,490	1,369	–	–	2,859
Norfolk South	Con	Con	1,386	50.36%	20	0.73%	76.23%	1,366	1,386	–	–	2,752
Northumberland East	Lib	Lib	1,887	50.64%	48	1.29%	71.32%	1,887	1,839	–	–	3,726
Northumberland West	Lib	Lib	1,333	50.40%	21	0.79%	65.54%	1,333	1,312	–	–	2,645
Ontario North	Lib	Lib	2,244	52.21%	190	4.42%	63.85%	2,244	2,054	–	–	4,298
Ontario South	Con	Lib	1,721	56.24%	382	12.48%	60.59%	1,721	1,339	–	–	3,060
Ottawa	Lib	Con	1,064	39.72%	64	2.39%	47.99%	606	1,064	–	1,009	2,679
Oxford North	Lib	Lib	1,731	75.10%	1,157	50.20%	41.71%	1,731	574	–	–	2,305
Oxford South	Lib	Lib	1,775	66.73%	940	35.34%	48.33%	1,775	–	–	885	2,660
Peel	Lib	Lib	1,519	52.69%	155	5.38%	76.09%	1,519	1,364	–	–	2,883
Perth North	Lib	Lib	2,396	50.18%	17	0.36%	67.44%	2,396	2,379	–	–	4,775
Perth South	Lib	Lib	1,759	55.00%	320	10.01%	65.67%	1,759	1,439	–	–	3,198
Peterborough East	Con	Lib	1,078	53.21%	130	6.42%	65.38%	1,078	948	–	–	2,026
Peterborough West	Lib	Con	1,130	52.68%	252	11.75%	55.99%	878	1,130	–	137	2,145
Prescott	Con	Con	900	47.62%	278	14.71%	58.77%	622	900	–	368	1,890
Prince Edward	Lib	Lib	1,894	50.47%	35	0.93%	73.78%	1,894	1,859	–	–	3,753
Renfrew North	Con	Lib	1,066	52.56%	104	5.13%	72.07%	1,066	962	–	–	2,028
Renfrew South	Lib	Lib	837	54.28%	132	8.56%	67.72%	837	705	–	–	1,542
Russell	Con	Lib	696	37.30%	27	1.45%	38.86%	975	669	–	222	1,866
Simcoe East	Con	Lib	1,324	56.82%	318	13.65%	61.72%	1,324	1,006	–	–	2,330
Simcoe South	Con	Con	acclaimed									
Simcoe West	Con	Con	1,483	51.10%	64	2.21%	55.06%	1,419	1,483	–	–	2,902
Stormont	Lib	Con	950	50.29%	11	0.58%	71.47%	939	950	–	–	1,889
Toronto East	Con	Con	2,132	50.68%	57	1.35%	51.12%	2,075	2,132	–	–	4,207
Toronto West	Con	Con	2,324	50.74%	68	1.48%	45.24%	2,256	2,324	–	–	4,580
Victoria North	Lib	Lib	1,217	56.34%	274	12.69%	65.04%	1,217	943	–	–	2,160
Victoria South	Lib	Lib	1,644	51.81%	115	3.62%	68.27%	1,644	1,529	–	–	3,173
Waterloo North	Lib	Lib	1,351	53.29%	167	6.59%	71.37%	1,351	1,184	–	–	2,535
Waterloo South	Lib	Lib	1,699	57.38%	437	14.76%	72.06%	1,699	1,262	–	–	2,961
Welland	Lib	Con	1,966	50.97%	75	1.94%	66.49%	1,891	1,966	–	–	3,857
Wellington Centre	Lib	Lib	1,405	65.35%	660	30.70%	50.05%	1,405	745	–	–	2,150
Wellington South	Lib	Lib	1,430	52.15%	118	4.30%	65.83%	1,430	1,312	–	–	2,742
Wellington West	L-Con	Lib	2,026	56.00%	434	12.00%	64.61%	2,026	1,592	–	–	3,618
Wentworth North	Con	Lib	1,223	85.41%	1,014	70.81%	38.23%	1,223	209	–	–	1,432
Wentworth South	Lib	Con	1,231	50.02%	1	0.04%	66.19%	1,230	1,231	–	–	2,461
York East	Lib	Lib	1,825	53.58%	244	7.16%	58.93%	1,825	1,581	–	–	3,406
York North	Lib	Lib	2,200	56.54%	509	13.08%	68.77%	2,200	1,691	–	–	3,891
York West	Lib	Lib	1,268	51.21%	60	2.42%	63.16%	1,268	1,208	–	–	2,476

= open seat
= turnout is above provincial average
= winning candidate was in previous Legislature
= incumbent had switched allegiance
= previously incumbent in another riding
= not incumbent; was previously elected to the Legislature
= incumbency arose from byelection gain
= other incumbents renominated
= previously an MP in the House of Commons of Canada
= multiple candidates

=== Analysis ===
Party candidates in 2nd place
Party in 1st place	Party in 2nd place				Total
Party in 1st place	Accl	Lib	Con	Ind	Total
Liberal	1		55	1	57
Conservative	1	22		6	29
Independent Conservative					2
Total		22	57	7	88

Candidates ranked 1st to 5th place, by party
Parties	Accl	1st	2nd	3rd	4th	5th
█ Liberal	1	56	22	2		
█ Conservative	1	28	57	1		
█ Independent Conservative		2				
█ Independent			7	6	5	1

Resulting composition of the 2nd Legislative Assembly of Ontario
Source		Party			
Source		Lib	Con	I-Con	Total
Seats retained	Incumbents returned	30	17	1	48
Seats retained	Returned by acclamation		1		1
Seats retained	Open seats held	13	3		16
Seats retained	Ouster of incumbent changing allegiance		1		1
Seats changing hands	Incumbents defeated	8	3		11
Seats changing hands	Open seats gained	4	3	1	8
Seats changing hands	Byelection gains held	2	1		3
Total		57	29	2	88

=== MLAs elected by region and riding ===
Party designations are as follows:

Liberal
Conservative
Independent Conservative

Northern Ontario

- Algoma: Robert Adam Lyon

Ottawa Valley

- Carleton: George William Monk
- Lanark North: William Clyde Caldwell
- Lanark South: William Lees (I-Con)
- Ottawa: Patrick Baskerville
- Prescott: William Harkin
- Renfrew North: Thomas Deacon
- Renfrew South: Thomas Murray
- Russell: Ira Morgan (Note: Overturned on petition to the court, because of ballot papers improperly rejected. Adam Jacob Baker (Conservative) was declared elected.)

Saint Lawrence Valley

- Brockville: Christopher Finlay Fraser
- Cornwall: William Mack
- Dundas: Andrew Broder
- Glengarry: Donald Macmaster
- Grenville South: Frederick John French
- Kingston: James Henry Metcalfe
- Leeds North and Grenville North: Henry Merrick
- Leeds South: William Richardson
- Stormont: Joseph Kerr (Note: Election declared void because of corrupt practices. Writ for new election issued. Kerr was returned in the subsequent byelection.)

Central Ontario

- Addington: Hammel Madden Deroche
- Durham East: John Rosevear
- Durham West: James Wellington McLaughlin
- Frontenac: Delino Dexter Calvin
- Hastings East: Nathaniel Stephen Appleby (I-Con)
- Hastings North: George Henry Boulter
- Hastings West: Alexander Robertson (Note: Election declared void because of corrupt practices. Writ for new election issued. Robertson was returned in the subsequent byelection.)
- Lennox: George Douglas Hawley
- Northumberland East: James Marshall Ferris
- Northumberland West: John Collard Field
- Peterborough East: Thomas Blezard
- Peterborough West: William Hepburn Scott
- Prince Edward: Gideon Striker
- Victoria North: Samuel Stanley Peck
- Victoria South: Samuel Casey Wood

Georgian Bay

- Bruce North: Donald Sinclair
- Grey North: David Creighton
- Muskoka and Parry Sound: John Classon Miller
- Simcoe East: Herman Henry Cook
- Simcoe South: William James Parkhill
- Simcoe West: Thomas Long

Wentworth/Halton/Niagara

- Halton: David Robertson
- Hamilton: John Morison Gibson
- Lincoln: Sylvester Neelon
- Monck: Richard Harcourt
- Welland: Daniel Near
- Wentworth North: James McMahon
- Wentworth South: Franklin Carpenter (Note: Overturned on petition to the court. Nicholas Awrey (Liberal) was declared elected.)

Midwestern Ontario

- Brant North: James Young
- Brant South: Arthur Sturgis Hardy
- Bruce South: Rupert Mearse Wells
- Dufferin: John Barr (Note: Election declared void because of corrupt practices. Writ for new election issued, but Barr would decline to stand for reelection. William Jelly would succeed in the ensuing race.)
- Grey East: Abram William Lauder
- Grey South: James Hill Hunter
- Haldimand: Jacob Baxter
- Huron East: Thomas Gibson
- Huron South: Archibald Bishop
- Huron West: Alexander McLagan Ross
- Norfolk North: John Bailey Freeman
- Norfolk South: William Morgan
- Oxford North: Oliver Mowat
- Oxford South: Adam Crooks
- Perth North: David Davidson Hay
- Perth South: Thomas Ballantyne
- Waterloo North: Moses Springer
- Waterloo South: James Livingston
- Wellington Centre: Charles Clarke
- Wellington South: James Laidlaw
- Wellington West: Robert McKim

Southwestern Ontario

- Elgin East: Thomas McIntyre Nairn
- Elgin West: John Cascaden
- Essex North: Solomon White
- Essex South: Lewis Wigle
- Kent East: Daniel McCraney
- Kent West: Edward Robinson
- Lambton East: Peter Graham
- Lambton West: Timothy Blair Pardee
- London: William Ralph Meredith
- Middlesex East: Richard Tooley
- Middlesex North: John Waters
- Middlesex West: John Watterworth

Peel/York/Ontario

- Cardwell: Charles Robinson
- Ontario North: Thomas Paxton
- Ontario South: John Dryden
- Peel: Kenneth Chisholm
- Toronto East: Alexander Morris
- Toronto West: Robert Bell
- York East: George Badgerow
- York North: Joseph Henry Widdifield
- York West: Peter Patterson

== See also ==
- Politics of Ontario
- List of Ontario political parties
- Premier of Ontario
- Leader of the Opposition (Ontario)
