= Thomas Dixon Craig =

Canadian politician and merchant

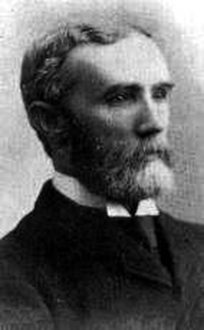
- Craig, c.1898

Member of the Ontario Parliament for Durham East
- In office 1886–1890
- Preceded by: Charles Herbert Brereton
- Succeeded by: George Campbell

Member of the Canadian Parliament for Durham East
- In office 1891–1900
- Preceded by: Henry Alfred Ward
- Succeeded by: Henry Alfred Ward

Personal details
- Born: November 20, 1842 London, England
- Died: April 4, 1905 (aged 62)
- Party: Independent Conservative

Thomas Dixon Craig (November 20, 1842 – April 4, 1905) was a merchant and political figure in Ontario, Canada. He represented Durham East in the Legislative Assembly of Ontario from 1886 to 1890 and in the House of Commons of Canada from 1891 to 1900 as an Independent Conservative member.

He was born in London, England in 1842 and came to Canada West with his family the following year. Craig was educated at the University of Toronto. He was a tanner in Port Hope.
