= Faltis =

Faltis is a surname of central European origin. Notable people with the surname include:

- Evelyn Faltis (1887–1937), Bohemian composer
- Otto Faltis (1888–1974), Austrian businessman

== See also ==
- Fallis (surname)
