= Durham East =

Durham East could refer to:

- Durham East (federal electoral district)
- Durham East (provincial electoral district)
