= Fallis (surname) =

Fallis is a surname. Notable people with the surname include:

- Abigail Fallis (born 1968), British sculptor
- Albert James Fallis, Canadian politician
- Catherine Fallis Backus (1863–1955), American sculptor
- E.O. Fallis, American architect
- Edwina Hume Fallis (1876–1957), American educator
- Ian Fallis (1954–1977), Scottish football player
- Iva Campbell Fallis (1883–1956), Canadian politician
- Jacque Batt (died 2014), born Jacque Fallis
- James Robinson Fallis (1871–1935), Canadian politician
- Mary Lou Fallis (born 1948), Canadian opera singer
- Terry Fallis (born 1959), Canadian author
- William Armstrong Fallis (1832–1903), Canadian politician
