= Durham (Province of Canada electoral district) =

Province of Canada electoral division

Durham Canada West
Province of Canada electoral district

Defunct pre-Confederation electoral district
- Legislature: Legislative Assembly of the Province of Canada
- District created: 1841
- District abolished: 1867
- First contested: 1841
- Last contested: 1863

Durham was an electoral district of the Legislative Assembly of the Parliament of the Province of Canada, in Canada West, on the north shore of Lake Ontario. It was created in 1841, upon the establishment of the Province of Canada by the union of Upper Canada and Lower Canada. Durham was represented by one member in the Legislative Assembly. It was abolished in 1867, upon the creation of Canada and the province of Ontario.

== Boundaries ==
Durham electoral district was based on Durham County, on the north shore of Lake Ontario, in Canada West (now the province of Ontario), east of what is now Toronto. Oshawa and Port Hope were two of the main towns.

The Union Act, 1840 had merged the two provinces of Upper Canada and Lower Canada into the Province of Canada, with a single Parliament. The separate parliaments of Lower Canada and Upper Canada were abolished. The Union Act provided that the pre-existing electoral boundaries of Upper Canada would continue to be used in the new Parliament, unless altered by the Union Act itself.

Durham County had been an electoral district in the Legislative Assembly of Upper Canada, and its boundaries were not altered by the Act. Those boundaries had been initially been set by the first Lieutenant Governor of Upper Canada, John Graves Simcoe, in 1792:

That the thirteenth of the said counties be hereafter called by the name of the county of Durham; which county is to be bounded on the east by the westernmost line of the county of Northumberland, on the south by lake Ontario until it meets the westernmost point of Long Beach, thence by a line running north sixteen degrees west until it intersects the southern boundary of a tract of land belonging to the Mississague Indians, thence along the said tract parallel to lake Ontario until it meets the northwesternmost boundary of the county of Northumberland.

The boundaries were further defined by a statute of Upper Canada in 1798, and modified by an additional statute in 1834:

That the townships of Hope, Clarke and Darlington, with all the tract of land hereafter to be laid out into townships, which lies to the southward of the small lakes above the Rice Lake, and the communication between them and between the eastern boundary of the township of Hope, and the western boundary of the township of Darlington, produced north, sixteen degrees west, until they intersect either of the said lakes, or the communication between them, shall constitute and form the County of Durham.

In 1834, the townships of Verulam, Fenelon and Eldon were added to Durham County.

Since Durham was not changed by the Union Act, those boundaries continued to be used for the new electoral district.

== Members of the Legislative Assembly ==
Durham was represented by one member in the Legislative Assembly. The following were the members for Durham.

Parliament	Years	Member	Party
1st Parliament; 1841–1844	1841–1844	John Tucker Williams	Unionist; Reformer, then Independent

== Abolition ==
The district was abolished on July 1, 1867, when the British North America Act, 1867 came into force, creating Canada and splitting the Province of Canada into Quebec and Ontario. It was split into two electoral districts at both the federal level and the provincial level: Durham East and Durham West in the House of Commons of Canada, Durham East and Durham West in the Legislative Assembly of Ontario.
