= John Hilliard Carnegie =

Canadian politician

Ontario MPP
- In office 1894–1909
- Preceded by: John Fell
- Succeeded by: Robert Mercer Mason
- Constituency: Victoria East

Personal details
- Born: May 24, 1865 Peterborough, Canada West
- Died: April 10, 1937 (aged 71) Toronto, Ontario
- Party: Conservative
- Occupation: Farmer

John Hilliard Carnegie (May 24, 1865 – April 10, 1937) was a Canadian farmer and political figure. He represented Victoria East in the Legislative Assembly of Ontario as a Conservative member from 1894 to 1909.

He was born in Peterborough in 1865, the son of John Carnegie, and educated there, at the Guelph Agricultural College and in Edinburgh. He served as auditor for Bexley Township and was also a member of the township council. Carnegie retired from politics in 1909. He died in 1937.
