= Lewis Ross (Canadian politician) =

Canadian politician and merchant

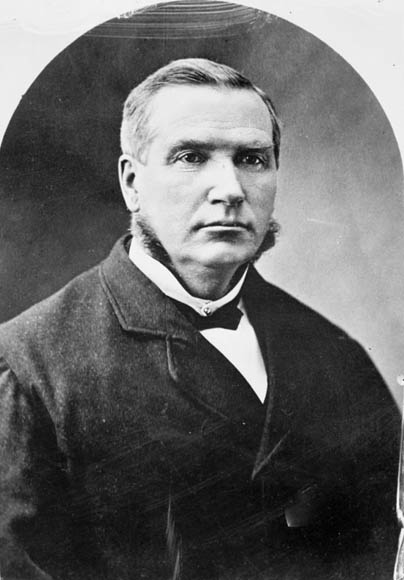

Member of the Canadian Parliament for Durham East
- In office 1872–1878
- Preceded by: Francis H. Burton
- Succeeded by: Arthur T.H. Williams

Personal details
- Born: 1825 Fearn Parish, Ross-shire, Scotland
- Died: September 20, 1882 (aged 56–57)
- Party: Liberal (Reformer)

Lewis Ross (1825 – September 20, 1882) was a Canadian merchant and political figure. He represented Durham East in the House of Commons of Canada from 1872 to 1878 as a Liberal Reformer member.

He was born in Fearn Parish, Ross-shire, Scotland and was educated there. After coming to Canada, he became a merchant in Port Hope. Ross was a director of the Midland Railway, the Midland Manufacturing Company and the Royal Canadian Insurance Company. He was also chairman of the local public school board and president of the Port Hope Agricultural Society. In 1852, he married a Miss Clute. Ross ran unsuccessfully for reelection in 1878 and 1882, losing to Arthur Trefusis Heneage Williams each time. Ross died in Port Hope at the age of 57.

He was the brother of Walter Ross who served in the House of Commons around the same time.
