= Robert Christie (Ontario politician) =

Canadian politician

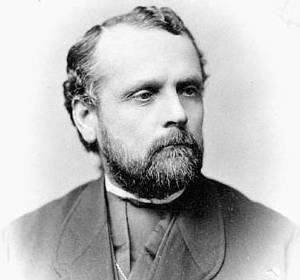

Ontario MPP
- In office 1867–1874
- Preceded by: Riding established
- Succeeded by: Thomas Stock
- Constituency: Wentworth North

Personal details
- Born: June 29, 1826 Orkney Islands, Scotland
- Died: March 9, 1914 (aged 87) Toronto, Ontario
- Party: Liberal
- Occupation: Businessman

Robert Christie (June 29, 1826 – March 9, 1914) was an Ontario businessman and political figure. He represented Wentworth North in the Legislative Assembly of Ontario as a Liberal member from 1867 to 1874.

He served as vice-president of the Canadian Mutual Fire Insurance Company and was a director of the Canada West Farmer's Mutual and Stock Insurance Company. He later was named Inspector of Asylums and Prisons. He died in 1914. He was the last surviving member of the first Ontario legislature at the time of his death.

== Electoral history ==
1867 Ontario general election: Wentworth North
Party	Candidate	Votes	%
Liberal	Robert Christie	1,139	50.44
Conservative	Mr. Miller	1,119	49.56
Total valid votes		2,258	79.93
Eligible voters		2,825	
Liberal pickup new district.			
Source: Elections Ontario

1871 Ontario general election: Wentworth North
Party	Candidate	Votes	%	±%
Liberal	Robert Christie	1,071	57.24	+6.80
Conservative	Mr. Wood	800	42.76	−6.80
Turnout		1,871	70.95	−8.98
Eligible voters		2,637		
Liberal hold		Swing		+6.80
Source: Elections Ontario

1875 Ontario general election: Wentworth North
Party	Candidate	Votes	%	±%
Conservative	Thomas Stock	1,222	50.48	+7.72
Liberal	Robert Christie	1,199	49.52	−7.72
Total valid votes		2,421	73.72	+2.77
Eligible voters		3,284		
Election voided
Source: Elections Ontario
