= Charles Brereton =

Charles Brereton may refer to:

- Charles Brereton (cricketer) (1838–1898), English cricketer
- Charles Herbert Brereton (1845–1908), Ontario doctor and political figure
- Charles Trelawny Brereton (c. 1757–1820), British Army officer and landowner
