= Robert McGhee (politician) =

Canadian politician

Ontario MPP
- In office 1883–1886
- Preceded by: William Jelly
- Succeeded by: Falkner Cornwall Stewart
- Constituency: Dufferin

Personal details
- Born: 1836
- Died: June 4, 1893 (aged 56–57) Dufferin County, Ontario
- Party: Conservative
- Relations: Edward August, son-in-law
- Occupation: Farmer

Robert McGhee (c. 1836 – June 4, 1893) was an Ontario farmer and politician. He represented Dufferin in the Legislative Assembly of Ontario as a Conservative member from 1883 to 1886.

McGhee came to Melancthon Township in Dufferin County in 1848. He served as reeve of Melancthon from 1865 to 1879 and again from 1891 until his death in the early summer of 1893.

His daughter Isabella married Manitoba politician Edward August.

== Electoral history ==
1879 Ontario general election: Dufferin
Party	Candidate	Votes	%	±%
Conservative	John Barr	1,357	55.32	+2.93
Independent	Robert McGhee	1,096	44.68	
Total valid votes		2,453	58.18	−8.05
Eligible voters		4,216		
Conservative gain from Liberal–Conservative		Swing		+2.93
Source: Elections Ontario
