= Arthur Trefusis Heneage Williams =

Canadian politician and militia officer (1837–1885)

Lieutenant-Colonel Arthur Trefusis Heneage Williams MP
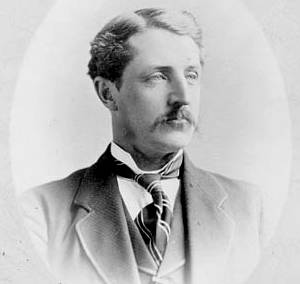
- Born: June 13, 1837; Port Hope, Upper Canada
- Died: July 4, 1885 (aged 48) near Fort Pitt, Saskatchewan District, NWT
- Relatives: John Tucker Williams; Arthur Victor Seymour Williams; Williams family of Caerhays and Burncoose
- Military career
- Allegiance: Canada
- Branch: Canadian Militia
- Rank: Lieutenant-colonel
- Commands: 46th East Durham Battalion of Infantry; Midland Provisional Battalion
- Conflicts: Fenian Raids; North-West Rebellion
- Awards: North-West Rebellion Medal with Saskatchewan bar
- Other work: Businessman, farmer and political figure

Lieutenant-Colonel Arthur Trefusis Heneage Williams MP (June 13, 1837 – July 4, 1885) was a Canadian businessman, farmer and political figure. His statue stands in front of the town hall of Port Hope, Ontario.

== Biography ==
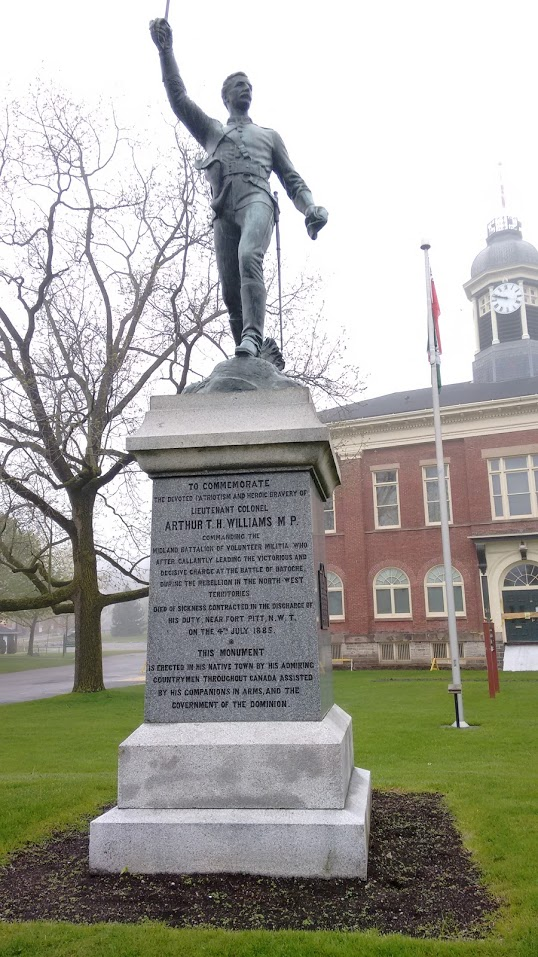
Statue of Williams in Port Hope, Ontario

Born at Penryn Park, Port Hope in Upper Canada in 1837, a member of the Williams family of Caerhays and Burncoose. He was the eldest son of John Tucker Williams and his wife Sarah, daughter of Judge Thomas Ward (1770–1861) of Port Hope. He studied at Upper Canada College and the University of Edinburgh before travelling throughout Europe. He studied law but was not called to the bar, instead he 'delighted in calling himself a farmer', managing Penryn Park, the estate he'd inherited from his father. He was president and founder of the Midlands Loan and Savings Company and a director for the Midland Railway of Canada, which had a terminus in his hometown.

In politics, he represented Durham East in the Legislative Assembly of Ontario from 1867 to 1874 and in the House of Commons of Canada as a Conservative member from 1879 to 1885.

Williams was captain in the local militia, later becoming lieutenant-colonel. In 1885, he led The Midland Battalion which helped put down the North-West Rebellion. Shortly after the Battle of Batoche, he became ill and died of fever on a steamboat on the North Saskatchewan River in 1885. The Dictionary of Canadian Biography writes,

Colonel Williams was the only nationally known figure to die in the northwest campaign and his body was brought home in state. A huge funeral was held in Port Hope where citizens erected a statue in his honour. Parliament voted his orphaned children a special pension. Then, like most heroes, he was gradually forgotten. To Charles Arkoll Boulton, a contemporary, Williams "represented what might be termed Young Canada"; to posterity, he reflects a model of the patriotic landed gentleman, using his wealth and position for dignified public service, accepting payment in the currency of honour and prestige. In short, Arthur Williams was an anachronism.

Williams married Emily, the daughter of Senator Benjamin Seymour of Port Hope. They were the parents of General Arthur Victor Seymour Williams.

A collection of his North-West Rebellion Medal with Saskatchewan bar and his son's Second Boer War, and World War I medals were auctioned by Plato Auctions in April 2010.

== Electoral history ==
1867 Ontario general election: Durham East
Party	Candidate	Votes	%
Conservative	Arthur Trefusis Heneage Williams	1,208	95.19
Liberal	S.S. Smith	61	4.81
Total valid votes		1,269	43.88
Eligible voters		2,892	
Conservative pickup new district.			
Source: Elections Ontario

1871 Ontario general election: Durham East
Party	Candidate	Votes
Conservative	Arthur Trefusis Heneage Williams	Acclaimed
Source: Elections Ontario

Parliament of Canada
Preceded by Lewis Ross	Member of Parliament for Durham East; 1878–1885	Succeeded by Henry Alfred Ward
Political offices
Preceded by None	Member of the Ontario Legislative Assembly for Durham East; 1867–1874	Succeeded by John Rosevear
Preceded by Rufus Stephenson	Chief Government Whip; 1882–1885	Succeeded by Paul Étienne Grandbois
