= John Tucker Williams =

British naval officer and Province of Canada politician

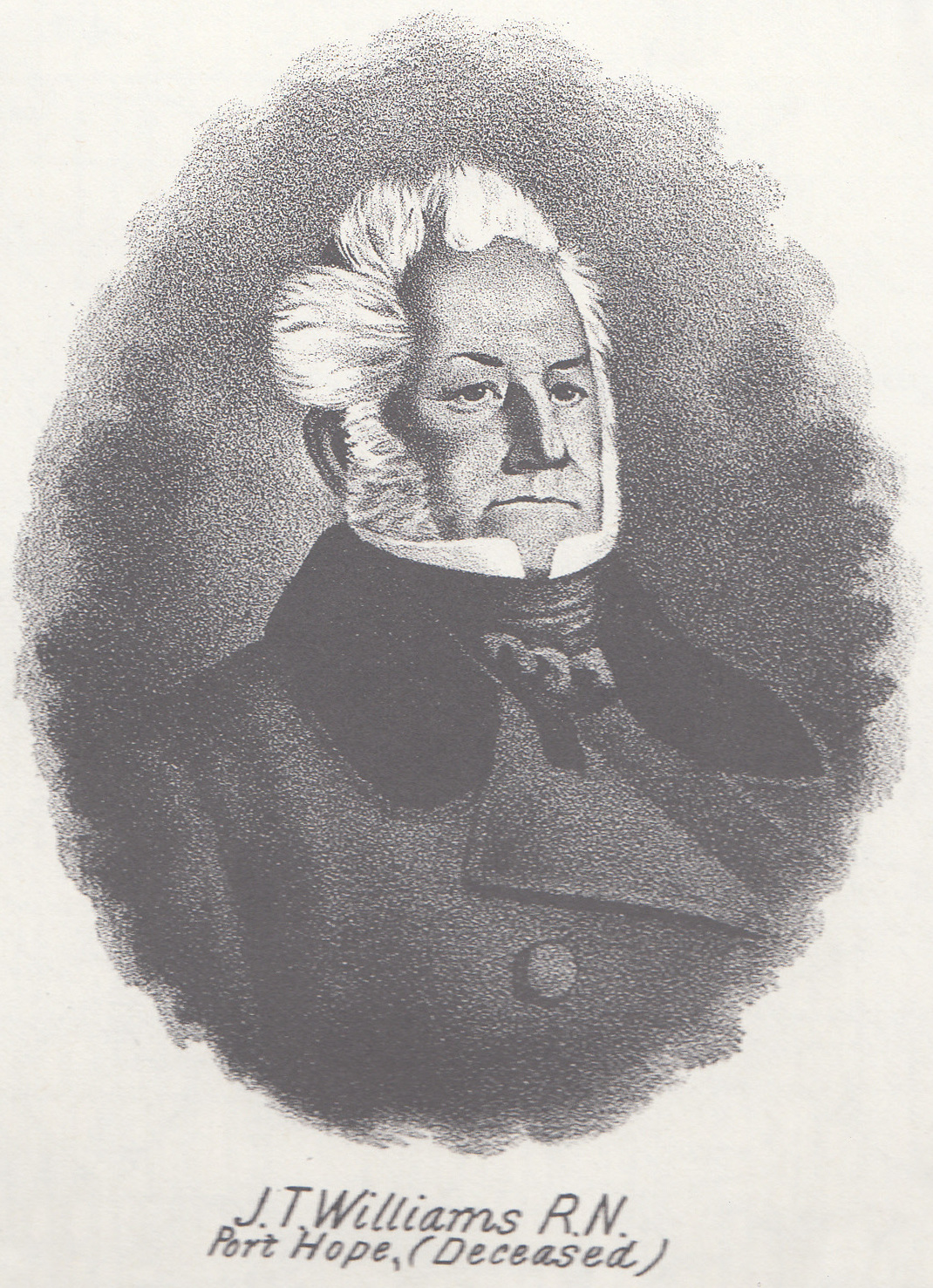

Member of the Legislative Assembly, Province of Canada, for Durham
- In office 1841–1847
- Preceded by: New position

Mayor of Port Hope
- In office 1850 – 1851; 1853–1854

Personal details
- Born: 1789 Penryn, Cornwall
- Died: September 9, 1854 (aged 64–65)
- Party: Reformer (1st Parliament); Tory (2nd Parliament)
- Relatives: Arthur Trefusis Heneage Williams (son); Arthur Victor Seymour Williams (grandson)
- Occupation: Land-owner
- Profession: Naval officer

Military service
- Allegiance: British Empire
- Branch/service: Royal Navy; Upper Canada milita
- Commands: HM Sloop Sunrise (Lake Ontario)
- Battles/wars: Battle of Trafalgar; War of 1812 – Lake Ontario naval engagements

John Tucker Williams (1789 – September 9, 1854) was a British naval officer and political figure in Canada West.

== Early life and military career ==
Williams was born at Penryn, Cornwall in 1789, a member of the Williams family of Caerhays and Burncoose. His middle name was for the Tucker family of Trematon Castle in Cornwall. He joined the Royal Navy and served at the Battle of Trafalgar.

He came to Upper Canada in 1813, under the command of Sir James Lucas Yeo, the commander of the British ships on the Great Lakes. During the War of 1812, he served under Yeo. Following the war, in 1816 he was appointed commander of HM Sloop Sunrise on Lake Ontario. In 1817, when the naval fleets were dispersed, he returned to England, but came back to Upper Canada in 1818, bearing dispatches for a land grant.

Williams first settled in Cobourg and later moved to Port Hope (at that time in Durham County), where he built his homestead, Penryn Place. While it was being built, he stayed at a local hotel, the Mansion House, and had £5,000 stolen from him. In spite of Williams and others offering a reward of $500, it was never recovered.

During the Rebellions of 1837, Williams raised a company of militia from Durham county in support of the government.

== Political career ==
Williams represented Durham in the Legislative Assembly of the Province of Canada for two terms, elected in the general elections of 1841 and 1844. He was a supporter of the union of Upper Canada and Lower Canada into the new Province of Canada.

Originally a moderate Reformer, he consistently supported the Governor General, Lord Sydenham, in the first session of the first provincial Parliament. In subsequent sessions of the first Parliament, he gradually shifted from Reform to independent. By the time of the second Parliament, he generally voted with the Tories. He did not stand for re-election in the 1848 general election.

Williams was part of a delegation sent to Britain during the debate on the Corn Laws, to represent Canadian agricultural interests.

While in Parliament, he introduced a bill for the first copyright act in Canada. After the bill passed, two of the first grants of copyright were for a teacher in Port Hope who had written a music book and a speller.

In 1850, Williams was elected the first mayor of Port Hope, a new office replacing the position of chief magistrate. He served a one-year term and then was re-elected in 1853.

== Family and death ==
In 1830, Williams married Sarah Ward, daughter of Thomas Ward (1770–1861) of Port Hope. Ward was an English naval captain who came to Upper Canada with Governor John Graves Simcoe in 1791. He later served as judge of the county court. Sarah's nephew was Henry Alfred Ward, who served in the Canadian House of Commons.

John and Sarah had seven children. One of their sons was Arthur Trefusis Heneage Williams, who later represented Durham East in the provincial legislature and federal Parliament. A commander of militia, Arthur Trefusis died in the North-West Territories of a fever after the Battle of Batoche. His son, and John and Sarah's grandson, was General Arthur Victor Seymour Williams.

John Williams died at his estate, Penryn Park, in Port Hope in 1854. He apparently committed suicide after a period of serious mental illness.
