= Frederick William Lewis =

Canadian politician from Ontario

Member of the Ontario Provincial Parliament for Dufferin
- In office January 25, 1905 – May 24, 1907
- Preceded by: John Barr
- Succeeded by: Charles Robert McKeown

Personal details
- Party: Conservative

Frederick William Lewis (died May 24, 1907) was a Canadian politician from Ontario. He represented Dufferin in the Legislative Assembly of Ontario from 1905 to his death.

== See also ==
- 13th Parliament of Ontario
