= Samuel Sandford Staples =

Canadian politician from Ontario

Member of the Ontario Provincial Parliament for Durham East
- In office October 20, 1919 – May 10, 1923
- Preceded by: Josiah Johnston Preston
- Succeeded by: Albert James Fallis

Personal details
- Party: United Farmers

Samuel Sandford Staples was a Canadian politician from Ontario. He represented Durham East in the Legislative Assembly of Ontario from 1919 to 1923.

== See also ==
- 15th Parliament of Ontario
