= Victoria East (provincial electoral district) =

Ontario electoral district

Defunct provincial electoral district
- Legislature: Legislative Assembly of Ontario
- District created: 1886
- District abolished: 1919
- First contested: 1886
- Last contested: 1914

Victoria East was an electoral riding in Ontario, Canada. It was created in 1886 and was abolished in 1914 before the 1919 election.

== Members of Provincial Parliament ==
Victoria East
Assembly	Years	Member	Party
Created from Victoria North and Victoria South before the 1886 election
6th	1886–1890	John Fell	Conservative
7th	1890–1894	John Fell	Conservative
8th	1894–1898	John Hilliard Carnegie	Conservative
9th	1898–1902	John Hilliard Carnegie	Conservative
10th	1902–1904	John Hilliard Carnegie	Conservative
11th	1905–1908	John Hilliard Carnegie	Conservative
12th	1908–1909	John Hilliard Carnegie	Conservative
12th	1909–1911	Robert Mercer Mason	Conservative
13th	1911–1914	Robert Mercer Mason	Conservative
Sourced from the Ontario Legislative Assembly
Merged into Victoria North and Victoria South before the 1914 election
