= John Fell (Canadian politician) =

Canadian politician

Ontario MPP
- In office 1886–1894
- Preceded by: New riding
- Succeeded by: John Hilliard Carnegie
- Constituency: Victoria East
- In office 1883–1886
- Preceded by: Samuel Stanley Peck
- Succeeded by: Riding abolished
- Constituency: Victoria North

Personal details
- Born: January 21, 1819 Ingleby Greenhow, Yorkshire, England
- Died: February 5, 1901 (aged 82) Somerville Township, Victoria County, Ontario
- Party: Conservative
- Spouse: Jane Carling (m. 1842)
- Occupation: Farmer

John Fell (January 21, 1819 – February 5, 1901) was an Ontario businessman, farmer and political figure. He represented Victoria North from 1883 to 1890 as a Conservative member.

He was born in Ingleby Greenhow, Yorkshire, England in 1819, the son of a farmer, and grew up there. He married Jane Carling in 1842 Fell came to Durham County, Canada West in 1854. He first settled at Cavan but moved to Somerville Township in 1860. He operated a sawmill and shingle mill. Fell was reeve of Somerville and warden for Victoria County. He also served as postmaster for Bury's Green. He ran unsuccessfully in Victoria North in 1879.
