= Wentworth North (provincial electoral district) =

Former provincial electoral district in Ontario, Canada

Ontario electoral district

Defunct provincial electoral district
- Legislature: Legislative Assembly of Ontario
- District created: 1867
- District abolished: 1933
- District re-created: 1967
- District re-abolished: 1996
- First contested: 1867
- Last contested: 1995

Wentworth North was a provincial electoral district in Ontario, Canada. It was created in 1867 at the time of confederation and was abolished in 1933 before the 1934 election. It was re-established in 1967 and then abolished a second time in 1996 before the 1999 election.

== Members of Provincial Parliament ==
Wentworth North
Assembly	Years	Member	Party
1st	1867–1871	Robert Christie	Liberal
2nd	1871–1874	Robert Christie	Liberal
3rd	1875–1875	Thomas Stock	Conservative
3rd	1875–1879	James McMahon	Liberal
4th	1879–1883	James McMahon	Liberal
5th	1883–1886	James McMahon	Liberal
6th	1886–1890	James McMahon	Liberal
7th	1890–1894	James McMahon	Liberal
8th	1894–1898	John Ira Flatt	Liberal
9th	1898–1902	Thomas Atkins Wardell	Conservative
10th	1902–1904	Robert Adam Thompson	Liberal
11th	1905–1908	Robert Adam Thompson	Liberal
12th	1908–1911	Gordon Crooks Wilson	Conservative
13th	1911–1914	James McQueen	Liberal
14th	1914–1919	Arthur Frederick Rykert	Conservative
15th	1919–1923	Frank Campbell Biggs	United Farmers
16th	1923–1926	Frank Campbell Biggs	United Farmers
17th	1926–1929	Alex Laurence Shaver	Conservative
18th	1929–1934	Alex Laurence Shaver	Conservative
Riding merged into Wentworth before 1934 election
Riding re-established in 1967
28th	1967–1971	Ray Connell	Progressive Conservative
29th	1971–1975	Donald Ewen	Progressive Conservative
30th	1975–1977	Eric Cunningham	Liberal
31st	1977–1981	Eric Cunningham	Liberal
32nd	1981–1984	Eric Cunningham	Liberal
32nd	1984–1985	Ann Sloat	Progressive Conservative
33rd	1985–1987	Chris Ward	Liberal
34th	1987–1990	Chris Ward	Liberal
35th	1990–1995	Donald Abel	New Democratic
36th	1995–1999	Toni Skarica	Progressive Conservative
Sourced from the Ontario Legislative Assembly
Merged into Wentworth-Burlington before 1999 election

== Election results ==
1867 Ontario general election
Party	Candidate	Votes	%
Liberal	Robert Christie	1,139	50.44
Conservative	Mr. Miller	1,119	49.56
Total valid votes		2,258	79.93
Eligible voters		2,825	
Liberal pickup new district.			
Source: Elections Ontario

1871 Ontario general election
Party	Candidate	Votes	%	±%
Liberal	Robert Christie	1,071	57.24	+6.80
Conservative	Mr. Wood	800	42.76	−6.80
Turnout		1,871	70.95	−8.98
Eligible voters		2,637		
Liberal hold		Swing		+6.80
Source: Elections Ontario

1875 Ontario general election
Party	Candidate	Votes	%	±%
Conservative	Thomas Stock	1,222	50.48	+7.72
Liberal	Robert Christie	1,199	49.52	−7.72
Total valid votes		2,421	73.72	+2.77
Eligible voters		3,284		
Election voided
Source: Elections Ontario

Ontario provincial by-election, November 1875 Previous election voided
Party	Candidate	Votes	%	±%
Liberal	James McMahon	1,142	52.92	−4.32
Independent	Mr. Miller	1,016	47.08	
Total valid votes		2,158		
Liberal hold		Swing		−4.32
Source: History of the Electoral Districts, Legislatures and Ministries of the Province of Ontario

1879 Ontario general election
Party	Candidate	Votes	%	±%
Liberal	James McMahon	1,223	85.41	+32.49
Conservative	Mr. McMonies	209	14.59	
Total valid votes		1,432	38.23	
Eligible voters		3,746		
Liberal hold		Swing		+32.49
Source: Elections Ontario

== See also ==
- List of Ontario provincial electoral districts
- Canadian provincial electoral districts
