= Dufferin (provincial electoral district) =

Ontario electoral district

Defunct provincial electoral district
- Legislature: Legislative Assembly of Ontario
- District created: 1875
- District abolished: 1934
- First contested: 1875
- Last contested: 1929

Dufferin was an electoral riding in Ontario, Canada. It was created in 1875 and was abolished into Dufferin–Simcoe before the 1934 election.

== Members of Provincial Parliament ==
Dufferin
Assembly	Years	Member	Party
3rd	1875–1879	John Barr	Conservative
4th	1879–1883	William Jelly	Conservative
5th	1883–1886	Robert McGhee	Conservative
6th	1886–1890	Falkner Cornwall Stewart	Conservative
7th	1890–1894	John Barr	Conservative
8th	1894–1898	William Dynes	Patrons of Industry
9th	1898–1902	John Barr	Conservative
10th	1902–1904	John Barr	Conservative
11th	1905–1907	Frederick William Lewis	Conservative
11th	1907–1908	Charles Robert McKeown	Conservative
12th	1908–1911	Charles Robert McKeown	Conservative
13th	1911–1914	Charles Robert McKeown	Conservative
14th	1914–1919	Charles Robert McKeown	Conservative
15th	1919–1923	Thomas Kerr Slack	United Farmers
16th	1923–1926	Charles Robert McKeown	Conservative
17th	1926–1929	Thomas Kerr Slack	Progressive
18th	1929–1934	Thomas Kerr Slack	Progressive
Sourced from the Ontario Legislative Assembly
Merged into Dufferin–Simcoe before the 1934 election

== Election results ==
1929 Ontario general election
Party	Candidate	Votes	%	±%
Progressive	Thomas Kerr Slack	3,778	50.30	–8.57
Conservative	George Harold Campbell	3,733	49.70	+8.57
Total valid votes		7,511	99.40	
Total rejected ballots		45	0.60	+0.15
Turnout		7,556	76.42	+2.70
Eligible voters		9,887		
Progressive hold		Swing		–8.57
Source: Elections Ontario

1926 Ontario general election
Party	Candidate	Votes	%	±%
Progressive	Thomas Kerr Slack	4,478	58.87	+10.34
Conservative	Charles Robert McKeown	3,129	41.13	–10.34
Total valid votes		7,607	99.56	
Total rejected ballots		34	0.45	–1.47
Turnout		7,641	73.73	+0.76
Eligible voters		10,364		
Progressive gain from Conservative		Swing		–
Source: Elections Ontario

1923 Ontario general election
Party	Candidate	Votes	%	±%
Conservative	Charles Robert McKeown	3,898	51.47	+4.97
United Farmers	Thomas Kerr Slack	3,675	48.53	–4.97
Total valid votes		7,573	98.08	
Total rejected ballots		148	1.92	+1.89
Turnout		7,721	72.97	–4.74
Eligible voters		10,581		
Conservative gain from United Farmers		Swing		+4.97
Source: Elections Ontario

1919 Ontario general election
Party	Candidate	Votes	%	±%
United Farmers	Thomas Kerr Slack	4,117	53.50	–
Conservative	John Reburn	3,579	46.50	–10.98
Total valid votes		7,696	99.97	
Total rejected ballots		2	0.03	–0.28
Turnout		7,698	77.71	+2.01
Eligible voters		9,906		
United Farmers gain from Conservative		Swing		–
Source: Elections Ontario

1914 Ontario general election
Party	Candidate	Votes	%	±%
Conservative	Charles Robert McKeown	2,094	57.48	+3.52
Temperance	James Ritchie Bell	1,549	42.52	–
Total valid votes		3,643	99.70	
Total rejected ballots		11	0.30	–0.10
Turnout		3,654	75.70	+13.60
Eligible voters		4,827		
Conservative hold		Swing		+1.76
Source: Elections Ontario

1911 Ontario general election
Party	Candidate	Votes	%	±%
Conservative	Charles Robert McKeown	1,880	53.96	+3.49
Conservative-Temperance	Robert John Woods	1,604	46.04	–3.49
Total valid votes		3,484	99.60	
Total rejected ballots		14	0.40	–0.05
Turnout		3,498	62.10	–22.27
Eligible voters		5,633		
Conservative hold		Swing		+3.49
Source: Elections Ontario

1908 Ontario general election
Party	Candidate	Votes	%	±%
Conservative	Charles Robert McKeown	2,229	50.48	–0.75
Progressive	Robert John Woods	2,187	49.52	+0.75
Total valid votes		4,416	99.55	
Total rejected ballots		20	0.45	+0.45
Turnout		4,436	84.37	–
Eligible voters		5,258		
Conservative hold		Swing		–0.75
Source: Elections Ontario

Ontario provincial by-election, July 24, 1907 Death of Frederick William Lewis
Party	Candidate	Votes	%	±%
Conservative	Charles Robert McKeown	1,943	51.23	–2.65
Progressive	Robert John Woods	1,850	48.77	–
Total valid votes		3,793	100.00	
Total rejected ballots		–		
Turnout		3,793	–	–
Eligible voters				
Conservative hold		Swing		–1.33
Source: Elections Ontario

1905 Ontario general election
Party	Candidate	Votes	%	±%
Conservative	Frederick William Lewis	2,027	53.88	–17.52
Prohibitionist	W. A. Wansborough	1,735	46.12	+17.52
Total valid votes		3,762	99.97	
Total rejected ballots		1	0.03	–0.48
Turnout		3,763	65.39	+14.61
Eligible voters		5,755		
Conservative hold		Swing		–17.52
Source: Elections Ontario

1902 Ontario general election
Party	Candidate	Votes	%	±%
Conservative	John Barr	2,242	71.40	+15.41
Prohibitionist	W. T. Bailey	898	28.60	–
Total valid votes		3,140	99.49	
Total rejected ballots		16	0.51	+0.26
Turnout		3,156	50.78	–15.00
Eligible voters		6,215		
Conservative hold		Swing		+7.71
Source: Elections Ontario

1898 Ontario general election
Party	Candidate	Votes	%	±%
Conservative	John Barr	2,660	55.99	+13.04
Independent	William Dynes	2,091	44.01	–13.04
Total valid votes		4,751	99.75	
Total rejected ballots		12	0.25	–0.37
Turnout		4,763	65.78	–5.50
Eligible voters		7,241		
Conservative gain from Patrons of Industry		Swing		+13.04
Source: Elections Ontario

1894 Ontario general election
Party	Candidate	Votes	%	±%
Patrons of Industry	William Dynes	2,465	57.05	–
Conservative	John Barr	1,856	42.95	–11.75
Total valid votes		4,321	99.38	
Total rejected ballots		27	0.62	+0.09
Turnout		4,348	71.28	+31.10
Eligible voters		6,100		
Patrons of Industry gain from Conservative Equal Rights		Swing		+5.87
Source: Elections Ontario

1890 Ontario general election
Party	Candidate	Votes	%	±%
Conservative Equal Rights	John Barr	1,333	54.70	–
Liberal	W. J. Bailey	603	24.74	–
Equal Rights	Mr. Gaviller	501	20.56	–
Total valid votes		2,437	99.47	
Total rejected ballots		13	0.53	–
Turnout		2,450	40.18	–
Eligible voters		6,097		
Conservative Equal Rights gain from Conservative		Swing		+0.00
Source: Elections Ontario

1886 Ontario general election
Party	Candidate	Votes
Conservative	Falkner Cornwall Stewart	acclaimed
Source: Elections Ontario

1883 Ontario general election
Party	Candidate	Votes	%	±%
Conservative	Robert McGhee	1,051	47.13	–33.93
Independent Conservative	William Jelly	682	30.58	–18.90
Independent Conservative	J. Reed	497	22.29	–
Total valid votes		2,230	99.38	
Total rejected ballots		14	0.62	+0.62
Turnout		2,244	50.18	–
Eligible voters		4,472		
Conservative hold		Swing		–7.51
Source: Elections Ontario

Ontario provincial by-election, January 9, 1880 Void Election
Party	Candidate	Votes	%	±%
Conservative	William Jelly	1,207	49.49	–5.83
Conservative	T. Jull	770	31.57	–23.75
Unknown	Robert McGhee	456	18.70	–25.98
Unknown	Mr. Lawrence	6	0.25	–
Total valid votes		2,439	100.00	
Total rejected ballots		–		
Turnout		2,439	–	–
Eligible voters				
Conservative hold		Swing		+8.96
Source: Elections Ontario

1879 Ontario general election
Party	Candidate	Votes	%	±%
Conservative	John Barr	1,357	55.32	+2.93
Independent	Robert McGhee	1,096	44.68	
Total valid votes		2,453	58.18	−8.05
Eligible voters		4,216		
Conservative gain from Liberal–Conservative		Swing		+2.93
Source: Elections Ontario

1875 Ontario general election
Party	Candidate	Votes	%
Liberal–Conservative	John Barr	982	46.06
Conservative	M. McCarthy	727	34.10
Conservative	T. Armstrong	390	18.29
Liberal	W. Parsons	33	1.55
Turnout		2,132	66.23
Eligible voters		3,219	
Liberal–Conservative pickup new district.			
Source: Elections Ontario
