= John David Smith (Ontario politician) =

Canadian politician

Member of the Ontario Provincial Parliament for Victoria North
- In office January 18, 1875 – August 27, 1875
- Preceded by: Duncan McRae
- Succeeded by: Duncan McRae

Personal details
- Party: Liberal

John David Smith was a Canadian politician from Ontario. He was elected for Victoria North in the Legislative Assembly of Ontario in the 1875 election. Months after the election he was unseated in an election trial.

== See also ==
- 5th Parliament of Ontario
