= Gord Mills =

Canadian politician

Ontario MPP
- In office 1990–1995
- Preceded by: Sam Cureatz
- Succeeded by: John O'Toole
- Constituency: Durham East

Personal details
- Born: March 30, 1928 Brighton, England, in county Sussex
- Died: June 4, 2004 (aged 76) Bowmanville, Ontario
- Party: New Democrat
- Spouse: Cecilia
- Children: 2
- Occupation: Farmer, police officer

Military service
- Allegiance: Canadian
- Branch/service: Canadian Forces Military Police
- Years of service: 1958-1979
- Awards: Canadian Forces' Decoration, (1970); United Nations Medal, (1971)

Gordon Lewis Mills (March 30, 1928 – June 4, 2004) was a politician in Ontario, Canada. He served as a New Democratic member of the Legislative Assembly of Ontario from 1990 to 1995 who represented the eastern Ontario riding of Durham East.

== Background ==
Mills was born in Brighton, England. He worked on a farm and cared for his aging parents. After they died in 1957 he relocated to Canada with his wife Cecilia and their two children. Upon arrival in Canada, he joined the army and served for 21 years and was posted to bases in Canada and Europe. During his time in the military he worked as an intelligence officer and military policeman. He received a General Service Medal from NATO (1964–67), a Canadian Forces Decoration (1970), and a United Nations medal (1971).

After he left the army he worked as a tax auditor for the Ontario government. He had just retired from that job when he accepted the nomination as the New Democratic Party candidate in Durham East.

== Politics ==
From 1976 to 1982, Mills was an alderman in the city of Barrie and also served as deputy mayor. In the provincial election of 1990 he was elected, defeating Progressive Conservative Kirk Kemp. The initial count was 10,930 to 10,922 votes so Kemp requested a recount. The recount increased the spread to 53 votes.

The NDP won a majority government in this election and he was appointed as the parliamentary assistant to the Solicitor-General. As one of the oldest members of the NDP caucus, he was a strong advocate for pension benefits and for including the residents of land-lease communities (many of whom are seniors) under the Landlord and Tenants Act.

In 1994, he came out against the proposed Bill 167, a bill that would have extended spousal benefits to same-sex couples. He said, "Every time you walk down the street people would say 'there goes that guy that supports the queer people.'" He apologized for the remark and while there were calls for him to be removed from caucus he remained unrepentant. He said, "My life doesn't depend on being at Queen's Park, nor do I need the wages or anything. I don't have to be here... all it will mean is I pay less income tax." Premier Bob Rae allowed a free vote on the bill. He was one of 12 NDP members who voted against the legislation. The bill failed on a vote of 59 to 68.

The NDP were defeated in the 1995 provincial election. Mills was defeated in Durham East, finishing second against Progressive Conservative John O'Toole.

== Later life ==
Mills died at the Lakeridge Health Hospital in Bowmanville, Ontario, on June 4, 2004, at the age of 77. Jim Bradley, John O'Toole and Peter Kormos paid tribute to him in the legislature.
