= Sam Cureatz =

Canadian politician

The Honourable Sam Cureatz ECO

Member of the Ontario Provincial Parliament for Durham East
- In office June 9, 1977 – September 6, 1990
- Preceded by: Doug Moffatt
- Succeeded by: Gord Mills

Personal details
- Born: August 20, 1948 (age 77) Brampton, Ontario, Canada
- Party: Progressive Conservative
- Occupation: Lawyer

Sammy Lawrence Cureatz (born August 20, 1948) is a former politician in Ontario, Canada. He was a Progressive Conservative member of the Legislative Assembly of Ontario from 1977 to 1990, and served as a cabinet minister in the government of Frank Miller.

== Background ==
Cureatz was educated at the University of Toronto and Queen's University, earning a law degree from the latter institution. He worked as a barrister and solicitor before entering political life.

== Politics ==
He was elected to the Ontario legislature in the 1977 provincial election, defeating Ontario New Democratic Party (NDP) incumbent Doug Moffatt by 122 votes in the riding of Durham East. He was re-elected by much greater margins in the elections of 1981 and 1985, and retained his seat in the Liberal landslide victory of 1987. He endorsed Dianne Cunningham's unsuccessful bid to lead the Progressive Conservative Party in 1990, and did not seek re-election in that year's provincial election.

Cureatz served as Deputy Speaker of the Ontario Legislature from 1981 to 1983. He appointed as a Minister without Portfolio in Frank Miller's government on May 17, 1985, but accomplished little of significance before Miller's government was defeated in the house.

Cureatz later sought election to the House of Commons of Canada, as a candidate of the Progressive Conservative Party of Canada. He ran in Durham in the federal elections of 1997 and 2000 but finished third on both occasions, behind Liberal Alex Shepherd and candidates of the Reform Party and Canadian Alliance.

=== Parliamentary positions ===
Miller ministry, Province of Ontario (1985)
Sub-Cabinet Post
Predecessor	Title	Successor
	Minister Without Portfolio (1985 May–June)	
Special Parliamentary Responsibilities
Predecessor	Title	Successor
Hugh Edighoffer	Deputy Speaker; 1981-1983	Terry Jones

== After politics ==
Cureatz was appointed a Justice of the Peace in 2002.
