= Edward August =

Canadian politician

Edward Arthur August (15 May 1860 – 31 December 1935) was a politician in Manitoba, Canada. He served in the Legislative Assembly of Manitoba from 1915 to 1922, as a member of the Liberal Party.

August was born in Toronto, Canada West, the son of William August and Mary Ann Ward, and was educated at Horning's Mills in the same province. He worked as a canner, and moved to the Carman district of Manitoba in 1899. In 1884, he married Isabella, the daughter of Robert McGhee. A devout Methodist, he was also active in Christian outreach.

August served on his local municipal council from 1902 to 1904. In the 1907 election, he contested the provincial riding of Dufferin against Conservative Premier Rodmond Roblin. Roblin won the challenge by 171 votes. August challenged Roblin again in the 1914 election, and lost by 139 votes.

Roblin's government was forced to resign amid a corruption scandal in 1915, and the Liberal Party won a landslide majority government in that year's provincial election. August defeated his Conservative opponent, A.S. Argue, by 286 votes. In the legislature, he served as a backbench supporter of Tobias Norris's ministry.

The Liberals were reduced to a minority government in the 1920 provincial election. August was re-elected, defeating Conservative candidate Alexander Morrison by 77 votes. He did not seek re-election in 1922.

August died at Dufferin, Manitoba in 1935.
