= Duncan McRae (politician) =

Canadian politician

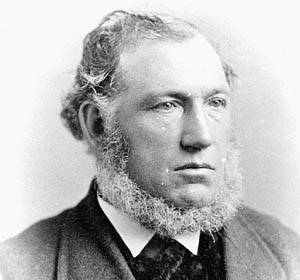

Ontario MPP
- In office 1871–1879
- Preceded by: Alexander Peter Cockburn
- Succeeded by: Samuel Stanley Peck
- Constituency: Victoria North

Personal details
- Born: May 30, 1823 Ross-shire, Scotland
- Died: March 12, 1879 (aged 55) Bolsover, Ontario
- Party: Conservative
- Spouse: Maria McRae (m. 1851)
- Occupation: Farmer

Duncan McRae (May 30, 1823 - March 12, 1879) was an Ontario businessman, farmer and political figure. He represented Victoria North in the Legislative Assembly of Ontario as a Conservative member from 1871 to 1879.

He was born in Ross-shire, Scotland and came to Glengarry County in Upper Canada while still young. He moved to Victoria County around 1850. He was involved in the construction of the Toronto and Nipissing Railway as a contractor. He served as warden of Victoria County. He was elected in 1871 and defeated in 1875 but was elected in a subsequent by-election after the sitting member was unseated after an appeal. He died in office in March 1879 of cancer.

== Electoral history ==
1871 Ontario general election: Victoria North
Party	Candidate	Votes	%	±%
Conservative	Duncan McRae	518	54.76	+17.18
Liberal	Dalton Ullyott	428	45.24	−17.18
Turnout		946	61.55	−18.32
Eligible voters		1,537		
Conservative gain from Liberal		Swing		+17.18
Source: Elections Ontario

1875 Ontario general election: Victoria North
Party	Candidate	Votes	%	±%
Liberal	John David Smith	724	50.14	+4.90
Conservative	Duncan McRae	720	49.86	−4.90
Total valid votes		1,444	68.60	+7.05
Eligible voters		2,105		
Election voided
Source: Elections Ontario

Ontario provincial by-election, September 29, 1875: Victoria North Previous election voided
Party	Candidate	Votes	%	±%
Conservative	Duncan McRae	837	53.79	−0.97
Liberal	P.H. Clark	719	46.21	+0.97
Total valid votes		1,556		
Conservative hold		Swing		−0.97
Source: History of the Electoral Districts, Legislatures and Ministries of the Province of Ontario
