= Thomas Atkins Wardell =

Canadian politician

Ontario MPP
- In office 1898–1902
- Preceded by: John Ira Flatt
- Succeeded by: Robert Adam Thompson
- Constituency: Wentworth North

Personal details
- Born: c. 1865 Dundas, Canada West
- Died: 1902 (aged 36–37) Ottawa, Ontario
- Party: Conservative
- Occupation: Lawyer

Thomas Atkins Wardell (ca. 1865–1902) was an Ontario lawyer and political figure. He represented Wentworth North in the Legislative Assembly of Ontario from 1898 to 1902 as a Conservative member.

He was born in Dundas, Canada West, the son of Alex Richard Wardell, and entered practice with his father. Wardell was mayor of Dundas in 1896.
