= John Ira Flatt =

Canadian politician

Member of Provincial Parliament (Ontario)
- In office 1894–1898
- Preceded by: James McMahon
- Succeeded by: Thomas Atkins Wardell
- Constituency: Wentworth North

Personal details
- Born: July 2, 1834 East Flamborough, Wentworth County, Upper Canada
- Died: November 26, 1913 (aged 79) Hamilton, Ontario
- Party: Liberal
- Spouse: Rachel Cummings (m. 1853)
- Children: 2
- Occupation: Farmer, merchant

John Ira Flatt (July 2, 1834 – November 26, 1913) was an Ontario farmer, merchant and political figure. He represented Wentworth North in the Legislative Assembly of Ontario from 1894 to 1898 as a Liberal member.

He was born in East Flamborough, Wentworth County, Upper Canada in 1834, the son of Robert Flatt, a Scottish immigrant. Flatt was involved in the timber trade, partnering with Robert Thompson until 1876 and then with a Mr. Bradley. The firm, originally based in the Hamilton area, later opened a branch at Casselman. In 1853, he married Rachel Cummings, and with his sons Jacob and William, he also was involved in a timber company operating in Michigan and Ohio. Flatt served on the councils for East and West Flamborough and was also warden for Wentworth County in 1888. He died November 26, 1913.
