= Doug Moffatt =

Canadian politician

Doug Moffat

Ontario MPP
- In office 1975–1977
- Preceded by: New riding
- Succeeded by: Sam Cureatz
- Constituency: Durham East

Personal details
- Born: July 5, 1937 (age 88) Pickering, Ontario
- Party: New Democrat; Liberal
- Spouse: Saundra
- Children: 2
- Occupation: Teacher

Douglas Peter Moffatt (born July 5, 1937) is a former politician in Ontario, Canada. He represented Durham East in the Legislative Assembly of Ontario from 1975 to 1977 as a NDP member. He also served as mayor of Scugog from 1997 to 2003.

== Background ==
Moffat was born in Pickering, Ontario. He was educated at the Toronto Teachers' College and Trent University. He was a school teacher and principal before working seventeen years with United Parcel Service.

== Politics ==
He was elected to the legislature in 1975 defeating Progressive Conservative Charles McIlveen in the newly established riding of Durham East. McIlveen was elected in the existing seat of Oshawa but chose to attempt re-election in Durham East. Moffatt was defeated two years later when he ran for re-election in the 1977 election.

Moffatt served as a member of the Scugog township council and of the Durham regional council and was mayor of Scugog from 1997 to 2003. He helped found the Highlands of Durham Games and served as chairman of the Durham Region Police Services Board and as a director for the Ontario Association of Police Boards. Moffatt ran unsuccessfully for the Durham seat in the 1988 and 2006 federal elections as a Liberal.
