= Thomas Kerr Slack =

Canadian politician

Ontario MPP
- In office 1926–1934
- Preceded by: Charles Robert McKeown
- Succeeded by: Riding abolished
- In office 1919–1923
- Preceded by: Charles Robert McKeown
- Succeeded by: Charles Robert McKeown
- Constituency: Dufferin

Personal details
- Born: February 19, 1875 Dufferin County, Ontario
- Died: November 1, 1956 (aged 81) Shelburne, Ontario
- Party: United Farmers, 1919-1923; Progressive, 1926-1934
- Spouse: Margaret Brown (m. 1905)
- Occupation: Farmer

Thomas Kerr Slack (February 19, 1875 – November 1, 1956) was an Ontario farmer and political figure. He represented Dufferin in the Legislative Assembly of Ontario from 1919 to 1923 as a United Farmers member and from 1926 to 1934 as a Progressive member.

He was born in Melancthon Township, Dufferin County, Ontario, the son of Richard Slack, an immigrant from Ireland, and Elizabeth Silk. In 1905, he married Margaret Brown. Slack served as clerk for Melancthon township. He later moved to Orangeville. He died suddenly at the Shelburne District Hospital in 1956 and was buried in Shelburne Cemetery.
