= William Dynes =

Canadian politician

Ontario MPP
- In office 1894–1898
- Preceded by: John Barr
- Succeeded by: John Barr
- Constituency: Dufferin

Personal details
- Born: 1849 Mono Township, Canada West
- Died: 1935 (aged 85–86) Victoria, British Columbia
- Party: Patrons of Industry
- Occupation: Farmer

William Dynes (1849 – 1935) was an Ontario farmer and political figure. He represented Dufferin in the Legislative Assembly of Ontario from 1894 to 1898 as a Patrons of Industry member.

He was born in Mono Township. Dynes served as reeve for Mono and was the first postmaster for Granger. He was also president of the Dufferin Mutual Fire Insurance Company. He defeated the incumbent, Doctor John Barr, to win a seat in the provincial assembly in 1894 but was defeated by Barr in 1898. In 1906, he moved to Saskatchewan. Dynes died in Victoria, British Columbia.
