= Edgar Watson (politician) =

Canadian politician from Ontario

Member of the Ontario Provincial Parliament for Victoria North
- In office October 20, 1919 – May 10, 1923
- Preceded by: Robert Mercer Mason
- Succeeded by: James Raglan Mark

Personal details
- Party: United Farmers

Edgar Watson was a Canadian politician from Ontario. He represented Victoria North in the Legislative Assembly of Ontario from 1919 to 1923.

== See also ==
- 15th Parliament of Ontario
