= Falkner Cornwall Stewart =

Canadian politician

Ontario MPP
- In office 1886–1890
- Preceded by: Robert McGhee
- Succeeded by: John Barr
- Constituency: Dufferin

Personal details
- Born: August 21, 1833 County Monaghan, Ireland
- Died: April 27, 1897 (aged 63) Orangeville, Ontario
- Party: Conservative
- Spouse: Olive Esther Rutledge (m. 1862)
- Occupation: Merchant

Falkner Cornwall Stewart (August 21, 1833 – April 27, 1897) was an Ontario merchant and political figure. He represented Dufferin in the Legislative Assembly of Ontario as a Conservative member from 1886 to 1890.

He was born in County Monaghan, Ireland in 1833, the son of Robert Cornwall Stewart, and came to Simcoe County, Upper Canada with his parents in 1834. He was educated in Orillia and Barrie. Stewart worked as a clerk in a store in Barrie and then in Toronto, before opening his own business in Cookstown. He moved to Orangeville in 1859 and opened a general store there. In 1862, he married Olive Esther Rutledge. He served as the first reeve of Orangeville and as warden for Dufferin County in 1879 and 1881.

His sister Jennie Francis married judge Thomas Anthony Maitland McCarthy; their son Maitland Stewart McCarthy later served in the Canadian House of Commons.

He died aged 65 in 1897.
