= James Raglan Mark =

Canadian politician from Ontario

Member of the Ontario Provincial Parliament for Victoria North
- In office June 25, 1923 – October 18, 1926
- Preceded by: Edgar Watson
- Succeeded by: William Newman

Personal details
- Party: Conservative

James Raglan Mark was a Canadian politician from the Conservative Party of Ontario. He represented Victoria North in the Legislative Assembly of Ontario from 1923 to 1926.

== See also ==
- 16th Parliament of Ontario
