= Thomas Stock (Canadian politician) =

Canadian politician from Ontario

Member of the Ontario Provincial Parliament for Wentworth North
- In office January 18, 1875 – October 28, 1875
- Preceded by: Robert Christie
- Succeeded by: James McMahon

Personal details
- Party: Conservative

Thomas Stock was a Canadian politician from Ontario. He represented Wentworth North in the Legislative Assembly of Ontario in 1875.

== See also ==
- 3rd Parliament of Ontario
