= Robert Adam Thompson =

Canadian politician

Ontario MPP
- In office 1902–1908
- Preceded by: Thomas Atkins Wardell
- Succeeded by: Gordon Crooks Wilson
- Constituency: Wentworth North

Personal details
- Born: May 9, 1860 Beverly Township, Canada West
- Died: July 1, 1947 (aged 87)
- Party: Liberal
- Spouse: Agnes A. Black (m. 1892)
- Occupation: Merchant

Robert Adam Thompson (May 9, 1860 – July 1, 1947) was a merchant, miller and politician in Ontario, Canada. He represented Wentworth North in the Legislative Assembly of Ontario from 1902 to 1908 as a Liberal.

Thompson was born on May 9, 1860 in Beverly Township, Canada West. He was educated in Wentworth County schools and at the Canadian Business College in Hamilton. In 1892, Thompson married Agnes A. Black. He served on the Beverley township council for two years and was reeve for two years.
