= Victoria North (provincial electoral district) =

Ontario electoral district

Defunct provincial electoral district
- Legislature: Legislative Assembly of Ontario
- District created: 1867
- District abolished: 1933
- First contested: 1867
- Last contested: 1929

Victoria North was an electoral riding in Ontario, Canada. It was created in 1867 at the time of confederation and was abolished in 1933 before the 1934 election.

== Members of Provincial Parliament ==
Victoria North
Assembly	Years	Member	Party
1st	1867–1871	Alexander Peter Cockburn	Liberal
2nd	1871–1874	Duncan McRae	Conservative
3rd	1875–1875	John David Smith	Liberal
3rd	1875–1879	Duncan McRae	Conservative
4th	1879–1883	Samuel Stanley Peck	Liberal
5th	1883–1886	John Fell	Conservative
Victoria East and Victoria West, 1890-1914
14th	1914–1919	Robert Mercer Mason	Conservative
15th	1919–1923	Edgar Watson	United Farmers
16th	1923–1926	James Raglan Mark	Conservative
17th	1926–1929	William Newman	Liberal
18th	1929–1934	William Newman	Liberal
Sourced from the Ontario Legislative Assembly
Merged into Victoria riding before the 1934 election

== Election results ==
1867 Ontario general election
Party	Candidate	Votes	%
Liberal	Alexander Peter Cockburn	676	62.42
Conservative	Joseph Staples	407	37.58
Total valid votes		1,083	79.87
Eligible voters		1,356	
Liberal pickup new district.			
Source: Elections Ontario

1871 Ontario general election
Party	Candidate	Votes	%	±%
Conservative	Duncan McRae	518	54.76	+17.18
Liberal	Dalton Ullyott	428	45.24	−17.18
Turnout		946	61.55	−18.32
Eligible voters		1,537		
Conservative gain from Liberal		Swing		+17.18
Source: Elections Ontario

1875 Ontario general election
Party	Candidate	Votes	%	±%
Liberal	John David Smith	724	50.14	+4.90
Conservative	Duncan McRae	720	49.86	−4.90
Total valid votes		1,444	68.60	+7.05
Eligible voters		2,105		
Election voided
Source: Elections Ontario

Ontario provincial by-election, September 29, 1875 Previous election voided
Party	Candidate	Votes	%	±%
Conservative	Duncan McRae	837	53.79	−0.97
Liberal	P.H. Clark	719	46.21	+0.97
Total valid votes		1,556		
Conservative hold		Swing		−0.97
Source: History of the Electoral Districts, Legislatures and Ministries of the Province of Ontario

1879 Ontario general election
Party	Candidate	Votes	%	±%
Liberal	Samuel Stanley Peck	1,217	56.34	+10.13
Conservative	John Fell	943	43.66	−10.13
Total valid votes		2,160	65.04	
Eligible voters		3,321		
Liberal gain from Conservative		Swing		+10.13
Source: Elections Ontario
