= Charles Robert McKeown =

Canadian lawyer and political figure

Ontario MPP
- In office 1923–1926
- Preceded by: Thomas Kerr Slack
- Succeeded by: Thomas Kerr Slack
- In office 1907–1919
- Preceded by: Frederick William Lewis
- Succeeded by: Thomas Kerr Slack
- Constituency: Dufferin

Personal details
- Born: November 20, 1868 Orangeville, Canada West
- Died: January 13, 1942 (aged 75) Toronto, Ontario
- Party: Conservative
- Spouse: Crystine Innes McIntosh (m. 1895)
- Occupation: Lawyer

Charles Robert McKeown, KC (November 19, 1866 – January 13, 1942) was an Ontario lawyer and political figure. He represented Dufferin in the Legislative Assembly of Ontario from 1907 to 1926 as a Conservative member.

He was born in Orangeville, Canada West, the son of Robert McKeown, and educated at the University of Toronto. He articled in law with William L. Walsh, graduated from Osgoode Hall in 1894 and set up practice in Orangeville. In 1895, he married Crystine Innes McIntosh. He served as mayor of Orangeville in 1906 and 1907. In 1907, McKeown was named King's Counsel. He was elected to the provincial assembly in a 1907 by-election held after the death of Frederick William Lewis. He served as Chairman of the Municipal and Railway Board from 1927 to 1935.

He died at his Toronto home in 1942 after being ill for several weeks.
