= Albert James Fallis =

Canadian politician from Ontario

Member of the Ontario Provincial Parliament for Durham East
- In office June 25, 1923 – October 18, 1926
- Preceded by: Samuel Sandford Staples
- Succeeded by: constituency abolished

Personal details
- Born: January 16, 1859
- Died: November 25, 1935 (aged 76)
- Party: Conservative

Albert James Fallis (16 January 1859 – 25 November 1935) was a Canadian politician from the Conservative Party of Ontario. He represented Durham East in the Legislative Assembly of Ontario from 1923 to 1926.

== See also ==
- 16th Parliament of Ontario
