= Francis H. Burton =

Canadian politician and businessman

Francis Henry Burton (August 17, 1816 – July 28, 1872) was an Ontario businessman and political figure. He represented Durham East in the 1st Canadian Parliament as a Conservative member.

He was born in Galway, Ireland in 1817, the son of the Rev. James Edmund Burton and his first wife. His father brought the family to Canada when he was a child and he was educated at Chambly, Quebec. He operated a mill and distillery in Port Hope. He married Ann Brown, becoming brother-in-law to his step-brother, Henry Howard Meredith. Burton ran unsuccessfully for a seat in the Legislative Assembly of the Province of Canada in 1851 and then represented the East riding of Durham from 1854 to 1861. He was defeated when he ran for reelection in 1861 and 1863. He died in office at Port Hope in 1872.
