= Samuel Stanley Peck =

Canadian politician

Ontario MPP
- In office 1879–1883
- Preceded by: Duncan McRae
- Succeeded by: John Fell
- Constituency: Victoria North

Personal details
- Born: November 20, 1829 Ameliasburgh Township in Prince Edward County, Upper Canada
- Died: November 10, 1901 (aged 71) Petaluma, California
- Party: Liberal
- Spouse: Sarah Ann Harder (m. 1857)
- Occupation: Lawyer

Samuel Stanley Peck (November 20, 1829 – November 10, 1901) was an Ontario lawyer, judge and political figure. He represented Victoria North in the Legislative Assembly of Ontario from 1879 to 1883 as a Liberal member.

He was born in Ameliasburgh Township in Prince Edward County, Upper Canada in 1829, a descendant of United Empire Loyalists. In 1852, he opened the first telegraph office in Napanee for the Great Western Telegraph Company.

He moved to Minden the following year and began the study of law. Peck married Sarah Ann Harder in 1857. He served as reeve for Minden Township and Snowdon Township and as warden for Peterborough County. Throughout 1871-2, he strongly supported building of the Peterborough and Haliburton Railway as well as the Omemee, Bobcaygeon and North Peterboro Junction Railway Company, neither of which were built. He then supported George Laidlaw's Lindsay, Fenelon Falls and Ottawa Railway Company, which became the Victoria Railway. After the Peterborough County Council refused to submit a by-law supporting a railway to the back townships, Peck became the leader of the secessionist movement in October 1873 to form the northern townships of Peterborough and Victoria Counties into a separate judicial district. The Ontario Legislature created the Provisional County and Judicial District of Haliburton in 1874.

Peck served as first county registrar, treasurer and clerk 18 June 1874. and was stipendary magistrate and judge in the division courts for Haliburton County until April 1885. In 1881 he served as one of three census commissioners for Peterborough County. He became reeve for Dysart Township in 1882.

In 1876, he married Susan Vandervoort after the death of his first wife. He moved to South Dakota in 1885 and died in Petaluma, California in 1901.

The geographical township of Peck in Nipissing District was named in his honour.
