= William Armstrong Fallis =

Canadian politician

William Armstrong Fallis (February 22, 1832 – March 2, 1903) was an Ontario farmer and political figure. He represented Durham East in the Legislative Assembly of Ontario as a Conservative member from 1894 to 1902.

He was born in Cavan Township, Upper Canada, the son of Irish immigrants, and was educated there. In 1871, he married Mary A. Kinsman. He served five years on the township council.
