= Durham East (provincial electoral district) =

Former provincial electoral district in Ontario, Canada

Durham East was a provincial electoral district in the Durham Region in Ontario, Canada, that elected members to the Legislative Assembly of Ontario. It contained parts of the towns of Oshawa, Whitby, Scugog, and Newcastle.

The riding first existed from 1867 to 1926, when it was distributed into the Durham riding. When Durham was split back into Durham East and Durham West, as well as Durham North in 1975, the riding existed until 1999 when it was redistributed into Durham, Whitby—Ajax and Haliburton—Kawartha Lakes—Brock.

== Members of Provincial Parliament ==
Durham East
Assembly	Years	Member	Party
Riding created
1st	1867–1871	Arthur Williams	Conservative
2nd	1871–1875	Arthur Williams	Conservative
3rd	1875–1879	John Rosevear	Conservative
4th	1879–1881	John Rosevear	Conservative
4th	1882–1883	Charles Herbert Brereton	Conservative
5th	1883–1886	Charles Herbert Brereton	Conservative
6th	1886–1890	Thomas Dixon Craig	Conservative
7th	1890–1894	George Campbell	Conservative
8th	1894–1898	William Armstrong Fallis	Conservative
9th	1898–1902	William Armstrong Fallis	Conservative
10th	1902–1905	Josiah Johnston Preston	Conservative
11th	1905–1908	Josiah Johnston Preston	Conservative
12th	1908–1911	Josiah Johnston Preston	Conservative
13th	1911–1914	Josiah Johnston Preston	Conservative
14th	1914–1919	Josiah Johnston Preston	Conservative
15th	1919–1923	Samuel Sandford Staples	United Farmers
16th	1923–1926	Albert James Fallis	Conservative
Riding dissolved into Durham
Riding created from Durham
30th	1975–1977	Doug Moffatt	New Democratic
31st	1977–1981	Sam Cureatz	Progressive Conservative
32nd	1981–1985	Sam Cureatz	Progressive Conservative
33rd	1985–1987	Sam Cureatz	Progressive Conservative
34th	1987–1990	Sam Cureatz	Progressive Conservative
35th	1990–1995	Gord Mills	New Democratic
36th	1995–1999	John O'Toole	Progressive Conservative
Riding dissolved into Durham, Whitby—Ajax and Haliburton—Kawartha Lakes—Brock

== Election results ==
=== 1975–1999 ===
1995 Ontario general election
Party	Candidate	Votes	%	±%
Progressive Conservative	John O'Toole	24,303	61.79	+29.20
New Democratic	Gord Mills	8,519	21.66	–11.08
Liberal	Mary Novak	6,512	16.56	–6.85
Total valid votes		39,334	99.13	
Total rejected, unmarked and declined ballots		344	0.87	–0.50
Turnout		39,678	63.79	+0.36
Eligible voters		62,205		
Progressive Conservative gain from New Democratic		Swing		+20.14
Source: Elections Ontario

1990 Ontario general election
Party	Candidate	Votes	%	±%
New Democratic	Gord Mills	10,960	32.74	+8.41
Progressive Conservative	Kirk C. Kemp	10,907	32.58	–7.82
Liberal	Marilyn Pearce	7,836	23.41	–11.86
Family Coalition	Timothy Crookall	2,487	7.43	–
Confederation of Regions	Henry Tunbridge	1,286	3.84	–
Total valid votes		33,476	98.63	
Total rejected, unmarked and declined ballots		465	1.37	+0.61
Turnout		33,941	63.43	+2.79
Eligible voters		53,512		
New Democratic gain from Progressive Conservative		Swing		+10.14
Source: Elections Ontario

1987 Ontario general election
Party	Candidate	Votes	%	±%
Progressive Conservative	Sam Cureatz	11,301	40.40	–6.19
Liberal	Diane Hamre	9,866	35.27	+12.01
New Democratic	Margaret Wilbur	6,805	24.33	–5.82
Total valid votes		27,972	99.24	
Total rejected ballots		214	0.76	+0.14
Turnout		28,186	60.63	+2.59
Eligible voters		46,486		
Progressive Conservative hold		Swing		–9.10
Source: Elections Ontario

1985 Ontario general election
Party	Candidate	Votes	%	±%
Progressive Conservative	Sam Cureatz	15,193	46.59	–1.43
New Democratic	Doug Smith	9,832	30.15	+2.28
Liberal	Steve Ryan	7,584	23.26	–0.03
Total valid votes		32,609	99.38	
Total rejected ballots		202	0.62	+0.28
Turnout		32,811	58.04	–2.32
Eligible voters		56,533		
Progressive Conservative hold		Swing		–1.85
Source: Elections Ontario

1981 Ontario general election
Party	Candidate	Votes	%	±%
Progressive Conservative	Sam Cureatz	14,900	48.02	+6.37
New Democratic	Bruce McArthur	8,648	27.87	–13.39
Liberal	James Potticary	7,226	23.29	+6.70
Independent	Jeff Hubbell	253	0.82	–
Total valid votes		31,027	99.67	
Total rejected ballots		104	0.33	+0.11
Turnout		31,131	60.35	–4.94
Eligible voters		51,580		
Progressive Conservative hold		Swing		+9.88
Source: Elections Ontario

1977 Ontario general election
Party	Candidate	Votes	%	±%
Progressive Conservative	Sam Cureatz	12,862	41.66	+6.71
New Democratic	Doug Moffatt	12,740	41.26	–1.00
Liberal	Joan M. Downey	5,121	16.59	–5.36
Independent	Lloyd Leitch	153	0.50	–
Total valid votes		30,876	99.78	
Total rejected ballots		69	0.22	–0.05
Turnout		30,945	65.29	–4.82
Eligible voters		47,393		
Progressive Conservative gain from New Democratic		Swing		+3.85
Source: Elections Ontario

1975 Ontario general election
Party	Candidate	Votes	%
New Democratic	Doug Moffatt	12,893	42.26
Progressive Conservative	Charles McIlveen	10,664	34.95
Liberal	Kirk Entwisle	6,696	21.95
Social Credit	Rae Beacock	258	0.85
Total valid votes		30,511	99.73
Total rejected ballots		84	0.27
Turnout		30,595	70.12
Eligible voters		43,634	
New Democratic pickup new district.			
Source: Elections Ontario

=== 1867–1926 ===
1923 Ontario general election
Party	Candidate	Votes	%	±%
Conservative	Albert James Fallis	3,040	60.25	+18.14
United Farmers	Samuel Sandford Staples	2,006	39.75	–18.14
Total valid votes		5,046	99.12	
Total rejected ballots		45	0.88	–3.45
Turnout		5,091	63.35	+39.26
Eligible voters		8,036		
Conservative gain from United Farmers		Swing		+18.14
Source: Elections Ontario

1919 Ontario general election
Party	Candidate	Votes	%	±%
United Farmers	Samuel Sandford Staples	1,111	57.89	–
Conservative	Josiah Johnston Preston	808	42.11	–16.72
Total valid votes		1,919	95.66	
Total rejected ballots		87	4.34	+3.89
Turnout		2,006	24.10	–62.52
Eligible voters		8,325		
United Farmers gain from Conservative		Swing		–
Source: Elections Ontario

1914 Ontario general election
Party	Candidate	Votes	%	±%
Conservative	Josiah Johnston Preston	1,720	58.82	–
Temperance	F. W. Galbraith	1,204	41.18	–
Total valid votes		2,924	99.56	
Total rejected ballots		13	0.44	–
Turnout		2,937	86.61	–
Eligible voters		3,391		
Conservative hold		Swing		+0.00
Source: Elections Ontario

1911 Ontario general election
Party	Candidate	Votes
Conservative	Josiah Johnston Preston	acclaimed
Source: Elections Ontario

1908 Ontario general election
Party	Candidate	Votes
Conservative	Josiah Johnston Preston	acclaimed
Source: Elections Ontario

1905 Ontario general election
Party	Candidate	Votes	%	±%
Conservative	Josiah Johnston Preston	1,665	65.60	+4.13
Liberal	W. W. Naismith	873	34.40	–4.13
Total valid votes		2,538	100.00	
Total rejected ballots		–		
Turnout		2,538	60.41	–8.35
Eligible voters		4,201		
Conservative hold		Swing		+4.13
Source: Elections Ontario

1902 Ontario general election
Party	Candidate	Votes	%	±%
Conservative	Josiah Johnston Preston	1,833	61.47	+7.21
Liberal	H. H. Walker	1,149	38.53	–7.21
Total valid votes		2,982	99.47	
Total rejected ballots		16	0.53	+0.53
Turnout		2,998	68.76	–8.79
Eligible voters		4,360		
Conservative hold		Swing		+7.21
Source: Elections Ontario

1898 Ontario general election
Party	Candidate	Votes	%	±%
Conservative	William Armstrong Fallis	1,949	54.26	–2.23
Liberal	Samuel Grandy	1,643	45.74	–
Total valid votes		3,592	100.00	
Total rejected ballots		–		
Turnout		3,592	77.55	+10.71
Eligible voters		4,632		
Conservative hold		Swing		–1.11
Source: Elections Ontario

1894 Ontario general election
Party	Candidate	Votes	%	±%
Conservative	William Armstrong Fallis	1,746	56.49	+7.81
Protestant Protective Association	George Campbell	1,345	43.51	–7.81
Total valid votes		3,091	99.90	
Total rejected ballots		3	0.10	+0.10
Turnout		3,094	66.84	–
Eligible voters		4,629		
Conservative gain from Conservative Equal Rights		Swing		+7.81
Source: Elections Ontario

Ontario provincial by-election, January 23, 1891 Void Election
Party	Candidate	Votes	%	±%
Conservative Equal Rights	George Campbell	1,784	51.32	+1.13
Conservative	T.B. Collins	1,692	48.68	–1.13
Total valid votes		3,476	100.00	
Total rejected ballots		–		
Turnout		3,476	–	–
Eligible voters				
Conservative Equal Rights hold		Swing		+1.13
Source: Elections Ontario

1890 Ontario general election
Party	Candidate	Votes	%	±%
Conservative Equal Rights	George Campbell	1,314	50.19	–
Conservative	T.B. Collins	1,304	49.81	–6.56
Total valid votes		2,618	99.58	
Total rejected ballots		11	0.42	+0.05
Turnout		2,629	55.35	–8.18
Eligible voters		4,750		
Conservative Equal Rights gain from Conservative		Swing		+3.28
Source: Elections Ontario

1886 Ontario general election
Party	Candidate	Votes	%	±%
Conservative	Thomas Dixon Craig	1,696	56.36	+2.51
Liberal	H. H. Burnham	1,313	43.64	–2.51
Total valid votes		3,009	99.64	
Total rejected ballots		11	0.36	–0.24
Turnout		3,020	63.53	–1.81
Eligible voters		4,754		
Conservative hold		Swing		+2.51
Source: Elections Ontario

1883 Ontario general election
Party	Candidate	Votes	%	±%
Conservative	Charles Herbert Brereton	1,496	53.85	–0.39
Liberal	Mr. Elliott	1,282	46.15	–
Total valid votes		2,778	99.39	
Total rejected ballots		17	0.61	+0.61
Turnout		2,795	65.33	–
Eligible voters		4,278		
Conservative hold		Swing		–0.19
Source: Elections Ontario

Ontario provincial by-election, June 29, 1882 Death of John Rosevear
Party	Candidate	Votes	%	±%
Conservative	Charles Herbert Brereton	1,471	54.24	+1.91
Unknown	W.H. Russell	1,241	45.76	–
Total valid votes		2,712	100.00	
Total rejected ballots		–		
Turnout		2,712	–	–
Eligible voters				
Conservative hold		Swing		+0.96
Source: Elections Ontario

1879 Ontario general election
Party	Candidate	Votes	%	±%
Conservative	John Rosevear	1,292	52.33	−2.89
Independent	Mr. Sowden	1,092	44.23	
Independent	Mr. Quinlan	85	3.44	
Total valid votes		2,469	55.58	−14.15
Eligible voters		4,442		
Conservative hold		Swing		−2.89
Source: Elections Ontario

1875 Ontario general election
Party	Candidate	Votes	%
Conservative	John Rosevear	1,454	55.22
Liberal	S.S. Smith	1,179	44.78
Turnout		2,633	69.73
Eligible voters		3,776	
Conservative hold			
Source: Elections Ontario

1871 Ontario general election
Party	Candidate	Votes
Conservative	Arthur Trefusis Heneage Williams	Acclaimed
Source: Elections Ontario

1867 Ontario general election
Party	Candidate	Votes	%
Conservative	Arthur Trefusis Heneage Williams	1,208	95.19
Liberal	S.S. Smith	61	4.81
Total valid votes		1,269	43.88
Eligible voters		2,892	
Conservative pickup new district.			
Source: Elections Ontario

== See also ==
- List of Ontario provincial electoral districts
- Canadian provincial electoral districts
