= William Jelly =

Canadian politician

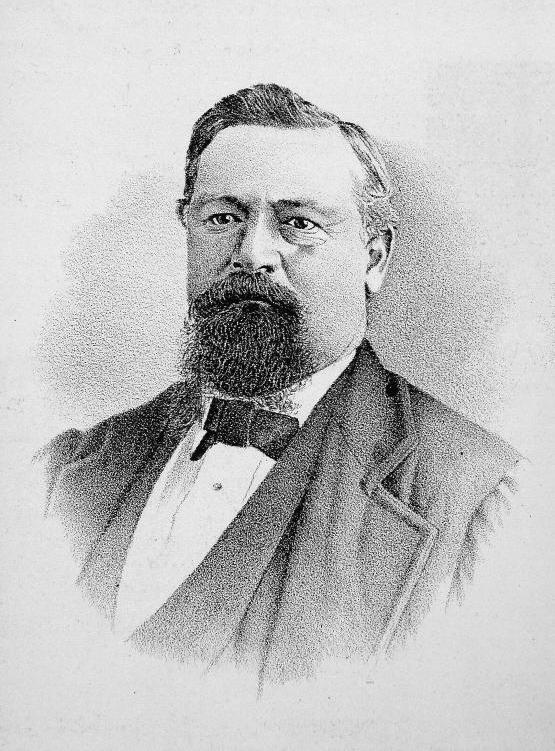

Ontario MPP
- In office 1879–1883
- Preceded by: John Barr
- Succeeded by: Robert McGhee
- Constituency: Dufferin

Personal details
- Born: January 14, 1835 Elizabethtown, Canada West
- Died: October 20, 1900 (aged 65)
- Party: Conservative
- Occupation: Farmer

William Jelly (January 14, 1835 – October 20, 1900) was an Ontario farmer and political figure. He represented Dufferin in the Legislative Assembly of Ontario from 1880 to 1883 as a Conservative member.

He was born near Elizabethtown (later Brockville) in Upper Canada in 1835, the son of John Jelly, an Irish immigrant. Jelly first settled in Amaranth Township then part of Wellington County and later moved to what is now Shelburne. He became a large property owner in the area, built a hotel there and is generally credited as being the founder of the town. Jelly served on the council for Melancthon Township and as the first reeve of Shelburne. He was elected to the provincial assembly after John Barr was unseated following an appeal.
