= John Barr (Canadian politician) =

Canadian politician

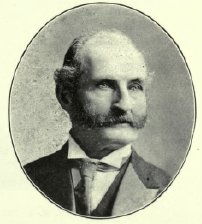

Member of Parliament for Dufferin
- In office 1904–1909
- Preceded by: New riding
- Succeeded by: John Best

Ontario MPP
- In office 1898–1902
- Preceded by: William Dynes
- Succeeded by: John Roaf Barber
- In office 1890–1894
- Preceded by: Falkner Cornwall Stewart
- Succeeded by: William Dynes
- In office 1875–1879
- Preceded by: New riding
- Succeeded by: William Jelly
- Constituency: Dufferin

Personal details
- Born: March 4, 1843 Elizabethtown, Canada West
- Died: November 19, 1909 (aged 66)
- Party: Conservative (Ontario), (1875-1902)
- Other political affiliations: Conservative (Canada), (1904-1909)
- Spouse: Ermina E. Palmer (m. 1880)
- Occupation: Physician

John Barr (March 4, 1843 – November 19, 1909) was an Ontario-based Canadian physician and political figure. He represented Dufferin in the Legislative Assembly of Ontario from 1875 to 1879, from 1890 to 1894 and from 1898 to 1904 and in the House of Commons of Canada from 1904 to 1909 as a Conservative member. From 1890 to 1894, he was a member of the provincial Conservative Equal Rights Party.

He was born near Elizabethtown (later Brockville) in Canada West in 1843, the son of Irish immigrants. He graduated as an M.D. from Victoria University in 1866. Barr served as an associated coroner for Grey County. He was Deputy Master in the South Grey County Orange Lodge. Barr first set up practice in Horning's Mills but later moved to Shelburne. In 1880, he married Ermina E. Palmer. After being reelected in 1879, he was unseated after an appeal. He was later reelected several times to the provincial and federal assemblies. He died in office in 1909.

== Electoral history ==
1875 Ontario general election: Dufferin
Party	Candidate	Votes	%
Liberal–Conservative	John Barr	982	46.06
Conservative	M. McCarthy	727	34.10
Conservative	T. Armstrong	390	18.29
Liberal	W. Parsons	33	1.55
Turnout		2,132	66.23
Eligible voters		3,219	
Liberal–Conservative pickup new district.			
Source: Elections Ontario

1879 Ontario general election: Dufferin
Party	Candidate	Votes	%	±%
Conservative	John Barr	1,357	55.32	+2.93
Independent	Robert McGhee	1,096	44.68	
Total valid votes		2,453	58.18	−8.05
Eligible voters		4,216		
Conservative gain from Liberal–Conservative		Swing		+2.93
Source: Elections Ontario

== Sources ==
- John Barr – Parliament of Canada biography
- Ontario Legislative Assembly parliamentary history
- Gemmill, J.A., ed. (1891). The Canadian Parliamentary Companion. Ottawa: J. Durie & Son. p. 210.
- Johnson, J.K., ed. (1968). The Canadian Directory of Parliament, 1867-1967. Ottawa: Public Archives Canada. p. 23.
