= Otto Faltis =

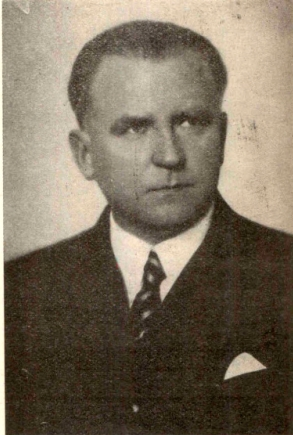

Otto Faltis (30 March 1888 – 26 June 1974) was an Austrian businessman who became a commercial councillor (Kommerzialrat) under the Nazi regime, and was involved in liquidating Jewish art and antique businesses. He was a supporter of Subhas Chandra Bose through the Indian Central-European Society that he organized in Vienna. Faltis was a NSDAP member from 1933 to 1938 (membership number 6106822).

== Life and work ==
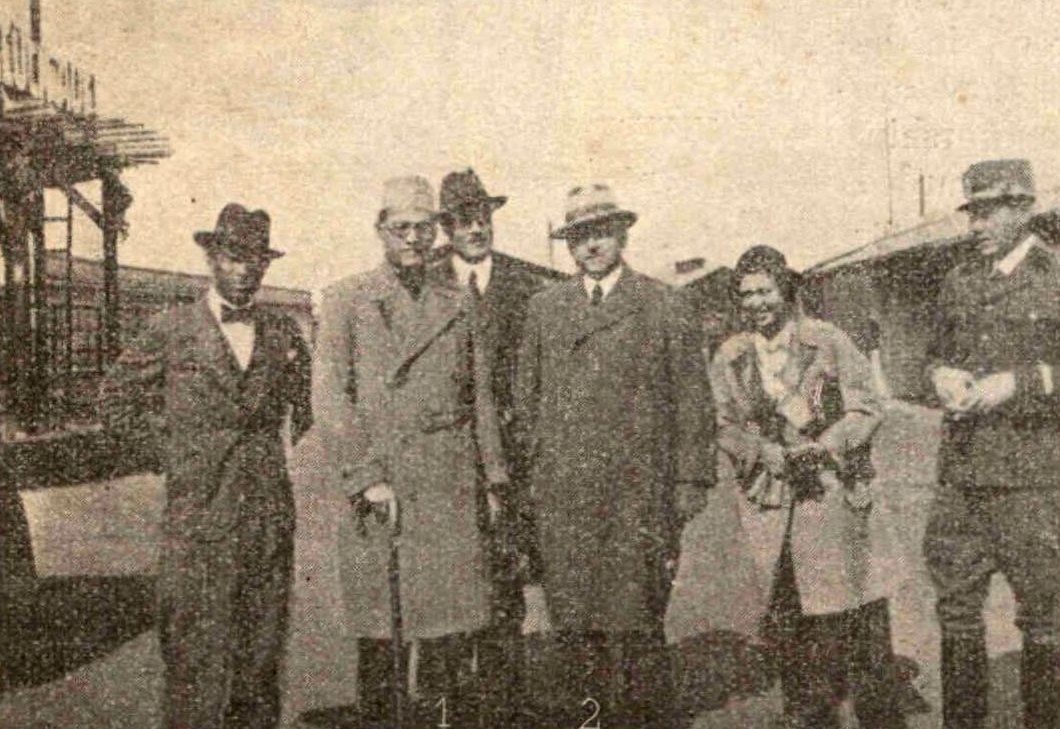
Bose and Faltis in Vienna, c. 1935

Faltis was born in Vienna and was educated at the export academy where he studied mathematics and insurance. He was discharged as invalid following World War I and then went to work in an insurance company before starting Faltis and Cie in 1919 which he became sole owner of in 1927 which worked in the area of agriculture. In 1924 he became a managing director of Österreichischen Eskont-Verbandes. He became a Commercial Councillor in 1934 and was involved in economic decisions. He sought to take over the Leibniz cotton mills which was formerly Jewish-owned but he lost it to another bidder. In 1939 he was given orders to liquidate Jewish-owned antique and art shops, selling their inventories to various bidders and writing reports of progress until 1941. Following the end of the War, Faltis served on the board of the Patria knitwear factory in Heidenreichstein as well as for Nobel AG. He tried to suppress records of his membership in the NSDAP and made no mention of his role in liquidating Jewish businesses. During proceedings of the people's court he claimed that he was not involved in any crimes and that he was only marginally involved. He claimed that he had been expelled from NSDAP membership after failure to prove his wife as "Aryan" and that his membership had been retrospectively been declared void. Proceedings against him were dropped in 1948.

Faltis was invited by Subhas Chandra Bose to Berlin in 1941–42 and had been a supporter but following the war, he destroyed all documents. Faltis remained Bose's agent in Vienna, where he ran the Indian Central-European Society and was close to the Nazi leader Ernst Kaltenbrunner.
