= Abigail Fallis =

British sculptor

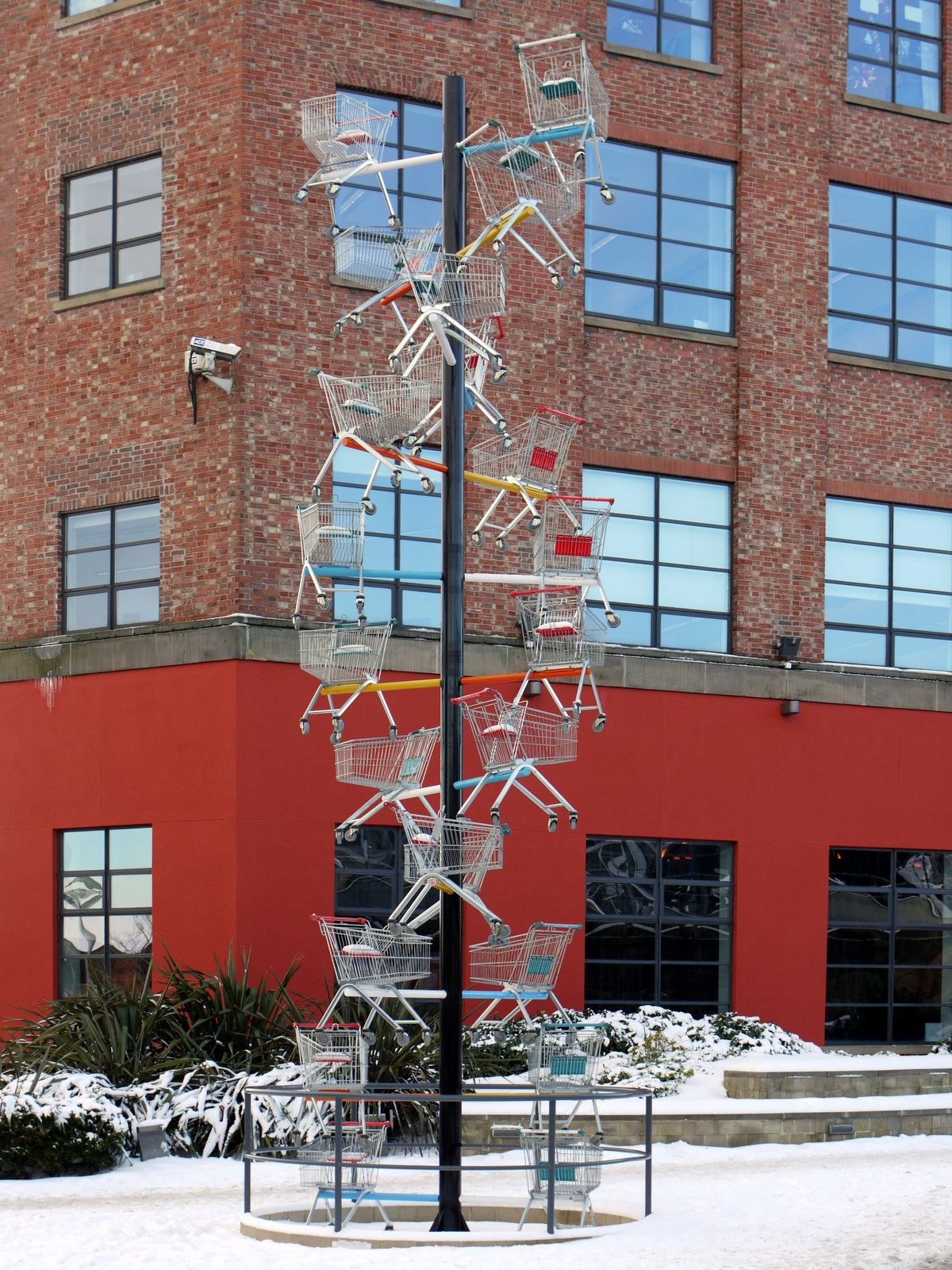
DNA DL90, Newcastle, 2009

Abigail Fallis (born 1968 London) is a British sculptor, known for her commentary about over-consumption and consumerism.

Fallis trained at Camberwell College of Art, London, in silversmithing and metalwork. She initially wanted to be a blacksmith but instead she chose to work with lighter, softer materials. Abigail Fallis focuses on the environment and consumer-led society, in other words her work revolves around modernity. Her art portrays her outlandish sense of humour and commentary on consumerism and the environment.

Fallis's works first brought to public attention include a pair of framed hand stitched Union Jack underpants, entitled Cock-Eyed Jack, a comment on the Cool Britannia phenomenon. These were featured on the BBC documentary "New Brit". In 2009 a public sculpture by Fallis was installed in Central Square, Newcastle, entitled DNA DL90. A monumental 9-meter-high (30 ft) double helix of shopping trolleys, commenting on contemporary consumer culture. The sculpture opening was attended by James Watson, best known as one of the discoverers of the structure of DNA in 1953 with Francis Crick and Rosalind Franklin. Fallis took part in the "Women Make Sculpture" exhibition in 2011, at the Pangolin Gallery, London. She had previously been the gallery's first sculptor-in-residence, for a year from October 2008.

Fallis is much concerned with environmental matters such as overfishing, as shown in her recent exhibition "Fallis in Wonderland". Tom Hodgkinson, editor of The Idler, wrote that Fallis in Wonderland was : “an exhibition of sculptures that are startling in their collision of qualities: for here is wit, beauty and protest; here is life and passion; here is playfulness and fun; here also is awe and wonder; and here is a commentary on an unsustainable way of living...Abigail Fallis’ work takes the fun, the wit and the radical political edge of Dada and combines it with beauty and gentleness and the result is a triumph.” Fallis is also a participant in the "Ghosts of Gone Birds" project, which will raise money and awareness for BirdLife International's Preventing Extinctions programme. Fallis's work is part of many public and private collections including Parabola Land Ltd and The Damien Hirst "Murderme" Collection. Fallis uses various materials in her sculptures including bronze, paper and felt. Regarding her work Fallis has said " I'm a maker, I use my sculpture as a thinking tool. I'm naturally inquisitive and quite sceptical about the way information is relayed to consumers by the media. it is this that fires my imagination and inspires me to make.″ Radio 2 Arts Show with Claudia Winkleman, interview with Penny Smith for Women Make Sculpture".
