= James McMahon (Canadian politician) =

Canadian politician

Ontario MPP
- In office 1875–1894
- Preceded by: Thomas Stock
- Succeeded by: John Ira Flatt
- Constituency: Wentworth North

Personal details
- Born: July 1, 1830 Dundas, Upper Canada
- Died: July 1, 1909 (aged 79) Toronto, Ontario
- Party: Liberal
- Spouse: Julia Ball (m. 1858)
- Occupation: Doctor

James McMahon (July 1, 1830 – 1909) was an Ontario doctor and political figure. He represented Wentworth North in the Legislative Assembly of Ontario as a Liberal member from 1875 to 1894.

He was born in Dundas, Upper Canada in 1830, the son of Irish immigrants who came to Upper Canada in 1819. He studied medicine with James Mitchell in Dundas, attended the University of Toronto and received a medical degree from Victoria College. He was licensed as a doctor and then set up practice in Ayr in 1850. He returned to Dundas in 1852 and joined the practice of Doctor Mitchell. After Mitchell died of cholera in 1854, McMahon took over his practice. He married Julia Ball in 1858. McMahon served on the town council for Dundas and was mayor in 1866. After the sitting member Thomas Stock was disqualified, he was elected in an 1875 by-election to represent Wentworth North in the Ontario legislative assembly.

== Electoral history ==
Ontario provincial by-election, November 1875: Wentworth North Previous election voided
Party	Candidate	Votes	%	±%
Liberal	James McMahon	1,142	52.92	−4.32
Independent	Mr. Miller	1,016	47.08	
Total valid votes		2,158		
Liberal hold		Swing		−4.32
Source: History of the Electoral Districts, Legislatures and Ministries of the Province of Ontario
