= Josiah Johnston Preston =

Canadian politician and merchant

Josiah Johnston Preston (June 7, 1855 – July 10, 1937) was an Ontario merchant and political figure. He represented Durham East in the Legislative Assembly of Ontario from 1902 to 1919 as a Conservative member.

He was born in Manvers Township, Durham County, Canada West, the son of James Preston. Preston was a grain dealer. He served as reeve for Manvers and was also warden for the United Counties of Northumberland and Durham in 1897. He became clerk for the township in 1898. He was defeated in the 1919 election. Preston was a member of the Orange Order and a freemason.
