= Charles Herbert Brereton =

Canadian politician

MPP for Durham East
- In office June 29, 1881 – November 15, 1886

Personal details
- Born: January 8, 1845 West Gwillimbury, Canada West
- Died: September 6, 1908 (aged 63) Carnduff, Saskatchewan
- Party: Progressive Conservative Party of Ontario

Charles Herbert Brereton (January 8, 1845 – September 6, 1908) was an Ontario medical doctor and political figure. He represented Durham East in the Legislative Assembly of Ontario from 1882 to 1886 as a Conservative member.

He was born in West Gwillimbury, Canada West in 1845, the son of Cloudesley Shovell Brereton who came to Upper Canada from Norfolk, England. He studied at Victoria College in Cobourg and, after completing his studies in medicine, set up practice in Bethany. He married Eliza L. Proctor in 1876. Brereton was first elected to the provincial assembly in a by-election held after the death of John Rosevear and was reelected in the general election held in 1883. He served as lieutenant in the Durham Field Battery for a number of years. Brereton was a member of the local Freemason lodge.

He died at his son's home in Saskatchewan in 1908.
