= Robert Mercer Mason =

Canadian politician from Ontario

Member of the Ontario Provincial Parliament for Victoria East (1909–1914) Victoria North (1914–1919)
- In office May 25, 1909 – September 23, 1919
- Preceded by: Charles Martin Bowman
- Succeeded by: Edgar Watson

Personal details
- Party: Conservative

Robert Mercer Mason was a Canadian politician from Ontario. He was a member of the Legislative Assembly of Ontario for the ridings of Victoria East and Victoria North between a 1909 by-election and the 1919 Ontario general election.

== Biography ==
Mason was born in South Simcoe, Ontario. After graduating from the Ontario Veterinary College in 1884, he practised in Mono Mills, Ontario for 5 years. He moved to Fenelon Falls in the spring of 1889. Before his arrival in the village, there was no regular veterinary service; sick animals were tended by the local blacksmith, treated by vets passing through the area, or taken to Lindsay, Ontario. While saw mills and factories using horses often had a resident vet, they did not stay long and may not have been available to the community. Mason may have come to the village on a trial basis: the Fenelon Falls Gazette wrote that he “has done so well since he came to the Falls that he has decided to stay”. He took up residence at the corner of Colborne and Louisa Streets. By 1891 his practice had grown so large that he hired an assistant, Mr. J.W. Smelser.

He served on the Fenelon Falls Council several terms, and was reeve for 2 years. He was a member of the present School Board, and was the President of the Fenelon Falls Agricultural Society.

He died in July 5th, 1920, and was buried in the Fenelon Falls Cemetery.

== See also ==
- 12th Parliament of Ontario
- 13th Parliament of Ontario
- 14th Parliament of Ontario
