= John Rosevear =

Canadian politician

John Rosevear (died May 5, 1881) was an Ontario political figure. He represented Durham East in the Legislative Assembly of Ontario from 1875 to 1881 as a Conservative member.

He served as reeve for Port Hope and was a major in the local militia. He died in office in 1881.

== Electoral history ==
1875 Ontario general election: Durham East
Party	Candidate	Votes	%
Conservative	John Rosevear	1,454	55.22
Liberal	S.S. Smith	1,179	44.78
Turnout		2,633	69.73
Eligible voters		3,776	
Conservative hold			
Source: Elections Ontario

1879 Ontario general election: Durham East
Party	Candidate	Votes	%	±%
Conservative	John Rosevear	1,292	52.33	−2.89
Independent	Mr. Sowden	1,092	44.23	
Independent	Mr. Quinlan	85	3.44	
Total valid votes		2,469	55.58	−14.15
Eligible voters		4,442		
Conservative hold		Swing		−2.89
Source: Elections Ontario
