= George Campbell (Canadian politician) =

Canadian politician and farmer

George Campbell (June 2, 1844 – ) was a farmer and political figure in Ontario. He represented Durham East in the Legislative Assembly of Ontario from 1890 to 1894 as a Conservative Equal Rights member.

He was born in Hope township, the son of an Irish immigrant. In 1878, Campbell married Margaret Walsh. He served as deputy reeve and then reeve of Cavan township. Campbell's election in 1890 was overturned but he was reelected in the subsequent by-election held in 1891. Campbell lived in Millbrook.
