= 1875 Ontario general election =

Canadian provincial election

- January 18, 1875

88 seats in the 3rd Legislative Assembly of Ontario 45 seats were needed for a majority
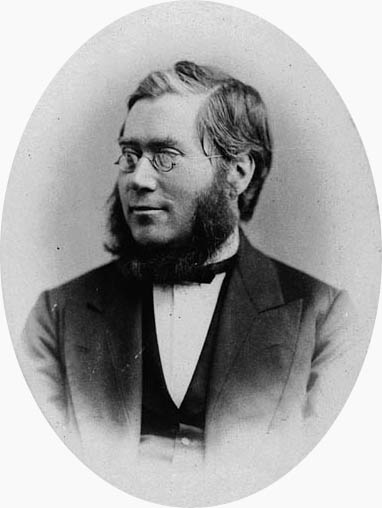

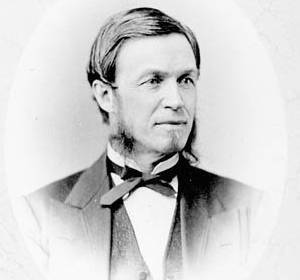
	First party	Second party
Leader	Oliver Mowat	Matthew Crooks Cameron
Party	Liberal	Conservative
Leader since	1872	1871
Leader's seat	Oxford North	Toronto East
Last election	43	38
Seats won	50	34
Seat change	▲7	▼4
Premier before election
Oliver Mowat
Liberal
Premier after election
Oliver Mowat
Liberal

The 1875 Ontario general election was the third general election held in the province of Ontario, Canada. It was held on January 18, 1875, to elect the 88 Members of the 3rd Legislative Assembly of Ontario ("MLAs").

The Ontario Liberal Party, led by Oliver Mowat, increased its majority in the Legislature for its second term in government.

The Ontario Conservative Party, led by Matthew Crooks Cameron lost four of its seats.

== Electoral reforms ==
The Legislative Assembly had passed several pieces of legislation that impacted on the current election:

- Members of the House of Commons of Canada were disqualified from holding a provincial seat.
- The prior practice of voting by open declaration was abolished. This election allowed voters to vote secretly, using a marked ballot.

== Redistribution of ridings ==
The Assembly was increased from 82 to 88 members, through the following changes:

Abolished ridings	New ridings
Divisions of ridings
Essex	Essex North; Essex South
Lambton	Lambton East; Lambton West
Creation of riding from parts of others
	Dufferin (Note: formed from parts of Cardwell, Grey South, Wellington North, Wellington Centre and Simcoe South)
	Muskoka and Parry Sound (Note: taken from Simcoe North)
Mergers of ridings
Lincoln; Niagara	Lincoln
Reorganization of ridings
Grey North; Grey South	Grey North; Grey East; Grey South
Huron North; Huron South	Huron East; Huron South; Huron West
Bothwell; Kent	Kent East; Kent West
Simcoe North; Simcoe South	Simcoe East; Simcoe South; Simcoe West
Wellington Centre; Wellington North; Wellington South	Wellington Centre; Wellington South; Wellington West

Elections to the 3rd Parliament of Ontario (1875)
Political party	Party leader	MLAs				Votes			
Political party	Party leader	Candidates	1871	1875	±	#	±	%	± (pp)
Liberal	Oliver Mowat	84	43	49	6▲	90,809	22,443▲	47.55%	4.75▼
Conservative	Matthew Crooks Cameron	81	38	35	3▼	87,802	27,876▲	45.98%	0.13▲
Liberal–Conservative	Matthew Crooks Cameron	1	–	1	1▲	1,553	1,553▲	0.81%	New
Independent Conservative		2	–	2	2▲	2,129	2,129▲	1.11%	New
Independent Liberal		1	–	1	1▲	1,125	1,125▲	0.59%	New
Conservative-Liberal		1	1	–	1▼	791	325▼	0.41%	0.44▼
Independent		11	–	–	–	6,757	5,454▲	3.54%	2.54▲
Total		181	82	88		190,966		100.00%	
Voter turnout						190,966	60,255▲	67.28	4.35▲
Registered electors						283,856	76,139▲		
Acclamations		█ Liberal		8					
Acclamations		█ Conservative		1					

Seats and popular vote by party
Party	Seats	Votes	Change (pp)
█ Liberal	49 / 88	47.55%	-4.75
█ Conservative	36 / 88	47.20%	0.50
█ Other	3 / 88	5.25%	4.25

=== Synopsis of results ===
Results by riding - 1875 Ontario general election
Riding	Winning party						Turnout	Votes							
Name (Note: order is as given in EO reports)	1871	Party	Votes	Share	Margin #	Margin %	Turnout	Lib	Con	LC	CL	I-Lib	I-Con	Ind	Total
Addington	Lib	Lib	1,453	60.77%	515	21.54%	67.91%	1,453	938	–	–	–	–	–	2,391
Algoma	Con	Lib	510	64.31%	227	28.63%	91.25%	510	283	–	–	–	–	–	793
Brant North	Lib	Lib	747	54.17%	115	8.34%	62.54%	747	632	–	–	–	–	–	1,379
Brant South	Con	Lib	acclaimed												
Brockville	Con	Lib	1,247	51.51%	73	3.02%	71.35%	1,247	1,174	–	–	–	–	–	2,421
Bruce North	Lib	Lib	1,232	55.95%	262	11.90%	68.75%	1,232	–	–	–	–	–	970	2,202
Bruce South	Lib	Lib	1,864	65.87%	898	31.73%	49.26%	1,864	966	–	–	–	–	–	2,830
Cardwell	CL	Con	1,208	52.80%	128	5.59%	66.82%	1,080	1,208	–	–	–	–	–	2,288
Carleton	Con	Con	acclaimed												
Cornwall	Con	Con	499	50.25%	5	0.50%	68.44%	494	499	–	–	–	–	–	993
Dufferin	New	Con	982	46.06%	255	11.96%	66.23%	33	2,099	–	–	–	–	–	2,132
Dundas	Lib	Con	1,458	51.67%	94	3.33%	74.99%	1,364	1,458	–	–	–	–	–	2,822
Durham East	Con	Con	1,454	55.22%	275	10.44%	69.73%	1,179	1,454	–	–	–	–	–	2,633
Durham West	Lib	Lib	1,257	53.95%	184	7.90%	71.52%	1,257	1,073	–	–	–	–	–	2,330
Elgin East	Lib	Lib	1,924	50.31%	24	0.63%	73.85%	1,924	1,900	–	–	–	–	–	3,824
Elgin West	Lib	Con	1,101	50.23%	10	0.46%	78.01%	1,091	1,101	–	–	–	–	–	2,192
Essex North	New	Con	1,209	61.56%	454	23.12%	54.37%	–	1,209	–	–	–	–	755	1,964
Essex South	New	Con	1,014	51.19%	47	2.37%	69.61%	967	1,014	–	–	–	–	–	1,981
Frontenac	Con	Con	884	59.61%	285	19.22%	55.92%	599	884	–	–	–	–	–	1,483
Glengarry	Con	I-Lib	1,125	51.07%	47	2.13%	74.08%	1,078	–	–	–	1,125	–	–	2,203
Grenville South	Con	Lib	1,136	53.36%	143	6.72%	71.04%	1,136	993	–	–	–	–	–	2,129
Grey East	New	Con	1,297	67.55%	674	35.10%	53.42%	623	1,297	–	–	–	–	–	1,920
Grey North	Con	Con	1,431	53.40%	182	6.79%	67.59%	1,249	1,431	–	–	–	–	–	2,680
Grey South	Con	Lib	1,017	46.27%	293	13.33%	69.29%	1,017	457	–	–	–	–	724	2,198
Haldimand	Lib	Lib	1,476	53.87%	212	7.74%	75.84%	1,476	1,264	–	–	–	–	–	2,740
Halton	Lib	Lib	1,609	52.58%	158	5.16%	68.18%	1,609	1,451	–	–	–	–	–	3,060
Hamilton	Lib	Lib	acclaimed												
Hastings East	Con	I-Con	1,064	63.37%	493	29.36%	58.20%	–	615	–	–	–	1,064	–	1,679
Hastings North	Con	Con	960	55.14%	179	10.28%	74.62%	781	960	–	–	–	–	–	1,741
Hastings West	Con	Con	720	36.87%	102	5.22%	65.94%	615	720	–	–	–	–	618	1,953
Huron East	New	Lib	1,530	52.92%	169	5.85%	70.89%	1,530	1,361	–	–	–	–	–	2,891
Huron South	Lib	Lib	1,440	51.39%	78	2.78%	72.53%	1,440	1,362	–	–	–	–	–	2,802
Huron West	New	Lib	1,595	51.48%	92	2.97%	68.59%	1,595	1,503	–	–	–	–	–	3,098
Kent East	New	Lib	1,425	51.76%	97	3.52%	66.27%	1,425	1,328	–	–	–	–	–	2,753
Kent West	New	Con	1,440	52.67%	146	5.34%	58.64%	1,294	1,440	–	–	–	–	–	2,734
Kingston	Con	Con	935	54.17%	144	8.34%	64.55%	–	935	–	791	–	–	–	1,726
Lambton East	New	Lib	1,443	53.35%	181	6.69%	70.74%	1,443	1,262	–	–	–	–	–	2,705
Lambton West	New	Lib	1,372	64.53%	618	29.07%	57.23%	1,372	754	–	–	–	–	–	2,126
Lanark North	Lib	Con	913	50.72%	26	1.44%	80.07%	887	913	–	–	–	–	–	1,800
Lanark South	Con	Con	1,234	53.68%	169	7.35%	72.57%	1,065	1,234	–	–	–	–	–	2,299
Leeds North and Grenville North	Con	Con	1,035	61.57%	389	23.14%	66.63%	–	1,035	–	–	–	–	646	1,681
Leeds South	Con	Con	1,481	58.70%	439	17.40%	79.87%	1,042	1,481	–	–	–	–	–	2,523
Lennox	Con	I-Con	1,065	54.36%	555	28.33%	53.47%	510	–	–	–	–	1,065	384	1,959
Lincoln	New	Lib	2,065	51.38%	111	2.76%	75.25%	2,065	1,954	–	–	–	–	–	4,019
London	Con	Con	1,311	52.84%	141	5.68%	60.39%	1,170	1,311	–	–	–	–	–	2,481
Middlesex East	Con	Con	2,185	53.11%	256	6.22%	72.87%	1,929	2,185	–	–	–	–	–	4,114
Middlesex North	Lib	Con	1,565	54.89%	279	9.79%	72.77%	1,286	1,565	–	–	–	–	–	2,851
Middlesex West	Lib	Lib	1,415	54.30%	224	8.60%	71.36%	1,415	1,191	–	–	–	–	–	2,606
Monck	Con	Lib	1,412	56.21%	312	12.42%	74.47%	1,412	1,100	–	–	–	–	–	2,512
Muskoka and Parry Sound	New	Lib	839	58.63%	247	17.26%	65.52%	839	592	–	–	–	–	–	1,431
Norfolk North	Lib	Lib	1,417	52.19%	119	4.38%	75.77%	1,417	1,298	–	–	–	–	–	2,715
Norfolk South	Lib	Con	1,293	58.27%	367	16.54%	64.71%	–	1,293	–	–	–	–	926	2,219
Northumberland East	Lib	Lib	1,551	48.27%	103	3.21%	74.62%	1,765 (Note: the incumbent William Wilson Webb received 214 votes)	1,448	–	–	–	–	–	3,213
Northumberland West	Lib	Lib	1,251	52.59%	123	5.17%	70.78%	1,251	1,128	–	–	–	–	–	2,379
Ontario North	Lib	Lib	1,858	51.84%	132	3.68%	68.24%	1,858	1,726	–	–	–	–	–	3,584
Ontario South	Lib	Con	1,614	50.52%	33	1.03%	72.91%	1,581	1,614	–	–	–	–	–	3,195
Ottawa	Lib	Lib	852	35.35%	52	2.16%	54.25%	1,652 (Note: the incumbent Daniel John O'Donoghue was returned)	758	–	–	–	–	–	2,410
Oxford North	Lib	Lib	acclaimed												
Oxford South	Lib	Lib	1,305	44.27%	43	1.46%	66.05%	1,305	1,262	–	–	–	–	381	2,948
Peel	Con	Lib	1,349	51.98%	103	3.97%	72.95%	1,349	1,246	–	–	–	–	–	2,595
Perth North	Con	Lib	1,847	51.69%	140	3.92%	68.16%	1,847	1,726 (Note: the incumbent Thomas Mayne Daly received 1,707 votes)	–	–	–	–	–	3,573
Perth South	Con	Lib	1,508	53.23%	183	6.46%	70.98%	1,508	1,325	–	–	–	–	–	2,833
Peterborough East	Con	Con	759	52.13%	62	4.26%	67.47%	697	759	–	–	–	–	–	1,456
Peterborough West	Lib	Lib	970	51.19%	45	2.37%	71.27%	970	925	–	–	–	–	–	1,895
Prescott	Con	Con	988	62.57%	397	25.14%	59.61%	591	988	–	–	–	–	–	1,579
Prince Edward	Lib	Lib	1,762	50.91%	63	1.82%	77.90%	1,762	1,699	–	–	–	–	–	3,461
Renfrew North	Con	Con	894	53.44%	115	6.87%	76.71%	779	894	–	–	–	–	–	1,673
Renfrew South	Con	Lib	acclaimed												
Russell	Con	Con	1,066	61.30%	393	22.60%	49.10%	673	1,066	–	–	–	–	–	1,739
Simcoe East	New	Con	1,133	54.00%	168	8.01%	73.90%	965	1,133	–	–	–	–	–	2,098
Simcoe South	Con	Con	1,057	58.17%	297	16.35%	67.15%	760	1,057	–	–	–	–	–	1,817
Simcoe West	New	Con	1,353	51.15%	61	2.31%	67.63%	1,292	1,353	–	–	–	–	–	2,645
Stormont	Con	Lib	948	53.77%	133	7.54%	77.19%	948	815	–	–	–	–	–	1,763
Toronto East	Con	Con	1,849	53.83%	270	7.86%	54.42%	1,579	1,849	–	–	–	–	–	3,435
Toronto West	Lib	Con	2,145	50.71%	60	1.42%	55.31%	2,085	2,145	–	–	–	–	–	4,230
Victoria North	Con	Lib	724	50.14%	4	0.28%	68.60%	724	720	–	–	–	–	–	1,444
Victoria South	Lib	Lib	1,326	56.38%	300	12.76%	68.29%	1,326	1,026	–	–	–	–	–	2,352
Waterloo North	Lib	Lib	1,363	67.71%	713	35.42%	70.31%	1,363	650	–	–	–	–	–	2,013
Waterloo South	Lib	Lib	acclaimed												
Welland	Lib	Lib	1,719	51.16%	78	2.32%	69.48%	1,719	1,641	–	–	–	–	–	3,360
Wellington Centre	Lib	Lib	acclaimed												
Wellington South	Lib	Lib	acclaimed												
Wellington West	New	L-Con	1,553	51.63%	98	3.26%	73.82%	1,455	–	1,553	–	–	–	–	3,008
Wentworth North	Lib	Con	1,222	50.48%	23	0.95%	73.72%	1,199	1,222	–	–	–	–	–	2,421
Wentworth South	Lib	Lib	944	71.14%	561	42.28%	44.70%	944	383	–	–	–	–	–	1,327
York East	Lib	Lib	1,266	54.26%	199	8.53%	63.16%	1,266	1,067	–	–	–	–	–	2,333
York North	Con	Lib	1,835	57.69%	489	15.37%	65.36%	1,835	–	–	–	–	–	1,346	3,181
York West	Lib	Lib	acclaimed												

= open seat
= turnout is above provincial average
= winning candidate was in previous Legislature
= incumbent had switched allegiance
= previously incumbent in another riding
= not incumbent; was previously elected to the Legislature
= incumbency arose from byelection gain
= other incumbents renominated
= previously an MP in the House of Commons of Canada
= multiple candidates

=== Analysis ===
Party candidates in 2nd place
Party in 1st place	Party in 2nd place					Total
Party in 1st place	Accl	Lib	Con	Ind	Con-L	Total
Liberal	8	1	37	3		49
Conservative	1	28	1	4	1	35
Independent Conservative		1	1			2
Liberal–Conservative		1				1
Independent Liberal		1				1
Total	9	32	39	7	1	88

Candidates ranked 1st to 5th place, by party
Parties	Accl	1st	2nd	3rd	4th	5th
█ Liberal	8	41	32	2	1	
█ Conservative	1	34	39	6		1
█ Independent Conservative		2				
█ Liberal–Conservative		1				
█ Independent Liberal		1				
█ Independent			7	3	1	
█ Conservative-Liberal			1			

Resulting composition of the 2nd Legislative Assembly of Ontario
Source		Party					
Source		Lib	Con	L-Con	I-Con	I-Lib	Total
Seats retained	Incumbents returned	20	9				29
Seats retained	Returned by acclamation	6	1				
Seats retained	Open seats held	1	8				9
Seats retained	Byelection loss reversed	2	1				3
Seats changing hands	Incumbents defeated	3	7				10
Seats changing hands	Open seats gained	4	2		1	1	8
Seats changing hands	Byelection gains held	5					5
Seats changing hands	Incumbent changing allegiance				1		2
Seats changing hands	Returned by acclamation	1					1
New seats	New MLAs	4	5				9
New seats	Previously incumbent in another riding	3	2	1			6
Total		49	35	1	2	1	88

=== MLAs elected by region and riding ===
Party designations are as follows:

Liberal
Conservative
Liberal-Conservative
Independent Conservative
Independent Liberal

Northern Ontario

- Algoma: Simon James Dawson

Ottawa Valley

- Carleton: George William Monk
- Lanark North: William Mostyn
- Lanark South: Abraham Code
- Ottawa: Daniel John O'Donoghue
- Prescott: William Harkin
- Renfrew North: Thomas Deacon
- Renfrew South: James Bonfield
- Russell: Adam Jacob Baker

Saint Lawrence Valley

- Brockville: Wilmot Howard Cole
- Cornwall: Alexander Fraser McIntyre
- Dundas: Andrew Broder
- Glengarry: Alexander James Grant (I-Lib)
- Grenville South: Christopher Finlay Fraser
- Kingston: William Robinson
- Leeds North and Grenville North: Henry Merrick
- Leeds South: Robert Henry Preston
- Stormont: James Bethune

Central Ontario

- Addington: Hammel Madden Deroche
- Durham East: John Rosevear
- Durham West: John McLeod
- Frontenac: Peter Graham
- Hastings East: Nathaniel Stephen Appleby (I-Con)
- Hastings North: George Henry Boulter
- Hastings West: Thomas Wills
- Lennox: John Thomas Grange (I-Con)
- Northumberland East: James Marshall Ferris
- Northumberland West: William Hargraft
- Peterborough East: John C. O'Sullivan
- Peterborough West: George Albertus Cox
- Prince Edward: Gideon Striker
- Victoria North: John David Smith
- Victoria South: Samuel Casey Wood

Georgian Bay

- Bruce North: Donald Sinclair
- Grey North: Thomas Scott
- Muskoka and Parry Sound: John Classon Miller
- Simcoe East: John Kean
- Simcoe South: D'Arcy Edward Boulton
- Simcoe West: Thomas Long

Wentworth/Halton/Niagara

- Halton: William Barber
- Hamilton: James Miller Williams
- Lincoln: Sylvester Neelon
- Monck: Henry Ryan Haney
- Welland: James George Currie
- Wentworth North: Thomas Stock
- Wentworth South: William Sexton

Midwestern Ontario

- Brant North: Hugh Finlayson
- Brant South: Arthur Sturgis Hardy
- Bruce South: Rupert Mearse Wells
- Dufferin: John Barr
- Grey East: Abram William Lauder
- Grey South: James Hill Hunter
- Haldimand: Jacob Baxter
- Huron East: Thomas Gibson
- Huron South: Archibald Bishop
- Huron West: Alexander McLagan Ross
- Norfolk North: John Fitzgerald Clarke
- Norfolk South: Richard Richardson
- Oxford North: Oliver Mowat
- Oxford South: Adam Oliver
- Perth North: David Davidson Hay
- Perth South: Thomas Ballantyne
- Waterloo North: Moses Springer
- Waterloo South: John Fleming
- Wellington Centre: Charles Clarke
- Wellington South: Peter Gow
- Wellington West: John McGowan (Lib-Con)

Southwestern Ontario

- Elgin East: John Henry Wilson
- Elgin West: M.G. Munroe (Note: Election overturned on petition to the court. Thomas Hodgins (Liberal) was declared elected.)
- Essex North: James Colebrooke Patterson
- Essex South: Lewis Wigle
- Kent East: Archibald McKellar
- Kent West: Alexander Coutts
- Lambton East: Peter Graham
- Lambton West: Timothy Blair Pardee
- London: William Ralph Meredith
- Middlesex East: Richard Tooley
- Middlesex North: John McDougall
- Middlesex West: John Watterworth

Peel/York/Ontario

- Cardwell: John Flesher
- Ontario North: Thomas Paxton
- Ontario South: Nicholas W. Brown
- Peel: Kenneth Chisholm
- Toronto East: Matthew Crooks Cameron
- Toronto West: Robert Bell
- York East: John Lane
- York North: Joseph Henry Widdifield
- York West: Peter Patterson

=== Controverted elections ===
The following constituencies had elections which were declared void, for which writs of election were issued and elections held prior to the opening of the first session of the new Legislature:

New elections held upon previous results declared void
Voided result		Subsequent outcome	
District	Candidate	Date writ returned	Winner
Cornwall	Alexander Fraser McIntyre	September 20, 1875	John Goodall Snetsinger
Dundas	Andrew Broder	September 28, 1875	Reelected
Essex South	Lewis Wigle	September 24, 1875	Reelected
Grey North	Thomas Scott	November 3, 1875	David Creighton
Halton	William Barber	November 8, 1875	William Durie Lyon
Kent East	Archibald McKellar	September 22, 1875	Daniel McCraney
Monck	Henry Ryan Haney	June 28, 1875	Reelected
Northumberland East	James Marshall Ferris	November 18, 1875	Reelected
Ontario North	Thomas Paxton	October 30, 1875	Reelected
Oxford South	Adam Oliver	September 14, 1875	Adam Crooks (Note: formerly MLA for Toronto West)
Peterborough East	John C. O'Sullivan	September 28, 1875	Reelected
Peterborough West	George Albertus Cox	October 30, 1875	William Hepburn Scott
Russell	Adam Jacob Baker	August 21, 1875	Reelected
Simcoe South	D'Arcy Edward Boulton	June 3, 1875	William McDougall
Victoria North	John David Smith	September 29, 1875	Duncan McRae
Welland	James George Currie	July 8, 1875	Reelected
Wellington West	John McGowan	October 4, 1875	Reelected
Wentworth North	Thomas Stock	November 3, 1875	James McMahon

== See also ==
- Politics of Ontario
- List of Ontario political parties
- Premier of Ontario
- Leader of the Opposition (Ontario)
