= Durham East (federal electoral district) =

Former federal electoral district in Ontario, Canada

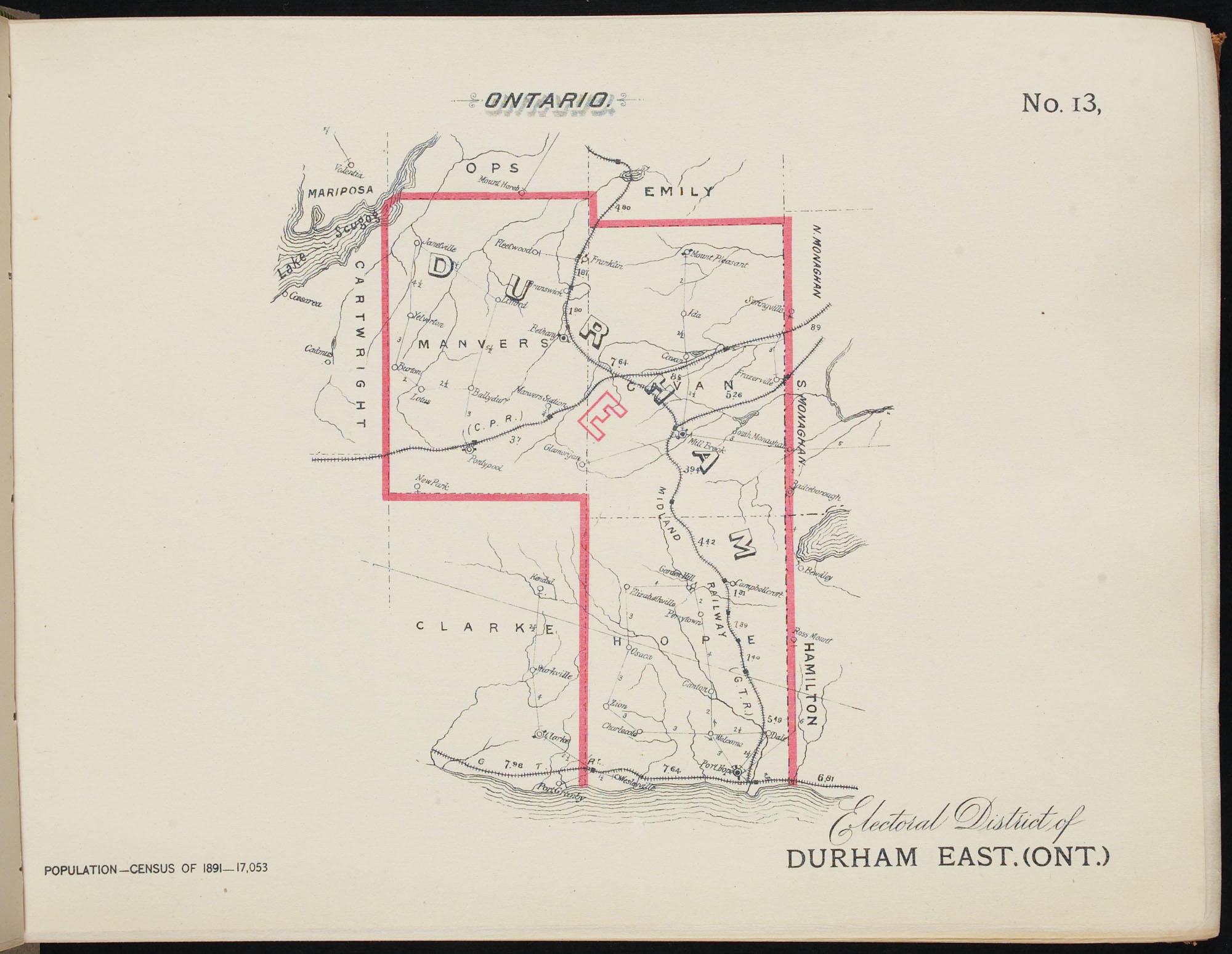
Map of the Durham East riding, c. 1895

Durham East was a federal electoral district represented in the House of Commons of Canada from 6 August 1867 to 19 September 1904. It was located in the province of Ontario. It was created by the British North America Act 1867 which divided the county of Durham into two ridings: Durham West and Durham East.

The East Riding of Durham was abolished in 1903 when it was merged into Durham riding.

== Election results ==
1867 Canadian federal election
Party	Candidate	Votes
Conservative	Francis H. Burton	1,134
Unknown	F. Beamish	451

1872 Canadian federal election
Party	Candidate	Votes
Liberal	Lewis Ross	1,357
Unknown	Mr. Kirchhoffer	1,117

1874 Canadian federal election
Party	Candidate	Votes
Liberal	Lewis Ross	1,373
Unknown	Mr. Beamish	722

1878 Canadian federal election
Party	Candidate	Votes
Conservative	Arthur Trefusis Heneage Williams	1,717
Liberal	Lewis Ross	1,317

1882 Canadian federal election
Party	Candidate	Votes
Conservative	WILLIAMS, Arthur T.H.	1,638
Liberal	ROSS, Lewis	1,257

On Mr. Williams' death, 4 July 1885:

By-election on 24 August 1885
Party	Candidate	Votes
Conservative	WARD, Henry Alfred	acclaimed

1887 Canadian federal election
Party	Candidate	Votes
Conservative	WARD, Henry Alfred	1,667
Independent Liberal	FALLIS, John	1,275

1891 Canadian federal election
Party	Candidate	Votes
Conservative	CRAIG, Thomas Dixon	1,746
Equal Rights	GRANDY, Samuel	1,685

1896 Canadian federal election
Party	Candidate	Votes
Conservative	CRAIG, Thomas Dixon	1,767
McCarthyite	MCCLEAN, Milliam	1,598

1900 Canadian federal election
Party	Candidate	Votes
Conservative	WARD, Henry Alfred	1,661
Liberal	POWERS, Dr. L.B.	1,450

== See also ==
- List of Canadian electoral districts
- Historical federal electoral districts of Canada
