= 1st Parliament of Ontario =

- Coalition parliament
- Sep. 3, 1867 – Feb. 25, 1871

Parliament leaders
- Premier: John Sandfield Macdonald

Party caucuses
- Government: Conservative Party
- Opposition: Liberal Party
- * Coalition government

Legislative Assembly
- Speaker of the Assembly: John Stevenson
→ 2nd

The 1st Parliament of Ontario was the inaugural legislature of the Province of Ontario following Canadian Confederation. Its composition was determined by the 1867 Ontario general election held in conjunction with the first Canadian federal election over several weeks in August and September. It was in session from December 27, 1867, until February 25, 1871, just prior to the 1871 general election.

This parliament along with the 1st Quebec Legislature and the 1st Canadian Parliament were joint successor-legislatures of the 8th Parliament of the Province of Canada, the final composition of the Legislative Assembly of the Province of Canada.

John Stevenson served as speaker for the assembly.

== Composition ==
On the surface, the 1867 general election produced a virtual tie between the Conservative Party led by John Sandfield Macdonald and the Liberal Party led informally by Archibald McKellar.

Elections to the 1st Parliament of Ontario (1867)
Political party	Party leader	Candidates	Seats	Votes	
Political party	Party leader	Candidates	Seats	#	%
Conservative	John Sandfield Macdonald	78	41	80,111	50.28%
Liberal	Archibald McKellar	80	41	77,689	48.76%
Independent		15	–	1,523	0.96%
Total		173	82	159,323	100.00%
Registered electors				215,722	
Acclamations		█ Conservative		2	
Acclamations		█ Liberal		4	

The partisan make up of the legislature was not as straight forward as the numbers suggest. Political parties in the early days of confederation were characterized by "loose coalitions" that may change from issue to issue. The party labels on official record for those early elections were retroactively applied after partisan political system was more formalized, and thus were not all accurate. For example, Edmund Burke Wood, Ontario's inaugural Treasurer who was also elected to the federal parliament, was recorded as elected to the Ontario legislature as a conservative (likely because he served in the Sandfield Macdonald ministry) and to the House of Commons as a Liberal (likely because he returned to the Liberal fold in 1873 and was later appointed by Liberal prime minister Alexander McKenzie to be chief justice of Manitoba). In 1867 however, he was explicitly repudiated by the South Brant Liberal association, was elected to both seat as a coalitionist, and his opponent for the federal seat, Henry Blakey Leeming was none other than the local Liberal association president.

=== Dual mandate ===
In the first several years of Confederation, individuals could hold seats in federal and provincial parliaments simultaneously. The following men were elected to both the House of Commons and the Ontario legislature in 1867:

- Edward Blake, elected MP for Durham West and MLA for Bruce South, later Premier of Ontario and federal Liberal leader
- John Carling, elected MP and MLA for London, a key lieutenant of Sir John A Macdonald and later a member of his federal cabinet
- Thomas Roberts Ferguson, elected MP for Cardwell and MLA for Simcoe South
- John Sandfield MacDonald, elected MP and MLA for Cornwall, Ontario's first Premier
- Edmund Burke Wood, elected MP and MLA for Brant South, Ontario's first Treasurer in the Macdonald ministry

Two further members were elected to the federal parliament during this parliament:

- John Lorn McDougall, MLA for Renfrew South, was elected MP for the same electoral district in a 1869 by-election
- Frederick William Cumberland, MLA for Algoma, was elected MP for the same electoral district in a 1871 by-election

== Sessions ==
There were four sessions in duration of the first Ontario Parliament:

- 1st session - December 27, 1867 to March 4, 1868
- 2nd session - November 3, 1868 to January 23, 1869
- 3rd session - November 3 to December 24, 1869
- 4th session - December 7, 1870 to February 15, 1871

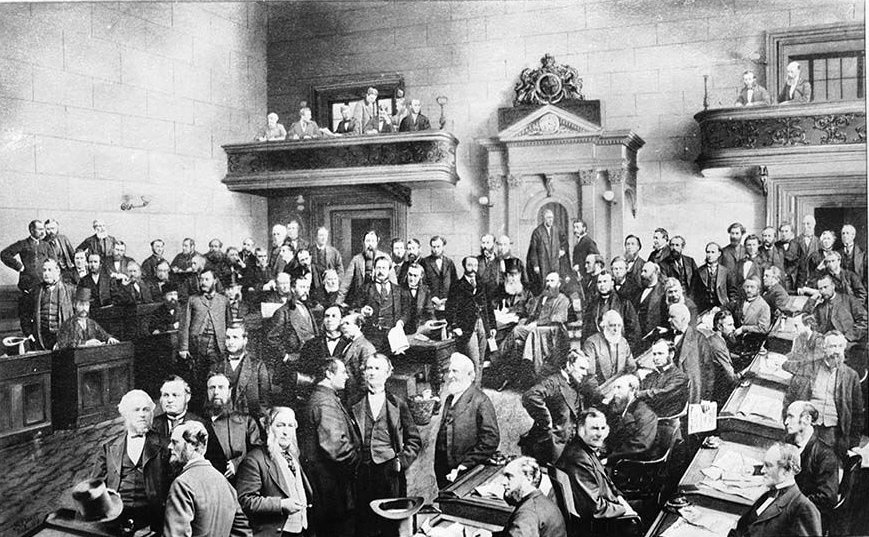
Parliament of Ontario 1871. A composite of the members of the First Parliament toward the end of its term. For a key of this composite, see Key to 1871 Ontario Parliament Composite.

== List of Members ==
‡ Concurrently an MP. Names in bold indicate member of cabinet (Sandfield Macdonald ministry)

Electoral District	Member	Party (Note: Partisan affiliations per records compiled by the Legislative Library of Ontario in later years)	First elected	No. of terms	Note
Addington	Edmund John Glyn Hooper	Conservative	1867	1st term	
Algoma	Frederick William Cumberland ‡	Conservative	1867	1st term	Concurrently MP from 1871
Bothwell	Archibald McKellar	Liberal	1867	1st term	Leader of the Opposition, 1867–1870
Brant North	Hugh Finlayson	Liberal	1867	1st term	
Brant South	**Hon.** **Edmund Burke Wood ‡**	Conservative	1867	1st term	Treasurer in Sandfield Macdonald ministry
Brockville and Elizabethtown	William Fitzsimmons	Conservative	1867	1st term	
Bruce North	Donald Sinclair	Liberal	1867	1st term	
Bruce South	Edward Blake ‡	Liberal	1867	1st term	Leader of the Opposition, 1870–1872; Concurrently MP for Durham West
Cardwell	Thomas Swinarton	Conservative	1867	1st term	
Carleton	Robert Lyon	Liberal	1867	1st term	
Cornwall	**Hon.** **John Sandfield Macdonald ‡**	Liberal-Conservative	1867	1st term	Premier and Attorney General in Sandfield Macdonald Ministry Before confederation: Solicitor General for Canada West 1849–51), Speaker 1852–53; Joint-premier 1862–64
Dundas	Simon S. Cook	Liberal	1867	1st term	
Durham East	Arthur Trefusis Heneage Williams	Conservative	1867	1st term	
Durham West	John McLeod	Liberal	1867	1st term	
Elgin East	Daniel Luton	Conservative	1867	1st term	
Elgin West	Nicol McColl	Conservative	1867	1st term	
Essex	Solomon Wigle	Conservative	1867	1st term	
Frontenac	**Hon. Sir** Henry Smith (Note: Entitled to the honorific by nature of having been a cabinet minister (Solicitor General) of the United Province of Canada.)	Conservative	1867	1st term	Died September 18, 1868; Before confederation: Solicitor General for Canada West 1854–58, Speaker of the Legislative Assembly 1858–61
Frontenac	Delino Dexter Calvin (1868)	Conservative	1868	1st term	Elected October 19, 1868
Glengarry	James Craig	Conservative	1867	1st term	
Grenville South	Mcneil Clarke	Conservative	1867	1st term	
Grey North	Thomas Scott	Conservative	1867	1st term	
Grey South	Abram William Lauder	Conservative	1867	1st term	
Haldimand	Jacob Baxter	Liberal	1867	1st term	
Halton	William Barber	Liberal	1867	1st term	
Hamilton	James Miller Williams	Liberal	1867	1st term	
Hastings East	Henry Corby	Conservative	1867	1st term	
Hastings North	George Henry Boulter	Conservative	1867	1st term	
Hastings West	Ketchum Graham	Conservative	1867	1st term	
Huron North	William Torrance Hays	Conservative	1867	1st term	
Huron South	Robert Gibbons	Liberal	1867	1st term	Unseated on December 9, 1868 (Note: Gibbons defeated Carling in the election by 10 votes. Carling challenged the election results, and the matter was tried by a special committee consist of five members, which concluded Carling would have had a majority of the votes of those voted unlawfully were discounted. The committee reported its finding to the house on December 9, the clerk proceed strike Gibbons' name out and replaced it with Carling's on December 10, and Carling was sworn in and seated on December 14. No by-election was held.)
Huron South	Isaac Carling (1868)	Conservative	1868	1st term	From December 14, 1868 - sworn in and seated (Note: As reported in this day's journal of the legislature, "Mr. Carling (South Huron), having previously taken the oath and signed the roll, took his seat.")
Kent	John Smith	Liberal	1867	1st term	
Kingston	Maxwell W. Strange	Conservative	1867	1st term	
Lambton	Timothy Blair Pardee	Liberal	1867	1st term	
Lanark North	Daniel Galbraith	Liberal	1867	1st term	
Lanark South	William McNairn Shaw	Conservative	1867	1st term	Died January 6, 1869
Lanark South	Abraham Code (1869)	Conservative	1869	1st term	Elected February 3/4, 1869
Leed North and Grenville North	Henry Dolphus Smith	Liberal	1867	1st term	
Leeds South	Benjamin Tett	Conservative	1867	1st term	
Lennox	Hon. John Stevenson	Conservative	1867	1st term	Speaker
Lincoln	John Charles Rykert	Conservative	1867	1st term	
London	**Hon.** **John Carling ‡**	Conservative	1867	1st term	Commissioner of Agriculture and Public Works in Sandfield Macdonald ministry
Middlesex East	James Evans	Liberal	1867	1st term	
Middlesex North	James Sinclair Smith	Liberal	1867	1st term	
Middlesex West	Nathaniel Currie	Conservative	1867	1st term	
Monck	George Secord	Conservative	1867	1st term	
Niagara	Donald Robertson	Conservative	1867	1st term	Did not take seat. (Note: Resigned prior to the convening of legislature to make room for cabinet member Stephen Richards who failed to win his own seat in the general election. Resignation formally entered into the record on the first day of the first session.)
Niagara	**Hon.** **Stephen Richards** (1867)	Conservative	1867	1st term	Elected in by-election on December 11, 1867 ; (Note: Sworn in on the same day with other members upon the convening of legislature); Commissioner of Crown Lands in Sandfield Macdonald ministry
Norfolk North	James Wilson	Conservative	1867	1st term	
Norfolk South	Simpson McCall	Liberal	1867	1st term	
Northumberland East	John Eyre	Liberal	1867	1st term	
Northumberland West	Alexander Fraser	Liberal	1867	1st term	
Ontario North	Thomas Paxton	Liberal	1867	1st term	
Ontario South	William McGill	Liberal	1867	1st term	
Ottawa	Richard William Scott	Liberal	1867	1st term	
Oxford North	George Perry	Liberal	1867	1st term	
Oxford South	Adam Oliver	Liberal	1867	1st term	
Peel	John Coyne	Conservative	1867	1st term	
Perth North	Andrew Monteith	Conservative	1867	1st term	
Perth South	James Trow	Liberal	1867	1st term	
Peterborough East	George Read	Conservative	1867	1st term	
Peterborough West	John Carnegie	Conservative	1867	1st term	
Prescott	James P. Boyd	Liberal	1867	1st term	
Prince Edward	Absalom Greeley	Liberal	1867	1st term	resigned December 7, 1870
Prince Edward	William Anderson (1870)	Conservative	1870	1st term	elected June 29, 1870
Renfrew North	John Supple	Conservative	1867	1st term	resigned October 22, 1869
Renfrew North	Thomas Murray (1869)	Conservative	1869	1st term	elected December 1, 1869
Renfrew South	John Lorn McDougall	Liberal	1867	1st term	From 1869, concurrently MP for Renfrew South
Russell	William Craig	Conservative	1867	1st term	
Simcoe North	William Lount	Liberal	1867	1st term	
Simcoe South	Thomas Ferguson ‡	Conservative	1867	1st term	
Stormont	William Colquhoun	Conservative	1867	1st term	
Toronto East	**Hon.** **Matthew Crooks Cameron**	Conservative	1867	1st term	Provincial Secretary and Registrar in Sandfield Macdonald ministry
Toronto West	John Wallis	Conservative	1867	1st term	
Victoria North	Alexander Peter Cockburn	Liberal	1867	1st term	
Victoria South	Thomas Matchett	Liberal	1867	1st term	
Waterloo North	Moses Springer	Liberal	1867	1st term	
Waterloo South	Isaac Clemens	Liberal	1867	1st term	
Welland	William Beatty	Liberal	1867	1st term	
Wellington Centre	Alexander David Ferrier	Conservative	1867	1st term	
Wellington North	Robert McKim	Liberal	1867	1st term	
Wellington South	Peter Gow	Liberal	1867	1st term	
Wentworth North	Robert Christie	Liberal	1867	1st term	
Wentworth South	William Sexton	Liberal	1867	1st term	
York East	Hugh Powell Crosby	Liberal	1867	1st term	
York North	Hon. John McMurrich (Note: Entitled to the honorific by nature of having been a Legislative Councillor of the United Province of Canada.)	Liberal	1867	1st term	
York West	Thomas Grahame	Conservative	1867	1st term	

== Changes to composition ==
The make up of the first parliament was fairly stable, with only a few changes.

Electoral District	Departed Member			New Member	
Electoral District	Member	Vacated	Reason	Member	Elected
Niagara	Donald Robertson	December 27, 1867 (Note: Date the house was informed. Resignation took place earlier while house was not in session)	Resignation before taking seat	Stephen Richards	December 11, 1867
Frontenac	Hon. Sir Henry Smith	September 18, 1868	Death	Delino Dexter Calvin	October 19, 1868
Huron South	Robert Gibbons	December 9, 1868	Election overturned	Isaac Carling	December 14, 1868
Lanark South	William McNairn Shaw	January 6, 1869	Death	Abraham Code	February 6, 1869
Renfrew North	John Supple	October 22, 1869	Resignation	Thomas Murray	December 1, 1869
Prince Edward	Absalom Greeley	December 7, 1870	Resignation (acceptance of office of emolument from Crown)	William Anderson	June 30, 1870
