= Stephen Richards (politician) =

Canadian politician

The Honourable Stephen Richards
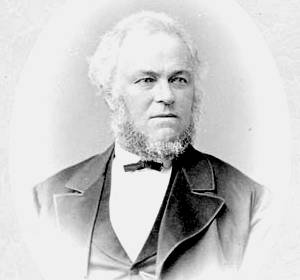
- Portrait from 1873

MPP of the Legislative Assembly of Ontario
- In office December 11, 1867 – December 23, 1874
- Preceded by: Donald Robertson
- Constituency: Niagara

Personal details
- Born: 19 May 1820 Brockville, Upper Canada
- Died: 4 October 1894 (aged 74) Toronto, Ontario, Canada
- Party: Liberal Party (pre-1867); Conservative Party (1867-1894)
- Relations: William Buell Richards (brother); Albert Norton Richards (brother)

Stephen Richards (May 19, 1820 – October 4, 1894) was a lawyer and political figure of Ontario, Canada. He represented Niagara in the Legislative Assembly of Ontario as a Conservative member from 1867 to 1874.

== Career ==
He was educated in Toronto and was called to the bar in 1844. In 1858, he was named Queen's Counsel.

He first tried to run for office in the first Ontario provincial election for the Leeds South riding, but lost by just 7 votes. He was eventually elected to the provincial legislature in an 1867 by-election after the sitting member Donald Robertson resigned. He served as Commissioner of Crown Lands in the Executive Council of the province from 1867 to 1871 and provincial secretary in 1871.

== Personal life ==
Born to Stephen Richards Sr. and Phoebe Buell, in Brockville, Upper Canada, on 19 May 1820. He had two brothers, William Buell Richards, who was the first Chief Justice of Canada and Albert Norton Richards, who was a member of the Canadian House of Commons and Lieutenant-Governor of British Columbia. His grandfather William Buell and uncle William Buell Jr. both served in the Parliament of Upper Canada.

He died in Toronto on October 11, 1894 of unknown causes.

== Electoral history ==
1867 Ontario general election: Leeds South
Party	Candidate	Votes	%
Conservative	Benjamin Tett	1,380	50.13
Liberal	Stephen Richards	1,373	49.87
Total valid votes		2,753	83.96
Eligible voters		3,279	
Conservative pickup new district.			
Source: Elections Ontario

Ontario provincial by-election, December 1867: Niagara Resignation of Donald Robertson
Party	Candidate	Votes	%	±%
Conservative	Stephen Richards	229	99.13	+44.82
Independent	Mr. Geale	2	0.87	
Total valid votes		231	100.0	−58.45
Conservative hold		Swing		+44.82
Source: History of the Electoral Districts, Legislatures and Ministries of the Province of Ontario

1871 Ontario general election: Niagara
Party	Candidate	Votes	%	±%
Conservative	Stephen Richards	277	62.25	−36.88
Liberal	Mr. Ball	168	37.75	
Turnout		445	56.98	+92.64
Eligible voters		781		
Conservative hold		Swing		−36.88
Source: Elections Ontario
