= John Carew (disambiguation) =

John Carew (born 1979) is a Norwegian former footballer

John Carew may also refer to:

- John Carew (Canadian politician) (1862–1927), lumber merchant and politician in Ontario, Canada
- John Carew (Irish politician) (1901–1968), Irish Fine Gael politician
- John Carew (regicide) (1622–1660), one of the regicides of King Charles I
- John Carew (sprinter) (born 1952), sprint runner from Sierra Leone
- John Edward Carew (1785–1868), Irish-born British sculptor
- John F. Carew (1873–1951), U.S. Representative from New York
- Sir John Carew, 3rd Baronet (1635–1692), English politician
- John Carew (MP died 1545), MP for Poole (UK Parliament constituency)

== See also ==
- John Carew Eccles (1903–1997), Australian neurophysiologist
- John Carew Rolfe (1859–1943), American classical scholar
- Carew baronets
- Carew (surname)
