= Thomas Stinson (disambiguation) =

- Thomas Stinson (1798–1864) was a Canadian merchant, banker, and landowner from Hamilton, Ontario.

Thomas Stinson may also refer to:

- Thomas Henry Stinson, Canadian politician, elected to Legislative Assembly of Ontario representing Hamilton
- Thomas Hubert Stinson (1883–1965), Canadian barrister and member of the House of Commons of Canada representing Victoria, Ontario
- Tommy Stinson (Thomas Eugene Stinson, born 1966), American rock musician best known as the bass guitarist for The Replacements
