= George McManus (politician) =

Canadian politician

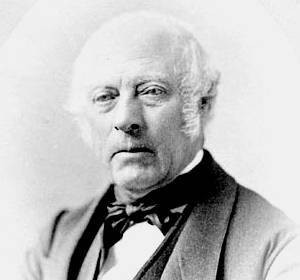

Ontario MPP
- In office 1871–1874
- Preceded by: Thomas Swinarton
- Succeeded by: John Flesher
- Constituency: Cardwell

Personal details
- Born: 1806 Mountnugent, Kilbride Parish, County Cavan, Ireland
- Died: October 18, 1887 (aged 81) Mono, Ontario
- Party: Liberal-Conservative Party
- Spouses: Anne Carson (m. 1831; died 1865) Alice Ann Kells (m. 1866; died 1923)
- Occupation: Justice of the Peace

George John McManus (1806 – October 18, 1887) was an Ontario political figure. He represented Cardwell in the Legislative Assembly of Ontario as a Liberal-Conservative Party Member of Provincial Parliament from 1871 to 1874.

McManus was born in Mountnugent, Kilbride Parish, County Cavan, Ireland, grew up there and settled in Mono Township in the summer of 1829. He was reeve for the township (1851-1873) and served as warden for Simcoe County in 1859. McManus was named superintendent of schools in 1844 and also served as justice of the peace (appointed clerk, Simcoe Co. 8th Division Court, 1848) and a lieutenant-colonel in the local militia. In 1831, he married Anne Carson (9 children) and later married Alice Ann Kells (0 children) in 1866 after Anne's death.

== Electoral history ==
1867 Ontario general election: Cardwell
Party	Candidate	Votes	%
Conservative	Thomas Swinarton	1,151	52.37
Liberal	George McManus	1,047	47.63
Total valid votes		2,198	84.96
Eligible voters		2,587	
Conservative pickup new district.			
Source: Elections Ontario

1871 Ontario general election: Cardwell
Party	Candidate	Votes	%	±%
Liberal–Conservative	George McManus	1,116	63.16	
Liberal	Mr. Cumberland	651	36.84	−10.79
Turnout		1,767	67.14	−17.82
Eligible voters		2,632		
Liberal–Conservative gain from Conservative		Swing		+5.40
Source: Elections Ontario
