= William Buell Richards =

Chief Justice of Canada from 1875 to 1879

The Honourable Sir William Buell Richards PC
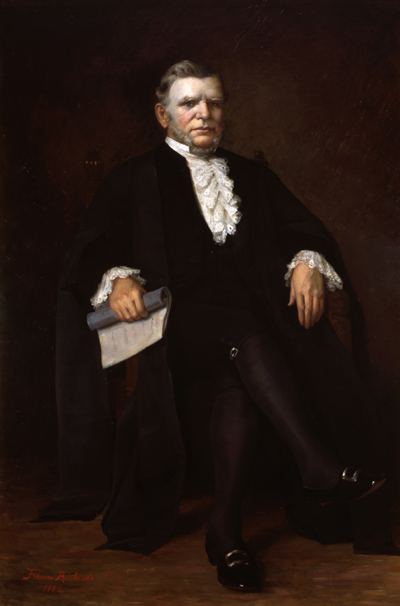
- The Honourable Sir William Buell Richards, portrait by his niece Frances Richards

1st Chief Justice of Canada
- In office September 30, 1875 – January 10, 1879
- Nominated by: Alexander Mackenzie
- Succeeded by: William Johnstone Ritchie

1st Chief Justice of Ontario
- In office November 6, 1868 – September 29, 1875
- Succeeded by: Robert Alexander Harrison

Member of the Legislative Assembly of the Province of Canada for Leeds
- In office 1848–1853
- Preceded by: Ogle Robert Gowan
- Succeeded by: Jesse Delong

Personal details
- Born: May 2, 1815 Brockville, Upper Canada
- Died: January 26, 1889 (aged 73) Ottawa, Ontario, Canada
- Party: Reformer
- Spouse: Deborah Catherine Muirhead (m. 1846)
- Relations: William Buell, uncle Stephen Richards, brother Albert Norton Richards, brother
- Children: 5
- Education: St. Lawrence Academy

Sir William Buell Richards PC (May 2, 1815 – January 26, 1889) was a Canadian lawyer, politician, and judge, and served as the first Chief Justice of Canada.

Under Richards' leadership, the Supreme Court was marked by controversy surrounding its creation, concerns about the conduct of its justices, the length and lack of clarity in its decisions, and significant delays in the publication of those decisions.

== Early life ==
Richards was born in Brockville, Upper Canada, to Stephen Richards and Phoebe Buell, the eldest of three children. His younger brother Stephen Richards represented Niagara in the Legislative Assembly of Ontario as a Conservative member from 1867 to 1874. The youngest brother Albert Norton Richards represented Leeds South in the House of Commons of Canada as a Liberal member from 1872 to 1874; and served as the second Lieutenant Governor of British Columbia from 1876 to 1881.

Richards was the maternal grand-son of William Buell, a politician and judge in Upper Canada.

He earned law degree at the St. Lawrence Academy in Potsdam, New York and then articled with his uncle Andrew Norton Buell in Brockville. He was called to the bar in 1837 and continued to practice in Brockville with George Malloch until 1853 and then with his uncle again.

== Legal career ==
In 1848 Richards was elected to the Legislative Assembly of the Province of Canada for the riding of Leeds as a Reformer, and by 1851 he became the Attorney General for Canada West, a position he held until 1853.

Leaving politics in June 1853, he was appointed to the Court of Common Pleas of Canada West and became Chief Justice on July 22, 1863.

On November 6, 1868, Richards was appointed to Chief Justice of the Ontario Court of Queen's Bench, the highest court in Ontario at that time, the Supreme Court not yet having been created. It was during this time that he heard the appeal of Patrick James Whelan for the murder of Thomas D'Arcy McGee. During his time on the Ontario bench, Richards was praised for his "powerful intellect", common sense, his ability to take a broad view of legal issues, and his view of the judicial function.

=== Chief Justice of Canada ===
In 1875, the Supreme Court of Canada was created by an Act of Parliament, and Prime Minister Alexander Mackenzie appointed Richards the first Chief Justice of Canada. On October 8, 1875, General William O'Grady Haly administered the oath of office to Chief Justice Richards. A month later on November 8, the five puisne justices—William Johnstone Ritchie, Samuel Henry Strong, Jean-Thomas Taschereau, Télesphore Fournier, William Alexander Henry—were sworn in.

Richards was seen as a qualified candidate despite his poor health. With his appointment at the age of 60, he had spent 22 years as a judge, two years as attorney general, and was a personal friend from Prime Minister Mackenzie and John A. Macdonald. Richards appointment was praised by the Toronto newspaper The Globe.

At the time, the justices of the court did not see a familial relationship with a party or lawyer as a reason not to hear a case, and Richards sat in Gray v Richford in 1878, despite his brother Stephen Richards serving as counsel on the case.

During Richards' term, the Supreme Court was criticized for its high cost, isolation in Ottawa, the considerable travel of its justices, its slowness for rendering decisions, and criticism of individual cases. Richards health began to fail, and in Fall 1878 he travelled to Europe for treatment. Richards was out of the country when Jean-Thomas Taschereau resigned from the court, and because the Chief Justice was required to swear in new justices, the Supreme Court was left without quorum. In January 1879, Richards resigned as Chief Justice following pressure from his longtime friend, Prime Minister John A. Macdonald, likely due to his deteriorating health. On January 11, 1879, Richards was replaced as Chief Justice by William Johnstone Ritchie.

Snell and Vaughn note that Richards' tenure as Chief Justice fell short of expectations and failed to meet the needs of the newly established Court. He struggled to assert control over the Court and to balance the diverse personalities and abilities of the other justices, though some of his shortcomings could be attributed to his poor health. Biographer Ian MacPherson notes that Richards had many of the qualities necessary for a good Chief Justice, particularly his wide scope when viewing issues and decisions using broad principles of law.

== Later life ==
He was honoured with a knighthood, along with then Chief Justice of Quebec Antoine Aime Dorion. The honours were announced formally on October 5, 1877.

Richards died on January 26, 1889, in Ottawa.

== Family life ==
On October 19, 1846, Richards married Deborah Catherine Muirhead (1825–1869) and had three sons and two daughters.

His niece Frances Richards painted his official portrait.

== See also ==
- William Buell
- William Buell Jr.

Preceded by Robert Baldwin	Attorney General of Canada West; 1848–1854	Succeeded by John Alexander Macdonald
