= Wellington East (Canadian electoral district) =

Former provincial electoral district in Ontario, Canada

Wellington Centre
Ontario electoral district

Defunct provincial electoral district
- Legislature: Legislative Assembly of Ontario
- District created: 1867
- District abolished: 1925
- First contested: 1867
- Last contested: 1923

Wellington East was a provincial electoral district in Ontario, Canada. From 1886 to 1926 it elected members to the Legislative Assembly of Ontario.

== Members of the Legislative Assembly ==
Wellington East
Assembly	Years	Member	Party
Wellington Centre
1st	1867–1871	Alexander David Ferrier	Conservative
2nd	1871–1874	Charles Clarke	Liberal
3rd	1875–1879	Charles Clarke	Liberal
4th	1879–1883	Charles Clarke	Liberal
5th	1883–1886	Charles Clarke	Liberal
Wellington East
6th	1886–1890	Charles Clarke	Liberal
7th	1890–1891	Charles Clarke	Liberal
7th	1891–1894	James Kirkwood	Liberal
8th	1894–1898	John Craig	Liberal
9th	1898–1898	John Craig	Liberal
9th	1899–1902	John Morison Gibson	Liberal
10th	1902–1904	John Morison Gibson	Liberal
11th	1904–1908	James J. Craig	Conservative
12th	1908–1911	James J. Craig	Conservative
13th	1911–1914	Udney Richardson	Liberal
14th	1914–1919	Udney Richardson	Liberal
15th	1919–1920	Albert Hellyer	United Farmers
15th	1920–1923	William Raney	United Farmers
16th	1923–1926	William Raney	United Farmers
Sourced from the Ontario Legislative Assembly
Merged into Wellington Northeast before the 1926 election

== Election results ==
1867 Ontario general election
Party	Candidate	Votes	%
Conservative	Alexander David Ferrier	1,106	44.36
Liberal	J.S. Armstrong	1,048	42.04
Independent	J. Loghrin	339	13.60
Total valid votes		2,493	79.24
Eligible voters		3,146	
Conservative pickup new district.			
Source: Elections Ontario

1871 Ontario general election
Party	Candidate	Votes	%	±%
Liberal	Charles Clarke	1,465	64.94	+22.90
Conservative	Mr. McLaren	791	35.06	−9.30
Turnout		2,256	58.89	−20.35
Eligible voters		3,831		
Liberal gain from Conservative		Swing		+16.10
Source: Elections Ontario

1875 Ontario general election
Party	Candidate	Votes
Liberal	Charles Clarke	Acclaimed
Source: Elections Ontario

1879 Ontario general election
Party	Candidate	Votes	%
Liberal	Charles Clarke	1,405	65.35
Conservative	Mr. Roberts	745	34.65
Total valid votes		2,150	50.05
Eligible voters		4,296	
Liberal hold			
Source: Elections Ontario

== See also ==
- List of Ontario provincial electoral districts
- Canadian provincial electoral districts
