= Charles Clarke (Canadian politician) =

Canadian politician (1826–1909)

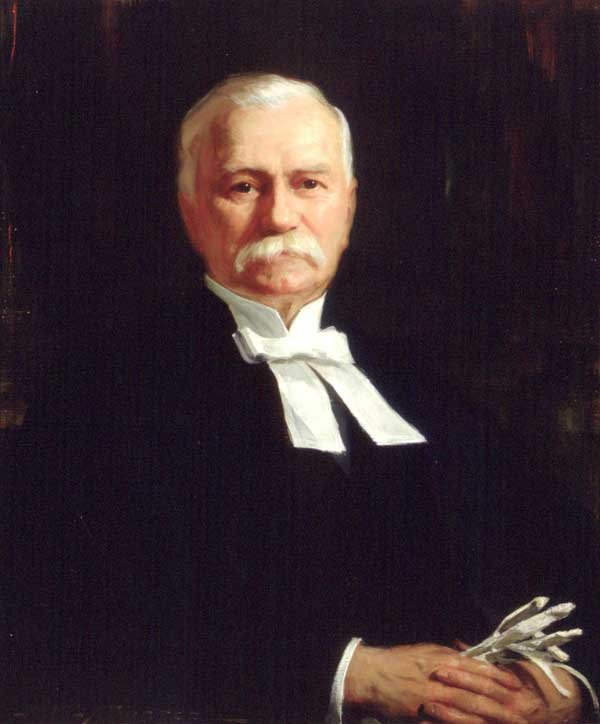

Ontario MPP
- In office 1886–1891
- Preceded by: New riding
- Succeeded by: James Kirkwood
- Constituency: Wellington East
- In office 1871–1886
- Preceded by: Alexander David Ferrier
- Succeeded by: Riding abolished
- Constituency: Wellington Centre

Personal details
- Born: November 28, 1826 Lincoln, England
- Died: April 6, 1909 (aged 82) Elora, Ontario
- Party: Liberal
- Occupation: Businessman

Charles Clarke (November 28, 1826 – April 6, 1909) was speaker of the Legislature of Ontario in 1880-1883 and served as Liberal MLA for Wellington Centre from 1871 to 1886 and for Wellington East from 1886 to 1891.

He was born in Lincoln, England, in 1826, studied there with George Boole, was apprenticed as a draper and came to Canada West in 1844. He joined his mother and stepfather on a farm in the Niagara District and later moved with them to Elora. He opened a store with his stepfather there. He was editor for the Journal and Express newspapers in Hamilton and helped establish the Elora Backwoodsman. He served on the town council for Elora and was reeve from 1859 to 1864 and from 1867 to 1868. He commanded a local militia unit during the Fenian raids, becoming lieutenant-colonel. In 1874, he helped introduce legislation that established the secret ballot for elections in the province. He became clerk of the legislature in January 1892 and served until 1907. He died in Elora in 1909.

== Electoral history ==
1871 Ontario general election: Wellington Centre
Party	Candidate	Votes	%	±%
Liberal	Charles Clarke	1,465	64.94	+22.90
Conservative	Mr. McLaren	791	35.06	−9.30
Turnout		2,256	58.89	−20.35
Eligible voters		3,831		
Liberal gain from Conservative		Swing		+16.10
Source: Elections Ontario

1875 Ontario general election: Wellington Centre
Party	Candidate	Votes
Liberal	Charles Clarke	Acclaimed
Source: Elections Ontario
