= James Kirkwood (politician) =

Canadian politician

Ontario MPP
- In office 1891–1894
- Preceded by: Charles Clarke
- Succeeded by: John Craig
- Constituency: Wellington East

Personal details
- Born: August 4, 1845 Erin, Canada West
- Died: July 15, 1933 (aged 87) Wellington, Ontario
- Party: Liberal
- Spouse: Agnes McDonald (m. 1871)
- Children: 6
- Occupation: Constable

James Kirkwood (August 8, 1845 – July 15, 1933) was a politician in Ontario, Canada. He represented Wellington East in the Legislative Assembly of Ontario from 1891 to 1894 as a Liberal.

The son of James Kirkwood and Agnes Davidson, he was born in Erin township. He served on the township council for twelve years, serving three years as reeve. From 1902 to 1905, Kirkwood served as police constable for East Nipissing. He served as secretary for both the Erin Agricultural Society and the East Wellington Farmer's Institute. Kirkwood was elected to the Ontario assembly in an 1891 by-election held after Charles Clarke resigned his seat.

In 1871, he married Agnes McDonald; the couple had six children.
