= James Haggerty (Canadian politician) =

Politician and farmer in Ontario, Canada

Ontario MPP
- In office 1894–1898
- Preceded by: Alpheus Field Wood
- Succeeded by: William John Allen
- Constituency: Hastings North

Personal details
- Born: March 11, 1833 Huntingdon Township, Upper Canada
- Died: March 20, 1912 (aged 79)
- Party: Patrons of Industry
- Spouse: Ann Fleming
- Occupation: Farmer

James Haggerty (March 11, 1833 – March 20, 1912) was an Ontario farmer and political figure. He represented Hastings North in the Legislative Assembly of Ontario from 1894 to 1898 as a Patrons of Industry member.

He was born in Huntingdon Township, Upper Canada, the son of James Haggerty who came to Upper Canada from Ireland, and was educated there and in Toronto. Haggerty was also a school teacher. He married Ann Fleming. He was president of the North Hastings Agricultural Society and was also president of the West Huntingdon Cheese Manufacturing Company. Haggerty served as reeve for Huntingdon in 1877, 1880–1882 and 1891 to 1894.
