= John Robert Cooke =

Canadian politician

Ontario MPP
- In office 1911–1934
- Preceded by: Josiah Williams Pearce
- Succeeded by: Riding abolished
- Constituency: Hastings North

Personal details
- Born: September 1, 1866 Rawdon, Canada West
- Died: August 14, 1934 (aged 67) Hamilton, Ontario
- Party: Conservative
- Spouse: Emma Wickens (m. 1888)
- Occupation: Hydro Commissioner

John Robert Cooke (September 1, 1866 – August 14, 1934) was a political figure in Ontario. He represented Hastings North in the Legislative Assembly of Ontario from 1911 to 1934 as a Conservative member.

He was born in Rawdon township in 1866, the son of James Cooke, and was educated there. In 1888, Cooke married Emma Wickens. He was named to the Ontario Hydro Electric Power Commission in 1923, and served as chairman of the commission from 1931 to 1934. Cooke served in the province's Executive Council as a minister without portfolio from 1923 to 1930

He died of injuries sustained after suffering a heart attack while driving and crashing in August 1934.
