= Hamilton (provincial electoral district) =

Former provincial electoral district in Ontario, Canada

Ontario electoral district

Defunct provincial electoral district
- Legislature: Legislative Assembly of Ontario
- District created: 1867
- District abolished: 1894
- First contested: 1867
- Last contested: 1890

Hamilton was an electoral riding in Ontario, Canada. It was created in 1867 at the time of confederation. In 1894 it was split into two ridings called Hamilton East and Hamilton West.

== Members of Provincial Parliament ==
Hamilton
Assembly	Years	Member	Party
1st	1867–1871	James Williams	Liberal
2nd	1871–1874	James Williams	Liberal
3rd	1875–1879	James Williams	Liberal
4th	1879–1883	John Gibson	Liberal
5th	1883–1886	John Gibson	Liberal
6th	1886–1890	John Gibson	Liberal
7th	1890–1891	Thomas Henry Stinson	Conservative
7th	1891–1894	John Gibson	Liberal
Sourced from the Ontario Legislative Assembly
Split into two ridings called Hamilton East and Hamilton West in 1894.

== Election results ==
Ontario provincial by-election, February 24, 1891 Void election
Party	Candidate	Votes	%	±%
Liberal	John Morison Gibson	4,386	54.17	+4.70
Conservative	Thomas Henry Stinson	3,710	45.83	–4.70
Total valid votes		8,096	100.00	
Total rejected ballots		–		
Turnout		8,096	–	–
Eligible voters				
Liberal gain from Conservative		Swing		+4.70
Source: Elections Ontario

1890 Ontario general election
Party	Candidate	Votes	%	±%
Conservative	Thomas Henry Stinson	4,111	50.53	–
Liberal	John Morison Gibson	4,025	49.47	–
Total valid votes		8,136	99.54	
Total rejected ballots		38	0.46	–
Turnout		8,174	78.54	–
Eligible voters		10,408		
Conservative gain from Liberal		Swing		–
Source: Elections Ontario

Ontario provincial by-election, January 31, 1889 Ministerial By-election
Party	Candidate	Votes
Liberal	John Morison Gibson	acclaimed
Source: Elections Ontario

1886 Ontario general election
Party	Candidate	Votes	%	±%
Liberal	John Morison Gibson	3,068	44.53	+4.75
Conservative	John Burns	2,633	38.22	+1.41
Labour	J. Hamilton Racey	1,188	17.24	–6.16
Total valid votes		6,889	99.11	
Total rejected ballots		62	0.89	+0.09
Turnout		6,951	63.12	+0.05
Eligible voters		11,013		
Liberal hold		Swing		+1.67
Source: Elections Ontario

1883 Ontario general election
Party	Candidate	Votes	%	±%
Liberal	John Morison Gibson	2,077	39.78	–10.92
Conservative	Mr. Martin	1,922	36.81	–12.49
Labour	Mr. Williams	1,222	23.41	–
Total valid votes		5,221	99.20	
Total rejected ballots		42	0.80	+0.80
Turnout		5,263	63.07	+4.00
Eligible voters		8,345		
Liberal hold		Swing		+0.78
Source: Elections Ontario

1879 Ontario general election
Party	Candidate	Votes	%
Liberal	John Morison Gibson	2,240	50.70
Conservative	Mr. Murray	2,178	49.30
Total valid votes		4,418	59.07
Eligible voters		7,479	
Liberal hold			
Source: Elections Ontario

1875 Ontario general election
Party	Candidate	Votes
Liberal	James Miller Williams	Acclaimed
Source: Elections Ontario

1871 Ontario general election
Party	Candidate	Votes	%	±%
Liberal	James Miller Williams	1,294	54.23	+0.35
Conservative	Mr. Brown	1,092	45.77	−0.35
Turnout		2,386	60.54	+2.31
Eligible voters		3,941		
Liberal hold		Swing		+0.35
Source: Elections Ontario

1867 Ontario general election
Party	Candidate	Votes	%
Liberal	James Miller Williams	1,193	53.88
Conservative	Mr. O'Reily	1,021	46.12
Total valid votes		2,214	58.23
Eligible voters		3,802	
Liberal pickup new district.			
Source: Elections Ontario
