= Edward Alfred Little =

Canadian politician

Edward Little

Ontario MPP
- In office 1896–1906
- Preceded by: William Henry Hammell
- Succeeded by: Alexander Ferguson
- Constituency: Cardwell

Personal details
- Born: April 9, 1859 Innisfil, Canada West
- Died: February 23, 1934 (aged 74) Toronto, Ontario
- Party: Protestant Protective Association, 1894-1898; Conservative, 1898-1906
- Occupation: Farmer

Edward Alfred Little (April 9, 1859 – February 23, 1934) was an Ontario farmer and political figure. He represented Cardwell in the Legislative Assembly of Ontario from 1894 to 1898 as a Conservative-Protestant Protective Association member and from 1898 to 1906 as a Conservative member.

He was born in Canada West, the son of William Carruthers Little, and educated in Barrie. He served as deputy reeve for Innisfil Township and was a school trustee. In 1906, he was appointed registrar for the Surrogate Court for Simcoe County.
