= Charles Robinson (Canadian politician) =

Canadian politician

Ontario MPP
- In office 1879–1883
- Preceded by: John Flesher
- Succeeded by: William Henry Hammell
- Constituency: Cardwell

Personal details
- Born: November 4, 1835 Chinguacousy Township, York County, Upper Canada
- Died: October 17, 1898 (aged 62) Peel County, Ontario
- Party: Liberal
- Spouse: Helen Standing (m. 1869)
- Occupation: Physician

Charles Robinson (November 4, 1835 – October 17, 1898) was an Ontario physician and political figure. He represented Cardwell in the Legislative Assembly of Ontario from 1879 to 1883 as a Liberal member.

He was born in Chinguacousy Township, York County, Upper Canada in 1835. His father was of English descent and his mother was Scottish. Robinson studied at the Toronto School of Medicine and the Jefferson Medical College. He set up practice in Claude in Peel County. In 1869, he married Helen Standing. Robinson served eight years as coroner.

== Electoral history ==
1879 Ontario general election: Cardwell
Party	Candidate	Votes	%	±%
Liberal	Charles Robinson	1,261	50.60	+3.40
Conservative	John Flesher	1,231	49.40	−3.40
Total valid votes		2,492	70.94	+4.11
Eligible voters		3,513		
Liberal gain from Conservative		Swing		+3.40
Source: Elections Ontario
