= Benjamin Tett =

Canadian politician

Benjamin Tett (February 14, 1798 – May 15, 1878) was an Ontario businessman and political figure. He represented Leeds South as a Conservative member of the 1st Parliament of Ontario.

He was born in Hinton St. George in England in 1798, the son of John Tett who manufactured cloth for ships' sails, and came to Perth, Upper Canada in 1820, later moving to Newboro. He served on the district council of the Johnstown District representing North Crosby. Around 1830, he set up a sawmill north of Kingston at Bedford Mills, anticipating the completion of the Rideau Canal. In partnership with the Chaffey family and others, he established a booming timber business in the area. He also constructed a gristmill and opened a general store. In 1833, he married Julianna Poole. Tett ran unsuccessfully in Leeds for a seat in the legislative assembly of Upper Canada in 1838. He was again unsuccessful when he ran for the South Leeds seat in the Legislative Assembly of the Province of Canada in 1854 but went on to represent South Leeds in the assembly from 1858 to 1863. In 1863, he was defeated by Albert Norton Richards for the same seat. Tett also served as a justice of the peace.

His daughter Elizabeth married doctor Robert Henry Preston, who later represented South Leeds in the provincial assembly. His great-grandson John Tett is the namesake of Kingston's Tett Centre for Creativity and Learning.

== Electoral history ==
1867 Ontario general election: Leeds South
Party	Candidate	Votes	%
Conservative	Benjamin Tett	1,380	50.13
Liberal	Stephen Richards	1,373	49.87
Total valid votes		2,753	83.96
Eligible voters		3,279	
Conservative pickup new district.			
Source: Elections Ontario
