= Thomas Henry Stinson =

Canadian politician

Member of the Ontario Provincial Parliament for Hamilton
- In office June 5, 1890 – February 23, 1891
- Preceded by: John Morison Gibson
- Succeeded by: John Morison Gibson

Personal details
- Party: Conservative

Thomas Henry Stinson was a Canadian politician from Ontario. He was elected to Legislative Assembly of Ontario in Hamilton at the 1890 Ontario general election but one year later he was unseated when his election declared void.

== See also ==
- 7th Parliament of Ontario
