= William Buell =

Canadian politician

William Buell (October 5, 1751 – August 8, 1832) was an American-born jurist, miller and political figure in Upper Canada.

He was born in Hebron, Connecticut in 1751, to Timothy Buell and Mercy Peters. He was descended from William Buell (1605-1681), who arrived from England in the 1630s. His father attempted to remain neutral during the American Revolution and was persecuted as a result. His son chose to side with the British and moved to Montreal at the beginning of the war. He served as assistant Quartermaster in General John Burgoyne's army. After the surrender at Saratoga, he joined the King's Rangers of Robert Rogers as an ensign and eventually rose to rank of Lieutenant.

In 1784, he settled in Elizabethtown Township then part of western Quebec near what was to become Brockville. He set up a mill in the area. In 1788, he was appointed justice of the peace in the Lunenburg District and in the Midland District in 1796. In 1800, he was elected to the 3rd Parliament of Upper Canada for Leeds. He opened the first school in Brockville in his own home and donated land for the courthouse and several churches. He helped his son, William Jr., buy and become editor of the Brockville Recorder; his son also represented Leeds in the Legislative Assembly (serving in the 10th to 12th Parliaments of Upper Canada).

He died of cholera in Brockville in 1832 during an epidemic.

== Family ==
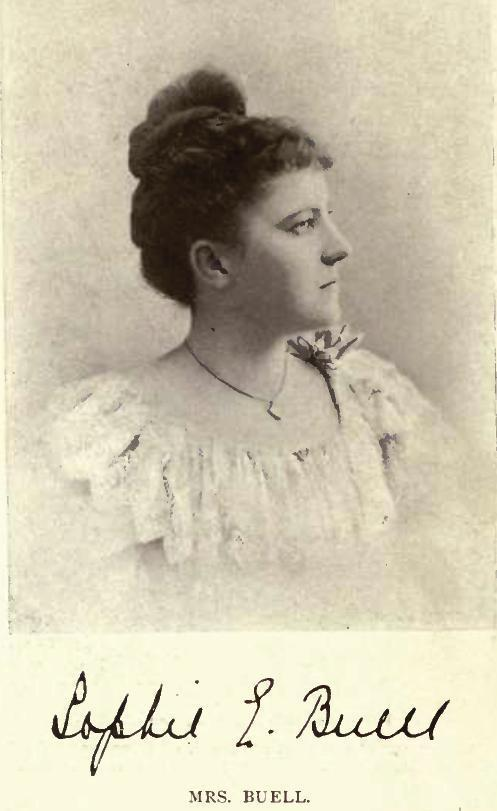
Mrs Sophia Elizabeth Buell née Bowie

William's great-grandson, William Senkler Buell, son of Jacob Dockstader Buell and Margaret Sophia Senkler, married Sophia Elizabeth Bowie, daughter of Robert Bowie, June 1, 1895. She was educated at the Convent of the Holy Names, Hochelaga, and at Miss Dupont's School, Toronto. As Mayor of Brockville, he and his wife received their Royal Highnesses the Duke and Duchess of Cornwall and York at Brockville, Ontario, October 15, 1901.

His grandson, William Buell Richards, became the first Chief Justice of the Supreme Court of Canada
