= William John Allen =

Canadian politician

Member of the Ontario Provincial Parliament for Hastings North
- In office March 1, 1898 – April 19, 1902
- Preceded by: James Haggerty
- Succeeded by: Josiah Williams Pearce

Personal details
- Party: Conservative

William John Allen was a Canadian politician from Ontario. He represented Hastings North in the Legislative Assembly of Ontario from 1898 to 1902.

== See also ==
- 9th Parliament of Ontario
