= Frederick George Sandy =

Canadian politician from Ontario

Member of the Ontario Provincial Parliament for Victoria South
- In office December 1, 1926 – September 17, 1929
- Preceded by: Robert John Patterson
- Succeeded by: Wellesley Wilson Staples
- In office October 20, 1919 – May 10, 1923
- Preceded by: John Carew
- Succeeded by: Robert John Patterson

Personal details
- Party: Liberal-Progressive (1926); United Farmers of Ontario (1919)

Frederick George Sandy was a Canadian politician from Ontario. He represented Victoria South in the Legislative Assembly of Ontario from 1919 to 1923, and 1926 to 1929.

== See also ==
- 15th Parliament of Ontario
- 17th Parliament of Ontario
