= Hastings North (provincial electoral district) =

Ontario electoral district

Defunct provincial electoral district
- Legislature: Legislative Assembly of Ontario
- District created: 1867
- District abolished: 1933
- First contested: 1867
- Last contested: 1929

Hastings North was an electoral riding in Ontario, Canada. It was created in 1867 at the time of confederation. It was abolished in 1933 before the 1934 election.

== Members of Provincial Parliament ==
Hastings North
Assembly	Years	Member	Party
1st	1867–1871	George Henry Boulter	Conservative
2nd	1871–1874	George Henry Boulter	Conservative
3rd	1875–1879	George Henry Boulter	Conservative
4th	1879–1883	George Henry Boulter	Conservative
5th	1883–1886	Alpheus Field Wood	Conservative
6th	1886–1890	Alpheus Field Wood	Conservative
7th	1890–1894	Alpheus Field Wood	Conservative
8th	1894–1898	James Haggerty	Patrons of Industry
9th	1898–1902	William John Allen	Conservative
10th	1902–1904	Josiah Williams Pearce	Conservative
11th	1905–1908	Josiah Williams Pearce	Conservative
12th	1908–1911	Josiah Williams Pearce	Conservative
13th	1911–1914	John Robert Cooke	Conservative
14th	1914–1919	John Robert Cooke	Conservative
15th	1919–1923	John Robert Cooke	Conservative
16th	1923–1926	John Robert Cooke	Conservative
17th	1926–1929	John Robert Cooke	Conservative
18th	1929–1934	John Robert Cooke	Conservative
Sourced from the Ontario Legislative Assembly
Merged into Hastings East and Hastings West ridings before the 1934 election

== Election results ==
1929 Ontario general election
Party	Candidate	Votes
Conservative	John Robert Cooke	acclaimed
Source: Elections Ontario

1926 Ontario general election
Party	Candidate	Votes	%	±%
Conservative	John Robert Cooke	4,008	67.23	–4.55
Prohibitionist	Lucas M. Sharpe	1,954	32.77	–
Total valid votes		5,962	99.43	
Total rejected ballots		34	0.57	–0.38
Turnout		5,996	60.92	+2.78
Eligible voters		9,842		
Conservative hold		Swing		–2.27
Source: Elections Ontario

1923 Ontario general election
Party	Candidate	Votes	%	±%
Conservative	John Robert Cooke	4,356	71.77	–
United Farmers	John McCaffrey	1,713	28.23	–
Total valid votes		6,069	99.05	
Total rejected ballots		58	0.95	–
Turnout		6,127	58.15	–
Eligible voters		10,537		
Conservative hold		Swing		–
Source: Elections Ontario

1919 Ontario general election
Party	Candidate	Votes
Conservative	John Robert Cooke	acclaimed
Source: Elections Ontario

1914 Ontario general election
Party	Candidate	Votes	%	±%
Conservative	John Robert Cooke	2,247	79.01	–
Liberal	John P. MacInnes	597	20.99	–
Total valid votes		2,844	99.34	
Total rejected ballots		19	0.66	–
Turnout		2,863	61.53	–
Eligible voters		4,653		
Conservative hold		Swing		–
Source: Elections Ontario

1911 Ontario general election
Party	Candidate	Votes	%	±%
Conservative	John Robert Cooke	acclaimed		
Source: Elections Ontario

1908 Ontario general election
Party	Candidate	Votes	%	±%
Conservative	Josiah Williams Pearce	2,225	65.42	–9.09
Independent Conservative	Archibald Riddell	1,176	34.58	–
Total valid votes		3,401	99.53	
Total rejected ballots		16	0.47	+0.28
Turnout		3,417	64.19	+20.17
Eligible voters		5,323		
Conservative hold		Swing		–4.54
Source: Elections Ontario

1905 Ontario general election
Party	Candidate	Votes	%	±%
Conservative	Josiah Williams Pearce	2,327	74.51	+21.33
Liberal	Luther Cornell	796	25.49	–21.33
Total valid votes		3,123	99.81	
Total rejected ballots		6	0.19	–1.29
Turnout		3,129	44.02	–25.41
Eligible voters		7,108		
Conservative hold		Swing		+21.33
Source: Elections Ontario

1902 Ontario general election
Party	Candidate	Votes	%	±%
Conservative	Josiah Williams Pearce	2,643	53.18	+0.63
Liberal	Byron O. Lott	2,327	46.82	–0.63
Total valid votes		4,970	98.51	
Total rejected ballots		75	1.49	+1.49
Turnout		5,045	69.43	–
Eligible voters		7,266		
Conservative hold		Swing		+0.63
Source: Elections Ontario

Ontario provincial by-election, December 27, 1898 Resignation of William John Allen in exchange for withdrawal of election petition
Party	Candidate	Votes	%	±%
Conservative	William John Allen	2,624	52.55	–0.25
Liberal	Byron O. Lott	2,369	47.45	+0.25
Total valid votes		4,993	100.00	
Total rejected ballots		–		
Turnout		4,993	–	–
Eligible voters				
Conservative hold		Swing		–0.25
Source: Elections Ontario

1898 Ontario general election
Party	Candidate	Votes	%	±%
Conservative	William John Allen	2,374	52.80	+3.51
Liberal	Byron O. Lott	2,122	47.20	–
Total valid votes		4,496	100.00	
Total rejected ballots		–		
Turnout		4,496	99.91	+38.54
Eligible voters		4,500		
Conservative gain from Patrons of Industry		Swing		+1.76
Source: Elections Ontario

1894 Ontario general election
Party	Candidate	Votes	%	±%
Patrons of Industry	James Haggerty	1,782	50.71	–
Conservative	Alpheus Field Wood	1,732	49.29	–
Total valid votes		3,514	99.32	
Total rejected ballots		24	0.68	–
Turnout		3,538	61.37	–
Eligible voters		5,765		
Patrons of Industry gain from Conservative		Swing		–
Source: Elections Ontario

1890 Ontario general election
Party	Candidate	Votes
Conservative	Alpheus Field Wood	acclaimed
Source: Elections Ontario

1886 Ontario general election
Party	Candidate	Votes	%	±%
Conservative	Alpheus Field Wood	1,863	62.88	+8.61
Liberal	George Faulkner	1,100	37.12	–8.61
Total valid votes		2,963	99.93	
Total rejected ballots		2	0.07	–0.62
Turnout		2,965	63.71	–1.22
Eligible voters		4,654		
Conservative hold		Swing		+8.61
Source: Elections Ontario

1883 Ontario general election
Party	Candidate	Votes	%	±%
Conservative	Alpheus Field Wood	1,324	54.26	+2.91
Liberal	Peter Vankleek	1,116	45.74	–2.91
Total valid votes		2,440	99.31	
Total rejected ballots		17	0.69	+0.69
Turnout		2,457	64.93	+1.66
Eligible voters		3,784		
Conservative hold		Swing		+2.91
Source: Elections Ontario

1879 Ontario general election
Party	Candidate	Votes	%	±%
Conservative	George Henry Boulter	1,081	51.35	−3.79
Independent	Peter Vankleek	1,024	48.65	
Total valid votes		2,105	63.27	−11.35
Eligible voters		3,327		
Conservative hold		Swing		−3.79
Source: Elections Ontario

1875 Ontario general election
Party	Candidate	Votes	%	±%
Conservative	George Henry Boulter	960	55.14	−30.90
Liberal	E.D. O'Flynn	781	44.86	+30.90
Turnout		1,741	74.62	+33.33
Eligible voters		2,333		
Conservative hold		Swing		−30.90
Source: Elections Ontario

1871 Ontario general election
Party	Candidate	Votes	%	±%
Conservative	George Henry Boulter	604	86.04	+22.31
Liberal	G.W. Ostrom	98	13.96	−22.31
Turnout		702	41.29	−28.02
Eligible voters		1,700		
Conservative hold		Swing		+22.31
Source: Elections Ontario

1867 Ontario general election
Party	Candidate	Votes	%
Conservative	George Henry Boulter	970	63.73
Liberal	Stephen Reed	552	36.27
Total valid votes		1,522	69.31
Eligible voters		2,196	
Conservative pickup new district.			
Source: Elections Ontario
