= Josiah Williams Pearce =

Canadian politician

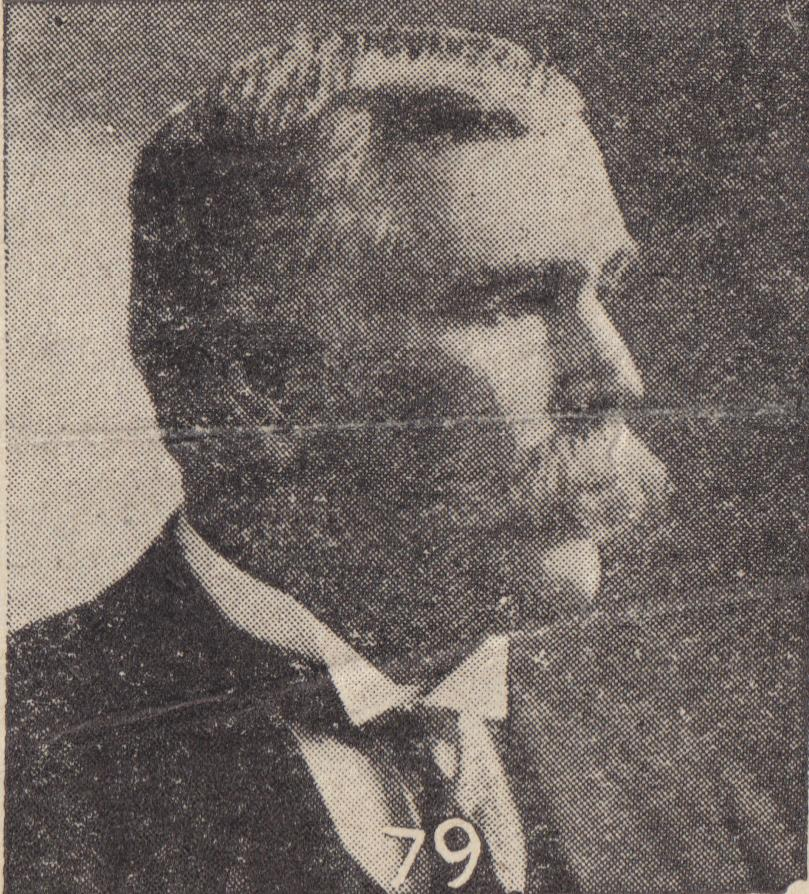

Ontario MPP
- In office 1902–1911
- Preceded by: William John Allen
- Succeeded by: John Robert Cooke
- Constituency: Hastings North

Personal details
- Born: January 18, 1850 Norwood, Canada West
- Died: May 25, 1938 (aged 88) Belleville, Ontario
- Party: Conservative
- Spouse(s): Bessie Bramley (m. 1877); Julia C. Houston (m. 1891); Mary Pearce
- Occupation: Merchant

Josiah Williams "Si" Pearce (January 18, 1850 – May 25, 1938) was a merchant and politician in Ontario, Canada. He represented Hastings North in the Legislative Assembly of Ontario from 1902 to 1911 as a Conservative member.

The son of Peter Pearce and Almira Edmonds, he was born in Norwood, Canada West, and was educated there. Pearce began working as a clerk in a general store there, later moving to Marmora, where he opened his own business. He served as reeve for Marmora from 1890 to 1893 and from 1895 to 1902, and was warden for Hastings County in 1901. He was also secretary-treasurer for the Pearce Lumber Company. Pearce built the first retail mall in Marmora which included a bakery, a livery store and the town newspaper office.

Pearce was married three times: first to Bessie Bramley in 1877, then to Julia C. Houston in 1891 and finally to Mary.

From 1911 to 1923, he was bursar for the Ontario School for the Deaf in Belleville. Pearce died in Belleville at the age of 88.
