= Samuel Wood (Ontario politician) =

Canadian politician

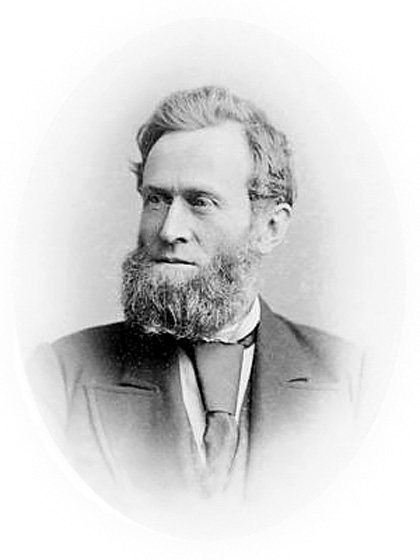

Ontario MPP
- In office 1871–1883
- Preceded by: Thomas Matchett
- Succeeded by: Duncan John McIntyre
- Constituency: Victoria South

Personal details
- Born: December 27, 1830 Bath, Upper Canada
- Died: April 11, 1913 (aged 82) Toronto, Ontario
- Party: Liberal
- Relations: Alpheus Field Wood, brother
- Occupation: Businessman

Samuel Casey Wood (December 27, 1830 – April 11, 1913) was a Canadian businessman and politician, who served as a member of the Legislative Assembly of Ontario from 1871 to 1883, representing the electoral district of Victoria South as a Liberal member. Wood served as provincial treasurer from 1877 to 1883.

He was born in Bath in Upper Canada in 1830. He received a teaching certificate and taught at several schools. Around 1856, he opened a store in Victoria County. He served as county clerk and treasurer from 1860 to 1876. He elected to the provincial legislature in 1871. In 1875, he was named provincial secretary and commissioner of agriculture and, in 1877, became provincial treasurer as well as commissioner of agriculture. He retired from politics in 1883.

Wood was a patron of the Anglican Church of the Redeemer. He died in Toronto on April 11, 1913.

His brother Alpheus Field Wood also served as a member of the Ontario assembly.

== Electoral history ==
1871 Ontario general election: Victoria South
Party	Candidate	Votes	%
Liberal	Samuel Wood	1,046	60.05
Liberal	Thomas Matchett	696	39.95
Turnout		1,742	59.97
Eligible voters		2,905	
Liberal hold			
Source: Elections Ontario

1875 Ontario general election: Victoria South
Party	Candidate	Votes	%	±%
Liberal	Samuel Wood	1,326	56.38	−43.62
Conservative	W. Cottingham	1,026	43.62	
Total valid votes		2,352	68.29	+8.33
Eligible voters		3,444		
Liberal hold		Swing		−43.62
Source: Elections Ontario

Ontario provincial by-election, 1875: Victoria South Ministerial by-election
Party	Candidate	Votes	%	±%
Liberal	Samuel Wood	1,304	51.50	−4.88
Independent	A. Hudspeth	1,228	48.50	
Total valid votes		2,532		
Liberal hold		Swing		−4.88
Source: History of the Electoral Districts, Legislatures and Ministries of the Province of Ontario

Preceded by Adam Crooks	Treasurer of Ontario; 1877–1883	Succeeded by Alexander Ross
