= Victoria South (provincial electoral district) =

Ontario electoral district

Defunct provincial electoral district
- Legislature: Legislative Assembly of Ontario
- District created: 1867
- District abolished: 1933
- First contested: 1867
- Last contested: 1929

Victoria South was an electoral riding in Ontario, Canada. It was created in 1867 at the time of confederation. In 1886 the riding was reconfigured with Victoria North to form Victoria East and Victoria West ridings. It was re-established in 1914 and finally abolished in 1933 before the 1934 election.

== Members of Provincial Parliament ==
Victoria South
Assembly	Years	Member	Party
1st	1867–1871	Thomas Matchett	Liberal
2nd	1871–1874	Samuel Wood	Liberal
3rd	1875–1879	Samuel Wood	Liberal
4th	1879–1883	Samuel Wood	Liberal
5th	1883–1886	Duncan John McIntyre	Liberal
Victoria East and Victoria West, 1886-1914
14th	1914–1919	John Carew	Conservative
15th	1919–1923	Frederick George Sandy	United Farmers
16th	1923–1926	Robert John Patterson	Conservative
17th	1926–1929	Frederick George Sandy	Liberal Progressive
18th	1929–1934	Wellesley Wilson Staples	Conservative
Sourced from the Ontario Legislative Assembly
Merged into Victoria before the 1934 election

== Election results ==
1867 Ontario general election
Party	Candidate	Votes
Liberal	Thomas Matchett	Acclaimed
Source: Elections Ontario

1871 Ontario general election
Party	Candidate	Votes	%
Liberal	Samuel Wood	1,046	60.05
Liberal	Thomas Matchett	696	39.95
Turnout		1,742	59.97
Eligible voters		2,905	
Liberal hold			
Source: Elections Ontario

1875 Ontario general election
Party	Candidate	Votes	%	±%
Liberal	Samuel Wood	1,326	56.38	−43.62
Conservative	W. Cottingham	1,026	43.62	
Total valid votes		2,352	68.29	+8.33
Eligible voters		3,444		
Liberal hold		Swing		−43.62
Source: Elections Ontario

Ontario provincial by-election, 1875 Ministerial by-election
Party	Candidate	Votes	%	±%
Liberal	Samuel Wood	1,304	51.50	−4.88
Independent	A. Hudspeth	1,228	48.50	
Total valid votes		2,532		
Liberal hold		Swing		−4.88
Source: History of the Electoral Districts, Legislatures and Ministries of the Province of Ontario

1879 Ontario general election
Party	Candidate	Votes	%	±%
Liberal	Samuel Wood	1,644	51.81	+0.31
Conservative	Mr. Rusell	1,529	48.19	
Total valid votes		3,173	68.27	
Eligible voters		4,648		
Liberal hold		Swing		+0.31
Source: Elections Ontario
