= Frances Richards (Canadian artist) =

Canadian painter

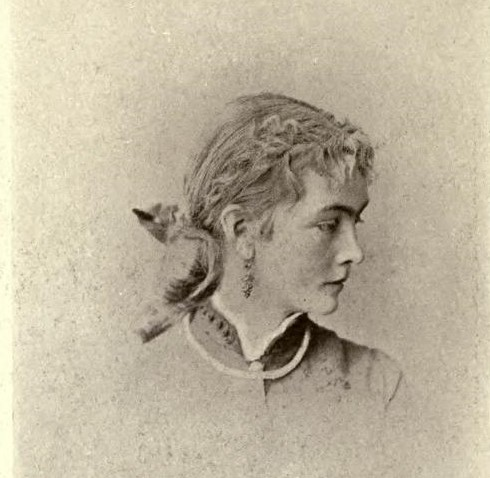
Undated photograph of Frances Richards, taken in Toronto.

Frances Richards (or Frances Richards Rowley, or Frances Elswood Richards) (1852–1934) was a Canadian painter who grew up in Canada and lived, during the latter part of her life, in England. Her portrait of Oscar Wilde may have inspired him to write The Picture of Dorian Gray. Frances Richards was born in Brockville, Ontario, the daughter of Albert Norton Richards, who was later the Lieutenant-Governor of British Columbia. In 1888 she married William Edwin Rowley in London.

Richards studied in Paris at the Académie Julian. In Paris she made friends with the Russian painter Marie Bashkirtseff (1858–1884), who painted her portrait. Richards returned to Canada and in 1881 became an associate of the Royal Canadian Academy of Arts and director of the Ottawa School of Art. Richards exhibited at the Paris Salon in 1883.

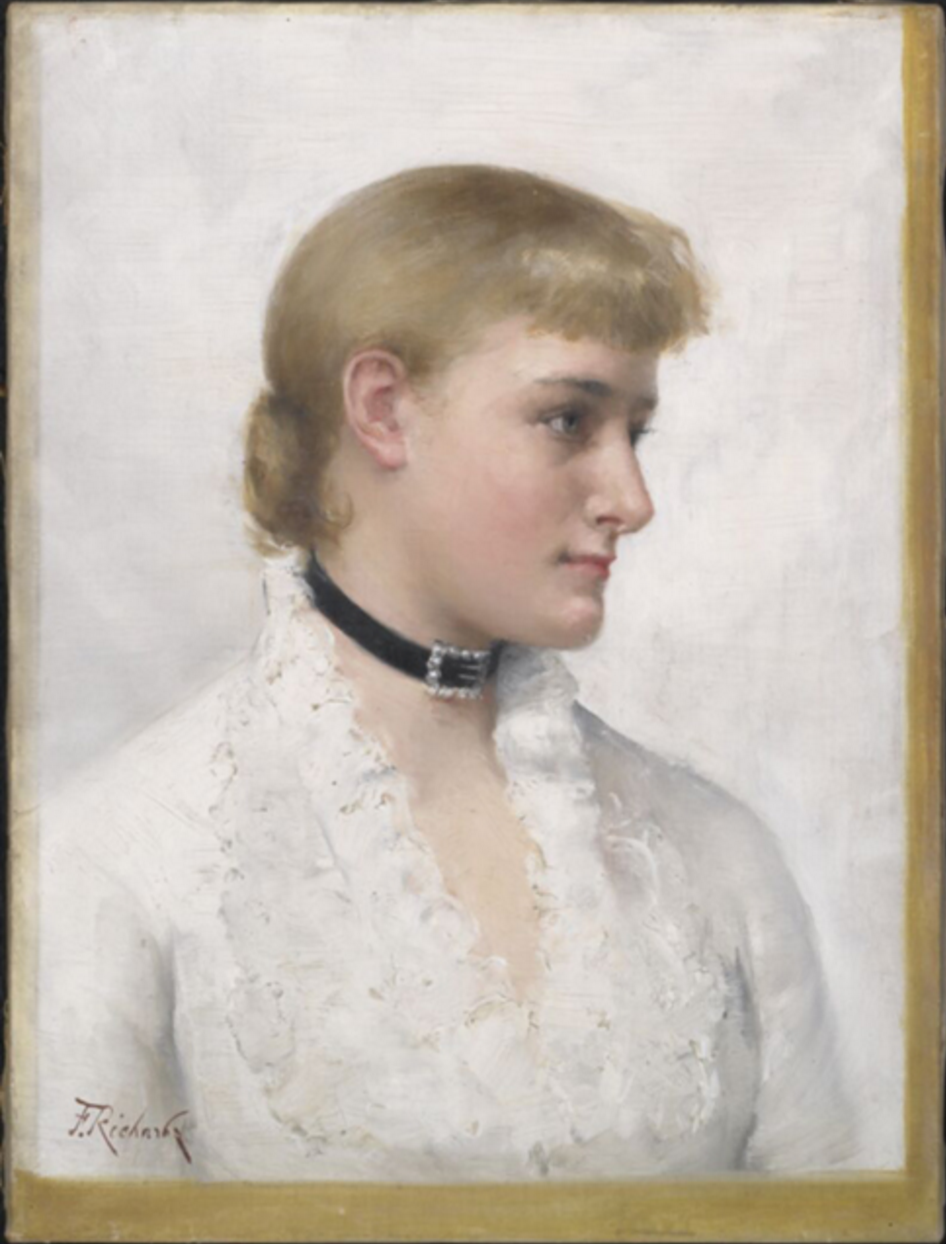
Portrait of an unidentified woman (c. 1884–1887), in the National Gallery of Canada

In 1882 Richards met the Irish writer Oscar Wilde in Ottawa. He visited her studios and wrote a letter of introduction for her to the American artist James McNeill Whistler, who was living in London. In 1887 Richards moved to London where she renewed her acquaintance with Wilde and painted his portrait, on which he commented "What a tragic thing it is, this portrait will never grow old and I shall". This may have been the inspiration for Wilde's famous novel The Picture of Dorian Gray.

I want you to know, and to know is to delight in, Miss Richards, who is an artist, and a little oasis of culture in Canada. She does really good work [...] She is already devoted to your pictures, or rather to my descriptions of them [...] She is quite worthy of your blue and white china.

— Oscar Wilde, letter to James McNeill Whistler (1882)

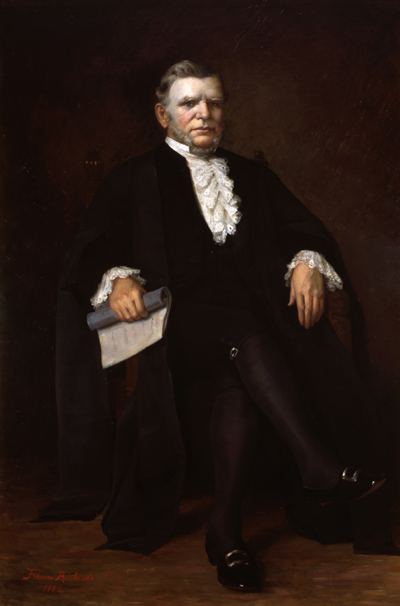
Richards' portrait of her uncle William Buell Richards, Chief Justice of Canada

Richards was a close friend of the journalist and art critic Robbie Ross, who like Richards was a Canadian living in England. Ross was a close friend of Oscar Wilde, and was his literary executor.

Richards was known for her portrait paintings. Her portrait of her uncle William Buell Richards, the first Chief Justice of Canada, still hangs in the Supreme Court of Canada building in Ottawa. A portrait by Richards is in the collection of the National Gallery of Canada.

Richards died in Glassonby, Cumberland, England on 26 November 1934.
