= William Henry Hammell =

Canadian politician

Ontario MPP
- In office 1883–1894
- Preceded by: Charles Robinson
- Succeeded by: Edward Alfred Little
- Constituency: Cardwell

Personal details
- Born: December 22, 1845 Tecumseth Township, Simcoe County, Canada West
- Died: June 19, 1937 (aged 91) Simcoe, Ontario
- Party: Conservative
- Spouse: Margaret Robinson (m. 1878)
- Children: 5
- Occupation: Farmer

William Henry Hammell (December 22, 1845 – June 19, 1937) was an Ontario farmer and political figure. He represented Cardwell in the Legislative Assembly of Ontario from 1883 to 1894 as a Conservative member.

He was born in Tecumseth Township, Simcoe County, Canada West in 1845, the son of Irish immigrants and studied at the Rockwood Academy. He married Maggie Robinson in 1878. Hammell was reeve for Tecumseth and a director for the Simcoe Mutual Fire Insurance Company.
