= Duncan John McIntyre =

Canadian politician

Ontario MPP
- In office 1883–1886
- Preceded by: Samuel Wood
- Succeeded by: Riding abolished
- Constituency: Victoria South

Personal details
- Born: 22 December 1841 Tiree, Scotland
- Died: 8 September 1920 (aged 78) Whitby, Ontario, Canada
- Party: Liberal
- Spouse: Margaret Whiteside (m. 1873)
- Occupation: Lawyer

Duncan John McIntyre (12 December 1841 - 8 September 1920) was an Ontario lawyer and political figure. He represented Victoria South in the Legislative Assembly of Ontario as a Liberal member from 1883 to 1886.

He was born in 1841 on the isle of Tiree, Scotland the son of John McIntyre, and came to Mariposa Township, Canada West in 1847 with his family. McIntyre was called to the bar in 1871. He married Margaret Whiteside in 1873. He died in 1920.
