= John Craig (Ontario MPP) =

Canadian politician

Ontario MPP
- In office 1894–1898
- Preceded by: James Kirkwood
- Succeeded by: John Morison Gibson
- Constituency: Wellington East

Personal details
- Born: June 15, 1843 County Antrim, Northern Ireland
- Died: September 6, 1898 (aged 55) Fergus, Ontario
- Party: Liberal
- Spouse: Mary Jane Lundy (m. 1868)
- Occupation: Newspaper publisher

John Craig (1843 – September 6, 1898) was an Irish-born Ontario newspaper publisher and political figure. He represented Wellington East in the Legislative Assembly of Ontario from 1894 to 1898 as a Liberal member.

He was born in County Antrim, Ireland and educated there. Craig was editor and owner of the Fergus News-Record, which he purchased with his brother Robert in 1869. He served on the Fergus Board of Education, serving two years as chairman.

Craig died in office shortly after his reelection in 1898. His son James took over the operation of the newspaper but died four years later. James' wife Alice sold the paper after running it herself for a few months.
