= John Flesher =

Canadian politician

Ontario MPP
- In office 1875–1879
- Preceded by: George McManus
- Succeeded by: Charles Robinson
- Constituency: Cardwell

Personal details
- Born: June 8, 1833 Duffield, Derbyshire, England
- Died: March 5, 1910 (aged 76)
- Party: Conservative
- Spouse: Mary Ann Fowler (m. 1855)
- Children: 9
- Occupation: Merchant

John Flesher (June 8, 1833 – March 5, 1910) was an Ontario merchant and political figure.

== Early life ==
Flesher was born in Duffield, Derbyshire, England in 1833, the son of Rev. John Flesher, a Methodist preacher and Jane (née Cawood) Flesher. He was educated in a collegiate institute at Ramsgate.

== Settler and businessman ==
Flesher emigrated to Canada West in 1847 at the age of 14 with his older brother William, who was to become an MP and a prominent figure in the settlement of Grey County. John first settled in Flesherton, the village that his brother had founded, where he helped his brother operate a grist mill and saw mill. In 1855, he married Mary Ann Fowler, the only daughter of Rev. William Fowler of New York City; together they would raise twelve children, nine of whom survived infancy.

In 1857, he became the Flesherton post master, a position his brother had also held, but after six months, he resigned and moved his family to Albion, Ontario to open a store. He returned almost immediately to Grey County, then the following year, he purchased a mill property owned by his brother in Adjala Township, where for the next ten years he manufactured flour and lumber. He also started his political career, serving as a school trustee.

In 1868, he moved to the village of Orangeville, Ontario, where he operated a store for a few years before switching to brokerage and conveyancing. He also became a Master Mason.

== Politician ==
When Orangeville was incorporated as a town in 1874, he was elected to the first town council, and served as councillor for several terms.

Flesher was elected to the Legislative Assembly of Ontario, representing the Cardwell district as a Conservative from 1875 to 1879, and was lauded as "a conscientious and earnest advocate of the principles of that party..."

=== Electoral history ===
1875 Ontario general election: Cardwell
Party	Candidate	Votes	%	±%
Conservative	John Flesher	1,208	52.80	
Liberal	T.O. Bowls	1,080	47.20	+10.36
Turnout		2,288	66.82	−0.31
Eligible voters		3,424		
Conservative gain from Liberal–Conservative		Swing		−5.18
Source: Elections Ontario

1879 Ontario general election: Cardwell
Party	Candidate	Votes	%	±%
Liberal	Charles Robinson	1,261	50.60	+3.40
Conservative	John Flesher	1,231	49.40	−3.40
Total valid votes		2,492	70.94	+4.11
Eligible voters		3,513		
Liberal gain from Conservative		Swing		+3.40
Source: Elections Ontario
