= Cardwell (provincial electoral district) =

Ontario electoral district

Defunct provincial electoral district
- Legislature: Legislative Assembly of Ontario
- District created: 1867
- District abolished: 1907
- First contested: 1867
- Last contested: 1905

Cardwell was an electoral riding in Ontario, Canada. It was created in 1867 at the time of confederation and was abolished in 1907 before the 1908 election.

== Members of Provincial Parliament ==
Cardwell
Assembly	Years	Member	Party
1st	1867–1871	Thomas Swinarton	Conservative
2nd	1871–1874	George McManus	Cons-Liberal
3rd	1875–1879	John Flesher	Conservative
4th	1879–1883	Charles Robinson	Liberal
5th	1883–1886	William Henry Hammell	Conservative
6th	1886–1890	William Henry Hammell	Conservative
7th	1890–1894	William Henry Hammell	Conservative
8th	1894–1898	Edward Alfred Little	Cons-PPA
9th	1898–1902	Edward Alfred Little	Conservative
10th	1902–1904	Edward Alfred Little	Conservative
11th	1905–1906	Edward Alfred Little	Conservative
11th	1906–1908	Alexander Ferguson	Conservative
Sourced from the Ontario Legislative Assembly
Merged into Simcoe South before the 1908 election

== Election results ==
Ontario provincial by-election, September 21, 1906 Edward Alfred Little Appointed Registrar
Party	Candidate	Votes
Conservative	Alexander Ferguson	acclaimed
Source: Elections Ontario

1905 Ontario general election
Party	Candidate	Votes	%	±%
Conservative	Edward Alfred Little	1,902	65.25	+2.62
Liberal	John Temple	1,013	34.75	–2.62
Total valid votes		2,915	100.00	
Total rejected ballots		–		
Turnout		2,915	54.23	–2.27
Eligible voters		5,375		
Conservative hold		Swing		+2.62
Source: Elections Ontario

1902 Ontario general election
Party	Candidate	Votes	%	±%
Conservative	Edward Alfred Little	2,003	62.63	+7.00
Liberal	L. Hutton	1,195	37.37	–7.00
Total valid votes		3,198	99.32	
Total rejected ballots		22	0.68	+0.12
Turnout		3,220	56.50	–14.22
Eligible voters		5,699		
Conservative hold		Swing		+7.00
Source: Elections Ontario

1898 Ontario general election
Party	Candidate	Votes	%	±%
Conservative	Edward Alfred Little	2,267	55.63	+0.70
Liberal	William Wright	1,808	44.37	+44.19
Total valid votes		4,075	99.44	
Total rejected ballots		23	0.56	–0.19
Turnout		4,098	70.72	+5.54
Eligible voters		5,795		
Conservative gain from Conservative-Patron		Swing		–21.75
Source: Elections Ontario

1894 Ontario general election
Party	Candidate	Votes	%	±%
Conservative-Patron	Edward Alfred Little	1,888	54.93	–
Conservative-Patron	E. Jeffs	1,543	44.89	–
Liberal	Charles Robinson	6	0.17	–
Total valid votes		3,437	99.25	
Total rejected ballots		26	0.75	+0.19
Turnout		3,463	65.18	+23.37
Eligible voters		5,313		
Conservative-Patron gain from Conservative		Swing		+0.00
Source: Elections Ontario

1890 Ontario general election
Party	Candidate	Votes	%	±%
Conservative	William Henry Hammell	1,183	50.97	–8.74
Conservative	Haughton Lennox	1,138	49.03	–10.68
Total valid votes		2,321	99.44	
Total rejected ballots		13	0.56	+0.36
Turnout		2,334	41.81	–15.85
Eligible voters		5,582		
Conservative hold		Swing		+0.97
Source: Elections Ontario

1886 Ontario general election
Party	Candidate	Votes	%	±%
Conservative	William Henry Hammell	1,805	59.71	+8.96
Liberal	J. A. Proctor	1,218	40.29	–8.96
Total valid votes		3,023	99.80	
Total rejected ballots		6	0.20	+0.20
Turnout		3,029	57.66	–
Eligible voters		5,253		
Conservative hold		Swing		+8.96
Source: Elections Ontario

Ontario provincial by-election, December 14, 1883 1883 election declared void
Party	Candidate	Votes	%	±%
Conservative	William Henry Hammell	1,565	50.75	+0.07
Liberal	Charles Robinson	1,519	49.25	–0.07
Total valid votes		3,084	100.00	
Total rejected ballots		–		
Turnout		3,084	–	–
Eligible voters				
Conservative hold		Swing		+0.07
Source: Elections Ontario

1883 Ontario general election
Party	Candidate	Votes	%	±%
Conservative	William Henry Hammell	1,500	50.68	+1.28
Liberal	Charles Robinson	1,460	49.32	–1.28
Total valid votes		2,960	99.23	
Total rejected ballots		23	0.77	+0.77
Turnout		2,983	80.17	+9.23
Eligible voters		3,721		
Conservative gain from Liberal		Swing		+1.28
Source: Elections Ontario

1879 Ontario general election
Party	Candidate	Votes	%	±%
Liberal	Charles Robinson	1,261	50.60	+3.40
Conservative	John Flesher	1,231	49.40	−3.40
Total valid votes		2,492	70.94	+4.11
Eligible voters		3,513		
Liberal gain from Conservative		Swing		+3.40
Source: Elections Ontario

1875 Ontario general election
Party	Candidate	Votes	%	±%
Conservative	John Flesher	1,208	52.80	–
Liberal	T.O. Bowls	1,080	47.20	+10.36
Turnout		2,288	66.82	−0.31
Eligible voters		3,424		
Conservative gain from Liberal–Conservative		Swing		−5.18
Source: Elections Ontario

1871 Ontario general election
Party	Candidate	Votes	%	±%
Liberal–Conservative	George McManus	1,116	63.16	
Liberal	Mr. Cumberland	651	36.84	−10.79
Turnout		1,767	67.14	−17.82
Eligible voters		2,632		
Liberal–Conservative gain from Conservative		Swing		+5.40
Source: Elections Ontario

1867 Ontario general election
Party	Candidate	Votes	%
Conservative	Thomas Swinarton	1,151	52.37
Liberal	George McManus	1,047	47.63
Total valid votes		2,198	84.96
Eligible voters		2,587	
Conservative pickup new district.			
Source: Elections Ontario
