= Alpheus Field Wood =

Canadian politician (1828–1910)

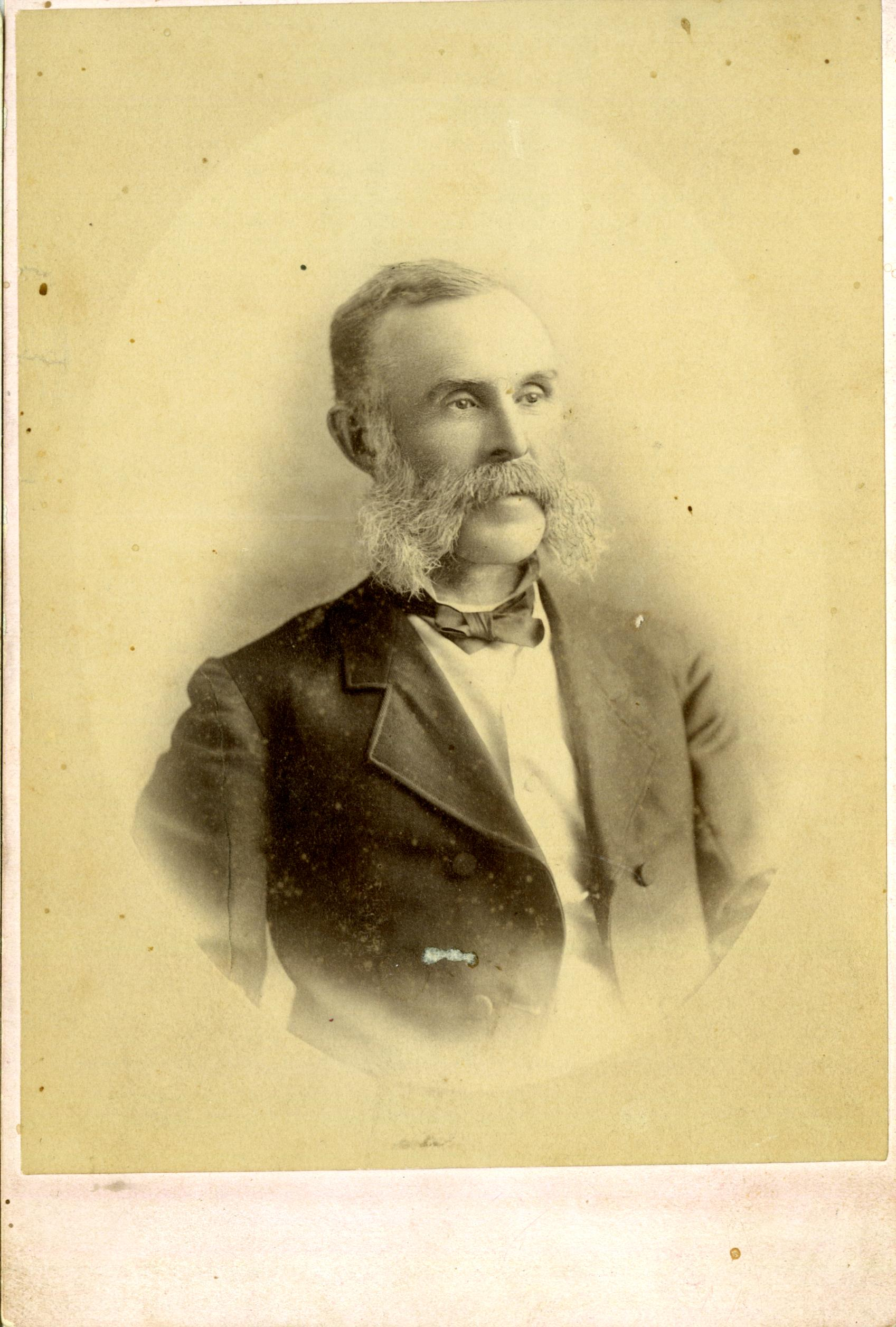

Ontario MPP
- In office 1883–1894
- Preceded by: George Henry Boulter
- Succeeded by: James Haggerty
- Constituency: Hastings North

Personal details
- Born: May 30, 1828 Jefferson County, New York, U.S.
- Died: January 22, 1910 (aged 81) Madoc, Ontario
- Party: Conservative
- Spouse: Eliza Ann Ross (m. 1850)
- Relations: Samuel Casey Wood (brother)
- Occupation: Merchant

Alpheus Field Wood (May 30, 1828 – January 22, 1910) was an Ontario merchant and political figure. He represented Hastings North in the Legislative Assembly of Ontario from 1883 to 1894 as a Conservative member.

He was born in Jefferson County, New York in 1828, the son of Thomas Wood, who had settled in Bath, Upper Canada in 1810. He was educated in Upper Canada, taught school in Hastings County for three years and then opened a general store in Madoc. He later became involved in the hardware business and the trade in grain. Wood served in the local militia, becoming lieutenant-colonel, and was also a justice of the peace. In 1850, he married Eliza Ann Ross. He was reeve for Madoc township from 1857 to 1877 and during that period also served ten years as warden for the county. Wood was also president of the Belleville and North Hastings Railway and a director for the Grand Junction Railway and the Toronto and Ottawa Railway. In 1880, he was named government valuator for the Dominion of Canada. He was master and treasurer for the local Masonic lodge.

He was the brother of Samuel Casey Wood, who served as treasurer of Ontario. His son, William Field Wood was a physician in South Bend, Indiana.

He died on January 22, 1910, at the age of 81.
