= John Morison Gibson =

Canadian politician (1842–1929)

The Honourable Sir John Morison Gibson KCMG KC
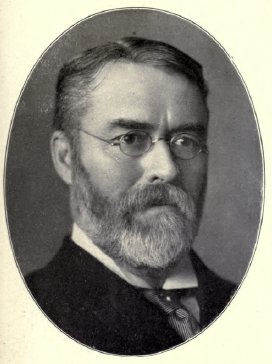

10th Lieutenant Governor of Ontario
- In office September 21, 1908 – September 26, 1914
- Monarchs: Edward VII; George V
- Governors General: The Earl Grey; The Duke of Connaught and Strathearn
- Premier: James Whitney; William Howard Hearst
- Preceded by: Sir William Mortimer Clark
- Succeeded by: John Strathearn Hendrie

Ontario MPP
- In office 1898–1904
- Preceded by: John Craig
- Succeeded by: James J. Craig
- Constituency: Wellington East
- In office 1894–1898
- Preceded by: Riding established
- Succeeded by: Edward Alexander Colquhoun
- Constituency: Hamilton West
- In office 1879–1894
- Preceded by: James Miller Williams
- Succeeded by: Riding abolished
- Constituency: Hamilton

Personal details
- Born: January 1, 1842 Toronto Township, Canada West
- Died: June 3, 1929 (aged 87) Hamilton, Ontario, Canada
- Resting place: Hamilton Cemetery
- Party: Liberal
- Spouse(s): Emily Annie Birrell (d. 1874); Caroline Hope (d. 1877); Elizabeth Malloch (m. 1881)
- Children: 1 daughter who died at birth; 4 sons and 2 daughters
- Education: University of Toronto
- Profession: militia officer, lawyer, and businessman
- Cabinet: Minister Without Portfolio (1904-1905); Attorney General (1899-1904); Commissioner of Crown Lands (1896-1899); Provincial Secretary and Registrar (1889-1896)

Sir John Morison Gibson KCMG KC (January 1, 1842 – June 3, 1929) was a Canadian politician and the tenth Lieutenant Governor of Ontario.

== Biography ==
John Gibson in 1908

John Morison Gibson, the son of Scottish immigrants, was born in 1842, in Toronto Township, Ontario. He grew up on a farm in Caledonia, Ontario, went to Hamilton Central School, in Hamilton, and went on to be educated at the University of Toronto, as a lawyer. In 1860 he joined the university company of the 2nd Battalion Volunteer Militia of The Queen's Own Rifles of Canada and was a Wimbledon marksman in 1874. He became a company director and developed a keen interest in music and art. On his return to Hamilton in 1864, he enlisted in the 13th Battalion as an ensign. In 1866, he was a lieutenant in the 13th Battalion, and fought at the Battle of Ridgeway, defending against the Fenian raids. He rose through the ranks of the 13th Battalion and was Commanding Officer from 1886 to 1895 (see regimental history Royal Hamilton Light Infantry (Wentworth Regiment)). He was a Member of the Legislature from 1879 to 1905 and held the posts of Provincial Secretary, Commissioner of Crown Lands and Attorney General of Ontario. Gibson was appointed Lieutenant Governor of Ontario in 1908, and was knighted in 1912. During his mandate, the new Government House in Chorley Park (now demolished) was completed. Gibson served as Lieutenant Governor until 1914. He was one of Hamilton's "5 Johns", who, in 1896, formed the Dominion Power and Transmission Company, that brought hydroelectric power, for the first time, to Hamilton, from their plant, at DeCew Falls. John Dickenson was another of the 5 Johns.

"One big reason" for almost 75% increase in the population of Hamilton between 1901 and 1912, boasted Sir John Morison Gibson of Dominion Power and Transmission Company, was "Cheap Electric Power Furnished By Us." This simplistic explanation for the development of Hamilton in the early twentieth century leaves much unexamined, but one conclusion cannot be disputed. In the perception of the Hamilton public, a view certainly fostered by Gibson and his fellow hydroelectric promoters, Hamilton was no longer regarded the Birmingham or the Pittsburgh of Canada Hamilton was now, as the title of a 1906 promotional booklet on the city proudly proclaimed, "The Electric City."

After receiving a grant from Andrew Carnegie of New York the city of Hamilton built a brand new Library on the south side of Main Street West, across the street from the old Library. It was officially opened by the Lieutenant Governor Sir John Morison Gibson on May 5, 1913. He was active in many charities, especially the Red Cross and child welfare. He died in Hamilton, Ontario in 1929.

Gibson was a Freemason. He was the Grand Master of the Grand Lodge of Canada in the Province of Ontario and on two occasions the Sovereign Grand Commander of the Supreme Council of the Scottish Rite in Canada.

== Tribute ==
The Gibson neighbourhood in Hamilton is named after him. it is bounded by Barton Street East (north), Main Street East (south), Wentworth Street (west) and Sherman Avenue (east). Landmarks in this neighbourhood include Cathedral High School, Budget Motor Inn, Barton Library, Hamilton-Wentworth District School Board, Hamilton-Wentworth Catholic District School Board, Powell Park and Woodland Park. Gibson Avenue, found in this neighbourhood, is also named after him.

== Electoral history ==
1879 Ontario general election: Hamilton
Party	Candidate	Votes	%
Liberal	John Morison Gibson	2,240	50.70
Conservative	Mr. Murray	2,178	49.30
Total valid votes		4,418	59.07
Eligible voters		7,479	
Liberal hold			
Source: Elections Ontario

Government offices
Preceded by Sir William Mortimer Clark	Lieutenant Governor of Ontario; 1908–1914	Succeeded by John Strathearn Hendrie
