= James Miller Williams =

Canadian politician (1818–1890)

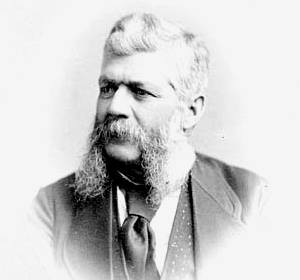

Ontario MPP
- In office 1867–1879
- Preceded by: Riding established
- Succeeded by: John Gibson
- Constituency: Hamilton

Personal details
- Born: September 14, 1818 Camden, New Jersey
- Died: November 25, 1890 (aged 72) Hamilton, Ontario
- Party: Liberal
- Spouse: M. C. Jackson (m. 1842)
- Children: 4
- Occupation: Businessman

James Miller Williams (September 14, 1818 – November 25, 1890) was a Canadian-American businessman and politician. Williams is best known for establishing the first commercially successful oil well in 1858 and igniting the first oil boom in North America. Williams is commonly viewed as the father of the petroleum industry in Canada.

== Early life ==
James Miller Williams was born in Camden, New Jersey, on September 14, 1818, and apprenticed as a carriage maker. Alongside his family, Williams emigrated to London, Canada West in 1840, where he entered into a partnership with Marcus Holmes to build carriages. At some point, Williams bought out his partner, and in 1846, he moved his carriage business to Hamilton, where he established the Hamilton Coach Factory with Henry G. Cooper. The pair owned a factory that employed forty people, and in the 1850s, they expanded their business into manufacturing railway cars for the Great Western Railway.

== Oil career ==
Williams entered the petroleum business on February 3, 1856, when he purchased 600 acres of land in Enniskillen Township from Charles Nelson Tripp, whose International Mining and Manufacturing Company had gone bankrupt. Unlike Tripp, who boiled the bitumen to produce asphalt, Williams sought to distill the hydrocarbons into lamp fuel. In the summer of 1858, Williams struck oil when he was digging for water during a local drought, becoming the first person in North America to establish a commercial oil well. Initially, Williams refined the oil and bitumen on his property in Enniskillen Township, but by 1859, he moved his refining operations to Hamilton under the name of J.M. Williams and Co. By 1861, William's refineries produced around 120 barrels of luminating and machine oil per week. Pioneering geologist and physician Abraham Gesner might have acted as a consultant in the development of the Hamilton refinery. Williams' discovery of oil and successful business venture helped kickstart the Age of Oil, incite the first oil boom in North America and demonstrated the viability of an Ontario petroleum industry. His company produced, refined and marketed petroleum products, making it the world's first integrated oil company.

In 1860, Williams reorganized his business as the Canadian Oil Company, with a capitalized value of $42,000. Out of the five shareholders, Williams held the controlling interest in the company at $14,000. By this time, Williams had amassed over 1,400 acres of land in Enniskillen township. The company marketed its kerosene as 'Victoria Oil,' and successfully sold it in Europe, South America, and China. In 1862, the Canadian Oil Company received two medals at the International Exhibition in London, one for "introducing important industry by sinking artesian wells in the Devonian stratum for petroleum” and the other for his refined oils.

In late 1860, Williams, W.E. Sanborne and Andrew Elliot formed the Black Creek Plank Road Company to better transport crude out of Enniskillen Township. Up until this point, the lack of a suitable road to transport crude to markets and refineries from Enniskillen township was a significant obstacle in the development of the local oil industry. By early 1863, the company built a plank toll road to Wyoming, Ontario, and completed a road to Sarnia in 1865.

In 1861, Williams and three others laid out the village of Oil Springs, which by 1862 had a population of 1600.

In 1870, Williams joined John Henry Fairbank and other prominent Petrolia oil producers in forming the Home Oil Works Company, a producer group that sought to limit the production of oil to the market demand. The company constructed an oil refinery near Petrolia that was capable of refining roughly 3000 barrels per week. Imperial Oil purchased the refinery in 1881.

== Marriage and children ==
Williams married Melinda Clarissa Jackson in 1842. Together, they had three sons and a daughter.

== Later life and death ==
Williams gradually passed control of the Canadian Oil Company to his son, Charles Joseph, selling full control of business in 1879. Within two years, the Canadian Oil Company merged into the Canadian Carbon Oil Company; a business made up of several leading Ontario refiners. By 1871, Williams established J.M Williams and Company, a business that produced pressed tinware. Williams sold the enterprise to his son in 1876. From 1867 to 1879, Williams represented Hamilton as a Liberal member of the Legislative Assembly of Ontario. Following Williams' retirement from politics in 1879, he served as Registrar for Wentworth County until his death in 1890.

== Honours, decorations, awards and distinctions ==
In 1997, James Miller Williams was inducted into the Canadian Petroleum Hall of Fame for digging the first successful commercial oil well in North America and creating North America's first oil company.

In 2008, Canada Post issued a stamp commemorating the first commercial oil well, featuring portraits of Charles Tripp and Williams.

== Electoral history ==
1867 Ontario general election: Hamilton
Party	Candidate	Votes	%
Liberal	James Miller Williams	1,193	53.88
Conservative	Mr. O'Reily	1,021	46.12
Total valid votes		2,214	58.23
Eligible voters		3,802	
Liberal pickup new district.			
Source: Elections Ontario

1871 Ontario general election: Hamilton
Party	Candidate	Votes	%	±%
Liberal	James Miller Williams	1,294	54.23	+0.35
Conservative	Mr. Brown	1,092	45.77	−0.35
Turnout		2,386	60.54	+2.31
Eligible voters		3,941		
Liberal hold		Swing		+0.35
Source: Elections Ontario

1875 Ontario general election: Hamilton
Party	Candidate	Votes
Liberal	James Miller Williams	Acclaimed
Source: Elections Ontario
