= Alexander David Ferrier =

Canadian politician (1813–1890)

Ontario MPP
- In office 1867–1871
- Preceded by: Riding established
- Succeeded by: Charles Clarke
- Constituency: Wellington Centre

Personal details
- Born: November 13, 1813 Edinburgh, Scotland
- Died: August 4, 1890 (aged 76) Fergus, Ontario
- Party: Conservative
- Occupation: Justice of the Peace

Alexander David Ferrier (November 13, 1813 – August 4, 1890) was an Ontario political figure. He represented Wellington Centre in the Legislative Assembly of Ontario as a Conservative member from 1867 to 1871.

He was born in Edinburgh, Scotland in 1813, was educated at the University of Edinburgh and came to Quebec City with his father in 1830. He worked for a merchant in Quebec until 1834 and then settled on a farm near Fergus. He became a justice of the peace in 1843. Ferrier served in the local militia during the Upper Canada Rebellion and was named lieutenant-colonel in 1859. In 1846, he found work as a bookkeeper for a milling company in Elora. He moved to Guelph in 1849 but later returned to Fergus. He was a member of the district council and then served as clerk for the Wellington County council from 1849 to 1871. Ferrier returned to Scotland for three years after his term in the provincial legislature, but then came back to Fergus. He was chairman of the school board at Fergus from 1879 to 1884.

== Electoral history ==
1867 Ontario general election: Wellington Centre
Party	Candidate	Votes	%
Conservative	Alexander David Ferrier	1,106	44.36
Liberal	J.S. Armstrong	1,048	42.04
Independent	J. Loghrin	339	13.60
Total valid votes		2,493	79.24
Eligible voters		3,146	
Conservative pickup new district.			
Source: Elections Ontario
