= Thomas Matchett =

Canadian businessman and political figure

Ontario MPP
- In office 1867–1871
- Preceded by: Riding established
- Succeeded by: Samuel Wood
- Constituency: Victoria South

Personal details
- Born: May 3, 1826
- Died: January 10, 1900 (aged 73)
- Party: Liberal
- Spouse: Letitia Jane Hughes (m. 1850)

Thomas Matchett (May 3, 1826 – January 10, 1900) was an Ontario businessman and political figure. He represented Victoria South in the Legislative Assembly of Ontario as a Liberal member from 1867 to 1871.

Matchett, who owned a pharmacy in Omemee, Ontario, was defeated by Samuel Casey Wood for the same seat in the 1871 election. He served as clerk for Victoria County from 1876 to 1900, replacing Wood in that post. In 1850, he had married Letitia Jane Hughes.

== Electoral history ==
1867 Ontario general election: Victoria South
Party	Candidate	Votes
Liberal	Thomas Matchett	Acclaimed
Source: Elections Ontario

1871 Ontario general election: Victoria South
Party	Candidate	Votes	%
Liberal	Samuel Wood	1,046	60.05
Liberal	Thomas Matchett	696	39.95
Turnout		1,742	59.97
Eligible voters		2,905	
Liberal hold			
Source: Elections Ontario
