= George Henry Boulter =

Canadian politician

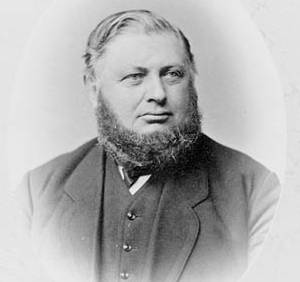

Ontario MPP
- In office 1867–1883
- Preceded by: Riding established
- Succeeded by: Alpheus Field Wood
- Constituency: Hastings North

Personal details
- Born: January 17, 1825 Prince Edward County, Upper Canada
- Died: January 18, 1894 (aged 68) Stirling, Ontario
- Party: Conservative
- Occupation: Doctor

George Henry Boulter (July 17, 1825 – January 18, 1894) was an Ontario physician and political figure. He represented Hastings North in the Legislative Assembly of Ontario as a Conservative member from 1867 to 1883.

He was born in Prince Edward County in Upper Canada in 1825. He studied at Victoria College in Cobourg and McGill College and graduated as a M.D. He served as a major in the local militia. He was reeve of Stirling and warden for Hastings County. He died at Stirling in 1894.

The geographical township of Boulter in Nipissing District and the community of Boulter in the Township of Carlow/Mayo in Hastings County were named after him.

== Electoral history ==
1867 Ontario general election: Hastings North
Party	Candidate	Votes	%
Conservative	George Henry Boulter	970	63.73
Liberal	Stephen Reed	552	36.27
Total valid votes		1,522	69.31
Eligible voters		2,196	
Conservative pickup new district.			
Source: Elections Ontario

1871 Ontario general election: Hastings North
Party	Candidate	Votes	%	±%
Conservative	George Henry Boulter	604	86.04	+22.31
Liberal	G.W. Ostrom	98	13.96	−22.31
Turnout		702	41.29	−28.02
Eligible voters		1,700		
Conservative hold		Swing		+22.31
Source: Elections Ontario

1875 Ontario general election: Hastings North
Party	Candidate	Votes	%	±%
Conservative	George Henry Boulter	960	55.14	−30.90
Liberal	E.D. O'Flynn	781	44.86	+30.90
Turnout		1,741	74.62	+33.33
Eligible voters		2,333		
Conservative hold		Swing		−30.90
Source: Elections Ontario

1879 Ontario general election: Hastings North
Party	Candidate	Votes	%	±%
Conservative	George Henry Boulter	1,081	51.35	−3.79
Independent	Mr. Vankleek	1,024	48.65	
Total valid votes		2,105	63.27	−11.35
Eligible voters		3,327		
Conservative hold		Swing		−3.79
Source: Elections Ontario
