= William Buell Jr. =

Canadian politician

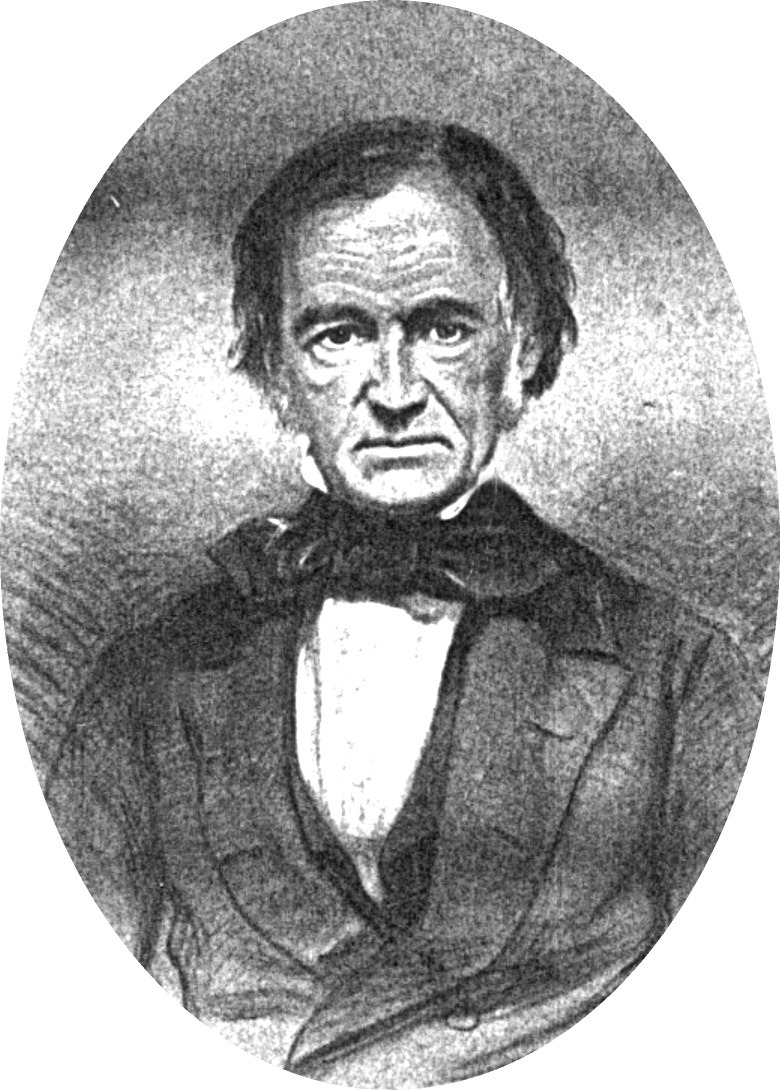
William Buell Jr. (c. 1840

William Buell (February 28, 1792 – April 29, 1862) was a journalist and political figure in Upper Canada.

== Life ==
Buell was born in Elizabethtown (later Brockville) in 1792, the son of William Buell and his wife Martha Naughton. He fought at the Battle of Crysler's Farm during the War of 1812. He operated a book store in Brockville and also served as editor of the Brockville Recorder from 1823 to 1849. The paper expressed his reform-oriented political views and also helped promote the development of the town by campaigning for improvements to transportation links. His brother Andrew Norton also contributed material to the newspaper and supported William in his political career.

He was elected to the Legislative Assembly of Upper Canada for Leeds as a Reform candidate in 1828 and again in 1830. In the next series of elections, violence at the polls by Ogle Robert Gowan's Orangemen resulted in the election results being declared invalid. Buell was eventually elected in 1836. However, Gowan and the Conservatives prevailed in the following election. During the Upper Canada Rebellion, Buell served with the local militia. He was appointed justice of the peace in the Johnstown District in 1840. In 1848, he helped elect his nephew William Buell Richards in Leeds. In 1849, he sold the newspaper and retired to his farm. He served as Brockville mayor in 1856 and 1857.

He died in Brockville in 1862.

His son Jacob Dockstader Buell served in the House of Commons and also served as mayor of Brockville.
