= John Carew (Canadian politician) =

Canadian politician

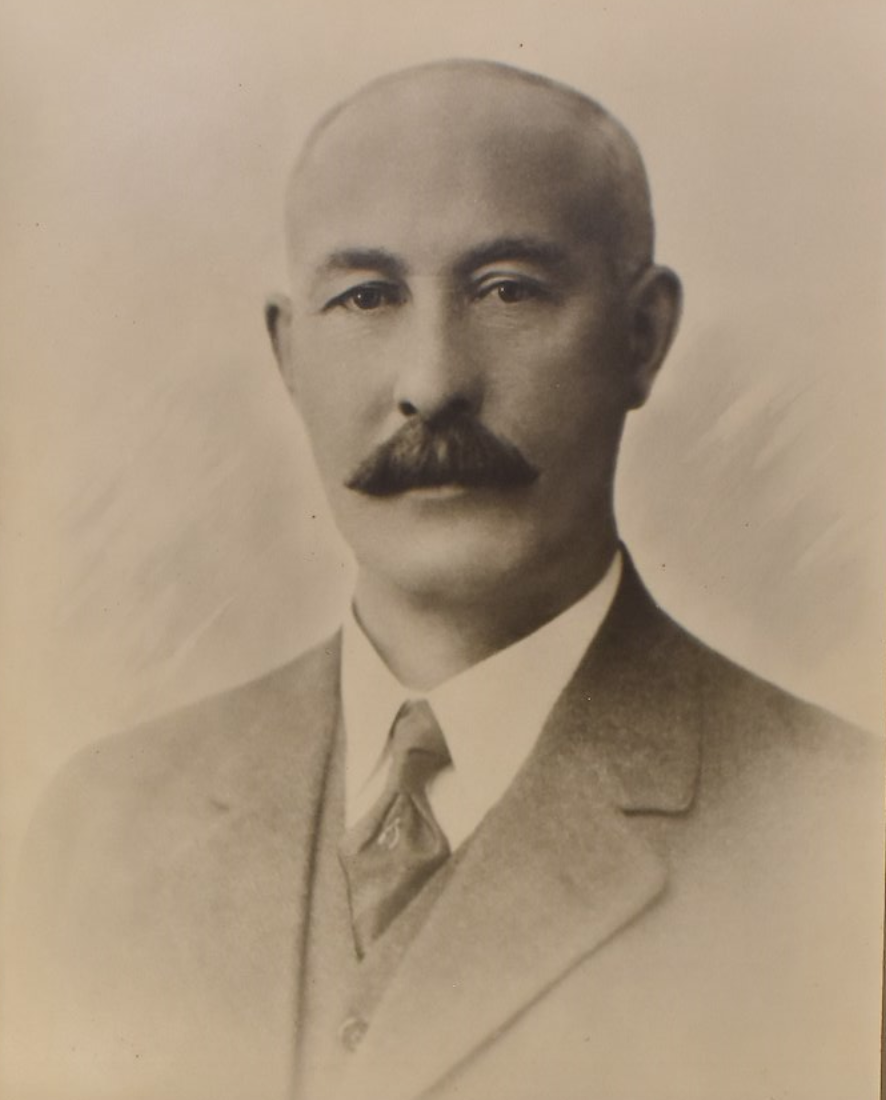

Ontario MPP
- In office 1914–1919
- Preceded by: Riding re-established
- Succeeded by: Frederick George Sandy
- Constituency: Victoria South

Personal details
- Born: January 5, 1862 Victoria County, Canada West
- Died: July 19, 1927 (aged 65) Victoria County, Ontario
- Party: Conservative
- Spouse: Margaret Kelly (m. 1885)
- Children: 4

John Carew (January 5, 1862 – July 19, 1927) was an Ontario lumber merchant and political figure. He represented Victoria South in the Legislative Assembly of Ontario as a Conservative member from 1914 to 1919.

He was born in Emily Township, Victoria County, Canada West, the son of John Carew, and educated in Lindsay. In 1885, he married Margaret Kelly. He was president and general manager of the John Carew Lumber Company in Lindsay and was also involved in woollen mills, brick manufacturing and a steamboat company. He was a governor for the Ross Memorial Hospital at Lindsay and served on the board of education. Carew was also president for the Lindsay Central Exhibition.

Two of Carew's daughters, Roberta and Gertrude, married, respectively, two brothers, Cecil and Leslie Frost who became prominent in the Ontario Progressive Conservative Party. Leslie was Premier of Ontario from 1949 to 1961. Another daughter, Annie, married Stanley Beal, the son of wealthy tannery owner Robert M. Beal who was Mayor of Lindsay and a Communist. Carew and Beal detested one another. John Carew's eldest son, Frank, was lieutenant-colonel in the Canadian Forestry Corps during World War One and a very successful curler, serving as vice-skip for legendary J.D. Flavelle, then winning two Ontario championships as skip.

He died July 19, 1927
