= Donald Robertson (politician) =

Canadian politician

Member of the Legislative Assembly of Ontario for Niagara
- In office 3 September 1867 – 27 December 1867
- Succeeded by: Stephen Richards

Personal details
- Party: Progressive Conservative

Donald Robertson was a Canadian politician and a Liberal Conservative MPP for Niagara in the Legislative Assembly of Ontario. Robertson was the MPP between 3 September 1867 and 27 December 1867.

== Electoral history ==
1867 Ontario general election: Niagara
Party	Candidate	Votes	%
Conservative	Donald Robertson	302	54.32
Liberal	James Currie	254	45.68
Total valid votes		556	76.48
Eligible voters		727	
Conservative pickup new district.			
Source: Elections Ontario
