= Niagara (provincial electoral district) =

Former provincial electoral district in Ontario, Canada

Niagara was a provincial electoral district in Ontario, Canada. It was created in 1867 at the time of Canadian Confederation.

== Members ==
Assembly	Years	Member	Party
1st	1867–1867	Donald Robertson	Conservative
1st	1867–1867	Stephen Richards	Conservative
1st	1867–1871	Stephen Richards	Conservative
2nd	1871–1875	Stephen Richards	Conservative

== Election results ==
1871 Ontario general election
Party	Candidate	Votes	%	±%
Conservative	Stephen Richards	277	62.25	−36.88
Liberal	Mr. Ball	168	37.75	
Turnout		445	56.98	+92.64
Eligible voters		781		
Conservative hold		Swing		−36.88
Source: Elections Ontario

Ontario provincial by-election, December 1867 Resignation of Donald Robertson
Party	Candidate	Votes	%	±%
Conservative	Stephen Richards	229	99.13	+44.82
Independent	Mr. Geale	2	0.87	
Total valid votes		231	100.0	−58.45
Conservative hold		Swing		+44.82
Source: History of the Electoral Districts, Legislatures and Ministries of the Province of Ontario

1867 Ontario general election
Party	Candidate	Votes	%
Conservative	Donald Robertson	302	54.32
Liberal	James Currie	254	45.68
Total valid votes		556	76.48
Eligible voters		727	
Conservative pickup new district.			
Source: Elections Ontario

== See also ==
- List of Ontario provincial electoral districts
- Canadian provincial electoral districts
