= The Recorder & Times =

Daily newspaper in Ontario, Canada

- Type: Daily newspaper
- Owner(s): Postmedia
- Founder(s): Chauncey Beach
- Founded: January 16, 1821
- City: Brockville, Ontario
- Website: https://www.recorder.ca/

The Recorder & Times is a daily newspaper published in Brockville, Ontario, Canada.

== History ==
The paper was founded as the weekly Brockville Recorder by Chauncey Beach on January 16, 1821 and later led by William Buell, Jr. as editor and owner until 1849. The newspaper began publishing a daily edition called The Evening Recorder on November 10, 1873, also owned by the holding company Recorder Printing Co.

In 1883 the Daily Times, a rival paper, was founded.

In 1918 the Recorder Printing Co. and the Daily Times merged, and on February 1 the first edition of the daily newspaper The Recorder & Times was issued.

In 1957 the weekly edition ceased publication as the company focused on the daily edition.

In 1998, the newspaper's publishers, Hunter Grant and Perry Beverley, sold the property to Sun Media, established in 1971 in Toronto. That same year, Sun Media became a subsidiary of Quebecor.

Following the sale of Sun Media in 2015, The Recorder & Times came under the control of Postmedia Network.

== See also ==
- List of newspapers in Canada
- Steve Clark - former Recorder and Times salesman and now provincial cabinet minister
