= Thomas Swinarton =

Canadian politician

Ontario MPP
- In office 1867–1871
- Preceded by: Riding established
- Succeeded by: George McManus
- Constituency: Cardwell

Personal details
- Born: 21 May 1821 County Down, Northern Ireland
- Died: 21 December 1893 (aged 72) Bolton, Ontario
- Party: Conservative
- Spouse: Eliza Parker (m. 1846)
- Occupation: Businessman

Thomas Swinarton (21 May 1821 – 21 December 1893) was an Ontario businessman and political figure. He represented Cardwell in the Legislative Assembly of Ontario from 1867 to 1871 as a Conservative.

Swinarton came to Upper Canada from County Down, Ireland. He served as reeve of Albion Township for 9 years and lived in Coventry. He was also warden for Peel County in 1881. Swinarton operated a gristmill, carding mill and sawmill, as well as a tannery and general store. He defeated George McManus in 1867 when he was elected in Cardwell.

== Electoral record ==
1867 Ontario general election: Cardwell
Party	Candidate	Votes	%
Conservative	Thomas Swinarton	1,151	52.37
Liberal	George McManus	1,047	47.63
Total valid votes		2,198	84.96
Eligible voters		2,587	
Conservative pickup new district.			
Source: Elections Ontario
