= 1867 Ontario general election =

Canadian provincial election

- August ~ September, 1867

82 seats in the 1st Legislative Assembly of Ontario 42 seats were needed for a majority
- Turnout: 73.86%
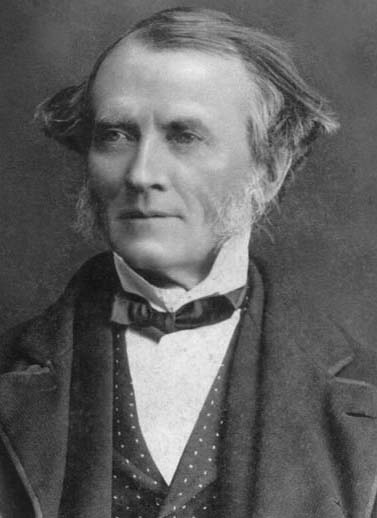

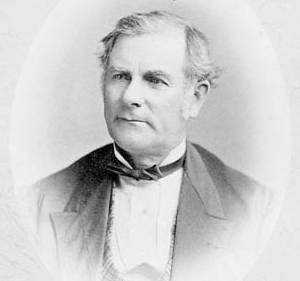
| | First party | Second party |
|---|---|---|
| Leader | John Sandfield Macdonald | Archibald McKellar |
| Party | Conservative | Liberal |
| Leader's seat | Cornwall | Bothwell |
| Seats won | 41 | 41 |
| Popular vote | 80,111 | 77,689 |
| Percentage | 50.28% | 48.76% |
Premier after election
John Sandfield Macdonald
Conservative

The 1867 Ontario general election was the first provincial election ("local election" colloquially at the time ) held in the newly created province of Ontario, upon Canadian Confederation to elected the members of Ontario 1st Legislative Assembly. The election took place in conjunction with the first Canadian federal election (called "dominion election" at the time) from late August to September that year, and on the same electoral boundaries.

The partisan make up of the legislature is not as straight forward as the numbers suggest. Political parties in the early days of confederation were characterized by "loose coalitions" that may change from issue to issue. It was clear however, that more than half of the members returned were supportive of the Patent Combination, the coalition ministry of John Sandfield Macdonald, appointed provisionally upon Canada's confederation, while those oppose were in minority, allowing the ministry to continue in government.

== Context - Politics of the Province of Canada ==
The outcome of the first Ontario election tells the story of the political mastery of one John Macdonald and the expediency of another, two erstwhile rivals both from eastern Ontario though with no familial relationship. While the more radical George Brown was the most prominent Liberal (or Reformer, as those in opposition to the Tories were known then) among the fathers of confederation and the principal rival to Canada's founding prime minister John A Macdonald, it was John Sandfield Macdonald leading a Liberal ministry who replaced John A when his Tories ministry was ousted between 1862 and 1864. With the exception of a two-day ministry led by Brown, one of two Macdonalds occupied the English co-premiership in the final decade of the United Province of Canada.

The politics of that final decade was however plagued by division along not just partisan but also religious and language lines. Governments were propped up by disgruntled opposition members with transitory loyalty and therefore were routinely on the verge of collapsing. When the united province's final Liberal ministry (or Reform ministry, the two terms being used interchangeably at the time) led by John Sandfield Macdonald collapsed in May 1864, it was the fourth government to fail in six years. Coming to terms with the unviability of the politics of the United Province, John A Macdonald's Tories (along their partner Parti bleu members in French Canada) and the Clear Grits wing of the Liberals led by George Brown entered into the Great Coalition with the goal of coming up with a sustainable arrangement of confederation. To secure Brown's buy-in, John A Macdonald gave three of the five seats designated for English speakers in his cabinet to the Liberals, a concession he refused to make in 1858 to secure Sandfield Macdonald's support. In opposition were a small faction English-speaking Liberals led by the sidelined Sandfield Macdonald and the Parti rouge from French Canada, opposing not just the government but the confederation project.

Once confederation arrangement were settled, Brown exited the coalition as planned. Recognizing the Conservatives’ extremely weak position in English Canada might prove his political undoing in the new dominion, John A set out to preserve the coalition under the Liberal-Conservative banner. Despite Sandfield Macdonald's vigorous opposition to confederation during earlier negotiations (he did not attend any of the three conferences leading to confederation and thus not among the 36 Fathers of Confederation) once it became inevitable, Sandfield Macdonald avenged his alienations from his Liberal peers by taking his small band of followers into the Liberal-Conservative coalition, and was sworn in on July 15, 1867 as the provisional premier of the newly created province. In the months that followed, the two Macdonalds went "hunting in pairs" and secured electoral mandates in their respective spheres in the concurrent elections.

== Rules of engagement ==
As a newly created province within a newly created nation, not all rules governing the conduct of election and suffrage were clearly defined. The British North America Act 1867 (known as the Constitution Act, 1867 since the 1982 patriation of Canada's constitution) prescribes a number of ground rules relevant to the first election.

- Section 70 provides for 82 members for the Legislative Assembly of Ontario, to be elected to represent the 82 electoral districts listed in the first schedule of the legislation, which were the same electoral districts used for the first election to the House of Commons of Canada that took place at the same time.
- Section 84 prescribes that the existing law of the United Province of Canada on suffrage and qualification for members to be elected would apply, but adds specifically for the electoral district of Algoma, the "new" district for the geographically vast Algoma District which was not previously represented in the final Parliament of the United Province, any male British subject of 21 years of age or older, "being a householder," would have the right to vote.
- Section 89 prescribes that the first elections for both the House of Commons and the Legislative Assembly be held at the same time and at the same place.

The elections laws of Canada West were updated in 1866, with electors required to meet a property qualification of being an owner or tenant with a property value listed on the assessment roll of $600 in a city, $400 in a town, $300 in an incorporated village, and $100 in a township or police village. (Note: The value of property required to be eligible to vote for a member of parliament is listed as $200 in an urban area and $100 in a rural area by Elections Canada's A History of the Vote in Canada, however that number provided in the publication is a general amount for the period from 1867 to 1885 before federal law was passed governing franchise.) Furthermore, urban residents must prove an annual income of at least $250. An estimated 16.5 per cent of the population of Ontario was enfranchised for the 1867 election.

The writ of election was issued on August 7, with election taking place over a number of weeks in August and September, with electoral district polls closing at different dates throughout the period. Under the system each electoral district was required to be polled in one day, but the day did not have to be the same across all electoral districts. Votes were recorded orally. The returned writs were dated (usually a few days after the actual election) as early as August 21 (in Lincoln and Grey North) to as late as September 26 (Middlesex North).

Members were elected through first past the post voting, each in a separate single-member district. This system would be in use across Ontario until 1886. Electoral district boundaries largely aligned with boundary of existing administrative divisions (counties and cities, with more populous counties further divided into multiple seats. The newly created province's inherited the boundary of Upper Canada which ceased to exist 27 year earlier. Its northern boundary was undefined, but there were few inhabitant north of Sudbury. The newly created electoral district of Algoma had the smallest electoral roll in the province. The distribution of seats are as follow:

| Region | Seats allocated | Administrative divisions | | Count | Total |
|---|---|---|---|---|---|
| Northern | 1 | District | Algoma | 1 | 1 |
| Eastern | 1 | Towns | Brockville, Cornwall, Kingston, Ottawa | 4 | 30 |
| Eastern | 1 | Counties | Addington, Carleton, Dundas, Frontenac, Glengarry, Lennox, Prescott, Prince Edward, Russell, Stormont | 10 | 30 |
| Eastern | 2 | Counties | Lanark, Northumberland, Peterborough, Renfrew, Victoria | 10 | 30 |
| Eastern | 3 | Counties | Hastings, Leeds & Grenville (together) | 6 | 30 |
| Central | 1 | Town | Hamilton, Niagara | 2 | 21 |
| Central | 1 | Counties | Cardwell, Halton, Lincoln, Monck, Peel, Welland | 6 | 21 |
| Central | 2 | Town | Toronto | 2 | 21 |
| Central | 2 | Counties | Durham, Ontario, Simcoe, Wentworth | 8 | 21 |
| Central | 3 | County | York | 3 | 21 |
| Midwestern | 1 | Counties | Haldimand | 1 | 20 |
| Midwestern | 2 | Counties | Brant, Bruce, Grey, Huron, Norfolk, Oxford, Perth, Waterloo | 16 | 20 |
| Midwestern | 3 | Counties | Wellington | 3 | 20 |
| Southwestern | 1 | Town | London | 1 | 10 |
| Southwestern | 1 | Counties | Bothwell, Essex, Kent, Lambton | 4 | 10 |
| Southwestern | 2 | Counties | Elgin | 2 | 10 |
| Southwestern | 3 | Counties | Middlesex | 3 | 10 |

== Results ==
To properly interpret and understand the election results form 1867, one should be mindful of factors that would seem peculiar in 21st century.

- Dual mandate - It was possible for a candidate to stand and be elected in more than one electoral district. It was also possible for a candidate to simultaneously hold a seat in the House of Commons and a seat in a provincial legislature. The following men were elected to both the House of Commons and the Ontario legislature that years:
  - Edward Blake, elected MP for Durham West and MLA for Bruce South, later Premier of Ontario and federal Liberal leader
  - John Carling, elected MP and MLA for London, a key lieutenant of Sir John A Macdonald and later a member of his federal cabinet
  - Thomas Roberts Ferguson, elected MP for Cardwell and MLA for Simcoe South
  - John Sandfield MacDonald, elected MP and MLA for Cornwall, Ontario's first Premier
  - Edmund Burke Wood, elected MP and MLA for Brant South, Ontario's first Treasurer in the Macdonald ministry
- Demographic - Ontario, like Canada, was overwhelmingly an agrarian, rural society in the nineteenth century. Only nine of the 82 seats were allocated to "towns". Other than the two seats for Toronto and the seat for Hamilton, the other 6 urban seats all have relatively small population. The combined population of the eight towns accounted for less than 10% of the province's population. Furthermore, with electoral boundary largely conforming with boundaries of administrative district, the population of electoral districts varied greatly, ranging from as many as 39,000 in Huron North to less than 4,000 in Niagara (according to figures from the first census of 1871, which reported Ontario population at 1,620,851)
- Loose partisanship - Partisanship in the early days of confederation was characterized by "loose coalitions" rather than formal, cohesive parties. Contemporaneous election returns did not record candidates' party affiliations. The party labels on official record for those early elections were retroactively applied after partisan political system was more formalized, and thus were not all accurate. For example, Edmund Burke Wood, one of the four dual-mandate holders and Ontario's inaugural Treasurer, was recorded as elected to the Ontario legislature as a conservative (likely because he served in the Sandfield Macdonald ministry) and to the House of Commons as a Liberal (likely because he returned to the Liberal fold in 1873 and was later appointed by Liberal prime minister Alexander McKenzie to be chief justice of Manitoba). In 1867 however, he was explicitly repudiated by the South Brant Liberal association, was elected to both seat as a coalitionist, and his opponent for the federal seat, Henry Blakey Leeming was none other than the local Liberal association president.

These are some of the factors that led to Ontario's first ministry being formed in manner that would be unfathomable in modern days. John Sandfield Macdonald, the leader of the last Liberal ministry of the United Province of Canada who ousted Conservative John A Macdonald in 1862 only to be ousted by him two years later, the vocal opponent of confederation sidelined by his Liberals peers, upon confederation transformed himself into a key ally and potent weapon of the new Prime Minister in keeping the Liberals from power. He was maneuvered into the premier's chair by John A Macdonald and led a Liberal-Conservative Patent Combination ministry during the province's first five years. While premier leading what was effectively a conservative government in Toronto, he was also recorded as a Liberal MP in Ottawa, which if true would put him in opposition to his political benefactor the prime minister. Reporting of the proceedings in Ottawa however show Sandfield Macdonald along with former Liberals who joined the federal cabinet were routinely subjects of derision by the Liberal opposition.

Elections to the 1st Parliament of Ontario (1867)
| Political party | Party leader | Candidates | Seats | Votes | |
| Political party | Party leader | Candidates | Seats | # | % |
|---|---|---|---|---|---|
| Conservative | John Sandfield Macdonald | 78 | 41 | 80,111 | 50.28% |
| Liberal | Archibald McKellar | 80 | 41 | 77,689 | 48.76% |
| Independent | | 15 | – | 1,523 | 0.96% |
| Total | | 173 | 82 | 159,323 | 100.00% |
| Registered electors | | | | 215,722 | |
| Acclamations | | █ Conservative | | 2 | |
| Acclamations | | █ Liberal | | 4 | |
| Other candidates receiving nil votes (Note: one in Lanark South) | | █ Independent | | 1 | |

Seats summary
| Conservative | 50.00% |
| Liberal | 50.00% |

=== Synopsis of results ===
Results by riding - 1867 Ontario general election
| Riding | Winning party | | | | | Turnout | Votes | | | |
| Name (Note: order is as given in EO reports) | Party | Votes | Share | Margin # | Margin % | Turnout | Con | Lib | Ind | Total |
|---|---|---|---|---|---|---|---|---|---|---|
| Addington | Con | 1,554 | 73.72% | 1,003 | 47.58% | 75.94% | 1,554 | 551 | 3 | 2,108 |
| Algoma | Con | 351 | 67.89% | 224 | 43.33% | 60.19% | 351 | 127 | 39 | 517 |
| Bothwell | Lib | 1,242 | 51.45% | 70 | 2.90% | 83.16% | 1,172 | 1,242 | – | 2,414 |
| Brant North | Lib | 706 | 53.16% | 84 | 6.33% | 72.69% | 622 | 706 | – | 1,328 |
| Brant South | Con | 1,268 | 54.37% | 204 | 8.75% | 71.45% | 1,268 | 1,064 | – | 2,332 |
| Brockville and Elizabethtown | Con | 630 | 51.05% | 26 | 2.11% | 75.38% | 630 | 604 | – | 1,234 |
| Bruce North | Lib | acclaimed | | | | | | | | |
| Bruce South | Lib | 1,726 | 50.10% | 7 | 0.20% | 84.83% | 1,719 | 1,726 | – | 3,445 |
| Cardwell | Con | 1,151 | 52.37% | 104 | 4.73% | 84.96% | 1,151 | 1,047 | – | 2,198 |
| Carleton | Lib | 987 | 47.29% | 48 | 2.30% | 88.13% | 939 | 987 | 161 | 2,087 |
| Cornwall | Con | 479 | 64.73% | 218 | 29.46% | 72.27% | 479 | 261 | – | 740 |
| Dundas | Lib | 1,162 | 53.57% | 155 | 7.15% | 79.42% | 1,007 | 1,162 | – | 2,169 |
| Durham East | Con | 1,208 | 95.19% | 1,147 | 90.39% | 43.88% | 1,208 | 61 | – | 1,269 |
| Durham West | Lib | 1,473 | 68.80% | 805 | 37.60% | 77.43% | 668 | 1,473 | – | 2,141 |
| Elgin East | Con | 1,431 | 50.44% | 25 | 0.88% | 75.47% | 1,431 | 1,406 | – | 2,837 |
| Elgin West | Con | 909 | 52.27% | 79 | 4.54% | 85.16% | 909 | 830 | – | 1,739 |
| Essex | Con | 1,566 | 53.69% | 215 | 7.37% | 75.41% | 1,566 | 1,351 | – | 2,917 |
| Frontenac | Con | 1,186 | 62.49% | 476 | 25.08% | 73.91% | 1,186 | 710 | 2 | 1,898 |
| Glengarry | Con | 1,149 | 56.71% | 272 | 13.43% | 82.59% | 1,149 | 877 | – | 2,026 |
| Grenville South | Con | 849 | 53.46% | 110 | 6.93% | 80.90% | 849 | 739 | – | 1,588 |
| Grey North | Con | 1,430 | 55.17% | 268 | 10.34% | 74.63% | 1,430 | 1,162 | – | 2,592 |
| Grey South | Con | 1,675 | 53.23% | 203 | 6.45% | 80.86% | 1,675 | 1,472 | – | 3,147 |
| Haldimand | Lib | 1,377 | 56.43% | 314 | 12.87% | 78.36% | 1,063 | 1,377 | – | 2,440 |
| Halton | Lib | 1,556 | 56.62% | 364 | 13.25% | 76.70% | 1,192 | 1,556 | – | 2,748 |
| Hamilton | Lib | 1,193 | 53.88% | 172 | 7.77% | 58.23% | 1,021 | 1,193 | – | 2,214 |
| Hastings East | Con | 908 | 57.65% | 241 | 15.30% | 75.21% | 908 | 667 | – | 1,575 |
| Hastings North | Con | 970 | 63.73% | 418 | 27.46% | 69.31% | 970 | 552 | – | 1,522 |
| Hastings West | Con | 940 | 72.92% | 591 | 45.85% | 54.50% | 940 | 349 | – | 1,289 |
| Huron North | Con | 2,030 | 50.80% | 64 | 1.60% | 72.48% | 2,030 | 1,966 | – | 3,996 |
| Huron South | Lib | 1,558 | 50.16% | 10 | 0.32% | 82.00% | 1,548 | 1,558 | – | 3,106 |
| Kent | Lib | 1,486 | 51.14% | 66 | 2.27% | 77.99% | 1,420 | 1,486 | – | 2,906 |
| Kingston | Con | 705 | 84.63% | 577 | 69.27% | 37.14% | 705 | 128 | – | 833 |
| Lambton | Lib | 2,107 | 65.80% | 1,012 | 31.61% | 75.41% | 1,095 | 2,107 | – | 3,202 |
| Lanark North | Lib | acclaimed | | | | | | | | |
| Lanark South | Con | 1,294 | 62.00% | 503 | 24.10% | 70.53% | 1,294 | 791 | 2 | 2,087 |
| Leeds North and Grenville North | Lib | 962 | 56.19% | 212 | 12.38% | 78.28% | 750 | 962 | – | 1,712 |
| Leeds South | Con | 1,380 | 50.13% | 7 | 0.25% | 83.96% | 1,380 | 1,373 | – | 2,753 |
| Lennox | Con | 1,222 | 53.29% | 396 | 17.27% | 66.35% | 1,222 | 826 | 245 | 2,293 |
| Lincoln | Con | acclaimed | | | | | | | | |
| London | Con | 948 | 61.00% | 342 | 22.01% | 56.00% | 948 | 606 | – | 1,554 |
| Middlesex East | Lib | 1,821 | 50.42% | 30 | 0.83% | 86.62% | 1,791 | 1,821 | – | 3,612 |
| Middlesex North | Lib | 1,084 | 43.69% | 38 | 1.53% | 84.79% | 1,046 | 1,084 | 351 | 2,481 |
| Middlesex West | Con | 1,100 | 52.08% | 88 | 4.17% | 87.45% | 1,100 | 1,012 | – | 2,112 |
| Monck | Con | 1,118 | 56.10% | 243 | 12.19% | 78.59% | 1,118 | 875 | – | 1,993 |
| Niagara | Con | 302 | 54.32% | 48 | 8.63% | 76.48% | 302 | 254 | – | 556 |
| Norfolk North | Con | 987 | 50.05% | 2 | 0.10% | 83.84% | 987 | 985 | – | 1,972 |
| Norfolk South | Lib | 975 | 50.47% | 18 | 0.93% | 78.06% | 957 | 975 | – | 1,932 |
| Northumberland East | Lib | 1,492 | 64.56% | 675 | 29.21% | 66.97% | 817 | 1,492 | 2 | 2,311 |
| Northumberland West | Lib | acclaimed | | | | | | | | |
| Ontario North | Lib | 1,694 | 58.70% | 502 | 17.39% | 79.26% | 1,192 | 1,694 | – | 2,886 |
| Ontario South | Lib | 1,367 | 56.35% | 308 | 12.70% | 83.60% | 1,059 | 1,367 | – | 2,426 |
| Ottawa | Lib | 810 | 68.76% | 442 | 37.52% | 41.49% | 368 | 810 | – | 1,178 |
| Oxford North | Lib | 1,187 | 55.36% | 230 | 10.73% | 58.34% | 957 | 1,187 | – | 2,144 |
| Oxford South | Lib | 1,399 | 54.52% | 232 | 9.04% | 74.64% | 1,167 | 1,399 | – | 2,566 |
| Peel | Con | 1,118 | 51.05% | 46 | 2.10% | 82.11% | 1,118 | 1,072 | – | 2,190 |
| Perth North | Con | 1,568 | 57.58% | 413 | 15.17% | 72.81% | 1,568 | 1,155 | – | 2,723 |
| Perth South | Lib | 1,552 | 56.56% | 360 | 13.12% | 80.16% | 1,192 | 1,552 | – | 2,744 |
| Peterborough East | Con | 996 | 62.52% | 399 | 25.05% | 80.82% | 996 | 597 | – | 1,593 |
| Peterborough West | Con | 670 | 50.68% | 18 | 1.36% | 78.50% | 670 | 652 | – | 1,322 |
| Prescott | Lib | 838 | 50.67% | 22 | 1.33% | 82.78% | 816 | 838 | – | 1,654 |
| Prince Edward | Lib | 1,605 | 58.66% | 474 | 17.32% | 76.53% | 1,131 | 1,605 | – | 2,736 |
| Renfrew North | Con | 802 | 71.74% | 487 | 43.56% | 80.26% | 802 | 315 | 1 | 1,118 |
| Renfrew South | Lib | 543 | 63.96% | 237 | 27.92% | 71.17% | 306 | 543 | – | 849 |
| Russell | Con | 1,287 | 65.33% | 818 | 41.52% | 68.95% | 1,287 | 469 | 214 | 1,970 |
| Simcoe North | Lib | 1,431 | 52.40% | 131 | 4.80% | 81.91% | 1,300 | 1,431 | – | 2,731 |
| Simcoe South | Con | acclaimed | | | | | | | | |
| Stormont | Con | 793 | 55.65% | 161 | 11.30% | 81.15% | 793 | 632 | – | 1,425 |
| Toronto East | Con | 1,178 | 56.28% | 264 | 12.61% | 49.80% | 1,178 | 914 | 1 | 2,093 |
| Toronto West | Con | 1,439 | 57.26% | 365 | 14.52% | 52.94% | 1,439 | 1,074 | – | 2,513 |
| Victoria North | Lib | 676 | 62.42% | 269 | 24.84% | 79.87% | 407 | 676 | – | 1,083 |
| Victoria South | Lib | acclaimed | | | | | | | | |
| Waterloo North | Lib | 908 | 50.67% | 24 | 1.34% | 71.68% | 884 | 908 | – | 1,792 |
| Waterloo South | Lib | 1,309 | 57.59% | 345 | 15.18% | 81.59% | 964 | 1,309 | – | 2,273 |
| Welland | Lib | 1,298 | 54.22% | 202 | 8.44% | 68.52% | 1,096 | 1,298 | – | 2,394 |
| Wellington Centre | Con | 1,106 | 44.36% | 58 | 2.33% | 79.24% | 1,106 | 1,048 | 339 | 2,493 |
| Wellington North | Lib | 1,434 | 51.29% | 72 | 2.58% | 81.04% | 1,362 | 1,434 | – | 2,796 |
| Wellington South | Lib | 940 | 58.42% | 271 | 16.84% | 74.56% | 669 | 940 | – | 1,609 |
| Wentworth North | Lib | 1,139 | 50.44% | 20 | 0.89% | 79.93% | 1,119 | 1,139 | – | 2,258 |
| Wentworth South | Lib | 1,002 | 50.07% | 3 | 0.15% | 83.24% | 999 | 1,002 | – | 2,001 |
| York East | Lib | 1,193 | 58.25% | 338 | 16.50% | 72.37% | 855 | 1,193 | – | 2,048 |
| York North | Lib | 1,369 | 54.20% | 212 | 8.39% | 73.90% | 1,157 | 1,369 | – | 2,526 |
| York West | Con | 587 | 46.44% | 73 | 5.78% | 56.71% | 587 | 514 | 163 | 1,264 |

= elected by acclamation
= turnout is above provincial average
= was a member of the Legislative Assembly of the Province of Canada
= was a member of the Legislative Council of the Province of Canada
= multiple candidates

=== MLAs elected by region and riding ===
Party designations are as follows:

Liberal
Conservative

Midwestern Ontario

- Brant North: Hugh Finlayson
- Brant South: Edmund Burke Wood (Note: also an MP in the House of Commons of Canada)
- Bruce North: Donald Sinclair
- Bruce South: Edward Blake
- Grey North: Thomas Scott
- Grey South: Abram William Lauder
- Haldimand: Jacob Baxter
- Huron North: William Torrance Hays
- Huron South: Robert Gibbons
- Norfolk North: James Wilson
- Norfolk South: Simpson McCall
- Oxford North: George Perry
- Oxford South: Adam Oliver
- Perth North: Andrew Monteith
- Perth South: James Trow
- Waterloo North: Moses Springer
- Waterloo South: Isaac Clemens
- Wellington Centre: Alexander David Ferrier
- Wellington North: Robert McKim
- Wellington South: Peter Gow

Southwestern Ontario

- Bothwell: Archibald McKellar
- Elgin East: Daniel Luton
- Elgin West: Nicol McColl
- Essex: Solomon Wigle
- Kent: John Smith
- Lambton: Timothy Blair Pardee
- London: John Carling
- Middlesex East: James Evans
- Middlesex North: James Sinclair Smith
- Middlesex West: Nathaniel Currie

Northern Ontario

- Algoma: Frederick William Cumberland

Peel/Simcoe/Durham/Ontario

- Cardwell: Thomas Swinarton
- Durham East: Arthur Trefusis Heneage Williams
- Durham West: John McLeod
- Ontario North: Thomas Paxton
- Ontario South: William McGill
- Peel: John Coyne
- Simcoe North: William Lount
- Simcoe South: Thomas Roberts Ferguson

York

- Toronto East: Matthew Crooks Cameron
- Toronto West: John Wallis
- York East: Hugh Powell Crosby
- York North: John McMurrich
- York West: Thomas Grahame

Wentworth/Halton/Niagara

- Halton: William Barber
- Hamilton: James Miller Williams
- Lincoln: John Charles Rykert
- Monck: George Secord
- Niagara: Donald Robertson
- Welland: William Beatty
- Wentworth North: Robert Christie
- Wentworth South: William Sexton

Ottawa Valley

- Carleton: Robert Lyon
- Lanark North: Daniel Galbraith
- Lanark South: William McNairn Shaw
- Ottawa: Richard William Scott
- Prescott: James P. Boyd
- Renfrew North: John Supple
- Renfrew South: John Lorn McDougall
- Russell: William Craig

Saint Lawrence Valley

- Brockville and Elizabethtown: William Fitzsimmons
- Cornwall: John Sandfield MacDonald
- Dundas: Simon S. Cook
- Glengarry: James Craig
- Grenville South: Mcneil Clarke
- Kingston: Maxwell W. Strange
- Leeds North and Grenville North: Henry Dolphus Smith
- Leeds South: Benjamin Tett
- Stormont: William Colquhoun

Central Ontario

- Addington: Edmund John Glyn Hooper
- Frontenac: Henry Smith
- Hastings East: Henry Corby
- Hastings North: George Henry Boulter
- Hastings West: Ketchum Graham
- Lennox: John Stevenson
- Northumberland East: John Eyre
- Northumberland West: Alexander Fraser
- Peterborough East: George Read
- Peterborough West: John Carnegie
- Prince Edward: Absalom Greeley
- Victoria North: Alexander Peter Cockburn
- Victoria South: Thomas Matchett

== See also ==
- List of Ontario political parties
- Politics of Ontario
- List of elections in the Province of Canada
