= List of Ontario by-elections =

The list of Ontario by-elections includes every by-election held in the Canadian province of Ontario. By-elections occur whenever there is a vacancy in the Legislative Assembly, although an imminent general election may allow the vacancy to remain until the dissolution of parliament.

== Causes ==
A by-election occurs whenever there is a vacancy in the Ontario legislature. Vacancies can occur for the following reasons:

- Death of a member.
- Resignation of a member.
- Voided results
- Expulsion from the legislature.
- Ineligibility to sit.

When there is a vacancy, the writ for a by-election must be issued within six months. The writ is issued on a Wednesday, the election date must be a Thursday and must be 29 days after the writ is issued. Under amendments to the Election Act approved in 2016, a by-election is no longer required when a vacancy occurs in the 12 months leading up to a fixed general election date.

== Ministerial by-elections ==
The list includes ministerial by-elections which occurred due to the requirement that incumbent members recontest their seats upon being appointed to Cabinet. These by-elections were almost always uncontested. This requirement was amended in 1926 to exempt ministers appointed within three months after a general election. In 1941 it was abolished completely.

== 44th Legislative Assembly of Ontario 2025–present ==
By-election	Date	Incumbent	Party	Winner	Party	Cause	Retained
Hamilton East—Stoney Creek	September 3, 2026	Neil Lumsden	Progressive Conservative	Jeff Beattie	Progressive Conservative	Retired	Yes
York—Simcoe	September 3, 2026	Caroline Mulroney	Progressive Conservative	Susan Lahey	Progressive Conservative	Resigned to return to private life.	Yes
Scarborough Southwest	September 3, 2026	Doly Begum	New Democratic	Fatima Shaban	New Democratic	Resigned to run in a federal by-election.	Yes

== 43rd Legislative Assembly of Ontario 2022–2025 ==
By-election	Date	Incumbent	Party	Winner	Party	Cause	Retained
Bay of Quinte	September 19, 2024	Todd Smith	Progressive Conservative	Tyler Allsopp	Progressive Conservative	Resigned to return to the private sector.	Yes
Milton	May 2, 2024	Parm Gill	Progressive Conservative	Zee Hamid	Progressive Conservative	Resigned to run for a seat in the House of Commons	Yes
Lambton—Kent—Middlesex	May 2, 2024	Monte McNaughton	Progressive Conservative	Steve Pinsonneault	Progressive Conservative	Resigned to return to the private sector	Yes
Kitchener Centre	November 30, 2023	Laura Mae Lindo	New Democratic	Aislinn Clancy	Green	Resigned to take up role at University of Waterloo.	No
Scarborough—Guildwood	July 27, 2023	Mitzie Hunter	Liberal	Andrea Hazell	Liberal	Resigned to run for Mayor of Toronto, lost.	Yes
Kanata—Carleton	July 27, 2023	Merrilee Fullerton	Progressive Conservative	Karen McCrimmon	Liberal	Resigned.	No
Hamilton Centre	March 16, 2023	Andrea Horwath	New Democratic	Sarah Jama	New Democratic	Resigned to run for Mayor of Hamilton, elected.	Yes

== 42nd Legislative Assembly of Ontario 2018–2022 ==
By-election	Date	Incumbent	Party	Winner	Party	Cause	Retained
Ottawa—Vanier	February 27, 2020	Nathalie Des Rosiers	Liberal	Lucille Collard	Liberal	Resigned to become Principal of Massey College	Yes
Orléans	February 27, 2020	Marie-France Lalonde	Liberal	Stephen Blais	Liberal	Resigned to run in the federal district of Orléans; elected.	Yes

== 41st Legislative Assembly of Ontario 2014–2018 ==
By-election	Date	Incumbent	Party	Winner	Party	Cause	Retained
Sault Ste. Marie	June 1, 2017	David Orazietti	Liberal	Ross Romano	Progressive Conservative	Resignation.	No
Niagara West—Glanbrook	November 17, 2016	Tim Hudak	Progressive Conservative	Sam Oosterhoff	Progressive Conservative	Resignation to become CEO of Ontario Real Estate Association.	Yes
Ottawa—Vanier	November 17, 2016	Madeleine Meilleur	Liberal	Nathalie Des Rosiers	Liberal	Resignation.	Yes
Scarborough—Rouge River	September 1, 2016	Bas Balkissoon	Liberal	Raymond Cho	Progressive Conservative	Resignation.	No
Whitby—Oshawa	February 11, 2016	Christine Elliott	Progressive Conservative	Lorne Coe	Progressive Conservative	Resigned after losing leadership contest.	Yes
Simcoe North	September 3, 2015	Garfield Dunlop	Progressive Conservative	Patrick Brown	Progressive Conservative	Resignation to create a vacancy for PC leader Brown.	Yes
Sudbury	February 5, 2015	Joe Cimino	New Democratic	Glenn Thibeault	Liberal	Resignation.	No

== 40th Legislative Assembly of Ontario 2011–2014 ==
By-election	Date	Incumbent	Party	Winner	Party	Cause	Retained
Thornhill	February 13, 2014	Peter Shurman	Progressive Conservative	Gila Martow	Progressive Conservative	Resignation	Yes
Niagara Falls	February 13, 2014	Kim Craitor	Liberal	Wayne Gates	New Democratic	Resignation	No
Scarborough—Guildwood	August 1, 2013	Margarett Best	Liberal	Mitzie Hunter	Liberal	Resignation	Yes
Etobicoke—Lakeshore	August 1, 2013	Laurel Broten	Liberal	Doug Holyday	Progressive Conservative	Resignation	No
Ottawa South	August 1, 2013	Dalton McGuinty	Liberal	John Fraser	Liberal	Resignation to re-enter private life after retiring as Premier and Liberal leader.	Yes
Windsor—Tecumseh	August 1, 2013	Dwight Duncan	Liberal	Percy Hatfield	New Democratic	Resignation following the retirement of Premier McGuinty	No
London West	August 1, 2013	Chris Bentley	Liberal	Peggy Sattler	New Democratic	Resignation following the retirement of Premier McGuinty	No
Kitchener—Waterloo	September 6, 2012	Elizabeth Witmer	Progressive Conservative	Catherine Fife	New Democratic	Resignation to accept appointment as Chair of the Workplace Safety & Insurance Board	No
Vaughan	September 6, 2012	Greg Sorbara	Liberal	Steven Del Duca	Liberal	Resignation	Yes

== 39th Legislative Assembly of Ontario 2007–2011 ==
By-election	Date	Incumbent	Party	Winner	Party	Cause	Retained
Ottawa West—Nepean	March 4, 2010	Jim Watson	Liberal	Bob Chiarelli	Liberal	Resignation to run for Mayor of Ottawa	Yes
Leeds—Grenville	March 4, 2010	Robert Runciman	Progressive Conservative	Steve Clark	Progressive Conservative	Resignation upon appointment to Canadian Senate.	Yes
Toronto Centre	February 4, 2010	George Smitherman	Liberal	Glen Murray	Liberal	Resignation to run for Mayor of Toronto.	Yes
St. Paul's	September 17, 2009	Michael Bryant	Liberal	Eric Hoskins	Liberal	Resignation to accept municipal appointment.	Yes
Haliburton—Kawartha Lakes—Brock	March 5, 2009	Laurie Scott	Progressive Conservative	Rick Johnson	Liberal	Resignation to create vacancy for PC leader John Tory.	No

== 38th Legislative Assembly of Ontario 2003–2007 ==
By-election	Date	Incumbent	Party	Winner	Party	Cause	Retained
Burlington	February 8, 2007	Cam Jackson	Progressive Conservative	Joyce Savoline	Progressive Conservative	Resignation to run for Mayor of Burlington	Yes
York South—Weston	February 8, 2007	Joe Cordiano	Liberal	Paul Ferreira	New Democratic	Resignation	No
Markham	February 8, 2007	Tony Wong	Liberal	Michael Chan	Liberal	Resignation to run municipally.	Yes
Parkdale—High Park	September 14, 2006	Gerard Kennedy	Liberal	Cheri DiNovo	New Democratic	Resignation to seek federal Liberal leadership.	No
Whitby—Ajax	March 30, 2006	Jim Flaherty	Progressive Conservative	Christine Elliott	Progressive Conservative	Resignation to run federally.	Yes
Toronto—Danforth	March 26, 2006	Marilyn Churley	New Democratic	Peter Tabuns	New Democratic	Resignation to run federally.	Yes
Nepean—Carleton	March 26, 2006	John Baird	Progressive Conservative	Lisa MacLeod	Progressive Conservative	Resignation to run federally.	Yes
Scarborough—Rouge River	November 24, 2005	Alvin Curling	Liberal	Bas Balkissoon	Liberal	Resignation to accept diplomatic posting.	Yes
Dufferin—Peel—Wellington—Grey	March 17, 2005	Ernie Eves	Progressive Conservative	John Tory	Progressive Conservative	Resignation.	Yes
Hamilton East	May 13, 2004	Dominic Agostino	Liberal	Andrea Horwath	New Democratic	Death	No

== 37th Legislative Assembly of Ontario 1999–2003 ==
By-election	Date	Incumbent	Party	Winner	Party	Cause	Retained
Dufferin—Peel—Wellington—Grey	May 2, 2002	David Tilson	Progressive Conservative	Ernie Eves	Progressive Conservative	Resignation to create vacancy for PC leader and Premier Ernie Eves.	Yes
Nipissing	May 2, 2002	Mike Harris	Progressive Conservative	Al McDonald	Progressive Conservative	Resignation after retiring as Premier and party leader.	Yes
Beaches-East York	September 20, 2001	Frances Lankin	New Democratic	Michael Prue	New Democratic	Resignation to become CEO of United Way Toronto	Yes
Vaughan—King—Aurora	June 28, 2001	Al Palladini	Progressive Conservative	Greg Sorbara	Liberal	Death	No
Parry Sound—Muskoka	March 22, 2001	Ernie Eves	Progressive Conservative	Norm Miller	Progressive Conservative	Resignation	Yes
Wentworth-Burlington	September 7, 2000	Toni Skarica	Progressive Conservative	Ted McMeekin	Liberal	Resignation to protest municipal amalgamation.	No

== 36th Legislative Assembly of Ontario 1995–1999 ==
By-election	Date	Incumbent	Party	Winner	Party	Cause	Retained
Nickel Belt	October 1, 1998	Floyd Laughren	New Democratic	Blain Morin	New Democratic	Resignation to accept appointment as chair of Ontario Energy Board	Yes
Oriole	September 4, 1997	Elinor Caplan	Liberal	David Caplan	Liberal	Resignation to enter federal politics	Yes
Ottawa West	September 4, 1997	Bob Chiarelli	Liberal	Alex Cullen	Liberal	Resignation to run municipally	Yes
Windsor—Riverside	September 4, 1997	Dave Cooke	New Democratic	Wayne Lessard	New Democratic	Resignation to accept provincial appointment to the Education Improvement Commission.	Yes
York South	May 23, 1996	Bob Rae	New Democratic	Gerard Kennedy	Liberal	Resignation.	No

== 35th Legislative Assembly of Ontario 1990–1995 ==
By-election	Date	Incumbent	Party	Winner	Party	Cause	Retained
Victoria—Haliburton	March 17, 1994	Dennis Drainville	Independent	Chris Hodgson	Progressive Conservative	Resignation to run federally.	No
Essex South	December 2, 1993	Remo Mancini	Liberal	Bruce Crozier	Liberal	Resignation	Yes
St. George—St. David	April 1, 1993	Ian Scott	Liberal	Tim Murphy	Liberal	Resignation	Yes
Don Mills	April 1, 1993	Margery Ward	New Democratic	David Johnson	Progressive Conservative	Death	No
Brant—Haldimand	March 5, 1992	Robert Nixon	Liberal	Ronald Eddy	Liberal	Resignation to accept federal appointment.	Yes

== 34th Legislative Assembly of Ontario 1987–1990 ==
By-election	Date	Incumbent	Party	Winner	Party	Cause	Retained
Welland—Thorold	November 3, 1988	Mel Swart	New Democratic	Peter Kormos	New Democratic	Resignation.	Yes
London North	March 31, 1988	Ron Van Horne	Liberal	Dianne Cunningham	Progressive Conservative	Resignation.	No

== 33rd Legislative Assembly of Ontario 1985–1987 ==
By-election	Date	Incumbent	Party	Winner	Party	Cause	Retained
Cochrane North	August 14, 1986	René Fontaine	Liberal	René Fontaine	Liberal	Resignation from cabinet and legislature to resubmit candidacy to voters after it was revealed he had forgotten to disclose his ownership of shares in a mining company contrary to conflict of interest guidelines.	Yes
York East	April 17, 1986	Robert Elgie	Progressive Conservative	Christine Hart	Liberal	Resignation to accept appointment as head of Workers Compensation Board.	No

== 32nd Legislative Assembly of Ontario 1981–1985 ==
By-election	Date	Incumbent	Party	Winner	Party	Cause	Retained
Wentworth North	December 13, 1984	Eric Cunningham	Liberal	Ann Sloat	Progressive Conservative	Resignation to run federally.	No
Prescott and Russell	December 13, 1984	Don Boudria	Liberal	Jean Poirier	Liberal	Resignation to run federally.	Yes
Ottawa East	December 13, 1984	Albert J. Roy	Liberal	Bernard Grandmaître	Liberal	Resignation to run federally.	Yes
Ottawa Centre	December 13, 1984	Michael Cassidy	New Democratic	Evelyn Gigantes	New Democratic	Resignation to run federally.	Yes
Hamilton Centre	December 13, 1984	Sheila Copps	Liberal	Mike Davison	New Democratic	Resignation to run federally.	No
Stormont—Dundas—Glengarry	December 15, 1983	Osie Villeneuve	Progressive Conservative	Noble Villeneuve	Progressive Conservative	Death	Yes
York South	November 4, 1982	Donald C. MacDonald	New Democratic	Bob Rae	New Democratic	Resignation to create vacancy for NDP leader Bob Rae.	Yes
Hamilton West	June 17, 1982	Stuart Smith	Liberal	Richard Allen	New Democratic	Resignation from legislature after his successor as Liberal leader was chosen.	No

== 31st Legislative Assembly of Ontario 1977–1981 ==
By-election	Date	Incumbent	Party	Winner	Party	Cause	Retained
Carleton	November 20, 1980	Sid Handleman	Progressive Conservative	Robert C. Mitchell	Progressive Conservative	Resignation	Yes
Scarborough West	April 5, 1979	Stephen Lewis	New Democratic	Richard Johnston	New Democratic	Resignation several months after his successor as Ontario NDP leader was chosen.	Yes
Wentworth	April 5, 1979	Ian Deans	New Democratic	Colin Isaacs	New Democratic	Resignation after being defeated in his candidacy to lead the Ontario NDP.	Yes
Sault Ste. Marie	December 14, 1978	John Rhodes	Progressive Conservative	Russ Ramsay	Progressive Conservative	Death.	Yes
Chatham—Kent	October 19, 1978	Darcy McKeough	Progressive Conservative	Andrew Naismith Watson	Progressive Conservative	Resignation.	Yes

== 30th Legislative Assembly of Ontario 1975–1977 ==
no by-elections

== 29th Legislative Assembly of Ontario 1971–1975 ==
By-election	Date	Incumbent	Party	Winner	Party	Cause	Retained
Carleton East	November 7, 1974	Bert Lawrence	Progressive Conservative	Paul Frederick Taylor	Liberal	Resignation.	No
Stormont	October 17, 1974	Fernand Guindon	Progressive Conservative	George Samis	New Democratic	Resignation to run federally.	No
Huron	March 15, 1973	Charles MacNaughton	Progressive Conservative	Jack Riddell	Liberal	Resignation.	No
St. George	March 15, 1973	Allan Lawrence	Progressive Conservative	Margaret Campbell	Liberal	Resignation to enter federal politics.	No

== 28th Legislative Assembly of Ontario 1967–1971 ==
By-election	Date	Incumbent	Party	Winner	Party	Cause	Retained
Middlesex South	September 18, 1969	Neil Leverne Olde	Progressive Conservative	Kenneth Charles Bolton	New Democratic	Death.	No

== 27th Legislative Assembly of Ontario 1963–1967 ==
By-election	Date	Incumbent	Party	Winner	Party	Cause	Retained
Kenora	September 22, 1966	Robert Wayne Gibson	Liberal-Labour	Leo Bernier	Progressive Conservative	Death	No
Nipissing	September 15, 1965	Leo Troy	Liberal	Richard Smith	Liberal	Death	Yes
Bracondale	September 15, 1965	Joseph M. Gould	Liberal	George Ben	Liberal	Death	Yes
Riverdale	September 10, 1964	Robert Macaulay	Progressive Conservative	Jim Renwick	New Democratic	Resigned to return to private life	No
Windsor—Sandwich	September 10, 1964	Maurice Belanger	Liberal	Ivan Thrasher	Progressive Conservative	Death	No

== 26th Legislative Assembly of Ontario 1959–1963 ==
By-election	Date	Incumbent	Party	Winner	Party	Cause	Retained
Huron—Bruce	October 4, 1962	John William Hanna	Progressive Conservative	Murray Gaunt	Liberal	Death	No
Beaches	January 18, 1962	William Henry Collings	Progressive Conservative	Robert John Harris	Progressive Conservative	Death	Yes
Brant	January 18, 1962	Harry Nixon	Liberal	Robert Nixon	Liberal	Death	Yes
Eglinton	January 18, 1962	William James Dunlop	Progressive Conservative	Leonard Mackenzie Reilly	Progressive Conservative	Death	Yes
Kenora	January 18, 1962	Albert Wren	Liberal-Labour	Robert Wayne Gibson	Liberal	Death	Yes
Renfrew South	January 18, 1962	James Anthony Maloney	Progressive Conservative	Leonard Joseph Quilty	Liberal	Death	No
Simcoe Centre	September 29, 1960	George Graham Johnston	Progressive Conservative	David Arthur Evans	Progressive Conservative	Death	Yes
Timiskaming	September 29, 1960	Alexander Robert Herbert	Progressive Conservative	Phillip Hoffman	Progressive Conservative	Death	Yes

== 25th Legislative Assembly of Ontario 1955–1959 ==
By-election	Date	Incumbent	Party	Winner	Party	Cause	Retained
Hastings East	August 28, 1958†	Roscoe Robson	Progressive Conservative	Lloyd Harrison Price	Progressive Conservative	Appointed Sheriff	Yes
Lanark	August 28, 1958†	John Arthur McCue	Progressive Conservative	George Gomme	Progressive Conservative	Death	Yes
Cochrane North	May 12, 1958	Philip Timothy Kelly	Progressive Conservative	René Brunelle	Progressive Conservative	Resignation	Yes
Huron	May 12, 1958	Thomas Pryde	Progressive Conservative	Charles MacNaughton	Progressive Conservative	Death	Yes
Renfrew North	May 12, 1958	Stanley Joseph Hunt	Progressive Conservative	Maurice Hamilton	Progressive Conservative	Resigned to enter federal politics	Yes
St. George	May 12, 1958	Dana Porter	Progressive Conservative	Allan Lawrence	Progressive Conservative	Appointed Chief Justice of the Ontario Court of Appeal	Yes
Elgin	January 30, 1958	Fletcher Stewart Thomas	Progressive Conservative	Ron McNeil	Progressive Conservative	Death	Yes
Lanark	October 24, 1957	George Doucett	Progressive Conservative	John Arthur McCue	Progressive Conservative	Resigned to enter federal politics	Yes
Glengarry	September 5, 1957	Osie Villeneuve	Progressive Conservative	Fernand Guindon	Progressive Conservative	Resigned to enter federal politics	Yes
Middlesex North	September 5, 1957	Thomas L. Patrick	Progressive Conservative	William Atcheson Stewart	Progressive Conservative	Death	Yes
York West	October 18, 1956	W. Elmer Brandon	Progressive Conservative	Leslie Rowntree	Progressive Conservative	Death	Yes
Renfrew South	January 12, 1956	James Shannon Dempsey	Progressive Conservative	James Anthony Maloney	Progressive Conservative	Death	Yes

† Won by acclamation

== 24th Legislative Assembly of Ontario 1951–1955 ==
By-election	Date	Incumbent	Party	Winner	Party	Cause	Retained
Leeds	September 16, 1954	Charles Gordon MacOdrum	Progressive Conservative	James Auld	Progressive Conservative	Death	Yes
Nipissing	September 16, 1954	William Bruce Harvey	Progressive Conservative	Jean Marc Chaput	Progressive Conservative	Death	Yes
Russell	September 16, 1954	Joseph Daniel Nault	Progressive Conservative	Gordon Lavergne	Progressive Conservative	Death	Yes
Simcoe East	February 8, 1954	John Duncan McPhee	Progressive Conservative	Lloyd Averall Letherby	Progressive Conservative	Death	Yes
Niagara Falls	October 26, 1953	William Houck	Liberal	Arthur Connaught Jolley	Progressive Conservative	Resigned to enter federal politics	No

== 23rd Legislative Assembly of Ontario 1948–1951 ==
By-election	Date	Incumbent	Party	Winner	Party	Cause	Retained
Leeds	October 31, 1949	Walter Bain Reynolds	Progressive Conservative	Hugh Alexander Reynolds	Progressive Conservative	Death	Yes
Cochrane North	June 8, 1949	John Carrère	Progressive Conservative	Marcel Léger	Progressive Conservative	Death	Yes
Parry Sound	December 9, 1948	Charles Wilson Cragg	Progressive Conservative	Allister Johnston	Progressive Conservative	Death	Yes

== 22nd Legislative Assembly of Ontario 1945–1948 ==
By-election	Date	Incumbent	Party	Winner	Party	Cause	Retained
Huron	February 16, 1948	Robert Hobbs Taylor	Progressive Conservative	Thomas Pryde	Progressive Conservative	Death	Yes

== 21st Legislative Assembly of Ontario 1943–1945 ==
By-election	Date	Incumbent	Party	Winner	Party	Cause	Retained
Haldimand—Norfolk	March 20, 1944	Wallace William Walsh	Progressive Conservative	Charles Hammond Martin	Progressive Conservative	Death	Yes

== 20th Legislative Assembly of Ontario 1937–1943 ==
By-election	Date	Incumbent	Party	Winner	Party	Cause	Retained
Grey South	February 24, 1941†	Farquhar Oliver	United Farmers of Ontario	Farquhar Oliver	Liberal	Sought re-election upon appointment as Minister of Public Works	No
Ottawa East	November 27, 1940	Paul Leduc	Liberal	Robert Laurier	Liberal	Resignation	Yes
Simcoe Centre	October 23, 1940†	Leonard Jennett Simpson	Liberal	Duncan McArthur	Liberal	Death	Yes
Simcoe East	February 14, 1939†	William Finlayson	Conservative	George A. Drew	Conservative	Resignation to provide a seat for Conservative leader Drew	Yes
Parkdale	October 5, 1938	Fred McBrien	Conservative	William James Stewart	Conservative	Death	Yes
Waterloo South	September 28, 1938†	Norman Hipel	Liberal	Norman Hipel	Liberal	Sought re-election upon appointment as Minister of Labour	Yes
Brantford	July 20, 1938	Morrison Mann MacBride	Independent-Liberal*	Louis Hagey	Liberal	Death	Yes
Lambton East	March 22, 1938	Milton Duncan McVicar	Liberal	Charles Oliver Fairbank	Liberal	Death	Yes
Hamilton Centre	March 2, 1938	William Frederick Schwenger	Liberal	John Newlands	Liberal	Resigned to become a judge	Yes
Sault Ste. Marie	November 23, 1937†	Richard McMeekin	Liberal	Colin Campbell	Liberal	Resignation to provide a seat for Campbell	Yes

† Won by acclamation

*Though nominally an "Independent-Liberal", MacBride was a supporter of the Liberal government and was a cabinet minister at the time of his death

== 19th Legislative Assembly of Ontario 1934–1937 ==
By-election	Date	Incumbent	Party	Winner	Party	Cause	Retained
Hastings East	December 9, 1936	James Ferguson Hill	Conservative	Harold Edward Welsh	Conservative	Death	Yes
Nipissing	March 4, 1935	Théodore Legault	Liberal	Joseph Marceau	Liberal	Death	Yes
Grey North	August 20, 1934	David James Taylor	Liberal-Progressive	Roland Patterson	Liberal-Progressive	Resigned to accept appointment as Deputy Minister of Game and Fisheries	Yes
Wellington South	August 20, 1934	Duncan Paul Munro	Liberal	James Harold King	Liberal	Death	Yes
Kenora	August 7, 1934†	Earl Hutchinson	Labour	Peter Heenan	Liberal	Resigned to become vice-chairman of Workmen's Compensation Board	No

† Won by acclamation

== 18th Legislative Assembly of Ontario 1929–1934 ==
By-election	Date	Incumbent	Party	Winner	Party	Cause	Retained
Kent East	January 3, 1934†	Philip James Henry	Conservative	Douglas Munro Campbell	Liberal	Death	No
York West	May 28, 1932	Forbes Godfrey	Conservative	Henry Isaac Price	Conservative	Death	Yes
Wellington South	November 18, 1931	Lincoln Goldie	Conservative	Duncan Paul Munro	Liberal	Died	No
Dundas	August 29, 1931†	George Holmes Challies	Conservative	George Holmes Challies	Conservative	Sought re-election upon appointment as Provincial Secretary and Registrar	Yes
Norfolk	July 8, 1931	John Strickler Martin	Conservative	Arthur Campbell Burt	Conservative	Death	Yes
Grenville	February 11, 1931	Howard Ferguson	Conservative	James Alfred Sanderson	Conservative	Resigned to accept appointment as Canadian High Commissioner to the United Kingdom	Yes
Hamilton West	February 11, 1931	Frederick Thomas Smye	Conservative	D'Arcy Argue Counsell Martin	Conservative	Death	Yes
Lanark South	October 29, 1930	James Alexander Anderson	Conservative	Egerton Reuben Stedman	Conservative	Death	Yes
Nipissing	October 29, 1930	Henri Morel	Conservative	Charles Robert Harrison	Conservative	Resigned to run in the 1930 federal election	Yes
Perth South	October 29, 1930	David Bonis	Conservative	Charles Edward Richardson	Conservative	Death	Yes
Waterloo South	October 29, 1930	Karl Kenneth Homuth	Conservative	Norman Hipel	Liberal	Resigned to run in the 1930 federal election	No
Algoma	October 18, 1930†	John Morrow Robb	Conservative	John Morrow Robb	Conservative	Sought re-election upon appointment as Minister of Health	Yes
Brantford	October 18, 1930†	William George Martin	Conservative	William George Martin	Conservative	Sought re-election upon appointment as Minister of Public Welfare	Yes
Peel	October 18, 1930†	Thomas Laird Kennedy	Conservative	Thomas Laird Kennedy	Conservative	Sought re-election upon appointment as Minister of Agriculture	Yes
Renfrew North	October 18, 1930†	Edward Arunah Dunlop	Conservative	Edward Arunah Dunlop	Conservative	Sought re-election upon appointment as Provincial Treasurer	Yes
York South	October 18, 1930†	Leopold Macaulay	Conservative	Leopold Macaulay	Conservative	Sought re-election upon appointment as Provincial Secretary and Registrar	Yes

† Won by acclamation

== 17th Legislative Assembly of Ontario 1926–1929 ==
By-election	Date	Incumbent	Party	Winner	Party	Cause	Retained
Renfrew North	June 27, 1928	Alexander Stuart	Conservative	Edward Arunah Dunlop	Conservative	Death	Yes
Bruce South	June 27, 1928	Malcolm Alex McCallum	Progressive	Foster Graham Moffatt	Conservative	Election declared void	No
Hamilton East	June 27, 1928	Leeming Carr	Conservative	William Robert Morrison	Conservative	Resigned to accept appointment as Sheriff of Wellington County	Yes
Prince Edward	November 1, 1927†	William Raney	United Farmers of Ontario	Horace Stanley Colliver	Conservative	Appointed to Supreme Court of Ontario	No

† Won by acclamation

== 16th Legislative Assembly of Ontario 1923–1926 ==
By-election	Date	Incumbent	Party	Winner	Party	Cause	Retained
Toronto Northwest A	July 7, 1924	Thomas Crawford	Conservative	William Henry Edwards	Conservative	Resigned to accept appointment as Registrar	Yes
Waterloo South	June 23, 1924	Karl Kenneth Homuth	Labour	Karl Kenneth Homuth	Labour	Election declared void	Yes
Lennox	October 22, 1923	John Perry Vrooman	Liberal	Charles Wesley Hambly	Conservative	Death	No
York West	August 16, 1923†	Forbes Godfrey	Conservative	Forbes Godfrey	Conservative	Sought re-election upon appointment as Minister of Labour	Yes
York East	August 16, 1923†	George Stewart Henry	Conservative	George Stewart Henry	Conservative	Sought re-election upon appointment as Minister of Public Works and Highways	Yes
Wellington South	August 16, 1923†	Lincoln Goldie	Conservative	Lincoln Goldie	Conservative	Sought re-election upon appointment as Provincial Secretary and Registrar	Yes
Sudbury	August 16, 1923†	Charles McCrea	Conservative	Charles McCrea	Conservative	Sought re-election upon appointment as Minister of Mines	Yes
Sault Ste. Marie	August 16, 1923†	James Winfield Lyons	Conservative	James Winfield Lyons	Conservative	Sought re-election upon appointment as Minister of Lands and Forests	Yes
Parkdale	August 16, 1923†	William Herbert Price	Conservative	William Herbert Price	Conservative	Sought re-election upon appointment as Provincial Treasurer	Yes
Norfolk South	August 16, 1923†	John Strickler Martin	Conservative	John Strickler Martin	Conservative	Sought re-election upon appointment as Minister of Agriculture	Yes
Kingston	August 16, 1923†	William Folger Nickle	Conservative	William Folger Nickle	Conservative	Sought re-election upon appointment as Attorney-General	Yes
Grenville	August 16, 1923†	George Howard Ferguson	Conservative	George Howard Ferguson	Conservative	Sought re-election upon appointment as Premier and Minister of Education	Yes

† Won by acclamation

== 15th Legislative Assembly of Ontario 1919–1923 ==
By-election	Date	Incumbent	Party	Winner	Party	Cause	Retained
Russell	October 23, 1922	Damase Racine	Liberal	Alfred Goulet	Liberal	Death	Yes
Toronto Southeast A	October 23, 1922	John O'Neill	Liberal	John Allister Currie	Conservative	Death	No
Kingston	February 6, 1922	Arthur Edward Ross	Conservative	William Folger Nickle	Conservative	Resigned to run in the 1921 federal election	Yes
Oxford North	December 19, 1921	John Alexander Calder	Liberal	David Munroe Ross	United Farmers of Ontario	Death	No
Toronto Northeast A	November 8, 1920	Henry John Cody	Conservative	Alexander Cameron Lewis	Conservative	Resignation	Yes
Fort William	July 19, 1920†	Harry Mills	Labour	Harry Mills	Labour	Sought re-election upon appointment as Minister of Mines	Yes
Wellington East	February 23, 1920†	Albert Hellyer	United Farmers of Ontario	William Raney	United Farmers of Ontario	Resignation to provide a seat for Raney	Yes
Halton	February 16, 1920	John Featherstone Ford	United Farmers of Ontario	Ernest Charles Drury	United Farmers of Ontario	Resignation to provide a seat for Drury	Yes
Kent East	February 9, 1920†	James B. Clark	United Farmers of Ontario	Manning Doherty	United Farmers of Ontario	Resignation to provide a seat for Doherty	Yes
Brant North	December 15, 1919†	Harry Nixon	United Farmers of Ontario	Harry Nixon	United Farmers of Ontario	Sought re-election upon appointment as Provincial Secretary and Registrar	Yes
Wentworth North	December 15, 1919†	Frank Campbell Biggs	United Farmers of Ontario	Frank Campbell Biggs	United Farmers of Ontario	Sought re-election upon appointment as Minister of Public Works and Highways	Yes
Perth South	December 15, 1919†	Peter Smith	United Farmers of Ontario	Peter Smith	United Farmers of Ontario	Sought re-election upon appointment as Provincial Treasurer	Yes
Manitoulin	December 15, 1919†	Beniah Bowman	United Farmers of Ontario	Beniah Bowman	United Farmers of Ontario	Sought re-election upon appointment as Minister of Lands, Forests and Mines	Yes
Hamilton West	December 15, 1919†	Walter Rollo	Labour	Walter Rollo	Labour	Sought re-election upon appointment as Minister of Labour	Yes
Carleton	December 15, 1919†	Robert Henry Grant	United Farmers of Ontario	Robert Henry Grant	United Farmers of Ontario	Sought re-election upon appointment as Minister of Education	Yes

† Won by acclamation

== 14th Legislative Assembly of Ontario 1914–1919 ==
By-election	Date	Incumbent	Party	Winner	Party	Cause	Retained
Ontario North	February 18, 1919	William Hoyle	Conservative	John Wesley Widdifield	United Farmers of Ontario	Death	No
St. Catharines	February 15, 1919	Elisha Jessop	Conservative	Frederick Raymond Parnell	Conservative	Death	Yes
Huron North	December 2, 1918	Armstrong Musgrove	Conservative	William Henry Fraser	Independent	Resignation upon appointment as Postmaster of Wingham	No
Toronto Northeast A	December 2, 1918	Robert Allan Pyne	Conservative	Henry John Cody	Conservative	Resigned to accept position as Clerk of York County.	Yes
Manitoulin	October 24, 1918	Robert Roswell Gamey	Conservative	Beniah Bowman	United Farmers of Ontario	Death	No
Lennox	August 29, 1918†	Thomas George Carscallen	Conservative	Reginald Amherst Fowler	Conservative	Death	Yes
Oxford North	August 19, 1918†	Newton Wesley Rowell	Liberal	John Alexander Calder	Liberal	Resigned to run in the 1917 federal election.	Yes
York East	August 19, 1918	George Stewart Henry	Conservative	George Stewart Henry	Conservative	Sought re-election upon appointment as Minister of Agriculture	Yes
Toronto Northwest B	January 22, 1917	William David McPherson	Conservative	William David McPherson	Conservative	Sought re-election upon appointment as Provincial Secretary and Registrar	Yes
Simcoe West	January 15, 1917†	James Stoddart Duff	Conservative	William Torrance Allen	Conservative	Death	Yes
Toronto Southwest A	August 21, 1916	James Joseph Foy	Conservative	Hartley Dewart	Liberal	Death	No
Perth North	July 10, 1916	James Torrance	Conservative	Wellington Hay	Liberal	Appointed Registrar	No
Muskoka	June 12, 1916†	Samuel Henry Armstrong	Conservative	George Walter Ecclestone	Conservative	Death	Yes
Peel	February 24, 1916	James Robinson Fallis	Conservative	William James Lowe	Liberal	Resignation	No
Algoma	October 25, 1915†	Albert Grigg	Conservative	John Morrow Robb	Conservative	Resignation upon appointment as Deputy Minister of Crown Lands	Yes
Grenville	January 7, 1915†	George Howard Ferguson	Conservative	George Howard Ferguson	Conservative	Sought re-election upon appointment as Minister of Lands, Forests and Mines	Yes
Renfrew South	January 7, 1915†	Thomas William McGarry	Conservative	Thomas William McGarry	Conservative	Sought re-election upon appointment as Provincial Treasurer	Yes
Dundas	December 7, 1914	Sir James Whitney	Conservative	Irwin Foster Hilliard	Conservative	Death	Yes
Hamilton West	November 18, 1914	John Strathearn Hendrie	Conservative	John Allan	Conservative	Appointed Lieutenant Governor of Ontario	Yes
Elgin West	October 21, 1914†	Findlay George MacDiarmid	Conservative	Findlay George MacDiarmid	Conservative	Sought re-election upon appointment as Minister of Public Works	Yes

† Won by acclamation

== 13th Legislative Assembly of Ontario 1911–1914 ==
By-election	Date	Incumbent	Party	Winner	Party	Cause	Retained
Middlesex East	November 27, 1913	George Wesley Neely	Conservative	John McFarlan	Conservative	Death	Yes
Peel	November 3, 1913	Samuel Charters	Conservative	James Robinson Fallis	Conservative	Appointed Registrar	Yes
York East	September 8, 1913	Alexander McCowan	Conservative	George Stewart Henry	Conservative	Appointed Sheriff of York County	Yes
Grey North	July 14, 1913	Alexander Grant MacKay	Liberal	Colin Stewart Cameron	Conservative	Resignation upon entering provincial politics in Alberta	No
Grey Centre	June 2, 1913†	Isaac Benson Lucas	Conservative	Isaac Benson Lucas	Conservative	Sought re-election upon appointment as Provincial Treasurer	Yes
Lanark South	March 19, 1913	Arthur Matheson	Conservative	John Charles Ebbs	Conservative	Death	Yes
Muskoka	November 5, 1912†	Arthur Arnold Mahaffy	Conservative	Samuel Henry Armstrong	Conservative	Appointed a Judge	Yes
Waterloo North	October 28, 1912	Henry George Lackner	Conservative	Charles Henry Mills	Conservative	Appointed Sheriff of Waterloo County	Yes
Middlesex East	October 28, 1912	Robert Sutherland	Liberal	George Wesley Neely	Conservative	Death	No

† Won by acclamation

== 12th Legislative Assembly of Ontario 1908–1911 ==
By-election	Date	Incumbent	Party	Winner	Party	Cause	Retained
Wellington South	October 21, 1910†	Joseph Patrick Downey	Conservative	John Ransom Howitt	Conservative	Appointed Superintendent for the Ontario Asylum for Idiots	Yes
Middlesex North	December 6, 1909	Duncan Campbell Ross	Liberal	James William Doyle	Conservative	Resignation to enter federal politics	No
Victoria East	May 25, 1909	John Hilliard Carnegie	Conservative	Robert Mercer Mason	Conservative	Resignation upon appointment as Distributor of Law Stamps	Yes
Algoma	December 17, 1908†	William Ross Smyth	Conservative	Albert Grigg	Conservative	Resignation to enter federal politics	Yes
Simcoe West	October 23, 1908†	James Stoddart Duff	Conservative	James Stoddart Duff	Conservative	Sought re-election upon appointment as Minister of Agriculture	Yes

† Won by acclamation

== 11th Legislative Assembly of Ontario 1905–1908 ==
By-election	Date	Incumbent	Party	Winner	Party	Cause	Retained
Brockville	October 7, 1907	George Perry Graham	Liberal	Albert Edward Donovan	Conservative	Resignation on entering federal politics	No
Dufferin	July 24, 1907	Frederick William Lewis	Conservative	Charles Robert McKeown	Conservative	Death	Yes
York West	June 1, 1907	Joseph Wesley St. John	Conservative	Forbes Godfrey	Conservative	Death	Yes
Carleton	March 18, 1907	George Nelson Kidd	Conservative	Robert McElroy	Conservative	Death	Yes
Middlesex West	February 20, 1907	George William Ross	Liberal	Duncan Campbell Ross	Liberal	Appointed to the Senate	Yes
Hamilton East	December 4, 1906	Henry Carscallen	Conservative	Allan Studholme	Labour	Death	No
Cardwell	September 21, 1906†	Edward Alfred Little	Conservative	Alexander Ferguson	Conservative	Appointed Registrar	Yes
Toronto North	February 22, 1906	William Beattie Nesbitt	Conservative	William Kirkpatrick McNaught	Conservative	Appointed registrar of West Toronto	Yes
Kingston	January 29, 1906	Edward John Barker Pense	Liberal	Edward John Barker Pense	Liberal	Election declared void	Yes
Nipissing East	June 13, 1905†	Charles Lamarche	Conservative	Francis Cochrane	Conservative	Resignation to provide a seat for Cochrane	Yes
Toronto South	February 21, 1905†	James Joseph Foy	Conservative	James Joseph Foy	Conservative	Sought re-election upon appointment as Commissioner of Crown Lands	Yes
Toronto East	February 21, 1905†	Robert Allan Pyne	Conservative	Robert Allan Pyne	Conservative	Sought re-election upon appointment as Minister of Education	Yes
Perth South	February 21, 1905†	Samuel Nelson Monteith	Conservative	Samuel Nelson Monteith	Conservative	Sought re-election upon appointment as Minister of Agriculture	Yes
Lanark South	February 21, 1905†	Arthur James Matheson	Conservative	Arthur James Matheson	Conservative	Sought re-election upon appointment as Provincial Treasurer	Yes
Lambton West	February 21, 1905†	William John Hanna	Conservative	William John Hanna	Conservative	Sought re-election upon appointment as Provincial Secretary and Registrar	Yes
Essex North	February 21, 1905†	Joseph Octave Reaume	Conservative	Joseph Octave Reaume	Conservative	Sought re-election upon appointment as Commissioner of Public Works	Yes
Dundas	February 21, 1905†	James Pliny Whitney	Conservative	James Pliny Whitney	Conservative	Sought re-election upon appointment as Premier and Attorney-General	Yes

† Won by acclamation

== 10th Legislative Assembly of Ontario 1902–1904 ==
By-election	Date	Incumbent	Party	Winner	Party	Cause	Retained
Oxford North	January 26, 1904	Andrew Pattulo	Liberal	James S. Munro	Liberal	Death	Yes
Renfrew North	December 26, 1903	John W. Munro	Liberal	Edward Arunah Dunlop	Conservative	Death	No
Sault Ste. Marie	October 27, 1903	Andrew Miscampbell	Conservative	Charles Napier Smith	Liberal	Void Election	No
Muskoka	October 27, 1903	Samuel Bridgeland	Liberal	Arthur Arnold Mahaffy	Conservative	Death	No
York North	February 26, 1903	Elihu James Davis	Liberal	Elihu James Davis	Liberal	Resignation in exchange for withdrawal of election petition	Yes
Bruce Centre	February 26, 1903	Hugh Clark	Conservative	Hugh Clark	Conservative	Void Election	Yes
Perth North	January 7, 1903	John C. Monteith	Conservative	John Brown	Liberal	Void Election	No
Norfolk North	January 7, 1903	Frederick Snider	Conservative	Archibald Little	Liberal	Void Election	No
Grey North	January 7, 1903	Alexander Grant MacKay	Liberal	Alexander Grant MacKay	Liberal	Void Election	Yes

== 9th Legislative Assembly of Ontario 1898–1902 ==
By-election	Date	Incumbent	Party	Winner	Party	Cause	Retained
Kingston	January 30, 1902†	William Harty	Liberal	Edward John Barker Pense	Liberal	Resignation to enter federal politics	Yes
Huron West	December 4, 1901	James Thompson Garrow	Liberal	James Thompson Garrow	Liberal	Void Election	Yes
Kent East	November 4, 1901†	Robert Ferguson	Liberal	John Lee	Liberal	Death	Yes
London	July 9, 1901	Francis Baxter Leys	Liberal	Francis Baxter Leys	Liberal	Sought re-election in support of removing a dam on the Thames River	Yes
Welland	December 13, 1900	William Manley German	Liberal	John Franklin Gross	Liberal	Resignation to enter federal politics	Yes
Waterloo North	October 31, 1900†	Louis Jacob Breithaupt	Liberal	Louis Jacob Breithaupt	Liberal	Void Election	Yes
Renfrew North	June 19, 1900†	Andrew Thomas White	Conservative	John W. Munro	Liberal	Death	No
Middlesex East	January 31, 1900	Thomas D. Hodgins	Conservative	Thomas Robson	Conservative	Death	Yes
Brant South	December 12, 1899	Arthur Sturgis Hardy	Liberal	Thomas Hiram Preston	Liberal	Resignation	Yes
Elgin East	December 12, 1899	Charles Andrew Brower	Conservative	Charles Andrew Brower	Conservative	Void Election	Yes
Elgin West	December 12, 1899	Donald Macnish	Liberal	Findlay George MacDiarmid	Conservative	Void Election	No
Ontario South	December 12, 1899	John Dryden	Liberal	John Dryden	Liberal	Void Election	Yes
Renfrew South	November 14, 1899	Robert Adam Campbell	Liberal	Francis Robert Latchford	Liberal	Resignation to provide a seat for Latchford	Yes
Peterborough West	November 7, 1899†	James Robert Stratton	Liberal	James Robert Stratton	Liberal	Sought re-election upon appointment as Provincial Secretary and Registrar	Yes
Waterloo North	May 23, 1899	Henry George Lackner	Conservative	Louis Jacob Breithaupt	Liberal	Void Election	No
Perth South	February 28, 1899	William Caven Moscrip	Liberal	Samuel Nelson Monteith	Conservative	Void Election	No
Elgin West	January 12, 1899	Findlay George MacDiarmid	Conservative	Donald Macnish	Liberal	Void Election	No
Hastings North	December 27, 1898	William John Allen	Conservative	William John Allen	Conservative	Resignation in exchange for withdrawal of election petition	Yes
Nipissing	December 27, 1898	John Loughrin	Liberal	John Loughrin	Liberal	Void Election	Yes
Northumberland East	December 14, 1898	John Henry Douglas	Liberal	John Henry Douglas	Liberal	Void Election	Yes
Halton	December 8, 1898	John Roaf Barber	Liberal	John Roaf Barber	Liberal	Void Election	Yes
Huron West	December 8, 1898	James Thompson Garrow	Liberal	James Thompson Garrow	Liberal	Void Election	Yes
Lennox	November 18, 1898	Bowen Ebenezer Aylsworth	Liberal	Bowen Ebenezer Aylsworth	Liberal	Void Election	Yes
Ontario South	November 1, 1898	Charles Calder	Conservative	John Dryden	Liberal	Void Election	No
Wellington East	October 27, 1898	John Craig	Liberal	John Morison Gibson	Liberal	Death	Yes

† Won by acclamation

== 8th Legislative Assembly of Ontario 1894–1898 ==
By-election	Date	Incumbent	Party	Winner	Party	Cause	Retained
Essex South	October 20, 1896	William Douglas Balfour	Liberal	John Allan Auld	Liberal	Death	Yes
York North	September 8, 1896†	Elihu James Davis	Liberal	Elihu James Davis	Liberal	Sought re-election upon appointment as Provincial Secretary and Registrar	Yes
Oxford North	September 7, 1896	Oliver Mowat	Liberal	Andrew Pattulo	Liberal	Appointed to the Senate	Yes
Essex South	August 4, 1896†	William Douglas Balfour	Liberal	William Douglas Balfour	Liberal	Sought re-election upon appointment as Provincial Secretary and Registrar	Yes
Wentworth South	January 24, 1896	Nicholas Awrey	Liberal	John Dickenson	Liberal	Appointed Sheriff of Wentworth County	Yes
Wellington West	January 24, 1896	George Tucker	Conservative-PPA	James Tucker	Conservative	Void Election	Yes
Kingston	October 8, 1895†	William Harty	Liberal	William Harty	Liberal	Void Election	Yes
Brant North	May 20, 1895†	William Bruce Wood	Liberal	Daniel Burt	Liberal	Resignation	Yes
Haldimand	March 19, 1895	John Senn	Conservative	Jacob Baxter	Liberal	Void Election	No
Algoma West	January 29, 1895	James M. Savage	Conservative	James Conmee	Liberal	Void Election	No
Kingston	January 28, 1895	Edward H. Smythe	Conservative	William Harty	Liberal	Void Election	No
London	November 20, 1894	William Ralph Meredith	Conservative	Thomas Saunders Hobbs	Liberal	Appointed a judge	No

† Won by acclamation

== 7th Legislative Assembly of Ontario 1890–1894 ==
By-election	Date	Incumbent	Party	Winner	Party	Cause	Retained
Lanark South	February 16, 1894	Nathaniel McLenaghan	Conservative	James Maitland Clarke	Liberal	Resignation	No
Lambton East	December 2, 1893	Hugh McKenzie	Liberal	Peter Duncan McCallum	Independent Conservative	Death	No
Bruce North	December 2, 1893	David Porter	Liberal	Daniel McNaughton	Liberal	Death	Yes
Toronto	February 28, 1893	Nelson Gordon Bigelow	Liberal	George Ryerson	Conservative	Death	No
Peel	December 30, 1892	Kenneth Chisholm	Liberal	John Smith	Liberal	Appointed Registrar for Peel County	Yes
Toronto	April 29, 1892	Henry Edward Clarke	Conservative	Nelson Gordon Bigelow	Liberal	Death	No
Renfrew North	February 29, 1892	Arunah Dunlop	Conservative	Henry Barr	Liberal	Death	No
Kingston	February 29, 1892	James Henry Metcalfe	Conservative	William Harty	Liberal	Resignation to enter federal politics	No
Wellington East	November 10, 1891	Charles Clarke	Liberal	James Kirkwood	Liberal	Appointed Clerk of the House	Yes
Grey South	April 2, 1891†	James Hill Hunter	Liberal	Gilbert McKechnie	Liberal	Death	Yes
Bruce North	March 3, 1891	John George	Conservative	David Porter	Liberal	Void Election	No
Hamilton	February 24, 1891	Thomas Henry Stinson	Conservative	John Morison Gibson	Liberal	Void Election	No
Perth North	January 23, 1891	Alfred Emanuel Ahrens	Liberal	Thomas Magwood	Conservative	Void Election	No
Norfolk South	January 23, 1891	William Andrew Charlton	Liberal	William Andrew Charlton	Liberal	Void Election	Yes
Norfolk North	January 23, 1891	John Bailey Freeman	Liberal	Edwin Clarendon Carpenter	Liberal	Death	Yes
Durham East	January 23, 1891	George Campbell	Conservative-Equal Rights	George Campbell	Conservative-Equal Rights	Void Election	Yes
Ontario South	September 30, 1890†	John Dryden	Liberal	John Dryden	Liberal	Sought re-election upon appointment as Commissioner of Agriculture	Yes
Monck	September 30, 1890†	Richard Harcourt	Liberal	Richard Harcourt	Liberal	Sought re-election upon appointment as Provincial Treasurer	Yes

† Won by acclamation

== 6th Legislative Assembly of Ontario 1886–1890 ==
By-election	Date	Incumbent	Party	Winner	Party	Cause	Retained
Lambton West	October 19, 1889†	Timothy Blair Pardee	Liberal	Charles MacKenzie	Liberal	Death	Yes
Hamilton	January 31, 1889†	John Morison Gibson	Liberal	John Morison Gibson	Liberal	Sought re-election upon appointment as Provincial Secretary and Registrar	Yes
Northumberland East	October 11, 1888	Richard Clarke	Liberal	William Arnson Willoughby	Conservative	Death	No
Frontenac	October 11, 1888	Henry Wilmot	Conservative	Hugh Smith	Conservative	Death	Yes
Elgin East	October 11, 1888	Thomas McIntyre Nairn	Liberal	James Charles Dance	Liberal	Death	Yes
Lanark North	October 4, 1888†	Daniel Hilliard	Liberal	William Clyde Caldwell	Liberal	Death	Yes
York North	May 23, 1888†	Joseph Henry Widdifield	Liberal	Elihu James Davis	Liberal	Resignation	Yes
Simcoe East	May 16, 1888†	Charles Alfred Drury	Liberal	Charles Alfred Drury	Liberal	Sought re-election upon appointment as Commissioner of Agriculture	Yes
Northumberland East	February 1, 1888	William Arnson Willoughby	Conservative	Richard Clarke	Liberal	Void Election	No
Dundas	January 31, 1888	Theodore F. Chamberlain	Liberal	James Pliny Whitney	Conservative	Void Election	No

† Won by acclamation

== 5th Legislative Assembly of Ontario 1883–1886 ==
By-election	Date	Incumbent	Party	Winner	Party	Cause	Retained
Algoma East	June 29, 1885	New Seat		Robert Adam Lyon	Liberal	Algoma divided	N/A
Simcoe East	June 26, 1885	Charles Alfred Drury	Liberal	Charles Alfred Drury	Liberal	Void Election	Yes
Lennox	June 26, 1885	George Douglas Hawley	Liberal	George Douglas Hawley	Liberal	Void Election	Yes
Algoma West	June 26, 1885	New Seat		James Conmee	Liberal	Algoma divided	N/A
Kent East	June 19, 1885†	Daniel McCraney	Liberal	Robert Ferguson	Liberal	Death	Yes
Renfrew South	January 27, 1885	John Francis Dowling	Liberal	John Francis Dowling	Liberal	Void Election	Yes
Lennox	August 28, 1884	Alexander Hall Roe	Conservative	George Douglas Hawley	Liberal	Death	No
Muskoka and Parry Sound	July 23, 1884	Frederick G. Fauquier	Conservative	Jacob William Dill	Liberal	Void Election	No
Grey East	March 18, 1884	Abram William Lauder	Conservative	Neil McColman	Conservative	Death	Yes
Oxford South	March 5, 1884	Adam Crooks	Liberal	George Atwell Cooke	Liberal	Crooks declared "incurably insane" and seat vacated	Yes
Renfrew South	January 18, 1884	John Francis Dowling	Liberal	John Francis Dowling	Liberal	Void Election	Yes
Simcoe West	December 14, 1883	Orson James Phelps	Liberal	Orson James Phelps	Liberal	Void Election	Yes
Middlesex West	December 14, 1883	Alexander Johnston	Conservative	George William Ross	Liberal	Void Election	No
Cardwell	December 14, 1883	William Henry Hammell	Conservative	William Henry Hammell	Conservative	Void Election	Yes
Huron West	November 16, 1883†	Alexander McLagan Ross	Liberal	Alexander McLagan Ross	Liberal	Sought re-election upon appointment as Provincial Treasurer and Commissioner of Agriculture	Yes
Brant North	June 16, 1883	James Young	Liberal	James Young	Liberal	Sought re-election upon appointment as Provincial Treasurer and Commissioner of Agriculture	Yes

† Won by acclamation

== 4th Legislative Assembly of Ontario 1879–1883 ==
By-election	Date	Incumbent	Party	Winner	Party	Cause	Retained
Muskoka and Parry Sound	October 30, 1882	John Classon Miller	Liberal	James Whitney Bettes	Liberal	Resignation to contest the 1882 federal election	Yes
Waterloo South	October 18, 1882	James Livingston	Liberal	Isaac Master	Liberal	Resignation to contest the 1882 federal election	Yes
Simcoe East	October 18, 1882	Herman Henry Cook	Liberal	Charles Alfred Drury	Liberal	Resignation to contest the 1882 federal election	Yes
Renfrew North	October 18, 1882†	Thomas Murray	Liberal	William Balmer McAllister	Conservative	Resignation to contest the 1882 federal election	Yes*
Hastings West	October 18, 1882	Alexander Robertson	Conservative	Baltis Rose	Conservative	Resignation to contest the 1882 federal election	Yes
Glengarry	October 18, 1882	Donald Macmaster	Conservative	James Rayside	Liberal	Resignation to contest the 1882 federal election	No
Essex South	October 18, 1882	Lewis Wigle	Conservative	William Douglas Balfour	Liberal	Resignation to contest the 1882 federal election	No
Bruce South	October 18, 1882	Rupert Mearse Wells	Liberal	Hamilton Parke O'Connor	Liberal	Resignation to contest the 1882 federal election	Yes
Peterborough West	August 24, 1881†	William Hepburn Scott	Conservative	Robert Kincaid	Conservative	Death	Yes
Durham East	June 29, 1881	John Rosevear	Conservative	Charles Herbert Brereton	Conservative	Death	Yes
Waterloo North	June 27, 1881	Moses Springer	Liberal	Elias Weber Bingeman Snider	Liberal	Resignation to become Sheriff of Waterloo County	Yes
Ontario North	June 4, 1881	Thomas Paxton	Liberal	Frank Madill	Conservative	Resignation to become Sheriff of Ontario County	No
Prescott	April 14, 1881	William Harkin	Conservative	Albert Hagar	Liberal	Death	No
Hastings West	January 30, 1880	Alexander Robertson	Conservative	Alexander Robertson	Conservative	Void Election	Yes
Stormont	January 23, 1880	Joseph Kerr	Conservative	Joseph Kerr	Conservative	Void Election	Yes
Dufferin	January 9, 1880	John Barr	Conservative	William Jelly	Conservative	Void Election	Yes

† Won by acclamation

*McAllister was a supporter of Mowat's government

== 3rd Legislative Assembly of Ontario 1875–1879 ==
By-election	Date	Incumbent	Party	Winner	Party	Cause	Retained
Toronto East	December 21, 1878	Matthew Crooks Cameron	Conservative	Alexander Morris	Conservative	Appointed a judge	Yes
Monck	December 21, 1878	Henry Ryan Haney	Liberal	Richard Harcourt	Liberal	Death	Yes
Simcoe South	October 29, 1878	William McDougall	Independent Liberal	William James Parkhill	Conservative	Resignation to contest the 1878 federal election	No
Essex North	October 29, 1878	James Colebrooke Patterson	Conservative	Solomon White	Conservative	Resignation to contest the 1878 federal election	Yes
Elgin West	October 29, 1878	Thomas Hodgins	Liberal	David McLaws	Liberal	Resignation to contest the 1878 federal election	Yes
Algoma	October 8, 1878†	Simon James Dawson	Liberal	Robert Adam Lyon	Liberal	Resignation to contest the 1878 federal election	Yes
Brant South	March 29, 1877†	Arthur Sturgis Hardy	Liberal	Arthur Sturgis Hardy	Liberal	Sought re-election upon appointment as Provincial Secretary and Registrar	Yes
Waterloo South	February 19, 1877	John Fleming	Liberal	Isaac Master	Liberal	Death	Yes
Frontenac	February 12, 1877	Peter Graham	Conservative	Delino Dexter Calvin	Conservative	Death	Yes
Wellington South	October 11, 1876†	Peter Gow	Liberal	James Massie	Liberal	Resignation to become Sheriff of Wellington County	Yes
Northumberland East	November 9, 1875	James Marshall Ferris	Liberal	James Marshall Ferris	Liberal	Void Election	Yes
Halton	November 2, 1875	William Barber	Liberal	William Durie Lyon	Liberal	Void Election	Yes
Grey North	October 30, 1875	Thomas Scott	Conservative	David Creighton	Conservative	Void Election	Yes
Wentworth North	October 29, 1875	Thomas Stock	Conservative	James McMahon	Liberal	Void Election	No
Peterborough West	October 26, 1875	George Albertus Cox	Liberal	William Hepburn Scott	Conservative	Void Election	No
Victoria North	September 29, 1875	John David Smith	Liberal	Duncan McRae	Conservative	Void Election	No
Wellington West	September 27, 1875	John McGowan	Liberal-Conservative	John McGowan	Liberal-Conservative	Void Election	Yes
Dundas	September 25, 1875	Andrew Broder	Conservative	Andrew Broder	Conservative	Void Election	Yes
Peterborough East	September 24, 1875	John C. O'Sullivan	Conservative	John C. O'Sullivan	Conservative	Void Election	Yes
Kent East	September 17, 1875	Archibald McKellar	Liberal	Daniel McCraney	Liberal	Appointed Sheriff of Wentworth County	Yes
Essex South	September 17, 1875	Lewis Wigle	Conservative	Lewis Wigle	Conservative	Void Election	Yes
Oxford South	September 11, 1875	Adam Oliver	Liberal	Adam Crooks	Liberal	Void Election	Yes
Russell	August 12, 1875	Adam Jacob Baker	Conservative	Adam Jacob Baker	Conservative	Void Election	Yes
Victoria South	August 10, 1875	Samuel Casey Wood	Liberal	Samuel Casey Wood	Liberal	Sought re-election upon appointment as Provincial Secretary and Commissioner of Agriculture	Yes
Cornwall	July 17, 1875	Alexander Fraser McIntyre	Conservative	John Goodall Snetsinger	Liberal	Void Election	No
Welland	July 2, 1875	James Currie	Liberal	James Currie	Liberal	Void Election	Yes
Monck	June 22, 1875	Henry Ryan Haney	Liberal	Henry Ryan Haney	Liberal	Void Election	Yes
Ontario North	June 21, 1875	Thomas Paxton	Liberal	Thomas Paxton	Liberal	Void Election	Yes
Simcoe South	May 26, 1875	D'Arcy Boulton	Conservative	William McDougall	Independent Liberal	Death	No

† Won by acclamation

== 2nd Legislative Assembly of Ontario 1871–1874 ==
By-election	Date	Incumbent	Party	Winner	Party	Cause	Retained
Peterborough West	July 30, 1874	Thomas McCulloch Fairbairn	Liberal	William Hepburn Scott	Conservative	Death	No
Wellington North	February 20, 1874	Robert McKim	Liberal	John McGowan	Conservative	Resignation to enter federal politics	No
Perth North	February 14, 1874	Andrew Monteith	Conservative	Thomas Mayne Daly	Conservative	Resignation to enter federal politics	Yes
Oxford South	January 19, 1874†	Adam Oliver	Liberal	Adam Oliver	Liberal	Resignation due to not being appointed Sheriff of Oxford County and selling timber to the provincial government	Yes
Ottawa	January 18, 1874	Richard William Scott	Liberal	Daniel John O'Donoghue	Independent Labour	Appointed to the Senate	Yes
Simcoe South	December 30, 1873	Thomas Roberts Ferguson	Conservative	D'Arcy Boulton	Conservative	Resignation	Yes
Peel	December 19, 1873	John Coyne	Conservative	Kenneth Chisholm	Liberal	Death	No
Grenville South	December 9, 1873†	Christopher Finlay Fraser	Liberal	Christopher Finlay Fraser	Liberal	Sought re-election upon appointment as Provincial Secretary and Registrar	Yes
Leeds South	December 1873†	Herbert Stone MacDonald	Conservative	John Godkin Giles	Conservative	Resignation to be appointed to the county court	Yes
Huron South	October 16, 1873	Robert Gibbons	Liberal	Archibald Bishop	Liberal	Resignation to become Sheriff of Huron County	Yes
Brant South	April 28, 1873	Edmund Burke Wood	Conservative	Arthur Sturgis Hardy	Liberal	Resignation to enter federal politics	No
Oxford North	November 29, 1872†	George Perry	Liberal	Oliver Mowat	Liberal	Resignation to provide a seat for Mowat	Yes
Lambton	November 13, 1872†	Timothy Blair Pardee	Liberal	Timothy Blair Pardee	Liberal	Sought re-election upon appointment as Provincial Secretary and Registrar	Yes
Grenville South	October 16, 1872	Christopher Finlay Fraser	Liberal	Christopher Finlay Fraser	Liberal	Void Election	Yes
Middlesex West	September 17, 1872	Alexander Mackenzie	Liberal	John Watterworth	Liberal	Resignation upon abolition of the dual mandate	Yes
Bruce South	September 14, 1872	Edward Blake	Liberal	Rupert Mearse Wells	Liberal	Resignation upon abolition of the dual mandate	Yes
Monck	September 1872	Lachlin McCallum	Conservative	Henry Ryan Haney	Liberal	Resignation upon abolition of the dual mandate	No
London	August 26, 1872	John Carling	Conservative	William Ralph Meredith	Conservative	Resignation upon abolition of the dual mandate	Yes
Lanark North	August 23, 1872	Daniel Galbraith	Liberal	William Clyde Caldwell	Liberal	Resignation to enter federal politics	Yes
Cornwall	July 13, 1872	John Sandfield Macdonald	Conservative	John Goodall Snetsinger	Liberal	Death	No
Grenville South	March 26, 1872	Mcneil Clarke	Conservative	Christopher Finlay Fraser	Liberal	Death	No
Toronto West	January 9, 1872	Adam Crooks	Liberal	Adam Crooks	Liberal	Sought re-election upon appointment as Attorney-General	Yes
Bothwell	January 6, 1872†	Archibald McKellar	Liberal	Archibald McKellar	Liberal	Sought re-election upon appointment as Commissioner of Agriculture and Public Works	Yes
Middlesex West	January 5, 1872†	Alexander Mackenzie	Liberal	Alexander Mackenzie	Liberal	Sought re-election upon appointment as Provincial Secretary and Registrar	Yes
Bruce South	January 5, 1872†	Edward Blake	Liberal	Edward Blake	Liberal	Resignation to re-contest upon being appointed Premier	Yes
Northumberland West	January 5, 1872	Alexander Fraser	Liberal	Charles Gifford	Conservative	Resignation	No
Wellington South	January 4, 1872†	Peter Gow	Liberal	Peter Gow	Liberal	Sought re-election upon appointment as Provincial Secretary and Registrar	Yes
Ottawa	January 4, 1872†	Richard William Scott	Liberal	Richard William Scott	Liberal	Sought re-election upon appointment as Commissioner of Crown Lands	Yes
Stormont	January 3, 1872	William Colquhoun	Conservative	James Bethune	Liberal	Void Election	No
Simcoe North	January 2, 1872	William Davis Ardagh	Conservative	William Davis Ardagh	Conservative	Void Election	Yes
Carleton	January 2, 1872	George William Monk	Conservative	George William Monk	Conservative	Void Election	Yes
Prince Edward	December 29, 1871	Gideon Striker	Liberal	James Simeon McCuaig	Conservative	Void Election	No
Prince Edward	December 29, 1871	James Simeon McCuaig	Conservative	Gideon Striker	Liberal	By-election result reversed August 29, 1872	No
Grey South	December 29, 1871	Abram William Lauder	Conservative	Abram William Lauder	Conservative	Void Election	Yes
Prescott	December 27, 1871†	George Wellesley Hamilton	Conservative	George Wellesley Hamilton	Conservative	Void Election	Yes
Durham West	December 27, 1871†	Edward Blake	Liberal	John McLeod	Liberal	Chose to sit for Bruce South	Yes

† Won by acclamation

== 1st Legislative Assembly of Ontario 1867–1871 ==
By-election	Date	Incumbent	Party	Winner	Party	Cause	Retained
Prince Edward	June 29, 1870	Absalom Greeley	Liberal	William Anderson	Conservative	Appointed Sheriff of Prince Edward County	No
Renfrew North	December 1, 1869	John Supple	Conservative	Thomas Murray	Liberal	Resignation	No
Lanark South	February 3–4, 1869	William McNairn Shaw	Conservative	Abraham Code	Conservative	Death	Yes
Frontenac	October 19, 1868	Henry Smith	Conservative	Delino Dexter Calvin	Conservative	Death	Yes
Niagara	December 1867	Donald Robertson	Conservative	Stephen Richards	Conservative	Appointed Coroner	Yes

== See also ==
- List of federal by-elections in Canada
