= Edward Dunlop =

Edward Dunlop may refer to:

- Ed Dunlop (Edward A. L. Dunlop, born 1968), British thoroughbred racehorse trainer
- Edward Arunah Dunlop (1876–1934), Canadian industrialist and politician
- Edward Arunah Dunlop Jr. (1919–1981), politician in Ontario, Canada
- Weary Dunlop (Ernest Edward Dunlop, 1907–1993), a.k.a. Sir Edward Dunlop, Australian surgeon
