= Norman Reid =

Norman Reid may refer to:

- Norman Reid (cricketer) (1890–1947), South African cricketer
- Norman Reid (museum director) (1915–2007), director of the Tate gallery
- Norman Reid (politician), Ontario politician

== See also ==
- Norman Read (1931–1994), New Zealand racewalker
- Reid (disambiguation) for other uses of the name
- Read (surname), variant spelling
