= Thomas Deacon (politician) =

Canadian politician (1832–1911)

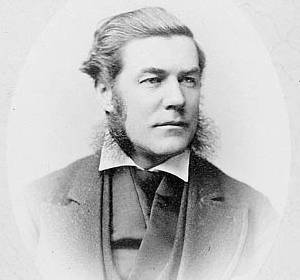

Ontario MPP
- In office 1871–1879
- Preceded by: Thomas Murray
- Succeeded by: Thomas Murray
- Constituency: Renfrew North

Personal details
- Born: November 7, 1832 Perth, Upper Canada
- Died: March 18, 1911 (aged 78) Pembroke, Ontario
- Party: Conservative
- Spouse: Caroline Rebecca Dunlop (m. 1864)
- Profession: Lawyer

Thomas Deacon, QC (November 7, 1832 – March 18, 1911) was an Ontario lawyer, judge, businessman and political figure. He represented Renfrew North in the Legislative Assembly of Ontario from 1871 to 1879.

He was born in Perth in Upper Canada in 1832, the son of John Deacon, an Irish immigrant. He studied law with his brother John, was called to the bar in 1862 and went on to practise in Pembroke. Deacon married Caroline Rebecca Dunlop in 1864. He was named Queen's Counsel in 1876. He served as a member of the town council. Deacon was a director of the Kingston and Pembroke Railway and president of a lumber company. He was named judge in Renfrew County in 1895. Deacon was also county master for the Orange Order. He died in 1911 in Pembroke.

Deacon, a geographic township in Nipissing District, was named after him.

== Electoral history ==
Ontario provincial by-election, October 22, 1869: Renfrew North Resignation of John Supple
| Party | Candidate | Votes | % | ±% |
|---|---|---|---|---|
| Liberal | Thomas Murray | 518 | 53.40 | +25.23 |
| Conservative | Thomas Deacon | 452 | 46.60 | −25.14 |
| Total valid votes | | 970 | 100.0 | −13.24 |
| Liberal gain from Conservative | | Swing | | +25.18 |
Source: History of the Electoral Districts, Legislatures and Ministries of the Province of Ontario

1871 Ontario general election: Renfrew North
| Party | Candidate | Votes | % | ±% |
|---|---|---|---|---|
| Conservative | Thomas Deacon | 640 | 56.74 | +11.67 |
| Liberal | Thomas Murray | 488 | 43.26 | −11.67 |
| Turnout | | 1,128 | 74.31 | 19.62 |
| Eligible voters | | 1,518 | | |
| Conservative gain from Liberal | | Swing | | +11.67 |
Source: Elections Ontario

1875 Ontario general election: Renfrew North
| Party | Candidate | Votes | % | ±% |
|---|---|---|---|---|
| Conservative | Thomas Deacon | 894 | 53.44 | −3.30 |
| Liberal | T.W. Moffat | 779 | 46.56 | +3.30 |
| Total valid votes | | 1,673 | 76.71 | +2.40 |
| Eligible voters | | 2,181 | | |
| Conservative hold | | Swing | | −3.30 |
Source: Elections Ontario

1879 Ontario general election: Renfrew North
| Party | Candidate | Votes | % | ±% |
|---|---|---|---|---|
| Liberal | Thomas Murray | 1,066 | 52.56 | +6.00 |
| Conservative | Thomas Deacon | 962 | 47.44 | −6.00 |
| Total valid votes | | 2,028 | 72.07 | −4.64 |
| Eligible voters | | 2,814 | | |
| Liberal gain from Conservative | | Swing | | +6.00 |
Source: Elections Ontario
