= Renfrew North (provincial electoral district) =

Former provincial electoral district in Ontario, Canada

Ontario electoral district

Defunct provincial electoral district
- Legislature: Legislative Assembly of Ontario
- District created: 1867
- District abolished: 1996
- First contested: 1867
- Last contested: 1995

Renfrew North was a provincial electoral district in Ontario, Canada. It was created in 1867 at the time of confederation and was abolished in 1996 before the 1999 election.

== Representatives ==
=== Prominent Players ===
Renfrew North produced two prominent cabinet ministers, in office 50 years apart.

- Edward Arunah Dunlop, Conservative MPP over three different stints between 1903 and 1934, was a prominent member of the Toronto business community while he was not in public office. He was twice acclaimed to the seat (in 1911 and 1929) and was Provincial Treasurer in the Ferguson ministry and the Henry ministry. He was the second Provincial Treasurer from Renfrew, after Thomas McGarry of the Hearst ministry.
- Sean Conway, Liberal MPP from 1975 to 1999, was only 24 when he ended the Progressive Conservatives' three-decade run of the riding. Ten years later in 1985, he was one of the three Liberal negotiators that brokered the governing accord with the NDP that ended the Progressive Conservatives' four-decade run of the province, and was among the most powerful ministers in the Peterson ministry that follows.

=== Family business ===
The following only highlights selected direct family connections.

- Between Thomas Murray's first and second stint as the local Liberal MPP, his brother William represented the riding in the House of Commons for a year before being unseated in 1875. Thomas reclaimed that federal seat twice years later, in 1891 and in 1900. The brothers registered the mining claim for the Murray Mine which was in operation until the 1970s.
- Three generations of Dunlop served in the legislature. Father and son Arunah Dunlop and Edward Arunah Dunlop represented this riding over four separate periods between 1890 and 1934, while grandson Edward Arunah Dunlop Jr. represented a Toronto riding in the 1960s. Both Edward and Edward Jr. were appointed to the provincial cabinet, forty year apart.
- Sean Conway's grandfather Thomas Patrick Murray was the member for Renfrew South from 1929 and 1945.

=== Dying in office ===
Six of the earlier Renfrew North MPP died in office, an unusually high number.

- John Supple held the Renfrew seat in the Legislative Assembly of the Province of Canada confederation and continued to serve in the new provincial legislature, but died in 1869 having only served two years in the first parliament.
- Arunah Dunlop was elected to the 7th parliament, died after only two years of service.
- Andrew Thomas White was elected to the 9th parliament, similarly died after two years of service.
- John W. Munro succeeded White and served out the remaining term of the 9th parliament, got re-elected to the 10th parliament but died two days after from blood poisoning, again only having served two years.
- Alexander Stuart was elected to the 16th parliament, survived long enough to completed the term and to get reelected to the 17th parliament, and died in 1928 without completing his second term.
- Dunlop's son Edward Arunah Dunlop twice entered the legislature mid-term succeeding dead incumbents, Munro in 1902 and Stuart in 1928, before succumbing himself on New Year's Day 1934 while the Provincial Treasurer.

== List of Members of Provincial Parliament ==
✟ Member died in office

Renfrew North
| Assembly | Years | Member | Party |
|---|---|---|---|
| 1st | 1867–1869 | John Supple ✟ | Liberal |
| 1st | 1869–1871 | Thomas Murray | Liberal |
| 2nd | 1871–1875 | Thomas Deacon | Conservative |
| 3rd | 1875–1879 | Thomas Deacon | Conservative |
| 4th | 1879–1882 | Thomas Murray | Liberal |
| 4th | 1882–1883 | William Balmer McAllister | Conservative |
| 5th | 1883–1886 | Thomas Murray | Liberal |
| 6th | 1886–1890 | Thomas Murray | Liberal |
| 7th | 1890–1892 | Arunah Dunlop ✟ | Conservative |
| 7th | 1892–1894 | Henry Barr | Liberal |
| 8th | 1894–1898 | Henry Barr | Liberal |
| 9th | 1898–1900 | Andrew Thomas White ✟ | Conservative |
| 9th | 1900–1902 | John W. Munro ✟ | Liberal |
| 10th | 1902–1902 | John W. Munro ✟ | Liberal |
| 10th | 1902–1905 | Edward Arunah Dunlop | Conservative |
| 11th | 1905–1908 | Edward Arunah Dunlop | Conservative |
| 12th | 1908–1911 | Norman Reid | Liberal |
| 13th | 1911–1914 | Edward Arunah Dunlop | Conservative |
| 14th | 1914–1919 | Edward Arunah Dunlop | Conservative |
| 15th | 1919–1923 | Ralph Warren | United Farmers |
| 16th | 1923–1926 | Alexander Stuart ✟ | Conservative |
| 17th | 1926–1928 | Alexander Stuart ✟ | Conservative |
| 17th | 1928–1929 | Edward Arunah Dunlop ✟ | Conservative |
| 18th | 1929–1934 | Edward Arunah Dunlop ✟ | Conservative |
| 19th | 1934–1937 | John Courtland Bradley | Liberal |
| 20th | 1937–1943 | John Courtland Bradley | Liberal |
| 21st | 1943–1945 | Stanley Joseph Hunt | Progressive Conservative |
| 22nd | 1945–1948 | Stanley Joseph Hunt | Progressive Conservative |
| 23rd | 1948–1951 | Stanley Joseph Hunt | Progressive Conservative |
| 24th | 1951–1955 | Stanley Joseph Hunt | Progressive Conservative |
| 25th | 1955–1958 | Stanley Joseph Hunt | Progressive Conservative |
| 25th | 1958–1959 | Maurice Hamilton | Progressive Conservative |
| 26th | 1959–1963 | Maurice Hamilton | Progressive Conservative |
| 27th | 1963–1967 | Maurice Hamilton | Progressive Conservative |
| 28th | 1967–1971 | Maurice Hamilton | Progressive Conservative |
| 29th | 1971–1975 | Maurice Hamilton | Progressive Conservative |
| 30th | 1975–1977 | Sean Conway | Liberal |
| 31st | 1977–1981 | Sean Conway | Liberal |
| 32nd | 1981–1985 | Sean Conway | Liberal |
| 33rd | 1985–1987 | Sean Conway | Liberal |
| 34th | 1987–1990 | Sean Conway | Liberal |
| 35th | 1990–1995 | Sean Conway | Liberal |
| 36th | 1995–1999 | Sean Conway | Liberal |
Sourced from the Ontario Legislative Assembly
Merged into Renfrew—Nipissing—Pembroke 1996

== Election results ==
1995 Ontario general election
| Party | Candidate | Votes | % | ±% |
|---|---|---|---|---|
| Liberal | Sean Conway | 16,044 | 53.32 | +10.00 |
| Progressive Conservative | Dan Callaghan | 9,681 | 32.17 | +16.99 |
| New Democratic | Ish Theilheimer | 2,483 | 8.25 | –11.34 |
| Family Coalition | Stan Callaghan | 1,695 | 5.63 | +1.98 |
| Natural Law | André Giardano | 187 | 0.62 | – |
| Total valid votes | | 30,090 | 99.30 | |
| Total rejected, unmarked and declined ballots | | 213 | 0.70 | +0.09 |
| Turnout | | 30,303 | 61.00 | –4.62 |
| Eligible voters | | 49,678 | | |
| Liberal hold | | Swing | | –3.49 |
Source: Elections Ontario

1990 Ontario general election
| Party | Candidate | Votes | % | ±% |
|---|---|---|---|---|
| Liberal | Sean Conway | 13,082 | 43.32 | –19.41 |
| New Democratic | Ish Theilheimer | 5,916 | 19.59 | +6.17 |
| Confederation of Regions | Frank E. Adlam | 5,510 | 18.25 | – |
| Progressive Conservative | Diane Yakabuski | 4,586 | 15.19 | –3.97 |
| Family Coalition | Stephen Stanistreet | 1,104 | 3.66 | –1.04 |
| Total valid votes | | 30,198 | 99.39 | |
| Total rejected, unmarked and declined ballots | | 186 | 0.61 | +0.13 |
| Turnout | | 30,384 | 65.62 | –1.50 |
| Eligible voters | | 46,306 | | |
| Liberal hold | | Swing | | –12.79 |
Source: Elections Ontario

1987 Ontario general election
| Party | Candidate | Votes | % | ±% |
|---|---|---|---|---|
| Liberal | Sean Conway | 18,507 | 62.73 | –3.72 |
| Progressive Conservative | Stu Mark | 5,652 | 19.16 | –10.57 |
| New Democratic | Ish Theilheimer | 3,958 | 13.42 | +9.59 |
| Family Coalition | Shirley Witt | 1,385 | 4.69 | – |
| Total valid votes | | 29,502 | 99.52 | |
| Total rejected ballots | | 143 | 0.48 | –0.02 |
| Turnout | | 29,645 | 67.12 | +3.58 |
| Eligible voters | | 44,170 | | |
| Liberal hold | | Swing | | +3.43 |
Source: Elections Ontario

1985 Ontario general election
| Party | Candidate | Votes | % | ±% |
|---|---|---|---|---|
| Liberal | Sean Conway | 12,849 | 66.45 | +13.88 |
| Progressive Conservative | Bryan D. Hocking | 5,748 | 29.73 | –11.44 |
| New Democratic | Robert Cottingham | 740 | 3.83 | –2.44 |
| Total valid votes | | 19,337 | 99.50 | |
| Total rejected ballots | | 98 | 0.50 | +0.22 |
| Turnout | | 19,435 | 63.53 | +5.39 |
| Eligible voters | | 30,590 | | |
| Liberal hold | | Swing | | +12.66 |
Source: Elections Ontario

1981 Ontario general election
| Party | Candidate | Votes | % | ±% |
|---|---|---|---|---|
| Liberal | Sean Conway | 9,113 | 52.57 | +6.77 |
| Progressive Conservative | Bryan D. Hocking | 7,137 | 41.17 | +8.47 |
| New Democratic | Phil Chester | 1,086 | 6.26 | –15.24 |
| Total valid votes | | 17,336 | 99.72 | |
| Total rejected ballots | | 49 | 0.28 | +0.11 |
| Turnout | | 17,385 | 58.15 | –15.79 |
| Eligible voters | | 29,898 | | |
| Liberal hold | | Swing | | –0.85 |
Source: Elections Ontario

1977 Ontario general election
| Party | Candidate | Votes | % | ±% |
|---|---|---|---|---|
| Liberal | Sean Conway | 9,549 | 45.80 | +10.39 |
| Progressive Conservative | Bob Cotnam | 6,817 | 32.70 | –1.79 |
| New Democratic | Bob J. Cox | 4,483 | 21.50 | –8.60 |
| Total valid votes | | 20,849 | 99.83 | |
| Total rejected ballots | | 36 | 0.17 | –0.04 |
| Turnout | | 20,885 | 73.93 | +3.06 |
| Eligible voters | | 28,248 | | |
| Liberal hold | | Swing | | +6.09 |
Source: Elections Ontario

1975 Ontario general election
| Party | Candidate | Votes | % | ±% |
|---|---|---|---|---|
| Liberal | Sean Conway | 7,058 | 35.41 | –1.16 |
| Progressive Conservative | Bob Cotnam | 6,875 | 34.49 | –17.27 |
| New Democratic | Bob J. Cox | 6,001 | 30.10 | +19.23 |
| Total valid votes | | 19,934 | 99.79 | |
| Total rejected ballots | | 42 | 0.21 | –0.41 |
| Turnout | | 19,976 | 70.87 | –0.55 |
| Eligible voters | | 28,186 | | |
| Liberal gain from Progressive Conservative | | Swing | | +8.06 |
Source: Elections Ontario

1971 Ontario general election
| Party | Candidate | Votes | % | ±% |
|---|---|---|---|---|
| Progressive Conservative | Maurice Hamilton | 11,980 | 51.76 | –10.38 |
| Liberal | Izett McBride | 8,463 | 36.57 | +3.79 |
| New Democratic | Frank Berry | 2,516 | 10.87 | +5.79 |
| Independent | Ronald B. Cawthorn | 185 | 0.80 | – |
| Total valid votes | | 23,144 | 99.38 | |
| Total rejected ballots | | 145 | 0.62 | –0.00 |
| Turnout | | 23,289 | 71.42 | +5.09 |
| Eligible voters | | 32,608 | | |
| Progressive Conservative hold | | Swing | | –7.09 |
Source: Elections Ontario

1967 Ontario general election
| Party | Candidate | Votes | % | ±% |
|---|---|---|---|---|
| Progressive Conservative | Maurice Hamilton | 10,401 | 62.15 | +4.34 |
| Liberal | Roselma Sinclair | 5,485 | 32.77 | –4.76 |
| New Democratic | Ian A. Douglas | 850 | 5.08 | +0.41 |
| Total valid votes | | 16,736 | 99.38 | |
| Total rejected ballots | | 105 | 0.62 | –0.11 |
| Turnout | | 16,841 | 66.33 | –4.20 |
| Eligible voters | | 25,389 | | |
| Progressive Conservative hold | | Swing | | +4.55 |
Source: Elections Ontario

1963 Ontario general election
| Party | Candidate | Votes | % | ±% |
|---|---|---|---|---|
| Progressive Conservative | Maurice Hamilton | 10,664 | 57.80 | +8.25 |
| Liberal | George Wallace | 6,924 | 37.53 | –5.47 |
| New Democratic | Marc Llanos | 861 | 4.67 | –2.78 |
| Total valid votes | | 18,449 | 99.26 | |
| Total rejected ballots | | 137 | 0.74 | –0.20 |
| Turnout | | 18,586 | 70.53 | +1.89 |
| Eligible voters | | 26,352 | | |
| Progressive Conservative hold | | Swing | | +6.86 |
Source: Elections Ontario

1959 Ontario general election
| Party | Candidate | Votes | % | ±% |
|---|---|---|---|---|
| Progressive Conservative | Maurice Hamilton | 8,448 | 49.55 | –5.58 |
| Liberal | Garwood Warren | 7,330 | 43.00 | –1.87 |
| Co-operative Commonwealth | Wilfred L. Charbonneau | 1,270 | 7.45 | – |
| Total valid votes | | 17,048 | 99.06 | |
| Total rejected ballots | | 162 | 0.94 | –0.00 |
| Turnout | | 17,210 | 68.64 | +10.02 |
| Eligible voters | | 25,072 | | |
| Progressive Conservative hold | | Swing | | –1.86 |
Source: Elections Ontario

Ontario provincial by-election, May 12, 1958 Resignation of Stanley Joseph Hunt to enter federal politics
| Party | Candidate | Votes | % | ±% |
|---|---|---|---|---|
| Progressive Conservative | Maurice Hamilton | 8,053 | 55.13 | +2.79 |
| Liberal | Garwood Warren | 6,553 | 44.87 | +6.20 |
| Total valid votes | | 14,606 | 99.06 | |
| Total rejected ballots | | 139 | 0.94 | –0.10 |
| Turnout | | 14,745 | 58.63 | –11.71 |
| Eligible voters | | 25,151 | | |
| Progressive Conservative hold | | Swing | | –1.71 |
Source: Elections Ontario

1955 Ontario general election
| Party | Candidate | Votes | % | ±% |
|---|---|---|---|---|
| Progressive Conservative | Stanley Joseph Hunt | 8,215 | 52.34 | –5.59 |
| Liberal | Patrick J. Code | 6,068 | 38.66 | –3.41 |
| Co-operative Commonwealth | Jack Wilcox | 1,411 | 8.99 | – |
| Total valid votes | | 15,694 | 98.96 | |
| Total rejected ballots | | 165 | 1.04 | +0.12 |
| Turnout | | 15,859 | 70.34 | +2.59 |
| Eligible voters | | 22,547 | | |
| Progressive Conservative hold | | Swing | | –1.09 |
Source: Elections Ontario

1951 Ontario general election
| Party | Candidate | Votes | % | ±% |
|---|---|---|---|---|
| Progressive Conservative | Stanley Joseph Hunt | 7,769 | 57.93 | +13.42 |
| Liberal | John Courtland Bradley | 5,642 | 42.07 | +0.42 |
| Total valid votes | | 13,411 | 99.08 | |
| Total rejected ballots | | 124 | 0.92 | +0.04 |
| Turnout | | 13,535 | 67.75 | –4.57 |
| Eligible voters | | 19,978 | | |
| Progressive Conservative hold | | Swing | | +6.50 |
Source: Elections Ontario

1948 Ontario general election
| Party | Candidate | Votes | % | ±% |
|---|---|---|---|---|
| Progressive Conservative | Stanley Joseph Hunt | 5,864 | 44.51 | –1.46 |
| Liberal | James Forgie | 5,487 | 41.65 | +7.47 |
| Co-operative Commonwealth | Ezra W. Getz | 1,824 | 13.84 | –6.01 |
| Total valid votes | | 13,175 | 99.13 | |
| Total rejected ballots | | 116 | 0.87 | +0.36 |
| Turnout | | 13,291 | 72.32 | –7.52 |
| Eligible voters | | 18,378 | | |
| Progressive Conservative hold | | Swing | | –4.47 |
Source: Elections Ontario

1945 Ontario general election
| Party | Candidate | Votes | % | ±% |
|---|---|---|---|---|
| Progressive Conservative | Stanley Joseph Hunt | 6,118 | 45.97 | +5.15 |
| Liberal | Albert Wallace | 4,548 | 34.17 | –0.73 |
| Co-operative Commonwealth | Ezra W. Getz | 2,643 | 19.86 | –4.42 |
| Total valid votes | | 13,309 | 99.48 | |
| Total rejected ballots | | 69 | 0.52 | +0.01 |
| Turnout | | 13,378 | 79.84 | +10.98 |
| Eligible voters | | 16,756 | | |
| Progressive Conservative hold | | Swing | | +2.94 |
Source: Elections Ontario

1943 Ontario general election
| Party | Candidate | Votes | % | ±% |
|---|---|---|---|---|
| Progressive Conservative | Stanley Joseph Hunt | 4,185 | 40.82 | –8.02 |
| Liberal | John Courtland Bradley | 3,579 | 34.91 | –16.25 |
| Co-operative Commonwealth | A. T. Sweezey | 2,489 | 24.28 | – |
| Total valid votes | | 10,253 | 99.50 | |
| Total rejected ballots | | 52 | 0.50 | –0.03 |
| Turnout | | 10,305 | 68.86 | –7.33 |
| Eligible voters | | 14,965 | | |
| Progressive Conservative gain from Liberal | | Swing | | +4.12 |
Source: Elections Ontario

1937 Ontario general election
| Party | Candidate | Votes | % | ±% |
|---|---|---|---|---|
| Liberal | John Courtland Bradley | 6,219 | 51.16 | –9.70 |
| Conservative | Ira Delbert Cotnam | 5,937 | 48.84 | +9.70 |
| Total valid votes | | 12,156 | 99.47 | |
| Total rejected ballots | | 65 | 0.53 | –0.21 |
| Turnout | | 12,221 | 76.19 | –0.61 |
| Eligible voters | | 16,040 | | |
| Liberal hold | | Swing | | –9.70 |
Source: Elections Ontario

1934 Ontario general election
| Party | Candidate | Votes | % | ±% |
|---|---|---|---|---|
| Liberal | John Courtland Bradley | 7,770 | 60.86 | – |
| Conservative | Robert Edmund Davis | 4,998 | 39.14 | – |
| Total valid votes | | 12,768 | 99.25 | |
| Total rejected ballots | | 96 | 0.75 | – |
| Turnout | | 12,864 | 76.80 | – |
| Eligible voters | | 16,749 | | |
| Liberal gain from Conservative | | Swing | | – |
Source: Elections Ontario

Ontario provincial by-election, October 18, 1930 Ministerial by-election, upon appointment as Provincial Treasurer
| Party | Candidate | Votes |
|---|---|---|
| Conservative | Edward Arunah Dunlop | acclaimed |
Source: Elections Ontario

1929 Ontario general election
| Party | Candidate | Votes |
|---|---|---|
| Conservative | Edward Arunah Dunlop | acclaimed |
Source: Elections Ontario

Ontario provincial by-election, June 27, 1928 Death of Alexander Stuart
| Party | Candidate | Votes | % | ±% |
|---|---|---|---|---|
| Conservative | Edward Arunah Dunlop | 5,385 | 62.84 | +3.11 |
| Liberal | Paul Martin Sr. | 3,184 | 37.16 | – |
| Total valid votes | | 8,569 | 100.00 | |
| Total rejected ballots | | – | | |
| Turnout | | 8,569 | – | – |
| Eligible voters | | | | |
| Conservative hold | | Swing | | +1.55 |
Source: Elections Ontario

1926 Ontario general election
| Party | Candidate | Votes | % | ±% |
|---|---|---|---|---|
| Conservative | Alexander Stuart | 5,000 | 59.74 | +9.09 |
| Prohibitionist | Ralph Warren | 3,370 | 40.26 | –9.09 |
| Total valid votes | | 8,370 | 99.51 | |
| Total rejected ballots | | 41 | 0.49 | –1.03 |
| Turnout | | 8,411 | 58.40 | –5.38 |
| Eligible voters | | 14,403 | | |
| Conservative hold | | Swing | | +9.09 |
Source: Elections Ontario

1923 Ontario general election
| Party | Candidate | Votes | % | ±% |
|---|---|---|---|---|
| Conservative | Alexander Stuart | 4,235 | 50.65 | +11.92 |
| United Farmers | Ralph Warren | 4,127 | 49.35 | +8.26 |
| Total valid votes | | 8,362 | 98.48 | |
| Total rejected ballots | | 129 | 1.52 | –0.90 |
| Turnout | | 8,491 | 63.78 | –16.02 |
| Eligible voters | | 13,313 | | |
| Conservative gain from United Farmers | | Swing | | +1.83 |
Source: Elections Ontario

1919 Ontario general election
| Party | Candidate | Votes | % | ±% |
|---|---|---|---|---|
| United Farmers | Ralph Warren | 3,979 | 41.10 | – |
| Conservative | Edward Arunah Dunlop | 3,749 | 38.72 | –19.04 |
| Liberal | Thomas A. Moffatt | 1,954 | 20.18 | –22.05 |
| Total valid votes | | 9,682 | 97.58 | |
| Total rejected ballots | | 240 | 2.42 | +2.01 |
| Turnout | | 9,922 | 79.80 | –18.58 |
| Eligible voters | | 12,434 | | |
| United Farmers gain from Conservative | | Swing | | +11.03 |
Source: Elections Ontario

1914 Ontario general election
| Party | Candidate | Votes | % | ±% |
|---|---|---|---|---|
| Conservative | Edward Arunah Dunlop | 2,548 | 57.76 | – |
| Liberal | William Markus | 1,863 | 42.24 | – |
| Total valid votes | | 4,411 | 99.59 | |
| Total rejected ballots | | 18 | 0.41 | – |
| Turnout | | 4,429 | 98.38 | – |
| Eligible voters | | 4,502 | | |
| Conservative hold | | Swing | | – |
Source: Elections Ontario

1911 Ontario general election
| Party | Candidate | Votes |
|---|---|---|
| Conservative | Edward Arunah Dunlop | acclaimed |
Source: Elections Ontario

1908 Ontario general election
| Party | Candidate | Votes | % | ±% |
|---|---|---|---|---|
| Liberal | Norman Reid | 2,274 | 52.28 | +19.69 |
| Conservative | Alexander Morris | 2,076 | 47.72 | –19.69 |
| Total valid votes | | 4,350 | 99.41 | |
| Total rejected ballots | | 26 | 0.59 | +0.02 |
| Turnout | | 4,376 | 86.47 | +22.17 |
| Eligible voters | | 5,061 | | |
| Liberal gain from Conservative | | Swing | | +19.69 |
Source: Elections Ontario

1905 Ontario general election
| Party | Candidate | Votes | % | ±% |
|---|---|---|---|---|
| Conservative | Edward Arunah Dunlop | 2,782 | 67.41 | +11.35 |
| Liberal | M. McKay | 1,345 | 32.59 | –11.35 |
| Total valid votes | | 4,127 | 99.42 | |
| Total rejected ballots | | 24 | 0.58 | +0.58 |
| Turnout | | 4,151 | 64.30 | – |
| Eligible voters | | 6,456 | | |
| Conservative hold | | Swing | | +11.35 |
Source: Elections Ontario

Ontario provincial by-election, December 26, 1903 Death of John W. Munro
| Party | Candidate | Votes | % | ±% |
|---|---|---|---|---|
| Conservative | Edward Arunah Dunlop | 2,765 | 56.06 | +10.98 |
| Liberal | L. Hale | 2,167 | 43.94 | –10.98 |
| Total valid votes | | 4,932 | 100.00 | |
| Total rejected ballots | | – | | |
| Turnout | | 4,932 | – | – |
| Eligible voters | | | | |
| Conservative gain from Liberal | | Swing | | +10.98 |
Source: Elections Ontario

1902 Ontario general election
| Party | Candidate | Votes | % | ±% |
|---|---|---|---|---|
| Liberal | John W. Munro | 2,565 | 54.91 | – |
| Conservative | Peter White | 2,106 | 45.09 | – |
| Total valid votes | | 4,671 | 99.94 | |
| Total rejected ballots | | 3 | 0.06 | – |
| Turnout | | 4,674 | 82.46 | – |
| Eligible voters | | 5,668 | | |
| Liberal hold | | Swing | | – |
Source: Elections Ontario

Ontario provincial by-election, June 19, 1900 Death of Andrew Thomas White
| Party | Candidate | Votes |
|---|---|---|
| Liberal | John W. Munro | acclaimed |
Source: Elections Ontario

1898 Ontario general election
| Party | Candidate | Votes | % | ±% |
|---|---|---|---|---|
| Conservative | Andrew Thomas White | 2,321 | 51.70 | +6.10 |
| Liberal | Henry Barr | 2,168 | 48.30 | –6.10 |
| Total valid votes | | 4,489 | 99.47 | |
| Total rejected ballots | | 24 | 0.53 | +0.07 |
| Turnout | | 4,513 | 82.63 | +7.17 |
| Eligible voters | | 5,462 | | |
| Conservative gain from Liberal | | Swing | | +6.10 |
Source: Elections Ontario

1894 Ontario general election
| Party | Candidate | Votes | % | ±% |
|---|---|---|---|---|
| Liberal | Henry Barr | 1,978 | 54.40 | –3.28 |
| Conservative | John Shaw | 1,658 | 45.60 | +3.28 |
| Total valid votes | | 3,636 | 99.53 | |
| Total rejected ballots | | 17 | 0.47 | +0.47 |
| Turnout | | 3,653 | 75.46 | – |
| Eligible voters | | 4,841 | | |
| Liberal hold | | Swing | | –3.28 |
Source: Elections Ontario

Ontario provincial by-election, February 29, 1892 Death of Arunah Dunlop
| Party | Candidate | Votes | % | ±% |
|---|---|---|---|---|
| Liberal | Henry Barr | 1,569 | 57.68 | +8.91 |
| Conservative | Findlay | 1,151 | 42.32 | –8.91 |
| Total valid votes | | 2,720 | 100.00 | |
| Total rejected ballots | | – | | |
| Turnout | | 2,720 | – | – |
| Eligible voters | | | | |
| Liberal gain from Conservative | | Swing | | +8.91 |
Source: Elections Ontario

1890 Ontario general election
| Party | Candidate | Votes | % | ±% |
|---|---|---|---|---|
| Conservative | Arunah Dunlop | 1,843 | 51.22 | +2.68 |
| Liberal | Thomas Murray | 1,755 | 48.78 | –2.68 |
| Total valid votes | | 3,598 | 99.20 | |
| Total rejected ballots | | 29 | 0.80 | –0.44 |
| Turnout | | 3,627 | 75.64 | +2.74 |
| Eligible voters | | 4,795 | | |
| Conservative gain from Liberal | | Swing | | +2.68 |
Source: Elections Ontario

1886 Ontario general election
| Party | Candidate | Votes | % | ±% |
|---|---|---|---|---|
| Liberal | Thomas Murray | 1,515 | 51.46 | –2.64 |
| Conservative | Arunah Dunlop | 1,429 | 48.54 | +2.64 |
| Total valid votes | | 2,944 | 98.76 | |
| Total rejected ballots | | 37 | 1.24 | +0.42 |
| Turnout | | 2,981 | 72.90 | +1.50 |
| Eligible voters | | 4,089 | | |
| Liberal hold | | Swing | | –2.64 |
Source: Elections Ontario

1883 Ontario general election
| Party | Candidate | Votes | % | ±% |
|---|---|---|---|---|
| Liberal | Thomas Murray | 1,108 | 54.10 | – |
| Conservative | Thomas Deacon | 940 | 45.90 | – |
| Total valid votes | | 2,048 | 99.18 | |
| Total rejected ballots | | 17 | 0.82 | – |
| Turnout | | 2,065 | 71.40 | – |
| Eligible voters | | 2,892 | | |
| Liberal gain from Conservative | | Swing | | – |
Source: Elections Ontario

Ontario provincial by-election, October 18, 1882 Resignation of Thomas Murray to contest the 1882 federal election
| Party | Candidate | Votes |
|---|---|---|
| Conservative | William Balmer McAllister | acclaimed |
Source: Elections Ontario

1879 Ontario general election
| Party | Candidate | Votes | % | ±% |
|---|---|---|---|---|
| Liberal | Thomas Murray | 1,066 | 52.56 | +6.00 |
| Conservative | Thomas Deacon | 962 | 47.44 | −6.00 |
| Total valid votes | | 2,028 | 72.07 | −4.64 |
| Eligible voters | | 2,814 | | |
| Liberal gain from Conservative | | Swing | | +6.00 |
Source: Elections Ontario

1875 Ontario general election
| Party | Candidate | Votes | % | ±% |
|---|---|---|---|---|
| Conservative | Thomas Deacon | 894 | 53.44 | −3.30 |
| Liberal | T.W. Moffat | 779 | 46.56 | +3.30 |
| Total valid votes | | 1,673 | 76.71 | +2.40 |
| Eligible voters | | 2,181 | | |
| Conservative hold | | Swing | | −3.30 |
Source: Elections Ontario

1871 Ontario general election
| Party | Candidate | Votes | % | ±% |
|---|---|---|---|---|
| Conservative | Thomas Deacon | 640 | 56.74 | +11.67 |
| Liberal | Thomas Murray | 488 | 43.26 | −11.67 |
| Turnout | | 1,128 | 74.31 | 19.62 |
| Eligible voters | | 1,518 | | |
| Conservative gain from Liberal | | Swing | | +11.67 |
Source: Elections Ontario

Ontario provincial by-election, October 22, 1869 Resignation of John Supple
| Party | Candidate | Votes | % | ±% |
|---|---|---|---|---|
| Liberal | Thomas Murray | 518 | 53.40 | +25.23 |
| Conservative | Thomas Deacon | 452 | 46.60 | −25.14 |
| Total valid votes | | 970 | 100.0 | −13.24 |
| Liberal gain from Conservative | | Swing | | +25.18 |
Source: History of the Electoral Districts, Legislatures and Ministries of the Province of Ontario

1867 Ontario general election
| Party | Candidate | Votes | % |
|---|---|---|---|
| Conservative | John Supple | 802 | 71.74 |
| Liberal | Mr. McAdam | 315 | 28.18 |
| Independent | Mr. Shaw | 1 | 0.09 |
| Total valid votes | | 1,118 | 80.26 |
| Eligible voters | | 1,393 | |
| Conservative pickup new district. | | | |
Source: Elections Ontario

== See also ==
- List of Ontario provincial electoral districts
- Canadian provincial electoral districts
