= Forest Hill (electoral district) =

Former provincial electoral district in Ontario, Canada

Forest Hill (1963–1967) York—Forest Hill (1967–1975)
Ontario electoral district

Defunct provincial electoral district
- Legislature: Legislative Assembly of Ontario
- District created: 1963
- District abolished: 1975
- First contested: 1963
- Last contested: 1971

Demographics
- Census division: Toronto
- Census subdivision: Toronto

Forest Hill was a provincial electoral district in Ontario, Canada. It was created prior to the 1963 provincial election and eliminated in 1975. Forest Hill riding was located in the former village of Forest Hill and the borough of York east of Dufferin Street. It had a large Jewish community, representing about 30% of the population.

Two Members of Provincial Parliament represented the riding during its history. The first, Edward Arunah Dunlop, Jr., was a son of Edward Arunah Dunlop, a veteran provincial politician who had previously represented the riding of Renfrew North. Former Toronto mayor Philip Givens represented the riding until it was abolished in 1975.

In the redistribution that took effect in the 1975 election, Forest Hill went to the riding of St. Andrew--St. Patrick and the borough of York sections went to the riding of Oakwood.

== Members of Provincial Parliament ==
Assembly	Years	Member	Party
Created from York South riding 1963
Forest Hill
27th	1963–1967	Edward Dunlop	Progressive Conservative
York—Forest Hill
28th	1967–1971	Edward Dunlop	Progressive Conservative
29th	1971–1975	Philip Givens	Liberal
Sourced from the Ontario Legislative Assembly
Merged into Oakwood and York South ridings after 1975

== Electoral results ==
1971 Ontario general election: York—Forest Hill
Party	Candidate	Votes	%	±%
Liberal	Philip Givens	13,870	41.52	+16.02
Progressive Conservative	Barry Lowes	12,570	37.63	–6.23
New Democratic	Fiona Nelson	6,963	20.85	–9.79
Total valid votes		33,403	99.37	
Total rejected ballots		213	0.63	–0.41
Turnout		33,616	72.89	+10.70
Eligible voters		46,118		
Liberal gain from Progressive Conservative		Swing		+12.90
Source: Elections Ontario

1967 Ontario general election: York—Forest Hill
Party	Candidate	Votes	%	±%
Progressive Conservative	Edward Arunah Dunlop Jr.	12,087	43.86	–
New Democratic	Leon Kumove	8,443	30.63	–
Liberal	Douglas Matthews	7,030	25.51	–
Total valid votes		27,560	98.96	
Total rejected ballots		290	1.04	–0.23
Turnout		27,850	62.19	+4.06
Eligible voters		44,779		
Progressive Conservative hold		Swing		–
Source: Elections Ontario

1963 Ontario general election
Party	Candidate	Votes	%
Progressive Conservative	Edward Arunah Dunlop Jr.	9,773	40.57
New Democratic	J. Sydney Midanik	7,667	31.82
Liberal	Douglas Matthews	6,443	26.74
Social Credit	L. Ferris Kendall-Leicester	209	0.87
Total valid votes		24,092	98.73
Total rejected ballots		310	1.27
Turnout		24,402	58.13
Eligible voters		41,975	
Progressive Conservative pickup new district.			
Source: Elections Ontario

== See also ==
- List of Ontario provincial electoral districts
- Canadian provincial electoral districts
