= Sean Conway (Canadian politician) =

Canadian politician and academic

The Honourable Sean Conway OOnt ECO

Ontario Minister of Education
- In office 1985–87, 1989–90
- Premier: David Peterson
- Intervening: Chris Ward
- Preceded by: Larry Grossman
- Succeeded by: Marion Boyd

Member of Ontario Provincial Parliament
- In office 1975–2003
- Preceded by: Maurice Hamilton
- Succeeded by: John Yakabuski
- Constituency: Renfrew—Nipissing—Pembroke (1999–2003); Renfrew North (1975–99)

Personal details
- Born: July 24, 1951 (age 75) Pembroke, Ontario
- Party: Liberal
- Relations: Thomas Patrick Murray, grandfather
- Occupation: Professor, politician
- Awards: Order of Ontario

Sean Conway OOnt (born July 24, 1951) is a former politician in Ontario, Canada and a university professor. He served for 28 years as a Liberal member of the Legislative Assembly of Ontario from 1975 to 2003 and was a high-profile cabinet minister in the government of David Peterson. Following his retirement from the political arena, he served in various academic position in a number of universities.

== Background ==
Conway was born and raised in Barry's Bay. He attended St Joseph's Separate School and Madawaska Valley District High School. He earned his Bachelor of Arts at Waterloo Lutheran University (now Wilfrid Laurier University), and his Masters at Queen's University, both in history. His grandfather, Thomas Patrick Murray, represented Renfrew South for the Liberals from 1929 to 1945.

== Politics ==
In the provincial election of 1975, at age twenty-four, Conway was elected as a Liberal Member of Provincial Parliament (MPP) for the eastern Ontario riding of Renfrew North. He defeated Progressive Conservative candidate Bob Cotnam by 183 votes. The Progressive Conservatives won a minority government in the election, and Conway sat with his party in the opposition benches.

The Liberals increased their parliamentary representation in the 1977 election, although not by enough to form government; Conway was re-elected over Cotnam by an increased margin. He became his party's official Critic for Health following the election and served in this capacity for the entirety of the four-year minority parliament which followed.

The Progressive Conservatives won a majority government in the 1981 provincial election, although Conway was popular enough in his riding to be re-elected by about 2,000 votes.

In March, 1982, newly elected party leader David Peterson named Conway as the party's deputy leader, a role former leader Stuart Smith had left unfilled since the departure of Donald Deacon. In making the appointment, Peterson specifically praised Conway as one of the legislature best orator and pointed to him as an example for his goal of "showing off the energetic young people we have in caucus."

=== In government ===
The provincial election of 1985 resulted in a hung parliament. While the Liberals won the popular vote, the incumbent Progressive Conservatives won four more seats, leaving the New Democratic Party holding the balance of power with twenty-five seats. Conway, by this time regarded as being on the progressive wing of his party, along with Robert Nixon and Ian Scott represented the Liberals in the post-election negotiations with the New Democratic Party (NDP) that led to the written accord that enabled the two parties to join force and to topple the incumbent Progressive Conservative Party, ending its forty-two years of continual rule. In the accord the NDP committed its confidence and supply support to the Liberals for two years in exchange for Peterson Liberals agreement to specific progressive legislative initiatives and not to call a snap election for two years. Throughout Peterson's premiership, Conway, Nixon and Scott were routinely acknowledged as Peterson's most trusted ministers.

On June 26, 1985, Conway was named Ontario's Minister of Education in the new Peterson ministry. In appointing Conway to the education portfolio, Peterson not only entrusted him with the governments second largest budget ministry, he also tasked him to handle what is expected to be the government's most consequential and most contentious policy implementation – to extend full funding for the Roman Catholic school system to the end of secondary school. Conway's grandfather, Thomas Murray, had championed a similar initiative in the 1930s and was disappointed when Mitchell Hepburn backed away from a previous commitment in the face of Protestant opposition. Conway had supported the announcement of full funding by Bill Davis's Progressive Conservative government prior to the 1985 election. Given the complexity of the matter, Peterson informed Conway of his intention to appoint him to the portfolio and instructed him to start receiving briefing even before the government was sworn-in. The implementation was subject to references to both the Court of Appeal for Ontario and the Supreme Court of Canada. Conway was responsible for significantly increasing the actual revenues to the Catholic system after a mathematical error in the Davis government's funding formula came to light. He also guaranteed hiring rights for non-Catholics within the system and exempted non-Catholic children from compulsory religious education in separate high schools.

On June 17, 1986, Conway took on an additional portfolio as Minister of Government Services, a position which he held through the dissolution of parliament in 1987.

Conway was re-elected by a landslide in the 1987 provincial election, in which the Liberals secured a massive majority, winning 95 of the 130 seats. In the post election shuffle in September 1987, he was named Government Government House Leader and Minister of Mines.

In a major shuffle that took place in August 2, 1989, Conway returned to helm the education ministry, and was given two additional portfolios, colleges and universities, the ministry with the fourth largest budget, and the related skills development portfolio. He held these three portfolio concurrently until the end of the Peterson ministry.

=== In opposition ===
Like many others in the Peterson government, Conway opposed holding an early election in 1990 (in fact, he would later reveal that sentiment in the party caucus was almost uniformly against an early trip to the polls). Nonetheless, Peterson called a snap provincial election in 1990, and his party was resoundingly defeated by the NDP. Conway himself was re-elected in a landslide in Renfrew North, where the NDP has a very limited base of historical support. On September 17, 1991, he was chosen as Deputy Leader of the Official Opposition. Conway did not contest the Liberal leadership in 1992.

The Progressive Conservatives under Mike Harris returned to government in the 1995 provincial election with a large majority. Despite the Tories' sweep of much of the province, Conway was re-elected in Renfrew North. In the 1999 election, he was challenged by another incumbent MPP, Progressive Conservative Leo Jordan whose seat was eliminated with a third of his former Lanark–Renfrew electoral district merged into Conway's district. Conway defeated Jordan in the redistributed electoral district of Renfrew--Nipissing--Pembroke by a 53% to 40% margin.

Following Lyn McLeod's resignation as party leader in 1995, Conway publicly declared his intention to run in the summer of 1995, and was widely perceived to have accumulated enough support within the caucus and the wider party to secure victory. He was one of the prospective contestant who sent representatives a preliminary contest planning meeting hosted by the party in early January 1996. He ultimately announced his decision not to enter the contest toward the end of January 1996. Instead Conway supported the bid of Dwight Duncan, a member of the class of '95 MPPs who have publicly previously declared his public support for Conway's prospective bid, in the 1996 Liberal leadership contest. Duncan placed third on the first and second ballots, but fell behind fourth place contender and ultimate victor Dalton McGuinty on the third ballot and was eliminated. Conway continued to serve as Deputy Opposition Leader under McGuinty until December 19, 1996, when he was replaced with Joseph Cordiano.

With the retirement of former finance minister Floyd Laughren in 1998, Conway and NDP member Bud Wildman, both first elected in 1975, became joint-dean of the Ontario legislature. Following Wildman's retirement at the 1999 election, Conway held the distinction as the dean of the legislature for the duration of the 37th Parliament of Ontario.

Having spent more than half his life as an MPP, Conway retired from electoral politics at the 2003 Ontario election. He was succeeded by Progressive Conservative John Yakabuski, a second cousin of his. In a year where the Liberals formed a majority government, Conway's Renfrew--Nipissing--Pembroke was the only seat the party failed to retain.

== After politics ==
Following his departure from the Ontario legislature, Conway was frequently featured in TV Ontario's political discussion panels and served as a public policy advisor with the law firm Gowling Lafleur Henderson LLP.

=== Academic endeavours ===
Conway taught at St. Michael's College at the University of Toronto and at Wilfred Laurier University, the successor institution of his alma mater Waterloo Lutheran University in Waterloo, Ontario. He also held research fellowship at the Centre for Urban Energy at Ryerson University in Toronto, Ontario and at the School of Policy Studies at Queen's University in Kingston, Ontario.

He served as a special assistant to the Principal of Queen's University, Daniel Woolf, and was appointed as the university's acting Vice-Principal (Advancement) in November 2008.

Conway offered significant assistance to former Canadian Prime Minister Paul Martin, in the project to publish Martin's memoirs, Hell Or High Water: My Life In And Out of Politics, which appeared in late 2008. Conway performed many interviews for the National Archives of Canada, which were also utilized for the book.

=== Activities in the Liberal Party ===
Conway remains engaged in activities in support of Liberal politicians in Ontario. He endorsed Sandra Pupatello in the 2013 Ontario Liberal Party leadership contest. In the 2023 leadership contest, he was a prominent backer of Yasir Naqvi, whose campaign issued numerous campaign appeals in his name.

=== Honours ===
In November 2007, Conway was honoured with the Churchill Society Award for Excellence in the Cause of Parliamentary Democracy, a prestigious award normally reserved to prominent political figures in the national arena. Conway was the first recipient who was not a privy councillor. Since the institution of the annual award in 1984, Churchill Society had only conferred the award to three recipients who have neither served in the House of Commons nor as a provincial premier: former Chief Justice of Canada Brian Dickson in 1990, Conway in 2007, and former Attorney General and Chief Justice of Ontario Roy McMurtry in 2016.

Wilfrid Laurier University conferred Conway with a Doctor of Laws degree in 2012.

Conway was appointed to the Order of Ontario as an appointee for 2019. The appointment was announced on New Year's day 2021 with the following citation:

At the age of 24, Sean Conway was one of Ontario's youngest MPPs. He served his upper Ottawa Valley riding for 28 years, captivating members of all parties with his legendary oratory. Through countless contributions as legislator, public policy expert, advisor, educator and author, he has served Ontario with great distinction.

Conway was honoured by his peers with the conferment of the Ontario Association of Former Parliamentarians' Distinguished Service Award in October 2024.

== Public office held ==
Legislative Assembly of Ontario
Preceded by Maurice Hamilton	MPP for Renfrew North/ Renfrew—Nipissing—Pembroke; 1975–2003	Succeeded by John Yakabuski
Peterson ministry, Province of Ontario (1985–1990)
Preceded by Larry Grossman	Minister of Education; 1985–1987	Succeeded by Chris Ward
Preceded by Elinor Caplan	Minister of Government Services; 1986–1987	Succeeded by Richard Patten
Preceded by David Peterson (Note: As Minister of Northern Development and Mines)	Minister of Mines; 1987–1989	Succeeded by Hugh O'Neil
Preceded by Robert Nixon	Government House Leader; 1987–1989	Succeeded by Chris Ward
Preceded by Chris Ward	Minister of Education; 1989–90	Succeeded by Marion Boyd
Preceded by Lyn McLeod	Minister of Colleges and Universities; 1989–90	Succeeded by Richard Allen
Preceded by Alvin Curling	Minister of Skills Development; 1989–90	Succeeded by Richard Allen
Party political offices
Preceded by Donald Deacon (1975)	Deputy Leader of the Ontario Liberal Party; 1982–85, 1991–96	Succeeded by Robert Nixon (1987) as Deputy Premier
Preceded by Robert Nixon (1990) as Deputy Premier	Deputy Leader of the Ontario Liberal Party; 1982–85, 1991–96	Succeeded by Joseph Cordiano
