= John Courtland Bradley =

Canadian politician (1887–1964)

John Bradley

Ontario MPP
- In office 1934–1943
- Preceded by: Edward Arunah Dunlop
- Succeeded by: Stanley Joseph Hunt
- Constituency: Renfrew North

Personal details
- Born: March 10, 1887 Fonaghvale, Ontario
- Died: January 9, 1964 (aged 76) Pembroke, Ontario
- Party: Liberal
- Spouse: Sadie Reid

John Courtland Bradley (March 10, 1887 – January 9, 1964) was a physician and politician in Ontario, Canada. He represented Renfrew North in the Legislative Assembly of Ontario from 1934 to 1943 as a Liberal.

The son of Henry John Bradley and Christina Dewar, he was born in Fonaghvale and was educated in Vankleek Hill and at Toronto University. In 1915, Bradley married Sadie Reid. He served on Pembroke town council, also serving as town mayor, and on Renfrew County council.

Bradley defeated R.E. Davis in 1934 to become the first Liberal elected in Renfrew North since 1908. He was reelected in 1937.

He died in Pembroke at the age of 76.
