= Stanley Joseph Hunt =

Canadian politician (1894–1965)

Ontario MPP
- In office 1943–1958
- Preceded by: John Courtland Bradley
- Succeeded by: Maurice Hamilton
- Constituency: Renfrew North

Personal details
- Born: July 28, 1894; Renfrew County, Ontario
- Died: November 23, 1965 (aged 71); Ottawa, Ontario
- Political party: Progressive Conservative
- Spouse: Rebecca Frances Hamilton
- Occupation: Farmer

Stanley Joseph Hunt (July 28, 1894 – November 23, 1965) was a Canadian politician who was a Member of Provincial Parliament in Legislative Assembly of Ontario from 1943 to 1958. He represented the riding of Renfrew North for the Ontario Progressive Conservative Party.

He was born in Renfrew County, Ontario and was a farmer. He died in 1965.
