= William Balmer McAllister =

Canadian politician

William McAllister

Ontario MPP
- In office 1882–1883
- Preceded by: Thomas Murray
- Succeeded by: Thomas Murray
- Constituency: Renfrew North

Personal details
- Born: January 25, 1840
- Died: May 23, 1918 (aged 78)
- Political party: Conservative
- Spouse: Maria Stewart
- Occupation: Businessman

William Balmer McAllister (January 25, 1840 – May 23, 1918) was an Ontario businessman and political figure. He represented Renfrew North in the Legislative Assembly of Ontario from 1882 to 1883 as a Conservative member.

He was born in Eardley Township. He married Maria Stewart. McAllister was a miller and lumber merchant in Pembroke. He served on the municipal council and school board. In 1882, he was elected to a seat in the provincial assembly by acclamation after Thomas Murray resigned his seat to contest the seat in the federal parliament. McAllister operated Pembroke's first electric light plant which was located on the Muskrat River and he later became a shareholder in the Pembroke Electric Light Company, formed in 1889. With J. H. Metcalfe, McAllister staked a large mining claim in Copper Cliff which they sold to the Canadian Copper Company (later Inco) for $1,200. He was also president of the Pembroke Southern Railway.
