= Maurice Hamilton =

Canadian politician

J. Maurice Hamilton

Ontario MPP
- In office 1958–1975
- Preceded by: Stanley Joseph Hunt
- Succeeded by: Sean Conway
- Constituency: Renfrew North

Personal details
- Born: March 4, 1923 Pembroke, Ontario
- Died: June 24, 1976 (aged 53) Round Lake, Ontario
- Party: Progressive Conservative
- Spouse: Isabel Keuhl
- Occupation: Farmer

J. Maurice Hamilton (March 4, 1923 – June 24, 1976) was a Canadian politician, who represented Renfrew North in the Legislative Assembly of Ontario from 1958 to 1975 as a Progressive Conservative member. He was first elected in a by-election in 1958 and was re-elected in the elections in 1959, 1963, 1967, and 1971. He retired from politics in 1975.

Hamilton was a farmer by profession. He was married to Isabel Keuhl (1926–2006). He was killed in a canoeing accident in 1976. Hamilton is buried in the Calvin United Church & First Presbyterian Cemetery, Laurentian Valley, Renfrew, Ontario.
