= Arunah Dunlop =

Canadian politician

Ontario MPP
- In office 1890–1892
- Preceded by: Thomas Murray
- Succeeded by: Henry Barr
- Constituency: Renfrew North

Personal details
- Born: December 15, 1846 Pembroke, Canada West
- Died: January 1, 1892 (aged 45) Pembroke, Ontario
- Party: Liberal
- Spouse: Mary Ellen Deacon
- Occupation: Merchant

Arunah Dunlop (December 15, 1846 – January 1, 1892) was an Ontario merchant and political figure. He represented Renfrew North in the Legislative Assembly of Ontario as a Conservative member from 1890 to 1892.

He was born in Pembroke and grew up there. In 1874, he married Mary Ellen Deacon. Dunlop sold hardware and lumber. He died in 1892.

== Three generations in legislature ==
While his tenure in the legislature was cut short by his death, it kickstarted a rare three-generation political lineage, with both his son and a grandson elected to the legislature and served in cabinet.

- His son Edward Arunah Dunlop reclaimed the Renfrew North seat through a byelection in 1903, served three non-consecutive stints in the legislature, and joined the ministry of Premier Howard Ferguson in 1929, the third MPP from Renfrew to serve in cabinet. He was promoted to head the Provincial Treasury in 1930, and continued to serve in the role under Premier George Henry until his own passing on New Year's Day of 1934.
- His grandson, also named Edward Arunah Dunlop, who was honoured with both orders of Canada and British Empire and the first President of Toronto Sun, was elected to the legislature as MPP for Forest Hill in 1963 and was appointed a minister without portfolio by Premier Bill Davis in 1971 despite having already announced thg year prior his pending retirement.
