= Alexander Stuart (Canadian politician) =

Canadian politician

Ontario MPP
- In office 1923–1928
- Preceded by: Ralph Warren
- Succeeded by: Edward Arunah Dunlop
- Constituency: Renfrew North

Personal details
- Born: April 19, 1857; Wilberforce Township, Canada West
- Died: April 2, 1928 (aged 70); Renfrew, Ontario
- Political party: Conservative
- Spouse(s): Eliza Jane Burgess (m. 1884), Emma McCabe (m. 1904)
- Occupation: Farmer

Alexander Stuart (April 19, 1857 – April 2, 1928) was an Ontario farmer and political figure. He represented Renfrew North in the Legislative Assembly of Ontario as a Conservative member from 1923 to 1928.

He was born in Wilberforce Township, the son of Charles Stuart. In 1884, he married Eliza Jane Burgess and then married Emma McCabe in 1904 after his first wife's death. He lived near Eganville and served 27 years as reeve for the township. He died at Renfrew on April 2, 1928.
