= John W. Munro =

Canadian politician

Ontario MPP
- In office 1900–1902
- Preceded by: Andrew Thomas White
- Succeeded by: Edward Arunah Dunlop
- Constituency: Renfrew North

Personal details
- Political party: Liberal
- Occupation: Engineer

John W. Munro (September 18, 1849 – May 31, 1902) was a stone mason, building contractor and political figure in Ontario, Canada. He represented Renfrew North in the Legislative Assembly of Ontario from 1900 to 1903 as a Liberal member.

He was born in Inverness, Scotland and grew up in Resolis, Scotland. John was the son of William Henry Munro, and came to Canada West with his family in 1854. Munro worked on the construction of railway bridges on the Canadian Pacific Railway. He also built the Pembroke Post Office, later used as the city hall. Munro was elected in a 1900 by-election held after the death of Andrew Thomas White. He died shortly after the 1902 election from blood poisoning, which stemmed from an ulcerated tooth.
