= Andrew Thomas White =

Canadian politician (died 1900)

Member of the Ontario Provincial Parliament for Renfrew North
- In office March 1, 1898 – May 17, 1900
- Preceded by: Henry Barr
- Succeeded by: John W. Munro

Personal details
- Party: Conservative

Andrew Thomas White (died May 17, 1900) was a Canadian politician from Ontario. He represented Renfrew North in the Legislative Assembly of Ontario from 1898 until his death in 1900.

== See also ==
- 9th Parliament of Ontario
