= Henry Barr =

Canadian politician

Ontario MPP
- In office 1892–1898
- Preceded by: Arunah Dunlop
- Succeeded by: Andrew Thomas White
- Constituency: Renfrew North

Personal details
- Born: March 21, 1844; Horton Township, Renfrew County, Canada West
- Died: July 21, 1926 (aged 82); Renfrew County, Ontario
- Political party: Liberal
- Spouse: Emily Cole
- Occupation: Farmer

Henry Barr (March 21, 1844 – July 21, 1926) was an Ontario farmer and political figure. He represented Renfrew North in the Legislative Assembly of Ontario from 1892 to 1898 as a Liberal member.

He was born in Horton Township, Renfrew County, Canada West in 1844, the son of David Barr. In 1865, he married Emily Cole. Barr was defeated by Arunah Dunlop in 1891 but won the by-election that followed in 1892. He lived near Douglas. He died at Renfrew County in 1926.
