= Thomas Murray (Canadian politician) =

Canadian politician

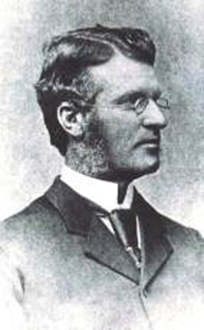
- Portrait of Thomas Murray

Member of Parliament for Renfrew North
- In office 1900–1904
- Preceded by: William Joseph Poupore
- Succeeded by: Gerald Brabazon
- In office 1891–1892
- Preceded by: John Bryson
- Succeeded by: John Bryson

Ontario MPP
- In office 1883–1890
- Preceded by: William Balmer McAllister
- Succeeded by: Arunah Dunlop
- In office 1879–1882
- Preceded by: Thomas Deacon
- Succeeded by: William Balmer McAllister
- In office 1869–1871
- Preceded by: John Supple
- Succeeded by: Thomas Deacon
- Constituency: Renfrew North

Personal details
- Born: January 18, 1836 Goulbourn Township, Upper Canada
- Died: July 29, 1915 (aged 79) Pembroke, Ontario, Canada
- Party: Liberal
- Spouse(s): Jane Copeland(m. 1855), Emma Alice Foran (m. 1901)
- Occupation: Businessman

Thomas Murray (January 18, 1836 – July 29, 1915) was a businessman and political figure in the Ottawa Valley. He represented Renfrew North in the Legislative Assembly of Ontario from 1870 to 1871, from 1879 to 1882 and from 1883 to 1890 and Pontiac in the House of Commons of Canada as a Liberal member in 1891 and 1892 and from 1900 to 1904.

He was born in Goulbourn Township in 1836, the son of James Murray, an Irish immigrant, and Elizabeth Burrows. He was a merchant in Ottawa and then Pembroke, trading in lumber and furs. He served on the town council for Pembroke and also served as reeve. He was elected to the 1st Parliament of Ontario after the death of John Supple; he was defeated in the election that followed in 1871 but elected again in 1879. He resigned his seat in the provincial parliament in 1882 to run unsuccessfully for a seat in the federal parliament; he was reelected in 1883. His younger brother William represented Renfrew North in the House of Commons. In 1884, Thomas and William registered a claim on a nickel deposit near Sudbury which became the Murray Mine, the first nickel mine established in the area.

Murray was married twice: to Jane Copeland in 1855 and to Emma Alice Foran in 1901. He died in Pembroke at the age of 79.

== Electoral history ==
=== Federal ===
1872 Canadian federal election: Pontiac
Party	Candidate	Votes	%
Liberal–Conservative	William McKay Wright	1,604	54.80
Unknown	Thomas Murray	1,323	45.20
Total valid votes		2,927	100.00
Source: Canadian Elections Database

1878 Canadian federal election: Pontiac
Party	Candidate	Votes	%
Conservative	John Poupore	1,381	54.05
Unknown	Thomas Murray	1,174	45.95
Total valid votes		2,555	100.00

1891 Canadian federal election: Pontiac
Party	Candidate	Votes	%	±%
Liberal	Thomas Murray	1,100	41.01	+4.52
Unknown	H.M. McLean	795	29.64	
Conservative	John Bryson	787	29.34	-34.16
Total valid votes		2,682	100.00	

By-election on 26 June 1892 On election being declared void, 9 May 1892
Party	Candidate	Votes
Conservative	John Bryson	??
Liberal	Thomas Murray	??

1900 Canadian federal election: Pontiac
Party	Candidate	Votes	%	±%
Liberal	Thomas Murray	1,798	52.65	+12.27
Conservative	Gerald Hugh Brabazon	1,617	47.35	-12.27
Total valid votes		3,415	100.00	

=== Provincial ===
Ontario provincial by-election, October 22, 1869: Renfrew North Resignation of John Supple
Party	Candidate	Votes	%	±%
Liberal	Thomas Murray	518	53.40	+25.23
Conservative	Thomas Deacon	452	46.60	−25.14
Total valid votes		970	100.0	−13.24
Liberal gain from Conservative		Swing		+25.18
Source: History of the Electoral Districts, Legislatures and Ministries of the Province of Ontario

1871 Ontario general election: Renfrew North
Party	Candidate	Votes	%	±%
Conservative	Thomas Deacon	640	56.74	+11.67
Liberal	Thomas Murray	488	43.26	−11.67
Turnout		1,128	74.31	19.62
Eligible voters		1,518		
Conservative gain from Liberal		Swing		+11.67
Source: Elections Ontario

1879 Ontario general election: Renfrew North
Party	Candidate	Votes	%	±%
Liberal	Thomas Murray	1,066	52.56	+6.00
Conservative	Thomas Deacon	962	47.44	−6.00
Total valid votes		2,028	72.07	−4.64
Eligible voters		2,814		
Liberal gain from Conservative		Swing		+6.00
Source: Elections Ontario
