= Norman Reid (politician) =

Canadian politician from Ontario

Member of the Ontario Provincial Parliament for Renfrew North
- In office June 8, 1908 – November 13, 1911
- Preceded by: Edward Arunah Dunlop
- Succeeded by: Edward Arunah Dunlop

Personal details
- Party: Liberal

Norman Reid was a Canadian politician from Ontario. He represented Renfrew North in the Legislative Assembly of Ontario from 1908 to 1911.

== See also ==
- 12th Parliament of Ontario
