= Murray Mine =

Defunct mine in Greater Sudbury, Ontario

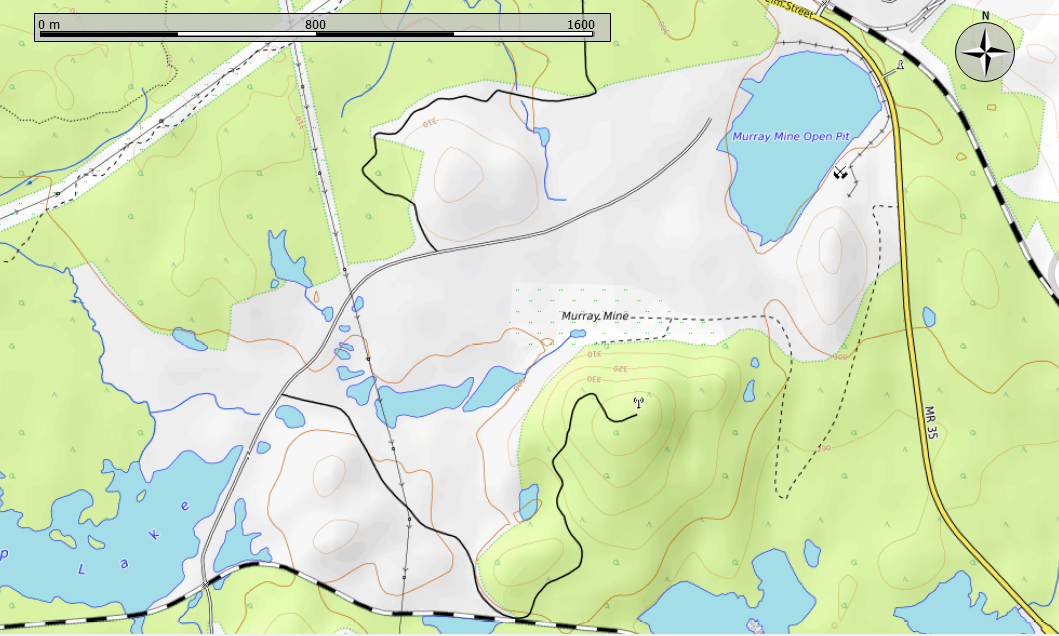
- Map showing the mine location, the open pit and the rail lines in the area.
- Interactive map of Murray Mine
- Location: Greater Sudbury, Ontario, Canada; 46.5144°N 81.0657°W
- Products: Nickel and copper ore
- Type: Underground and open pit
- Discovered: 1883
- Opened: 1889
- Active: 1889–94; 1916–21; 1923–23; 1950–71
- Closed: 1971

The Murray Mine is a defunct nickel and copper mine in Greater Sudbury, Ontario. It was the site of the original ore discovery that led to the launch of mining operations in the Sudbury Basin area.

The Murray Mine was discovered in August 1883 by Thomas Flanagan, a blacksmith on the CPR construction gang. The property at Lot 11, Concession V, McKim Township, was patented to James Loghrin, Henry Abbott and Thomas and William Murray in October 1884. They in turn sold it to Henry Hussey Vivian and Co. of Swansea, Wales, who worked it from 1889 to 1894 when the mine was closed down.

The British American Nickel Corporation (BANCo) purchased the property in 1912, sinking the shaft to a depth of 700 feet by the time the mine closed in August 1914. The mine reopened in August 1916 and dewatered, the shaft had been deepened to 1,075' by 1920. Murray Mine shut down in February 1921, in that period 277,484 tons of ore had been shipped. Reopening in 1923 the mine produced 267,535 tons before the mine again closed in July 1924 due to the liquidation of BANCo.

INCO purchased the Murray Mine from the bondholders of the defunct BANCo in 1925. No. 2 Shaft was sunk between 1941 and 1943. Production was continuous from 1950 to 1971 when the mine was last worked.

The Murray Mine site is located on Municipal Road 35 between Godfrey Road and Azilda. A historical plaque commemorates the site.

== See also ==
- List of mines in Ontario
