= Edward Arunah Dunlop Jr. =

Canadian politician

Edward Dunlop

Ontario MPP
- In office 1963–1971
- Preceded by: New riding
- Succeeded by: Philip Givens
- Constituency: York-Forest Hill; Forest Hill (1963-1967)

Personal details
- Born: June 27, 1919 Pembroke, Ontario
- Died: January 6, 1981 (aged 61) Toronto, Ontario
- Party: Progressive Conservative
- Spouse: Dorothy Tupper
- Children: 2
- Occupation: Civil servant
- Portfolio: Minister without portfolio (March–October 1971)

Military service
- Allegiance: Canadian
- Branch/service: Canadian Army
- Years of service: 1937-1946
- Rank: Major
- Unit: The Queen's Own Rifles of Canada
- Awards: George Medal, Order of the British Empire

Edward Arunah Dunlop, CM, OBE, GM (June 27, 1919 – January 6, 1981) was a politician in Ontario, Canada. He was a Progressive Conservative member of the Legislative Assembly of Ontario from 1963 to 1971 who represented the Toronto ridings of Forest Hill and then York-Forest Hill. He briefly served as a cabinet minister in the government of Bill Davis.

== Background ==
He was born in Pembroke, Ontario, the son of Edward Arunah Dunlop, and educated at Upper Canada College and the University of Toronto. His father served as an MPP for nearly 20 years and was provincial treasurer in the 1930s. His grandfather, Arunah Dunlop was an MPP in the 1890s and his great uncle was a member in the 1870s. He married Dorothy Joyce Tupper, the granddaughter of Sir Charles Hibbert Tupper, in 1944. They had two children, Edward (Ted) and Charlotte. Dunlop served with The Queen's Own Rifles of Canada from 1937 to 1944, reaching the rank of major. He was blinded in 1943 after attempting to dispose of a grenade dropped by another soldier during a training exercise. Dunlop became an officer of the Order of the British Empire in 1946.

He went on to serve as director of the Casualty Rehabilitation Division of the Department of Veterans Affairs. He was the first president for the Toronto Sun. Dunlop was also national director for the Canadian Arthritis and Rheumatism Society (CARS) and served on the national council for the CNIB. He was named a member of the Order of Canada in 1980.

He died from cancer in 1981, at the age of 61.

== Politics ==
In the 1963 provincial election, Dunlop ran as the Progressive Conservative candidate in the Toronto of Forest Hill Kent West. He defeated NDP candidate Stan Midacik by 2,273 votes. In 1967, his riding was renamed as York-Forest Hill even though the boundaries remained the same. He defeated NDP candidate Leon Kumove by 3,649 votes. He served as a backbench supporter of the government of John Robarts. During his tenure, he served as chair of the Standing Committee on Privileges and Elections and as chair of the Select Committee on redrafting the provinces election laws. He was one of the few Conservative MPPs to vote against the party on what he called a matter of principle. He was against the "wishy-washy" practice of abstaining from controversial votes.

In 1971, when Bill Davis became Premier, he was appointed to cabinet as a Minister without portfolio. Dunlop announced his retirement from politics in May 1970, well before his appointment to cabinet. He said that two terms was "a sufficient part of a man's career." He wanted to devoted more time to his job as director of CARS and spend more time with his family.
