= John Supple =

Canadian politician

Ontario MPP
- In office 1867–1869
- Preceded by: New riding
- Succeeded by: Thomas Murray
- Constituency: Renfrew North

Legislative Assembly of the Province of Canada
- In office 1856–1857
- Preceded by: Francis Hincks
- Succeeded by: John Lorn McDougall Sr.
- Constituency: Renfrew County, Province of Canada

Personal details
- Born: 1810; Ireland
- Died: 1869 (aged 58–59); Pembroke, Ontario
- Political party: Conservative
- Profession: Businessman

John Supple (ca 1810 – 1869) was an Ontario businessman and political figure. He represented Renfrew North in the 1st Parliament of Ontario as a Conservative member from 1867 to 1869.

He was born in Ireland around 1810. Supple was a lumber merchant in the Pembroke area and a director of the Upper Ottawa Steamboat Company. He was elected in an 1856 by-election to represent Renfrew in the Legislative Assembly of the Province of Canada and was elected to represent Renfrew North in the provincial legislature after Confederation. His former estate is now the site of the city hall in Pembroke.

== Electoral history ==
1867 Ontario general election: Renfrew North
Party	Candidate	Votes	%
Conservative	John Supple	802	71.74
Liberal	Mr. McAdam	315	28.18
Independent	Mr. Shaw	1	0.09
Total valid votes		1,118	80.26
Eligible voters		1,393	
Conservative pickup new district.			
Source: Elections Ontario
