= Edward Arunah Dunlop =

Canadian politician

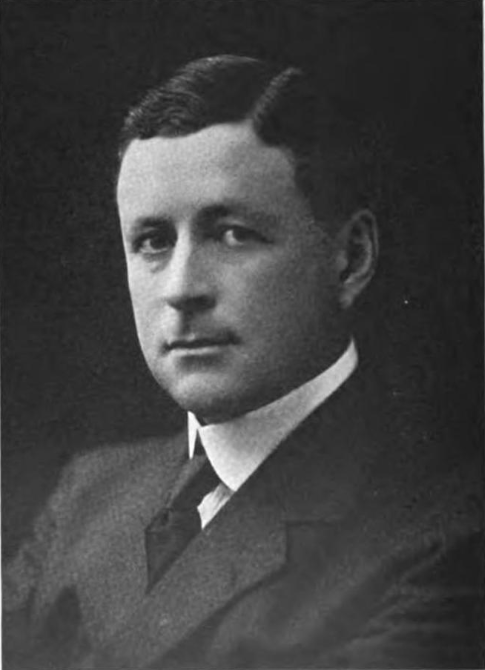

Ontario MPP
- In office 1928–1934
- Preceded by: Alexander Stuart
- Succeeded by: John Courtland Bradley
- In office 1911–1919
- Preceded by: Norman Reid
- Succeeded by: Ralph Warren
- In office 1903–1908
- Preceded by: John W. Munro
- Succeeded by: Norman Reid
- Constituency: Renfrew North

Personal details
- Born: October 26, 1876; Pembroke, Ontario, Canada
- Died: January 1, 1934 (aged 57); Toronto, Ontario, Canada
- Political party: Conservative
- Spouse: Mabel Ferguson
- Occupation: Merchant

Edward Arunah Dunlop (October 26, 1876 – January 1, 1934) was a Canadian industrialist and politician. He served as a Conservative member of the Legislative Assembly of Ontario for Renfrew North three separate times - from 1903 to 1908, 1911 to 1919 and 1928 to 1934. He served as provincial treasurer from 1930 to 1933.

Dunlop was born in Pembroke, Ontario, the son of Arunah Dunlop and Mary Ellen Deacon. Dunlop worked as a clerk in his father's hardware business for five years, becoming owner in 1897. He served on the town council for Pembroke. In 1908, he married Mabel Ferguson. Dunlop was president of the Pembroke Lumber Company and the Pembroke Electric Light Company. He also was a director of the Eddy Match Company. Dunlop served as a Minister Without Portfolio from 1929 to 1930 and was a member of various committees, including the Standing Committee of Public Accounts. He died in 1934.

His son, also named Edward Arunah Dunlop, also served in the Ontario assembly.
