= Wardrope =

Wardrope can refer to:

== People ==
- David Wardrope Wallace
- George Wardrope
- Thomas Wardrope Eadie
- Willie Wardrope, Scottish footballer

== Other ==
- Wardrope is the name of a track in the 1996 Hooverphonic album A New Stereophonic Sound Spectacular
