= William Craig (Canadian politician) =

Canadian politician

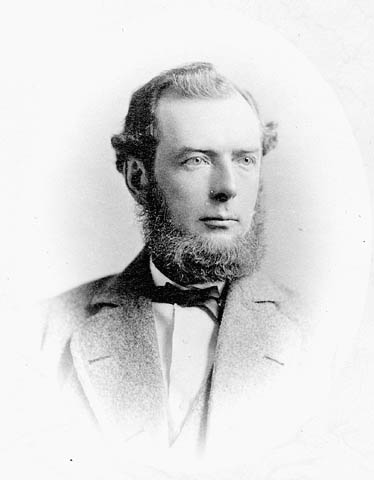

Ontario MPP
- In office 1867–1874
- Preceded by: Riding established
- Succeeded by: Adam J. Baker
- Constituency: Russell

Personal details
- Born: May 16, 1816 Bytown, Upper Canada
- Died: January 1, 1897 (aged 68) Russell Township, Ontario
- Party: Conservative

William Craig (May 16, 1828 – January 1, 1897) was an Ontario political figure. He represented Russell in the Legislative Assembly of Ontario as a Conservative member from 1867 to 1874.

He was born in Bytown in 1828, the son of an Irish immigrant, and educated in Nepean. He served as warden for the counties of Prescott and Russell and reeve for Russell Township. He died in Russell in 1897.

== Electoral history ==
1871 Ontario general election: Russell
Party	Candidate	Votes	%	±%
Conservative	William Craig	773	51.29	−14.04
Liberal	Ira Morgan	727	48.24	+24.43
Independent	Mr. Hely	7	0.46	
Turnout		1,507	56.15	−12.80
Eligible voters		2,684		
Conservative hold		Swing		−19.24
Source: Elections Ontario

1867 Ontario general election: Russell
Party	Candidate	Votes	%
Conservative	William Craig	1,287	65.33
Liberal	J.L. O'Hanley	469	23.81
Independent	R. Sparks	214	10.86
Total valid votes		1,970	68.95
Eligible voters		2,857	
Conservative pickup new district.			
Source: Elections Ontario
