= Nault =

Nault is a surname. Notable people with the surname include:

- Bob Nault (born 1955), Canadian politician
- Fernand Nault (1920–2006), Canadian dancer and choreographer
- Joseph Daniel Nault (1888–1954), Canadian politician
- Marie-Ève Nault (born 1982), Canadian soccer player
