= James Grant (Ontario politician) =

Canadian politician

Sir James Alexander Grant KCMG FRSC
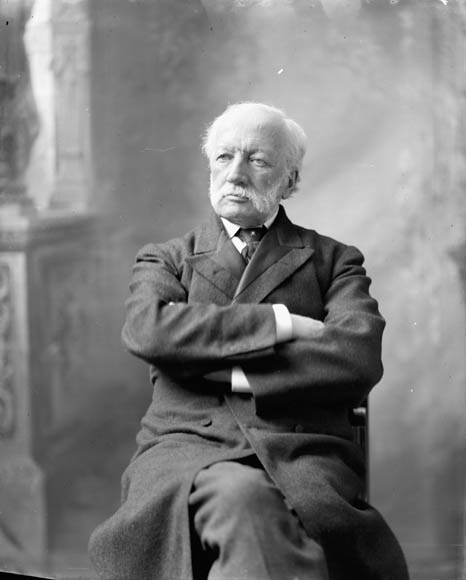

Member of the Canadian Parliament for Russell
- In office 1867–1874
- Succeeded by: Robert Blackburn

Member of the Canadian Parliament for City of Ottawa
- In office 1893–1896
- Preceded by: Honoré Robillard
- Succeeded by: William H. Hutchison

Personal details
- Born: August 11, 1831 Inverness, Scotland
- Died: February 5, 1920 (aged 88) Ottawa, Ontario, Canada
- Party: Conservative

Sir James Alexander Grant KCMG FRSC (August 11, 1831 – February 5, 1920) was an Ontario physician and political figure. He represented Russell in the House of Commons of Canada as a Conservative Party of Canada member from 1867 to 1874; he also represented the City of Ottawa in the federal parliament from 1893 to 1896.

He was born in Inverness, Scotland, in 1829, the son of James Grant and Jane Ord, and came to Canada with his parents in 1830. He studied at the University of Queen's College and then studied medicine at McGill College, becoming an M.D. in 1854. In 1856, he married Maria, the daughter of Edward Malloch. Grant served as the first president of the Canadian Association for the Prevention of Consumption and Other Forms of Tuberculosis (later the Canadian Lung Association), president of the College of Surgeons of Ontario and was also president of the Mechanics' Institute and Athenaeum of Ottawa. He published a number of articles in medical journals in England and Canada. Grant served as physician to several Governors General from 1867 to 1905. He was a Fellow of the Royal College of Physicians and a member of the Geological Society of England. He was named a KCMG in 1887. He died in Ottawa at the age of 88.

== Archives ==
There is a James Alexander Grant fonds at Library and Archives Canada. Archival reference number is R5173.

== Electoral records ==
1867 Canadian federal election: Russell
Party	Candidate	Votes
Conservative	James Grant	1,293
Unknown	Robert Bell	695

1872 Canadian federal election: Russell
Party	Candidate	Votes
Conservative	James Grant	1,217
Liberal	Malcolm Cameron	952
Source: Canadian Elections Database

1874 Canadian federal election: Russell
Party	Candidate	Votes
Liberal	Robert Blackburn	1,078
Conservative	James Grant	1,014
Unknown	W. R. Bell	95
Source: Canadian Elections Database

Coat of arms of James Grant
Crest A demi-savage Proper. Escutcheon Gules three antique crowns Or within a bordure chequy of the second and first. Motto I'll Stand Sure

Professional and academic associations
Preceded by James Loudon	President of the Royal Society of Canada; 1902–1903	Succeeded by George Taylor Denison III
