= Romeo Bégin =

Canadian politician

Ontario MPP
- In office 1937–1948
- Preceded by: Arthur Desrosiers
- Succeeded by: Joseph Daniel Nault
- Constituency: Russell

Personal details
- Born: December 12, 1895; Vanier, Ontario
- Died: 1972
- Political party: Liberal
- Spouse: Anne Carle
- Profession: Businessman

Romeo Bégin (born 12 December 1895 – 1972) was an Ontario political figure. He represented Russell in the Legislative Assembly of Ontario as a Liberal from 1937 to 1948.

He was born in Eastview in 1895, the son of Joseph Bégin. In 1923, he married Anna Carle. Bégin served as treasurer for Eastview for fifteen years. He was also director of the Eastview Bus Service.
