= Charles Murphy (Canadian politician) =

Canadian lawyer, politician

The Honourable Charles Murphy PC
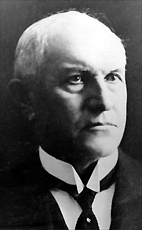
- The Honourable Charles Murphy, PC

Secretary of State for External Affairs
- In office 19 May 1909 – 6 October 1911
- Prime Minister: Wilfrid Laurier
- Preceded by: position established
- Succeeded by: William James Roche

Secretary of State for Canada
- In office 9 October 1908 – 6 October 1911
- Prime Minister: Wilfrid Laurier
- Preceded by: Richard William Scott
- Succeeded by: William James Roche
- In office 13 November 1925 – 23 March 1926 (Acting)
- Prime Minister: W. L. Mackenzie King
- Preceded by: Walter Edward Foster
- Succeeded by: Ernest Lapointe (Acting)

Postmaster General of Canada
- In office 29 December 1921 – 28 June 1926
- Prime Minister: W. L. Mackenzie King
- Preceded by: Louis de Gonzague Belley
- Succeeded by: Robert James Manion

Member of Parliament for Russell
- In office 1908–1925
- Preceded by: Norman Frank Wilson
- Succeeded by: Alfred Goulet

Canadian Senator from Ontario
- In office 5 September 1925 – 24 November 1935
- Nominated by: W. L. Mackenzie King
- Appointed by: The Viscount Byng of Vimy

Personal details
- Born: 8 December 1862 Ottawa, Canada West
- Died: 24 November 1935 (aged 72) Ottawa, Ontario, Canada
- Party: Liberal Party of Canada; Laurier Liberal
- Parents: James Murphy (father); Mary Conway (mother)
- Occupation: Lawyer

Charles Murphy PC (8 December 1862 – 24 November 1935) was a Canadian politician.

== Early life ==
He was born on 8 December 1862 in Ottawa, the son of James Murphy, who came to Ontario from Ireland, and Mary Conway. Murphy studied at Ottawa University and Osgoode Hall, was called to the Ontario bar in 1891 and practised law in Ottawa.

== Political career ==
Murphy was elected as a Liberal MP for Russell (Ontario) in the House of Commons of Canada from 1908 to 1925.

He held several cabinet positions in the Laurier and King governments, including Secretary of State for External Affairs (1909–1911), Postmaster General (1921–1926) and acting Secretary of State of Canada (1925–1926).

In 1917, a group of Irish Catholics including Chief Justice Charles Fitzpatrick, Justice Francis Alexander Anglin, Minister of Justice Charles Doherty, and Murphy urged Prime Minister Robert Borden to pressure the United Kingdom to permit home rule for Ireland.

He was later appointed to the Senate of Canada in 1925.

== Later life and death ==
He died in office in Ottawa in 1935, at the age of 72.

There is a Charles Murphy fonds at Library and Archives Canada.

== Electoral record ==
1908 Canadian federal election: Russell
Party	Candidate	Votes
Liberal	Charles Murphy	3,616
Conservative	John A. Gamble	2,470

1911 Canadian federal election: Russell
Party	Candidate	Votes
Liberal	Charles Murphy	3,812
Conservative	Joseph Ulric Vincent	2,836

1917 Canadian federal election: Russell
Party	Candidate	Votes
Opposition (Laurier Liberals)	Charles Murphy	5,895
Government (Unionist)	Duncan Cameron Merkley	3,768

1921 Canadian federal election: Russell
Party	Candidate	Votes
Liberal	Charles Murphy	9,069
Progressive	Marshall Rathwell	6,836

By-election: On Mr. Murphy being appointed Postmaster General, 19 January 1921
Party	Candidate	Votes
Liberal	Charles Murphy	acclaimed
