= Alfred Goulet =

Canadian politician

Member of Parliament for Russell
- In office 1925–1945
- Preceded by: Charles Murphy
- Succeeded by: Joseph-Omer Gour

Ontario MPP
- In office 1922–1923
- Preceded by: Damase Racine
- Succeeded by: Aurélien Bélanger
- Constituency: Russell

Personal details
- Born: June 5, 1875 Wendover, Ontario, Canada
- Died: March 17, 1961 (aged 85)
- Party: Liberal
- Spouse: Florendie Sirois (m. 1896)
- Occupation: Businessman

Alfred Goulet (June 5, 1875 – March 17, 1961) was a Canadian businessman and political figure in Ontario. He represented Russell in the Legislative Assembly of Ontario from 1922 to 1923 and Russell in the House of Commons of Canada from 1925 to 1945 as a Liberal member.

He was born in Wendover, Ontario in 1875, the son of Godfrey Goulet and Maximilienne Boyer, and studied at the University of Ottawa. He married Florendie Sirois in 1896. He owned a general store. Goulet served on the council for Clarence Township and was township reeve. He was elected to the Ontario assembly in a 1922 by-election held after the death of Damase Racine and was elected to the federal parliament in 1925.

== Electoral record ==
1925 Canadian federal election: Russell
Party	Candidate	Votes
Liberal	Alfred Goulet	8,419
Conservative	Duncan Cameron Merkley	6,328

1926 Canadian federal election: Russell
Party	Candidate	Votes
Liberal	Alfred Goulet	9,062
Conservative	Wilfrid Thivierge	4,876

1930 Canadian federal election: Russell
Party	Candidate	Votes
Liberal	Alfred Goulet	9,551
Conservative	Alexandre Marion	7,964

1935 Canadian federal election: Russell
Party	Candidate	Votes
Liberal	Alfred Goulet	5,041
Independent	John Rudolphus Booth	2,897
Reconstruction	Marshall Rathwell	1,423
Conservative	Mathias Landry	1,368
Independent	Joseph Alvary Brisson	862

1940 Canadian federal election: Russell
Party	Candidate	Votes
Liberal	Alfred Goulet	6,045
National Government	Frederic-A. Caillier	2,961
