= Langelier =

Langelier may refer to:

== Places ==
- a former name of Québec (electoral district), a federal electoral district in Canada
- Langelier, Quebec, renamed to (the municipality of) La Croche in 1999
- Langelier (Montreal Metro), a station on the Montreal Metro (subway)
- 33 Langelier, a bus route in Montreal
- Carrefour Langelier, a shopping mall in Montreal

== Other uses ==
- Langelier (surname)
- Langelier Saturation Index, a measure of the calcium carbonate stability of water
- The Langoliers, a novella and miniseries written by Stephen King
