= Russell (Ontario provincial electoral district) =

Ontario electoral district

Defunct provincial electoral district
- Legislature: Legislative Assembly of Ontario
- District created: 1867
- District abolished: 1966
- First contested: 1867
- Last contested: 1963

Demographics
- Census division(s): Prescott and Russell United Counties, Carleton County
- Census subdivision(s): Cumberland, Osgoode, Gloucester, Ottawa, Eastview, Rockcliffe Park, Russell (until 1934), Clarence (until 1934), Cambridge Twp (until 1934), Casselman (until 1934), Rockland (until 1934)

Russell was an electoral riding in Ontario, Canada. It was created in 1867 at the time of confederation and was abolished in 1966 before the 1967 election.

== Members of Provincial Parliament ==
Russell
| Assembly | Years | Member | Party |
|---|---|---|---|
| 1st | 1867–1871 | William Craig | Conservative |
| 2nd | 1871–1875 | William Craig | Conservative |
| 3rd | 1875–1879 | Adam J. Baker | Conservative |
| 4th | 1879–1883 | Adam J. Baker | Conservative |
| 5th | 1883–1886 | Honoré Robillard | Conservative |
| 6th | 1886–1890 | Alexander Robillard | Liberal |
| 7th | 1890–1894 | Alexander Robillard | Liberal |
| 8th | 1894–1898 | Alexander Robillard | Liberal |
| 9th | 1898–1902 | Onésime Guibord | Liberal |
| 10th | 1902–1904 | Onésime Guibord | Liberal |
| 11th | 1905–1908 | Damase Racine | Liberal |
| 12th | 1908–1911 | Damase Racine | Liberal |
| 13th | 1911–1914 | Damase Racine | Liberal |
| 14th | 1914–1919 | Damase Racine | Liberal |
| 15th | 1919–1921 | Damase Racine | Liberal |
| 15th | 1922–1923 | Alfred Goulet | Liberal |
| 16th | 1923–1926 | Aurélien Bélanger | Liberal |
| 17th | 1926–1929 | Aurélien Bélanger | Liberal |
| 18th | 1929–1934 | Charles Avila Séguin | Conservative |
| 19th | 1934–1937 | Arthur Desrosiers | Liberal |
| 20th | 1937–1943 | Romeo Bégin | Liberal |
| 21st | 1943–1945 | Romeo Bégin | Liberal |
| 22nd | 1945–1948 | Romeo Bégin | Liberal |
| 23rd | 1948–1951 | Joseph Daniel Nault | Progressive Conservative |
| 24th | 1951–1954 | Joseph Daniel Nault | Progressive Conservative |
| 24th | 1954–1955 | Gordon Lavergne | Progressive Conservative |
| 25th | 1955–1959 | Gordon Lavergne | Progressive Conservative |
| 26th | 1959–1963 | Gordon Lavergne | Progressive Conservative |
| 27th | 1963–1967 | Bert Lawrence | Progressive Conservative |
Sourced from the Ontario Legislative Assembly
Redistributed into Prescott and Russell, Carleton East, Ottawa South and Ottawa East before the 1967 election

== Election results ==
1963 Ontario general election
| Party | Candidate | Votes | % | ±% |
|---|---|---|---|---|
| Progressive Conservative | Bert Lawrence | 13,661 | 40.42 | -13.76 |
| Liberal | Frederick Barrett | 13,317 | 39.40 | -1.39 |
| Independent | Gordon Lavergne | 5,190 | 15.36 | |
| New Democratic | Peter D'Aoust | 1,632 | 4.83 | -0.20 |
| Total valid votes | | 33,800 | | |
| Progressive Conservative hold | | Swing | | -6.19 |

1959 Ontario general election
| Party | Candidate | Votes | % | ±% |
|---|---|---|---|---|
| Progressive Conservative | Gordon Lavergne | 13,940 | 54.18 | -11.09 |
| Liberal | Frederick Barrett | 10,495 | 40.79 | +6.06 |
| Co-operative Commonwealth | Denis Kalman | 1,294 | 5.03 | |
| Total valid votes | | 25,729 | | |
| Progressive Conservative hold | | Swing | | -8.57 |

1955 Ontario general election
| Party | Candidate | Votes | % | ±% |
|---|---|---|---|---|
| Progressive Conservative | Gordon Lavergne | 10,392 | 65.27 | +5.77 |
| Liberal | Raphael Pilon | 5,530 | 34.73 | -0.46 |
| Total valid votes | | 15,922 | | |
| Progressive Conservative hold | | Swing | | +3.11 |

Ontario provincial by-election, 16 September 1954
| Party | Candidate | Votes | % | ±% |
|---|---|---|---|---|
| Progressive Conservative | Gordon Lavergne | 9,701 | 59.50 | +15.19 |
| Liberal | Raphael Pilon | 5,738 | 35.19 | -9.05 |
| Co-operative Commonwealth | George A. Hay | 865 | 5.31 | -6.14 |
| Total valid votes | | 16,304 | | |
| Progressive Conservative hold | | Swing | | +12.12 |

1951 Ontario general election
| Party | Candidate | Votes | % | ±% |
|---|---|---|---|---|
| Progressive Conservative | J. Daniel Nault | 6,946 | 44.31 | +2.42 |
| Liberal | Raoul Landreault | 6,936 | 44.25 | +7.87 |
| Co-operative Commonwealth | Wesley McCullough | 1,794 | 11.44 | -1.31 |
| Total valid votes | | 15,676 | | |
| Progressive Conservative hold | | Swing | | -2.73 |

1948 Ontario general election
| Party | Candidate | Votes | % | ±% |
|---|---|---|---|---|
| Progressive Conservative | J. Daniel Nault | 5,292 | 41.89 | +4.69 |
| Liberal | Romeo Bégin | 4,595 | 36.38 | -13.57 |
| Co-operative Commonwealth | George Lyon | 1,611 | 12.75 | +4.35 |
| Union of Electors | Cécile Brunet | 1,134 | 8.98 | |
| Total valid votes | | 12,632 | | |
| Progressive Conservative gain from Liberal | | Swing | | +9.13 |

1945 Ontario general election
| Party | Candidate | Votes | % | ±% |
|---|---|---|---|---|
| Liberal | Romeo Bégin | 5,925 | 49.94 | -6.56 |
| Progressive Conservative | Duncan Cameron Merkley | 4,414 | 37.20 | +8.26 |
| Co-operative Commonwealth | Paul Sabourin | 997 | 8.40 | -6.15 |
| Independent | Edward Lavergne | 528 | 4.45 | |
| Total valid votes | | 11,864 | | |
| Liberal hold | | Swing | | -7.41 |

1943 Ontario general election
| Party | Candidate | Votes | % | ±% |
|---|---|---|---|---|
| Liberal | Romeo Bégin | 4,092 | 56.50 | -2.14 |
| Progressive Conservative | Lorenzo Lafleur | 2,096 | 28.94 | +1.20 |
| Co-operative Commonwealth | Robert McConnell | 1,054 | 14.55 | |
| Total valid votes | | 7,242 | | |
| Liberal hold | | Swing | | -1.67 |

1937 Ontario general election
| Party | Candidate | Votes | % | ±% |
|---|---|---|---|---|
| Liberal | Romeo Bégin | 6,481 | 58.65 | +4.09 |
| Conservative | Joseph Cyr | 3,066 | 27.74 | -1.41 |
| Independent | Philip Proudfoot | 1,504 | 13.61 | |
| Total valid votes | | 11,051 | | |
| Liberal hold | | Swing | | +2.75 |

1934 Ontario general election
| Party | Candidate | Votes | % | ±% |
|---|---|---|---|---|
| Liberal | Arthur des Rosiers | 6,381 | 54.55 | +5.76 |
| Conservative | Charles A. Seguin | 3,410 | 29.15 | -22.05 |
| Independent | Marshall Rathwell | 1,906 | 16.29 | |
| Total valid votes | | 11,697 | | |
| Liberal gain from Conservative | | Swing | | +13.90 |

1929 Ontario general election
| Party | Candidate | Votes | % | ±% |
|---|---|---|---|---|
| Conservative | Charles A. Seguin | 6,190 | 51.20 | +16.34 |
| Liberal | Aurelien Belanger | 5,899 | 48.80 | +26.43 |
| Total valid votes | | 12,089 | | |
| Conservative gain from Independent | | Swing | | +29.56 |

1926 Ontario general election
| Party | Candidate | Votes | % | ±% |
|---|---|---|---|---|
| Independent | Aurelien Belanger | 5,213 | 42.78 | |
| Conservative | Charles A. Seguin | 4,248 | 34.86 | |
| Liberal | John G. Carkner | 2,725 | 22.36 | -50.58 |
| Total valid votes | | 12,186 | | |
| Independent gain from Liberal | | Swing | | +46.68 |

1923 Ontario general election
| Party | Candidate | Votes | % | ±% |
|---|---|---|---|---|
| Liberal | Aurelien Belanger | 4,648 | 72.94 | +8.57 |
| United Farmers | L. A. Landry | 1,724 | 27.06 | -4.98 |
| Total valid votes | | 6,372 | | |
| Liberal hold | | Swing | | +6.78 |

Ontario provincial by-election, 23 October 1922
| Party | Candidate | Votes | % | ±% |
|---|---|---|---|---|
| Liberal | Alfred Goulet | 4,266 | 64.37 | +14.40 |
| United Farmers | Philias Blanchard | 2,123 | 32.04 | -8.35 |
| Unknown | Robert J. Bowen | 238 | 3.59 | |
| Total valid votes | | 6,627 | | |
| Liberal hold | | Swing | | +11.38 |

1919 Ontario general election
| Party | Candidate | Votes | % | ±% |
|---|---|---|---|---|
| Liberal | Damase Racine | 6,121 | 49.98 | -23.06 |
| United Farmers | Philias Blanchard | 4,947 | 40.39 | |
| Independent | S. A. Landry | 1,180 | 9.63 | |
| Total valid votes | | 12,248 | | |
| Liberal hold | | Swing | | -31.72 |
"Elections Ontario Data Explorer". Elections Ontario.

1914 Ontario general election
| Party | Candidate | Votes | % | ±% |
|---|---|---|---|---|
| Liberal | Damase Racine | 3,851 | 73.10 | +8.94 |
| Conservative | Elisse J. Lavadure | 1,417 | 26.90 | -8.94 |
| Total valid votes | | 5,268 | | |
| Liberal hold | | Swing | | +8.94 |
"Elections Ontario Data Explorer". Elections Ontario.

1911 Ontario general election
| Party | Candidate | Votes | % | ±% |
|---|---|---|---|---|
| Liberal | Damase Racine | 3,041 | 64.16 | +5.43 |
| Conservative | W. J. W. Lowrie | 1,699 | 35.84 | -5.43 |
| Total valid votes | | 4,740 | | |
| Liberal hold | | Swing | | +5.43 |

1908 Ontario general election
| Party | Candidate | Votes | % | ±% |
|---|---|---|---|---|
| Liberal | Damase Racine | 2,642 | 58.72 | -0.82 |
| Conservative | Wilfrid Thivierge | 1,857 | 41.28 | +0.82 |
| Total valid votes | | 4,499 | | |
| Liberal hold | | Swing | | -0.82 |

1905 Ontario general election
| Party | Candidate | Votes | % | ±% |
|---|---|---|---|---|
| Liberal | Damase Racine | 2,557 | 59.55 | +0.09 |
| Conservative | J. L. Rolston | 1,737 | 40.45 | -0.09 |
| Total valid votes | | 4,294 | | |
| Liberal hold | | Swing | | +0.09 |

1902 Ontario general election
| Party | Candidate | Votes | % | ±% |
|---|---|---|---|---|
| Liberal | Onesime Guibord | 2,536 | 59.46 | +1.29 |
| Conservative | O. Rochon | 1,729 | 40.54 | -1.29 |
| Total valid votes | | 4,265 | | |
| Liberal hold | | Swing | | +1.29 |

1898 Ontario general election
| Party | Candidate | Votes | % | ±% |
|---|---|---|---|---|
| Liberal | Onesime Guibord | 2,738 | 58.26 | -4.22 |
| Conservative | Marier | 1,962 | 41.74 | +4.22 |
| Total valid votes | | 4,700 | | |
| Liberal hold | | Swing | | -4.22 |

1894 Ontario general election
| Party | Candidate | Votes | % | ±% |
|---|---|---|---|---|
| Liberal | Alexander Robillard | 1,976 | 62.47 | +0.91 |
| Conservative | J. Tytler | 1,187 | 37.53 | -0.91 |
| Total valid votes | | 3,163 | | |
| Liberal hold | | Swing | | +0.91 |

1890 Ontario general election
| Party | Candidate | Votes | % | ±% |
|---|---|---|---|---|
| Liberal | Alexander Robillard | 2,223 | 61.56 | +10.15 |
| Conservative | Andrew Broder | 1,388 | 38.44 | -8.99 |
| Total valid votes | | 3,611 | | |
| Liberal hold | | Swing | | +9.57 |

1886 Ontario general election
| Party | Candidate | Votes | % | ±% |
|---|---|---|---|---|
| Liberal | Alexander Robillard | 1,908 | 51.41 | +16.77 |
| Conservative | R. Cummings | 1,760 | 47.43 | +0.95 |
| Independent | N. McCaul | 43 | 1.16 | +0.57 |
| Total valid votes | | 3,711 | | |
| Liberal gain from Conservative | | Swing | | +7.91 |

1883 Ontario general election
| Party | Candidate | Votes | % | ±% |
|---|---|---|---|---|
| Conservative | Honoré Robillard | 1,265 | 46.47 | +2.38 |
| Liberal | Alexander Robillard | 943 | 34.64 | -7.74 |
| Independent | C. Billings | 494 | 18.16 | |
| Liberal | N. McCaul | 16 | 0.59 | |
| Independent | Sproule | 4 | 0.15 | |
| Total valid votes | | 2,722 | | |
| Conservative hold | | Swing | | +5.06 |

1879 Ontario general election
| Party | Candidate | Votes | % | ±% |
|---|---|---|---|---|
| Conservative | Adam J. Baker | 724 | 37.69 | −26.68 |
| Liberal | Ira Morgan | 696 | 36.23 | |
| Liberal | N. McCaul | 279 | 14.52 | |
| Independent | J. Tytler | 222 | 11.56 | |
| Total valid votes | | 1,921 | 40.00 | −9.09 |
| Eligible voters | | 4,802 | | |
| Conservative hold | | Swing | | −26.68 |
Source: Elections Ontario

Ontario provincial by-election, August 1875 Previous election voided
| Party | Candidate | Votes | % | ±% |
|---|---|---|---|---|
| Conservative | Adam J. Baker | 1,335 | 64.37 | +13.07 |
| Independent | A. Rocque | 734 | 35.39 | |
| Independent | Mr. Wilson | 5 | 0.24 | |
| Total valid votes | | 2,074 | | |
| Conservative hold | | Swing | | +13.07 |
Source: History of the Electoral Districts, Legislatures and Ministries of the Province of Ontario

1875 Ontario general election
| Party | Candidate | Votes | % | ±% |
|---|---|---|---|---|
| Conservative | Adam J. Baker | 1,066 | 61.30 | +10.01 |
| Liberal | Ira Morgan | 673 | 38.70 | −9.54 |
| Total valid votes | | 1,739 | 49.10 | −7.05 |
| Eligible voters | | 3,542 | | |
Election voided
Source: Elections Ontario

1871 Ontario general election
| Party | Candidate | Votes | % | ±% |
|---|---|---|---|---|
| Conservative | William Craig | 773 | 51.29 | −14.04 |
| Liberal | Ira Morgan | 727 | 48.24 | +24.43 |
| Independent | Mr. Hely | 7 | 0.46 | |
| Turnout | | 1,507 | 56.15 | −12.80 |
| Eligible voters | | 2,684 | | |
| Conservative hold | | Swing | | −19.24 |
Source: Elections Ontario

1867 Ontario general election
| Party | Candidate | Votes | % |
|---|---|---|---|
| Conservative | William Craig | 1,287 | 65.33 |
| Liberal | J.L. O'Hanley | 469 | 23.81 |
| Independent | R. Sparks | 214 | 10.86 |
| Total valid votes | | 1,970 | 68.95 |
| Eligible voters | | 2,857 | |
| Conservative pickup new district. | | | |
Source: Elections Ontario
