= 2015 Ottawa Larmond twins terror conspiracy =

Canadian terrorism case

- Courtroom sketch of Ashton Larmond and Carlos Larmond being arraigned on special terrorism-related charges
- Location: Ottawa, Ontario, Canada and Montreal, Quebec, Canada
- Date: August 2014-January 2015 arrests by Royal Canadian Mounted Police after collaborative INSETs national-security criminal investigation
- Target: terrorist activities conspiracy
- Attack type: Conspiracy
- Injuries: None
- Perpetrators: 2 suspects

The 2015 Ottawa Larmond twins terror conspiracy allegations arise from a national-security terrorism-related criminal investigation by the Royal Canadian Mounted Police and Integrated National Security Enforcement Teams, including the Ottawa Police Service and the Ontario Provincial Police. Specifically, the charges detail an alleged conspiracy by twin brothers, Ashton Larmond and Carlos Larmond, both of Vanier, Ontario, to commit terrorist acts.

== Background ==
The brothers apparently lived in a two-storey home on Ste.-Cecile Street in Vanier, an Ottawa suburb. They both were known to have attended Rideau High School, which is on St. Laurent Boulevard, Ottawa. The brothers, described as "inseparable" and who "acted as though they ruled the neighbourhood"—were known to be recent converts to Islam, but were asserted to be not part of any Muslim congregation in the Ottawa area—although as Abdulhakim Moalimishak, president of the Assalaam Mosque on St. Laurent Boulevard in Ottawa, noted, Ashton Larmond did attend that Mosque occasionally, and specifically, during Ramadan in 2013.

== Accusations ==
On 10 January 2015, Ashton Carleton Larmond and Carlos Honor Larmond, both 24 years old, were arraigned in an Ottawa court on various special terrorism-related charges pursuant to the Criminal Code.

Ashton Larmond is charged with

- Facilitating terrorist activity, contrary to section 83.19 of the Criminal Code;
- Participation in the activity of a terrorist group, contrary to section 83.18 of the Criminal Code; and
- Instructing to carry out activity for a terrorist group, contrary to section 83.21(1) of the Criminal Code.

Carlos Larmond is charged with

- Participation in the activity of a terrorist group, contrary to section 83.18 of the Criminal Code; and,
- Attempting to leave Canada to participate in terrorist activity abroad, contrary to section 83.181 of the Criminal Code.

== Legal proceedings ==
=== Arrests ===
Carlos Larmond was arrested at the Montreal Pierre Elliott Trudeau International Airport as he was allegedly intending to travel overseas for terrorist purposes. Ashton Carleton Larmond was arrested in Ottawa.

Assistant Commissioner James Malizia, Officer in charge of the RCMP's Federal Policing Operations, assured Canadians: "Today's arrests speak to our ability to tackle a threat that is multifaceted and constantly evolving. Through collaborative efforts with our partners, we were able to prevent these individuals from leaving Canada to engage in terrorist activity overseas."

=== Incarceration ===
On 3 March 2015, Carlos Larmond was beaten by fellow prisoner Terrence Wilson, 24, when Larmond attempted to convert Wilson then threatened him when Wilson resisted. In the scuffle, Larmond suffered a broken left hand & a black eye.

=== Conviction ===
On 26 August 2016, Ashton Larmond was sentenced to a term of penitentiary totalling 17 years, less 894 days, which represents the 595 days spent in custody since his time of arrest, giving him credit at the rate of 1.5 days for 1, on the terrorism count. He was also convicted of threats of death to correctional officers at the Ottawa-Carleton Detention Centre, unlawfully communicating with his brother after promising the court not to do so, and threatening death to fellow inmates in the OCDC and given a sentence on each of those counts of 12 months concurrent to each other and concurrent to the 17-year sentence. Parole shall not be available until one half of his sentence has been served.

Carlos Larmond was sentenced to a term in the penitentiary of 7 years, less 894 days which represents the 595 days spent in custody since his time of arrest, giving him credit at the rate of 1.5 days for 1 on the terrorism count. On the OCDC-related counts, he was sentenced to six months in prison, to be served consecutive to the seven-year sentence. Parole shall not be available until one half of his prison term has been served.

Suliman Mohamed, a friend of Larmonds who was arrested separately from them at a later date and planned to go to Syria as well but was stopped from doing so by passport troubles, was sentenced to a term of imprisonment in the penitentiary for 7 years, less 889 days, representing credit for 593 days of pre-trial custody at the rate of 1.5 for 1. Parole shall not be available until one half of his prison term has been served.
