= Alexander Collins =

Alexander or Alex Collins may refer to:

- Alex Collins (politician) (1876–1949), mayor
- Alex Collins (American football) (1994–2023), American football player
- Alexander L. Collins (1812–1901), Wisconsin Whig politician and judge
- Alexander Collins, fictional character in the comic Tribe

== See also ==
- Sandy Collins (disambiguation)
