= Moss Kent Dickinson =

Canadian politician

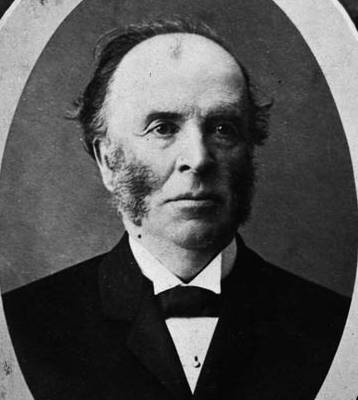

Member of the Canadian Parliament for Russell
- In office 1882–1887
- Preceded by: John O'Connor
- Succeeded by: William Cameron Edwards

5th Mayor of Ottawa
- In office 1864–1866
- Preceded by: Henry J. Friel
- Succeeded by: Robert Lyon

Personal details
- Born: June 1, 1822 Denmark Township, Lewis County, New York
- Died: July 19, 1897 (aged 75) Manotick, Ontario
- Party: Conservative
- Children: George Lemuel Dickinson

Moss Kent Dickinson (June 1, 1822 – July 19, 1897) was a Canadian businessman, mayor of Ottawa from 1864 to 1866, Member of Parliament from 1882 to 1887 and the founder of Manotick.

== Background ==
He was born in Denmark, New York in 1822 to parents Barnabus and Lydia Dickinson. A descendant of the Mayflower Pilgrims, the Dickinson family had been settled in the United States for generations. His family moved to Cornwall, Ontario in 1827. By 1847, he had established a business transporting goods on the Rideau Canal between Ottawa and Kingston. By 1850, Moss owned 16 steamers and 60 barges. Locals started to call him the 'King of the Rideau'.

Dickinson saw promise on Long Island in the middle of the Rideau River. He purchased seven acres of land in the town he named Manotick. Dickinson chose the name 'Manotick' from the Algonquin word for 'island'.

== Career ==
In 1860, with Joseph Merrill Currier, he completed construction of the Long Island Flouring Mill in Manotick, Ontario. He also built a sawmill, carding mill and bung factory. This served as the economic basis for the formation of the village. The grist mill is today called Watson's Mill and is open to the public as a museum.

Moss Kent Dickinson applied to five Order-in-Councils during his life. His son, George Dickinson, applied to two. The Orders-in-Councils were either about a lease of water power or for timber limits. The timber grants were in the North-West Territories. The timber grants provided additional income for the Dickinsons. John A. Macdonald signed Moss Kent Dickinson's and George's Orders-in-Council. It was more of a standard procedure of the Prime Minister than an indicator of a specific benevolence extended towards the family. Wilfrid Laurier had signed George's last Order-in-Council dated March 31, 1903. George had applied for a grant of water bulkheads to Long Island.

== Politics ==
Dickinson served as mayor of Ottawa from 1864 to 1866. Under his leadership, the Ottawa City Passenger Railway was incorporated. It was the first public transit system in Ottawa. The system consisted of horse-drawn tramcars that rode on iron rails.

Dickinson was also elected in the riding of Russell in the 1882 federal election. (Dickinson was the last non-Liberal MP for Russell County until Pierre Lemieux was elected in 2006, a span of 124 years.) His son George Lemuel also served in the House of Commons.

== Connection to Sir John A. Macdonald ==
Macdonald visited Manotick once, on February 10, 1887. He gave a speech at the large hall over Dickinson's lumber mill. Macdonald mentioned that he was "happy to meet his constituents in Manotick." He had dinner at the Dickinson's residence afterwards. Their conversations were brief, as Macdonald left that night to return to Ottawa.

Patronage was a key theme in Dickinson's relationship with Macdonald. This was prominent in their correspondence. It spanned through many years, with the first letter in 1863 and the last in the year of Macdonald's death, 1891. The 28 years of correspondence yielded only 38 letters. Dickinson wrote 31 of them and Macdonald wrote 7. Most of the letters were about appointments or political favours for him or his friends.

== Family ==
Together with his wife Elizabeth, Dickinson had five children: George, Charlotte, William, Lydia and Elizabeth. He also had another son, Alpheus, who died in infancy. Lydia died at age 15 of tuberculosis. None of Dickinson's children ever married, leaving him with no descendants.

== Legacy ==
He died in Manotick in 1897. Dickinson is buried in Beechwood Cemetery beside his wife. Dickinson Days are celebrated in Manotick on the first weekend in June, to coincide with Dickinson's birthday.

== Electoral record ==
1882 Canadian federal election: Russell
Party	Candidate	Votes
Conservative	Moss Kent Dickinson	1,644
Liberal	William Cameron Edwards	1,335

1891 Canadian federal election: Russell
Party	Candidate	Votes
Liberal	William Cameron Edwards	2,308
Conservative	Moss Kent Dickinson	1,895
Source: lop.parl.ca
