= Charles Avila Séguin =

Canadian politician

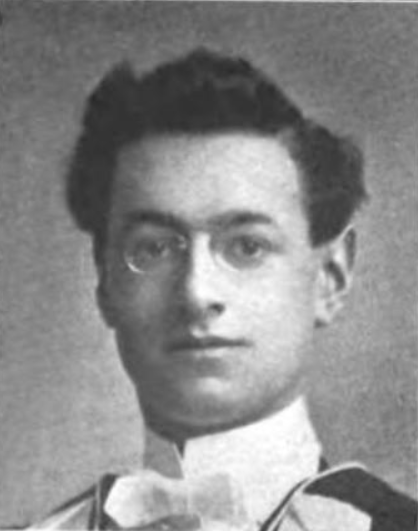

Ontario MPP
- In office 1929–1934
- Preceded by: Aurélien Bélanger
- Succeeded by: Arthur Desrosiers
- Constituency: Russell

Personal details
- Born: August 7, 1883 Montreal, Quebec, Canada
- Died: December 9, 1965 (aged 82) Ottawa, Ontario, Canada
- Party: Conservative
- Spouse: Germaine Nantel
- Profession: Lawyer

Charles Avila Séguin (August 7, 1883 – December 9, 1965) was an Ontario lawyer and political figure. He represented Russell in the Legislative Assembly of Ontario as a Conservative member from 1929 to 1934.

== Background ==
Charles Avila Séguin was born in Montreal, Quebec, on August 7, 1883, and studied at the University of Ottawa and Osgoode Hall Law School. In 1912, he married Germaine, the daughter of Wilfrid Bruno Nantel, who was a federal cabinet minister.

== Politics ==
He ran unsuccessfully against Aurélien Bélanger in 1926 before being elected in 1929, defeating Bélanger. In 1928, he was named King's Counsel. In 1940, Séguin ran unsuccessfully for a seat in the House of Commons in Ottawa East.

He died in Ottawa, December 9, 1965.
