= Alexander Robillard =

Canadian politician

Ontario MPP
- In office 1886–1898
- Preceded by: Honoré Robillard
- Succeeded by: Onésime Guibord
- Constituency: Russell

Personal details
- Born: 1843 Glouchester Township, Canada West
- Died: 1907 (aged 63–64)
- Party: Liberal
- Spouse(s): Sophie Lafleur; Clara Caron
- Relations: Honoré Robillard, brother
- Occupation: Quarryman

Alexandre (Alexander) Robillard (1843–1907) was a Canadian politician. He was a Liberal Member of the Legislative Assembly of Ontario for Russell from 1886 to 1898.

He was born in Glouchester Township, Canada West, in the year 1843 and studied in Ottawa. Robillard was involved in the operation of quarries providing material for construction in Gloucester Township. In 1883, he ran unsuccessfully for Russell against his brother, Honoré. Both he and his brother served as reeve for the township.

Alexandre married Sophie Lafleur. After her death, he later married Clara Caron.
