= Gordon Lavergne =

Canadian politician from Ontario

Ontario MPP
- In office 1954–1963
- Preceded by: Joseph Daniel Nault
- Succeeded by: Bert Lawrence
- Constituency: Russell

Personal details
- Born: April 6, 1910 or 1911; Eastview, Ontario
- Died: March 21, 1970 (aged 58); Vanier, Ontario
- Political party: Progressive Conservative
- Spouse: Yvonne Goulet
- Children: 4
- Profession: Merchant

Gordon Lavergne (April 6, 1911 – March 21, 1970) was an Ontario political figure. He represented Russell in the Legislative Assembly of Ontario as a Progressive Conservative from 1954 to 1963.

== Background ==
He was born in Eastview, the son of Henry Lavergne. In 1935, he married Yvonne Goulet and they had four children. Lavergne was a merchant.

== Politics ==
He served as mayor of Eastview (the name of Vanier, Ontario prior to 1969) from 1948 to 1960.

He was elected to the Ontario assembly in a 1954 by-election held after the death of Joseph Daniel Nault. He was defeated for the PC nomination for the 1963 general election by Bert Lawrence, and Lavergne retired from politics after failing to get elected as an Independent Progressive Conservative. He died of an apparent heart attack in 1970.
