= Alex Collins (politician) =

Canadian politician

G.H. Alex Collins (George Hamilton Alexander Collins, August 28, 1876 – May 1949) was a photographer, soldier, and politician in Ontario, Canada. He was mayor of Eastview in 1921 and from 1928 to 1930.

Collins was born in Ottawa, the son of Peter Collins and Sarah Henry, and was educated there. He entered the Canadian Army in the 19th century, becoming sergeant-major in 1913. He was a member of the Royal Canadian Dragoons and the 4th Canadian Mounted Rifles and served in the Second Boer War and World War I. Collins married Jennie Gordon. He was elected to the first municipal council for Eastview in 1913. Collins ran for mayor in 1915 and lost. He was acting mayor in 1921 following the death of Camille Gladu and lost when he ran for that post in the election held the following year. He was first elected mayor in December 1927. Collins was reelected in 1928 and 1929, then was defeated by David Langelier when he ran for reelection in December 1930. Collins died on May 14 or 15 in 1949.
