= Robert Blackburn (politician) =

Canadian politician

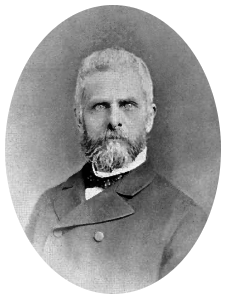

Member of the Canadian Parliament for Russell
- In office 1874–1878
- Preceded by: James Alexander Grant
- Succeeded by: John O'Connor

Personal details
- Born: 17 December 1828 Glasgow, Scotland
- Died: 12 August 1894 (aged 65) Liverpool, England
- Party: Liberal

Robert Blackburn (17 December 1828 – 12 August 1894) was a Scottish-Canadian businessman and politician. Blackburn served as a village reeve and Member of Parliament.

Blackburn was born in Glasgow, Scotland in 1828, the son of Robert Blackburn, and came to Canada in 1842. He became a lumber merchant and partner in woollen mills. He was reeve of Gloucester Township, Ontario in 1864. He was also reeve of New Edinburgh, Ontario from 1868 to 1870 and from 1871 to 1873. In 1864, Blackburn married Mary Ann French. He was Liberal Member of Parliament for Russell from 1874 to 1878. Blackburn also served as a director of the Bank of Ottawa and the Ottawa Agricultural Insurance Company. Along with William Goodhue Perley and others, he helped establish the Ottawa City Passenger Railway Company, a horse-drawn tram service, in 1866. He died in Liverpool, England at the age of 64.

Blackburn Hamlet, Ontario was named after him.

His uncle, James Blackburn, represented the County of Ottawa in the Legislative Assembly of Lower Canada.

1874 Canadian federal election: Russell
Party	Candidate	Votes
Liberal	Robert Blackburn	1,078
Conservative	James Grant	1,014
Unknown	W. R. Bell	95
Source: Canadian Elections Database
