= Canada Cement Company =

Canadian cement company (1909–1985)

- Founded: 10 September 1909
- Defunct: 1 January 1988
- Fate: Merged into Lafarge
- Successor: Lafarge Canada Inc.
- Headquarters: Canada Cement Building, Montreal, Quebec

The Canada Cement Company, Limited, and from 1970 onwards Canada Cement Lafarge Ltd., was a Canadian Portland cement company that existed from 1909 to 1988. The company was created by the Lord Beaverbrook through the merger of ten existing cement companies. Canada Cement was, along with Stelco and Canadian Car and Foundry, one of three major corporate combinations formed by Beaverbrook. In 1970, Canada Cement was acquired by Lafarge and renamed Canada Cement Lafarge Ltd. The company remained in existence until 1988, when it was renamed Lafarge Canada Inc.

== History ==
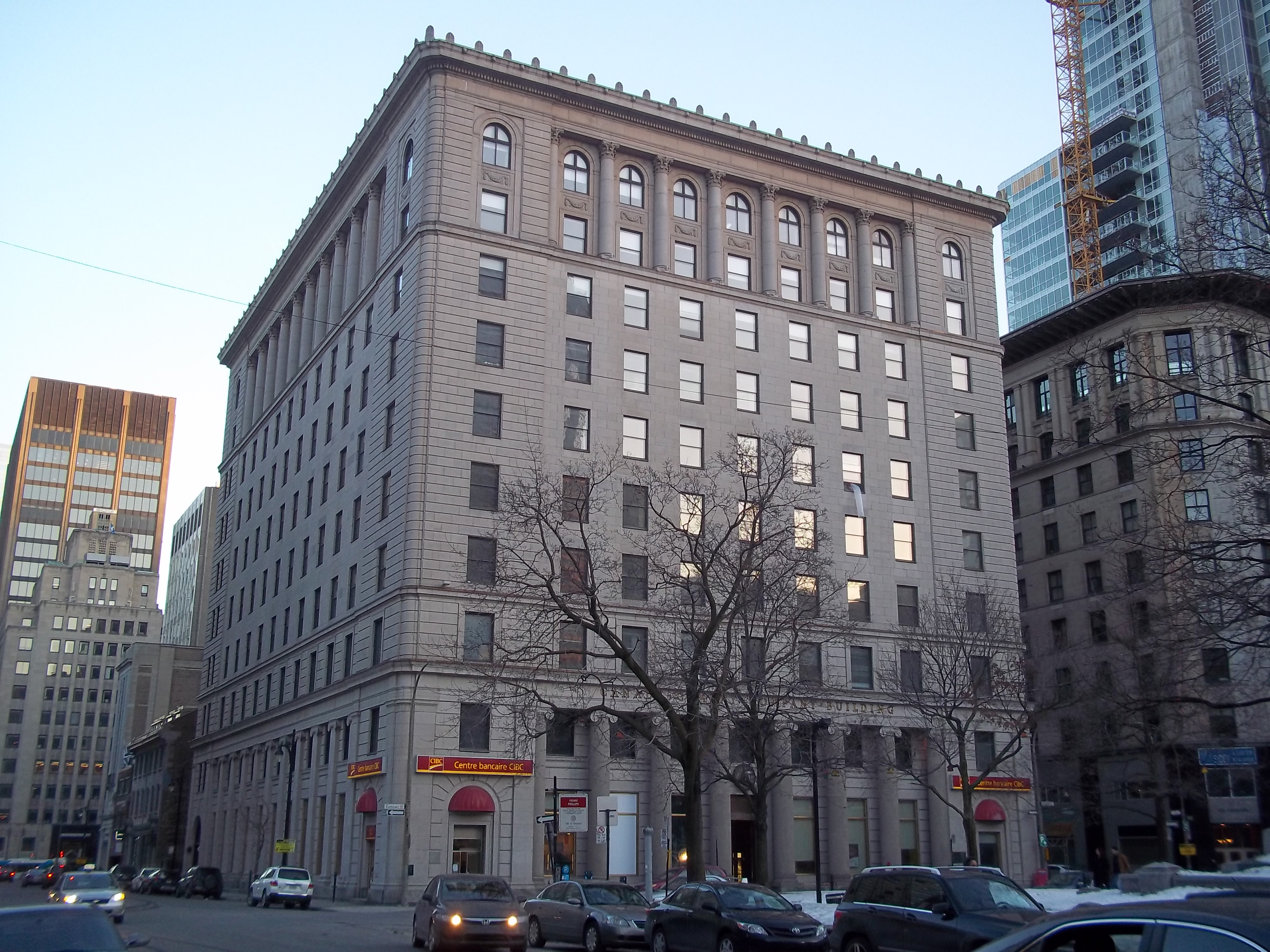
The 1921 Canada Cement Building on Phillips Square in Montreal, designed by Barott & Blackader.

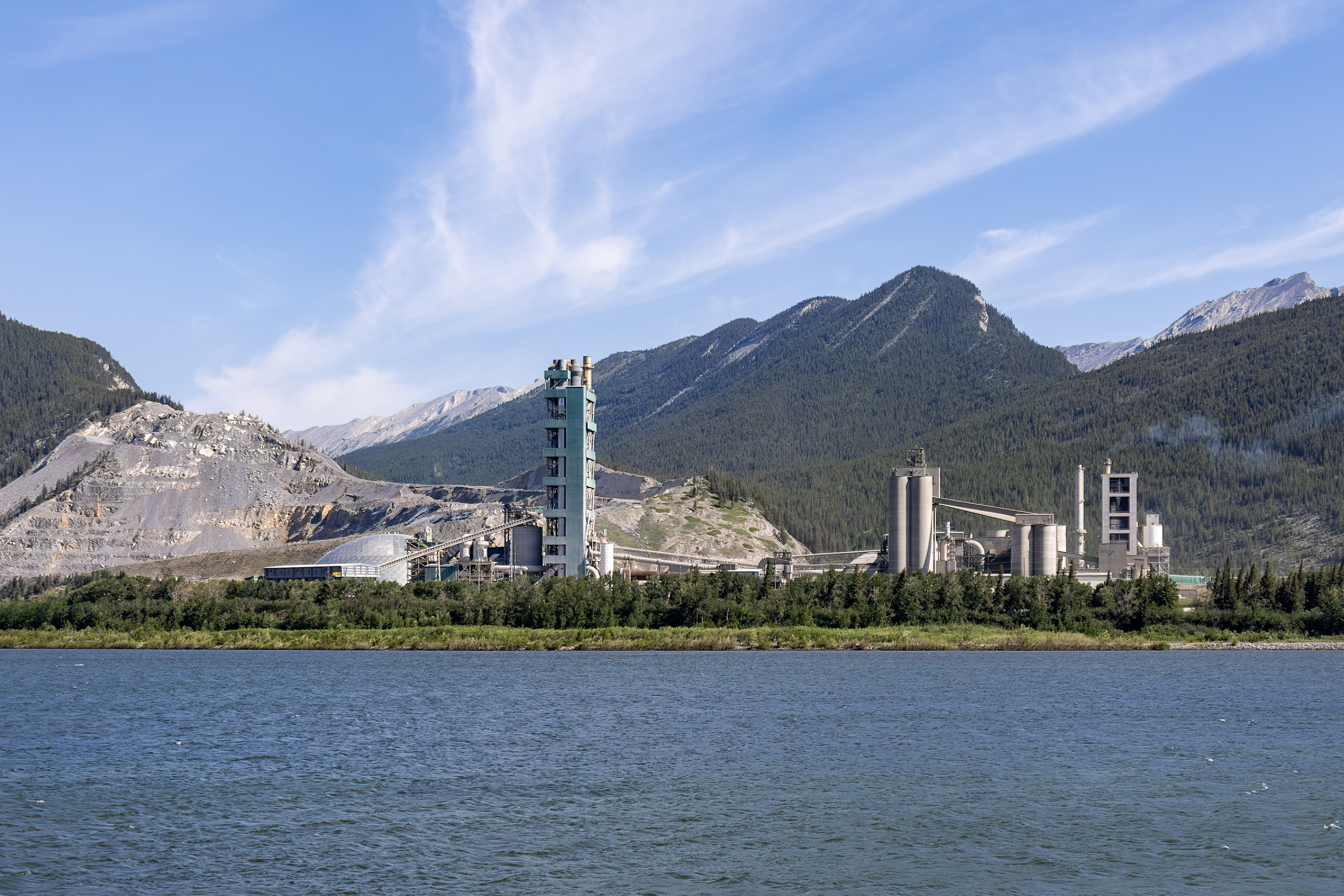
The cement plant at Exshaw, built by Sir Sanford Fleming in 1906. It was acquired by Canada Cement in 1911.

In 1909, Beaverbrook merged ten Portland cement companies together into the new Canada Cement Company. The merged companies were the International Portland Cement Company (Hull, Quebec), Vulcan Portland Cement Company (Montreal, Quebec), Lehigh Portland Cement Company (Belleville, Ontario), Canadian Portland Cement Company (Marlbank, Ontario), Canadian Portland Cement Company (Port Colborne, Ontario), Lakefield Portland Cement Company (Montreal, Quebec), Lakefield Portland Cement Company (Lakefield, Ontario), Owen Sound Portland Cement Company (Shallow Lake, Ontario), Alberta Portland Cement Company (Calgary, Alberta), and Belleville Portland Cement Company (Belleville, Ontario).

In February 1911, Canada Cement purchased the Exshaw cement plant during the liquidation of the Western Canada Cement and Coal Company. The plant had been built in 1906 by Sir Sanford Fleming.

In 1970, Canada Cement acquired all shares of Lafarge Canada Limited of Vancouver. At the time, Canada Cement was 21 per cent owned by Lafarge while Lafarge Canada was 60 per cent owned by its French parent. Under the terms of the merger, the company's authorised shares were increased from 3 million to 4 million, and five Lafarge Canada shares were exchanged for two shares of Canada Cement. After the merger, Lafarge held a 30 per cent share in Canada Cement. On 1 May 1970, the company changed its name to Canada Cement Lafarge Ltd.

== Leadership ==
=== President ===
1. Charles Hazlitt Cahan, 18 October 1909 – 29 March 1910
2. William Cameron Edwards, 29 March 1910 – 17 September 1921 †
3. Frank Percy Jones, 3 October 1921 – 21 October 1927
4. Arthur Charles Tagge, 21 October 1927 – 9 January 1931
5. John David Johnson, 9 January 1931 – 23 February 1948
6. Frederick Binns Kilbourn, 23 February 1948 – 20 May 1949 †
7. Joseph Melville Breen, 20 June 1949 – 5 February 1962
8. Vesey Courthope Hamilton, 5 February 1962 – 10 January 1968
9. James Taylor Kennedy, 10 January 1968 – 9 May 1977
10. John Douglas Redfern, 9 May 1977 – 1 September 1983
11. Robert Waugh Murdoch, 1 September 1983 – 31 December 1987

=== Chairman of the Board ===
1. John David Johnson, 23 February 1948 – 5 February 1962
2. Joseph Melville Breen, 5 February 1962 – 10 January 1968
3. Vesey Courthope Hamilton, 10 January 1968 – 3 July 1968
4. Peter Michael McEntyre, 3 July 1968 – 4 May 1984
5. John Douglas Redfern, 4 May 1984 – 31 December 1987
