= Sandy Collins =

Sandy Collins may refer to:

- Sandy Collins (politician) (born 1978), member of the Newfoundland and Labrador House of Assembly
- Sandy Collins (tennis) (born 1958), American tennis player

== See also ==
- Alexander Collins (disambiguation)
