= Adam J. Baker =

Canadian politician

Ontario MPP
- In office 1875–1883
- Preceded by: William Craig
- Succeeded by: Honoré Robillard
- Constituency: Russell

Personal details
- Born: September 22, 1821 Osnabruck Township, County of Stormont, Upper Canada
- Died: August 3, 1912 (aged 90) Killarney, Manitoba
- Party: Conservative
- Spouse: Janet McDonnell (m. 1849)

Adam Jacob Baker (September 22, 1821 – August 3, 1912) was a member of the Legislative Assembly of Ontario representing Russell from 1875 to 1883 and Reeve of Osgoode Township from 1877 to 1878.

He was born in Osnabruck Township in the County of Stormont in Upper Canada, to William and Anne Eve (née Waldorff) in 1821. He manufactured barrels in the village of Metcalfe where he was also postmaster for 20 years. He married Janet McDonnell in 1849.

He died August 3, 1912, in Killarney, Manitoba.

== Electoral history ==
1875 Ontario general election: Russell
Party	Candidate	Votes	%	±%
Conservative	Adam J. Baker	1,066	61.30	+10.01
Liberal	Ira Morgan	673	38.70	−9.54
Total valid votes		1,739	49.10	−7.05
Eligible voters		3,542		
Election voided
Source: Elections Ontario

Ontario provincial by-election, August 1875: Russell Previous election voided
Party	Candidate	Votes	%	±%
Conservative	Adam J. Baker	1,335	64.37	+13.07
Independent	A. Rocque	734	35.39	
Independent	Mr. Wilson	5	0.24	
Total valid votes		2,074		
Conservative hold		Swing		+13.07
Source: History of the Electoral Districts, Legislatures and Ministries of the Province of Ontario

1879 Ontario general election: Russell
Party	Candidate	Votes	%	±%
Conservative	Adam J. Baker	724	37.69	−26.68
Liberal	Ira Morgan	696	36.23	
Liberal	N. McCaul	279	14.52	
Independent	J. Tytler	222	11.56	
Total valid votes		1,921	40.00	−9.09
Eligible voters		4,802		
Conservative hold		Swing		−26.68
Source: Elections Ontario
