= Russell (Ontario federal electoral district) =

Former federal electoral district in Ontario, Canada

Ontario electoral district
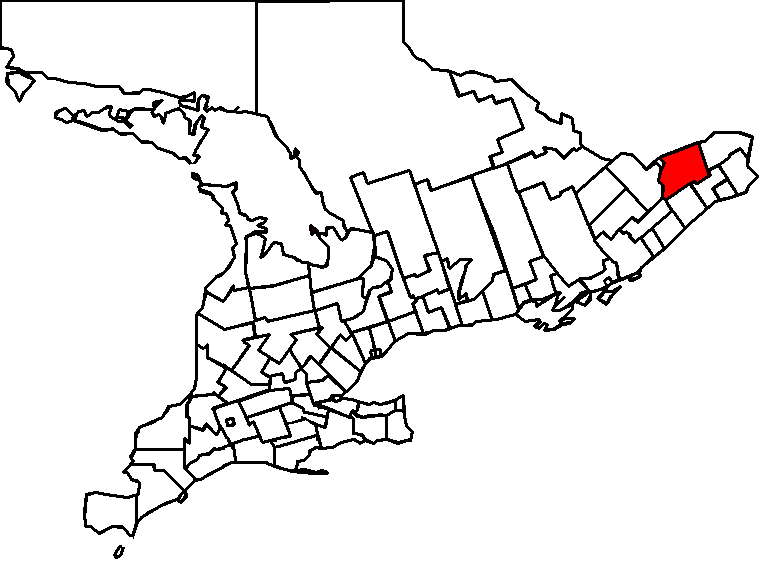
- Location of Russell in Ontario in 1867

Defunct federal electoral district
- Legislature: House of Commons
- District created: 1867
- District abolished: 1966
- First contested: 1867
- Last contested: 1965

Russell was a federal electoral district in eastern Ontario, Canada, that was represented in the House of Commons of Canada from 1867 to 1968.

The federal riding was created by the British North America Act 1867, and consisted initially of the County of Russell the townships of Gloucester and Osgoode in the county of Carleton. In 1903, the Rideau Ward of the city of Ottawa was added to the riding. In 1933, it was redefined to consist of the county of Russell and the part of the county of Carleton included in the township of Gloucester, excepting that part of the township of Gloucester included in the town of Eastview and the village of Rockcliffe Park. In 1947, it was expanded to include the town of Eastview in the township of Gloucester in the county of Carleton.

The federal electoral district was abolished in 1966 when it was redistributed between Glengarry—Prescott, Ottawa East and Ottawa—Carleton ridings.

== Pre-confederation ==
District created in 1834 from Prescott & Russell.

Members of the Parliament of Upper Canada

1. Thomas McKay (1834–1840)

Members of the Parliament of the Province of Canada

1. William Henry Draper, Conservative (1841–1843)
2. William Stewart, Conservative (1843–1844)
3. Archibald Petrie, Conservative (1844–1847)
4. G. B. Lyon-Fellowes, Conservative (1847–1857)
5. John W. Loux (1857–1861)
6. Robert Bell, Conservative (1861–1866)

== Members of Parliament ==
This riding elected the following members of the House of Commons of Canada:

| Parliament | Years | Member | Party |
|---|---|---|---|
| 1st | 1867–1872 | James Grant | Conservative |
| 2nd | 1872–1874 | James Grant | Conservative |
| 3rd | 1874–1878 | Robert Blackburn | Liberal |
| 4th | 1878–1878 | John O'Connor | Conservative |
| 4th | 1878–1882 | John O'Connor | Conservative |
| 5th | 1882–1887 | Moss Kent Dickinson | Conservative |
| 6th | 1887–1888 | William Cameron Edwards | Liberal |
| 6th | 1888–1891 | William Cameron Edwards | Liberal |
| 7th | 1891–1896 | William Cameron Edwards | Liberal |
| 8th | 1896–1900 | William Cameron Edwards | Liberal |
| 9th | 1900–1903 | William Cameron Edwards | Liberal |
| 9th | 1903–1904 | David Wardrope Wallace | Liberal |
| 10th | 1904–1908 | Norman Frank Wilson | Liberal |
| 11th | 1908–1911 | Charles Murphy | Liberal |
| 12th | 1911–1917 | Charles Murphy | Liberal |
| 13th | 1917–1921 | Charles Murphy | Opposition (Laurier Liberals) |
| 14th | 1921–1921 | Charles Murphy | Liberal |
| 14th | 1921–1925 | Charles Murphy | Liberal |
| 15th | 1925–1926 | Alfred Goulet | Liberal |
| 16th | 1926–1930 | Alfred Goulet | Liberal |
| 17th | 1930–1935 | Alfred Goulet | Liberal |
| 18th | 1935–1940 | Alfred Goulet | Liberal |
| 19th | 1940–1945 | Alfred Goulet | Liberal |
| 20th | 1945–1949 | Joseph-Omer Gour | Liberal |
| 21st | 1949–1953 | Joseph-Omer Gour | Liberal |
| 22nd | 1953–1957 | Joseph-Omer Gour | Liberal |
| 23rd | 1957–1958 | Joseph-Omer Gour | Liberal |
| 24th | 1958–1959† | Joseph-Omer Gour | Liberal |
| 24th | 1959–1962 | Paul Tardif | Liberal |
| 25th | 1962–1963 | Paul Tardif | Liberal |
| 26th | 1963–1965 | Paul Tardif | Liberal |
| 27th | 1965–1968 | Paul Tardif | Liberal |
Riding dissolved into Glengarry—Prescott, Ottawa East and Ottawa—Carleton

== Election results ==
1867 Canadian federal election
| Party | Candidate | Votes |
|---|---|---|
| Conservative | James Grant | 1,293 |
| Unknown | Robert Bell | 695 |

Result by municipality

| Municipality | Grant | Bell | Total vote | Eligible voters |
|---|---|---|---|---|
| Cambridge Township | 70 | 13 | 83 | 97 |
| Cumberland Township | 185 | 74 | 259 | 294 |
| Russell Township | 141 | 106 | 247 | 301 |
| Clarence Township | 121 | 63 | 184 | 235 |
| New Edinburgh | 33 | 11 | 44 | 57 |
| Gloucester Township | 385 | 154 | 539 | 745 |
| Osgoode Township | 358 | 274 | 632 | 727 |
| Total | 1,293 | 695 | 1,988 | 2,456 |

1872 Canadian federal election
| Party | Candidate | Votes |
|---|---|---|
| Conservative | James Grant | 1,217 |
| Liberal | Malcolm Cameron | 952 |
Source: Canadian Elections Database

1874 Canadian federal election
| Party | Candidate | Votes |
|---|---|---|
| Liberal | Robert Blackburn | 1,078 |
| Conservative | James Grant | 1,014 |
| Unknown | W. R. Bell | 95 |
Source: Canadian Elections Database

1878 Canadian federal election
| Party | Candidate | Votes |
|---|---|---|
| Conservative | John O'Connor | 1,612 |
| Unknown | Ira Morgan | 1,097 |
Source: Canadian Elections Database

By-election: On Mr. O'Connor being appointed President of the Privy Council, 4 November 1878
| Party | Candidate | Votes |
|---|---|---|
| Conservative | John O'Connor | acclaimed |

1882 Canadian federal election
| Party | Candidate | Votes |
|---|---|---|
| Conservative | Moss Kent Dickinson | 1,644 |
| Liberal | William Cameron Edwards | 1,335 |

1887 Canadian federal election
| Party | Candidate | Votes |
|---|---|---|
| Liberal | William Cameron Edwards | 2,301 |
| Conservative | Charles Herbert Mackintosh | 2,146 |

By-election: On Mr. Edwards being unseated for bribery, 7 May 1888
| Party | Candidate | Votes |
|---|---|---|
| Liberal | William Cameron Edwards | 2,166 |
| Unknown | Charles Herbert Mackintosh | 1,963 |

1891 Canadian federal election
| Party | Candidate | Votes |
|---|---|---|
| Liberal | William Cameron Edwards | 2,308 |
| Conservative | Moss Kent Dickinson | 1,895 |
Source: lop.parl.ca

1896 Canadian federal election
| Party | Candidate | Votes |
|---|---|---|
| Liberal | William Cameron Edwards | 2,983 |
| Conservative | E. N. Hurtibise | 1,380 |
| Independent | G. J. Wilson | 1,093 |

1900 Canadian federal election
| Party | Candidate | Votes |
|---|---|---|
| Liberal | William Cameron Edwards | 3,089 |
| Conservative | George Halsey Perley | 2,523 |

By-election: On Mr. Edwards being called to the Senate, 20 April 1903
| Party | Candidate | Votes |
|---|---|---|
| Liberal | David Wardrope Wallace | acclaimed |

1904 Canadian federal election
| Party | Candidate | Votes |
|---|---|---|
| Liberal | Norman Frank Wilson | 3,305 |
| Conservative | John E. Askwith | 2,357 |
| Independent | Morris Shaver | 66 |

1908 Canadian federal election
| Party | Candidate | Votes |
|---|---|---|
| Liberal | Charles Murphy | 3,616 |
| Conservative | John A. Gamble | 2,470 |

1911 Canadian federal election
| Party | Candidate | Votes |
|---|---|---|
| Liberal | Charles Murphy | 3,812 |
| Conservative | Joseph Ulric Vincent | 2,836 |

1917 Canadian federal election
| Party | Candidate | Votes |
|---|---|---|
| Opposition (Laurier Liberals) | Charles Murphy | 5,895 |
| Government (Unionist) | Duncan Cameron Merkley | 3,768 |

1921 Canadian federal election
| Party | Candidate | Votes |
|---|---|---|
| Liberal | Charles Murphy | 9,069 |
| Progressive | Marshall Rathwell | 6,836 |

By-election: On Mr. Murphy being appointed Postmaster General, 19 January 1921
| Party | Candidate | Votes |
|---|---|---|
| Liberal | Charles Murphy | acclaimed |

1925 Canadian federal election
| Party | Candidate | Votes |
|---|---|---|
| Liberal | Alfred Goulet | 8,419 |
| Conservative | Duncan Cameron Merkley | 6,328 |

1926 Canadian federal election
| Party | Candidate | Votes |
|---|---|---|
| Liberal | Alfred Goulet | 9,062 |
| Conservative | Wilfrid Thivierge | 4,876 |

1930 Canadian federal election
| Party | Candidate | Votes |
|---|---|---|
| Liberal | Alfred Goulet | 9,551 |
| Conservative | Alexandre Marion | 7,964 |

1935 Canadian federal election
| Party | Candidate | Votes |
|---|---|---|
| Liberal | Alfred Goulet | 5,041 |
| Independent | John Rudolphus Booth | 2,897 |
| Reconstruction | Marshall Rathwell | 1,423 |
| Conservative | Mathias Landry | 1,368 |
| Independent | Joseph Alvary Brisson | 862 |

1940 Canadian federal election
| Party | Candidate | Votes |
|---|---|---|
| Liberal | Alfred Goulet | 6,045 |
| National Government | Frederic-A. Caillier | 2,961 |

1945 Canadian federal election
| Party | Candidate | Votes |
|---|---|---|
| Liberal | Joseph-Omer Gour | 5,519 |
| Progressive Conservative | Frederic-A. Caillier | 3,271 |
| Independent | Antonin Lalonde | 2,708 |
| Co-operative Commonwealth | Thomas Keenan | 600 |
| Social Credit | Harvey Turner | 340 |

1949 Canadian federal election
| Party | Candidate | Votes |
|---|---|---|
| Liberal | Joseph-Omer Gour | 12,635 |
| Progressive Conservative | Moïse Gendron | 5,767 |
| Co-operative Commonwealth | Ernest Cousineau | 1,112 |
| Social Credit | Adrien-Joseph Papineau | 538 |

1953 Canadian federal election
| Party | Candidate | Votes |
|---|---|---|
| Liberal | Joseph-Omer Gour | 15,969 |
| Progressive Conservative | Joseph E. Charron | 6,470 |
| Co-operative Commonwealth | Ernest Cousineau | 1,157 |
| Social Credit | Alexandre Denommée | 519 |

1957 Canadian federal election
| Party | Candidate | Votes |
|---|---|---|
| Liberal | Joseph-Omer Gour | 20,673 |
| Progressive Conservative | Wilbur Nixon | 12,271 |
| Co-operative Commonwealth | Harry Jacks | 1,420 |
| Social Credit | Eddie Parisien | 1,161 |

1958 Canadian federal election
| Party | Candidate | Votes |
|---|---|---|
| Liberal | Joseph-Omer Gour | 21,575 |
| Progressive Conservative | Wilbur Nixon | 19,464 |
| Co-operative Commonwealth | Harry Jacks | 1,224 |
| Social Credit | Eddie Parisien | 594 |

By-election: On Mr. Gour's death, 5 October 1959
| Party | Candidate | Votes |
|---|---|---|
| Liberal | Paul Tardif | 21,070 |
| Progressive Conservative | Wilbur Nixon | 14,152 |
| Co-operative Commonwealth | Denis Kalman | 1,077 |

1962 Canadian federal election
| Party | Candidate | Votes |
|---|---|---|
| Liberal | Paul Tardif | 29,322 |
| Progressive Conservative | Leo Kelly | 15,492 |
| New Democratic | Harold B. Wilson | 3,385 |
| Social Credit | Adrien Papineau | 1,427 |

1963 Canadian federal election
| Party | Candidate | Votes |
|---|---|---|
| Liberal | Paul Tardif | 31,182 |
| Progressive Conservative | Joe Poirier | 14,892 |
| New Democratic | Harold B. Wilson | 3,191 |
| Social Credit | Léo Cote | 2,938 |

1965 Canadian federal election
| Party | Candidate | Votes |
|---|---|---|
| Liberal | Paul Tardif | 28,997 |
| Progressive Conservative | Kenneth Binks | 15,718 |
| New Democratic | Harold B. Wilson | 7,186 |

== See also ==
- List of Canadian electoral districts
- Historical federal electoral districts of Canada
