= Langelier (surname) =

Langelier is a surname. Notable people with the surname include:

- Charles Langelier (1850–1920), Canadian lawyer, politician, judge, journalist, and writer
- David Langelier (1883–1922), Canadian politician
- François Langelier (1838–1915), Canadian lawyer, academic, journalist, politician, and writer
