= David Wardrope Wallace =

Canadian politician

David Wardrope Wallace (22 December 1850 – 19 November 1924) was an Ontario physician and political figure. He represented Russell in the House of Commons of Canada as a Liberal member from 1903 to 1904.

He was born in North Gower, Canada West in 1850, the son of James Wallace and Agnes Adams, and studied at Queen's University, receiving his M.D. there. Wallace married Esther Eastman in 1883. He was elected to the House of Commons in a 1903 by-election held after William C. Edwards was named to the Senate. Wallace died in Ottawa at the age of 73.

== Electoral record ==
By-election: On Mr. Edwards being called to the Senate, 20 April 1903
Party	Candidate	Votes
Liberal	David Wardrope Wallace	acclaimed

Parliament of Canada
Preceded by William Cameron Edwards	Member of Parliament for Russell; 1903–1904	Succeeded by Norman Frank Wilson
