= Onésime Guibord =

Canadian politician

Ontario MPP
- In office 1898–1904
- Preceded by: Alexander Robillard
- Succeeded by: Damase Racine
- Constituency: Russell

Personal details
- Born: April 22, 1858 Saint-Rémi, Canada East
- Died: December 11, 1937 (aged 79) Ottawa, Ontario
- Party: Liberal
- Spouse: Symodocée Payment (m. 1892)
- Occupation: Businessman

Onésime Guibord (April 22, 1858 – December 11, 1937) was an Ontario businessman and political figure. He represented Russell in the Legislative Assembly of Ontario from 1898 to 1904 as a Liberal member.

He was born in Saint-Rémi, Canada East in 1858, the son of Narcisse Guibord, and educated in Montreal. He worked as a school teacher before becoming a general merchant at Clarence Creek, Ontario in 1866. He was named license commissioner for Russell County in 1892. He married Symodocée Payment. Guibord was one of the founders of the newspaper Le Droit in 1912. He died at Ottawa in 1937.
