= Arthur Desrosiers =

Canadian politician

Ontario MPP
- In office 1934–1937
- Preceded by: Charles Avila Séguin
- Succeeded by: Romeo Bégin
- Constituency: Russell

Personal details
- Born: March 10, 1884 Clarence Creek, Ontario
- Died: July 7, 1951 (aged 67)
- Party: Liberal
- Children: 2
- Profession: Doctor

Arthur Desrosiers (March 10, 1884 – July 7, 1951) was a medical doctor and mayor of Eastview, Ontario, later known as Vanier. He also represented Russell in the Legislative Assembly of Ontario as a Liberal from 1934 to 1937.

== Background ==
He was born in Clarence Creek, Ontario in 1884, the son of Dr. Alexis Napoléon Desrosiers and Ernestine Dionne who was the daughter of Amable Dionne. He attended Collège Bourget in Rigaud, Quebec and then studied medicine at the Université Laval.

== Politics ==
He was mayor of Eastview in 1918–1919, 1922 and 1924 to 1927. During his time as mayor, he favoured annexation of Eastview by the nearby city of Ottawa. Desrosiers drowned in 1951 while boating in the Rideau River. He was survived by his two daughters, Pauline and Lucette.
