= Aurélien Bélanger =

Canadian politician

Ontario MPP
- In office 1934–1948
- Preceded by: Joseph St. Denis
- Succeeded by: Louis-Pierre Cécile
- Constituency: Prescott
- In office 1923–1929
- Preceded by: Alfred Goulet
- Succeeded by: Charles Avila Séguin
- Constituency: Russell

Personal details
- Born: March 18, 1878 Sainte-Scholastique, Quebec
- Died: February 12, 1953 (aged 74) Ottawa, Ontario
- Party: Liberal
- Spouse: Alida Rochon (m. 1902)

Aurélien Bélanger (March 18, 1878 – February 12, 1953) was an Ontario political figure. He represented Russell in the Legislative Assembly of Ontario as a Liberal and Independent Liberal from 1923 to 1929 and Prescott as a Liberal from 1934 to 1948.

He was born in Sainte-Scholastique, Quebec in 1878, the son of Zotique Belanger and Philomène Chénier, and studied languages, mathematics and philosophy at the Université d'Ottawa. Bélanger became a teacher], then a school inspector for Russell County, director of bilingual schools for the city of Ottawa and president of the Saint-Jean-Baptiste Society of Ottawa. He married Alida, the daughter of Télesphore Rochon and Célina Parisien. Bélanger was one of the founders of the newspaper Le Droit in 1912. He was defeated by Charles Avila Séguin for the Russell seat in 1929. He died at Ottawa in 1953.
