= Damase Racine =

Canadian politician

Ontario MPP
- In office 1905–1921
- Preceded by: Onésime Guibord
- Succeeded by: Alfred Goulet
- Constituency: Russell

Personal details
- Born: May 28, 1855 Crysle, Canada West
- Died: December 2, 1921 (aged 66) Ottawa, Ontario
- Party: Liberal
- Spouse: Cora Benoit (m. 1899)
- Occupation: Merchant

Damase Racine (May 28, 1855 – December 2, 1921) was an Ontario merchant and political figure. He represented Russell in the Legislative Assembly of Ontario as a Liberal member from 1905 to 1921.

He was born in Crysler, Ontario in 1855, the son of Jean-Baptiste Racine. He married Cora Benoit in 1899. He also served on the county council and as warden for Prescott and Russell Counties. Racine died in office in 1921.
