= Norman Frank Wilson =

Canadian politician

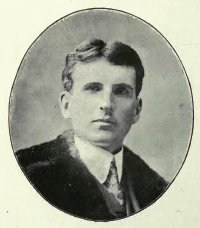

Member of the Canadian Parliament for Russell
- In office 1904–1908
- Preceded by: David Wardrope Wallace
- Succeeded by: Charles Murphy

Personal details
- Born: September 5, 1876 Cumberland, Ontario, Canada
- Died: July 14, 1956 (aged 79) Ottawa, Ontario, Canada
- Party: Liberal
- Spouse: Cairine Wilson

Norman Frank Wilson (September 5, 1876 – July 14, 1956) was an Ontario farmer and political figure.

== Early life; and political office ==
Wilson was born in Cumberland Township, Ontario (now Ottawa, Ontario) in 1876, the son of William Wilson and Mary McElroy. He studied at Upper Canada College and the Ontario Agricultural College at Guelph. Wilson operated a farm near Cumberland.

Wilson represented Russell in the House of Commons of Canada from 1904 to 1908 as a Liberal member.

== Personal ==
In 1909, Wilson married Cairine Reay Mackay, who later became the first woman to sit in the Canadian Senate.

He died in 1956 in Ottawa.

== Electoral record ==
1904 Canadian federal election: Russell
Party	Candidate	Votes
Liberal	Norman Frank Wilson	3,305
Conservative	John E. Askwith	2,357
Independent	Morris Shaver	66
