= John O'Connor (Canadian politician) =

Canadian politician (1824–1887)

The Honourable John O'Connor PC
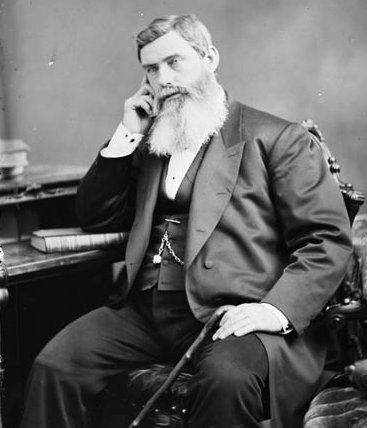

Member of the Canadian Parliament for Essex
- In office 1867–1874
- Succeeded by: William McGregor

Member of the Canadian Parliament for Russell
- In office 1878–1882
- Preceded by: Robert Blackburn
- Succeeded by: Moss Kent Dickinson

Personal details
- Born: January 1, 1824 Boston, Massachusetts
- Died: November 3, 1887 (aged 63) Cobourg, Ontario
- Party: Conservative
- Cabinet: President of the Privy Council; Minister of Inland Revenue; Postmaster General; Secretary of State of Canada

John O'Connor PC (January 1, 1824 – November 3, 1887) was a Canadian politician and cabinet minister.

Born in Boston, Massachusetts, the son of Irish immigrants John and Mary O’Connor, he moved with his family to Essex County, Upper Canada in 1828.

A lawyer by training, he was elected to the 7th Parliament of the Province of Canada in 1863. In 1867, he was elected to the 1st Canadian Parliament representing the riding of Essex. He was re-elected to the 2nd Canadian Parliament but was defeated in the 1874 federal election. In the period of 1872 to 1873, he was President of the Privy Council, Minister of Inland Revenue, and Postmaster General.

He was re-elected again in the 1878 federal election for the riding of Russell. From 1878 to 1880, he again was the President of the Privy Council. As well he was the Postmaster General in 1880 and from 1881 to 1882. From 1880 to 1881, he was the Secretary of State of Canada.

In 1884, he was appointed a judge of the Court of Queen’s Bench for Ontario.

== Electoral history ==
1875 Ontario general election: Ottawa
Party	Candidate	Votes	%	±%
Liberal	Daniel John O'Donoghue	852	35.35	−34.37
Liberal	J. P. Featherston	800	33.20	−36.53
Conservative	John O'Connor	758	31.45	
Total valid votes		2,410	54.25	
Eligible voters		4,442		
Liberal hold		Swing		−34.37
Source: Elections Ontario

1878 Canadian federal election
Party	Candidate	Votes
Conservative	John O'Connor	1,612
Unknown	Ira Morgan	1,097

By-election: On Mr. O'Connor being appointed President of the Privy Council, 4 November 1878
Party	Candidate	Votes
Conservative	John O'Connor	acclaimed
