= James Blackburn (politician) =

Canadian politician

James Blackburn (July 22, 1799 – 1851) was a businessman and political figure in Lower Canada.

He was born in Glasgow, Scotland, in 1799 and came to the Gatineau River region around 1830 to join other members of his family. He was the first person to operate a steamboat service on the Ottawa River near Aylmer. Blackburn was elected to the Legislative Assembly of Lower Canada for the County of Ottawa in 1834.

He died of cholera in Beardstown, Illinois in 1851.

His nephew, Robert Blackburn, served as a member of the House of Commons.
