= Elements of national security =

National security has a number of component elements which, when individually satisfied, provide a nation with security of its values, interests and freedom to choose policy. These are listed differently by various authorities. Besides the military aspect of security, the aspects of politics, society, environment, energy and natural resources, and, economics are commonly listed. The elements of national security correlate closely to the concept of the elements of national power.

== Choice of elements ==
As in the case of national power, the military aspect of security is an important, but not the sole, component of national security. To be truly secure, a nation needs other forms of security. Authorities differ in their choice of nation security elements.

=== Romm ===
Joseph J. Romm, an American physicist, climate change and energy security expert, in his 1993 book Defining national security: the nonmilitary aspects takes Ullman's 1983 definition of threat as a starting point and lists security from narcotic cartels, economic security, environmental security and energy security as the non-military elements of national security.

=== Paleri ===
Prabhakaran Paleri, an Indian academician, lists a larger number of elements in his book National Security: Imperatives And Challenges (2008):

- Military security
- Economic security
- Resource security
- Border Security
- Demographic security
- Disaster security
- Energy security
- Geostrategic security
- Informational security
- Food security
- Health security
- Ethnic security
- Environmental security
- Cyber security
- Genomic security

Paleri has chosen these elements keeping in mind that each term should be a fundamentally whole concept, universally applicable, of macro-level social impact and directly affecting human life; continuously under threat; uninterrupted in continuity from its origin in its existence, even though this may be periodic; and, currently in vogue in the current language of natural security, in addition to a number of other attributes. Paleri also examines and rejects certain terms, commonly found in discussions on national security, such as "homeland security", "terrorism", "social security" etc.
