= Joseph Daniel Nault =

Canadian politician

Joseph Nault

Ontario MPP
- In office 1948–1954
- Preceded by: Romeo Bégin
- Succeeded by: Gordon Lavergne
- Constituency: Russell

Personal details
- Born: August 19, 1888; Ottawa, Ontario
- Died: March 18, 1954 (aged 65); Ottawa, Ontario
- Political party: Progressive Conservative
- Spouses: Alice Charlebois (m. 1912; died 1924) Antonia Perisien (m. 1924)
- Profession: Merchant

Joseph Daniel Nault (August 19, 1888 – March 18, 1954) was an Ontario political figure. He represented Russell in the Legislative Assembly of Ontario as a Progressive Conservative from 1948 to 1954.

He was born in Ottawa, Ontario in 1888, the son of Georges Nault. In 1912, he married Alice Charlebois; in 1924, he married Antonia Parisien after the death of his first wife. Nault died in office in 1954.
