= Camille Gladu =

Canadian politician

Camille Gladu (October 20, 1872 – November 5, 1921) was the first mayor of Eastview, Ontario, later known as Vanier.

Gladu was born in Clarence Creek, Ontario in 1872. In 1880, his family came to Janeville. He became a butcher by trade. In 1909, Janeville became part of the village of Eastview and, in 1911, Gladu was elected prefect. When Eastview became a town two years later, he continued as mayor until 1916 when he lost the position to John Herbert White. He then took the office of Chief of Police. In 1920, Gladu ran for mayor against White and lost, but protested the election due to voting irregularities. He was declared mayor.

He died in 1921 of complications related to diabetes while still in office.
