= Honoré Robillard =

Canadian politician

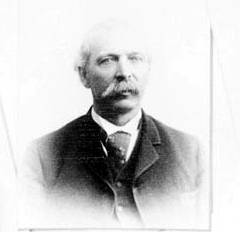

Ontario MPP
- In office 1883–1886
- Preceded by: Adam J. Baker
- Succeeded by: Alexander Robillard
- Constituency: Russell

Personal details
- Born: January 12, 1835 Saint-Eustache, Lower Canada
- Died: June 13, 1914 (aged 79) Ottawa, Ontario, Canada
- Party: Conservative
- Spouses: Philomène Barrette (m. 1860–1879) Marie E.G. Richer (m. 1879)
- Relations: Alexander Robillard, brother
- Occupation: Prospector

Honoré Robillard (January 12, 1835 – June 13, 1914) was a Liberal-Conservative Member of the House of Commons of Canada for Ottawa City from 1887 to 1896 and a provincial Conservative Member of the Legislative Assembly of Ontario for Russell from 1883 to 1886. He was first elected to the Ontario legislature by defeating his brother, Alexander, who was the Liberal candidate.

He was born in Saint-Eustache in Lower Canada in 1835, the son of Antoine Robillard and Émilie Loriau, and studied in Ottawa. At the age of 17, he left for the gold fields of Australia, returning to Canada in 1858, by way of England. Robillard married Philomène Barrette in 1860. In 1862, he travelled to British Columbia, again in search of gold, and was employed in building the first wagon road in the province. Robillard returned to Ottawa in 1864 by way of Oregon. He was involved in the operation of quarries, providing material for construction in Gloucester Township. He served as reeve for the township in 1873. Robillard was also a lieutenant in the militia and a justice of the peace. In 1879, he married Marie E.G. Richer after the death of his first wife. In 1883, Robillard became the first Francophone member of the Ontario Legislature. He died in Ottawa at the age of 79.
