= Joseph-Omer Gour =

Canadian politician

Joseph-Omer Gour (born Joseph-Omer Gourd; November 12, 1893 – March 24, 1959) was an Ontario farmer, merchant and political figure. He represented Russell in the House of Commons of Canada as a Liberal member from 1945 to 1959.

He was born in St-Victor D'Alfred, Ontario in 1893, the son of Wilfrid Gour and Eliza Marleau, and was educated in Alfred and Plantagenet. He lived in Casselman. In 1929, he married Aurore Laurin. Gour served as mayor of Casselman from 1930 to 1935. His older brother, David Gourd also served in the House of Commons. He died in office in Ottawa in 1959.

== Electoral record ==
1945 Canadian federal election: Russell
Party	Candidate	Votes
Liberal	Joseph-Omer Gour	5,519
Progressive Conservative	Frederic-A. Caillier	3,271
Independent	Antonin Lalonde	2,708
Co-operative Commonwealth	Thomas Keenan	600
Social Credit	Harvey Turner	340

1949 Canadian federal election: Russell
Party	Candidate	Votes
Liberal	Joseph-Omer Gour	12,635
Progressive Conservative	Moïse Gendron	5,767
Co-operative Commonwealth	Ernest Cousineau	1,112
Social Credit	Adrien-Joseph Papineau	538

1953 Canadian federal election: Russell
Party	Candidate	Votes
Liberal	Joseph-Omer Gour	15,969
Progressive Conservative	Joseph E. Charron	6,470
Co-operative Commonwealth	Ernest Cousineau	1,157
Social Credit	Alexandre Denommée	519

1957 Canadian federal election: Russell
Party	Candidate	Votes
Liberal	Joseph-Omer Gour	20,673
Progressive Conservative	Wilbur Nixon	12,271
Co-operative Commonwealth	Harry Jacks	1,420
Social Credit	Eddie Parisien	1,161

1958 Canadian federal election: Russell
Party	Candidate	Votes
Liberal	Joseph-Omer Gour	21,575
Progressive Conservative	Wilbur Nixon	19,464
Co-operative Commonwealth	Harry Jacks	1,224
Social Credit	Eddie Parisien	594
