= David Langelier =

Political figure in Ontario, Canada

David Langelier (February 1883 – November 22, 1942) was a political figure in Ontario, Canada. He served as mayor of Eastview in 1931 and 1932.

He was born in Saint-Barnabé, Quebec, the son of Pierre Langelier, and was educated in Saint-Hyacinthe and Ottawa. Langelier worked as a clerk with the Ontario Ministry of Transportation. In 1907, he married Florida Paquette. He became manager of the Caisse Populaire in Eastview in 1918. Langelier was elected to the municipal council for Eastview in 1924 and was elected prefect in 1924 and 1927. He ran unsuccessfully for the position of mayor in 1928. Langelier defeated G.H. Alex Collins in December 1930 to become mayor of Eastview. He was defeated by Donat Grandmaître when he ran for reelection in December 1932. Langelier moved to Ottawa, where he was employed as a salesperson by L. P. Marcotte Ltée. He died at his eldest daughter's home in Montreal at the age of 69.

== See also ==
- Politics of Canada
- Saint-Barnabé, Quebec
