= Joseph Ulric Vincent =

Canadian lawyer

Joseph Ulric Vincent, KC (b.c.1873 — May 12, 1942) was a Canadian lawyer and civil servant.

== Biography ==
Born in Ottawa, Vincent was educated at the University of Ottawa, then Osgoode Hall. He began practising law in 1897 and his firm still exists today as Vincent, Dagenais, and Gibson.

In January 1901, he was elected alderman of the city of Ottawa.

He was created a provincial King's Counsel in 1910. A Conservative in politics, Vincent unsuccessfully contested the district of Russell in the 1911 Canadian federal election. His attack on the popular Wilfrid Laurier is blamed by some for his defeat.

In 1913, he was appointed Assistant Deputy Minister of Inland Revenue. He served as Deputy Minister of Inland Revenue from 1914 until 1918.

A prominent Franco-Ontarian, Vincent was key in the establishment of the Association canadienne-française d'éducation de l'Ontario. The Association later opposed him in the 1911 general election.

He was heavily involved in the Ontario schools controversy, although he later wrote defending Regulation 17. According to Vincent opposition to Regulation 17 was a Liberal conspiracy. The resulting document was described by Henri Bourassa as 'contemptible'. He was defended, however, by ministers, as he was a deputy minister when he wrote the document.

According to the scholar David Fraser, "Vincent played an important role in the creation of an organizational structure for an emerging Franco-Ontarian identity. He symbolized the deep connection between language and faith that characterized that identity."

== Personal life ==
Joseph Ulric Vincent married Gratia Baron in 1898. They had four daughters: Marie-Ange, Marcelle, Gabrielle, and Georgette.
