= William Cameron Edwards =

Canadian politician

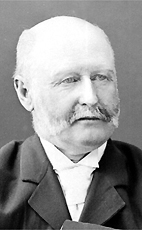
William Cameron Edwards

William Cameron Edwards (7 May 1844 – 17 September 1921) was a Canadian businessman and parliamentarian.

He was born in Clarence Township in Russell County, Canada West the son of William Edwards and Ann Cameron, received basic schooling in Ottawa at the District Grammar School and, at a young age, began work in the timber industry at Thurso, Quebec. He founded W.C. Edwards & Company which built large sawmills at Rockland and New Edinburgh. Up until 1920, Edwards' company also operated a sawmill on the Petite-Nation River in Quebec at North Nation Mills, north of Plaisance.

In 1885, he married Catherine Wilson.

A Liberal, he was five times elected as a Member of Parliament representing the Ontario electoral district of Russell. He was first elected in the Canadian federal election of 1887, and was re-elected in 1888, 1891, 1896 and 1900. On 17 March 1903 he was appointed to the Senate of Canada upon the recommendation of Sir Wilfrid Laurier. He represented the senatorial division of Russell County, Ontario until his death in Ottawa.

At one time, Edwards owned the residence at 24 Sussex Drive, having purchased it from Joseph Merrill Currier in 1902. Ironically his nephew Cameron Macpherson Edwards's home, Harrington Lake, is now the country retreat of the Prime Minister of Canada.

Edwards was also president of Canada Cement Company, was a noted livestock breeder and served as president of the Russell Agricultural Society.

His nephew Gordon Cameron Edwards also served in the House of Commons of Canada.

== Electoral record ==
1882 Canadian federal election: Russell
Party	Candidate	Votes
Conservative	Moss Kent Dickinson	1,644
Liberal	William Cameron Edwards	1,335
Source: open.canada.ca

1887 Canadian federal election: Russell
Party	Candidate	Votes
Liberal	William Cameron Edwards	2,301
Conservative	Charles Herbert Mackintosh	2,146
Source: open.canada.ca

By-election: On Mr. Edwards being unseated for bribery, 7 May 1888
Party	Candidate	Votes
Liberal	William Cameron Edwards	2,166
Unknown	Charles Herbert Mackintosh	1,963
Source: open.canada.ca

1891 Canadian federal election: Russell
Party	Candidate	Votes
Liberal	William Cameron Edwards	2,308
Conservative	Moss Kent Dickinson	1,895
Source: lop.parl.ca

1896 Canadian federal election: Russell
Party	Candidate	Votes
Liberal	William Cameron Edwards	2,983
Conservative	E. N. Hurtibise	1,380
Independent	G. J. Wilson	1,093
Source: open.canada.ca

1900 Canadian federal election: Russell
Party	Candidate	Votes
Liberal	William Cameron Edwards	3,089
Conservative	George Halsey Perley	2,523
Source: open.canada.ca
