= Vanier, Ontario =

Neighbourhood in Ottawa, Ontario

Vanier
- Neighbourhood
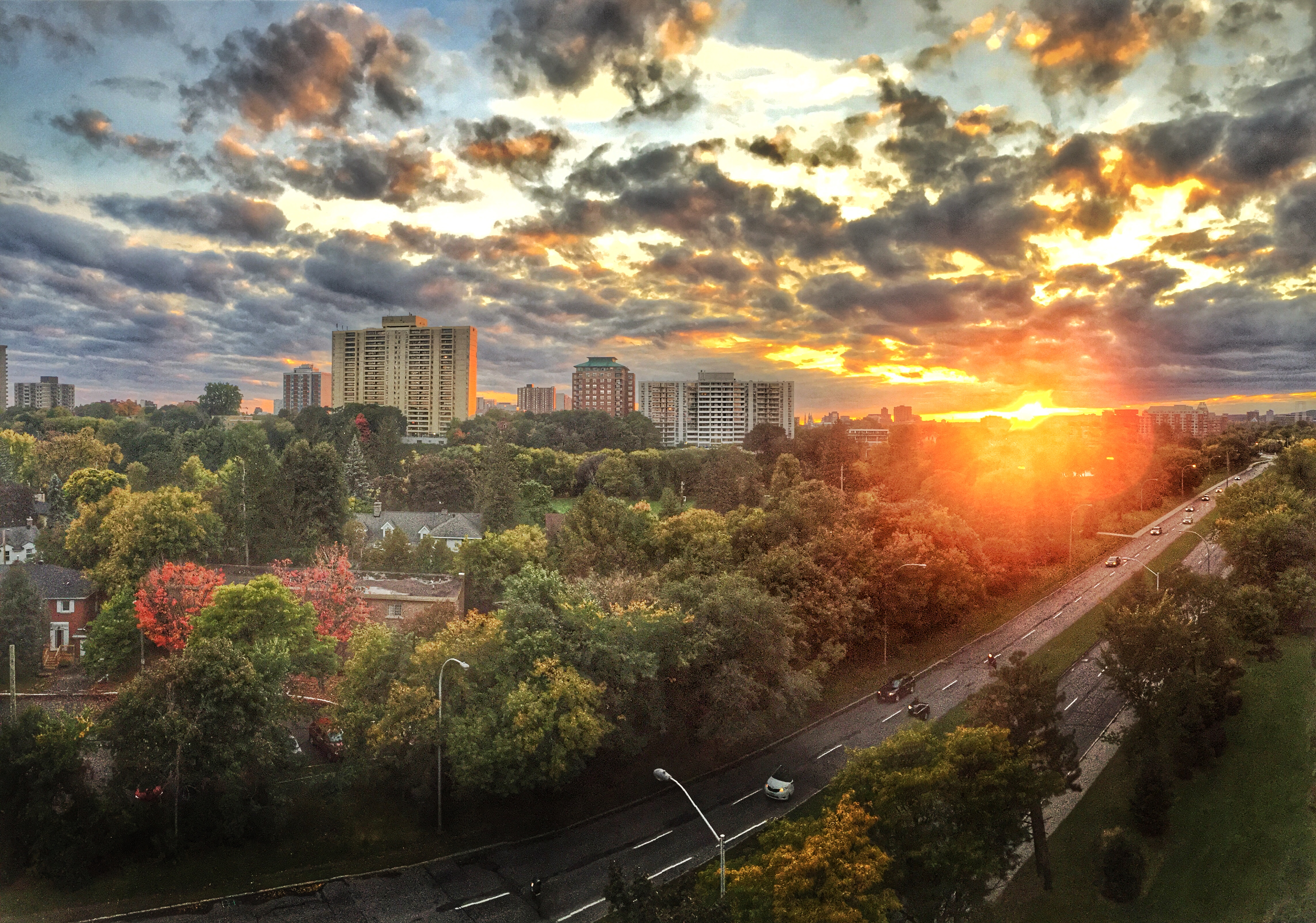

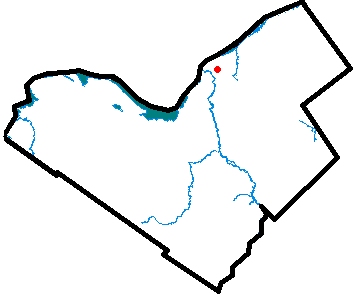
- Location of Vanier within the City of Ottawa
- Coordinates: 45°26′23″N 75°39′54″W
- Country: Canada
- Province: Ontario
- City: Ottawa

Area
  - Total: 2.93 km^{2} (1.13 sq mi)

Population (2021)
  - Total: 17,757
- Time zone: UTC−05:00 (EST)
  - Summer (DST): UTC−04:00 (EDT)

Vanier (formerly Eastview) is a neighborhood in the Rideau-Vanier Ward of the east end of Ottawa, Ontario, Canada. Historically francophone and working class, the neighborhood was a separate city until being amalgamated into Ottawa in 2001. It no longer has a majorly francophone population. By 2012 its francophone population had shrunk to less than 40% from 63% in the early 1980s. The neighborhood is located on the east bank of the Rideau River, across from the neighborhoods of Lowertown and Sandy Hill, and just south of Rockcliffe Park, New Edinburgh, Lindenlea, and Manor Park. To the east of Vanier are the suburbs of Gloucester. Vanier has a relatively small area with a high population density.

== History ==
In 1908, the communities of Janeville, Clarkstown, and Clandeboye were joined to form the village of Eastview. Janeville had been located along the west end of Montreal Road, between what is now Deschamps and McArthur. Clarkstown was located north of Deschamps and west of Marier, while Clandeboye was further east between Montreal Road on the south, the Beechwood Cemetery to the north and Notre-Dame Cemetery to the east.

In 1913, Eastview was incorporated as a town. Originally it was a popular destination for civil servants who wished to live at a distance from downtown. It later saw a large influx of French Canadians and became the main francophone area in the capital.

During the Great Depression, Eastview held the attention of the entire nation, as it became a public forum for national debates on birth control during the Eastview Birth Control Trial, which lasted from 1936 to 1937. Significant controversy erupted when Dorothea Palmer was arrested for distributing birth control information to the poorer, predominantly Catholic neighbourhoods. Later, in 1963 it became a city, and in 1969 was renamed after the recently deceased Governor General of Canada, Georges Vanier.

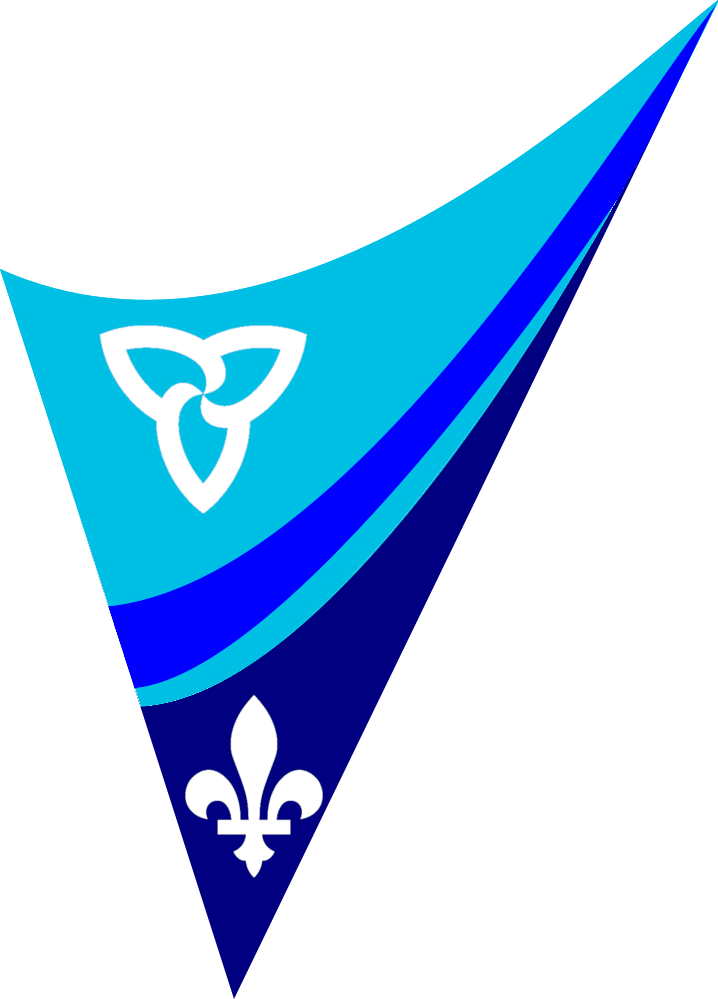
Former Crest of the City of Vanier before dissolution.

The City of Eastview erected a memorial at the intersection of Marier Avenue, Dagmar Avenue and Hannah Street. It is dedicated to citizens from Eastview who gave their lives in Canadian military conflicts.

== Present ==
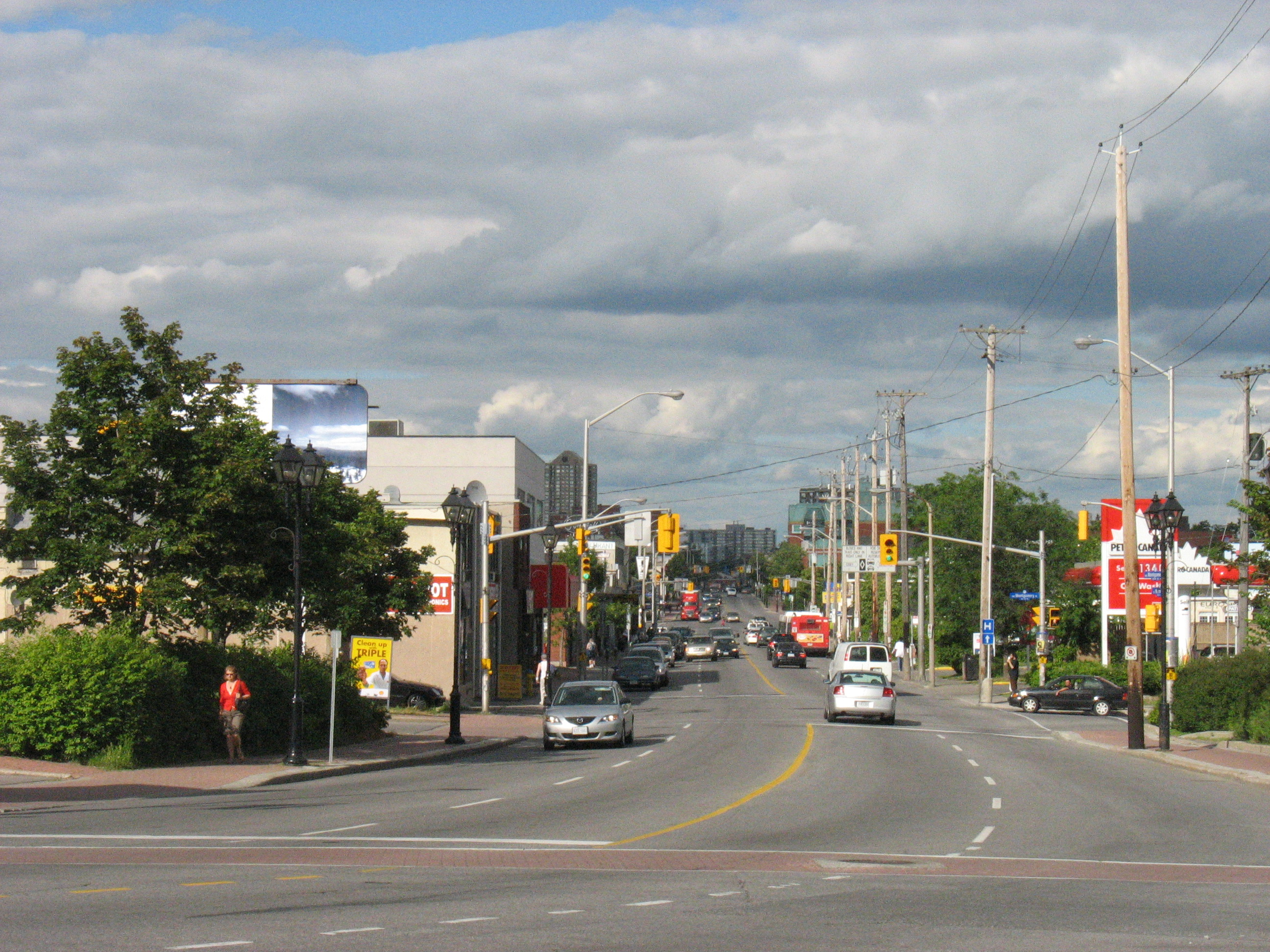
Montreal Road runs through the centre of Vanier.

Starting with an area closer to the Rideau River, Vanier is increasingly being earmarked for gentrification. It is one of the last relatively inexpensive Ottawa neighborhoods with a location next to downtown. The neighborhood is becoming increasingly popular with young families thanks to the only publicly funded school in Ottawa based on Waldorf education, Trille-des-Bois, boasting a standard for publicly funded schools. Vanier also has active community association.

Vanier boasts a wide range of retail shops, strip malls, eateries, and bars. Both subsidized and self-financed housing is available here, along with several existing and proposed upscale condominiums and in-fill developments. The population on the western edge of Vanier closer to the Rideau River, notably the Kingsview Park neighbourhood, is among the most affluent.

As with nearby Lowertown, Ottawa's Vanier neighbourhood is home to a number of French-speaking immigrants from Africa and elsewhere. It is home to the only (as of 2026) urban sugar shack in Canada, which hosts a Maple Sugar Festival (Festival des Sucres) on its 17.5-acre sugar bush each spring. Also present is an outdoor Catholic shrine, La Grotte-de-Lourdes.

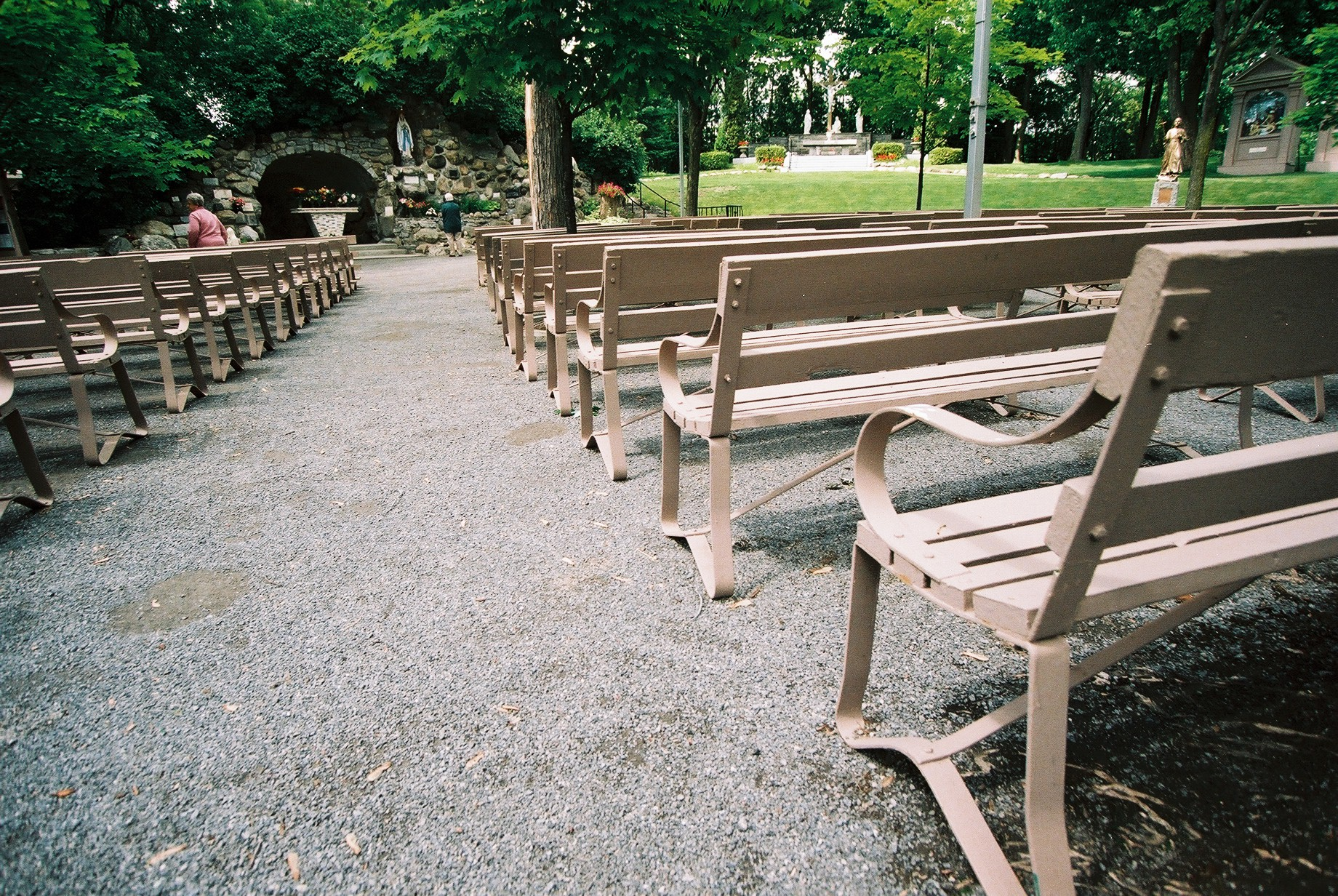
Outdoor Catholic shrine, Grotte de Lourdes in the Vanier neighbourhood of Ottawa

The neighbourhood has two ridings, one federal and one provincial, both named Ottawa—Vanier, and are represented by MP Mona Fortier (Liberal) federally and MPP Lucille Collard (Ontario Liberal) provincially. It is one of the staunchly Liberal federal ridings in Canada, having voted for the party consistently since its creation in 1935.

Former city
Year	Pop.	±%
1911	3,169	—
1921	5,324	+68.0%
1931	6,686	+25.6%
1941	7,966	+19.1%
1951	13,799	+73.2%
1961	24,555	+77.9%
1971	22,477	−8.5%
1976	19,812	−11.9%
1981	18,792	−5.1%
1986	18,165	−3.3%
1991	18,150	−0.1%
1996	17,247	−5.0%
2001	17,632	+2.2%
2006	15,726	−10.8%
2011	16,258	+3.4%
2016	16,609	+2.2%
2021	17,757	+6.9%

== List of former mayors ==
Mayors of Eastview:

- 1913: Camille Gladu
- 1916: John Herbert White
- 1918: Arthur Desrosiers
- 1920: John Herbert White/Camille Gladu
- 1922: Arthur Desrosiers
- 1923: Arthur Guilbault
- 1924: Arthur Desrosiers
- 1928: G.H. Alex Collins
- 1931: David Langelier
- 1933: Donat Grandmaître
- 1936: Jean-Baptiste Charette
- 1937: Donat Grandmaître
- 1949: Gordon Lavergne
- 1961: Oscar Perrier

Mayors of Vanier:

- 1965: Gérard Grandmaître
- 1970: Roger Crête
- 1973: Gérard Grandmaître
- 1974: Bernard Grandmaître
- 1980: Wilfrid Champagne
- 1982: Bernard Grandmaître
- 1985: Gisèle Lalonde
- 1991: Guy Cousineau

== See also ==
- List of neighbourhoods in Ottawa
- 2015 Ottawa Larmond twins terror conspiracy
