= Legislature of Ontario =

Legislature of Canadian province

- 44th Parliament of Ontario
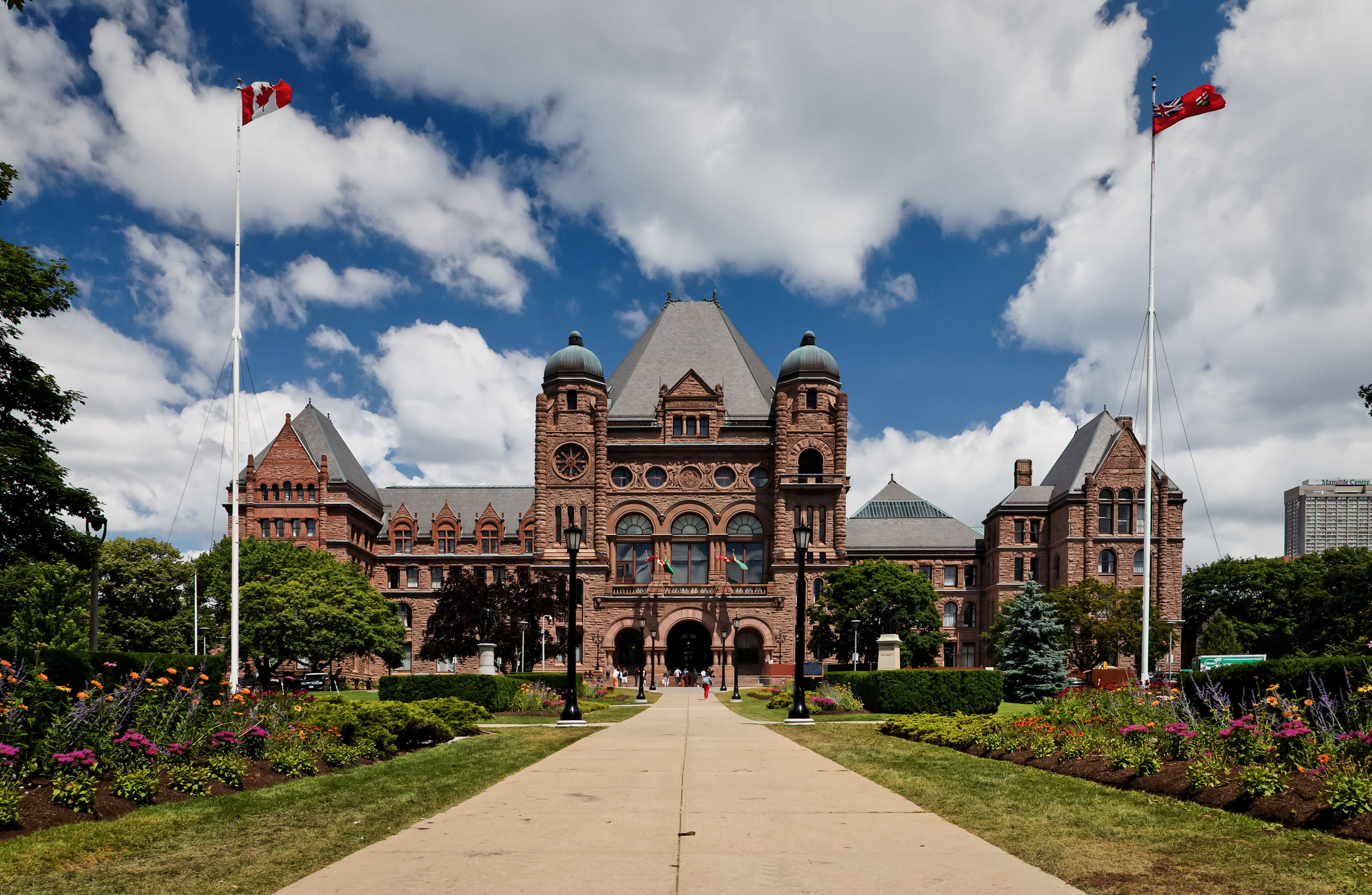
- Ontario Legislative Building at Queen's Park

Type
- Type: Unicameral
- Houses: Legislative Assembly
- Sovereign: King of Canada, in right of Ontario (represented by the Lieutenant Governor)

History
- Founded: July 1, 1867
- Preceded by: Parliament of the Province of Canada

Leadership
- Monarch: Charles III; September 8, 2022
- Lieutenant Governor: Edith Dumont; November 14, 2023
- Speaker of the Legislative Assembly: Donna Skelly, PC; April 14, 2025
- Premier: Doug Ford, PC; June 29, 2018
- Leader of the Opposition: Marit Stiles, NDP; February 4, 2023

The Legislature of Ontario (often colloquially referred to as the Provincial Parliament of Ontario) is the legislature of the Province of Ontario, the most populous subnational jurisdiction within Canada.

The current legislature was established in 1867 upon the creation of Ontario as one of the first four provinces at Canadian Confederation. It is one of the three successor legislatures of the Parliament of the Province of Canada (along with the Parliament of Canada and the provincial Parliament of Quebec). The legislature is composed of two elements: the lieutenant governor of Ontario (representing the King of Canada), and the elected Legislative Assembly of Ontario.

Unlike most other provinces, Ontario's provincial legislators are not referred to as members of the Legislative Assembly (MLAs), having instead adopted the title of member of Provincial Parliament (MPP), a title that was formally adopted by resolution of the legislature in 1938.

The seat of the Legislature has been the Ontario Legislative Building, located in Queen's Park, an actual urban park located in the city of Toronto that was named in honour of Queen Victoria. For that reason, the term Queen's Park is used as an informal moniker for the building or the legislature itself at a variety of settings.

== List of Parliaments ==
This is a list of Ontario's provincial parliamentary terms since the legislature's formal creation upon Canadian Confederation in 1867. For parliaments of Ontario's predecessor jurisdictions, please see:

- Parliament of the Province of Canada (1841 to 1867) (list)
- Parliament of Upper Canada (1791 to 1841) (list)

Assembly Seats/Sessions	Election (ministry formed) dissolution	Conservative/Progressive Conservative New Democratic Party Co-operative Commonwealth Federation Liberal United Farmers of Ontario Labour		
Assembly Seats/Sessions	Election (ministry formed) dissolution	Premier (ministry) Command of parliament	Leader of the opposition of other recognized parties	Speaker
1st Parliament; 82 seats, 4 sessions	September 3, 1867; February 25, 1871	John Sandfield Macdonald (ministry)	Archibald McKellar (de facto to Feb 1870); Edward Blake (from Feb 1870)	John Stevenson
2nd Parliament; 82 seats, 4 sessions	March 21, 1871	John Sandfield Macdonald (ministry)	Archibald McKellar (de facto to Feb 1870); Edward Blake (from Feb 1870)	Richard Scott (1871)
2nd Parliament; 82 seats, 4 sessions	December 19, 1871	Edward Blake (ministry); 40 / 74(54%) (Note: Eight seats were vacated the Sandfield Macdonald ministry was defeated.)	Matthew Crooks; Cameron (to 1878)	James Currie (1871–73); Rupert Wells (1874)
2nd Parliament; 82 seats, 4 sessions	October 25, 1872; December 21, 1874	Oliver Mowat (ministry); 2nd 59 / 88(67%); 3rd 51 / 88(58%); 4th 57 / 88(65%); 5th 50 / 88(57%); 6th 57 / 90(63%); 7th 55 / 91(60%); 8th 59 / 94(63%)	Matthew Crooks; Cameron (to 1878)	James Currie (1871–73); Rupert Wells (1874)
3rd Parliament; 88 seats, 4 sessions	January 18, 1875; April 25, 1879	Oliver Mowat (ministry); 2nd 59 / 88(67%); 3rd 51 / 88(58%); 4th 57 / 88(65%); 5th 50 / 88(57%); 6th 57 / 90(63%); 7th 55 / 91(60%); 8th 59 / 94(63%)	Matthew Crooks; Cameron (to 1878)	Rupert Wells
3rd Parliament; 88 seats, 4 sessions	January 18, 1875; April 25, 1879	Oliver Mowat (ministry); 2nd 59 / 88(67%); 3rd 51 / 88(58%); 4th 57 / 88(65%); 5th 50 / 88(57%); 6th 57 / 90(63%); 7th 55 / 91(60%); 8th 59 / 94(63%)	William Ralph; Meredith (from 1878)	Rupert Wells
4th Parliament; 88 seats, 4 sessions	June 5, 1879; February 1, 1883	Oliver Mowat (ministry); 2nd 59 / 88(67%); 3rd 51 / 88(58%); 4th 57 / 88(65%); 5th 50 / 88(57%); 6th 57 / 90(63%); 7th 55 / 91(60%); 8th 59 / 94(63%)	William Ralph; Meredith (from 1878)	Charles Clarke
5th Parliament; 88 seats, 3 sessions	February 27, 1883; November 15, 1886	Oliver Mowat (ministry); 2nd 59 / 88(67%); 3rd 51 / 88(58%); 4th 57 / 88(65%); 5th 50 / 88(57%); 6th 57 / 90(63%); 7th 55 / 91(60%); 8th 59 / 94(63%)	William Ralph; Meredith (from 1878)	Charles Clarke
6th Parliament; 90 seats, 4 sessions	December 28, 1886; April 26, 1890	Oliver Mowat (ministry); 2nd 59 / 88(67%); 3rd 51 / 88(58%); 4th 57 / 88(65%); 5th 50 / 88(57%); 6th 57 / 90(63%); 7th 55 / 91(60%); 8th 59 / 94(63%)	William Ralph; Meredith (from 1878)	Jacob Baxter
7th Parliament; 91 seats, 4 sessions	June 5, 1890; May 29, 1894	Oliver Mowat (ministry); 2nd 59 / 88(67%); 3rd 51 / 88(58%); 4th 57 / 88(65%); 5th 50 / 88(57%); 6th 57 / 90(63%); 7th 55 / 91(60%); 8th 59 / 94(63%)	William Ralph; Meredith (from 1878)	Thomas Ballantyne
8th Parliament; 94 seats, 4 sessions	June 26, 1894	Oliver Mowat (ministry); 2nd 59 / 88(67%); 3rd 51 / 88(58%); 4th 57 / 88(65%); 5th 50 / 88(57%); 6th 57 / 90(63%); 7th 55 / 91(60%); 8th 59 / 94(63%)	George Marter (to 1896)	William Balfour (to 1896)
8th Parliament; 94 seats, 4 sessions	July 21, 1896; January 28, 1898	Arthur Hardy (ministry); 8th 62 / 93(67%); 9th 51 / 94(54%)	James Whitney	Francis Evanturel (from 1897)
9th Parliament; 94 seats, 5 sessions	March 1, 1898	Arthur Hardy (ministry); 8th 62 / 93(67%); 9th 51 / 94(54%)	James Whitney	Francis Evanturel (from 1897)
9th Parliament; 94 seats, 5 sessions	October 20, 1899; April 19, 1902	George Ross (ministry); 9th 50 / 91(55%); 10th 50 / 98(51%)	James Whitney	Francis Evanturel (from 1897)
10th Parliament; 98 seats, 2 sessions	May 29, 1902; December 13, 1904	George Ross (ministry); 9th 50 / 91(55%); 10th 50 / 98(51%)	James Whitney	William Charlton
11th Parliament; 98 seats, 4 sessions	January 25, 1905; May 2, 1908	James Whitney (ministry); 11th 70 / 98(71%); 12th 86 / 106(81%); 13th 82 / 106(77%); 14th 84 / 111(76%)	George Ross (to Jan 1907); George P. Graham (to Sept 1907)	Joseph St. John (to 1907)
11th Parliament; 98 seats, 4 sessions	January 25, 1905; May 2, 1908	James Whitney (ministry); 11th 70 / 98(71%); 12th 86 / 106(81%); 13th 82 / 106(77%); 14th 84 / 111(76%)	Alexander Grant MacKay (from Sept 1907)	Thomas Crawford (from 1907)
12th Parliament; 106 seats, 3 sessions	June 8, 1908; November 13, 1911	James Whitney (ministry); 11th 70 / 98(71%); 12th 86 / 106(81%); 13th 82 / 106(77%); 14th 84 / 111(76%)	Alexander Grant MacKay (from Sept 1907)	Thomas Crawford (from 1907)
13th Parliament; 106 seats, 3 sessions	December 11, 1911; May 29, 1914	James Whitney (ministry); 11th 70 / 98(71%); 12th 86 / 106(81%); 13th 82 / 106(77%); 14th 84 / 111(76%)	Newton Rowell (resigned 1917)	William Hoyle
14th Parliament; 111 seats, 5 sessions	June 29, 1914	James Whitney (ministry); 11th 70 / 98(71%); 12th 86 / 106(81%); 13th 82 / 106(77%); 14th 84 / 111(76%)	Newton Rowell (resigned 1917)	David Jamieson
14th Parliament; 111 seats, 5 sessions	October 2, 1914; September 23, 1919	William Hearst (ministry); 84 / 111(76%)	William Proudfoot (from 1917)	David Jamieson
15th Parliament; 111 seats, 4 sessions	October 20, 1919; May 10, 1923	Ernest Drury (ministry): Walter Rollo (Note: Formally as part of coalition government, with two members in cabinet)	Hartley Dewart (to 1921); Wellington Hay (1921 onward): Howard Ferguson	Nelson Parliament
16th Parliament; 111 seats, 3 sessions	June 25, 1923; October 18, 1926	Howard Ferguson (ministry); 16th 75 / 111(68%); 17th 74 / 112(66%); 18th 92 / 112(82%)	W. E. N. Sinclair	Joseph Thompson
17th Parliament; 112 seats, 3 sessions	December 1, 1926; September 17, 1929	Howard Ferguson (ministry); 16th 75 / 111(68%); 17th 74 / 112(66%); 18th 92 / 112(82%)	W. E. N. Sinclair	William Black
18th Parliament; 112 seats, 5 sessions	October 30, 1929	Howard Ferguson (ministry); 16th 75 / 111(68%); 17th 74 / 112(66%); 18th 92 / 112(82%)	W. E. N. Sinclair	Thomas Kidd
18th Parliament; 112 seats, 5 sessions	December 16, 1930; May 16, 1934	George Stewart Henry (ministry); 91 / 112(81%)	W. E. N. Sinclair	Thomas Kidd
19th Parliament; 90 seats, 3 sessions	June 19, 1934; August 25, 1937	Mitchell Hepburn (ministry); 19th 70 / 90(78%); 20th 66 / 90(73%)	George Stewart Henry (to 1939)	Norman Hipel(to 1938)
20th Parliament; 90 seats, 8 sessions	October 6, 1937	Mitchell Hepburn (ministry); 19th 70 / 90(78%); 20th 66 / 90(73%)	George Stewart Henry (to 1939)	Norman Hipel(to 1938)
20th Parliament; 90 seats, 8 sessions	October 21, 1942	Gordon Daniel Conant (ministry); 62 / 84(74%)	George Drew (1939 onward)	James Clark (1939–43)
20th Parliament; 90 seats, 8 sessions	May 18, 1943; June 30, 1943	Harry Nixon (ministry); 61 / 82(74%)	George Drew (1939 onward)	James Clark (1939–43)
21st Parliament; 90 seats, 2 sessions	August 4, 1943; Mar. 24, 1945	George Drew (ministry); 21st 38 / 90(42%); 22nd 66 / 90(73%); 23rd 53 / 90(59%)	Ted Jolliffe: Harry Nixon	William James Stewart (to 1947)
22nd Parliament; 90 seats, 4 sessions	June 4, 1945; April 27, 1948	George Drew (ministry); 21st 38 / 90(42%); 22nd 66 / 90(73%); 23rd 53 / 90(59%)	Farquhar Oliver	William James Stewart (to 1947)
22nd Parliament; 90 seats, 4 sessions	June 4, 1945; April 27, 1948	George Drew (ministry); 21st 38 / 90(42%); 22nd 66 / 90(73%); 23rd 53 / 90(59%)	Farquhar Oliver	James Hepburn (from 1947)
23rd Parliament; 90 seats, 4 sessions	June 7, 1948	George Drew (ministry); 21st 38 / 90(42%); 22nd 66 / 90(73%); 23rd 53 / 90(59%)	Ted Jolliffe: Farquhar Oliver	M.C. Davies
23rd Parliament; 90 seats, 4 sessions	October 19, 1948	Thomas Laird Kennedy (ministry) 53 / 90(59%)	Ted Jolliffe: Farquhar Oliver	M.C. Davies
23rd Parliament; 90 seats, 4 sessions	May 4, 1949; October 6, 1951	Leslie Frost (ministry); 23rd 53 / 90(59%); 24th 79 / 90(88%); 25th 83 / 98(85%); 26th 71 / 98(72%)	Ted Jolliffe: Farquhar Oliver	M.C. Davies
24th Parliament; 90 seats, 5 sessions	November 22, 1951; May 2, 1955	Leslie Frost (ministry); 23rd 53 / 90(59%); 24th 79 / 90(88%); 25th 83 / 98(85%); 26th 71 / 98(72%)	Farquhar Oliver(to 1958)	M.C. Davies
25th Parliament; 98 seats, 5 sessions	June 9, 1955; May 4, 1959	Leslie Frost (ministry); 23rd 53 / 90(59%); 24th 79 / 90(88%); 25th 83 / 98(85%); 26th 71 / 98(72%)	Farquhar Oliver(to 1958)	Alfred Downer
25th Parliament; 98 seats, 5 sessions	June 9, 1955; May 4, 1959	Leslie Frost (ministry); 23rd 53 / 90(59%); 24th 79 / 90(88%); 25th 83 / 98(85%); 26th 71 / 98(72%)	John Wintermeyer (from 1958)	Alfred Downer
26th Parliament; 98 seats, 4 sessions	June 11, 1959	Leslie Frost (ministry); 23rd 53 / 90(59%); 24th 79 / 90(88%); 25th 83 / 98(85%); 26th 71 / 98(72%)	John Wintermeyer (from 1958)	William Murdoch
26th Parliament; 98 seats, 4 sessions	November 8, 1961; Aug. 16, 1963	John Robarts (ministry); 26th 70 / 98(71%); 27th 77 / 108(71%); 28th 69 / 117(59%)	John Wintermeyer (from 1958)	William Murdoch
27th Parliament; 108 seats, 5 sessions	September 25, 1963; September 5, 1967	John Robarts (ministry); 26th 70 / 98(71%); 27th 77 / 108(71%); 28th 69 / 117(59%)	Farquhar Oliver (to 1964); Andy Thompson (1964–66); Robert Nixon (from 1966)	Donald Morrow
28th Parliament; 117 seats, 4 sessions	October 17, 1967	John Robarts (ministry); 26th 70 / 98(71%); 27th 77 / 108(71%); 28th 69 / 117(59%)	Robert Nixon: Donald C. MacDonald (to 1970); Stephen Lewis (from 1970)	Frederick Cass
28th Parliament; 117 seats, 4 sessions	Mar. 1, 1971; September 13, 1971	Bill Davis (ministry); 28th 68 / 117(58%); 29th 78 / 117(67%); 30th 51 / 125(41%); 31st 58 / 125(46%); 32nd 70 / 125(56%)	Robert Nixon: Donald C. MacDonald (to 1970); Stephen Lewis (from 1970)	Frederick Cass
29th Parliament; 117 seats, 5 sessions	October 21, 1971; Aug. 11, 1975	Bill Davis (ministry); 28th 68 / 117(58%); 29th 78 / 117(67%); 30th 51 / 125(41%); 31st 58 / 125(46%); 32nd 70 / 125(56%)	Robert Nixon: Donald C. MacDonald (to 1970); Stephen Lewis (from 1970)	Allan Reuter (to 1974); Russell Rowe (from 1974)
30th Parliament; 125 seats, 4 sessions	September 18, 1975; April 29, 1977	Bill Davis (ministry); 28th 68 / 117(58%); 29th 78 / 117(67%); 30th 51 / 125(41%); 31st 58 / 125(46%); 32nd 70 / 125(56%)	Stephen Lewis: Robert Nixon (to 1976); Stuart Smith (from 1976)	Russell Rowe
31st Parliament; 125 seats, 4 sessions	June 9, 1977; February 2, 1981	Bill Davis (ministry); 28th 68 / 117(58%); 29th 78 / 117(67%); 30th 51 / 125(41%); 31st 58 / 125(46%); 32nd 70 / 125(56%)	Stuart Smith: Stephen Lewis (to 1978); Michael Cassidy (from 1978)	Jack Stokes
32nd Parliament; 125 seats, 4 sessions (70 of 125 seats)	March 19, 1981	Bill Davis (ministry); 28th 68 / 117(58%); 29th 78 / 117(67%); 30th 51 / 125(41%); 31st 58 / 125(46%); 32nd 70 / 125(56%)	Robert Nixon (to 1982): Michael Cassidy (to 1982)	John M. Turner
32nd Parliament; 125 seats, 4 sessions (70 of 125 seats)	February 8, 1985; March 25, 1985	Frank Miller (ministry); 32nd 72 / 125(58%); 33rd 52 / 125(42%)	David Peterson (from 1982): Bob Rae	John M. Turner
33rd Parliament; 125 seats, 3 sessions	May 2, 1985	Frank Miller (ministry); 32nd 72 / 125(58%); 33rd 52 / 125(42%)	David Peterson (from 1982): Bob Rae	Hugh Edighoffer
33rd Parliament; 125 seats, 3 sessions	June 26, 1985; July 31, 1987	David Peterson (ministry) 33rd (Note: Minority government with confidence and supply agreement with the NDP) 34th 95 / 130(73%)	Frank Miller (1985); Larry Grossman (from 1985): Bob Rae (Note: Provided government with support on confidence and supply matters, but did not serve in ministry)	Hugh Edighoffer
34th Parliament; 130 seats, 2 sessions	September 10, 1987; July 30, 1990	David Peterson (ministry) 33rd 34th 95 / 130(73%)	Bob Rae: Andy Brandt (to May 1990); Mike Harris (from May 1990)	Hugh Edighoffer
35th Parliament; 130 seats, 3 sessions	September 6, 1990; April 28, 1995	Bob Rae (ministry); 74 / 130(57%)	Robert Nixon, Murray Elston, Jim Bradley (interim, to 1992); Lyn McLeod (from 1992): Mike Harris	David Warner
36th Parliament; 130 seats, 3 sessions	June 8, 1995; May 5, 1999	Mike Harris (ministry); 36th 82 / 130(63%); 37th 59 / 103(57%)	Lyn McLeod (to 1996); Dalton McGuinty (from 1996): Bob Rae (to 1996); Howard Hampton (from 1996)	Al McLean (to 1996); Edward Doyle (1996); Chris Stockwell (from 1996)
37th Parliament; 103 seats, 4 sessions	June 3, 1999	Mike Harris (ministry); 36th 82 / 130(63%); 37th 59 / 103(57%)	Dalton McGuinty: Howard Hampton	Gary Carr
37th Parliament; 103 seats, 4 sessions	April 15, 2002; June 26, 2003	Ernie Eves (ministry); 57 / 103(55%)	Dalton McGuinty: Howard Hampton	Gary Carr
38th Parliament; 103 seats, 2 sessions	October 2, 2003; September 10, 2007	Dalton McGuinty (ministry); 38th 72 / 103(70%); 39th 71 / 107(66%); 40th 53 / 107(50%)	Ernie Eves (to 2004); John Tory (from 2004): Howard Hampton	Alvin Curling (to 2005); Michael A. Brown (from 2005)
39th Parliament; 107 seats, 2 sessions	October 10, 2007; September 7, 2011	Dalton McGuinty (ministry); 38th 72 / 103(70%); 39th 71 / 107(66%); 40th 53 / 107(50%)	Bob Runciman (to 2009); Tim Hudak (from 2009): Howard Hampton (to 2009); Andrea Horwath (from 2009)	Steve Peters
40th Parliament; 107 seats, 2 sessions	October 6, 2011; February 11, 2013	Dalton McGuinty (ministry); 38th 72 / 103(70%); 39th 71 / 107(66%); 40th 53 / 107(50%)	Tim Hudak: Andrea Horwath	Dave Levac
40th Parliament; 107 seats, 2 sessions	February 11, 2013; May 2, 2014	Kathleen Wynne (ministry); 40th 53 / 107(50%); 41st 58 / 107(54%)	Tim Hudak: Andrea Horwath	Dave Levac
41st Parliament; 107 seats, 3 sessions	June 12, 2014; May 8, 2018	Kathleen Wynne (ministry); 40th 53 / 107(50%); 41st 58 / 107(54%)	Jim Wilson (to 2015); Patrick Brown (2015–18); Vic Fedeli (2018): Andrea Horwath	Dave Levac
42nd Parliament; 124 seats, 2 sessions	June 7, 2018; May 3, 2022	Doug Ford (ministry); 42nd 76 / 124(61%); 43rd 83 / 124(67%); 44th 80 / 124(65%)	Andrea Horwath	Ted Arnott
43rd Parliament; 124 seats, 1 session	June 2, 2022; January 28, 2025	Doug Ford (ministry); 42nd 76 / 124(61%); 43rd 83 / 124(67%); 44th 80 / 124(65%)	Peter Tabuns (to Feb 2023); Marit Stiles (from 2023)	Ted Arnott
44th Parliament; 124 seats, 1 session	February 27, 2025 (current parliament)	Doug Ford (ministry); 42nd 76 / 124(61%); 43rd 83 / 124(67%); 44th 80 / 124(65%)	Marit Stiles: John Fraser	Donna Skelly

== Sources ==
- Ontario. "Historical Records". Past & Present MPPs. Office of the Legislative Assembly of Ontario. Archived from the original on March 16, 2007.
- Ontario. "Speakers of the Legislative Assembly of Ontario". The Speaker. Office of the Legislative Assembly of Ontario. Archived from the original on July 4, 2007.
