= 2nd Parliament of Ontario =

1870s legislature of Ontario, Canada

←	1st	3rd	→
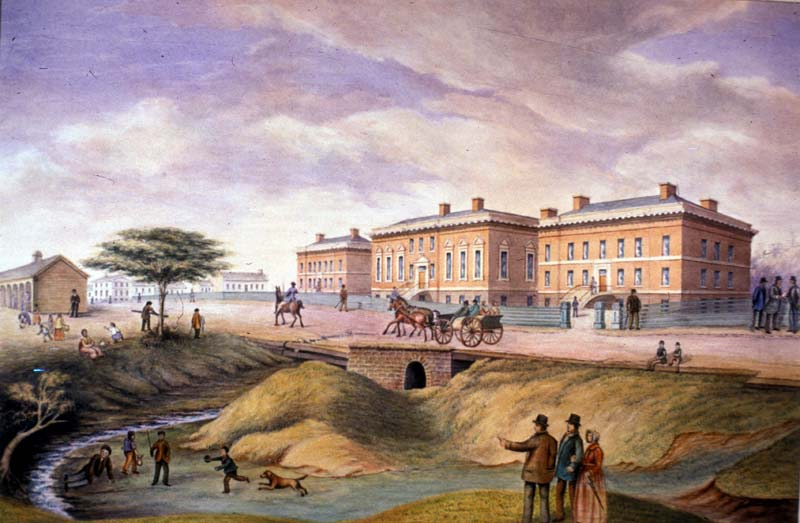
- First Ontario Parliament Buildings

Overview
- Legislative body: Legislative Assembly
- Jurisdiction: Ontario, Canada
- Meeting place: First Ontario Parliament Buildings
- Term: 1871 – 1875
- Election: 1871 Election
- Government: Sandfield Macdonald ministry (Conservative); Blake ministry, Mowat ministry (Liberal)
- Members: 82
- Speaker: Richard William Scott; James Currie; Rupert Mearse Wells
- Premier: J.S. Macdonald (1871); Edward Blake (1871–72); Oliver Mowat (1872–96)
- Leader of the Opposition: Edward Blake (1871); Matthew Crooks Cameron (1871–78)
- Party control: 43 / 82(52%)

The Second Parliament of Ontario (or the 2nd Legislature of Ontario, as it was known then) was the legislature of Ontario that consisted of representative elected in the Ontario general election held on March 21, 1871, and held office until December 23, 1874, just prior to the 1875 general election. It is now generally accepted that the Ontario Liberals led by Edward Blake have won a majority of the eighty-two seats in this legislature.

During the course of this legislature, the Edward Blake and his Liberal ministry replaced incumbent Premier John Sandfield Macdonald and his Patent Combination ministry in December 1871, effecting the province very first transition of power. The Blake ministry governed the province for only ten months. Blake and his finance minister Alexander Mackenzie, who later served as Prime Minister of Canada, along with a few key members on the Conservative side, resigned in late 1872 in order to contest the 1872 dominion election (as federal election was then known as). Blake however persuaded Oliver Mowat, a former member of a number of pre-confederation ministries, to resign his judicial role and succeed him as premier. The Mowat ministry, consisted of some members who served in the Blake ministry and some new members, took office on October 25, 1872. Accordingly, the first three Ontario Premiers – Macdonald, Blake, and Mowat – held office during the course of this parliament.

Richard William Scott served as speaker for the assembly until he was named to cabinet on December 21, 1871. James George Currie succeeded Scott as speaker, serving until his resignation on March 29, 1873. Rupert Mearse Wells then succeeded Currie as speaker.

There were 82 seats in the second legislature, 58 in the Liberal strongholds of Western, Central, and Northern Ontario, and 24 in much more conservative Eastern Ontario.

== Disputed election outcome ==
Even though the election was held in March 1871, its results was not reflected in the make up of the Ontario government until December that year. While it is now generally accepted that the Ontario Liberals led by Edward Blake secured a slim edge over the incumbent Conservatives led by Premier John Sandfield Macdonald, such an understanding was partially developed with the benefit of hindsight on a period during which the Liberals' ousted the Sandfield Macdonald ministry, commenced the building of a far more expansive administration, and within a year carried out an orderly transition of its party and the government leadership while largely remained stable and united, in doing so ushering in the longest-tenured ministry in the province's history. Few would have predicted the decades of stable government in the early months of this parliament, however, as the event followed the election harkened back to the disputes and gridlocks that plagued the government of the province of Ontario before confederation.

The results, as reported in formal records compiled in years by the Legislative Assembly and made available to the public (and in more recent years also reproduced by Elections Ontario) were as follows.

Elections to the 2nd Parliament of Ontario (1871)
Partisan Affiliation	Party leader	Seats				Votes (Note: 8 Conservatives and 7 Liberals were elected by acclamation and thus received no votes)			
Partisan Affiliation	Party leader	Candi- dates	1867	1871	±	Votes	±	%	± (%)
Liberal	Edward Blake	76	41	43	2▲	68,366	9,323▼	52.30%	3.54▲
Liberal–Conservative	John Sandfield Macdonald	73	41	38	3▼	59,926	20,185▼	45.85%	4.44▼
Conservative-Liberal	(label only)	1	–	1	n/a	1,116	n/a	0.85%	n/a
Others		9	–	–	–	1,303	n/a	1.00%	n/a
Total		159	82	82		130,711		100.00%	
Voter turnout						130,711	28,612▼	62.93	10.93▼
Registered electors						207,717	8,005▼		

Partisan affiliations were not recorded in contemporaneous formal elections record. Affiliations presented are the party affiliations as recorded in various resources maintained by the Legislative Assembly, which were not all compiled contemporaneously. Even contemporaneous affiliations data were a mixture of both formal undisputed declaration (made by the candidates or the parties), assessments by third parties such as the press, and presumptions from other events such as acceptance of specific offices. Such data inevitably contains some uncertainties, time lags, or inaccuracies, reflecting the lesser formality and permanence in partisan affiliation in that era.

Following the election, the incumbent Conservatives refused to concede and clung on to power for nine months until December 19, 1871. It claimed to commend the confidence of new parliament, but avoided testing that confidence by delaying the convocation of the new parliament seven times. While its reasoning were less than credible, the government was able to resisted calls for its resignation by leaning on uncertainties provided through a combination of factors.

=== Partisan allegiance not all certain ===
The room to dispute the overall election outcome stemmed from the uncertainty of political affiliation for some of the elected members, and from the fact that elected members' claimed political party affiliations were not the exclusive determining factor, and in some cases not even the main determining factor for their partisan allegiance. After all, the incumbent Conservative government was led by a former Liberal chosen by the national party leader in part to help legitimize the party's claim as a coalition.

In the months following the election, the press focused their analysis not on the elected members' professed partisan affiliations, but classified members as "ministerialists" committed to sustain the incumbent ministry versus those opposing the government. Known partisan affiliation were considered along with other factors such as family ties and previous behaviour, with the allegiances of certain members subject to extensive commentary and speculation. Unlike modern day election coverage, only a small number of outlets provided their summary tally of the likely strength of the two sides. The following are a few samples of reported tally. The early tallies reported 81 seats as the election for Algoma was held later on in May that year. The last tally reported in December that year took into account of seven vacancies caused by resignations and invalidations.

	Ministerialists	Opposition	Independent (or unknown)	Election undetermined	Total
Toronto Leader, 22 March 1871, p. 1	43	34	9	1	81
The Globe (Toronto), 23 March 1871, p. 2	32	41	7	1	81
Ottawa Free Press, 23 March 1871, p. 2	32	41	7	1	81
Sarnia Observer, 24 March 1871, p. 1	33	43	5		81
The Globe (Toronto), 6 December 1871, p. 2	29	40	6	7	82

=== Elections challenged and invalided ===
The election of elevens members were challenged under the newly adopted Controverted Elections Act of 1871. This prompted the incumbent ministry to delay the convening of parliament repeatedly over right months in the hopes that such challenges would results in its improved standing in the new parliament. Its standing was weakened rather than improved by the process however. While the election of members on both side of the aisle were challenged, the elections of five Conservatives but only one Liberal were invalidated. All six unseated members stood in the subsequent byelections and all but one were returned in the resulting byelections. However, since writs for byelection could only be moved while the legislature was in session, these six seats were vacant when parliament finally met for a number of weeks.

=== Double return ===
Liberal leader Edward Blake was re-elected in Bruce South and also in Durham West (where he was the MP), but would only be able to cast one vote in each division (vote) to take place in parliament. This effectively reduced the opposition Liberal rank by one until a replacement could be elected through a byelection. At that time, resignations could only take effect when the parliament was in session.

2nd Parliament of Ontario Liberal: 43 Conservative: 38
Conservative-Liberal: 1

seats vacated pending byelection when parliament first met in December 1871

== Government defeat ==
Parliament was called into session on Friday December 7, 1871. An additional Liberal member resigned on the fourth sitting day. By the time substantive debate regarding non-confidence on the government took place, eight seats were vacant, reducing the rank of the Conservatives by five and Liberals by three.

During the debate on the speech from the throne, the Sandfield Macdonald ministry suffered defeats in three recorded divisions on three consecutive days, respectively on December 13th, 14th, and 15th and each unmistakably expressed parliament's non-confidence on the ministry. The incumbent Conservative ministry initially refused to accept the recorded divisions as binding expression of non-confidence on the grounds that a tenth of the seats were vacant, but the government's position became untenable following the resignation of Provincial Treasurer Edmund Burke Wood on December 15 and defeats in two further recorded divisions on December 18, each by margin of close to 20 votes. Premier Macdonald announced the resignation of the ministry on December 19.

The transition of power mandated by this election was effected nine months after on December 20, 1971, with the formation of the province's first Liberal ministry led by Premier Edward Blake and featuring future Prime Minister Alexander Mackenzie as Treasurer. While Blake and Mackenzie remained in their provincial offices for only a year, the Liberal Party led the Ontario government for 33 more years after their departures.

Byelections for the eight vacancies noted, along with four ministerial byelections necessitated by the formation of the Blake ministry, were held in the following January. The two parties each gain a seat against the other, result in no change to their respective standings in parliament.

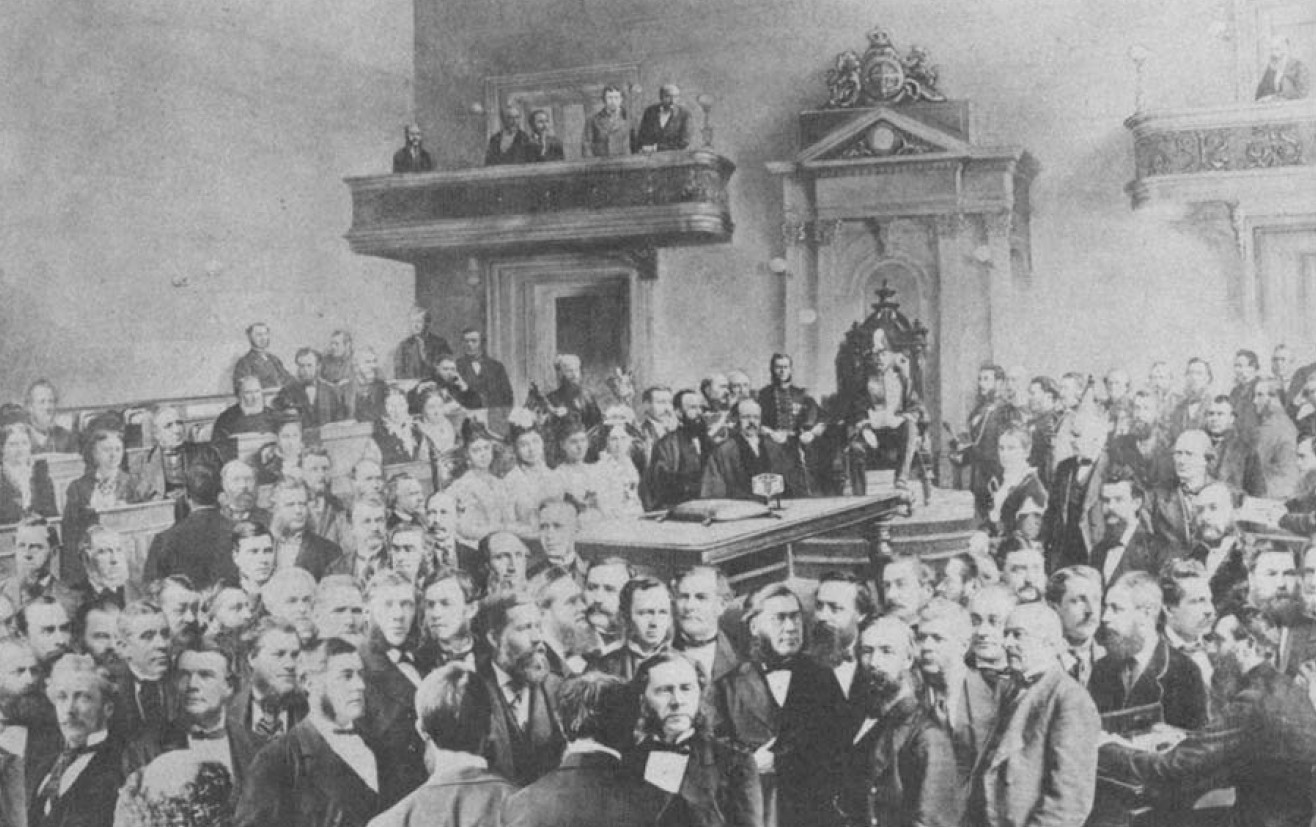
Parliament of Ontario 1872, an artistic composite of the members of the second Ontario Parliament after Premier Mowat entry in late 1872 and the departures of numerous prominent members. The women in the composite are presumably wives of the Mowat ministry members. The reason for their inclusion is unclear.

== Transition to the Mowat era ==
After a short tenure of a year, Blake resigned the premiership and his seat in the legislature departed to contest the 1872 dominion election. Departed with Blake was the Treasurer of his ministry Alexander Mackenzie. Blake led the national Liberal Party in three dominion elections (in 1872, 1882, and 1887) but was never able to secure the premiership of Canada. Mackenzie however was successful in doing so in 1874, and thus became the first Liberal Prime Minister of Canada.

Blake and George Brown, the spiritual leader of the Liberal movement, convinced their former colleagues Oliver Mowat to resign from the judicial bench and to return to electoral politics to succeed Blake. The move kicked off a three decade long Liberal rule in Ontario.

== Members ==
=== Key figures ===
Government		Opposition	
	Victoria (1837–1901) Queen of the United Kingdom (Note: Prior to the Statute of Westminster 1931, Canada was strictly speaking a dominion of the British Empire, thus did not have its own Crown per se.)		
William Pearce Howland (1868–1873); John Willoughby Crawford (1873–75) Lieutenant Governor
	Richard William Scott, Ottawa; James Currie, Welland; Rupert Mearse Wells, Bruce South Speaker		
Premier; Liberal Party Leader	Edward Blake (1871–72); Bruce South	Matthew Crooks Cameron; Toronto East	Leader of the Opposition; Conservative Party Leader
	Oliver Mowat (1873–96); Oxford North	John Sandfield Macdonald; Cornwall	Premier (1867–71)
Chief Government Whip; Liberal Whip			Conservative Whip

Riding	Member	Party	First elected / previously elected	No. of terms	Comments
Addington	Hammel Madden Deroche	Liberal	1871	1st term	
Algoma	Frederick William Cumberland	Conservative	1867	2nd term	
Bothwell	Archibald McKellar	Liberal	1867	2nd term	Commissioner of Agriculture and Public Works in Blake ministry after December 20, 1871, and the Mowat ministry until March 24, 1874
Brant	Hugh Finlayson	Liberal	1867	2nd term	
Brant South	Edmund Burke Wood	Conservative	1867	2nd term	Treasurer in Sandfield Macdonald ministry until December 20, 1871; resigned provincial seat April 1, 1872 to keep a seat in the federal parliament
Brant South	Arthur Sturgis Hardy (1873)	Liberal	1873	1st term	elected May 2, 1873
Brockville and Elizabethtown	William Fitzsimmons	Conservative	1867	2nd term	
Bruce North	Donald Sinclair	Liberal	1867	2nd term	
Bruce South	Edward Blake	Liberal	1867	2nd term	Leader of the Opposition until December 20, 1871; Premier and Attorney General in Blake ministry from December 20, 1871, until October 25, 1872; resigned provincial seat September 12, 1872 to keep a seat in the federal parliament; initially elected to two seats (the other being Durham West) Blake represents Bruce South as Premier
Bruce South	Rupert Mearse Wells (1872)	Liberal	1872	1st term	elected September 21, 1872; Speaker after March 29, 1873
Cardwell	George McManus	Liberal-Conservative	1871	1st term	
Carleton	George William Monk	Conservative	1871	1st term	
Cornwall	John Sandfield MacDonald	Conservative	1867	2nd term	Premier and Attorney General until December 20, 1871. John Sandfield Macdonald died on June 1, 1872
Cornwall	John Goodall Snetsinger (1872)	Liberal	1872	1st term	elected July 16, 1872
Dundas	Simon S. Cook	Liberal	1867	2nd term	
Durham East	Arthur Trefusis Heneage Williams	Conservative	1867	2nd term	
Durham West	Edward Blake	Liberal	1867	2nd term	Premier and Attorney General in Blake ministry from December 20, 1871, until October 25, 1872; resigned provincial seat September 12, 1872 to keep a seat in the federal parliament; initially elected to two seats (the other being Bruce South) Blake represents Bruce South as Premier
Durham West	John McLeod (1872)	Liberal	1867, 1872	2nd term*	
Elgin East	John Henry Wilson	Liberal	1871	1st term	
Elgin West	Thomas Hodgins	Liberal	1871	1st term	
Essex	Albert Prince	Liberal	1871	1st term	
Frontenac	Delino Dexter Calvin	Conservative	1868	2nd term	
Glengarry	James Craig	Conservative	1867	2nd term	
Grenville South	Mcneil Clarke	Conservative	1867	2nd term	died February 29, 1872
Grenville South	Christopher Finlay Fraser (1872)	Liberal	1872	1st term	elected March 30, 1872; Commissioner of Public Works in Mowat ministry after March 24, 1874
Grey North	Thomas Scott	Conservative	1867	2nd term	
Grey South	Abram William Lauder	Conservative	1867	2nd term	
Haldimand	Jacob Baxter	Liberal	1867	2nd term	
Halton	William Barber	Liberal	1867	2nd term	
Hamilton	James Miller Williams	Liberal	1867	2nd term	
Hastings East	Henry Corby	Conservative	1867	2nd term	
Hastings North	George Henry Boulter	Conservative	1867	2nd term	
Hastings West	Ketchum Graham	Conservative	1867	2nd term	
Huron North	Thomas Gibson	Liberal	1871	1st term	
Huron South	Robert Gibbons	Liberal	1867, 1871	2nd term*	resigned January 8, 1874 to accept an appointment as sheriff
Huron South	Archibald Bishop (1873)	Liberal	1873	1st term	elected October 16, 1873
Kent	James Dawson	Liberal	1871	1st term	
Kingston	William Robinson	Liberal	1871	1st term	Elected as independent, sided with the Liberals consistently
Lambton	Timothy Blair Pardee	Liberal	1867	2nd term	Commissioner of Crown Lands in Mowat ministry after December 4, 1873
Lanark North	Daniel Galbraith	Liberal	1867	2nd term	resigned August 1, 1872 to run (successfully) federally
Lanark North	William Clyde Caldwell (1872)	Liberal	1872	1st term	elected August 23, 1872
Lanark South	Abraham Code	Conservative	1869	2nd term	
Leeds North and Grenville North	Henry Merrick	Conservative	1871	1st term	
Leeds South	Herbert Stone MacDonald	Conservative	1871	1st term	resigned January 4, 1874 to accept an appointment as judge
Leeds South	John Godkin Giles (1873)	Conservative	1873	1st term	elected December 9, 1873
Lennox	John Thomas Grange	Conservative	1871	1st term	
Lincoln	John Charles Rykert	Conservative	1867	2nd term	
London	John Carling	Conservative	1867	2nd term	Commissioner of Agriculture and Public Works in Sandfield Macdonald ministry until December 20, 1871; resigned provincial seat July 23, 1872 to keep a seat in the federal parliament
London	William Ralph Meredith (1872)	Conservative	1872	1st term	elected September 4, 1872
Middlesex East	Richard Tooley	Conservative	1871	1st term	
Middlesex North	James Sinclair Smith	Liberal	1867	2nd term	
Middlesex West	Alexander Mackenzie	Liberal	1871	1st term	Treasurer in Blake ministry from 20 December 1871 to October 25, 1872; resigned provincial seat September 12, 1872 to keep a seat in the federal parliament
Middlesex West	John Watterworth (1872)	Liberal	1872	1st term	elected September 17, 1872
Monck	Lachlin McCallum	Conservative	1871	1st term	resigned August 2, 1872 to keep a seat in the federal parliament
Monck	Henry Ryan Haney (1872)	Liberal	1872	1st term	elected September 17, 1872
Niagara	Stephen Richards	Conservative	1867	2nd term	Commissioner of Crown Lands in Sandfield Macdonald ministry until December 20, 1871
Norfolk North	John Fitzgerald Clarke	Liberal	1871	1st term	
Norfolk South	Simpson McCall	Liberal	1867	2nd term	
Northumberland East	William Wilson Webb	Liberal	1871	1st term	
Northumberland West	Alexander Fraser	Liberal	1867	2nd term	
Northumberland West	Charles Gifford (1872)	Conservative	1872	1st term	
Ontario North	Thomas Paxton	Liberal	1867	2nd term	
Ontario South	Abram Farewell	Liberal	1871	1st term	
Ottawa	Richard William Scott	Liberal	1867	2nd term	Speaker until December 21, 1871; Commissioner of Crown Lands in Blake ministry after December 20, 1871, and in Mowat ministry after October 25, 1872; resigned December 4, 1873 to accept federal cabinet post in Mackenzie ministry
Ottawa	Daniel John O'Donoghue (1874)	Liberal	1874	1st term	
Oxford North	George Perry	Liberal	1867	2nd term	resigned October 31, 1872 to allow Oliver Mowat a seat in the legislature
Oxford North	Oliver Mowat (1872)	Liberal	1872	1st term	Premier and Attorney General in Mowat ministry after October 25, 1872; elected November 29, 1872
Oxford South	Adam Oliver	Liberal	1867	2nd term	
Peel	John Coyne	Conservative	1867	2nd term	died November 16, 1873
Peel	Kenneth Chisholm (1873)	Liberal	1873	1st term	elected December 29, 1873
Perth North	Andrew Monteith	Conservative	1867	2nd term	resigned from provincial parliament January 19, 1874 after he was elected to the federal parliament
Perth North	Thomas Mayne Daly (1874)	Conservative	1874	1st term	
Perth South	Thomas B. Guest	Conservative	1871	1st term	
Peterborough; East	George Read	Conservative	1867	2nd term	
Peterborough; West	Thomas McCulloch Fairbairn	Liberal	1871	1st term	died May 13, 1874
Peterborough; West	William Hepburn Scott (1874)	Conservative	1874	1st term	elected July 30, 1874
Prescott	George Wellesley Hamilton	Conservative	1871	1st term	
Prince Edward	Gideon Striker	Liberal	1871	1st term	Election voided by court on September 27, 1871; seat formally vacated December 8, 1871
Prince Edward	James Simeon McCuaig (1871)	Conservative	1871	1st term	Won byelection held on December 22 & 29, 1871 by a margin of 16 votes and took seat in early 1872, but a count found 35 voters for McCuaig was cast by persons not eligible to vote, and unseated McCuaig and returned Striker accordingly; McCuaig opted to contest that year's dominion election subsequently.
Prince Edward	Gideon Striker (1872)	Liberal	1871	1st term	Was returned by court in August 1872, and took his seat on January 8, 1873
Renfrew North	Thomas Deacon	Conservative	1871	1st term	
Renfrew South	Eric Harrington	Conservative	1871	1st term	
Russell	William Craig	Conservative	1867	2nd term	
Simcoe North	William Davis Ardagh	Conservative	1871	1st term	
Simcoe South	Thomas Roberts Ferguson	Conservative	1867	2nd term	resigned January 18, 1874 due to health problems
Simcoe South	D'Arcy Edward Boulton (1873)	Conservative	1873	1st term	
Stormont	William Colquhoun	Conservative	1867	2nd term	Colquhoun's election was declared void September 12, 1871, resulting in a by-election
Stormont	James Bethune (1872)	Liberal	1872	1st term	elected January 3, 1872
Toronto East	Matthew Crooks Cameron	Conservative	1867	2nd term	Provincial Secretary and Registrar in Sandfield Macdonald ministry until December 20, 1871; Leader of the Opposition after December 20, 1871
Toronto West	Adam Crooks	Liberal	1871	1st term	
Victoria North	Duncan McRae	Conservative	1871	1st term	
Victoria South	Samuel Casey Wood	Liberal	1871	1st term	
Waterloo North	Moses Springer	Liberal	1867	2nd term	
Waterloo South	Isaac Clemens	Liberal	1867	2nd term	
Welland	James George Currie	Liberal	1871	1st term	Speaker from December 21, 1871, to his resignation on March 29, 1873.
Wellington Centre	Charles Clarke	Liberal	1871	1st term	
Wellington North	Robert McKim	Liberal	1867	2nd term	resigned January 19, 1874 to compete (unsuccessfully) in the 1874 federal election
Wellington North	John McGowan (1874)	Conservative	1874	1st term	
Wellington South	Peter Gow	Liberal	1867	2nd term	Provincial Secretary and Registrar in Blake ministry after December 20, 1871, and Mowat ministry after October 25, 1872
Wentworth North	Robert Christie	Liberal	1867	2nd term	
Wentworth South	William Sexton	Liberal	1867	2nd term	
York East	Hugh Powell Crosby	Liberal	1867	2nd term	
York North	Alfred Boultbee	Conservative	1871	1st term	
York West	Peter Patterson	Liberal	1871	1st term	
