= Alexander Morris (politician) =

Canadian politician (1826–1889)

The Honourable Alexander Morris PC QC
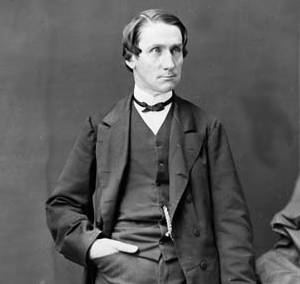
- Morris in 1869

2nd Lieutenant Governor of Manitoba
- In office December 2, 1872 – October 7, 1877
- Monarch: Victoria
- Governor General: The Earl of Dufferin
- Premier: Henry Joseph Clarke; Marc-Amable Girard; Robert Atkinson Davis
- Preceded by: Adams George Archibald
- Succeeded by: Joseph-Édouard Cauchon

2nd Lieutenant Governor of the North-West Territories
- In office December 2, 1872 – October 7, 1876
- Monarch: Victoria
- Governor General: The Earl of Dufferin
- Preceded by: Adams George Archibald
- Succeeded by: David Laird

Chief Justice of the Court of Queen's Bench of Manitoba
- In office July 2, 1872 – December 1872
- Preceded by: New office
- Succeeded by: Edmund Burke Wood

Minister of Inland Revenue
- In office November 16, 1869 – July 1, 1872
- Preceded by: Alexander Campbell
- Succeeded by: Charles Tupper

Personal details
- Born: March 17, 1826 Perth, Upper Canada
- Died: October 28, 1889 (aged 63) Toronto, Ontario, Canada
- Party: Conservative
- Other political affiliations: Conservative Party of Ontario
- Spouse: Margaret Cline (m. 1851)
- Children: 11
- Parent: William Morris
- Education: McGill University
- Occupation: Lawyer, judge, businessperson, public servant

Alexander Morris PC QC (March 17, 1826 – October 28, 1889) was a Canadian politician. He served in the cabinet of Prime Minister John A. Macdonald (1869–1872), and was the second Lieutenant Governor of Manitoba (1872–1877). He also served as the founder and first Lieutenant Governor of the District of Keewatin.

== Biography ==
Morris was born in Perth, Upper Canada (now Ontario), the son of William Morris, himself a prominent Canadian businessman and Conservative politician. From this privileged social position, Morris was educated in Canada and Scotland and worked for three years at the Montreal firm of Thorne and Heward. In 1847, he moved to Kingston, Ontario, and articled for a year under John A. Macdonald. In 1849, he became the first person to receive an arts degree from McGill University. He would subsequently receive other degrees from McGill, including a DCL in 1862. In 1851, he was admitted to the bar in both Canada East and Canada West; he subsequently built up a profitable legal practice.

Morris was also an author, and in 1855 published an essay entitled Canada and her resources, which called for the development of national industry. In 1858, he predicted a coming federation of the British North American colonies in a work entitled Nova Britannia, which sold 3,000 copies in its first ten days of publication. He also wrote on academic matters and developments in the Presbyterian church in Canada, of which he was a prominent member (becoming a ruling elder of its synod in the 1850s). Morris also wrote The Treaties of Canada With The Indians of Manitoba and The North-West Territories Including The Negotiations on Which They Were Based, and Other Information Relating Thereto in 1880, which is generally considered "the primary source document for government's interpretation of the treaty era in Canada."

Alexander Morris was raised for public life, and it was no surprise when he declared himself a candidate for the Province of Canada's legislature in 1861. He ran as a Liberal-Conservative in the riding of Lanark South in Canada West, supporting the government of George-Étienne Cartier and John A. Macdonald. Morris received 1265 votes, against 828 for his opponent. The Cartier-Macdonald government came out of the 1861 election in a weakened position, and Liberal John Sandfield Macdonald was able to form a ministry in 1862. Morris, accordingly, went into the opposition. He was easily re-elected in 1863, and returned to the government side when the Étienne-Paschal Taché-John A. Macdonald ministry was formed in 1864.

Morris's role in parliament was limited during these years, though he spoke frequently in support of confederation and played a role in negotiating the grand coalition ministry of 1864. He also expanded his business interests in this period, and was named to the board of the Commercial Bank of Canada in 1867. During his time in parliament, he was responsible for introducing a bill ending public executions in Canada. He also introduced a bill to encourage the future formation of free libraries.

Morris was re-elected by acclamation in the federal election of 1867, the first to be held following the royal proclamation of Confederation. He was appointed Minister of Inland Revenue on November 16, 1869, and served as a competent if not prominent member of the Macdonald ministry for the next three years. On the advice of his doctors, he did not seek re-election in 1872.

He was instead appointed as the first Chief Justice of the Court of Queen's Bench of Manitoba, serving in this position from July to December 1872. He was also appointed as the acting Lieutenant Governor of Manitoba and the Northwest Territories in October 1872, following the departure of Adams George Archibald. Morris maintained Archibald's policy of conciliation among the various factions in Manitoba, and unsuccessfully attempted to establish a local police force to preserve law and order in the region. He was formally sworn in as the official Lieutenant Governor on December 2, and attempted to accelerate the settling of Métis land claims in the province.

Manitoba's government was still in a developing state when Morris became Lieutenant Governor, and he continued Archibald's practice of serving as the province's de facto Premier. In 1873, he refused a request by Henry Joseph Clarke to be recognized as Premier of the province, and continued to exercise his own authority over the province's legislative process.

After the defeat of the provincial ministry in July 1874, Morris asked Marc-Amable Girard to become the province's first Premier, thereby instituting responsible government to the province. Even after this, he continued to exert considerable authority from behind the scenes.

Morris spoke for Manitoba on matters of federal–provincial relations, and helped to create the University of Manitoba in 1877. He was also actively involved in treaty negotiations with aboriginal groups, signing Treaties 3, 4, 5, and 6, and revising Treaties 1 and 2. Morris seems to have been more willing to support aboriginal land title than was his predecessor Archibald, and argued in favour of education and hunting/fishing rights for aboriginal groups. Despite some successes, however, he was unable to prevent the withdrawal of many Métis from the province (there were some suspicions about Morris's own speculation in land previously owned by the Métis).

In 1874, with Manitoba's finances in peril, the provincial government appealed to Ottawa for assistance. Ottawa agreed to provide aid, but demanded that the Legislative Council be eliminated in order to cut expenses. When the council twice rejected bills that would have resulted in its demise, Morris intervened by offering recalcitrant councillors lucrative government positions elsewhere. Due to Morris' mediation, Manitoba's Legislative Council became the first provincial upper house to be abolished in 1876.

Morris stepped down as Lieutenant Governor of the Northwest Territories in 1876, after it was made a separate jurisdiction. While losing this position, he also gained the Lieutenant Governorship of Keewatin District, a new territory which stretched up into the Arctic. He held this position until 1877, when he resigned as Lieutenant Governor of Manitoba and returned to Ontario.

Morris sought to return to the federal House of Commons in 1878. After losing the Conservative nomination in the Manitoba riding of Marquette, he decided to contest nearby Selkirk instead. He was defeated by Canadian Pacific Railway spokesman and Independent Conservative Donald A. Smith by 555 votes to 546, and subsequently returned to Ontario again.

Later in 1878, Ontario MLA Matthew Crooks Cameron was appointed as a judge, and the provincial seat of Toronto East became vacant. Morris contested the riding as a Conservative, and defeated his Liberal opponent J. Leys by 1891 votes to 1846. The Conservatives were in opposition to the Liberal government of Oliver Mowat in this period, and Morris served as the opposition house leader. In the general election of 1879, he personally defeated Mowat in Toronto East by 2132 votes to 2075 (though Mowat also contested Oxford North, which he won easily). Morris again defeated Leys by a narrow margin in 1883, but did not seek re-election in 1886, once more for medical reasons. The Conservatives were never able to form government in Ontario during Morris's time in the provincial house.

Morris continued to serve as a prominent figure in the Presbyterian Church in Canada following his retirement. He died in 1889, at age 63.

Parliament of Canada
New constituency	Member of Parliament for Lanark South; 1867–1872	Succeeded by John Graham Haggart
Legislative Assembly of Ontario
Preceded by Matthew Crooks Cameron	Member of the Legislative Assembly of Ontario for Toronto East; 1878–1886	Constituency abolished
Political offices
Preceded by Alexander Campbell	Minister of Inland Revenue; 1869–1872	Succeeded by Charles Tupper
Government offices
Preceded by Adams George Archibald	Lieutenant Governor of the North-West Territories; 1872–1876	Succeeded by David Laird
Preceded by Adams George Archibald	Lieutenant Governor of Manitoba; 1872–1877	Succeeded by Joseph-Édouard Cauchon
Legal offices
New office	Chief Justice of the Court of Queen's Bench of Manitoba; 1872	Succeeded by Edmund Burke Wood
