= Toronto East (provincial electoral district) =

Ontario electoral district
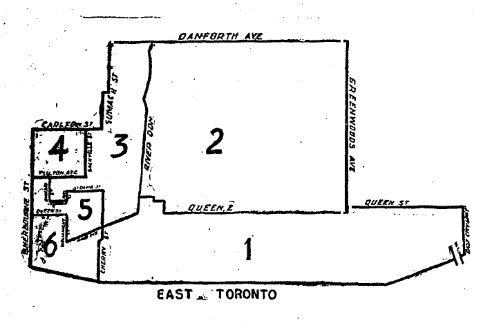
- Toronto East riding, created in 1894

Defunct provincial electoral district
- Legislature: Legislative Assembly of Ontario
- District created: 1867
- District abolished: 1914
- First contested: 1867
- Last contested: 1911

Toronto East, originally created as the East riding of Toronto, was one of the two electoral districts of Toronto, Ontario upon Canadian Confederation. The district was represented in the final two parliaments of the Legislative Assembly of the Province of Canada prior to confederation, and was represented in both the Parliament of Canada and the Legislative Assembly of Ontario upon confederation.

As an Ontario provincial electoral district, East Toronto was one of Toronto's two electoral districts in the first to fifth Ontario parliaments between 1867 and 1886, and one of Toronto's four electoral districts represented in the eighth to thirteenth Ontario parliaments between 1894 and 1914. It returned two members to the twelfth and thirteenth parliaments.

== Boundaries evolution ==
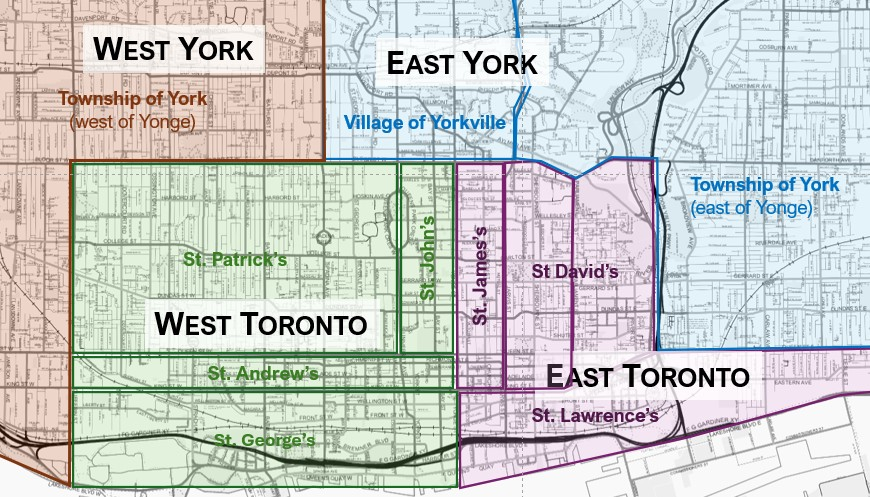
1860–1886

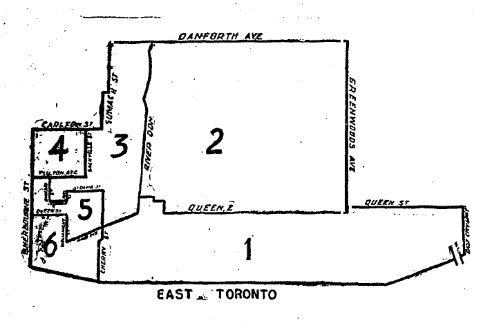
1894–1914

The two original Toronto electoral districts, West Toronto and East Toronto, were initially created in 1860 by dividing the city east–west along Yonge Street. They were contested in the final two elections of the United Province of Canada in 1861 and 1863. Toronto East consisted of the city wards of St. David, St. James, St. Lawrence. The city extended only as far north as Bloor Street at the time.

Upon Canadian confederation in 1867, the British North America Act preserved approximately forty electoral districts in Ontario while another forty were redrawn or created. The two Toronto districts were among those preserved, and were each given a federal seat and a provincial seat with identical boundaries as before. They were contested in the first federal election in 1867 that was held concurrently with the first Ontario provincial election.

While Toronto elected a third MPs by the second federal election held in 1872, its provincial representation did not increase until the sixth Ontario election in 1886. Toronto was a Conservative bastion in the first century following confederation. Instead of creating a new seat for the opposition, in 1886 the governing Liberals merged the two Toronto electoral districts into a single electoral district covering the entire city, including the recently annexed village of Yorkville. The enlarged electoral district of Toronto returned three members to the sixth and seventh Ontario legislative assembly with a limited voting system, where voters may vote for two of the candidates.

In 1894, the city was distributed to four electoral districts. By that time Toronto had further annexed a number of communities, including Riverdale in the east side of the city. Accordingly, the 1894 incarnation of Toronto East covered territory that were further east from the city core, consisting of the municipal ward No. 1 (Riverdale) and that part of ward No. 2 (Cabbagetown & Rosedale) lying south Carlton street and east of Sherbourne street, and also the Toronto Island. The western boundary consisted of Sherbourne Street north to Carlton Street, east along Carlton to Sumach Street and north along Sumach to the Danforth. Its eastern border consisted of Coxwell Avenue north to Queen Street East, west along Queen to Greenwoods Avenue (now Greenwood Avenue) and north along Greenwoods to the Danforth. It elected one MPP at first. The city was rewarded when the conservatives finally ended the over three decades of Liberal rule in 1905. The city's representation at Queen's Park doubled from four to eight in the 1908 election. Instead of creating new districts, for the five elections between 1908 and 1923, Toronto voters cast two votes in two concurrent contests.

In 1914 the districts of Toronto East, Toronto North, Toronto South and Toronto West were replaced by Toronto Northeast, Toronto Northwest, Toronto Southwest and Toronto Southeast, and they continued to be dual-member districts. Toronto East was distributed mostly to Toronto Southeast and Riverdale, a newly established single-member electoral district, with smaller portions to Toronto Northeast.

== Electoral history ==
The provincial seat of East Toronto was the battleground for some of the highest profile contests in its first incarnation covering half of the city. In both incarnations it was held by some of the most prominent figures of the Conservative Party.

When the seat was first contested in 1860, John Willoughby Crawford, a prominent businessman from a prominent Tory family, dealt a stunning upset to George Brown, an incumbent member of the predecessor Toronto electoral division and leader of the Reform Party. Following Crawford's own defeat in 1863, he represented Leeds South and Toronto West in the House of Commons before being appointed Lieutenant Governor of Ontario in 1873.

After Confederation, the seat was held by Matthew Crook Cameron, Ontario's inaugural Provincial Secretary and Registrar, and the principal lieutenant to Premier John Sandfield Macdonald in the ministry known as Patent Combination. In 1871, he fended of a challenge by Francis Henry Madcalf, a three-time popularly elected Mayor of Toronto. Following Sandfield Macdonald ministry's ouster, Cameron became opposition leader and in 1875 defeated Adam Crook, the Attorney General in the successor Liberal government who left his own Toronto West seat to contest Cameron.

Alexander Morris, who served as a cabinet minister in Sir John A Macdonald's first ministry and as Lieutenant Governor of Manitoba, succeeded Cameron in 1878 as MPP for Toronto East and served as opposition house leader. In the 1879 election, he faced a challenge by incumbent Premier Oliver Mowat, who personally contested Morris in Toronto East while simultaneously seeking re-election in Oxford North. Mowat increased his government's majority that year winning 57 seats province wide, but it was Morris who prevailed in Toronto East, by a margin of 57 votes.

By the turn of the 20th century, Toronto had become an electoral bastion for the Conservative Party. Toronto East in its later incarnation in early twentieth century routinely returned Conservative MPPs with landslide margins. In the first election after its reinstitution in 1894, George Ryerson, nephew of the educational administrator Egerton Ryerson, beat his Liberal opponent by close to 5-to-1 margin. It was for a long time held by Robert Pyne, education minister in the Whitney and Hearst ministries, whose thirteen years tenure heading the ministry was second in length only to Liberal Premier George Ross.

== Members of Provincial Parliament ==
East Toronto was represented in the final two parliaments of the Legislative Assembly of the Province of Canada. Upon confederation, the electoral division was represented by a member of the dominion (federal) parliament in addition to the following members of provincial parliament.

Assembly	Years	Member	Party
Legislative Assembly of the Province of Canada; Created from the electoral division of Toronto; East Toronto
7th	1861–1863	John Willoughby Crawford	Conservative
8th	1863–1867	Alexander Mortimer Smith	Reformer
Legislative Assembly of Ontario; Continued as an existing electoral division from Province of Canada; East Toronto
1st	1867–1871	Matthew Cameron (Note: Resigned in 1878 to accept appointment as a judge.)	Conservative
2nd	1871–1875	Matthew Cameron	Conservative
3rd	1875–1878	Matthew Cameron	Conservative
3rd	1878–1878	Alexander Morris	Conservative
4th	1879–1883	Alexander Morris	Conservative
5th	1883–1886	Alexander Morris	Conservative
Merged with Toronto West to form Toronto
Re-constituted upon Toronto being divided to four electoral districts Toronto East
8th	1894–1898	George Ryerson	Conservative
9th	1898–1902	Robert Pyne (Note: On 21 February 1905, Pyne resigned in order to recontest the seat due to his appointment as Minister of Education. This was known as a ministerial by-election.)	Conservative
10th	1902–1904	Robert Pyne	Conservative
11th	1904–1908	Robert Pyne	Conservative
12th	1908–1911	Seat A: Robert Pyne; Seat B: Thomas Richard Whitesides	Conservative
13th	1911–1914	Seat A: Robert Pyne; Seat B: Thomas Richard Whitesides	Conservative
Dissolved and distributed to Riverdale, Toronto Southeast and Toronto Northeast

Sourced from the Ontario Legislative Assembly

== Election results ==
=== 1867–1886 ===
1867 Ontario general election
Party	Candidate	Votes	%
Conservative	Matthew Crooks Cameron	1,178	56.28
Liberal	Mr. Stock	914	43.67
Independent	R.M. Allen	1	0.05
Total valid votes		2,093	49.80
Eligible voters		4,203	
Conservative pickup new district.			
Source: Elections Ontario

1871 Ontario general election
Party	Candidate	Votes	%	±%
Conservative	Matthew Crooks Cameron	1,232	52.56	−3.72
Liberal	Francis Henry Medcalf	1,112	47.44	+3.77
Turnout		2,344	52.26	+2.46
Eligible voters		4,485		
Conservative hold		Swing		−3.75
Source: Elections Ontario

1875 Ontario general election
Party	Candidate	Votes	%	±%
Conservative	Matthew Crooks Cameron	1,849	53.83	+1.27
Liberal	Adam Crooks	1,579	45.97	−1.47
Independent	R.M. Allen	7	0.20	
Total valid votes		3,435	54.42	+2.16
Eligible voters		6,312		
Conservative hold		Swing		+1.37
Source: Elections Ontario

Ontario provincial by-election, December 1878 Resignation of Matthew Crooks Cameron
Party	Candidate	Votes	%	±%
Conservative	Alexander Morris	1,891	50.60	−3.23
Liberal	J. Leys	1,846	49.40	+3.43
Total valid votes		3,737		
Conservative hold		Swing		−3.33
Source: History of the Electoral Districts, Legislatures and Ministries of the Province of Ontario

1879 Ontario general election
Party	Candidate	Votes	%	±%
Conservative	Alexander Morris	2,132	50.68	+0.08
Liberal	D. Mowat	2,075	49.32	−0.08
Total valid votes		4,207	51.12	
Eligible voters		8,230		
Conservative hold		Swing		+0.08
Source: Elections Ontario

=== 1894–1914 ===
1894 Ontario general election
Party	Candidate	Votes	Vote %
Conservative	George Ryerson	8,224	82.7
Liberal	Mr.Armstrong	1,719	17.3
	Total	9,943	

1898 Ontario general election
Party	Candidate	Votes	Vote %
Conservative	Robert Pyne	3,097	67.6
Liberal	Mr. Caldwell	1,487	32.4
	Total	4,584	

1902 Ontario general election
Party	Candidate	Votes	Vote %
Conservative	Robert Pyne	3,136	51.9
Liberal	L.V. McBrady	2,214	37.0
Socialist	J. Simpson	375	9.5
Socialist-Labour	C.A. Kemp	75	1.5
	Total	5,970	

1905 Ontario general election
Party	Candidate	Votes	Vote %
Conservative	Robert Pyne	3,567	72.1
Liberal	W.L. Edmonds	1,198	24.2
Socialist	W.G. Gribble	184	3.7
	Total	4,949	

==== Seat A ====
1908 Ontario general election
Party	Candidate	Votes	Vote %
Conservative	Robert Pyne	4,730	77.7
Labour	Mr. Bruce	1,013	16.6
Socialist	W.G. Gribble	344	5.7
	Total	6,087	

1911 Ontario general election
Party	Candidate	Votes	Vote %
Conservative	Robert Pyne	3,428	78.7
Labour	D. Bullock	927	21.3
	Total	4,355	

==== Seat B ====
1908 Ontario general election
Party	Candidate	Votes	Vote %
Conservative	Thomas Richard Whitesides	2,811	43.6
Independent Conservative	Joseph Russell	2,471	38.3
Liberal	Mr. Bryans	979	15.2
Socialist	Mr. Drury	190	2.9
	Total	6,451	

1911 Ontario general election
Party	Candidate	Votes	Vote %
Conservative	Thomas Richard Whitesides	2,788	63.8
Labour	J.B. Reid	1,076	24.6
Liberal	James Stevenson	509	11.6
	Total	4,373	
