= Blake ministry =

Cabinet of Ontario, 1871-1872

- 2nd ministry of Ontario

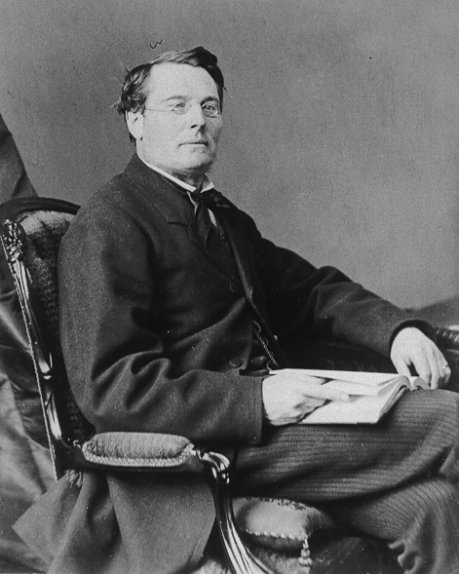
- Edward Blake, Second Premier of Ontario, 1871-1872
- Date formed: December 20, 1871
- Date dissolved: October 25, 1872

People and organisations
- Monarch: Victoria
- Lieutenant Governor: William Pearce Howland
- Premier: Edward Blake
- Member party: Liberal Party
- Status in legislature: Majority
- Opposition party: Conservative
- Opposition leader: Matthew Crooks Cameron

History
- Incoming formation: resignation of Sandfield Macdonald
- Outgoing formation: resignation of Edward Blake
- Election: 1871
- Legislature term: 2nd Parliament of Ontario
- Predecessor: Macdonald ministry
- Successor: Mowat ministry

The Blake ministry was the combined cabinet (formally the Executive Council of Ontario) that governed Ontario from December 20, 1871, to October 25, 1872. It was led by the 2nd Premier of Ontario, Edward Blake. The ministry was made up of members of the Liberal Party of Ontario, which commanded a majority of the seats in the Legislative Assembly of Ontario.

The ministry replaced the Sandfield Macdonald ministry following the resignation of Premier John Sandfield Macdonald, who departed after his "Patent Combination" ministry lost a vote of confidence in the Legislative Assembly of Ontario. The Blake ministry served for less than a year during the 2nd Parliament of Ontario.

Blake resigned in 1872 to pursue a career in federal politics. He was succeeded as Premier of Ontario by Oliver Mowat.

== History ==
The second Cabinet for Ontario, Canada consisted of Premier Edward Blake four other Cabinet ministers.

The second ministry succeeded the Patent Combination Ministry of John Sandfield Macdonald when it fell December 20, 1871. It would survive less than a year, ending October 25, 1872, when Blake and his Treasurer Alexander Mackenzie chose to serve in the federal parliament and resigned their provincial seats when the practice of serving in both parliaments was banned by the Ontario legislature.

Blake, Gow, Mackenzie, and McKellar represented Western Ontario ridings, while Scott represented an Eastern Ontario constituency.

Scott and McKellar would continue to serve in their incumbencies, as Commissioner of Crown Lands and Commissioner of Agriculture and Public Works respectively, in the Mowat ministry; Gow would be dismissed from cabinet by Mowat. When Mackenzie became the Prime Minister of Canada in 1873, Scott would move on to serve in his federal ministry.

Members of the Executive Council
Position	Minister	Term start	Term end
Premier	Edward Blake	December 20, 1871	October 25, 1872
Attorney General of Ontario	Adam Crooks	December 20, 1871	October 25, 1872
Treasurer	Alexander Mackenzie	December 20, 1871	October 25, 1872
Commissioner of Crown Lands	Richard Scott	December 21, 1871	October 25, 1872
Provincial Secretary and Registrar	Alexander Mackenzie	December 20, 1871	December 21, 1871
Provincial Secretary and Registrar	Peter Gow	December 21, 1871	October 25, 1872
Commissioner of Agriculture and Public Works	Archibald McKellar	December 20, 1871	October 25, 1872
