= John Sandfield Macdonald ministry =

Macdonald ministry
- 1st ministry of Ontario

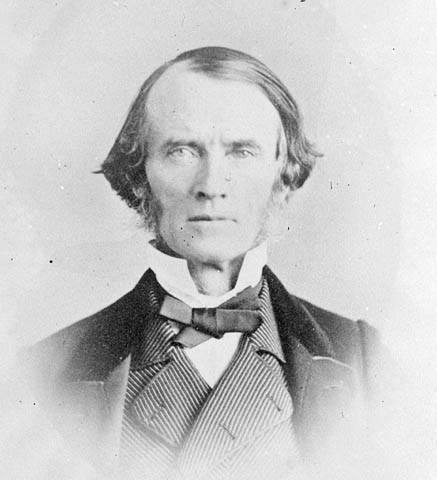
- John Sandfield Macdonald, First Premier of Ontario, 1867-1871
- Date established: July 16, 1867
- Date dissolved: December 20, 1871

Leadership and composition
- Monarch: Victoria
- Lieutenant Governor: Henry William Stisted (1867-1868); William Pearce Howland (1868-1871)
- Premier: John Sandfield Macdonald
- Member party: Conservative; Liberal
- Status in legislature: Majority (coalition)
- Opposition leader: Archibald McKellar (1867-1869); Edward Blake (1869-1871)

Formation and history
- Incoming formation: Confederation
- Elections: 1867, 1871
- Legislature term: 1st Parliament of Ontario 2nd Parliament of Ontario
- Outgoing formation: resignation of Macdonald
- Predecessor: Union of Canada
- Successor: Blake ministry

The Sandfield Macdonald ministry was the inaugural cabinet of the government of Ontario (formally the Executive Council of Ontario), a province in Canada. It was formed shortly after Canadian Confederation on July 16, 1867, and governed until it was ousted December 19, 1871. It was headed by the province’s first Premier John Sandfield Macdonald, who labelled his administration the “Patent Combination” to booster its claim as a coalition government made up of both conservatives and reformers (a common alternative label for liberals until mid twentieth century).

The government was formed provisionally before the first election was held. Its governing mandate was confirmed following the 1867 Ontario election, which took place over weeks in August and September. While partisan affiliations in the first few years of confederation were fluid and unstructured, it was generally acknowledged that the Sandfield Macdonald ministry commanded the support of around 50 of the 82 elected members during the first Ontario Parliament.

The election held in March 1871 however weakened the ministry’s standing substantially. With parliamentary confidence for the ministry in doubt, Sandfield Macdonald resisted calling the 2nd Parliament of Ontario in session for eight months. When parliament was finally convened in December that year, Sandfield Macdonald ignored three votes of non-confidence in his refusal to relinquish office. The Patent Combination finally came undone on December 19, 1871, after its Treasurer Edmund Burke Wood announced his resignation and voted with the opposition. It was succeeded by a Liberal ministry led by Edward Blake.

== Context ==
The ministry consisted of five members.

Minister	Tenure (start/end)		Seat in legisture
John Sandfield Macdonald	July 16, 1867	December 20, 1871	Cornwall
John Carling	July 16, 1867	December 20, 1871	London
Stephen Richards	July 16, 1867	December 20, 1871	Niagara
Matthew Crooks Cameron	July 20, 1867	December 20, 1871	Toronto East
Edmund Burke Wood	July 20, 1867	December 15, 1871	Brant South

While much effort was made to present the ministry led by Sandfield Macdonald as a Liberal-Conservatives coalition, it operated not in corporation with but in direct competition against the Liberal at the time. Sandfield Macdonald, Richards and Wood were bona fide members of the Liberal Party (interchangeably called the "Reform Party" in those days) prior to confederation. However, their presences in this new ministry were not viewed by Liberal partisans as participation in power sharing the way like George Brown or Oliver Mowat were in the Great Coalition of 1864, but were derided as traitorous.

The caucus that sustained the ministry was dominated by conservatives loyal to prime minister John A Macdonald, the mastermind who maneuvered Sandfield Macdonald, a formal rival for the pre-confederation premier’s chair, into the new one for Ontario. Even though Sandfield Macdonald held the distinction as the provincial inaugural Premier and Attorney General, he was no rookies for those roles. He held these same roles while leading a Liberal ministry in the United Province of Canada between 1862 and 1864, the only extended interruption of Conservative John A Macdonald’s premiership from 1856 to confederation in 1867. A cursory discussion of that context is needed for proper appreciation of this ministry’s formation.

=== Erstwhile rivals in the politics of the Province of Canada ===
The outcome of the first Ontario election tells the story of the political mastery of one John Macdonald and the expediency of another, two erstwhile rivals both from eastern Ontario though with no familial relationship. While the more radical George Brown was the most prominent Liberal (or Reformer, as those in opposition to the Tories were known then) among the fathers of confederation and the principal rival to Canada's founding prime minister John A Macdonald, it was John Sandfield Macdonald leading a Liberal ministry who replaced John A when his Tories ministry was ousted between 1862 and 1864. With the exception of a two-day ministry led by Brown, one of two Macdonalds occupied the English co-premiership in the final decade of the United Province of Canada.

The politics of that final decade was however plagued by division along not just partisan but also religious and language lines. Governments were propped up by disgruntled opposition members with transitory loyalty and therefore were routinely on the verge of collapsing. When the united province's final Liberal ministry (or Reform ministry, the two terms being used interchangeably at the time) led by John Sandfield Macdonald collapsed in May 1864, it was the fourth government to fail in six years. Coming to terms with the unviability of the politics of the United Province, John A Macdonald's Tories (along their partner Parti bleu members in French Canada) and the Clear Grits wing of the Liberals led by George Brown entered into the Great Coalition with the goal of coming up with a sustainable arrangement of confederation. To secure Brown's buy-in, John A Macdonald gave three of the five seats designated for English speakers in his cabinet to the Liberals, a concession he refused to make in 1858 to secure Sandfield Macdonald's support. In opposition were a small faction English-speaking Liberals led by the sidelined Sandfield Macdonald and the Parti rouge from French Canada, opposing not just the government but the confederation project.

Once confederation arrangement were settled, Brown exited the coalition as planned. Recognizing the Conservatives’ extremely weak position in English Canada might prove his political undoing in the new dominion, John A set out to preserve the coalition under the Liberal-Conservative banner. Despite Sandfield Macdonald's vigorous opposition to confederation during earlier negotiations (he did not attend any of the three conferences leading to confederation and thus not among the 36 Fathers of Confederation) once it became inevitable, Sandfield Macdonald avenged his alienations from his Liberal peers by taking his small band of followers into the Liberal-Conservative coalition, and was sworn in on July 15, 1867 as the provisional premier of the newly created province. In the months that followed, the two Macdonalds went "hunting in pairs" and secured electoral mandates in their respective spheres in the concurrent elections.

== Formation ==
Within days of the founding of the new nation, the newly installed Lieutenant-Governor Major-General Henry Stisted requested Sandfield Macdonald to undertake the formation of the province’s provisional Government on July 11, 1867. Sandfield Macdonald was initially sworn in with John Carling, a conservative from London and a confidant of Sir John A, and Stephen Richards from Brockville, a member of a prominent Liberal family, as those were the only two members he was able to secure in the first week. The Globe, then a liberal newspaper, reported a long list of Liberals who have rejected Sandfield Macdonald entreat, noting the contrast to just a few years ago when he could pick from a large number of willing Liberals for his pre-confederation ministry and derided Sandfield Macdonald as “the greatest blunder committed by any Canadian politician." The paper also suggested that Richards has long been bought off by Sir John A with a patronage appointment as a crown prosecutor. In the following week he secured Matthew Crooks Cameron, a Conservative who served two terms pre-confederation as member for Ontario North, and Edmund Burke Wood, a nominal Liberal member of the pre-confederation legislature who as a prominent lawyer for railways companies was well known to be easily influenced with financial incentives. They were sworn in five days following the initial three.

While Sandfield MacDonald and Carling each secured dual-mandates, respectively in Cornwall and London, with comfortable margins, the other chosen ministers faced electoral headwind. The news of Woods being recruited to join the coalition arrived literally while the Brant South Liberal association was meeting, causing the meeting to disband in confusion. While the local Conservatives yielded to Wood, his faced competitive challenges from former friends, winning his MP and MPP seats each with less than 10% margin. Cameron was defeated in his bid to retain Ontario North as its new MP, but he was able to secure the provincial seat seat of Toronto East thanks to his previous service on city's council. In Leeds South, the local Conservative association refused to yield to Richards, the sole cabinet member who stood only for a provincial seat, while the local Liberals were less than enthused with his joining of the coalition, costing not only him his entry to the legislature, but also his younger brother's bid for the federal seat. Macdonald faced mounting calls to dismiss Richards for a number of months, in particular from Conservatives who wish to assume a majority in the cabinet, until Richards was able to secure the Niagara seat in a by-election later that year with the help of the local Conservative MP Angus Morrison.

== Operations ==
There was as yet no Minister of Education; the role was filled by Chief Superintendent Egerton Ryerson, who reported to Provincial Secretary Cameron.

The civil service remained very small throughout the Macdonald ministry. The offices of Treasury and of Attorney General each had fewer than ten employees; the largest department, Crown Lands, had fewer than 100 employees, including all land and timber field agents combined.

The budget increased from $1,184,000 in 1868 to $1,817,000 in 1871.

== Dissolution & aftermath ==
This ministry would survive the first parliament by several months, finally resigning 20 December 1871, as Macdonald could not command the confidence of a much more Liberal dominated 2nd Parliament of Ontario.

Macdonald himself did not longer survive his ministry, dying after a long illness on June 1, 1872.

Cameron would go on to serve as Leader of the Opposition to the Blake ministry and the first rival Oliver Mowat faced over his six consecutive majority wins.

Carling opted to give up his provincial seat when dual-mandate was outlawed in the 1872 federal election, and served for a long time as a senior cabinet minister and the political lieutenant to Sir John A. MacDonald in western Ontario.

Woods opted to give up his federal seat in 1872, but was soon disappointed that his return to the Liberal fold did not earn him a place in either Blake's or Mowat's cabinet, and resigned to run in a federal byelection. His deep background in railways companies made him a most potent artillery against Conservatives during the Pacific scandal, so he was again disappointed to not be invited by Liberal Prime Minister Alexander Mackenzie, who succeeded him briefly as Ontario Treasurer, to join his federal ministry, and accepted the appointment to be Chief Justice of the Supreme Court of Manitoba.

Richards, would soon retire, and his retirement might have rehabilitated his family members in Liberal circles. His younger brother Albert Norton Richards was able to get elected as the Liberal MP for Leeds South once he was no longer on the ballot. When the Liberals formed their first government at the federal level, his older brother William Buell Richards would be name the inaugural Chief Justice of Canada.

== List of ministers ==
=== Minister by Portfolio ===
Position	Minister	Term start	Term end
Premier & President of the Council (Note: Premier was an informal title for the person invited to form and then lead the government, and was used interchangeably with the title "Prime Minister of Ontario". President of the Council was a formal title/office but one without its own department until 1905. In contemporary formal documentation, Macdonald was referred as Attorney General, his ministerial office.)	John Sandfield Macdonald	July 16, 1867	December 20, 1871
Attorney General	John Sandfield Macdonald	July 16, 1867	December 20, 1871
Treasurer	Edmund Burke Wood	July 20, 1867	December 15, 1871
Provincial Secretary and Registrar	Matthew Crooks Cameron	July 20, 1867	July 25, 1871
Provincial Secretary and Registrar	Stephen Richards	July 25, 1871	December 20, 1871
Commissioner of Crown Lands	Stephen Richards	July 16, 1867	July 25, 1871
Commissioner of Crown Lands	Matthew Crooks Cameron	July 25, 1871	December 20, 1871
Commissioner of Agriculture and Public Works (Note: The Department of Agriculture and Public Works was a single department until 1868 when An Act respecting the Public Works of Ontario, 32 Victoria 1868-9, c. 28 created Public Work as a separate department. However, the office of Commissioner of Agriculture and Public Works remained a single office until 1874.)	John Carling	July 16, 1867	December 20, 1871

== Sources ==
- Hammond, Melvin Ormond (1917). Confederation and its leaders. New York: G. H. Doran company. ISBN 0749005351.
