= Thomas Richard Whitesides =

Canadian politician from Ontario

Member of the Ontario Provincial Parliament for Toronto East Seat B
- In office June 8, 1908 – May 29, 1914 Serving with Robert Allan Pyne
- Preceded by: seat created
- Succeeded by: seat abolished

Personal details
- Party: Conservative

Thomas Richard Whitesides was a Canadian politician from Ontario. He represented Toronto East in the Legislative Assembly of Ontario from 1908 to 1914.

== See also ==
- 12th Parliament of Ontario
- 13th Parliament of Ontario
