= William Lount =

Canadian politician

Member of Parliament for Toronto Centre
- In office 1896–1897
- Preceded by: George Cockburn
- Succeeded by: George Bertram

Ontario MPP
- In office 1867–1871
- Preceded by: Riding established
- Succeeded by: William Davis Ardagh
- Constituency: Simcoe North

Personal details
- Born: March 3, 1840 Holland Landing, Upper Canada
- Died: April 24, 1903 (aged 63) Toronto, Ontario, Canada
- Party: Liberal
- Spouse: Isabelle Hornibrook (m. 1893)
- Relations: Samuel Lount, Uncle
- Occupation: Lawyer

William Lount, KC (March 3, 1840 – April 24, 1903) was an Ontario lawyer and political figure. He represented Simcoe North in the 1st Parliament of Ontario and Toronto Centre in the House of Commons of Canada as a Liberal member from 1896 to 1897.

He was born in Holland Landing in Upper Canada in 1840, the son of George Lount. He was educated at the University of Toronto, studied law and was called to the bar in 1863. Lount practiced law in Barrie and, later, in Toronto. He was named Queen's Counsel in Ontario in 1876 and in the Dominion of Canada in 1881. He resigned his seat in the House of Commons in 1897. In 1901, he was named a justice in the Common Pleas division of the High Court of Ontario. He died in Toronto while still a judge at the age of 63.

He was married twice: to a Miss Orris in 1874 and to Isabelle Hornibrook in 1893.

His uncle, Samuel Lount, was executed for his part in the Upper Canada Rebellion.

== Electoral history ==
1867 Ontario general election: Simcoe North
Party	Candidate	Votes	%
Liberal	William Lount	1,431	52.40
Conservative	A. Morrison	1,300	47.60
Total valid votes		2,731	81.91
Eligible voters		3,334	
Liberal pickup new district.			
Source: Elections Ontario

1871 Ontario general election: Simcoe North
Party	Candidate	Votes	%
Conservative	William Davis Ardagh	1,354	44.39
Liberal	Charles Cook	1,041	34.13
Liberal	William Lount	655	21.48
Turnout		3,050	69.41
Eligible voters		4,394	
Election voided
Source: Elections Ontario
