= Simcoe North (provincial electoral district) =

Provincial electoral district in Ontario, Canada

Coordinates: 44.68°N 79.64°W

Ontario electoral district
- Simcoe North in relation to southern Ontario ridings

Provincial electoral district
- Legislature: Legislative Assembly of Ontario
MPP
Jill Dunlop
Progressive Conservative
- District created: 1996
- First contested: 1999
- Last contested: 2025

Demographics
- Population (2016): 111,335
- Electors (2018): 92,450
- Area (km²): 3,143
- Pop. density (per km²): 35.4
- Census division: Simcoe County
- Census subdivision(s): Midland, Orillia, Penetanguishene, Tay, Tiny, Christian Island, Severn, Ramara, Oro-Medonte, Mnjikaning First Nation

Simcoe North is a provincial electoral district in Ontario, Canada. It was established as a provincial riding in 1996. Its population was 111,335 in 2016.

== Demographics ==
According to the 2011 Canadian census for the overlapping Simcoe North (federal electoral district)

Ethnic groups: 88.5% White, 9.0% Aboriginal
Languages: 90.5% English, 3.8% French, 1.4% German
Religions: 71.7% Christian (28.5% Catholic, 13.0% United Church, 10.1% Anglican, 5.6% Presbyterian, 2.9% Baptist, 1.2% Lutheran, 1.0% Pentecostal, 9.4% other Christian), 26.9% None.
Median income: $28,718 (2010)
Average income: $37,989 (2010)

== Geography ==
The district includes all of the north and eastern parts of Simcoe County. The major municipalities include Midland, Orillia, Penetanguishene, Tay, Tiny, Christian Island, Severn, Ramara, Oro-Medonte, and Mnjikaning First Nation. The area is 3,143 km^{2}.

== Members of Provincial Parliament ==
Simcoe North
Assembly	Years	Member	Party
Riding created
1st	1867–1871	William Lount	Liberal
2nd	1871–1874	William Davis Ardagh	Conservative
Riding dissolved
Riding created from Simcoe East and Muskoka–Georgian Bay
37th	1999–2003	Garfield Dunlop	Progressive Conservative
38th	2003–2007	Garfield Dunlop	Progressive Conservative
39th	2007–2011	Garfield Dunlop	Progressive Conservative
40th	2011–2014	Garfield Dunlop	Progressive Conservative
41st	2014–2015	Garfield Dunlop	Progressive Conservative
41st	2015–2018	Patrick Brown	Progressive Conservative
41st	2018–2018	Patrick Brown	Independent
42nd	2018–2022	Jill Dunlop	Progressive Conservative
43rd	2022–present	Jill Dunlop	Progressive Conservative
Sourced from the Ontario Legislative Assembly

== Election results ==
=== 1999–present ===
Winning party in each polling division of Simcoe North at the 2025 Ontario general election

2025 Ontario general election
Party	Candidate	Votes	%	±%
Progressive Conservative	Jill Dunlop	24,849	51.38	+1.58
Liberal	Walter Alvarez-Bardales	13,328	27.56	+10.11
New Democratic	Jordi Malcolm	4,813	9.95	–7.79
Green	Chris Carr	3,214	6.65	–2.15
New Blue	Dave Brunelle	1,582	3.27	+0.16
Libertarian	William Joslin	579	1.20	+0.51
Total valid votes		48,365	99.21	
Total rejected, unmarked and declined ballots		387	0.79	+0.30
Turnout		48,752	46.11	–0.13
Eligible voters		105,720		
Progressive Conservative hold		Swing		–4.27
Source: Elections Ontario

Winning party in each polling division of Simcoe North at the 2022 Ontario general election

2022 Ontario general election
Party	Candidate	Votes	%	±%
Progressive Conservative	Jill Dunlop	23,041	49.80	+2.89
New Democratic	Elizabeth Van Houtte	8,208	17.74	–10.29
Liberal	Aaron Cayden Hiltz	8,070	17.44	–0.26
Green	Krystal Brooks	4,071	8.80	+2.05
New Blue	Mark Douris	1,438	3.11	–
Ontario Party	Aaron MacDonald	1,119	2.42	–
Libertarian	William Joslin	318	0.69	+0.09
Total valid votes		46,265	99.51	
Total rejected, unmarked and declined ballots		228	0.49	–0.70
Turnout		46,493	46.24	–12.64
Eligible voters		100,537		
Progressive Conservative hold		Swing		+6.59
Source: Elections Ontario

2018 Ontario general election
Party	Candidate	Votes	%	±%
Progressive Conservative	Jill Dunlop	25,236	46.92	–6.76
New Democratic	Elizabeth Van Houtte	15,078	28.03	+11.14
Liberal	Gerry Marshall	9,523	17.70	–5.91
Green	Valerie Powell	3,632	6.75	+2.20
Libertarian	Cynthia Sneath	320	0.59	+0.33
Total valid votes		53,789	98.81	
Total rejected, unmarked and declined ballots		646	1.19	+0.76
Turnout		54,435	58.88	+18.21
Eligible voters		92,450		
Progressive Conservative gain from Independent		Swing		–8.95
Source: Elections Ontario

Ontario provincial by-election, September 3, 2015 Resignation of Garfield Dunlop
Party	Candidate	Votes	%	±%	Expenditures
Progressive Conservative	Patrick Brown	21,095	53.68	+9.71	$117,157.00
Liberal	Fred Larsen	9,281	23.62	–8.92	$94,892.00
New Democratic	Elizabeth Van Houtte	6,637	16.89	+1.34	$54,795.23
Green	Valerie Powell	1,791	4.56	–3.40	$183.33
New Reform	James Gault	200	0.51	–	–
People's Political Party	Kevin Clarke	146	0.37	–	–
Libertarian	Darren Roskam	104	0.26	–	–
Pauper	John Turmel	47	0.12	–	–
Total valid votes		39,301	99.57		
Total rejected, unmarked and declined ballots		170	0.43	–1.02	
Turnout		39,471	40.67	–12.65	
Eligible voters		97,048			
Progressive Conservative hold		Swing		+9.32	
Source: Elections Ontario

2014 Ontario general election
Party	Candidate	Votes	%	±%
Progressive Conservative	Garfield Dunlop	22,179	43.96	–11.20
Liberal	Fred Larsen	16,413	32.53	+10.12
New Democratic	Doris Middleton	7,846	15.55	–1.40
Green	Peter Stubbins	4,013	7.95	+2.48
Total valid votes		50,451	98.55	
Total rejected, unmarked and declined ballots		741	1.45	+1.14
Turnout		51,192	53.33	+2.35
Eligible voters		95,998		
Progressive Conservative hold		Swing		–10.66
Source: Elections Ontario

2011 Ontario general election
Party	Candidate	Votes	%	±%
Progressive Conservative	Garfield Dunlop	25,081	55.16	+5.34
Liberal	Fred Larsen	10,191	22.41	–8.13
New Democratic	Doris Middleton	7,710	16.96	+7.77
Green	Peter Stubbins	2,488	5.47	–4.73
Total valid votes		45,470	99.69	
Total rejected, unmarked and declined ballots		142	0.31	–0.18
Turnout		45,612	50.98	–3.08
Eligible voters		89,474		
Progressive Conservative hold		Swing		+6.74
Source: Elections Ontario

2007 Ontario general election
Party	Candidate	Votes	%	±%
Progressive Conservative	Garfield Dunlop	22,986	49.82	+3.69
Liberal	Laura Domsy	14,094	30.55	–8.32
Green	Wayne Varcoe	4,709	10.21	+7.17
New Democratic	Andrew Hill	4,240	9.19	–1.69
Libertarian	Dane-Train Raybould	112	0.24	–
Total valid votes		46,141	99.51	
Total rejected, unmarked and declined ballots		227	0.49	–0.01
Turnout		46,368	54.06	–6.79
Eligible voters		85,770		
Progressive Conservative hold		Swing		+6.01
Source: Elections Ontario

2003 Ontario general election
Party	Candidate	Votes	%	±%
Progressive Conservative	Garfield Dunlop	23,393	46.13	–7.02
Liberal	Paul Sloan	19,713	38.87	–0.16
New Democratic	John Niddery	5,515	10.87	+4.96
Green	Nina Pruesse	1,540	3.04	+1.75
Family Coalition	Blaine Scott	453	0.89	–
Independent	Karnail Singh	101	0.20	–
Total valid votes		50,715	99.50	
Total rejected, unmarked and declined ballots		253	0.50	–0.36
Turnout		50,968	60.85	+0.97
Eligible voters		83,757		
Progressive Conservative hold		Swing		–3.43
Source: Elections Ontario

1999 Ontario general election
Party	Candidate	Votes	%
Progressive Conservative	Garfield Dunlop	26,160	53.15
Liberal	George J. Macdonald	19,209	39.03
New Democratic	Ann Billings	2,913	5.92
Green	Harry Promm	633	1.29
Natural Law	William Robert Ayling	305	0.62
Total valid votes		49,220	99.14
Total rejected, unmarked and declined ballots		425	0.86
Turnout		49,645	59.88
Eligible voters		82,904	
Progressive Conservative pickup new district.			
Source: Elections Ontario

=== 1867–1874 ===
Ontario provincial by-election, January 1872 Previous election voided
Party	Candidate	Votes	%	±%
Conservative	William Davis Ardagh	1,847	68.08	+20.48
Independent	Mr. Ramsey	866	31.92	
Total valid votes		2,713	100.0	−0.66
Conservative gain from Liberal		Swing		+20.48
Source: History of the Electoral Districts, Legislatures and Ministries of the Province of Ontario

1871 Ontario general election
Party	Candidate	Votes	%
Conservative	William Davis Ardagh	1,354	44.39
Liberal	Charles Cook	1,041	34.13
Liberal	William Lount	655	21.48
Turnout		3,050	69.41
Eligible voters		4,394	
Election voided
Source: Elections Ontario

1867 Ontario general election
Party	Candidate	Votes	%
Liberal	William Lount	1,431	52.40
Conservative	A. Morrison	1,300	47.60
Total valid votes		2,731	81.91
Eligible voters		3,334	
Liberal pickup new district.			
Source: Elections Ontario

== 2007 electoral reform referendum ==
2007 Ontario electoral reform referendum
Side	Votes	%
First Past the Post	28,215	62.6
Mixed member proportional	16,883	37.4
Total valid votes	45,098	100.0

== See also ==
- List of Ontario provincial electoral districts
- Canadian provincial electoral districts
