= William Davis Ardagh =

Canadian politician (1828–1893)

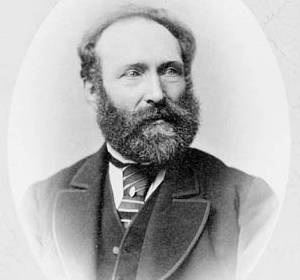

Ontario MPP
- In office 1871–1874
- Preceded by: William Lount
- Succeeded by: Riding abolished
- Constituency: Simcoe North

Personal details
- Born: March 21, 1828 County Tipperary, Ireland
- Died: April 16, 1893 (aged 65) Hoboken, New Jersey
- Party: Conservative
- Occupation: Lawyer, judge

William Davis Ardagh (March 21, 1828 – April 16, 1893) was an Ontario lawyer, judge and political figure. He represented Simcoe North in the Legislative Assembly of Ontario from 1871 to 1874.

He was born in County Tipperary in Ireland in 1828 and grew up in County Kilkenny. He came to Barrie in Canada West in 1848, articled in law and was called to the bar in 1855. He entered the practice of law in Toronto with John Willoughby Crawford. He served as deputy judge in Simcoe County in 1882 and was reeve and later mayor of Barrie. He moved to Winnipeg, Manitoba, where he served as Deputy Attorney-General and County Court judge. He also served on the Board of Police Commissioners for Winnipeg.

He died in Hoboken, New Jersey, in 1893.

== Electoral history ==
1871 Ontario general election: Simcoe North
Party	Candidate	Votes	%
Conservative	William Davis Ardagh	1,354	44.39
Liberal	Charles Cook	1,041	34.13
Liberal	William Lount	655	21.48
Turnout		3,050	69.41
Eligible voters		4,394	
Election voided
Source: Elections Ontario

Ontario provincial by-election, January 1872: Simcoe North Previous election voided
Party	Candidate	Votes	%	±%
Conservative	William Davis Ardagh	1,847	68.08	+20.48
Independent	Mr. Ramsey	866	31.92	
Total valid votes		2,713	100.0	−0.66
Conservative gain from Liberal		Swing		+20.48
Source: History of the Electoral Districts, Legislatures and Ministries of the Province of Ontario
