= 1871 Ontario general election =

Canadian provincial election

- March 21, 1871

82 seats in the 2nd Legislative Assembly of Ontario 42 seats were needed for a majority
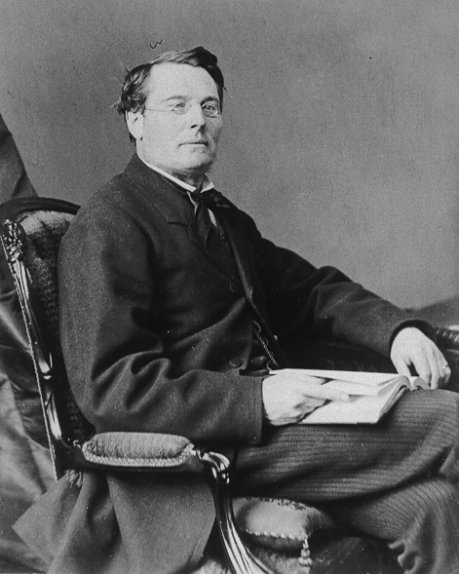

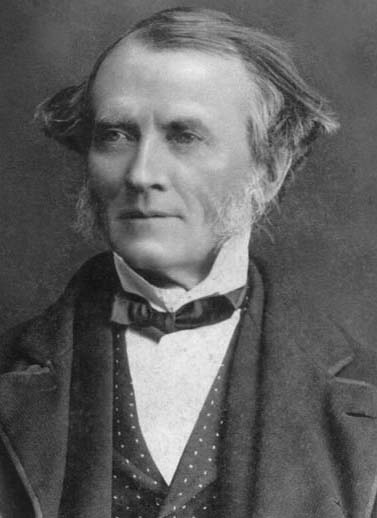
	First party	Second party
Leader	Edward Blake	John Sandfield Macdonald
Party	Liberal	Liberal–Conservative
Leader's seat	Bruce South	Cornwall
Last election	41	41
Seats won	43	38
Seat change	▲2	▼3
Premier before election
John Sandfield Macdonald
Conservative
Premier after election
Edward Blake
Liberal

The 1871 Ontario general election was the second general election held in the province of Ontario, Canada. It was held on March 21, 1871, to elect the 82 Members of the 2nd Parliament of Ontario ("MPPs").

While it is generally accepted that that the Ontario Liberals led by Edward Blake secured a slim edge over the incumbent Conservatives led by Premier John Sandfield Macdonald, such an understanding was partially developed with the benefit of hindsight on a period during which the Liberals' ousted the Sandfield Macdonald ministry, commenced the building of a far more expansive administration, and within a year carried out an orderly transition of its party and the government leadership while largely remained stable and united. In the months following the election however, the incumbent government did not concede it has lost control of the legislature and continued to govern without convening the new parliament. Challenges to the election of a dozen members further muddied the situation and provided additional fodder for Sandfield Macdonald to resist convening the new parliament for eight months and to disregard multiple votes of no confidence. The impasse was resolved on December 19 that year after his Treasurer resigned from cabinet and voted with the opposition.

Neither the outgoing nor the incoming premier remained on the scene for long. The rapid decline of Premier Sandfield Macdonald's health was evident throughout that year. His ministry's demise at the year's end foretold his own in just five months. Matthew Crooks Cameron, his principal lieutenant in government and his most ardent defender in the legislature, assumed leadership of the Conservative Party and of the opposition. Premier Blake served only ten months, resigning in October 1972 to devote his attention to leading the national Liberal Party. He and George Brown convinced their former reform colleague Oliver Mowat to return to politics to succeed him, a move that secured his own legacy as founding head of a 34-year continuous Liberal rule.

The partisan makeup of the new parliament was not remotely as straight forward as the numbers suggest, as candidates' partisan affiliations were not formally registered as they are in modern days. While partisan affiliations were generally more clearly defined than during the 1867 election, there remained candidates who made use of party labels of past affiliations that did not reflect their political allegiance in practice, or were elected without having declared their allegiance.

== Significant changes to the rules of engagement ==
As attorney general Sandfield Macdonald delivered in 1868 An Act respecting Elections of Members of the Legislative Assembly, the province's first statute that comprehensively consolidated and codified elections law. The statute instituted the key requirement to hold balloting for general elections on the same day throughout the province. It also considerably broadened the franchise.

He also delivered, at the eve the election call, the Controverted Elections Act of 1871, which consolidated an array of challenges to election conducts under corrupt practices, and depoliticised the adjudication process by transferring the power to adjudicate such challenges from parliamentary committees to the Court of Queen's Bench (predecessor of Ontario's superior court). This new regime end up playing a big role in ending his government.

While not a formal change to any legislation, both majors party held candidate nomination conventions with increased formality and managed the process with much firmer hands. The result of local nomination conventions of both parties received greater formal coverage in the press. Accordingly, while there remained no formal requirements for formal registration or declaration of candidates' partisan affiliations and no restrictions on usage, the identity of the two main parties' candidate were easier to discern than in the 1867 election. However, they also provided informal support to selected candidates not endorsed by them for various strategic reasons. Furthermore, certain candidates campaigned with labels of past affiliations but were not aligned with the party while other candidates downplay the party they are affiliated with.

This was the last election where sitting members of the federal parliament were not prevented from nomination or election. Before the federal election in the following year however, the Parliament of Canada would legislate the elimination of dual mandates by disallowing nominations of sitting provincial legislators in federal election contests. This pending would impact both parties by removing six members elected in this election from the legislature, including the incumbent Liberal Premier and Treasurer, and two Conservative former cabinet members.

== Results in summary ==
The results, as reported in formal records compiled in years by the Legislative Assembly and made available to the public (and in more recent years also reproduced by Elections Ontario) were as follows.

Elections to the 2nd Parliament of Ontario (1871)
Partisan Affiliation	Party leader	Seats				Votes (Note: 8 Conservatives and 7 Liberals were elected by acclamation and thus received no votes)			
Partisan Affiliation	Party leader	Candi- dates	1867	1871	±	Votes	±	%	± (%)
Liberal	Edward Blake	76	41	43	2▲	68,366	9,323▼	52.30%	3.54▲
Liberal–Conservative	John Sandfield Macdonald	73	41	38	3▼	59,926	20,185▼	45.85%	4.44▼
Conservative-Liberal	(label only)	1	–	1	n/a	1,116	n/a	0.85%	n/a
Others		9	–	–	–	1,303	n/a	1.00%	n/a
Total		159	82	82		130,711		100.00%	
Voter turnout						130,711	28,612▼	62.93	10.93▼
Registered electors						207,717	8,005▼		

Partisan affiliations were not recorded in contemporaneous formal elections record. Affiliations presented are the party affiliations as recorded in various resources maintained by the Legislative Assembly, which were not all compiled contemporaneously. Even contemporaneous affiliations data were a mixture of both formal undisputed declaration (made by the candidates or the parties), assessments by third parties such as the press, and presumptions from other events such as acceptance of specific offices. Such data inevitably contains some uncertainties, time lags, or inaccuracies, reflecting the lesser formality and permanence in partisan affiliation in that era.

=== Makeup of Parliament ===
2nd Parliament of Ontario; Liberal: 43 Conservative: 38 Conservative-Liberal: 1 seats vacated pending byelection when parliament first met in December 1871

== Changing allegiances, uncertain seat counts ==
Following the election, the incumbent Conservatives refused to concede and clung on to power for nine months until December 19, 1871. It claimed to commend the confidence of new parliament, but avoided testing that confidence by delaying the convocation of the new parliament seven times. While its reasoning were less than credible, the government was able to resisted calls for its resignation by leaning on uncertainties provided through a combination of factors.

=== Partisan allegiance not all certain ===
The room to dispute the overall election outcome stemmed from the uncertainty of political affiliation for some of the elected members, and from the fact that elected members' claimed political party affiliations were not the exclusive determining factor, and in some cases not even the main determining factor for their partisan allegiance. After all, the incumbent Conservative government was led by a former Liberal chosen by the national party leader in part to help legitimize the party's claim as a coalition.

In the months following the election, the press focused their analysis not on the elected members' professed partisan affiliations, but classified members as "ministerialists" committed to sustain the incumbent ministry versus those opposing the government. Known partisan affiliation were considered along with other factors such as family ties and previous behaviour, with the allegiances of certain members subject to extensive commentary and speculation. Unlike modern day election coverage, only a small number of outlets provided their summary tally of the likely strength of the two sides. The following are a few samples of reported tally. The early tallies reported 81 seats as the election for Algoma was held later on in May that year. The last tally reported in December that year took into account of seven vacancies caused by resignations and invalidations.

	Ministerialists	Opposition	Independent (or unknown)	Election undetermined	Total
Toronto Leader, 22 March 1871, p. 1	43	34	9	1	81
The Globe (Toronto), 23 March 1871, p. 2	32	41	7	1	81
Ottawa Free Press, 23 March 1871, p. 2	32	41	7	1	81
Sarnia Observer, 24 March 1871, p. 1	33	43	5		81
The Globe (Toronto), 6 December 1871, p. 2	29	40	6	7	82

=== Elections challenged and invalided ===
The election of elevens members were challenged under the newly adopted Controverted Elections Act of 1871. This prompted the incumbent ministry to delay the convening of parliament repeatedly over right months in the hopes that such challenges would results in its improved standing in the new parliament. Its standing was weakened rather than improved by the process however. While the election of members on both side of the aisle were challenged, the elections of five Conservatives but only one Liberal were invalidated. All six unseated members stood in the subsequent byelections and all but one were returned in the resulting byelections. However, since writs for byelection could only be moved while the legislature was in session, these six seats were vacant when parliament finally met for a number of weeks.

=== Double return ===
Liberal leader Edward Blake was re-elected in Bruce South and also in Durham West (where he was the MP), but would only be able to cast one vote in each division (vote) to take place in parliament. This effectively reduced the opposition Liberal rank by one until a replacement could be elected through a byelection. At that time, resignations could only take effect when the parliament was in session.

== Delayed transition of power ==
Parliament was called into session on Friday December 7, 1871. An additional Liberal member resigned on the fourth sitting day. By the time substantive debate regarding non-confidence on the government took place, eight seats were vacant, reducing the rank of the Conservatives by five and Liberals by three.

During the debate on the speech from the throne, the Sandfield Macdonald ministry suffered defeats in three recorded divisions on three consecutive days, respectively on December 13th, 14th, and 15th and each unmistakably expressed parliament's non-confidence on the ministry. The incumbent Conservative ministry initially refused to accept the recorded divisions as binding expression of non-confidence on the grounds that a tenth of the seats were vacant, but the government's position became untenable following the resignation of Provincial Treasurer Edmund Burke Wood on December 15 and defeats in two further recorded divisions on December 18, each by margin of close to 20 votes. Premier Macdonald announced the resignation of the ministry on December 19.

The transition of power mandated by this election was effected nine months after on December 20, 1971, with the formation of the province's first Liberal ministry led by Premier Edward Blake and featuring future Prime Minister Alexander Mackenzie as Treasurer. While Blake and Mackenzie remained in their provincial offices for only a year, the Liberal Party led the Ontario government for 33 more years after their departures.

Byelections for the eight vacancies noted, along with four ministerial byelections necessitated by the formation of the Blake ministry, were held in the following January. The two parties each gain a seat against the other, result in no change to their respective standings in parliament.

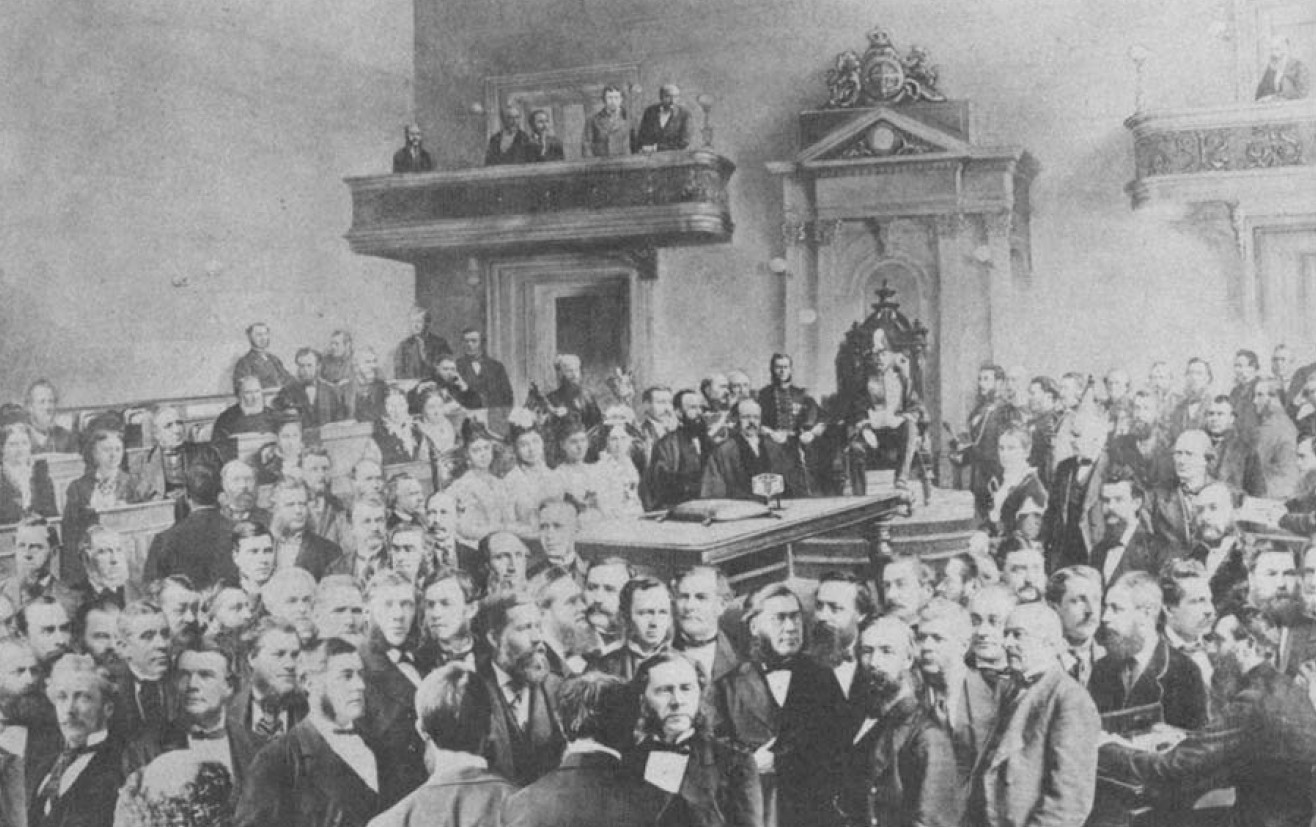
Parliament of Ontario 1872, an artistic composite of the members of the second Ontario Parliament after Premier Mowat entry in late 1872 and the departures of numerous prominent members. The women in the composite are presumably wives of the Mowat ministry members. The reason for their inclusion is unclear.

== Synopsis of results ==
Results by riding - 1871 Ontario general election
Riding	Winning party						Turnout	Votes				
Name (Note: order is as given in EO reports)	1867	Party	Votes	Share	Margin #	Margin %	Turnout	Lib	Con	CL	Ind	Total
Addington	Con	Lib	809	50.82%	26	1.63%	59.31%	809	783	–	–	1,592
Algoma	Con	Con	acclaimed									
Bothwell	Lib	Lib	1,304	55.02%	238	10.04%	72.17%	1,304	1,066	–	–	2,370
Brant North	Lib	Lib	740	60.26%	252	20.52%	60.73%	740	488	–	–	1,228
Brant South	Con	Con	1,172	52.70%	120	5.40%	66.55%	1,052	1,172	–	–	2,224
Brockville and Elizabethtown	Con	Con	620	50.28%	7	0.57%	66.33%	613	620	–	–	1,233
Bruce North	Lib	Lib	acclaimed									
Bruce South	Lib	Lib	2,082	55.21%	393	10.42%	79.79%	2,082 (Note: Edward Blake was elected in two ridings.)	1,689	–	–	3,771
Cardwell	Con	CL	1,116	63.16%	465	26.32%	67.14%	651	–	1,116	–	1,767
Carleton	Lib	Con	822	50.31%	10	0.61%	63.46%	812	822	–	–	1,634
Cornwall	Con	Con	acclaimed									
Dundas	Lib	Lib	1,216	56.09%	264	12.18%	76.28%	1,216	952	–	–	2,168
Durham East	Con	Con	acclaimed									
Durham West	Lib	Lib	acclaimed									
Elgin East	Con	Lib	1,442	53.11%	169	6.22%	63.82%	1,442	1,273	–	–	2,715
Elgin West	Con	Lib	969	55.69%	198	11.38%	76.55%	969	771	–	–	1,740
Essex	Con	Lib	1,204	51.23%	418	17.79%	50.95%	1,204	786	–	360	2,350
Frontenac	Con	Con	acclaimed									
Glengarry	Con	Con	962	52.89%	105	5.77%	72.30%	857	962	–	–	1,819
Grenville South	Con	Con	797	51.22%	38	2.44%	76.42%	759	797	–	–	1,556
Grey North	Con	Con	1,339	58.42%	386	16.84%	50.22%	953	1,339	–	–	2,292
Grey South	Con	Con	1,625	59.92%	538	19.84%	61.83%	1,087	1,625	–	–	2,712
Haldimand	Lib	Lib	1,212	60.78%	430	21.56%	59.90%	1,212	782	–	–	1,994
Halton	Lib	Lib	1,194	55.98%	255	11.95%	57.51%	1,194	939	–	–	2,133
Hamilton	Lib	Lib	1,294	54.23%	202	8.47%	60.54%	1,294	1,092	–	–	2,386
Hastings East	Con	Con	186	88.57%	162	77.14%	10.10%	24	186	–	–	210
Hastings North	Con	Con	604	86.04%	506	72.08%	41.29%	98	604	–	–	702
Hastings West	Con	Con	acclaimed									
Huron North	Con	Lib	2,259	55.86%	474	11.72%	68.67%	2,259	1,785	–	–	4,044
Huron South	Lib	Lib	1,561	53.55%	207	7.10%	71.64%	1,561	1,354	–	–	2,915
Kent	Lib	Lib	1,382	53.55%	183	7.09%	61.15%	1,382	1,199	–	–	2,581
Kingston	Con	Con	607	50.04%	21	1.73%	58.21%	586	607	–	20	1,213
Lambton	Lib	Lib	acclaimed									
Lanark North	Lib	Lib	acclaimed									
Lanark South	Con	Con	816	42.88%	150	7.88%	66.10%	666	816	–	421	1,903
Leeds North and Grenville North	Lib	Con	723	61.01%	261	22.03%	52.71%	462	723	–	–	1,185
Leeds South	Con	Con	acclaimed									
Lennox	Con	Con	1,183	56.41%	269	12.83%	62.95%	–	2,097 (Note: the incumbent John Stevenson received 914 votes)	–	–	2,097
Lincoln	Con	Con	acclaimed									
London	Con	Con	985	63.84%	427	27.67%	57.06%	558	985	–	–	1,543
Middlesex East	Lib	Con	1,622	51.41%	89	2.82%	74.92%	1,533	1,622	–	–	3,155
Middlesex North	Lib	Lib	1,286	56.58%	299	13.15%	69.34%	1,286	987	–	–	2,273
Middlesex West	Con	Lib	1,362	58.81%	408	17.62%	77.17%	1,362	954	–	–	2,316
Monck	Con	Con	931	50.13%	5	0.27%	66.35%	926	931	–	–	1,857
Niagara	Con	Con	277	62.25%	109	24.49%	56.98%	168	277	–	–	445
Norfolk North	Con	Lib	1,122	56.78%	268	13.56%	74.43%	1,122	854 (Note: James Wilson (incumbent in Norfolk North) campaigned and lost in two ridings)	–	–	1,976
Norfolk South	Lib	Lib	1,009	53.30%	125	6.60%	71.73%	1,009	884	–	–	1,893
Northumberland East	Lib	Lib	694	37.70%	30	1.63%	53.22%	694	664	–	483	1,841
Northumberland West	Lib	Lib	1,013	50.90%	36	1.81%	67.48%	1,013	977	–	–	1,990
Ontario North	Lib	Lib	1,279	73.80%	833	48.07%	44.11%	1,279	446	–	–	1,733
Ontario South	Lib	Lib	1,180	52.17%	98	4.33%	65.81%	1,180	1,082	–	–	2,262
Ottawa	Lib	Lib	574	76.33%	396	52.66%	27.68%	574	178	–	–	752
Oxford North	Lib	Lib	acclaimed									
Oxford South	Lib	Lib	1,430	57.78%	385	15.56%	65.86%	1,430	1,045	–	–	2,475
Peel	Con	Con	1,118	51.36%	59	2.71%	75.91%	1,059	1,118	–	–	2,177
Perth North	Con	Con	1,630	57.88%	444	15.77%	68.20%	1,186	1,630	–	–	2,816
Perth South	Lib	Con	1,302	50.60%	31	1.20%	71.99%	1,271	1,302	–	–	2,573
Peterborough East	Con	Con	779	61.68%	299	23.67%	60.55%	480	779	–	4	1,263
Peterborough West	Con	Lib	648	52.13%	53	4.26%	69.91%	648	595	–	–	1,243
Prescott	Lib	Con	853	54.26%	134	8.52%	75.61%	719	853	–	–	1,572
Prince Edward	Lib	Lib	1,522	52.23%	130	4.46%	78.19%	1,522	1,392 (Note: William Anderson had been elected as a Liberal in an 1870 byelection)	–	–	2,914
Renfrew North	Con	Con	640	56.74%	152	13.48%	74.31%	488	640	–	–	1,128
Renfrew South	Lib	Con	448	63.46%	190	26.91%	59.88%	258	448	–	–	706
Russell	Con	Con	773	51.29%	46	3.05%	56.15%	727	773	–	7	1,507
Simcoe North	Lib	Con	1,354	44.39%	313	10.26%	69.41%	1,696 (Note: the incumbent William Lount received 655 votes)	1,354	–	–	3,050
Simcoe South	Con	Con	acclaimed									
Stormont	Con	Con	705	50.18%	5	0.36%	74.34%	700	705	–	–	1,405
Toronto East	Con	Con	1,232	52.56%	120	5.12%	52.26%	1,112	1,232	–	–	2,344
Toronto West	Con	Lib	1,487	53.05%	171	6.10%	51.84%	1,487	1,316	–	–	2,803
Victoria North	Lib	Con	518	54.76%	90	9.51%	61.55%	428	518	–	–	946
Victoria South	Lib	Lib	1,046	60.05%	350	20.09%	59.97%	1,742 (Note: the incumbent Thomas Matchett received 696 votes)	–	–	–	1,742
Waterloo North	Lib	Lib	acclaimed									
Waterloo South	Lib	Lib	1,215	60.27%	414	20.54%	69.42%	1,215	801	–	–	2,016
Welland	Lib	Lib	1,182	53.12%	139	6.25%	61.08%	2,225 (Note: the incumbent William Beatty received 1,043 votes)	–	–	–	2,225
Wellington Centre	Con	Lib	1,465	64.94%	674	29.88%	58.89%	1,465	791	–	–	2,256
Wellington North	Lib	Lib	1,531	63.53%	652	27.05%	59.40%	1,531	879	–	–	2,410
Wellington South	Lib	Lib	acclaimed									
Wentworth North	Lib	Lib	1,071	57.24%	271	14.48%	70.95%	1,071	800	–	–	1,871
Wentworth South	Lib	Lib	957	66.97%	485	33.94%	56.08%	957	472	–	–	1,429
York East	Lib	Lib	791	70.19%	455	40.37%	36.52%	791	336	–	–	1,127
York North	Lib	Con	1,306	50.10%	5	0.19%	66.64%	1,301	1,306	–	–	2,607
York West	Con	Lib	865	56.32%	194	12.63%	62.54%	865	671	–	–	1,536

= open seat
= turnout is above provincial average
= winning candidate was in previous Legislature
= incumbent had switched allegiance
= previously incumbent in another riding
= not incumbent; was previously elected to the Legislature
= incumbency arose from byelection gain
= other incumbents renominated
= previously an MP in the House of Commons of Canada
= multiple candidates

=== Analysis ===
Party candidates in 2nd place
Party in 1st place	Party in 2nd place			Total
Party in 1st place	Accl	Lib	Con	Total
Liberal	7	2	34	43
Conservative	8	29	1	38
Conservative-Liberal		1		1
Total	15	32	35	82

Candidates ranked 1st to 3rd place, by party
Parties	Accl	1st	2nd	3rd
█ Liberal	7	36	32	1
█ Conservative	8	30	35	
█ Conservative-Liberal		1		
█ Independent				7

Resulting composition of the 2nd Legislative Assembly of Ontario
Source		Party			
Source		Lib	Con	CL	Total
Seats retained	Incumbents returned	19	16		35
Seats retained	Returned by acclamation	7	8		15
Seats retained	Open seats held		3		3
Seats retained	Ouster of incumbents changing allegiance	4			4
Seats retained	Defeat of incumbent by same-party candidate	2	1		3
Seats retained	Byelection loss reversed		1		1
Seats changing hands	Incumbents defeated	8	7		15
Seats changing hands	Open seats gained	3	2	1	6
Total		43	38	1	82

=== Members elected by region and riding ===
Party designations are as follows:

Liberal
Conservative
Conservative-Liberal

Midwestern Ontario

- Brant North: Hugh Finlayson
- Brant South: Edmund Burke Wood
- Bruce North: Donald Sinclair
- Bruce South: Edward Blake
- Grey North: Thomas Scott
- Grey South: Abram William Lauder (Note: Election declared void because of corrupt practices. Writ for new election issued. Lauder was returned in the subsequent byelection.)
- Haldimand: Jacob Baxter
- Huron North: Thomas Gibson
- Huron South: Robert Gibbons
- Norfolk North: John Fitzgerald Clarke
- Norfolk South: Simpson McCall
- Oxford North: George Perry
- Oxford South: Adam Oliver
- Perth North: Andrew Monteith
- Perth South: Thomas B. Guest
- Waterloo North: Moses Springer
- Waterloo South: Isaac Clemens
- Wellington Centre: Charles Clarke
- Wellington North: Robert McKim
- Wellington South: Peter Gow

Southwestern Ontario

- Bothwell: Archibald McKellar
- Elgin East: John Henry Wilson
- Elgin West: Thomas Hodgins
- Essex: Albert Prince
- Kent: James Dawson
- Lambton: Timothy Blair Pardee
- London: John Carling
- Middlesex East: Richard Tooley
- Middlesex North: James Sinclair Smith
- Middlesex West: Alexander Mackenzie

Northern Ontario

- Algoma: Frederick William Cumberland

Peel/Simcoe/Durham/Ontario

- Cardwell: George McManus
- Durham East: Arthur Trefusis Heneage Williams
- Durham West: Edward Blake (Note: Declined the seat in favour of sitting for Bruce South John McLeod (Liberal) won the subsequent byelection.)
- Ontario North: Thomas Paxton
- Ontario South: Charles Godfrey
- Peel: John Coyne
- Simcoe North: William Davis Ardagh (Note: Election declared void because of corrupt practices. Writ for new election issued. Ardagh was returned in the subsequent byelection.)
- Simcoe South: Thomas Roberts Ferguson

York/Toronto

- Toronto East: Matthew Crooks Cameron
- Toronto West: Adam Crooks
- York East: Hugh Powell Crosby
- York North: Alfred Boultbee
- York West: Peter Patterson

Wentworth/Halton/Niagara

- Halton: William Barber
- Hamilton: James Miller Williams
- Lincoln: John Charles Rykert
- Monck: Lachlin McCallum
- Niagara: Stephen Richards
- Welland: James George Currie
- Wentworth North: Robert Christie
- Wentworth South: William Sexton

Ottawa Valley

- Carleton: George William Monk (Note: Election declared void because of corrupt practices. Writ for new election issued. Monk was returned in the subsequent byelection.)
- Lanark North: Daniel Galbraith
- Lanark South: Abraham Code
- Ottawa: Richard William Scott
- Prescott: George Wellesley Hamilton (Note: Election declared void because of corrupt practices. Writ for new election issued. Hamilton was returned in the subsequent byelection.)
- Renfrew North: Thomas Deacon
- Renfrew South: Eric Harrington
- Russell: William Craig

Saint Lawrence Valley

- Brockville and Elizabethtown: William Fitzsimmons
- Cornwall: John Sandfield MacDonald
- Dundas: Simon S. Cook
- Glengarry: James Craig
- Grenville South: Mcneil Clarke
- Kingston: William Robinson
- Leeds North and Grenville North: Henry Merrick
- Leeds South: Herbert Stone MacDonald
- Stormont: William Colquhoun (Note: Election declared void because of corrupt practices. Writ for new election issued. James Bethune (Liberal) won the subsequent byelection.)

Southeastern Ontario

- Addington: Hammel Madden Deroche
- Frontenac: Delino Dexter Calvin
- Hastings East: Henry Corby
- Hastings North: George Henry Boulter
- Hastings West: Ketchum Graham
- Lennox: John Thomas Grange
- Northumberland East: William Wilson Webb
- Northumberland West: Alexander Fraser
- Peterborough East: George Read
- Peterborough West: Thomas McCulloch Fairbairn
- Prince Edward: Gideon Striker (Note: Election declared void because of corrupt practices. Writ for new election issued. James Simeon McCuaig (Conservative) won the subsequent byelection.)
- Victoria North: Duncan McRae
- Victoria South: Samuel Casey Wood

=== Byelections ===
Electoral District	Member initially elected/ outgoing member	Reason for vacancy (subsequent election)		Byelection held	Member elected in byelection Changed party; Acclaimed	
Carleton	George William Monk	Election voided by court	✓	January 1872		George William Monk
Grey South	Abram William Lauder	Election voided by court	✓	January 1872		Abram William Lauder
Prescott	George Wellesley Hamilton	Election voided by court	✓	January 1872		George Wellesley Hamilton
Prince Edward|	Gideon Striker	Election voided by court	✓	January 1872		Gideon Striker
Simcoe North	William Davis Ardagh	Election voided by court	✓	January 1872		William Davis Ardagh
Stormont	William Colquhoun	Election voided by court	✗	January 1872	Redirect	James Bethune
Durham West	Edward Blake	Elected in two electoral districts	n/a	January 1872		John McLeod
Bothwell	Archibald McKellar	Ministerial by-election (Blake ministry)	✓	January 1872	A-Class article	Archibald McKellar
Ottawa	Richard William Scott	Ministerial by-election (Blake ministry)	✓	January 1872	A-Class article	Richard William Scott
Toronto West	Adam Crooks	Ministerial by-election (Blake ministry)	✓	January 1872		Adam Crooks
Wellington South	Peter Gow	Ministerial by-election (Blake ministry)	✓	January 1872	A-Class article	Peter Gow
Northumberland West	Alexander Fraser	Resignation (December 12, 1971)	n/a	January 1872	Redirect	Charles Gifford
Grenville South	Mcneil Clarke	Died in office (February 29, 1872)	n/a	March 30, 1872	Redirect	Christopher Finlay Fraser
Cornwall	John Sandfield MacDonald	Died in office (June 1, 1872)	n/a	July 16, 1872		John Goodall Snetsinger
Bruce South	Edward Blake	Sought re-election as MP (in 1872 federal election)	✓	September 1872		Rupert Mearse Wells
London	John Carling	Sought re-election as MP (in 1872 federal election)	✓	September 1872		William Ralph Meredith
Middlesex West	Alexander Mackenzie (Note: Re-elected in Lambton)	Sought re-election as MP (in 1872 federal election)	✓	September 1872		John Watterworth
Monck	Lachlin McCallum	Sought re-election as MP (in 1872 federal election)	✗	September 1872	Redirect	Henry Ryan Haney
Grenville South	Christopher Finlay Fraser	Election voided by court	✓	October 16, 1872		Christopher Finlay Fraser
Lambton	Timothy Blair Pardee	Ministerial by-election (Mowat ministry)	✓	November 1872	A-Class article	Timothy Blair Pardee
Oxford North	George Perry	Resignation (for seatless party leader)		November 1872	A-Class article	Oliver Mowat
Brant South	Edmund Burke Wood	Sought election as MP (Note: Sought federal seat for Durham West)	✓	May 2, 1873		Arthur Sturgis Hardy
Grenville South	Christopher Finlay Fraser	Ministerial by-election (Mowat ministry)	✓	December 1873	A-Class article	Christopher Finlay Fraser
Wellington North	Robert McKim	Sought election as MP (Note: Sought federal seat for Wellington Centre)	✗	February 1874		George Turner Orton

== See also ==
- Politics of Ontario
- List of Ontario political parties
- Premier of Ontario
- Leader of the Opposition (Ontario)
