= Matthew Crooks Cameron =

Canadian politician (1822–1887)

Sir Matthew Crooks Cameron
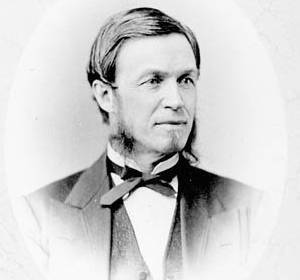
- Matthew Cameron, 1872

Ontario MPP
- In office 1867–1878
- Preceded by: New riding
- Succeeded by: Alexander Morris
- Constituency: Toronto East

Personal details
- Born: October 2, 1822 Dundas, Upper Canada
- Died: June 25, 1887 (aged 64) Toronto, Ontario, Canada
- Party: Conservative
- Spouse: Charlotte Ross Wedd
- Occupation: Lawyer

Sir Matthew Crooks Cameron, QC (2 October 1822 – 25 June 1887) was a politician in Ontario, Canada. He was a Conservative member of the Legislative Assembly of Ontario from 1867 to 1878. He represented the riding of Toronto East. He served in the cabinet of the first premier, John Sandfield Macdonald. After Macdonald's defeat in 1871, he became leader of the Conservative Party and served as Leader of the Opposition until his retirement from politics in 1878. After the legislature, he served as Chief Justice of the Court of Common Pleas until his death in 1887. In 1887 he was made a Knight Bachelor.

== Background ==
He was born in Dundas in Upper Canada, during his studies at Upper Canada College, he lost one leg after a shooting accident. Cameron later articled in law, was called to the bar in 1849 and entered practice with William Henry Boulton in Toronto, Ontario. He was created a QC on 27 March 1863, and elected a bencher of the Law Society of Upper Canada in April 1871. In 1887, he was created a Knight Bachelor shortly before his death.

== Politics ==
In 1859, he was elected to Toronto City Council to represent St James' Ward. Two years, later, in January 1861, he was defeated in his effort to become Mayor of Toronto, but later that year, he was elected to the Legislative Assembly of the Province of Canada for North Ontario. He was defeated in 1863 but was elected in an 1864 by-election when the incumbent, William McDougall, was forced to run for re-election after he was named to the executive council. Cameron was opposed to Confederation, preferring a legislative union. In 1867, he ran unsuccessfully in Ontario North in the federal election but was elected for Toronto East to the provincial legislature.

Cameron entered the Cabinet of Premier John Sandfield Macdonald in 1867 as Provincial Secretary and Registrar of Ontario.

In 1871, he became Commissioner of Crown Lands. With the defeat of the Macdonald government in the provincial election that December, Cameron became leader of the Ontario Conservative Party, but stepped down in 1878 to accept the appointment of Chief Justice of the Court of Common Pleas.

== Electoral history ==
1867 Canadian federal election: Ontario North
Party	Candidate	Votes
Liberal	John Hall Thompson	1,628
Conservative	Matthew Crooks Cameron	1,362
Eligible voters		3,674
Source: Canadian Parliamentary Guide, 1871

1867 Ontario general election: Toronto East
Party	Candidate	Votes	%
Conservative	Matthew Crooks Cameron	1,178	56.28
Liberal	Mr. Stock	914	43.67
Independent	R.M. Allen	1	0.05
Total valid votes		2,093	49.80
Eligible voters		4,203	
Conservative pickup new district.			
Source: Elections Ontario

1871 Ontario general election: Toronto East
Party	Candidate	Votes	%	±%
Conservative	Matthew Crooks Cameron	1,232	52.56	−3.72
Liberal	Mr. Medcalf	1,112	47.44	+3.77
Turnout		2,344	52.26	+2.46
Eligible voters		4,485		
Conservative hold		Swing		−3.75
Source: Elections Ontario

1875 Ontario general election: Toronto East
Party	Candidate	Votes	%	±%
Conservative	Matthew Crooks Cameron	1,849	53.83	+1.27
Liberal	Adam Crooks	1,579	45.97	−1.47
Independent	R.M. Allen	7	0.20	
Total valid votes		3,435	54.42	+2.16
Eligible voters		6,312		
Conservative hold		Swing		+1.37
Source: Elections Ontario

Political offices
Preceded by Edward Blake	Leader of the Opposition in the Ontario Legislature; 1871–1878	Succeeded by William Ralph Meredith
