= John Sandfield Macdonald =

Canadian politician and 1st Premier of Ontario

The Honourable John Sandfield Macdonald QC
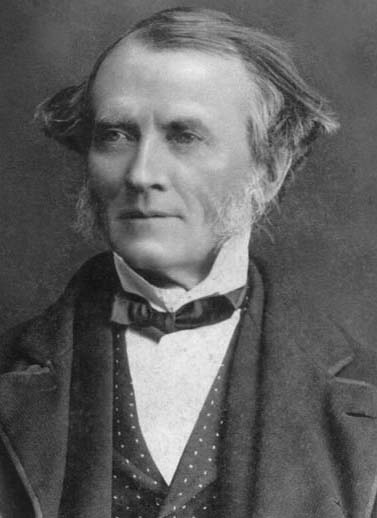
- Macdonald, c. 1870

1st Premier of Ontario
- In office July 16, 1867 – December 20, 1871
- Monarch: Victoria
- Lieutenant Governor: Henry William Stisted; William Pearce Howland
- Preceded by: Position established
- Succeeded by: Edward Blake

Joint Premier of the Province of Canada
- In office May 24, 1862 – March 29, 1864
- Governor General: Viscount Monck
- Preceded by: John A. Macdonald
- Succeeded by: John A. Macdonald

Member of the Legislative Assembly of the Province of Canada for Glengarry
- In office 1841–1844
- Preceded by: Position established

Personal details
- Born: December 12, 1812 St. Raphael West, Glengarry County, Upper Canada
- Died: June 1, 1872 (aged 59) Cornwall, Ontario, Canada
- Resting place: St. Andrews Cemetery, South Stormont, Ontario
- Party: Conservative
- Other political affiliations: Liberal (federal)
- Spouse: Marie Christine Waggaman
- Relatives: Donald Alexander Macdonald and Alexander Francis Macdonald

Military service
- Allegiance: Upper Canada
- Branch/service: Canadian militia
- Years of service: 1830s–1852
- Rank: Lieutenant; Lieutenant-Colonel
- Unit: Queen's Light Infantry Militia (Toronto); Glengarry Militia; Regiment of the Eastern District
- Commands: 4th Battalion, Glengarry Militia

John Sandfield Macdonald, QC (December 12, 1812 – June 1, 1872) was the joint premier of the Province of Canada from 1862 to 1864. He was also the first premier of Ontario from 1867 to 1871, one of the four founding provinces created at Confederation in 1867. He served as both premier and attorney general of Ontario from July 16, 1867, to December 20, 1871.

He was referred to by his middle name, Sandfield, and often signed his correspondence and documents as J. Sandfield Macdonald.

== Early life and legal career ==
Born in 1812 in Glengarry County, Upper Canada, John Sandfield was the first of five children for Alexander and Nancy Macdonald, who were Roman Catholic Highland Scots. His mother died when he was eight. Independent in mind, Macdonald twice tried to set out from home when he was eleven.

Leaving school at 16, he became a clerk at several general stores, before deciding to enter the legal profession, eventually articling under Archibald McLean. When McLean was later elevated to the Court of King's Bench for Upper Canada, Macdonald became his assistant, which allowed him to meet Allan MacNab, Thomas Talbot and William Henry Draper (with whom he would resume his articling). Draper and McLean were leaders in the Tory political group.

Macdonald was later appointed as Queen's messenger, charged with carrying dispatches between the Lieutenant-Governor of Upper Canada and the British Minister in Washington.

In 1840, while he was on one of his missions from the Lieutenant-Governor (the Earl of Durham) to the British Minister at Washington he met Marie Christine Waggaman, daughter of George Augustus Waggaman, a former Whig senator from Louisiana. They were married in 1840 and raised three children.

== Province of Canada politics ==
In 1841, Macdonald was approached by two local conservative political figures, Alexander Fraser and John McGillivray, to stand for election for the Glengarry riding in the new Legislative Assembly of the Province of Canada. With their support, he easily won election and entered Parliament, ostensibly in support of Draper. However, Macdonald at this point did not have firm political views, and once in Parliament, he gradually shifted towards the Reform group and away from Draper. In the first session of the Parliament, he supported the union of the Province of Canada and the government of Governor General, Lord Sydenham, but for the rest of the first Parliament, he consistently voted in support of Robert Baldwin, the leader of the Reformers of Canada West.

Macdonald served as a Lieutenant in the Queen's Light Infantry Militia in Toronto in the 1830s and early 1840s. On October 17, 1842, Macdonald was promoted to Lieutenant-Colonel and appointed to command the 4th Battalion of the Glengarry Militia. He commanded the 4th Glengarry until 1852 when he was replaced by his brother Donald Alexander Macdonald.

A Reformer and advocate of responsible government, Macdonald served in all eight Assemblies of the Province of Canada prior to Confederation, the only person to have done so. He also served in several pre-confederation administrations. From 1849 to 1851 he served as solicitor general for Canada West in the first responsible government in United Province under Robert Baldwin and Louis-Hippolyte Lafontaine. When Francis Hincks became premier, Macdonald was not made attorney general for Canada West as he has expected and resigned as solicitor general. Hincks disliked Macdonald and felt he was too independent in his thinking. Though bitter, Macdonald accepted election in 1852 as Speaker of the Assembly - a post he filled with great distinction. During political maneuvres of 1854, which led to the formation of a Liberal-Conservative ministry, he severely criticized Lord Elgin for alleged improprieties and thus became a leading figure in the Reform opposition, a role he shared with George Brown.

The Liberal-Conservative ministry led by John A. Macdonald (no relation) and George-Étienne Cartier was defeated in 1862 when it failed to get a bill authorizing payment to the British government for defense expenses in anticipation of U.S. invasion. John S. Macdonald and Louis-Victor Sicotte became co-premiers of the Province of Canada, leading the first and only Liberal ministry in the United Province with the support of a bloc formally uniting the members of the Clear Grits from Canada West and Parti rouge Canada East. It was this time when Macdonald suffered a collapsed lung from chronic tuberculosis. His ministry struggled to maintain confidence however, and fell in March 1864, when George Brown, a former ally turned bitter rival over confederation and representation issues, backed the Macdonald-Cartier bloc.

== Premier and Attorney-General of Ontario ==
Macdonald was elected for the provincial riding of Cornwall in the first general election of 1867 for the new province of Ontario. He was re-elected in the election of 1871.

Macdonald was initially an opponent of Canadian Confederation, but came to accept it and became an ally of Sir John A. Macdonald. John A. Macdonald helped manoeuvre Sandfield Macdonald into the position of first Premier of Ontario. His led a moderate ministry supported by a coalition of liberals and conservatives (described in contemporary accounts as a "Patent Combination" government). In addition to serving as Premier, he also occupied the post of Attorney General of Ontario. In the early years of confederation, politicians were allowed to serve simultaneously in the House of Commons and in a provincial legislature. From 1867 to 1872, Macdonald was also a Liberal MP in the House of Commons of Canada.

Macdonald instituted several notable achievements, in addition to setting up the initial machinery of government for the new Province:

- An Act modelled on the US Homestead Acts provided for virtually free land for homesteaders on surveyed crown lands of Muskoka, Haliburton and north Hastings, and further Acts encouraged the northern extension of railways into those areas.
- The District of Muskoka was created to aid in the colonization effort, from townships withdrawn from Simcoe County, Victoria County and the District of Nipissing.
- Education aid was concentrated into the University of Toronto, at the expense of the denominational colleges.
- The election laws were reformed in 1868 to establish a single date for elections to be held (as opposed to a range of dates), and to broaden the franchise.

His government suffered from defections by more radical Reformers. This group joined with the Clear Grits to form the opposition Liberal Party led by Edward Blake and Oliver Mowat. In December 1871, Macdonald's government was defeated by Edward Blake's Liberals. Macdonald resigned, and died several months later.

== Family ==
Macdonald's brothers, Donald Alexander Macdonald and Alexander Francis Macdonald, were also politicians, and served as federal Members of Parliament. Donald, who served as an MP the longest of the three brothers, was in the House of Commons concurrently with both Sandfield and Alexander, although Sandfield and Alexander did not serve concurrently with each other.

== Legacy ==
Sandfield Macdonald would be the only Roman Catholic Premier of Ontario for 132 years; not until Dalton McGuinty became premier in 2003 would another Roman Catholic assume the office. After Macdonald's tenure, sectarian tensions in the province rose, and the Conservative Party increasingly became identified with the Orange Order and sectarian Protestantism. Even though most of the party's leaders were not sectarian themselves (with a few notable exceptions), Orange Ontarians became a core constituency of the party that leaders were loath to neglect. Catholics, meanwhile, increasingly voted for the Liberal Party. While the Liberals could never be called a Catholic party, the Catholic vote became as important a constituency to the Liberals as the Orange vote became to the Conservatives.

Nineteenth century religious tensions aside, Macdonald's election as Ontario's first Premier makes his Catholicism an important historic symbol. Similarly the selection of John Thompson, Canada's first Roman Catholic Prime Minister only twenty five years after Confederation, was indicative of the ambitions of Roman Catholics to be full and equal participants in the newly created country.

Macdonald is buried in historic St. Andrews Cemetery in St. Andrews West, South Stormont, Ontario. The gravesite is marked by a bronze plaque, the first under an Ontario Heritage Trust program to honour Ontario premiers at their burial sites, similar to a national program to mark the graves of prime ministers.

The Macdonald Block Complex, a major set of four office towers which house ministries of the Ontario government, is named after Macdonald.

A statue of Macdonald stands in front of the east side of the Ontario Legislative Building in Toronto. The monument, unveiled in 1909, was sculpted by Walter Allward.

He was portrayed by Aidan Devine in the 2011 CBC Television film John A.: Birth of a Country.

== Archives ==
There is a John Sandfield Macdonald fonds at Library and Archives Canada. The archival reference number is R3034. There is also a John Sandfield Macdonald collection at the Archives of Ontario.

== Electoral history ==
=== Provincial ===
1867 Ontario general election: Cornwall
Party	Candidate	Votes	%
Conservative	John Sandfield Macdonald	479	64.73
Liberal	William C. Allen	261	35.27
Total valid votes		740	72.27
Eligible voters		1,024	
Conservative pickup new district.			
Source: Elections Ontario

1871 Ontario general election: Cornwall
Party	Candidate	Votes
Conservative	John Sandfield Macdonald	Acclaimed
Source: Elections Ontario

=== Federal ===
1867 Canadian federal election: Cornwall
Party	Candidate	Votes
Liberal	John Sandfield Macdonald	451
Unknown	? Mattice	295
Source: Canadian Elections Database

Political offices
Patent Combination, John Sandfield Macdonald ministry, Province of Ontario (1867-71)
Preceded by John A. Macdonald (as Joint Premier for Canada West)	Premier of Ontario; 1867–1871	Succeeded by Edward Blake
Preceded by John A. Macdonald (as Joint Premier for Canada West)	Attorney General of Ontario; 1867–1871	Succeeded by Adam Crooks
Sandfield Macdonald—Sicotte ministry, United Province of Canada (1862-63)
Sandfield Macdonald—Dorion ministry, United Province of Canada (1863-64)
Preceded by John A. Macdonald	Joint Premiers of the Province of Canada; 1862–1864; Served alongside: Louis-Victor Sicotte (1862–63); Antoine-Aimé Dorion (1863-64)	Succeeded by John A. Macdonald
Preceded by John A. Macdonald	Attorney General, Upper Canada; August 2–4, 1858; 1862–1864	Succeeded by John A. Macdonald
Second LaFontaine—Baldwin ministry, United Province of Canada (1848-51)
Preceded by William Hume Blake	Solicitor General, Upper Canada; 1849–1851	Succeeded by John Ross

Legislative Assembly of Ontario
Preceded by Self as MPP of Province of Canada	MPP for Cornwall; 1867–1872	Succeeded by Alexander Fraser McIntyre
Parliament of Canada
Preceded by Self as MPP of Province of Canada	Member of Parliament for Cornwall; 1867–1872	Succeeded by Darby Bergin
Legislative Assembly of the Province of Canada
Preceded by Roderick McDonald	MPP for Cornwall; 1857–1867	Assembly disbanded upon Canadian Confederation
Preceded by Augustin-Norbert Morin	Speaker of the Legislative Assembly; 1852–1853	Succeeded by Louis Victor Sicotte
New assembly	MPP for Glengarry; 1841–1857	Succeeded by Donald Alexander Macdonald
