= Norfolk South =

Norfolk South may refer to:

- Norfolk South (federal electoral district), former Canadian federal electoral district, 1867–1904
- Norfolk South (provincial electoral district), former Ontario provincial electoral district, 1867–1926
- South Norfolk (UK Parliament constituency)
