= William Andrew Charlton =

Canadian politician

The Hon. William Andrew Charlton
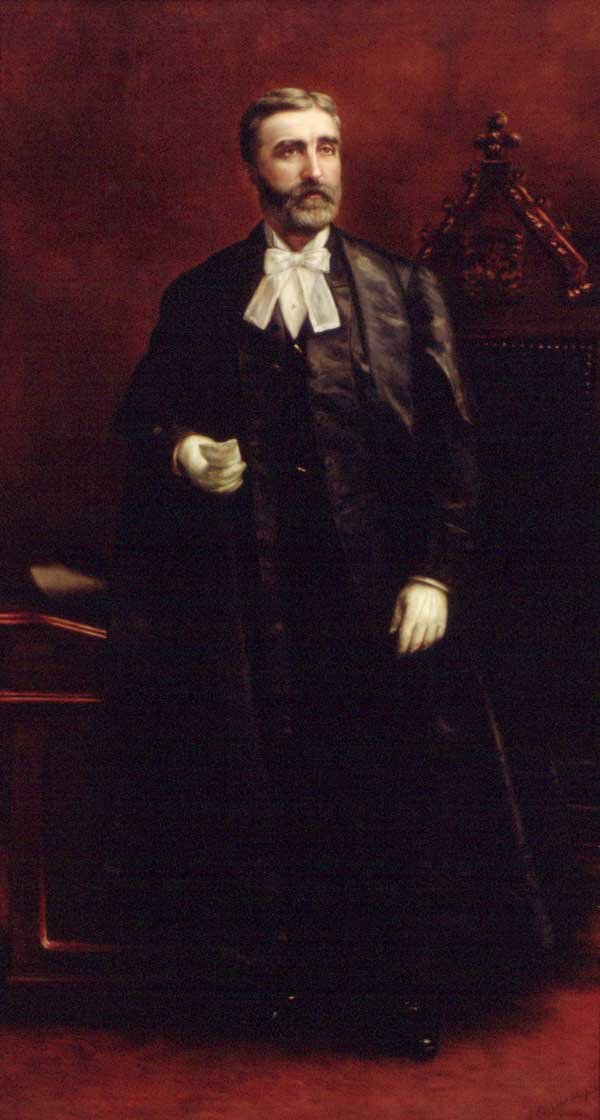

Member of the Canadian Parliament for Norfolk
- In office 1911–1921
- Preceded by: Alexander McCall
- Succeeded by: John Alexander Wallace

Ontario MPP
- In office 1890–1904
- Preceded by: William Morgan
- Succeeded by: Arthur Clarence Pratt
- Constituency: Norfolk South

10th Speaker of the Legislative Assembly of Ontario
- In office March 10, 1903 – April 26, 1904
- Preceded by: François-Eugène-Alfred Évanturel
- Succeeded by: Joseph St. John

Personal details
- Born: May 9, 1841 Cattaraugus County, New York
- Died: November 9, 1930 (aged 89)
- Party: Liberal
- Spouse: Nellie Rockwell (m. 1869)
- Relations: John M. Charlton, brother
- Occupation: Merchant

William Andrew Charlton, PC (May 9, 1841 – November 9, 1930) was a Canadian lumber merchant, businessman and politician.

Born in Cattaraugus County, New York, the son of Adam Charlton, he immigrated to Canada in 1849 with his family. In 1869, he married Nellie Rockwell. Charlton entered politics and was first elected to the Ontario legislature as the Liberal Member of the Legislative Assembly for Norfolk South in the 1890 general election and served until 1904.

He served as Speaker of the Legislative Assembly of Ontario in 1903-1904 and was Commissioner of Public Works from 1904 until 1905.

Charlton moved to federal politics and won a seat in the House of Commons of Canada as the federal Liberal Member of Parliament for Norfolk in the 1911 federal election. During the Conscription Crisis of 1917, he supported the government of Sir Robert Borden and crossed the floor to run in the 1917 federal election as a Liberal-Unionist in support of Borden's new Union government defeating Laurier-Liberal candidate John Alexander Wallace.

In 1921, he was named to the Queen's Privy Council for Canada.

His brother, John M. Charlton, also served in the House of Commons.
