= Archibald Little =

Archibald Little may refer to,

- Alicia Little (1845–1926), better known as Mrs. Archibald Little, English travel writer known for her works and photography in China in the 1880s
- Archibald John Little (1838–1908), English merchant in China
- Archibald Little (British Army officer) (1810–1891), English soldier
- Archibald Little (politician) (1837–1922), provincial politician in Ontario, Canada
