= George David Sewell =

Canadian politician from Ontario

Member of the Ontario Provincial Parliament for Norfolk North
- In office October 20, 1919 – October 18, 1926
- Preceded by: Thomas Robert Atkinson
- Succeeded by: constituency abolished

Personal details
- Died: December 17, 1938 Brantford, Ontario
- Resting place: Greenwood Cemetery, Waterford, Ontario
- Party: United Farmers of Ontario

George David Sewell was a Canadian politician from the United Farmers of Ontario. He represented Norfolk North in the Legislative Assembly of Ontario from 1919 to 1926.

In his later years, Sewell was active in the Liberal Party of Ontario and was elected a school trustee.

== See also ==
- 15th Parliament of Ontario
- 16th Parliament of Ontario
