= David Tisdale =

Canadian politician (1835–1911)

The Honourable David Tisdale PC
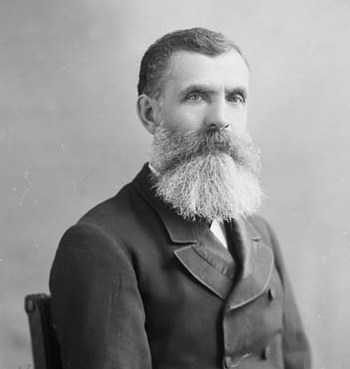

Member of the Canadian Parliament for Norfolk South
- In office 1887–1904
- Preceded by: Joseph Jackson
- Succeeded by: Electoral district was abolished

Member of the Canadian Parliament for Norfolk
- In office 1904–1908
- Preceded by: Electoral district was created
- Succeeded by: Alexander McCall

Personal details
- Born: September 8, 1835 Charlotteville Township, Upper Canada
- Died: March 31, 1911 (aged 75) Simcoe, Ontario
- Party: Conservative
- Cabinet: Minister of Militia and Defense (1896)

David Tisdale, PC (September 8, 1835 – March 31, 1911) was a Canadian politician.

== Biography ==
Born in Charlotteville Township, Upper Canada, the son of Ephraim Tisdale and Hannah Price, he was educated at the Simcoe Grammar School and called to the Ontario bar in 1858. He was made a Queen's Counsel in 1872. He served in the Canadian Militia at the time of the Trent Affair in 1861, was promoted Captain in 1862 and at Niagara in 1865. He also did service during the Fenian raids in 1866. He was appointed Lieutenant-Colonel of the 39th Norfolk Battalion of Rifles on September 28, 1866. He retired, retaining his rank, in 1876. He served on the town council for Simcoe, also serving as reeve and as a member of the council for Norfolk County. Tisdale was president of the Crown Life Insurance Company, the St. Clair and Erie Ship Canal Company and the Wawa Gold Mining Company.

He ran but was defeated for the House of Commons of Canada in the 1874 federal election in the riding of Norfolk North, but was elected in 1887 in Norfolk South. A Conservative, he was re-elected in 1891, 1896, 1900, and 1904. In 1896, he was the Minister of Militia and Defence.

Tisdale married Sarah Araminta Walker in 1858.

== Electoral record ==
1887 Canadian federal election: South Riding of Norfolk
Party	Candidate	Votes
Conservative	TISDALE, David	1,797
Liberal	JACKSON, Joseph	1,736

1891 Canadian federal election: South Riding of Norfolk
Party	Candidate	Votes
Conservative	TISDALE, David	2,051
Liberal	ELLIS, Jonathan	1,639

1896 Canadian federal election: Norfolk South
Party	Candidate	Votes
Conservative	TISDALE, Hon. David	2,383
Patrons of Industry	WALKER, George	2,110

1900 Canadian federal election: Norfolk South
Party	Candidate	Votes
Conservative	TISDALE, Hon. David	2,472
Liberal	ATKINSON, Thos. R.	2,200
