= Norfolk North (provincial electoral district) =

Former provincial electoral district in Ontario, Canada

Ontario electoral district

Defunct provincial electoral district
- Legislature: Legislative Assembly of Ontario
- District created: 1867
- District abolished: 1925
- First contested: 1867
- Last contested: 1923

Norfolk North was an electoral riding in Ontario, Canada. It was created in 1867 at the time of confederation and was abolished in 1925 before the 1926 election.

== Members of Provincial Parliament ==
Norfolk North
Assembly	Years	Member	Party
1st	1867–1871	James Wilson	Conservative
2nd	1871–1874	John Fitzgerald Clarke	Liberal
3rd	1875–1879	John Fitzgerald Clarke	Liberal
4th	1879–1883	John Bailey Freeman	Liberal
5th	1883–1886	John Bailey Freeman	Liberal
6th	1886–1890	John Bailey Freeman	Liberal
7th	1890–1890	John Bailey Freeman	Liberal
7th	1891–1894	Edwin Clarendon Carpenter	Liberal
8th	1894–1898	Edwin Clarendon Carpenter	Liberal
9th	1898–1902	Edwin Clarendon Carpenter	Liberal
10th	1902–1903	Frederick Snider	Conservative
10th	1903–1904	Archibald Little	Liberal
11th	1905–1908	Thomas Robert Atkinson	Liberal
12th	1908–1911	Hugh Paterson Innes	Conservative
13th	1911–1914	Thomas Robert Atkinson	Liberal
14th	1914–1919	Thomas Robert Atkinson	Liberal
15th	1919–1923	George David Sewell	United Farmers
16th	1923–1926	George David Sewell	United Farmers
Sourced from the Ontario Legislative Assembly
Merged into Norfolk before the 1926 election

== Election results ==
1923 Ontario general election
Party	Candidate	Votes	%	±%
United Farmers	George David Sewell	3,068	51.87	–11.23
Conservative	George M. Boughner	2,847	48.13	+11.23
Total valid votes		5,915	99.31	
Total rejected ballots		41	0.69	–1.38
Turnout		5,956	61.16	–15.47
Eligible voters		9,738		
United Farmers hold		Swing		–11.23
Source: Elections Ontario

1919 Ontario general election
Party	Candidate	Votes	%	±%
United Farmers	George David Sewell	4,522	63.09	–
Conservative	W. E. Sutherland	2,645	36.91	–
Total valid votes		7,167	97.94	
Total rejected ballots		151	2.06	+0.86
Turnout		7,318	76.63	+8.22
Eligible voters		9,550		
United Farmers gain from Liberal		Swing		–
Source: Elections Ontario

1914 Ontario general election
Party	Candidate	Votes	%	±%
Liberal	Thomas Robert Atkinson	1,927	73.61	+18.40
Liberal-Anti-Temperance	Frederick James Sheahan	691	26.39	–
Total valid votes		2,618	98.79	
Total rejected ballots		32	1.21	+0.17
Turnout		2,650	68.40	–6.15
Eligible voters		3,874		
Liberal hold		Swing		+9.20
Source: Elections Ontario

1911 Ontario general election
Party	Candidate	Votes	%	±%
Liberal	Thomas Robert Atkinson	1,740	55.20	+6.29
Conservative	William Murray McGuire	1,412	44.80	–6.29
Total valid votes		3,152	98.96	
Total rejected ballots		33	1.04	+0.27
Turnout		3,185	74.56	–19.46
Eligible voters		4,272		
Liberal gain from Conservative		Swing		+6.29
Source: Elections Ontario

1908 Ontario general election
Party	Candidate	Votes	%	±%
Conservative	Hugh Paterson Innes	1,720	51.08	+6.44
Liberal	Thomas Robert Atkinson	1,647	48.92	–6.44
Total valid votes		3,367	99.23	
Total rejected ballots		26	0.77	+0.68
Turnout		3,393	94.02	+5.87
Eligible voters		3,609		
Conservative gain from Liberal		Swing		+6.44
Source: Elections Ontario

1905 Ontario general election
Party	Candidate	Votes	%	±%
Liberal	Thomas Robert Atkinson	1,969	55.36	+3.98
Conservative	Frederick Snider	1,588	44.64	–3.98
Total valid votes		3,557	99.92	
Total rejected ballots		3	0.08	+0.08
Turnout		3,560	88.14	–
Eligible voters		4,039		
Liberal hold		Swing		+3.98
Source: Elections Ontario

Ontario provincial by-election, January 7, 1903 Void Election
Party	Candidate	Votes	%	±%
Liberal	Archibald Little	1,864	51.38	+1.72
Conservative	Frederick Snider	1,764	48.62	–1.72
Total valid votes		3,628	100.00	
Total rejected ballots		–		
Turnout		3,628	–	–
Eligible voters				
Liberal gain from Conservative		Swing		+1.72
Source: Elections Ontario

1902 Ontario general election
Party	Candidate	Votes	%	±%
Conservative	Frederick Snider	1,704	50.34	+3.89
Liberal	Edwin Clarendon Carpenter	1,681	49.66	–3.89
Total valid votes		3,385	98.89	
Total rejected ballots		38	1.11	+0.71
Turnout		3,423	80.13	–0.97
Eligible voters		4,272		
Conservative gain from Liberal		Swing		+3.89
Source: Elections Ontario

1898 Ontario general election
Party	Candidate	Votes	%	±%
Liberal	Edwin Clarendon Carpenter	1,885	53.55	–1.09
Conservative	D. Robertson	1,635	46.45	–
Total valid votes		3,520	99.60	
Total rejected ballots		14	0.40	+0.20
Turnout		3,534	81.09	+4.46
Eligible voters		4,358		
Liberal hold		Swing		–0.54
Source: Elections Ontario

1894 Ontario general election
Party	Candidate	Votes	%	±%
Liberal	Edwin Clarendon Carpenter	1,690	54.64	+1.06
Conservative-Protestant Protective	Dent Dalton	1,403	45.36	–
Total valid votes		3,093	99.81	
Total rejected ballots		6	0.19	+0.19
Turnout		3,099	76.63	–
Eligible voters		4,044		
Liberal hold		Swing		+0.53
Source: Elections Ontario

Ontario provincial by-election, January 23, 1891 Death of John Bailey Freeman
Party	Candidate	Votes	%	±%
Liberal	Edwin Clarendon Carpenter	1,720	53.58	–1.72
Conservative	E. Boughner	1,490	46.42	+1.72
Total valid votes		3,210	100.00	
Total rejected ballots		–		
Turnout		3,210	–	–
Eligible voters				
Liberal hold		Swing		–1.72
Source: Elections Ontario

1890 Ontario general election
Party	Candidate	Votes	%	±%
Liberal	John Bailey Freeman	1,601	55.30	–1.21
Conservative	E. Boughner	1,294	44.70	+1.21
Total valid votes		2,895	99.14	
Total rejected ballots		25	0.86	+0.24
Turnout		2,920	72.46	+2.31
Eligible voters		4,030		
Liberal hold		Swing		–1.21
Source: Elections Ontario

1886 Ontario general election
Party	Candidate	Votes	%	±%
Liberal	John Bailey Freeman	1,640	56.51	–1.03
Conservative	J. McKnight	1,262	43.49	+1.03
Total valid votes		2,902	99.38	
Total rejected ballots		18	0.62	–0.19
Turnout		2,920	70.14	+0.85
Eligible voters		4,163		
Liberal hold		Swing		–1.03
Source: Elections Ontario

1883 Ontario general election
Party	Candidate	Votes	%	±%
Liberal	John Bailey Freeman	1,633	57.54	+5.42
Conservative	William Wallace	1,205	42.46	–5.42
Total valid votes		2,838	99.20	
Total rejected ballots		23	0.80	+0.80
Turnout		2,861	69.29	–2.26
Eligible voters		4,129		
Liberal hold		Swing		+5.42
Source: Elections Ontario

1879 Ontario general election
Party	Candidate	Votes	%	±%
Liberal	John Bailey Freeman	1,490	52.12	−0.08
Conservative	James Wilson	1,369	47.88	+0.08
Total valid votes		2,859	71.55	−4.23
Eligible voters		3,996		
Liberal hold		Swing		−0.08
Source: Elections Ontario

1875 Ontario general election
Party	Candidate	Votes	%	±%
Liberal	John Fitzgerald Clarke	1,417	52.19	−4.59
Conservative	J. McKnight	1,298	47.81	+4.59
Total valid votes		2,715	75.77	+1.35
Eligible voters		3,583		
Liberal hold		Swing		−4.59
Source: Elections Ontario

1871 Ontario general election
Party	Candidate	Votes	%	±%
Liberal	John Fitzgerald Clarke	1,122	56.78	+6.83
Conservative	James Wilson	854	43.22	−6.83
Turnout		1,976	74.43	−9.41
Eligible voters		2,655		
Liberal gain from Conservative		Swing		+6.83
Source: Elections Ontario

1867 Ontario general election
Party	Candidate	Votes	%
Conservative	James Wilson	987	50.05
Liberal	M.H. Foley	985	49.95
Total valid votes		1,972	83.84
Eligible voters		2,352	
Conservative pickup new district.			
Source: Elections Ontario
