= Raymond Elmer Anderson =

Canadian politician

Member of Parliament for Norfolk
- In office 1949–1953
- Preceded by: Theobald Butler Barrett
- In office 1953–1957
- Succeeded by: John Evans Knowles

Personal details
- Born: July 7, 1891 Waterford, Ontario, Canada
- Died: August 6, 1970 (aged 79) Hagersville, Ontario
- Party: Liberal
- Spouse(s): Mrs. Hattie Anderson (daughter of Elijah Hellyer and Jeannette Pettit)
- Profession: Farmer and Entrepreneur

Raymond Elmer Anderson (July 7, 1891 – August 6, 1970) was a Canadian politician elected to the House of Commons of Canada in 1949 and 1953 as a member of the Liberal Party representing the riding of Norfolk. Anderson served as a member of parliament for 12 years. Anderson also ran as an independent for Norfolk in the elections of 1957 and 1958. Prior to his federal political career, he was elected as a councillor to Norfolk County, Ontario in 1930 and became reeve for Townsend Township, Ontario in 1932.

Anderson also served as the Chairman of the Ontario Berry and Vegetable Growers Marketing Board and was a founding member and manager of the Norfolk Berry Growers Association.

Anderson was the son of John Anderson II and Rhoda Churchill, also of Norfolk County and were United Empire Loyalists.
