= John Stuart (Canadian politician) =

Canadian politician

John Stuart (June 24, 1830 – September 15, 1913) was a Scottish-born wholesale grocer and political figure in Ontario. He represented Norfolk South in the House of Commons of Canada in 1874 as a Liberal member.

He was born in Keith, Banffshire, the son of James Stuart. He was educated there, worked as a clerk in a lawyer's office and came to Canada West in 1848, settling first in Toronto and then Hamilton in 1864. In 1856, he married Jane Jacques. In 1864, he established a wholesale grocery business in partnership with Alexander Harvey, the husband of his sister Margaret. Stuart was elected in the 1874 federal election; his election was overturned after an appeal and he was defeated by William Wallace in the by-election held in December 1874. Stuart was also vice-president of the Bank of Hamilton and a director of the Wellington, Bruce and Grey Railway. He also served as president of the Hamilton and North-Western Railway. Stuart died in Toronto at the age of 83.
