= William Wallace (Canadian politician) =

Canadian politician

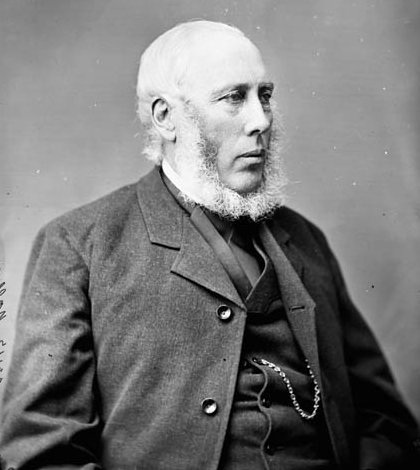

Member of the Canadian Parliament for Norfolk South
- In office 1872–1874
- Preceded by: Peter Lawson
- Succeeded by: John Stuart
- In office 1874–1882
- Preceded by: John Stuart
- Succeeded by: Joseph Jackson

Personal details
- Born: February 4, 1820 Galston, Ayrshire, Scotland
- Died: August 28, 1887 (aged 67) Simcoe, Ontario
- Party: Conservative

William Wallace (February 4, 1820 – August 28, 1887) was a Canadian journalist and political figure. He represented Norfolk South in the House of Commons of Canada from 1872 to 1882 as a Conservative member.

He was born near Galston, Ayrshire, Scotland, the son of John Wallace, and came to Canada around 1840. Wallace settled at Simcoe, Ontario and established a newspaper there, the British Canadian, as well as operating a printing business. He also opened a bookstore and occupied various posts associated with railways. Wallace served on the school board for Simcoe and also served as reeve, mayor and as a member of the council for Norfolk County. In 1852, he married Mary Ann Kent.

He did not run in the 1874 general election but won a by-election later that same year after the election was appealed. Wallace was defeated in 1882.

1872 Canadian federal election: South Riding of Norfolk
Party	Candidate	Votes
Conservative	William Wallace	1,208
Unknown	H. Killmaster	1,098
Source: Canadian Elections Database
