= Norfolk—Haldimand =

Former federal electoral district in Ontario, Canada

Coordinates: 42.85°N 80.29°W

Ontario electoral district

Defunct federal electoral district
- Legislature: House of Commons
- District created: 1966
- District abolished: 1976
- First contested: 1968
- Last contested: 1974

Norfolk—Haldimand was a federal electoral district represented in the House of Commons of Canada from 1968 to 1979. It was located in the province of Ontario. This riding was created in 1966 from parts of Brant—Haldimand and Norfolk ridings.

It consisted of the County of Norfolk (excluding the Town of Tillsonburg), and, in the County of Haldimand, the Village of Hagersville and the Townships of North Cayuga, South Cayuga, Oneida, Rainham, Seneca and Walpole (excluding parts lying within the Six Nations Indian Reserve No. 40 and New Credit Indian Reserve No. 40A).

The electoral district was abolished in 1976 when it was redistributed between Haldimand—Norfolk and Oxford ridings.

== Members of Parliament ==
This riding has elected the following members of Parliament:

Parliament	Years	Member	Party
Riding created from Norfolk and Brant—Haldimand
28th	1968–1972	William David Knowles	Progressive Conservative
29th	1972–1974	William David Knowles	Progressive Conservative
30th	1974–1979	William David Knowles	Progressive Conservative
Riding dissolved into Haldimand—Norfolk and Oxford

== Election results ==
1968 Canadian federal election: Norfolk—Haldimand
Party	Candidate	Votes
Progressive Conservative	William David Knowles	14,908
Liberal	Jack Roxburgh	13,132
New Democratic	Lois M. Stuart	3,441

1972 Canadian federal election: Norfolk—Haldimand
Party	Candidate	Votes
Progressive Conservative	William David Knowles	21,214
Liberal	David Marshall	14,106
New Democratic	Ede Pos	3,116
Social Credit	Dave Mallory	339

1974 Canadian federal election: Norfolk—Haldimand
Party	Candidate	Votes
Progressive Conservative	William David Knowles	17,867
Liberal	David Marshall	15,604
New Democratic	Norm Walpole	3,426

== See also ==
- List of Canadian electoral districts
- Historical federal electoral districts of Canada
