= Joseph Cridland =

Canadian politician from Ontario

Member of the Ontario Provincial Parliament for Norfolk South
- In office October 20, 1919 – May 10, 1923
- Preceded by: Arthur Clarence Pratt
- Succeeded by: John Strickler Martin

Personal details
- Party: United Farmers

Joseph Cridland was a Canadian politician from Ontario. He represented Norfolk South in the Legislative Assembly of Ontario from 1919 to 1923.

== See also ==
- 15th Parliament of Ontario
