= John Fitzgerald Clarke =

Canadian politician and physician

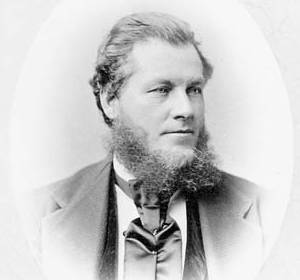

Ontario MPP
- In office 1871–1879
- Preceded by: James Wilson
- Succeeded by: John Bailey Freeman
- Constituency: Norfolk North

Personal details
- Born: July 16, 1827 Coventry, England
- Died: April 19, 1887 (aged 59) Thunder Bay, Ontario
- Party: Liberal
- Occupation: Physician

John Fitzgerald Clarke (July 16, 1827 – April 19, 1887) was an Ontario medical doctor and political figure. He represented Norfolk North in the Legislative Assembly of Ontario from 1871 to 1879.

He was born in Coventry, England in 1827, the son of a Congregational minister who was sent to Upper Canada as a missionary in 1837. He studied medicine at McGill College and settled in Vittoria. He moved to Simcoe in 1851. He served on the town council and was the coroner for Norfolk County from 1848 to 1870. Clarke was editor and owner of the Long Point Advocate. He was later named sheriff for Thunder Bay District and moved to Port Arthur (later part of the city of Thunder Bay), where he died in 1887.

His brother William Fletcher Clarke (1824–1902) was a minister and journalist.

== Electoral history ==
1871 Ontario general election: Norfolk North
Party	Candidate	Votes	%	±%
Liberal	John Fitzgerald Clarke	1,122	56.78	+6.83
Conservative	James Wilson	854	43.22	−6.83
Turnout		1,976	74.43	−9.41
Eligible voters		2,655		
Liberal gain from Conservative		Swing		+6.83
Source: Elections Ontario

1875 Ontario general election: Norfolk North
Party	Candidate	Votes	%	±%
Liberal	John Fitzgerald Clarke	1,417	52.19	−4.59
Conservative	J. McKnight	1,298	47.81	+4.59
Total valid votes		2,715	75.77	+1.35
Eligible voters		3,583		
Liberal hold		Swing		−4.59
Source: Elections Ontario
