= Theobald Butler Barrett =

Canadian politician (1894–1969)

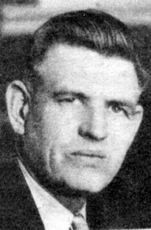

Member of the Canadian Parliament for Norfolk
- In office 1945–1949
- Preceded by: William Horace Taylor
- Succeeded by: Raymond Elmer Anderson

Personal details
- Born: July 24, 1894 Armstrong, British Columbia, Canada
- Died: March 26, 1969 (aged 74) Port Dover, Ontario, Canada
- Party: Progressive Conservative
- Occupation: farmer

Theobald Butler Barrett (July 24, 1894 – March 26, 1969) was a Canadian politician. He was elected to the House of Commons of Canada in 1945 as a Member of the Progressive Conservative Party of Canada to represent the riding of Norfolk. He was defeated in the 1949 election. Prior to his federal political experience, he was a Lieutenant in the Royal Canadian Artillery between 1942 and 1943.

Barrett was the grandfather of Toby Barrett, Member of the Ontario Provincial Parliament for Haldimand—Norfolk from 1995 to 2022.
