= James Wilson (Ontario MPP) =

Preacher and politician in Ontario, Canada (1810–1891)

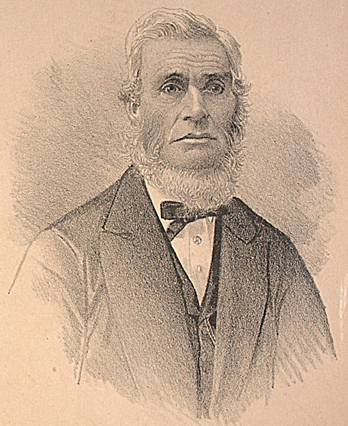

Ontario MPP
- In office 1867–1871
- Preceded by: Riding established
- Succeeded by: John Fitzgerald Clarke
- Constituency: Norfolk North

Personal details
- Born: December 14, 1810; Carlow, Ireland
- Died: May 14, 1891 (aged 80); Brantford, Ontario
- Political party: Conservative
- Spouse: Susanna Shaver (m. 1832)
- Occupation: Preacher

James Wilson (December 14, 1810 – May 14, 1891) was an Irish-born farmer, Methodist preacher and political figure in Ontario. He represented Norfolk North in the Legislative Assembly of Ontario from 1867 to 1871 as a Conservative member.

He was born in Carlow in Ireland, the son of a Methodist preacher who came to Upper Canada in 1817. In 1832, he married Susanna Shaver. Wilson settled in Chinguacousy Township, moving to Townsend Township three years later. In 1846, Wilson built a steam-powered sawmill. He served on the township council for Townsend, also serving as deputy reeve. Wilson was defeated by John Fitzgerald Clarke when he ran for reelection to the assembly in 1871. He died in 1891 and was buried at Wilsonville Cemetery in Townsend Township.

== Electoral history ==
1867 Ontario general election: Norfolk North
| Party | Candidate | Votes | % |
|---|---|---|---|
| Conservative | James Wilson | 987 | 50.05 |
| Liberal | M.H. Foley | 985 | 49.95 |
| Total valid votes | | 1,972 | 83.84 |
| Eligible voters | | 2,352 | |
| Conservative pickup new district. | | | |
Source: Elections Ontario

1871 Ontario general election: Norfolk North
| Party | Candidate | Votes | % | ±% |
|---|---|---|---|---|
| Liberal | John Fitzgerald Clarke | 1,122 | 56.78 | +6.83 |
| Conservative | James Wilson | 854 | 43.22 | −6.83 |
| Turnout | | 1,976 | 74.43 | −9.41 |
| Eligible voters | | 2,655 | | |
| Liberal gain from Conservative | | Swing | | +6.83 |
Source: Elections Ontario

1871 Ontario general election: Norfolk South
| Party | Candidate | Votes | % | ±% |
|---|---|---|---|---|
| Liberal | Simpson McCall | 1,009 | 53.30 | +2.84 |
| Conservative | James Wilson | 884 | 46.70 | −2.84 |
| Turnout | | 1,893 | 71.73 | −6.33 |
| Eligible voters | | 2,639 | | |
| Liberal hold | | Swing | | +2.84 |
Source: Elections Ontario

1879 Ontario general election: Norfolk North
| Party | Candidate | Votes | % | ±% |
|---|---|---|---|---|
| Liberal | John Bailey Freeman | 1,490 | 52.12 | −0.08 |
| Conservative | James Wilson | 1,369 | 47.88 | +0.08 |
| Total valid votes | | 2,859 | 71.55 | −4.23 |
| Eligible voters | | 3,996 | | |
| Liberal hold | | Swing | | −0.08 |
Source: Elections Ontario
