= William David Knowles =

Canadian politician

Member of Parliament for Norfolk—Haldimand
- In office 25 June 1968 – 21 March 1979
- Preceded by: Jack Roxburgh
- Succeeded by: District abolished

Personal details
- Born: 16 February 1908 Langton, Ontario, Canada
- Died: 23 November 2000 (aged 92)
- Party: Progressive Conservative
- Profession: Teacher

William David Knowles (16 February 1908 – 23 November 2000) was a Progressive Conservative party member of the House of Commons of Canada. He was born in Langton, Ontario and became a teacher by career.

He was first elected at the Norfolk—Haldimand riding in the 1968 general election, defeating Jack Roxburgh. He was re-elected there in the 1972 and 1974 federal elections and completed his term in the 30th Parliament before leaving federal political office.
