= Simpson McCall =

Canadian politician

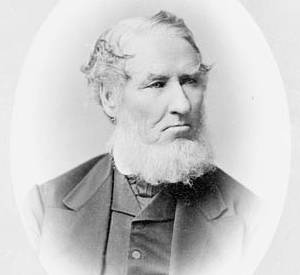

Ontario MPP
- In office 1867–1874
- Preceded by: Riding established
- Succeeded by: Richard Richardson
- Constituency: Norfolk South

Personal details
- Born: December 5, 1807 Vittoria, Ontario
- Died: April 25, 1899 (aged 91) Vittoria, Ontario
- Party: Liberal
- Spouse: Priscilla Lamport (m. 1835)
- Children: 6
- Occupation: Merchant

Simpson Grant McCall (December 5, 1807 – April 25, 1899) was an Ontario farmer, businessman and political figure. He represented Norfolk South in the Legislative Assembly of Ontario from 1867 to 1874.

He was born in Victoria in Norfolk County, Upper Canada in 1807. He owned a general store and was postmaster at Vittoria from 1834 to 1868. He was named justice of the peace in 1845. He served on the District and County councils from 1847 to 1864.

== Electoral history ==
1867 Ontario general election: Norfolk South
Party	Candidate	Votes	%
Liberal	Simpson McCall	975	50.47
Conservative	R. Crysler	957	49.53
Total valid votes		1,932	78.06
Eligible voters		2,475	
Liberal pickup new district.			
Source: Elections Ontario

1871 Ontario general election: Norfolk South
Party	Candidate	Votes	%	±%
Liberal	Simpson McCall	1,009	53.30	+2.84
Conservative	James Wilson	884	46.70	−2.84
Turnout		1,893	71.73	−6.33
Eligible voters		2,639		
Liberal hold		Swing		+2.84
Source: Elections Ontario

1875 Ontario general election: Norfolk South
Party	Candidate	Votes	%	±%
Conservative	Richard Richardson	1,293	58.27	+11.57
Independent	Simpson McCall	926	41.73	−11.57
Total valid votes		2,219	64.71	−7.02
Eligible voters		3,429		
Conservative gain from Liberal		Swing		+11.57
Source: Elections Ontario
