= William Morgan (Canadian politician) =

Ontario MPP
- In office 1879–1890
- Preceded by: Richard Richardson
- Succeeded by: William Andrew Charlton
- Constituency: Norfolk South

Personal details
- Born: December 8, 1848 Stirling, Hastings County, Canada West
- Died: January 18, 1903 (aged 54)
- Party: Conservative
- Occupation: Businessman

William Morgan (December 8, 1848 – January 18, 1903) was an Ontario businessman and political figure. He represented Norfolk South in the Legislative Assembly of Ontario from 1879 to 1890 as a Conservative member.

He was born in Stirling, Hastings County, Canada West in 1848, the son of John Dwyer Morgan who came to Upper Canada from Wales. He entered business as a merchant in Walsingham Centre, moving for a while to Port Rowan before returning. In 1882, he began manufacturing paints. Morgan served as reeve for Walsingham Township. He also commanded a militia battalion and was a member of the local Freemason lodge. Morgan was an agent for a telegraph company and served as postmaster.

== Electoral history ==
1879 Ontario general election: Norfolk South
Party	Candidate	Votes	%	±%
Conservative	William Morgan	1,386	50.36	−7.91
Liberal	Mr. Austin	1,366	49.64	
Total valid votes		2,752	76.23	+11.52
Eligible voters		3,610		
Conservative hold		Swing		−7.91
Source: Elections Ontario
