= Richard Richardson (Canadian politician) =

Canadian politician

Ontario MPP
- In office 1875–1879
- Preceded by: Simpson McCall
- Succeeded by: William Morgan
- Constituency: Norfolk South

Personal details
- Born: June 23, 1820 Lincoln, Lincolnshire, England
- Party: Conservative

Richard Richardson (June 23, 1820 – January 8, 1885) was an Ontario political figure. He represented Norfolk South in the Legislative Assembly of Ontario from 1875 to 1879 as a Conservative member.

He was born in Lincoln, Lincolnshire, England in 1820, the son of Richard Richardson. In 1844, he married Louisa Munro. Richardson served as reeve for Walsingham Township. He was captain in the local militia.

== Electoral history ==
1875 Ontario general election: Norfolk South
Party	Candidate	Votes	%	±%
Conservative	Richard Richardson	1,293	58.27	+11.57
Independent	Simpson McCall	926	41.73	−11.57
Total valid votes		2,219	64.71	−7.02
Eligible voters		3,429		
Conservative gain from Liberal		Swing		+11.57
Source: Elections Ontario
