= Bill Hanley (ice hockey) =

Canadian ice hockey administrator (1915–1990)

Bill Hanley

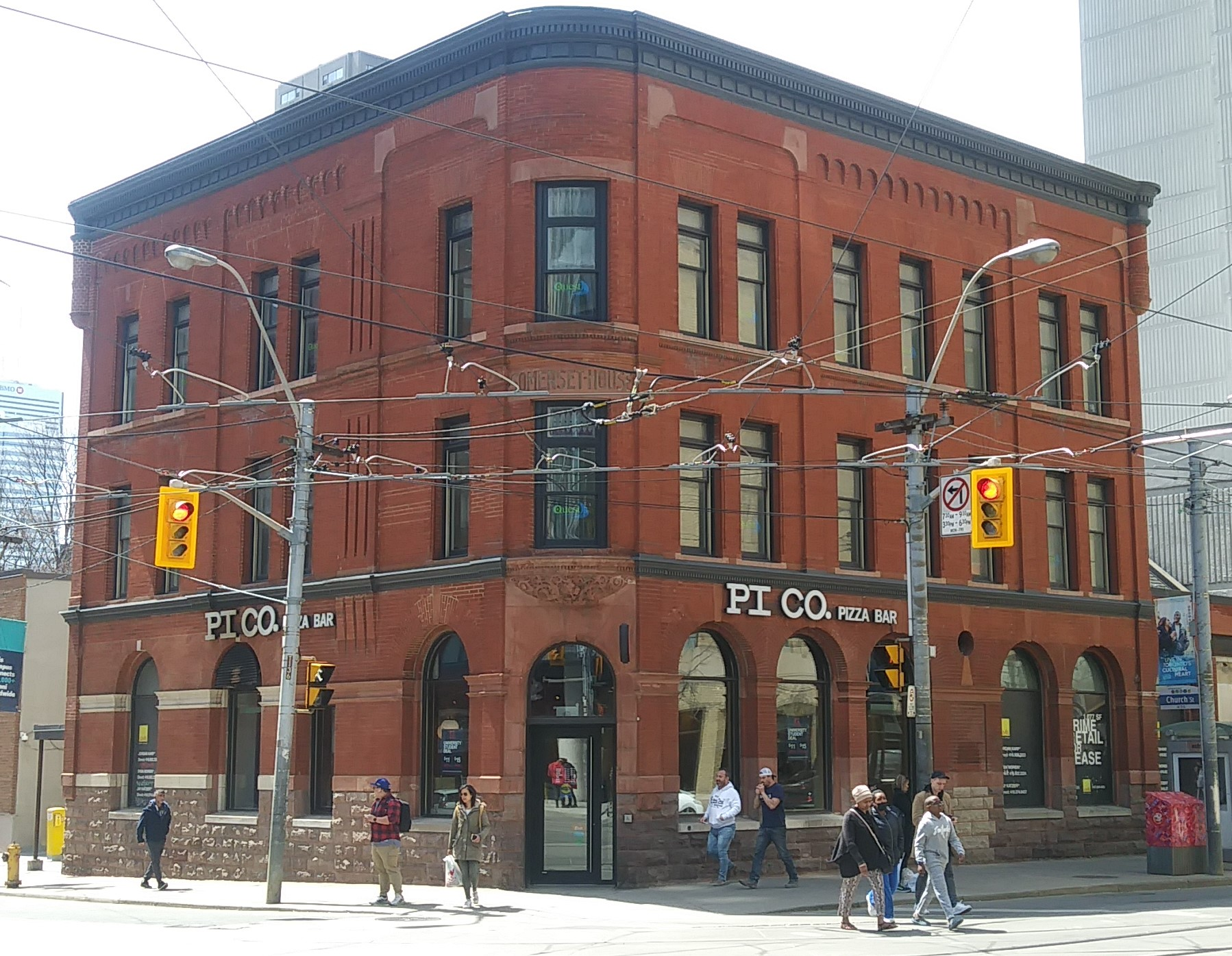
The Ontario Hockey Association offices were located in Somerset House, upstairs from a Canadian Bank of Commerce branch at 51 Carlton Street in Toronto.

William Hanley (February 28, 1915 – September 17, 1990) was a Canadian ice hockey administrator inducted into the builder category of the Hockey Hall of Fame.

== Early life ==
Hanley was born in the village of Ballyeaston when his mother was visiting what is now Northern Ireland, and he returned to Canada when he was only a few weeks old and grew up in Toronto. During high school, Hanley played on the Oakwood Collegiate Institute hockey team. After high school, Hanley attended the Ontario Agricultural College, and later worked on his parents' farm. Hanley joined the Royal Canadian Navy during World War II, and also served with Conn Smythe's 30th Battery that was part of the 7th Toronto Regiment, RCA.

== Ice hockey career ==
His career in hockey started as a timekeeper for the Toronto Marlboros games at Maple Leaf Gardens and eventually assumed the same responsibilities for the Toronto Maple Leafs. In 1951, Ontario Hockey Association president Jack Roxburgh hired Hanley as business manager, a position he retained until 1973. When W. A. Hewitt retired in 1966, Hanley also assumed the position of secretary-manager. When Hanley retired in 1973, he was succeeded by David Branch.

Hanley received the OHA Gold Stick Award in 1965. He was inducted into the Hockey Hall of Fame in 1986 into the builder's category. The Ontario Hockey League named the William Hanley Trophy in his honour, awarded annually to the most sportsmanlike player in the league.
