= Evans Knowles =

Canadian politician

John Evans Knowles

Member of Parliament for Norfolk
- In office 10 June 1957 – 17 June 1962
- Preceded by: Raymond Elmer Anderson
- Succeeded by: Jack Roxburgh

Personal details
- Born: 30 November 1914 North Walsingham Township, Ontario
- Died: 18 December 2011 (aged 97) Simcoe, Ontario
- Party: Progressive Conservative
- Profession: Farmer

John Evans Knowles (30 November 1914 – 18 December 2011) was a Progressive Conservative party member of the House of Commons of Canada. Born in North Walsingham Township, Ontario, he was a farmer by career.

He was first elected at the Norfolk riding in the 1957 general election and re-elected for second term in the 1958 election. In the 1962 election, Knowles was defeated by Jack Roxburgh of the Liberal party. Knowles was also unsuccessful in unseating Roxburgh in the 1963 and 1965 elections.

Knowles remained active in late 2008, providing comment to local media on that year's federal election. He died after a short illness in 2011.
