= Robin Shulman =

- Education: Columbia University (BA); University of California, Berkeley; New York University
- Occupations: Writer, reporter

Robin Shulman is a New York City-based writer and reporter. Crown/Random House published her first book, Eat the City, on July 10, 2012. She grew up in the communities of Waterford and Brantford in Ontario, Canada. Her work has appeared in The New York Times, The Washington Post, Slate Magazine, the San Francisco Chronicle, The Guardian and many other publications.

== Early years ==
Shulman grew up in Waterford, Brantford, and Toronto, Ontario, and graduated from high school in Benicia, California.

== Education ==
Shulman studied English at Columbia University, and became interested in community gardens in New York City. She graduated from Columbia in 1996 and then attended graduate school in journalism at University of California, Berkeley and in Middle East Studies at New York University. She was a finalist for the Livingston Award for Young Journalists for a story reported during journalism school on the construction of the barrier between Israel and the West Bank.

== Eat the City ==
Eat the City received strong praise in its early reviews. Annia Ciezadlo, author of Day of Honey, called the book "A profound, surprising, and exquisitely written exploration of how food and its makers, even in the unlikeliest places, keep all of us human". Alice Waters said “Through her personal stories, she convinces us that in order to live and eat in a city, we must understand where our food comes from and how it is made." Tracie McMillan, author of The American Way of Eating, said, "With beautiful detail, Shulman tells the tale of a city, however rich or poor, that has always wanted to eat well."

Both The New York Times and The Wall Street Journal raved about the book. In the Sunday Book Review, the Times wrote, "She discovered ‘an unseen city of thriving food production,’ hiding not only deep in the boroughs but also buried in the archives."

"The author, a former reporter for the Washington Post, has employed her skills as a writer and journalist to pull off a rather impressive feat: She has used food to chart the city’s evolution, and to argue that it owes its greatness as an international crossroads, particularly in its early years, as much to food as to industry or culture," wrote Ralph Gardner Jr. in the Wall Street Journal.

Klancy Miller for Food Republic wrote: "If you love New York City and food — especially meat, honey, vegetables, sugar, beer, fish and wine —you will be riveted by Eat the City: A Tale of the Fishers, Foragers, Butchers, Farmers, Poultry Minders, Sugar Refiners, Cane Cutters, Bee Keepers, Winemakers, and Brewers Who Built New York. The book is beautifully written and skillfully reported by Robin Shulman and tells the present and past story of people who produce, grow, hunt and butcher their food in New York."

Shulman 'fan-sources' her public appearances via Togather.com - a tool which allows readers to bring her to speak in their town based on book sales.
