= Edwin Clarendon Carpenter =

Canadian politician

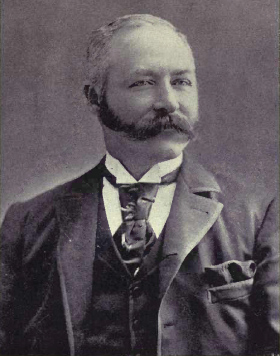

Ontario MPP
- In office 1890–1902
- Preceded by: John Bailey Freeman
- Succeeded by: Frederick Snider
- Constituency: Norfolk North

Personal details
- Born: December 15, 1845 Townsend Township, Norfolk County, Canada West
- Died: March 2, 1920 (aged 74) Rochester Township, Ontario
- Party: Liberal
- Occupation: Farmer

Edwin Clarendon Carpenter (December 15, 1845 – March 2, 1920) was an Ontario farmer and political figure. He represented Norfolk North in the Legislative Assembly of Ontario as a Liberal member from 1891 to 1902.

He was born in Townsend Township, Norfolk County, Canada West in 1845, the son of John B. Carpenter who had come to Upper Canada from New Jersey. Carpenter attended Victoria University in Cobourg. He served several years as deputy reeve for Townsend. He was elected to the provincial assembly in an 1891 by-election held after the death of John Bailey Freeman. He died March 2, 1920.
