= Jack Roxburgh =

Canadian ice hockey administrator and politician (1901–1975)

Member of Parliament for Norfolk
- In office June 1962 – April 1968
- Preceded by: John Evans Knowles
- Succeeded by: William David Knowles

Personal details
- Born: John Maxwell Roxburgh; February 14, 1901 Phoenix, Arizona Territory, U.S.
- Died: February 27, 1975 (aged 74) Venice, Florida, U.S.
- Party: Liberal Party of Canada
- Education: Ontario Agricultural College
- Occupation: Farmer
- Known for: Canadian Amateur Hockey Association; Ontario Hockey Association; Ontario Minor Hockey Association

John Maxwell Roxburgh (February 14, 1901 – February 27, 1975) was a Canadian ice hockey administrator and politician. He organized minor ice hockey in his hometown of Simcoe, Ontario, co-founded the Ontario Juvenile Hockey Association in 1934, and the Ontario Minor Hockey Association in 1940. He served as president of the Ontario Hockey Association from 1950 to 1952, improved its finances to become profitable, and appointed Bill Hanley as a full-time manager to operate the association as a business. Roxburgh served as president of the Canadian Amateur Hockey Association from 1960 to 1962, arranged exhibition games between Canada and the Soviet Union amid an increased rivalry between the respective national teams, and pushed for the separation of politics and sport when the Cold War threatened to cancel the 1962 Ice Hockey World Championships. He was opposed to changes in the Olympic Oath and the international definition of amateurism, and later recommended the formation of a student-athlete team coached by Father David Bauer to become the Canada men's national ice hockey team.

Roxburgh graduated from Ontario Agricultural College and farmed before he venturing into municipal and federal politics. He served as a Liberal Party of Canada member of the House of Commons of Canada for the Norfolk electoral district from 1962 to 1968. He was elected three times, defended the Canadian tobacco industry, pushed for university students registering as voters, and lobbied for increased grants to promote physical fitness in Canada. During the Great Canadian Flag Debate of 1964, Roxburgh introduced legislation to declare ice hockey as the national game of Canada after he disproved the myth that lacrosse held the distinction. He was a life member of multiple hockey organizations and received the Order of Merit from the Canadian Amateur Hockey Association. He died from injuries sustained in a boating accident, and was posthumously inducted into the Norfolk County Sports Hall of Recognition.

== Early life ==
John Maxwell Roxburgh was born on February 14, 1901, in Phoenix. His family was temporarily living in the Arizona Territory, until his parents relocated the family to Cache Bay, Ontario while Roxburgh was a youth. He attended secondary school in Sturgeon Falls, Ontario. He graduated from Ontario Agricultural College in Guelph in 1926, with a degree in horticulture, and played on ice hockey and rugby teams in college.

Roxburgh worked at a cannery in Wellington County, Ontario, for a year, then relocated to Norfolk County, Ontario, in 1928. He worked for a year at the Government of Ontario's turkey farm, near Turkey Point, Ontario. In 1929, he purchased a farm in Woodhouse Township, and began breeding a flock of 1700 turkeys which won prizes at the Royal Agricultural Winter Fair and the 1933 Chicago World's Fair.

During the 1930s, he served as president of the Ontario Turkey Breeders Association for three years, operated a life insurance business, and served as a Woodhouse Township Council member and deputy reeve. By 1941, he began cultivating orchards of cherries, apples, peaches and strawberries, and served as secretary of the Norfolk Federation of Agriculture.

== Ontario hockey career ==
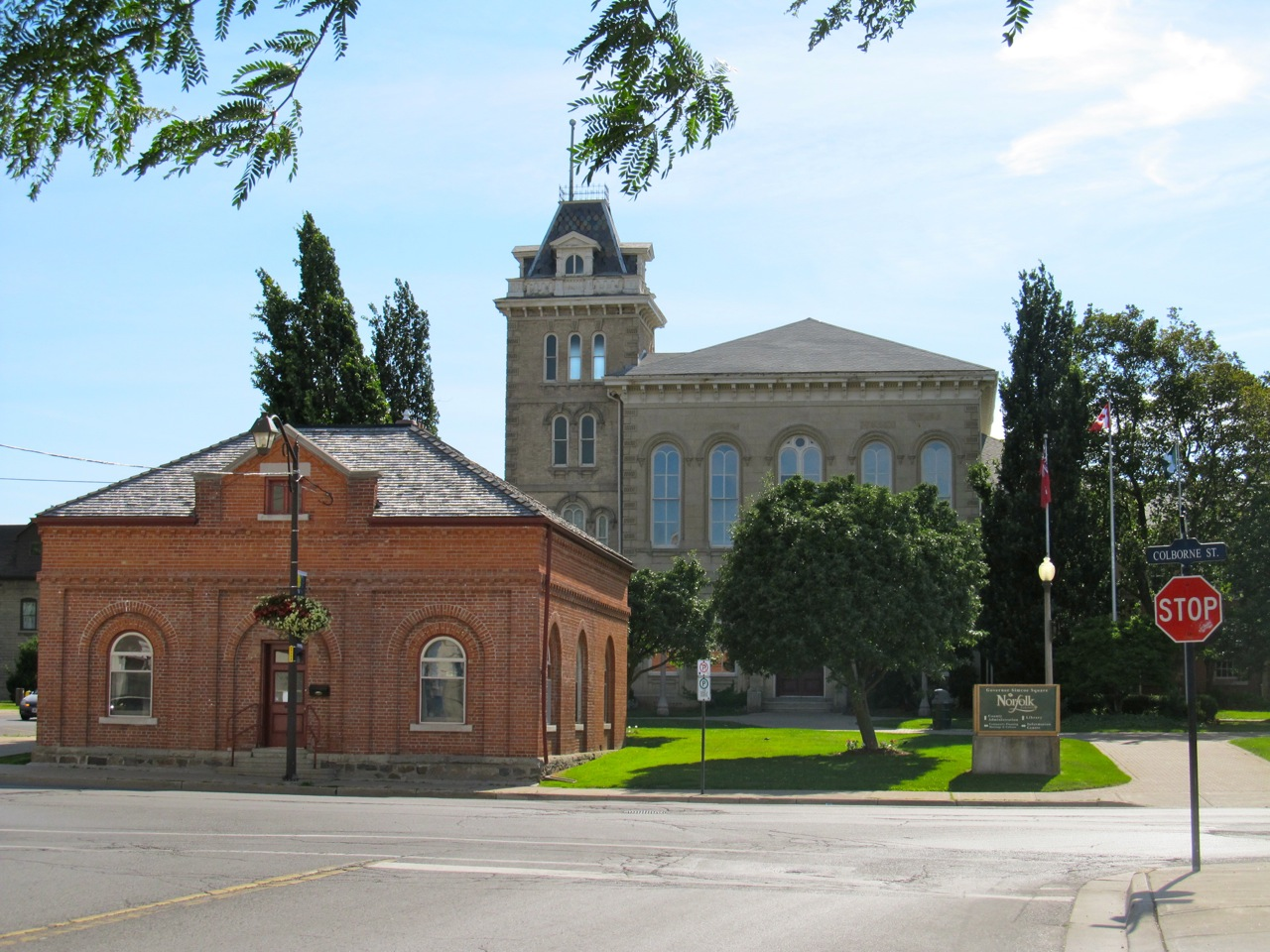
Governor Simcoe Square and the Norfolk County offices in Simcoe

Roxburgh assisted in organizing a Sunday school league in 1934, in Simcoe, Ontario. Later that year, Roxburgh and Roger Matchett organized the Ontario Juvenile Hockey Association (OJHA) in southwestern Ontario, and Roxburgh volunteered to manage and coach of the Simcoe juveniles team. He served as secretary-treasurer of the OJHA from 1934 to 1936, and then as its president from 1936 to 1938. His team evolved into the Tiger Cub Juveniles, then was later known as Roxy's Reformer Cubs. The team's players were chosen from the Sunday school league, and reached the Ontario Hockey Association (OHA) junior ice hockey semifinals during the 1937–38 season.

Roxburgh's OJHA operated with four teams, and he sought to increase the numbers of teams and competition level. He arranged games with the Ontario Midget and Bantam Hockey Association based in St. Catharines, Ontario. Roxburgh was involved in negotiations for the two organizations to merge, founding the Ontario Minor Hockey Association (OMHA) on November 30, 1940. The new league began its first season with eight teams, and Roxburgh convinced the new OMHA to sign an affiliation agreement with the OHA in 1940.

Roxburgh later became a convenor and an executive within the OHA, then served as OHA president from 1950 to 1952. Historian and writer Scott Young credited Roxburgh for being an astute businessman and improving the OHA's finances by increasing profits from the playoffs in junior ice hockey. In 1951, Roxburgh appointed Bill Hanley to become the full-time manager of the OHA to assist in running the association as a business.

In 1951, the OHA was faced with a mutiny in the senior ice hockey ranks in Kingston, Ontario. After an inquiry, Roxburgh and fellow OHA executives George Dudley, Frank Buckland and W. A. Hewitt, handed out a lifetime suspension to George Patterson who coached Kingston's senior B-level team, for conspiring to deliberately lose a playoff series to avoid moving into a higher-level of playoffs, rather than staying in a lower level and potentially make more profits at home playoff games than on the road.

Roxburgh was succeeded as OHA president by S. E. McTavish, and later represented the OHA at the national level as its past president.

== CAHA vice-president ==
Roxburgh was elected second vice-president of the Canadian Amateur Hockey Association (CAHA) on May 30, 1957, and served in the role for two years until 1959. He chaired the minor ice hockey committee which organized Minor Hockey Week in Canada in 1958 and 1959, and oversaw scheduling at the 1959 Memorial Cup.

He was elected first vice-president of the CAHA in 1959. He remained chairman of the minor hockey committee, and reported at the 1959 annual general meeting that minor hockey registrations had increased by 2700 players from the previous season. He remained in charge of scheduling for the 1960 Memorial Cup playoffs, and directed the referees to be tougher on physical play and stick-swinging in the 1960 finals, due to aggressive and dangerous play.

== CAHA president ==
=== First term ===
The Memorial Cup was the championship trophy for amateur junior ice hockey overseen by the CAHA.

Roxburgh was elected CAHA president on May 28, 1960, at the annual general meeting in Sydney, Nova Scotia, and succeeded Gordon Juckes, who had stepped down as president to be appointed a full-time secretary and employee of the CAHA. Roxburgh was subsequently elected a director of the Amateur Hockey Association of the United States (AHAUS) later in 1960. As CAHA president, Roxburgh arranged exhibition games between Canada and the Soviet Union, and represented the CAHA at the International Ice Hockey Federation (IIHF).

Roxburgh and fellow CAHA executives were tasked with choosing which club would represent the Canada men's national ice hockey team at the Ice Hockey World Championships and in ice hockey at the Olympic Games. The CAHA felt that the Winnipeg Maroons were Canada's strongest team to win the 1961 Ice Hockey World Championships, but the Maroons could not play a three-week exhibition tour in Switzerland due to work commitments. Roxburgh later announced the Trail Smoke Eaters were chosen to represent Canada, and would participate in a profitable exhibition tour. He also admitted that Soviet teams were faster and stronger than before, and that Canada needed to improve to win against them in the World Championships.

Roxburgh travelled with Trail on the exhibition tour of Europe, and felt they were a balanced team that could play physical hockey. After games with in Sweden, Herman Carlsson of the Swedish Ice Hockey Association said that Canadian players were intent on injuring Sweden's best players in advance of the 1961 World Championships. Roxburgh responded by calling the Swedish players weak, and offered to arrange to a trip to Canada where Sweden could learn how to play hockey. The tour continued into the Soviet Union, and after Trail lost to HC Dynamo Moscow by a 3–2 score, Roxburgh said, "the Russians have come a long way and are able to give and take body checks just as we do". He told reporters in Czechoslovakia that either Canada or the Soviet Union national ice hockey team would win the gold medal at the 1961 World Championship. His prediction proved correct when Canada won the gold medal over the Czechoslovakia men's national ice hockey team. Roxburgh chose to share profits from the television rights of the exhibition series with members of the Trail Smoke Eaters, after it was mistakenly reported that the team would get a share of the profits instead of just the CAHA retaining the profits. After the tour completed, Roxburgh stated he was opposed to more exhibition games in Sweden in the upcoming winter season due to issues regarding physical play, and didn't want to risk more problems.

At the 1961 CAHA annual general meeting in Port Arthur, Ontario, Roxburgh stated that the recent Memorial Cup and Allan Cups were the more financially successful in recent times. Delegates to the meeting pushed for more say about rules of play on the joint committee with the National Hockey League (NHL) and other professional leagues. Roxburgh challenged delegates to choose a consistent refereeing system to be used in national playoffs. Until then, the playoff format had been an executive choice, lacking consistency across the nation. Delegates voted to have one referee and two linesmen at all games, as opposed to two referees without linesmen.

=== Second term ===
Roxburgh was reelected CAHA president on May 26, 1961. In August 1961, the OHA's junior division was reduced to only five teams when the Toronto area teams formed the Metro Junior A League. OHA president Lloyd Pollock applied to the CAHA to permit the Montreal Junior Canadiens from the Quebec Amateur Hockey Association to play in the OHA as its sixth team. Roxburgh denied the request, stating that CAHA rules do not allow en masse transfers between provincial associations. The Canadiens transfer to the OHA's junior division was later approved when the CAHA branch presidents voted in its favour.

In September 1961, Earl Dawson of the Manitoba Amateur Hockey Association sought approval for the Manitoba Junior Hockey League to use international ice hockey rules, Roxburgh approved of the change and was quoted as saying that "certain formalities had to be taken care of". Also in September 1961, the Hockey Hall of Fame opened in Toronto. Roxburgh felt that there was no place for two halls of fame in Canada, referring to the Original Hockey Hall of Fame which had yet to be built in Kingston, Ontario, and stated it was a "tragedy nothing was done" while James T. Sutherland was alive. The CAHA formally withdrew its support of Kingston in January 1962, in favour of Toronto.

==== 1962 Ice Hockey World Championships ====
In the international game, Roxburgh nominated Vic Lindquist to represent Canada as a referee at the 1962 Ice Hockey World Championships, and that the Galt Terriers were chosen to represent Canada at the World Championships. Roxburgh stated the CAHA had dropped out of the bid to host the 1962 World Championships when AHAUS proposed to subsidize the cost for European teams to travel to Colorado. An exhibition tour was approved for the Trail Smoke Eaters, and Roxburgh accompanied the team to Europe. The CAHA considered sending a team to a junior World Championships in Prague, but later declined to send a team.

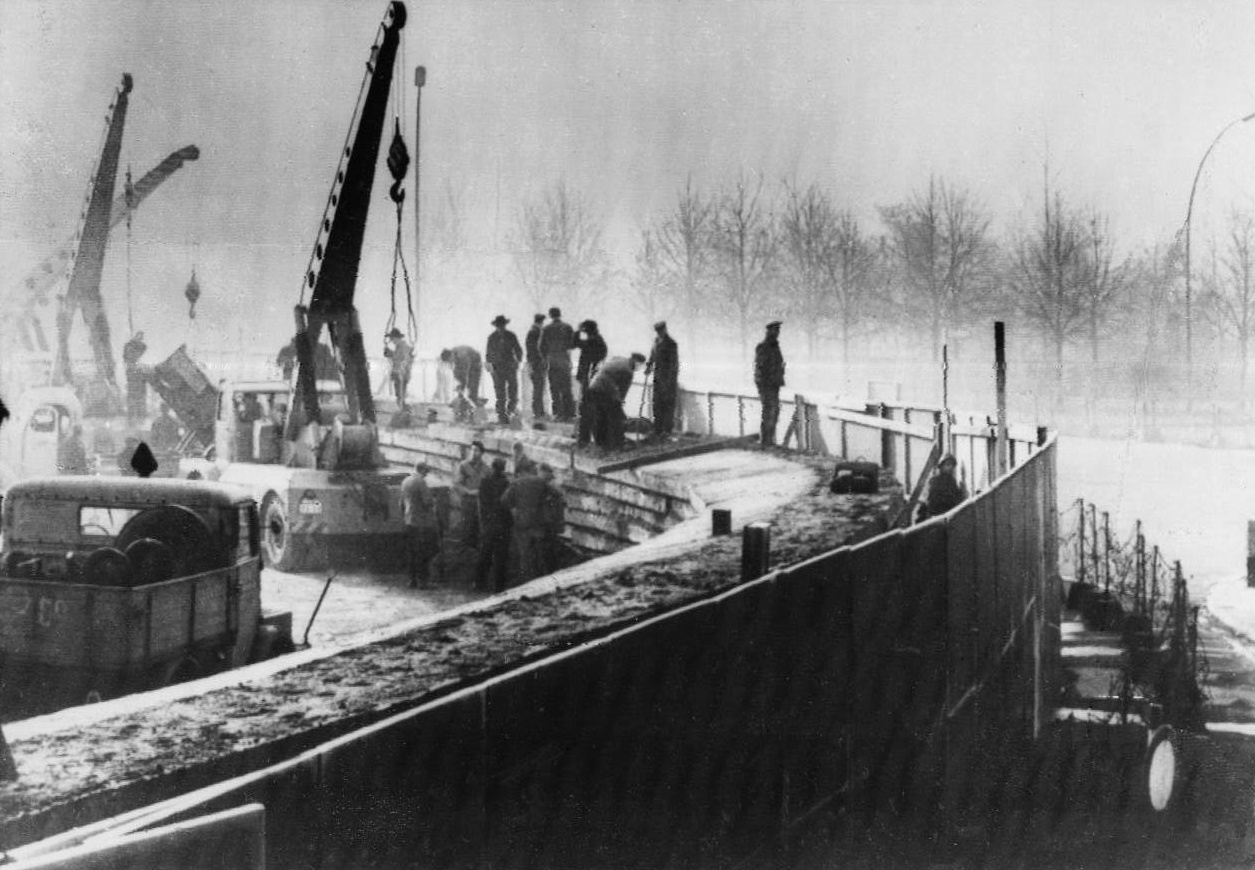
Construction of the Berlin Wall

The 1962 Ice Hockey World Championships were scheduled to be hosted in Colorado Springs, Colorado, but the event was placed in jeopardy due to the political situation in Europe. When the Berlin Wall was constructed in 1961, NATO responded with travel restrictions which prevented the East Germany national ice hockey team from attending the World Championships. Roxburgh felt that politics should not affect sports, and the decision went against the goodwill and relations established by Canadian teams travelling behind the Iron Curtain. He called for the IIHF to unite in opposition to the NATO decision.

Roxburgh was committed to Canada playing in the event, and stated that he would do anything in his power to keep it alive. He sent a cable to Czechoslovak officials urging for their team to participate, and not boycott due to East German travel issues. He appealed to Prime Minister of Canada John Diefenbaker, and Secretary of State for External Affairs of Canada, Howard Charles Green to pressure on NATO on its decision, but both declined to be involved. Teams from the Soviet Union and other communist countries ultimately chose to withdraw in protest of the NATO decision.

The CAHA went ahead with the Galt Terriers North American tour, and hoped to benefit from ticket sales at exhibition games. Roxburgh travelled with the team, even though he failed to secure extra funding from Kenneth Farmer and the National Advisory Council on Fitness and Amateur Sport. Canada placed second overall at the World Championships, due to a 5–3 loss to the Sweden men's national ice hockey team. Roxburgh defended the choice of the Galt as Canada's representative, and stated that the team was just as good as the Trail Smoke Eaters, but was disappointed by the number of penalties Galt took against Sweden. Despite the disappointing result, he announced that exhibition tours for the following season were already being planned. After the Trail Smoke Eaters won the 1962 Allan Cup, the team was approved to represent Canada at the 1963 World Ice Hockey Championships, and Roxburgh requested permission to let the CAHA executive chose a replacement team if necessary.

==== 1962 Memorial Cup ====
In April 1962, Roxburgh announced the schedule for the 1962 Memorial Cup between the Hamilton Red Wings and the Edmonton Oil Kings, with all games played at Maple Leaf Gardens and broadcast by CFTO-TV. The CAHA was threatened with legal action by K.D. Soble who owned both the Red Wings and CHCH-TV in Hamilton, Ontario, if the CAHA did not share the broadcast profits. The dispute was resolved with games moved to the Hamilton Forum, Guelph and Kitchener, Ontario. CFTO would no longer broadcast the series, and CHCH would cover all games. Roxburgh reaffirmed that the CAHA controlled broadcast rights for its games, and not the individual arenas. As a result of the change, the teams received a share of the television revenue. In May, the CAHA approved a recommendation by Roxburgh to set up a committee to explore balanced competition in the Memorial Cup playoffs in the wake of regional disparities across Canada.

==== Canada men's national ice hockey team debate ====
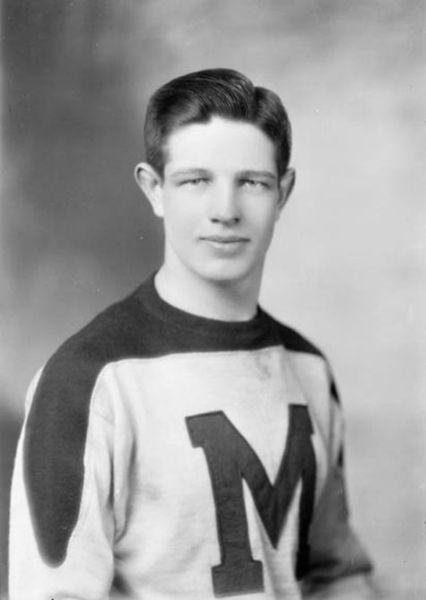
David Bauer in 1944

At the 1962 annual general meeting of the CAHA, delegates had lengthy discussions on the future of the Canadian national team at the Winter Olympics and World Championships. Roxburgh had previously stated opposition to the International Olympic Committee's (IOC) definition of amateur, and felt that Canada could not abide by the new Olympic code. He felt the new IOC amateur eligibility requirements were "a return to the horse and buggy days", and stating the "rule of amateurism was made years ago when the rich could send their sons and daughters into Olympic competition". He motioned not to send a team to the 1964 Winter Olympics on the basis of disagreeing with changes to the Olympic Oath and the definition of amateurism. He explained that since Canada pays its hockey players an allowance to compensate for lost salary it violated the oath, and that by the CAHA turning a blind eye to regulations, it set a bad example for youth. His motion was defeated by a vote of delegates.

Another resolution was submitted by the Alberta Amateur Hockey Association to have the Canadian Army train the players. Previously, the CAHA had approved an affiliation with the Canadian Army hockey team as of January 1962. The Thunder Bay Amateur Hockey Association submitted a resolution to have all-star teams from each member of the CAHA play a tournament, with the best team representing Canada.

Roxburgh mentioned a proposal from Father David Bauer to form a hockey team of the best student players available, and to train and complete schooling at the University of British Columbia. Bauer had recently coached the Toronto St. Michael's Majors to the 1961 Memorial Cup championship, and won the 1944 Memorial Cup as a player. Roxburgh, Juckes and Bauer were in attendance at the 1962 World Championships, and discussed ideas for a national team. Roxburgh invited Bauer to the 1962 general meeting to present the idea, which was tentatively approved by the delegates. Journalist Jim Coleman reported that consensus at the time was "for Canada to embark on a radical new course", even if it included establishing a team of university students to represent Canada at international hockey events.

=== Past-president ===
Roxburgh was succeeded by Art Potter as president of the CAHA in 1962. Roxburgh intended to stay involved with the CAHA as its past-president, despite having political aspirations. Father Bauer's national team process was implemented at the CAHA executive meeting in August 1962. The CAHA and the team were criticized by Maury Van Vliet, who led the Alberta Golden Bears. He was opposed to a stacked team competing in the Canadian Interuniversity Athletic Union. Roxburgh responded stating that the team would not be competing in a league, but rather represent Canadian college hockey as a whole. He further defended the decision and said, "Father Bauer is one of the greatest coaches in Canada". In advance of the upcoming Soviet Union winter tour of Canada in 1962, Roxburgh stated the junior Russian team would be tough competition for Canada, and the next generation of homegrown Russian players.

== Member of parliament ==
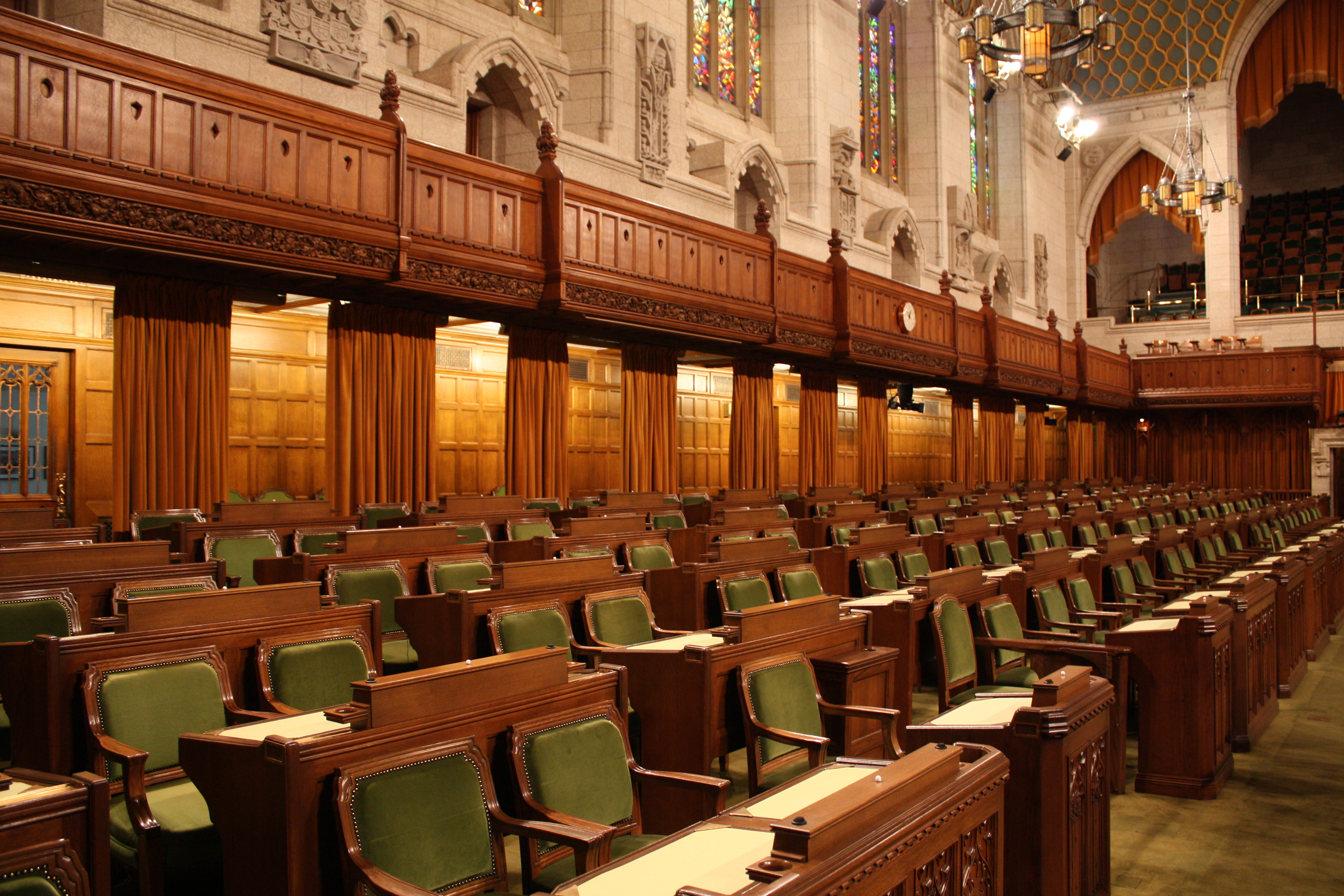
Chamber of the House of Commons of Canada

=== 25th parliament ===
Roxburgh began his political aspirations while still president of the CAHA, and skipped the 1962 Memorial Cup banquet due to preparations for the 1962 Canadian federal election. He was elected to the 25th Canadian Parliament on June 18, 1962, as the Liberal Party of Canada candidate in the riding of Norfolk, earning 10,882 votes. He said his opponent John Evans Knowles was a good man and good friend. After being elected, Roxburgh said he intended to be vocal about the Sports Advisory Council run by Jay Monteith, and how its committee members were chosen without input from Canadian sports associations like the CAHA.

When parliament opened, Roxburgh took his seat as a backbencher. He was not the only hockey person in the Liberal caucus, which included Red Kelly of the Toronto Maple Leafs, and ice hockey referee Rodger Mitchell. During the 25th parliament, Roxburgh was a member of the Standing Committee on Agriculture and Colonization, and the Standing Committee on Miscellaneous Private Bills. He urged fellow members of parliament to keep politics out of the national fitness program, which saw the budget reduced to $1,000,000 from the $5,000,000 promised. He also lobbied to see more grants to promote physical fitness within Canada.

=== 26th parliament ===
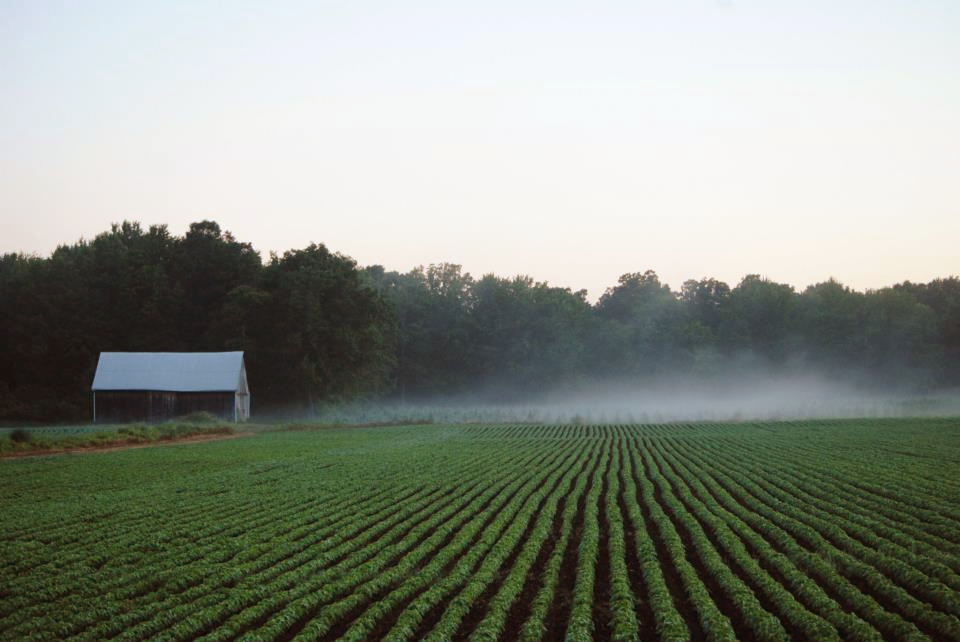
Tobacco production in Norfolk Country

Roxburgh was reelected in the 1963 Canadian federal election to represent the Norfolk riding on April 8, with 10,862 votes. During the first and second sessions of the 26th Canadian Parliament, he was a member of the Standing Committee on Agriculture and Colonization; the Special Committee on Food and Drugs; the Standing Committee on Mines, Forests and Waters; the Standing Committee on Privileges and Elections; the Standing Committee on Miscellaneous Private Bills; and the Standing Committee on Estimates. In the third session, he was a member of the Special Committee on Food and Drugs; the Standing Committee on Indian Affairs, Human Rights and Citizenship and Immigration; and the Standing Committee on Agriculture, Forestry and Rural Development.

In September 1964, Roxburgh supported legislation by Harry Hays, the Minister of Agriculture of Canada, to guarantee loans for groups of three or more farmers buying farm machinery. He stated, "farmers are the greatest group of co-operators in the world, and the only group for which this kind of legislation would really work". Since his Norfolk riding is the heart of the Ontario tobacco belt, he also sought larger federal grants for production and processing for the Canadian tobacco industry.

In November 1964, a parliamentary committee was considered to investigate the structure of professional and amateur hockey relationship with respect to the contracts of junior-aged players. Red Kelly supported an inquiry saying that many Canadians opposed a system that tied a young man to an NHL team for life. Roxburgh defended the system stating that, an inquiry would "set the facts straight", and "might be of value in pointing out to the public the facts of the matter".

==== Canada's national game debate ====
In May 1964, Roxburgh did extensive research to find if Canadian parliament had ever declared a national game, and specifically looked into whether lacrosse was officially declared. After going through parliamentary records, he found no law was ever enacted. The Canadian Press reported at the time that the myth of lacrosse as Canada's national game possibly came from a book published in 1869 titled Lacrosse, the National Game of Canada, and that the Canadian Lacrosse Association was founded in 1867. His endeavour to declare hockey as Canada's national game coincided with the Great Canadian Flag Debate. On October 28, 1964, Roxburgh moved to introduce Bill C–132, with respect to declaring hockey as the national game of Canada, and submitted his opening resolution.

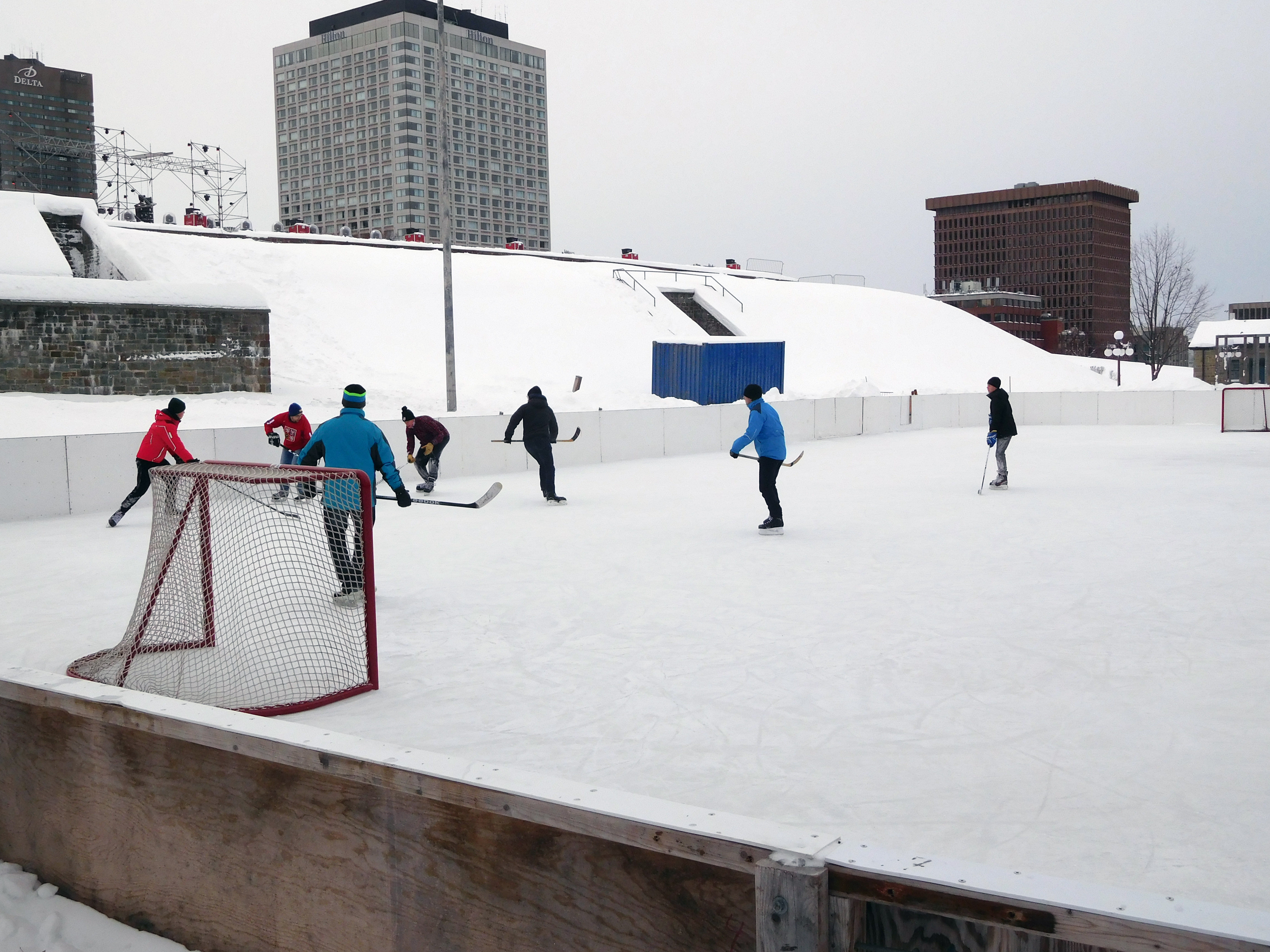
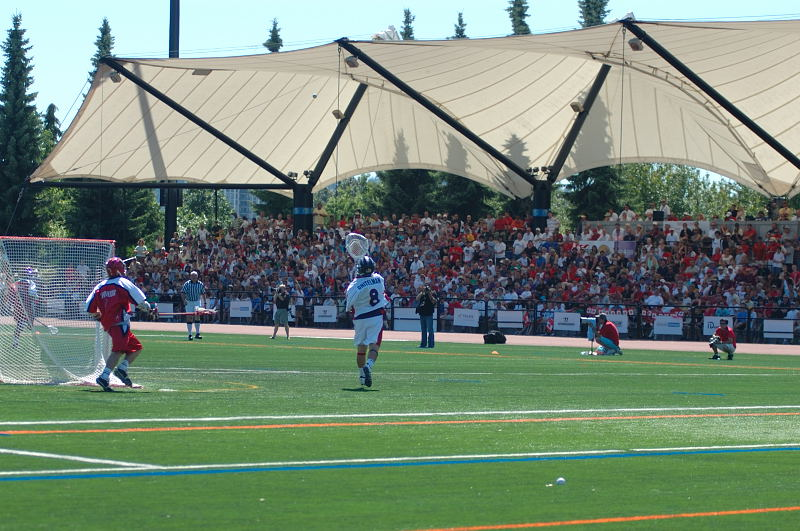
Roxburgh introduced Bill C–132 in 1964, which began the debate for Canada's national game between hockey and lacrosse.

… At this time it gives me real pleasure to ask parliament to give consideration to this bill to make hockey Canada's national game. Hockey is indeed a wonderful game, clean, fast and exhilarating. More than any game in Canada it has caught the imagination and enthusiasm of thousands upon thousands of people and has given them, and still gives them, great moments of enjoyment either as players or as spectators. More especially is it favoured by the youth of Canada. Hockey with its dash, crash and smash truly represents the very tempo of our Canadian youth. Today hockey is recognized throughout the world as Canada's national game. During the period between the two world wars and for a long period after the second world war, when a very limited number of Canadians went overseas as tourists, or on business, or as politicians. If it had not been for the game of hockey being played throughout the countries of Europe, Europe would never have heard the name of Canada. And this is something very, very important. Outside of war at that time-not now, but at that time-the only time they ever heard the name of Canada mentioned was when our hockey team played in their countries. I should like to say this to the sports minded people of all these countries and also of Canada. The words "hockey" and "Canada" are synonymous. Hockey is Canada; Canada is hockey.

Canadian Lacrosse Association members responded to the motion by calling it insulting and "out of line", and vowed to fight it. On June 11, 1965, Bob Prittie replied by introducing a separate bill to have lacrosse declared as Canada's national game and stated that, "I think it is fitting at this time when we are considering national flags, national anthems and other national symbols, that this particular matter should be settled now". The choice of Canada's national game was debated in 1965, but neither bill was passed when parliament was dissolved. In 1967, Prime Minister Lester B. Pearson proposed to name national summer and winter games, but nothing was resolved. Finally in April 1994, Bill C–212 was passed to recognize hockey as Canada's official winter game, and lacrosse as its summer game.

=== 27th parliament ===
Roxburgh was reelected in the 1965 Canadian federal election to represent the Norfolk riding on November 8, with 9,833 votes. During the first and second sessions of the 27th Canadian Parliament, he was a member of the Standing Committee on Agriculture, Forestry and Rural Development; the Standing Committee on Northern Affairs and National Resources; the Standing Committee on Indian Affairs, Human Rights and Citizenship and Immigration; the Special Joint Committee on Immigration; the Special Committee on Drug Costs and Prices; the Standing Committee on Miscellaneous Estimates; and the Special Joint Committee on the National and Royal Anthems. He also served as vice-chairman of the Standing Committee on Indian Affairs, Human Rights and Citizenship and Immigration.

In April 1967, Roxburgh introduced Bill C–289, to amend the Canada Elections Act in favour of university students registering as voters. He stated that during the 1965 general election, students were unable to register in a new constituency when relocating for studies. He compared this to ministers and teachers being able to move into a new constituency between the beginning of the campaign period and polling day, and register as voters. The bill sought for registered university students be given the same privilege.

Roxburgh campaigned for the 1968 Canadian federal election in the redistributed Norfolk—Haldimand riding, as part of the Pierre Trudeau Liberal team. Roxburgh positioned himself as a self-described federalist, working for the farming community and encouraging youth to become involved. He received 13,132 votes, but was defeated by William David Knowles who was elected with 14,908 votes. Roxburgh's political career ended after the election, and 6 years and 7 days of service to the House of Commons of Canada.

== Personal life ==
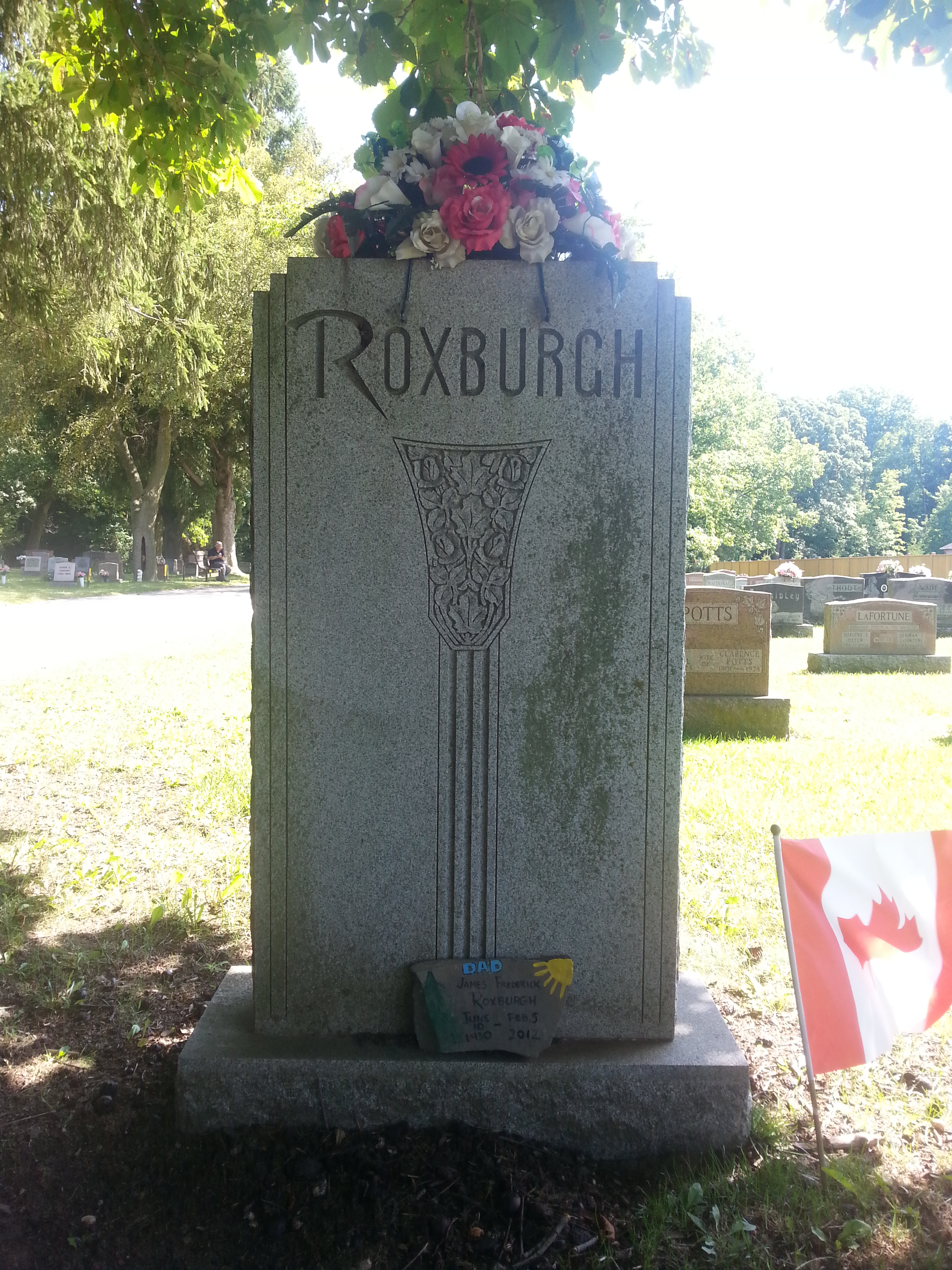
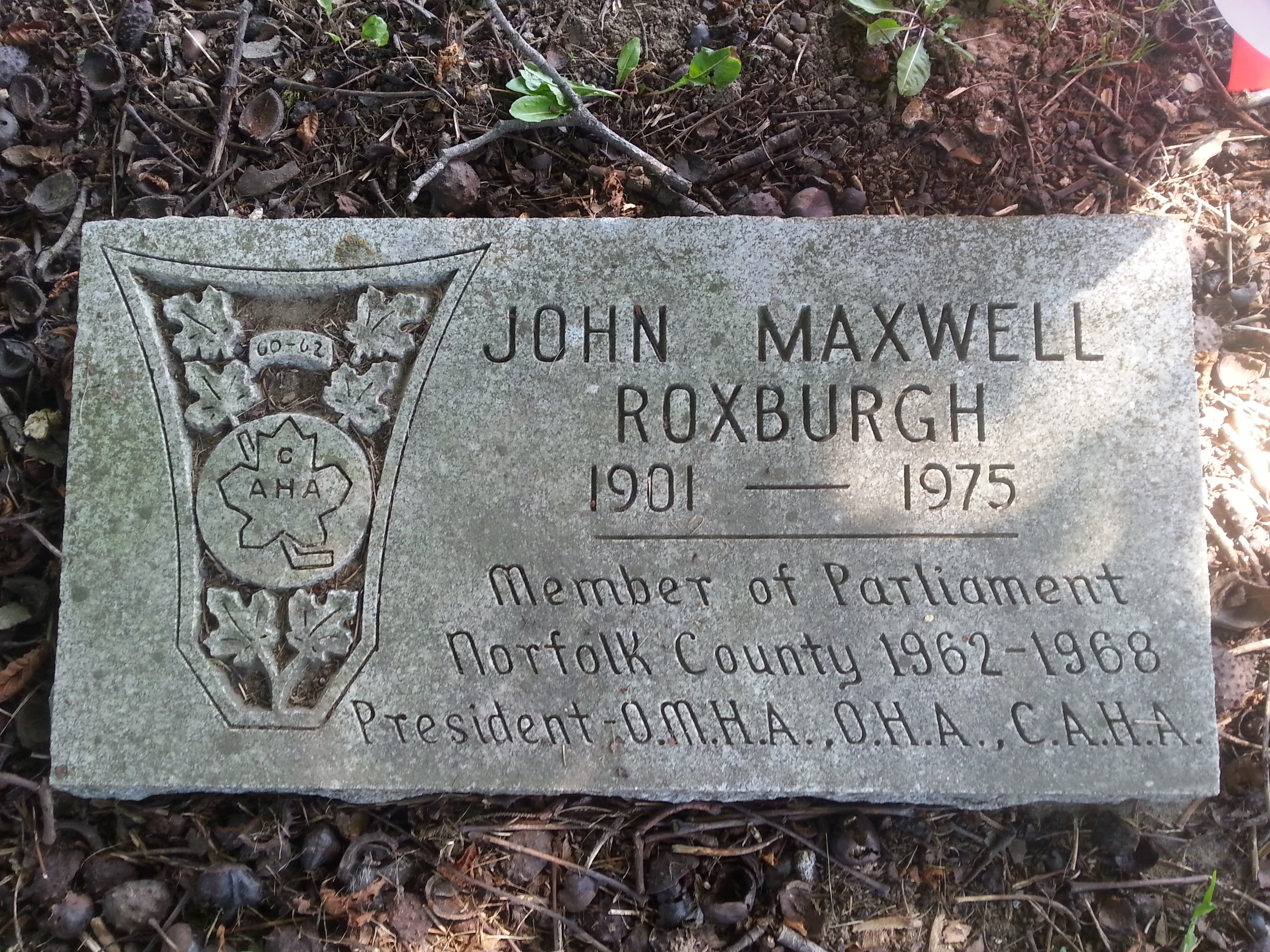
Roxburgh's grave markers in Oakwood Cemetery

Roxburgh met his wife Marion Seldon while they attended Ontario Agricultural College. They later married and had two sons. He was known locally as "Roxy", and was a member of the Simcoe Kinsmen Club, the Simcoe Rotary Club, and St. James United Church. He nominated fellow farmer and municipal politician, John E. Cooper for the Haldimand—Norfolk riding in the 1963 Ontario general election.

After retiring, Roxburgh spent winters in Englewood, Florida. He and his wife were returning from an evening fishing trip on January 18, 1975, when their boat collided with a retaining wall in the dark. Roxburgh sustained internal injuries and was hospitalized. Plans were made for him to return to Canada in mid-February, but his condition worsened. He died on February 27, 1975, at a hospital in Venice, Florida at age 74. He was interred at Oakwood Cemetery in Simcoe, Ontario.

== Legacy and honours ==
The Canadian Press reported Roxburgh as a man with a booming voice, and not known to be the silent type. After his election as CAHA president, he was honoured with a banquet organized by the Simcoe Minor Hockey Association to recognize his contributions to local and national ice hockey, and received a congratulatory telegram from the Soviet Union Ice Hockey Federation. He received the OHA Gold Stick in 1961, in recognition of contributions to hockey, and received the similar AHAUS citation award in 1962.

Roxburgh received the CAHA's Order of Merit in 1971, for a lifetime of work in hockey. He was made a life member of the OHA in 1973, was also a life member of the OMHA, and is the namesake of the Jack Roxburgh Trophy for the OMHA Juvenile C playoff championship. He was posthumously inducted into the Norfolk County Sports Hall of Recognition in 1996.

== Bibliography ==
- "2017–2018 Manual of Operations: By-laws, Regulations & Policies" (PDF). Ontario Minor Hockey Association. Archived from the original (PDF) on October 2, 2018 – via Lambton Kent Secondary School Athletic Association.
- Norfolk Historical Society (1985). David Judd (ed.). Simcoe: County Town of Norfolk, A History 1790 to 1978. Delhi, Ontario: Cash Crop Farming Publications Ltd. ISBN 0-920624-01-4.
- Oliver, Greg (2017). Father Bauer and the Great Experiment: The Genesis of Canadian Olympic Hockey. Toronto, Ontario: ECW Press. ISBN 978-1-77041-249-1.
- Pond, George (2019). Norfolk County Sports Hall of Recognition: The First Twenty-Five Years. Simcoe, Ontario, Canada: Second Ave. Printing.
- History of the Ontario Minor Hockey Association: 75th Anniversary season. Richmond Hill, Ontario: Ontario Minor Hockey Association. 2010.
- Young, Scott (1989). 100 Years of Dropping the Puck. Toronto, Ontario: McClelland & Stewart. ISBN 0-7710-9093-5.
- Constitution, By-laws, Regulations, History. Gloucester, Ontario: Canadian Amateur Hockey Association. May 1990.
