= Norfolk (federal electoral district) =

Former federal electoral district in Ontario, Canada

Ontario electoral district

Defunct federal electoral district
- Legislature: House of Commons
- District created: 1903, 1933
- District abolished: 1924, 1966
- First contested: 1904
- Last contested: 1965

Norfolk was a federal electoral district represented in the House of Commons of Canada from 1904 to 1925. It was located in the province of Ontario. This riding was first created in 1903 from Norfolk North and Norfolk South ridings.

It consisted of the county of Norfolk.

The electoral district was abolished in 1924 when it was merged into Norfolk—Elgin riding.

It was recreated in 1933, again consisting of the county of Norfolk.

The electoral district was abolished in 1966 when it was merged into Norfolk—Haldimand riding.

== Members of Parliament ==
This riding elected the following members of the House of Commons of Canada:

Parliament	Years	Member	Party
Riding created from Norfolk North and Norfolk South
10th	1904–1908	David Tisdale	Conservative
11th	1908–1911	Alexander McCall	Conservative
12th	1911–1917	William Andrew Charlton	Liberal
13th	1917–1921	William Andrew Charlton	Government (Unionist)
14th	1921–1925	John Alexander Wallace	Progressive
Riding dissolved into Norfolk—Elgin
Riding re-created from Norfolk—Elgin
18th	1935–1940	William Horace Taylor	Liberal
19th	1940–1945	William Horace Taylor	Liberal
20th	1945–1949	Theobald Butler Barrett	Progressive Conservative
21st	1949–1953	Raymond Elmer Anderson	Liberal
22nd	1953–1957	Raymond Elmer Anderson	Liberal
23rd	1957–1958	Evans Knowles	Progressive Conservative
24th	1958–1962	Evans Knowles	Progressive Conservative
25th	1962–1963	Jack Roxburgh	Liberal
26th	1963–1965	Jack Roxburgh	Liberal
27th	1965–1968	Jack Roxburgh	Liberal
Riding dissolved into Norfolk—Haldimand

== Election results ==
=== 1904–1925 ===
1904 Canadian federal election
Party	Candidate	Votes
Conservative	David Tisdale	3,336
Liberal	Hal B. Douly	3,150

1908 Canadian federal election
Party	Candidate	Votes
Conservative	Alexander McCall	3,456
Liberal	Hal B. Donly	3,030

1911 Canadian federal election
Party	Candidate	Votes
Liberal	William Andrew Charlton	3,179
Conservative	Alexander McCall	3,061

1917 Canadian federal election
Party	Candidate	Votes
Government (Unionist)	William Andrew Charlton	4,544
Opposition (Laurier Liberals)	John Alexander Wallace	3,258

1921 Canadian federal election
Party	Candidate	Votes
Progressive	John Alexander Wallace	6,205
Conservative	William Sutton	5,451

=== 1935–1968 ===
1935 Canadian federal election
Party	Candidate	Votes
Liberal	William Horace Taylor	7,623
Conservative	David Edgett Tisdale	4,390
Reconstruction	Samuel Sandford English	2,113
Co-operative Commonwealth	Alexander Charles Stewart	285

1940 Canadian federal election
Party	Candidate	Votes
Liberal	William Horace Taylor	9,230
National Government	Arthur Clarence Pratt	5,894

1945 Canadian federal election
Party	Candidate	Votes
Progressive Conservative	Theobald Butler Barrett	7,505
Liberal	Wilton Erwin Honey	6,699
Co-operative Commonwealth	John Alexander Wallace	1,599

1949 Canadian federal election
Party	Candidate	Votes
Liberal	Raymond Elmer Anderson	9,280
Progressive Conservative	Theobald Butler Barrett	7,067
Co-operative Commonwealth	William Ernest Stanl James	1,180

1953 Canadian federal election
Party	Candidate	Votes
Liberal	Raymond Elmer Anderson	8,475
Progressive Conservative	Charles Wellington Birdsall	6,747
Co-operative Commonwealth	William E. S. James	621
Labor–Progressive	Helen Marks	193

1957 Canadian federal election
Party	Candidate	Votes
Progressive Conservative	Evans Knowles	10,885
Liberal	Raymond Elmer Anderson	7,711
Social Credit	Wesley Weekes Leonard	690

1958 Canadian federal election
Party	Candidate	Votes
Progressive Conservative	Evans Knowles	12,369
Liberal	Raymond Elmer Anderson	7,347

1962 Canadian federal election
Party	Candidate	Votes
Liberal	Jack Roxburgh	10,882
Progressive Conservative	Evans Knowles	9,092
New Democratic	Hugh Foley	1,216
Social Credit	Edwin Herbert Dickson	464

1963 Canadian federal election
Party	Candidate	Votes
Liberal	Jack Roxburgh	10,862
Progressive Conservative	Evans Knowles	10,115
New Democratic	Leonard Padyk	1,156
Social Credit	James W. Judd	594

1965 Canadian federal election
Party	Candidate	Votes
Liberal	Jack Roxburgh	9,833
Progressive Conservative	Evans Knowles	9,724
New Democratic	Myron Stachnyk	1,532
Social Credit	William Triska	319

== See also ==
- List of Canadian electoral districts
- Historical federal electoral districts of Canada
