= Joseph Jackson (Canadian politician) =

Parliamentarian and lumberman (1831–1908)

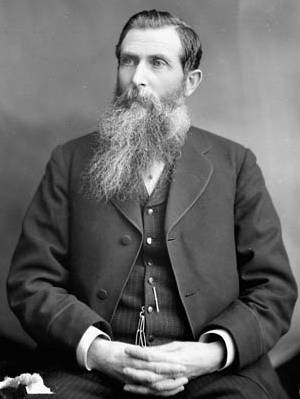

Member of the Canadian Parliament for Norfolk South
- In office 1882–1887
- Preceded by: William Wallace
- Succeeded by: David Tisdale

Personal details
- Born: April 1, 1831 Norfolk County, Upper Canada
- Died: October 31, 1908 (aged 77)
- Party: Liberal

Joseph Jackson (April 1, 1831 – October 31, 1908) was a Canadian parliamentarian and lumberman.

Jackson was born in Norfolk County in what was then Upper Canada and became a lumberman in Simcoe. He was elected to the House of Commons of Canada in the 1882 federal election representing Norfolk South as a Liberal MP after defeating incumbent William Wallace by 26 votes. He was defeated after a single term in the 1887 federal election losing to Conservative David Tisdale by 61 votes.

In 1892, he was appointed sheriff of Norfolk.

He was married twice: first to Melinda Dowling and then to Mrs. Robert Jackson. He died in Simcoe at the age of 77.

1882 Canadian federal election: South Riding of Norfolk
| Party | Candidate | Votes |
|---|---|---|
| Liberal | JACKSON, Joseph | 1,560 |
| Unknown | WALLACE, William | 1,534 |

1887 Canadian federal election: South Riding of Norfolk
| Party | Candidate | Votes |
|---|---|---|
| Conservative | TISDALE, David | 1,797 |
| Liberal | JACKSON, Joseph | 1,736 |
