= Thomas Robert Atkinson =

Canadian politician

Ontario MPP
- In office 1911–1919
- Preceded by: Hugh Paterson Innes
- Succeeded by: George David Sewell
- In office 1905–1908
- Preceded by: Archibald Little
- Succeeded by: Hugh Paterson Innes
- Constituency: Norfolk North

Personal details
- Born: August 24, 1854 Ancaster township
- Died: December 11, 1921 (aged 67) Norfolk, Ontario
- Party: Liberal
- Spouse: Alice Steele (m. 1879)
- Occupation: Lawyer

Thomas Robert Atkinson (August 24, 1854 – December 11, 1921) was a lawyer and politician in Ontario, Canada. He represented Norfolk North in the Legislative Assembly of Ontario from 1905 to 1908 and from 1911 to 1919 as a Liberal.

The son of Thomas Atkinson and Mary Ballantine, he was born in Ancaster township and was educated in Simcoe, at Queen's University and at Osgoode Hall Law School. In 1879, he married Alice Steele. Atkinson served as mayor of Simcoe from 1895 to 1896. He ran unsuccessfully for the Norfolk South seat in the Canadian House of Commons in 1900, losing to David Tisdale. Atkinson was defeated by Hugh Paterson Innes when he ran for reelection to the Ontario assembly in 1908, but he was reelected in 1911 and 1914.

1900 Canadian federal election: Norfolk South
Party	Candidate	Votes
Conservative	TISDALE, Hon. David	2,472
Liberal	ATKINSON, Thos. R.	2,200
