= Hugh Paterson Innes =

Canadian politician

Ontario MPP
- In office 1908–1911
- Preceded by: Thomas Robert Atkinson
- Succeeded by: Thomas Robert Atkinson
- Constituency: Norfolk North

Personal details
- Born: September 14, 1870 Dundas, Ontario
- Died: October 10, 1931 (aged 61) Dufferin County, Ontario
- Party: Conservative
- Spouse: Mabel M. Livingston (m. 1896)
- Occupation: Lawyer

Hugh Paterson Innes, KC (September 14, 1870 – October 10, 1931) was an Ontario lawyer, judge and political figure. He represented Norfolk North in the Legislative Assembly of Ontario from 1908 to 1911 as a Conservative member.

He was born in Dundas, Ontario, the son of William P. Innes, and was educated in Simcoe. He studied law at Osgoode Hall, was called to the bar in 1893 and set up practice in Simcoe. Innes served as town solicitor and was also a member of the local school board. In 1908, he was named King's Counsel. He married Mabel M. Livingston in 1896, with whom he had eight children.

He was named judge for Dufferin County in May 1931. Innes died later that year when his car collided with a stationary freight train at night during a heavy rainstorm.
