= Frederick Snider =

Canadian politician

Ontario MPP
- In office 1902–1903
- Preceded by: Edwin Clarendon Carpenter
- Succeeded by: Archibald Little
- Constituency: Norfolk North

Personal details
- Born: Frederick Samuel Snider; September 2, 1854 Windham Township, Norfolk County, Ontario
- Died: February 10, 1918 (aged 63) Simcoe, Ontario
- Party: Conservative
- Spouse: Caroline E. Douglas
- Occupation: Physician

Frederick Samuel Snider (September 2, 1854—February 10, 1918) was a provincial politician, physician, and sheriff in Norfolk County, Ontario, Canada. He was born in Windham Township in Norfolk County, Ontario, and received his medical degree from McGill University. He practiced medicine in Simcoe, Teeterville, and Waterford and served on the county council for four years before becoming warden in 1898.

In the 1902 Ontario general election he was the Conservative Party of Ontario candidate in Norfolk North and was elected by a margin of 23 votes. The results were challenged in court and it was alleged prior to the hearing that the Conservatives were attempting to discourage witnesses being called to support the challenge by distributing handbills threatening with jail time anyone "bribed" to give evidence. The petition to overturn the results alleged that Snider was paid a fee by the Conservative Party to stand as a candidate. It was further alleged that sums ranging from $2 to $5 were paid to fifty individuals in exchange for their votes and that free railway tickets were provided to several voters. In the resulting trial, five charges of corrupt election practices were upheld after Snider admitted accepting $500 from the Conservative Party. Snider was unseated, his seat was declared vacant and a by-election was held for which Snider was re-nominated as the Conservative candidate. The Liberal candidate, Archibald Little, defeated Snider by 55 votes.

Snider served as sheriff of Norfolk County from 1908 until his death in 1918.
