= Arthur Clarence Pratt =

Arthur Pratt

Ontario MPP
- In office 1905–1919
- Preceded by: William Andrew Charlton
- Succeeded by: Joseph Cridland
- Constituency: Norfolk South

Personal details
- Born: February 6, 1871 Lynedoch, Ontario
- Died: August 26, 1948 (aged 77) Simcoe, Ontario
- Party: Conservative
- Spouse: Alice Bertha Turner (m. 1900)
- Occupation: Businessman

Military service
- Allegiance: Canadian
- Branch/service: Canadian Army
- Years of service: 1914-1918
- Rank: Lieutenant-Colonel
- Unit: Canadian Expeditionary Force

Arthur Clarence Pratt (February 6, 1871 – August 26, 1948) was an office manager and political figure in Ontario. He represented Norfolk South in the Legislative Assembly of Ontario from 1905 to 1919 as a Conservative member.

He was born in Lynedoch, Norfolk County, the son of William Pratt and Maria Bottomley, both natives of Ireland, and was educated in Simcoe and Woodstock, at the Ottawa Normal School and at the Hamilton Normal College. In 1900, Pratt married Alice Bertha Turner. In 1911, with George Tate Blackstock, he founded the Canadian branch of the English Imperial Mission association. He was named lieutenant-colonel of the 133rd Battalion in the Canadian Expeditionary Force in 1916. He died suddenly in 1948.
