= John Alexander Wallace =

Canadian politician, engineer and farmer

Member of Parliament for Norfolk
- In office 1921–1925
- Preceded by: William Andrew Charlton
- Succeeded by: William Horace Taylor

Personal details
- Born: April 3, 1881 Simcoe, Ontario, Canada
- Died: October 13, 1961 (aged 80)
- Party: Laurier Liberals (1917–1921); Progressive (1921–1945); Co-operative Commonwealth Federation (1945)
- Profession: Engineer farmer

John Alexander Wallace (April 3, 1881 – October 13, 1961) was a Canadian politician, engineer and farmer.

Wallace was born in Simcoe, Ontario, Canada. He was elected in 1921 to the House of Commons of Canada as a Member of the Progressive Party in the riding of Norfolk. He was previously defeated in the 1917 election as a Member of Laurier's Liberals and in 1945 as a Member of the Co-operative Commonwealth Federation.
