= Archibald Little (politician) =

Canadian politician

Ontario MPP
- In office 1903–1904
- Preceded by: Frederick Snider
- Succeeded by: Thomas Robert Atkinson
- Constituency: Norfolk North

Personal details
- Born: January 12, 1837 Mayfield, Chinguacousy Township, Peel County, Upper Canada
- Died: April 14, 1922 (aged 85) Vancouver, British Columbia
- Party: Liberal
- Spouse: Louisa McCool (m. 1861)
- Occupation: Merchant

Archibald Little (January 12, 1837 – April 14, 1922) was an Ontario merchant and political figure. He represented Norfolk North in the Legislative Assembly of Ontario as a Liberal member from 1903 to 1904. Little won his seat in a by-election after the incumbent, Frederick Snider, was unseated by a court on five charges of electoral corruption for paying for railway tickets for voters and accepting money from the Conservative Party in exchange for being the party's candidate.

Little was born in Mayfield, Chinguacousy Township, Peel County, Upper Canada, the son of William Little. In 1868, he married Louisa McCool. He was a merchant in Waterford and chairman of the High School board. He died in Vancouver, British Columbia in 1922.
