= John Bailey Freeman =

Canadian politician

Ontario MPP
- In office 1879–1890
- Preceded by: John Fitzgerald Clarke
- Succeeded by: Edwin Clarendon Carpenter
- Constituency: Norfolk North

Personal details
- Born: August 22, 1835 Windham Township, Norfolk County, Upper Canada
- Died: November 22, 1890 (aged 55)
- Party: Liberal
- Spouse: Jane Scatherd (m. 1861)
- Occupation: Farmer

John Bailey Freeman (August 22, 1835 – November 22, 1890) was an Ontario farmer and political figure. He represented Norfolk North in the Legislative Assembly of Ontario from 1879 to 1890 as a Liberal member.

He was born in Windham Township, Norfolk County, Upper Canada in 1835, the son of Daniel Wesley Freeman and the grandson of the Reverend Daniel Freeman, one of the first settlers in the county. In 1861, he married Jane, the daughter of Thomas Scatcherd. Freeman served on the township council and was president of the county agricultural society. He served as government whip in the assembly.

Freeman Township in the Muskoka District was named after him.

== Electoral history ==
1879 Ontario general election: Norfolk North
Party	Candidate	Votes	%	±%
Liberal	John Bailey Freeman	1,490	52.12	−0.08
Conservative	James Wilson	1,369	47.88	+0.08
Total valid votes		2,859	71.55	−4.23
Eligible voters		3,996		
Liberal hold		Swing		−0.08
Source: Elections Ontario
