= Norfolk South (federal electoral district) =

Former federal electoral district in Ontario, Canada

Norfolk South was a federal electoral district represented in the House of Commons of Canada from 1867 to 1904. It was located in the province of Ontario. It was created by the British North America Act 1867 which divided the county of Norfolk into two ridings. The South Riding consisted of the Townships of Charlotteville, Houghton, Walsingham, and Woodhouse and the Woodhouse Gore.

In 1882, the town of Simcoe and the village of Port Dover were added to the riding. In 1892, South Norfolk was defined as above, with the addition of the township of Walpole and the village of Port Rowan.

The electoral district was abolished in 1903 when it was redistributed between Haldimand and Norfolk ridings.

== Electoral history ==
1867 Canadian federal election
Party	Candidate	Votes
Liberal	Peter Lawson	1,050
Unknown	N. O. Walker	969
Eligible voters		2,468
Source: Canadian Parliamentary Guide, 1871

1872 Canadian federal election
Party	Candidate	Votes
Conservative	William Wallace	1,208
Unknown	H. Killmaster	1,098
Source: Canadian Elections Database

1874 Canadian federal election
Party	Candidate	Votes
Liberal	STUART, John	1,233
Unknown	LAWSON, P.	1,140

By-election: On election being declared void, 16 December 1874: South Riding of Norfolk
Party	Candidate	Votes
Conservative	WALLACE, William	1,402
Unknown	STUART, John	1,244

1878 Canadian federal election
Party	Candidate	Votes
Conservative	WALLACE, William	1,327
Unknown	ALLAN, H.W.	1,310

1882 Canadian federal election
Party	Candidate	Votes
Liberal	JACKSON, Joseph	1,560
Unknown	WALLACE, William	1,534

1887 Canadian federal election
Party	Candidate	Votes
Conservative	TISDALE, David	1,797
Liberal	JACKSON, Joseph	1,736

1891 Canadian federal election
Party	Candidate	Votes
Conservative	TISDALE, David	2,051
Liberal	ELLIS, Jonathan	1,639

1896 Canadian federal election
Party	Candidate	Votes
Conservative	TISDALE, Hon. David	2,383
Patrons of Industry	WALKER, George	2,110

1900 Canadian federal election
Party	Candidate	Votes
Conservative	TISDALE, Hon. David	2,472
Liberal	ATKINSON, Thos. R.	2,200

== See also ==
- List of Canadian electoral districts
- Historical federal electoral districts of Canada
