= Norfolk South (provincial electoral district) =

Former provincial electoral district in Ontario, Canada

Ontario electoral district

Defunct provincial electoral district
- Legislature: Legislative Assembly of Ontario
- District created: 1867
- District abolished: 1925
- First contested: 1867
- Last contested: 1923

Norfolk South was an electoral riding in Ontario, Canada. It was created in 1867 at the time of confederation and was abolished in 1933 before the 1934 election.

== Members of Provincial Parliament ==
Norfolk South
Assembly	Years	Member	Party
1st	1867–1871	Simpson McCall	Liberal
2nd	1871–1874	Simpson McCall	Liberal
3rd	1875–1879	Richard Richardson	Conservative
4th	1879–1883	William Morgan	Conservative
5th	1883–1886	William Morgan	Conservative
6th	1886–1890	William Morgan	Conservative
7th	1890–1894	William Andrew Charlton	Liberal
8th	1894–1898	William Andrew Charlton	Liberal
9th	1898–1902	William Andrew Charlton	Liberal
10th	1902–1904	William Andrew Charlton	Liberal
11th	1905–1908	Arthur Clarence Pratt	Conservative
12th	1908–1911	Arthur Clarence Pratt	Conservative
13th	1911–1914	Arthur Clarence Pratt	Conservative
14th	1914–1919	Arthur Clarence Pratt	Conservative
15th	1919–1923	Joseph Cridland	United Farmers
16th	1923–1926	John Strickler Martin	Conservative
Sourced from the Ontario Legislative Assembly
Merged into Norfolk before the 1926 election

== Election results ==
Ontario provincial by-election, August 16, 1923 Ministerial by-election, appointment as Minister of Agriculture
Party	Candidate	Votes
Conservative	John Strickler Martin	acclaimed
Source: Elections Ontario

1923 Ontario general election
Party	Candidate	Votes	%	±%
Conservative	John Strickler Martin	3,070	55.84	–
United Farmers	Joseph Cridland	2,428	44.16	–18.51
Total valid votes		5,498	98.97	
Total rejected ballots		57	1.03	–3.81
Turnout		5,555	73.34	–1.80
Eligible voters		7,574		
Conservative gain from United Farmers		Swing		–
Source: Elections Ontario

1919 Ontario general election
Party	Candidate	Votes	%	±%
United Farmers	Joseph Cridland	3,280	62.67	–
Independent Conservative	Arthur Clarence Pratt	1,954	37.33	–15.91
Total valid votes		5,234	95.16	
Total rejected ballots		266	4.84	+4.07
Turnout		5,500	75.15	–15.52
Eligible voters		7,319		
United Farmers gain from Conservative		Swing		+7.95
Source: Elections Ontario

1914 Ontario general election
Party	Candidate	Votes	%	±%
Conservative	Arthur Clarence Pratt	1,381	53.24	–3.75
Conservative-Temperance	Andrew Innes	1,213	46.76	–
Total valid votes		2,594	99.23	
Total rejected ballots		20	0.77	+0.09
Turnout		2,614	90.67	+23.68
Eligible voters		2,883		
Conservative hold		Swing		–1.88
Source: Elections Ontario

1911 Ontario general election
Party	Candidate	Votes	%	±%
Conservative	Arthur Clarence Pratt	1,423	56.99	+4.95
Liberal	George Hammond	1,046	41.89	–6.07
Socialist	Freeman Arthur Ravin	28	1.12	–
Total valid votes		2,497	99.32	
Total rejected ballots		17	0.68	–0.70
Turnout		2,514	66.99	–25.50
Eligible voters		3,753		
Conservative hold		Swing		+5.51
Source: Elections Ontario

1908 Ontario general election
Party	Candidate	Votes	%	±%
Conservative	Arthur Clarence Pratt	1,490	52.04	+1.85
Liberal	Cornelius S. Killmaster	1,373	47.96	–1.85
Total valid votes		2,863	98.62	
Total rejected ballots		40	1.38	–0.27
Turnout		2,903	92.48	+0.81
Eligible voters		3,139		
Conservative hold		Swing		+1.85
Source: Elections Ontario

1905 Ontario general election
Party	Candidate	Votes	%	±%
Conservative	Arthur Clarence Pratt	1,711	50.19	+1.30
Liberal	William Andrew Charlton	1,698	49.81	–1.30
Total valid votes		3,409	98.36	
Total rejected ballots		57	1.64	+0.21
Turnout		3,466	91.67	+8.52
Eligible voters		3,781		
Conservative gain from Liberal		Swing		+1.30
Source: Elections Ontario

1902 Ontario general election
Party	Candidate	Votes	%	±%
Liberal	William Andrew Charlton	1,723	51.11	+0.61
Conservative	J. L. Buck	1,648	48.89	–0.61
Total valid votes		3,371	98.57	
Total rejected ballots		49	1.43	+0.50
Turnout		3,420	83.15	–0.87
Eligible voters		4,113		
Liberal hold		Swing		+0.61
Source: Elections Ontario

1898 Ontario general election
Party	Candidate	Votes	%	±%
Liberal	William Andrew Charlton	1,723	50.50	+0.13
Conservative	J. L. Buck	1,689	49.50	–
Total valid votes		3,412	99.07	
Total rejected ballots		32	0.93	+0.51
Turnout		3,444	84.02	+10.96
Eligible voters		4,099		
Liberal hold		Swing		+0.06
Source: Elections Ontario

1894 Ontario general election
Party	Candidate	Votes	%	±%
Liberal	William Andrew Charlton	1,424	50.37	–1.12
Patrons of Industry	G. Cruise	1,403	49.63	–
Total valid votes		2,827	99.58	
Total rejected ballots		12	0.42	+0.42
Turnout		2,839	73.06	–
Eligible voters		3,886		
Liberal hold		Swing		–0.56
Source: Elections Ontario

Ontario provincial by-election, January 23, 1891 Void election
Party	Candidate	Votes	%	±%
Liberal	William Andrew Charlton	1,676	51.49	+0.43
Conservative	William Morgan	1,579	48.51	–0.43
Total valid votes		3,255	100.00	
Total rejected ballots		–		
Turnout		3,255	–	–
Eligible voters				
Liberal hold		Swing		+0.43
Source: Elections Ontario

1890 Ontario general election
Party	Candidate	Votes	%	±%
Liberal	William Andrew Charlton	1,563	51.06	+3.18
Conservative	William Morgan	1,498	48.94	–3.18
Total valid votes		3,061	99.29	
Total rejected ballots		22	0.71	–0.03
Turnout		3,083	76.54	–1.75
Eligible voters		4,028		
Liberal gain from Conservative		Swing		+3.18
Source: Elections Ontario

1886 Ontario general election
Party	Candidate	Votes	%	±%
Conservative	William Morgan	1,528	52.11	+1.62
Liberal	William Andrew Charlton	1,404	47.89	–1.62
Total valid votes		2,932	99.26	
Total rejected ballots		22	0.74	–0.03
Turnout		2,954	78.29	+4.62
Eligible voters		3,773		
Conservative hold		Swing		+1.62
Source: Elections Ontario

1883 Ontario general election
Party	Candidate	Votes	%	±%
Conservative	William Morgan	1,492	50.49	+0.13
Liberal	Mr. McBurney	1,463	49.51	–0.13
Total valid votes		2,955	99.23	
Total rejected ballots		23	0.77	+0.77
Turnout		2,978	73.68	–2.56
Eligible voters		4,042		
Conservative hold		Swing		+0.13
Source: Elections Ontario

1879 Ontario general election
Party	Candidate	Votes	%	±%
Conservative	William Morgan	1,386	50.36	−7.91
Liberal	Mr. Austin	1,366	49.64	
Total valid votes		2,752	76.23	+11.52
Eligible voters		3,610		
Conservative hold		Swing		−7.91
Source: Elections Ontario

1875 Ontario general election
Party	Candidate	Votes	%	±%
Conservative	Richard Richardson	1,293	58.27	+11.57
Independent	Simpson McCall	926	41.73	−11.57
Total valid votes		2,219	64.71	−7.02
Eligible voters		3,429		
Conservative gain from Liberal		Swing		+11.57
Source: Elections Ontario

1871 Ontario general election
Party	Candidate	Votes	%	±%
Liberal	Simpson McCall	1,009	53.30	+2.84
Conservative	James Wilson	884	46.70	−2.84
Turnout		1,893	71.73	−6.33
Eligible voters		2,639		
Liberal hold		Swing		+2.84
Source: Elections Ontario

1867 Ontario general election
Party	Candidate	Votes	%
Liberal	Simpson McCall	975	50.47
Conservative	R. Crysler	957	49.53
Total valid votes		1,932	78.06
Eligible voters		2,475	
Liberal pickup new district.			
Source: Elections Ontario
