= Peter Lawson (politician) =

Canadian politician

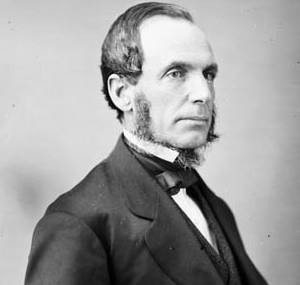
Peter Lawson Source: Library and Archives Canada

Peter Lawson (January 10, 1821 – March 22, 1911) was an Ontario political figure. He represented Norfolk South in the 1st Canadian Parliament as a Liberal member.

He was born in Woodstock, Connecticut in 1821, the son of Thomas Lawson and Lucy Johnson, and came to Upper Canada with his family in 1830. He worked as a tanner in Port Dover. In 1842, he married Sarah Ladd. Lawson served as reeve for Woodhouse Township in Norfolk County. He died in Port Dover at the age of 90.

1867 Canadian federal election: South Riding of Norfolk
Party	Candidate	Votes
Liberal	Peter Lawson	1,050
Unknown	N. O. Walker	969
Eligible voters		2,468
Source: Canadian Parliamentary Guide, 1871
