= Alexander McCall =

Canadian politician

Alexander McCall (21 December 1844 – 10 June 1925) was a Canadian lumber merchant and political figure in Ontario, Canada. He represented Norfolk in the House of Commons of Canada from 1908 as a Conservative until the 1911 federal election in which he was defeated. McCall sat for Simcoe division in the Senate of Canada from 1913 to 1925 following his appointment to the upper house by Robert Borden.

He was born in Charlotteville, Canada West, the son of David McCall and Harriet Mann, and was educated in Norfolk County. In 1872, he married Sarah McInnes. McCall was mayor of Simcoe from 1893 to 1894. He was defeated when he ran for reelection to the House of Commons in 1911. McCall was called to the Senate on 26 May 1913, and died in office in Simcoe at the age of 84.
