= Waterford, Ontario =

Community of Norfolk County, Ontario, Canada

Coordinates: 42.931856°N 80.289459°W

Waterford
- Unincorporated hamlet in Norfolk County
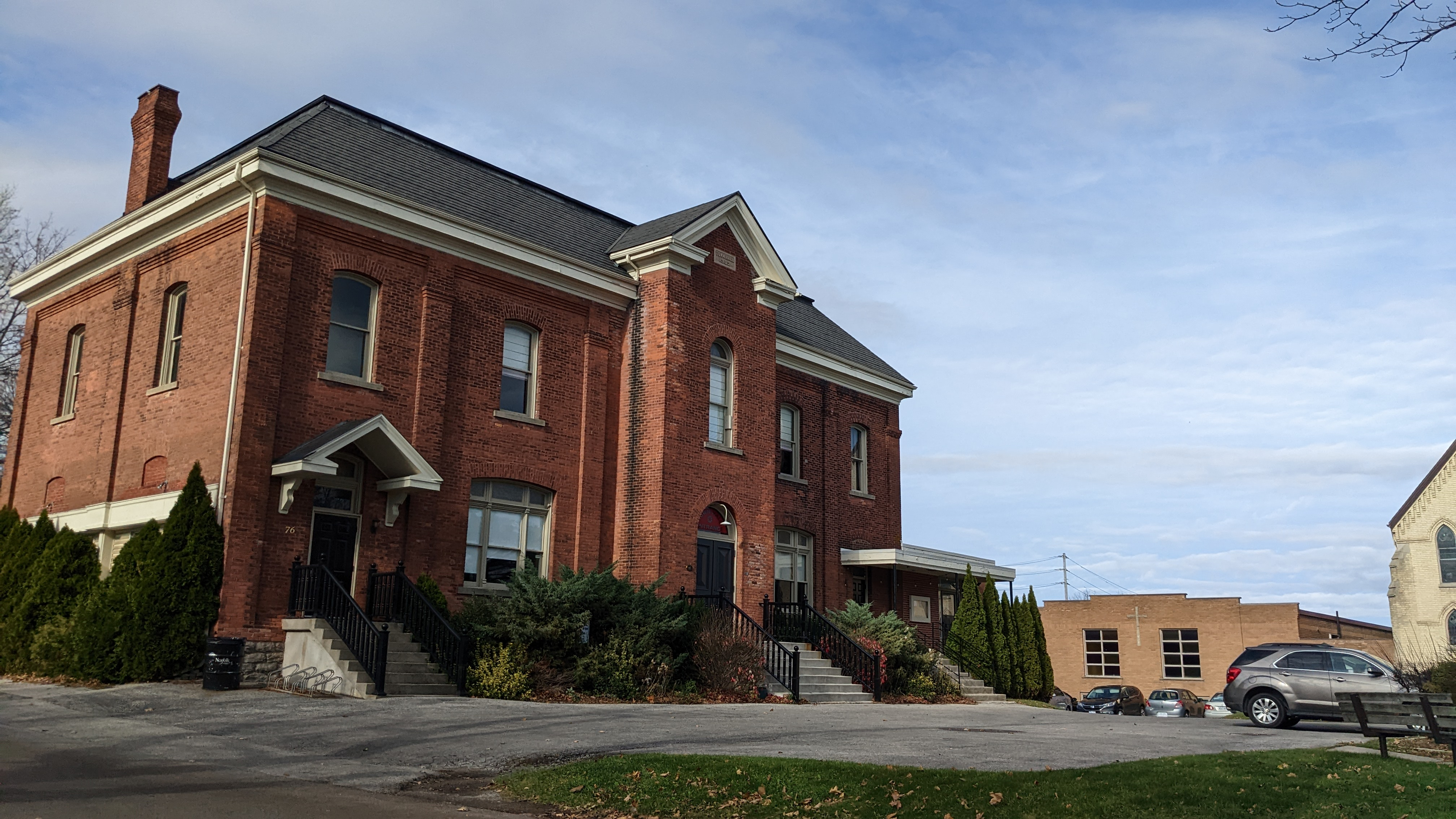

- Location in southern Ontario
- Country: Canada
- Province: Ontario
- Amalgamated into Norfolk County: 2001 (Single-tier municipality)

Government
  - Mayor of Norfolk County: Amy Martin
  - Governing Body: The Council of The Corporation of Norfolk County
  - MPs: Leslyn Lewis (Conservative)
  - MPPs: Bobbi Ann Brady (Independent)

Population (2016)
  - Total: 3,132
- Time zone: UTC-5 (EST)
  - Summer (DST): UTC-4 (EDT)
- Forward sortation area: N0E
- Area code: 519 / 226 /
- Website: norfolkcounty.ca

Waterford is one of the Communities in Norfolk County, Ontario and had a population of 3,132 at the time of the 2016 Census. Waterford is going through a major construction boom with new housing subdivisions in both the north and south ends of town. Any open lots within established neighbourhoods are being filled in as well. A new apartment complex was proposed on the old grain silo land parcel next to Shadow Lake and Waterford heritage trail.

Antiques from different historical eras can be purchased from downtown antique stores. Norfolk FS (formerly known as the Norfolk Co-Operative) also holds a major base of operations here, which provides chemicals and most agriculture-related goods in addition to animal feed for local farmers. The Townsend Farmers' Mutual Fire Insurance Company has its headquarters in Waterford where it was started by farmers in 1879. As a mutual insurance company, every one of its customers is also a member and owner.

Close access to railway and air travel allows local travellers to maintain a low-cost "home base" in Waterford while having access to regional, national and international destinations.

== Summary ==
Founded in 1794, this community was first established as a saw and grist mill community. Paul Averill would operate the first successful grist mill venture during the start of the 19th century. The earlier names of the settlement included: Sayles' Mills, Sovereign's Mills and Lodersvile, before finally becoming Waterford in 1826 when they opened their first post office. Waterford became the northernmost marketplace in Norfolk County; complementing Simcoe as its centre marketplace. The village would become incorporated in 1878 when its population reached 1100 people.

Settlement of this area, with rich soil and large forests, within Townsend Township, started in 1794, and by 1782 Paul Averill was operating saw and grist-mills on Nanticoke Creek. By 1851, Waterford contained the Township Hall and many industries, including a large agricultural implements factory built by James Green. The railway arrived in 1871 and helped increase growth (to 1100) by the time the village was incorporated in 1871. Historic plaques in the community provide further details.

The local high school is called Waterford District High School and its teams are collectively called the Wolves. Founded in 1892, its sports teams were once collectively called the Redmen. The high school started out with only 58 students. A high school rugby program was initiated in 1991 by teacher David Zeldon and is considered to be one of the most dominant teams in the NSSAA boys' rugby league.

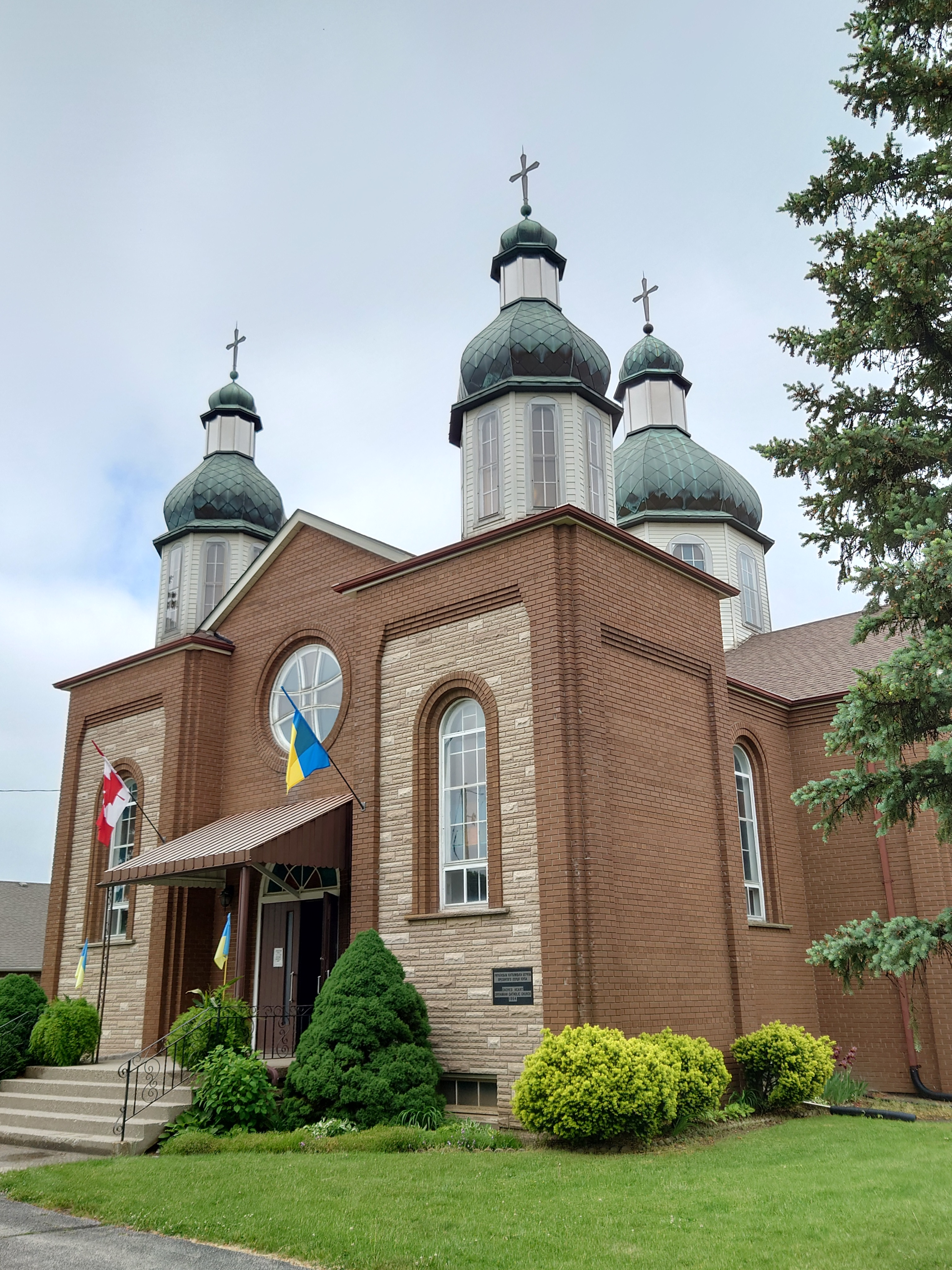
Sacred Heart Ukrainian Catholic Church, opened in 1964

This community sits on the old Canada Southern Railway, preceding various other rail company takeovers, the latest of which was by CN/CP. The now idle line passes through Ontario between Buffalo, New York and Detroit, Michigan. An electric railway, Canadian Pacific's Lake Erie and Northern Railway, once operated in Waterford; the official fare from Galt to Waterford was a mere C$1.05 ($14.13 in the day's gold-money) while taking it to nearby Simcoe cost C$1.25 plus taxes (C$43.25 in today's gold-money equivalent at US$1250 per ounce and C$1.33 to US$1 exchange rate). The Lake Erie and Northern Railway had discontinued passenger service in April, 1955. 1961 saw the overhead wire de-energised and trains run using CP diesel-electric locomotives. The Lake Erie and Northern's line between Brantford and Waterford was abandoned in 1965. CP trains then ran between Brantford and Waterford on the Toronto Hamilton and Buffalo Railway, crossing over the Canada Southern via crossovers onto a connecting track to rejoin the LE&N just south of the steel bridge over the CASO. The TH&B also ran passenger train service between Hamilton and Waterford, that service being discontinued in 1954.

The area surrounding the town is primarily agricultural land, with tomatoes, tobacco and corn among the chief crops. Area farmers generally suffered from the decline of the tobacco industry, but natural health and organic crops are being explored, such as ginseng, as well as lavender and wine grapes. Many non-essential services and businesses would traditionally close their operations one hour earlier on Wednesday afternoons in order to allow workers to have time with their families; this tradition would cease during the 1970s as extra demand for services and economic recessions would force most business owners to adopt a seven-day work week.

In 1979, a freak tornado swept through Waterford, devastating trees, homes, and public property.

=== Pumpkinfest ===
During the middle of October, locals celebrate Pumpkinfest. Pumpkinfest was originally inspired by a festival of the same name in Connecticut, and brought over by Blanche Deveraox. A huge "pumpkin pyramid" of 1500 carved pumpkins is an annual tradition for this fall festival. A car show and a soap box derby are some of the other attractions at Pumpkinfest. Many stores, restaurants, banks and the LCBO dealership observe this festival as a boost to the local economy.

== Climate ==
Waterford traditionally belongs to the humid continental climate zone, even with the recent epidemic of mild winters and extremely warm and dry summers. As in all communities, towns and cities throughout the world, global warming due to human industrial activity has drastically altered the climate of Waterford over the decades (source?)

== Notable people ==
- Elaine Chuli, Professional Women's Hockey League player
- Nelson Emerson, retired National Hockey League player
- Douglas Glover, Canadian author
- Paul Hellyer, Canadian engineer, politician, writer and commentator
- Win Kellum, retired Major League Baseball player
- Walker Powell, Canadian businessman, militia officer and political figure
- Robin Shulman, author of Eat the City: A Tale of the Fishers, Foragers, Butchers, Farmers, Poultry Minders, Sugar Refiners, Cane Cutters, Beekeepers, Winemakers, and Brewers Who Built New York
- Chester Samuel Walters, Canadian politician and bureaucrat
- Fred Eaglesmith, Canadian singer, songwriter, performer
