= Elgin East (provincial electoral district) =

Ontario electoral district

Defunct provincial electoral district
- Legislature: Legislative Assembly of Ontario
- District created: 1867
- District abolished: 1933
- First contested: 1867
- Last contested: 1929

Elgin East was an electoral riding in Ontario, Canada. It was created in 1867 at the time of confederation and was abolished in 1933 before the 1934 election.

== Members of Provincial Parliament ==
Elgin East
Assembly	Years	Member	Party
1st	1867–1871	Daniel Luton	Conservative
2nd	1871–1874	John Henry Wilson	Liberal
3rd	1875–1879	John Henry Wilson	Liberal
4th	1879–1883	Thomas McIntyre Nairn	Liberal
5th	1883–1886	Charles Oaks Ermatinger	Conservative
6th	1886–1888	Thomas McIntyre Nairn	Liberal
6th	1888–1890	James Charles Dance	Liberal
7th	1890–1894	Henry Thomas Godwin	Conservative
8th	1894–1898	Charles Andrew Brower (Note: Brower was removed from office on April 1, 1899 after an electoral appeal but was re-elected in a by-election on December 12, 1899.)	Conservative
9th	1898–1902	Charles Andrew Brower	Conservative
10th	1902–1904	Charles Andrew Brower	Conservative
11th	1905–1908	Charles Andrew Brower	Conservative
12th	1908–1911	Charles Andrew Brower	Conservative
13th	1911–1914	Charles Andrew Brower	Conservative
14th	1914–1919	Charles Andrew Brower	Conservative
15th	1919–1923	Malcolm MacVicar	United Farmers
16th	1923–1926	Michael McKnight	Conservative
17th	1926–1928	Edward Blake Miller	Liberal
18th	1929–1934	Herbert James Davis	Conservative
Sourced from the Ontario Legislative Assembly
Merged into Elgin before 1934 election

== Election results ==
1929 Ontario general election
Party	Candidate	Votes	%	±%
Conservative	Herbert James Davis	4,068	51.83	+7.34
Liberal	Edward Blake Miller	3,780	48.17	–7.34
Total valid votes		7,848	99.52	
Total rejected ballots		38	0.48	+0.03
Turnout		7,886	76.56	+5.08
Eligible voters		10,300		
Conservative gain from Liberal		Swing		+7.34
Source: Elections Ontario

1926 Ontario general election
Party	Candidate	Votes	%	±%
Liberal	Edward Blake Miller	4,122	55.51	+26.85
Conservative	Michael McKnight	3,304	44.49	+0.15
Total valid votes		7,426	99.54	
Total rejected ballots		34	0.46	–0.12
Turnout		7,460	71.48	+10.11
Eligible voters		10,436		
Liberal gain from Conservative		Swing		+13.35
Source: Elections Ontario

1923 Ontario general election
Party	Candidate	Votes	%	±%
Conservative	Michael McKnight	2,968	44.34	+3.81
Liberal	James Charles Dance	1,918	28.66	–
United Farmers	William F. Smith	1,807	27.00	–32.47
Total valid votes		6,693	99.42	
Total rejected ballots		39	0.58	–2.25
Turnout		6,732	61.37	–15.93
Eligible voters		10,969		
Conservative gain from United Farmers		Swing		+1.91
Source: Elections Ontario

1919 Ontario general election
Party	Candidate	Votes	%	±%
United Farmers	Malcolm MacVicar	4,937	59.47	–
Conservative	Thomas Merritt Moore	3,365	40.53	–13.48
Total valid votes		8,302	97.17	
Total rejected ballots		242	2.83	+2.57
Turnout		8,544	77.31	–10.50
Eligible voters		11,052		
United Farmers gain from Conservative		Swing		–
Source: Elections Ontario

1914 Ontario general election
Party	Candidate	Votes	%	±%
Conservative	Charles Andrew Brower	2,234	54.01	–3.90
Liberal	Nathan S. Cornell	1,902	45.99	+3.90
Total valid votes		4,136	99.73	
Total rejected ballots		11	0.27	–0.52
Turnout		4,147	87.80	+18.52
Eligible voters		4,723		
Conservative hold		Swing		–3.90
Source: Elections Ontario

1911 Ontario general election
Party	Candidate	Votes	%	±%
Conservative	Charles Andrew Brower	2,127	57.91	+1.82
Liberal	Daniel McIntyre	1,546	42.09	–1.82
Total valid votes		3,673	99.22	
Total rejected ballots		29	0.78	+0.17
Turnout		3,702	69.29	–17.41
Eligible voters		5,343		
Conservative hold		Swing		+1.82
Source: Elections Ontario

1908 Ontario general election
Party	Candidate	Votes	%	±%
Conservative	Charles Andrew Brower	2,289	56.09	+4.67
Liberal	Charles Wesley Wonnacott	1,792	43.91	–4.67
Total valid votes		4,081	99.39	
Total rejected ballots		25	0.61	+0.15
Turnout		4,106	86.70	+1.04
Eligible voters		4,736		
Conservative hold		Swing		+4.67
Source: Elections Ontario

1905 Ontario general election
Party	Candidate	Votes	%	±%
Conservative	Charles Andrew Brower	2,249	51.42	+0.10
Liberal	James Charles Dance	2,125	48.58	–0.10
Total valid votes		4,374	99.54	
Total rejected ballots		20	0.46	–0.06
Turnout		4,394	85.65	+6.91
Eligible voters		5,130		
Conservative hold		Swing		+0.10
Source: Elections Ontario

1902 Ontario general election
Party	Candidate	Votes	%	±%
Conservative	Charles Andrew Brower	2,177	51.32	+0.82
Liberal	C. Sinclair	2,065	48.68	–0.82
Total valid votes		4,242	99.48	
Total rejected ballots		22	0.52	+0.52
Turnout		4,264	78.74	–
Eligible voters		5,415		
Conservative hold		Swing		+0.82
Source: Elections Ontario

Ontario provincial by-election, December 12, 1899 Void Election
Party	Candidate	Votes	%	±%
Conservative	Charles Andrew Brower	2,164	50.50	+0.18
Liberal	D. McIntyre	2,121	49.50	–0.18
Total valid votes		4,285	100.00	
Total rejected ballots		–		
Turnout		4,285	–	–
Eligible voters				
Conservative hold		Swing		+0.18
Source: Elections Ontario

1898 Ontario general election
Party	Candidate	Votes	%	±%
Conservative	Charles Andrew Brower	2,267	50.32	+6.60
Liberal	Daniel McIntyre	2,238	49.68	+15.37
Total valid votes		4,505	99.40	
Total rejected ballots		27	0.60	+0.31
Turnout		4,532	82.75	+8.39
Eligible voters		5,477		
Conservative hold		Swing		–4.38
Source: Elections Ontario

1894 Ontario general election
Party	Candidate	Votes	%	±%
Conservative	Charles Andrew Brower	1,700	43.72	–7.77
Liberal	James Charles Dance	1,334	34.31	–14.20
Liberal-Patrons of Industry	W. Ford	854	21.97	–
Total valid votes		3,888	99.72	
Total rejected ballots		11	0.28	–0.02
Turnout		3,899	74.35	+0.06
Eligible voters		5,244		
Conservative hold		Swing		+3.22
Source: Elections Ontario

1890 Ontario general election
Party	Candidate	Votes	%	±%
Conservative	Henry Thomas Godwin	2,038	51.49	+2.67
Liberal	James Charles Dance	1,920	48.51	–2.67
Total valid votes		3,958	99.70	
Total rejected ballots		12	0.30	+0.30
Turnout		3,970	74.29	–
Eligible voters		5,344		
Conservative gain from Liberal		Swing		+2.67
Source: Elections Ontario

Ontario provincial by-election, October 11, 1888 Death of Thomas McIntyre Nairn
Party	Candidate	Votes	%	±%
Liberal	James Charles Dance	1,862	51.18	–0.05
Conservative	Mr. Marlatt	1,776	48.82	+0.05
Total valid votes		3,638	100.00	
Total rejected ballots		–		
Turnout		3,638	–	–
Eligible voters				
Liberal hold		Swing		–0.05
Source: Elections Ontario

1886 Ontario general election
Party	Candidate	Votes	%	±%
Liberal	Thomas McIntyre Nairn	1,873	51.23	+2.18
Conservative	Mr. Marlatt	1,783	48.77	–2.18
Total valid votes		3,656	99.65	
Total rejected ballots		13	0.35	+0.02
Turnout		3,669	67.51	+1.48
Eligible voters		5,435		
Liberal gain from Conservative		Swing		+2.18
Source: Elections Ontario

1883 Ontario general election
Party	Candidate	Votes	%	±%
Conservative	Charles Oaks Ermatinger	2,416	50.95	+2.44
Liberal	Thomas McIntyre Nairn	2,326	49.05	–2.44
Total valid votes		4,742	99.66	
Total rejected ballots		16	0.34	+0.34
Turnout		4,758	66.03	–0.68
Eligible voters		7,206		
Conservative gain from Liberal		Swing		+2.44
Source: Elections Ontario

1879 Ontario general election
Party	Candidate	Votes	%	±%
Liberal	Thomas McIntyre Nairn	2,275	51.49	+1.18
Conservative	S. Day	2,143	48.51	−1.18
Total valid votes		4,418	66.71	−7.14
Eligible voters		6,623		
Liberal hold		Swing		+1.18
Source: Elections Ontario

1875 Ontario general election
Party	Candidate	Votes	%	±%
Liberal	John Henry Wilson	1,924	50.31	−2.80
Conservative	T. Arkell	1,900	49.69	+2.80
Turnout		3,824	73.85	+10.03
Eligible voters		5,178		
Liberal hold		Swing		−2.80
Source: Elections Ontario

1871 Ontario general election
Party	Candidate	Votes	%	±%
Liberal	John Henry Wilson	1,442	53.11	+3.55
Conservative	Daniel Luton	1,273	46.89	−3.55
Turnout		2,715	63.82	−11.65
Eligible voters		4,254		
Liberal gain from Conservative		Swing		+3.55
Source: Elections Ontario

1867 Ontario general election
Party	Candidate	Votes	%
Conservative	Daniel Luton	1,431	50.44
Liberal	Thomas McIntyre Nairn	1,406	49.56
Total valid votes		2,837	75.47
Eligible voters		3,759	
Conservative pickup new district.			
Source: Elections Ontario
