= Elgin East =

Elgin East may refer to:

- Elgin East (federal electoral district)
- Elgin East (provincial electoral district)
