= Charles Dance (disambiguation) =

Charles Dance (born 1946) is an English actor, screenwriter and director.

Charles Dance may also refer to:

- Charles Dance (playwright) (1794–1863), English playwright
- Charles Webb Dance (1785–1844), British Army officer and motoring pioneer
- James Charles Dance, Canadian politician
