= 13th Canadian Parliament =

1918–1921 national legislative term

- Majority parliament
- Mar. 18, 1918 – Oct. 4, 1921

Parliament leaders
- Prime minister: Robert Borden; Oct. 10, 1911 – Jul. 10, 1920
- Arthur Meighen; Jul. 10, 1920 – Dec. 29, 1921
- Cabinets: 10th Canadian Ministry; 11th Canadian Ministry
- Leader of the Opposition: Wilfrid Laurier; October 10, 1911 – February 17, 1919
- Daniel Duncan McKenzie; February 17, 1919 – August 7, 1919
- William Lyon Mackenzie King; August 7, 1919 – December 28, 1921

Party caucuses
- Government: Unionist
- Opposition: Laurier Liberals

House of Commons
- Seating arrangements of the House of Commons
- Speaker of the Commons: Edgar Nelson Rhodes; January 18, 1917 – March 5, 1922

Senate
- Speaker of the Senate: Joseph Bolduc; June 3, 1916 – February 6, 1922
- Government Senate leader: James Alexander Lougheed; October 10, 1911 – December 28, 1921
- Opposition Senate leader: Hewitt Bostock; March 19, 1914 – January 1, 1919; January 1, 1920 – December 28, 1921
- Raoul Dandurand; January 1, 1919 – December 31, 1919

Sovereign
- Monarch: George V May 6, 1910 – January 20, 1936
- Governor general: Victor Cavendish; November 11, 1916 – August 2, 1921
- Julian Byng; August 2, 1921 – August 5, 1926

Sessions
- 1st session March 18, 1918 – May 24, 1918
- 2nd session February 20, 1919 – July 7, 1919
- 3rd session September 1, 1919 – November 10, 1919
- 4th session February 26, 1920 – July 1, 1920
- 5th session February 14, 1921 – June 4, 1921
| ← 12th | → 14th |

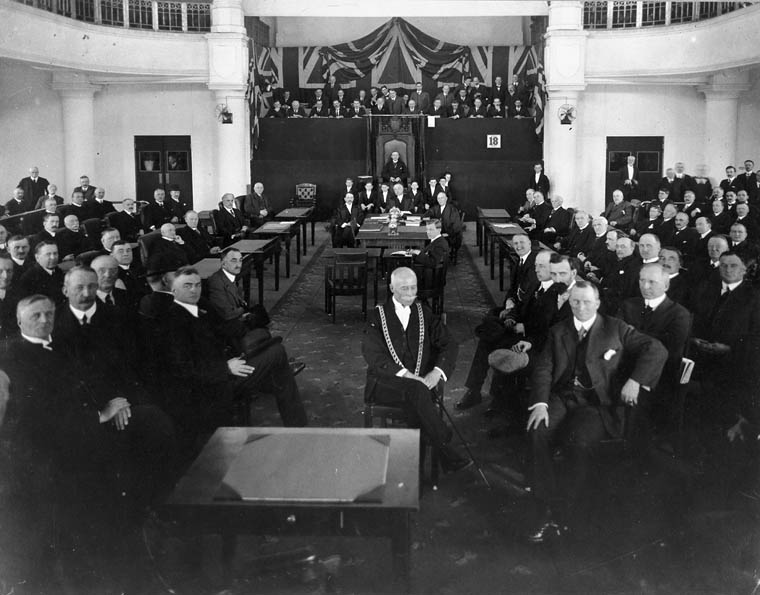
First Session of the 13th Parliament, held in the Victoria Museum Ottawa, Ontario

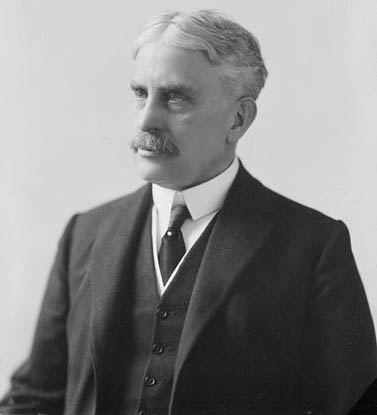
Sir Robert Borden was Prime Minister during most of the 13th Canadian Parliament.

The 13th Canadian Parliament was in session from March 18, 1918, until October 4, 1921. The membership was set by the 1917 federal election on December 17, 1917, and it changed only somewhat due to resignations and by-elections until it was dissolved prior to the 1921 election.

It was controlled by a Unionist Party majority first under Prime Minister Sir Robert Borden and the 10th Canadian Ministry, and after July 10, 1920, by Prime Minister Arthur Meighen and the 11th Canadian Ministry. The Official Opposition was the Laurier Liberal Party, led first by Wilfrid Laurier, and then by Daniel McKenzie and William Lyon Mackenzie King consecutively.

The Speaker was Edgar Nelson Rhodes. See also List of Canadian electoral districts 1914-1924 for a list of the ridings in this parliament.

There were five sessions of the 13th Parliament; the third was opened by the Prince of Wales (later Edward VIII):

| Session | Start | End |
|---|---|---|
| 1st | March 18, 1918 | May 24, 1918 |
| 2nd | February 20, 1919 | July 7, 1919 |
| 3rd | September 1, 1919 | November 10, 1919 |
| 4th | February 26, 1920 | July 1, 1920 |
| 5th | February 14, 1921 | June 4, 1921 |

== List of members ==
The following is a full list of members of the thirteenth Parliament listed first by province, then by electoral district.

Key:

- Party leaders are italicized.
- Parliamentary secretaries is indicated by "‡".
- Cabinet ministers are in **boldface**.
- The Prime Minister is **both**.
- The Speaker is indicated by "(†)".

Electoral districts denoted by an asterisk (*) indicates that district was represented by two members.

=== Alberta ===
| Electoral district | Name | Party | First elected/previously elected | No. of terms |
|---|---|---|---|---|
| Battle River | William John Blair | Unionist | 1917 | 1st term |
| Bow River | Howard Hadden Halladay | Unionist | 1917 | 1st term |
| Calgary West | Thomas Tweedie | Unionist | 1917 | 1st term |
| East Calgary | Daniel Lee Redman | Unionist | 1917 | 1st term |
| Edmonton East | Henry Arthur Mackie | Unionist | 1917 | 1st term |
| Edmonton West | William Antrobus Griesbach | Unionist | 1917 | 1st term |
| Lethbridge | William Ashbury Buchanan | Unionist | 1911 | 2nd term |
| Macleod | Hugh Murray Shaw | Unionist | 1917 | 1st term |
| Medicine Hat | **Arthur Lewis Sifton** (died January 21, 1921) | Unionist | 1917 | 1st term |
| Medicine Hat | Robert Gardiner (by-election of 1921-06-27) | Progressive | 1921 | 1st term |
| Red Deer | Michael Clark | Unionist | 1908 | 3rd term |
| Red Deer | Michael Clark | Progressive | 1908 | 3rd term |
| Strathcona | James McCrie Douglas | Unionist | 1909 | 3rd term |
| Victoria | William Henry White | Laurier Liberals | 1908 | 3rd term |

=== British Columbia ===
| Electoral district | Name | Party | First elected/previously elected | No. of terms |
|---|---|---|---|---|
| Burrard | Sanford Johnston Crowe | Unionist | 1917 | 1st term |
| Cariboo | Frederick John Fulton | Unionist | 1917 | 1st term |
| Comox—Alberni | Herbert Sylvester Clements | Unionist | 1904, (Note: Kent West (Ontario)) 1911 | 3rd term* |
| Kootenay East | Saul Bonnell | Unionist | 1917 | 1st term |
| Kootenay West | Robert Francis Green | Unionist | 1912 | 2nd term |
| Nanaimo | John Charles McIntosh | Unionist | 1917 | 1st term |
| New Westminster | William Garland McQuarrie | Unionist | 1917 | 1st term |
| Skeena | Cyrus Wesley Peck | Unionist | 1917 | 1st term |
| Vancouver Centre | **Henry Herbert Stevens** | Unionist | 1911 | 2nd term |
| Vancouver South | Richard Clive Cooper | Unionist | 1917 | 1st term |
| Victoria City | **Simon Fraser Tolmie** (until February 8, 1919, ministerial appointment) | Unionist | 1917 | 1st term |
| Victoria City | **Simon Fraser Tolmie** (by-election of 1919-10-27) | Unionist | 1917 | 1st term |
| Westminster District | Frank Bainard Stacey | Unionist | 1917 | 1st term |
| Yale | **Martin Burrell** (until Parliamentary appointment) | Unionist | 1908 | 3rd term |
| Yale | John Armstrong Mackelvie (by-election of 1920-11-22) | Conservative | 1920 | 1st term |

=== Manitoba ===
| Electoral district | Name | Party | First elected/previously elected | No. of terms |
|---|---|---|---|---|
| Brandon | Howard Primrose Whidden | Unionist | 1917 | 1st term |
| Dauphin | Robert Cruise | Unionist | 1911 | 2nd term |
| Lisgar | Ferris Bolton | Unionist | 1917 | 1st term |
| Macdonald | Richard Coe Henders | Unionist | 1917 | 1st term |
| Marquette | **Thomas Alexander Crerar** | Unionist | 1917 | 1st term |
| Neepawa | Fred Langdon Davis | Unionist | 1917 | 1st term |
| Nelson | John Archibald Campbell | Unionist | 1917 | 1st term |
| Portage la Prairie | **Arthur Meighen** | Unionist | 1908 | 3rd term |
| Provencher | John Patrick Molloy | Laurier Liberals | 1908 | 3rd term |
| Selkirk | Thomas Hay | Unionist | 1917 | 1st term |
| Souris | Albert Ernest Finley | Unionist | 1917 | 1st term |
| Springfield | Robert Lorne Richardson | Unionist | 1896, (Note: Lisgar) 1917 | 3rd term* |
| Winnipeg Centre | George William Andrews | Unionist | 1917 | 1st term |
| Winnipeg North | Matthew Robert Blake | Unionist | 1917 | 1st term |
| Winnipeg South | George William Allan | Unionist | 1917 | 1st term |
| Winnipeg South | George William Allan | Independent | 1917 | 1st term |

=== New Brunswick ===
| Electoral district | Name | Party | First elected/previously elected | No. of terms |
|---|---|---|---|---|
| Charlotte | Thomas Aaron Hartt | Unionist | 1911 | 2nd term |
| Gloucester | Onésiphore Turgeon | Laurier Liberals | 1900 | 5th term |
| Kent | Auguste Théophile Léger | Laurier Liberals | 1917 | 1st term |
| Northumberland | William Stewart Loggie | Unionist | 1904 | 4th term |
| Restigouche—Madawaska | Pius Michaud | Laurier Liberals | 1907 | 4th term |
| Royal | Hugh Havelock McLean | Unionist | 1908 | 3rd term |
| St. John—Albert* | Stanley Edward Elkin | Unionist | 1917 | 1st term |
| St. John—Albert* | **Rupert Wilson Wigmore** | Unionist | 1917 | 1st term |
| St. John—Albert* | **Rupert Wilson Wigmore** (by-election of 1920-09-20) | Conservative | 1917 | 1st term |
| Victoria—Carleton | **Frank Broadstreet Carvell** | Unionist | 1904 | 4th term |
| Victoria—Carleton | Thomas Wakem Caldwell (by-election of 1919-10-27) | United Farmers | 1919 | 1st term |
| Westmorland | Arthur Bliss Copp | Laurier Liberals | 1915 | 2nd term |
| York—Sunbury | Harry Fulton McLeod | Unionist | 1913 | 2nd term |
| York—Sunbury | Richard Hanson (by-election of 1921-05-28) | Conservative | 1921 | 1st term |

=== Nova Scotia ===
| Electoral district | Name | Party | First elected/previously elected | No. of terms |
|---|---|---|---|---|
| Antigonish—Guysborough | John Howard Sinclair | Laurier Liberals | 1904 | 5th term |
| Cape Breton South and Richmond* | Robert Hamilton Butts | Unionist | 1917 | 1st term |
| Cape Breton South and Richmond* | John Carey Douglas | Unionist | 1917 | 1st term |
| Colchester | **Fleming Blanchard McCurdy** ‡ (until July 13, 1920, ministerial appointment) | Unionist | 1911 | 2nd term |
| Colchester | **Fleming Blanchard McCurdy** ‡ (by-election of 1920-09-20) | Nationalist Liberal | 1911 | 2nd term |
| Cumberland | Edgar Nelson Rhodes (†) | Unionist | 1908 | 3rd term |
| Digby and Annapolis | Avard Longley Davidson | Unionist | 1911 | 2nd term |
| Halifax* | **Alexander Kenneth Maclean** | Unionist | 1904 | 4th term |
| Halifax* | Peter Francis Martin | Unionist | 1917 | 1st term |
| Hants | Hadley Brown Tremain | Unionist | 1911 | 2nd term |
| Inverness | Alexander William Chisholm | Laurier Liberals | 1908 | 3rd term |
| Kings | **Robert Laird Borden** | Unionist | 1896, 1905 | 6th term* |
| Lunenburg | William Duff | Laurier Liberals | 1917 | 1st term |
| North Cape Breton and Victoria | Daniel Duncan McKenzie | Laurier Liberals | 1904, 1908 | 4th term* |
| Pictou | Alexander McGregor | Unionist | 1917 | 1st term |
| Shelburne and Queen's | William Stevens Fielding | Unionist | 1896, 1917 | 5th term* |
| Yarmouth and Clare | **Edgar Keith Spinney** | Unionist | 1917 | 1st term |

=== Ontario ===
| Electoral district | Name | Party | First elected/previously elected | No. of terms |
|---|---|---|---|---|
| Algoma East | George Brecken Nicholson | Unionist | 1917 | 1st term |
| Algoma West | Thomas Edward Simpson | Unionist | 1917 | 1st term |
| Brantford | William Foster Cockshutt | Unionist | 1904, 1911 | 3rd term* |
| Brant | John Harold | Unionist | 1917 | 1st term |
| Bruce North | Hugh Clark ‡ | Unionist | 1911 | 2nd term |
| Bruce South | Reuben Eldridge Truax | Laurier Liberals | 1913 | 2nd term |
| Carleton | George Boyce | Unionist | 1917 | 1st term |
| Dufferin | John Best | Unionist | 1909 | 3rd term |
| Dundas | Orren D. Casselman | Unionist | 1917 | 1st term |
| Durham | **Newton Rowell** | Unionist | 1917 | 1st term |
| Elgin East | David Marshall (died February 14, 1920) | Unionist | 1906 | 4th term |
| Elgin East | Sydney Smith McDermand (by-election of 1920-11-22) | United Farmers of Ontario | 1920 | 1st term |
| Elgin West | **Thomas Wilson Crothers** | Unionist | 1908 | 3rd term |
| Essex North | William Costello Kennedy | Laurier Liberals | 1917 | 1st term |
| Essex South | John Wesley Brien | Unionist | 1917 | 1st term |
| Fort William and Rainy River | **Robert James Manion** | Unionist | 1917 | 1st term |
| Frontenac | **John Wesley Edwards** | Unionist | 1908 | 3rd term |
| Glengarry and Stormont | John McMartin (died April 12, 1918) | Unionist | 1917 | 1st term |
| Glengarry and Stormont | John Wilfred Kennedy (by-election of 1919-10-27) | United Farmers of Ontario-Labour | 1919 | 1st term |
| Grenville | **John Dowsley Reid** | Unionist | 1896 | 6th term |
| Grey North | William Sora Middlebro | Unionist | 1908 | 3rd term |
| Grey Southeast | Robert James Ball | Unionist | 1911 | 2nd term |
| Haldimand | Francis Ramsey Lalor | Unionist | 1904 | 4th term |
| Halton | Robert King Anderson | Unionist | 1917 | 1st term |
| Hamilton East | **Sydney Chilton Mewburn** | Unionist | 1917 | 1st term |
| Hamilton West | Thomas Joseph Stewart | Unionist | 1900 | 5th term |
| Hastings East | Thomas Henry Thompson | Unionist | 1917 | 1st term |
| Hastings West | Edward Guss Porter | Unionist | 1902 | 5th term |
| Huron North | James Bowman | Unionist | 1911 | 2nd term |
| Huron South | Jonathan Joseph Merner | Unionist | 1911 | 2nd term |
| Kent | Archibald Blake McCoig | Laurier Liberals | 1908 | 3rd term |
| Kingston | William Folger Nickle (resigned July 7, 1919) | Unionist | 1911 | 2nd term |
| Kingston | **Henry Lumley Drayton** (by-election of 1919-10-20) | Conservative | 1919 | 1st term |
| Lambton East | Joseph Elijah Armstrong | Unionist | 1904 | 5th term |
| Lambton West | Frederick Forsyth Pardee | Unionist | 1905 | 4th term |
| Lanark | Adelbert Edward Hanna (died February 27, 1918) | Unionist | 1913 | 2nd term |
| Lanark | **John Alexander Stewart** (by-election of 1918-05-02) | Unionist | 1918 | 1st term |
| Leeds | **William Thomas White** | Unionist | 1911 | 2nd term |
| Lennox and Addington | William James Paul | Unionist | 1911 | 2nd term |
| Lincoln | James Dew Chaplin | Unionist | 1917 | 1st term |
| London | Hume Blake Cronyn | Unionist | 1917 | 1st term |
| Middlesex East | Samuel Francis Glass | Unionist | 1913 | 2nd term |
| Middlesex West | Duncan Campbell Ross | Laurier Liberals | 1909 | 3rd term |
| Muskoka | Peter McGibbon | Unionist | 1917 | 1st term |
| Nipissing | Charles Robert Harrison | Unionist | 1917 | 1st term |
| Norfolk | William Andrew Charlton | Unionist | 1911 | 2nd term |
| Northumberland | Charles Arthur Munson | Unionist | 1911 | 2nd term |
| Ontario North | Samuel Simpson Sharpe (died in office) | Unionist | 1908 | 3rd term |
| Ontario North | Robert Henry Halbert (by-election of 1919-12-09) | Independent | 1919 | 1st term |
| Ontario South | William Smith | Unionist | 1887, 1892, 1911 | 4th term* |
| Ottawa (City of)* | John Léo Chabot | Unionist | 1911 | 2nd term |
| Ottawa (City of)* | Alfred Ernest Fripp | Unionist | 1911 | 2nd term |
| Oxford North | Edward Walter Nesbitt | Unionist | 1908 | 3rd term |
| Oxford South | Donald Sutherland | Unionist | 1911 | 2nd term |
| Parkdale | Herbert Macdonald Mowat | Unionist | 1917 | 1st term |
| Parry Sound | James Arthurs | Unionist | 1908 | 3rd term |
| Peel | Samuel Charters | Unionist | 1917 | 1st term |
| Perth North | Hugh Boulton Morphy | Unionist | 1911 | 2nd term |
| Perth South | Michael Steele | Unionist | 1911 | 2nd term |
| Peterborough East | John Albert Sexsmith | Unionist | 1908 | 3rd term |
| Peterborough West | John Hampden Burnham (until resignation) | Unionist | 1911 | 2nd term |
| Peterborough West | George Newcombe Gordon (by-election of 1921-02-07) | Liberal | 1921 | 1st term |
| Port Arthur and Kenora | Francis Henry Keefer ‡ | Unionist | 1917 | 1st term |
| Prescott | Edmond Proulx | Laurier Liberals | 1904 | 4th term |
| Prince Edward | Bernard Rickart Hepburn | Unionist | 1911 | 2nd term |
| Renfrew North | Herbert John Mackie | Unionist | 1917 | 1st term |
| Renfrew South | Isaac Ellis Pedlow | Laurier Liberals | 1917 | 1st term |
| Russell | Charles Murphy | Laurier Liberals | 1904 | 4th term |
| Simcoe East | James Brockett Tudhope | Unionist | 1917 | 1st term |
| Simcoe North | John Allister Currie | Unionist | 1908 | 3rd term |
| Simcoe South | William Alves Boys | Unionist | 1912 | 2nd term |
| Timiskaming | **Francis Cochrane** (died in office) | Unionist | 1911 | 2nd term |
| Timiskaming | Angus McDonald (by-election of 1920-04-07) | Independent | 1920 | 1st term |
| Toronto Centre | **Edmund James Bristol** | Unionist | 1905 | 4th term |
| Toronto East | **Albert Edward Kemp** | Unionist | 1900, 1911 | 4th term* |
| Toronto North | **George Eulas Foster** | Unionist | 1882, (Note: King's/York (New Brunswick)) 1904 | 8th term* |
| Toronto South | Charles Sheard | Unionist | 1917 | 1st term |
| Toronto West | Horatio Clarence Hocken | Unionist | 1917 | 1st term |
| Victoria | Sam Hughes | Unionist | 1892 | 7th term |
| Waterloo North | William Daum Euler | Laurier Liberals | 1917 | 1st term |
| Waterloo South | Frank Stewart Scott | Unionist | 1915 | 2nd term |
| Welland | **Evan Eugene Fraser** | Unionist | 1917 | 1st term |
| Wellington North | William Aurelius Clarke | Unionist | 1911 | 2nd term |
| Wellington South | **Hugh Guthrie** | Unionist | 1900 | 5th term |
| Wentworth | Gordon Crooks Wilson | Unionist | 1911 | 2nd term |
| York East | Thomas Foster | Unionist | 1917 | 1st term |
| York North | John Alexander Macdonald Armstrong | Unionist | 1911 | 2nd term |
| York South | William Findlay Maclean | Unionist | 1892 | 7th term |
| York West | Thomas George Wallace | Unionist | 1908 | 3rd term |

=== Prince Edward Island ===
| Electoral district | Name | Party | First elected/previously elected | No. of terms |
|---|---|---|---|---|
| King's | James McIsaac | Unionist | 1917 | 1st term |
| Prince | Joseph Read (died April 6, 1919) | Laurier Liberals | 1917 | 1st term |
| Prince | William Lyon Mackenzie King (by-election of 1919-10-20) | Liberal | 1908, (Note: Waterloo North (Ontario)) 1919 | 2nd term* |
| Queen's* | Donald Nicholson | Unionist | 1911 | 2nd term |
| Queen's* | John Ewen Sinclair | Laurier Liberals | 1917 | 1st term |

=== Quebec ===
| Electoral district | Name | Party | First elected/previously elected | No. of terms |
|---|---|---|---|---|
| Argenteuil | Peter Robert McGibbon | Laurier Liberals | 1917 | 1st term |
| Bagot | Joseph Edmond Marcile | Laurier Liberals | 1898 | 6th term |
| Beauce | Henri Sévérin Béland | Laurier Liberals | 1902 | 5th term |
| Beauharnois | Louis-Joseph Papineau | Laurier Liberals | 1908 | 3rd term |
| Bellechasse | Charles Alphonse Fournier | Laurier Liberals | 1917 | 1st term |
| Berthier | Joseph-Charles-Théodore Gervais | Laurier Liberals | 1917 | 1st term |
| Bonaventure | Charles Marcil | Laurier Liberals | 1900 | 5th term |
| Brome | Andrew Ross McMaster | Laurier Liberals | 1917 | 1st term |
| Chambly—Verchères | Joseph Archambault | Laurier Liberals | 1917 | 1st term |
| Champlain | Arthur Lesieur Desaulniers | Laurier Liberals | 1917 | 1st term |
| Charlevoix—Montmorency | Pierre-François Casgrain | Laurier Liberals | 1917 | 1st term |
| Chicoutimi—Saguenay | Edmond Savard | Laurier Liberals | 1917 | 1st term |
| Châteauguay—Huntingdon | James Alexander Robb | Laurier Liberals | 1908 | 3rd term |
| Compton | Aylmer Byron Hunt | Laurier Liberals | 1904, 1917 | 3rd term* |
| Dorchester | **Lucien Cannon** | Laurier Liberals | 1917 | 1st term |
| Drummond—Arthabaska | Joseph Ovide Brouillard | Laurier Liberals | 1911 | 2nd term |
| Gaspé | Rodolphe Lemieux | Laurier Liberals | 1896 | 6th term |
| George-Étienne Cartier | Samuel William Jacobs | Laurier Liberals | 1917 | 1st term |
| Hochelaga | Joseph Edmond Lesage | Laurier Liberals | 1917 | 1st term |
| Hull | Joseph-Éloi Fontaine | Laurier Liberals | 1917 | 1st term |
| Jacques Cartier | David Arthur Lafortune | Laurier Liberals | 1896 | 6th term |
| Joliette | Jean-Joseph Denis | Laurier Liberals | 1917 | 1st term |
| Kamouraska | Ernest Lapointe (resigned October 14, 1919) | Laurier Liberals | 1904 | 5th term |
| Kamouraska | Charles Adolphe Stein (by-election of 1920-03-31) | Liberal | 1920 | 1st term |
| Labelle | Hyacinthe-Adélard Fortier | Laurier Liberals | 1917 | 1st term |
| Laprairie—Napierville | Roch Lanctôt | Laurier Liberals | 1904 | 4th term |
| L'Assomption—Montcalm | Paul-Arthur Séguin | Laurier Liberals | 1908 | 3rd term |
| Laurier—Outremont | Pamphile Réal Blaise Nugent Du Tremblay | Laurier Liberals | 1917 | 1st term |
| Laval—Two Mountains | Joseph Arthur Calixte Éthier | Laurier Liberals | 1896 | 6th term |
| Lévis | Joseph Boutin Bourassa | Laurier Liberals | 1911 | 2nd term |
| L'Islet | Joseph-Fernand Fafard | Laurier Liberals | 1917 | 1st term |
| Lotbinière | Thomas Vien | Laurier Liberals | 1917 | 1st term |
| Maisonneuve | Rodolphe Lemieux | Laurier Liberals | 1896 | 6th term |
| Maskinongé | Hormidas Mayrand | Laurier Liberals | 1903, 1917 | 4th term* |
| Matane | François Jean Pelletier | Laurier Liberals | 1917 | 1st term |
| Mégantic | Lucien Turcotte Pacaud | Laurier Liberals | 1911 | 2nd term |
| Missisquoi | William Frederic Kay | Laurier Liberals | 1911 | 2nd term |
| Montmagny | Joseph Bruno Aimé Miville Déchêne | Laurier Liberals | 1917 | 1st term |
| Nicolet | Arthur Trahan | Laurier Liberals | 1917 | 1st term |
| Pontiac | Frank S. Cahill | Laurier Liberals | 1917 | 1st term |
| Portneuf | Michel-Siméon Delisle | Laurier Liberals | 1900 | 5th term |
| Quebec County | Henri-Edgar Lavigueur | Laurier Liberals | 1917 | 1st term |
| Quebec East | Wilfrid Laurier (died February 17, 1919) | Laurier Liberals | 1874 | 11th term |
| Quebec East | Ernest Lapointe (by-election of 1919-10-27) | Laurier Liberals | 1904 | 5th term |
| Quebec South | Charles Gavan Power | Laurier Liberals | 1917 | 1st term |
| Quebec West | Georges Parent | Laurier Liberals | 1904, (Note: Montmorency) 1917 | 3rd term* |
| Richelieu | Arthur Cardin | Laurier Liberals | 1911 | 2nd term |
| Richmond—Wolfe | Edmund William Tobin | Laurier Liberals | 1900 | 5th term |
| Rimouski | Joseph-Émile-Stanislas-Émmanuel D'Anjou | Laurier Liberals | 1917 | 1st term |
| St. Ann | **Charles Joseph Doherty** | Unionist | 1908 | 3rd term |
| St. Antoine | Herbert Brown Ames | Unionist | 1904 | 4th term |
| St. Denis | Alphonse Verville | Laurier Liberals | 1906 | 4th term |
| St. Hyacinthe—Rouville | Louis Joseph Gauthier | Laurier Liberals | 1911 | 2nd term |
| St. James | Louis Audet Lapointe (died February 7, 1920) | Laurier Liberals | 1911 | 2nd term |
| St. James | Fernand Rinfret (by-election of 1920-04-07) | Liberal | 1920 | 1st term |
| St. Johns—Iberville | Marie Joseph Demers | Laurier Liberals | 1906 | 4th term |
| St. Lawrence—St. George | **Charles Ballantyne** | Unionist | 1917 | 1st term |
| St. Mary | Hermas Deslauriers | Laurier Liberals | 1917 | 1st term |
| Shefford | Georges Henri Boivin | Laurier Liberals | 1911 | 2nd term |
| Town of Sherbrooke | Francis N. McCrea | Laurier Liberals | 1911 | 2nd term |
| Stanstead | Willis Keith Baldwin | Laurier Liberals | 1917 | 1st term |
| Terrebonne | Jules-Édouard Prévost | Laurier Liberals | 1917 | 1st term |
| Three Rivers and St. Maurice | Jacques Bureau | Laurier Liberals | 1900 | 5th term |
| Témiscouata | Charles Arthur Gauvreau | Laurier Liberals | 1897 | 6th term |
| Vaudreuil—Soulanges | Gustave Benjamin Boyer | Laurier Liberals | 1904 | 4th term |
| Westmount—St. Henri | Joseph Alfred Leduc | Laurier Liberals | 1917 | 1st term |
| Wright | Emmanuel Berchmans Devlin | Laurier Liberals | 1904 | 4th term |
| Yamaska | Oscar Gladu (died December 5, 1920) | Laurier Liberals | 1917 | 1st term |
| Yamaska | Aimé Boucher (by-election of 1921-05-28) | Liberal | 1921 | 1st term |

=== Saskatchewan ===
| Electoral district | Name | Party | First elected/previously elected | No. of terms |
|---|---|---|---|---|
| Assiniboia | John Gillanders Turriff (until September 23, 1918, Senate appointment) | Unionist | 1904 | 4th term |
| Assiniboia | Oliver Robert Gould (by-election of 1919-10-27) | United Farmers | 1919 | 1st term |
| Battleford | Henry Oswald Wright | Unionist | 1917 | 1st term |
| Humboldt | Norman Lang | Unionist | 1917 | 1st term |
| Kindersley | Edward Thomas Wordon Myers | Unionist | 1917 | 1st term |
| Last Mountain | John Frederick Johnston | Unionist | 1917 | 1st term |
| Mackenzie | John Flaws Reid | Unionist | 1917 | 1st term |
| Maple Creek | John Archibald Maharg | Unionist | 1917 | 1st term |
| Moose Jaw | **James Alexander Calder** | Unionist | 1917 | 1st term |
| North Battleford | Charles Edwin Long | Unionist | 1917 | 1st term |
| Prince Albert | Andrew Knox | Unionist | 1917 | 1st term |
| Prince Albert | Andrew Knox | Progressive | 1917 | 1st term |
| Qu'Appelle | Levi Thomson | Unionist | 1911 | 2nd term |
| Regina | Walter Davy Cowan | Unionist | 1917 | 1st term |
| Saltcoats | Thomas MacNutt | Unionist | 1908 | 3rd term |
| Saskatoon | **James Robert Wilson** | Unionist | 1917 | 1st term |
| Swift Current | Ira Eugene Argue | Unionist | 1917 | 1st term |
| Weyburn | Richard Frederick Thompson | Unionist | 1917 | 1st term |

=== Yukon ===
| Electoral district | Name | Party | First elected/previously elected | No. of terms |
|---|---|---|---|---|
| Yukon | Alfred Thompson | Unionist | 1904, 1911 | 3rd term* |

== By-elections ==
| By-election | Date | Incumbent | Party | Winner | Party | Cause | Retained |
|---|---|---|---|---|---|---|---|
| Medicine Hat | June 27, 1921 | Arthur Lewis Sifton | Unionist | Robert Gardiner | Progressive | Death | No |
| Yamaska | May 28, 1921 | Oscar Gladu | Laurier Liberal | Aimé Boucher | Liberal | Death | Yes |
| York—Sunbury | May 28, 1921 | Harry Fulton McLeod | Unionist | Richard Hanson | Conservative | Death | Yes |
| Peterborough West | February 7, 1921 | John Hampden Burnham | Unionist | George Newcombe Gordon | Liberal | Resignation | No |
| Yale | November 22, 1920 | Martin Burrell | Unionist | John Armstrong MacKelvie | Conservative | Appointed Librarian of Parliament | Yes |
| Elgin East | November 22, 1920 | David Marshall | Unionist | Sydney Smith McDermand | United Farmers | Death | No |
| St. John—Albert | September 20, 1920 | Rupert Wilson Wigmore | Unionist | Rupert Wilson Wigmore | Conservative | Recontested upon appointment as Minister of Customs and Inland Revenue | Yes |
| Colchester | September 20, 1920 | Fleming Blanchard McCurdy | Unionist | Fleming Blanchard McCurdy | Nationalist Liberal | Recontested upon appointment as Minister of Public Works | Yes |
| Timiskaming | April 7, 1920 | Francis Cochrane | Unionist | Angus McDonald | Independent | Death | No |
| St. James | April 7, 1920 | Louis Audet Lapointe | Laurier Liberal | Fernand Rinfret | Liberal | Death | Yes |
| Kamouraska | March 31, 1920 | Ernest Lapointe | Laurier Liberal | Charles Adolphe Stein | Liberal | Resignation to contest Quebec East by-election | Yes |
| Ontario North | December 9, 1919 | Samuel Simpson Sharpe | Conservative | Robert Henry Halbert | Independent | Death | No |
| Quebec East | October 27, 1919 | Wilfrid Laurier | Laurier Liberal | Ernest Lapointe | Laurier Liberal | Death | Yes |
| Glengarry and Stormont | October 27, 1919 | John McMartin | Unionist | John Wilfred Kennedy | United Farmers | Death | No |
| Assiniboia | October 27, 1919 | John Gillanders Turriff | Unionist | Oliver Robert Gould | United Farmers | Called to the Senate | No |
| Victoria City | October 27, 1919 | Simon Fraser Tolmie | Unionist | Simon Fraser Tolmie | Unionist | Recontested upon appointment as Minister of Agriculture. | Yes |
| Prince | October 20, 1919 | Joseph Read | Liberal | William Lyon Mackenzie King | Liberal | Death | Yes |
| Kingston | October 20, 1919 | William Folger Nickle | Conservative | Henry Lumley Drayton | Unionist | Resignation | Yes |
| Victoria—Carleton | October 17, 1919 | Frank Carvell | Unionist | Thomas Wakem Caldwell | United Farmers | Appointed Chairman of the Board of Railway Commissioners | No |
| Lanark | May 2, 1918 | Adelbert Edward Hanna | Unionist | John Alexander Stewart | Unionist | Death | Yes |

== Parliamentary documents ==
=== Legislation ===
- Acts of the Parliament of Canada (13th Parliament, 1st Session, Chapter 1-52), 1918. Ottawa: Brown Chamberlin, Law Printer to the Queen's Most Excellent Majesty. 1918.
- Acts of the Parliament of Canada (13th Parliament, 1st Session, Chapter 53-96), 1918. Ottawa: Brown Chamberlin, Law Printer to the Queen's Most Excellent Majesty. 1918.
- Acts of the Parliament of Canada (13th Parliament, 2nd Session, Chapter 1-76), 1919. Ottawa: Brown Chamberlin, Law Printer to the Queen's Most Excellent Majesty. 1919.
- Acts of the Parliament of Canada (13th Parliament, 2nd Session, Chapter 77-154), 1919. Ottawa: Brown Chamberlin, Law Printer to the Queen's Most Excellent Majesty. 1919.
- Acts of the Parliament of Canada (13th Parliament, 3rd Session, Chapter 1-31), 1919. Ottawa: Brown Chamberlin, Law Printer to the Queen's Most Excellent Majesty. 1919.
- Acts of the Parliament of Canada (13th Parliament, 3rd Session, Chapter 32-36), 1919. Ottawa: Brown Chamberlin, Law Printer to the Queen's Most Excellent Majesty. 1919.
- Acts of the Parliament of Canada (13th Parliament, 4th Session, Chapter 1-73), 1920. Ottawa: Brown Chamberlin, Law Printer to the Queen's Most Excellent Majesty. 1920.
- Acts of the Parliament of Canada (13th Parliament, 4th Session, Chapter 74-203), 1920. Ottawa: Brown Chamberlin, Law Printer to the Queen's Most Excellent Majesty. 1920.
- Acts of the Parliament of Canada (13th Parliament, 5th Session, Chapter 1-54), 1921. Ottawa: Brown Chamberlin, Law Printer to the Queen's Most Excellent Majesty. 1921.
- Acts of the Parliament of Canada (13th Parliament, 5th Session, Chapter 55-198), 1921. Ottawa: Brown Chamberlin, Law Printer to the Queen's Most Excellent Majesty. 1921.
