= Julie Hamill =

- Born: 13 December 1971 (age 54); Baillieston
- Occupations: Author; Radio Presenter
- Years active: 2011–present
- Website: juliehamill.com

Julie Patricia Hamill (13 December 1971) is a London-based author and radio presenter. She presents London's Rock n Roll Book Club, Hamill Time on Boogaloo Radio and runs Manchester's Mozarmy Meet.

== Early life and career ==
Hamill spent a significant part of her early life, till she was 18, in Airdrie, North Lanarkshire. Her first employment was the selling and management of creative advertising campaigns for various companies including Saatchi & Saatchi.

== Writing ==
Her book, 15 Minutes With You: Interviews With Smiths/Morrissey Collaborators and Famous Fans (2015), is a compendium of interviews with individuals associated with the singer Morrissey taken over a three-year period. She first saw Morrissey live in 1985, when she was 13 years old. She has continued to publish interviews with people closely associated with Morrissey subsequently via her blog site.

In November 2017, Hamill released her second book, Frank – the first novel in a three-book series, Life and Soul, published by Saron Publishers. The trilogy was completed by Jackie in October 2019 and June in October 2023. Ian Rankin praised Frank as "an understated gem". The Daily Record described the second in the series as "a real love letter" to Hamill's home town.

== Other media ==
Hamill presented her own radio show on Boogaloo Radio, Hamill Time, between 2018 and 2023.

She currently contributes to Times Radio and Camden New Journal.

== "Moz Army" ==
Hamill founded the "Moz Army" online community, the popularity of which led to an annual "MozArmy Meet" being established by her in 2013. The Manchester Evening News has described this event as "one of the biggest fan gatherings of its kind in the world."

== The Rock and Roll Book Club ==
The Rock n Roll Book Club, established by Hamill in 2017, invites authors of music books to talk about and celebrate their work at the Dublin Castle music venue in Camden, London. Each event includes an on-stage interview, book signing and DJ set.

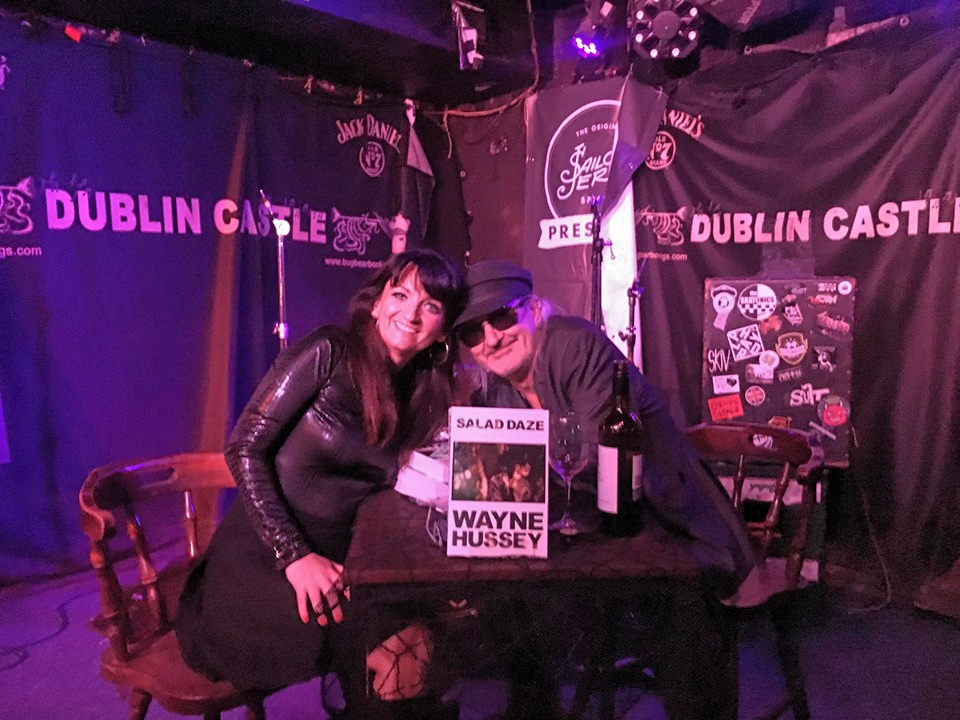
Julie Hamill & Wayne Hussey at the Rock and Roll Book Club (November, 2019).

== Bibliography ==
- Hamill, J. (2015) 15 Minutes With You: Interviews With Smiths/Morrissey Collaborators and Famous Fans", FBS Publishing
- Hamill, J. (2018) Frank (Life and Soul Book 1), Saron Publishers
- Hamill, J. (2019) Jackie (Life and Soul Book 2), Saron Publishers
- Hamill, J. (2023) June (Life and Soul Book 3), Saron Publishers
