= Edward Blake Miller =

Canadian politician from Ontario

Member of the Ontario Provincial Parliament for Elgin East
- In office December 1, 1926 – September 17, 1929
- Preceded by: Michael McKnight
- Succeeded by: Herbert James Davis

Personal details
- Party: Liberal

Edward Blake Miller was a Canadian politician from the Liberal Party of Ontario. He represented Elgin East in the Legislative Assembly of Ontario from 1926 to 1929.

== See also ==
- 17th Parliament of Ontario
