= James Charles Dance =

Canadian politician

Member of the Ontario Provincial Parliament for Elgin East
- In office October 26, 1888 – April 26, 1890
- Preceded by: Thomas McIntyre Nairn
- Succeeded by: Henry Thomas Godwin

Personal details
- Party: Liberal

James Charles Dance was a Canadian politician from Ontario. He was elected to the Legislative Assembly of Ontario in Elgin East in a by-election in 1888 .

== See also ==
- 6th Parliament of Ontario
