= Malcolm MacVicar (politician) =

Canadian politician from Ontario

Member of the Ontario Provincial Parliament for Elgin East
- In office October 20, 1919 – May 10, 1923
- Preceded by: Charles Andrew Brower
- Succeeded by: Michael McKnight

Personal details
- Born: October 14, 1877 South Dorchester, Elgin_County, Canada
- Died: September 6, 1941 (aged 63) London,_Ontario, Canada
- Party: United Farmers of Ontario
- Spouse: Ada Palethrope
- Children: 3

Malcolm MacVicar (October 14, 1877 – September 6, 1941) was a Canadian politician from the United Farmers of Ontario. He represented Elgin East in the Legislative Assembly of Ontario from 1919 to 1923.

== See also ==
- 15th Parliament of Ontario
