= Thomas McIntyre Nairn =

Canadian politician (1830–1888)

Thomas McIntyre Nairn (June 16, 1830 – June 1, 1888) was an Ontario businessman and political figure. He represented Elgin East in the Legislative Assembly of Ontario from 1879 to 1883 and from 1886 to 1888 as a Liberal member.

He was born in Bonhill, Dunbartonshire, Scotland in 1830, the son of James Nairn, and was educated there. In 1850, he came to Saint John, New Brunswick, moving to Aylmer, Canada West one year later. Nairn worked as a bookkeeper there, later becoming a general merchant and grain dealer and then a notary public. He married Delphine Van Patter in 1854. Nairn served 21 years on the council for Malahide Township and eight years on the council for Elgin County; he was county warden from 1866 to 1871. He served as a director on the board for the Canada Southern and Canada Air Line Railways. Nairn ran unsuccessfully in East Elgin in 1867 but then was elected in 1879. He was defeated by Charles Oaks Ermatinger in the 1883 general election but was elected again in 1886.

He died in office in 1888.

== Electoral history ==
1867 Ontario general election: Elgin East
Party	Candidate	Votes	%
Conservative	Daniel Luton	1,431	50.44
Liberal	Thomas McIntyre Nairn	1,406	49.56
Total valid votes		2,837	75.47
Eligible voters		3,759	
Conservative pickup new district.			
Source: Elections Ontario

1879 Ontario general election: Elgin East
Party	Candidate	Votes	%	±%
Liberal	Thomas McIntyre Nairn	2,275	51.49	+1.18
Conservative	Mr. Day	2,143	48.51	−1.18
Total valid votes		4,418	66.71	−7.14
Eligible voters		6,623		
Liberal hold		Swing		+1.18
Source: Elections Ontario
