= RedBoxBlue =

British pop rock band

RedBoxBlue were a British pop rock band originating from South London, England. The band formed in 2007 and its members were Jonathan Haselden (vocals, guitar), Sam Harrop (keyboards, vocals), Rob Bohner (guitar, vocals), Timo Simpson (guitar, vocals), Dominic Gianetta (bass) and Tom Murrow (drums). The group disbanded in 2009.

== 2006: Selling lines of songs ==
In September 2006, singer-songwriter Jonathan Haselden had the idea of raising his profile as an artist by selling lines of his songs to companies, in exchange for a percentage of future royalties. He began selling lines from the song "Rollercoaster" and successfully sold a line to four companies, Budweiser Budvar, T.G.I. Friday's, research company Fresh-Minds and The Tussauds Group for £1,000 each. In October the same year, Haselden attracted media attention when he auctioned a line from his song on the internet site eBay. He posted the line "And when you're lost you'll always be found" with a starting bid of 6p and a mystery American buyer won the auction with a bid of £11,100. In doing this, Haselden became the first unsigned artist to sell a line from an unreleased song for a sum of money with consequential value.

== 2007: The band ==
In January 2007, following feedback from record companies, Haselden formed a band to showcase his material in a different way. Sam Harrop, Rob Bohner, Timo Simpson, Neil Raymond and Dom Joseph joined Haselden to form the band 'Haselden'. Between January and April 2007, Haselden performed at London venues, such as The Half Moon, Putney; Dublin Castle, Camden and The Troubadour, London. In April 2007, bassist Neil Raymond and drummer Dom Joseph left the band and were replaced by Dominic Gianetta and Sam Wilson respectively. Drummer Sam Wilson was replaced by Tom Marrow in the ensuing weeks. From this point onwards, the six-piece started performing under its new name 'RedBoxBlue'. In June 2007, RedBoxBlue performed their first gig under their new name at the Hard Rock Cafe in Mayfair, raising the band's profile. The band continued to play regular gigs at London venues for the coming months to build up a local fan-base. In August the band recorded the songs "I Try", "Brand New Day" and "Carry On What" at the Strong Room Studios in Shoreditch. In January 2008, the song "I Try" was mixed at the Town House studios in Shepherd's Bush and was released independently as a download-only single by the band in June 2008.

== 2008: Facebook gigs ==
In June 2008, RedBoxBlue became the first ever band to stream online gigs through the social networking site, Facebook. Entitled 'Five Nights On Facebook', this was a series of online gigs on consecutive nights streamed around the world using a streaming application made by Kyte, and was filmed and recorded live from a studio in Clapham. Over 10,000 people were reported to have watched the online gigs, which were also streamed through Myspace, and through Kyte's own website.
