= Daniel Luton =

Canadian politician

Daniel Luton (October 19, 1821 – December 26, 1901) was an Ontario farmer and political figure. He represented Elgin East in the Legislative Assembly of Ontario as a Conservative member from 1867 to 1871.

He was born in Yarmouth Township in 1821, the son of immigrants from England. He served on the council for Elgin County, serving several terms as reeve for the township in 1860 and was warden for the county in 1863. Luton and his family later moved from their farm to St. Thomas.

== Electoral history ==
1867 Ontario general election: Elgin East
| Party | Candidate | Votes | % |
|---|---|---|---|
| Conservative | Daniel Luton | 1,431 | 50.44 |
| Liberal | Thomas McIntyre Nairn | 1,406 | 49.56 |
| Total valid votes | | 2,837 | 75.47 |
| Eligible voters | | 3,759 | |
| Conservative pickup new district. | | | |
Source: Elections Ontario

1871 Ontario general election: Elgin East
| Party | Candidate | Votes | % | ±% |
|---|---|---|---|---|
| Liberal | John Henry Wilson | 1,442 | 53.11 | +3.55 |
| Conservative | Daniel Luton | 1,273 | 46.89 | −3.55 |
| Turnout | | 2,715 | 63.82 | −11.65 |
| Eligible voters | | 4,254 | | |
| Liberal gain from Conservative | | Swing | | +3.55 |
Source: Elections Ontario
