= McDermand =

McDermand may refer to:

- Bob McDermand, founder of Moustrak, the first commercial manufacturer of mousepads
- Mark McDermand, murderer of his mother and brother in 1980 and at one time a suspect in other murders, at least one committed by serial killer David Carpenter
- Sydney Smith McDermand (1868–1961), Canadian politician
- Wayne McDermand, on the 1970 All-Southwest Conference football team
- Lake McDermand, in or near Muir Pass, California
- a cultivar of Pyrus ussuriensis, a species of flowering plant

== See also ==
- Frances McDormand (born 1957), American actress and film producer born Cynthia Ann Smith
