= Norfolk—Elgin =

Former federal electoral district in Ontario, Canada

Ontario electoral district

Defunct federal electoral district
- Legislature: House of Commons
- District created: 1924
- District abolished: 1933
- First contested: 1925
- Last contested: 1930

Norfolk—Elgin was a federal electoral district represented in the House of Commons of Canada from 1925 to 1935. It was located in the province of Ontario. This riding was created in 1924 from Norfolk riding and parts of Elgin East riding.

It consisted of the county of Norfolk and the townships of Bayham and Malahide in the county of Elgin.

The electoral district was abolished in 1933 when it was redistributed between Norfolk and Elgin ridings.

== Members of Parliament ==
This riding has elected the following members of Parliament:

| Parliament | Years | Member | Party |
|---|---|---|---|
Riding created from Norfolk and Elgin East
| 15th | 1925–1926 | John Lawrence Stansell | Conservative |
| 16th | 1926–1930 | William Horace Taylor | Liberal |
| 17th | 1930–1935 | William Horace Taylor | Liberal |
Riding dissolved into Norfolk and Elgin

== Election history ==
1925 Canadian federal election: Norfolk—Elgin
| Party | Candidate | Votes |
|---|---|---|
| Conservative | John Lawrence Stansell | 8,145 |
| Progressive | George David Sewell | 7,183 |

1926 Canadian federal election: Norfolk—Elgin
| Party | Candidate | Votes |
|---|---|---|
| Liberal | William Horace Taylor | 8,568 |
| Conservative | John Lawrence Stansell | 8,512 |

1930 Canadian federal election: Norfolk—Elgin
| Party | Candidate | Votes |
|---|---|---|
| Liberal | William H. Taylor | 9,424 |
| Conservative | John Lawrence Stansell | 9,419 |

== See also ==
- List of Canadian electoral districts
- Historical federal electoral districts of Canada
