= Colin MacDougall =

Canadian politician

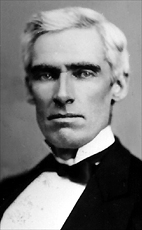

Member of the Canadian Parliament for Elgin East
- In office 1874–1878
- Preceded by: William Harvey
- Succeeded by: Thomas Arkell

Personal details
- Born: March 3, 1834 Aldborough, Upper Canada
- Died: October 25, 1901 (aged 67) St. Thomas, Ontario
- Party: Liberal
- Education: University of Michigan
- Occupation: lawyer

Colin MacDougall (March 3, 1834 in Aldborough, Upper Canada – October 25, 1901) was a politician and lawyer.

The son of Lachlin MacDougall and Sarah Ruthwen, he was educated locally and at the University of Michigan. In 1864, MacDougall married Catherine Ross. He was called to the Ontario bar in 1869. MacDougall served as reeve for the township from 1857 to 1858 and from 1860 to 1861. He ran unsuccessfully for the Elgin West seat in the House of Commons in 1867. He was elected to the House of Commons of Canada in an 1874 by-election, after the death of William Harvey on June 14, 1874. He lost in the 1878 election to Thomas Arkell.
