= Edinboro Castle =

Large pub in Camden Town, London

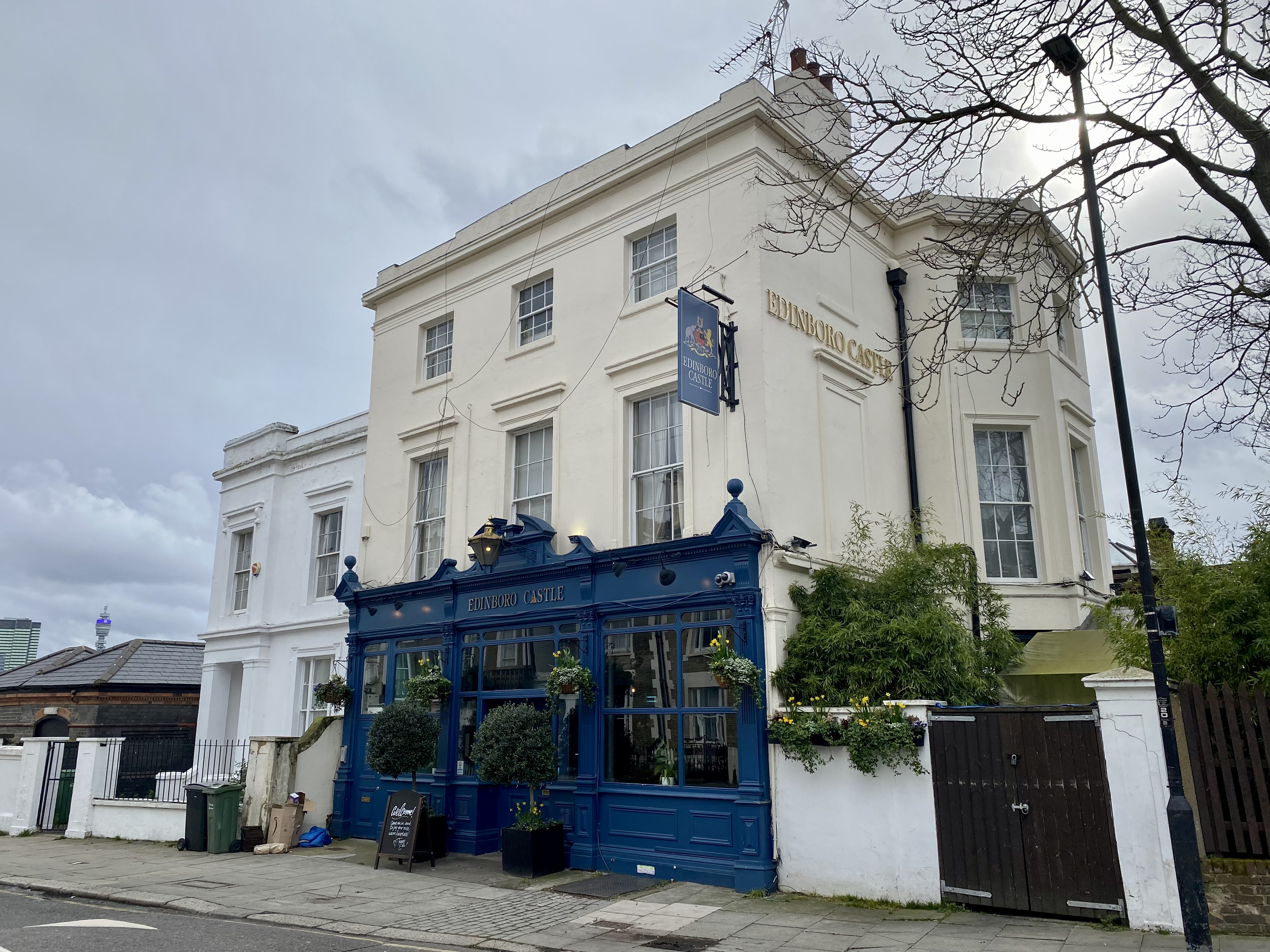
- The Edinboro Castle in 2023

- Location within London Borough of Camden
- Former names: Edinburgh Castle

General information
- Type: Public house
- Architectural style: Early Victorian
- Location: 57 Mornington Terrace; London, NW1 7RU; England
- Coordinates: 51°32′09.82″N 0°8′42.07″W
- Completed: 1839
- Renovated: 1984
- Owner: Mitchells and Butlers

Technical details
- Floor count: 3

Website
- https://www.edinborocastlepub.co.uk

Listed Building – Grade II
- Designated: 14 May 1974
- Reference no.: 1113147

The Edinboro Castle is a Grade II listed public house on Mornington Terrace in the London Borough of Camden. It was constructed in 1839 and was named after Edinburgh Castle in Scotland, with the original spelling of the pub being the same. It once housed a small museum, art gallery and tea gardens. It was listed in 1973. In 1984, a fire damaged the pub but it was refurbished in its original Victorian style by Charringtons.

== Trivia ==
An apocryphal story claims that the pub was built to serve Scottish workmen building the nearby railway, being part of a group of pubs each newly constructed for the purpose of segregating the different nationalities and reducing the risk of fights breaking out between them. While the nearby Dublin Castle is old enough to have been frequented by Irish navvies, before the opening of the railway line into Euston in 1837, the Edinburgh Castle (as it was called in the 19th and 20th centuries) was not opened until two years after the railway was complete, and the navvies were long gone, while the Windsor Castle, Pembroke Castle and Caernarvon Castle opened even later.

The suggestion that it was "originally a coaching inn" can be refuted for the same reason – since the railway was sending coach services into sharp decline, and also because it is far from any coach route and had no stable accommodation. It seems to have functioned as an inn, having "five bedchambers and a private sitting room" in 1851, apart from the very substantial bars, kitchen and "very excellent pleasure grounds and garden" – clearly aimed at a high-class clientele, not at navvies.

== Bibliography ==
- Woodford, Peter (ed.) From Primrose Hill to Euston Road. Camden History Society, 1995.
