= Elgin West (provincial electoral district) =

Ontario electoral district

Defunct provincial electoral district
- Legislature: Legislative Assembly of Ontario
- District created: 1867
- District abolished: 1933
- First contested: 1867
- Last contested: 1929

Elgin West was an electoral riding in Ontario, Canada. It was created in 1867 at the time of confederation and was abolished in 1933 before the 1934 election. After the 1875 election, Malcolm Munroe was declared the winner by 10 votes. The runner-up and incumbent Thomas Hodgins, petitioned for a recount and after analysis, he was found to have won by 8 votes. Therefore, Hodgins regained his seat. Munroe's tenure was so short that he never served in the legislature.

== Members of Provincial Parliament ==
Elgin West
Assembly	Years	Member	Party
1st	1867–1871	Nicol McColl	Conservative
2nd	1871–1874	Thomas Hodgins	Liberal
3rd	1875–1875	Malcolm Munroe (Note: Munroe was removed following an electoral appeal shortly after the 1875 election and never served in the legislature. Thomas Hodgins who was runner-up in the election was given the seat.)	Conservative
3rd	1875–1878	Thomas Hodgins	Liberal
3rd	1878–1879	David McLaws	Liberal
4th	1879–1883	John Cascaden	Liberal
5th	1883–1886	John Cascaden	Liberal
6th	1886–1890	Andrew B. Ingram	Conservative
7th	1890–1894	Dugald McColl	Conservative
8th	1894–1898	Donald Macnish	Patrons of Industry
9th	1898–1899	Findlay George MacDiarmid	Conservative
9th	1899–1899	Donald Macnish	Liberal
9th	1899–1902	Findlay George MacDiarmid	Conservative
10th	1902–1904	Findlay George MacDiarmid	Conservative
11th	1905–1908	Findlay George MacDiarmid	Conservative
12th	1908–1911	Findlay George MacDiarmid	Conservative
13th	1911–1914	Findlay George MacDiarmid	Conservative
14th	1914–1919	Findlay George MacDiarmid	Conservative
15th	1919–1923	Peter Gow Cameron	United Farmers
16th	1923–1926	Findlay George MacDiarmid	Conservative
17th	1926–1929	Findlay George MacDiarmid	Conservative
18th	1929–1934	Charles Edmund Raven	Conservative
Sourced from the Ontario Legislative Assembly
Merged into Elgin before 1934 election

== Election results ==
1929 Ontario general election
Party	Candidate	Votes	%	±%
Conservative	Charles Edmund Raven	6,579	56.17	+3.65
Liberal	John Duncan Galbraith	5,134	43.83	–3.65
Total valid votes		11,713	99.46	
Total rejected ballots		64	0.54	+0.07
Turnout		11,777	63.29	–2.51
Eligible voters		18,609		
Conservative hold		Swing		+3.65
Source: Elections Ontario

1926 Ontario general election
Party	Candidate	Votes	%	±%
Conservative	Findlay George MacDiarmid	6,818	52.52	+7.09
Liberal	John Black Ferguson	6,163	47.48	+16.73
Total valid votes		12,981	99.52	
Total rejected ballots		62	0.48	–1.05
Turnout		13,043	65.80	+7.06
Eligible voters		19,822		
Conservative hold		Swing		–4.82
Source: Elections Ontario

1923 Ontario general election
Party	Candidate	Votes	%	±%
Conservative	Findlay George MacDiarmid	5,289	45.43	+2.55
Liberal	Edward Austin Horton	3,580	30.75	–
United Farmers	Peter Gow Cameron	2,773	23.82	–33.30
Total valid votes		11,642	98.48	
Total rejected ballots		180	1.52	+1.19
Turnout		11,822	58.74	–14.28
Eligible voters		20,127		
Conservative gain from United Farmers		Swing		+1.27
Source: Elections Ontario

1919 Ontario general election
Party	Candidate	Votes	%	±%
United Farmers	Peter Gow Cameron	7,542	57.11	–
Conservative	Findlay George MacDiarmid	5,663	42.89	–
Total valid votes		13,205	99.67	
Total rejected ballots		44	0.33	–
Turnout		13,249	73.01	–
Eligible voters		18,146		
United Farmers gain from Conservative		Swing		–
Source: Elections Ontario

Ontario provincial by-election, October 21, 1914 Ministerial by-election
Party	Candidate	Votes
Conservative	Findlay George MacDiarmid	acclaimed
Source: Elections Ontario

1914 Ontario general election
Party	Candidate	Votes	%	±%
Conservative	Findlay George MacDiarmid	3,386	55.92	–6.49
Liberal	Charles C. Lumley	2,669	44.08	+6.49
Total valid votes		6,055	99.44	
Total rejected ballots		34	0.56	+0.25
Turnout		6,089	74.52	+14.83
Eligible voters		8,171		
Conservative hold		Swing		–6.49
Source: Elections Ontario

1911 Ontario general election
Party	Candidate	Votes	%	±%
Conservative	Findlay George MacDiarmid	3,188	62.41	+7.41
Liberal	Henry Stafford McDiarmid	1,920	37.59	–7.41
Total valid votes		5,108	99.69	
Total rejected ballots		16	0.31	–0.18
Turnout		5,124	59.69	–17.19
Eligible voters		8,585		
Conservative hold		Swing		+7.41
Source: Elections Ontario

1908 Ontario general election
Party	Candidate	Votes	%	±%
Conservative	Findlay George MacDiarmid	3,347	55.00	+1.99
Liberal	Frederick William Sutherland	2,738	45.00	+1.06
Total valid votes		6,085	99.51	
Total rejected ballots		30	0.49	+0.00
Turnout		6,115	76.88	–2.14
Eligible voters		7,954		
Conservative hold		Swing		+0.46
Source: Elections Ontario

1905 Ontario general election
Party	Candidate	Votes	%	±%
Conservative	Findlay George MacDiarmid	3,129	53.02	+2.39
Liberal	P. Stalker	2,593	43.93	+1.70
Socialist	John Burton	180	3.05	–4.09
Total valid votes		5,902	99.51	
Total rejected ballots		29	0.49	–0.08
Turnout		5,931	79.02	+1.83
Eligible voters		7,506		
Conservative hold		Swing		+0.34
Source: Elections Ontario

1902 Ontario general election
Party	Candidate	Votes	%	±%
Conservative	Findlay George MacDiarmid	3,027	50.63	+0.49
Liberal	A. McCrimmon	2,525	42.23	–7.64
Socialist	N. G. Wilshire	427	7.14	–
Total valid votes		5,979	99.43	
Total rejected ballots		34	0.57	+0.57
Turnout		6,013	77.19	–
Eligible voters		7,790		
Conservative hold		Swing		+4.07
Source: Elections Ontario

Ontario provincial by-election, December 12, 1899 Void Election
Party	Candidate	Votes	%	±%
Conservative	Findlay George MacDiarmid	3,204	50.13	+1.99
Liberal	Donald Macnish	3,187	49.87	–1.99
Total valid votes		6,391	100.00	
Total rejected ballots		–		
Turnout		6,391	–	–
Eligible voters				
Conservative gain from Liberal		Swing		+1.99
Source: Elections Ontario

Ontario provincial by-election, January 12, 1899 Void Election
Party	Candidate	Votes	%	±%
Liberal	Donald Macnish	3,088	51.86	+1.86
Conservative	Findlay George MacDiarmid	2,867	48.14	–1.86
Total valid votes		5,955	100.00	
Total rejected ballots		–		
Turnout		5,955	–	–
Eligible voters				
Liberal gain from Conservative		Swing		+1.86
Source: Elections Ontario

1898 Ontario general election
Party	Candidate	Votes	%	±%
Conservative	Findlay George MacDiarmid	3,101	50.01	+1.55
Liberal	Donald Macnish	3,100	49.99	–1.55
Total valid votes		6,201	99.31	
Total rejected ballots		43	0.69	–0.74
Turnout		6,244	78.62	–2.20
Eligible voters		7,942		
Conservative gain from Liberal-Patrons of Industry		Swing		+1.55
Source: Elections Ontario

1894 Ontario general election
Party	Candidate	Votes	%	±%
Liberal-Patrons of Industry	Donald Macnish	2,851	51.55	–
Conservative	Dugald McColl	2,680	48.45	–3.56
Total valid votes		5,531	98.57	
Total rejected ballots		80	1.43	+0.93
Turnout		5,611	80.82	+13.12
Eligible voters		6,943		
Liberal-Patrons of Industry gain from Conservative		Swing		–
Source: Elections Ontario

1890 Ontario general election
Party	Candidate	Votes	%	±%
Conservative	Dugald McColl	2,384	52.02	+1.55
Liberal	A. McCrimmon	2,199	47.98	–1.55
Total valid votes		4,583	99.50	
Total rejected ballots		23	0.50	–0.19
Turnout		4,606	67.70	–1.79
Eligible voters		6,804		
Conservative hold		Swing		+1.55
Source: Elections Ontario

1886 Ontario general election
Party	Candidate	Votes	%	±%
Conservative	Andrew B. Ingram	2,315	50.47	+1.73
Liberal	J. H. Coyne	2,272	49.53	–1.73
Total valid votes		4,587	99.31	
Total rejected ballots		32	0.69	+0.04
Turnout		4,619	69.49	–2.77
Eligible voters		6,647		
Conservative gain from Liberal		Swing		+1.73
Source: Elections Ontario

1883 Ontario general election
Party	Candidate	Votes	%	±%
Liberal	John Cascaden	1,324	51.26	+1.04
Conservative	Mr. Kirkpatrick	1,259	48.74	–1.04
Total valid votes		2,583	99.35	
Total rejected ballots		17	0.65	+0.65
Turnout		2,600	72.26	+1.99
Eligible voters		3,598		
Liberal hold		Swing		+1.04
Source: Elections Ontario

1879 Ontario general election
Party	Candidate	Votes	%
Liberal	John Cascaden	1,257	50.22
Conservative	Thomas Wilson Crothers	1,246	49.78
Total valid votes		2,503	70.27
Eligible voters		3,562	
Liberal hold			
Source: Elections Ontario

Ontario provincial by-election, September 1878 Resignation of Thomas Hodgins
Party	Candidate	Votes	Elected
Liberal	David McLaws	Unknown	✓
Conservative	Mr. Conn.	Unknown	
Liberal gain from Conservative			
Source: History of the Electoral Districts, Legislatures and Ministries of the Province of Ontario

1875 Ontario general election
Party	Candidate	Votes	%	±%
Conservative	Malcolm Munroe	1,101	50.23	+5.92
Liberal	Thomas Hodgins	1,091	49.77	−5.92
Turnout		2,192	78.01	+1.46
Eligible voters		2,810		
Conservative gain from Liberal		Swing		+5.92
Source: Elections Ontario

1871 Ontario general election
Party	Candidate	Votes	%	±%
Liberal	Thomas Hodgins	969	55.69	+7.96
Conservative	Mr. Price	771	44.31	−7.96
Turnout		1,740	76.55	−8.61
Eligible voters		2,273		
Liberal gain from Conservative		Swing		+7.96
Source: Elections Ontario

1867 Ontario general election
Party	Candidate	Votes	%
Conservative	Nicol McColl	909	52.27
Liberal	S. McCall	830	47.73
Total valid votes		1,739	85.16
Eligible voters		2,042	
Conservative pickup new district.			
Source: Elections Ontario
