= John Lawrence Stansell =

Canadian politician

Member of Parliament for Elgin East
- In office December 1921 – October 1925
- Preceded by: Sydney Smith McDermand
- Succeeded by: riding dissolved

Member of Parliament for Norfolk—Elgin
- In office October 1925 – September 1926
- Preceded by: riding created
- Succeeded by: William Horace Taylor

Personal details
- Born: John Lawrence Stansell; 17 June 1875 Haughton, Ontario
- Died: 21 October 1956 (aged 81)
- Party: Conservative
- Spouse(s): Alma E. Clark m. 26 June 1901
- Profession: Breeder, farmer

John Lawrence Stansell (17 June 1875 – 21 October 1956) was a Conservative member of the House of Commons of Canada. He was born in Haughton, Ontario and became a purebred livestock breeder and farmer.

He attended schools at Tuscarora and Aylmer. He became president of the Houghton, Bayham and Tillsonburg Telephone Company and in 1923 was president of the Canadian Ayrshire Breeders Association.

Stansell campaigned under the National Liberal and Conservative Party in a 22 November 1920 by-election at Elgin East but was unsuccessful. He won the riding in the 1921 federal election, then after riding boundary changes, Stansell won re-election at Norfolk—Elgin in 1925. He was defeated in the 1926 federal election by William Horace Taylor. He made another unsuccessful campaign at Norfolk—Elgin in 1930. After more riding changes in the 1930s, Stansell ran in the Elgin riding in the 1935 election as a Reconstruction Party candidate but was again unsuccessful in winning a Parliamentary seat.
