= John Cascaden =

Canadian politician

Dr. John Harold Cascaden, Sr.

Ontario MPP
- In office 1879–1886
- Preceded by: David McLaws
- Succeeded by: Andrew B. Ingram
- Constituency: Elgin West

Personal details
- Born: December 3, 1840 Ballintra, County Donegal, Ireland
- Died: August 31, 1904 (aged 63) Dutton, Ontario
- Party: Liberal
- Spouse: Hannah Katherine Decou (m. 1872)
- Children: 5

Dr. John Harold Cascaden (December 3, 1840 – August 31, 1904) was an Ontario physician and political figure. He represented Elgin West in the Legislative Assembly of Ontario from 1879 to 1886 as a Liberal member.

He was born in Ballintra, County Donegal, Ireland on December 3, 1840, and emigrated to Bruce County, Canada West with his family in 1850. He studied at the University of Toronto, receiving an M.D. in 1863, and at the Royal College of Physicians in London, England. After his first wife, Catherine Cascaden nee Ferguson, died in 1871, John Cascaden married Hannah Katherine Decou in 1872. John and Hannah had five children: David Arthur (b: 1874), Annie May (b:1875), John Harold (b:1879), Douglas Jerald (b:1881), and Gordon L. (b:1884). He served as coroner for Elgin County. John died August 31, 1904, and is buried in the cemetery of St. Stephen's Anglican Church in Dunwich, Elgin County, Ontario.

== Electoral history ==
1879 Ontario general election: Elgin West
Party	Candidate	Votes	%
Liberal	John Cascaden	1,257	50.22
Conservative	Thomas Wilson Crothers	1,246	49.78
Total valid votes		2,503	70.27
Eligible voters		3,562	
Liberal hold			
Source: Elections Ontario
