= Charles Edmund Raven =

Canadian politician

Ontario MPP
- In office 1929–1934
- Preceded by: Findlay George MacDiarmid
- Succeeded by: Riding abolished
- Constituency: Elgin West

Personal details
- Born: 1876 St. Thomas, Ontario
- Died: 1940 (aged 63–64)
- Party: Conservative
- Spouse: Alberta E. Forbes
- Occupation: Merchant

Charles Edmund Raven (1876–1940) was an Ontario merchant and political figure. He represented Elgin West in the Legislative Assembly of Ontario from 1929 to 1934 as a Conservative member.

He was born in St. Thomas, Ontario in 1876, the son of Frederick Raven, and educated there. Raven married Alberta E. Forbes. He sold shoes and leather. He served 10 years on the town council for St. Thomas and was mayor from 1923 to 1924. He was a member of the board of governors for the Memorial Hospital and served on the board of the Hydro-Electric Commission. He was the chairman of the finance committee for the local YMCA.
