= David McLaws =

Canadian politician

Member of the Ontario Provincial Parliament for Elgin West
- In office October 29, 1878 – April 25, 1879
- Preceded by: Thomas Hodgins
- Succeeded by: John Cascaden

Personal details
- Party: Liberal

David McLaws was a Canadian politician from Ontario. He represented Elgin West in the Legislative Assembly of Ontario from a 1878 by-election to 1879.

== See also ==
- 5th Parliament of Ontario
