= Andrew B. Ingram =

Canadian politician

Andrew Ingram
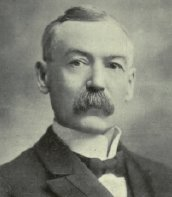

Member of Parliament for Elgin East
- In office 1891–1906
- Preceded by: John Henry Wilson
- Succeeded by: David Marshall

Ontario MPP
- In office 1886–1890
- Preceded by: John Cascaden
- Succeeded by: Dugald McColl
- Constituency: Elgin West

Personal details
- Born: April 23, 1851 Strabane, Canada West
- Died: September 6, 1934 (aged 83)
- Party: Liberal-Conservative; Conservative
- Occupation: Real estate agent

Andrew B. Ingram (April 23, 1851 – September 6, 1934) was a real estate agent and political figure in Ontario, Canada. He represented Elgin West in the Legislative Assembly of Ontario from 1886 to 1890 and Elgin East in the House of Commons of Canada from 1891 to 1906 as a Liberal-Conservative member.

He was born in Strabane, Wentworth County, Canada West in 1851, the son of Thomas Ingram. In 1882, he married Elizabeth McIntyre. He was originally a railroad employee. Ingram served as president of the St. Thomas Trades and Labour Council. His election in 1891 was appealed but he won the by-election that followed in 1892.
