= Charles Dance (playwright) =

English playwright (1794–1863)

Charles Dance (1794–1863) was an English playwright active in the early 19th century.

== Biography ==
Dance was the son of George Dance, architect. During thirty years he was in the office of the late insolvent debtors' court, in which he was successively registrar, taxing officer, and chief clerk, retiring ultimately upon a superannuation allowance.

Alone or in collaboration with James Planché or others he wrote many pieces, chiefly of the lightest description, which were produced at the Olympic or other theatres. So great was his success in supplying Madame Vestris with extravaganzas that he was spoken of as a founder of a new order of burlesque.

His pieces, which are mostly printed in Lacy's ‘Acting Edition of Plays,’ John Duncombe's ‘British Theatre,’ Webster's ‘Acting National Drama,’ and John Miller's ‘Modern Acting Drama,’ cover a period of nearly a quarter of a century. Some of his comediettas or farces, as The Bengal Tiger, Delicate Ground, A Morning Call, Who speaks first, and Naval Engagements, continued to be occasionally revived up to the end of the 19th century, and one of his pieces was translated into German.

Among his extravaganzas the best known is Olympic Revels, with which, 3 January 1831, Madame Vestris—the first feminine lessee of a theatre, according to the prologue, by John Hamilton Reynolds, spoken on the occasion—opened the Olympic. Other pieces in which Dance had more or less share are, Alive and Merry, a farce; Lucky Stars, a burletta; Advice Gratis, a farce; A Wonderful Woman, comic drama; Blue Beard, a musical burletta; A Dream of the Future, a comedy; The Victor vanquished, a comedy; Marriage a Lottery, a comedy; The Stock Exchange, a comic drama; The Paphian Bower, an extravaganza; Telemachus, an extravaganza; Pleasant Dreams, a farce; The Country Squire, a comedy; Toquet with the Tuft, a burletta; Puss in Boots, a burletta; Sons and Systems, a burletta; The Burlington Arcade,’ a burletta; Izaak Walton, a drama; The Beulah Spa, a burletta; The Dustman's Belle, a comic drama; A Match in the Dark, a comedietta; and The Water Party, a farce.

During his later years Dance was a well-known figure at the Garrick Club. Dance was twice married, and survived both his wives. He lived in Mornington Road, not far from Regent's Park, and died at Lowestoft, whither he had returned for his health, 5 January 1863. His illness was heart disease.
