= Nicol McColl =

Canadian politician

Ontario MPP
- In office 1867–1871
- Preceded by: Riding established
- Succeeded by: Thomas Hodgins
- Constituency: Elgin West

Personal details
- Born: 1812 Glen Orchy, Argyleshire, Scotland
- Died: April 17, 1878 (aged 65) Southwold, Ontario
- Party: Conservative
- Spouse: Mary McIntyre (m. 1858)
- Relations: Dugald McColl, son
- Occupation: Farmer

Nicol McColl (1812 – April 17, 1878) was an Ontario farmer and political figure. He represented Elgin West in the Legislative Assembly of Ontario as a Conservative member from 1867 to 1871.

He was born in Glen Orchy, Argyleshire, Scotland in 1812 and grew up there. McColl came to Upper Canada in 1831. He married Jeannet Campbell in 1845; in 1858, he married Mary McIntyre after his first wife's death. He served on the councils for Middlesex and Elgin counties. His son Dugald also later represented Elgin West in the legislative assembly. He died in Southwold in 1878, aged 66.

== Electoral history ==
1867 Ontario general election: Elgin West
Party	Candidate	Votes	%
Conservative	Nicol McColl	909	52.27
Liberal	S. McCall	830	47.73
Total valid votes		1,739	85.16
Eligible voters		2,042	
Conservative pickup new district.			
Source: Elections Ontario
