= Thomas William Dobbie =

Canadian politician

Thomas William Dobbie (November 13, 1829 – April 1, 1908) was a Canadian civil engineer, provincial land surveyor and political figure. He represented Elgin East in the 1st Canadian Parliament as a Conservative member.

He was born in Bayham Township, Upper Canada in 1829, the son of Andrew Dobbie, a Scottish immigrant, and Martha Ann Bowlby. Dobbie was educated in Bayham township and London, Ontario. He served as reeve for the township from 1863 to 1867 and from 1876 to 1877. Dobbie lived in Tillsonburg.

Dobbie was married twice: to Susan Margaret Jones in 1872 and to Mary Hodgson in 1891. He died in Tillsonburg at the age of 78.
