= Michael McKnight =

Canadian politician from Ontario

Member of the Ontario Provincial Parliament for Elgin East
- In office June 25, 1923 – October 18, 1926
- Preceded by: Malcolm MacVicar
- Succeeded by: Edward Blake Miller

Personal details
- Party: Conservative

Michael McKnight was a Canadian politician from the Conservative Party of Ontario. He represented Elgin East in the Legislative Assembly of Ontario from 1923 to 1926.

== See also ==
- 16th Parliament of Ontario
