= Thomas Hodgins =

Canadian politician

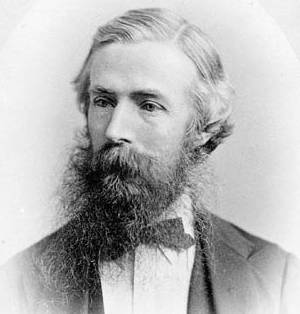

Ontario MPP
- In office 1875–1878
- Preceded by: Malcolm Munroe
- Succeeded by: David McLaws
- In office 1871–1874
- Preceded by: Nicol McColl
- Succeeded by: Malcolm Munroe
- Constituency: Elgin West

Personal details
- Born: October 6, 1828 Dublin, Ireland
- Died: July 1, 1910 (aged 81) Toronto, Ontario
- Party: Liberal
- Occupation: Lawyer

Thomas Hodgins, KC (October 6, 1828 – 1910) was an Ontario, Canada lawyer and political figure. He represented Elgin West in the Legislative Assembly of Ontario as a Liberal member from 1871 to 1878.

Born in Dublin, Ireland in 1828, he went to Toronto, Province of Canada in 1848. He studied at the University of Toronto and was called to the bar in 1858. In the same year, he married Maria, the daughter of John Scoble. He was named Queen's Counsel in 1873. In 1878, he took part in the discussions with the federal government which established the northern and western boundaries of the province of Ontario. In the same year, he resigned his seat in the Ontario legislature to run, unsuccessfully, in the federal riding of West Toronto. He contributed to the Upper Canada Law Journal and also published a number of works on the subject of law.

His brother, John George Hodgins served as deputy minister in the Ontario Ministry of Education.

== Electoral history ==
1871 Ontario general election: Elgin West
Party	Candidate	Votes	%	±%
Liberal	Thomas Hodgins	969	55.69	+7.96
Conservative	Mr. Price	771	44.31	−7.96
Turnout		1,740	76.55	−8.61
Eligible voters		2,273		
Liberal gain from Conservative		Swing		+7.96
Source: Elections Ontario

1875 Ontario general election: Elgin West
Party	Candidate	Votes	%	±%
Conservative	Malcolm Munroe	1,101	50.23	+5.92
Liberal	Thomas Hodgins	1,091	49.77	−5.92
Turnout		2,192	78.01	+1.46
Eligible voters		2,810		
Conservative gain from Liberal		Swing		+5.92
Source: Elections Ontario
