= Peter Gow Cameron =

Canadian politician from Ontario

Member of the Ontario Provincial Parliament for Elgin West
- In office October 20, 1919 – May 10, 1923
- Preceded by: Findlay George MacDiarmid
- Succeeded by: Findlay George MacDiarmid

Personal details
- Party: United Farmers

Peter Gow Cameron was a Canadian politician from Ontario. He represented Elgin West in the Legislative Assembly of Ontario from 1919 to 1923.

== See also ==
- 15th Parliament of Ontario
