= Donald Macnish =

Canadian politician

Ontario MPP
- In office 1899–1899
- Preceded by: Findlay George MacDiarmid
- Succeeded by: Findlay George MacDiarmid
- In office 1894–1898
- Preceded by: Dugald McColl
- Succeeded by: Findlay George MacDiarmid
- Constituency: Elgin West

Personal details
- Born: June 10, 1841 Argyleshire, Scotland
- Died: March 25, 1927 (aged 85)
- Party: Liberal-Patron, 1894-1898; Liberal, 1899
- Occupation: Farmer

Donald Macnish (June 10, 1841 – March 25, 1927) was an Ontario farmer and political figure. He represented Elgin West in the Legislative Assembly of Ontario from 1894 to 1899 as a Liberal-Patrons of Industry and then a Liberal member.

He was born in Argyleshire, Scotland and came to Canada West with his parents in 1852. He was educated in St. Thomas and lived near Fingal. He served as a school trustee. Macnish was an unsuccessful candidate for the federal seat in 1911.
