= William Harvey (Canadian politician) =

Canadian politician

William Harvey (April 3, 1821 – June 14, 1874) was a Canadian political figure. He represented Elgin East in the House of Commons of Canada from 1872 to 1874 as a Liberal member.

He was born in Malahide Township, Elgin County, Upper Canada and was educated there. In 1848, he married a Miss Sophronia Mack. Harvey served on the town council for Malahide and the council for Malahide Township. He died in office after contracting smallpox during a visit to Ottawa in 1874 in Aylmer, Ontario.
