= John Henry Wilson (Canadian politician) =

Canadian politician (1834–1912)

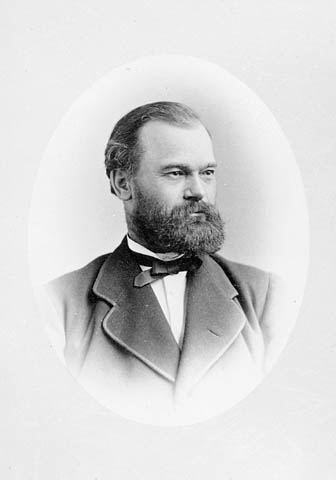
John Henry Wilson

John Henry Wilson (14 February 1834 – 3 July 1912) was a Canadian physician, professor, and parliamentarian. A Liberal, he served two terms as a Member of Parliament representing the electoral district of Elgin East in the province of Ontario. He also represented Elgin East in the Legislative Assembly of Ontario from 1871 to 1879.

He was born near Bytown, Upper Canada in 1834, the grandson of a United Empire Loyalist. He studied medicine at the Toronto School of Medicine (later the Faculty of Medicine at the University of Toronto) and New York University. He received his M.D. in 1859 and was appointed professor of anatomy at Victoria College. In 1860, he opened a medical practice in St. Thomas, Ontario. He was elected to the provincial legislature in 1871 and 1875. He was elected to the federal parliament in the Canadian federal election of 1882 and was re-elected in 1887. On 8 March 1904 he was appointed to the Senate of Canada upon the recommendation of Sir Wilfrid Laurier. He represented the senatorial division of St. Thomas, Ontario until his death in 1912.

== Electoral history ==
1871 Ontario general election: Elgin East
Party	Candidate	Votes	%	±%
Liberal	John Henry Wilson	1,442	53.11	+3.55
Conservative	Daniel Luton	1,273	46.89	−3.55
Turnout		2,715	63.82	−11.65
Eligible voters		4,254		
Liberal gain from Conservative		Swing		+3.55
Source: Elections Ontario

Parliament of Canada
Preceded by Thomas Arkell	Member of Parliament for Elgin East; 1882–1891	Succeeded by Andrew B. Ingram
