= William Horace Taylor =

Canadian politician

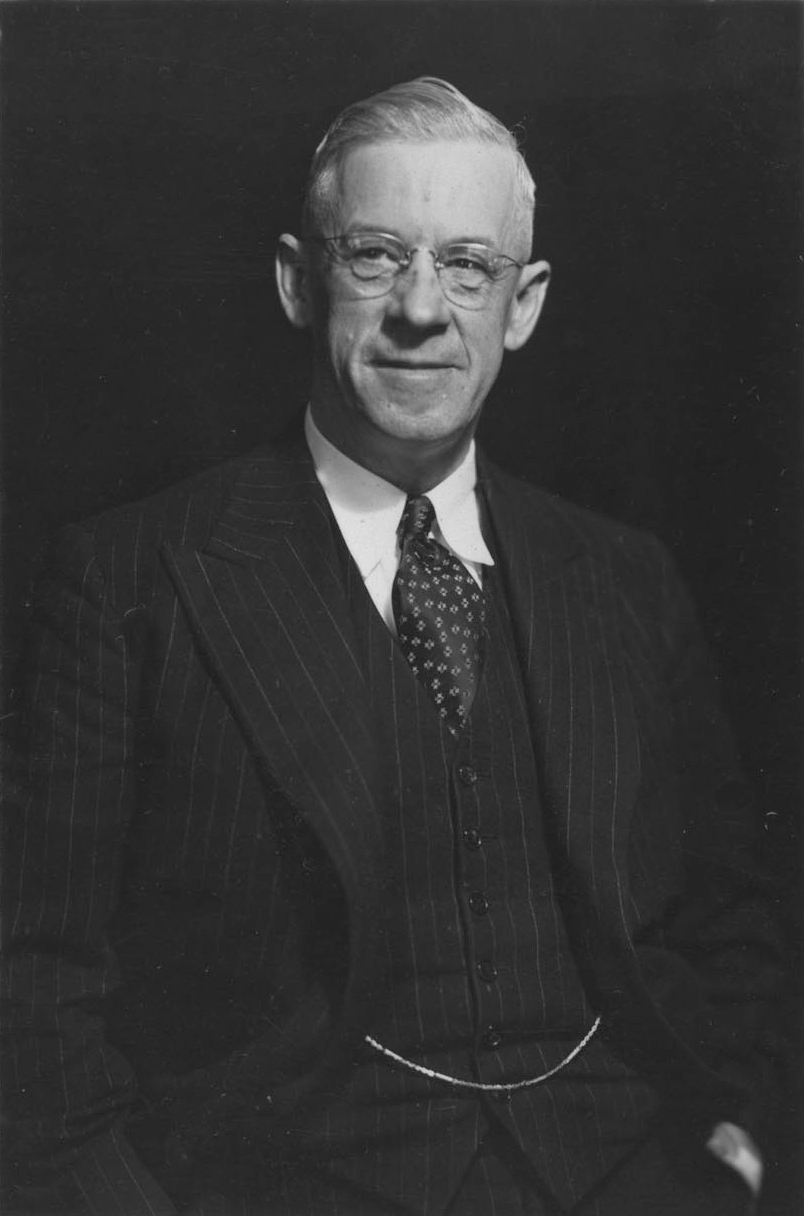

Member of Parliament for Norfolk—Elgin
- In office 1926–1945
- Preceded by: John Lawrence Stansell

Canadian Senator from Ontario
- In office 1945–1966

Personal details
- Born: 7 December 1889 Townsend Township, Ontario, Canada
- Died: 20 June 1986 (aged 96)
- Party: Liberal; Independent Liberal
- Profession: Farmer

William Horace Taylor (7 December 1889 – 20 June 1986) was a Canadian politician.

== Background ==
Born in Townsend Township, Ontario, he grew up on a farm near Scotland, Ontario, south of Brantford, Ontario. From 1921 to 1925, he was a farmer in Scotland. He was elected a councillor and later the reeve of Windham Township.

In 1926, he was elected to the House of Commons of Canada in the riding of Norfolk—Elgin. A Liberal, he was re-elected in 1930, 1935, and 1940. From 1940 to 1945, he was the Chief Government Whip.

In 1945, he was summoned to the Senate of Canada representing the senatorial division of Norfolk, Ontario. He retired in 1966.
