= Findlay George MacDiarmid =

Canadian politician

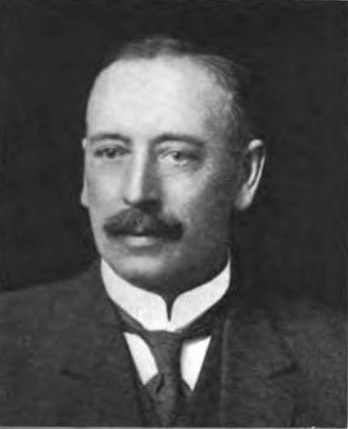

Ontario MPP
- In office 1923–1929
- Preceded by: Peter Gow Cameron
- Succeeded by: Charles Edmund Raven
- In office 1899–1919
- Preceded by: Donald Macnish
- Succeeded by: Peter Gow Cameron
- In office 1898–1899
- Preceded by: Donald Macnish
- Succeeded by: Donald Macnish
- Constituency: Elgin West

Personal details
- Born: October 11, 1869 New Glasgow, Aldborough Township, Elgin County, Ontario
- Died: July 15, 1933 (aged 63) Toronto, Ontario
- Party: Conservative
- Spouse: Minnie McGugan (m. 1895)
- Occupation: Farmer

Findlay (Finlay) George MacDiarmid (October 11, 1869 – July 15, 1933) was an Ontario farmer and political figure. He represented Elgin West in the Legislative Assembly of Ontario as a Conservative member in 1898 and from 1900 to 1919 and from 1923 to 1929.

He was born in New Glasgow, Aldborough Township, Elgin County, Ontario, the son of Finlay MacDiarmid. He served on the township council for Aldborough Township. In 1895, he married Minnie McGugan. In the 1898 election, he was declared defeated but then was declared elected on appeal. That election was then voided and he lost the by-election that followed in 1899 to Donald Macnish. After another appeal, MacDiarmid won a by-election held in 1900. He served as Minister of Public Works and Highways from 1914 to 1919, Minister of Public Highways from 1916 to 1919, and Minister of Labour (although Walter Rollo is credited as first Minister of Labour after 1919 elections) from February to November 1919.

He died from a stroke at Toronto General Hospital on July 15, 1933.

Enter ministry number
Cabinet post (1)
Predecessor	Office	Successor
New position	Minister of Public Works and Highways; 1916-1919	Frank Campbell Biggs
