= Dugald McColl =

Canadian politician

Ontario MPP
- In office 1890–1894
- Preceded by: Andrew B. Ingram
- Succeeded by: Donald Macnish
- Constituency: Elgin West

Personal details
- Born: May 16, 1846 Southwold, Canada West
- Died: August 10, 1915 (aged 69) St. Thomas, Ontario
- Party: Conservative
- Spouse: Mary Black (m. 1875)
- Relations: Nicol McColl, father
- Occupation: Insurance executive

Dugald McColl (May 16, 1846 – August 10, 1915) was a political figure in Ontario. He represented Elgin West in the Legislative Assembly of Ontario from 1890 to 1894 as a Conservative member.

He was born in Southwold, Ontario, the son of Nicol McColl and Janette Campbell. McColl inherited the family homestead. He served as deputy reeve and then reeve for Southwold township. In 1875, McColl married Mary Black. He was vice-president of the township insurance company. He died at St. Thomas in 1915.
