= Malcolm Munroe =

Canadian politician

Ontario MPP
- In office January 1875 – July 1875
- Preceded by: Thomas Hodgins
- Succeeded by: Thomas Hodgins
- Constituency: Elgin West

Personal details
- Party: Conservative

Malcolm G. Munroe was an Ontario political figure. He represented Elgin West in the Legislative Assembly of Ontario as a Conservative member from January to July 1875.

Munroe was initially elected to the legislature in the 1875 Ontario general election. His election, however was later petitioned, on the basis that Munroe, who won the election by a mere ten votes, had votes by "people not qualified to vote", and that valid ballots for his opponent were disregarded. The petition later proved to be successful in a decision made by the Ontario Elections court on June 24, 1875, elevating the election runner-up, Thomas Hodgins to the office and voiding the election results on July 7, 1875.

== Electoral history ==
1875 Ontario general election: Elgin West
Party	Candidate	Votes	%	±%
Conservative	Malcolm Munroe	1,101	50.23	+5.92
Liberal	Thomas Hodgins	1,091	49.77	−5.92
Turnout		2,192	78.01	+1.46
Eligible voters		2,810		
Conservative gain from Liberal		Swing		+5.92
Source: Elections Ontario
