= Thomas Arkell =

Canadian politician

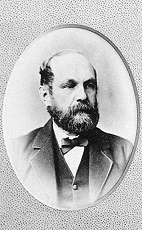

Member of Parliament for Elgin East
- In office 1878–1882
- Preceded by: Colin MacDougall
- Succeeded by: John Henry Wilson

Personal details
- Born: 10 November 1823 Gloucestershire, England
- Died: 2 February 1906 (aged 82)
- Party: Liberal-Conservative
- Profession: farmer, grain merchant

Thomas Arkell (10 November 1823 - 2 February 1906) was a Canadian politician, farmer and grain merchant. He was elected to the House of Commons of Canada in 1878 as a Member of the Liberal-Conservative Party to represent the riding of Elgin East. He was defeated in the election of 1882. Prior to his federal experience, he was elected mayor of St. Thomas, Upper Canada (later Ontario) between 1865 and 1871.

Arkell was born in Gloucestershire, England, United Kingdom and immigrated to Upper Canada. He married Olive Eldridge and they had nine children.
