= Herbert James Davis =

Canadian veterinary surgeon and politician

Herbert James Davis (September 7, 1890 – April 19, 1950) was a veterinary surgeon and political figure in Ontario. He represented Elgin East in the Legislative Assembly of Ontario from 1929 to 1934 as a Conservative member.

He was born in Shelburne, Dufferin County, the son of John Davis and A. Harris and was educated in Shelbourne and Woodstock and at the Ontario Agricultural College and the Ontario Veterinary College. In 1921, Davis married Clara A. Lindsay. He served in the Canadian Expeditionary Force during World War I, enlisting as a private and reaching the rank of lieutenant before his discharge. Davis was a director of the Lindsay and Malahide Telephone Co. Davis served as mayor of Aylmer, Ontario from 1927 to 1928 and from 1937 to 1939. He served in the Second Elgin Regiment during World War II. Davis died at his home near St. Thomas at the age of 59.
