= Charles Andrew Brower =

Canadian politician

Charles Andrew Brower (June 15, 1857 – June 1, 1924) was an Ontario farmer and political figure. He represented Elgin East in the Legislative Assembly of Ontario as a Conservative member from 1894 to 1899 and from 1900 to 1919.

He was born in Yarmouth Township, the son of William Brower, and educated at St. Thomas and London, Ontario. Brower was reeve for Yarmouth Township from 1890 to 1892. He married Ellen Penhale and then married her sister Minnie in 1899 a few years after Ellen died. He was unseated in 1899 after an appeal but was reelected in a by-election held later that year. Brower lived near New Sarum.
