= Dublin Castle, Camden =

Dublin Castle
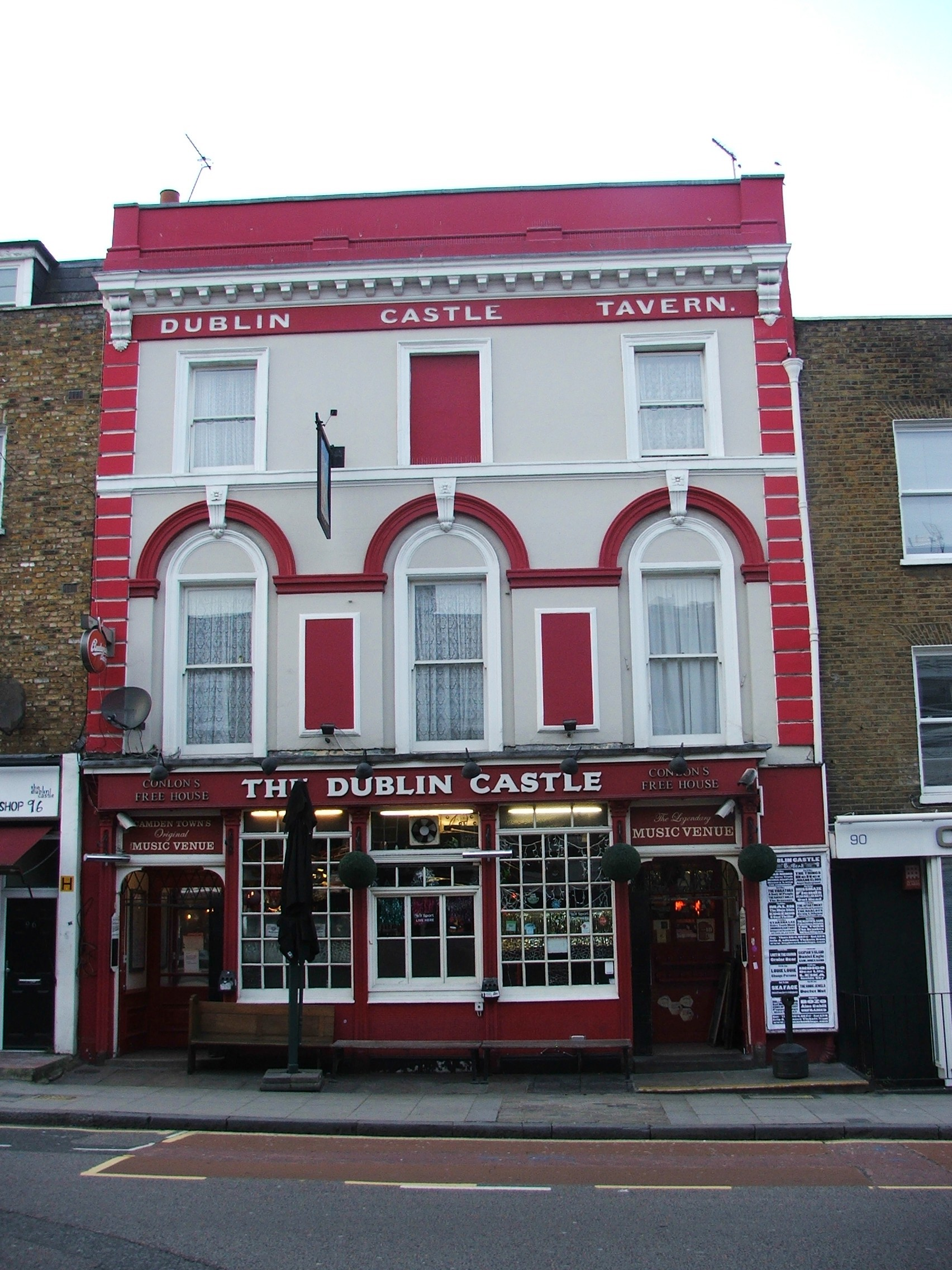
- View of the pub from Parkway

- Location within London

General information
- Type: Public house
- Location: Camden Town, London, England
- Coordinates: 51°32′14″N 0°8′44″W
- Opening: c. 1856

Website
- www.thedublincastle.com

The Dublin Castle is a pub and live music venue in Camden Town, London. It gained prominence as a venue in the late 1970s after the band Madness established a live reputation there. Subsequently, it was an important venue in the early stages of several bands' careers and contributed to the Britpop musical genre. Amy Winehouse was a regular visitor to the pub.

== History ==
An apocryphal story claims not only that the pub was built to serve Irish immigrant workmen while building the nearby railway, but also that it formed part of a group of other pubs each newly constructed for the purpose of segregating the different nationalities and reduce the risk of fights breaking out between them. While this pub featured in rates books as early as 1821 and hence may possibly have been frequented by Irish navvies, as the canal was completed in 1820 and the opening of the railway line into Euston in 1837, there were no other pubs named after castles until the Edinboro Castle on Mornington Terrace opened afterwards in 1839.

Music was originally restricted to occasional traditional Irish sessions. The emergence of other venues around Camden Town, including the Roundhouse, Dingwalls and the Electric Ballroom brought an increased interest in live music to the area, including the Dublin Castle. The pub can now accommodate an audience up to 200 people.

Madness first attempted to secure a gig at the venue in late 1978, when they were still known as the Camden Invaders. They first performed at the venue on 16 January 1979. According to singer Suggs, the group had to pretend they were a jazz band to get a booking. Landlord Alo Conlon invited the group back for a residency at the venue, and helped to establish their reputation.

Conlon chose bands to play in the pub that he thought would attract an audience, and word of mouth spread so that A&R scouts would visit the pub to see what up and coming acts were available. The pub was an important venue for Britpop acts in the 1990s, as it was often the first major London gig for bands that later found commercial success, including Blur. It also hosted Coldplay's first concert under that name, in 1998. Amy Winehouse performed regularly at the venue and occasionally helped to serve drinks to customers.

In 2008, Conlon received a lifetime achievement award for his services to the pub industry in Camden. He died in January 2009 aged 73. A tribute and street party was held on Parkway, with Suggs in attendance.

== Events ==
The Dublin Castle regularly hosts live music events from Wednesday to Sunday every week. It previously hosted a popular open jam on Tuesday nights, which included appearances from major bands such as The Libertines.

Redrock Jam was hosted by local band Redwire, who also hosted Redrock Festival at the same venue.
