= Henry Thomas Godwin =

Canadian politician

MPP for Elgin East
- In office June 05, 1890 – May 29, 1894

Personal details
- Born: August 19, 1853 Bayham, Canada West
- Died: April 11, 1918 (aged 64) Richmond, Ontario
- Party: Progressive Conservative Party of Ontario

Henry Thomas Godwin (August 19, 1853 – April 11, 1918) was an Ontario farmer and political figure. He represented Elgin East in the Legislative Assembly of Ontario as a Conservative member from 1890 to 1894.

He was born in Bayham, Canada West in 1853, a descendant of early settlers in Elgin County. In 1881, he married Ida Buchner. Godwin served on the county council and was warden in 1889. He died April 11, 1918.
