= David Marshall (Canadian politician) =

Canadian politician

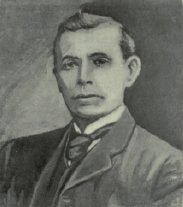

Member of the Canadian Parliament for Elgin East
- In office 1906–1920
- Preceded by: Andrew B. Ingram
- Succeeded by: Sydney Smith McDermand

Personal details
- Born: October 26, 1846 Halton County, Canada West
- Died: February 14, 1920 (aged 73)
- Party: Conservative

David Marshall (October 26, 1846 – February 14, 1920) was a Canadian politician.

Born in Halton County, Canada West, Marshall was a businessman, before being elected to the House of Commons of Canada for the Ontario electoral district of Elgin East in a 1906 by-election, after the sitting MP, Andrew B. Ingram, was appointed Vice Chairman of the Ontario Railway and Municipal Commission. A Conservative, he was re-elected in 1908, 1911, and 1917. He died in office in 1920.
