= Charles Oaks Ermatinger =

Canadian politician (1851–1921)

Charles Oaks (Oakes) Ermatinger (February 5, 1851 – December 16, 1921) was an Ontario lawyer, judge and political figure. He represented Elgin East in the Legislative Assembly of Ontario from 1883 to 1886 as a Conservative member.

He was born in St. Thomas, Canada West, in 1851, the son of Edward Ermatinger and the grandson of Zacheus Burnham. He articled in law with H.F. Ellis and D.B. Read, was called to the bar in 1873 and set up practice at St. Thomas. He served on the town council. In 1876, he married Charlotte, the widow of Arthur Dickson and daughter of Hugh Richardson. In 1885, he was named Queen's Counsel. Ermatinger ran unsuccessfully for the same seat in the House of Commons in 1887. In 1890, he was appointed Junior Judge for Elgin County.

Ermatinger published an edition of The Talbot regime : or, The first half century of the Talbot settlement, originally published by his father.

== Bibliography ==
- Ermatinger, C. O. The Retreat of Proctor and Tecumseh. S.l: s.n, 1919.
- Ermatinger, C. O. The Story of Old St. Thomas Church. St. Thomas, Ont.?: s.n, 1905. ISBN 0-665-74242-8
- Ermatinger, C. O. The Talbot Regime Or, The First Half Century of the Talbot Settlement. St. Thomas: Municipal world, 1904.
- Ermatinger, C. O. Canadian Franchise and Election Laws A Manual for the Use of Revising Officers, Municipal Officers, Candidates, Agents, and Electors : with Supplement Containing the Amending Acts of 1886. Toronto: Carswell, 1980. ISBN 0-665-02920-9
- Ermatinger, C. O., James H. Coyne, and W. H. Murch. Reminiscences of Early Settlers and Other Records Being the Fourth Publication of the Elgin Historical and Scientific Institute. St. Thomas, Ont: Elgin Historical and Scientific Institute, 1911.
