= Sydney Smith McDermand =

Canadian politician

Sydney Smith McDermand (August 17, 1868 – August 5, 1961) was a Canadian farmer and politician.

McDermand was born in Elgin County, Ontario where he lived his entire life. A farmer, he became active in local politics as a member of the township council from 1908 to 1912 and again in 1931.

McDermand was first elected to the House of Commons of Canada from Elgin East in a 1920 by-election as a United Farmers of Ontario MP but was defeated as a Progressive candidate in 1921 federal election by Conservative John Lawrence Stansell by less than 100 votes. After leaving politics, he became an insurance agent for South Dorchester Farm Mutual and went on to serve as the firm's president for 18 years.

Parliament of Canada
Preceded by David Marshall	Member of Parliament for Elgin East; 1920–1921	Succeeded by John Lawrence Stansell
