= Mornington Terrace =

Street in London, England

Coordinates: 51.5350°N 0.1433°W

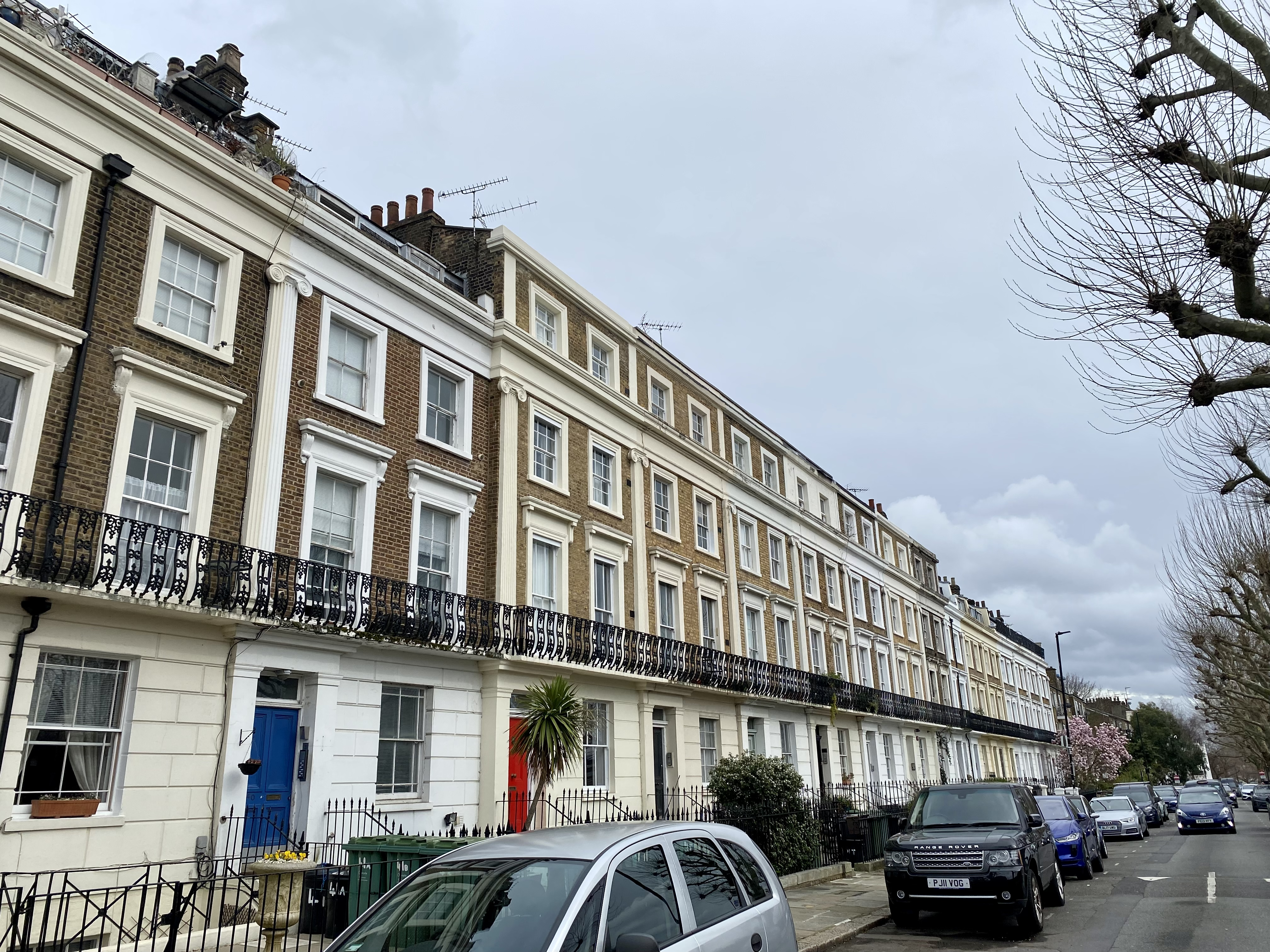
Victorian terraced housing facing towards the railway on the right.

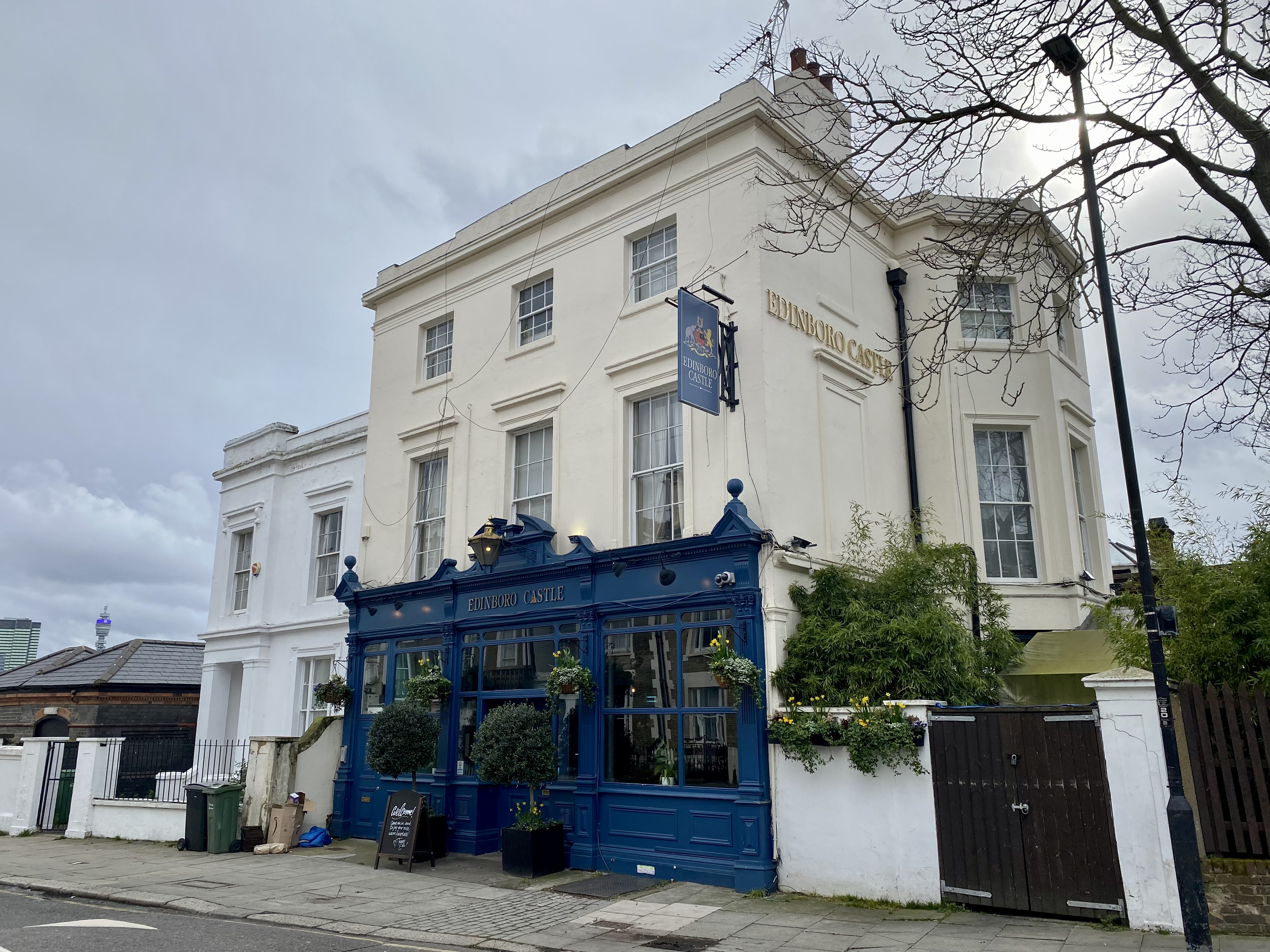
The Edinboro Castle pub.

Mornington Terrace is a street in Camden Town. Located in the London Borough of Camden, it runs southeastwards from Delancey Street following the route of the main line into Euston that runs immediately to its west. At its southern end it becomes Clarkson Row while Mornington Place connects it to Mornington Crescent. Both Mornington Terrace and Place are notable for their surviving Victorian houses.

Like the slightly earlier Mornington Crescent it takes its name from the Irish aristocrat Richard, Earl of Mornington, the elder brother of the Duke of Wellington. The area was built up to provide extra residential capacity for the expanding capital. The construction of the railway into Euston in the late 1830s defined the route of the new street. It was called Mornington Road on an 1849 map. At that time the terraced housing on the eastern side were complimented by upmarket villas on the western side. These survived until 1900 when widening of the main line lead to their demolition. Today the street only has buildings on its eastern side. Mornington Place, originally Crescent Place, features more terraced Victoria houses before meeting Mornington Crescent by the Art Deco Carreras Cigarette Factory. Another road, Mornington Street, crosses Mornington Terrace roughly halfway down and then carries on in a bridge over the railway.

The Edinboro Castle pub was constructed in the early Victorian period and is now Grade II listed. Another pub, The Victoria, sat on the corner between Mornington Terrace and Place for many years, A number of buildings are now listed. Notable residents of the streets have included H.G. Wells, who wrote several popular novels while living there with Catherine Wells, and the scientist William Crookes.

== Bibliography ==
- Bebbington, Gillian. London Street Names. Batsford, 1972.
- Cherry, Bridget & Pevsner, Nikolaus. London 3: North West. Yale University Press, 2002.
- Woodford, Peter (ed.) From Primrose Hill to Euston Road. Camden History Society, 1995.
