= Elgin East (federal electoral district) =

Former federal electoral district in Ontario, Canada

Ontario electoral district

Defunct federal electoral district
- Legislature: House of Commons
- District created: 1867
- District abolished: 1924
- First contested: 1867
- Last contested: 1921

Elgin East was a federal electoral district represented in the House of Commons of Canada from 1867 to 1925. It was located in the province of Ontario. It was created by the British North America Act 1867 which divided the county of Elgin into two ridings: Elgin East and Elgin West based on a traditional division.

In 1882, the East Riding of the county of Elgin was defined as consisting of the townships of Yarmouth, Malahide and Bayham, the villages of Port Stanley, Aylmer and Vienna, and the city of St. Thomas.

In 1903, the riding was redefined to exclude the township of Malahide and the city of St. Thomas, and to include the townships of Dorchester South and Malahide, and the village of Springfield.

The electoral district was abolished in 1924 when it was redistributed between Elgin West and Norfolk—Elgin ridings.

== Members of Parliament ==
This riding has elected the following members of Parliament:

Parliament	Years	Member	Party
1st	1867–1872	Thomas William Dobbie	Conservative
2nd	1872–1874	William Harvey	Liberal
3rd	1874–1874†	William Harvey	Liberal
3rd	1874–1878	Colin MacDougall	Liberal
4th	1878–1882	Thomas Arkell	Liberal–Conservative
5th	1882–1887	John Henry Wilson	Liberal
6th	1887–1891	John Henry Wilson	Liberal
7th	1891–1892	Andrew B. Ingram	Liberal–Conservative
7th	1892–1896	Andrew B. Ingram	Liberal–Conservative
8th	1896–1900	Andrew B. Ingram	Liberal–Conservative
9th	1900–1904	Andrew B. Ingram	Liberal–Conservative
10th	1904–1906	Andrew B. Ingram	Liberal–Conservative
10th	1906–1908	David Marshall	Conservative
11th	1908–1911	David Marshall	Conservative
12th	1911–1917	David Marshall	Conservative
13th	1917–1920	David Marshall	Government (Unionist)
13th	1920–1921	Sydney Smith McDermand	United Farmers of Ontario
14th	1921–1925	John Lawrence Stansell	Conservative
Riding dissolved into Elgin West and Norfolk—Elgin

== Election results ==
1867 Canadian federal election
Party	Candidate	Votes
Conservative	Thomas William Dobbie	1,492
Unknown	Leonidas Burwell	1,382
Eligible voters		3,733
Source: Canadian Parliamentary Guide, 1871

1872 Canadian federal election
Party	Candidate	Votes
Liberal	William Harvey	1,658
Unknown	S. Rice	1,490

1874 Canadian federal election
Party	Candidate	Votes
Liberal	William Harvey	1,886
Unknown	S. Day	1,704

On Mr. Harvey's death, 14 June 1874:

By-election on 11 August 1874
Party	Candidate	Votes
Liberal	Colin MacDougall	1,738
Conservative	Thomas Jenkins	1,523

1878 Canadian federal election
Party	Candidate	Votes
Liberal–Conservative	Thomas Arkell	2,168
Liberal	Colin MacDougall	2,128

1882 Canadian federal election
Party	Candidate	Votes
Liberal	John Henry Wilson	2,221
Liberal–Conservative	Thomas Arkell	2,097

1887 Canadian federal election
Party	Candidate	Votes
Liberal	John Henry Wilson	2,744
Conservative	Charles Oaks Ermatinger	2,690

1891 Canadian federal election
Party	Candidate	Votes
Liberal–Conservative	Andrew B. Ingram	2,740
Liberal	John Henry Wilson	2,694

On election being declared void:

By-election on 12 February 1892
Party	Candidate	Votes
Liberal–Conservative	Andrew B. Ingram	acclaimed

1896 Canadian federal election
Party	Candidate	Votes
Liberal–Conservative	A. B. Ingram	2,862
Liberal	J. H. Wilson	2,684
Patrons of Industry	J. P. Martyn	492

1900 Canadian federal election
Party	Candidate	Votes
Liberal–Conservative	Andrew B. Ingram	3,076
Liberal	John Henry Wilson	2,925

1904 Canadian federal election
Party	Candidate	Votes
Liberal–Conservative	Andrew B. Ingram	2,103
Liberal	Wm. F. Hepburn	2,082

On Mr. Ingram's resignation, 8 December 1906, because of his appointment as Vice Chairman of the Ontario Railway and Municipal Commission:

By-election on 14 October 1906
Party	Candidate	Votes
Conservative	David Marshall	2,069
Liberal	G. Haight	1,996

1908 Canadian federal election
Party	Candidate	Votes
Conservative	David Marshall	2,263
Liberal	Walter W. Rutherford	2,016

1911 Canadian federal election
Party	Candidate	Votes
Conservative	David Marshall	2,313
Liberal	Francis Hincks Miller	1,919

1917 Canadian federal election
Party	Candidate	Votes
Government (Unionist)	David Marshall	2,591
Opposition (Laurier Liberals)	William Granville Charlton	2,283

On Mr. Marshall's death, 14 February 1920:

By-election on 22 November 1920
Party	Candidate	Votes
United Farmers of Ontario	Sydney Smith McDermand	3,101
National Liberal and Conservative	John Lawrence Stansell	2,850
Liberal	William Granville Charlton	2,012

1921 Canadian federal election
Party	Candidate	Votes
Conservative	John Lawrence Stansell	3,240
Progressive	Sydney Smith McDermand	3,172
Liberal	Charles Wesley Colter	1,750

== See also ==
- List of Canadian electoral districts
- Historical federal electoral districts of Canada
