= List of municipalities in the Greater Toronto Area =

In the Greater Toronto Area, there are 25 incorporated municipalities in either York Region, Halton Region, Peel Region, Durham Region or Toronto. According to the 2021 census, the Greater Toronto Area has a total population of 6,711,985.

Municipalities in the Greater Toronto Area

== List of municipalities ==
Census subdivision	Municipal status	Total population 2011	Population density 2011^{a}	Total population 2016	Population density 2016^{a}	Total population 2021	Population density 2021^{a}
Ajax	Town (lower-tier)	109,600	1,634.2	119,677	1,786.4	126,666	1,634.2
Aurora	Town (lower-tier)	53,203	1,068.8	55,445	1,112.3	62,057	1,241.1
Brampton	City (lower-tier)	523,906	1,967.1	593,638	2,228.7	656,480	2,469.0
Brock	Township (lower-tier)	11,341	26.8	11,642	27.5	12,567	29.7
Burlington	City (lower-tier)	175,779	946.8	183,314	987.3	186,948	1,004.4
Caledon	Town (lower-tier)	59,460	86.4	66,502	96.6	76,581	111.2
Clarington	Municipality (lower-tier)	84,548	138.3	92,013	150.5	101,427	166.0
East Gwillimbury	Town (lower-tier)	22,473	91.7	23,991	97.9	34,637	141.4
Georgina	Town (lower-tier)	43,517	151.2	45,418	157.8	47,642	165.6
Halton Hills	Town (lower-tier)	59,013	213.6	61,161	221.4	62,951	227.4
King	Township (lower-tier)	19,899	59.7	24,512	73.6	27,333	82.3
Markham	City (lower-tier)	301,709	1,419.3	328,966	1,549.2	338,503	1,604.8
Milton	Town (lower-tier)	84,362	232.3	110,128	303.2	132,979	366.1
Mississauga	City (lower-tier)	713,443	2,439.9	721,599	2,467.6	717,961	2,467.6
Newmarket	Town (lower-tier)	79,978	2,086.3	84,224	2,190.5	87,942	2,284.1
Oakville	Town (lower-tier)	182,520	1,314.2	193,832	1,395.6	213,759	1,538.5
Oshawa	City (lower-tier)	149,607	1,027.0	159,458	1,094.9	175,383	1,027.0
Pickering	City (lower-tier)	88,721	383.1	91,771	396.3	99,186	383.1
Richmond Hill	City (lower-tier)	185,541	1,838.0	195,022	1,928.8	202,022	2,004.4
Scugog	Township (lower-tier)	21,569	45.4	21,617	45.5	21,581	45.5
Toronto	City (single-tier)	2,615,060	4,149.5	2,731,571	4,334.4	2,794,356	4,427.8
Uxbridge	Township (lower-tier)	20,623	49.0	21,176	50.3	21,556	51.3
Vaughan	City (lower-tier)	288,301	1,054.0	306,233	1,119.4	323,103	1,185.9
Whitby	Town (lower-tier)	122,022	832.7	128,377	875.4	138,501	944.2
Whitchurch-Stouffville	Town/Municipality (lower-tier)	37,628	182.3	45,837	222.3	49,864	241.6
Total		6,053,823	937.50	6,417,124	996.54	6,711,985	1,033.77

^a Inhabitants per km^{2}
