= John Godkin Giles =

Canadian politician

Member of the Legislative Assembly of Ontario for Leeds South
- In office December 9, 1873 – December 23, 1874
- Preceded by: Herbert Stone MacDonald
- Succeeded by: Robert Henry Preston

Personal details
- Born: May 17, 1834 Athens, Ontario
- Died: March 12, 1903 (aged 68) Brockville, Ontario
- Party: Conservative
- Spouse: Caroline (Carrie) Teskey
- Children: One daughter, Helena
- Profession: Medical Doctor

John Godkin Giles (May 17, 1834 – March 12, 1903) was an Ontario medical doctor and political figure. He represented Leeds South in the Legislative Assembly of Ontario as a Conservative member from 1873 to 1874.

Giles was born in Farmersville, near Napanee, Ontario, in 1834, one of ten children born to William Godkin Giles (1789–1867) and Sarah Richards (1791–1867). He was trained as a medical doctor and, on August 26, 1871, he was appointed as an Associate Coroner for the United Counties of Leeds and Grenville. He was married in Appleton, Ontario, on July 6, 1864, to Caroline (Carrie) Teskey (1840–1924) of Ramsay Township and they had one daughter.

Giles was elected in a by-election called when Herbert Stone MacDonald, the sitting Conservative MPP resigned to become a Judge. Giles served for only one year and his Legislative Service included membership on only one Standing Committee (Private Bills). In 1874, he was defeated for the Conservative nomination by Robert Henry Preston who went on to win in the general election held early the next year.

He died in Leeds County, Ontario, in 1903.

== Electoral history ==
Ontario provincial by-election, December 1873: Leeds South Resignation of Herbert Stone MacDonald
Party	Candidate	Votes
Conservative	John Godkin Giles	Acclaimed
Source: History of the Electoral Districts, Legislatures and Ministries of the Province of Ontario
