= Harry McLean =

Harry McLean may refer to:

- H. Daniel McLean (1906–1964), merchant and political figure on Prince Edward Island
- Harry Falconer McLean (1881–1961), Canadian railway contractor and philanthropist
