= William Richardson (Ontario politician) =

Canadian politician from Ontario

Member of the Ontario Provincial Parliament for Leeds South
- In office June 5, 1879 – February 1, 1883
- Preceded by: Robert Henry Preston
- Succeeded by: Robert Henry Preston

Personal details
- Party: Conservative

William Richardson was a Canadian politician from Ontario. He represented Leeds South in the Legislative Assembly of Ontario from 1879 to 1883.

== See also ==
- 4th Parliament of Ontario
