= Hugh Reynolds =

Hugh Reynolds may refer to:

- Hugh Reynolds (American politician), member of the Wisconsin State Senate
- Hugh Reynolds (Canadian politician), member of the Ontario Provincial Parliament

== See also ==
- Hugh Reynolds Rathbone, British merchant and politician
- Sidney Hugh Reynolds, English geologist, paleontologist, and zoologist
