= Henry Dolphus Smith =

Canadian politician

MPP for Leeds North and Grenville North
- In office September 3, 1867 – February 25, 1871

Personal details
- Born: December 23, 1819 Wolford Township, Grenville County, Upper Canada
- Died: November 22, 1889 (aged 69) Omaha, Nebraska, US
- Party: Liberal Party of Ontario

Henry Dolphus Smith (December 23, 1819 – November 22, 1889) was an Ontario political figure. He represented Leeds North and Grenville North in the Legislative Assembly of Ontario as a Liberal member from 1867 to 1871.

He was born in Wolford Township, Grenville County, Upper Canada, in 1819, the son of the Methodist minister William Smith. He married Josephine Bass. Smith operated an iron foundry. He served as reeve of Wolford and of Merrickville. Before he was elected to the Ontario legislature, Smith ran unsuccessfully three times for the same seat in the legislative assembly of the Province of Canada. He defeated Ogle Gowan in the 1867 general election; he was defeated by Henry Merrick in the general election that followed in 1871.

He died in Nebraska in 1889.

== Electoral history ==
1867 Ontario general election: Leeds North and Grenville North
Party	Candidate	Votes	%
Liberal	Henry Dolphus Smith	962	56.19
Conservative	O.R. Gowan	750	43.81
Total valid votes		1,712	78.28
Eligible voters		2,187	
Liberal pickup new district.			
Source: Elections Ontario

1871 Ontario general election: Leeds North and Grenville North
Party	Candidate	Votes	%	±%
Conservative	Henry Merrick	723	61.01	+17.20
Liberal	Henry Dolphus Smith	462	38.99	−17.20
Turnout		1,185	52.71	−25.57
Eligible voters		2,248		
Conservative gain from Liberal		Swing		+17.20
Source: Elections Ontario

1875 Ontario general election: Leeds North and Grenville North
Party	Candidate	Votes	%	±%
Conservative	Henry Merrick	1,035	61.57	+0.56
Independent	Henry Dolphus Smith	646	38.43	−0.56
Turnout		1,681	66.63	+13.91
Eligible voters		2,523		
Conservative hold		Swing		+0.56
Source: Elections Ontario
