= James Auld (politician) =

Canadian politician (1921–1982)

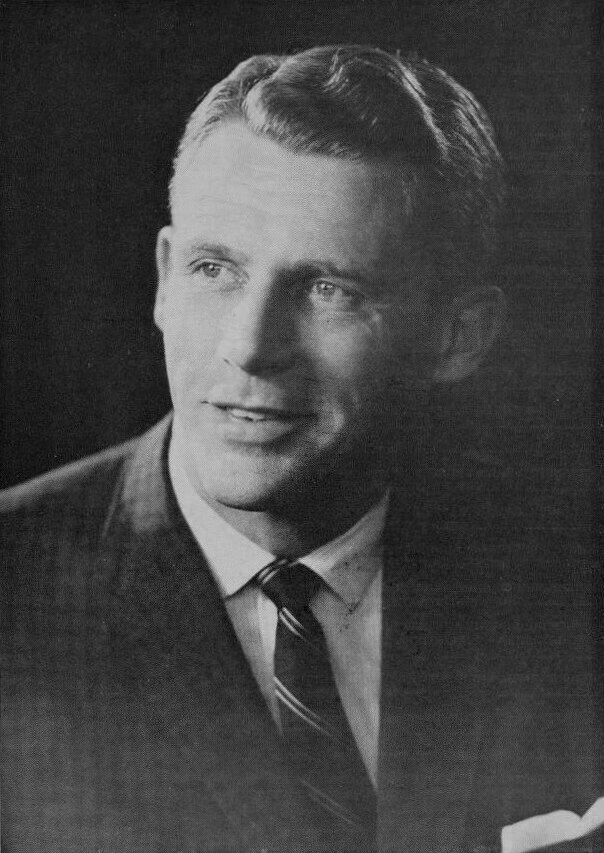

Member of the Ontario Provincial Parliament for Leeds
- In office 1954–1981
- Preceded by: Charles MacOdrum
- Succeeded by: Bob Runciman

Personal details
- Born: July 22, 1921 Toronto, Ontario
- Died: June 30, 1982 (aged 60) Brockville, Ontario
- Party: Progressive Conservative
- Spouse: Nancy Eleanor Gilmour
- Occupation: Wholesaler

Military service
- Branch/service: Canadian Army
- Rank: Captain
- Unit: Queen's Own Rifles
- Battles/wars: D-Day landings

James Alexander Charles Auld (July 22, 1921 – June 30, 1982) was an Ontario political figure. He represented Leeds in the Legislative Assembly of Ontario from 1954 to 1981 as a Progressive Conservative member.

== Background ==
He was born in Toronto, the son of James Carswell Auld, and educated in Toronto and at the University of Toronto. In 1946, he married Nancy Eleanor Gilmour. Auld served as captain in the Queen's Own Rifles. He participated in the D-Day landings at Normandy in 1944. He worked as a wholesaler in Brockville.

== Politics ==
He was a member of the town council for Brockville.

In 1954 he was elected in a by-election in the provincial riding of Leeds to replace Charles MacOdrum who had died earlier in the year. He beat Liberal candidate Mary Sheldon by over 5,000 votes. He was re-elected in every election up until his retirement in 1981, serving a total of 27 years.

He served in the provincial cabinet as Minister of Transport from 1962 to 1963, Minister of Travel and Publicity from 1963 to 1964, Minister of Tourism and Information from 1964 to 1971, Minister of Public Works from 1971 to 1972, Minister of the Environment from 1972 to 1974, Minister of Colleges and Universities from 1974 to 1975, Minister of Government Services in 1977, Minister of Energy from 1978 to 1979 and Minister of Natural Resources from 1978 to 1981. Auld was also Chair of the Management Board of Cabinet and commissioner on the Board of Internal Economy.

=== Cabinet positions ===
Davis ministry, Province of Ontario (1971–1985)
Cabinet posts (7)
Predecessor	Office	Successor
Frank Miller	Minister of Natural Resources; 1978–1981	Alan Pope
Reuben Baetz	Minister of Energy; 1978–1979	Bob Welch
John Smith	Minister of Government Services; 1977 (June–September)	George McCague
Eric Winkler	Chair of the Management Board of Cabinet; 1975–1978	George McCague
John White	Minister of Colleges and Universities; 1974–1975	Harry Parrott
George Kerr	Minister of Environment; 1972–1974	Bill Newman
John Simonett	Minister of Public Works; 1971–1972	James Snow
Robarts ministry, Province of Ontario (1961–1971)
Cabinet posts (2)
Predecessor	Office	Successor
Bryan Cathcart	Minister of Travel and Publicity (Note: On March 25, 1964 it was renamed as the Minister of Tourism and Information.); 1963–1971	Fernand Guindon
Leslie Rowntree	Minister of Transport; 1962–1963	Irwin Haskett

== Later life ==
After his retirement from politics, he was appointed as chairman of the St. Lawrence Parks Commission in May 1981. On June 1, 1982, he was appointed as chairman of the Electoral Expenses Commission. On June 30 he was found unconscious at his desk and died later in hospital after suffering a heart attack. He was 60 years old.
