= Henry Merrick =

Canadian politician

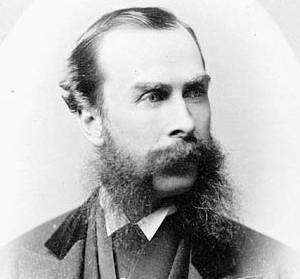
Henry Merrick Source: Library and Archives Canada

Henry Merrick (1837 - August 9, 1927) was an Ontario businessman and political figure. He represented Leeds North and Grenville North in the Legislative Assembly of Ontario as a Conservative member from 1871 to 1886.

He was born in Merrickville in 1837, the son of Stephen Merrick and the grandson of its founder, William Merrick. He operated the family mill for a number of years after his father died. Merrick served as mayor of Merrickville. He also served as Grand Master for the Orange Lodge in Canada. Merrick redeveloped the local foundry business after he retired from politics.

== Electoral history ==
1871 Ontario general election: Leeds North and Grenville North
Party	Candidate	Votes	%	±%
Conservative	Henry Merrick	723	61.01	+17.20
Liberal	Henry Dolphus Smith	462	38.99	−17.20
Turnout		1,185	52.71	−25.57
Eligible voters		2,248		
Conservative gain from Liberal		Swing		+17.20
Source: Elections Ontario

1875 Ontario general election: Leeds North and Grenville North
Party	Candidate	Votes	%	±%
Conservative	Henry Merrick	1,035	61.57	+0.56
Independent	Henry Dolphus Smith	646	38.43	−0.56
Turnout		1,681	66.63	+13.91
Eligible voters		2,523		
Conservative hold		Swing		+0.56
Source: Elections Ontario

1879 Ontario general election: Leeds North and Grenville North
Party	Candidate	Votes	%	±%
Conservative	Henry Merrick	1,084	59.53	−2.04
Liberal	Mr. Meikle	737	40.47	
Total valid votes		1,821	64.90	−1.73
Eligible voters		2,806		
Conservative hold		Swing		−2.04
Source: Elections Ontario
