= John Robertson Dargavel =

Canadian politician

Ontario MPP
- In office 1905–1919
- Preceded by: Walter Beatty
- Succeeded by: Andrew Wellington Gray
- Constituency: Leeds

Personal details
- Born: May 3, 1846 Crosby Township, Leeds County, Canada West
- Died: January 28, 1930 (aged 83)
- Party: Conservative
- Spouse: Mary Jane Hopkins (m. 1870)
- Occupation: Farmer

John Robertson Dargavel (May 3, 1846 – January 28, 1930) was an Ontario farmer, merchant and political figure. He represented Leeds in the Legislative Assembly of Ontario from 1905 to 1919 as a Conservative member.

He was born in Crosby Township, Leeds County, Canada West, the son of Robert Dargavel, whose suggestion it was in 1827 to name the town of Elgin in honour of Lord Elgin, the one time Governor General. In 1870, John Robertson married Mary Jane Hopkins. Prior to his service as an MPP, he served as clerk for South Crosby Township and as a member of the Elgin School Board. Dargravel was a dairy farmer and was president of the Eastern Ontario Dairymen's Association. He owned a large general store in Elgin.

John Robertson's son was James Sawtell Dargavel, who took over the business when his father took office as MPP. James Sawtell expanded the business to include the cheese mill at Chaffey's Lock.
