= Walter Beatty =

Canadian politician

Ontario MPP
- In office 1894–1904
- Preceded by: Robert Henry Preston
- Succeeded by: John Robertson Dargavel
- Constituency: Leeds

Personal details
- Born: January 3, 1836 Lansdowne, Upper Canada
- Died: January 5, 1911 (aged 75)
- Party: Conservative
- Relations: William Rabb Beatty, brother
- Occupation: Land surveyor

Walter Beatty (January 3, 1836 – January 5, 1911) was a Canadian land surveyor and political figure. He represented Leeds in the Legislative Assembly of Ontario from 1894 to 1904 as a Conservative member.

He was born in Lansdowne, Upper Canada in 1836, educated in Brockville and qualified as a Dominion Land Surveyor in 1872, undertaking surveys in what is now Alberta, Saskatchewan and Manitoba. He served under General Middleton in the Intelligence Corps during the North-West Rebellion. Beatty served as warden for the United Counties of Leeds and Grenville in 1890 and 1891. He died in Delta in 1911.

His brother William Rabb Beatty also served in the provincial assembly.

Beatty Lake in Manitoba was named after him.
