= Walter Bain Reynolds =

Canadian politician

Ontario MPP
- In office 1937–1949
- Preceded by: George Taylor Fulford
- Succeeded by: Hugh Alexander Reynolds
- Constituency: Leeds

Personal details
- Born: May 24, 1869 Brockville, Ontario
- Died: March 12, 1949 (aged 79) Toronto, Ontario
- Party: Conservative
- Spouse: Margaret Grant (m. 1921)

Walter Bain Reynolds (May 24, 1869 – March 12, 1949) was a politician in Ontario, Canada. He represented Leeds in the Legislative Assembly of Ontario from 1937 to 1949 as a Progressive Conservative.

The son of James Reynolds and Alice Riley, he was born in Brockville and was educated there. In 1921, Reynolds married Margaret Grant. He served as a public school trustee from 1905 to 1915, served on the public utilities commission from 1914 to 1922 and was mayor of Brockville from 1923 to 1928.

During his time as mayor, Reynolds donated a swimming pavilion with change rooms to St. Lawrence Park on the Brockville waterfront.

He died in office in 1949.
