= List of villages in Ontario =

A village is a sub-type of municipalities in the Canadian province of Ontario. A village can have the municipal status of either a single-tier or lower-tier municipality.

Ontario has 11 villages that had a cumulative population of 13,695 and an average population of 1,245 in the 2016 Census. Ontario's largest and smallest villages are Casselman and Thornloe with populations of 3,548 and 112 respectively.

== History ==
Under the former Municipal Act, 1990, a village was both an urban and a local municipality. Under this former legislation, a locality with a population of 500 or more could have been incorporated as a village by Ontario's Municipal Board upon review of an application from 75 or more residents of the locality.

In the transition to the Municipal Act, 2001, the above designations and requirements were abandoned and, as at December 31, 2002, every village that:

- "existed and formed part of a county, a regional or district municipality or the County of Oxford for municipal purposes" became a lower-tier municipality yet retained its name as a village; and
- "existed and did not form part of a county, a regional or district municipality or the County of Oxford for municipal purposes" became a single-tier municipality yet retained its name as a village.

The current legislation also provides lower and single-tier municipalities with the authority to name themselves as "villages", or other former municipal status types such as "cities", "towns" or "townships", or generically as "municipalities".

== Villages in Ontario ==
Village	Municipal status	Geographic area	Population (2021)	Population (2016)	Population (2011)	Change % 2016-21	Area (km^{2})	Population density
Burk's Falls	Single-tier	Parry Sound	957	981	967	−2.4	3.07	310.0
Casselman	Lower-tier	Prescott and Russell	3,960	3,548	3,626	11.6	5.12	771.9
Hilton Beach	Single-tier	Algoma	198	171	145	15.8	2.62	78.6
Merrickville-Wolford	Lower-tier	Leeds and Grenville	3,135	3,067	2,850	2.2	214.33	14.6
Newbury	Lower-tier	Middlesex	440	466	447	−5.6	1.77	248.6
Oil Springs	Lower-tier	Lambton	647	648	704	−0.2	8.14	79.5
Point Edward	Lower-tier	Lambton	1,930	2,037	2,034	−5.3	3.3	585.0
South River	Single-tier	Parry Sound	1,101	1,114	1,049	−1.2	4.11	268.0
Sundridge	Single-tier	Parry Sound	938	961	985	−2.4	2.25	417.7
Thornloe	Single-tier	Timiskaming	92	112	123	−17.9	6.59	14.0
Westport	Lower-tier	Leeds and Grenville	634	590	628	7.5	2.19	289.0
Total			14,032	13,695	13,558	2.5	253.49	55.36
Total lower-tier			10,746	10,356	10,289	3.8	234.85	45.76
Total single-tier			3,286	3,339	3,269	−1.6	18.64	176.29

== See also ==
- List of cities in Ontario
- List of communities in Ontario
- List of municipalities in Ontario
- List of towns in Ontario
- List of township municipalities in Ontario
- List of unincorporated communities in Ontario
