= Hugh Reynolds (Canadian politician) =

Canadian politician from Ontario

Member of the Ontario Provincial Parliament for Leeds
- In office October 31, 1949 – October 6, 1951
- Preceded by: Walter Bain Reynolds
- Succeeded by: Charles MacOdrum

Personal details
- Party: Progressive Conservative

Hugh Alexander Reynolds was a Canadian politician who was Progressive Conservative MPP for Leeds from 1949 to 1951.

== See also ==
- 23rd Parliament of Ontario
