= Frederick James Skinner =

Canadian politician

Ontario MPP
- In office 1926–1933
- Preceded by: Andrew Wellington Gray
- Succeeded by: George Taylor Fulford
- Constituency: Leeds

Personal details
- Born: April 8, 1867 Gananoque, Ontario
- Died: November 5, 1933 (aged 66)
- Party: Conservative
- Spouse: Bertha Van Heuson (m. 1894)
- Occupation: Manufacturer

Frederick James Skinner (April 8, 1867 – November 5, 1933) was a wealthy Ontario manufacturer, Member of Parliament, and political figure, who represented Leeds in the Legislative Assembly of Ontario as a Conservative member from 1926 until his death in 1933.

The son of Sylvester Case Skinner, he was born and educated in his hometown of Gananoque, Ontario. In 1894, he married Bertha Van Heuson. He was president and general manager of the Skinner Company Limited, established by his father, which manufactured various farm tools and hardware for carriages. Under Skinner's management, the company began to manufacture metal bumpers for vehicles. During World War I, its production was converted to small hardware for use by the armed forces. After the war, the plant manufactured chrome automobile bumpers for General Motors. In 1929, the company was sold to the Houdaille-Hershey Corporation, although Skinner continued to serve as president. In 1930, the plant was moved to Oshawa. Skinner died in 1933 and his son Frederick Van Heusen Skinner took over the company as the president. Today, the home Mr. Skinner built in Gananoque in 1906 is a nationally protected heritage site.
