= Andrew Wellington Gray =

Canadian politician from Ontario

Member of the Ontario Provincial Parliament for Leeds
- In office October 20, 1919 – October 18, 1926
- Preceded by: John Robertson Dargavel
- Succeeded by: Frederick James Skinner

Personal details
- Party: Conservative

Andrew Wellington Gray was a Canadian politician from the Conservative Party of Ontario. He represented Leeds in the Legislative Assembly of Ontario from 1919 to 1926.

== See also ==
- 15th Parliament of Ontario
- 16th Parliament of Ontario
