= Leeds (provincial electoral district) =

Ontario electoral district

Defunct provincial electoral district
- Legislature: Legislative Assembly of Ontario
- District created: 1886
- District abolished: 1986
- First contested: 1886
- Last contested: 1985

Leeds was an electoral riding in Ontario, Canada. It was created in 1886 from Leeds South and Leeds North and Grenville North ridings and was abolished in 1986 before the 1987 election.

== Members of Provincial Parliament ==
=== Leeds North and Grenville North (1867–1883) ===
Assembly	Years	Member	Party
1st	1867–1871	Henry Dolphus Smith	Liberal
2nd	1871–1875	Henry Merrick	Conservative
3rd	1875–1879	Henry Merrick	Conservative
4th	1879–1883	Henry Merrick	Conservative
5th	1883–1886	Henry Merrick	Conservative
Merged with Leeds South into Leeds

=== Leeds South (1867–1883) ===
Assembly	Years	Member	Party
1st	1867–1871	Benjamin Tett	Conservative
2nd	1871–1873	Herbert Stone MacDonald	Conservative
2nd	1873–1879	John Godkin Giles	Conservative
3rd	1875–1879	Robert Henry Preston	Conservative
4th	1879–1883	William Richardson	Conservative
5th	1883–1886	Robert Henry Preston	Conservative
Merged with Leeds North and Grenville North into Leeds

=== Leeds (1886–1985) ===
Assembly	Years	Member	Party
6th	1886–1890	Robert Henry Preston	Conservative
7th	1890–1894	Robert Henry Preston	Conservative
8th	1894–1898	Walter Beatty	Conservative
9th	1898–1902	Walter Beatty	Conservative
10th	1902–1904	Walter Beatty	Conservative
11th	1905–1908	John Robertson Dargavel	Conservative
12th	1908–1911	John Robertson Dargavel	Conservative
13th	1911–1914	John Robertson Dargavel	Conservative
14th	1914–1919	John Robertson Dargavel	Conservative
15th	1919–1923	Andrew Wellington Gray	Conservative
16th	1923–1926	Andrew Wellington Gray	Conservative
17th	1926–1929	Frederick James Skinner	Conservative
18th	1929–1933	Frederick James Skinner	Conservative
Merged with Brockville
19th	1934–1937	George Taylor Fulford	Liberal
20th	1937–1943	Walter Bain Reynolds	Progressive Conservative
21st	1943–1945	Walter Bain Reynolds	Progressive Conservative
22nd	1945–1948	Walter Bain Reynolds	Progressive Conservative
23rd	1948–1949	Walter Bain Reynolds	Progressive Conservative
23rd	1949–1951	Hugh Alexander Reynolds	Progressive Conservative
24th	1951–1954	Charles Gordon MacOdrum	Progressive Conservative
24th	1954–1955	James Auld	Progressive Conservative
25th	1955–1959	James Auld	Progressive Conservative
26th	1959–1963	James Auld	Progressive Conservative
27th	1963–1967	James Auld	Progressive Conservative
28th	1967–1971	James Auld	Progressive Conservative
29th	1971–1975	James Auld	Progressive Conservative
30th	1975–1977	James Auld	Progressive Conservative
31st	1977–1981	James Auld	Progressive Conservative
32nd	1981–1985	Bob Runciman	Progressive Conservative
33rd	1985–1987	Bob Runciman	Progressive Conservative
Sourced from the Ontario Legislative Assembly
Merged into Leeds—Grenville before the 1987 election

== Election results ==
=== Leeds (1886–1985) ===
1985 Ontario general election
Party	Candidate	Votes	%	±%
Progressive Conservative	Bob Runciman	11,809	51.61	–12.80
Liberal	Dolores Wing	6,748	29.49	+7.70
New Democratic	Bob Smith	3,583	15.66	+1.86
Independent	Mackie Morrison	741	3.24	–
Total valid votes		22,881	99.34	
Total rejected ballots		151	0.66	+0.29
Turnout		23,032	58.68	+0.26
Eligible voters		39,253		
Progressive Conservative hold		Swing		–10.25
Source: Elections Ontario

1981 Ontario general election
Party	Candidate	Votes	%	±%
Progressive Conservative	Bob Runciman	13,725	64.41	–3.24
Liberal	John Fournell	4,643	21.79	+4.93
New Democratic	Bob Smith	2,940	13.80	–1.69
Total valid votes		21,308	99.63	
Total rejected ballots		79	0.37	–0.01
Turnout		21,387	58.41	–3.83
Eligible voters		36,614		
Progressive Conservative hold		Swing		–4.08
Source: Elections Ontario

1977 Ontario general election
Party	Candidate	Votes	%	±%
Progressive Conservative	James Auld	14,853	67.65	+9.45
Liberal	John A. Carley	3,702	16.86	–1.02
New Democratic	Jim Morrison	3,400	15.49	–8.43
Total valid votes		21,955	99.62	
Total rejected ballots		83	0.38	+0.06
Turnout		22,038	62.24	–8.41
Eligible voters		35,406		
Progressive Conservative hold		Swing		+5.23
Source: Elections Ontario

1975 Ontario general election
Party	Candidate	Votes	%	±%
Progressive Conservative	James Auld	13,913	58.21	–7.24
New Democratic	John Fielding	5,716	23.91	+3.94
Liberal	Edward J. Lanigan	4,274	17.88	+3.30
Total valid votes		23,903	99.69	
Total rejected ballots		75	0.31	–0.13
Turnout		23,978	70.66	–4.60
Eligible voters		33,936		
Progressive Conservative hold		Swing		–5.59
Source: Elections Ontario

1971 Ontario general election
Party	Candidate	Votes	%	±%
Progressive Conservative	James Auld	15,477	65.45	–2.92
New Democratic	John Fielding	4,723	19.97	+14.93
Liberal	Fred Carpenter	3,447	14.58	–12.00
Total valid votes		23,647	99.56	
Total rejected ballots		105	0.44	–0.31
Turnout		23,752	75.26	+10.45
Eligible voters		31,561		
Progressive Conservative hold		Swing		–8.93
Source: Elections Ontario

1967 Ontario general election
Party	Candidate	Votes	%	±%
Progressive Conservative	James Auld	12,127	68.38	–7.30
Liberal	Duncan C. Fraser	4,714	26.58	+6.15
New Democratic	Paul C. Langley	895	5.05	+1.15
Total valid votes		17,736	99.25	
Total rejected ballots		134	0.75	–0.10
Turnout		17,870	64.81	+1.78
Eligible voters		27,572		
Progressive Conservative hold		Swing		–6.73
Source: Elections Ontario

1963 Ontario general election
Party	Candidate	Votes	%	±%
Progressive Conservative	James Auld	12,711	75.68	+10.32
Liberal	Pieter Toxopeus	3,431	20.43	–10.22
New Democratic	William F. Thompson	654	3.89	–0.10
Total valid votes		16,796	99.15	
Total rejected ballots		144	0.85	–0.22
Turnout		16,940	63.03	–4.11
Eligible voters		26,875		
Progressive Conservative hold		Swing		+10.27
Source: Elections Ontario

1959 Ontario general election
Party	Candidate	Votes	%	±%
Progressive Conservative	James Auld	11,318	65.35	+2.01
Liberal	James O. Cunningham	5,308	30.65	–6.01
Co-operative Commonwealth	Joseph Porkert	692	4.00	–
Total valid votes		17,318	98.93	
Total rejected ballots		188	1.07	+0.10
Turnout		17,506	67.15	–1.82
Eligible voters		26,071		
Progressive Conservative hold		Swing		+4.01
Source: Elections Ontario

1955 Ontario general election
Party	Candidate	Votes	%	±%
Progressive Conservative	James Auld	10,632	63.34	–6.45
Liberal	Talmage Stone	6,153	36.66	+6.45
Total valid votes		16,785	99.03	
Total rejected ballots		165	0.97	–0.13
Turnout		16,950	68.96	+9.03
Eligible voters		24,578		
Progressive Conservative hold		Swing		–6.45
Source: Elections Ontario

Ontario provincial by-election, September 16, 1954 Death of Charles MacOdrum
Party	Candidate	Votes	%	±%
Progressive Conservative	James Auld	10,009	69.79	+8.78
Liberal	Elizabeth Sheldon	4,332	30.21	–8.78
Total valid votes		14,341	98.90	
Total rejected ballots		160	1.10	+0.56
Turnout		14,501	59.94	–14.45
Eligible voters		24,194		
Progressive Conservative hold		Swing		+8.78
Source: Elections Ontario

1951 Ontario general election
Party	Candidate	Votes	%	±%
Progressive Conservative	Charles MacOdrum	10,658	61.01	+3.80
Liberal	Thomas D. Dailey	6,810	38.99	–3.80
Total valid votes		17,468	99.46	
Total rejected ballots		95	0.54	+0.07
Turnout		17,563	74.39	–0.75
Eligible voters		23,610		
Progressive Conservative hold		Swing		+3.80
Source: Elections Ontario

Ontario provincial by-election, October 31, 1949 Death of Walter Bain Reynolds
Party	Candidate	Votes	%	±%
Progressive Conservative	Hugh Reynolds	10,627	57.21	+5.28
Liberal	Ernest Miller	7,947	42.79	+5.85
Total valid votes		18,574	99.53	
Total rejected ballots		88	0.47	–0.25
Turnout		18,662	75.14	+0.74
Eligible voters		24,836		
Progressive Conservative hold		Swing		–0.29
Source: Elections Ontario1

1948 Ontario general election
Party	Candidate	Votes	%	±%
Progressive Conservative	Walter Bain Reynolds	9,018	51.94	–6.11
Liberal	Ernest J. Miller	6,413	36.93	+2.97
Co-operative Commonwealth	William John Miller	1,932	11.13	+3.14
Total valid votes		17,363	99.28	
Total rejected ballots		126	0.72	+0.04
Turnout		17,489	74.41	–0.78
Eligible voters		23,505		
Progressive Conservative hold		Swing		–4.54
Source: Elections Ontario

1945 Ontario general election
Party	Candidate	Votes	%	±%
Progressive Conservative	Walter Bain Reynolds	10,192	58.05	+6.53
Liberal	Ezra W. Smith	5,963	33.96	–2.21
Co-operative Commonwealth	Robert A. Walker	1,403	7.99	–4.33
Total valid votes		17,558	99.32	
Total rejected ballots		121	0.68	+0.14
Turnout		17,679	75.19	+8.67
Eligible voters		23,513		
Progressive Conservative hold		Swing		+4.37
Source: Elections Ontario

1943 Ontario general election
Party	Candidate	Votes	%	±%
Progressive Conservative	Walter Bain Reynolds	7,666	51.52	–0.33
Liberal	Josephine Fulford	5,382	36.17	–11.99
Co-operative Commonwealth	James G. Lawson	1,833	12.32	–
Total valid votes		14,881	99.46	
Total rejected ballots		81	0.54	+0.05
Turnout		14,962	66.52	–12.90
Eligible voters		22,492		
Progressive Conservative hold		Swing		+5.83
Source: Elections Ontario

1937 Ontario general election
Party	Candidate	Votes	%	±%
Conservative	Walter Bain Reynolds	10,339	51.85	+5.09
Liberal	George Fulford	9,603	48.15	–5.09
Total valid votes		19,942	99.51	
Total rejected ballots		98	0.49	–0.20
Turnout		20,040	79.42	+1.47
Eligible voters		25,232		
Conservative gain from Liberal		Swing		+5.09
Source: Elections Ontario

1934 Ontario general election
Party	Candidate	Votes	%	±%
Liberal	George Fulford	10,195	53.24	+24.31
Conservative	Hezekiah Allan Clark	8,953	46.76	–2.51
Total valid votes		19,148	99.31	
Total rejected ballots		133	0.69	–0.21
Turnout		19,281	77.95	+4.26
Eligible voters		24,735		
Liberal gain from Conservative		Swing		+13.41
Source: Elections Ontario

1929 Ontario general election
Party	Candidate	Votes	%	±%
Conservative	Frederick James Skinner	3,755	49.27	–2.21
Liberal	John William Sinclair	2,205	28.93	–19.59
Prohibitionist	Thomas I. Ellis	1,661	21.80	–
Total valid votes		7,621	99.10	
Total rejected ballots		69	0.90	+0.22
Turnout		7,690	73.69	+4.33
Eligible voters		10,436		
Conservative hold		Swing		+10.90
Source: Elections Ontario

1926 Ontario general election
Party	Candidate	Votes	%	±%
Conservative	Frederick James Skinner	3,702	51.48	–5.86
Liberal	John William Sinclair	3,489	48.52	–
Total valid votes		7,191	99.32	
Total rejected ballots		49	0.68	+0.12
Turnout		7,240	69.36	+8.70
Eligible voters		10,439		
Conservative hold		Swing		–2.93
Source: Elections Ontario

1923 Ontario general election
Party	Candidate	Votes	%	±%
Conservative	Andrew Wellington Gray	3,779	57.34	+2.76
United Farmers	John Beatty	2,811	42.66	–
Total valid votes		6,590	99.44	
Total rejected ballots		37	0.56	–3.59
Turnout		6,627	60.65	–14.54
Eligible voters		10,926		
Conservative hold		Swing		+1.38
Source: Elections Ontario

1919 Ontario general election
Party	Candidate	Votes	%	±%
Conservative	Andrew Wellington Gray	4,351	54.59	–1.17
Liberal	John William Sinclair	3,620	45.41	+1.17
Total valid votes		7,971	95.85	
Total rejected ballots		345	4.15	+3.47
Turnout		8,316	75.20	–4.34
Eligible voters		11,059		
Conservative hold		Swing		–1.17
Source: Elections Ontario

1914 Ontario general election
Party	Candidate	Votes	%	±%
Conservative	John Robertson Dargavel	2,025	55.75	+3.64
Liberal	John William Sinclair	1,607	44.25	–3.64
Total valid votes		3,632	99.32	
Total rejected ballots		25	0.68	–0.04
Turnout		3,657	79.53	+7.30
Eligible voters		4,598		
Conservative hold		Swing		+3.64
Source: Elections Ontario

1911 Ontario general election
Party	Candidate	Votes	%	±%
Conservative	John Robertson Dargavel	1,995	52.12	–0.24
Liberal	William John Wilson	1,833	47.88	+0.24
Total valid votes		3,828	99.27	
Total rejected ballots		28	0.73	–0.16
Turnout		3,856	72.24	–17.75
Eligible voters		5,338		
Conservative hold		Swing		–0.24
Source: Elections Ontario

1908 Ontario general election
Party	Candidate	Votes	%	±%
Conservative	John Robertson Dargavel	2,102	52.35	–12.54
Liberal	William John Wilson	1,913	47.65	+12.54
Total valid votes		4,015	99.11	
Total rejected ballots		36	0.89	+0.76
Turnout		4,051	89.98	+34.40
Eligible voters		4,502		
Conservative hold		Swing		–12.54
Source: Elections Ontario

1905 Ontario general election
Party	Candidate	Votes	%	±%
Conservative	John Robertson Dargavel	1,983	64.89	+7.85
Liberal	F. Chisholm	1,073	35.11	–7.85
Total valid votes		3,056	99.87	
Total rejected ballots		4	0.13	–0.88
Turnout		3,060	55.59	–9.61
Eligible voters		5,505		
Conservative hold		Swing		+7.85
Source: Elections Ontario

1902 Ontario general election
Party	Candidate	Votes	%	±%
Conservative	Walter Beatty	2,062	57.04	+1.23
Liberal	C. E. Britton	1,553	42.96	–1.23
Total valid votes		3,615	98.99	
Total rejected ballots		37	1.01	+0.46
Turnout		3,652	65.19	–2.18
Eligible voters		5,602		
Conservative hold		Swing		+1.23
Source: Elections Ontario

1898 Ontario general election
Party	Candidate	Votes	%	±%
Conservative	Walter Beatty	2,200	55.81	+0.66
Liberal	W. J. Webster	1,742	44.19	–
Total valid votes		3,942	99.45	
Total rejected ballots		22	0.56	–0.18
Turnout		3,964	67.37	+2.35
Eligible voters		5,884		
Conservative hold		Swing		+0.33
Source: Elections Ontario

1894 Ontario general election
Party	Candidate	Votes	%	±%
Conservative	Walter Beatty	1,999	55.14	–1.96
Liberal-Patrons of Industry	J. B. Wilson	1,626	44.86	–
Total valid votes		3,625	99.26	
Total rejected ballots		27	0.74	+0.24
Turnout		3,652	65.02	+7.32
Eligible voters		5,617		
Conservative hold		Swing		–0.98
Source: Elections Ontario

1890 Ontario general election
Party	Candidate	Votes	%	±%
Conservative	Robert Henry Preston	1,813	57.10	+2.24
Liberal	W. J. Webster	1,362	42.90	–2.24
Total valid votes		3,175	99.50	
Total rejected ballots		16	0.50	+0.20
Turnout		3,191	57.69	–12.58
Eligible voters		5,531		
Conservative hold		Swing		+2.24
Source: Elections Ontario

1886 Ontario general election
Party	Candidate	Votes	%	±%
Conservative	Robert Henry Preston	1,964	54.86	–
Liberal	William H. Fredenburgh	1,616	45.14	–
Total valid votes		3,580	99.69	
Total rejected ballots		11	0.31	–
Turnout		3,591	70.27	–
Eligible voters		5,110		
Source: Elections Ontario

=== Leeds North and Grenville North (1867–1883) ===
1883 Ontario general election: Leeds North and Grenville North
Party	Candidate	Votes	%	±%
Conservative	Henry Merrick	837	49.94	–9.59
Liberal	Francis Jones	836	49.88	+9.41
Independent Conservative	G. A. Montgomery	3	0.18	–
Total valid votes		1,676	100.00	
Total rejected ballots		–		
Turnout		1,676	60.18	–4.72
Eligible voters		2,785		
Conservative hold		Swing		–9.50
Source: Elections Ontario

1879 Ontario general election
Party	Candidate	Votes	%	±%
Conservative	Henry Merrick	1,084	59.53	−2.04
Liberal	Mr. Meikle	737	40.47	
Total valid votes		1,821	64.90	−1.73
Eligible voters		2,806		
Conservative hold		Swing		−2.04
Source: Elections Ontario

1875 Ontario general election
Party	Candidate	Votes	%	±%
Conservative	Henry Merrick	1,035	61.57	+0.56
Independent	Henry Dolphus Smith	646	38.43	−0.56
Turnout		1,681	66.63	+13.91
Eligible voters		2,523		
Conservative hold		Swing		+0.56
Source: Elections Ontario

1871 Ontario general election
Party	Candidate	Votes	%	±%
Conservative	Henry Merrick	723	61.01	+17.20
Liberal	Henry Dolphus Smith	462	38.99	−17.20
Turnout		1,185	52.71	−25.57
Eligible voters		2,248		
Conservative gain from Liberal		Swing		+17.20
Source: Elections Ontario

1867 Ontario general election
Party	Candidate	Votes	%
Liberal	Henry Dolphus Smith	962	56.19
Conservative	O.R. Gowan	750	43.81
Total valid votes		1,712	78.28
Eligible voters		2,187	
Liberal pickup new district.			
Source: Elections Ontario

=== Leeds South (1867–1883) ===
1883 Ontario general election: Leeds South
Party	Candidate	Votes	%	±%
Conservative	Robert Henry Preston	1,553	55.09	–1.83
Liberal	William H. Fredenburgh	1,266	44.91	–
Total valid votes		2,819	99.26	
Total rejected ballots		21	0.74	+0.74
Turnout		2,840	69.08	+11.67
Eligible voters		4,111		
Conservative hold		Swing		–0.91
Source: Elections Ontario

1879 Ontario general election
Party	Candidate	Votes	%	±%
Conservative	William Richardson	1,362	56.92	−1.78
Independent	Mr. Green	1,031	43.08	
Total valid votes		2,393	57.41	−22.45
Eligible voters		4,168		
Conservative hold		Swing		−1.78
Source: Elections Ontario

1875 Ontario general election
Party	Candidate	Votes	%
Conservative	Robert Henry Preston	1,481	58.70
Liberal	R. Fields	1,042	41.30
Turnout		2,523	79.87
Eligible voters		3,159	
Conservative hold			
Source: Elections Ontario

Ontario provincial by-election, December 1873 Resignation of Herbert Stone MacDonald
Party	Candidate	Votes
Conservative	John Godkin Giles	Acclaimed
Source: History of the Electoral Districts, Legislatures and Ministries of the Province of Ontario

1871 Ontario general election
Party	Candidate	Votes
Conservative	Herbert Stone MacDonald	Acclaimed
Source: Elections Ontario

1867 Ontario general election
Party	Candidate	Votes	%
Conservative	Benjamin Tett	1,380	50.13
Liberal	Stephen Richards	1,373	49.87
Total valid votes		2,753	83.96
Eligible voters		3,279	
Conservative pickup new district.			
Source: Elections Ontario
