= List of cities in Ontario =

Cities in the Canadian province of Ontario

A city is a subtype of municipalities in the Canadian province of Ontario. A city can have the municipal status of either a single-tier or lower-tier municipality. Prior to 2003, Ontario had minimum population thresholds of 15,000 and 25,000 for city status. Minimum population thresholds are no longer necessary for a municipality to brand itself as a city.

Ontario has 52 cities, which together had in 2016 a cumulative population of 9,900,179 and average population of 190,388. The most and least populous are Toronto and Dryden, with 2,794,356 and 7,749 residents, respectively. Ontario's newest city is Richmond Hill, whose council voted to change from a town to a city on March 26, 2019. Previous to that, Markham changed from a town to a city on July 1, 2012.

== History ==
Under the former Municipal Act, 1990, a city was both an urban and a local municipality. Under that act, the Ontario Municipal Board (OMB) could change the status of a village or town, upon its request, to a city if it had a population of 15,000 or more. The OMB could also incorporate a township as a city under the same conditions with the exception that the population requirements was 25,000 or more. In either event, if located within a county, authorization by the Minister of Municipal Affairs was also required.

In the transition to the Municipal Act, 2001, conventional municipal statuses and their associated population threshold requirements were abandoned. On December 31, 2002, every city that:

- "existed and formed part of a county, a regional or district municipality or the County of Oxford for municipal purposes" became a lower-tier municipality yet retained its name as a city; and
- "existed and did not form part of a county, a regional or district municipality or the County of Oxford for municipal purposes" became a single-tier municipality yet retained its name as a city.

The current legislation also provides lower- and single-tier municipalities with the authority to name themselves as "cities", or other former conventional municipal status types such as "towns", "villages" or "townships", or generically as "municipalities", regardless of population or characteristics.

== List ==
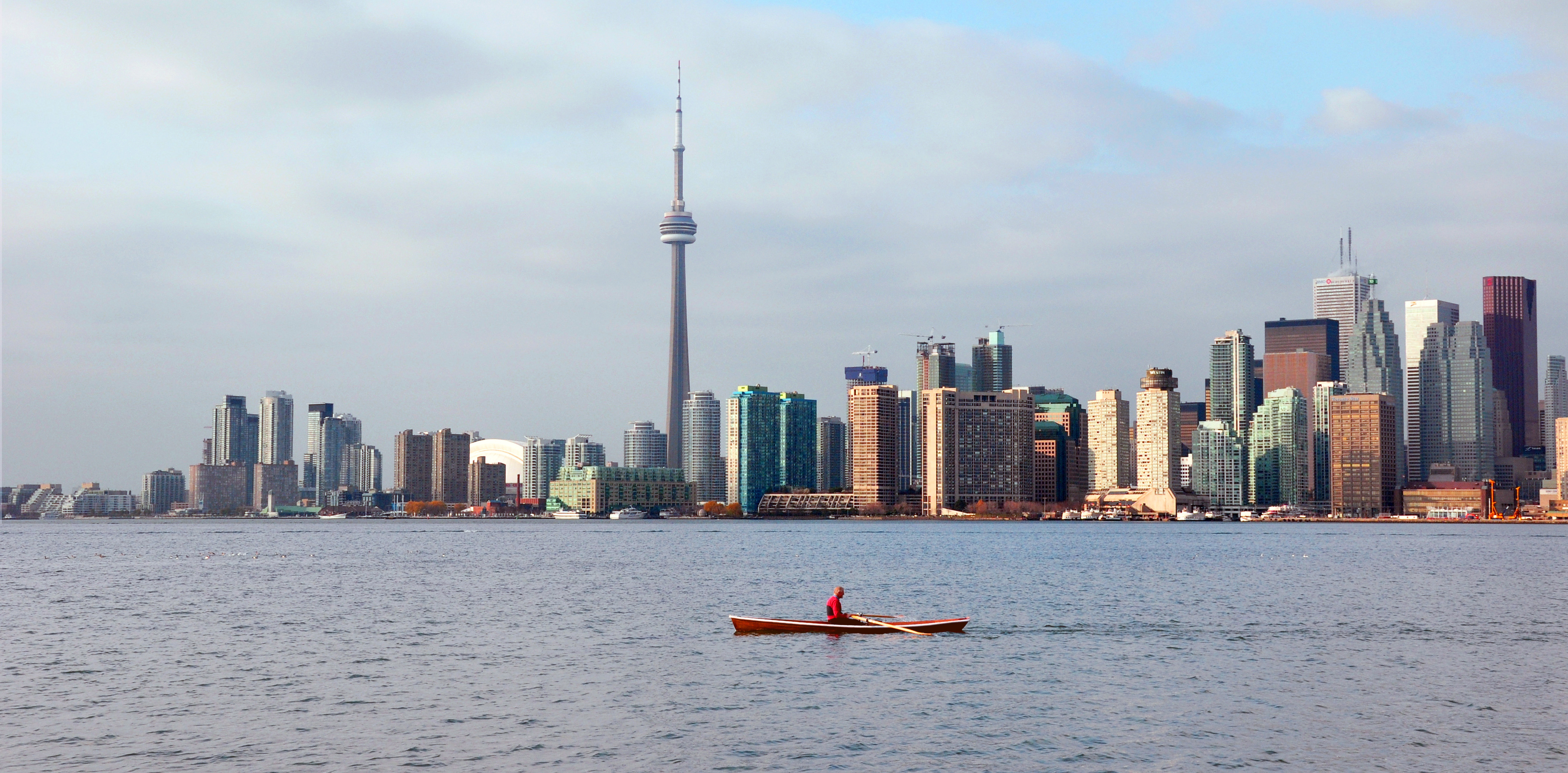
Toronto is Ontario's capital and Canada's largest city

Ottawa is Canada's capital and Ontario's second largest city

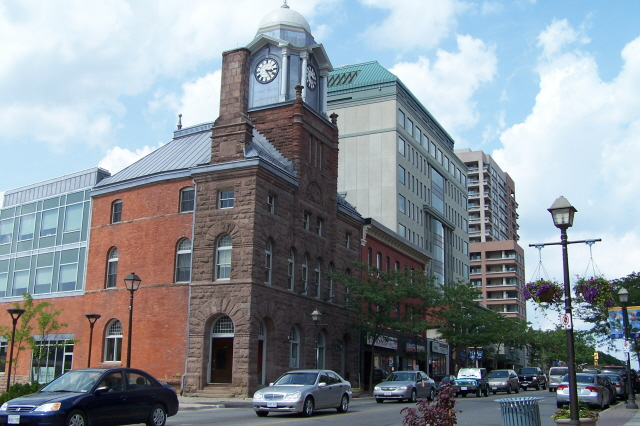
Downtown Brampton

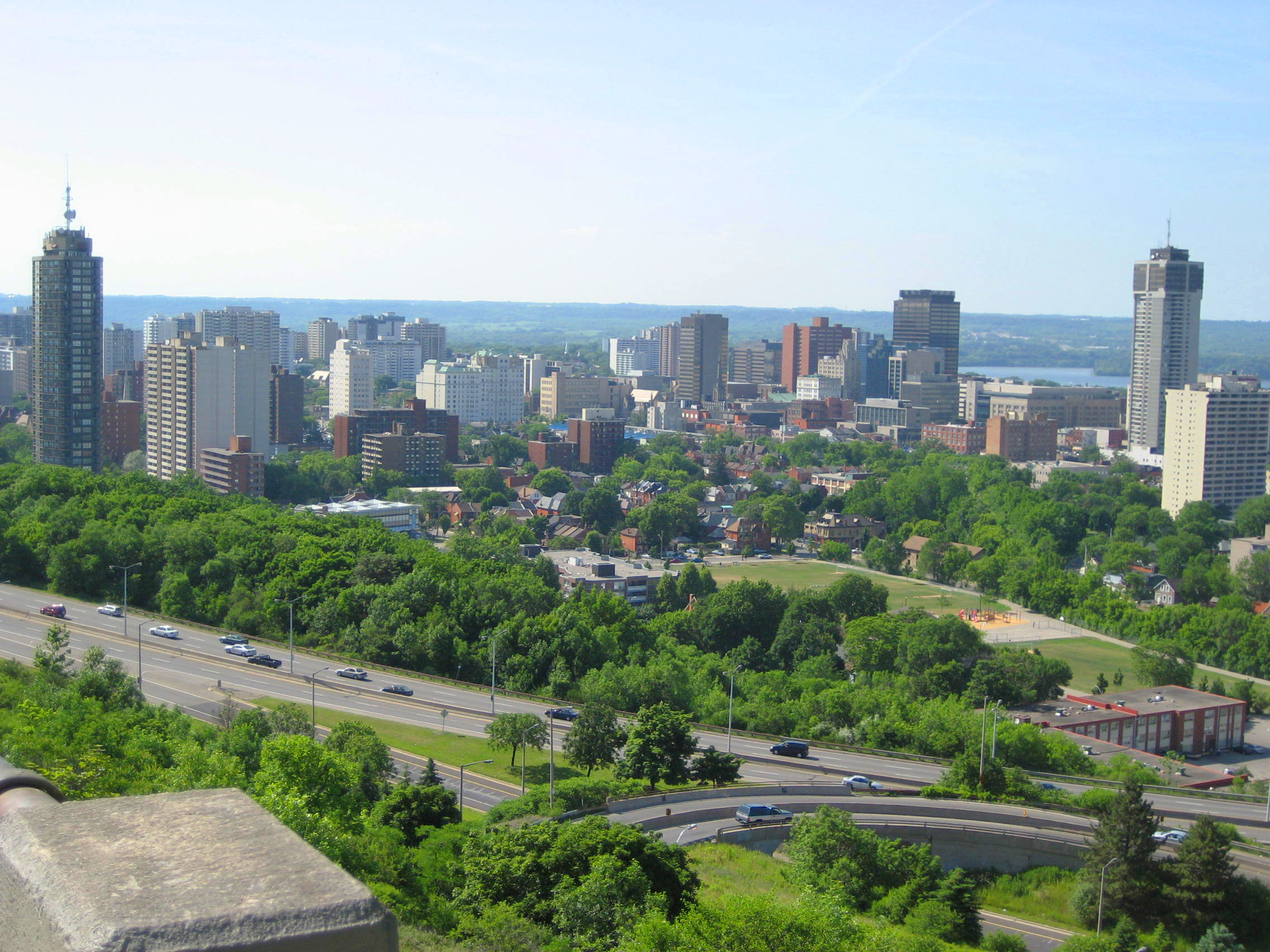
Skyline of downtown Hamilton

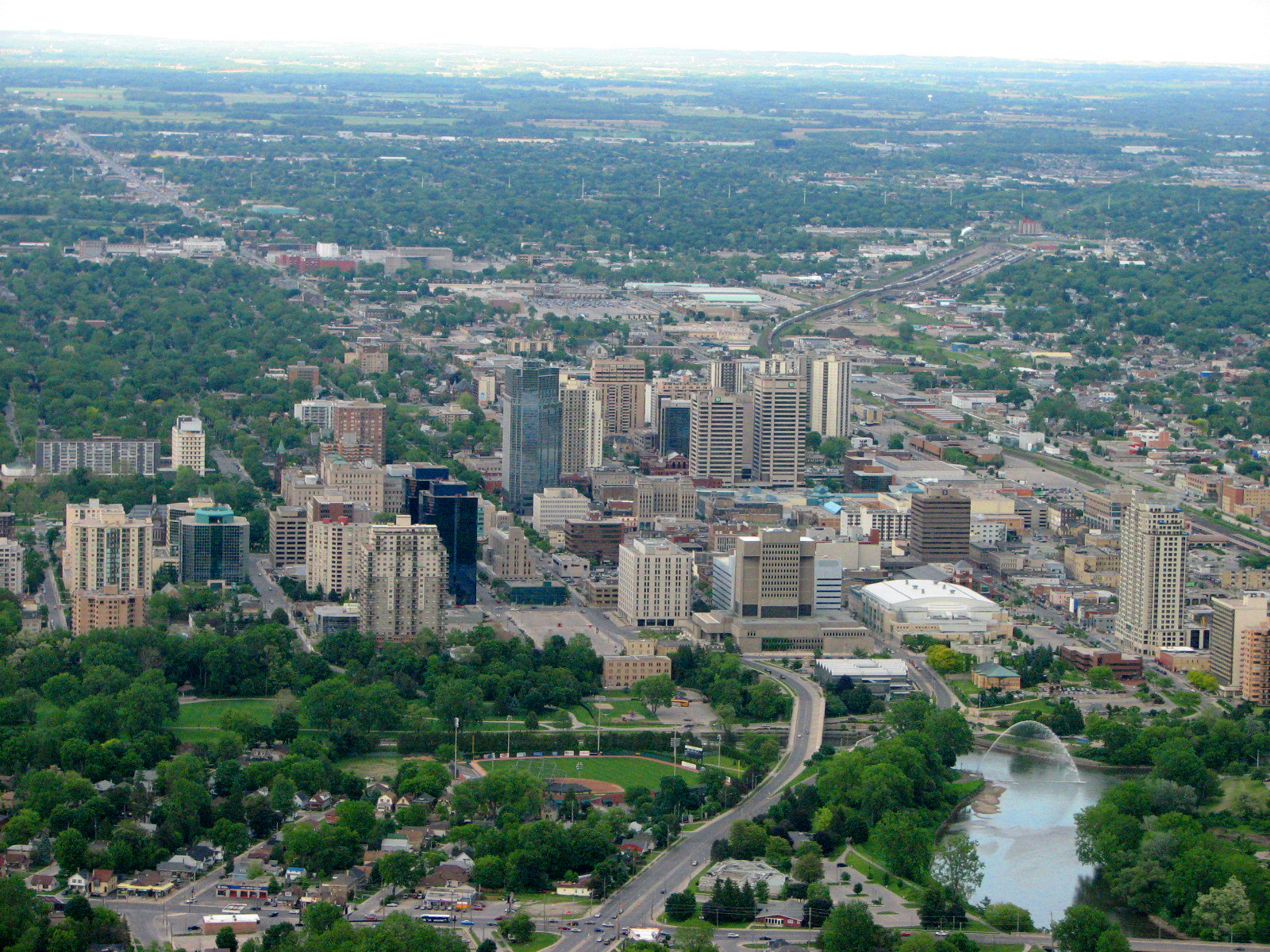
Skyline of downtown London

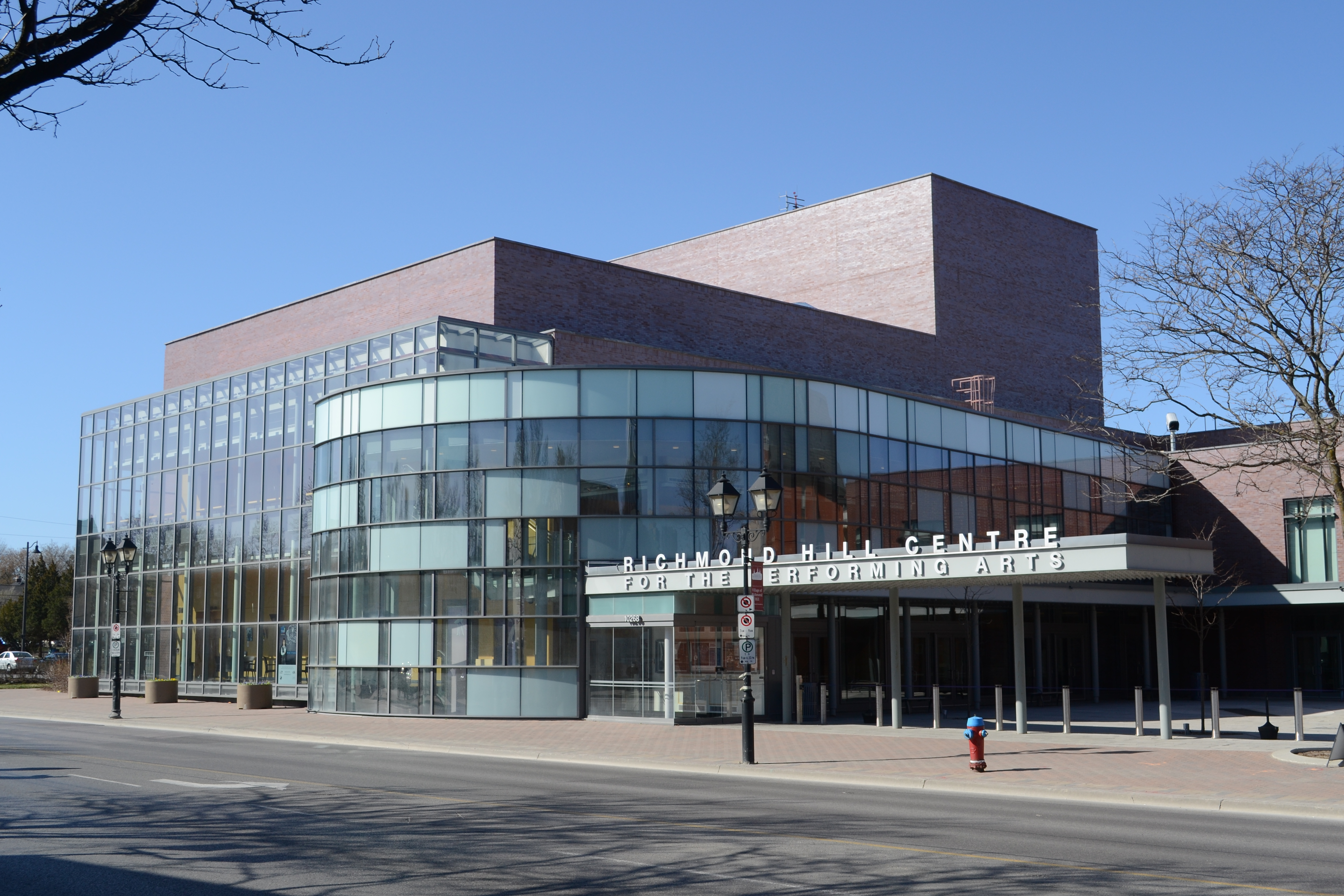
Richmond Hill Centre for the Performing Arts in Richmond Hill, Ontario's newest city

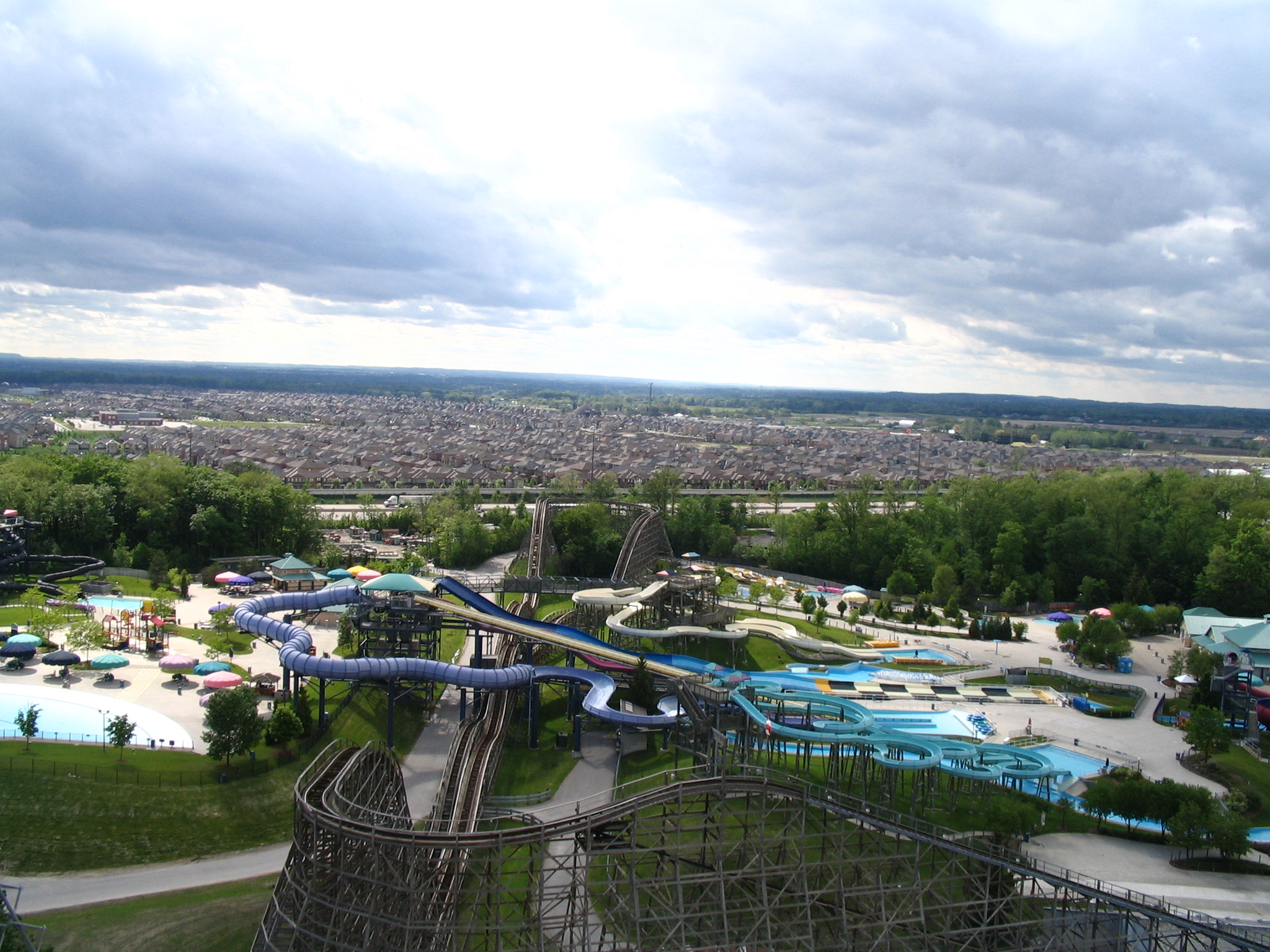
Vaughan as viewed from Canada's Wonderland

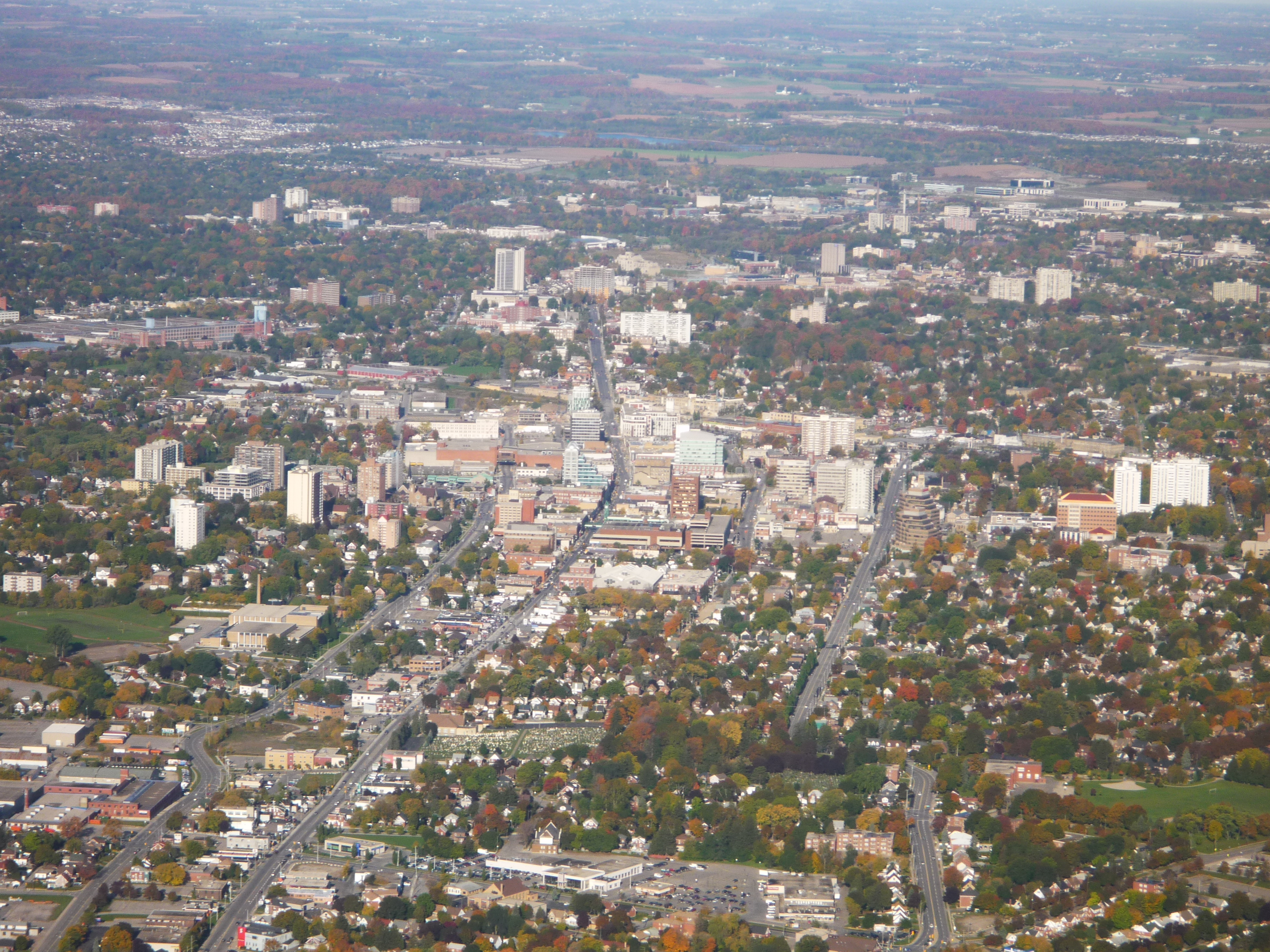
Downtown Kitchener

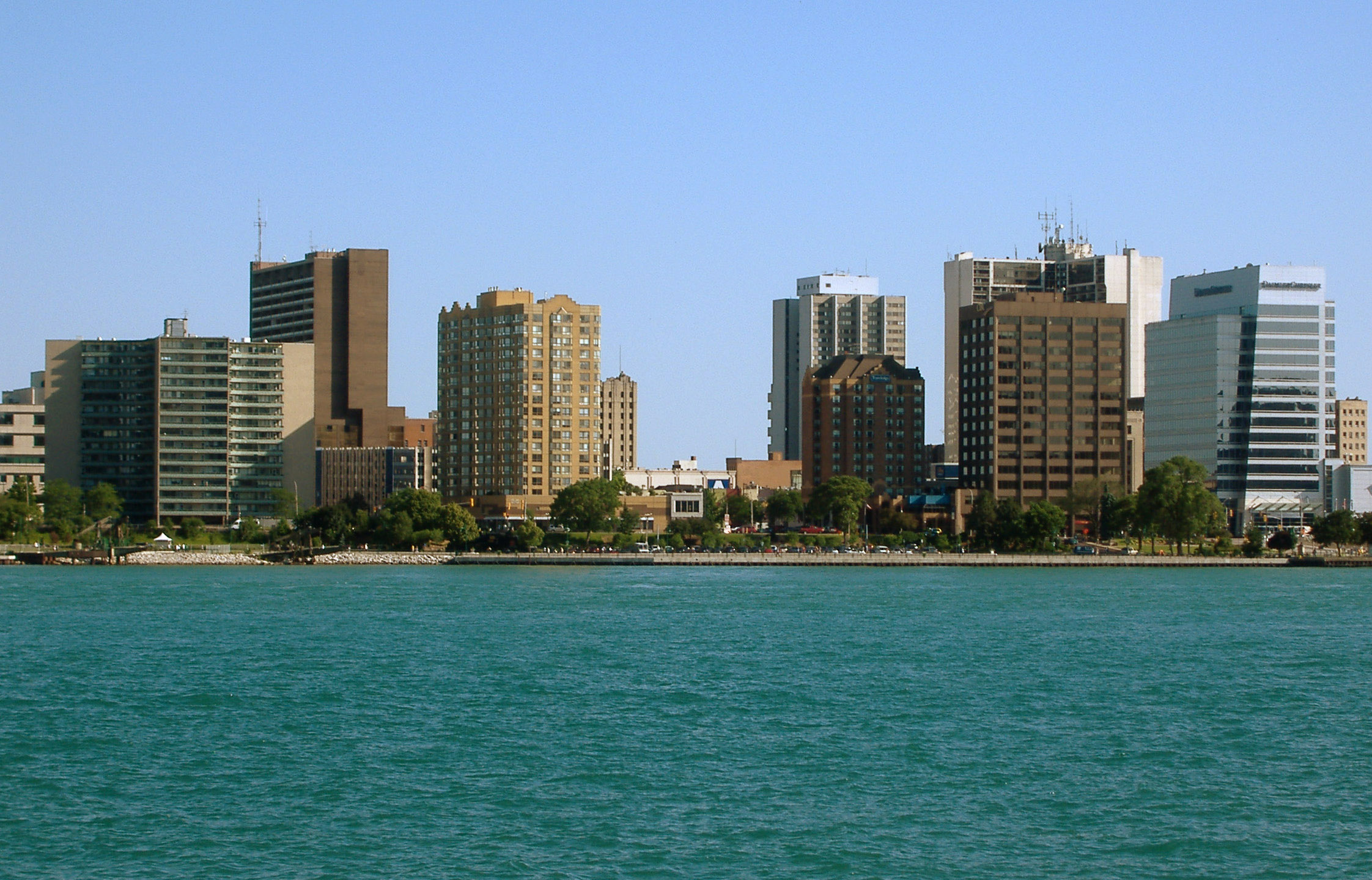
Downtown Windsor

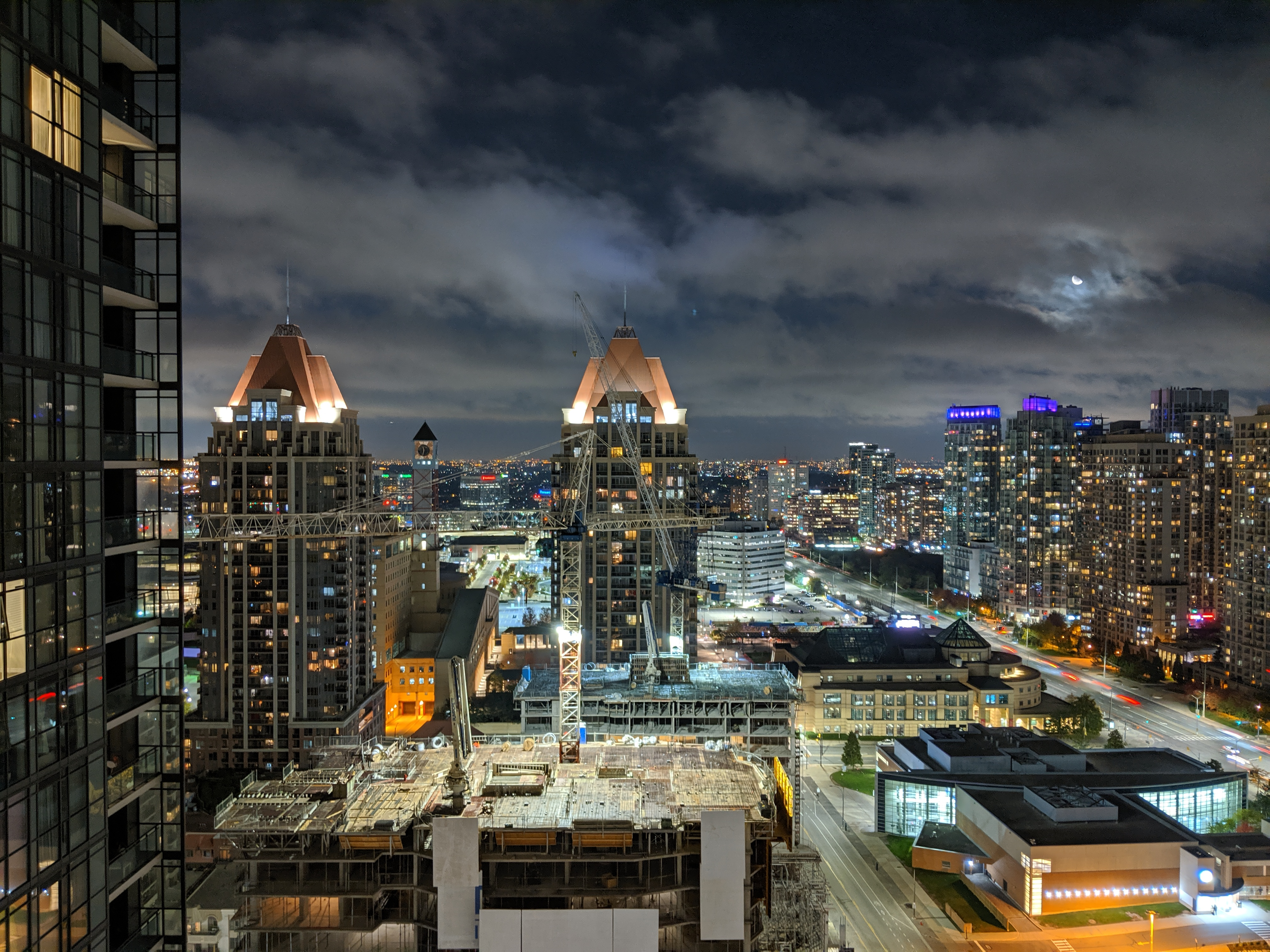
Downtown Mississauga

Name	Municipal status	Census division	Population (2021)	Population (2016)	Change (%)	Area (km^{2})	Population density
Barrie (Note: The Barrie census metropolitan area (CMA) is formed around the City of Barrie.)	Single-tier	Simcoe	147,829	141,434	+4.5%	99.01	1,493.1
Belleville	Single-tier	Hastings	55,071	50,716	+8.6%	247.15	222.8
Brampton	Lower-tier	Peel	656,480	593,638	+10.6%	265.89	2,469.0
Brant	Single-tier	Brant	39,474	35,640	+10.8%	817.66	48.3
Brantford (Note: The Brantford CMA includes the City of Brantford as well as the County of Brant, which is a single-tier city.)	Single-tier	Brant	104,688	98,563	+6.2%	98.65	1,061.2
Brockville	Single-tier	Leeds and Grenville	22,116	21,569	+2.5%	20.91	1,057.7
Burlington	Lower-tier	Halton	186,948	183,314	+2.0%	186.12	1,004.4
Cambridge (Note: The City of Cambridge, as well as the cities of Kitchener and Waterloo, form parts of the Kitchener–Cambridge–Waterloo CMA.)	Lower-tier	Waterloo	138,479	129,920	+6.6%	112.99	1,225.6
Clarence-Rockland	Lower-tier	Prescott and Russell	26,505	24,512	+8.1%	297.47	89.1
Cornwall	Single-tier	Stormont, Dundas and Glengarry	47,845	46,589	+2.7%	61.50	778.0
Dryden (Note: Dryden is Ontario's smallest city by population.)	Single-tier	Kenora	7,388	7,749	−4.7%	65.58	112.7
Elliot Lake	Single-tier	Algoma	11,372	10,741	+5.9%	696.06	16.3
Greater Sudbury (Note: Greater Sudbury is Ontario's largest city by area. The Greater Sudbury CMA is formed around the City of Greater Sudbury.)	Single-tier	Sudbury	166,004	161,531	+2.8%	3,186.26	52.1
Guelph	Single-tier	Wellington	143,740	131,794	+9.1%	87.43	1,644.1
Haldimand County	Single-tier	Haldimand	49,216	45,608	+7.9%	1,250.45	39.4
Hamilton (Note: Hamilton is Canada's tenth-largest city. The Hamilton CMA includes the cities of Burlington and Hamilton.)	Single-tier	Hamilton	569,353	536,917	+6.0%	1,118.31	509.1
Kawartha Lakes	Single-tier	Kawartha Lakes	79,247	75,423	+5.1%	3,033.66	26.1
Kenora	Single-tier	Kenora	14,967	15,096	−0.9%	211.65	70.7
Kingston	Single-tier	Frontenac	132,485	123,798	+7.0%	451.58	293.4
Kitchener (Note: The City of Kitchener, as well as the cities of Cambridge and Waterloo, form parts of the Kitchener–Cambridge–Waterloo CMA.)	Lower-tier	Waterloo	256,885	233,222	+10.1%	136.81	1,877.7
London (Note: The London CMA includes the cities of London and St. Thomas.)	Single-tier	Middlesex	422,324	383,822	+10.0%	420.50	1,004.3
Markham	Lower-tier	York	338,503	328,966	+2.9%	210.93	1,604.8
Mississauga (Note: Mississauga is Ontario's largest lower-tier city.)	Lower-tier	Peel	717,961	721,599	−0.5%	292.74	2,452.6
Niagara Falls (Note: The City of Niagara Falls, as well as the cities of Port Colborne, St. Catharines, Thorold and Welland, form parts of the St. Catharines–Niagara CMA.)	Lower-tier	Niagara	94,415	88,071	+7.2%	210.25	449.1
Norfolk County	Single-tier	Norfolk	67,490	64,044	+5.4%	1,597.68	42.2
North Bay	Single-tier	Nipissing	52,662	51,553	+2.2%	315.53	166.9
Orillia	Single-tier	Simcoe	33,411	31,166	+7.2%	28.53	1,171.1
Oshawa (Note: The Oshawa CMA is formed around the City of Oshawa.)	Lower-tier	Durham	175,383	159,458	+10.0%	145.72	1,203.6
Ottawa (Note: Ottawa is Canada's capital and fourth-largest city. The Ontario portion of the Ottawa–Gatineau CMA includes the cities of Clarence-Rockland and Ottawa.)	Single-tier	Ottawa	1,017,449	934,243	+8.9%	2,788.20	364.9
Owen Sound	Lower-tier	Grey	21,612	21,341	+1.3%	24.21	892.7
Pembroke (Note: Pembroke is Ontario's smallest city by area.)	Single-tier	Renfrew	14,364	13,882	+3.5%	14.32	1,003.1
Peterborough (Note: The Peterborough CMA is formed around the City of Peterborough.)	Single-tier	Peterborough	83,651	81,032	+3.2%	64.76	1,291.7
Pickering	Lower-tier	Durham	99,186	91,771	+8.1%	231.10	429.2
Port Colborne	Lower-tier	Niagara	20,033	18,306	+9.4%	121.99	164.2
Prince Edward County	Single-tier	Prince Edward	25,704	24,735	+3.9%	1,052.61	24.4
Quinte West	Single-tier	Hastings	46,560	43,577	+6.8%	495.45	94.0
Richmond Hill (Note: Richmond Hill is Ontario's newest city, adopting the name on March 26, 2019.)	Lower-tier	York	202,022	195,022	+3.6%	100.79	2,004.4
Sarnia	Lower-tier	Lambton	72,047	71,594	+0.6%	163.90	439.6
Sault Ste. Marie	Single-tier	Algoma	72,051	73,368	−1.8%	221.99	324.6
St. Catharines (Note: The City of St. Catharines, as well as the cities of Niagara Falls, Port Colborne, Thorold and Welland, form parts of the St. Catharines–Niagara CMA.)	Lower-tier	Niagara	136,803	133,113	+2.8%	96.20	1,422.1
St. Thomas	Single-tier	Elgin	42,840	38,909	+10.1%	35.61	1,203.0
Stratford	Single-tier	Perth	33,232	31,470	+5.6%	30.02	1,107.0
Temiskaming Shores	Single-tier	Timiskaming	9,634	9,920	−2.9%	176.67	54.5
Thorold	Lower-tier	Niagara	23,816	18,801	+26.7%	83.29	285.9
Thunder Bay (Note: The Thunder Bay CMA is formed around the City of Thunder Bay.)	Single-tier	Thunder Bay	108,843	107,909	+0.9%	327.77	332.1
Timmins	Single-tier	Cochrane	41,145	41,788	−1.5%	2,955.33	13.9
Toronto (Note: Toronto is Ontario's capital and Canada's and Ontario's largest city by population. The Toronto CMA includes the cities of Brampton, Markham, Mississauga, Pickering, Richmond Hill, Toronto and Vaughan.)	Single-tier	Toronto	2,794,356	2,731,571	+2.3%	631.10	4,427.8
Vaughan	Lower-tier	York	323,103	306,233	+5.5%	272.44	1,186.0
Waterloo (Note: The City of Waterloo, as well as the cities of Cambridge and Kitchener, form parts of the Kitchener–Cambridge–Waterloo CMA.)	Lower-tier	Waterloo	121,436	104,986	+15.7%	64.06	1,895.7
Welland	Lower-tier	Niagara	55,750	52,293	+6.6%	81.16	686.9
Windsor (Note: The Windsor CMA is formed around the City of Windsor.)	Single-tier	Essex	229,660	217,188	+5.7%	146.02	1,572.8
Woodstock	Lower-tier	Oxford	46,705	41,098	+13.6%	56.46	827.2
Total cities	—	—	10,400,243	9,900,603	+5.0%	25,902.47	401.5
Total lower-tier cities	—	—	3,714,072	3,517,258	+5.6%	3,154.52	1,177.4
Total single-tier cities	—	—	6,686,171	6,383,345	+4.7%	22,747.95	293.9

== See also ==
- List of communities in Ontario
- List of municipalities in Ontario
- List of towns in Ontario
- List of township municipalities in Ontario
- List of villages in Ontario
