= List of towns in Ontario =

A town is a sub-type of municipalities in the Canadian province of Ontario. A town can have the municipal status of either a single-tier or lower-tier municipality.

Ontario has 88 towns that had a cumulative population of 1,986,937 and an average population of 22,579 in the 2021 Census. In the 2021 Census, Ontario's largest and smallest towns are Oakville and Latchford with populations of 213,759 and 355 respectively.

== History ==
Under the former Municipal Act, 1990, a town was both an urban and a local municipality. Under this former legislation, a locality with a population of 2,000 or more could have been incorporated as a town by Ontario's Municipal Board upon review of an application from 75 or more residents of the locality. It also allowed the Municipal Board to change the status of a village or township to a town if it had a population of 2,000 upon review of an application from the village or township.

In the transition to the Municipal Act, 2001, these requirements were abandoned and, as at December 31, 2002, every town that:

- "existed and formed part of a county, a regional or district municipality or the County of Oxford for municipal purposes" became a lower-tier municipality yet retained its name as a town; and
- "existed and did not form part of a county, a regional or district municipality or the County of Oxford for municipal purposes" became a single-tier municipality yet retained its name as a town.

The current legislation also provides lower and single-tier municipalities with the authority to name themselves as "towns", or other former municipal status types such as "cities", "villages" or "townships", or generically as "municipalities".

== Towns in Ontario ==
Name	Municipal status	Geographic area	Population (2021)	Population (2016)	Change (%)	Area (km^{2})	Population density
Ajax	Lower-tier	Durham	126,666	119,677	5.8	66.64	1,900.6
Amherstburg	Lower-tier	Essex	23,524	21,936	7.2	183.76	128.0
Arnprior	Lower-tier	Renfrew	9,629	8,795	9.5	13.04	738.5
Atikokan	Single-tier	Rainy River	2,642	2,753	−4.0	313.64	8.4
Aurora	Lower-tier	York	62,057	55,445	11.9	50.00	1,241.1
Aylmer	Lower-tier	Elgin	7,699	7,492	2.8	6.37	1,208.6
Bancroft	Lower-tier	Hastings	4,065	3,881	4.7	227.54	17.9
Blind River	Single-tier	Algoma	3,422	3,472	−1.4	513.98	6.7
Bracebridge	Lower-tier	Muskoka	17,305	16,010	8.1	615.20	28.1
Bradford West Gwillimbury	Lower-tier	Simcoe	42,880	35,325	21.4	200.68	213.7
Bruce Mines	Single-tier	Algoma	582	582	0.0	6.09	95.6
Caledon	Lower-tier	Peel	76,581	66,502	15.2	688.82	111.2
Carleton Place	Lower-tier	Lanark	12,517	10,644	17.6	9.94	1,259.4
Cobalt	Single-tier	Timiskaming	989	1,128	−12.3	2.07	478.5
Cobourg	Lower-tier	Northumberland	20,519	19,440	5.6	22.41	915.7
Cochrane	Single-tier	Cochrane	5,390	5,321	1.3	537.90	10.0
Collingwood	Lower-tier	Simcoe	24,811	21,793	13.8	33.15	748.3
Deep River	Lower-tier	Renfrew	4,175	4,109	1.6	50.27	83.0
Deseronto	Lower-tier	Hastings	1,747	1,774	−1.5	2.52	693.5
East Gwillimbury	Lower-tier	York	34,637	23,991	44.4	244.91	141.4
Englehart	Single-tier	Timiskaming	1,442	1,479	−2.5	2.92	494.2
Erin	Lower-tier	Wellington	11,981	11,439	4.7	298.81	40.1
Espanola	Single-tier	Sudbury	5,185	5,048	2.7	81.00	64.0
Essex	Lower-tier	Essex	21,216	20,427	3.9	277.53	76.4
Fort Erie	Lower-tier	Niagara	32,901	30,710	7.1	166.24	197.9
Fort Frances	Single-tier	Rainy River	7,466	7,739	−3.5	25.55	292.2
Gananoque	Single-tier	Leeds and Grenville	5,383	5,159	4.3	7.01	768.4
Georgina	Lower-tier	York	47,642	45,418	4.9	287.69	165.6
Goderich	Lower-tier	Huron	7,881	7,628	3.3	8.54	923.1
Gore Bay	Single-tier	Manitoulin	808	867	−6.8	5.14	157.2
Grand Valley	Lower-tier	Dufferin	3,851	2,956	30.3	158.60	24.3
Gravenhurst	Lower-tier	Muskoka	13,157	12,311	6.9	489.11	26.9
Greater Napanee	Lower-tier	Lennox and Addington	16,879	15,892	6.2	462.30	36.5
Grimsby	Lower-tier	Niagara	28,883	27,314	5.7	68.71	420.4
Halton Hills	Lower-tier	Halton	62,951	61,161	2.9	276.81	227.4
Hanover	Lower-tier	Grey	7,967	7,688	3.6	9.78	814.6
Hawkesbury	Lower-tier	Prescott and Russell	10,194	10,263	−0.7	10.10	1,009.7
Hearst	Single-tier	Cochrane	4,794	5,070	−5.4	98.06	48.9
Huntsville	Lower-tier	Muskoka	21,147	19,816	6.7	705.18	30.0
Ingersoll	Lower-tier	Oxford	13,693	12,757	7.3	12.73	1,075.3
Innisfil	Lower-tier	Simcoe	43,326	36,566	18.5	262.39	165.1
Iroquois Falls	Single-tier	Cochrane	4,418	4,537	−2.6	599.03	7.4
Kapuskasing	Single-tier	Cochrane	8,057	8,292	−2.8	83.98	95.9
Kearney	Single-tier	Parry Sound	974	882	10.4	528.21	1.8
Kingsville	Lower-tier	Essex	22,119	21,552	2.6	246.08	89.9
Kirkland Lake	Single-tier	Timiskaming	7,750	7,981	−2.9	261.29	29.7
Lakeshore	Lower-tier	Essex	40,410	36,611	10.4	529.00	76.4
LaSalle	Lower-tier	Essex	32,721	30,180	8.4	64.96	503.7
Latchford	Single-tier	Timiskaming	355	313	13.4	152.26	2.3
Laurentian Hills	Lower-tier	Renfrew	2,885	2,961	−2.6	634.31	4.5
Lincoln	Lower-tier	Niagara	25,719	23,787	8.1	162.74	158.0
Marathon	Single-tier	Thunder Bay	3,138	3,273	−4.1	167.03	18.8
Mattawa	Single-tier	Nipissing	1,881	1,993	−5.6	3.67	513.1
Midland	Lower-tier	Simcoe	17,817	16,864	5.7	35.33	504.3
Milton	Lower-tier	Halton	132,979	110,128	20.7	363.83	365.5
Minto	Lower-tier	Wellington	9,094	8,671	4.9	300.19	30.3
Mississippi Mills	Lower-tier	Lanark	14,740	13,163	12.0	511.25	28.8
Mono	Lower-tier	Dufferin	9,421	8,609	9.4	278.37	33.8
Moosonee	Single-tier	Cochrane	1,512	1,481	2.1	547.83	2.8
New Tecumseth	Lower-tier	Simcoe	43,948	34,242	28.3	273.87	160.5
Newmarket	Lower-tier	York	87,942	84,224	4.4	38.50	2,284.1
Niagara-on-the-Lake	Lower-tier	Niagara	19,088	17,511	9.0	131.35	145.3
Oakville	Lower-tier	Halton	213,759	193,832	10.3	138.94	1,538.5
Orangeville	Lower-tier	Dufferin	30,167	28,900	4.4	15.16	1,989.5
Parry Sound	Single-tier	Parry Sound	6,879	6,408	7.4	13.10	524.9
Pelham	Lower-tier	Niagara	18,192	17,110	6.3	126.35	144.0
Penetanguishene	Lower-tier	Simcoe	10,077	8,962	12.4	25.42	396.4
Perth	Lower-tier	Lanark	6,469	5,930	9.1	12.21	529.8
Petawawa	Lower-tier	Renfrew	18,160	17,187	5.7	164.70	110.3
Petrolia	Lower-tier	Lambton	6,013	5,742	4.7	12.46	482.6
Plympton-Wyoming	Lower-tier	Lambton	8,308	7,795	6.6	318.86	26.1
Prescott	Single-tier	Leeds and Grenville	4,078	4,222	−3.4	4.94	826.0
Rainy River	Single-tier	Rainy River	752	807	−6.8	3.12	241.4
Renfrew	Lower-tier	Renfrew	8,190	8,223	−0.4	12.81	639.3
Saugeen Shores	Lower-tier	Bruce	15,908	13,715	16.0	170.19	93.5
Shelburne	Lower-tier	Dufferin	8,994	8,126	10.7	6.56	1,370.8
Smiths Falls	Single-tier	Lanark	9,254	8,780	5.4	9.66	958.1
Smooth Rock Falls	Single-tier	Cochrane	1,200	1,330	−9.8	199.73	6.0
South Bruce Peninsula	Lower-tier	Bruce	9,137	8,416	8.6	530.61	17.2
Spanish	Single-tier	Algoma	670	712	−5.9	106.90	6.3
St. Marys	Single-tier	Perth	7,386	7,265	1.7	12.44	593.8
Tecumseh	Lower-tier	Essex	23,300	23,229	0.3	94.59	246.3
The Blue Mountains	Lower-tier	Grey	9,390	7,025	33.7	284.65	33.0
Thessalon	Single-tier	Algoma	1,260	1,286	−2.0	4.38	287.5
Tillsonburg	Lower-tier	Oxford	18,615	15,872	17.3	22.20	838.6
Wasaga Beach	Lower-tier	Simcoe	24,862	20,675	20.3	57.42	433.0
Whitby	Lower-tier	Durham	138,501	128,377	7.9	146.69	944.1
Whitchurch-Stouffville	Lower-tier	York	49,864	45,837	8.8	206.42	241.6
Total towns			1,986,937	1,810,796	9.7	16,116.72	123.28
Total lower-tier towns			1,889,270	1,712,616	10.3	11,825.79	159.76
Total single-tier towns			97,667	98,180	-0.5	4,290.93	22.76

== See also ==
- List of cities in Ontario
- List of communities in Ontario
- List of municipalities in Ontario
- List of township municipalities in Ontario
- List of villages in Ontario
