= Herbert Stone MacDonald =

Canadian politician

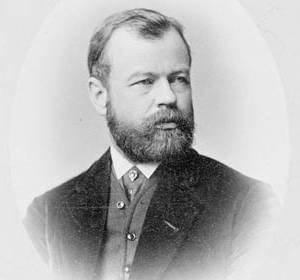
- MacDonald in 1873, in the Library and Archives Canada

Personal details
- Born: February 23, 1842; Gananoque
- Died: January 8, 1921

Herbert Stone MacDonald (February 23, 1842 – January 8, 1921) was an Ontario lawyer, judge and political figure. He represented Leeds South in the Legislative Assembly of Ontario as a Conservative member from 1871 to 1873.

== Biography ==
He was born in Gananoque on February 23, 1842, and attended Queen's University. He studied law, first articling with Albert Norton Richards, was called to the bar in 1863 and practiced law in Brockville. In 1864, he married Emma Matilda, the daughter of David Jones. He was a lieutenant in the local militia. MacDonald was a member of the Orange Order, serving as grand master for Ontario East. He introduced a bill in 1873 to incorporate the Orange Order, which was passed in the legislature but the Lieutenant Governor, William Pearce Howland, held the bill for consideration by the federal parliament and it was replaced by a later more general bill in 1874. In October 1873, MacDonald resigned his seat in the legislative assembly to become junior judge in the county court for Leeds and Grenville. In 1878, he was named senior judge in the county court. He served on the council for Trinity College, Toronto and as director for Bishop Ridley College and the Brockville General Hospital.

== Electoral history ==
1871 Ontario general election: Leeds South
Party	Candidate	Votes
Conservative	Herbert Stone MacDonald	Acclaimed
Source: Elections Ontario
