= Harry Falconer McLean =

Harry Falconer McLean (18 February 1881 - April 1961) was a Canadian railway contractor and eccentric philanthropist. He played a leading role in the construction of much of the trans-Canadian railways. He was well known for giving away large sums of money to people he had just met, and even throwing bills from hotel windows.

== Early life ==
McLean was born in North Dakota, the son of Canadian parents. He studied at the North Dakota Business School in Fargo.

== Dominion Atlantic Railway ==
McLean began work on the railways as a water boy for the Winston Brothers, and over the years moved up the ranks, eventually becoming president of the Dominion Atlantic Railway company.

== Philanthropy ==
McLean frequently handed out cash or cheques to people he encountered, including hotel staff and taxi drivers. He made many other private, anonymous donations, which led to him being known as Mr X until his identity was revealed, without his consent.

== Personal life ==
McLean lived in Merrickville, Ontario, on the Rideau Canal. He was first married to Irene Robertson. His second wife was Margaret K. Fitzpatrick, known as Rita, to whom he was married until his death. In 1939, he became the first to land his Stinson SR-9F Reliant (CF-BGJ) plane at Toronto City Airport.

== Legacy ==
The Harry MacLean's Pub, Baldachin Inn in Merrickville, Ontario now bears his name, in addition to an H. F. McLean Road.

== Bibliography ==
- Charland, Theresa (2007). Building an Empire: "Big Pants" Harry F. McLean and his Sons of Martha, Ontario: Riparian House
- Finnigan, Joan Giants of Canada's Ottawa Valley, Ontario: General Store Publishing House
- Barnes, Michael (1995) Great Northern Characters, Ontario: General Store Publishing House
