= Merrickville–Wolford =

Village in Ontario, Canada

Merrickville-Wolford
- Village (lower-tier)
- Village of Merrickville-Wolford
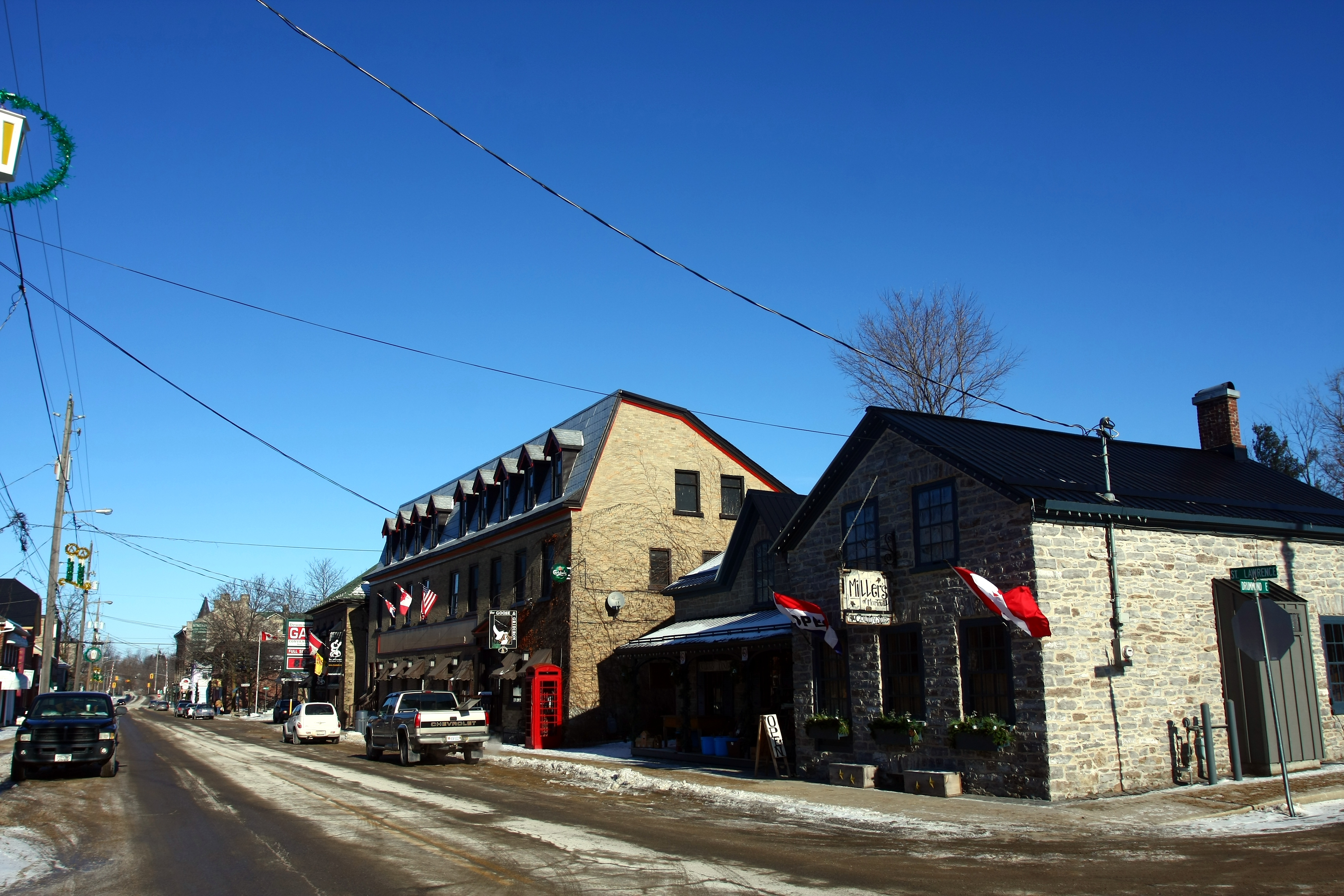
- Merrickville
- Motto: Jewel of the Rideau
- Location within United Counties of Leeds and Grenville Location within Southern Ontario
- Coordinates: 44°55′N 75°50′W
- Country: Canada
- Province: Ontario
- County: Leeds and Grenville
- Settled: 1794
- Incorporated: January 1, 1998

Government
  - Mayor: Anne Barr
  - Governing Body: Council of the Village of Merrickville-Wolford
  - Fed. riding: Leeds—Grenville—Thousand Islands and Rideau Lakes
  - Prov. riding: Leeds—Grenville—Thousand Islands and Rideau Lakes

Area
  - Land: 214.33 km^{2} (82.75 sq mi)

Population (2021)
  - Total: 3,135
  - Density: 14.6/km^{2} (38/sq mi)
- Time zone: UTC−05:00 (EST)
  - Summer (DST): UTC−04:00 (EDT)
- Area code: 613
- Website: www.merrickville-wolford.ca

Merrickville–Wolford is a village-status municipality in Eastern Ontario, Canada, located in the United Counties of Leeds and Grenville. It spans both shores of the Rideau River.

The current municipality was incorporated on January 1, 1998, by amalgamating the former Village of Merrickville with the former Township of Wolford.

In the last two decades, the region has seen a boom in the local economy mostly related to increased tourism. It is famous for its local crafts people and artists. The Rideau Canal locks at Merrickville with three locks have a total lift of 25 ft (7.6 m). On the south side of the locks there is the old blockhouse, which has been restored by Parks Canada as a tourist site and museum operated by the Merrickville and District Historical Society.

== History ==
William Merrick, a United Empire Loyalist settler originally from Springfield, Massachusetts, founded the village of Merrickville in 1794. Attracted to the site by waterpower, he constructed a dam across the river and then built grist, saw and carding mills. It was not long before a community sprang up around the milling activity. In 1821, Merrick built a stone house overlooking his mills.

When the construction crews arrived in 1827 to build the Rideau Canal, the village of Merrick's Mills, as it was then known, was a thriving community of about 300. A plaque was erected by the Merrickville and District Historical Society in remembrance of an unknown number of persons who were buried in the McGuigan Cemetery between the years 1800 and 1900; Many died of pestilence, principally malaria, during the construction of the Rideau Canal.

Unlike most of the pre-canal sites, Merrick's Mills was not displaced or overshadowed by canal construction. After the canal was completed, the excess water once again turned the wheels of the mills and the improved transportation system caused a surge in commercial activity in the village. By 1851, Merrick's Mills was an impressive industrial centre.

Merrick's Mills continued to thrive into the mid-1860s. The end of the community's industrial growth is closely related to the decline of the commercial phase of the Rideau canal. The rise of the nearby town of Smiths Falls as a major railway hub displaced Merrick's Mills as an industrial leader in the region. Despite the decline, some industry continued in the community. In 1915 a power company was formed at Merrickville to provide electricity for the mills and a foundry, and the woolen mill continued to function until 1954.

On October 26 2026 Merrickville-Wolford elected its first all female council.

== Communities ==
In addition to Merrickville, the village comprises the smaller communities of Carleys Corners, Eastons Corners, Hemlock Corners, Jasper, Snowdons Corners, Wolford Centre, Wolford Chapel and Yule.

The village administrative offices are located in Merrickville.

== Demographics ==
In the 2021 Census of Population conducted by Statistics Canada, Merrickville–Wolford had a population of 3,135 living in 1,290 of its 1,392 total private dwellings, a change of 2.2% from its 2016 population of 3,067. With a land area of 214.33 km^{2} (82.75 sq mi), it had a population density of 14.6/km^{2} (37.9/sq mi) in 2021.

Canada census – Merrickville-Wolford community profile

	2021	2016	2011
Population	3,135 (+2.2% from 2016)	3067 (+7.6% from 2011)	2850 (-0.6% from 2006)
Land area	214.33 km^{2} (82.75 sq mi)	214.55 km^{2} (82.84 sq mi)	214.49 km^{2} (82.82 sq mi)
Population density	14.6/km^{2} (38/sq mi)	14.3/km^{2} (37/sq mi)	13.3/km^{2} (34/sq mi)
Median age	54.4 (M: 53.2, F: 55.6)	51.6 (M: 51.0, F: 51.9)
Private dwellings	1,392 (total) 1,290 (occupied)	1344 (total)	1248 (total)
Median household income	$89,000	$72192

References: 2021 2016 2011

Historical census populations – Merrickville–Wolford
Year	Pop.	±%
2001	2,812	—
2006	2,867	+2.0%
2011	2,850	−0.6%
2016	3,067	+7.6%
2021	3,135	+2.2%
Source: Statistics Canada

- Population in 1996:
  - Merrickville Village: 1,027
  - Wolford Township: 1,603
- Population in 1991:
  - Merrickville Village: 989
  - Wolford Township: 1,438

Mother tongue (2021):

- English as first language: 88.4%
- French as first language: 5.5%
- English and French as first language: 1.3%
- Other as first language: 3.8%

== Attractions ==
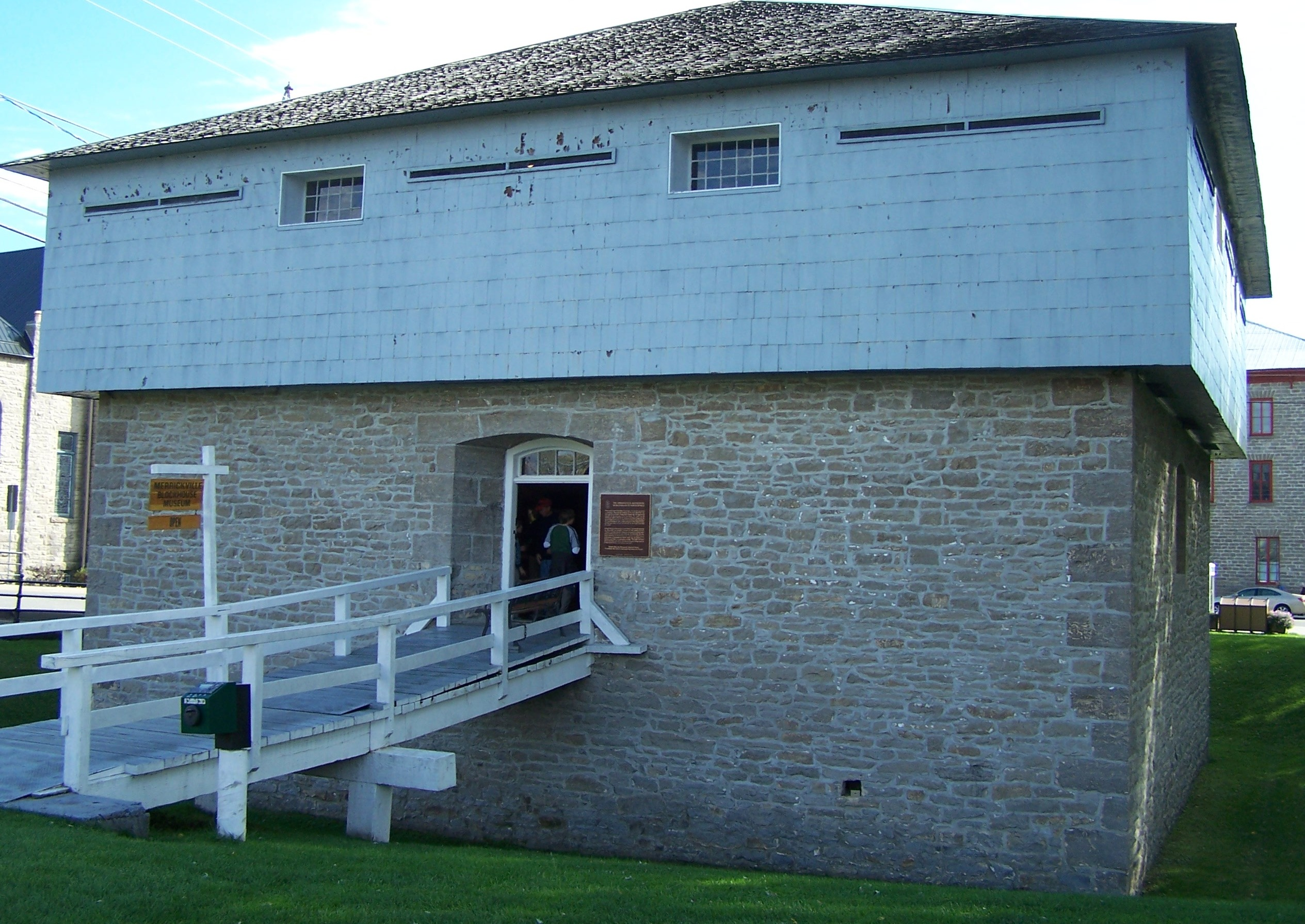
Blockhouse on the Rideau Canal

Merrickville has more than 100 historic and heritage properties. One of the oldest settlements along the Rideau canal, a major feature in the village is the set of three locks on the Rideau Canal. The locks are adjacent to the Blockhouse, built in 1832 to guard the locks against potential American attacks.

The Blockhouse, a National Historic Site of Canada, was built by Lieutenant-Colonel John By as part of a chain of four blockhouses for the defense of the Rideau Canal. The Blockhouse Museum is open during peak summer season. Near the locks is the Industrial Heritage Complex Museum, the site of the original mills.

Merrickville was for many years the home of railway contractor Harry Falconer McLean, and his house built by Aaron Merrick, the son of town founder William Merrick, can still be seen in the village. A pub is now named after Harry McLean, although it is not located in his house.

The Merrickville Artists Guild Studio Tour, the last weekend of September and first weekend in October, is Eastern Ontario's original artists' tour, and features the work of over 30 artists each year.

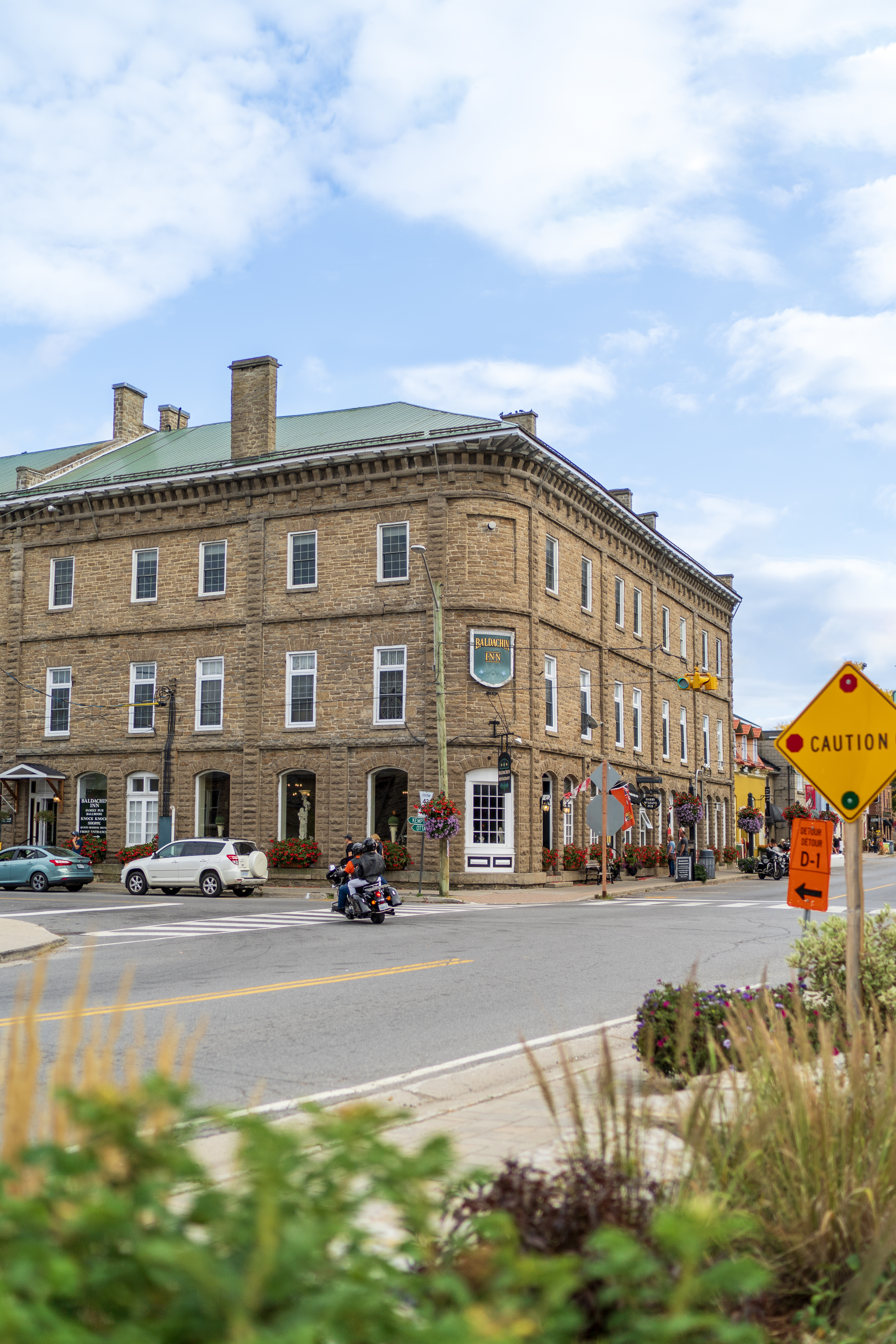
Baldachin Inn, St. Lawrence Street

Every summer there is the Merrickville Fair which brings a midway, 4-H Livestock Show events, agricultural displays and other attractions to the town. In July there is also a Vintage Car Show that brings exhibitors from central and eastern Canada and the United States.

The Baldachin Inn, constructed in 1860, was historically significant as the largest department store between Chicago and Montreal. The building was commissioned by Harry MacLean. The building's ballroom features a distinctive architectural element known as the King's Post Truss system. This structural design enables a column-free interior space. The resulting 6,000-square-foot (557 m²) ballroom provides an unobstructed venue frequently utilized for celebrations and social gatherings.

There are a number of bed and breakfast locations at Merrickville, and restaurants including pubs, cafés, and diners.

The Rideau Trail passes through the village.

== See also ==
- List of francophone communities in Ontario
- List of townships in Ontario
