= Robert Henry Preston =

Canadian politician (1840–1926)

Ontario MPP
- In office 1886–1894
- Preceded by: New riding
- Succeeded by: Walter Beatty
- Constituency: Leeds

Personal details
- Born: March 15, 1840 Bastard Township, Leeds County, Upper Canada
- Died: December 18, 1926 (aged 86)
- Party: Conservative
- Spouse: Elizabeth Tett (m. 1868)
- Occupation: Doctor

Robert Henry Preston (March 15, 1840 - December 18, 1926) was an Ontario doctor and political figure. He represented Leeds South from 1875 to 1879 and from 1883 to 1886 and Leeds from 1886 to 1894 in the Legislative Assembly of Ontario as a Conservative member.

He was born in Bastard Township, Leeds County in 1840, the son of Anthony Preston, a farmer who came to Upper Canada from Ireland. His younger brother Richard Franklin Preston was also a physician and politician. In 1862, he received an M.D. from Ann Arbor Medical College in Michigan; he went on to study at Bellvue College in New York City and Queen's College and received his license to practice medicine in 1864, setting up practice in Newboro. In 1868, he was named associate coroner for the United Counties of Leeds and Grenville. Preston was president of the Brockville, Westport and Sault Ste. Marie Railway. He married Elizabeth, the daughter of Benjamin Tett, in 1868. He served as president of the North Crosby and Newboro Agricultural Association. Preston was also a member of the Freemasons.

== Electoral history ==
1875 Ontario general election: Leeds South
Party	Candidate	Votes	%
Conservative	Robert Henry Preston	1,481	58.70
Liberal	R. Fields	1,042	41.30
Turnout		2,523	79.87
Eligible voters		3,159	
Conservative hold			
Source: Elections Ontario
