= Charles MacOdrum =

Canadian politician from Ontario (died 1954)

Charles Gordon MacOdrum (died March 15, 1954) was a politician in Ontario, Canada. He was the Progressive Conservative member of the Legislative Assembly of Ontario for Leeds from 1951 to his death in 1954.

== See also ==
- 24th Parliament of Ontario
