= Lloyd Letherby =

Canadian politician

Ontario MPP
- In office 1954–1967
- Preceded by: John Duncan McPhee
- Succeeded by: Gordon Elsworth Smith
- Constituency: Simcoe East

Personal details
- Born: July 27, 1900 Midland, Ontario
- Died: January 4, 1968 (aged 67) Orillia, Ontario
- Party: Progressive Conservative
- Spouse: Kathleen Lovering (1900-1973)
- Children: Jack Letherby (1933-1979)

Lloyd Averall Letherby (July 27, 1900 – January 4, 1968) was a politician in Ontario, Canada. He was a Progressive Conservative member of the Legislative Assembly of Ontario from 1954 to 1967 who represented the central Ontario riding of Simcoe East.

== Background ==
Letherby was born in Midland, Ontario. He went to school there and graduated from high school. After school he worked in a number of occupations including travelling salesman, grocery store owner, newspaper editor and insurance and real estate broker. He lived in Coldwater, Ontario where he and his wife raised one son.

== Politics ==
In 1935 he was elected reeve of Coldwater, Ontario. He stayed in that role until 1954 when he was elected in a by-election called to fill the vacancy created by the death of the PC MPP, John Duncan McPhee. He defeated W.L. Moore (Liberal) and Wilfred Hoult (CCF) to win the riding. He was re-elected in 1955, 1959 and 1963. He retired in 1967 citing poor health.

He died in Orillia at the Soldiers' Memorial Hospital after suffering a heart attack. He was buried in Coldwater.

== Electoral record ==
1940 Canadian federal election: Simcoe East
| Party | Candidate | Votes |
|---|---|---|
| Liberal | George McLean | 8,470 |
| National Government | Oliver Hereford Smith | 7,024 |
