= 2018 Peterborough County municipal elections =

Local election in Ontario, Canada

Elections were held in Peterborough County, Ontario, on October 22, 2018, in conjunction with municipal elections across the province.

== Peterborough County Council ==
Peterborough County Council consists of two members from each of the county's constituent municipalities.

Position	Elected
Asphodel-Norwood Mayor	Rodger Bonneau
Asphodel-Norwood Deputy Mayor	Bernadette Vanderhorst
Cavan Monaghan Mayor	Scott McFadden
Cavan Monaghan Deputy Mayor	Matthew Graham
Douro-Dummer Mayor	J. Murray Jones (acclaimed)
Douro-Dummer Deputy Mayor	Karl Moher
Havelock-Belmont-Methuen Mayor	Jim Martin
Havelock-Belmont-Methuen Deputy Mayor	David Gerow
North Kawartha Mayor	Carolyn Amyotte
North Kawartha Deputy Mayor	Jim Whelan
Otonabee-South Monaghan Reeve	Joe Taylor (acclaimed)
Otonabee-South Monaghan Deputy Reeve	Bonnie Clark
Selwyn Mayor	Andy Mitchell
Selwyn Deputy Mayor	Sherry Senis (acclaimed)
Trent Lakes Mayor	Janet Clarkson
Trent Lakes Deputy Mayor	Ron Windover

== Asphodel-Norwood ==
Mayoral Candidate	Vote	%
Rodger Bonneau	1,039	60.34
Debbie Lynch	683	39.66

== Cavan Monaghan ==
Mayoral Candidate	Vote	%
Scott McFadden (X)	2,109	62.92
Jim Chaplin	1,243	37.08

== Douro-Dummer ==
Mayoral Candidate	Vote	%
J. Murray Jones (X)	Acclaimed	

== Havelock-Belmont-Methuen ==
Mayoral Candidate	Vote	%
Jim Martin	1,662	57.11
Andy Sharpe	1,248	42.89

== North Kawartha ==
Mayoral Candidate	Vote	%
Carolyn Amyotte	1,650	54.42
Rick Woodcock (X)	1,382	45.58

== Otonabee-South Monaghan ==
Mayoral Candidate	Vote	%
Joe Taylor	Acclaimed	

== Selwyn ==
Mayoral Candidate	Vote	%
Andy Mitchell	3,122	49.86
Ron Black	2,801	44.74
Linda Marlene Eales	338	5.40

== Trent Lakes ==
Mayoral Candidate	Vote	%
Janet Clarkson	2,109	53.79
Peter Raymond	1,812	46.21
