= James Irwin Hartt =

Ontario MPP
- In office 1911–1919
- Preceded by: James Brockett Tudhope
- Succeeded by: John Benjamin Johnston
- Constituency: Simcoe East

Personal details
- Born: March 2, 1866 Ireland
- Died: February 17, 1935 (aged 67) Orillia, Ontario
- Party: Conservative
- Spouse: Flora Elizabeth Carter (m. 1897)
- Occupation: Businessman

James Irwin Hartt (March 2, 1866 – February 17, 1935) was an Irish-born lumberman and political figure in Ontario. He represented Simcoe East in the Legislative Assembly of Ontario from 1911 to 1919 as a Conservative member.

The son of Isaac B. Hartt and Jane Irwin, he moved to Canada in 1884. In 1897, Hartt married Flora Carter. He ran unsuccessfully for a seat in the Ontario assembly in 1908. Hartt served on the municipal council for Orillia. He died at Orillia in 1935.
