= William Finlayson (Canadian politician) =

Canadian politician

Ontario MPP
- In office 1937–1939
- Preceded by: Garnet Edward Tanner
- Succeeded by: George Alexander Drew
- In office 1923–1934
- Preceded by: John Benjamin Johnston
- Succeeded by: Garnet Edward Tanner
- Constituency: Simcoe East

Personal details
- Born: December 12, 1874 Brantford, Ontario
- Died: November 14, 1943 (aged 68) Midland, Ontario
- Party: Conservative
- Spouse: Ethel Cora Sinclair (m. 1905)
- Occupation: Lawyer

Military service
- Branch/service: Canadian Field Artillery
- Years of service: 1916–1919
- Rank: Captain
- Unit: 10th Brigade
- Battles/wars: World War I

William Finlayson (December 12, 1874 – November 14, 1943) was an Ontario lawyer, cabinet minister and political figure.

== Early life ==
Born in Brantford, Ontario, he was the son of Alexander F. Finlayson and Annie Tupper, and was educated at Jarvis Collegiate Institute and Osgoode Hall Law School in Toronto, Ontario. He set up practice in Midland in 1897 in partnership with William Humphrey Bennett. In 1905, he married Ethel Cora Sinclair.

He was President of the Simcoe Railway and Power Company, which constructed the Big Chute hydroelectric plant in 1909. The plant was acquired by the Hydro-Electric Power Commission of Ontario in 1914, being the first station owned and operated by it.

Finlayson served in the Canadian Militia, eventually becoming a captain in the 35th Simcoe Foresters. During World War I, Finlayson enlisted in the 157th Battalion of the Canadian Expeditionary Force, and served in France as a captain in the 10th Brigade, Canadian Field Artillery.

Finlayson entered into a law practice in a partnership with George Dudley in 1917. They established at Finlayson & Dudley, Barristers and Solicitors at 212 King Street in Midland. Dudley took over the firm upon Finlayson's death.

== Political career ==
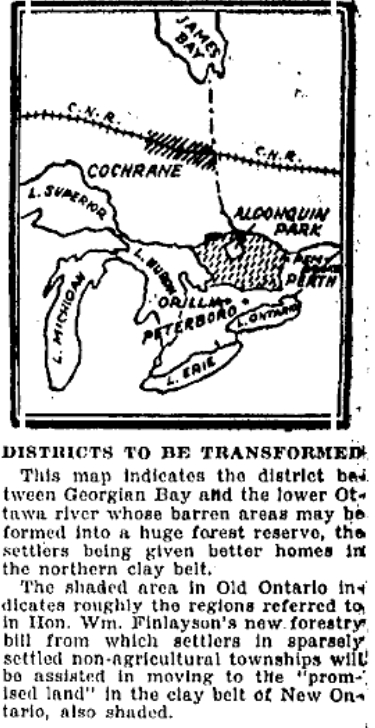
Graphic describing lands to be affected by The Forestry Act, 1927

Finlayson was mayor of Midland, Ontario from 1906 to 1907.

He represented Simcoe East in the Legislative Assembly of Ontario from 1923 to 1934 and from 1937 to 1939 as a member of the Progressive Conservative Party of Ontario.

in 1926, Finlayson became the Minister of Lands and Forests in the government of Howard Ferguson, which he would continue to hold until 1934. Prior to his appointment, Ernest H. Finlayson (his half-brother and the head of the Dominion Forest Service since 1925) gave him an intensive crash-course in silviculture, which "resulted in... [Minister Finlayson]... stepping into the job with, perhaps, a greater knowledge of the principles of forestry than has probably been the case with any other non-technical man who has occupied a Cabinet post." In 1927, Finlayson declared to the Legislature:

[T]imber must be treated as a crop and not as a mine.

As Minister, he was responsible for the passage of several Acts relating to forestry in Ontario (although their effectiveness has since been questioned):

- The Forestry Act, 1927 (which provided for the expropriation of lands for forestry purposes, and for the moving of inhabitants of barren lands (such as the Trent watershed) to other agricultural areas, including the Great Clay Belt)
- The Provincial Forests Act, 1929 (which created provincial Forest Reserves)
- The Pulpwood Conservation Act, 1929 (which required lumber companies to institute reforestation plans for the areas they held under license)

In addition to the Department of Lands and Forests, he was also assigned responsibility for the Department of Northern Development. He also became an advocate for the expansion of the provincial parks system — probably the first influential politician in the Province to do so — and was instrumental in swapping timber limits with the Spanish River Company in order to save the natural beauty of Trout Lake (later renamed as O.S.A. Lake), which was incorporated in 1964 into the newly created Killarney Provincial Park.

Losing his seat in 1934, he was subsequently reelected in 1937. In 1939, he resigned his seat in order to enable George Drew, the new party leader, to be elected to the Assembly. He died in 1943, after a brief illness.

== Legacy ==
Several places in the province have been named after Finlayson:

- Finlayson Township, formerly a geographic township in the District of Nipissing, is now part of the Township of Lake of Bays in the District Municipality of Muskoka.
- Finlayson Point, established as a provincial campground in Temagami (part of the District of Nipissing), became Finlayson Point Provincial Park in the mid-1950s
