= Miscampbell =

Miscampbell is a surname. Notable people with the surname include:

- Andrew Miscampbell (1848–1905), Canadian politician
- Norman Miscampbell (1925–2007), British politician
