= Reginald Howden =

Canadian Anglican priest

Herbert Reginald Howden (called Reginald) was a Canadian Anglican priest in the 20th century.

Howden was educated at the University of Toronto. Ordained in 1937, his first post was a curacy at St Clement, Toronto. He held incumbencies at Lakefield, Barrie and Thornhill. He was Archdeacon of Scarborough from 1974 to 1976.
