= John McPhee (disambiguation) =

John McPhee (born 1931) is an American writer.

John McPhee may also refer to:

- John McPhee (politician) (1878–1952), Premier of Tasmania
- John McPhee (footballer) (1937–2015), Scottish footballer
- John McPhee (motorcyclist) (born 1994), British Grand Prix motorcycle racer
- John Duncan McPhee (1894–1953), physician and politician in Ontario, Canada
- Bid McPhee (John Alexander McPhee, 1859–1943), American baseball player

== See also ==
- John McFee (born 1950), singer/songwriter
