= Paul Nicholas Mason =

Canadian writer (born 1958)

- Born: 1958 (age 67–68); London, England
- Known for: novelist, playwright, and actor
- Spouse: Nathalie Paulin

Paul Nicholas Mason (born 1958) is an English-born Canadian novelist, playwright, and actor.

== Early years ==
Mason was born in London, England. He lived as a child in Rhodesia (now Zimbabwe) and British Columbia before settling in southern Ontario, where he finished high school. After graduating from Trent University in Peterborough with an honors degree in English Literature, and a B.Ed. from Queen's University at Kingston, he taught English and Drama for 32 years at Lakefield College School. He published his first novel in 2005 and retired from teaching in 2015.

== Career as a novelist ==
Mason's first novel, Battered Soles, was published by Turnstone Press in 2005. The novel celebrates a fictional pilgrimage from Peterborough, Ontario, to the small village of Lakefield, where there is, Mason asserts, a statue of a blue-skinned Jesus with healing powers in the basement of St. John's Anglican Church. The tone of the novel is comic but there are moments of pathos. It was nominated for the Stephen Leacock Medal for Humour in 2005.

Mason's second novel, The Red Dress, was published by Turnstone in 2008. The story of a 17-year-old young man growing up poor and confused in rural Ontario, it is darker than Battered Soles, but the ending is cautiously hopeful. The Red Dress was long-listed for the 2009 ReLit award.

Mason's third novel, The Night Drummer, was published by Vancouver's Now or Never Press in 2015. It is the story of two teenage friends—white middle-class Peter Ellis, and Otis James, a native boy adopted by an evangelical Christian couple old enough to be his grandparents. Peter and Otis grow up in small town Ontario in the 1970s, and the novel follows them through their high school years. "As Ellis sleeplessly anticipates his high school's looming 25-year reunion, his recollections balance moments of encroaching darkness with plenty of joyous light," says Publishers Weekly. "Ellis’s memories of first loves and jobs and an endearingly oddball assortment of friends, including Otis, a preternaturally wise and kind Ojibwe boy adopted by devout Caucasian parents, give this portrait a welcome sweetness that draws attention to the innocence, sheer possibility, and blithe lightheartedness of youth." A review in the Autumn 2017 issue of The Link reads, "The 1970s were a vibrant time of progressive change, and with its evocation of growing up in that wonderful era The Night Drummer makes for fascinating and entertaining reading."

A fourth novel, The Rogue Wave, was published in April 2021. Canadian librarians voted it one of three "Most Anticipated Canadian books published" that month.

A fifth novel, To Our Graves, was released in March 2024. "The idea that anyone could be the killer is at the centre of To Our Graves, the newest novel from Paul Nicholas Mason," reads the review in The Miramichi Reader. "Surprising and welcome...It made me want to check out Mason's other books as well." Michelle Berry, writing on the Wolsak & Wynn blog, says, "Fast-paced, gripping and engrossing, Mason plays with the idea of whether or not this crime was committed by forces inside the school or by someone coming in from outside. The setting of this Canadian private school is incredibly realistic and entrancing."<https://www.wolsakandwynn.ca/blog/2024/10/15/unputdownable-canadian-mysteries-and-thrillers>

Mason's sixth novel, Sackville House, was published by Now or Never of Vancouver in August of 2026. The book is apparently inspired by Evelyn Waugh's Brideshead Revisited. "The colorful, diverse cast mirrors the complexities found in real life, and Mason (To Our Graves) skillfully offers both comical and sorrowful glimpses into individuals who, just like Michael, are searching for meaning beyond themselves," says Publishers Weekly in a review published November 2nd of 2026.

Mason's plays The Discipline Committee and Circles of Grace (1995) have been produced in Canada, Ireland and the United States. His play Sister Camille's Kaleidoscopic Cabaret won the Christians in Theatre Arts Full Length Play award in 1996, and premiered in Michigan in 1998.

Now or Never published Mason's first children's book, A Pug Called Poppy, in the fall of 2017.

== Bibliography ==
- The Discipline Committee Woodstock, Illinois: Dramatic Publishing, 1995.
- Circles of Grace Woodstock, Illinois: Dramatic Publishing, 1995.
- Battered Soles Winnipeg: Turnstone Press, 2005.
- The Red Dress Winnipeg: Turnstone Press, 2008.
- The Night Drummer Vancouver: Now or Never Publishing, 2015.
- Jim's Star & Other Christmas Stories Peterborough: House Nash Press, 2015
- A Pug Called Poppy Vancouver: Now or Never Publishing, 2017.
- Maisie's Bench Peterborough: House Nash Press, 2021
- The Rogue Wave Vancouver: Now or Never Publishing, 2021
- To Our Graves Vancouver: Now or Never Publishing, 2024
- Sackville House Vancouver: Now or Never Publishing, 2026

== Career as an Actor ==
Mason began a new career in 2015 as a voice-, television- and film-actor. He has principal roles in several independent feature films, including Super Detention, The Witches' Ball, Darts, Santa's Castle, Bloodslinger, Christmas with a Prince: the Royal Wedding, and Love by Accident, and supporting roles in The Customer, The Mechanical Boy and Speak Your Mind. (He has several smaller roles in a number of other films.) He also has small principal roles in the CBS television series Blood & Treasure and Brain Power Studio's The Jane Mysteries, and appears briefly in single episodes of series such as Anne with an E, Man Seeking Woman, Rabbit Hole, PonySitters Club and TallBoyz. He has also done voice-overs for, among other campaigns, the Mirvish production of Harry Potter & the Cursed Child.
