= Simcoe East (provincial electoral district) =

Ontario electoral district

Defunct provincial electoral district
- Legislature: Legislative Assembly of Ontario
- District created: 1875
- District abolished: 1999
- First contested: 1875
- Last contested: 1995

Simcoe East was an electoral riding in Ontario, Canada. It was created in 1875 and was abolished in 1996 before the 1999 election.

== Members of Provincial Parliament ==
Simcoe East
Assembly	Years	Member	Party
3rd	1875–1879	John Kean	Conservative
4th	1879–1882	Herman Henry Cook	Liberal
4th	1882–1883	Charles Alfred Drury	Liberal
5th	1883–1886	Charles Alfred Drury	Liberal
6th	1886–1890	Charles Alfred Drury	Liberal
7th	1890–1894	Andrew Miscampbell	Conservative
8th	1894–1898	Andrew Miscampbell	Conservative
9th	1898–1902	Andrew Miscampbell	Conservative
10th	1902–1904	James Brockett Tudhope	Liberal
11th	1905–1908	James Brockett Tudhope	Liberal
12th	1908–1911	James Brockett Tudhope	Liberal
13th	1911–1914	James Irwin Hartt	Conservative
14th	1914–1919	James Irwin Hartt	Conservative
15th	1919–1923	John Benjamin Johnston	United Farmers
16th	1923–1926	William Finlayson	Conservative
17th	1926–1929	William Finlayson	Conservative
18th	1929–1934	William Finlayson	Conservative
19th	1934–1937	Garnet Edward Tanner	Liberal
20th	1937–1939	William Finlayson	Conservative
20th	1939–1943	George Alexander Drew	Conservative
21st	1943–1945	John Duncan McPhee	Progressive Conservative
22nd	1945–1948	John Duncan McPhee	Progressive Conservative
23rd	1948–1951	John Duncan McPhee	Progressive Conservative
24th	1951–1953	John Duncan McPhee	Progressive Conservative
24th	1954–1955	Lloyd Averall Letherby	Progressive Conservative
25th	1955–1959	Lloyd Averall Letherby	Progressive Conservative
26th	1959–1963	Lloyd Averall Letherby	Progressive Conservative
27th	1963–1967	Lloyd Averall Letherby	Progressive Conservative
28th	1967–1971	Gordon Elsworth Smith	Progressive Conservative
29th	1971–1975	Gordon Elsworth Smith	Progressive Conservative
30th	1975–1977	Gordon Elsworth Smith	Progressive Conservative
31st	1977–1981	Gordon Elsworth Smith	Progressive Conservative
32nd	1981–1985	Al McLean	Progressive Conservative
33rd	1985–1987	Al McLean	Progressive Conservative
34th	1987–1990	Al McLean	Progressive Conservative
35th	1990–1995	Al McLean	Progressive Conservative
36th	1995–1999	Al McLean	Progressive Conservative
Sourced from the Ontario Legislative Assembly
Merged into Simcoe—Grey before the 1999 election

== Election results ==
1995 Ontario general election
Party	Candidate	Votes	%	±%
Progressive Conservative	Al McLean	23,489	60.97	+21.32
Liberal	Ralph Cipolla	9,044	23.48	+4.17
New Democratic	Marg Ducie	4,849	12.59	–25.08
Independent	Allan MacDonald	876	2.27	–
Natural Law	Siggi Lamothe	266	0.69	–
Total valid votes		38,524	99.03	
Total rejected, unmarked and declined ballots		377	0.97	–0.14
Turnout		38,901	66.52	–0.94
Eligible voters		58,477		
Progressive Conservative hold		Swing		+8.58
Source: Elections Ontario

1990 Ontario general election
Party	Candidate	Votes	%	±%
Progressive Conservative	Al McLean	14,828	39.65	+2.74
New Democratic	Dennis Bailey	14,088	37.67	+9.13
Liberal	Jim Files	7,219	19.30	–15.24
Libertarian	John W. McLean	1,263	3.38	–
Total valid votes		37,398	98.89	
Total rejected, unmarked and declined ballots		420	1.11	+0.49
Turnout		37,818	67.46	+0.57
Eligible voters		56,058		
Progressive Conservative hold		Swing		–3.20
Source: Elections Ontario

1987 Ontario general election
Party	Candidate	Votes	%	±%
Progressive Conservative	Al McLean	12,543	36.91	–4.95
Liberal	Butch Orser	11,737	34.54	+10.85
New Democratic	Fayne Bullen	9,699	28.54	–5.90
Total valid votes		33,979	99.38	
Total rejected ballots		213	0.62	–0.01
Turnout		34,192	66.90	+3.46
Eligible voters		51,112		
Progressive Conservative hold		Swing		–7.90
Source: Elections Ontario

1985 Ontario general election
Party	Candidate	Votes	%	±%
Progressive Conservative	Al McLean	13,371	41.86	–0.26
New Democratic	Fayne Bullen	11,002	34.45	+3.80
Liberal	George MacDonald	7,566	23.69	–1.01
Total valid votes		31,939	99.37	
Total rejected ballots		204	0.63	+0.38
Turnout		32,143	63.44	–0.90
Eligible voters		50,666		
Progressive Conservative hold		Swing		–2.03
Source: Elections Ontario

1981 Ontario general election
Party	Candidate	Votes	%	±%
Progressive Conservative	Al McLean	12,487	42.13	–2.61
New Democratic	Fayne Bullen	9,085	30.65	–2.61
Liberal	Jack Harber	7,320	24.70	+2.69
Independent	Ted Wolda	749	2.53	–
Total valid votes		29,641	99.74	
Total rejected ballots		76	0.26	–0.11
Turnout		29,717	64.34	–5.07
Eligible voters		46,184		
Progressive Conservative hold		Swing		–0.00
Source: Elections Ontario

1977 Ontario general election
Party	Candidate	Votes	%	±%
Progressive Conservative	Gordon Elsworth Smith	13,793	44.74	+5.26
New Democratic	Roger Pretty	10,254	33.26	–2.35
Liberal	Elinor Bingham	6,783	22.00	–2.91
Total valid votes		30,830	99.64	
Total rejected ballots		112	0.36	+0.04
Turnout		30,942	69.41	+0.13
Eligible voters		44,578		
Progressive Conservative hold		Swing		+3.80
Source: Elections Ontario

1975 Ontario general election
Party	Candidate	Votes	%	±%
Progressive Conservative	Gordon Elsworth Smith	11,622	39.48	–8.93
New Democratic	Roger Pretty	10,482	35.61	+9.06
Liberal	Elinor Bingham	7,334	24.91	–0.13
Total valid votes		29,438	99.68	
Total rejected ballots		96	0.33	+0.09
Turnout		29,534	69.28	–4.05
Eligible voters		42,628		
Progressive Conservative hold		Swing		–8.99
Source: Elections Ontario

1971 Ontario general election
Party	Candidate	Votes	%	±%
Progressive Conservative	Gordon Elsworth Smith	12,109	48.41	–6.13
New Democratic	Roger Pretty	6,641	26.55	+7.23
Liberal	Bill McGill	6,264	25.04	–1.09
Total valid votes		25,014	99.76	
Total rejected ballots		59	0.24	–0.40
Turnout		25,073	73.33	+12.14
Eligible voters		34,191		
Progressive Conservative hold		Swing		–6.68
Source: Elections Ontario

1967 Ontario general election
Party	Candidate	Votes	%	±%
Progressive Conservative	Gordon Elsworth Smith	9,057	54.54	–3.10
Liberal	Alex Gilmour	4,340	26.14	–10.63
New Democratic	Gordon Stanley	3,208	19.32	+13.73
Total valid votes		16,605	99.37	
Total rejected ballots		106	0.63	–0.03
Turnout		16,711	61.19	–3.65
Eligible voters		27,310		
Progressive Conservative hold		Swing		+3.76
Source: Elections Ontario

1963 Ontario general election
Party	Candidate	Votes	%	±%
Progressive Conservative	Lloyd Letherby	9,646	57.65	+0.37
Liberal	J. A. Pete McGarvey	6,152	36.77	+7.49
New Democratic	Cecil Hobson	935	5.59	–2.00
Total valid votes		16,733	99.34	
Total rejected ballots		112	0.66	–0.59
Turnout		16,845	64.84	+2.96
Eligible voters		25,981		
Progressive Conservative hold		Swing		–3.56
Source: Elections Ontario

1959 Ontario general election
Party	Candidate	Votes	%	±%
Progressive Conservative	Lloyd Letherby	8,631	57.28	+2.59
Liberal	Jack Andre	4,411	29.27	–7.31
Co-operative Commonwealth	Wilfred R. Hoult	1,144	7.59	–1.13
Independent PC	William Argue	882	5.85	–
Total valid votes		15,068	98.74	
Total rejected ballots		192	1.26	+0.41
Turnout		15,260	61.88	–4.95
Eligible voters		24,661		
Progressive Conservative hold		Swing		+4.95
Source: Elections Ontario

1955 Ontario general election
Party	Candidate	Votes	%	±%
Progressive Conservative	Lloyd Letherby	8,436	54.69	–0.09
Liberal	D. Smith Campbell	5,644	36.59	+1.60
Co-operative Commonwealth	George Brough	1,346	8.73	–1.51
Total valid votes		15,426	99.15	
Total rejected ballots		132	0.85	+0.29
Turnout		15,558	66.83	+3.44
Eligible voters		23,279		
Progressive Conservative hold		Swing		–0.85
Source: Elections Ontario

Ontario provincial by-election, February 8, 1954 Resignation of John Duncan McPhee to enter federal politics
Party	Candidate	Votes	%	±%
Progressive Conservative	Lloyd Letherby	7,715	54.78	–1.13
Liberal	William C. Moore	4,927	34.98	+2.16
Co-operative Commonwealth	Wilfred Hoult	1,442	10.24	–1.03
Total valid votes		14,084	99.44	
Total rejected ballots		79	0.56	–0.14
Turnout		14,163	63.39	–9.29
Eligible voters		22,343		
Progressive Conservative hold		Swing		–1.64
Source: Elections Ontario

1951 Ontario general election
Party	Candidate	Votes	%	±%
Progressive Conservative	John Duncan McPhee	8,634	55.91	+12.73
Liberal	John R. McIsaac	5,069	32.82	–3.57
Co-operative Commonwealth	Wilfred R. Hoult	1,741	11.27	–9.16
Total valid votes		15,444	99.30	
Total rejected ballots		109	0.70	+0.14
Turnout		15,553	72.68	+1.08
Eligible voters		21,400		
Progressive Conservative hold		Swing		+8.15
Source: Elections Ontario

1948 Ontario general election
Party	Candidate	Votes	%	±%
Progressive Conservative	John Duncan McPhee	6,376	43.17	–6.88
Liberal	William L. Moore	5,374	36.39	+8.32
Co-operative Commonwealth	Lionel P. Dion	3,018	20.44	–1.44
Total valid votes		14,768	99.43	
Total rejected ballots		84	0.57	+0.08
Turnout		14,852	71.60	+7.28
Eligible voters		20,744		
Progressive Conservative hold		Swing		–7.60
Source: Elections Ontario

1945 Ontario general election
Party	Candidate	Votes	%	±%
Progressive Conservative	John Duncan McPhee	7,433	50.05	+6.29
Liberal	Alexander McKay Forbes	4,168	28.07	–0.80
Co-operative Commonwealth	Ray Doolittle	3,249	21.88	–5.49
Total valid votes		14,850	99.51	
Total rejected ballots		73	0.49	–0.12
Turnout		14,923	64.32	+4.90
Eligible voters		23,203		
Progressive Conservative hold		Swing		+3.55
Source: Elections Ontario

1943 Ontario general election
Party	Candidate	Votes	%	±%
Progressive Conservative	John Duncan McPhee	4,766	43.76	–
Liberal	George Patterson	3,144	28.87	–
Co-operative Commonwealth	Percy Crawford	2,980	27.36	–
Total valid votes		10,890	99.39	
Total rejected ballots		67	0.61	–
Turnout		10,957	59.42	–
Eligible voters		18,440		
Progressive Conservative gain from Conservative		Swing		–
Source: Elections Ontario

Ontario provincial by-election, February 14, 1939 Resignation of William Finlayson to provide a seat for Conservative leader Drew
Party	Candidate	Votes
Conservative	George A. Drew	acclaimed
Source: Elections Ontario

1937 Ontario general election
Party	Candidate	Votes	%	±%
Conservative	William Finlayson	7,606	50.34	+7.49
Liberal	Garnet Edward Tanner	7,503	49.66	–7.49
Total valid votes		15,109	99.31	
Total rejected ballots		105	0.69	+0.36
Turnout		15,214	71.31	–9.33
Eligible voters		21,336		
Conservative gain from Liberal		Swing		+7.49
Source: Elections Ontario

1934 Ontario general election
Party	Candidate	Votes	%	±%
Liberal	Garnet Edward Tanner	9,327	57.15	+18.78
Conservative	William Finlayson	6,993	42.85	–18.78
Total valid votes		16,320	99.67	
Total rejected ballots		54	0.33	–0.29
Turnout		16,374	80.64	+9.89
Eligible voters		20,305		
Liberal gain from Conservative		Swing		+18.78
Source: Elections Ontario

1929 Ontario general election
Party	Candidate	Votes	%	±%
Conservative	William Finlayson	7,980	61.63	+5.78
Liberal	James G. Harvie	4,969	38.37	–
Total valid votes		12,949	99.38	
Total rejected ballots		81	0.62	+0.42
Turnout		13,030	70.75	–0.34
Eligible voters		18,416		
Conservative hold		Swing		+2.89
Source: Elections Ontario

1926 Ontario general election
Party	Candidate	Votes	%	±%
Conservative	William Finlayson	7,312	55.84	–1.73
Liberal–Progressive	Thomas Edwin Ross	5,782	44.16	–
Total valid votes		13,094	99.79	
Total rejected ballots		27	0.21	–0.80
Turnout		13,121	71.09	+13.36
Eligible voters		18,456		
Conservative hold		Swing		–0.87
Source: Elections Ontario

1923 Ontario general election
Party	Candidate	Votes	%	±%
Conservative	William Finlayson	5,692	57.58	+20.69
United Farmers	John Benjamin Johnston	4,194	42.42	+1.65
Total valid votes		9,886	99.00	
Total rejected ballots		100	1.00	–2.17
Turnout		9,986	57.74	–13.67
Eligible voters		17,296		
Conservative gain from United Farmers		Swing		+9.52
Source: Elections Ontario

1919 Ontario general election
Party	Candidate	Votes	%	±%
United Farmers	John Benjamin Johnston	5,063	40.78	–
Conservative	James Irwin Hartt	4,580	36.89	–21.02
Independent	Duncan Cameron Anderson	2,773	22.33	–
Total valid votes		12,416	96.83	
Total rejected ballots		407	3.17	+2.41
Turnout		12,823	71.41	–0.74
Eligible voters		17,957		
United Farmers gain from Conservative		Swing		–
Source: Elections Ontario

1914 Ontario general election
Party	Candidate	Votes	%	±%
Conservative	James Irwin Hartt	3,293	57.90	+5.10
Liberal	Herbert Cooke	2,394	42.10	–5.10
Total valid votes		5,687	99.23	
Total rejected ballots		44	0.77	–0.03
Turnout		5,731	72.15	+6.78
Eligible voters		7,943		
Conservative hold		Swing		+5.10
Source: Elections Ontario

1911 Ontario general election
Party	Candidate	Votes	%	±%
Conservative	James Irwin Hartt	3,103	52.80	+4.29
Liberal	Erastus Long	2,774	47.20	–4.29
Total valid votes		5,877	99.21	
Total rejected ballots		47	0.79	+0.15
Turnout		5,924	65.37	–10.00
Eligible voters		9,062		
Conservative gain from Liberal		Swing		+4.29
Source: Elections Ontario

1908 Ontario general election
Party	Candidate	Votes	%	±%
Liberal	James Brockett Tudhope	3,105	51.49	–0.43
Conservative	James Irwin Hartt	2,925	48.51	+0.43
Total valid votes		6,030	99.36	
Total rejected ballots		39	0.64	–0.00
Turnout		6,069	75.37	–2.31
Eligible voters		8,052		
Liberal hold		Swing		–0.43
Source: Elections Ontario

1905 Ontario general election
Party	Candidate	Votes	%	±%
Liberal	James Brockett Tudhope	3,284	51.92	–1.64
Conservative	J. McIntosh	3,041	48.08	+1.64
Total valid votes		6,325	99.36	
Total rejected ballots		41	0.64	+0.58
Turnout		6,366	77.68	–0.73
Eligible voters		8,195		
Liberal hold		Swing		–1.64
Source: Elections Ontario

1902 Ontario general election
Party	Candidate	Votes	%	±%
Liberal	James Brockett Tudhope	3,365	53.56	+4.23
Conservative	R. H. Jupp	2,918	46.44	–4.23
Total valid votes		6,283	99.94	
Total rejected ballots		4	0.06	+0.06
Turnout		6,287	78.41	–21.55
Eligible voters		8,018		
Liberal gain from Conservative		Swing		+4.23
Source: Elections Ontario

1898 Ontario general election
Party	Candidate	Votes	%	±%
Conservative	Andrew Miscampbell	2,593	50.67	+7.46
Liberal	N.M. Harvey	2,524	49.33	+8.77
Total valid votes		5,117	100.00	
Total rejected ballots		–		
Turnout		5,117	99.96	+32.90
Eligible voters		5,119		
Conservative hold		Swing		–0.65
Source: Elections Ontario

1894 Ontario general election
Party	Candidate	Votes	%	±%
Conservative	Andrew Miscampbell	2,021	43.21	–8.75
Liberal	N.M. Harvey	1,897	40.56	–7.48
Conservative-Patron	William Lawson	759	16.23	–
Total valid votes		4,677	99.22	
Total rejected ballots		37	0.78	+0.02
Turnout		4,714	67.07	+4.48
Eligible voters		7,029		
Conservative hold		Swing		–0.64
Source: Elections Ontario

1890 Ontario general election
Party	Candidate	Votes	%	±%
Conservative	Andrew Miscampbell	2,092	51.96	–
Liberal	Charles Alfred Drury	1,934	48.04	–
Total valid votes		4,026	99.24	
Total rejected ballots		31	0.76	–
Turnout		4,057	62.59	–
Eligible voters		6,482		
Conservative gain from Liberal		Swing		–
Source: Elections Ontario

Ontario provincial by-election, May 16, 1888 Ministerial by-election, upon appointment as Commissioner of Agriculture
Party	Candidate	Votes
Liberal	Charles Alfred Drury	acclaimed
Source: Elections Ontario

1886 Ontario general election
Party	Candidate	Votes	%	±%
Liberal	Charles Alfred Drury	1,805	53.15	+1.19
Conservative	J. M. Clarke	1,591	46.85	–1.19
Total valid votes		3,396	99.65	
Total rejected ballots		12	0.35	+0.35
Turnout		3,408	62.16	–
Eligible voters		5,483		
Liberal hold		Swing		+1.19
Source: Elections Ontario

Ontario provincial by-election, June 26, 1885 Void election
Party	Candidate	Votes	%	±%
Liberal	Charles Alfred Drury	1,553	51.96	+1.58
Conservative	Mr. Thompson	1,436	48.04	–1.58
Total valid votes		2,989	100.00	
Total rejected ballots		–		
Turnout		2,989	–	–
Eligible voters				
Liberal hold		Swing		+1.58
Source: Elections Ontario

1883 Ontario general election
Party	Candidate	Votes	%	±%
Liberal	Charles Alfred Drury	1,403	50.38	–5.01
Conservative	Mr. Thompson	1,382	49.62	+5.01
Total valid votes		2,785	99.54	
Total rejected ballots		13	0.46	+0.46
Turnout		2,798	65.70	–
Eligible voters		4,259		
Liberal hold		Swing		–5.01
Source: Elections Ontario

Ontario provincial by-election, October 18, 1882 Resignation of Hermon Henry Cook to contest the 1882 federal election
Party	Candidate	Votes	%	±%
Liberal	Charles Alfred Drury	1,290	55.39	–1.44
Conservative	J.W. Slavin	1,039	44.61	+1.44
Total valid votes		2,329	100.00	
Total rejected ballots		–		
Turnout		2,329	–	–
Eligible voters				
Liberal hold		Swing		–1.44
Source: Elections Ontario

1879 Ontario general election
Party	Candidate	Votes	%	±%
Liberal	Hermon Henry Cook	1,324	56.82	+10.83
Conservative	H. Steele	1,006	43.18	−10.83
Total valid votes		2,330	61.72	−12.18
Eligible voters		3,775		
Liberal gain from Conservative		Swing		+10.83
Source: Elections Ontario

1875 Ontario general election
Party	Candidate	Votes	%
Conservative	John Kean	1,133	54.00
Liberal	H.M. Sutherland	965	46.00
Total valid votes		2,098	73.90
Eligible voters		2,839	
Conservative pickup new district.			
Source: Elections Ontario
