= Thomas Edward Manley Chew =

Canadian politician

Thomas Edward Manley Chew (11 August 1874 – 17 December 1928) was a lumber merchant and political figure in Ontario, Canada. He represented Simcoe East in the House of Commons of Canada from 1908 to 1911 and from 1921 to 1925 as a Liberal.

He was born in Rugby, Ontario as the son of George Chew and Sophia Lawrence, and was educated in Midland and Toronto. He lived in Midland. In 1900, he married Effie Mae Ann Williams. Chew was defeated when he ran for re-election in 1911, 1917 and 1925. He died in Preston Springs at the age of 54.

== Elections ==
1908 Canadian federal election: Simcoe East
Party	Candidate	Votes
Liberal	Thomas Edward Manley Chew	3,417
Conservative	William Humphrey Bennett	3,153

1911 Canadian federal election: Simcoe East
Party	Candidate	Votes
Conservative	William Humphrey Bennett	3,315
Liberal	Thomas Edward Manley Chew	2,849

1917 Canadian federal election: Simcoe East
Party	Candidate	Votes
Government (Unionist)	James Brockett Tudhope	6,669
Opposition (Laurier Liberals)	Thomas Edward Manley Chew	3,076

1921 Canadian federal election: Simcoe East
Party	Candidate	Votes
Liberal	Thomas Edward Manley Chew	7,414
Conservative	Richard Raikes	4,810
Progressive	Thomas Foster Swindle	3,414

1925 Canadian federal election: Simcoe East
Party	Candidate	Votes
Conservative	Alfred Burke Thompson	7,658
Liberal	Thomas Edward Manley Chew	6,929
