= Simcoe East (federal electoral district) =

Former federal electoral district in Ontario, Canada

Ontario electoral district

Defunct federal electoral district
- Legislature: House of Commons
- District created: 1882
- District abolished: 1966
- First contested: 1882
- Last contested: 1965

Simcoe East was a federal electoral district in the province of Ontario, Canada, that was represented in the House of Commons of Canada from 1882 to 1968. This riding was created in 1882 from parts of Muskoka riding.

The "East Riding of the county of Simcoe" initially consisted of the townships of Tay, Medonte, Oro, Orillia, Matchedash, Muskoka, Wood, Medora, Monck and Tiny, the villages of Gravenhurst and Midland, and the towns of Orillia and Penetanguishene.

In 1903, it was redefined to consist of the townships of Matchedash, Medonte, Orillia North, Orillia South, Tay and Tiny, and the towns of Midland, Orillia and Penetanguishene. In 1914, it was redefined to include the villages of Coldwater and Victoria Harbour.

In 1924, it was redefined to consist of that part of the county of Simcoe lying north of (and including) the township of Tiny, the township of Medonte and the township of Orillia South.

The electoral district was abolished in 1966 when it was redistributed between Grey—Simcoe, Parry Sound-Muskoka and Simcoe North ridings.

== Members of Parliament ==
This riding elected the following members of the House of Commons of Canada:

Parliament	Years	Member	Party
Riding created from Muskoka
5th	1882–1887	Hermon Henry Cook	Liberal
6th	1887–1891	Hermon Henry Cook	Liberal
7th	1891–1892	Philip Howard Spohn	Liberal
7th	1892–1896	William Humphrey Bennett	Conservative
8th	1896–1897	William Humphrey Bennett	Conservative
8th	1897–1900	William Humphrey Bennett	Conservative
9th	1900–1904	William Humphrey Bennett	Conservative
10th	1904–1908	William Humphrey Bennett	Conservative
11th	1908–1911	Thomas Edward Manley Chew	Liberal
12th	1911–1917	William Humphrey Bennett	Conservative
13th	1917–1921	James Brockett Tudhope	Government (Unionist)
14th	1921–1925	Thomas Edward Manley Chew	Liberal
15th	1925–1926	Alfred Burke Thompson	Conservative
16th	1926–1930	Alfred Burke Thompson	Conservative
17th	1930–1935	Alfred Burke Thompson	Conservative
18th	1935–1940	George McLean	Liberal
19th	1940–1945	George McLean	Liberal
20th	1945–1949	William Alfred Robinson	Liberal
21st	1949–1953	William Alfred Robinson	Liberal
22nd	1953–1957	William Alfred Robinson	Liberal
23rd	1957–1958	Philip Bernard Rynard	Progressive Conservative
24th	1958–1962	Philip Bernard Rynard	Progressive Conservative
25th	1962–1963	Philip Bernard Rynard	Progressive Conservative
26th	1963–1965	Philip Bernard Rynard	Progressive Conservative
27th	1965–1968	Philip Bernard Rynard	Progressive Conservative
Riding dissolved into Grey—Simcoe, Parry Sound-Muskoka and Simcoe North

== Election results ==
1882 Canadian federal election
Party	Candidate	Votes
Liberal	Hermon Henry Cook	1,468
Unknown	James Quinn	1,330

1887 Canadian federal election
Party	Candidate	Votes
Liberal	Hermon Henry Cook	2,482
Unknown	James Quinn	2,408

1891 Canadian federal election
Party	Candidate	Votes
Liberal	Philip Howard Spohn	2,850
Conservative	William Humphrey Bennett	2,643

By-election: On election being declared void, 25 February 1892: Simcoe East
Party	Candidate	Votes	%	±%
Conservative	William Humphrey Bennett	acclaimed		

1896 Canadian federal election
Party	Candidate	Votes
Conservative	William Humphrey Bennett	2,775
Liberal	Hermon Henry Cook	2,539
Patrons of Industry	D. C. Anderson	1,197

By-election: On Mr. Bennett's election declared void, 4 February 1897: Simcoe East
Party	Candidate	Votes	%	±%
Conservative	William Humphrey Bennett	3,236		
Liberal	Hermon Henry Cook	3,111		

1900 Canadian federal election
Party	Candidate	Votes
Conservative	William Humphrey Bennett	3,486
Liberal	George Chew	3,447

1904 Canadian federal election
Party	Candidate	Votes
Conservative	William Humphrey Bennett	3,116
Liberal	Ronald David Gunn	2,743

1908 Canadian federal election
Party	Candidate	Votes
Liberal	Thomas Edward Manley Chew	3,417
Conservative	William Humphrey Bennett	3,153

1911 Canadian federal election
Party	Candidate	Votes
Conservative	William Humphrey Bennett	3,315
Liberal	Thomas Edward Manley Chew	2,849

1917 Canadian federal election
Party	Candidate	Votes
Government (Unionist)	James Brockett Tudhope	6,669
Opposition (Laurier Liberals)	Thomas Edward Manley Chew	3,076

1921 Canadian federal election
Party	Candidate	Votes
Liberal	Thomas Edward Manley Chew	7,414
Conservative	Richard Raikes	4,810
Progressive	Thomas Foster Swindle	3,414

1925 Canadian federal election
Party	Candidate	Votes
Conservative	Alfred Burke Thompson	7,658
Liberal	Thomas Edward Manley Chew	6,929

1926 Canadian federal election
Party	Candidate	Votes
Conservative	Alfred Burke Thompson	7,994
Liberal	Fred W. Grant	7,669

1930 Canadian federal election
Party	Candidate	Votes
Conservative	Alfred Burke Thompson	7,974
Liberal	George McLean	7,629

1935 Canadian federal election
Party	Candidate	Votes
Liberal	George McLean	8,219
Conservative	John S. Drinkwater	5,529
Reconstruction	Wilbur Merton Cramp	1,222
Co-operative Commonwealth	Frank Tissington	1,191
Independent	Donald Athenies MacNab	123

1940 Canadian federal election
Party	Candidate	Votes
Liberal	George McLean	8,470
National Government	Oliver Hereford Smith	7,024

1945 Canadian federal election
Party	Candidate	Votes
Liberal	William Alfred Robinson	8,508
Progressive Conservative	Lloyd Averall Letherby	6,978
Co-operative Commonwealth	William Douglas Smith	2,109

1949 Canadian federal election
Party	Candidate	Votes
Liberal	William Alfred Robinson	10,030
Progressive Conservative	John Elmer Wood	7,976
Co-operative Commonwealth	John Edward Skelton	2,095
Union of Electors	Marguerite Marchildon	404

1953 Canadian federal election
Party	Candidate	Votes
Liberal	William Alfred Robinson	9,099
Progressive Conservative	Philip Bernard Rynard	8,944
Co-operative Commonwealth	John Wilson Lovelace	1,310
Social Credit	Carl Clark Pinkney	533

1957 Canadian federal election
Party	Candidate	Votes
Progressive Conservative	Philip Bernard Rynard	12,497
Liberal	William Alfred Robinson	8,193
Co-operative Commonwealth	William Arthur Winchester	1,395
Independent	Charles Parker	726

1958 Canadian federal election
Party	Candidate	Votes
Progressive Conservative	Philip Bernard Rynard	15,149
Liberal	John R. MacIsaac	7,403
Co-operative Commonwealth	William A. Winchester	1,423

1962 Canadian federal election
Party	Candidate	Votes
Progressive Conservative	Philip Bernard Rynard	12,835
Liberal	John R. MacIsaac	8,688
New Democratic	Ray A. Ruggles	2,346
Social Credit	A. J. Stann	423

1963 Canadian federal election
Party	Candidate	Votes
Progressive Conservative	Philip Bernard Rynard	12,662
Liberal	Jerome J. Gignac	9,324
New Democratic	C. Perrie Rintoul	2,031
Social Credit	Bob Pinkney	1,054

1965 Canadian federal election
Party	Candidate	Votes
Progressive Conservative	Philip Bernard Rynard	11,648
Liberal	Wilson Morden	9,281
New Democratic	C. Perrie Rintoul	3,597

== See also ==
- List of Canadian electoral districts
- Historical federal electoral districts of Canada
