= Gordon Aiken =

Canadian politician (1918–2000)

Gordon Harvey Aiken
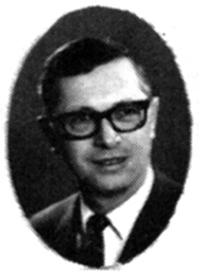
- Aiken, c. 1968

Member of the Canadian Parliament for Parry Sound-Muskoka
- In office October 14, 1957 – September 1, 1972
- Preceded by: Wilfred McDonald
- Succeeded by: Stan Darling

Personal details
- Born: September 26, 1918 Ripley, Ontario
- Died: February 12, 2000 (aged 81)
- Party: Progressive Conservative
- Education: Osgoode Hall Law School

Gordon Harvey Aiken (September 26, 1918 – February 12, 2000) was a Canadian lawyer, judge, and politician.

Born in Ripley, Ontario, he graduated from Osgoode Hall Law School in 1940. He was an officer of the Royal Hamilton Light Infantry during World War II serving in Europe. After the war, he practised law in Muskoka, Ontario and was a judge of the juvenile and family court from 1951 to 1956.

He was elected to the House of Commons of Canada representing the riding of Parry Sound-Muskoka in the 1957 federal election. A Progressive Conservative, he was re-elected five times in the 1958, 1962, 1963, 1965, and 1968 federal elections. From 1963 to 1972, he was the opposition critic in relation to the environment and was deputy house leader from 1967 to 1970.

He wrote the book The Backbencher - Trials and Tribulations of a Member of Parliament (1974, McClelland and Stewart Limited, ISBN 0-7710-0056-1). He also wrote the book The Returning Officer, a historical novel set in Muskoka (RO Publishing, ISBN 0-9691059-0-8).
