= Arthur Slaght =

Canadian politician

Member of Parliament for Parry Sound
- In office October 1935 – April 1945
- Preceded by: James Arthurs
- Succeeded by: Wilfred McDonald

Personal details
- Born: Arthur Graeme Slaght; 3 May 1877 Simcoe, Ontario
- Died: 21 January 1964 (aged 86)
- Party: Liberal
- Spouse(s): Evelyn Lukes m. 17 September 1903
- Profession: barrister, solicitor

Arthur Graeme Slaght (3 May 1877 – 21 January 1964) was a Canadian lawyer and politician. Slaght served as a Liberal party member of the House of Commons of Canada. He was born in Simcoe, Ontario.

Slaght attended secondary school at Simcoe, then studied at Osgoode Hall Law School.

He unsuccessfully attempted to win a seat in the House of Commons at Timiskaming riding in a by-election on 7 April 1920. He won the Parry Sound seat in the 1935 federal election and was re-elected there in 1940. After completing his term in the 19th Canadian Parliament, Slaght did not seek a further term in the 1945 election.
