= Andy Mitchell (politician) =

Canadian politician (born 1953)

The Honourable Andrew Mitchell PC

Member of the House of Commons of Canada for Parry Sound-Muskoka
- In office October 25, 1993 – January 23, 2006
- Preceded by: Stan Darling
- Succeeded by: Tony Clement

Minister of Agriculture and Agri-Food
- In office July 20, 2004 – February 5, 2006
- Preceded by: Bob Speller
- Succeeded by: Chuck Strahl

Minister of Indian Affairs and Northern Development
- In office December 12, 2003 – July 20, 2004
- Preceded by: Bob Nault
- Succeeded by: Andy Scott

Secretary of State for the Federal Economic Development Initiative for Northern Ontario Styled as Minister of State for the Federal Economic Development Initiative for Northern Ontario in 2005–06.
- In office June 28, 2005 – February 5, 2006
- Preceded by: Joe Comuzzi
- Succeeded by: Tony Clement
- In office August 3, 1999 – December 11, 2003
- Preceded by: position created
- Succeeded by: Joe Comuzzi

Secretary of State for Rural Development
- In office August 3, 1999 – December 11, 2003

Secretary of State for Parks
- In office June 11, 1997 – August 2, 1999

Deputy Reeve of Selwyn and member of the Peterborough County Council
- In office 2010–2014
- Preceded by: Mary Smith
- Succeeded by: Sherry Sennis

Mayor of Selwyn and member of the Peterborough County Council
- In office 2018–2022
- Preceded by: Mary Smith

Personal details
- Born: April 21, 1953 (age 73) Montreal, Quebec, Canada
- Party: Liberal
- Profession: banker, administrator

Andrew Mitchell, PC (born April 21, 1953) is a Canadian politician. He served in the House of Commons of Canada from 1993 to 2006, representing Parry Sound-Muskoka as a member of the Liberal Party. He was a secretary of state in the government of Jean Chrétien and a cabinet minister in the government of Paul Martin.

== Early life and career ==
Mitchell was born in Montreal, Quebec, and has a Bachelor of Arts degree in political science from Carleton University (1972). Before running for public office, he worked for the Bank of Nova Scotia in Ottawa, Toronto, Cornwall, Elliot Lake, and Gravenhurst. He was also active with several local Chamber of Commerce organizations. Mitchell joined the Liberal Party in 1991.

== Parliamentarian ==
=== Government backbencher ===
Mitchell was first elected in the 1993 federal election, winning a seat that had been held by the Progressive Conservatives since 1957. At the time, he did not have a strong public profile outside of his riding. The Liberals won a majority government, and Mitchell entered parliament as a backbench supporter of Jean Chrétien's government.

He chaired a parliamentary task force that examined banking and small business policy in 1994. Its recommendations included a code of conduct for banks regarding small business loans, an ombudsman to oversee this code of conduct, and a provision allowing entrepreneurs to borrow up to twenty per cent from their registered retirement savings plans (RRSPs). The proposed code of conduct was intended to facilitate more bank loans to small businesses.

In 1996, Mitchell was appointed to another task force that examined the role of the federal government in relation to Canada's disability community. It recommended that the government cancel its plans to wind down assistance programs for disabled people and instead introduce new programs and tax credits. Mitchell argued this investment was necessary to ensure disabled Canadians could enjoy the full rights of citizenship.

In the same period, he chaired a standing committee on natural resources with a focus on economic development in rural Canada. He supported construction of Fenbrook Institution, a medium security prison in Gravenhurst, as a benefit to the local economy.

=== Minister ===
Secretary of State for Parks

Mitchell was re-elected in the 1997 federal election against a strong challenge from former general Lewis MacKenzie, who was running for the Progressive Conservative Party. The Liberals were re-elected with a second majority government nationally, and Mitchell was appointed as secretary of state for parks in Chrétien's government. This was a ministerial position but not a full cabinet portfolio.

Shortly after his appointment, Mitchell announced that Canada's national parks would not be privatized or commercialized apart from a small number of projects that had already been approved in the previous parliament. He following year, he introduced legislation to create a permanent agency for Parks Canada. The oversight of national parks had previously shifted among various ministries, and Mitchell argued that the new agency would allow for more and better-managed parks.

In April 1998, Mitchell said the Canadian government would block a salvage company's plans to dynamite the wreckage of the Empress of Ireland ocean liner to recover an estimated one million dollars' worth of nickel ingots. Over one thousand people were killed when ship sank in the Saint Lawrence River in 1914, and Mitchell argued the detonation would violate Canada's laws against interference with human remains. Many of the deceased were members of the Salvation Army, which strongly opposed the detonation plans.

Mitchell joined with environmental groups in late 1998 to oppose a bid by the government of the Northwest Territories, the Inuvialuit, and the Toronto-based company Falconbridge Ltd. to change a proposed boundary of the Tuktut Nogait National Park and permit nickel mining in the disputed area. Mitchell argued that the change would endanger the local caribou population and noted that eighty per cent of the nickel find was already located outside of the park's boundaries. A committee of the Senate of Canada decided against moving the boundary in December 1998. The following year, Mitchell introduced legislation to restrict future development in all national parks and announced the creation of an aboriginal affairs secretariat to assist Parks Canada in matters relating to First Nations communities.

Mitchell supported a private member's bill introduced by Liberal backbencher Albina Guarnieri in 1998 to reduce parole opportunities for criminals convicted of multiple murders.

Secretary of State for Rural Development

In October 1999, Mitchell was reassigned as secretary of state for rural development and secretary of state for the federal economic development initiative for Northern Ontario (FedNor). In early 2000, he hosted Canada's first national rural conference in Magog, Quebec. He also introduced thirty-seven million dollars for small and medium-sized businesses in Ontario and new money for advanced grain identification technology in Manitoba.

Re-elected in the 2000 federal election, Mitchell helped formulate a federal loan to prevent bankruptcy at Algoma Steel in 2001. He later announced the creation of a sixteen-member advisory committee on rural issues at the second national rural conference in Charlottetown, Prince Edward Island.

In May 2002, Mitchell led a trade delegation to Atlanta, Georgia, to promote trade with Northern Ontario. Later in the same year, he promoted increased high-speed internet service for rural Canada and announced a fifteen million dollar plan to support co-operatives. In August 2003, he joined with Chrétien and Industry Minister Allan Rock to unveil Canada's Municipal Rural Infrastructure Fund, valued at one billion dollars.

Minister of Indian Affairs and Northern Development

Mitchell supported Paul Martin's bid to succeed Jean Chrétien as Liberal Party leader in 2003. When Martin replaced Chrétien as prime minister, he promoted Mitchell to a full cabinet position as Minister of Indian Affairs and Northern Development. Mitchell introduced new self-government legislation for Canadian indigenous communities in January 2004 and said that he would not re-introduce his predecessor's First Nations Governance Act, which had met with significant opposition from indigenous leaders.

Mitchell attended the Martin government's one-day summit with leaders of the Assembly of First Nations (AFN), the Inuit Tapiriit Kanatami, the Métis National Council, the Congress of Aboriginal Peoples, and the Native Women's Association of Canada in April 2004. He indicated that he was willing to fund a housing secretariat that would be operated by the AFN.

In early 2004, Mitchell recognized embattled grand chief James Gabriel and the elected band council as the legitimate authority in Kanesatake, Quebec. The Kanesatake community was divided into rival factions, and Gabriel was forced to leave the community for his safety after his house was burned down.

Minister of Agriculture

Mitchell was re-elected by a narrower margin in the 2004 federal election, as the Liberals were reduced to a minority government nationally. Following the election, he was reassigned as the Minister of Agriculture and Agri-food. He was also appointed as minister of state for the federal economic development initiative for Northern Ontario in June 2005, after Joe Comuzzi's resignation.

When Mitchell became agriculture minister, the American border was closed to Canadian cattle due to a case of bovine spongiform encephalopathy (BSE) found in a single Canadian cow in 2003. Mitchell's initial efforts to lift the ban were unsuccessful, and he announced $488 million to aid the ailing sector in September 2004. When other instances of BSE were discovered in early 2005, Mitchell said that a "low level and a declining level" of the disease in older cattle was not surprising, that changes introduced in 1997 would ensure the safety of Canadian beef, and that an organized cull of older animals would be too extreme a reaction.

Mitchell announced one billion dollars in aid farm aid in March 2005, primarily in response to the border closure but also to grain harvests affected by frost, drought in the Prairies, and trade difficulties associated with the higher Canadian dollar relative to the American dollar. The border eventually reopened in July 2005. Mitchell subsequently established a beef and cattle advisory group to assist the government on export policy.

Mitchell withdrew the government's support for a conference promoting agricultural exports to Iran in April 2005, following revelations that Canadian journalist Zahra Kazemi had died from torture in an Iranian prison two years earlier.

In early 2005, the National Farmers Union (NFU) charged that proposed federal legislation would make it difficult for independent farmers to retain seeds from one year to the next and that the government was abandoning its commitment to public plant breeding by closing four experimental research farms. The NFU further argued that these changes would benefit large companies like Monsanto over Canadian farmers. A representative for Mitchell responded that the government would protect the right of farmers to save their seeds. In response to further criticism, Mitchell announced a moratorium on the farm closures in June 2005.

Mitchell spent part of the 2006 federal election participating in previously scheduled World Trade Organization talks in Hong Kong on agricultural subsidies. After extended negotiations, Mitchell and International Trade Minister Jim Peterson announced their support for a tentative deal that would end farm export subsidies while allowing the Canadian Wheat Board's operations to continue.

Mitchell lost to high-profile Conservative candidate Tony Clement by only twenty-eight votes in the 2006 election, as the Conservatives won a minority government nationally.

== After career ==
Mitchell served as chief of staff for official opposition leader Bill Graham in 2006. He later became executive director and chair of the Greater Peterborough Economic Development Corporation (GPAEDC), led a non-profit organization called the Greater Peterborough Innovation Cluster, and became an adjunct professor at Trent University.

Mitchell was elected as deputy reeve of Selwyn in the 2010 municipal elections. By virtue of holding this position, he also served on the Peterborough County Council. Mitchell also served as a Senior Policy Advisor to the Hon. Jeff Leal, MPP and Minister of Agriculture and Rural Affairs. He served until 2014.

Mitchell also served as campaign manager to the Maryam Monsef campaign in 2015 federal election in which Monsef won. He also worked as a professor at Trent University in the Political Studies department following his leaving federal politics.

On October 22, 2018 he won election to become mayor of Selwyn, Ontario

== Electoral record ==
Federal

2006 Canadian federal election: Parry Sound—Muskoka
Party	Candidate	Votes	%	±%	Expenditures
Conservative	Tony Clement	18,513	40.10	+3.75	$ 78,455.14
Liberal	Andy Mitchell	18,485	40.04	−3.82	76,877.80
New Democratic	Jo-Anne Boulding	5,472	11.85	+0.08	17,712.85
Green	Glen Hodgson	3,701	8.02	–	4,700.60
Total valid votes		46,171	100.0	+5.09	$ 80,177.85
Rejected, unmarked and declined ballots		147	0.32	+0.03	
Turnout		46,318	67.54	+3.51	
Electors on the lists		68,577		-0.35	
Conservative gain from Liberal		Swing		+3.78	
Source(s) "Official Voting Results — Thirty-Ninth General Election 2006 (Table 11)". Elections Canada. "Official Voting Results — Thirty-Ninth General Election 2006 (Table 12)". "Candidate's Electoral Campaign Return – Candidates' Summary (As reviewed by Election Canada)".

2004 Canadian federal election: Parry Sound—Muskoka
Party	Candidate	Votes	%	±%	Expenditures
Liberal	Andy Mitchell	19,271	43.86	−3.73	$73,114
Conservative	Keith Montgomery	15,970	36.35	−7.57	$64,246
New Democratic	Jo-Anne Boulding	5,171	11.77	+7.31	$10,914
Green	Glen Hodgson	3,524	8.02	+3.99	$4,271
Total valid votes		43,936	100.00		
Rejected, unmarked and declined ballots		126	0.29	−0.07	
Turnout		44,062	64.03	+5.33	
Electors on the lists		68,819			
Percentage change figures are factored for redistribution. Conservative Party percentages are contrasted with the combined Canadian Alliance and Progressive Conservative percentages from 2000.
Sources: Official Results, Elections Canada and Financial Returns, Elections Canada.

2000 Canadian federal election: Parry Sound—Muskoka
Party	Candidate	Votes	%	±%	Expenditures
Liberal	Andy Mitchell	17,911	47.52	+5.92	$50,894
Alliance	George Stripe	9,569	25.39	−0.17	$27,742
Progressive Conservative	Keith Montgomery	7,055	18.72	−8.07	$32,500
New Democratic	Joanne Bury	1,665	4.42	+0.44	$4,021
Green	Richard Thomas	1,495	3.97	+2.77	$1,893
Total valid votes		37,695	100.00		
Rejected, unmarked and declined ballots		134	0.35	+0.04	
Turnout		37,829	58.70	−10.41	
Electors on the lists		64,448			
Sources: Official Results, Elections Canada and Financial Returns, Elections Canada.

1997 Canadian federal election: Parry Sound—Muskoka
Party	Candidate	Votes	%	±%	Expenditures
Liberal	Andy Mitchell	17,752	41.60	−2.39	$50,060
Progressive Conservative	Lewis MacKenzie	11,435	26.79	+6.13	$57,680
Reform	Peter Spadzinski	10,909	25.56	−2.71	$37,010
New Democratic	Carl Wirth	1,700	3.98	−0.77	$9,543
Green	Glen Hodgson	513	1.20		$1,385
Canadian Action	Jackie Raney	236	0.55		$1,277
Natural Law	Rick Alexander	133	0.31		$0
Total valid votes		42,678	100.00		
Rejected, unmarked and declined ballots		135	0.32	−0.15	
Turnout		42,813	69.11	+0.01	
Electors on the lists		61,951			
Percentage change figures are factored for redistribution.
Sources: Official Results, Elections Canada and Financial Returns, Elections Canada.

1993 Canadian federal election: Parry Sound—Muskoka
Party	Candidate	Votes	%	±%	Expenditures
Liberal	Andy Mitchell	20,427	44.22	+13.13	$35,935
Reform	Jim Newman	13,022	28.19		$33,012
Progressive Conservative	Terry Clarke	9,529	20.63	−22.62	$47,594
New Democratic Party	Shirley Davy	2,164	4.68	−20.98	$22,828
National	John Marshall	581	1.26		$529
Natural Law	Russell Guest	263	0.57		$0
Independent	John Farr	181	0.39		$0
Abolitionist	Jim Journeau	26	0.06		$0
Total valid votes		46,193	100.00		
Rejected, unmarked and declined ballots		215	0.46	0.00	
Turnout		46,408	69.11	−0.63	
Electors on the lists		67,150			
Source: Thirty-fifth General Election, 1993: Official Voting Results, Published by the Chief Electoral Officer of Canada. Financial figures taken from official contributions and expenses provided by Elections Canada.

Municipal

2010 Smith-Ennismore-Lakefield municipal election: Deputy Reeve of Smith-Ennismore-Lakefield
Candidate	Votes	%
Andy Mitchell	4,207	57.92
Greg Braund	3,057	42.08
Total valid votes	7,264	100

Source: Official results, Township of Smith-Ennismore-Lakefield.
