= Stan Darling =

Canadian politician

Member of the Canadian Parliament for Parry Sound-Muskoka
- In office 1972–1993
- Preceded by: Gordon Aiken
- Succeeded by: Andy Mitchell

Personal details
- Born: July 16, 1911 Callander, Ontario, Canada
- Died: April 11, 2004 (aged 92)
- Party: Progressive Conservative

Stan Darling (July 16, 1911 – April 11, 2004) was a Canadian politician.

== History ==
Born in Callander, Ontario, Stan Darling moved to Burk's Falls and founded Stan Darling Insurance Inc. in 1938. He was elected to the Burk's Falls Village Council in 1942. He was a councillor for 4 years and reeve for 26 years.

In the 1953 federal election, he ran unsuccessfully as the Progressive Conservative candidate for the House of Commons of Canada in the riding of Parry Sound-Muskoka. He was elected in the 1972 federal election. He was re-elected five more times in 1974, 1979, 1980, 1984, and 1988.

His memoirs, The Darling diaries: Memoirs of a Political Career (Dundurn Press, ISBN 1-55002-253-9), written with Beth Slaney, was published in 1995.

In 2000, he received the Distinguished Service Award from the Canadian Association of Former Parliamentarians, awarded to a former parliamentarian "who has made an outstanding contribution to the country and its democratic institutions."
