= Philip Bernard Rynard =

Canadian politician

Member of Parliament for Simcoe East
- In office 1957–1968
- Preceded by: William Alfred Robinson
- Succeeded by: riding dissolved

Member of Parliament for Simcoe North
- In office 1968–1979
- Preceded by: Heber Smith
- Succeeded by: Doug Lewis

Personal details
- Born: 25 June 1897 Udora, Ontario
- Died: 20 November 1980 (aged 83) Orillia, Ontario
- Party: Progressive Conservative
- Profession: Physician, surgeon

Philip Bernard Rynard (25 June 1897 – 20 November 1980) was a Canadian physician, surgeon, and politician.

Born in Udora, Ontario, he received his medical education at Queen's University. He was a Medical Health Officer for the province of Ontario and practiced medicine in Orillia.

He first ran unsuccessfully for the House of Commons of Canada in the 1953 federal election for the riding of Simcoe East. A Progressive Conservative, he was elected in the 1957 election. He was re-elected in 1958, 1962, 1963, 1965, 1968, 1972, and 1974. He was the physician to Prime Minister John Diefenbaker.

Rynard suffered a stroke in February 1980. He died in Orillia that November.

== Archives ==
There is a Philip Bernard Rynard fonds at Library and Archives Canada. Archival reference number is R3303.

== Electoral record ==
1953 Canadian federal election: Simcoe East
| Party | Candidate | Votes |
|---|---|---|
| Liberal | William Alfred Robinson | 9,099 |
| Progressive Conservative | Philip Bernard Rynard | 8,944 |
| Co-operative Commonwealth | John Wilson Lovelace | 1,310 |
| Social Credit | Carl Clark Pinkney | 533 |

1957 Canadian federal election: Simcoe East
| Party | Candidate | Votes |
|---|---|---|
| Progressive Conservative | Philip Bernard Rynard | 12,497 |
| Liberal | William Alfred Robinson | 8,193 |
| Co-operative Commonwealth | William Arthur Winchester | 1,395 |
| Independent | Charles Parker | 726 |

1958 Canadian federal election: Simcoe East
| Party | Candidate | Votes |
|---|---|---|
| Progressive Conservative | Philip Bernard Rynard | 15,149 |
| Liberal | John R. MacIsaac | 7,403 |
| Co-operative Commonwealth | William A. Winchester | 1,423 |

1962 Canadian federal election: Simcoe East
| Party | Candidate | Votes |
|---|---|---|
| Progressive Conservative | Philip Bernard Rynard | 12,835 |
| Liberal | John R. MacIsaac | 8,688 |
| New Democratic | Ray A. Ruggles | 2,346 |
| Social Credit | A. J. Stann | 423 |

1963 Canadian federal election: Simcoe East
| Party | Candidate | Votes |
|---|---|---|
| Progressive Conservative | Philip Bernard Rynard | 12,662 |
| Liberal | Jerome J. Gignac | 9,324 |
| New Democratic | C. Perrie Rintoul | 2,031 |
| Social Credit | Bob Pinkney | 1,054 |

1965 Canadian federal election: Simcoe East
| Party | Candidate | Votes |
|---|---|---|
| Progressive Conservative | Philip Bernard Rynard | 11,648 |
| Liberal | Wilson Morden | 9,281 |
| New Democratic | C. Perrie Rintoul | 3,597 |
