= John Benjamin Johnston =

Canadian politician from Ontario

Member of the Ontario Provincial Parliament for Simcoe East
- In office October 20, 1919 – May 10, 1923
- Preceded by: James Irwin Hartt
- Succeeded by: William Finlayson

Personal details
- Party: United Farmers

John Benjamin Johnston was a Canadian politician from Ontario. He represented Simcoe East in the Legislative Assembly of Ontario from 1919 to 1923.

== See also ==
- 15th Parliament of Ontario
