= Hermon Henry Cook =

Canadian politician

Herman Henry Cook
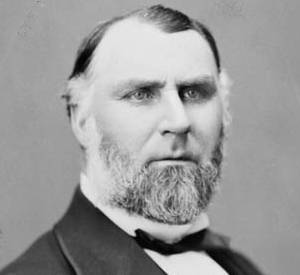

Member of Parliament for Simcoe East
- In office 1882–1891
- Preceded by: New riding
- Succeeded by: Philip Howard Spohn

Member of Parliament for Simcoe North
- In office 1872–1878
- Preceded by: Thomas David McConkey
- Succeeded by: Dalton McCarthy

Ontario MPP
- In office 1879–1882
- Preceded by: John Kean
- Succeeded by: Charles Alfred Drury
- Constituency: Simcoe East

Personal details
- Born: April 26, 1837 Dundas County, Upper Canada
- Died: April 12, 1914 (aged 76) Toronto, Ontario, Canada
- Party: Liberal
- Spouse: Lydia White (m. 1861)
- Occupation: Merchant

Hermon (Herman) Henry Cook (April 26, 1837 – April 12, 1914) was an Ontario lumber merchant and political figure. He represented Simcoe North in the House of Commons of Canada as a Liberal member from 1872 to 1878 and Simcoe East from 1882 to 1891. He also represented Simcoe East in the Legislative Assembly of Ontario as a Liberal member from 1879 to 1882.

== Life ==
He was born in Williamsburgh Township in Dundas County Upper Canada in 1826, the son of George Cook and Sarah Castleman, and was educated in Iroquois. He established himself as a lumber merchant in Simcoe County and set up a sawmill near the current site of the town of Midland, Ontario. With the completion of the Midland Railway of Canada, his timber business prospered. In 1861, he married Lydia White. He ran unsuccessfully for a seat in the Ontario assembly in 1871. Cook resigned his seat in the provincial assembly in 1882 to run for a federal seat. He died in Toronto at the age of 76.

== Relatives ==
His brother James William represented Dundas in the Legislative Assembly of the Province of Canada and his brother Simon represented Dundas in the House of Commons of Canada. His uncle John Cook had earlier represented Dundas in the legislative assembly for Upper Canada.

== Electoral record ==
1882 Canadian federal election: Simcoe East
Party	Candidate	Votes
Liberal	Hermon Henry Cook	1,468
Unknown	James Quinn	1,330

1887 Canadian federal election: Simcoe East
Party	Candidate	Votes
Liberal	Hermon Henry Cook	2,482
Unknown	James Quinn	2,408

1896 Canadian federal election: Simcoe East
Party	Candidate	Votes
Conservative	William Humphrey Bennett	2,775
Liberal	Hermon Henry Cook	2,539
Patrons of Industry	D. C. Anderson	1,197

By-election: On Mr. Bennett's election declared void, 4 February 1897: Simcoe East
Party	Candidate	Votes	%	±%
Conservative	William Humphrey Bennett	3,236		
Liberal	Hermon Henry Cook	3,111		
