= Parry Sound (federal electoral district) =

Former federal electoral district in Ontario, Canada

Ontario electoral district

Defunct federal electoral district
- Legislature: House of Commons
- District created: 1903
- District abolished: 1947
- First contested: 1904
- Last contested: 1945

Parry Sound was a federal electoral district represented in the House of Commons of Canada from 1904 to 1949. It was located in the province of Ontario. This riding was first created in 1903 from parts of Muskoka and Parry Sound riding.

It consisted of the territorial district of Parry Sound.

In 1933, it was expanded to include, in the territorial district of Nipissing, the townships of Ballantyne, Wilkes, Pentland, Boyd, Paxton, Biggar, Osler, Lister, Butt, Devine, Bishop, Freswick, McCraney, Hunter, McLaughlin, Bower, Finlayson, Peck, Canisbay and Sproule.

The electoral district was abolished in 1947 when it was merged into Parry Sound-Muskoka riding.

== Members of Parliament ==
This riding elected the following members of the House of Commons of Canada:

Parliament	Years	Member	Party
Riding created from Muskoka and Parry Sound
10th	1904–1908	Robert James Watson	Liberal
11th	1908–1911	James Arthurs	Conservative
12th	1911–1917	James Arthurs	Conservative
13th	1917–1921	James Arthurs	Government (Unionist)
14th	1921–1925	James Arthurs	Conservative
15th	1925–1926	James Arthurs	Conservative
16th	1926–1930	James Arthurs	Conservative
17th	1930–1935	James Arthurs	Conservative
18th	1935–1940	Arthur Slaght	Liberal
19th	1940–1945	Arthur Slaght	Liberal
20th	1945–1949	Wilfred McDonald	Liberal
Riding dissolved into Parry Sound-Muskoka

== Election results ==
1904 Canadian federal election: Parry Sound
Party	Candidate	Votes
Liberal	Robert James Watson	2,410
Conservative	James S. Freeborn	2,035

1908 Canadian federal election: Parry Sound
Party	Candidate	Votes
Conservative	James Arthurs	2,932
Liberal	Robert James Watson	2,135

1911 Canadian federal election: Parry Sound
Party	Candidate	Votes
Conservative	James Arthurs	2,976
Liberal	George Morrison	1,918

1917 Canadian federal election: Parry Sound
Party	Candidate	Votes
Government (Unionist)	James Arthurs	5,182
Opposition (Laurier Liberals)	Norman Cecil Hocken	2,043

1921 Canadian federal election: Parry Sound
Party	Candidate	Votes
Conservative	James Arthurs	3,229
Independent	William Robert Mason	3,157
Progressive	Augustus Wellington Partridge	2,784

1925 Canadian federal election: Parry Sound
Party	Candidate	Votes
Conservative	James Arthurs	5,224
Liberal	William Robert Mason	3,922

1926 Canadian federal election: Parry Sound
Party	Candidate	Votes
Conservative	James Arthurs	5,418
Liberal	James Ludgate	4,358

1930 Canadian federal election: Parry Sound
Party	Candidate	Votes
Conservative	James Arthurs	5,504
Liberal	Joseph Hilliar	4,365

1935 Canadian federal election: Parry Sound
Party	Candidate	Votes
Liberal	Arthur Slaght	6,230
Conservative	Milton Henry Limbert	3,965
Reconstruction	William Robert Mason	1,245

1940 Canadian federal election: Parry Sound
Party	Candidate	Votes
Liberal	Arthur Slaght	5,850
National Government	A. Coulter McLean	4,159
New Democracy (Canada)	Clarence E. Culbert	786

1945 Canadian federal election: Parry Sound
Party	Candidate	Votes
Liberal	Wilfred McDonald	5,301
Progressive Conservative	A. Coulter McLean	4,909
Co-operative Commonwealth	Earle Torrie Taylor	1,951

== See also ==
- List of Canadian electoral districts
- Historical federal electoral districts of Canada
