= John Kean (Canadian politician) =

Canadian politician (1820–1892)

Ontario MPP
- In office 1875–1879
- Preceded by: New riding
- Succeeded by: Herman Henry Cook
- Constituency: Simcoe East

Personal details
- Born: June 4, 1820 Bushmills, County Antrim, Ireland
- Died: May 31, 1892 (aged 71) Lethbridge, Alberta
- Party: Conservative
- Spouse: Mary Jordan (m. 1850)
- Occupation: Businessman

John Kean (June 4, 1820 – May 31, 1892) was an Irish-Canadian businessman and political figure. He represented Simcoe East in the Legislative Assembly of Ontario as a Conservative from 1875 to 1879.

He was born in Bushmills, County Antrim, Ireland in 1820 and, in 1832, came to Halton County in Upper Canada, where his parents had settled in 1824. He settled at Brantford, where he worked as a millwright, building sawmills and gristmills in the region. In 1850, he married Mary Jordan and the couple moved to Orillia in 1852. Kean served as reeve for the townships of Orillia and Matchedash from 1862 to 1869 and was warden of Simcoe County in 1868. In 1869, with partners, he built a large sawmill at the outlet of the Hogg River at Victoria Harbour.

In 1880, he was sent by the Canadian government to the Fort Macleod area of the North-West Territories (NWT), where he built a number of sawmills, including one on Pincher Creek. He later worked for the Canadian Pacific Railway. In 1883, Kean settled at Lethbridge, NWT, where he built a lumber mill and operated a number of businesses. He died there in 1892.

== Electoral history ==
1875 Ontario general election: Simcoe East
Party	Candidate	Votes	%
Conservative	John Kean	1,133	54.00
Liberal	H.M. Sutherland	965	46.00
Total valid votes		2,098	73.90
Eligible voters		2,839	
Conservative pickup new district.			
Source: Elections Ontario
