= James Brockett Tudhope =

Canadian politician (1858–1936)

Member of Parliament for Simcoe East
- In office 1917–1921
- Preceded by: William Humphrey Bennett
- Succeeded by: Thomas Edward Manley Chew

Ontario MPP
- In office 1902–1911
- Preceded by: Andrew Miscampbell
- Succeeded by: James Irwin Hartt
- Constituency: Simcoe East

Personal details
- Born: March 21, 1858 Oro Township, Canada West
- Died: February 3, 1936 (aged 77)
- Party: Liberal
- Occupation: Businessman

James Brockett Tudhope (March 21, 1858 – February 3, 1936) was a Canadian manufacturer and politician.

Tudhope was born in Oro Township, Canada West in 1858, the son of William Tudhope, a carriage manufacturer, and Mary Reid. In 1897, he formed the Tudhope Carriage Company in Orillia with his brothers. In 1902, with partner Harry Anderson, Tudhope established a company which manufactured agricultural implements. Following a fire at the carriage factory in 1909, he formed the Tudhope Motor Company which manufactured automobiles. Production was converted for military use during World War I and vehicle production was not resumed following the war. In 1928, a new company was formed that produced specialty metal products, such as electrical appliances. Following his death in 1936, his son took over the operation of the company.

Tudhope was elected to the Legislative Assembly of Ontario in 1902 for the provincial riding of Simcoe East. A Liberal, he was re-elected in 1905 and 1908. In 1917, he was elected to the House of Commons of Canada for the federal riding of Simcoe East.

Tudhope also served as reeve and mayor for Orillia. In 1966, he was inducted into the Orillia Hall of Fame.

== Legacy ==
The Tudhope Building, the former home of his auto company, later supplied military parts for two world wars, later used by Orillia Tudhope Anderson Company (OTACO) before shuttering the 1990. In 1995 it was used briefly as headquarters for the Ontario Provincial Police and now home to Orillia City Hall.

Tudhope Park (J.B. Tudhope Memorial Park), a 65 acre public park and beach, was donated by the Tudhopes to the town.
