= Garnet Edward Tanner =

Canadian Politician and Physician

Ontario MPP
- In office 1934–1937
- Preceded by: William Finlayson
- Succeeded by: William Finlayson
- Constituency: Simcoe East

Personal details
- Born: April 10, 1892 Sarnia, Ontario, Canada
- Died: November 4, 1955 (aged 63) Toronto, Ontario, Canada
- Party: Liberal
- Spouse: Jessie Lee Finch (m. 1916)
- Occupation: Physician

Garnet Edward Tanner (April 10, 1892 – November 4, 1955) was a physician and politician in Ontario, Canada. He represented Simcoe East in the Legislative Assembly of Ontario from 1934 to 1937 as a Liberal.

The son of Edward Charles Tanner and Hannah Hamil, he was born in Sarnia and was educated there and at Toronto University. In 1916, Tanner married Jessie Lee Finch. He served on the Water and Light Commission for Midland. Tanner was also president of the local Kiwanis club.

He died in Toronto General Hospital at the age of 63.
