= Wilfred McDonald =

Canadian hockey and lacrosse player, coach, and politician

Bucko McDonald
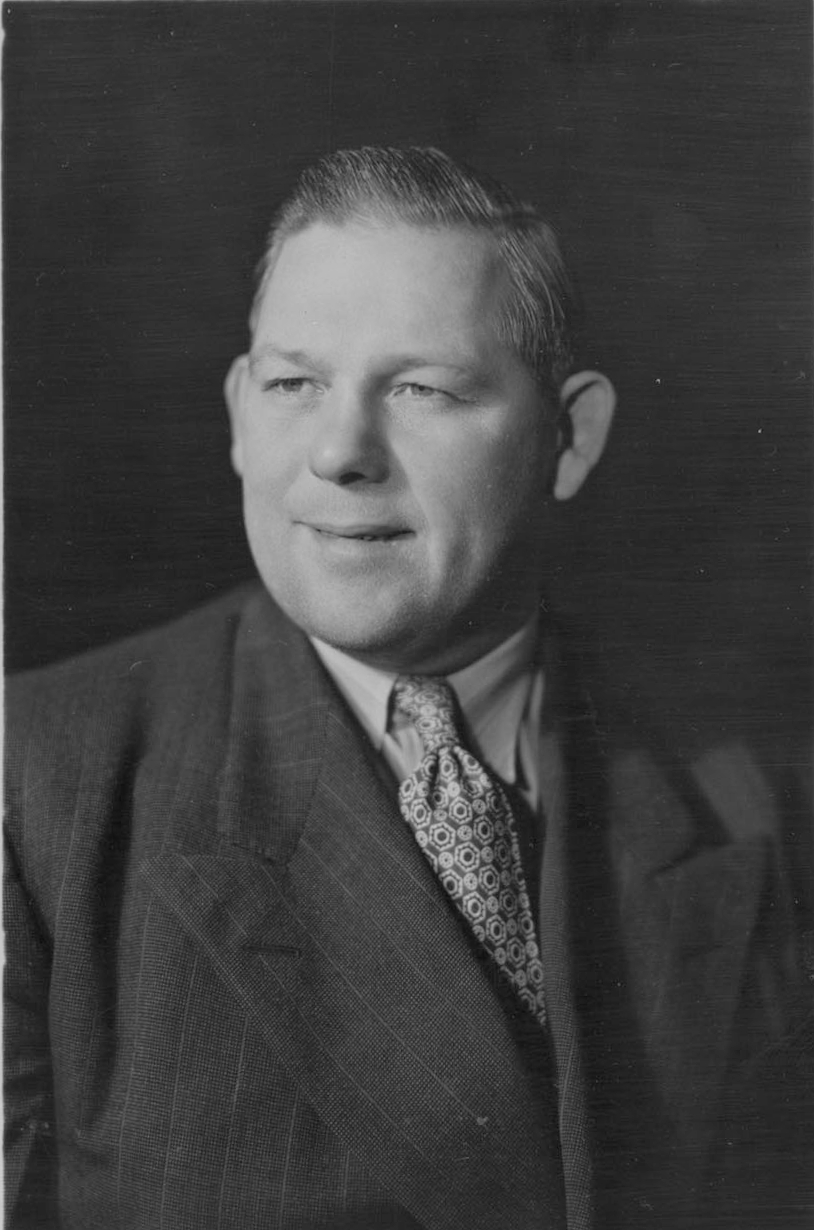
- McDonald pictured sometime between 1942-1948

Member of the Canadian Parliament for Parry Sound-Muskoka
- In office June 27, 1949 – June 9, 1957
- Preceded by: District was created in 1947
- Succeeded by: Gordon Aiken

Member of the Canadian Parliament for Parry Sound
- In office June 11, 1945 – June 26, 1949
- Preceded by: Arthur Slaght
- Succeeded by: District was abolished in 1947

Personal details
- Born: Wilfred Kennedy McDonald; October 31, 1911 Fergus, Ontario, Canada
- Died: July 19, 1991 (aged 79)
- Party: Liberal

Wilfred McDonald
- Born: Fergus, Ontario, Canada
- Height: 5 ft 10 in (178 cm)
- Weight: 205 lb (93 kg; 14 st 9 lb)
- Position: Defence
- Shot: Left
- Played for: Detroit Red Wings; New York Rangers; Toronto Maple Leafs
- Playing career: 1933–1949

Wilfred Kennedy "Bucko" McDonald (October 31, 1911 – July 19, 1991) was a Canadian professional hockey and lacrosse player, coach, and politician.

Born in Fergus, Ontario, he played for the Detroit Red Wings, Toronto Maple Leafs, and New York Rangers between 1935 and 1945. He won the Stanley Cup three times in his career, in 1936 and 1937 with Detroit and in 1942 with Toronto.

McDonald was also a lacrosse player, who won a Mann Cup and was inducted into the Canadian Lacrosse Hall of Fame in 1971. The Ontario Lacrosse Association honoured McDonald by naming an award after him; the highest-scoring player is awarded the Bucko McDonald Trophy.

In 1945, he was elected to the House of Commons of Canada in the Ontario riding of Parry Sound. A Liberal, he was re-elected in 1949 and 1953. After leaving politics, he was the head coach for the Rochester Americans. He coached Bobby Orr when he was 11 and 12.

== Career statistics ==
=== Regular season and playoffs ===
			Regular season					Playoffs
Season	Team	League	GP	G	A	Pts	PIM	GP	G	A	Pts	PIM
1933–34	Buffalo Bisons	IHL	41	3	1	4	14	6	1	0	1	0
1934–35	Buffalo Bisons	IHL	20	3	2	5	20	—	—	—	—	—
1934–35	Detroit Red Wings	NHL	15	1	2	3	8	—	—	—	—	—
1934–35	Detroit Olympics	IHL	12	3	1	4	8	—	—	—	—	—
1935–36	Detroit Red Wings	NHL	47	4	6	10	32	7	3	0	3	10
1935–36	Detroit Olympics	IHL	1	0	0	0	0	—	—	—	—	—
1936–37	Detroit Red Wings	NHL	47	3	5	8	20	10	0	0	0	2
1937–38	Detroit Red Wings	NHL	47	3	7	10	14	—	—	—	—	—
1938–39	Detroit Red Wings	NHL	14	0	0	0	2	—	—	—	—	—
1938–39	Toronto Maple Leafs	NHL	33	3	3	6	20	10	0	0	0	4
1939–40	Toronto Maple Leafs	NHL	34	2	5	7	13	1	0	0	0	0
1940–41	Toronto Maple Leafs	NHL	31	6	11	17	12	7	2	0	2	2
1940–41	Providence Reds	AHL	17	3	4	7	26	—	—	—	—	—
1941–42	Toronto Maple Leafs	NHL	48	2	19	21	24	9	0	1	1	2
1942–43	Toronto Maple Leafs	NHL	40	2	11	13	39	6	1	0	1	4
1942–43	Providence Reds	AHL	9	0	5	5	2	—	—	—	—	—
1943–44	Toronto Maple Leafs	NHL	9	2	4	6	8	—	—	—	—	—
1943–44	New York Rangers	NHL	41	5	6	11	14	—	—	—	—	—
1944–45	New York Rangers	NHL	40	2	9	11	0	—	—	—	—	—
1945–46	Hull Volants	QSHL	39	13	15	28	6	—	—	—	—	—
1946–47	Sundridge Beavers	NBHL	—	—	—	—	—	—	—	—	—	—
1947–48	Sundridge Beavers	NBHL	16	20	21	41	—	3	2	2	4	4
1948–49	Sundridge Beavers	NBHL	22	21	16	37	4	3	4	1	5	6
NHL totals			446	35	88	123	206	50	6	1	7	24
