= William Alfred Robinson (Canadian politician) =

Canadian politician

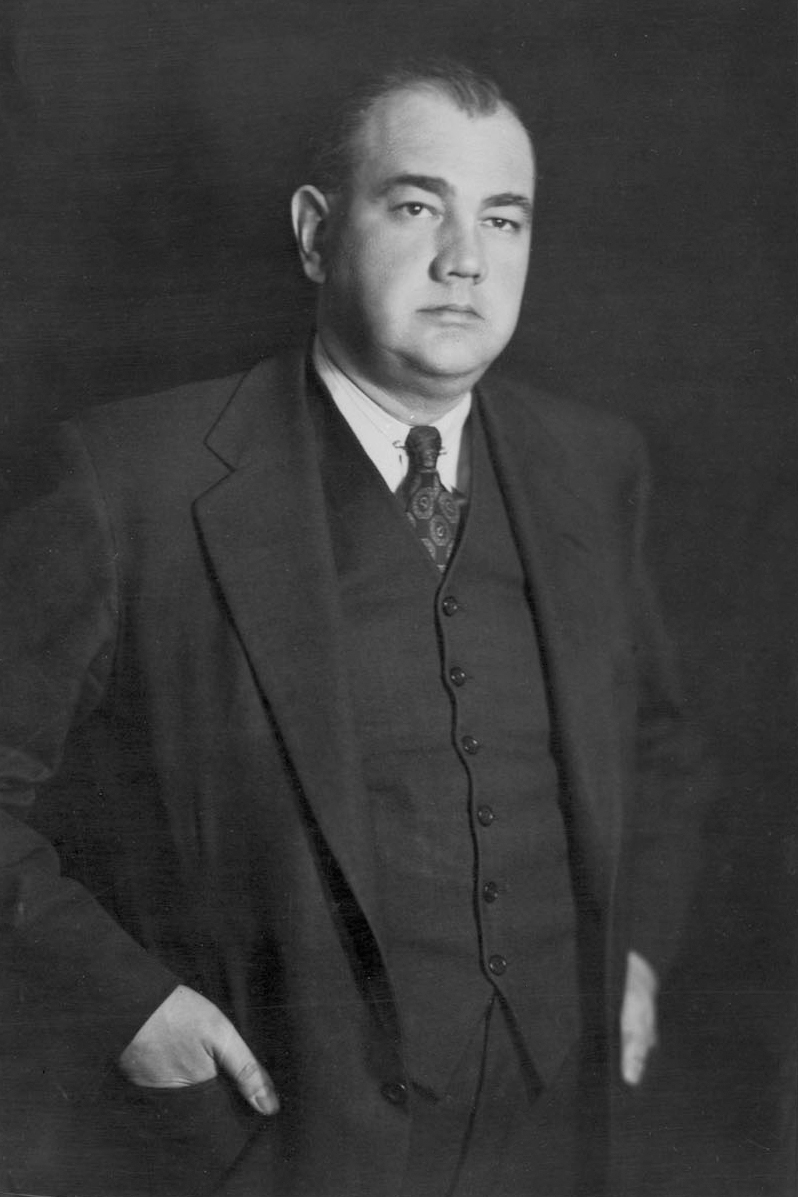

Mayor of Midland, Ontario
- In office 1945–1945

Member of Parliament for Simcoe East
- In office June 1945 – June 1957
- Preceded by: George McLean
- Succeeded by: Philip Bernard Rynard

Personal details
- Born: 12 July 1905 Penetanguishene, Ontario
- Died: 15 November 1957 (aged 52)
- Party: Liberal
- Spouse(s): Berenice Letherby (Sept 1942 - Oct 1949, her death)
- Profession: barrister

William Alfred Robinson (12 July 1905 – 15 November 1957) was a Liberal party member of the House of Commons of Canada. He was born in Penetanguishene, Ontario.

He studied in Toronto at Upper Canada College and the University of Toronto after which he became a barrister. Robinson became Mayor of Midland, Ontario in 1945.

Robinson was first elected to Parliament at the Simcoe East riding in the 1945 general election then re-elected for successive terms in 1949 and 1953. He was Deputy Speaker of the House of Commons during the 22nd Canadian Parliament from 1953 to 1957, and also served as Chairman of the Committees of the Whole. After this term of office, Robinson was defeated by Philip Bernard Rynard of the Progressive Conservative party in the 1957 election.

== Electoral record ==
1949 Canadian federal election: Simcoe East
Party	Candidate	Votes
Liberal	William Alfred Robinson	10,030
Progressive Conservative	John Elmer Wood	7,976
Co-operative Commonwealth	John Edward Skelton	2,095
Union of Electors	Marguerite Marchildon	404

1953 Canadian federal election: Simcoe East
Party	Candidate	Votes
Liberal	William Alfred Robinson	9,099
Progressive Conservative	Philip Bernard Rynard	8,944
Co-operative Commonwealth	John Wilson Lovelace	1,310
Social Credit	Carl Clark Pinkney	533

1957 Canadian federal election: Simcoe East
Party	Candidate	Votes
Progressive Conservative	Philip Bernard Rynard	12,497
Liberal	William Alfred Robinson	8,193
Co-operative Commonwealth	William Arthur Winchester	1,395
Independent	Charles Parker	726
