= Gordon Elsworth Smith =

Canadian politician

Gordon Smith

Ontario MPP
- In office 1967–1981
- Preceded by: Lloyd Letherby
- Succeeded by: Al McLean
- Constituency: Simcoe East

Personal details
- Born: November 5, 1918 South River, Ontario
- Died: June 9, 2005 (aged 86) Orillia, Ontario
- Party: Progressive Conservative
- Spouse: Jean Studiman
- Children: 3

Gordon Elsworth Smith (November 5, 1918 – June 9, 2005) was a politician in Ontario, Canada. He was a Progressive Conservative member of the Legislative Assembly of Ontario from 1967 to 1981 who represented the central Ontario riding of Simcoe East.

== Background ==
Smith was an active member of the Masonic Lodge from 1947, serving as District Deputy Grand Master, at Twin Lakes Lodge, Orillia, in 1966.

== Politics ==
After winning the elections in 1967, 1971, 1975, and 1977, he served in the 28th, 29th, 30th and 31st Legislative Assemblies in Ontario. He retired from politics in 1981.
