= 2010 Peterborough County municipal elections =

Local election in Ontario, Canada

Elections were held in Peterborough County, Ontario on October 25, 2010 in conjunction with municipal elections across the province.

== Peterborough County Council ==
Position	Elected
Asphodel-Norwood Reeve	Doug Pearcy
Asphodel-Norwood Deputy Reeve	Joseph Crowley
Cavan Monaghan Reeve	John Fallis
Cavan Monaghan Deputy Reeve	Scott McFadden
Douro-Dummer Reeve	J. Murray Jones
Douro-Dummer Deputy Reeve	Karl Moher
Galway-Cavendish and Harvey Reeve	Janet Clarkson
Galway-Cavendish and Harvey Deputy Reeve	Ron Windover
Havelock-Belmont-Methuen Reeve	Ronald Gerow
Havelock-Belmont-Methuen Deputy Reeve	Andy Sharpe
North Kawartha Reeve	Jim Whelan
North Kawartha Deputy Reeve	Barry Rand
Otonabee-South Monaghan Reeve	David P. Nelson
Otonabee-South Monaghan Deputy Reeve	Joe Taylor
Smith-Ennismore-Lakefield Reeve	Mary Smith
Smith-Ennismore-Lakefield Deputy Reeve	Andy Mitchell

== Asphodel-Norwood ==
Reeve Candidate	Vote	%
Doug Pearcy (X)	Acclaimed	

== Cavan-Monaghan ==
2010 Cavan-Monaghan election, Reeve of Cavan-Monaghan
Candidate	Total votes	% of total votes
John A. Fallis	1,856	58.46
(incumbent)Neal Cathcart	801	25.23
Dave Williams	401	12.63
James A. Lunn	117	3.69
Total valid votes	3,175	100.00

2010 Cavan-Monaghan election, Deputy Reeve of Cavan-Monaghan
Candidate	Total votes	% of total votes
Scott McFadden	2,263	71.34
(incumbent)Brian Fallis	646	20.37
Ben D. Olan	263	8.29
Total valid votes	3,172	100.00

2010 Cavan-Monaghan election, Councillor, Cavan Ward
Candidate	Total votes	% of total votes
(incumbent)Jim C. Chaplin	862	41.64
Andy Harjula	749	36.18
Ryan D. Moore	369	17.83
Mark S. Ashby	90	4.35
Total valid votes	2,070	100.00

2010 Cavan-Monaghan election, Councillor, Millbrook Ward
Candidate	Total votes	% of total votes
Lynda K. Todd	237	35.32
David Franco	236	35.17
(incumbent)Fern Armstrong	151	22.50
Dan J. Smith	47	7.00
Total valid votes	671	100.00

2010 Cavan-Monaghan election, Councillor, Millbrook Ward
Candidate	Total votes	% of total votes
Tim Belch	224	54.50
(incumbent)Brian Bartlett	187	45.50
Total valid votes	411	100.00

Source: Official Results, Cavan-Monaghan.

== Douro-Dummer ==
Reeve Candidate	Vote	%
J. Murray Jones (X)	Acclaimed	

== Galway-Cavendish and Harvey ==
Reeve Candidate	Vote	%
Janet Clarkson	2,247	
Marie Windover	1,409	
John Sehovic	576	

== Havelock-Belmont-Methuen ==
Reeve Candidate	Vote	%
Roland Gerow (X)	Acclaimed	

== North Kawartha ==
Reeve Candidate	Vote	%
Jim Whelan (X)	Acclaimed	

== Otonabee-South Monaghan ==
2010 Otonabee-South Monaghan election, Reeve of Otonabee-South Monaghan
Candidate	Total votes	% of total votes
(incumbent)David P. Nelson	1,970	74.73
Tony Kenny	666	25.27
Total valid votes	2,636	100.00

2010 Otonabee-South Monaghan election, Deputy Reeve of Otonabee-South Monaghan
Candidate	Total votes	% of total votes
Joe Taylor	1,925	72.61
Terry Guiel	726	27.39
Total valid votes	2,651	100.00

2010 Otonabee-South Monaghan election, Councillor at large
Candidate	Total votes	% of total votes
Steve St. Jean	accl.	.

2010 Otonabee-South Monaghan election, Councillor, Otonabee Ward
Candidate	Total votes	% of total votes
Marion Burton	1,428	67.84
Jenny Pink	677	32.16
Total valid votes	2,105	100.00

2010 Otonabee-South Monaghan election, Councillor, South Monaghan Ward
Candidate	Total votes	% of total votes
(incumbent)Dennis Hannah	356	64.73
Thomas Doust	194	35.27
Total valid votes	550	100.00

Source: Official Election results, Township of Otonabee-South Monaghan

== Smith-Ennismore-Lakefield ==
2010 Smith-Ennismore-Lakefield election, Reeve of Smith-Ennismore-Lakefield
Candidate	Total votes	% of total votes
Mary Smith	4,423	59.04
(incumbent)Ron Millen	3,068	40.96
Total valid votes	7,491	100.00

2010 Smith-Ennismore-Lakefield municipal election: Deputy Reeve of Smith-Ennismore-Lakefield
Candidate	Votes	%
Andy Mitchell	4,207	57.92
Greg Braund	3,057	42.08
Total valid votes	7,264	100

2010 Smith-Ennismore-Lakefield election, Councillor, Ennismore
Candidate	Total votes	% of total votes
(incumbent)Donna Ballantyne	1,605	73.79
Leon Jegeris	296	13.61
Carl Mabee	274	12.60
Total valid votes	2,175	100.00

2010 Smith-Ennismore-Lakefield election, Councillor, Smith
Candidate	Total votes	% of total votes
(incumbent)Sherry Senis	2,578	66.05
Craig Read	1,325	33.95
Total valid votes	3,903	100.00

2010 Smith-Ennismore-Lakefield election, Councillor, Lakefield
Candidate	Total votes	% of total votes
(incumbent)Anita Locke	accl.	.

Source: Official results, Township of Smith-Ennismore-Lakefield.
