= Robert James Watson =

Canadian politician

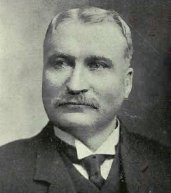

Member of the Canadian Parliament for Parry Sound
- In office 1904–1908
- Preceded by: District was created in 1903
- Succeeded by: James Arthurs

Personal details
- Born: February 23, 1846 Saint John, New Brunswick
- Died: October 16, 1931 (aged 85)
- Party: Liberal

Robert James Watson (February 23, 1846 – October 16, 1931) was a Canadian politician.

Born in Saint John, New Brunswick, he was educated at a Public School and Hamilton University. A farmer, he ran unsuccessfully in the Ontario riding of Muskoka and Parry Sound for the House of Commons of Canada in 1900. He was elected in the 1904 election for the riding of Parry Sound. A Liberal, he was defeated in 1908.

A Presbyterian, he married Carrie Schoby on April 23, 1878.
