= Andrew Miscampbell =

Canadian politician (1848–1905)

Ontario MPP
- In office 1890–1902
- Preceded by: Charles Alfred Drury
- Succeeded by: James Brockett Tudhope
- Constituency: Simcoe East

Personal details
- Born: June 28, 1848 Simcoe County, Canada West
- Died: March 25, 1905 (aged 56) Toronto, Ontario
- Party: Conservative
- Spouse: Jessie Spooner (m. 1874)

Andrew Miscampbell (June 28, 1848 – March 25, 1905) was an Ontario political figure. He represented Simcoe East from 1890 to 1902 and Sault Ste. Marie from 1902 to 1903 as a Conservative member of the Legislative Assembly of Ontario.

== Career ==
He began work as a bookkeeper at Bell Ewart, Ontario in 1872. In 1873 he moved to Midland, Ontario to become a bookkeeper at Hermon Henry Cook's sawmill. Later when Cook's British Canadian Lumber Company failed in 1882, Andrew became manager of Richard Power's Victoria Harbour saw mills. In 1886 Miscampbell returned to Midland to operate H. H. Cook's former mill on his own account. In the same year, R. A. Loveland of the Emery Lumber Co. of East Saginaw, Michigan, arranged to have that firm's Georgian Bay logs manufactured into lumber at Miscampbell's mill. He sold the mill to the Emery Lumber Co. of Michigan in 1891.

== Personal life ==
He was born in Simcoe County, Canada West in 1848, the son of Irish immigrants, and educated in Barrie. From 1864 to 1866 he was drill instructor of the volunteers of Simcoe and he was engaged in the Fenian repulse as sergeant-major of the provisional battalion of the companies from the north put together in Toronto. In 1874, he married Jessie Spooner.

He died in Toronto in 1905 of typhoid fever and was buried in Barrie.

Miscampbell was godfather to Ontario premier Leslie Frost.
