= Charles Alfred Drury =

Canadian politician

Ontario MPP
- In office 1882–1890
- Preceded by: Herman Henry Cook
- Succeeded by: Andrew Miscampbell
- Constituency: Simcoe East

Personal details
- Born: September 4, 1844 Simcoe, Canada West
- Died: January 12, 1905 (aged 60) Barrie, Ontario
- Party: Liberal
- Spouses: Mary Ann Elizabeth Varley (m. 1877; died 1878) Isabella Brownlee (m. 1889)
- Relations: Ernest Charles Drury, son
- Occupation: Farmer

Charles Alfred Drury (September 4, 1844 – January 12, 1905) was an Ontario farmer and political figure. He represented Simcoe East in the Legislative Assembly of Ontario as a Liberal member from 1882 to 1890.

He was born on a farm near Barrie in Canada West in 1844.

== Family background ==
He married Mary Ann Elizabeth Varley in 1877. In 1889, he married Isabella Brownlee following the death of his first wife. His son, Ernest Charles Drury, went on to become Premier of Ontario.

== Political career ==
Drury served as reeve for Oro Township from 1877 to 1889. He ran unsuccessfully in Simcoe North for a seat in the House of Commons in the 1882 federal election but was elected to the Ontario Legislature in a by-election later that year.

He was named sheriff for Simcoe County in 1894.

=== Agricultural interests ===
He was also a member of the council of the Agricultural and Arts Association of Ontario and served as its president in 1882. Drury served as Commissioner of Agriculture in the provincial cabinet from 1888 to 1890; and was effectively the province's first Minister of Agriculture. During his time in office, he helped promote the development of the Ontario Agricultural College and model farm at Guelph.

== Death ==
He died in Barrie in 1905 after falling into a diabetic coma.
