= James Arthurs =

Canadian politician

The Honourable James Arthurs

Member of Parliament for Parry Sound
- In office 1908–1935
- Preceded by: Robert James Watson
- Succeeded by: Arthur Slaght

Canadian Senator from Ontario
- In office 20 July 1935 – 7 October 1937
- Appointed by: R. B. Bennett

Personal details
- Born: 4 October 1866 Toronto, Canada West
- Died: 7 October 1937 (aged 71) Leaside, Ontario, Canada
- Party: Conservative
- Spouse: Elizabeth Priscilla Gillespie (m. 1887)
- Children: 6

James Arthurs (4 October 1866 – 7 October 1937) was a politician. He represented the province of Ontario in the House of Commons of Canada and the Senate of Canada as a Conservative.

== Background ==
Arthurs attended public school and Hamilton Collegiate Institute, then became a hardware merchant.

He became a member of the House of Commons of Canada for Parry Sound electoral district from 1908 until 1935. Arthurs was then appointed to the Senate of Canada on 20 July 1935 by R.B. Bennett and remained in that office until his death.

The Commanda General Store in Gurd (now in Nipissing Township) was built and occupied by Arthurs about 1885. It was strategically located on the Rosseau-Nipissing Colonization Road. An Ontario Historical Plaque was erected by the province to commemorate The Commanda General Store's role in Ontario's heritage.

Arthurs also established the 162 Infantry Battalion of the Canadian Expeditionary Force (known as the First Nipissing Regiment). He then served with the 1st Battalion in France until May 1917, attaining a rank of lieutenant colonel.

On 4 October 1937 Arthurs fell ill and died three days later at his home at 222 Bessborough Drive Leaside (now part of Toronto). He and his wife had moved there from Parry Sound in the previous month.
