= George McLean (Canadian politician) =

Canadian politician

Member of Parliament for Simcoe East
- In office October 1935 – April 1945
- Preceded by: Alfred Burke Thompson
- Succeeded by: William Alfred Robinson

Personal details
- Born: George Alexander McLean; 23 May 1885 Mara Township, Ontario
- Died: 31 October 1975 (aged 90) Orillia, Ontario
- Party: Liberal
- Spouse(s): Edith Newport m. 24 September 1919
- Profession: Insurance agent, real estate broker

George Alexander McLean (23 May 1885 – 31 October 1975) was a Liberal party member of the House of Commons of Canada. He was born in Mara Township, Ontario, and became an insurance agent and real estate broker by career.

McLean attended Orillia Collegiate, then attained a Bachelor of Arts at the University of Toronto. He served in World War I with the Canadian Expeditionary Force, 19th Battalion. He also served with the 21st Battalion (2nd Tyneside Scottish), Northumberland Fusiliers, achieving the rank of captain. In 1917, he sustained major injuries in battle.

From 1921 to 1924, McLean was a municipal councillor of Orillia, and from then the city's mayor until 1925.

He was first elected to Parliament at the Simcoe East riding in the 1935 general election after an unsuccessful campaign there in 1930. He was re-elected in 1940 and served a full second term and left federal politics at the 1945 election.

He died at Soldier's Memorial Hospital in Orillia in 1975.

1930 Canadian federal election: Simcoe East
Party	Candidate	Votes
Conservative	Alfred Burke Thompson	7,974
Liberal	George McLean	7,629

1935 Canadian federal election: Simcoe East
Party	Candidate	Votes
Liberal	George McLean	8,219
Conservative	John S. Drinkwater	5,529
Reconstruction	Wilbur Merton Cramp	1,222
Co-operative Commonwealth	Frank Tissington	1,191
Independent	Donald Athenies MacNab	123

1940 Canadian federal election: Simcoe East
Party	Candidate	Votes
Liberal	George McLean	8,470
National Government	Oliver Hereford Smith	7,024
