= Philip Howard Spohn =

Canadian politician

Philip Howard Spohn (1842 – November 14, 1918) was a Canadian physician and political figure in Ontario, Canada. He represented Simcoe East in the House of Commons of Canada in 1891 as a Liberal member.

He was born in Ancaster, Canada West, the son of Philip Spohn, of United Empire Loyalist descent. He received his M.D. from Victoria University. In 1878, Spohn married Editha Sarah Thompson. He was a member of the municipal council for Simcoe for ten years. Spohn defeated William Humphrey Bennett in the 1891 federal election; however, the election was declared invalid and Bennett won the 1892 by-election by acclamation.

== Electoral record ==
1891 Canadian federal election: Simcoe East
Party	Candidate	Votes
Liberal	Philip Howard Spohn	2,850
Conservative	William Humphrey Bennett	2,643
