= John Duncan McPhee =

Canadian politician

Ontario MPP
- In office 1943–1953
- Preceded by: George A. Drew
- Succeeded by: Lloyd Averall Letherby
- Constituency: Simcoe East

Personal details
- Born: June 21, 1894 Atherley, Mara township
- Died: December 2, 1953 (aged 59) Port McNicoll, Ontario
- Party: Progressive Conservative
- Spouse: Kathleen Robertson (m. 1915)
- Children: 1
- Occupation: Physician

John Duncan McPhee (June 21, 1894 – December 2, 1953) was a physician and politician in Ontario, Canada. He represented Simcoe East in the Legislative Assembly of Ontario from 1943 to 1953 as a Conservative.

The son of William Robert McPhee and Martha Hannah Hart, he was born in Atherley, Mara township and was educated in Orillia and at the University of Toronto. In 1915, McPhee married Kathleen Marie Robertson. He served as medical health officer, reeve, councillor and school board member.
