= William Humphrey Bennett =

Canadian politician

The Honourable William Humphrey Bennett KC
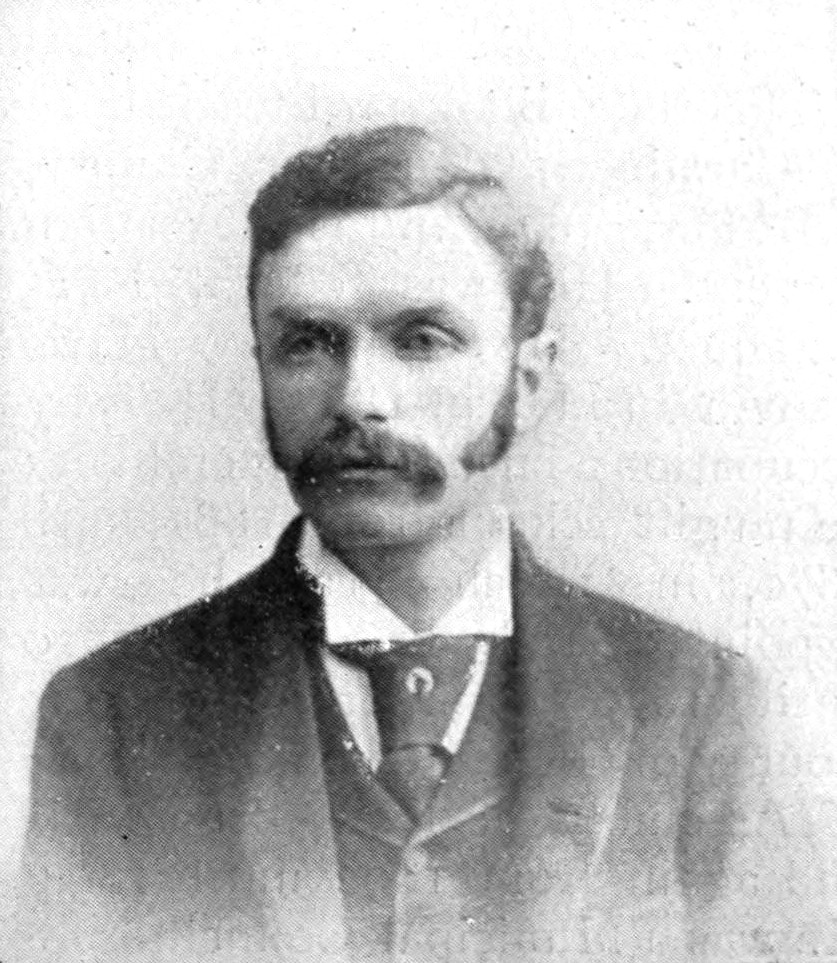

Member of Parliament for Simcoe East
- In office 1892–1908
- Preceded by: Philip Howard Spohn
- Succeeded by: Thomas Edward Manley Chew
- In office 1911–1917
- Preceded by: Thomas Edward Manley Chew
- Succeeded by: James Brockett Tudhope

Canadian Senator from Ontario
- In office 13 November 1917 – 15 March 1925
- Appointed by: Robert Borden

Personal details
- Born: 23 December 1859 Barrie, Canada West
- Died: 15 March 1925 (aged 65)
- Party: Conservative

William Humphrey Bennett, KC (23 December 1859 – 15 March 1925) was a Canadian politician.

== Biography ==
Born in Barrie, Canada West, the son of Humphrey Bennett and Anne A. Fraser, Bennett was educated at the Barrie Public and High Schools. After studying law he was called to the Bar of Ontario in 1881. Settling in Midland, Ontario, he was elected Reeve of Midland in 1886. He was a candidate for the House of Commons of Canada in the riding of Simcoe East in the 1891 federal election. He was defeated but after the election was declared void in 1891, he was acclaimed in the 1892 by-election. A Conservative, he was re-elected in 1896, 1900, and 1904. He was defeated in 1908. He was re-elected in the 1911 election. In 1917, he was summoned to the Senate of Canada on the advice of Robert Laird Borden representing the senatorial division of Simcoe East, Ontario. He served until his death in 1925. He married Margaret Cargill, daughter of Henry Cargill. He was an early mentor of George Dudley, who served as an articled clerk under Bennett.

== Electoral record ==
1896 Canadian federal election: Simcoe East
Party	Candidate	Votes
Conservative	William Humphrey Bennett	2,775
Liberal	Hermon Henry Cook	2,539
Patrons of Industry	D. C. Anderson	1,197

By-election: On Mr. Bennett's election declared void, 4 February 1897: Simcoe East
Party	Candidate	Votes	%	±%
Conservative	William Humphrey Bennett	3,236		
Liberal	Hermon Henry Cook	3,111		

1900 Canadian federal election: Simcoe East
Party	Candidate	Votes
Conservative	William Humphrey Bennett	3,486
Liberal	George Chew	3,447

1904 Canadian federal election: Simcoe East
Party	Candidate	Votes
Conservative	William Humphrey Bennett	3,116
Liberal	Ronald David Gunn	2,743

1908 Canadian federal election: Simcoe East
Party	Candidate	Votes
Liberal	Thomas Edward Manley Chew	3,417
Conservative	William Humphrey Bennett	3,153

1911 Canadian federal election: Simcoe East
Party	Candidate	Votes
Conservative	William Humphrey Bennett	3,315
Liberal	Thomas Edward Manley Chew	2,849
