= Parry Sound—Muskoka (federal electoral district) =

Federal electoral district in Ontario, Canada

Coordinates: 45.529°N 79.772°W

Ontario electoral district
- Interactive map of riding boundaries from the 2025 federal election

Federal electoral district
- Legislature: House of Commons
MP
Scott Aitchison
Conservative
- District created: 1947
- First contested: 1949
- Last contested: 2021
- District webpage: profile, map

Demographics
- Population (2021): 104,494
- Electors (2015): 74,977
- Area (km²): 14,402
- Pop. density (per km²): 7.3
- Census division(s): Parry Sound, Muskoka
- Census subdivision(s): Huntsville, Bracebridge, Gravenhurst, Muskoka Lakes, Parry Sound, Seguin, Lake of Bays, Georgian Bay, McDougall, Perry

Parry Sound—Muskoka is a federal electoral district in Ontario, Canada, that has been represented in the House of Commons of Canada since 1949.

The riding consists of the Territorial District of Parry Sound (excluding the Town of Powassan, the townships of Nipissing and North Himsworth, and the part of the Town of Killarney contained in the district), the District Municipality of Muskoka, and the part of the Town of Kearney lying in the Territorial District of Nipissing.

In 2004, Liberal Andy Mitchell was elected Member of Parliament for the district, and was the Minister of Agriculture. He was narrowly defeated in the 2006 election by Conservative Tony Clement, who was the President of the Treasury Board until November 4, 2015. In 2019, Conservative Scott Aitchison was elected.

== History ==
Parry Sound—Muskoka was created in 1947 from parts of Muskoka, Nipissing and Parry Sound ridings.

It consisted initially of the territorial districts of Parry Sound and Muskoka (excluding the township of Baxter), and the following townships in the territorial district of Nipissing: Ballantyne, Wilkes, Pentland, Boyd, Paxton, Biggar, Osler, Lister, Butt, Devine, Bishop, Freswick, McCraney, Hunter, McLaughlin, Bower, Finlayson, Peck, Canisbay and Sproule.

In 1966, it was redefined to consist of the territorial districts of Muskoka and Parry Sound, and Georgian Bay Islands National Park except Flower Pot Island.

In 1976, it was redefined to consist of the Territorial District of Parry Sound, the District Municipality of Muskoka, and the part of Territorial District of Nipissing lying south and west of and including the townships of Ballantyne, Boulter, Lauder, Boyd, Lister, Freswick, Bower and Sproule. In 1987, the Nipissing portions of the riding were removed.

In 1996, the riding was expanded to include the townships of Sherborne, McClintock, Livingstone, Lawrence and Nightingale in the County of Haliburton. The towns of Powassan and Trout Creek and the townships of Nipissing, North Himsworth and South Himsworth in the Territorial District of Parry Sound were excluded from the riding.

In 2003, it was given its current boundaries as described above. There were no changes after the 2012 electoral redistribution.

=== Members of Parliament ===
This riding has elected the following members of Parliament:

Parliament	Years	Member	Party
Parry Sound—Muskoka; Riding created from Muskoka, Nipissing and Parry Sound
21st	1949–1953	Wilfred McDonald	Liberal
22nd	1953–1957	Wilfred McDonald	Liberal
23rd	1957–1958	Gordon Aiken	Progressive Conservative
24th	1958–1962	Gordon Aiken	Progressive Conservative
25th	1962–1963	Gordon Aiken	Progressive Conservative
26th	1963–1965	Gordon Aiken	Progressive Conservative
27th	1965–1968	Gordon Aiken	Progressive Conservative
28th	1968–1972	Gordon Aiken	Progressive Conservative
29th	1972–1974	Stan Darling	Progressive Conservative
30th	1974–1979	Stan Darling	Progressive Conservative
31st	1979–1980	Stan Darling	Progressive Conservative
32nd	1980–1984	Stan Darling	Progressive Conservative
33rd	1984–1988	Stan Darling	Progressive Conservative
34th	1988–1993	Stan Darling	Progressive Conservative
35th	1993–1997	Andy Mitchell	Liberal
36th	1997–2000	Andy Mitchell	Liberal
37th	2000–2004	Andy Mitchell	Liberal
38th	2004–2006	Andy Mitchell	Liberal
39th	2006–2008	Tony Clement	Conservative
40th	2008–2011	Tony Clement	Conservative
41st	2011–2015	Tony Clement	Conservative
42nd	2015–2018	Tony Clement	Conservative
42nd	2018–2019	Tony Clement	Independent
43rd	2019–2021	Scott Aitchison	Conservative
44th	2021–2025	Scott Aitchison	Conservative
45th	2025–present	Scott Aitchison	Conservative

== Demographics ==
According to the 2021 Canadian census

Ethnic groups: 90.9% White, 6.6% Indigenous

Languages: 93.1% English, 1.2% French, 1.1% German

Religions: 52.8% Christian (14.2% Catholic, 10.5% United Church, 7.9% Anglican, 3.2% Presbyterian, 2.3% Baptist, 1.2% Pentecostal, 1.0% Lutheran, 12.5% Other), 45.3% None

Median income: $39,200 (2020)

Average income: $52,500 (2020)

== Election results ==
Graph of election results in Parry Sound—Muskoka (minor parties that never got 2% of the vote or didn't run consistently are omitted)

2025 Canadian federal election
Party	Candidate	Votes	%	±%	Expenditures
Conservative	Scott Aitchison	33,742	52.2	+4.27	
Liberal	Geordie Sabbagh	27,563	42.6	+21.1	
New Democratic	Heather Hay	2,300	3.6	–13.3	
People's	Isabel Pereira	1,048	1.6	–5.9	
Total valid votes/expense limit		64,653			
Total rejected ballots		353			
Turnout		65,006	71.43		
Eligible voters		91,006			
Source: Elections Canada

2021 federal election redistributed results
Party	Vote	%
Conservative	26,603	47.93
Liberal	12,015	21.65
New Democratic	9,340	16.83
People's	4,184	7.54
Green	3,099	5.58
Others	264	0.48

2021 Canadian federal election
Party	Candidate	Votes	%	±%	Expenditures
Conservative	Scott Aitchison	26,600	47.9	+6.1	$51,208.95
Liberal	Jovanie Nicoyishakiye	12,014	21.6	-8.8	$16,882.76
New Democratic	Heather Hay	9,339	16.8	+5.1	$7,768.65
People's	James Tole	4,184	7.5	N/A	$4,502.18
Green	Marc Mantha	3,099	5.6	-9.8	$17,519.77
Independent	Daniel Predie Jr	169	0.3	-0.4	$0.00
National Citizens Alliance	James Fawcett	95	0.2	–	$29.70
Total valid votes		55,500			
Total rejected ballots		299			
Turnout		55,799	65.01		
Eligible voters		85,831			
Source: Elections Canada

2019 Canadian federal election
Party	Candidate	Votes	%	±%	Expenditures
Conservative	Scott Aitchison	22,845	41.8	-1.50	$77,914.80
Liberal	Trisha Cowie	16,615	30.4	-8.48	$71,267.46
Green	Gord Miller	8,409	15.4	+8.18	$55,284.74
New Democratic	Tom Young	6,417	11.7	+1.59	none listed
Independent	Daniel Predie Jr	377	0.7	–	none listed
Total valid votes/expense limit		54,663	100.0		
Total rejected ballots		392			
Turnout		55,055	66.4		
Eligible voters		82,930			
Conservative hold		Swing		+3.49	
Source: Elections Canada

2015 Canadian federal election
Party	Candidate	Votes	%	±%	Expenditures
Conservative	Tony Clement	22,206	43.30	-12.43	$135,346.97
Liberal	Trisha Cowie	19,937	38.88	+27.40	$54,044.00
New Democratic	Matthew McCarthy	5,183	10.11	-14.06	$14,429.33
Green	Glen Hodgson	3,704	7.22	-0.92	$9,993.57
Pirate	Duncan Bell	121	0.24		–
Canadian Action	Gordie Merton	88	0.17		–
Marxist–Leninist	Albert Gray Smith	40	0.08	-0.04	–
Total valid votes/expense limit		51,279	100.00	+10.49	$221,183.08
Total rejected ballots		134	0.26	-0.03	
Turnout		51,413	67.96	+2.85	
Eligible voters		75,642		+4.43	
Conservative hold		Swing		-19.92	
Source(s) "Election Night Results – Parry Sound—Muskoka". Elections Canada. "Final Candidate Election Expenses Limits — 42nd General Election — October 19, 2015".

2011 Canadian federal election
Party	Candidate	Votes	%	±%	Expenditures
Conservative	Tony Clement	25,864	55.73	+5.55	$ 68,527.11
New Democratic	Wendy Wilson	11,217	24.17	+11.86	16.583.78
Liberal	Cindy Waters	5,330	11.48	-13.51	25,599.58
Green	Glen Hodgson	3,776	8.14	-3.63	12,055.16
Independent	David Carmichael	168	0.36		1,086.61
Marxist–Leninist	Albert Gray Smith	54	0.12		–
Total valid votes/expense limit		46,409	100.00	+6.68	$ 89,717.72
Total rejected ballots		133	0.29	+0.07	
Turnout		46,542	65.11	+2.40	
Eligible voters		71,477		+2.82	
Conservative hold		Swing		-3.16	
Source(s) "Official Voting Results — Forty-First General Election 2011 (Table 11)". Elections Canada. "Official Voting Results — Forty-First General Election 2011 (Table 12)". "Candidate's Electoral Campaign Return – Candidates' Summary (as reviewed by Elections Canada)".

2008 Canadian federal election
Party	Candidate	Votes	%	±%	Expenditures
Conservative	Tony Clement	21,831	50.19	+10.09	$ 85,379.18
Liberal	Jamie McGarvey	10,871	24.99	−15.05	53,208.34
New Democratic	Jo-Anne Boulding	5,355	12.31	+0.46	11,360.08
Green	Glen Hodgson	5,119	11.77	+3.75	9,469.06
Independent	David Rowland	325	0.75		620.00
Total valid votes/expense limit		43,501	100.0	-5.78	$ 86,569.39
Rejected, unmarked and declined ballots		93	0.21	−0.10	
Turnout		43,594	62.71	−4.83	
Electors on the lists		69,514		+1.37	
Conservative hold		Swing		+12.57	
Source(s) "Official Voting Results — Fortieth General Election 2008 (Table 11)". Elections Canada. "Official Voting Results — Fortieth General Election 2008 (Table 12)". "Candidate's Electoral Campaign Return – Candidates' Summary (As reviewed by Election Canada)".

2006 Canadian federal election
Party	Candidate	Votes	%	±%	Expenditures
Conservative	Tony Clement	18,513	40.10	+3.75	$ 78,455.14
Liberal	Andy Mitchell	18,485	40.04	−3.82	76,877.80
New Democratic	Jo-Anne Boulding	5,472	11.85	+0.08	17,712.85
Green	Glen Hodgson	3,701	8.02	–	4,700.60
Total valid votes		46,171	100.0	+5.09	$ 80,177.85
Rejected, unmarked and declined ballots		147	0.32	+0.03	
Turnout		46,318	67.54	+3.51	
Electors on the lists		68,577		-0.35	
Conservative gain from Liberal		Swing		+3.78	
Source(s) "Official Voting Results — Thirty-Ninth General Election 2006 (Table 11)". Elections Canada. "Official Voting Results — Thirty-Ninth General Election 2006 (Table 12)". "Candidate's Electoral Campaign Return – Candidates' Summary (As reviewed by Election Canada)".

2004 Canadian federal election
Party	Candidate	Votes	%	±%	Expenditures
Liberal	Andy Mitchell	19,271	43.86	−3.73	$73,114
Conservative	Keith Montgomery	15,970	36.35	−7.57	$64,246
New Democratic	Jo-Anne Boulding	5,171	11.77	+7.31	$10,914
Green	Glen Hodgson	3,524	8.02	+3.99	$4,271
Total valid votes		43,936	100.00		
Rejected, unmarked and declined ballots		126	0.29	−0.07	
Turnout		44,062	64.03	+5.33	
Electors on the lists		68,819			
Percentage change figures are factored for redistribution. Conservative Party percentages are contrasted with the combined Canadian Alliance and Progressive Conservative percentages from 2000.
Sources: Official Results, Elections Canada and Financial Returns, Elections Canada.

2000 Canadian federal election: Parry Sound—Muskoka
Party	Candidate	Votes	%	±%	Expenditures
Liberal	Andy Mitchell	17,911	47.52	+5.92	$50,894
Alliance	George Stripe	9,569	25.39	−0.17	$27,742
Progressive Conservative	Keith Montgomery	7,055	18.72	−8.07	$32,500
New Democratic	Joanne Bury	1,665	4.42	+0.44	$4,021
Green	Richard Thomas	1,495	3.97	+2.77	$1,893
Total valid votes		37,695	100.00		
Rejected, unmarked and declined ballots		134	0.35	+0.04	
Turnout		37,829	58.70	−10.41	
Electors on the lists		64,448			
Sources: Official Results, Elections Canada and Financial Returns, Elections Canada.

1997 Canadian federal election: Parry Sound—Muskoka
Party	Candidate	Votes	%	±%	Expenditures
Liberal	Andy Mitchell	17,752	41.60	−2.39	$50,060
Progressive Conservative	Lewis MacKenzie	11,435	26.79	+6.13	$57,680
Reform	Peter Spadzinski	10,909	25.56	−2.71	$37,010
New Democratic	Carl Wirth	1,700	3.98	−0.77	$9,543
Green	Glen Hodgson	513	1.20		$1,385
Canadian Action	Jackie Raney	236	0.55		$1,277
Natural Law	Rick Alexander	133	0.31		$0
Total valid votes		42,678	100.00		
Rejected, unmarked and declined ballots		135	0.32	−0.15	
Turnout		42,813	69.11	+0.01	
Electors on the lists		61,951			
Percentage change figures are factored for redistribution.
Sources: Official Results, Elections Canada and Financial Returns, Elections Canada.

1993 Canadian federal election: Parry Sound—Muskoka
Party	Candidate	Votes	%	±%	Expenditures
Liberal	Andy Mitchell	20,427	44.22	+13.13	$35,935
Reform	Jim Newman	13,022	28.19		$33,012
Progressive Conservative	Terry Clarke	9,529	20.63	−22.62	$47,594
New Democratic Party	Shirley Davy	2,164	4.68	−20.98	$22,828
National	John Marshall	581	1.26		$529
Natural Law	Russell Guest	263	0.57		$0
Independent	John Farr	181	0.39		$0
Abolitionist	Jim Journeau	26	0.06		$0
Total valid votes		46,193	100.00		
Rejected, unmarked and declined ballots		215	0.46	0.00	
Turnout		46,408	69.11	−0.63	
Electors on the lists		67,150			
Source: Thirty-fifth General Election, 1993: Official Voting Results, Published by the Chief Electoral Officer of Canada. Financial figures taken from official contributions and expenses provided by Elections Canada.

1988 Canadian federal election: Parry Sound—Muskoka
Party	Candidate	Votes	%	±%	Expenditures
Progressive Conservative	Stan Darling	17,232	43.25		$39,582
Liberal	Jamie McGarvey	12,386	31.09	–	$28,035
New Democratic	Joanne Malchuk	10,225	25.66		$47,108
Total valid votes		39,843	100.00		
Total rejected ballots		187	0.47		
Turnout		40,030	69.74		
Electors on the lists		57,396			
Source: Report of the Chief Electoral Officer, Thirty-fourth General Election, 1988.

1984 Canadian federal election
Party	Candidate	Votes	%	±%
Progressive Conservative	Stan Darling	22,739	57.2	+15.2
Liberal	Ed Fisher	9,555	24.1	-11.6
New Democratic	Dennis Hay	7,113	17.9	-4.4
Independent	John Kellock	316	0.8	
Total valid votes		39,723	100.0	

1980 Canadian federal election
Party	Candidate	Votes	%	±%
Progressive Conservative	Stan Darling	14,333	42.1	-10.5
Liberal	Ed Fisher	12,149	35.6	+5.4
New Democratic	Dennis Hay	7,603	22.3	+5.2
Total valid votes		34,085	100.0	

1979 Canadian federal election
Party	Candidate	Votes	%	±%
Progressive Conservative	Stan Darling	19,223	52.6	+8.3
Liberal	Ed Fisher	11,070	30.3	-6.0
New Democratic	Dennis Hay	6,270	17.1	-2.3
Total valid votes		36,563	100.0	

1974 Canadian federal election
Party	Candidate	Votes	%	±%
Progressive Conservative	Stan Darling	14,030	44.2	-3.2
Liberal	Ted Leslie	11,499	36.3	+6.9
New Democratic	Anne Malton	6,178	19.5	-3.7
Total valid votes		31,707	100.0	

1972 Canadian federal election
Party	Candidate	Votes	%	±%
Progressive Conservative	Stan Darling	14,297	47.5	-0.2
Liberal	Al Knapp	8,828	29.3	-8.8
New Democratic	Anne Malton	6,983	23.2	+9.1
Total valid votes		30,108	100.0	

1968 Canadian federal election
Party	Candidate	Votes	%	±%
Progressive Conservative	Gordon Harvey Aiken	12,045	47.7	-4.7
Liberal	Gerald M. Taylor	9,622	38.1	+7.3
New Democratic	Hugh A. Bishop	3,568	14.1	-2.7
Total valid votes		25,235	100.0	

1965 Canadian federal election
Party	Candidate	Votes	%	±%
Progressive Conservative	Gordon Harvey Aiken	11,777	52.4	+5.6
Liberal	Charles Barnett	6,922	30.8	-10.1
New Democratic	Hugh A. Bishop	3,773	16.8	+8.4
Total valid votes		22,472	100.0	

1963 Canadian federal election
Party	Candidate	Votes	%	±%
Progressive Conservative	Gordon Harvey Aiken	12,132	46.8	-4.5
Liberal	Gerald M. Taylor	10,598	40.9	+3.2
New Democratic	Ward Agnew	2,169	8.4	-2.6
Social Credit	Alex S. MacDonald	1,033	4.0	
Total valid votes		25,932	100.0	

1962 Canadian federal election
Party	Candidate	Votes	%	±%
Progressive Conservative	Gordon Harvey Aiken	13,135	51.3	-10.4
Liberal	Jim Jordan	9,646	37.7	+9.4
New Democratic	Hugh Bishop	2,817	11.0	+1.0
Total valid votes		25,598	100.0	

Note: NDP vote is compared to CCF vote in 1958 election.

1958 Canadian federal election
Party	Candidate	Votes	%	±%
Progressive Conservative	Gordon Harvey Aiken	14,888	61.7	+3.7
Liberal	Earl McDonald	6,833	28.3	-13.7
Co-operative Commonwealth	Hugh A. Bishop	2,414	10.0	
Total valid votes		24,135	100.0	

1957 Canadian federal election
Party	Candidate	Votes	%	±%
Progressive Conservative	Gordon Harvey Aiken	14,014	58.0	+13.9
Liberal	Gerald M. Taylor	10,161	42.0	-7.7
Total valid votes		24,175	100.0	

1953 Canadian federal election
Party	Candidate	Votes	%	±%
Liberal	Bucko McDonald	10,940	49.8	+1.3
Progressive Conservative	Stan Darling	9,690	44.1	+3.2
Co-operative Commonwealth	Edward John Lawrence	1,352	6.2	-4.4
Total valid votes		21,982	100.0	

1949 Canadian federal election
Party	Candidate	Votes	%
Liberal	Bucko McDonald	11,636	48.5
Progressive Conservative	James M. MacDonnell	9,816	40.9
Co-operative Commonwealth	Earle Torrie Taylor	2,535	10.6
Total valid votes		23,987	100.0

== See also ==
- List of Canadian electoral districts
- Historical federal electoral districts of Canada
