= Selwyn, Ontario =

Township in Ontario, Canada, founded 2001

Selwyn
- Township (lower-tier)
- Township of Selwyn
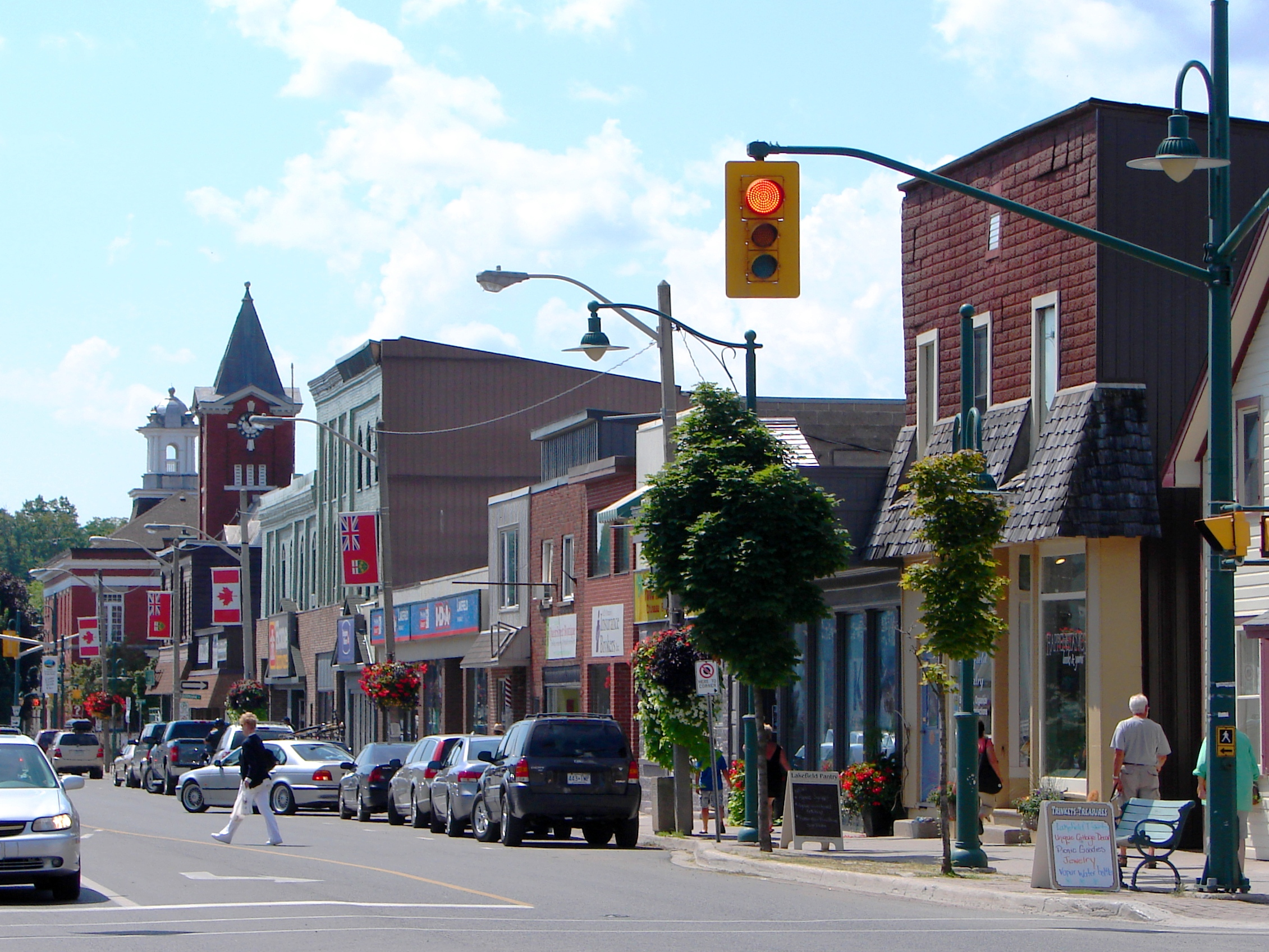
- Lakefield urban area in Selwyn Township

- Location within Peterborough County Location within Southern Ontario
- Coordinates: 44°25′N 78°20′W
- Country: Canada
- Province: Ontario
- County: Peterborough
- Settled: 1822
- Formed: January 1, 2001

Government
  - Type: Township
  - Mayor: Sherry Senis
  - Federal riding: Peterborough
  - Prov. riding: Peterborough—Kawartha

Area
  - Land: 316.12 km^{2} (122.05 sq mi)

Population (2021)
  - Total: 18,653
  - Density: 59/km^{2} (150/sq mi)
- Time zone: UTC-5 (EST)
  - Summer (DST): UTC-4 (EDT)
- Postal Code: K0L 2H0 / K0L 1H0 / K0L 1T0 / K9J 6X5
- Area codes: 705, 249, 683
- Website: www.selwyntownship.ca

Selwyn is a township in central-eastern Ontario, Canada, located in Peterborough County. The township comprises a mix of rural areas and built up urban areas (former independent towns and villages).

The township was created in 2001, as Smith-Ennismore-Lakefield, changing its name to Selwyn effective January 15, 2013. It is not to be confused with the hamlet of Selwyn, one of many unincorporated areas within the township.

== History ==
On January 1, 1998, Ennismore and Smith Townships were amalgamated to form the Township of Smith-Ennismore. On January 1, 2001, a Minister's Order created the current – larger – township by amalgamating the formerly independent Village of Lakefield with the Township of Smith-Ennismore and part of Douro–Dummer Township.

In December 2012, the township council voted to select a new name after Canada Post notified many residents that addresses would have to be changed to reflect the municipality due to a phasing out of its rural route system. The council chose to focus on a simpler name, reducing what it felt was confusion regarding the collective purpose – rather than a persistent notion of disparate parts – intended by the history of amalgamations. By a vote of 3 to 2, choosing from a slate of new names, the township council voted to adopt the new name of Selwyn, effective January 2013.

== Geography ==
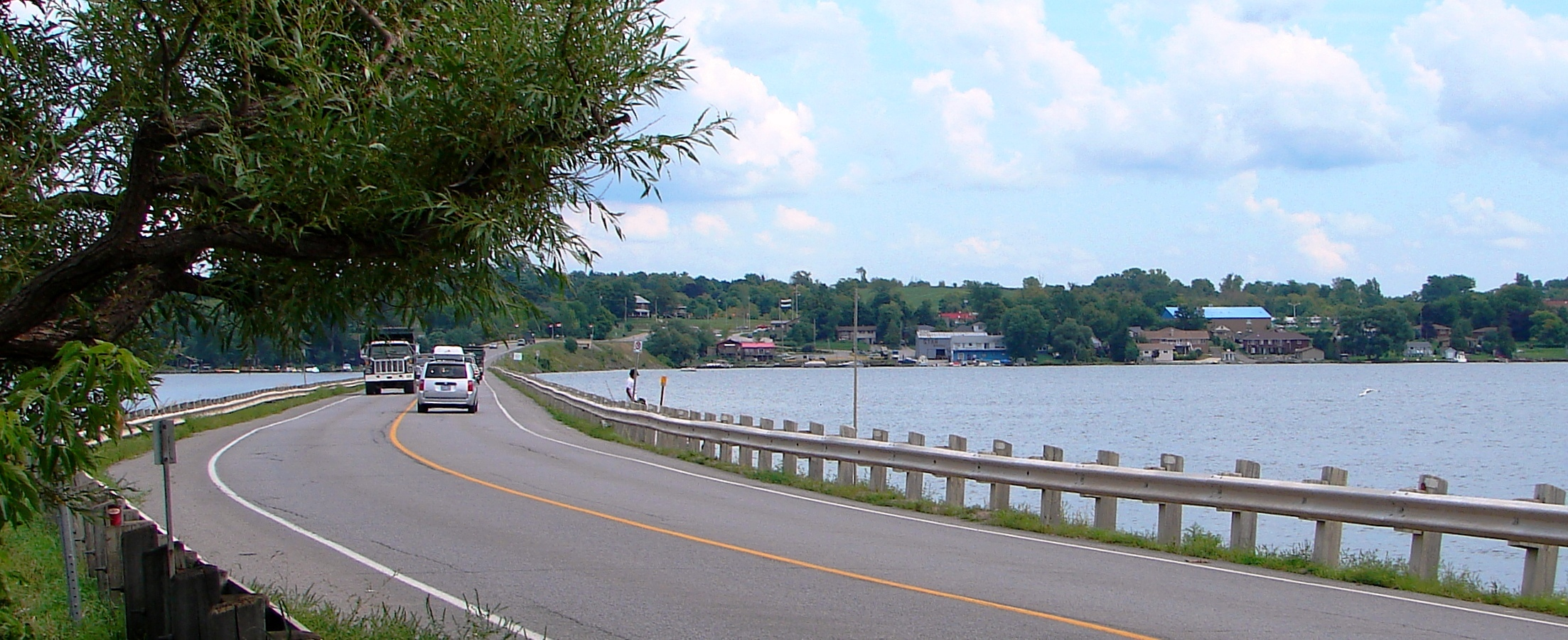
Chemong Lake with Bridgenorth urban area in background

The township comprises the communities of:

- Bridgenorth
- Buckhorn
- Chemong Heights
- Chemong Park
- Connaught Shore
- Deer Bay
- Emerald Isle
- Ennismore
- Fife's Bay
- Flood's Landing
- Fowlers Corners
- Gannon Beach
- Gannon Village
- Kawartha Park
- Kimberley Park
- Lakefield, Selwyn
- Selwyn Shores
- Stewart Heights
- Terra View Heights
- Tindle Bay
- Victoria Springs
- Village Meadows
- Windward Sands
- Woodland Acres
- Young's Cove
- Young's Point
- Youngstown

The township is 67 percent rural including small villages and hamlets, along with the urban areas of Lakefield, Bridgenorth - Chemong Park, and Woodland Acres (a suburb of Peterborough). Farms have been established on most of the flat areas, which are intermixed between the rolling hills and lakes. The Trent-Severn Waterway passes through the township.

== Demographics ==
In the 2021 Census of Population conducted by Statistics Canada, Selwyn had a population of 18,653 living in 7,483 of its 8,540 total private dwellings, a change of 9.3% from its 2016 population of 17,060. With a land area of 316.12 km^{2} (122.05 sq mi), it had a population density of 59.0/km^{2} (152.8/sq mi) in 2021.

Canada census – Selwyn, Ontario community profile

	2021	2016	2011
Population	18,653 (+9.3% from 2016)	17,060 (+1.3% from 2011)	16,846 (-1.1% from 2006)
Land area	316.12 km^{2} (122.05 sq mi)	315.69 km^{2} (121.89 sq mi)	315.64 km^{2} (121.87 sq mi)
Population density	59.0/km^{2} (153/sq mi)	54.0/km^{2} (140/sq mi)	53.4/km^{2} (138/sq mi)
Median age	52.0 (M: 51.2, F: 52.8)	51.4 (M: 51.0, F: 51.7)
Private dwellings	8,540 (total) 7,483 (occupied)	8,404 (total)	8,006 (total)
Median household income	$95,000	$79,349

References: 2021 2016 2011

Selwyn historical census populations

Year	Pop.	±%
1996	16,109	—
2001	16,414	+1.9%
2006	17,413	+6.1%

Year	Pop.	±%
2011	16,846	−3.3%
2016	17,060	+1.3%
2021	18,653	+9.3%

Source: Statistics Canada

Mother tongue (2021):

- English as first language: 94.5%
- French as first language: 0.8%
- English and French as first language: 0.4%
- Other as first language: 3.9%

== Economy ==
The region is in the heart of Ontario's eastern cottage country, where urban residents (mostly from the Toronto region) have cottages on many of the small lakes. Many of the retail and services offered in the region cater to this seasonal market.

Small scale farms are a main industry, and dairy and meat production are some of the notable goods.

== Government ==
In the 2010 municipal election, Mary Smith won the position of reeve (now mayor) from former reeve Ron Millen by 1,355 votes. Former federal Member of Parliament Andy Mitchell succeeded Smith as deputy reeve.

In the 2022 municipal elections, Sherry Senis was acclaimed mayor after serving as councillor. The previous mayor, Andy Mitchell, did not seek reelection.

== Education ==
Near the village is Lakefield College School which Prince Andrew (later Andrew Mountbatten-Windsor) attended in 1977, however was dropped as an honorary chairman due to sexual abuse allegations. In the village itself is the Lakefield District Public School, which opened in 2018 after the Ridpath Junior Public School, named after James William Ridpath, publisher in the late 19th century and early 20th century of the Lakefield News, local businessman, sportsman and dignitary, was closed. LDPS took over the building formerly used for the now closed Lakefield District Secondary School. St. Paul's Catholic School is situated nearby.

== Popular culture ==
In Paul Nicholas Mason's novel Battered Soles (2005), Lakefield is the site of a pilgrimage, begun in July 1997, which sees thousands of pilgrims from all over the world walk from Peterborough along the Rotary Greenway Trail to St. John's Anglican Church in the village. Mason's second novel, The Red Dress (2008), is also set in Lakefield, although this time the community is thinly-disguised as Greenfield.

=== In film ===
- Lakefield and Lakefield College School were used as the location for the 1977 Canadian film Age of Innocence. One memorable scene was shot at the location of the old Lakefield train station on Stanley St. The first four letters were removed on the Lakefield sign and replaced with the name Rockfield.
- In the winter of 2010 Verizon made a commercial at Lakefield's Ontario Speed Skating Oval outdoor speed skating rink.
- Unheralded (2011), a National Film Board documentary directed by Aaron Hancox, is about the Lakefield Herald. It focuses on this community paper's journalists as they cover newsworthy events taking place in and around the town.

== Notable people ==
- Charles Arkoll Boulton, former councillor and reeve, left Ontario and later became senator for Manitoba
- Sebastian Bach, rock singer, notable for being the lead singer of the band Skid Row
- Ronnie "The Hawk" Hawkins, American-born Canadian country musician
- Margaret Laurence, novelist
- Leahy Family, band
- Susanna Moodie, pioneer, writer and newspaper editor
- Paul Nicholas Mason, writer
- Paul Reddick, blues-rock artist, songwriter, and harp player
- Bruce Ridpath, professional ice hockey player who played on the 1911 Stanley Cup champion Ottawa Senators
- Catharine Parr Traill, English-born pioneer, writer, naturalist
- Mike Fisher, professional hockey player for the Nashville Predators, grew up in Bridgenorth
- Paul Soles, Canadian actor, television personality and voice actor famous for being the voice of Hermey in Rudolph the Red-nosed Reindeer and Spider-man in the 1960s
- Thomas Toth, Canadian runner
- Tyler Ardron, Canadian international rugby player, Super Rugby player (Waikato Chiefs), ITM Cup player (Bay of Plenty)
- Trevor Jones, Canadian rower

== See also ==
- List of townships in Ontario
