= Paul Wessenger =

Canadian politician

Ontario MPP
- In office 1990–1995
- Preceded by: Bruce Owen
- Succeeded by: Joe Tascona
- Constituency: Simcoe Centre

Personal details
- Born: December 25, 1937 (age 88) Brockville, Ontario, Canada
- Party: New Democrat
- Education: University of Toronto
- Occupation: Lawyer

Paul Wessenger (born December 25, 1937) is a former Canadian politician in Ontario. He was a New Democratic Party member of the Legislative Assembly of Ontario from 1990 to 1995 who represented the central Ontario riding of Simcoe Centre.

== Background ==
Wessenger attended the University of Toronto, receiving a law degree. He worked as a lawyer in Toronto for four and a half years, and then practiced in Barrie, Ontario for a further twenty-one years. From 1973 to 1976 he served as an alderman within Barrie. There is a street in Barrie named after him.

== Politics ==
He ran for the Ontario legislature in the 1975 provincial election, coming a close second to Progressive Conservative incumbent Art Evans in the riding of Simcoe Centre. He ran again in the 1977 provincial election, losing to the PC candidate George William Taylor by a greater margin.

Wessenger ran for the House of Commons of Canada as a candidate for the federal New Democratic Party in the 1980 federal election, but finished third in the riding of Simcoe South. He ran a third provincial campaign in the 1985 provincial election, but again lost to PC candidate Earl Rowe.

The NDP won a majority government in the 1990 provincial election, and Wessenger, running for a fourth time in Simcoe Centre, defeated incumbent Liberal Bruce Owen by almost 3,000 votes. He served as parliamentary assistant to the Attorney General from 1991 to 1995 and to the Minister of Health for the remainder of his time in office.

In 1992, Wessenger and Jack Layton travelled the province to seek public consultation on changes to Ontario's Public Hospitals Act.

The NDP were defeated in the 1995 provincial election, and Wessenger finished third against PC candidate Joe Tascona.

== Electoral record ==
1995 Ontario general election: Simcoe Centre
Party	Candidate	Votes
Progressive Conservative	Joe Tascona	29,790
Liberal	Bruce Owen	12,061
New Democratic	Paul Wessenger	7,655
Family Coalition	Susane MacPhee-Manning	769
Green	Richard Warman	580
Independent	Les Barnett	284
Total valid votes		51,139

1990 Ontario general election: Simcoe Centre
Party	Candidate	Votes	%
New Democratic	Paul Wessenger	15,711	37.8
Liberal	Bruce Owen	12,869	31.0
Progressive Conservative	Ben Andrews	10,013	24.1
Confederation of Regions	Bonnie Ainsworth	2,979	7.2
Total valid votes		41,572	

1985 Ontario general election: Simcoe Centre
Party	Candidate	Votes
Progressive Conservative	Earl W. Rowe	15,379
Liberal	Ross Whiteside	14,845
New Democratic	Paul Wessenger	9,639
Independent	Steve Kaasgaard	566
Total valid votes		40,429

1980 Canadian federal election: Simcoe South
Party	Candidate	Votes
Progressive Conservative	Ronald Stewart	19,768
Liberal	Bruce Owen	16,174
New Democratic	Paul Wessenger	9,474

1977 Ontario general election: Simcoe Centre
Party	Candidate	Votes	%
Progressive Conservative	George Taylor	15,876	44.25
New Democratic	Paul Wessenger	10,442	29.11
Liberal	Jim Corneau	9,556	26.64

1975 Ontario general election: Simcoe Centre
Party	Candidate	Votes
Progressive Conservative	David Arthur Evans	13,555
New Democratic	Paul Wessenger	11,623
Liberal	Margaret Kelly	9,116
