= Hepburn ministry =

Cabinet of Ontario, 1934–1942

- 11th ministry of Ontario

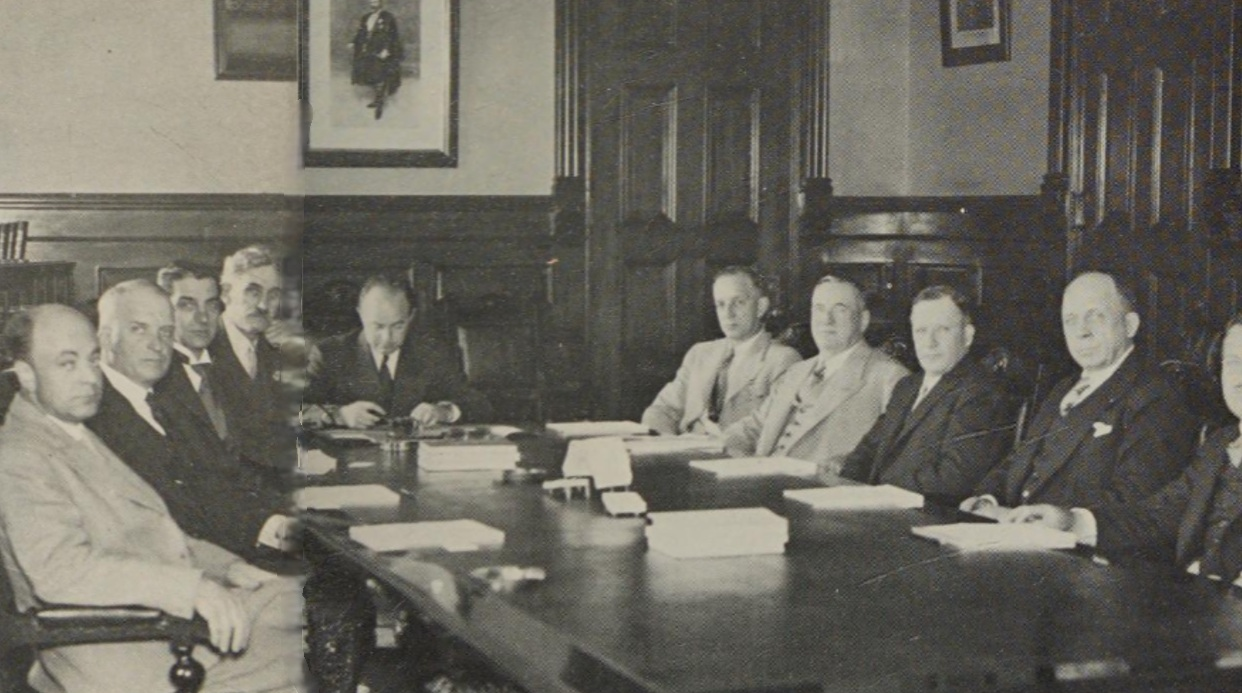
- Hon. Mitchell Frederick Hepburn
- Date formed: July 10, 1934
- Date dissolved: August 17, 1943
Monarch & Vice Regals
People and organisations
Monarch	George V; Edward VIII; George VI
Lieutenant Governor	Herbert Alexander Bruce (1937); Albert E. Matthews (1937-1942)
- Premier: Mitch Hepburn; Gordon Conant; Harry Nixon
- No. of ministers: 10 (initial); 14 (max, 1937-10-12)
- Total no. of members: 23
- Member party: Ontario Liberal Party
- Status in legislature: Majority 70 / 90(78%) 1934 66 / 90(73%) 1937
- Opposition party: Conservative Party
- Opposition leader: George Henry (1937–38); George Drew (1938–43)

History
- Incoming formation: 1934 election
- Elections: 1934, 1937
- Legislature term: 19th, 20th
- Predecessor: Ferguson ministry
- Successor: Drew ministry

The Hepburn ministry, formally speaking the Hepburn-Conant-Nixon ministry, was the cabinet that directed the Government of Ontario (formally the Executive Council of Ontario) over a nine-year period from July 10, 1934 to August 17, 1943. Liberal Premier Mitch Hepburn, at age thirty seven, the youngest premier in Ontario's history, composed the ministry initially and led it for more than eight of its nine-year tenure. His two successors, Gordon Conant and Harry Nixon, made adjustments to the ministry during their respective six-month and three-month premiership, but with the same group of ministers.

The ministry was formed as a result of the Liberal Party's victory in the 1934 Ontario general election. After being in the wilderness for almost thirty years, they ousted the incumbent Conservative Henry ministry in spectacular fashion, securing more than two-third of the seats in the 19th Parliament of Ontario on their own, and in addition have formed an alliance with the Progressive Party (whose members contested the election as Liberal-Progressives), United Farmers, and Liberal-Labour. The ministry renewed its governing mandate in the 1937 election, again securing more than two-third of the seats in the 20th Parliament of Ontario.

Despite the Liberal Party having secured a substantial majority electoral mandate, the council of ministers included members who were formally affiliated with the Progressive Party or the United Farmers of Ontario when they entered cabinet, or have been members of the government caucus during the United Farmer-Labour Drury ministry a decade earlier. Among them was Progressive Party leader Harry Nixon, the Provincial Secretary in the Drury ministry who would lead this Liberal ministry in its final months. Hepburn was able to build this unusual governing alliance in part thanks to his own background as a one-time United Farmers activist. Those members were all eventually integrated into the Liberal Party formally during the tenure of the ministry. Two of those members, Nixon and Farquhar Oliver, would later become leaders of the Liberal Party.

An unabashed populist, Hepburn presided over the ministry for the latter part of the great depression and the beginning of the Second World War. The ministry carried out sweeping cost-saving measures, played an active role in the development and management of the province's resources sector, aggressively pursued industrial and social reform, while parting ways with the party's past stance on liquor sales and energy that had restricted its popularity. Hepburn's strong personality also alienated some key stakeholders, first among them national Liberal leader and Prime Minister Mackenzie King. His antagonistic approach toward organized labour would lead to serious division in his party and the forced departures of two popular senior ministers, Attorney General Arthur Roebuck and municipal affairs minister David Croll, just months before the 1937 election.

Hepburn resigned as Premier of Ontario in October, 1942, and orchestrated to have his designated successor, Gordon Conant, appointed as Premier without having secured buy-ins from his cabinet, parliamentary caucus or party. The swift push back from the Liberal caucus and the party's rank and file that followed forced Hepburn to call a formal leadership convention and Conant to contest the leadership while leading a ministry he had neither chosen nor secured the backing from. Hepburn's unilateral decision sent the Liberal Party through a tumultuous period of internal conflict and triggered a leadership convention on the eve of a general election that was already delayed by the ongoing World War II. Harry Nixon won the leadership convention in May 1943 and notional led the ministry for two months before leading a divided party to its devastating defeat. The ministry was replaced by the Progressive Conservative Drew ministry.

== Changes to composition ==
Two ministers, Peter Heenan and Thomas McQuesten, served through the entirety of the ministry under all three premiers, with McQuesten having held the highways portfolio the entire time.

=== Ousting of Roebuck and Croll (April 1937) ===
It would take almost three years before the first departures from the ministry occurred. The workers at General Motors in Oshawa had gone on strike in early April 1937. One of their demands was for recognition of their union, the new United Auto Workers, an affiliate of the Committee of Industrial Organization, which Hepburn was obsessively antagonistic toward. To break the strike, Hepburn even deployed a special police force, known irreverently as "Hepburn's Hussars" and "Sons-of-Mitches." Given the deep labour ties of Attorney General Arthur Roebuck and municipal affairs minister David Croll, they were vocal opponents of the Premier's action. While the conflict had been simmering, the Premier's sudden demand for their resignation on April 15 still caught most by surprise. While Croll quickly complied and expressed relief, Roebuck sought and was denied an audience with the Premier, went home and arranged to have his resignation later in the day.

=== Cox's Short-lived presence (December 1936 to October 1937) ===
To demonstrate his commitment to cost saving, Hepburn initial cabinet only had 10 members. He specifically declined to name any minister without portfolio. During the 19th parliament, Hepburn only brought one new member into the ministry, Charles Winnans Cox from Fort William (now Thunday Bay), as a minister without portfolio in December 1936. Cox's cabinet tenure was short-lived. Two month after being promoted, he was involved in a bizarre incident of a soured lover throwing acid at him and seriously injured him. While he was not immediately dismissed and managed to win re-election, he was relieved of his cabinet duty at the post election shuffle.

=== Eight new minister via post re-election shuffle (October 1937) ===
Two ministers, agriculture minister Duncan Marshall and health minister James Faulkner, were defeated in the 1937 election.

Hepburn conducted the only major cabinet shuffle during this ministry soon after securing a second majority mandate. Eight new ministers entered cabinet in October 1937, including three newly elected members. Expanding the council of minister to 14 members. Among the rookies were Gordon Conant, a former mayor of Oshawa elected in the electoral district of Ontario, which Hepburn see as a sign of affirmation from the local electorate for his tough approach to the Oshawa strike. Conant was given the prestigious Attorney General role.

=== Brief savoring of a prized long denied (Sumner 1938) ===
Morrison MacBride was first elected a Labour Party member in 1919 and was instrumental in negotiating the coalition government that led to the Drury ministry, but broke with party when it opted to put forward another member for the coalition cabinet. He finally obtained the cabinet seat that was denied of him for eighteen years in the post 1937 election shuffled, but did not get to savour it for long. A heart attacked claimed his life in June the following year when he was only 60.

Norman Hipel took MacBride's place a few months later. In doing do he gave up the speakership of the legislature.

=== Unexpected passing, unprecedent promotion (August 1940) ===
In the summer 1940, education minister Leonard Simpson unexpectedly died of a heart attack. Four days later in a highly unusual move, Hepburn appointed Duncan McArthur, who the Liberals brought in a few years earlier as the education department's civil service head, to succeed his political master directly. A month later in an even more unusual move, the Premier called the by-election for the seat left vacant by Simpsons with McArthur as the candidate, in hopes of the opposition being deterred by the ongoing war from contesting the by-election. The bet played out as the Premier expected. McArthur was returned by acclamation as Simpson's successor in the legislature.

=== Steady administration through political calamity (October 1942 onward) ===
In view of the political upheaval triggered by Hepburn unilaterally anointing Conant as premier, the cabinet remained reasonably stable. While the four senior central administration posts were all affected as they were all held by Hepburn, Conant and Nixon at the time, the ministers heading seven of the other ten functional portfolios remained in place through both transition. Conant made no change to the ministry upon his assumption of the premiership, and only requested the resignation of one minister during his six months at the helm, from Hepburn as Provincial Treasurer, and replaced him with Liquor Board chairman and minister without portfolio St. Clair Gordon, who continued under Nixon. Only two ministers, Harry Nixon and Farquhar Oliver resigned from in protest, and they both resumed their previous portfolio following Nixon's assumption of the premiership, with Nixon acting as his own Provincial Secretary. During Conant's premiership, Nixon's provincial secretary portfolio was covered by lands and forests minister Norman Hipel, while Oliver's Public Works and Public Welfare portfolio was covered respectively by highways minister McQuesten and health minister Harold Kirby. The only other change Nixon made in his brief tenure was to bring back former minister Eric Cross to replace the outgoing premier as Attorney General and to release McQueston of the municipal affairs portfolio.

=== Cursed portfolio (July 1943) ===
The ministry would suffer one final departure while Nixon was at its helm. Education minister Duncan McArthur, like his predecessor Leonard Simpson, died unexpectedly two weeks before the ministry's defeat at the 1943 election. The two education ministers from the Hepburn ministry were to this day the only Ontario education ministers who have died in office.

== Lasting Legacy ==
Upon his selection as Ontario Liberal leader, Hepburn stated his benchmark for legacy simply, "I am going to do my best. I am going to make some contribution to the welfare of this Province. I hope when my span is over on this earth it will be better than when I came in."

Under Hepburn's leadership, the ministry undoubtedly made well more than just some contribution to the welfare of this Province. Despite its stated initial objective of austerity, the ministry nonetheless expand the role of government in its citizen's day-to-day lives through systemic broadening of social programs to meet the evolving need of growing population, and instituted practices (the most cited example being the mandatory pasteurization of milk) that later became standard that were taken for granted. The ministry invested in care for the mentally ill and in new hospitals and pursued progressive reforms in public education. Despite his obsessive animosity toward international labour unions, his ministry actually took major strides in regulating and lifting employment standards. Despite Hepburn's penchant for dramatic quarrels in the political arena, he quietly defused religious resentment from the equalization tax revenues for Catholic school boards with increased provincial grants.

While many other factors contributed to Ontario's improved economic condition, deliberate policy decision by the ministry and Hepburn's role as his own government's Treasurer played apparent roles to the scale of Ontario's economic recovery following The Great Depression. As treasurer, Hepburn produced budgetary surpluses while overly instigated growth through highway construction, selective support for resource industries and more direct role in hydroelectricity management. Driven by his instinctive misgiving toward wealthy elite and government waste, Hepburn's aggressive streamlining of civil service redundancy and push for diligent collections of estate duties earn him enmity from some powerful corners, but revenue enabled him to expand the provincial government footprint while instituting progressive to personal and corporate income-tax changes and assuming costs from the cash-strapped municipalities.

The Hepburn ministry was defined by its namesake's personality. Hepburn was the only Ontario Liberal leader to have led the party from opposition into promised land in a period spanning over a century. (Note: The previous instance was 1871 under the leadership of Edward Blake; the next instance was 1985 under the leadership of David Peterson) This lifted the Liberal Party back on its feet and gave its the fight needed to oust an incumbent government for the first time in over sixty years. This inflicted lasting damages on the party, exiling it from government despite many achievements, and set the course for its four-decade long wandering in the wilderness.

== List of ministers ==
=== List of ministers ordered by precedence ===
Minister	Entered ministry	Exited ministry	Electoral district	(Note: Indicate that year's Ontario general election unless otherwise noted)First elected	Note
Mitch Hepburn	1934-07-10	1943-02-28	Elgin	1934	Resigned from ministry
Harry Nixon	(1919-11-19)		Brant	1919	Drury ministry
Harry Nixon	1934-07-10	1942-10-22	Brant	1919	Resigned from ministry (Note: In protest of Hepburn unilateral decision to install Conant.)
Harry Nixon	1943-05-18	1943-08-17	Brant	1919	
Peter Heenan	1934-07-10	1943-08-17	Kenora	1919	Served entire duration of ministry; federal King ministry (1926–30)
Leonard Simpson	1934-07-10	1940-08-18	Simcoe Centre	1929	Died in office
Arthur Roebuck	1934-07-10	1937-04-14	Bellwoods	1934	Resigned from ministry (Note: Over 1937 Oshawa auto strike)
Duncan Marshall	1934-07-10	1937-10-12	Peel	1934	Defeated (1937 election)
Thomas McQuesten	1934-07-10	1943-08-17	Hamilton—Wentworth	1934	Served entire duration of ministry
David Croll	1934-07-10	1937-04-14	Windsor—Walkerville	1934	Resigned from ministry
Paul Leduc	1934-07-10	1940-09-30	Ottawa East	1934	Resigned to accept appointment (Note: as registrar of the Supreme Court of Canada)
James Albert Faulkner	1934-07-10	1937-10-12	Hastings West	1934	Defeated (1937 election)
Charles Winnans Cox	1936-12-18	1937-10-12	Port Arthur	1934	Resigned from ministry (Note: Relieved from duty following a scandal of him being seriously injured by a lover, was not appointed back to cabinet.)
Morrison Mann MacBride	1937-10-12	1938-06-05	Brantford	1919	Died in office
Patrick Michael Dewan	1937-10-12	1943-08-17	Oxford	1934	
Harold Kirby	1937-10-12	1943-08-17	Eglinton	1934	
St. Clair Gordon	1937-10-12	1943-08-17	Kent West	1934	
William Houck	1937-10-12	1943-05-18	Niagara Falls	1934	
Colin Campbell	1937-10-12	1941-01-23	Sault Ste. Marie	1937	
Gordon Conant	1937-10-12	1943-05-18	Ontario	1937	Resigned from ministry
Eric Cross	1937-10-12	1940-11-22	Haldimand—Norfolk	1937	
Eric Cross	1943-05-18	1943-08-17	Haldimand—Norfolk	1937	
Norman Hipel	1938-09-02	1943-08-17	Waterloo South	1930	
Duncan McArthur	1940-08-18	1943-07-20	Simcoe Centre	1940	Died in office
Robert Laurier	1940-10-07	1943-08-17	Ottawa East	1940	
Farquhar Oliver	1941-01-23	1942-10-27	Grey South	1926	Resigned from ministry
Farquhar Oliver	1943-05-18	1943-08-17	Grey South	1926	

=== List of minister by portfolio ===
Held portfolio through both transitions
Held portfolio through Hepburn-Conant transition
Held portfolio through Conant-Nixon transition

Portfolio	Minister	Start	End	Notes
Central administration portfolios
Premier of Ontario	Mitchell Hepburn	1934-07-10	1942-10-21	
Premier of Ontario	Gordon Conant	1942-10-21	1943-05-18	
Premier of Ontario	Harry Nixon	1943-05-18	1943-08-17	
Attorney General	Arthur Roebuck	1934-07-10	1937-04-14	
Attorney General	Paul Leduc	1937-04-15	1937-10-12	interim
Attorney General	Gordon Conant	1937-10-12	1943-05-18	while premier (from 1942-10-21)
Attorney General	Eric Cross	1943-05-18	1943-08-17	
Treasurer	Mitchell Hepburn	1934-07-10	1943-02-28	while premier (until 1942-10-21)
Treasurer	St. Clair Gordon	1943-03-03	1943-08-17	
Provincial Secretary & Registrar	Harry Nixon	1934-07-10	1942-10-22 (Note: Resigned on March 11, 1940, but the resignation was withdrawn two days later.)	
Provincial Secretary & Registrar	Norman Hipel	1942-10-27	1943-05-18	
Provincial Secretary & Registrar	Harry Nixon	1943-05-18	1943-08-17	while premier
Resources and economy portfolio
Minister of Lands and Forests	Peter Heenan	1934-07-10	1941-05-27	
Minister of Lands and Forests	Norman Hipel	1941-05-27	1943-08-17	
Minister of Mines	Paul Leduc	1934-07-10	1940-09-30	
Minister of Mines	Thomas McQuesten	1940-09-30	1940-10-07	interim
Minister of Mines	Robert Laurier	1940-10-07	1943-08-17	
Minister of Agriculture	Duncan Marshall	1934-07-10	1937-10-12	
Minister of Agriculture	Patrick Michael Dewan	1937-10-12	1943-08-17	
Minister in charge of Game and Fisheries	Harry Nixon	1934-07-10	1942-10-21	
Public assets portfolios
Minister of Public Works	Thomas McQuesten	1934-07-10	1937-10-12	
Minister of Public Works	Colin Campbell	1937-10-12	1941-01-23	
Minister of Public Works	Farquhar Oliver	1941-01-23	1942-10-27	
Minister of Public Works	Thomas McQuesten	1942-10-27	1943-05-18	
Minister of Public Works	Farquhar Oliver	1943-05-18	1943-08-17	
Ministry of Highways	Thomas McQuesten	1934-07-10	1943-08-17	
Minister of Municipal Affairs	David Croll	1934-07-10	1937-04-14	
Minister of Municipal Affairs	Mitchell Hepburn	1937-04-15	1937-10-12	interim while Premier
Minister of Municipal Affairs	Eric Cross	1937-10-12	1940-11-22	
Minister of Municipal Affairs	Thomas McQuesten	1940-11-22	1943-05-18	
Minister of Municipal Affairs	Eric Cross	1943-05-18	1943-08-17	
Social & human services portfolio
Minister of Education	Leonard Simpson	1934-07-10	1940-08-18	
Minister of Education	Duncan McArthur	1940-08-22	1943-07-20	
Minister of Labour	Arthur Roebuck	1934-07-10	1935-05-21	
Minister of Labour	David Croll	1935-05-21	1937-04-14	
Minister of Labour	Mitchell Hepburn	1937-04-15	1937-10-12	interim while Premier
Minister of Labour	Morrison Mann MacBride	1937-10-12	1938-06-05	
Minister of Labour	Peter Heenan	1938-06-14	1938-09-02	interim
Minister of Labour	Norman Hipel	1938-09-02	1941-05-27	
Minister of Labour	Peter Heenan	1941-05-27	1943-08-17	
Minister of Health	James Albert Faulkner	1934-07-10	1937-10-12	
Minister of Health	Harold Kirby	1937-10-12	1943-08-17	
Minister of Public Welfare	David Croll	1934-07-10	1937-04-14	
Minister of Public Welfare	Mitchell Hepburn	1937-04-14	1937-10-12	interim while Premier
Minister of Public Welfare	Eric Cross	1937-10-12	1940-11-22	
Minister of Public Welfare	Norman Hipel	1940-11-22	1941-05-27	
Minister of Public Welfare	Farquhar Oliver	1941-05-27	1942-10-27	
Minister of Public Welfare	Harold Kirby	1942-10-27	1943-05-18	
Minister of Public Welfare	Farquhar Oliver	1943-05-18	1943-08-17	
Ministers without portfolio
Minister Without Portfolio	Charles Winnans Cox	1936-12-18	1937-10-12	
Minister Without Portfolio	St. Clair Gordon	1937-10-12	1943-03-03	
Minister Without Portfolio	William Limburg Houck	1937-10-12	1943-08-17	designated as Hydro Commissioner

=== Composition timeline ===
Events	(Note: 1934-07-10: Hepburn ministry took office)	(Note: 1935-05-21: David Croll took over labour portfolio from Arthur Roebuck)	(Note: 1936-12-18: Charles Winnans Cox enter cabinet as minister without portfolio)	(Note: 1937-04-14: Hepburn demanded and accepted resignations of David Croll & Arthur Roebuck over disgreement on the Oshawa auto worker strike)	(Note: 1937-10-12: Post-election shuffle; Duncan Marshall, James Faulkner left cabinet following electoral defeat; Charles Cox left cabinet; eight new ministers entered cabinet)	(Note: 1938-06-05: Morrison MacBride died in office)	(Note: 1938-09-02: Norman Hipel entered cabinet as public welfare minister)		(Note: 1940-03-11: Harry Nixon resigned from cabinet, but was persuaded to rescind resignation two days later)	(Note: 1940-08-18: Leonard Simpson died in office; 1940-08-22: deputy minister Duncan McArthur succeeded both as minister, and later as MPP)	(Note: 1940-09-30: Paul Leduc left cabinet and legislature, Robert Laurier succeeded as minister and later as MPP; 1940-11-22: Eric Cross left cabinet)	(Note: 1941-01-23: Farquhar Oliver entered cabinet as public works minister)	(Note: 1941-05-27: Peter Heenan and Norman Hipel exchanged portfolios; Farquhar Oliver took on additional public welfare portfolio)	(Note: 1942-10-21: Hepburn resigned as first minister and unilaterally installed Gordon Conant; 1942-10-21: Harry Nixon resigned in protest; 1942-10-27: Farquhar Oliver resigned in protest)	(Note: 1943-03-03: Conant requested Hepburn's resignation as Treasurer; St Clair Gordon became Treasurer)	(Note: 1943-04-30: Harry Nixon elected party leader; 1943-05-18: Nixon assumed premiership, Farquhar Oliver and Eric Cross returned to ministry)	(Note: 1943-07-20: Duncan McArthur died in office, a week before general election; 1943-08-04: Nixon led Liberals defeated in general election; 1943-08-17: ministry resigned from office.)
Portfolio	1934	1935	1936	1937		1938		1939	1940			1941		1942	1943		
Premier	Mitchell Hepburn													Conant		Nixon	
Attorney Gen.	Arthur Roebuck			Leduc	Gordon Conant											Cross	
Treasurer	Mitchell Hepburn														Gordon		
Secretary	Harry Nixon													Hipel		Nixon	
Agriculture	Duncan Marshall				Patrick Dewan												
Lands & Forest	Peter Heenan												Norman Hipel				
Mines	Paul Leduc										Robert Laurier						
Public Works	Thomas McQuesten				Colin Campbell							Farquhar Oliver		McQuesten		Oliver	
Highways	Thomas McQuesten																
Municipal	David Croll			Hepburn	Eric Cross							Thomas McQuesten				Cross	
Education	Leonard Simpson									Duncan McArthur							(Note: Vacant following McArthur's death)
Labour	A. Roebuck		David Croll	Hepburn	MacBride	Heenan		Norman Hipel					Peter Heenan				
Public Welfare	David Croll			Hepburn	Eric Cross						Hipel		Farquhar Oliver	H. Kirby		Oliver	
Health	James Faulkner				Harold Kirby												
without portfolio				C.W. Cox	William Houck												
without portfolio					St. Clair Gordon												
