= Hugh Murdoch =

Hugh Murdoch may refer to:

- Gilbert Hugh Murdoch, Canadian politician
- Hugh Murdoch Ross, Australian politician
