= Bruce Owen =

Canadian lawyer and politician (1931–2022)

Member of the Ontario Provincial Parliament for Simcoe Centre
- In office 1987–1990
- Preceded by: Earl W. Rowe
- Succeeded by: Paul Wessenger

Personal details
- Born: May 24, 1931 Chatham, Ontario, Canada
- Died: February 7, 2022 (aged 90) Barrie, Ontario, Canada
- Party: Liberal
- Spouse: Anne
- Children: 3
- Profession: Lawyer

Bruce Owen (May 24, 1931 – February 7, 2022) was a Canadian lawyer and politician in Ontario. He served as a Member of Provincial Parliament (MPP) in the Legislative Assembly of Ontario from 1987 to 1990, representing Simcoe Centre for the provincial Liberal Party.

== Early life ==
Bruce Owen was born in Chatham, Ontario, on May 24, 1931. He studied at the University of Western Ontario and graduated with a Bachelor of Arts, before obtaining a Bachelor of Social Work from the University of Toronto. He later earned a Bachelor of Laws from Osgoode Hall Law School. He specialized in real estate law and wills and estates. Owen relocated to Barrie in 1959. In the 1960s, he served two terms as an alderman for Barrie City Council. He also served as a judge for the small claims court.

== Political career ==
Bruce Owen ran for the House of Commons of Canada three times as a candidate of the Liberal Party of Canada. He lost to P.B. Rynard of the Progressive Conservative Party (PC) in Simcoe North in the 1972 election, and to PC Ronald A. Stewart in Simcoe South in the elections of 1980 and 1984.

Owen ran for the Ontario legislature in the 1967 provincial election, but lost to PC candidate Arthur Evans by 2,530 votes in Simcoe Centre. He ran again in the 1981 election, and lost to PC candidate George Taylor by a wider margin. Owen was finally elected in the 1987 election, defeating PC incumbent Earl W. Rowe by 2,492 votes in Simcoe Centre. He served as a backbench member of David Peterson's Liberal majority government for the next three years. During his tenure as an MPP, he played a pivotal role in bringing a Honda car plant to Alliston, as well as obtaining site approval for the Royal Victoria Regional Health Centre. He also tabled legislation to prohibit smoking in workplaces.

The Liberals were defeated in the 1990 provincial election, and Bruce Owen lost his seat to Paul Wessenger of the NDP by almost 3,000 votes. He attempted a comeback in the 1995 election, but lost to PC candidate Joe Tascona by 17,729 votes.

== Outside politics ==
Owen was the programme chairman of the Barrie Concert Association, and has presented numerous programs of classical music in the city including the "Colours of Music" festivals. He was a vocal soloist for several churches in Barrie, and performed a solo in the papal choir when Pope John Paul II visited the city and the nearby Martyrs' Shrine in 1984.

Owen presented a plan to city council for a new arts theatre in 2005, noting that the existing Fisher Auditorium is showing signs of age. His plan has been supported by some figures in the tourism sector.

== Personal life ==
Owen was married to Anne until her death in 2018. Together, they had three children: Trevor, Valerie, and Pamela. They resided in Shanty Bay.

Owen died at the Royal Victoria Regional Health Centre in Barrie, Ontario, on February 7, 2022, at the age of 90. He had suffered a heart attack prior to his death. A funeral was held for Owen at the Trinity Anglican Church in Barrie on February 12, 2022.
