= Barrie—Simcoe—Bradford (provincial electoral district) =

Former provincial electoral district in Ontario, Canada

Barrie—Simcoe—Bradford was a provincial electoral district in central Ontario, Canada, that elected one Member of the Legislative Assembly of Ontario. It was created in 1999 from Simcoe Centre and a small part from Simcoe West. It was abolished in 2007 into Barrie, Simcoe—Grey and York—Simcoe.

The riding included the municipalities of Barrie, Innisfil and Bradford West Gwillimbury.

Barrie—Simcoe—Bradford
Assembly	Years	Member	Party
Riding created from parts of Simcoe Centre and Simcoe West
37th	1999–2003	Joe Tascona	Progressive Conservative
38th	2003–2007	Joe Tascona	Progressive Conservative
Riding dissolved into Barrie, Simcoe—Grey and York—Simcoe

== Provincial election results ==
2003 Ontario general election
Party	Candidate	Votes	%	±%
Progressive Conservative	Joe Tascona	31,529	51.78	–12.27
Liberal	Mike Ramsay	21,998	36.13	+6.92
New Democratic	John Thomson	5,641	9.26	+4.45
Green	Stewart Sinclair	1,278	2.10	–
Family Coalition	Roberto Sales	441	0.72	–
Total valid votes		60,887	99.51	
Total rejected, unmarked and declined ballots		298	0.49	–0.17
Turnout		61,185	56.03	+0.47
Eligible voters		109,208		
Progressive Conservative hold		Swing		–9.60
Source: Elections Ontario

1999 Ontario general election
Party	Candidate	Votes	%
Progressive Conservative	Joe Tascona	33,721	64.06
Liberal	Maura Bolger	15,376	29.21
New Democratic	Jim Brooker	2,532	4.81
Independent	W. Tracogna	482	0.92
Independent	Rudy A. Couture	302	0.57
Natural Law	Mitchell Hibbs	229	0.44
Total valid votes		52,642	99.35
Total rejected, unmarked and declined ballots		346	0.65
Turnout		52,988	55.55
Eligible voters		95,382	
Progressive Conservative pickup new district.			
Source: Elections Ontario

== See also ==
- List of Ontario provincial electoral districts
- Canadian provincial electoral districts
