= Earl Rowe =

Earl Rowe may refer to:

- William Earl Rowe (1894–1984), lieutenant governor of Ontario
- Earl W. Rowe (born 1951), politician in Ontario, Canada
- Earl Rowe (actor) (1920–2002), American actor
