= Simcoe South (provincial electoral district) =

Ontario electoral district

Defunct provincial electoral district
- Legislature: Legislative Assembly of Ontario
- District created: 1867
- District abolished: 1933
- First contested: 1867
- Last contested: 1929

Simcoe South was an electoral riding in Ontario, Canada. It was created in 1867 at the time of confederation and was abolished in 1933 before the 1934 election.

== Members of Provincial Parliament ==
Simcoe South
Assembly	Years	Member	Party
1st	1867–1871	Thomas Roberts Ferguson	Conservative
2nd	1871–1873	Thomas Roberts Ferguson	Conservative
2nd	1874–1874	D'Arcy Boulton	Conservative
3rd	1875–1875	D'Arcy Boulton	Conservative
3rd	1875–1878	William McDougall	Liberal
3rd	1878–1879	William James Parkhill	Conservative
4th	1879–1883	William James Parkhill	Conservative
5th	1883–1886	George Prevost McKay	Conservative
Distributed to Simcoe Centre, East, & West in 1886. Reestablished from Cardwell in 1908 as Simcoe South
12th	1908–1911	Alexander Ferguson	Conservative
13th	1911–1914	Alexander Ferguson	Conservative
14th	1914–1919	Alexander Ferguson	Conservative
15th	1919–1923	Edgar James Evans	United Farmers
16th	1923–1926	William Earl Rowe	Conservative
Merged with Simcoe West to became Simcoe Southwest
17th	1926–1929	John Henry Mitchell (Note: Legislative Assembly and Elections Ontario records errorneously identify Mitchell as Liberal-Progressive. Mitchell made numerous unequivocal statement confirming his Liberal affiliation early in his term.)	Liberal
18th	1929–1934	James Edgar Jamieson	Conservative
Redistributed to Simcoe Centre and Simcoe East in 1934.
Sourced from the Ontario Legislative Assembly

== Election results ==
=== Simcoe Southwest (1926–1934) ===
1929 Ontario general election: Simcoe Southwest
Party	Candidate	Votes	%	±%
Conservative	James Edgar Jamieson	6,213	54.44	+6.47
Liberal	John Henry Mitchell	5,200	45.56	–6.47
Total valid votes		11,413	99.49	
Total rejected ballots		58	0.51	–0.09
Turnout		11,471	69.56	+1.15
Eligible voters		16,490		
Conservative gain from Liberal		Swing		+6.47
Source: Elections Ontario

1926 Ontario general election: Simcoe Southwest
Party	Candidate	Votes	%	±%
Liberal	John Henry Mitchell	5,779	52.03	+8.40
Conservative	James Edgar Jamieson	5,327	47.97	–8.40
Total valid votes		11,106	99.40	
Total rejected ballots		67	0.60	
Turnout		11,173	68.41	+5.31
Eligible voters		16,332		
Liberal gain		Swing		+8.40
Source: Elections Ontario; Changes and swing calculated by adding the vote tallies from the two merged EDs, and with the sum of tallies of all opposition candidates. Elections Ontario records mislabeled the results for Simcoe South as Simcoe West, and Simcoe West as St Catharines. Correct tallies were used and verified against contemporaneous press reports. Legislative Assembly and Elections Ontario records erroneously identify Mitchell as Liberal-Progressive. Mitchell made numerous unequivocal statements confirming his Liberal affiliation early in his term.

=== Simcoe South (1908–1926) ===
1923 Ontario general election
Party	Candidate	Votes	%	±%
Conservative	William Earl Rowe	3,016	55.88	+9.56
United Farmers	Edgar James Evans	2,381	44.12	–9.56
Total valid votes		5,397	99.41	
Total rejected ballots		32	0.59	–2.62
Turnout		5,429	72.20	–3.48
Eligible voters		7,519		
Conservative gain from United Farmers		Swing		+9.56
Source: Elections Ontario

1919 Ontario general election
Party	Candidate	Votes	%	±%
United Farmers	Edgar James Evans	2,927	53.68	–
Conservative	Alexander Ferguson	2,526	46.32	–20.30
Total valid votes		5,453	96.79	
Total rejected ballots		181	3.21	+2.94
Turnout		5,634	75.69	+3.30
Eligible voters		7,444		
United Farmers gain from Conservative		Swing		–
Source: Elections Ontario

1914 Ontario general election
Party	Candidate	Votes	%	±%
Conservative	Alexander Ferguson	1,447	66.62	–
Liberal	Lachlan MacLean	725	33.38	–
Total valid votes		2,172	99.72	
Total rejected ballots		6	0.28	
Turnout		2,178	72.38	
Eligible voters		3,009		
Conservative hold		Swing		–
Source: Elections Ontario

1911 Ontario general election
Party	Candidate	Votes
Conservative	Alexander Ferguson	acclaimed
Source: Elections Ontario

1908 Ontario general election
Party	Candidate	Votes
Conservative	Alexander Ferguson	acclaimed
Source: Elections Ontario

=== Simcoe South (1867–1886) ===
1883 Ontario general election
Party	Candidate	Votes	%	±%
Conservative	George Prevost McKay	1,214	53.72	–
Liberal	Joseph G. Hood	1,046	46.28	–
Total valid votes		2,260	99.60	
Total rejected ballots		9	0.40	–
Turnout		2,269	66.99	–
Eligible voters		3,387		
Conservative hold		Swing		–
Source: Elections Ontario

1879 Ontario general election
Party	Candidate	Votes
Conservative	William James Parkhill	Acclaimed
Source: Elections Ontario

Ontario provincial by-election, October 1878 Resignation of William McDougall
Party	Candidate	Votes	Elected
Conservative	William James Parkhill	Unknown	✓
Independent	John H.W. Wilson	Unknown	
Conservative gain from Independent Liberal			
Source: History of the Electoral Districts, Legislatures and Ministries of the Province of Ontario

Ontario provincial by-election, June 1875 Death of D'Arcy Boulton
Party	Candidate	Votes	%	±%
Independent Liberal	William McDougall	817	60.30	
Independent	G. Dinwoody	538	39.70	
Total valid votes		1,355		
Independent Liberal gain from Conservative		Swing		–
Source: History of the Electoral Districts, Legislatures and Ministries of the Province of Ontario

1875 Ontario general election
Party	Candidate	Votes	%	±%
Conservative	D'Arcy Boulton	1,057	58.17	+4.05
Liberal	R. Snelling	760	41.83	
Total valid votes		1,817	67.15	
Eligible voters		2,706		
Conservative hold		Swing		+4.05
Source: Elections Ontario

Ontario provincial by-election, January 1874 Resignation of Thomas Roberts Ferguson
Party	Candidate	Votes	%
Conservative	D'Arcy Boulton	1,622	54.12
Independent	T. Saunders	1,375	45.88
Total valid votes		2,997	100.0
Conservative hold			
Source: History of the Electoral Districts, Legislatures and Ministries of the Province of Ontario

1871 Ontario general election
Party	Candidate	Votes
Conservative	Thomas Roberts Ferguson	Acclaimed
Source: Elections Ontario

1867 Ontario general election
Party	Candidate	Votes
Conservative	Thomas Roberts Ferguson	Acclaimed
Source: Elections Ontario
