= John Henry Mitchell =

Canadian politician from Ontario

Member of the Legislative Assembly of Ontario
- In office 1926–1929
- Preceded by: William Earl Rowe; James Edgar Jamieson
- Succeeded by: James Edgar Jamieson
- Constituency: Simcoe Southwest

Personal details
- Born: 1872
- Died: 1945-11-02
- Party: Ontario Liberal Party

John Henry Mitchell (1872 – November 2, 1945) was a Canadian politician from Alliston, Ontario who held municipal and provincial elected offices over a period spanning three decades.

== Political career ==
A grain and seed merchant, Mitchell served as mayor of the town of Alliston for thirteen years from 1914 to 1926, and again from 1930 to 1934.

A Liberal partisan, he was nominated by the Liberal Party to contest 1926 Ontario provincial election in Simcoe Southwest, a newly created electoral district from the merger of Simcoe South and West, seats the Conservative won by 12% and 28% margins respectively. In that election over temperance, the two opposition parties cooperated to varying degrees with the Prohibition Union to put forward a joint "dry" candidate against the "wet" candidates put forward by the governing Conservative. Mitchell campaigned overtly as a "Liberal Prohibitionist" candidate and was supported by local Progressive Party members. In a competitive contest against Conservative candidate James Edgar Jamieson, incumbent for Simcoe West who won the previous contest with a 28-point margin, Mitchell secured a 4-point victory.

=== Liberal Partisan ===
In post election reports Mitchell was erroneously labeled by numerous outlets as having campaigned as a Liberal-Progressive candidate. Despite repeated clarifications, the mislabel persisted, possibly perpetuated deliberately by the pro-Conservative Mail & Empire in their push to undermine the leadership of the Progressive Party leader William Raney. In a January 1927 report titled "Cold Shoulder for Hon. Raney", the Mail & Empire made much ado about Mitchell and William Newman, another newly elected member (who did indeed campaigned formally as a Liberal-Progressive), for having switched their allegiances from the Progressive to the Liberals after attending a Progressive Party caucus meeting and intimated that Raney was facing further defections. This prompted an unequivocal press statement from Mitchell stating that, "I have always been a Liberal" and that while he had been supported by many local Progressives, the Progressive Party association in Simcoe held no meeting to formally endorse him or any other candidate. In response to a taunt by Conservative whip William Henry Ireland, Mitchell again firmly restated his Liberal affiliation and commitment to the temperance cause during his maiden speech in the legislature on February 14, 1926.

After serving only one term in the legislature, Mitchell lost a rematch with Jamieson in the 1929 election by a 9-point margin.

Following his electoral defeat, Mitchell returned to serving his local community as mayor of Alliston for a number of years until 1934, when he was appointed the registrar of the Surrogate Court for Simcoe County.

== Private life ==
He was married to Bertha Eliza Greenlees, who predeceased him by about two years. They had one daughter named Vivian (Mrs. Murray Mills). Mitchell died in Alliston on November 2, 1945, at age 74, and is buried at the Alliston Union Cemetery. He remained visible in civic life in his final years, with local reports noting his participation in events in Alliston commemorating the end of World War II as a former mayor just months before his passing.

1926 Ontario general election: Simcoe Southwest
Party	Candidate	Votes	%	±%
Liberal	John Henry Mitchell	5,779	52.03	+8.40
Conservative	James Edgar Jamieson	5,327	47.97	-8.40
Total valid votes		11,106		
Rejected and declined		67		
Total turnout		11,173	68.41	+5.31
Eligible voters		16,332		
Liberal gain		Swing		+8.40
Vote tallies from: Elections Ontario Data Explorer; Change and swing calculated by adding the vote tallies from the two merged EDs, and with the sum of tallies of all opposition candidate. Elections Ontario records mislabeled the results for Simcoe South as Simcoe West, and Simcoe West as St Catharines. Correct tallies were extracted and verified against contemporaneous press reports. Elections Ontario records erroneously identify Mitchell as Liberal-Progressive. Mitchell made numerous unequivocal statement confirming his Liberal affiliation early in his term.

1929 Ontario general election: Simcoe Southwest
Party	Candidate	Votes	%	±%
Conservative	James Edgar Jamieson	6,213	54.44	+6.47
Liberal	John Henry Mitchell	5,200	45.56	-6.47
Total valid votes		11,413		
Rejected and declined		58		
Total turnout		11,471	69.56	+1.15
Eligible voters		16,490		
Conservative gain		Swing		+6.47

== See also ==
- 17th Parliament of Ontario
