= Wandering willy =

Wandering willy may refer to:

- William McDougall (politician, born 1822)
- Tradescantia a rambling plant
