= Joe Tascona =

Canadian politician

Ontario MPP
- In office 1999–2007
- Preceded by: New riding
- Succeeded by: Aileen Carroll
- Constituency: Barrie—Simcoe—Bradford
- In office 1995–1999
- Preceded by: Paul Wessenger
- Succeeded by: Riding abolished
- Constituency: Simcoe Centre

Personal details
- Born: October 9, 1951 (age 74) Barrie, Ontario, Canada
- Party: Progressive Conservative
- Relations: Patrick Brown (nephew)
- Occupation: Lawyer

Joseph N. Tascona (born October 9, 1951) is a former politician in Ontario, Canada. He was a Progressive Conservative member of the Legislative Assembly of Ontario representing the ridings of Barrie—Simcoe—Bradford and Simcoe Centre from 1995 to 2007. He also served as an alderman for Barrie City Council from 1991 to 1995. In 2010 he ran for mayor of Barrie but lost to Jeff Lehman.

== Background ==
Tascona is the son of Edna (Smith) and Joe Tascona. He has an M.B.A. from McMaster University and an LL.B. from Queen's University, and worked as a prominent labour and employment lawyer before entering public life. He also worked for the Ford Motor Company in matters relating to production and labour relations. He has also written several articles for the Industrial Relations Centre at Queen's University on labour and employment law. Tascona also has a sister, Judy who is the mother of former Progressive Conservative leader Patrick Brown.

== Politics ==
Tascona began his political career at the municipal level, serving on Barrie City Council from 1991 to 1995 as an alderman in the City of Barrie's second ward. Tascona was responsible for overseeing the construction of the Barrie Public Library, and the Molson Hockey Centre and helping secure Barrie's waterfront land for public use.

In the provincial election of 1995, he was elected in the riding of Simcoe Centre, defeating Liberal Bruce Owen and incumbent New Democrat Paul Wessenger by a plurality of over 17,000 votes. The Conservatives won the election and Tascona served as a backbench supporter of the Mike Harris government for the next four years.

In the 1999 provincial election, Tascona was re-elected in the redistributed riding of Barrie—Simcoe—Bradford, defeating Liberal Maura Bolger by 18,345 votes. During his second term, Tascona was appointed as Parliamentary assistant to several ministers including the Minister of Education, the Solicitor General and the Minister of Consumer and Business Services.

Although the Progressive Conservatives were defeated in the 2003 provincial election, Tascona was re-elected in his riding with a margin of victory of 9,531 votes. He was subsequently appointed opposition critic for the Attorney General and Government Service. Tascona was also elected as Second Deputy Chair of the Committee of the Whole House. In April 2006, he introduced a private member's bill Restore the Deed Act, calling for the protection of homeowners from title and mortgage fraud and such measures were implemented by the provincial government.

In the 2007 provincial election, Tascona was defeated by Aileen Carroll in the new riding of Barrie.

In 2010, Tascona ran for mayor of Barrie. He was the first to register his name. He lost to Barrie city councilor Jeff Lehman on October 25.

== Electoral record ==
2007 Ontario general election: Barrie
Party	Candidate	Votes	%
Liberal	Aileen Carroll	19,548	42.20
Progressive Conservative	Joe Tascona	18,167	39.22
Green	Erich Jacoby-Hawkins	4,385	9.47
New Democratic	Larry Taylor	3,700	7.99
Family Coalition	Roberto Sales	173	0.37
Libertarian	Paolo Fabrizio	168	0.36
Independent	Darren Adrian Roskam	102	0.22
Independent	Daniel Gray Predie	77	0.17
Total valid votes		46,320	99.57
Total rejected, unmarked and declined ballots		202	0.43
Turnout		46,522	51.95
Eligible voters		89,548	
Liberal pickup new district.			
Source: Elections Ontario
