= Duncan McArthur (Canadian politician) =

Canadian politician (1885–1943)

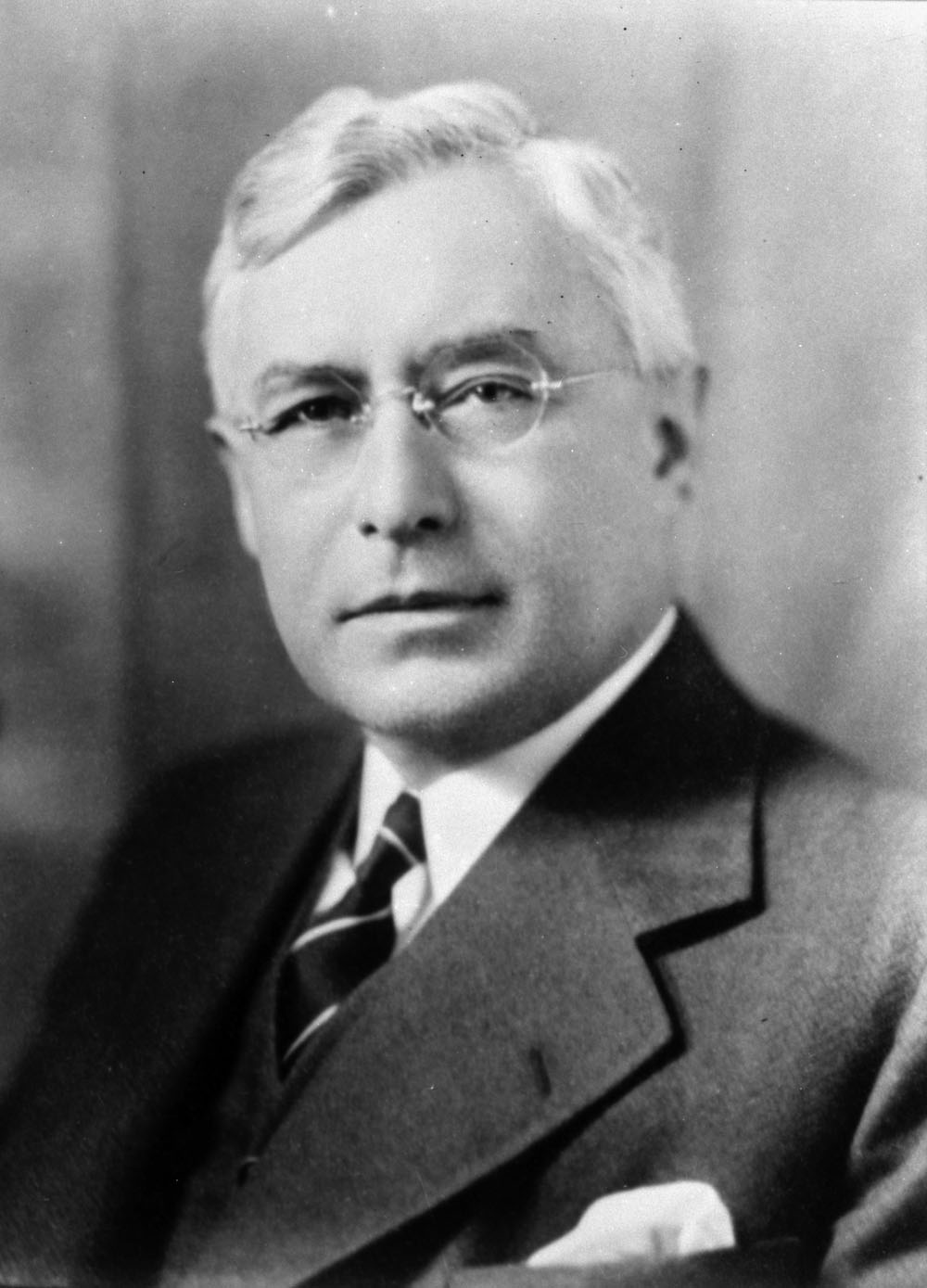
- McArthur, c. 1940

Ontario MPP
- In office 1940–1943
- Preceded by: Leonard Simpson
- Succeeded by: George Graham Johnston
- Constituency: Simcoe Centre

Personal details
- Born: March 17, 1885 Dutton, Ontario, Canada
- Died: July 20, 1943 (aged 58) Grand Bend, Ontario, Canada
- Party: Liberal
- Spouse: Floy Lawson
- Occupation: Lawyer

Duncan McArthur (March 17, 1885 – July 20, 1943) was an archivist, educator, civil servant and political figure in Ontario. He represented Simcoe Centre from 1940 to 1943 in the Legislative Assembly of Ontario as a Liberal.

== Background ==
Born in Dutton, Ontario, McArthur was educated in Dutton, at Queen's University and at Osgoode Hall. He worked at the Dominion Archives of Canada from 1907 to 1912. In 1915, he was called to the Ontario bar and practised law in Toronto for two years. From 1919 to 1922, he was assistant general manager for a trust company. In 1920, McArthur married Floy Lawson.

In 1922, he joined the history department at Queen's University, later serving as department head.

== Government of Ontario ==
Having been in opposition since 1905, the Liberal Party led by Mitchell Hepburn swept back into power in the 1934 provincial election with a substantial majority. Keen to make good on their pledges to cut wasteful spending and to replace the cronies of the ousted Conservatives, soon after the Hepburn ministry was sworn into office, McArthur was announced by education minister Leonard Simpson as the new civil service head of the education department, and that he would assume the responsibilities of the chief director of education and the chief policy advisor to the minister in addition to replacing the incumbent deputy minister.

McArthur was given an unusual level of prominence during his tenure as a senior civil servant. In highlighting his government's accomplishment in speeches to political audience, the Premier would from time to time specifically mentioned McArthur's work in parallel to political ministers. Media reports noted that he served in virtual partnership with Simpson in carrying our reforms in the education system.

In the summer 1940, Simpson unexpectedly died of a heart attack. Four days later in a highly unusual move, Premier Hepburn appointed McArthur, the department's civil service head, to succeed his political master directly. A month later in an even more unusual move, the Premier called the by-election for the seat left vacant by Simpsons with McArthur as the candidate, in hopes of the opposition being deterred by the ongoing war from contesting the by-election. The bet played out as the Premier expected. McArthur was returned by acclamation as Simpson's successor in the legislature.

McArthur was retained in cabinet by both of Hepburn successors, Premiers Gordon Conant and Harry Nixon, and held the education portfolio through the tumultuous period of Liberal Party infighting between 1942 and 1943. However, it was the shortest ministry in Ontario's history, the three-month Nixon ministry, that he did not managed to serve through. Two weeks before Liberals' spectacular defeat in the 1943 election, McArthur unexpectedly died of a heart attack at his summer home at Grand Bend on Lake Huron at the age of 58.

=== Ministerial and parliamentary offices ===
Hepburn ministry, Province of Ontario (1934–1942)
Conant ministry, Province of Ontario (1942–1943)
Nixon ministry, Province of Ontario (1943)
Preceded by Leonard Simpson	Minister of Education; 1940-1943	Succeeded by George Drew
Legislative Assembly of Ontario
Preceded by Leonard Simpson	Member of Simcoe Centre; 1940-1943	Succeeded by George Graham Johnston

== Legacy ==
He was the author of several textbooks and contributed to the Cambridge History of the British Empire.

Duncan McArthur Hall at Queen's University, which houses the university's Faculty of Education, was named in his honour, as was Duncan McArthur Public School, also in Kingston (now closed).
