= James Stoddart Duff =

Canadian politician (1856–1916)

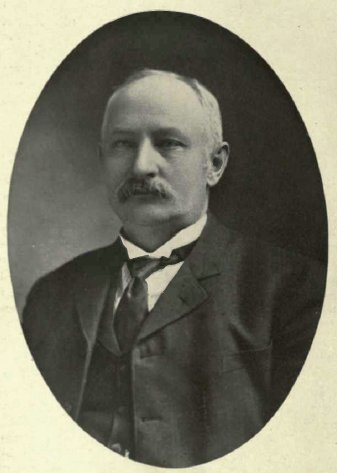

Ontario MPP
- In office 1898–1916
- Preceded by: Archibald Currie
- Succeeded by: William Torrance Allen
- Constituency: Simcoe West

Personal details
- Born: June 20, 1856 Cookstown, Canada West
- Died: November 17, 1916 (aged 60) Alliston, Ontario
- Party: Conservative
- Occupation: Farmer

James Stoddart Duff (June 20, 1856 – November 17, 1916) was an Ontario farmer and political figure. He represented Simcoe West in the Legislative Assembly of Ontario as a Conservative member from 1898 to 1916.

He was born near Cookstown, Canada East, the son of John Duff, an Irish immigrant, and Eliza Jane Stoddart. Duff was educated at Collingwood College. He married Jane Bell Stoddard. He served on the municipal council for Essa Township. Duff ran unsuccessfully against Archibald S. Currie in 1894 before defeating Currie in 1898. He was Minister of Agriculture from 1908 to 1916. Duff died in office in Alliston, Ontario at the age of 60.
