= George Prevost McKay =

Canadian politician (1840–1924)

Ontario MPP
- In office 1883–1886
- Preceded by: William James Parkhill
- Succeeded by: Riding abolished
- Constituency: Simcoe South

Personal details
- Born: February 7, 1840 West Gwillinbury Township, Simcoe County, Upper Canada
- Died: August 22, 1924 (aged 84) Toronto, Ontario
- Party: Conservative
- Spouse: Susie Douse
- Occupation: Businessman

George Prevost McKay (February 7, 1840 – August 22, 1924) was an Ontario businessman and political figure. He represented Simcoe South in the Legislative Assembly of Ontario as a Conservative member from 1883 to 1886.

McKay was born in West Gwillinbury Township, Simcoe County, Upper Canada in 1840, the son of D. Grant McKay, who came to Upper Canada from New Brunswick. He married Susie Douse and opened one of the first stores in Lefroy. He also served as reeve for Innisfil Township. In 1883, he moved to Toronto, where he worked for the Credit-Foncier Loan Company. He died there in 1924.
