= Alfred Burke Thompson =

Canadian politician

Member of Parliament for Simcoe East
- In office 1925–1935
- Preceded by: Manley Chew
- Succeeded by: George Alexander McLean

Ontario MPP
- In office 1905–1919
- Preceded by: David Davidson
- Succeeded by: Gilbert Hugh Murdoch
- In office 1898–1902
- Preceded by: Robert Paton
- Succeeded by: David Davidson
- Constituency: Simcoe Centre

Personal details
- Born: July 18, 1862 Penetanguishene, Canada West
- Died: August 2, 1942 (aged 80) Penetanguishene, Ontario
- Party: Conservative
- Spouses: Kate Worthington May (m. 1889; died 1894) Alberta Marie McFadyen (m. 1914; died 1921)
- Children: 4
- Occupation: Lawyer

Alfred Burke Thompson (July 18, 1862 – August 2, 1942) was a barrister and solicitor, community leader, and political figure in Ontario, Canada. He represented Simcoe Centre, as a Conservative, in the Legislative Assembly of Ontario from 1898 to 1902 and from 1905 to 1919. He sat as the Member of Parliament for Simcoe East in the House of Commons of Canada, from 1925 to 1935, as a Conservative.

Thompson was born in Penetanguishene, Canada West, the son of town mayor Alfred Andrew Thompson and the grandson of William Thompson. He received an elite education at Upper Canada College and the University of Toronto. He was active in athletics as well as academics, being captain of the cricket team at UCC and playing varsity rugby at U of T.

Thompson served in the military forces. He was in the Queen's Own Rifles of Canada during the North-West Rebellion of 1885. Later, for many years, he served as a part-time militia officer in the 35th Regiment, The Simcoe Foresters. In 1926, he was a founding member of the Penetanguishene branch of the Canadian Legion of the British Empire Service League (now the Royal Canadian Legion).

In 1889, Thompson married Kate Worthington May (uk-1894). They had no children. A couple of decades after Kate's death, in 1914, Thompson married Alberta Marie McFadyen (1885-1921). He and Alberta had four children: Alfred Burke, Donald, Ruth and William John.

Thompson, in 1909, donated a trophy for competition between the "gentlemen curlers" of Elmvale, Midland and Penetanguishene. This competition eventually died out and the trophy disappeared. In about 1957, the trophy was found in the basement of the Midland Curling Club, and was turned over to Nora Thompson, a daughter-in-law of Thompson's who was herself a curler. It has since been - up to today - a trophy for annual competition between women's curling teams from Elmvale, Midland and Penetanguishene and later Coldwater too.

Thompson died on August 2, 1942, at the Penetanguishene General Hospital, following a short illness. It was reported that he had been experiencing “increasing anxiety” ever since his eldest son, who too was named Alfred Burke Thompson, had become a prisoner-of-war of the Germans in September 1939. His remains are interred in the cemetery at the historic St. James on-the-Lines Anglican Church, Penetanguishene.

== Electoral record (in Dominion elections) ==
1925 Canadian federal election: Simcoe East
Party	Candidate	Votes
Conservative	Alfred Burke Thompson	7,658
Liberal	Thomas Edward Manley Chew	6,929

1926 Canadian federal election: Simcoe East
Party	Candidate	Votes
Conservative	Alfred Burke Thompson	7,994
Liberal	Fred W. Grant	7,669

1930 Canadian federal election: Simcoe East
Party	Candidate	Votes
Conservative	Alfred Burke Thompson	7,974
Liberal	George McLean	7,629
