= Robert Paton (politician) =

Canadian politician

Ontario MPP
- In office 1890–1898
- Preceded by: Orson James Phelps
- Succeeded by: Alfred Burke Thompson
- Constituency: Simcoe Centre

Personal details
- Born: October 10, 1839 Halton County, Upper Canada
- Died: June 17, 1917 (aged 77) Simcoe, Ontario
- Party: Liberal
- Spouse: Amelia Anne Dewar (m. 1866)
- Occupation: Farmer

Robert Paton (October 10, 1839 – June 17, 1917) was an Ontario farmer, merchant and political figure. He represented Simcoe Centre in the Legislative Assembly of Ontario as a Liberal from 1890 to 1898.

He was born in Halton County, Upper Canada in 1839, the son of Peter Paton. The family later moved to New Lowell in Simcoe County, where his father became the first postmaster. Paton was involved in the lumber trade, farming and raising livestock in partnership with his uncle Robert Hay. In 1866, he married Amelia Anne Dewar. He served as reeve of Sunnidale Township from 1874 to 1888 and was warden for Simcoe County in 1885.
