= David Davidson (Canadian politician) =

Canadian politician

Ontario MPP
- In office 1902–1904
- Preceded by: Alfred Burke Thompson
- Succeeded by: Alfred Burke Thompson
- Constituency: Simcoe Centre

Personal details
- Born: August 29, 1839 Halton County, Upper Canada
- Died: December 10, 1909 (aged 70)
- Party: Liberal
- Spouse: D. M. Belyea (m. 1866)
- Children: 3
- Occupation: Merchant

David Davidson (August 29, 1839 – December 10, 1909) was a lumberman and politician in Ontario, Canada. He represented Simcoe Centre in the Legislative Assembly of Ontario from 1902 to 1904 as a Liberal.

The son of John and Hannah Davidson, he was born in Nelson township, Halton County, Upper Canada and was educated in Burlington. In 1866, he married D. M. Belyea. He served as deputy reeve for Tiny township. Davidson ran unsuccessfully for a seat in the Ontario assembly in 1898.
