= Orson James Phelps =

Canadian politician (1820–1897)

Ontario MPP
- In office 1886–1890
- Preceded by: New riding
- Succeeded by: Robert Paton
- Constituency: Simcoe Centre
- In office 1883–1886
- Preceded by: Thomas Long
- Succeeded by: Thomas Wylie
- Constituency: Simcoe West

Personal details
- Born: February 23, 1820 New York
- Died: May 13, 1897 (aged 77) St. Catharines, Ontario
- Party: Liberal
- Spouse: Jane Meade (m. 1844)
- Occupation: Merchant

Orson James Phelps (February 23, 1820 – May 13, 1897) was an Ontario merchant and political figure. He represented Simcoe West from 1883 to 1886 and Simcoe Centre from 1886 to 1890 in the Legislative Assembly of Ontario as a Liberal member.

He was born in New York state in 1820 and came to Grantham Township in Upper Canada with his family in 1833. In 1844, he married Jane Meade. Phelps served in the local militia during the Upper Canada Rebellion. From 1845 to 1852, he served as government inspector during the building of harbours at Port Dalhousie and Port Colborne. He was a lumber merchant and built a sawmill in Flos township in 1870; the community that developed nearby became known as Phelpston. Phelps served as reeve for Grant and Flos townships and was warden for Simcoe County in 1881. He ran unsuccessfully for the provincial seat in Simcoe West in 1879; he was elected in the general election of 1883. That election was declared invalid after an appeal but he was reelected in the subsequent by-election. In 1890, he was named sheriff for Simcoe County, serving until 1894. He died at St. Catharines in 1897.
