= Edgar James Evans =

Canadian politician from Ontario

Member of the Ontario Provincial Parliament for Simcoe South
- In office October 20, 1919 – May 10, 1923
- Preceded by: Alexander Ferguson
- Succeeded by: William Earl Rowe

Personal details
- Party: United Farmers

Edgar James Evans was a Canadian politician from Ontario. He represented Simcoe South in the Legislative Assembly of Ontario from 1919 to 1923.

== See also ==
- 15th Parliament of Ontario
