= Charles Ernest Wright =

Canadian politician from Ontario

Member of the Ontario Provincial Parliament for Simcoe Centre
- In office June 25, 1923 – September 17, 1929
- Preceded by: Gilbert Hugh Murdoch
- Succeeded by: Leonard Jennett Simpson

Personal details
- Party: Conservative

Charles Ernest Wright was a Canadian politician from the Conservative Party of Ontario. He represented Simcoe Centre in the Legislative Assembly of Ontario from 1923 to 1929.

== See also ==
- 16th Parliament of Ontario
- 17th Parliament of Ontario
