= Thomas Roberts Ferguson =

Canadian politician

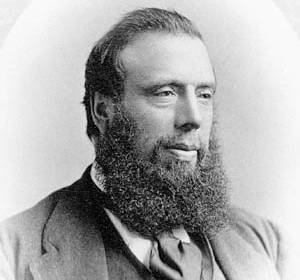

Member of Parliament for Cardwell
- In office 1867–1872
- Succeeded by: John Hillyard Cameron

Ontario MPP
- In office 1867–1873
- Preceded by: Riding established
- Succeeded by: D'Arcy Boulton
- Constituency: Simcoe South

Personal details
- Born: December 1818 Drumcor, County Cavan, Ireland
- Died: September 15, 1879 (aged 60) Innisfil Township, Ontario, Canada
- Party: Conservative (Federal); Conservative (Provincial)
- Relations: Emily Murphy, niece
- Occupation: Businessman

Thomas Roberts Ferguson (December 1818 – September 15, 1879) was an Ontario businessman and political figure. He represented Cardwell in the Legislative Assembly of Ontario from 1867 to 1873 and Cardwell in the House of Commons of Canada as a Conservative member from 1867 to 1872.

His niece was women's rights activist Emily Murphy (née Ferguson), one of "The Famous Five".

== Life and career ==
Thomas Roberts Ferguson was born in County Cavan, Ireland in 1818 and came to Canada with his family during the 1830s. They settled near Cookstown and he became a farmer and later a merchant there. He was a member of the Orange Order, becoming deputy grand master in 1858. Ferguson was a member of the council for Innisfil Township from 1852 to 1873, serving as reeve for 18 years. In 1858, he was elected to represent South Simcoe in the Legislative Assembly of the Province of Canada and served until Confederation. He supported representation by population. Ferguson also served as an officer in the local militia and became a lieutenant-colonel in 1865, participating in the defense against the Fenian raids. He was elected to both the Ontario legislature and the House of Commons (Cardwell in 1867 and was re-elected by acclamation to the provincial assembly in 1872. In the same year, he was struck on the head while attempting to stop a fight at a political meeting at Bradford and was forced to resign his seat in 1873 due to incapacity. He was appointed customs collector at Collingwood but was dismissed in 1876 after the Liberals came into power. He died at Cookstown in 1879.

== Electoral history ==
1867 Ontario general election: Simcoe South
Party	Candidate	Votes
Conservative	Thomas Roberts Ferguson	Acclaimed
Source: Elections Ontario

1871 Ontario general election: Simcoe South
Party	Candidate	Votes
Conservative	Thomas Roberts Ferguson	Acclaimed
Source: Elections Ontario
