= William James Parkhill =

Canadian politician

Ontario MPP
- In office 1878–1883
- Preceded by: William McDougall
- Succeeded by: George Prevost McKay
- Constituency: Simcoe South

Personal details
- Born: 27 December 1840 County Tyrone, Ireland
- Died: 26 May 1913 (aged 72) Midland, Ontario
- Party: Conservative
- Spouse: Anne Jane Crossley (m. 1862)

William James Parkhill (27 December 1840 – 26 May 1913) was an Ontario political figure. He represented Simcoe South in the Legislative Assembly of Ontario from 1878 to 1883 as a Conservative member.

He was born in County Tyrone, Ireland in 1839 and came to Canada West in 1856. He first settled in Toronto but later worked at lumber camps near Parry Sound. Around 1861, he was hired by William and Robert Henry who were timber merchants operating near King. He was promoted to manager and later ran their sawmill at Randwick. In 1862, he married Anne Jane Crossley, who later ran the general store in Randwick. Parkhill was the first postmaster for the village and served as reeve for Mulmur Township in 1877.

Parkhill was elected to the provincial assembly in 1878 after William McDougall resigned to take a seat in the federal parliament and was reelected in the general election that followed. He was Grand Master for the Orange Lodge of Ontario West and Deputy Grand Master for the Grand Lodge of British America. In 1899, he was named customs collector at Midland and served in that post until his death in 1913.

== Electoral history ==
Ontario provincial by-election, October 1878: Simcoe South Resignation of William McDougall
| Party | Candidate | Votes | Elected |
|---|---|---|---|
| Conservative | William James Parkhill | Unknown | ✓ |
| Independent | J.H.W. Wilson | Unknown | |
| Conservative gain from Independent Liberal | | | |
Source: History of the Electoral Districts, Legislatures and Ministries of the Province of Ontario
