= Thomas Long (Ontario politician) =

Canadian politician

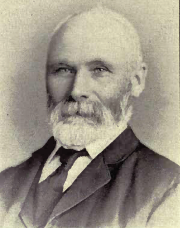

Ontario MPP
- In office 1875–1883
- Preceded by: New riding
- Succeeded by: Orson James Phelps
- Constituency: Simcoe West

Personal details
- Born: August 7, 1836 Limerick, Ireland
- Died: October 9, 1920 (aged 84) Toronto, Ontario
- Party: Conservative
- Spouse: Ann Patton (m. 1861)
- Occupation: Merchant

Thomas Long (August 7, 1836 – October 9, 1920) was an Ontario merchant and political figure. He represented Simcoe West in the Legislative Assembly of Ontario as a Conservative from 1875 to 1883.

He was born in County Limerick, Ireland in 1836, began his education there and went to Simcoe County in Canada West in 1850, where he apprenticed with a merchant. He finished his schooling in Buffalo, New York. Long moved to Collingwood in 1857, where he managed a store for merchants before going into business for himself the following year. He married Ann Patton in 1861. In 1868, his brother joined him in the business, which include the sale of dry goods, clothing and groceries, a flour mill and steamboats. He served on the town council from 1864 to 1870. Long was a director of the Lake Superior Navigation Company and of the Georgian Bay Transportation Company. He died at Toronto in 1920.

== Electoral history ==
1875 Ontario general election: Simcoe West
Party	Candidate	Votes	%
Conservative	Thomas Long	1,353	51.15
Liberal	T.D. McConkey	1,292	48.85
Total valid votes		2,645	67.63
Eligible voters		3,911	
Conservative pickup new district.			
Source: Elections Ontario
