= William Torrance Allen =

Canadian politician from Ontario

Member of the Ontario Provincial Parliament for Simcoe West
- In office January 15, 1917 – May 10, 1923
- Preceded by: James Stoddart Duff
- Succeeded by: James Edgar Jamieson

Personal details
- Party: Conservative

William Torrance Allen was a Canadian politician from the Conservative Party of Ontario. He represented Simcoe West in the Legislative Assembly of Ontario from 1917 by-election until the 1923 Ontario general election.

== See also ==
- 14th Parliament of Ontario
- 15th Parliament of Ontario
