= Alexander Ferguson =

Canadian politician

Ontario MPP
- In office 1908–1919
- Preceded by: New riding
- Succeeded by: Edgar James Evans
- Constituency: Simcoe South
- In office 1906–1908
- Preceded by: Edward Alfred Little
- Succeeded by: Riding abolished
- Constituency: Cardwell

Personal details
- Born: February 23, 1860 Collingwood, Canada West
- Died: March 25, 1925 (aged 65) Schomberg, Ontario
- Party: Conservative
- Occupation: Farmer

Alexander Ferguson (February 23, 1860 – March 3, 1925) was a farmer and politician in Ontario, Canada. He represented Cardwell from 1906 to 1908 and Simcoe South from 1908 to 1919 in the Legislative Assembly of Ontario as a Conservative member.

He was educated in Collingwood. Ferguson was elected to the Ontario assembly by acclamation in a 1906 by-election held after Edward Alfred Little resigned his seat.

He died at Schomberg, Ontario in 1925.
