= George Graham Johnston =

Canadian politician

Ontario MPP
- In office 1943–1960
- Preceded by: Duncan McArthur
- Succeeded by: Art Evans
- Constituency: Simcoe Centre

Personal details
- Born: April 15, 1882; Minesing, Ontario
- Died: May 29, 1960 (aged 78); Barrie, Ontario
- Political party: Progressive Conservative
- Spouse: Alice Mary Young
- Occupation: Manufacturer

George Graham Johnston (April 15, 1882 – May 29, 1960) was a politician in Ontario, Canada. He was a Progressive Conservative member of the Legislative Assembly of Ontario from 1943 to 1960 who represented the riding of Simcoe Centre.

== Background ==
Johnston was born in Minesing, Ontario, he was a manufacturer. Johnston died in office in 1960 from a heart attack.

== Politics ==
Johnston ran as the Progressive Conservative candidate in the 1943 Ontario general election. He defeated Liberal O.E. Todd by 584 votes. He was re-elected five times before his death in 1960.
