= Thomas Wylie =

Canadian politician

Ontario MPP
- In office 1886–1894
- Preceded by: Orson James Phelps
- Succeeded by: Archibald Currie
- Constituency: Simcoe West

Personal details
- Born: June 4, 1841 Victoria, Chinguacousy Township, Peel County, Canada West
- Died: June 25, 1915 (aged 73) York, Ontario, Canada
- Party: Conservative
- Spouse: Catherine Ferguson (m. 1867)
- Occupation: Physician

Thomas Wylie (June 4, 1841 – July 10, 1915) was an Ontario physician and political figure. He represented Simcoe West in the Legislative Assembly of Ontario as a Conservative member from 1886 to 1894.

He was born in Toronto in 1841, the son of John Wylie, a Scottish immigrant. Wylie studied medicine at John Rolph's Toronto School of Medicine, graduating with an M.D. in 1866. In 1867, he married Catherine Ferguson. He practiced medicine in Toronto and Stayner.
