= D'Arcy Boulton (Ontario politician) =

Canadian politician

Ontario MPP
- In office 1873–1875
- Preceded by: Thomas Roberts Ferguson
- Succeeded by: William McDougall
- Constituency: Simcoe South

Personal details
- Born: March 29, 1825 Perth, Upper Canada
- Died: February 16, 1875 (aged 49) Toronto, Ontario
- Party: Conservative
- Relations: G. D'Arcy Boulton, grandfather
- Occupation: Lawyer

D'Arcy Boulton (March 29, 1825 – February 16, 1875) was a Canadian lawyer, politician and Orangeman. He was the son of James Boulton and the grandson of G. D'Arcy Boulton.

== Life and career ==
He was born in Perth, Upper Canada, in 1825 and educated at Upper Canada College in Toronto. In 1847, he was admitted to the bar.

In 1864, he became the deputy grandmaster for the Orange Order in British North America; he became the provincial grandmaster for Ontario West in 1870. In 1873, at Glasgow, he became president of the Triennial Orange Conference of the British Empire.

He was elected to the Legislative Assembly of Ontario in a by-election in Simcoe South in 1873. In 1874, he became grandmaster of the Grand Black Chapter of British America, an exclusive Orange order. He died in Toronto in 1875.

== Electoral history ==
=== Federal ===
1867 Canadian federal election: Grey North
Party	Candidate	Votes
Liberal	George Snider	1,399
Unknown	D'Arcy Boulton	1,143
Eligible voters		3,478
Source: Canadian Parliamentary Guide, 1871

=== Provincial ===
Ontario provincial by-election, January 1874: Simcoe South Resignation of Thomas Roberts Ferguson
Party	Candidate	Votes	%
Conservative	D'Arcy Boulton	1,622	54.12
Independent	T. Saunders	1,375	45.88
Total valid votes		2,997	100.0
Conservative hold			
Source: History of the Electoral Districts, Legislatures and Ministries of the Province of Ontario

1875 Ontario general election: Simcoe South
Party	Candidate	Votes	%	±%
Conservative	D'Arcy Boulton	1,057	58.17	+4.05
Liberal	R. Snelling	760	41.83	
Total valid votes		1,817	67.15	
Eligible voters		2,706		
Conservative hold		Swing		+4.05
Source: Elections Ontario

Government offices
Preceded by Stephen Heward	Auditor General of Land Patents for Upper Canada; 1828–1835	Succeeded by position abolished
