= James Edgar Jamieson =

Canadian politician

Ontario MPP
- In office 1929–1934
- Preceded by: John Henry Mitchell
- Succeeded by: Riding abolished
- Constituency: Simcoe Southwest
- In office 1923–1926
- Preceded by: William Torrance Allen
- Succeeded by: Riding abolished
- Constituency: Simcoe West

Personal details
- Born: July 20, 1873 Mulmur, Ontario
- Died: June 17, 1958 (aged 84)
- Party: Conservative
- Spouse: Sarah M. Crisp (m. 1902)
- Occupation: Farmer

James Edgar Jamieson (July 20, 1873 – June 17, 1958) was an Ontario farmer and political figure. He represented Simcoe West from 1923 to 1926 and Simcoe Southwest from 1929 to 1934 in the Legislative Assembly of Ontario as a Conservative member.

He was born in Mulmur Corners, Mulmur, Ontario. In 1902, he married Sarah M. Crisp, a local schoolteacher. He owned a farm at Singhampton, later moving south of Collingwood. Jamieson served as reeve for Nottawasaga Township. He served thirty years on the executive of the Ontario Good Roads Association and was president in 1935. He was part of a group which convinced the provincial government to raise the hull of HMS Nancy and erect a building over it on Nancy Island near Wasaga Beach.
