= Archibald Currie (Canadian politician) =

Canadian politician

Ontario MPP
- In office 1894–1898
- Preceded by: Thomas Wylie
- Succeeded by: James Stoddart Duff
- Constituency: Simcoe West

Personal details
- Born: February 25, 1853 Victoria County, Canada West
- Died: May 16, 1930 (aged 77) Creemore, Ontario
- Party: Liberal-Patrons of Industry
- Spouse: Annie Macham (m. 1882; died 1886)
- Children: 3
- Occupation: Farmer

Archibald S. Currie (February 25, 1853 – May 16, 1930) was an Ontario farmer and political figure. He represented Simcoe West in the Legislative Assembly of Ontario from 1894 to 1898 as a Liberal-Patrons of Industry member.

He was born in Mariposa Township, Victoria County, Canada West on February 25, 1853, the son of Scottish immigrants. In 1857, he moved with his parents to Nottawasaga Township in Simcoe County where they settled on Lot 12, Con 4, just north of Creemore. In 1882, he married Annie Macham and they had three children. When Annie died suddenly in 1886, Currie sold the farm and moved to 3 Nelson Street in Creemore. He carried on an insurance business in Creemore. He served on the township council. He served one term and was defeated by James Stoddart Duff in his bid for reelection in 1898. He died in Creemore on May 16, 1930, and is buried in the Creemore Union Cemetery.
