= Ministry of Education (Ontario) =

Provincial government department in Canada

- Ministère de l'Éducation (French)
- Government of Ontario wordmark

Ministry overview
- Formed: 1876 (as Department of Education); 1999 (in current form)
- Preceding agencies: Department of Public Instruction (1850–1876); Ministry of Education and Training (1993–1999)
- Jurisdiction: Government of Ontario
- Headquarters: 315 Front Street West 14th Floor Toronto, Ontario M7A 0B8; 43°39′48.11″N 79°23′15.5″W
- Employees: 1,700+
- Annual budget: $34.5 billion (2022–2023 fiscal year)
- Minister responsible: Paul Calandra, Minister of Education
- Website: ontario.ca/edu

The Ministry of Education (French: Ministère de l'Éducation) is the ministry of the Government of Ontario responsible for government policy, funding, curriculum planning and direction in all levels of public education, including elementary and secondary schools.

The ministry is responsible for curriculum and guidelines for all officially recognized elementary and secondary schools in the province and some outside the province. The ministry is also responsible for public and separate school boards across Ontario, but are not involved in the day-to-day operations.

The current minister of education is Paul Calandra.

A number of ministers of education have gone on to become premier of Ontario, including Arthur Sturgis Hardy, George Ross, John Robarts, Bill Davis, and Kathleen Wynne. Four premiers held the education portfolio themselves while premier. They were Howard Ferguson, George Henry, George Drew and John Robarts. All four of them served as their own education minister for the full duration of their premiership.

== History ==
Prior to Confederation, the supervision of the education system and the development of education policy of Canada West were the responsibilities of the Department of Public Instruction.

In 1844, Governor General Sir Charles Metcalfe appointed Egerton Ryerson as the Chief Superintendent of Education for Upper Canada with a mandate to widen the reach of secular public schools. The Common School Act, 1846 prepared by Ryerson formally established the position along with a preliminary structure of a central education authority with a supervisory board of seven members. The act also mandated the used of common textbooks, teacher training, school inspectors, and local governance through elected school trustees.

The 1846 act was followed by the Common School Act, 1850, which provided appropriation for the department to be headed by the chief superintendent and formalized a Council of Public Instruction. The department came to be known as the Department of Public Instruction. The act also enabled school tax to be levied on all property, provided for the free admission of all children to schools. It also included the controversial provision authoring the creation of separate schools for "Protestants, Roman Catholics, or coloured people" upon the application of twelve or more families. Ryerson has long been an opponent to segregation in schools, saying at the time that that enshrining racial and religious bias into law would be "a disgrace to our Legislature", and attempted to force school boards establishing segregated schools to admit Black students, encouraging their families to mount lawsuits when they wouldn't.

The 1850 legislation prescribed that the chief superintendent be responsible to a portfolio minister of the province. Ryerson was of the belief that educational issues should not be subject to politics, and he made his department a semi-autonomous agency with no ministerial head specified. Though formally responsible to the Executive Council, Ryerson established policy, sought political support for it inside and outside parliament throughout his time in office as a minister would. Even after confederation, Ryerson's competence, strong will and long tenure deterred premiers of the new province from formally appointing an education minister before his retirement in 1876. In a letter commenting on Premier John S Macdonald's defeat and resignation, Prime Minister John A Macdonald wrote to John Carling, a minister in his cabinet, noted that he had pressed the premier to name an education minister and lamented that the premier took no steps towards doing so.

In February 1876 upon Ryerson's retirement, Premier Oliver Mowat formally instituted the Department of Education, the first newly created ministerial portfolio in Ontario ministry (all existing portfolios at the time were named in the British North America Act) to assume the responsibility of the Department of Public Instruction and the authorities formerly held by the chief superintendent of education. Mowat named his Treasurer Adam Crooks, who served as vice-chancellor of the University of Toronto prior to his election, as its inaugural minister. Crooks was relieved of his treasury duty the following year to focus in the education portfolio.

Responsibilities for post-secondary education were part of the department's portfolio prior to 1964 when the Department of University Affairs was created. The Department of Education continued to be responsible for post-secondary education in applied arts and technology until 1971 when the responsibility was transferred to the renamed Department of Colleges and Universities.

In 1972, the Department of Education was renamed the Ministry of Education. The ministry again oversaw post-secondary education between 1993 and 1999.

== Reports ==
=== Hall-Dennis Report, 1968 ===
The Hall-Dennis Report, officially titled Living and Learning, called for broad reforms to Ontario education, to empower teachers and the larger community, and put students' needs and dignity at the centre of education.

=== Fullan Report, 2013 ===
The Fullan Report, officially titled Great to Excellent, calls for a focus on the 6 C's: Character, Citizenship, Communication, Critical thinking and problem solving, Collaboration and teamwork, and Creativity and imagination. The report also calls for innovation in how these areas are learned.

== Ministers ==
Portrait	Name	Term of office		Tenure	Political party (Ministry)	Note
	Adam Crooks	February 19, 1876	November 23, 1883	7 years, 277 days	Liberal (Mowat)	
	George Ross	November 23, 1883	July 21, 1896	15 years, 332 days	Liberal (Mowat)	
	George Ross	July 21, 1896	October 21, 1899	15 years, 332 days	Liberal (Hardy)	
	Richard Harcourt	October 21, 1899	February 8, 1905	5 years, 110 days	Liberal (Ross)	
	Robert Pyne	February 8, 1905	September 25, 1914	13 years, 104 days	Conservative (Whitney)	
	Robert Pyne	September 25, 1914	May 23, 1918	13 years, 104 days	Conservative (Hearst)	
	Henry John Cody	May 23, 1918	November 14, 1919	1 year, 175 days	Conservative (Hearst)	
	Robert Grant	November 14, 1919	November 16, 1923	4 years, 2 days	United Farmers (Drury)	
	Howard Ferguson	July 16, 1923	December 15, 1930	7 years, 152 days	Conservative (Ferguson)	While Premier
	George Henry	December 15, 1930	July 10, 1934	3 years, 207 days	Conservative (Henry)	While Premier
	Leonard Simpson	July 10, 1934	August 18, 1940	6 years, 39 days	Liberal (Hepburn)	
	Duncan McArthur	August 22, 1940	October 21, 1942	8 years, 58 days	Liberal (Hepburn)	
	Duncan McArthur	October 21, 1942	May 18, 1943	8 years, 58 days	Liberal (Conant)	
	Duncan McArthur	May 18, 1943	July 20, 1943	8 years, 58 days	Liberal (Nixon)	
	George Drew	August 17, 1943	October 19, 1948	5 years, 63 days	PC (Drew)	While Premier
	Dana Porter	October 19, 1948	May 4, 1949	2 years, 348 days	PC (Kennedy)	
	Dana Porter	May 4, 1949	October 2, 1951	2 years, 348 days	PC (Frost)	
	William Dunlop	October 2, 1951	December 17, 1959	8 years, 76 days	PC (Frost)	
	John Robarts	December 17, 1959	November 8, 1961	2 years, 312 days	PC (Frost)	
	John Robarts	November 8, 1961	October 25, 1962	2 years, 312 days	PC (Robarts)	While Premier
	Bill Davis	October 25, 1962	March 1, 1971	8 years, 127 days	PC (Robarts)	Concurrently Minister of College and Universities after May 14, 1964
	Robert Welch	March 1, 1971	February 2, 1972	338 days	PC (Davis)	While Provincial Secretary of Social Development
	Thomas Wells	February 2, 1972	August 18, 1978	6 years, 197 days	PC (Davis)	
	Bette Stephenson	August 18, 1978	February 8, 1985	6 years, 174 days	PC (Davis)	Concurrently Minister of Colleges and Universities
	Keith Norton	February 8, 1985	May 17, 1985	98 days	PC (Miller)	Concurrently Minister of Colleges and Universities & Provincial Secretary of Social Development
	Larry Grossman	May 17, 1985	June 26, 1985	40 days	PC (Miller)	Concurrently Minister of Colleges and Universities
	Sean Conway	June 26, 1985	September 29, 1987	2 years, 95 days (first instance)	Liberal (Peterson)	
	Christopher Ward	September 29, 1987	August 2, 1989	1 year, 307 days	Liberal (Peterson)	
	Sean Conway	August 2, 1989	October 1, 1990	1 year, 60 days (second instance); 3 year, 155 days in total	Liberal (Peterson)	Concurrently Minister of Colleges and Universities & Minister of Skills Development
	Marion Boyd	October 1, 1990	October 15, 1991	1 year, 14 days	NDP (Rae)	
	Tony Silipo	October 15, 1991	February 3, 1993	1 year, 111 days	NDP (Rae)	
Minister of Education and Training					NDP (Rae)	
	Dave Cooke	February 3, 1993	June 26, 1995	2 years, 143 days	NDP (Rae)	For this period, there is no Minister of Colleges and Universities; Ministry of Education is responsible for all post secondary education, including skills training.
	John Snobelen	June 26, 1995	October 10, 1997	2 years, 106 days	PC (Harris)	For this period, there is no Minister of Colleges and Universities; Ministry of Education is responsible for all post secondary education, including skills training.
	David Johnson	October 10, 1997	June 17, 1999	1 year, 250 days	PC (Harris)	For this period, there is no Minister of Colleges and Universities; Ministry of Education is responsible for all post secondary education, including skills training.
Minister of Education					PC (Harris)	
	Janet Ecker	June 17, 1999	April 14, 2002	2 years, 301 days	PC (Harris)	
	Elizabeth Witmer	April 15, 2002	October 22, 2003	1 year, 190 days	PC (Eves)	
	Gerard Kennedy	October 23, 2003	April 5, 2006	2 years, 164 days	Liberal (McGuinty)	
	Sandra Pupatello	April 5, 2006	September 18, 2006	166 days	Liberal (McGuinty)	
	Kathleen Wynne	September 18, 2006	January 18, 2010	3 years, 122 days	Liberal (McGuinty)	
	Leona Dombrowsky	January 18, 2010	October 20, 2011	1 year, 275 days	Liberal (McGuinty)	
	Laurel Broten	October 20, 2011	February 11, 2013	1 year, 114 days	Liberal (McGuinty)	
	Liz Sandals	February 11, 2013	June 13, 2016	3 years, 123 days	Liberal (Wynne)	
	Mitzie Hunter	June 13, 2016	January 17, 2018	1 year, 218 days	Liberal (Wynne)	Indira Naidoo-Harris served as Associate Minister of Education (Early Years and Child Care) from August 24, 2016 to January 17, 2017.
	Indira Naidoo-Harris	January 17, 2018	June 29, 2018	163 days	Liberal (Wynne)	
	Lisa Thompson	June 29, 2018	June 20, 2019	356 days	PC (Ford)	
	Stephen Lecce	June 20, 2019	June 6, 2024	4 years, 352 days	PC (Ford)	
	Todd Smith	June 6, 2024	August 16, 2024	71 days	PC (Ford)	
	Jill Dunlop	August 16, 2024	March 19, 2025	215 days	PC (Ford)	
	Paul Calandra	March 19, 2025	present	1 year, 197 days	PC (Ford)	

== Approach to discipline ==
Ontario public schools use progressive discipline. Discipline is corrective and supportive rather than punitive, with a focus on prevention and early intervention. It is a whole-school, systemic approach, engaging students, families and the larger community, as well as classes, schools and boards. Schools are to recognize and respect the diversity of parent communities, and partner with them accordingly. Students are surveyed at least every two years about their experience of the school climate.

"For students with special education needs, interventions, supports, and consequences must be consistent with the student’s strengths and needs".

While the school principal is responsible for discipline, all board employees who come into contact with students are responsible for stepping in if inappropriate behaviour occurs. The principal may also delegate powers and duties related to discipline.

== Ministry agencies ==
- Association Des Enseignants Franco-Ontariens (AEFO) Employee Life and Health Trust
- Council of the College of Early Childhood Educators
- Council of The Ontario College of Teachers
- Cupe Education Workers' Benefits Trust
- Education Quality and Accountability Office
- Education Relations Commission
- Elementary Teachers' Federation of Ontario (ETFO) Employee Life and Health Trust
- Languages of Instruction Commission of Ontario
- Ministers' Advisory Council On Special Education
- Ontario Educational Communications Authority (TVO)
- Ontario English Catholic Teachers' Association (OECTA) Employee Life and Health Trust
- TFO
- Ontario Non-Union Teachers' Trust
- Ontario Teachers' Pension Plan Board
- OSSTF Employee Life and Health Trust
- Provincial Schools Authority

== See also ==
- Education in Ontario
- Ministry of Colleges and Universities
- List of school districts in Ontario
