= George William Taylor =

Canadian politician

The Honourable George Taylor KC, ECO

Ontario MPP
- In office 1977–1985
- Preceded by: David Evans
- Succeeded by: Earl Rowe
- Constituency: Simcoe Centre

Personal details
- Born: November 5, 1937 (age 88) Hamilton, Ontario
- Party: Progressive Conservative
- Profession: Lawyer

George William Taylor, KC (born November 5, 1937) is a former politician in Ontario, Canada. He served in the Legislative Assembly of Ontario from 1977 to 1985, and was a cabinet minister in the government of William Davis. Taylor was a member of the Progressive Conservative Party.

== Background ==
Taylor was born in Hamilton, Ontario, and educated at McMaster University (received a Bachelor of Arts degree in 1960) and the Osgoode Hall Law School. He practiced as a lawyer in Barrie, taught business law at Georgian College for ten years, and was named a Queen's Counsel in 1977. As of 2005, he is director of the United Appeal in Barrie, director of the Barrie YM-YWCA and campaign chairman for the Canadian Cancer Society. He also plays with the Barrie Oldtimers Hockey Team.

== Politics ==
He was elected to the Ontario legislature in the 1977 provincial election, defeating New Democratic Party candidate Paul Wessenger by 5,434 votes in Simcoe Centre. He served as a government backbench supporter for the next four years, and was re-elected in the 1981 election. He was named to Davis's cabinet on February 13, 1982 as Solicitor General. Taylor supported Larry Grossman's bid to succeed Davis as party leader, and was dropped from cabinet when Frank Miller became Premier of Ontario on February 8, 1985. He did not run for re-election in 1985.

=== Cabinet ===
Davis ministry, Province of Ontario (1971–1985)
Cabinet post (1)
Predecessor	Office	Successor
Roy McMurtry	Solicitor General; 1982–1985	John Williams

== After politics ==
Taylor returned to his legal practice after leaving the legislature. In 2001, he was appointed to the Ontario Rental Housing Tribunal by the government of Mike Harris.
