= William McDougall (Ontario politician) =

Canadian Father of Confederation (1822–1905)

The Honourable William McDougall PC CB
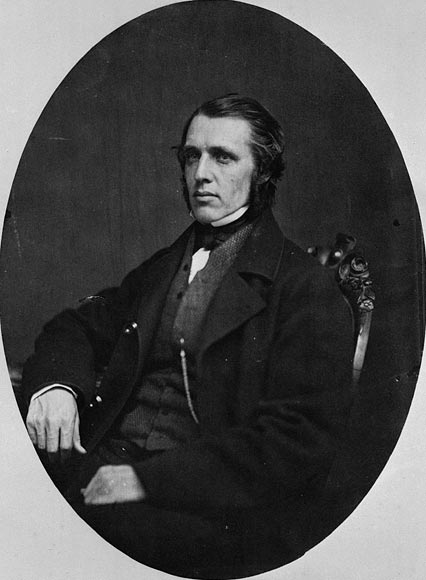

Member of the Canadian Parliament for Lanark North
- In office 1867–1872
- Succeeded by: Daniel Galbraith

Member of the Canadian Parliament for Halton
- In office 1878–1882
- Preceded by: William McCraney
- Succeeded by: William McCraney

Lieutenant-Governor of Rupert's Land and the North-Western Territory
- In office 1869–1870
- Monarch: Victoria
- Succeeded by: Adams George Archibald

Ontario MPP
- In office 1875–1878
- Preceded by: D'Arcy Boulton
- Succeeded by: William James Parkhill
- Constituency: Simcoe South

Personal details
- Born: January 25, 1822 York, Upper Canada
- Died: May 29, 1905 (aged 83) Ottawa, Ontario, Canada
- Party: Liberal-Conservative
- Spouses: Amelia Caroline Easton (m. 1845; died 1869) Mary Adelaide (Minnie) Beatty (m. 1872)
- Cabinet: Minister of Public Works (1867–1869)

William McDougall (January 25, 1822 – May 29, 1905) was a Canadian lawyer, politician, and one of the Fathers of Confederation.

== Biography ==
William McDougall was born near York, Upper Canada (now Toronto, Ontario) to Daniel McDougall and Hannah Matthews. William was the third generation of United Empire Loyalists to settle in York. In 1793, his paternal great-great-grandparents were among the first twelve families to move to York along with 450 British troops. Those soldiers then built Fort York to protect against American invasion.

McDougall received his education at Victoria College in Cobourg, Upper Canada, and in 1847, began practicing law as an attorney and solicitor in Upper Canada. In 1862, he was called to the Upper Canada Bar.

In 1849, William McDougall's office in Toronto was the meeting place for the Clear Grit political movement. Other Clear Grit supporters included Peter Perry, David Christie, Charles Clarke, Charles Lindsey, and Malcolm Cameron. From 1850 to 1858, he published The North American, a liberal newspaper.

He was elected as a member of the legislative assembly in 1858 and was Commissioner of Crown Lands and Provincial Secretary.

=== Gettysburg Address ===
In 1863, along with Alexander Tilloch Galt, McDougall went to Washington, D.C., to meet with President Abraham Lincoln in order to renegotiate the Reciprocity Treaty. During the visit, Lincoln explained that he had an important event to attend and had to travel to Pennsylvania. The president had then invited McDougall to accompany him on his trip by train and coach. They stayed the night at the private home of David Wills, a wealthy 32-year-old Gettysburg attorney.

On the following day, November 19, an opening ceremony took place at the new Gettysburg cemetery, built for dead soldiers of the American Civil War. While many orators spoke for hours, Lincoln spoke briefly, presenting the Gettysburg Address.

In July 1958, before then–US President Dwight D. Eisenhower addressed a joint session of the Parliament of Canada, Prime Minister John G. Diefenbaker recounted the tale of the friendship between McDougall and Lincoln as an example of the long history of friendship between Canada and the United States. A copy of the Hansard containing Eisenhower's speech was autographed and commented by Diefenbaker, and it can be found in the Baldwin Room – a secured archives area – of the Toronto Reference Library.

=== Confederation Canada ===
McDougall is considered a father of Canadian confederation as he attended all three Confederation conferences. Once the dominion formed, he was Minister of Public Works in the Macdonald government. As he had begun as Liberal and now served under Macdonald's Conservatives, he earned the nickname 'Wandering Willy'.

In the federal election of 1867 he was elected in the district of Lanark North, for the Liberal-Conservative party.

McDougall was appointed Lieutenant Governor of Rupert's Land and the North-Western Territory in 1869. The only practicable travel route at the time was through the United States with the permission of U.S. President Grant. However, when McDougall tried to enter Rupert's Land from the Dakota Territory down the Red River, he was turned back near the border by Louis Riel's troops before he could establish his authority at Fort Garry (now Winnipeg, Manitoba). Dispatches on microfiche at the Main Library of the City of Toronto include his request for 1,000 British troops to be sent on the authority of Queen Victoria. She responded that she would prefer a more amicable settlement of the jurisdiction issue. He returned to Ottawa, and campaigned against Manitoba becoming a province because of its very few inhabitants at that time. The area of Fort Garry was about 50 square miles (130 km^{2}). He also continued to be an interim leader of the North-West provisional government from Ottawa until Adams George Archibald took over on May 10, 1870.

In the federal election of 1872, he ran again for the Liberal-Conservative party in Lanark North but was defeated. In 1875, he was elected to the Parliament of the Province of Ontario. He was an independent-Liberal from June 1, 1875, until September 9, 1878, for the electoral district of Simcoe South.

=== Second marriage and family ===
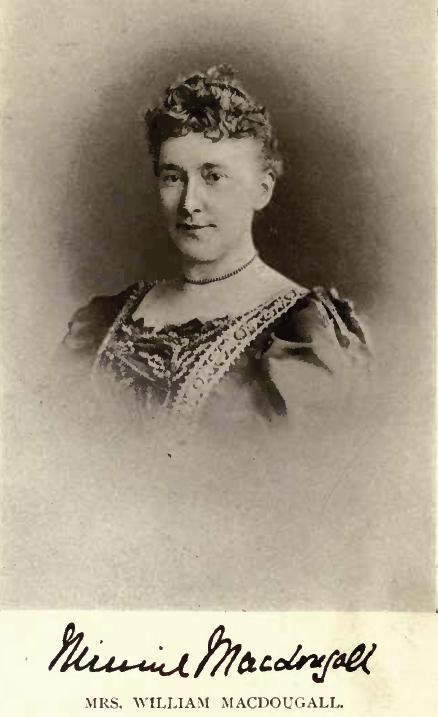
Mrs. William MacDougall

In November 1872, McDougall married his second wife, Mary Adelaide Beatty. She was the daughter of Eleanor and Dr. John Beatty, a professor in Victoria University. She was born and educated at Cobourg, Ontario. Mary was involved in various philanthropic organizations including the Ottawa Humane Society. The couple lived at 407 Wilbrod Street, Ottawa. The couple had three sons, two of whom served with the Canadian contingent during the Boer War in South Africa.

His sister Emily married Liberal Senator David Reesor in 1847.

=== Later life and death ===
In the federal election of 1878, he ran in Halton and was re-elected in the election of 1882 in Algoma and Grenville South in the election of 1887 he was defeated.

In 1890, he was promised a Senate seat, but did not pursue an appointment because his health was failing. During the conferences preceding Confederation, McDougall was personally in favour of electing members to the Senate of Canada. He was also offered a federal judgeship in British Columbia, which he turned down.

He died on May 29, 1905, due to a spine injury caused by walking off a moving train. His remains were interred at Beechwood Cemetery in Ottawa, Ontario.

== Political views ==
McDougall was a Canada First nationalist. He espoused deep anti-Catholic and anti-Aboriginal views. He has also been called "vain, erratic and irredeemably pigheaded".

== Electoral history ==
=== Federal ===
1867 Canadian federal election: Lanark North
Party	Candidate	Votes
Liberal–Conservative	William McDougall, C.B.	acclaimed

1872 Canadian federal election: Lanark North
Party	Candidate	Votes
Liberal	Daniel Galbraith	559
Unknown	Bennett Rosamond	418
Liberal–Conservative	Mr. MacDougall	276

1878 Canadian federal election: Halton
Party	Candidate	Votes	%	±%
Liberal–Conservative	William McDougall	1,708	50.3	+2.3
Liberal	William McCraney	1,690	49.7	-2.3
Total valid votes		3,398	100.0	

1882 Canadian federal election: Algoma
Party	Candidate	Votes	%
Conservative	Simon James Dawson	1,707	60.55
Liberal	William McDougall	1,112	39.45

1887 Canadian federal election: Grenville South
Party	Candidate	Votes
Conservative	Walter Shanly	1,407
Liberal	William McDougall	1,187

=== Provincial ===
Ontario provincial by-election, June 1875: Simcoe South Death of D'Arcy Boulton
Party	Candidate	Votes	%	±%
Independent Liberal	William McDougall	817	60.30	
Independent	G. Dinwoody	538	39.70	
Total valid votes		1,355		
Independent Liberal gain from Conservative		Swing		–
Source: History of the Electoral Districts, Legislatures and Ministries of the Province of Ontario

== See also ==
- List of Northwest Territories premiers
- List of Northwest Territories lieutenant-governors
