= Leonard J. Simpson =

Canadian politician

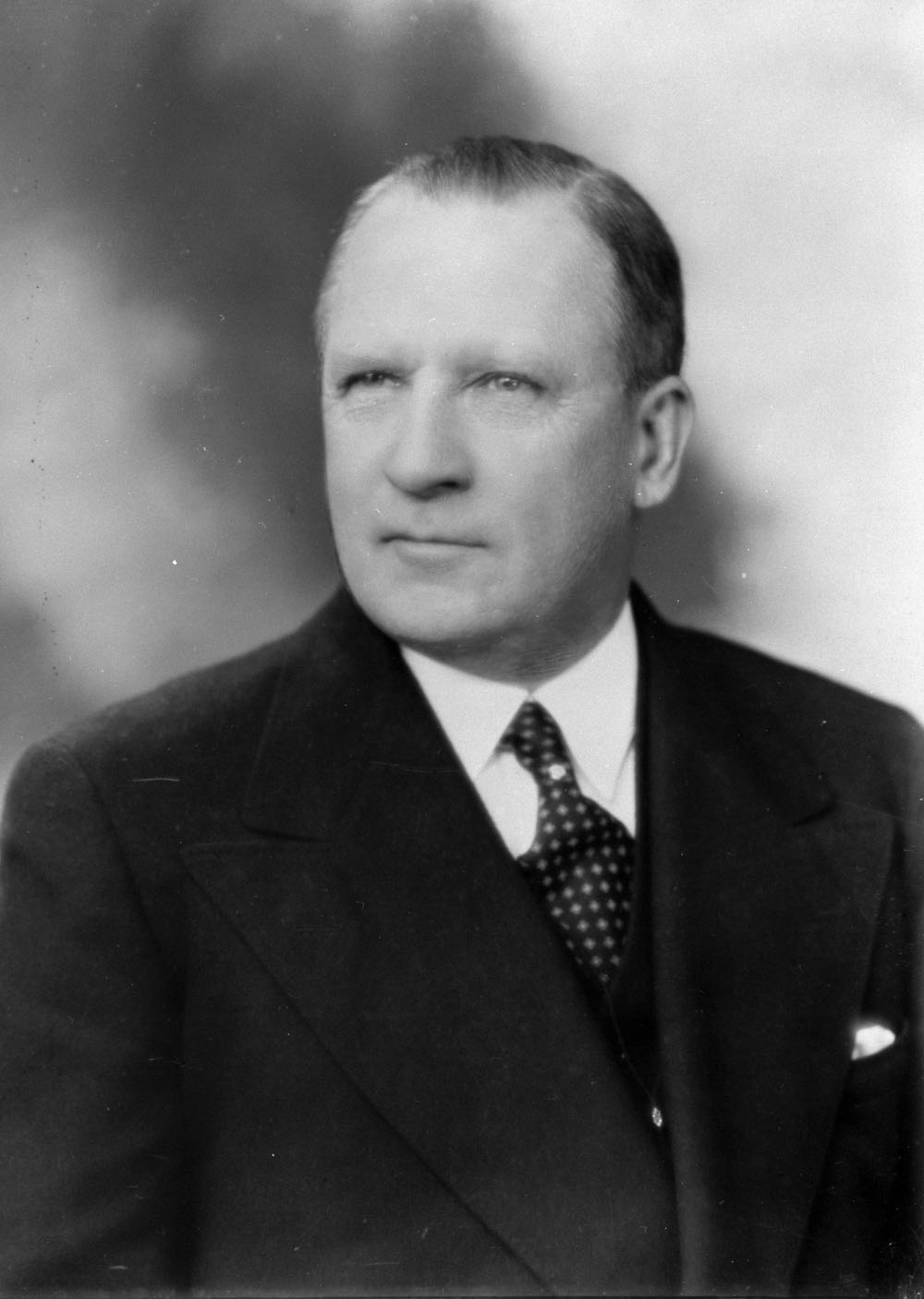
- Simpson, c. 1937

Ontario MPP
- In office 1929–1940
- Preceded by: Charles Ernest Wright
- Succeeded by: Duncan McArthur
- Constituency: Simcoe Centre

Personal details
- Born: July 30, 1882 Thornton, Ontario
- Died: August 18, 1940 (aged 58) Picton, Ontario
- Party: Liberal
- Spouse: Eleanor M. Dutcher
- Occupation: Physician

Leonard Jennett Simpson (July 30, 1882 – August 18, 1940) was a physician and politician in Ontario. He represented Simcoe Centre in the Legislative Assembly of Ontario from 1929 to 1940 as a Liberal member. He served as Minister of Education in the government of Premier Mitchell Hepburn from 1934 until his death in 1940.

== Background ==
The son of James Simpson and Rachael Jennett, he was born in Thornton, Ontario. Simpson was educated at the University of Toronto. In 1911, he married Eleanor M. Dutcher.

== Politics ==
Simpson ran unsuccessfully for a seat in the Ontario assembly in 1923.

He served as Minister of Education from 1934 to 1940. In 1935, he was named honorary president of the Royal Astronomical Society of Canada. Simpson died in office in Picton, Ontario at the age of 58.

=== Cabinet positions ===
Hepburn ministry, Province of Ontario (1934–1942)
Cabinet post (1)
Predecessor	Office	Successor
George Henry	Minister of Education; 1934-1940	Duncan McArthur
