= David Arthur Evans =

Canadian politician

Art Evans

Ontario MPP
- In office 1960–1977
- Preceded by: George Graham Johnston
- Succeeded by: George Taylor
- Constituency: Simcoe Centre

Personal details
- Born: February 10, 1915
- Died: December 14, 1989 (aged 74) Bradford, Ontario
- Party: Progressive Conservative
- Spouse: Eileen Alfreda Dixon
- Children: 4
- Occupation: Salesman

David Arthur Evans (February 10, 1915 - December 14, 1989) was a Canadian politician, who represented the electoral district of Simcoe Centre in the Legislative Assembly of Ontario from 1960 to 1977 as a Conservative member.

== Background ==
Evans was a salesman who owned a restaurant, a bakery, a clothing store and an apartment building. He was married to Audrey Myrtle Kerr (Died April 29, 1981), they had 4 children. Later to Eileen Alfreda Dixon, daughter of Roy Alfred Dixon and Beatrice Louisa Crumbie.

== Politics ==
Evans was Mayor of Bradford, Ontario and Warden of Simcoe County. In 1960 he was elected to the Legislative Assembly of Ontario in a by-election. He was re-elected in the elections in 1963, 1967, 1971 and 1975. He served as Parliamentary Assistant to the Minister of Energy (1974) and to the Minister of Transportation and Communications. He retired from politics in 1977.
