= Simcoe Centre (provincial electoral district) =

Former provincial electoral district in Ontario, Canada

Ontario electoral district

Defunct provincial electoral district
- Legislature: Legislative Assembly of Ontario
- District created: 1886
- District abolished: 1999
- First contested: 1886
- Last contested: 1995

Simcoe Centre was a provincial electoral district in Ontario, Canada. It was created in 1886 from parts of Simcoe South and Simcoe North It was abolished in 1996 before the 1999 election and merged into the riding of Barrie—Simcoe—Bradford.

== Members of Provincial Parliament ==
Simcoe Centre
Assembly	Years	Member	Party
6th	1886–1890	Orson James Phelps	Liberal
7th	1890–1894	Robert Paton	Liberal
8th	1894–1898	Robert Paton	Liberal
9th	1898–1902	Alfred Burke Thompson	Conservative
10th	1902–1904	David Davidson	Liberal
11th	1905–1908	Alfred Burke Thompson	Conservative
12th	1908–1911	Alfred Burke Thompson	Conservative
13th	1911–1914	Alfred Burke Thompson	Conservative
14th	1914–1919	Alfred Burke Thompson	Conservative
15th	1919–1923	Gilbert Hugh Murdoch	United Farmers
16th	1923–1926	Charles Ernest Wright	Conservative
17th	1926–1929	Charles Ernest Wright	Conservative
18th	1929–1934	Leonard Jennett Simpson	Liberal
19th	1934–1937	Leonard Jennett Simpson	Liberal
20th	1937–1940	Leonard Jennett Simpson	Liberal
20th	1940–1943	Duncan McArthur	Liberal
21st	1943–1945	George Graham Johnston	Progressive Conservative
22nd	1945–1948	George Graham Johnston	Progressive Conservative
23rd	1948–1951	George Graham Johnston	Progressive Conservative
24th	1951–1955	George Graham Johnston	Progressive Conservative
25th	1955–1959	George Graham Johnston	Progressive Conservative
26th	1959–1960	George Graham Johnston	Progressive Conservative
26th	1960–1963	David Arthur Evans	Progressive Conservative
27th	1963–1967	David Arthur Evans	Progressive Conservative
28th	1967–1971	David Arthur Evans	Progressive Conservative
29th	1971–1975	David Arthur Evans	Progressive Conservative
30th	1975–1977	David Arthur Evans	Progressive Conservative
31st	1977–1981	George William Taylor	Progressive Conservative
32nd	1981–1985	George William Taylor	Progressive Conservative
33rd	1985–1987	Earl W. Rowe	Progressive Conservative
34th	1987–1990	Bruce Owen	Liberal
35th	1990–1995	Paul Wessenger	New Democratic
36th	1995–1999	Joe Tascona	Progressive Conservative
Sourced from the Ontario Legislative Assembly
Merged into Barrie—Simcoe—Bradford before the 1999 election

== Election results ==
1995 Ontario general election
Party	Candidate	Votes	%	±%
Progressive Conservative	Joe Tascona	29,790	58.25	+34.17
Liberal	Bruce Owen	12,061	23.58	–7.37
New Democratic	Paul Wessenger	7,655	14.97	–22.82
Family Coalition	T. Susane Macphee-Manning	769	1.50	–
Green	Richard Warman	580	1.13	–
Independent	Les Barnett	284	0.56	–
Total valid votes		51,139	99.20	
Total rejected, unmarked and declined ballots		414	0.80	–0.61
Turnout		51,553	63.06	+0.60
Eligible voters		81,753		
Progressive Conservative gain from New Democratic		Swing		+28.50
Source: Elections Ontario

1990 Ontario general election
Party	Candidate	Votes	%	±%
New Democratic	Paul Wessenger	15,711	37.79	+17.45
Liberal	Bruce Owen	12,869	30.96	–12.36
Progressive Conservative	Ben Andrews	10,013	24.09	–12.26
Confederation of Regions	Bonnie Ainsworth	2,979	7.17	–
Total valid votes		41,572	98.59	
Total rejected, unmarked and declined ballots		596	1.41	+0.84
Turnout		42,168	62.46	+0.07
Eligible voters		67,514		
New Democratic gain from Liberal		Swing		+14.86
Source: Elections Ontario

1987 Ontario general election
Party	Candidate	Votes	%	±%
Liberal	Bruce Owen	15,474	43.32	+6.60
Progressive Conservative	Earl W. Rowe	12,982	36.34	–1.70
New Democratic	Fred Ruemper	7,265	20.34	–3.50
Total valid votes		35,721	99.42	
Total rejected ballots		207	0.58	+0.08
Turnout		35,928	62.39	+1.70
Eligible voters		57,588		
Liberal gain from Progressive Conservative		Swing		+4.15
Source: Elections Ontario

1985 Ontario general election
Party	Candidate	Votes	%	±%
Progressive Conservative	Earl W. Rowe	15,379	38.04	–11.80
Liberal	Ross Whiteside	14,845	36.72	–0.10
New Democratic	Paul Wessenger	9,639	23.84	+10.50
Independent	Steven Kaasgaard	566	1.40	–
Total valid votes		40,429	99.50	
Total rejected ballots		203	0.50	+0.14
Turnout		40,632	60.69	+1.70
Eligible voters		66,952		
Progressive Conservative hold		Swing		–5.85
Source: Elections Ontario

1981 Ontario general election
Party	Candidate	Votes	%	±%
Progressive Conservative	George William Taylor	16,926	49.84	+5.58
Liberal	Bruce Owen	12,505	36.82	+10.18
New Democratic	Gaye Lamb	4,532	13.34	–15.76
Total valid votes		33,963	99.64	
Total rejected ballots		123	0.36	+0.10
Turnout		34,086	58.99	–9.33
Eligible voters		57,781		
Progressive Conservative hold		Swing		–2.30
Source: Elections Ontario

1977 Ontario general election
Party	Candidate	Votes	%	±%
Progressive Conservative	George William Taylor	15,876	44.25	+4.73
New Democratic	Paul Wessenger	10,442	29.11	–4.79
Liberal	Jim Corneau	9,556	26.64	+0.06
Total valid votes		35,874	99.74	
Total rejected ballots		95	0.26	+0.04
Turnout		35,969	68.33	–1.09
Eligible voters		52,644		
Progressive Conservative hold		Swing		+4.76
Source: Elections Ontario

1975 Ontario general election
Party	Candidate	Votes	%	±%
Progressive Conservative	David Arthur Evans	13,557	39.52	–16.46
New Democratic	Paul Wessenger	11,628	33.90	+15.72
Liberal	Margaret Kelly	9,116	26.58	+0.74
Total valid votes		34,301	99.78	
Total rejected ballots		76	0.22	–0.06
Turnout		34,377	69.42	–2.88
Eligible voters		49,521		
Progressive Conservative hold		Swing		–16.09
Source: Elections Ontario

1971 Ontario general election
Party	Candidate	Votes	%	±%
Progressive Conservative	David Arthur Evans	17,067	55.98	+3.95
Liberal	Lloyd T. Bristow	7,875	25.83	–14.03
New Democratic	Bruce Bonnell	5,543	18.18	+10.07
Total valid votes		30,485	99.72	
Total rejected ballots		86	0.28	–0.38
Turnout		30,571	72.30	+6.08
Eligible voters		42,282		
Progressive Conservative hold		Swing		+8.99
Source: Elections Ontario

1967 Ontario general election
Party	Candidate	Votes	%	±%
Progressive Conservative	David Arthur Evans	10,814	52.03	–10.67
Liberal	Bruce Owen	8,284	39.86	+9.91
New Democratic	Bob Dennis	1,686	8.11	+0.75
Total valid votes		20,784	99.34	
Total rejected ballots		139	0.66	–0.18
Turnout		20,923	66.22	+6.61
Eligible voters		31,595		
Progressive Conservative hold		Swing		–10.29
Source: Elections Ontario

1963 Ontario general election
Party	Candidate	Votes	%	±%
Progressive Conservative	David Arthur Evans	10,825	62.70	+15.24
Liberal	Frank Todd	5,170	29.94	–14.41
New Democratic	Derrick Manson	1,271	7.36	–0.83
Total valid votes		17,266	99.16	
Total rejected ballots		147	0.84	–0.46
Turnout		17,413	59.62	–11.96
Eligible voters		29,208		
Progressive Conservative hold		Swing		+14.83
Source: Elections Ontario

Ontario provincial by-election, September 29, 1960 Death of George Graham Johnston
Party	Candidate	Votes	%	±%
Progressive Conservative	David Arthur Evans	9,196	47.46	–5.47
Liberal	Edgar Coughlin	8,595	44.35	+5.18
Co-operative Commonwealth	William Gearing	1,587	8.19	+0.29
Total valid votes		19,378	98.69	
Total rejected ballots		257	1.31	–0.32
Turnout		19,635	71.57	+8.95
Eligible voters		27,433		
Progressive Conservative hold		Swing		–5.32
Source: Elections Ontario

1959 Ontario general election
Party	Candidate	Votes	%	±%
Progressive Conservative	George Graham Johnston	8,625	52.92	–4.47
Liberal	E. G. Coughlin	6,385	39.18	–3.43
Co-operative Commonwealth	Derrick Manson	1,287	7.90	–
Total valid votes		16,297	98.37	
Total rejected ballots		270	1.63	+0.26
Turnout		16,567	62.63	+0.18
Eligible voters		26,454		
Progressive Conservative hold		Swing		–0.52
Source: Elections Ontario

1955 Ontario general election
Party	Candidate	Votes	%	±%
Progressive Conservative	George Graham Johnston	8,305	57.39	+0.36
Liberal	F. Charles Newton	6,166	42.61	–0.36
Total valid votes		14,471	98.63	
Total rejected ballots		201	1.37	+0.38
Turnout		14,672	62.45	+0.40
Eligible voters		23,495		
Progressive Conservative hold		Swing		+0.36
Source: Elections Ontario

1951 Ontario general election
Party	Candidate	Votes	%	±%
Progressive Conservative	George Graham Johnston	7,721	57.03	+15.30
Liberal	F. Charles Newton	5,818	42.97	+14.08
Total valid votes		13,539	99.01	
Total rejected ballots		135	0.99	+0.22
Turnout		13,674	62.05	–5.18
Eligible voters		22,038		
Progressive Conservative hold		Swing		+0.61
Source: Elections Ontario

1948 Ontario general election
Party	Candidate	Votes	%	±%
Progressive Conservative	George Graham Johnston	5,791	41.73	–3.49
Liberal	Charles Henry	4,009	28.89	–4.62
Co-operative Commonwealth	John Lougheed	1,805	13.01	+0.27
Independent	Mahlon F. Beach	1,766	12.73	+4.19
Union of Electors	Jerome Charlebois	506	3.65	–
Total valid votes		13,877	99.23	
Total rejected ballots		108	0.77	–0.24
Turnout		13,985	67.22	+1.38
Eligible voters		20,804		
Progressive Conservative hold		Swing		+0.57
Source: Elections Ontario

1945 Ontario general election
Party	Candidate	Votes	%	±%
Progressive Conservative	George Graham Johnston	6,229	45.22	+3.23
Liberal	Wilfred O. McKinnon	4,616	33.51	–2.61
Co-operative Commonwealth	Harold V. Bingham	1,754	12.73	–9.16
Independent	Mahlon F. Beach	1,176	8.54	–
Total valid votes		13,775	98.99	
Total rejected ballots		141	1.01	–1.22
Turnout		13,916	65.85	+10.34
Eligible voters		21,134		
Progressive Conservative hold		Swing		+2.92
Source: Elections Ontario

1943 Ontario general election
Party	Candidate	Votes	%	±%
Progressive Conservative	George Graham Johnston	4,176	41.99	–
Liberal	Orville E. Todd	3,592	36.12	–
Co-operative Commonwealth	Elsie G. Raikes	2,177	21.89	–
Total valid votes		9,945	97.77	
Total rejected ballots		227	2.23	–
Turnout		10,172	55.51	–
Eligible voters		18,326		
Progressive Conservative gain from Liberal		Swing		–
Source: Elections Ontario

Ontario provincial by-election, October 23, 1940 Death of Leonard Jennett Simpson
Party	Candidate	Votes
Liberal	Duncan McArthur	acclaimed
Source: Elections Ontario

1937 Ontario general election
Party	Candidate	Votes	%	±%
Liberal	Leonard Jennett Simpson	8,375	54.19	–8.40
Conservative	William Earl Rowe	7,081	45.81	+8.40
Total valid votes		15,456	98.39	
Total rejected ballots		253	1.61	+0.42
Turnout		15,709	77.08	+2.62
Eligible voters		20,380		
Liberal hold		Swing		–8.40
Source: Elections Ontario

1934 Ontario general election
Party	Candidate	Votes	%	±%
Liberal	Leonard Jennett Simpson	9,004	62.59	+11.51
Conservative	James Franklin Craig	5,382	37.41	–11.51
Total valid votes		14,386	98.81	
Total rejected ballots		173	1.19	+0.59
Turnout		14,559	74.46	–2.60
Eligible voters		19,552		
Liberal hold		Swing		+11.51
Source: Elections Ontario

1929 Ontario general election
Party	Candidate	Votes	%	±%
Liberal	Leonard Jennett Simpson	5,199	51.08	+2.02
Conservative	John Forgie	4,979	48.92	–2.02
Total valid votes		10,178	99.40	
Total rejected ballots		61	0.60	+0.06
Turnout		10,239	77.06	+6.59
Eligible voters		13,287		
Liberal gain from Conservative		Swing		+2.02
Source: Elections Ontario

1926 Ontario general election
Party	Candidate	Votes	%	±%
Conservative	Charles Ernest Wright	5,315	50.93	+11.09
Liberal	Ebenezer Todd	5,120	49.07	+22.78
Total valid votes		10,435	99.47	
Total rejected ballots		56	0.53	–0.24
Turnout		10,491	70.47	+4.70
Eligible voters		14,887		
Conservative hold		Swing		–5.84
Source: Elections Ontario

1923 Ontario general election
Party	Candidate	Votes	%	±%
Conservative	Charles Ernest Wright	3,535	39.84	–2.27
United Farmers	Gilbert Hugh Murdoch	3,006	33.88	–24.01
Liberal	Leonard Jennett Simpson	2,332	26.28	–
Total valid votes		8,873	99.23	
Total rejected ballots		69	0.77	–2.74
Turnout		8,942	65.77	–8.78
Eligible voters		13,596		
Conservative gain from United Farmers		Swing		+10.87
Source: Elections Ontario

1919 Ontario general election
Party	Candidate	Votes	%	±%
United Farmers	Gilbert Hugh Murdoch	5,234	57.89	–
Conservative	John Thomas Simpson	3,808	42.11	–11.16
Total valid votes		9,042	96.49	
Total rejected ballots		329	3.51	+2.87
Turnout		9,371	74.54	–8.16
Eligible voters		12,571		
United Farmers gain from Conservative		Swing		–
Source: Elections Ontario

1914 Ontario general election
Party	Candidate	Votes	%	±%
Conservative	Alfred Burke Thompson	2,247	53.27	+1.91
Liberal	Hampton E. Jory	1,971	46.73	–1.91
Total valid votes		4,218	99.36	
Total rejected ballots		27	0.64	+0.26
Turnout		4,245	82.70	+16.53
Eligible voters		5,133		
Conservative hold		Swing		+1.91
Source: Elections Ontario

1911 Ontario general election
Party	Candidate	Votes	%	±%
Conservative	Alfred Burke Thompson	1,791	51.36	–3.72
Liberal	Hampton E. Jory	1,696	48.64	+3.72
Total valid votes		3,487	99.63	
Total rejected ballots		13	0.37	–0.02
Turnout		3,500	66.18	–9.79
Eligible voters		5,289		
Conservative hold		Swing		–3.72
Source: Elections Ontario

1908 Ontario general election
Party	Candidate	Votes	%	±%
Conservative	Alfred Burke Thompson	1,972	55.08	–2.17
Liberal	Richard Graham	1,608	44.92	+2.17
Total valid votes		3,580	99.61	
Total rejected ballots		14	0.39	+0.16
Turnout		3,594	75.97	–3.13
Eligible voters		4,731		
Conservative hold		Swing		–2.17
Source: Elections Ontario

1905 Ontario general election
Party	Candidate	Votes	%	±%
Conservative	Alfred Burke Thompson	2,201	57.26	+7.86
Liberal	C. E. Hewson	1,643	42.74	–7.86
Total valid votes		3,844	99.77	
Total rejected ballots		9	0.23	+0.21
Turnout		3,853	79.10	+3.61
Eligible voters		4,871		
Conservative gain from Liberal		Swing		+7.86
Source: Elections Ontario

1902 Ontario general election
Party	Candidate	Votes	%	±%
Liberal	David Davidson	1,857	50.60	+8.36
Conservative	Alfred Burke Thompson	1,813	49.40	+5.75
Total valid votes		3,670	99.97	
Total rejected ballots		1	0.03	–0.61
Turnout		3,671	75.49	–1.83
Eligible voters		4,863		
Liberal gain from Conservative		Swing		+1.31
Source: Elections Ontario

1898 Ontario general election
Party	Candidate	Votes	%	±%
Conservative	Alfred Burke Thompson	1,761	43.65	+14.69
Liberal	David Davidson	1,704	42.24	+5.48
Independent	A. Bain	569	14.11	–
Total valid votes		4,034	99.36	
Total rejected ballots		26	0.64	+0.64
Turnout		4,060	77.32	+9.44
Eligible voters		5,251		
Conservative gain from Liberal		Swing		+7.34
Source: Elections Ontario

1894 Ontario general election
Party	Candidate	Votes	%	±%
Liberal	Robert Paton	1,170	36.76	–20.96
Protestant Protective	Mr. Coutts	1,091	34.28	–
Conservative	Alfred Burke Thompson	922	28.97	–
Total valid votes		3,183	100.00	
Total rejected ballots		–		
Turnout		3,183	67.88	+7.85
Eligible voters		4,689		
Liberal hold		Swing		–10.48
Source: Elections Ontario

1890 Ontario general election
Party	Candidate	Votes	%	±%
Liberal	Robert Paton	1,559	57.72	+3.62
Conservative Equal Rights	A. Craig	1,142	42.28	–
Total valid votes		2,701	99.63	
Total rejected ballots		10	0.37	–0.57
Turnout		2,711	60.03	–2.44
Eligible voters		4,516		
Liberal hold		Swing		+1.81
Source: Elections Ontario

1886 Ontario general election
Party	Candidate	Votes	%
Liberal	Orson James Phelps	1,366	54.10
Conservative	W. Harvey	1,159	45.90
Total valid votes		2,525	99.06
Total rejected ballots		24	0.94
Turnout		2,549	62.48
Eligible voters		4,080	
Liberal pickup new district.			
Source: Elections Ontario

== See also ==
- List of Ontario provincial electoral districts
- Canadian provincial electoral districts
