= Gilbert Hugh Murdoch =

Canadian politician from Ontario

Member of the Ontario Provincial Parliament for Simcoe Centre
- In office October 20, 1919 – May 10, 1923
- Preceded by: Alfred Burke Thompson
- Succeeded by: Charles Ernest Wright

Personal details
- Party: United Farmers

Gilbert Hugh Murdoch was a Canadian politician from Ontario. He represented Simcoe Centre in the Legislative Assembly of Ontario from 1919 to 1923.

== See also ==
- 15th Parliament of Ontario
