= Earl W. Rowe =

Canadian politician

Earl Rowe
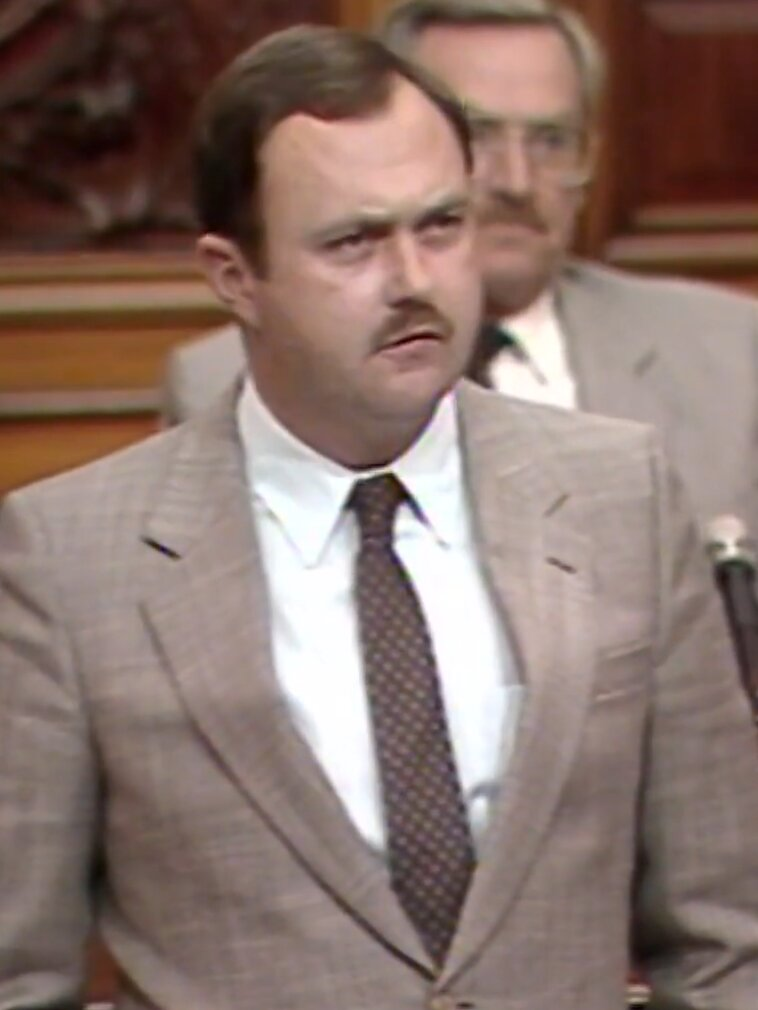
- Rowe in 1986

Ontario MPP
- In office 1985–1987
- Preceded by: George Taylor
- Succeeded by: Bruce Owen
- Constituency: Simcoe Centre

Personal details
- Born: 1951 (age 74–75)
- Party: Progressive Conservative
- Relations: William Earl Rowe, grandfather
- Profession: Manager

Earl W. Rowe (born c. 1951) is a former politician in Ontario, Canada. He served in the Legislative Assembly of Ontario from 1985 to 1987, as a member of the Progressive Conservative Party of Ontario.

== Background ==
Prior to his entry into politics, Rowe was the manager of the Barrie Raceway. He is the grandson of former Lieutenant Governor of Ontario William Earl Rowe.

== Politics ==
Rowe was elected to the Ontario legislature in the 1985 provincial election, defeating Liberal Party candidate Ross Whiteside by 534 votes in Simcoe Centre. The Progressive Conservatives won a tenuous minority government in this election, and were soon defeated in the legislature by a motion of non-confidence. After this, Rowe served as an opposition member for two years.

He was defeated in the 1987 provincial election, losing to Liberal Bruce Owen by 2,492 votes.
