= Simcoe West =

Former provincial electoral district in Ontario, Canada

Ontario electoral district

Defunct provincial electoral district
- Legislature: Legislative Assembly of Ontario
- District created: 1875
- District abolished: 1999 (Note: Riding existed from 1875–1926 and again from 1987–1999.)
- First contested: 1875
- Last contested: 1995

Simcoe West was a provincial electoral district in Ontario, Canada. It was created in 1875 from Simcoe North. It was abolished in 1925 before the 1926 election. It was re-established in 1987 and finally abolished in 1999.

== Members of Provincial Parliament ==
Simcoe West
Assembly	Years	Member	Party
3rd	1875–1879	Thomas Long	Conservative
4th	1879–1883	Thomas Long	Conservative
5th	1883–1886	Orson James Phelps	Liberal
6th	1886–1890	Thomas Wylie	Conservative
7th	1890–1894	Thomas Wylie	Conservative
8th	1894–1898	Archibald Currie	Patron-Liberal
9th	1898–1902	James Stoddart Duff	Conservative
10th	1902–1904	James Stoddart Duff	Conservative
11th	1905–1908	James Stoddart Duff	Conservative
12th	1908–1911	James Stoddart Duff	Conservative
13th	1911–1914	James Stoddart Duff	Conservative
14th	1914–1916	James Stoddart Duff	Conservative
14th	1916–1919	William Torrance Allen	Conservative
15th	1919–1923	William Torrance Allen	Conservative
16th	1923–1926	James Edgar Jamieson	Conservative
Abolished in 1925; re-established in 1987
34th	1987–1990	George McCague	Progressive Conservative
35th	1990–1995	Jim Wilson	Progressive Conservative
36th	1995–1999	Jim Wilson	Progressive Conservative
Sourced from the Ontario Legislative Assembly
Merged into Simcoe—Grey before the 1999 election

== Election results ==
=== 1987–1999 ===
1995 Ontario general election
Party	Candidate	Votes	%	±%
Progressive Conservative	Jim Wilson	24,346	68.24	+31.75
Liberal	Jamie Shortt	5,499	15.41	–8.78
New Democratic	Kathy Simpson	4,937	13.84	–16.92
Family Coalition	James Gault	894	2.51	–6.05
Total valid votes		35,676	99.36	
Total rejected, unmarked and declined ballots		229	0.64	–0.74
Turnout		35,905	63.01	–0.83
Eligible voters		56,980		
Progressive Conservative hold		Swing		+20.27
Source: Elections Ontario

1990 Ontario general election
Party	Candidate	Votes	%	±%
Progressive Conservative	Jim Wilson	11,710	36.49	–5.46
New Democratic	Leo Losereit	9,870	30.76	+13.56
Liberal	Gary Johnson	7,765	24.20	–16.65
Family Coalition	James W. McGillivray	2,744	8.55	–
Total valid votes		32,089	98.62	
Total rejected, unmarked and declined ballots		449	1.38	+0.84
Turnout		32,538	63.84	+2.84
Eligible voters		50,968		
Progressive Conservative hold		Swing		–9.51
Source: Elections Ontario

1987 Ontario general election
Party	Candidate	Votes	%
Progressive Conservative	George McCague	11,678	41.95
Liberal	Gary Johnson	11,372	40.85
New Democratic	Noel St-Laurent	4,788	17.20
Total valid votes		27,838	99.46
Total rejected ballots		151	0.54
Turnout		27,989	61.00
Eligible voters		45,886	
Progressive Conservative pickup new district.			
Source: Elections Ontario

=== 1867–1926 ===
1923 Ontario general election
Party	Candidate	Votes	%	±%
Conservative	James Edgar Jamieson	3,610	56.78	+1.31
United Farmers	Richard Baker	2,030	31.93	–12.61
Liberal	Hugh A. Currie	634	9.97	–
Independent	William Carmichael	84	1.32	–
Total valid votes		6,358	98.63	
Total rejected ballots		88	1.37	–1.43
Turnout		6,446	57.05	–14.93
Eligible voters		11,299		
Conservative hold		Swing		+6.96
Source: Elections Ontario

1919 Ontario general election
Party	Candidate	Votes	%	±%
Conservative	William Torrance Allen	4,491	55.46	–2.41
United Farmers	Richard Baker	3,606	44.54	–
Total valid votes		8,097	97.20	
Total rejected ballots		233	2.80	+2.25
Turnout		8,330	71.98	–0.93
Eligible voters		11,573		
Conservative hold		Swing		–1.20
Source: Elections Ontario

Ontario provincial by-election, January 15, 1917 Death of James Stoddart Duff
Party	Candidate	Votes	%	±%
Conservative	William Torrance Allen	2,334	57.87	–8.17
Liberal	Isaac Scott	1,699	42.13	–
Total valid votes		4,033	99.46	
Total rejected ballots		22	0.54	+0.19
Turnout		4,055	72.91	–0.87
Eligible voters		5,562		
Conservative hold		Swing		–4.09
Source: Elections Ontario

1914 Ontario general election
Party	Candidate	Votes	%	±%
Conservative	James Stoddart Duff	2,233	66.05	–
Temperance	John Coburn	1,148	33.95	–
Total valid votes		3,381	99.65	
Total rejected ballots		12	0.35	–
Turnout		3,393	73.78	–
Eligible voters		4,599		
Conservative hold		Swing		–
Source: Elections Ontario

1911 Ontario general election
Party	Candidate	Votes
Conservative	James Stoddart Duff	acclaimed
Source: Elections Ontario

Ontario provincial by-election, October 23, 1908 Ministerial by-election, upon appointment as Minister of Agriculture
Party	Candidate	Votes
Conservative	James Stoddart Duff	acclaimed
Source: Elections Ontario

1908 Ontario general election
Party	Candidate	Votes	%	±%
Conservative	James Stoddart Duff	1,921	65.38	+5.78
Liberal-Temperance	Joseph Alberta Akitt	1,017	34.62	–
Total valid votes		2,938	99.39	
Total rejected ballots		18	0.61	–0.00
Turnout		2,956	61.18	–4.16
Eligible voters		4,832		
Conservative hold		Swing		+2.89
Source: Elections Ontario

1905 Ontario general election
Party	Candidate	Votes	%	±%
Conservative	James Stoddart Duff	2,129	59.60	–10.29
Liberal	J. Bernie	1,443	40.40	–
Total valid votes		3,572	99.39	
Total rejected ballots		22	0.61	+0.49
Turnout		3,594	65.33	+19.18
Eligible voters		5,501		
Conservative hold		Swing		–5.14
Source: Elections Ontario

1902 Ontario general election
Party	Candidate	Votes	%	±%
Conservative	James Stoddart Duff	1,734	69.89	+13.84
Prohibitionist	A. B. Spencer	747	30.11	–
Total valid votes		2,481	99.88	
Total rejected ballots		3	0.12	–0.16
Turnout		2,484	46.15	–19.68
Eligible voters		5,382		
Conservative hold		Swing		+6.92
Source: Elections Ontario

1898 Ontario general election
Party	Candidate	Votes	%	±%
Conservative	James Stoddart Duff	2,015	56.05	+7.53
Liberal	Archibald Currie	1,580	43.95	–7.53
Total valid votes		3,595	99.72	
Total rejected ballots		10	0.28	+0.11
Turnout		3,605	65.83	+7.45
Eligible voters		5,476		
Conservative gain from Liberal-Patrons of Industry		Swing		+7.53
Source: Elections Ontario

1894 Ontario general election
Party	Candidate	Votes	%	±%
Liberal-Patrons of Industry	Archibald Currie	1,509	51.48	–
Conservative-Patron	James Stoddart Duff	1,422	48.52	–
Total valid votes		2,931	99.83	
Total rejected ballots		5	0.17	–0.43
Turnout		2,936	58.38	+13.43
Eligible voters		5,029		
Liberal-Patrons of Industry gain from Conservative		Swing		+0.00
Source: Elections Ontario

1890 Ontario general election
Party	Candidate	Votes	%	±%
Conservative	Thomas Wylie	1,318	61.56	+4.86
Liberal	Joseph G. Hood	823	38.44	–4.86
Total valid votes		2,141	99.40	
Total rejected ballots		13	0.60	+0.30
Turnout		2,154	44.95	–11.87
Eligible voters		4,792		
Conservative hold		Swing		+4.86
Source: Elections Ontario

1886 Ontario general election
Party	Candidate	Votes	%	±%
Conservative	Thomas Wylie	1,498	56.70	+7.25
Liberal	W. J. Frame	1,144	43.30	–7.25
Total valid votes		2,642	99.70	
Total rejected ballots		8	0.30	+0.30
Turnout		2,650	56.82	–
Eligible voters		4,664		
Conservative gain from Liberal		Swing		+7.25
Source: Elections Ontario

Ontario provincial by-election, December 14, 1883 Void election
Party	Candidate	Votes	%	±%
Liberal	Orson James Phelps	1,936	50.55	+0.03
Conservative	Thomas Wylie	1,894	49.45	–0.03
Total valid votes		3,830	100.00	
Total rejected ballots		–		
Turnout		3,830	–	–
Eligible voters				
Liberal hold		Swing		+0.03
Source: Elections Ontario

1883 Ontario general election
Party	Candidate	Votes	%	±%
Liberal	Orson James Phelps	1,699	50.52	+1.62
Conservative	G. Moberley	1,664	49.48	–1.62
Total valid votes		3,363	100.00	
Total rejected ballots		–		
Turnout		3,363	64.51	+9.46
Eligible voters		5,213		
Liberal gain from Conservative		Swing		+1.62
Source: Elections Ontario

1879 Ontario general election
Party	Candidate	Votes	%	±%
Conservative	Thomas Long	1,483	51.10	−0.05
Liberal	Orson James Phelps	1,419	48.90	+0.05
Total valid votes		2,902	55.06	−12.57
Eligible voters		5,271		
Conservative hold		Swing		−0.05
Source: Elections Ontario

1875 Ontario general election
Party	Candidate	Votes	%
Conservative	Thomas Long	1,353	51.15
Liberal	Thomas David McConkey	1,292	48.85
Total valid votes		2,645	67.63
Eligible voters		3,911	
Conservative pickup new district.			
Source: Elections Ontario

== See also ==
- List of Ontario provincial electoral districts
- Canadian provincial electoral districts
