= Grey Regiment =

The Grey Regiment
- Active: 1866-1936
- Country: Canada
- Branch: Canadian Militia
- Type: Line infantry
- Role: Infantry
- Size: One battalion
- Part of: Non-Permanent Active Militia
- Garrison/HQ: Owen Sound, Ontario
- Engagements: Second Boer War; First World War
- Battle honours: Hill 70; Ypres, 1917; Amiens; Arras, 1918; Hindenburg Line; Pursuit to Mons

The Grey Regiment was an infantry regiment of the Non-Permanent Active Militia of the Canadian Militia (now the Canadian Army). In 1936, the regiment was amalgamated with the Simcoe Foresters to form the Grey and Simcoe Foresters.

== Lineage ==
=== The Grey Regiment ===
- Originated on 14 September 1866, in Owen Sound, Canada West, as the 31st Grey Battalion of Infantry
- Redesignated on 8 May 1900, as the 31st Grey Regiment
- Redesignated on 1 May 1920, as The Grey Regiment
- Amalgamated on 15 December 1936, with The Simcoe Foresters and redesignated as The Grey and Simcoe Foresters

== Perpetuations ==
- 147th (Grey) Battalion, CEF
- 248th Battalion, CEF

== History ==
=== Early history ===
With the passing of the Militia Act of 1855, the first of a number of newly-raised independent militia companies were established in and around the Grey County region of Canada West (now the Province of Ontario).

On 14 September 1866, the 31st Grey Battalion of Infantry was authorized for service by the regimentation of five of these previously authorized independent militia rifle and infantry companies. Its regimental headquarters was at Owen Sound and companies at Owen Sound, Meaford, Leith, Durham and Flesherton, Ontario.

=== South African War and early 1900s ===
During the South African War, the 31st Grey Battalion contributed volunteers for the Canadian Contingents serving overseas.

On 8 May 1900, the 31st Grey Battalion of Infantry was redesignated as the 31st Grey Regiment.

=== Great War ===
During the First World War, the 31st Grey Regiment as a unit was not mobilized but when the Canadian Expeditionary Force was raised in September 1914, drafts from various units were called up and formed into numbered battalions. The 31st Grey Regiment in particular contributed drafts to help form the 15th Battalion (48th Highlanders of Canada), CEF as part of the First Canadian Contingent (later the 1st Canadian Division).

On 22 December 1915, the 147th (Grey) Battalion, CEF was authorized for service and on 14 November 1916, the battalion embarked for Great Britain. On 1 January 1917, the battalion’s personnel were absorbed by the 8th Reserve Battalion, CEF to provide reinforcements to the Canadian Corps in the field. On 1 September 1917, the 147th Battalion, CEF was disbanded.

On 1 May 1917, the 248th Battalion, CEF was authorized for service and on 2 June 1917, the battalion embarked for Great Britain. On 21 June 1917, the battalion’s personnel were absorbed by the 8th Reserve Battalion, CEF to provide reinforcements to the Canadian Corps in the field. On 15 September 1917, the 248th Battalion, CEF was disbanded.

=== 1920s–1930s ===
On 1 May 1920, as a result of the Otter Commission and the following post-war reorganization of the militia, the 31st Grey Regiment was Redesignated as The Grey Regiment and was reorganized with two battalions (one of them a paper-only reserve battalion) to perpetuate the assigned war-raised battalions of the Canadian Expeditionary Force.

As a result of the 1936 Canadian Militia reorganization, on 15 December 1936, The Grey Regiment was amalgamated with The Simcoe Foresters to form The Grey and Simcoe Foresters.

== Organization ==
=== 31st Grey Battalion of Infantry (14 September 1866) ===
- Regimental Headquarters (Owen Sound, Canada West)
- No. 1 Company (Owen Sound) (first raised on 24 October 1862 as the Owen Sound Volunteer Militia Company of Infantry)
- No. 2 Company (Meaford) (first raised on 17 October 1862 as the Meaford Volunteer Militia Rifle Company)
- No. 3 Company (Leith) (first raised on 30 January 1863 as the Leith Volunteer Militia Company of Infantry)
- No. 4 Company (Durham) (first raised on 6 February 1863 as the Durham Volunteer Militia Company of Infantry)
- No. 5 Company (Owen Sound) (first raised on 6 July 1866 as the Owen Sound Infantry Company)

=== The Grey Regiment (1 March 1921) ===
- 1st Battalion (perpetuating the 14th Battalion, CEF)
- 2nd (Reserve) Battalion (perpetuating the 248th Battalion, CEF)

== Battle honours ==
- Hill 70
- Ypres, 1917 (Note: Selected to be borne on colours and appointments)
- Amiens
- Arras, 1918
- Hindenburg Line
- Pursuit to Mons

== Notable members ==
- Major-General Sir Sam Steele KCMG CB MVO
- Private Thomas William Holmes VC
- Brigadier Thomas Rutherford CBE ED
