= Simcoe Foresters =

The Simcoe Foresters
- Active: 1866-1936
- Country: Province of Canada 1866–1867; Canada 1867–1936
- Branch: Canadian Militia
- Type: Line infantry
- Role: Infantry
- Size: One battalion
- Part of: Non-Permanent Active Militia
- Garrison/HQ: Barrie, Ontario
- Motto(s): Latin: Spectemur agendo, lit. 'Let us be judged by our acts'
- Engagements: North-West Rebellion; Second Boer War; First World War
- Battle honours: See #Battle honours

The Simcoe Foresters was an infantry regiment of the Non-Permanent Active Militia of the Canadian Militia (now the Canadian Army). In 1936, the regiment was amalgamated with The Grey Regiment to form The Grey and Simcoe Foresters.

== Lineage ==
=== The Simcoe Foresters ===
- Originated on 14 September 1866, in Barrie, Canada West, as the 35th Simcoe Battalion of Infantry
- Redesignated on 5 April 1867, as the 35th Battalion The Simcoe Foresters
- Redesignated on 8 May 1900, as the 35th Regiment Simcoe Foresters
- Redesignated on 1 May 1920, as The Simcoe Foresters
- Amalgamated on 15 December 1936, with The Grey Regiment and Redesignated as The Grey and Simcoe Foresters

== Perpetuations ==
- 157th Battalion (Simcoe Foresters), CEF
- 177th Battalion (Simcoe Foresters), CEF

== Organization ==
=== 35th Simcoe Battalion of Infantry (14 September 1866) ===
- No. 1 Company (Barrie) (first raised on 27 December 1855 as the Barrie Volunteer Militia Rifle Company)
- No. 2 Company (Collingwood) (first raised on 13 November 1856 as The First Volunteer Militia Rifle Company of Collingwood)
- No. 3 Company (Cookstown) (first raised on 19 December 1861 as The 1st Volunteer Militia Rifle Company of Cookstown)
- No. 4 Company (Bradford) (first raised on 9 January 1863 as the Bradford Volunteer Militia Company of Infantry)
- No. 5 Company (Barrie) (first raised on 9 January 1863 as the Volunteer Militia Company of Infantry of Barrie)
- No. 6 Company (Oro) (first raised on 8 June 1866 as the Oro Company of Infantry) Co. 6 moved to Huntsville, On. 1886-1907
- No. 7 Company (Orillia) (first raised on 8 June 1866 as the Orillia Company of Infantry)

=== The Simcoe Foresters (15 December 1920) ===
- 1st Battalion (perpetuating the 157th Battalion, CEF)
- 2nd (Reserve) Battalion (perpetuating the 177th Battalion, CEF)

== Battle honours ==
=== North West Rebellion ===
- North West Canada, 1885

=== Great War ===
- Arras, 1917, '18 (Note: "Arras, 1918" selected to be borne on colours and appointments)
- Hill 70
- Ypres, 1917 (Note: Selected to be borne on colours and appointments)
- Amiens
- Hindenburg Line
- Pursuit to Mons

== Notable members ==
- Major-General Sir Sam Steele KCMG CB MVO
- Lieutenant-Colonel William Edward O'Brien: Commanding officer of the York and Simcoe Provisional Battalion during the North-West Rebellion
- Major Sir Daniel Hunter McMillan KCMG
- Flight Lieutenant Alfred B. Thompson
- Captain Harry Jennings, Penetanguishene, served during the North-West Rebellion
