= Thomas William Holmes =

Thomas William Holmes VC
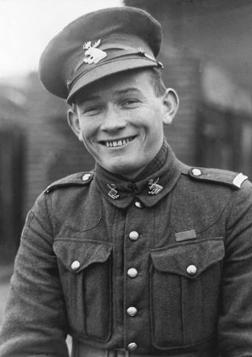
- Born: 14 October 1898; Montreal, Quebec, Canada
- Died: 4 January 1950 (aged 51); Toronto, Ontario
- Burial place: Greenwood Cemetery, Owen Sound, Ontario, Canada
- Military career
- Allegiance: Canada
- Branch: Canadian Expeditionary Force
- Service years: 1915–1919
- Rank: Sergeant
- Units: 147th (Grey) Battalion, CEF; 4th Battalion, Canadian Mounted Rifles
- Conflicts: First World War
- Awards: Victoria Cross
- Other work: Harbour pilot

Thomas William Holmes VC (14 October 1898 – 4 January 1950) was a soldier in the Canadian Expeditionary Force (CEF), and was a Canadian recipient of the Victoria Cross, the highest and most prestigious award for gallantry in the face of the enemy that can be awarded to British and other Commonwealth forces, during the First World War. Only 19 years old at the time, Holmes is the youngest Canadian ever to win the Victoria Cross.

== Early life ==
Although Holmes was born in Montreal, Quebec, his family was from Owen Sound, Ontario. His father's work had taken them to Montreal; however, they returned to Owen Sound when Tommy was about six years old. During his last year of school, he worked for the butcher J.R. Boyd, and just before enlisting Holmes was working on the farm of Templeton Day at nearby Annan, Ontario.

== World War I ==
On 20 December 1915, No. 838301 Tommy Holmes enlisted as a private soldier in the 147th (Grey) Battalion, CEF, at Owen Sound in Grey County. The 147th Battalion was raised by the Grey Regiment, which also later raised the 248th Battalion, CEF. As was common practice at the time, Tommy lied about his age – he was actually 17 years old when he joined up. He was sworn in by the 147th Grey Battalion's commanding officer, Lieutenant-Colonel G.H. McFarland.

Prior to embarking for England, the battalion trained at Camps Niagara and Borden (today CFB Borden) in Ontario, and at Amherst, Nova Scotia. The battalion was at Camp Borden from 4 July 1916 until 5 October 1916, when it departed for Halifax. Embarkation was delayed, leading to the 147th encamping at Amherst. Finally, on 20 November 1916, Tommy Holmes arrived with the 147th (Grey) Battalion at Liverpool, England. The 147th had sailed in RMS Titanic's sister ship RMS Olympic. Like the other 35 CEF battalions that trained at the newly opened Camp Borden in that hot summer of 1916, the 147th (Grey) Battalion was broken up for reinforcements to units already in the field. Consequently, Tommy Holmes was transferred to the 8th Reserve (Holding) Battalion on 1 February 1917, and then to the 4th Battalion, Canadian Mounted Rifles (4 CMR) on 16 February 1917.

In April 1917 during the Battle of Vimy Ridge, he received a through-and-through bullet wound in his arm from a machine gun and was temporarily invalided to England. While in hospital, he met up with his older brother Roy, who had enlisted earlier in the 58th Battalion, CEF, and who had also been wounded, losing an eye.

Holmes was 19 years old, when as a private serving with the 4 CMR, participated in the Battle of Passchendaele. On 26 October 1917 near Passchendaele, Belgium, he performed a deed for which King George V awarded Holmes the Victoria Cross:

when the right flank of the Canadian attack was held up by heavy machine-gun fire from a pill-box strong point and heavy casualties were producing a critical situation, Private Holmes, on his own initiative and single-handed, ran forward and threw two bombs, killing and wounding the crews of two machine-guns. He then fetched another bomb and threw this into the entrance of the pill-box, causing the 19 occupants to surrender.

It was during the investiture at Buckingham Palace that Holmes admitted to King George V that he had lied about his age and joined the army at age 17.

Sergeant Tommy Holmes, VC, returned to Owen Sound after the war to great fanfare and received a hero's welcome. On 16 September 1919, he was chosen to be part of the colour party for the laying-up of the 147th (Grey) Battalion's colours in the Carnegie Library, Owen Sound.

== Citation ==
The following is the citation for Holmes' Victoria Cross.

For most conspicuous bravery and resource when the right flank of our attack was held up by heavy machine-gun and rifle fire from a ‘pill-box’ strong point. Heavy casualties were producing a critical situation when Pte. Holmes, on his own initiative and single-handed, ran forward and threw two bombs, killing and wounding the crews of two machine guns. He then returned to his comrades, secured another bomb, and again rushed forward alone under heavy fire and threw the bomb into the entrance of the ‘pill-box,’ causing the nineteen occupants to surrender. By this act of valour at a very critical moment Pte. Holmes undoubtedly cleared the way for the advance of our troops and saved the lives of many of his comrades.

— (London Gazette, No. 30471, 11 January 1918)

== Later life ==
After the war Holmes was a pilot for the Harbour Commission for fifteen years. In 1936 he and another officer saved the lives of three persons whose auxiliary cabin boat upset in the harbour. In 1935 his home was robbed and the Victoria Cross was stolen. In 1942 Holmes narrowly escaped death when his launch exploded.

Holmes died of cancer on 4 January 1950 and was buried at Greenwood Cemetery in Owen Sound on 7 January 1950 with full military honours. His memorial service was attended by Victoria Cross recipients Henry Howey Robson, Colin Fraser Barron and Walter Leigh Rayfield. Annually on Remembrance Day, a firing party from the Grey and Simcoe Foresters, which perpetuates the 147th Battalion, fires a volley over his grave. Of significance is that two other VC recipients are also buried at Greenwood Cemetery, Air Marshal Billy Bishop and Major David Vivian Currie.

A replica of Thomas Holmes's VC medal is now on display at the Owen Sound Royal Canadian Legion Branch No. 6.

In 1986, the Owen Sound Armoury, being the Grey County home of the Grey and Simcoe Foresters, was renamed the "Tommy Holmes, VC, Memorial Armoury."

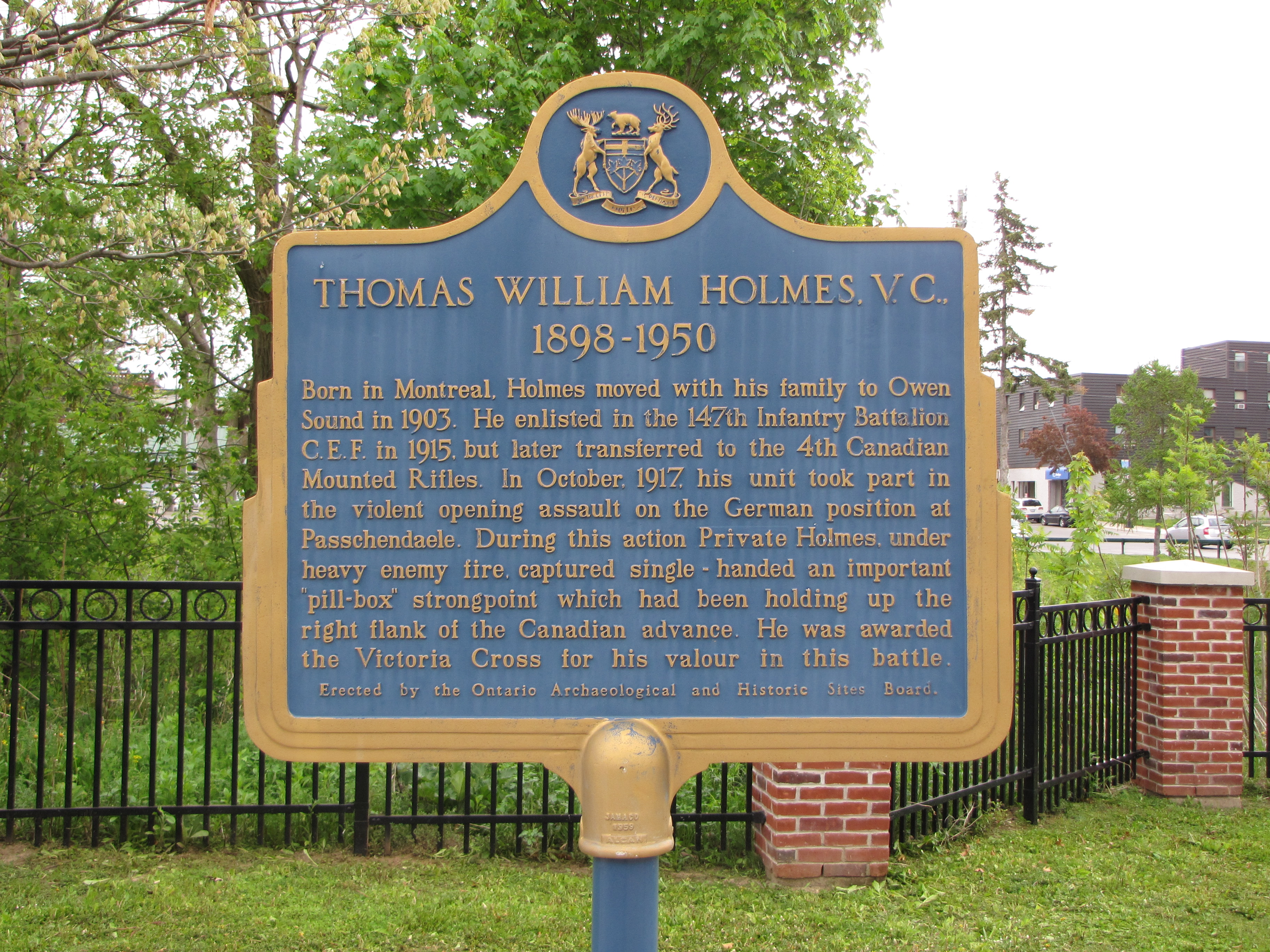
