= Alfred B. Thompson =

Canadian Air Force officer (1915–1985)

Flight Lieutenant Alfred Burke Thompson
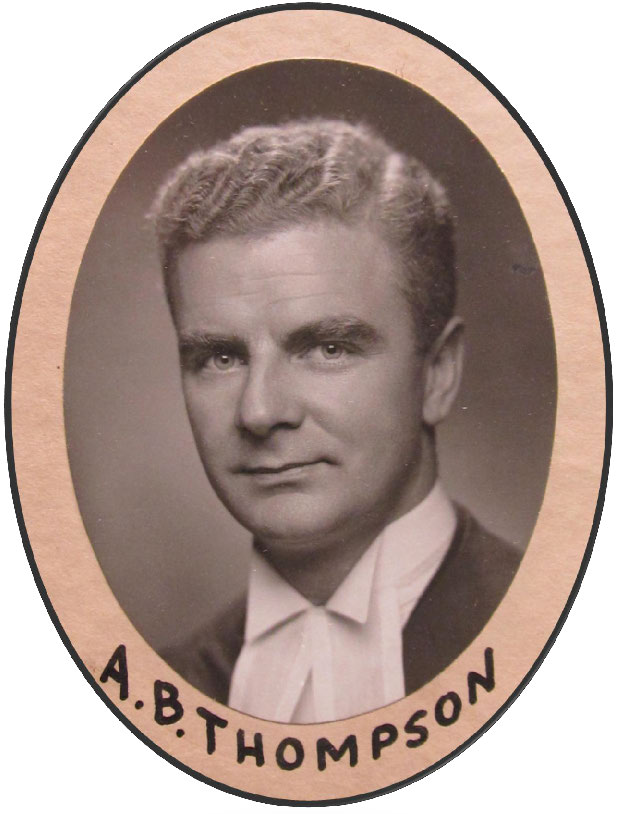
- Thompson in barrister's garb, 1948
- Born: August 8, 1915; Penetanguishene, Ontario, Canada
- Died: August 7, 1985 (aged 69); Penetanguishene, Ontario, Canada
- Burial place: St. James-On-The-Lines Anglican Cemetery, Penetanguishene
- Military career
- Allegiance: United Kingdom; Canada
- Service: Royal Air Force; Royal Canadian Air Force
- Nicknames: Aff, Tommy, A.B.
- Unit: 102 Squadron, RAF
- Conflicts: World War II

Alfred Burke Thompson (1915–1985), was an officer in the Royal Air Force and then the Royal Canadian Air Force, was the first Canadian taken prisoner in World War II, was a participant in the 'Great Escape', and was the Canadian who was the longest ever held as a prisoner of war.

== Early life ==
Alfred Burke Thompson was born on August 8, 1915, at Penetanguishene, Ontario, Canada, a small town on Georgian Bay about 82 miles (132 km) north of Toronto. His father, who was also named Alfred Burke Thompson, was a prominent lawyer and politician in the area. At the time of Thompson's birth, his father, aged 53, was the sitting Member of the Legislative Assembly of Ontario (or MLA, known today as MPP) for the riding of Simcoe Centre. (Thompson's father later sat in Canada's House of Commons as the Member of Parliament for Simcoe East from 1925 to 1935.) His mother was Marie Alberta Thompson (née McFadyen), aged 30. Alfred senior and Alberta had wed just the year before, in 1914; it was a second marriage for Alfred, who was a childless widower, and a first marriage for Alberta. Alfred junior was the couple's first child. He was quickly followed by three others: Donald, Ruth and William John. The growing family resided at 15 Water Street in Penetanguishene. In 1921 (when Thompson was six years old), his mother died, reportedly from diabetes.

== Military service and prisoner of war ==
=== Canadian Militia ===
Thompson's first experience of military life was in April 1933, at the age of 17, when he enlisted as a part-time reservist in The Simcoe Foresters, a local infantry unit of the Canadian Non-Permanent Active Militia in which his father too had once served. He joined as a private, but in December 1934 was commissioned as a 2nd lieutenant. (In December 1936, The Simcoe Foresters were amalgamated with The Grey Regiment to form The Grey and Simcoe Foresters.) Thompson ultimately resigned his commission in The Grey and Simcoe Foresters, effective March 7, 1937, upon being granted a commission in the Royal Air Force.

=== Pre-War RAF service ===
In 1936, Thompson went to Britain to become a pilot in the Royal Air Force (RAF). At the time, Canada's small air force had far more applicants than it could accept. The RAF, however, was expanding in the face of the threat posed by Nazi Germany, providing another option for young air-minded Canadians like Thompson. (Allen John Blackwell of Penetanguishene, a longtime friend of Thompson's, was another Canadian who in 1937 joined the RAF as an officer and pilot trainee.) Thompson, under RAF sponsorship, began elementary flight training at a civilian flying school in Hamble, Hampshire, in late December 1936. Upon successfully completing this course, he formally resigned his commission in the Canadian militia on March 7, 1937. The following day, he was granted a short service commission in the RAF (General Duties Branch) as an acting pilot officer (on probation), with a commitment to four years of active service. His commission was retroactively effective from December 21, 1936. On March 8, 1937, Thompson commenced initial officer's training at the RAF Depot. He then went to No. 5 Flying Training School, at RAF Sealand in northeastern Wales, where he began intermediate flying training on April 11. From May 9 to 14, however, he was attached to No. 3 School of Technical Training for the parachute course. During his time at Sealand, he was awarded the pilot's flying badge (or “wings”) on June 25, 1937.

[Thompson was not the first in his family to become a pilot. A first cousin, Alfred ("Fred") Hamilton Thompson (1892-1918), also from Penetanguishene, flew operationally in France with the RFC and RAF during World War I, as first an observer and then a pilot. Fred - serving at the time in 58 Squadron, RAF - died of injuries in September 1918, a couple of days after his airplane crashed near the front lines.]

In November 1937, Thompson was posted to 102 Squadron for flying duties. At that time, 102 Squadron was a night bomber unit stationed at RAF Honington, Suffolk, and equipped with the Heyford, a large twin-engined, open-cockpit, biplane bomber. On the first anniversary of his service in the RAF (i.e. on December 21, 1937), Thompson was confirmed as a pilot officer. In July 1938, 102 Squadron moved to RAF Driffield, Yorkshire, where in October it began to convert to the twin-engined Whitley Mk III, which by the standards of the day was a modern heavy bomber.

=== War service (including as a PoW) ===
On September 3, 1939, Britain declared war on Nazi Germany. Thompson flew his first operational sortie on the night of September 4–5, dropping propaganda leaflets on Germany. His second operational mission, another leaflet-dropping raid to the Ruhr Valley in Germany, was a few days later on the night of September 8–9. That night he was flying as second pilot in a Whitley Mk III, no. K8950 (code letters DY-M). The pilot and aircraft commander was Squadron Leader Stephen S. Murray. Several hours into the trip, the aircraft developed engine trouble and was unable to maintain altitude. Because the pilots were not able to make a forced landing (given that the earth's surface could not be clearly seen in the nighttime darkness), all five crewmen safely parachuted to the ground near Kassel, Germany. (Both at the time and over the subsequent years, there have been various contradictory narratives of why the aircraft went down, but Thompson himself maintained that engine trouble was the reason.) The crewmen were all soon captured. Thompson was the first Canadian to be taken as a prisoner of war (PoW) in World War II. At the time of his capture, Britain had been at war for six days; Canada would not enter the war until the following day.

Captured RAF aircrewmen were somewhat of a novelty at this early point in the war. This led to Thompson being taken for a brief meeting with Hermann Göring, commander-in-chief of the Luftwaffe (i.e. the German air force). Göring was surprised to learn that Thompson was a Canadian; they then spoke about Canadian ice hockey of which Göring was a fan. Propaganda photos and film were taken of Thompson. He was subsequently, over time, held at various PoW camps, ultimately ending up at Stalag Luft 3 near Sagan, Germany (today Żagań, Poland). Interestingly, Thompson was not the first in his family line to be a PoW: his great-grandfather William Thompson, a captain in the Canadian Militia and a veteran of the legendary Battle of Queenston Heights, was captured by American forces during the Anglo-American War of 1812 (as was one of William's brothers too) and sent to a prison camp in Massachusetts.

The Canadian Red Cross Society, to ameliorate the hardships of life in a PoW camp, almost immediately began dispatching parcels to Thompson. Within roughly two months of his capture, the Red Cross had sent him a parcel of clothing and "other necessities." By February 1942, the Red Cross was sending him eight parcels of food each month to supplement his prison camp diet.

On August 2, 1942, when Thompson had been a PoW for almost three years, his father, aged 80, died in Penetanguishene after a short illness. It was reported that Thompson's being a PoW had been causing his father “increasing anxiety” over those years.

During his time as a PoW, Thompson's air force status periodically changed. He was promoted to flying officer on September 21, 1939, and to flight lieutenant on December 21, 1940. Also on that latter date (Dec. 21, 1940), which marked the expiration of four years from the effective date of his short service commission, Thompson was “transferred to the Reserve and retained on the Active List.” On November 24, 1944, he was in effect transferred from the RAF to the Royal Canadian Air Force (RCAF) – that is, he “relinquished” his RAF commission upon appointment to the RCAF as a flight lieutenant.

The most notable event in which Thompson was involved during his years in captivity was the mass escape of PoWs from the Stalag Luft 3 prison camp, an event that was later dubbed ‘the Great Escape.’ Through meticulous planning, ingenuity, determination and much hard work, the PoWs over eleven months had dug a tunnel a distance of 336 horizontal feet (102 m), reaching out of the camp. On the night of March 24–25, 1944, 76 PoWs escaped through this tunnel. Thompson was the 68th man to go out through it. The plan was for 200 PoWs to break out that night; but in the midst of the escape, due to problems and delays that were experienced, this was reduced to a maximum of about 100. As it turned out, 76 PoWs got away before the escape came to a premature end, when a German guard came across a PoW outside the wire and raised the alarm.

Once he was clear of the tunnel, Thompson quickly – as he had planned – paired up with Flight Lieutenant Bill Cameron, a fellow Canadian. They began moving away from the camp as quickly as they could. The going was tough. The winter weather at the time was severe - temperatures were bitterly cold and deep snow covered the ground. When daylight dawned, Thompson and Cameron hid in some brush. The following night, they continued moving and soon came across two British escapees, Flight Lieutenants Brian Evans and Charles ("Chaz") Hall, and joined up with them. In the early morning of March 26, the four sheltered in a barn. Cameron was increasingly suffering the effects of hypothermia and exposure. The other three continued on their way, after leaving Cameron with as much warm clothing as they could spare as well as some rations. They also left the barn door wide open, in the hope that Cameron would be quickly found. He was in fact soon found and re-captured. Thompson, Evans and Hall covered only a couple more kilometres before they too were re-captured at the edge of a village.

Thompson, after being apprehended, was taken to a prison in Sagan and then, within a day or two, was moved, together with several other re-captured escapees, to a prison in Görlitz. At Görlitz, Thompson was interrogated by the Gestapo. Following that, he was in due course returned to Stalag Luft III, where he spent some time in the "cooler."

In the aftermath of the escape, the Gestapo, acting on an order that had originated with Hitler himself, shot to death 50 of the 73 recaptured officers (including six Canadians). This was a violation of international treaties to which Germany was a party and of customary international law - it was in law murder. Like Thompson, Flight Lieutenant Bill Cameron, with whom Thompson had paired up after clearing the tunnel, survived. However, the two British escapees whom Thompson and Cameron came across, Flight Lieutenants Evans and Hall, were among those murdered by the Gestapo. Only three of the escapees succeeded in ultimately reaching the United Kingdom.

Thompson remained a PoW until almost the end of the war in Europe, having spent almost every day of the war in captivity. He was held longer as a PoW - more than five-and-a-half years - than any other Canadian ever.

Thompson was honourably released from active service in the RCAF on November 16, 1945. He was awarded three medals to recognize his war service: the 1939-45 Star, the Canadian Volunteer Service Medal (with overseas clasp), and the War Medal 1939-45. In early 2013 - almost 68 years after the end of the war! - the British government authorized a "Bomber Command" clasp for the 1939-45 Star; Thompson presumably qualifies for this clasp too, rather than Canada's similar Bomber Command bar, as he met the criteria for it while serving as a member of the RAF.

== Postwar life ==
Following his return to Canada, Thompson promptly pursued a career in law. In Ontario at that time, to become a lawyer one had to work in a law office under articles of clerkship (in effect an apprenticeship) for three years; the prospective lawyer also had to attend classes part-time at Osgoode Hall Law School, which in those days was directly operated by the Law Society of Upper Canada and offered a non-degree professional training program. Thompson completed the program and was called to the Bar of Ontario in 1948. He then established a law practice in his hometown of Penetanguishene.

In Toronto on June 17, 1946, Thompson married Nora Kathleen Jackson, who was herself a war veteran having served in the Women's Royal Canadian Naval Service (or WRCNS). Together they would raise eight children. As well, Thompson served for several years in the 1950s as an elected member of the Penetanguishene town council and was the town's mayor in 1957 and 1958.

In 1966, Thompson became an Assistant Crown Attorney (i.e. a criminal prosecutor). In 1967, he received the honour of being appointed Queen's Counsel. He remained a member of the Crown Attorney's Office in Barrie and Simcoe County until retiring in 1980.

Thompson died on August 7, 1985, in Penetanguishene. His remains are interred in the cemetery at the historic St. James on-the-Lines Anglican Church, Penetanguishene.
