= Grey and Simcoe Foresters =

The Grey and Simcoe Foresters
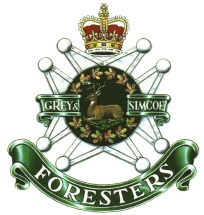
- Regimental badge
- Active: 1866–present
- Country: Canada
- Branch: Canadian Army
- Type: Line infantry
- Role: Light infantry
- Size: One battalion
- Part of: 32 Canadian Brigade Group
- Garrison/HQ: Barrie and Owen Sound, Ontario
- Mottos: Tenacious and Versatile
- March: "The 31st Greys"
- Decorations: North-West Rebellion; First World War; Second World War; War in Afghanistan
- Battle honours: See #Battle honours
- Website: army-armee.forces.gc.ca/en/grey-simcoe-foresters/index.page

Commanders
- Colonel-in-Chief: Anne, Princess Royal
- Commanding Officer: Lt Col M. Lacroix
- Regimental Sergeant Major: CWO J. Bull

The Grey and Simcoe Foresters is a Primary Reserve infantry regiment of the Canadian Forces. Within the Canadian Army, it is part of the 4th Canadian Division's (formerly known as Land Force Central Area) 32 Canadian Brigade Group. Due to the restructuring of the British Army, The Worcestershire and Sherwood Foresters Regiment was amalgamated into The Mercian Regiment, as its 2nd Battalion (Worcesters and Foresters), leaving The Grey and Simcoe Foresters as the only remaining unit in the Commonwealth of Nations known to be distinctly designated as a regiment of Foresters.

== Origin and regimental lineage ==
While many regiments of fusiliers, grenadiers and highlanders may be found in the armies of the Commonwealth, only one regiment of foresters exist – The Grey and Simcoe Foresters of the Canadian Army. The Canadian Foresters have had a unique history that has lived up to its rural versatility and spirit. The Foresters have enjoyed one of the most diverse roles in the Canadian Army, serving as infantry, armoured and artillery. Previously, The Worcestershire and Sherwood Foresters of the British Army also held this title, however, due to restructuring into The Mercian Regiment, only one holder of this name now exists.

Foresters are a very old form of infantry finding its antecedents in Robin Hood’s Sherwood Forest. The Grey and Simcoe Foresters were formed from the 1936 amalgamation of the 31st Grey Regiment and the 35th Simcoe Foresters both originally gazetted on September 14, 1866. Following the 1837 Rebellion, the Government of Upper Canada retained in January 1838 one troop of cavalry and three militia battalions on active service along the Niagara River and in Toronto. One of these battalions was a composite made up of soldiers from the two Simcoe County battalions of that era. This composite battalion, under the command of Lieutenant-Colonel Carthew, was known as the 1st Simcoe Incorporated Militia (Royal Foresters). This is the earliest known reference to the Simcoe County militia as "Foresters."

== Armorial description ==
The badge of The Grey and Simcoe Foresters is armorially described as, resting on a scroll vert inscribed "FORESTERS" argent a maltese cross argent charged with a pomme bearing a stag couchant upon a mount proper encircled wreath of autumnal maple leaves on the sinister arm of the cross and extending to the wreath a demi scroll vert inscribed "GREY &" argent on the dexter arm of the cross and extending to the wreath a demi scroll vert inscribed "SIMCOE" argent the whole ensigned with the Crown.

The badge was adopted upon the amalgamation of the Grey Regiment and the Simcoe Foresters in December 1936, and is based upon the former badge of the allied regiment, the Sherwood Foresters, perpetuated by the present-day 2nd Battalion (Worcesters and Foresters), Mercian Regiment

The regimental camp flag is Lincoln green over hunting scarlet on the diagonal and bears the badge in silver and gold in the upper left.

== Lineage ==
=== The Grey and Simcoe Foresters ===
- Originated on 14 September 1866, in Owen Sound, Canada West, as the 31st Grey Battalion of Infantry
- Redesignated on 8 May 1900, as the 31st Grey Regiment
- Redesignated on 1 May 1920, as The Grey Regiment
- Amalgamated on 15 December 1936, with The Simcoe Foresters and Redesignated as The Grey and Simcoe Foresters
- Redesignated on 7 November 1940, as the 2nd (Reserve) Battalion, The Grey and Simcoe Foresters
- Redesignated on 1 November 1943, as The Grey and Simcoe Foresters (Reserve)
- Converted on 1 April 1946, to Artillery and Redesignated as the 45th Anti-Tank Regiment (Grey and Simcoe Foresters), RCA
- Redesignated on 19 June 1947, as the 45th Anti-Tank Regiment (Self-Propelled) (Grey and Simcoe Foresters), RCA
- Amalgamated on 1 October 1954, with the 55th Light Anti-Aircraft Regiment, RCA, Converted to Armour and Redesignated as The Grey and Simcoe Foresters (28th Armoured Regiment)
- Redesignated on 19 May 1958, as The Grey and Simcoe Foresters (RCAC)
- Converted on 1 September 1970, to Infantry and Redesignated as The Grey and Simcoe Foresters

=== The Simcoe Foresters ===
- Originated on 14 September 1866, in Barrie, Canada West, as the 35th Simcoe Battalion of Infantry
- Redesignated on 5 April 1867, as the 35th Battalion The Simcoe Foresters
- Redesignated on 8 May 1900, as the 35th Regiment Simcoe Foresters
- Redesignated on 1 May 1920, as The Simcoe Foresters
- Amalgamated on 15 December 1936, with The Grey Regiment and Redesignated as The Grey and Simcoe Foresters

=== 55th Light Anti-Aircraft Regiment, RCA ===
- Originated on 1 April 1946, in Windsor, Ontario, as the 55th Light Anti-Aircraft Regiment, RCA
- Amalgamated on 1 October 1954, with the 45th Anti-Tank Regiment (Self-Propelled) (Grey and Simcoe Foresters), RCA

=== Lineage chart ===
Lineage chart

1855	Independent infy and rifle coys
1862	Independent infy and rifle coys
1866	31st "Grey Bn of Infy"	35th "Simcoe Bn of Infy"
1867	35th Bn "The Simcoe Foresters"
1885	Active service (Note: Four companies, April–July)
1900	31st Grey Regt	35th Regt "Simcoe Foresters"
1915	147th "Overseas" Bn, CEF	157th "Overseas" Bn, CEF
1916	Absorbed by 1st, 19th, 116th and 125th "Overseas" Bn	177th "Overseas" Bn, CEF
1917	Absorbed by 8th Reserve Bn	248th "Overseas" Bn, CEF	Absorbed by 3rd Reserve Bn
1917	Absorbed by 8th Reserve Bn
1920	1st Bn (147th Bn, CEF), The Grey Regt	2nd Bn, (Note: Reserve) The Grey Regt	1st Bn (157th Bn, CEF), The Simcoe Foresters	2nd Bn (177th Bn, CEF), The Simcoe Foresters
1936	Disbanded	Disbanded
1936	The Grey and Simcoe Foresters
1940	The Grey and Simcoe Foresters, CASF
1940	1st Bn, The Grey and Simcoe Foresters, CASF	2nd (Reserve) Bn, The Grey and Simcoe Foresters
1942	26th Army Tank Bn (The Grey and Simcoe Foresters), CAC, CASF
1942	26th Army Tank Regt (Grey and Simcoe Foresters), CAC, CASF
1943	Disbanded	The Grey and Simcoe Foresters (Reserve)
1946	45th Anti-Tank Regt (Grey and Simcoe Foresters), RCA	55th Light Anti-Aircraft Regt, RCA
1947	45th Anti-Tank Regt (Self-Propelled) (Grey and Simcoe Foresters), RCA
1954	The Grey and Simcoe Foresters (28th Armd Regt)
1958	The Grey and Simcoe Foresters (RCAC)
1970	The Grey and Simcoe Foresters

== History ==
=== Early history ===
The 31st Grey Battalion of Infantry was organized in Grey County and formed from six independent and rifle companies in Owen Sound, Meaford, Leith, Durham and Flesherton, and was gazetted on 14 September 1866. These companies had been created in the 1850s. Lieutenant-Colonel W.D. Pollard was the first commanding officer of the 31st Greys. Concurrently in Simcoe County, the independent infantry and rifle companies in Barrie, Collingwood, Cookstown, Bradford, Oro, and Orillia were organized into the 35th Battalion of Infantry (Simcoe Foresters), which was also Gazetted on 14 September 1866. Lieutenant-Colonel A.R. Stephen commanded this new battalion. Prior to their formal organization into this new battalion structure, these independent companies from Grey and Simcoe counties had deployed from 1864–66 to guard strategic points along the Canada-USA border in response to the Fenian Raids.

=== North-West Rebellion ===
In 1885, Lieutenant-Colonel W.E. O'Brien, 35th Simcoe Foresters, took command of the York-Simcoe Battalion, which was formed from four companies of the 35th Simcoe Foresters and four companies of the 12th York Rangers to counter the Riel Rebellion in western Canada. In recognition of this contribution, 35th Simcoe Foresters received its first battle honour "North West Canada 1885".

=== South Africa ===
During the Second Boer War the regiments contributed men to the Canadian contingents sent to assist the British Army. While attached to the 2nd (Special Service) Battalion, The Royal Canadian Regiment at the Battle of Paardeberg, Private James Halkett Findlay from the 35 Simcoe Foresters, became one of the first Canadians and the first Forester to be killed-in-action on Feb 18th, 1900.

During the First World War, the 31st and 35th regiments recruited men for four battalions (the 147th, 157th, 177th, and 248th (Grey) Battalion) and supplied quotas for two more, the 4th and 15th Battalions, CEF.

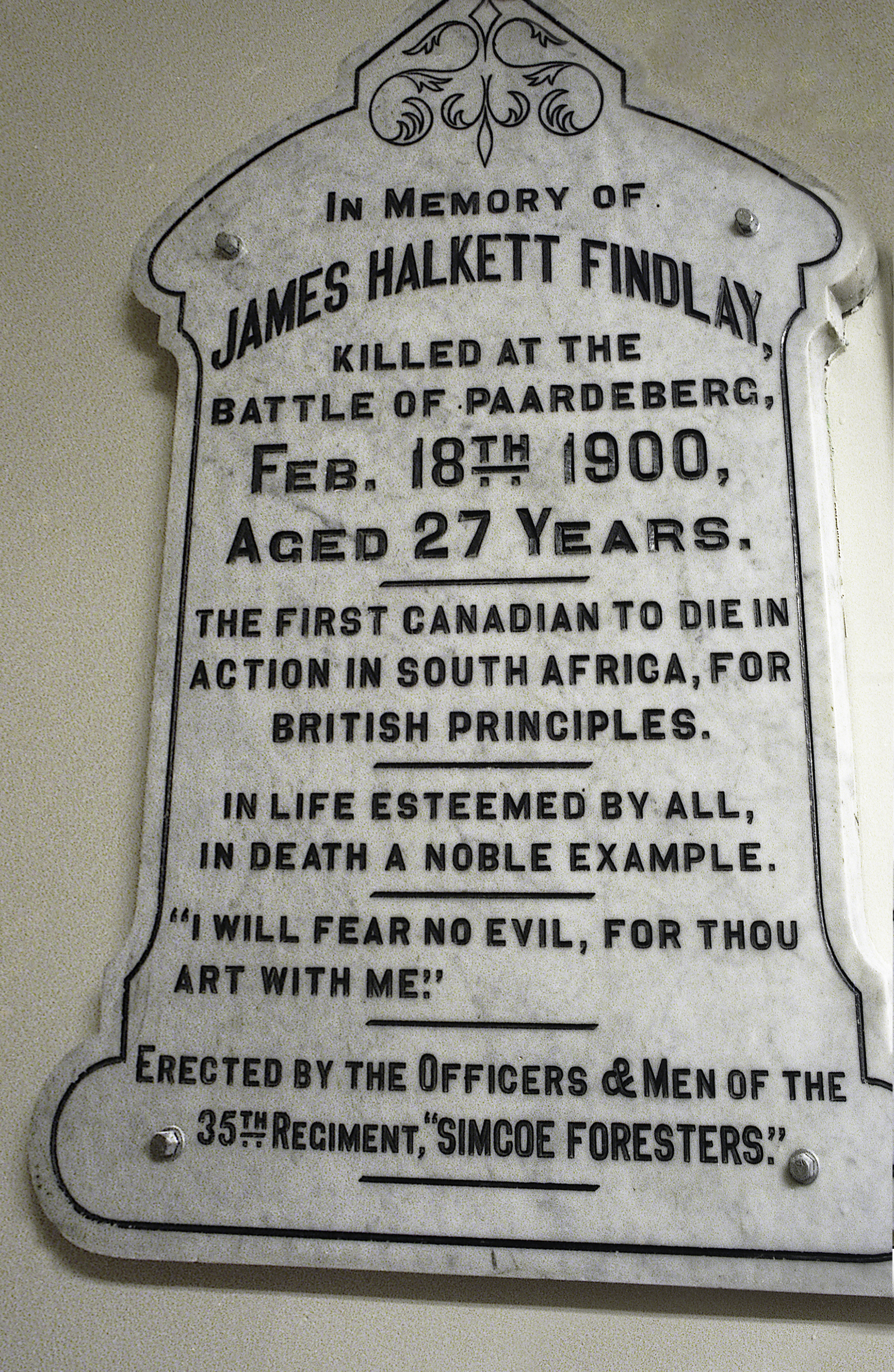
This memorial stone is currently housed at St. Andrew's Presbyterian Church, 47 Owen St, Barrie, ON, Canada

=== World War I ===
The Great War brought with it the creation of Camp Borden, where the Barrie, Ontario and Collingwood, Ontario companies of the 157th Simcoe Foresters were ordered to begin construction of the new camp in May 1916. In June, another company from Barrie arrived to help speed-up the construction. As such the 157th, under the command of Lieutenant-Colonel D.H. MacLaren, became the founding battalion of Camp Borden, which it constructed to accommodate 40 infantry battalions in 10 brigades. Before the Camp was opened the remainder of the 157th and the entire 177th, under the command of Lieutenant-Colonel J.B. McPhee, arrived. By that summer, Camp Borden was home to 36 CEF battalions in 9 brigades before they embarked overseas, including the 147th, which had been training at Camp Niagara. One 157th Simcoe Forester would later become the Premier of Ontario for four terms of office, Leslie Frost of Orillia. In 1917, Private Thomas William Holmes of the 147th Grey Battalion became Canada's youngest winner of the Victoria Cross, while assigned to the 4th Canadian Mounted Rifles. By war's end, the Grey and Simcoe counties had contributed over 6,000 soldiers, of whom several hundred were killed-in-action. The Grey's Roll of Honour alone lists 342 killed-in-action.

=== World War II ===
During World War II, the 1st Battalion was mobilized on 1 June 1940 and arrived at Camp Borden on 28 June, with a strength of 24 officers and 936 other ranks. Lieutenant-Colonel T.J. (Uncle Tom) Rutherford commanded the 1st Battalion until succeeded by Lieutenant-Colonel V.R. Fell. By war's end, Rutherford had been promoted to Brigadier was appointed as a Commander of the Order of the British Empire. The 1st Battalion left Camp Borden on 17 April 1941 and became an armoured unit overseas, while the 2nd Battalion remained in Canada as an infantry unit. On January 26, 1942, the 1st Battalion became the 26th Army Tank Battalion (later Regiment), Royal Canadian Armoured Corps. They embarked for England on June 16, 1943, having served as local protection force in Ontario and Nova Scotia since mobilization. Unfortunately, the regiment had to swallow a bitter pill when on November 1, 1943, the regiment was broken up for reinforcements. Consequently, Foresters found themselves represented in tank regiments in almost every theatre of conflict.

=== Postwar ===
Following the war the 2nd Battalion was converted to artillery becoming the 45th Anti-Tank Regiment on April 1, 1946, with the designation "(Self -Propelled)" being added on June 19, 1947. On October 1, 1954, the unit was amalgamated with the 55th Light Anti-Aircraft Regiment, RCA. The Foresters returned to the armoured corps on May 19, 1958, as the 28th Armoured Regiment.

Reverting to its original infantry role in 1970, the regiment was part of London District (now 31 Canadian Brigade Group) until transferring to 32 Canadian Brigade Group on June 19, 1995. In peacetime at home, the Foresters have responded to assistance to civil authority during 1954 Hurricane Hazel, the 1985 Barrie tornado outbreak, the 1997 Red River flood and the Ontario Ice Storm (1998), as well as to forest fires over the years. Additionally, many members have served as augmentation from the Korean War onwards, including the Middle East (UNEF II), Golan Heights (UNDOF), Cyprus (UNFICYP), the Former Yugoslavia (Croatia and Bosnia-Herzegovina) (UNPROFOR, IFOR, and SFOR) and more recently Afghanistan (ISAF) and Sierra Leone (IMATT) .

There are over 2000 soldiers currently serving in the 32 Canadian Brigade Group, 5% being Regular Forces and 95% being Reserve Forces.

The Grey and Simcoe Foresters are conveniently stationed near the 4th Canadian Division Training Centre, formerly Land Force Central Area Training Centre (LFCA TC). LFCA TC, now 4 Cdn Div TC, was designed in 1942 for the purpose of training soldiers in tank warfare and artillery gunnery. 4 Cdn Div TC's current role not only includes being tasked to provide and maintain ranges, training areas, facilities and equipment for approximately 10,000 reserve soldiers in the Ontario area, but also plays host to a variety of other countries military units and nonmilitary agencies, for training exercises.

=== War in Afghanistan ===
The regiment contributed an aggregate of more than 20% of its authorized strength to the various Task Forces which served in Afghanistan between 2002 and 2014.

== Alliances ==
- United Kingdom – The Mercian Regiment

== Battle honours ==
In the list below, battle honours in small capitals were awarded for participation in large operations and campaigns, while those in lowercase indicate honours granted for more specific battles. Battle honours in bold type are emblazoned on the regimental colour.

The now-retired colours presented in 1932 and 1978 do not include Hill 70 despite its being authorized. The regimental colour presented on May 20, 2016, includes all nine battle honours (with Arras, 1917, and Arras, 1918, combined on one scroll) and is a darker Lincoln green than its predecessors.

=== North West Rebellion ===
- **North West Canada, 1885**

=== Great War ===
- **Arras, 1917, '18**
- **Hill 70**
- **Ypres, 1917**
- **Amiens**
- **Hindenburg Line**
- **Pursuit to Mons**

=== War in Afghanistan ===
- Afghanistan

== Garrison locations ==
Regimental Headquarters, 4 and 5 Platoons "B" Company
The Armoury, 37 Parkside Drive, Barrie, Ontario
1 and 2 Platoons "A" Company
Tommy Holmes, VC, Memorial Armoury, 858 10th Street East, Owen Sound, Ontario

Site	Date(s) & Architect	Designated	Location	Province	Description	Image
Barrie Armoury	1913-14 David Ewart	1997 Recognized - Register of the Government of Canada Heritage Buildings	Barrie 37 Parkside Dr at High Street 44.38884°N 79.69634°W	Ontario	Housing 4 and 5 Platoons in "B" Company of The Grey and Simcoe Foresters, this large, mansard roofed Baronial style structure with sturdy projecting towers and a three-arched entrance is in a residential area near the centre of the city.	Cap Badge of the Grey and Simcoe Foresters
Tommy Holmes VC Memorial Armoury			Owen Sound 858 10th Street East 44.56996°N 80.93045°W	Ontario	Houses 1 and 2 Platoons in "A" Company of The Grey and Simcoe Foresters. Tommy Holmes was Canada's youngest Victoria Cross winner	Cap Badge of the Grey and Simcoe Foresters

The unit deploys as "C" Company or combined Companies.

== Colours ==
The Governor General of Canada, David Johnston, presented new colours to the regiment on 20 May 2016. The old colours were laid up in St. George's Anglican Church in Owen Sound in November 2017.

The Lieutenant-Governor of Ontario, Pauline McGibbon, presented the previous stand of colours to the regiment on 28 May 1978. The regiment had been without colours since the colours of the Simcoe Foresters, presented in 1932, were laid-up in St. Thomas Anglican Church at Shanty Bay, near Barrie, on 17 November 1946, when the regiment was converted to Royal Canadian Artillery. In 1968, a decade after reverting to armour as the 28th Armoured Regiment, Royal Canadian Armoured Corps, a guidon was approved but never produced. Two years later, The Grey and Simcoe Foresters reverted to infantry, Royal Canadian Infantry Corps. On 3 September 1983, the colours were trooped in the presence of Edward Schreyer, Governor General of Canada. In 1986, the colours were paraded with the guard of honour for Anne, Princess Royal, during her official opening of Queens Quay (Toronto).

The first colour of the 31st Grey Battalion was presented and consecrated 22 March 1867 at Annan. It had first been produced following the Fenian Raids for the Leith Rifles, which became No. 3 Company, 31st Grey Battalion. This colour was entrusted to the Telford family, which presented it to the regiment in 1962, which laid it up in the Owen Sound Officers' Mess.

The 147th Grey (Overseas) Battalion received its colours on 22 August 1916 at Camp Borden. These were laid-up for safekeeping in St. Nicholas Cathedral, Newcastle-on-Tyne, England, on 26 May 1917. They were reclaimed on 3 March 1919 and returned to Canada where they were deposited in the Owen Sound Public Library on 16 September. Eventually, they were encased in the Owen Sound Officers' Mess. In a rather unorthodox approach, a duplicate stand of 147th colours was produced in 1948 by the Grey County Council and deposited in the old County Courthouse by the association on 13 April 1949. The 248th Grey (Overseas) Battalion did not receive colours before embarking for England in 1916 and was later disbanded for reinforcements.

The 35th Simcoe Foresters received its first stand of colours on 25 May 1868, one year after Canada's Confederation, during the reign of Queen Victoria. The second stand of colours was presented on 8 July 1909 (during the reign of King Edward VII) and later laid-up in All Saints' Anglican Church Collingwood on 15 October 1932, (during the reign of King George V), following the presentation of the third stand of colours. On 17 September 2000, the 1909 colours were reclaimed by the regiment and laid-up in the regimental museum at Barrie.

The 157th Overseas Battalion (Simcoe Foresters) of the Canadian Expeditionary Force received its colours on 12 October 1916 at Camp Borden. Following the First World War this stand of colours was laid-up in St. Andrew's Presbyterian Church, Barrie, on 10 October 1919 and subsequently moved to the Simcoe County Archives on 21 July 1968 and then to the Simcoe County Museum in December 1979. On 18 June 1982, the regiment reclaimed this stand of colours and laid them up in its Barrie Officers' Mess. The 177th Overseas Battalion (Simcoe Foresters) did not receive a stand of colours during its short existence.

== Notable members ==
- Major-General Sir Sam Steele, 35th Simcoe Foresters, 31st Grey, Lord Strathcona's Horse (Royal Canadians), North-West Mounted Police, South African Constabulary
- Lieutenant-Colonel W.E. O'Brien, 35th Simcoe Foresters, Commanding Officer York-Simcoe Battalion, Riel Rebellion
- Captain Leslie Frost, 157th Battalion (Simcoe Foresters), CEF, 20th Battalion CEF, Premier of Ontario
- Major Sir Daniel Hunter McMillan, 35th Simcoe Foresters, 95th Battalion, Lieutenant Governor of Manitoba
- Private Thomas William Holmes, 147th (Grey) Battalion, CEF, 4th Canadian Mounted Rifles
- Flight Lieutenant A. B. Thompson, The Simcoe Foresters, The Grey and Simcoe Foresters, RAF, RCAF; first Canadian to become a PoW in WWII, participant in the Great Escape, the Canadian longest held ever as a PoW

== Regimental museum ==
Grey and Simcoe Foresters Regimental Museum
- Location: Mulcaster Street, Barrie, Ontario
- Type: Regimental museum

The Grey and Simcoe Foresters Regimental Museum is on Mulcaster Street, Barrie, Ontario. The museum perpetuates the history of the Grey and Simcoe Foresters as a means of instilling pride of regiment and country in new recruits and to enable the public at large to better appreciate the role of the military in the development of the area. The museum is affiliated with: CMA, CHIN, OMMC and Virtual Museum of Canada.

The museum offers a variety of artifacts from the 19th century and from both world wars. Most of the artifacts in the museum have been donated by various Simcoe and Grey Regiment members. The museum is operated and maintained by Grey and Simcoe Foresters Regiment volunteers.

== See also ==
- 4th Canadian Division
- Uniforms of the Canadian Forces
- Regimental nicknames of the Canadian Forces
- List of armouries in Canada

== Media ==
- Chajkowsky, William E. "The History of Camp Borden, 1916–18, Land of Sand, Sin and Sorrow." Vineland: Station Press, 1983.
  Fisher, Major J.R. and Captain E.J. Fuller. "The Grey and Simcoe Foresters, A Concise Regimental History." Barrie: The Grey and Simcoe Foresters, 2008 ISBN 0-9683546-1-0
  Frost, Honourable Leslie. "Fighting Men" Toronto: Clarke, Irwin, 1967
- Rutherford, Brigadier Tom, ed. "An Unofficial History of The Grey and Simcoe Foresters Regiment 1866 to 1973." Owen Sound: The Grey and Simcoe Foresters, 1974
- Telford, Major Murray M. "Scarlet to Green, the colours, uniforms and insignia of The Grey and Simcoe Foresters." Erin: The Boston Mills Press, 1987 ISBN 0-919783-82-1

== Order of precedence ==
Preceded by The Royal Highland Fusiliers of Canada	The Grey and Simcoe Foresters	Succeeded by The Lorne Scots (Peel, Dufferin and Halton Regiment)
