= Elmes Yelverton Steele =

British naval officer (1781–1865)

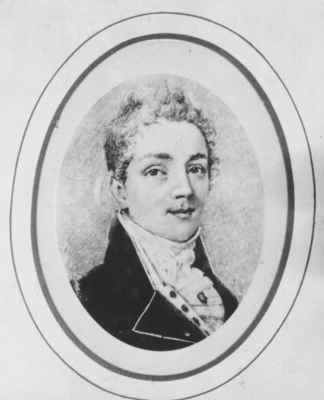

Member of the Legislative Assembly of the Province of Canada for Simcoe
- In office 1841–1844
- Preceded by: New position
- Succeeded by: William Benjamin Robinson

Personal details
- Born: February 6, 1781 Coleford, Gloucestershire, England
- Died: August 6, 1865 (aged 84) Medonte Township, Canada West
- Party: Independent Reformer
- Spouse(s): (1) Elizabeth Seeley Coucher (m. 1809) (2) Anne MacIan Macdonald (m. 1847)
- Children: Twelve children, six with each wife; included Sir Samuel Benfield Steele
- Occupation: Naval officer, landowner

Military service
- Allegiance: Britain; Upper Canada
- Branch/service: Royal Navy; Upper Canada Militia
- Years of service: 1798 – 1858
- Rank: Commander; Lieutenant-Colonel
- Unit: HMS Mercury; HMS Leopard; Simcoe Militia
- Battles/wars: Napoleonic Wars; Action of 16 October 1799; Chesapeake–Leopard affair; Upper Canada Rebellion

Elmes Yelverton Steele (February 6, 1781 – August 6, 1865) was a British naval officer, and militia officer, farmer and political figure in Canada West, Province of Canada. The father of a large family, one of his sons was Sam Steele, an officer in the early days of the North-West Mounted Police.

== Early life and naval career ==
He was born in Coleford, Gloucestershire, England in 1781. He was the son of Elmes Steel (d.1824), surgeon of Coleford, and Mary Benfield (1749–1831). He was one of ten children. Two of his brothers served as officers in the Royal Navy and three as officers in the British Army. His uncle, Colonel Samuel Steele, served in Quebec under Lord Amherst.

Like two of his brothers, he joined the Royal Navy as an officer cadet in 1798 and served during the Napoleonic Wars rising to the rank of Lieutenant. He retired from the navy in 1812 on half-pay. He settled in France, but returned to England at the start of the French Revolution of 1830.

== Upper Canada ==
In 1832, Steele and his son John emigrated to Upper Canada, where as a British officer, Steele was entitled to a land grant. He settled on a large farm, 1,000 acres in size, in Medonte Township, north of Lake Simcoe. The rest of his family joined him the next year. In 1833, he was named a justice of the peace.

When the Upper Canada Rebellion broke out in 1837, Steele raised a group of volunteers from the township to help put down the rebellion. His group marched to Barrie where they were issued firearms, and then to Toronto. By the time they arrived, Montgomery's Tavern was in ashes and the rebellion was essentially over.

Steele had a strong interest in local improvements. With others, he signed a petition in 1839 advocating the development of a water route connecting the Bay of Quinte to Lake Huron. They argued that it would improve internal trade from the upper Great Lakes to Upper Canada and to Lower Canada, and also provide an internal communications line in the event of another war with the United States.

== Political career ==
=== Riot at Finch's Tavern ===
Following the rebellions in both Upper Canada and Lower Canada, political change was in the air. In October 1839, Steele chaired a public meeting at Finch's Tavern in Toronto, called to discuss the proposals contained in Lord Durham's Report. The reform-minded meeting voted to support Durham's proposal for responsible government. A Tory group, led by the sheriff of the Home District, William Botsford Jarvis, broke up the meeting, and one unarmed Reform supporter was killed. Steele became known as an ardent Reformer as a result, although he had not previously been interested in politics,.

=== 1841 election ===
Steele stood for election for the Simcoe riding in the general election of 1841. He was a candidate for the first Legislative Assembly of the Province of Canada, formed in 1841 from the union of Lower Canada and Upper Canada, as recommended by Lord Durham. Steele campaigned for better roads and improved military pensions, an attractive plank for the Simcoe area, where many settlers were veterans. He was also sympathetic to those who had been led into rebellion, as he agreed that the power of the oligarchic Family Compact had to be broken. He supported the union of the Canada because he thought that union would reduce the Family Compact's influence.

The Simcoe election of 1841 was hotly contested. Steele's opponent was William Benjamin Robinson, who had been the member from Simcoe in the Legislative Assembly of Upper Canada for the previous decade. Robinson was a member of the Family Compact, being a brother of Sir John Robinson, one of the leaders of the Family Compact. The poll opened on March 8 in Barrie, the only polling location for the county, and remained open for a week. There were rumours of planned violence and much physical contention between the supporters of the two candidates. A detachment of a regiment from Toronto was stationed in nearby Kempenfelt Bay, but was not actually called out. Polling was by open ballot, where voters publicly declared their vote for their candidate. Supporters of the two candidates vied for physical possession of the hustings, where the voting occurred. Steele's supporters portrayed him as a Reformer and a friend of the backwoodsman, using the symbol of an axe with an elm handle and a steel head, a play on his name. In the end, Steele was elected.

=== Legislative Assembly ===
Once in the Legislative Assembly, Steele was a moderate Reformer with an independent streak. In the first session, held in the fall of 1841, he voted in favour of the union of the two Canadas, and was a consistent supporter of the Governor General, Lord Sydenham, often on the other side of issues from the ultra-Reformers led by Robert Baldwin. However, in subsequent sessions, he tended to vote with Baldwin, particularly on the issue of responsible government. During his term in office, he successfully lobbied for improvements on the road connecting Orillia and Toronto. He also lobbied for improvements to military pensions.

Steele did not stand for re-election in the general election of 1844. The expenses of the 1841 election had a significant impact on his personal finances, and some of his former supporters felt that he had not been a strong enough voter in favour of reform, in light of his early support for Lord Sydenham.

== Later life and family ==
Steele had accepted retirement from the Royal Navy in 1838, with the rank of Commander, after forty years on the rolls. He continued to serve in the local militia, reaching the rank of lieutenant-colonel. He retired from politics, concentrating his energies on local matters, his work as a justice of the peace, and the local Anglican church, which he had endowed.

Steele was married twice. His first marriage, in 1809, was to Elizabeth Seeley Coucher. They had six children. His second marriage, in 1847, was to Anne MacIan Macdonald. They also had six children, one of whom was Major-General Sir Samuel Steele, one of the first members of the North-West Mounted Police, and later a commander of Lord Strathcona's Horse in the Second Boer War.

Steele died in Medonte Township in 1865, aged 84.
