= South African Constabulary =

- Active: September 1900 - June 1908
- Country: South Africa
- Allegiance: British Empire
- Type: Paramilitary Mounted Infantry
- Role: Military Police; Scouts
- Size: 10,000 maximum
- Engagements: Second Boer War; Bambatha Rebellion

Commanders
- Notable commanders: Robert Baden-Powell; Sam Steele

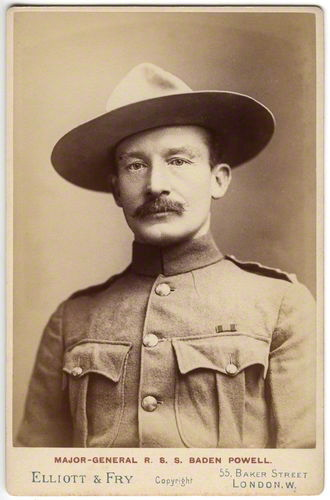
Robert Baden-Powell, the first Inspector- General of the South African Constabulary.

The South African Constabulary (SAC) was a paramilitary force set up in 1900 under British Army control to police areas captured from the two independent Boer republics of Transvaal and Orange Free State during the Second Boer War. Its first Inspector-General was Major-General Robert Baden-Powell, later the founder of the worldwide Scout Movement. After hostilities ended in 1902, the two countries became British colonies and the force was disbanded in 1908.

== Establishment ==
With the capture of Pretoria and Johannesburg by the British in the summer of 1900, a garrison force of paramilitary soldiers was required to continue occupation and military duties in the area. In June, the Provisional Transvaal Constabulary was established as an irregular paramilitary force of mounted soldiers intended for use in the vicinity of Pretoria. Men were drawn from the Imperial Yeomanry and Brabant’s Horse, and served on garrison duties in the city. By September, a more permanent force was required for duties across the Transvaal.

On 22 October 1900, Field-Marshal Lord Roberts, commander-in-chief of Imperial forces in South Africa, issued Proclamation 24 which founded the SAC.

The first Inspector-General of the force was Major-General Baden-Powell, who earlier in the war had been in command of the British garrison at the Siege of Mafeking. He showed exceptional ability in organising a force from scratch in a short space of time. In South Africa he recruited men from the two British colonies of the Cape and Natal and from overseas men from the British Empire:

- Canada (many from "C" Battery and "B" Battery, RCFA, led by Sam Steele)
- India
- Ceylon
- Australia
- New Zealand

At first the force was organised in four divisions, with each being commanded by a colonel and one assistant. Three of the divisions were in the Transvaal and one in the Orange River Colony. Each division was subdivided into troops of 100 men, each commanded by a captain and supported by a lieutenant.

Baden-Powell designed the uniform of the SAC, which he later adapted for the Boy Scout movement.

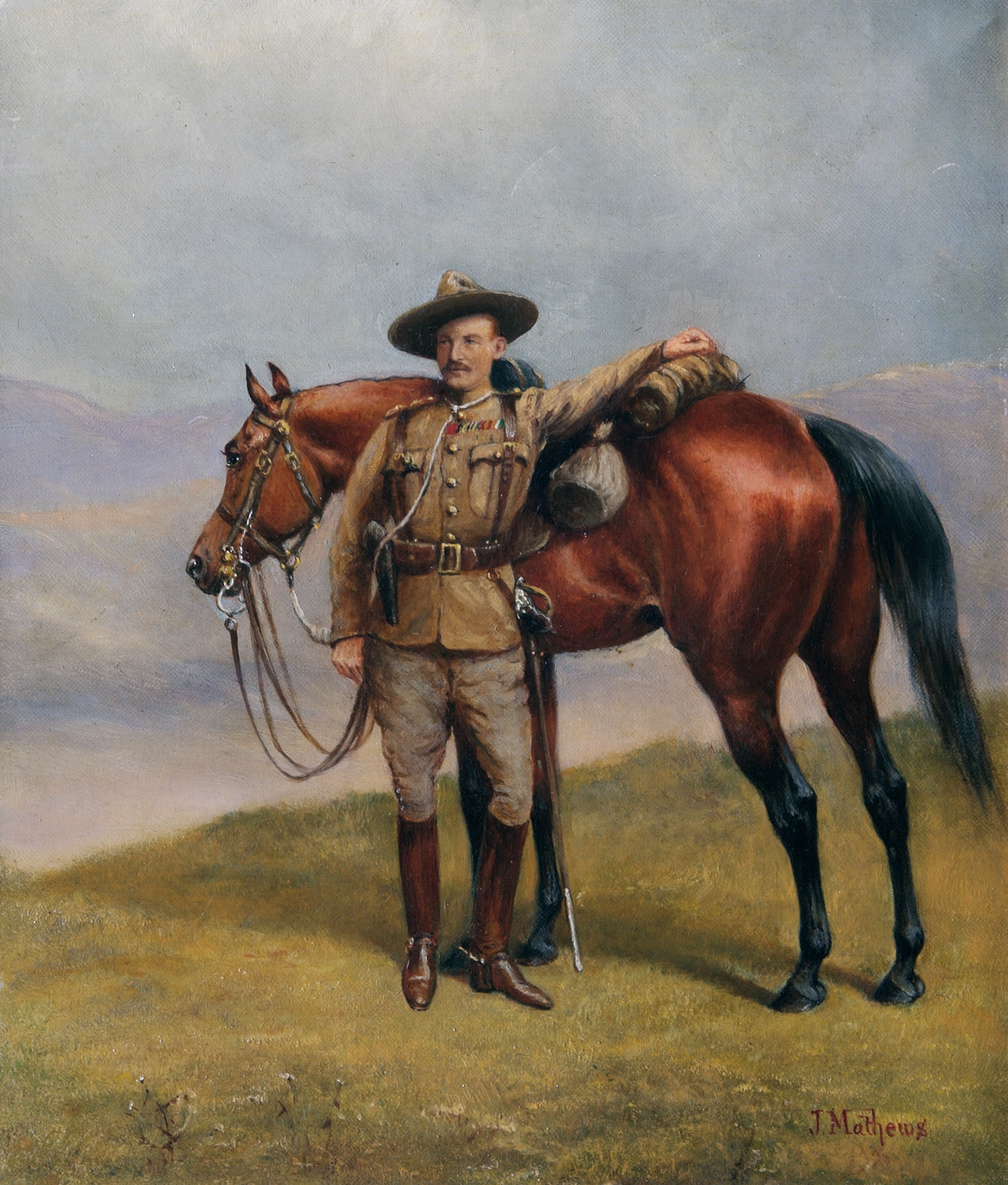
Robert Baden-Powell in uniform of the South African Constabulary

== Operations ==
Boer resistance lasted far longer than the British had envisaged, with peace not being agreed until May 1902, and until then the SAC was involved in military rather than policing duties, being engaged in field operations and on blockhouse lines.

Once hostilities were over, each troop took up its assigned position in the two new colonies as soon as possible. In this way a network of posts and patrols was established in a very short space of time. With the SAC patrolling in every direction, including the Portuguese and Tongaland frontiers, they also visited all the farms at least once a week. By the beginning of August 1902, 28 districts, 64 sub-districts and 210 stations across South Africa were occupied and the force had over 10,000 men. A medical structure was set up, with a first-aid corporal attached to each 100-man troop, a surgeon for any area where a number of troops might be stationed and an SAC hospital for each district.

In November 1902, the size of the force was reduced to 6 000 men and after further reductions it was down to 4,000 men in 1906. During this time, a commission of enquiry was appointed to look into the administration and organisation of the SAC. The commission divided the force into two divisions in the Transvaal and the Orange River Colony and changed the military ranks into civilian ones, for example captains became inspectors and lieutenants became sub-inspectors. By May 1908, after further reductions, there were 1,068 police of European ancestry in the Transvaal and 674 in the Orange River Colony.

== Dissolution ==
The South African Constabulary was disbanded on 2 June 1908. Many of the members from other countries made South Africa their permanent home and their records in the National Archives of South Africa give comprehensive information, including a physical description, their date and place of birth, marital status, occupation at entry, religion, name and address of next of kin, and details of promotions and transfers.
