= 157th Battalion (Simcoe Foresters), CEF =

Canadian military unit from WW1

The 157th (Simcoe Foresters) Battalion, CEF was a unit in the Canadian Expeditionary Force during the First World War.

On 30 November 1915, the 35th Regiment "Simcoe Foresters" was authorized to raise the 157th Battalion. Based in Barrie, Ontario, the 157th Battalion, Simcoe Foresters, began recruiting in late 1915 in Simcoe County. 2,450 volunteers were recruited, of which 1,070 officers and other ranks were enlisted in the battalion. Of the remainder, about 700 were rejected as being medically unfit, 75 were transferred to the 76th Battalion, and the approximately 600 remaining were transferred to the 177th Battalion (Simcoe Foresters), CEF.

Under the command of Lieutenant-Colonel D.H. MacLaren, the 157th was tasked with constructing a new army training camp on the Simcoe Pines Plain, which was to be named Camp Borden. Construction began in May 1916 with the companies from Barrie and Collingwood. A second company from Barrie arrived in June to help speed up the construction. As such, the 157th became the founding battalion of Camp Borden, which it constructed to accommodate 40 infantry battalions in 10 brigades. Before the camp was opened the remainder of the 157th and the entire 177th Battalion (Simcoe Foresters), CEF, under the command of Lieutenant-Colonel J.B. McPhee, arrived. By that summer, Camp Borden was home to 36 CEF battalions in nine brigades before they embarked overseas. On the night of Camp Borden's official opening, a riot by members of other battalions was suppressed by both the 157th and 177th battalions of the Simcoe Foresters, which were turned out with bayonets fixed.

On 12 October 1916, the battalion received its regimental colours at Camp Borden, which were subsequently laid up in St. Andrew's Presbyterian Church, Barrie, Ontario, after the war on 10 October 1919. The colours were reclaimed by The Grey and Simcoe Foresters, which perpetuates the 157th, on 18 June 1982 and deposited in the regiment's Barrie Officers' Mess.

Training at Camp Borden ended on 13 October 1916, when the 157th Battalion departed for Halifax, Nova Scotia. Embarking on board the SS Cameronian on 18 October 1916, the battalion sailed for Liverpool, England, arriving on 28 October. From Liverpool, the 157th was stationed for only a week at Witley Camp before proceeding to Bramshott Camp as part of the 7th Training Brigade.

Like so many CEF battalions arriving in England at that time, the 157th Battalion, Simcoe Foresters was broken up for reinforcements to units already in the field. Immediately a draft of 150 men was sent to the 1st, followed by a further 50 men to the 19th, on 5 December 1916. Three days later, a further 400 men were sent to join the 116th, which was in theatre in France. The balance of the 157th Battalion went to the 125th and the 8th Reserve Battalion. Before being transferred to other units, the officers were sent to Crowborough for additional instructional training.

By war's end, these Foresters had fought in the following battles: Arras, 1917; Vimy Ridge, 9–14 April 1917; Arleux, 28–29 April 1917; Capture of Fresnoy, 3–4 May 1917; Affairs, South of Souchez River, 3–25 June 1917; Capture of Avion, 26–29 June 1917; Battle of Hill 70, 15–25 August 1917; Ypres, 1917; and Second Battle of Passchendaele, 26 October–10 November 1917.

Today, the volunteer Borden Pipes & Drums band wear the Hunting Stewart tartan in honour of the 157th Battalion, Simcoe Foresters, founding battalion of the base. In June 2015, a contingent of civilian donors from the Borden Legacy Project and military personnel from CFB Borden travelled to Vimy Ridge to patriate soil, which will be encapsulated into a new memorial at the base marking its centennial of service. During this Vimy pilgrimage, the graves and memorials for 13 members of the 157th Simcoe Foresters who lost their lives during the Battle of Vimy Ridge were visited.

During the First World War, the 157th Battalion, Simcoe Foresters suffered 133 killed-in-action or died-of-wounds. This was a huge sacrifice by the families of Simcoe County through just one of its CEF battalions. From the four CEF battalions perpetuated by The Grey and Simcoe Foresters (147th, 157th, 177th, and 248th) over 450 lost their lives during the First World War.

The battalion had one commanding officer: Lieutenant-Colonel D. H. MacLaren.

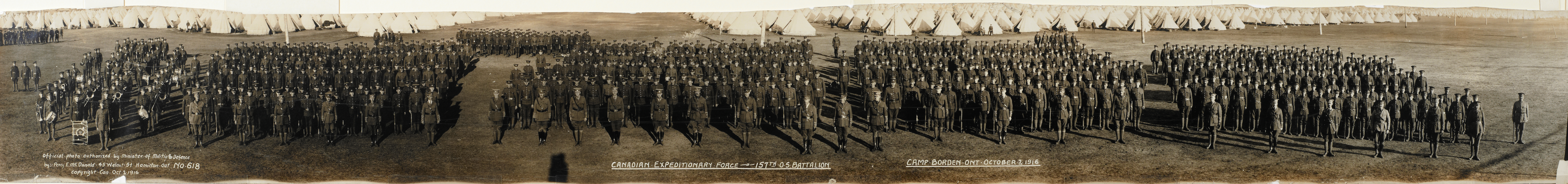
