= Jesuit Estates Act =

Statute of Quebec Canada

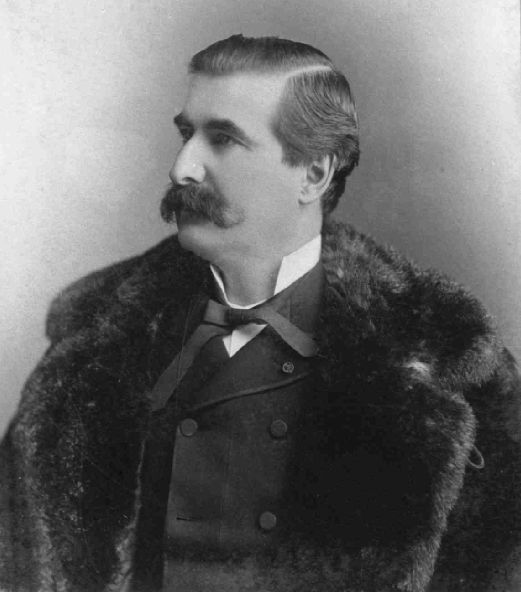
Honoré Mercier

The Jesuit Estates Act (French: Loi sur les biens des jésuites or Acte relatif au règlement de la question des biens des Jésuites) was an 1888 Act of the Legislative Assembly of Quebec that compensated the Society of Jesus for land confiscated in Canada by the British Crown after the suppression of the Society in 1774. When the revived Society returned to Canada in 1842, they began to campaign for the repossession of their allegedly confiscated estates. The premier of Quebec, Honoré Mercier, proposed the Jesuit Estates Act, which offered the Roman Catholic Church a financial settlement in return for incorporating the estates into Quebec's Crown lands. This measure provoked much controversy among Orangemen and Protestants, but it was not overturned.

== History ==
=== Settlement in Quebec ===
Following the Suppression of the Jesuits by Pope Clement XIV in 1773, their lands in the Province of Quebec were seized by the British Crown in 1791, but possession was not taken until 1800, after all of their priests had either died or left Canada. The lands were subsequently transferred to the Province of Lower Canada in 1831, and the Legislative Assembly of Lower Canada passed legislation in 1832 providing for all income arising from the estates to be segregated from other Crown property and dedicated for educational purposes. After the Order was restored by Pope Pius VII in 1814 by virtue of the papal bull Sollicitudo omnium ecclesiarum, it was re-established in Canada in the 1840s, and in the following years it campaigned for compensation in order to establish a new Catholic university in Montreal. The province's archbishop, Elzéar-Alexandre Taschereau, instead proposed that the estates be sold off and the money divided among existing Catholic schools.

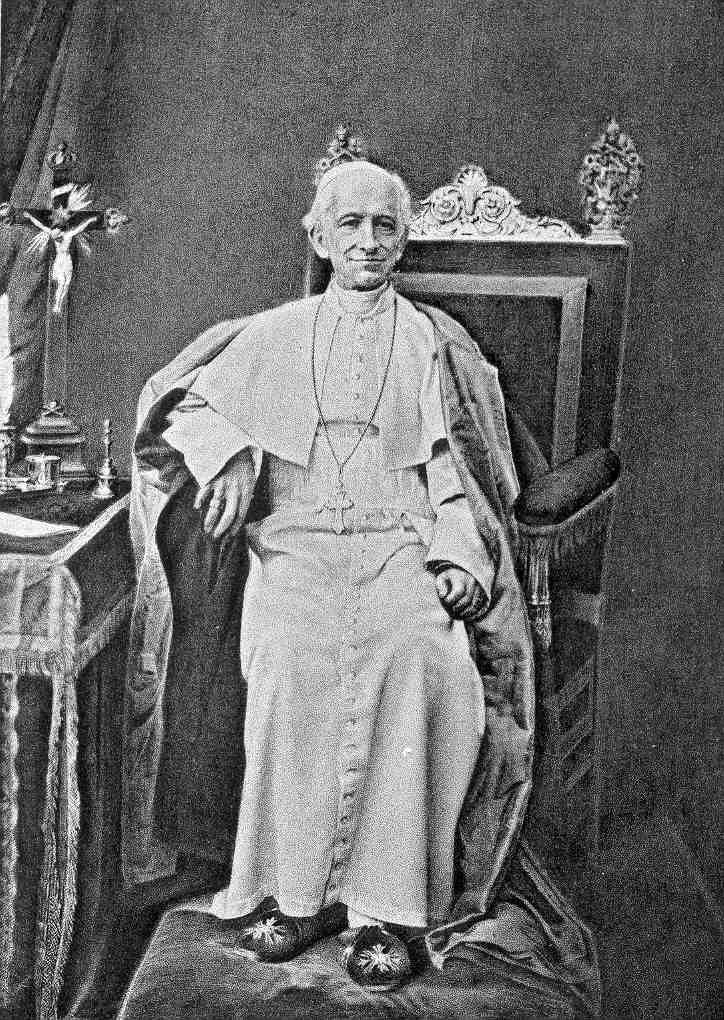
Pope Leo XIII

Through the mediation of Pope Leo XIII, a compromise was reached, and resulting Act in 1888 authorized a settlement which consisted of:

- a payment of CA$400,000 to be divided on the direction of the Pope (which went to the Jesuits, Laval University, and several Roman Catholic dioceses)
- the vesting of Laprairie Common in the Society, and
- a payment of CA$60,000 to the Protestant Committee of the Council of Public Instruction for appropriate investment by it.

=== Move for federal disallowance ===
In the House of Commons of Canada in February 1889, John Augustus Barron asked Minister of Justice John Thompson if the federal government would disallow the Quebec act. After Thompson replied that there was no intention, William Edward O'Brien proposed a resolution the following month requesting such action. In the subsequent debate, tensions were escalated when Dalton McCarthy declared:

We must never forget—I am afraid that some of my friends from Quebec do sometimes forget—that this is a British country, that by the fortunes of war that event was decided and the greater half of North America passed under the British Crown.... ...and yet, Sir, here, 100 years afterwards, we find the Premier of the province of Quebec suing humbly to the Pope of Rome for liberty to sell the Jesuits' estates. Can humiliation go much further, if we are indeed a free people.

The Conservative government of John A. Macdonald, together with the Liberal Party under Wilfrid Laurier, united to defeat the motion. The latter exclaimed, "Sir, this is not a party question; it is at most a family quarrel; it is simply a domestic disturbance in the ranks of the Conservative party."

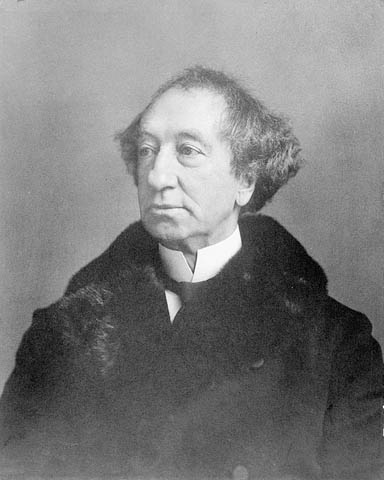
John A. Macdonald

In closing the debate, Macdonald declared:

...I am too well pleased and satisfied with the course taken by my hon. friend who has just spoken in support of the policy of the Government on this occasion to feel very indignant at the reproofs and reproaches thrown across the floor in the course of his speech. It is a bitter pill for my hon. friend to be obliged to vote for us. He is obliged to do it. He dare not do otherwise. He could not face Quebec if he did anything else....

He is a young man. I cannot say of him ... that he is a fledging politician, but he is a young man...

We know that public agitation may go on sometimes without reason, and to a great extent, one cannot but deeply regret that the hon. member for Muskoka felt it his duty to make this motion, which ought not to have been made—this motion which will be the cause of a great deal of discomfort in Canada....

Why, there are in all the Dominion of Canada 71 Jesuits. Are they going to conquer the whole of Canada? Is Protestantism to be subdued? Is the Dominion to be seduced from its faith by 71 Jesuit priests? They are armed with a string of beads, a sash around their waists and a mass book or missal. What harm can they do?...

I cannot but remember the story of the Jew going into an eating house and being seduced by a slice of ham. When he came out, it so happened there was a crash of thunder and he said: Good heaven, what a row about a little bit of pork. It is a little bit of pork, I have no doubt that Canada will escape from the enormous sum of $6,000 a year....

What would be the consequence of a disallowance? Agitation, a quarrel—a racial and a religious war would be aroused. The best interests of the country would be prejudiced, our credit would be ruined abroad, and our social relations destroyed at home. I cannot sufficiently picture, in my faint language, the misery and the wretchedness which would have been heaped upon Canada if this question, having been agitated as it has been, and would be, had culminated in a series of disallowances of this act.

By 188 to 13, the motion was defeated.

== Impact and aftermath ==
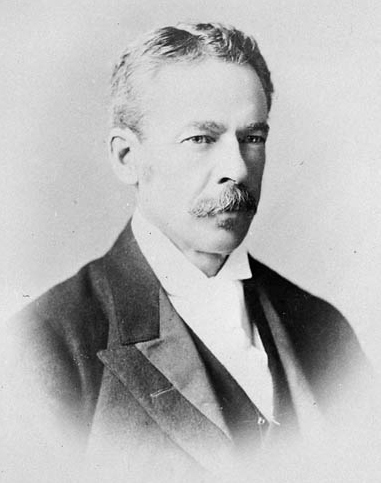
Dalton McCarthy

The thirteen MPs that supported the resolution came to be known as either the "Noble Thirteen" or the "Devil's Dozen", and McCarthy resigned from the Conservative Party. Their subsequent efforts led to the creation of the Equal Rights Association and the McCarthyites, as well as the rise of French-language schooling conflicts in Manitoba and Ontario.

In order to reduce political tensions, in 1890 the Parliament of Canada passed an Act for the incorporation of the Orange Order in Canada. This recognized the political influence that the Orangeman had attained, which greatly affected the outcome of the 1891 federal election.

The campaign for the Act's disallowance was one of many religious disputes that arose in 19th-Century and early 20th-Century Canada, which included the dissolution of the clergy reserves in Upper Canada, the Guibord case in the 1870s, the Manitoba Schools Question in the 1890s, and Ontario's Regulation 17 in 1912.
