= Simcoe (Province of Canada electoral district) =

Province of Canada electoral district

Simcoe Canada West
Province of Canada electoral district

Defunct pre-Confederation electoral district
- Legislature: Legislative Assembly of the Province of Canada
- District created: 1841
- District abolished: 1853
- First contested: 1841
- Last contested: 1851

Simcoe was an electoral district of the Legislative Assembly of the Parliament of the Province of Canada, in Canada West (now Ontario). It was created in 1841, upon the establishment of the Province of Canada by the union of Upper Canada and Lower Canada. Simcoe was represented by one member in the Legislative Assembly. It was abolished in the redistribution of 1853, when it was split into Simcoe North and Simcoe South.

== Boundaries ==
Simcoe electoral district was based on Simcoe County, in the central portion of what is now southern Ontario.

The Union Act, 1840 had merged the two provinces of Upper Canada and Lower Canada into the Province of Canada, with a single Parliament. The separate parliaments of Lower Canada and Upper Canada were abolished. The Union Act provided that the pre-existing electoral boundaries of Upper Canada would continue to be used in the new Parliament, unless altered by the Union Act itself.

Simcoe County had been an electoral district in the Legislative Assembly of Upper Canada, and its boundaries were not altered by the Union Act. Those boundaries had originally been set by a statute of Upper Canada in 1798:

That Matchedash, Gloucester, or Penetangueshine, together with Prince William Henry's Island, and all the land lying between the Midland District and a line produced due north from a certain fixed boundary (at the distance of about fifty miles north-west from the outlet of Burlington Bay) till it intersects the northern limits of the province, do constitute and form the County of Simcoe.

In 1837, the Legislature further defined the boundaries of Simcoe County as follows:

That the County of Simcoe, from and after the issuing of the said Proclamation, shall consist of the Townships of West Gwillimbury, Tecumseth, Adjala, Mono, Mulmer, Tosorontio, Essa, Innisfil, Nottawasaga, Sunnidale, Vespra, Oro, Orillia, (North and South division,) Medonte, Flos, Tiny, Tay and Matchedash, together with the Islands in Lakes Huron and Simcoe lying wholly or in greater part opposite thereto...

Since Simcoe was not changed by the Union Act, those boundaries continued to be used for the new electoral district. Simcoe was represented by one member in the Legislative Assembly.

== Members of the Legislative Assembly ==
Simcoe was represented by one member in the Legislative Assembly. The following were the members for Simcoe.

Parliament	Years	Members	Party
1st Parliament; 1841–1844	1841–1844	Elmes Yelverton Steele	Unionist; moderate Reformer

== Abolition ==
Simcoe electoral district was abolished in the re-distribution of 1853, when it was split into Simcoe North and Simcoe South.
