= Sam Steele =

Canadian soldier and police official

Major-general Sir Samuel Steele KCMG CB MVO
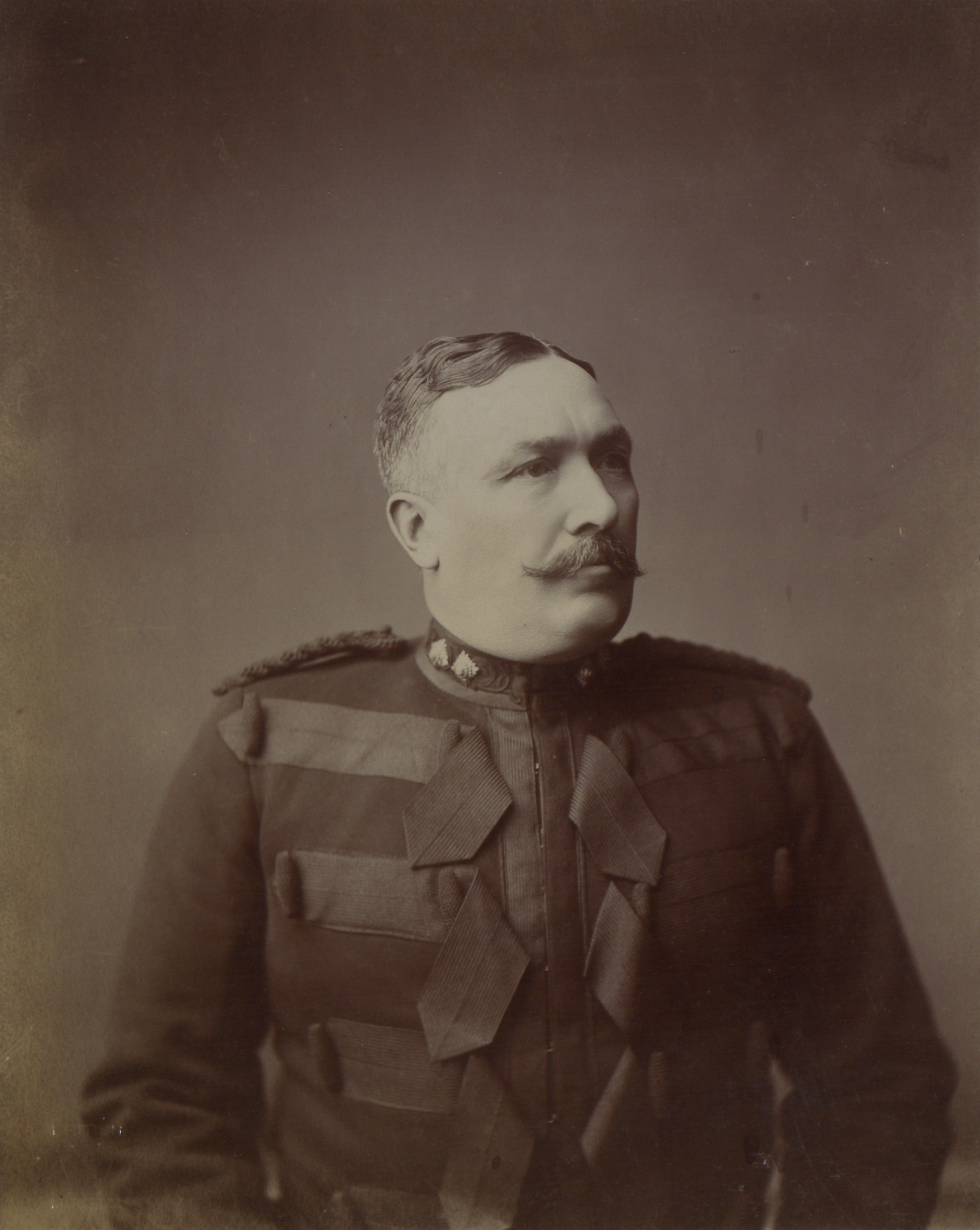
- Col Steele commanding Strathcona's Horse
- Born: Samuel Benfield Steele; 5 January 1848; Medonte Township, Province of Canada
- Died: 30 January 1919 (aged 71); Putney, London, United Kingdom
- Education: Royal Military College of Canada
- Occupations: Soldier police officer
- Known for: First commanding officer of Strathcona's Horse head of the Yukon detachment of the North-West Mounted Police during the Klondike Gold Rush
- Father: Elmes Yelverton Steele
- Military Service
- Allegiance: Canada
- Branch: Canadian Army
- Service years: 1866-1918
- Rank: Lieutenant-Colonel
- Units: 35th Simcoe Infantry; 31st Grey Infantry; North-West Mounted Police; Lord Strathcona's Horse; South African Constabulary
- Conflicts: Fenian Raids; Red River Expedition; North-West Rebellion; Battle of Frenchman's Butte; Battle of Loon Lake; Yukon Field Force; Second Boer War; Battle of Wolve Spruit; First World War

Major-general Sir Samuel Benfield Steele KCMG CB MVO (5 January 1848 – 30 January 1919) was a Canadian soldier and policeman. He was an officer of the North-West Mounted Police, head of the Yukon detachment during the Klondike Gold Rush, and commanding officer of Strathcona's Horse during the Boer War.

== Early life ==
Born into a military family at Medonte Township, Province of Canada (now Ontario), he was the son of Royal Navy Captain Elmes Yelverton Steele, a veteran of the Napoleonic Wars, and one of six brothers to have served in the British Armed Forces. His mother (his father's second wife), Anne Macdonald, was the youngest daughter of Neil Maclain MacDonald of Ardnamurchan, a native of Islay. Neil MacDonald was a grandson of Captain Godfrey MacNeil of Barra, and a nephew of Colonel Donald MacNeil. Steele was named for his father's uncle, Colonel Samuel Steele, who served in Quebec under Lord Amherst. Steele received his education at the family home, Purbrook, and then at the Royal Military College of Canada. By the age of 13 he was orphaned, and went to live with his elder half-brother, John Steele.

== Early military ==
Following his family's military tradition, in 1866 Steele joined the Canadian Militia during the Fenian raids, first joining the 35th Simcoe Battalion of Infantry and after moving to Clarksburg (near Collingwood) was commissioned as an officer in the 31st Grey Battalion of Infantry. Steele also participated in the Red River Expedition in 1870 to fight the Red River Rebellion of Louis Riel. Much to his disappointment, he arrived after the Métis had surrendered. The following year he joined the Permanent Force artillery, Canada's first regular army unit. Steele had long been fascinated by the West, devouring the works of James Fenimore Cooper in his youth. He was especially interested in the First Nations, and spent his time in the West learning from them and the Métis. However, he was assigned to Fort Henry in Kingston, Ontario, for the next few years, as an instructor at the Artillery School. In 1874, Steele was initiated as a Freemason in the Lisgar Lodge No. 2, in Selkirk, Manitoba.

== Life as Mountie ==
In 1873, Steele was the third officer sworn into the newly formed North-West Mounted Police (NWMP), entering as a staff constable. He was one of the officers to lead the new recruits of the NWMP on the 1874 March West, when he returned to Fort Garry, present-day Winnipeg, Manitoba. To him fell the rank of staff sergeant major and the responsibility, as an accomplished horseman and man-at-arms, of drilling the new recruits. In 1878, Steele was given his own command at Fort Qu'Appelle, North-West Territories.

In 1877, he was assigned to meet with Sitting Bull, who, having defeated Lieutenant Colonel George Armstrong Custer at the Little Bighorn, had moved with his people into Canada to escape American vengeance. Steele along with U.S. Army Major General Alfred Howe Terry attempted to persuade Sitting Bull to return to the United States. (Most of the Sioux returned a few years later.)

During the North-West Rebellion, Steele was dispatched with a small force. Missing the Battle of Batoche, the Mounties were sent to move against the last resistance force led by Big Bear. He was present at the Battle of Frenchman's Butte, where Big Bear's warriors defeated the Canadian forces under General Thomas Bland Strange. Two weeks later, Steele and his two dozen Mounties defeated Big Bear's force at Loon Lake, District of Saskatchewan, in the last battle fought on Canadian territory. The contributions of the NWMP in putting down the rebellion went largely ignored and unrewarded, to Steele's great annoyance. By 1885, Steele was recalled to Calgary, where he was tasked with organizing and commanding the scouting contingent for Major General T.B. Strange’s Alberta Field Force. Steele’s Scouts performed well, which led to his promotion to superintendent after the rebellion. He established an NWMP station in the town of Galbraiths Ferry, which was later named to Fort Steele in British Columbia, after Steele solved a murder in the town. He then moved on to Fort Macleod, District of Alberta, in 1888.

In 1887, Steele was ordered to take “D” Division to southeastern British Columbia, where the provincial government had mismanaged relations with the Ktunaxa (Kootenay) nation to the point that violence was threatened. Steele’s men built Fort Steele on the Kootenay River, and he resolved the situation through patient diplomacy with Chief Isadore. The division returned to Fort Macleod in the summer of 1888, and Steele commanded that post, the largest outside NWMP headquarters in Regina, for the next decade.

In 1889, at Fort Macleod, he met Marie-Elizabeth de Lotbinière-Harwood (1859–1951), daughter of Robert William Harwood. They were married at Vaudreuil, Quebec, in 1890. They had three children, including Harwood Steele, who fictionalized episodes from his father's life in novels such as Spirit-of-Iron (1929).

The discovery of gold in the Klondike in the late 1890s presented Steele with a new challenge. Although he campaigned unsuccessfully for the position of assistant commissioner in 1892, in January 1898, he was sent to succeed Charles Constantine as commissioner and to establish customs posts at the head of the White and Chilkoot Passes, and at Lake Bennett. He was noted for his hard line with the hundreds of unruly and independent-minded prospectors, many of them American. To help control the situation, he established the rule that no one would be allowed to enter the Yukon without a ton of goods to support himself, thus preventing the entry of desperate and potentially-unruly speculators and adventurers.

Steele and his force made the Klondike Gold Rush one of the most orderly of its kind in history and made the NWMP famous around the world, which ensured its survival at a critical time, as the force's dissolution was being debated in Parliament. By July 1898, Steele commanded all the NWMP in the Yukon area, and was a member of the territorial council. As the force reported directly to Ottawa, Steele had almost free rein to run things as he chose, always with an eye towards maintaining law, order, and Canadian sovereignty. He moved to Dawson City in September 1898.

== Boer War and second military career ==
Always a soldier, in early 1900, Steele leapt at the offer of Canadian Pacific Railway tycoon Donald Smith, Baron Strathcona, to be the first commanding officer of Smith's privately-raised cavalry unit, Strathcona's Horse (predecessor of the modern armoured unit, Lord Strathcona's Horse (Royal Canadians)), with the appointment as lieutenant-colonel from 7 March 1900. This Canadian light cavalry unit, in British Imperial service, was sent to South Africa during the Second Boer War, where Steele commanded them with distinction in the role of reconnaissance scouts. Steele, however, apparently disliked greatly what he was ordered to do by the British, which included burning towns, farms and homesteads, killing livestock of the Boer families and moving the populace to concentration camps. After the war, the regiment arrived in London in February 1901. Here they met Lord Strathcona for the first time and were presented with medals by King Edward VII during a visit to Buckingham Palace. Steele was also appointed a Member of the Royal Victorian Order (fourth class) (MVO), a personal gift from the King. On its return to Canada the regiment was disbanded, and the officers received honorary promotions. Steele was promoted to honorary lieutenant colonel in March 1901.

After taking the unit back to Canada early in 1901, Steele returned to South Africa that same year to command 'B' Division of the South African Constabulary, a position he held until 1906. On his return to Canada in 1907, Steele assumed command of Military Division No. 13 in Alberta and the District of Mackenzie, and then in 1910 assumed command of Division No. 10 at Winnipeg, where he spent his time regrouping Lord Strathcona's Horse and in preparing his memoirs.

Steele requested active military duty upon the outbreak of the First World War in August 1914. He was initially rejected for command on the grounds of age. However, a compromise was reached which allowed him to act as commander of the 2nd Canadian Division until the formation was sent to France, whereupon he would be replaced. After accompanying the division to England, Steele was offered an administrative post as commanding officer of the South-East District.

Matters were complicated, however, when Canadian Minister of Defence Sam Hughes insisted that Steele also be made commander of all Canadian troops in Europe, a slight problem, as there were two brigadier-generals who each believed the Canadian command was his. The issue was not resolved until 1916, when the new Minister of Overseas Military Forces of Canada, Sir G. H. Perley, removed Steele from his Canadian command after Steele refused to return to Canada as a recruiter. He kept his British command until his retirement on 15 July 1918. While in Britain, Steele was knighted, on 1 January 1918, and was made a Companion of the Most Honourable Order of the Bath, and Knight Commander of the Most Distinguished Order of St. Michael and St. George.

== Death and legacy ==
Steele died during the 1918 flu pandemic just after his 71st birthday. He was interred at the Cathedral of St. John Cemetery in Winnipeg.

Canada's fifth-tallest mountain, Mount Steele, is named after him.

CFB Edmonton, the home of Lord Strathcona's Horse (Royal Canadians), is now called Steele Barracks after Major General Steele.

Steele Narrows at Loon Lake was the site of the Battle of Loon Lake, the last battle in the North-West Rebellion. Steele's Alberta scouts fought there.

In 1979 Scarborough School Board, now Toronto District School Board named a grade school after him, Sir Samuel B Steele Junior Public School.

== Personal papers ==
On 19 June 2008, Steele's wealth of personal papers and writings were repatriated to Canada in a ceremony in Trafalgar Square in London, England, headed by the Prince Edward, Earl of Wessex. Steele's papers, believed by historians to contain a wealth of heretofore untold stories that would "re-write Canadian history" had been held by British descendants of Steele, and were returned via a $1.8 million purchase by the University of Alberta.

In 2020, the Orillia Museum of Art and History put on an exhibit of some of Steele’s correspondence with Thomas Blaney of Orillia, who helped Steele look after his family affairs while Steele was out of the country.

Military offices
Preceded by New post	GOC 2nd Canadian Infantry Division; May–August 1915	Succeeded by Richard Turner
