= 147th (Grey) Battalion, CEF =

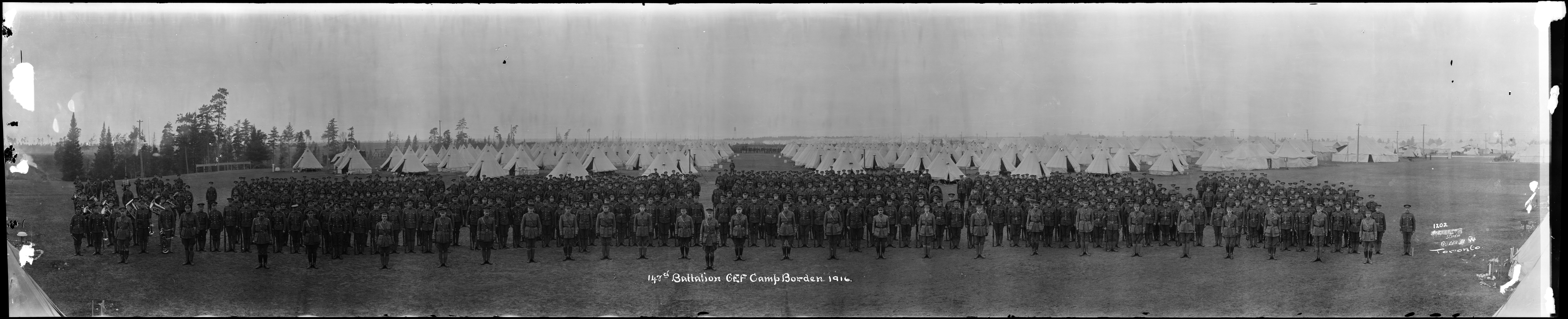
Canadian 147th Battalion during the First World War

The 147th (Grey) Battalion, CEF was a unit in the Canadian Expeditionary Force during the First World War, raised by the 31st Grey Regiment.

== History ==
Based in Owen Sound, Ontario, the unit began recruiting in late 1915 in Grey County. It departed to Camp Niagara on 19 May 1916 under the command of Lieutenant-Colonel G.F. MacFarland, where it trained until 4 July when it moved to the brand new Camp Borden. The 147th left Camp Borden on 5 October for embarkation overseas, sailing on the sister ship to RMS Titanic, RMS Olympic, arriving at Liverpool, England on 20 November. After sailing to England in November 1916, the battalion was absorbed into the 8th Reserve Battalion on 1 January 1917. The 147th (Grey) Battalion, CEF had one Officer Commanding: Lieut-Col. G. F. McFarland.

The 147th received its Regimental colours on 22 August 1916 at Camp Borden, which were subsequently laid-up for safe keeping in St. Nicholas Cathedral, Newcastle upon Tyne, England, on 26 May 1917. They were reclaimed on 3 March 1919 and returned to Canada where they were deposited in the Owen Sound Public Library on 16 September. Eventually, they were encased in the Owen Sound Officers' Mess. In a rather unorthodox approach, a duplicate stand of 147th Colours was produced in 1948 by the Grey Council and deposited in the old County Courthouse by the Association on 13 April 1949.

The 147th's Private Thomas William Holmes of Owen Sound won the Victoria Cross at the Battle of Passchendaele on 26 October 1917, while serving with the 4th Canadian Mounted Rifles. Tommy Holmes became Canada's youngest winner of the VC and the Owen Sound Armoury is named in his memory. Each year on Remembrance Day, a firing party from The Grey and Simcoe Foresters, which perpetuates the 147th, fires a volley over his grave at Greenwood Cemetery, Owen Sound. Two other VC winners are also buried at Greenwood Cemetery, Air Marshal Billy Bishop and Major David Vivian Currie.
