= William Edward O'Brien =

Canadian politician

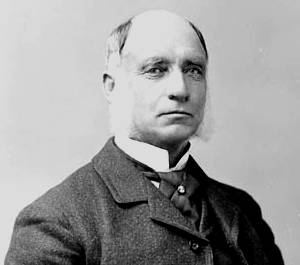
William Edward O'Brien Source: Library and Archives Canada

William Edward O'Brien (10 March 1831 – 21 December 1914) was a lawyer, farmer, militia officer, editor and political figure in Ontario, Canada. He represented Muskoka and Parry Sound in the House of Commons of Canada from 1882 to 1896 as a Conservative member.

== Biography ==
He was born in Thornhill, Upper Canada, the son of Edward G. O'Brien, an immigrant from Ireland, and was educated at Upper Canada College. In 1864, he married Elizabeth Loring, a descendant of United Empire Loyalist Joshua Loring. He was called to the Ontario bar in 1874. O'Brien was an unsuccessful candidate for a seat in the House of Commons in 1878. An officer in the Canadian Militia, O'Brien was the lieutenant-colonel of the 35th Simcoe Foresters and would command the York and Simcoe Provisional Battalion during the North-West Rebellion of 1885. In 1889, O'Brien introduced a motion in the House of Commons that the Jesuit Estates Act, which had been passed by the Quebec assembly, be struck down by the federal parliament; that motion was defeated. He was defeated when he ran for reelection in 1896.
