= Leith, Ontario =

Leith
- Unincorporated community
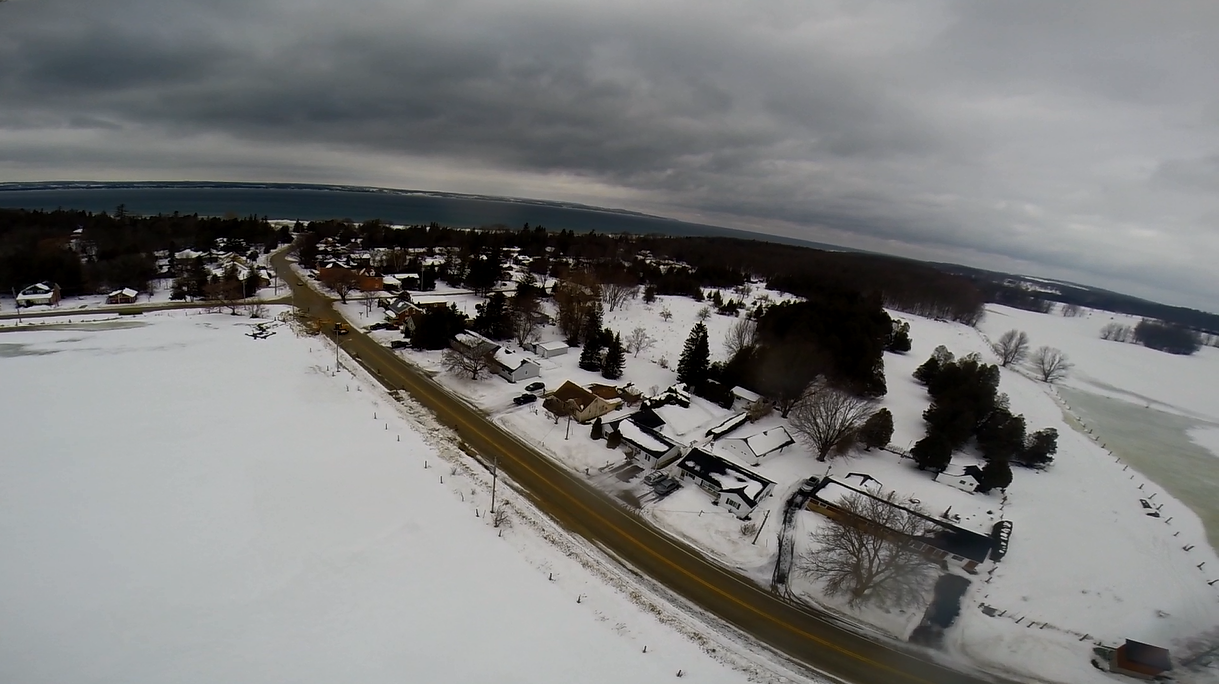
- Interactive map of Leith
- Coordinates: 44°37′31″N 80°52′35″W
- Country: Canada
- Province: Ontario
- County: Grey County
- Municipality: Meaford

Leith is an unincorporated community in Ontario, Canada, named after Leith, Scotland. It is located on the eastern shore of the Owen Sound Bay, an inlet (sound) on the south shore of Georgian Bay on Lake Huron. Owen Sound Bay is a broad valley that cuts through the Niagara Escarpment. The valley preceded the last great Ice Age, but was broadened by the action of the glacial ice, then by the erosive forces of the Sydenham and Pottowatomi rivers. During his preliminary survey of Lake Huron in 1815, Captain William Fitzwilliam Owen named it "Owen's Sound" for his brother, Admiral Sir Edward William Campbell Rich Owen.

Located approximately 9 kilometres northeast of the city of Owen Sound in the municipality of Meaford, Leith was established in the mid-1800s on Bothwells Creek where it empties into the Sound. John Telfer, who was appointed the Crown Land Agent for this area in 1840, bought and moved to Leith in 1846 when the settling of the community began. Leith was twice more sold, from Telfer to James Wilson of Galt in 1854, and from Wilson to Adam Ainslie in 1857. Leith is flanked by the larger Hibou Conservation Area to the west, and by the smaller Ainslie Wood Conservation area to the northeast Grey-Sauble Conservation Authority. Hibou boasts two natural sandy beaches, and 2.5 kilometres of nature trails across from the water. There are also many trails from the road to the water's edge, all in close proximity to Leith. A plan to incorporate Leith was created in the 19th century but was never executed. Today Leith is a quiet hamlet with many year-round residents and some summer cottagers. Leith residents enjoy easy access to the waters of Georgian Bay.

When the wind blows from the northeast, the sound of the waves crashing along the shoreline is audible throughout the hamlet. At one time a pier capable of serving sailing ships and schooners existed on the northeast side of the mouth of Bothwells Creek. "Ainslie Wharf" was Adam Ainslie's grand enterprise to make Leith a major Great Lakes port. Built in 1861 of cribbed stone and oak posts, the dock was further extended in 1870 to accommodate bigger ships. Grain and cattle, hogs and sheep, cords of maple beech and elm were shipped from this magnificent dock. However, exposure to the open Georgian Bay to the north-northeast eventually caused the destruction of the pier. November storms, winter ice and two ship disasters at the dock weakened it, eventually making it a dangerous structure which the townsfolk tore down after Ainslie's death. All that remains in the water are a collection of old wooden pilings, serving principally as perches for waterfowl and an obstacle to pleasure boaters. A superior harbour in the city of Owen Sound, at the end of the inlet, eventually led to the demise of Leith as a commercial port. There is a small public gravel beach in Leith and public access to small craft boating from Telfer Creek. The mouth of Bothwells Creek is now protected habitat for large schools of baby trout.

Leith is renowned for the beauty of its landscape, both at the water's edge, and in the surrounding countryside. The old Leith Church is the site of the grave of Tom Thomson, a noted Canadian landscape painter who died in mysterious circumstances at Canoe Lake in Algonquin Park in 1917. Thomson was a friend of the Group of Seven, famous landscape painters many of whose works are on permanent display at the McMichael Canadian Art Collection in Kleinburg, Ontario. He grew up in Leith. Leith was also the favourite summer place for artist Carl Ahrens (1862-1936), one of Canada's foremost landscape painters, whose works can still be viewed at the National Art Gallery in Ottawa, and other galleries throughout Canada and Britain.

In the late 1850s and early 1860s there was a grist mill and a flour mill, an oatmeal mill at Keefer's Creek, a tannery, three stores, a distillery, a dock and several store houses, a church and cemetery, several frame houses, a hotel and stables, a tavern, and both picnic and cricket grounds, as well as a boot and shoe maker, blacksmith, four carpenters and shingle makers, a teacher and a postmaster. Mail began to arrive in Leith in 1853, and was delivered from Sydenham (Owen Sound) post office by steamboat bi-weekly to Ainslie Wharf. By 2004 only one of the stores remained and the post office had closed. Until 2013 the Bays River Restaurant operated in the building which was once the golf course club house and dance hall. On a clear day the view from the restaurant across the mouth of the Owen Sound inlet is spectacular. The scenic Bayshore Road cuts through the hamlet of Leith and continues along the shoreline for many miles, serving various small laneways for cottagers and shoreline residences.

Leith is well known for sport fishing. In 1921 sea lamprey or lamprey eel (Petromyzon marinus) invaded the Great Lakes through the Welland Canal, though, significantly reducing the numbers of lake trout and whitefish. While the lake trout have largely vanished from Lake Huron, rainbow trout and salmon still exist in the lake. Since 1988 a species native to Asia, zebra mussels (Dreissena polymorpha), have invaded the Great Lakes, and the Owen Sound area has not been spared. Swimmers at Leith have received cuts to their bare feet from the very sharp shells of these little molluscs. In the 1990s the Great Lakes were again invaded by the round goby, a small bottom-dwelling fish, which feasts on zebra mussels along with fish eggs and native baby trout. Round gobies can often be observed feeding in the shallow waters at the bridge over Bothwells Creek in Leith. The zebra mussel population has been kept at bay.

An area on the Georgian Bay water between Owen Sound and Leith, simply marked with a green buoy, is known by local salmon and trout anglers as "Thomson's Hole". The fishing hole has garnered some of the area's best fishing and is a popular fishing stop during the Owen Sound Salmon Spectacular Derby. The fishing hole is known for its extreme depth and its plentiful fishing but is also a popular sailing area.

In 1997, a stained glass window designed by Ellen Simon entitled "Nativity Scene" circa 1954 in the United Church in Leith was illustrated on the U.S.-rate Canada Postage stamp in the Christmas series. The window remains in the Leith Church today and is viewable when the church is open.

The old Leith Church closed in 1969, as did the old Leith Golf Course in the 1970s. The Leith congregation now worships at the United Church just up the hill in Annan. The Leith church building fell into disrepair for a number of years. However, since 1992 the church and nearby cemetery have been declared a designated heritage site under the Ontario Heritage Act. The church has been refurbished and is now maintained by a vigorous, energetic and strong community of volunteers known as the "Friends of Leith Church" [FOLC]. The church is occasionally opened for special events and regular fundraising continues to maintain the building. Due to the excellent acoustics, the church building is regularly used for musical concerts during the spring, summer and fall period (Leith Summer Festival). It has a seating capacity of 180 and is particularly renowned for chamber music ensembles.
