= 248th Battalion, CEF =

The 248th Battalion, CEF was a unit in the Canadian Expeditionary Force during the First World War. Based in Owen Sound, Ontario, the unit began recruiting in the late summer of 1916 in Grey County. After sailing to England in June 1917, the battalion was absorbed into the 7th and 8th Reserve Battalions later that month. The 248th Battalion, CEF had one Officer Commanding: Lieut-Col. Joseph Hilliard Rorke.

The battalion is perpetuated by The Grey and Simcoe Foresters.
