= 177th Battalion (Simcoe Foresters), CEF =

The 177th (Simcoe Foresters) Battalion, CEF was a unit in the Canadian Expeditionary Force raised during the First World War by the 35th Simcoe Foresters. Based in Barrie, Ontario and later at Camp Borden, the unit began recruiting during the winter of 1915/16 in Simcoe County, Ontario. The battalion arrived at Camp Borden on 3 July 1916 where it trained until sailing to England in May 1917. The battalion was absorbed into the 3rd Reserve Battalion on May 14, 1917. The 177th (Simcoe Foresters) Battalion, CEF had one Officer Commanding: Lieut-Col. J. B. McPhee, and is perpetuated by The Grey and Simcoe Foresters.
