= Billy Bishop =

Canadian aviator and author (1894–1956)

Air Marshal William Bishop VC CB DSO & Bar MC DFC ED
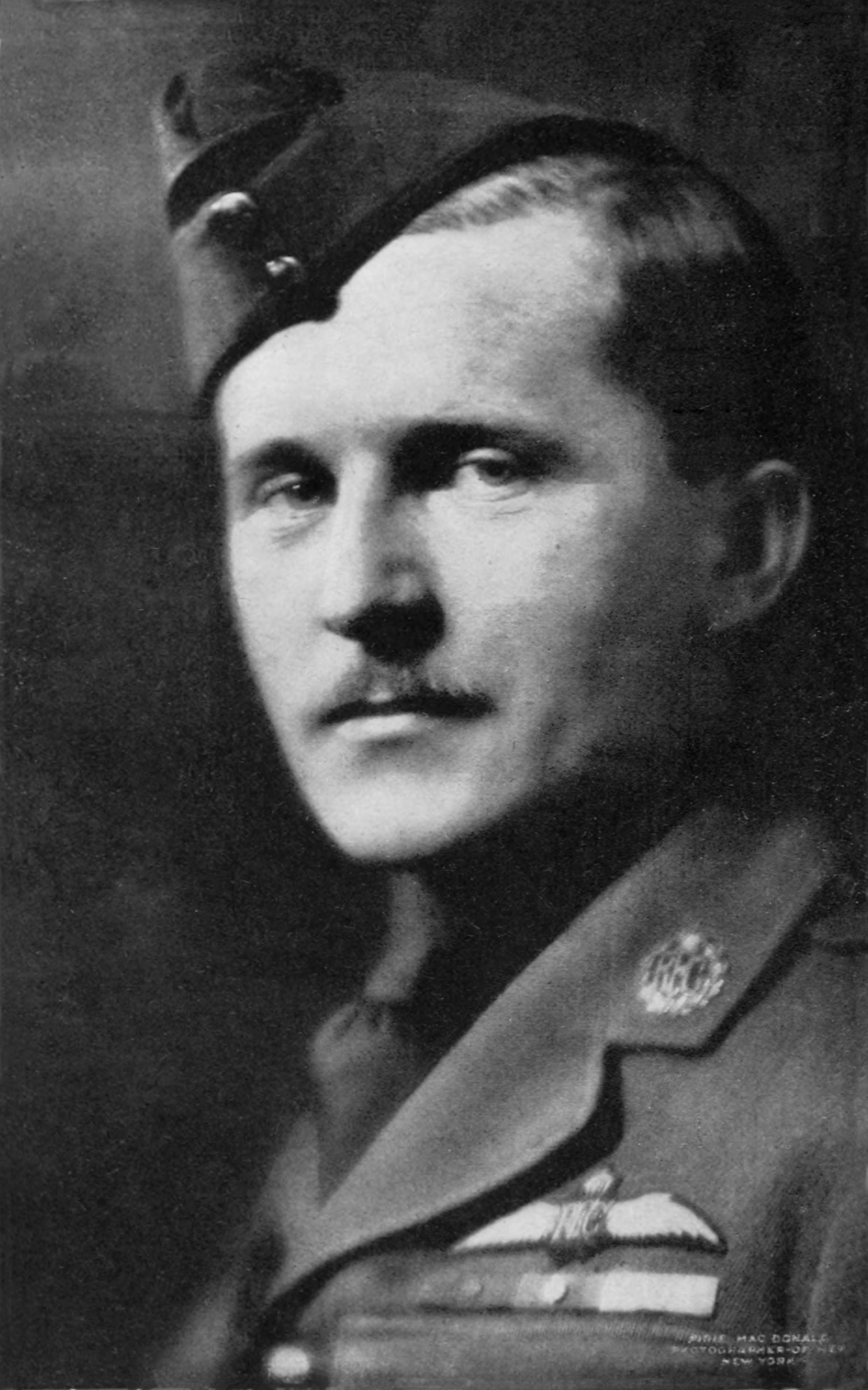
- Lieutenant Billy Bishop c.1918
- Born: 8 February 1894; Owen Sound, Ontario, Canada
- Died: 11 September 1956 (aged 62); West Palm Beach, Florida, United States
- Education: Royal Military College of Canada
- Military career
- Allegiance: Canada; United Kingdom
- Branch: Permanent Active Militia: Canadian Expeditionary Force; British Army: Royal Flying Corps; Royal Canadian Air Force
- Service years: 1914–1918; 1936–1944
- Rank: Air Marshal
- Nickname: "Bish"
- Commands: No. 60 Squadron RAF; No. 85 Squadron RAF
- Conflicts: First World War: Western Front; Battle of Arras; Battle of Vimy Ridge; Second World War
- Awards: Victoria Cross; Companion of the Order of the Bath; Distinguished Service Order & Bar; Military Cross; Distinguished Flying Cross; Mentioned in Despatches; Canadian Efficiency Decoration; Chevalier of the Legion of Honour (France); Croix de guerre (France)

Air Marshal William Avery "Billy" Bishop, Jr., VC, CB, DSO & Bar, MC, DFC, ED (8 February 1894 – 11 September 1956) was a Canadian flying ace of the First World War. He was officially credited with 72 victories, making him the top Canadian and British Empire ace of the war, and also received a Victoria Cross. During the Second World War, Bishop was instrumental in setting up and promoting the British Commonwealth Air Training Plan.

== Early life ==
William Avery Bishop (commonly called Billy Bishop to distinguish him from his father) was born in Owen Sound, Ontario, on 8 February 1894, blond, blue-eyed, and weighing 11 pounds. He was the third of four children born to William Avery Bishop Sr. and Margaret Louisa (Green) Bishop. William Avery Bishop Sr. was a lawyer and graduate of Osgoode Hall Law School in Toronto, Ontario. He was the Registrar of Grey County and was appointed to the post after backing the winning Liberal Party candidate in the national elections of 1896. He was consequential enough to be invited to a dinner for British dignitaries hosted by Prime Minister Sir Wilfrid Laurier.

His eldest brother Worth was ten years old when Billy arrived. His other brother, Kilbourn, was born in 1886, but died in 1893, the year before Billy's birth. Sister Louise, to whom Billy became very close, was born in 1895, a year after him.

== School days ==
Young Billy Bishop grew up in the inland port city of Owen Sound on Georgian Bay, touted to be "the next Liverpool". He was distinguished from the other children on several counts. He spoke with a slight lisp. Also, he was the only boy in town who attended classes at Miss Pearl's Dancing School with the local girls. Add to that, his mother sent him to school in suit and tie; his schoolboy classmates scorned his formal dress and damaged his garb. Then too, he did not care for team sports like lacrosse, football, and hockey, preferring solitary sports, such as riding, swimming, or billiards at the YMCA or local pool halls. Most especially, he became a marksman. His father gave him a .22 caliber rifle for Christmas, along with a promise of 25 cents for every squirrel that he shot. The family orchard, which had been overrun by a destructive plague of squirrels, was soon free of the beasts as the young sniper mastered the one-shot kill. Some sources insist that the young hunter learned the art of deflection shooting, the knack of leading a moving target, at this time.

Bishop attended Beech Street School (1045 3rd Ave West; Dufferin Public School in 1910, now closed and home to M'Wikwedong Indigenous Friendship Centre) near his home and later at Owen Sound Collegiate Institute (at the 3rd Avenue East site and later at the now closed Strathcona Senior Public School).

Bishop developed a reputation in his youth for defending himself and others against bullying, reportedly engaging in multiple schoolyard fights. Some accounts describe an incident in which he fought several opponents at once. He was also noted for his physical appearance, being described as slender, of average height, and conventionally attractive.

In the classroom, it was a different tale. Bishop was less successful at his studies; he would abandon any subject he could not easily master, and was often absent from class.

In 1910, at the age of 16, after reading a newspaper article, Bishop built a glider out of cardboard, wooden crates, bedsheets, and twine, and made an attempt to fly off the roof of his three-story house. He was dug, unharmed, out of the wreckage by his sister Louise. After she helped him hide the wreckage, she insisted he owed her a favor, and insisted he date her girlfriend Margaret Burden.

The granddaughter of Timothy Eaton, the department store magnate, Margaret Burden had become friends with Louise Bishop during summer vacations to Owen Sound. Once she met Billy, they were smitten with one another, which greatly annoyed her parents.

== College ==
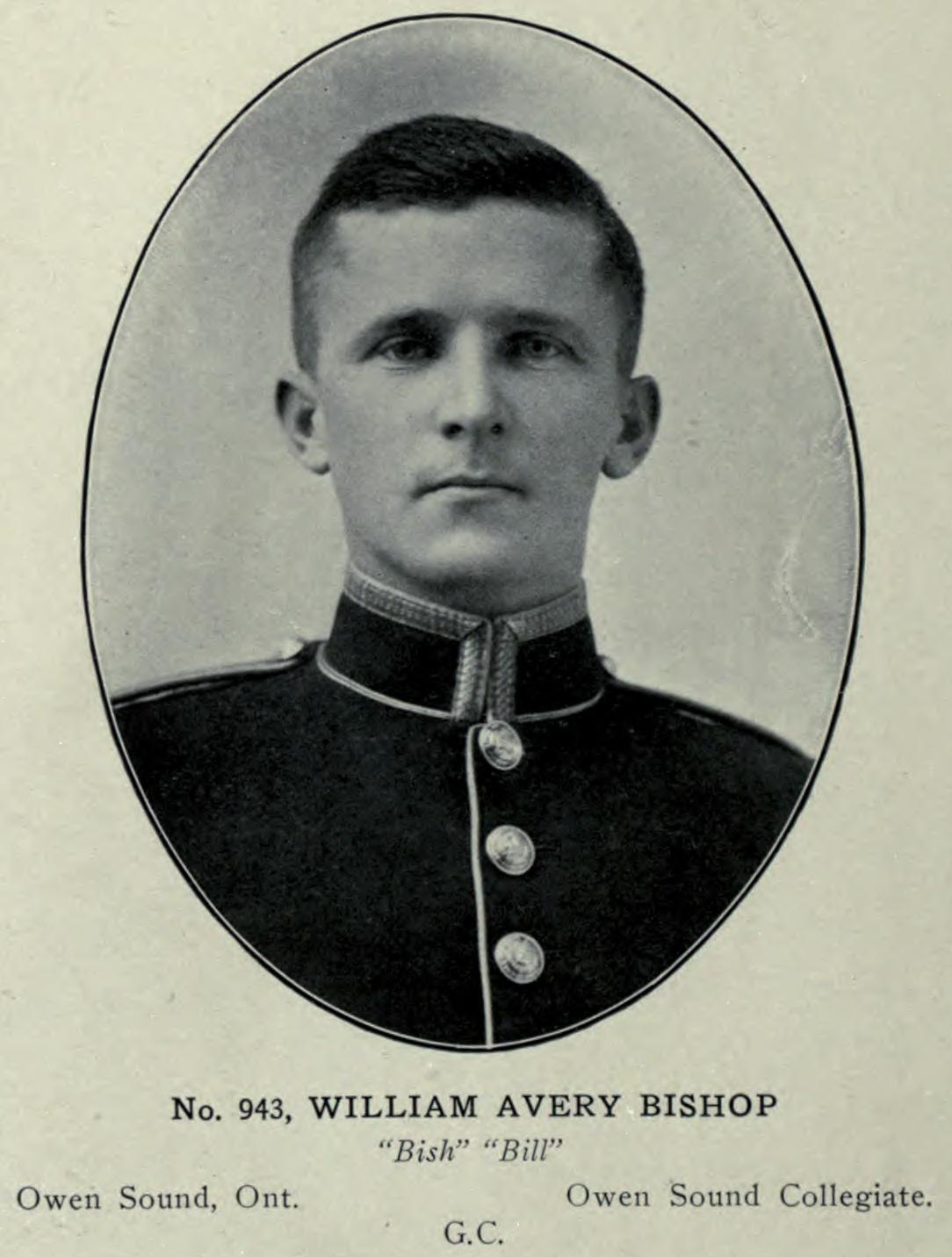
Cadet Bishop's yearbook photo at the Royal Military College of Canada, 1914.

On his 17th birthday, 8 February 1911, Billy Bishop applied to the Royal Military College of Canada (RMC) in Kingston, Ontario, where his brother Worth had graduated in 1903. Bishop placed 42nd of the 43 candidates admitted to the three-year school. He spent a hard first year during 1911 and 1912, struggling academically. He also suffered severe hazing from seniors; RMC regulations barred him from retaliatory fisticuffs. Then he was caught cheating on a year-end exam, and narrowly avoided expulsion. Too humiliated to return home for the summer, he stayed in Kingston and worked for Worth. Bishop was readmitted to the RMC as a second year student for the 1912–1913 term, though with an extra year's study added for him to graduate. That year, he raised his class standing to 23rd of 42 students.

During the 1913–1914 term, Bishop's class standing sagged to 33rd of 34. On 28 August 1914, he returned to RMC as a senior. After 15 of Bishop's classmates left school to serve as officers in the burgeoning war, Bishop withdrew from the RMC on 30 September 1914 with the same intention. That same day, he was commissioned into a cavalry unit, the Mississauga Horse. He journeyed to Toronto to inform Margaret Burden of his decision before reporting for duty.

== First World War ==
=== Mud and manure ===
When The Mississauga Horse shipped out for the war, Second Lieutenant Bishop was not with them; he was in hospital with pneumonia and allergies. After recovering, he was transferred to the 7th Canadian Mounted Rifles, a mounted infantry unit, then stationed in London, Ontario, in January 1915. Bishop was placed in charge of the regimental machine guns. Popular with the enlisted men, Bishop was nicknamed "Bish" and "Billy". He excelled on the firing range. As one of his subordinates remembered:

"Bish would just riddle a target that the rest of us could barely see. The instructors would keep putting it further back, until it was just a tiny black dot, and he'd shoot it to ribbons...he put every damn' bullet on target. He never missed."

Mishap continued to dog Bishop. On 6 April 1915, a horse he was riding reared and fell on him; he was back riding a week later. At the end of the month, the bolt of a rifle he was firing blew back and whacked him on the cheekbone. Then he became so ill from an inoculation that he fell off his horse. It was during this time that Bishop slipped away to Ontario, and proposed marriage to Margaret Burden. She accepted, and they were engaged. He gave her his RMC ring as a symbol of his troth.

Bishop's unit left Canada for England on 6 June 1915 on board the requisitioned cattle ship Caledonia as part of a convoy. The voyage through rough seas was poor on food. Most of the 240 men and 600 horses on board were seasick. From time to time, the ship's crew chucked dead horses overboard. On 21 June, near Ireland, U-boats attacked the convoy. Three ships were sunk and 300 Canadians killed, but Bishop's ship arrived unscathed in Plymouth harbour on 23 June.

The 7th Canadian Mounted Rifles were assigned to train at Shorncliffe Cavalry Camp in outmoded cavalry tactics. Living in tents, the Canadians suffered through sandstorms when it was dry; usually, though, they lived in a rainy swamp of mud and horse manure. Bishop spent more time in hospital in late July. Afterwards, during one especially mucky day, Bishop watched an aeroplane land in a nearby field. He remarked to his companion, "You don't get any mud or horseshit on you up there. If you died, it would be a clean death." Bishop decided to apply for a transfer.

=== Into the air ===
On a jaunt to London, Bishop subsequently wrangled an appointment with the Royal Flying Corps recruitment officer, Lord Hugh Cecil. When Bishop was told it would be a year before he could train as a pilot, he accepted the immediate chance to become an aerial observer. On 1 September, he reported to 21 (Training) Squadron at Netheravon in Wiltshire for elementary air instruction. The first aircraft he trained in was the Avro 504. Having taken a month for preliminary training, on 2 October 1915 Bishop transferred to gunnery training at Dover. By the end of October, Bishop was crossing the English Channel and flying his first missions in a combat zone, directing artillery fire. On 24 November, Bishop's pilot crashed their airplane upon landing back in England. Bishop suffered a bruised foot; the pilot was also only bruised. Three days later, Bishop took a check ride in a new aircraft. When he wrote home to Margaret describing this flight, he boasted of a 300 mph (400 km) dive in an aircraft that could not have exceeded half that. Such braggadocio characterized his correspondence with her.

No. 21 Squadron was re-equipped with new Royal Aircraft Factory RE.7s. On 15 January 1916, No. 21 Squadron began its transfer to France. By 23 January, as the squadron established itself at Boisdinghem, Bishop began a three-day illness. He emerged from hospital to join his squadron in adjusting to the realities of the infant military science of aerial warfare. Until this time, fliers on both sides of the conflict had been fumbling their way towards mounting firearms on aircraft. When Bishop emerged from hospital, there were already reports of German Fokker Eindecker monoplanes that could fire a machine gun through their propeller arc without striking a blade. Aim the aircraft; aim the gun. As the deadly little Fokkers slowly multiplied on the front, they became feared by the Royal Flying Corps as the Fokker Scourge. In response, the RFC quit single plane patrols, mandating two escorts for every reconnaissance aircraft. However, casualties were rare, and dismissed airily. One of Bishop's letters to his fiancée mentioned that the German fliers were chivalrous; the two sides exchanged dropped messages on the occasional casualty. Bishop wrote: "It is awfully nice to be on such good terms with one's enemies, and everyone here speaks very highly of all the German flyers. They seem to all be of a fine crowd."

Meanwhile, No. 21 Squadron RFC was discovering that their underpowered RE.7s could not take flight with a bomb load, and so failed as a bomber. The awkward crew positioning also hindered its fighting ability, with the observer in front with a non-synchronized Lewis gun hemmed in by struts and bracing wires. The pilot was seated behind him, back under the upper wing.

The rest of Bishop's time as an observer was a string of mishaps. Weather aloft was arctic bitter. A three and a half hour flight on 9 February 1916 frostbit his cheek so severely it burst open and put him back under medical care. In March, he was injured in a vehicle collision. Then he was hit in the head by an aircraft cable; he spent two days unconscious. This was followed by an abscessed tooth. Once returned to duty, he whacked a knee against an aircraft's frame when his pilot pulled a hard landing.

Bishop was then granted a three-week leave to England. As he strode down the gangplank at Folkestone on 2 May 1916, he stumbled and fell onto his sore knee. Three other soldiers behind him toppled over him to compound his injury. Resolved not to miss his holiday, Bishop limped through his leave. Just before he returned to France, he turned himself in to have his knee treated at the hospital at Bryanston Square. Once hospitalized, he was informed on 26 May that he would face a medical board to determine his further fitness for service. After Bishop awakened from a nap, he found a well-dressed elderly woman at his bedside. Lady St. Helier insisted she knew his father from a reception in Canada, and thus was a family friend. Lady St. Helier was widely known for both her wide circle of influential friends, and for her charitable tendencies. The latter attribute had brought her to the hospital. Now she used her influence to remove Bishop from hospital and install him as one of her guests in her four-story mansion, where he mingled with, and charmed, her influential social circle.

After Bishop faced a medical board, he was sent back to Canada to recuperate on home leave. In four months of aerial combat, he had not fired his machine gun at the enemy. However, he received local acclaim in Owen Sound for his service. Then too, the Burdens overcame their objections to Bishop's suit, and agreed to their daughter's official engagement. She was presented with an actual engagement ring.

=== Aerial combat ===
Bishop returned to England in September 1916, and, with the influence of St Helier, was accepted for training as a pilot at the Central Flying School at Upavon on Salisbury Plain. His first solo flight was in a Maurice Farman "Shorthorn".

In November 1916 after receiving his wings, Bishop was attached to No. 37 Squadron RFC at RFC Stow Maries, Essex, flying the BE.2c. He was officially appointed to flying officer duties on 8 December 1916. Bishop disliked flying at night over London, searching for German airships, and he soon requested a transfer to France.

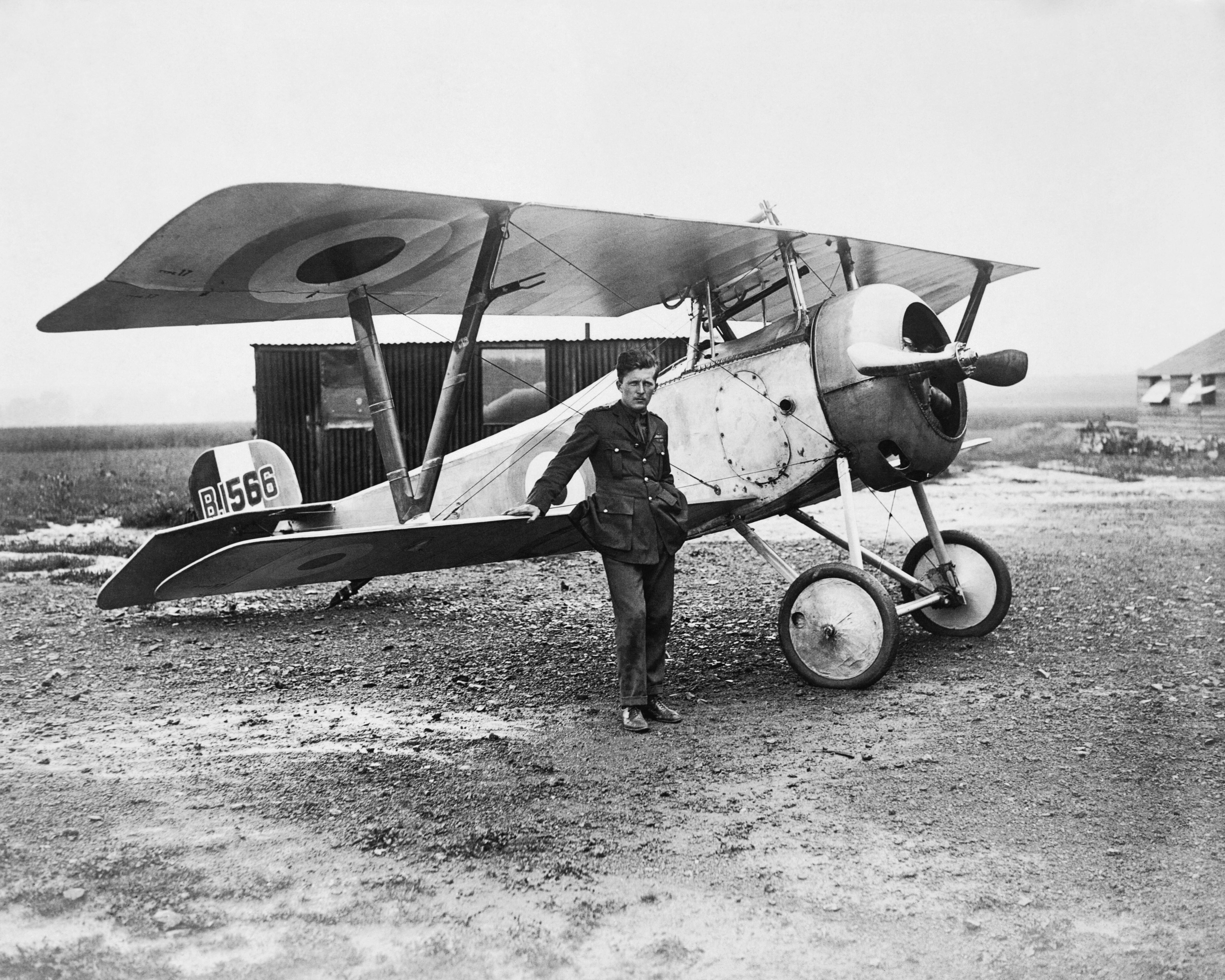
Bishop and a Nieuport 17 fighter in Filescamp, 1917.

On 17 March 1917, Bishop arrived at 60 Squadron at Filescamp Farm near Arras, where he flew the Nieuport 17 fighter. At that time, the average life expectancy of a new pilot in that sector was 11 days, and German aces were shooting down British aircraft 5 to 1. Bishop's first patrol on 22 March was less than successful. He had trouble controlling his run-down aircraft, was nearly shot down by anti-aircraft fire, and became separated from his group. On 24 March, after crash-landing his aircraft during a practice flight in front of General John Higgins, Bishop was ordered to return to flight school at Upavon. Major Alan Scott, the new commander of 60 Squadron, convinced Higgins to let him stay until a replacement arrived.

The next day, Bishop claimed his first victory when his was one of four Nieuports that engaged three Albatros D.III Scouts near St Leger. Bishop shot down and mortally wounded a Lieutenant Theiller, but his engine failed in the process. (Note: Shores (1991) has 12-victory ace Theiller as being killed in battle against 70 Squadron Sopwiths on 24 March; therefore Bishop's claim does not match with known losses.) Bishop landed in no man's land, 300 yards (270 m) from the German front line. After running to the Allied trenches, Bishop spent the night on the ground in a rainstorm. There Bishop wrote a letter home, starting, "I am writing this from a dugout 300 yards from our front line, after the most exciting adventure of my life." General Higgins personally congratulated Bishop and rescinded his order to return to flight school.

On 30 March 1917, Bishop was named a flight commander with a temporary promotion to captain a few days later. On 31 March, he scored his second victory. Bishop, in addition to the usual patrols with his squadron comrades, soon flew many unofficial "lone-wolf" missions deep into enemy territory, with the blessing of Major Scott. As a result, his total of enemy aircraft shot down increased rapidly. On 8 April, he scored his fifth victory and became an ace. To celebrate, Bishop's mechanic painted the aircraft's nose blue, the mark of an ace. Former 60 Squadron member Captain Albert Ball, at that time the Empire's highest scoring ace, had had a red spinner fitted.

Bishop's no-holds-barred style of flying always had him "at the front of the pack," leading his pilots into battle over hostile territory. Bishop soon realized that this could eventually see him shot down; after one patrol, a mechanic counted 210 bullet holes in his aircraft. His new method of using the surprise attack proved successful; he claimed 12 aircraft in April alone, and was awarded the Military Cross for his participation in the Battle of Vimy Ridge. The successes of Bishop and his blue-nosed aircraft were noticed by the Germans, and they began referring to him as "Hell's Handmaiden". Ernst Udet called him "the greatest English scouting ace" and one Jasta had a bounty on his head.

On 30 April, Bishop survived an encounter with Jasta 11 and Manfred von Richthofen, the Red Baron. In May, Bishop received the Distinguished Service Order for shooting down two aircraft while being attacked by four others.

On 2 June 1917, Bishop flew a solo mission behind enemy lines to attack a German-held aerodrome, where he claimed that he shot down three aircraft that were taking off to attack him and destroyed several more on the ground. For this feat, he was awarded the Victoria Cross (VC), although it has been suggested that he may have embellished his success, most notably by historian, Brereton Greenhous, in his 2002 book The Making of Billy Bishop. His VC (awarded 30 August 1917) was one of two awarded in violation of the warrant requiring witnesses (the other being the Unknown Soldier), and since the German records have been lost and the archived papers relating to the VC were lost as well, there is no way of confirming whether there were any witnesses. It seems to have been common practice at this time to allow Bishop to claim victories without requiring confirmation or verification from other witnesses.

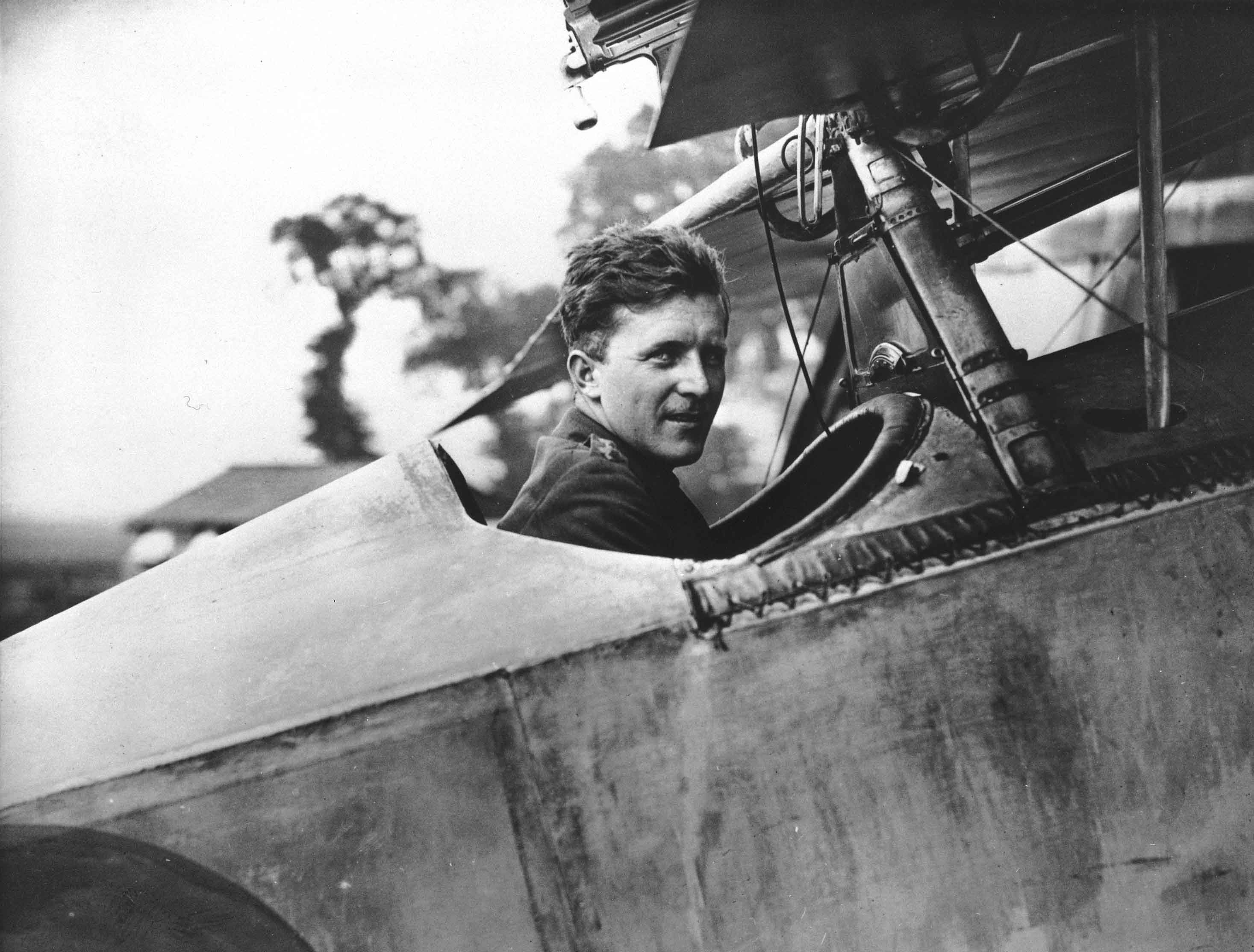
Bishop in the cockpit of his Nieuport 17, c. August 1917. During this period, Bishop became the highest scoring flying ace in the Royal Flying Corps.

In July, 60 Squadron received new Royal Aircraft Factory S.E.5s, a faster and more powerful aircraft with better pilot visibility. In August 1917, Bishop passed the late Albert Ball in victories to become (temporarily) the highest scoring ace in the RFC and the third top ace of the war, behind only the Red Baron and René Fonck.

At the end of August 1917, Bishop was appointed as the Chief Instructor at the School of Aerial Gunnery and given the temporary rank of major.

=== Leave to Canada ===
Bishop returned home on leave to Canada in fall 1917, where he was acclaimed a hero and helped boost the morale of the Canadian public, who were growing tired of the war. On 17 October 1917, Bishop married his longtime fiancée, Margaret Eaton Burden. After the wedding, he was assigned to the British War Mission in Washington, D.C. to help the Americans build an air force. While stationed there, he wrote his autobiography entitled Winged Warfare.

=== Return to Europe ===
Upon his return to England in April 1918, Bishop was promoted to major and given command of No. 85 Squadron RAF, the "Flying Foxes". A newly formed squadron equipped with S.E.5a scout planes, Bishop was able to choose many of the pilots. On 22 May, the unit moved to Petit Synthe, France and five days later Bishop downed a German observation plane in his first combat since August 1917. Over the next few days, Bishop destroyed another eight aircraft, including German ace Paul Billik, bringing his official score to 59 and making him the leading Allied ace once more him above James McCudden.

The Government of Canada was becoming increasingly worried about the effect on morale if Bishop were to be killed, so on 18 June he was ordered to return to England to help organize the new Canadian Flying Corps. Bishop was not pleased with the order coming so soon after his return to France. He wrote to his wife: "This is ever so annoying." The order specified that he was to leave France by noon on 19 June. On that morning, Bishop decided to fly one last solo patrol. In just 15 minutes of combat, he added another five victories to his total. He claimed to have downed two Pfalz D.IIIa scout planes, caused another two to collide with each other, and shot down a German reconnaissance aircraft.

On 5 August, Bishop was promoted to lieutenant-colonel and was given the post of "Officer Commanding-designate of the Canadian Air Force Section of the General Staff, Headquarters Overseas Military Forces of Canada." He was on board a ship returning from a reporting visit to Canada when news of the armistice arrived. Bishop was discharged from the Canadian Expeditionary Force on 31 December and returned to Canada.

By the end of the war, he had claimed some 72 air victories, including two balloons, 52 and two shared "destroyed" with 16 "out of control". However, two official historians for the Royal Canadian Air Force, Hugh Halliday and Brereton Greenhous argue the real number was far lower, the latter putting this as low as 27.

== Post-war career ==
After the war, Bishop toured the principal cities in the United States and lectured on aerial warfare. He established an importing firm, Interallied Aircraft Corporation, and a short-lived passenger air service with fellow ace William Barker, but after legal and financial problems, and a serious crash, the partnership and company were dissolved. In 1921, Bishop and his family moved to Britain, where he had various business interests connected with flying. In 1928, he was the guest of honour at a gathering of German air aces in Berlin and was made an Honorary Member of the Association. In 1929 he became chairman of British Air Lines. However, the family's wealth was wiped out in the crash of 1929 and they had to move back to Canada, where he became vice-president of the McColl-Frontenac Oil Company.

=== Second World War ===
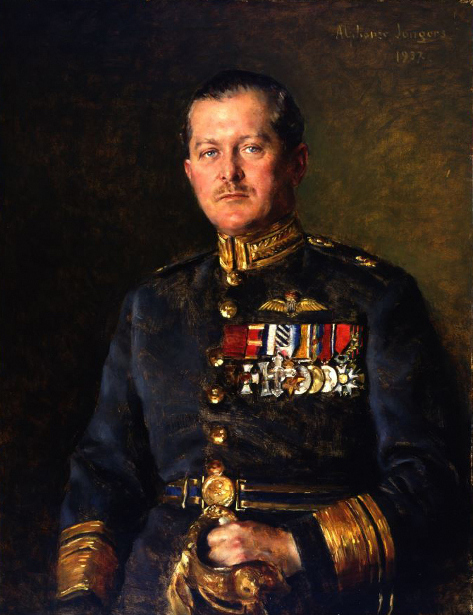
Air Marshal Billy Bishop in dress uniform.

In January 1936, Bishop was appointed the first Canadian air vice-marshal. Shortly after the outbreak of war in 1939, he was promoted to the rank of air marshal in the Royal Canadian Air Force. In January 1940 he was appointed Director of Recruiting for the Royal Canadian Air Force. He was so successful in this role that many applicants had to be turned away. Bishop created a system for training pilots across Canada and became instrumental in setting up and promoting the British Commonwealth Air Training Plan, which trained over 167,000 airmen in Canada during the Second World War. In 1942, he appeared as himself in the film Captains of the Clouds, a Hollywood tribute to the RCAF.

By 1944 the stress of the war had taken a serious toll on Bishop's health, and he resigned his post in the RCAF to return to private enterprise in Montreal, Quebec, before retiring in 1952. His son later commented that he looked 70 years old on his 50th birthday in 1944. However, Bishop remained active in the aviation world, predicting the phenomenal growth of commercial aviation postwar. His efforts to bring some organization to the nascent field led to the formation of the International Civil Aviation Organization (ICAO) in Montreal. He wrote a second book at this time, Winged Peace, advocating international control of global air power.

With the outbreak of the Korean War, Bishop again offered to return to his recruitment role, but he was in poor health and was politely refused by the RCAF. He died in his sleep on 11 September 1956, at the age of 62, while wintering in Palm Beach, Florida. His funeral service was held with full Air Force Honours in Toronto, Ontario. The body was cremated and the ashes interred in the family plot in Greenwood Cemetery, Owen Sound, Ontario. A memorial service for Air Marshal Bishop was held in St Paul's Church, Bristol, England, on 19 September 1956.

== Family ==
On 17 October 1917, at Timothy Eaton Memorial Church in Toronto he married Margaret Eaton Burden, his longtime fiancée and daughter of Mr C. E. Burden (a granddaughter of Timothy Eaton and sister of ace Henry John Burden). Their eldest child, William Avery Victor Bishop, died at 2 weeks old (23 March–6 April 1920). Their surviving children were a son, Arthur, and a daughter, Margaret.

Both of the surviving Bishop children became aviators:

- Arthur Christian William Avery Bishop (1923 London, England – 2013 Toronto) was presented with his wings by his father during the Second World War; Arthur went on to become a Spitfire pilot and served with No. 401 Squadron RCAF in 1944. After the war, he became a journalist, advertising executive, entrepreneur and author. He married Priscilla (Cilla) Jean Aylen and had two children (Diana and William).
- Margaret Marise (Jackie) Willis-O’Connor (1926 London – 2013 Ottawa) was a radio operator during the Second World War, whom Bishop presented with a Wireless Sparks Badge in 1944.

== Honours and tributes ==
=== Official citations ===
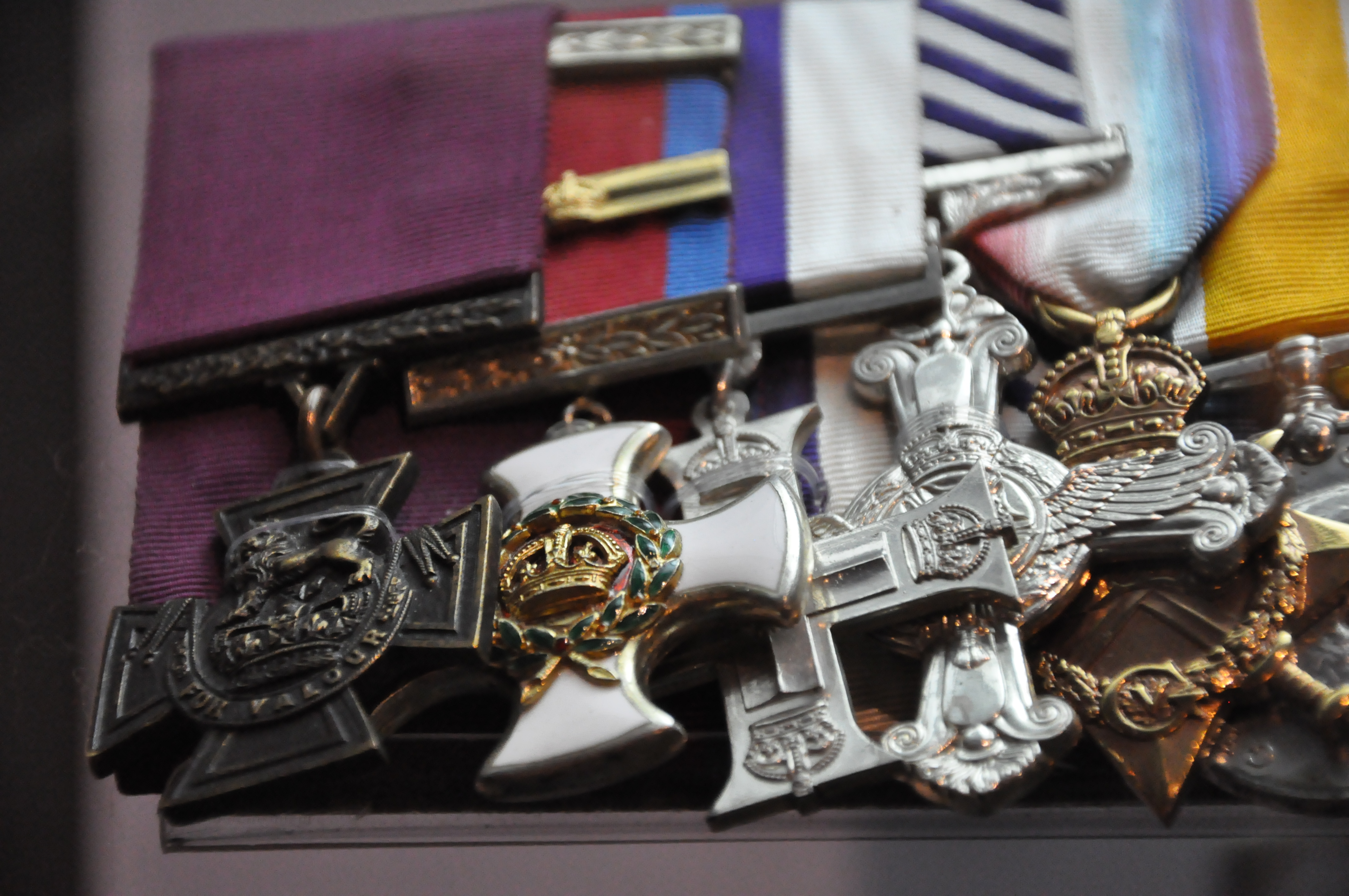
Billy Bishop's decorations (now part of Canadian War Museum collection) include (left to right) Victoria Cross, Distinguished Service Order with Bar, Military Cross, Distinguished Flying Cross, 1914–1915 Star, British War Medal 1914–1920.

Bishop's decorations include the Victoria Cross, Distinguished Service Order & Bar, Military Cross, Distinguished Flying Cross, légion d'honneur and the Croix de Guerre with palm. He was made a Companion of the Order of the Bath in the King's Birthday Honours List of 1 June 1944.

==== Victoria Cross ====
The citation for his VC, published in The London Gazette on 11 August 1917, read:

For most conspicuous bravery, determination, and skill. Captain Bishop, who had been sent out to work independently, flew first of all to an enemy aerodrome; finding no machines about, he flew on to another aerodrome about three miles southeast, which was at least 12 miles the other side of the line. Seven machines, some with their engines running, were on the ground. He attacked these from about fifty feet, and a mechanic, who was starting one of the engines, was seen to fall. One of the machines got off the ground, but at a height of 60 feet, Captain Bishop fired 15 rounds into it at very close range, and it crashed to the ground. A second machine got off the ground, into which he fired 30 rounds at 150 yards range, and it fell into a tree. Two more machines then rose from the aerodrome. One of these he engaged at a height of 1,000 feet, emptying the rest of his drum of ammunition. This machine crashed 300 yards from the aerodrome, after which Captain Bishop emptied a whole drum into the fourth hostile machine, and then flew back to his station. Four hostile scouts were about 1,250 feet above him for about a mile of his return journey, but they would not attack. His machine was very badly shot about by machine gun fire from the ground.

==== Distinguished Flying Cross ====
His citation for the Distinguished Flying Cross read:

A most successful and fearless fighter in the air, whose acts of outstanding bravery have already been recognised by the awards of the Victoria Cross, Distinguished Service Order, Bar to the Distinguished Service Order, and Military Cross. For the award of the Distinguished Flying Cross now conferred upon him he has rendered signally valuable services in personally destroying twenty-five enemy machines in twelve days—five of which he destroyed on the last day of his service at the front. The total number of machines destroyed by this distinguished officer is seventy-two, and his value as a moral factor to the Royal Air Force cannot be overestimated.

==== Distinguished Service Order ====
His citation for the Distinguished Service Order read:

For conspicuous gallantry and devotion to duty. While in a single-seater he attacked three hostile machines, two of which he brought down, although in the meantime he was himself attacked by four other hostile machines. His courage and determination have set a fine example to others.

==== Distinguished Service Order Bar ====
His citation for the Distinguished Service Order bar read:

For conspicuous gallantry and devotion to duty when engaging hostile aircraft. His consistent dash and great fearlessness have set a magnificent example to the pilots of his squadron. He has destroyed no less than 45 hostile machines within the past 5 months, frequently attacking enemy formations single-handed, and on all occasions displaying a fighting spirit and determination to get to close quarter with his opponents which have earned the admiration of all in contact with him.

=== Other tributes ===
Bishop also holds a number of non-military awards. In 1967, Bishop was inducted into the International Air & Space Hall of Fame. An award is also named in honour of Bishop. The Air Force Association of Canada approved the establishment of a trophy to commemorate the late Air Marshal W.A. Bishop, VC, in recognition of his "outstanding contribution to the legacy of excellence in Canadian aviation".

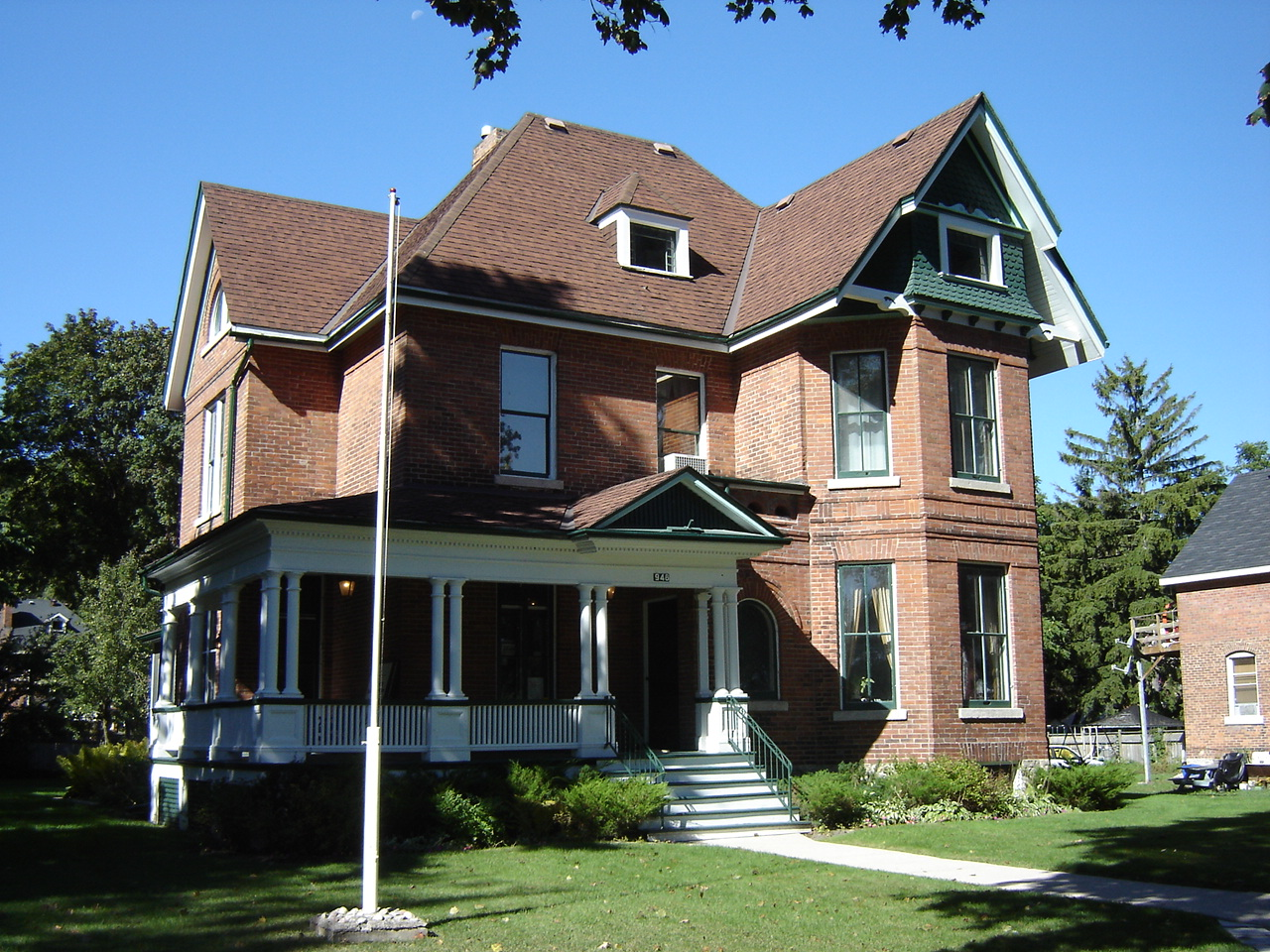
The home Bishop grew up in later became the Billy Bishop Home and Museum.

Billy Bishop's childhood home was re-purposed into the Billy Bishop Home and Museum in 1987. The museum is in Owen Sound, Ontario. The museum has exhibits on the family, Bishop himself and veterans. There is a permanent exhibit with information on Bishop at the Grey Roots Museum and Archives, just south of Owen Sound.

Bishop's life has also been the subject of a number of works in media. Billy Bishop Goes to War feature film and Canadian musical, written by John MacLachlan Gray in collaboration with the actor Eric Peterson in 1978. A Hero to Me: The Billy Bishop Story – WW1 Canadian flying Ace, a documentary depicting the story of "Billy" Bishop from the perspective of his granddaughter Diana, was produced for Global Television and TVO in 2003.

In addition to television and film, Bishop has also been featured on Canadian stamps. On 12 August 1994, Canada Post issued "Billy Bishop, Air Ace" as part of the Great Canadians series. The stamps were designed by Pierre Fontaine, based on illustrations by Bernard Leduc. The 43¢ stamps are perforated 13.5 and were printed by Canadian Bank Note Company, Limited.

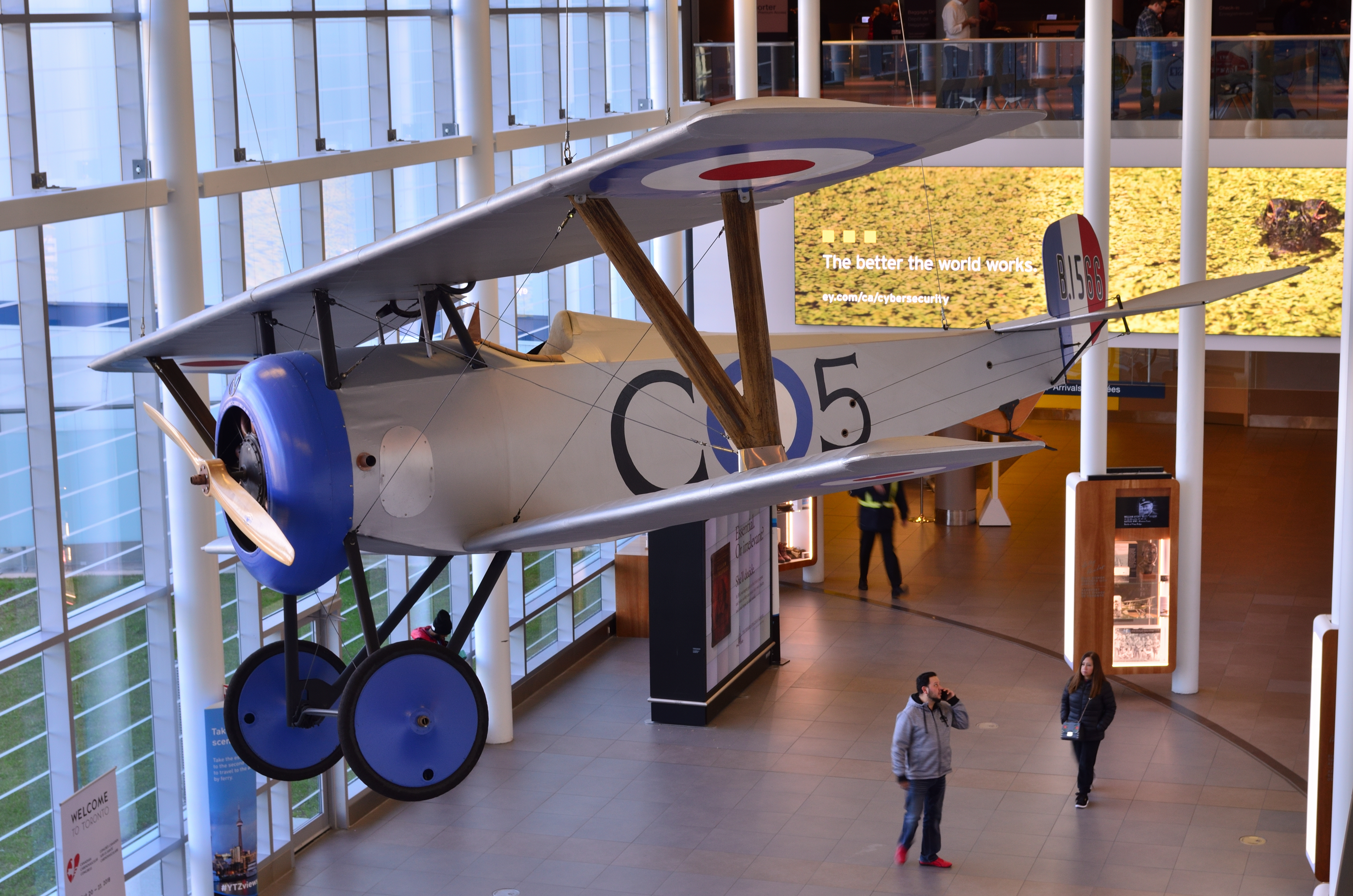
Replica of Bishop's Nieuport 17 fighter at Billy Bishop Toronto City Airport, a Canadian airport that bears his name.

Several places also have honoured Bishop by bearing his namesake. Three airports in Ontario have been named after Bishop at various times. Toronto's Pearson International Airport was originally named Bishop Field Toronto Airport Malton. The airport between Meaford and Owen Sound was officially named Owen Sound Billy Bishop Regional Airport. Then, in 2009 Toronto's island airport was renamed Billy Bishop Toronto City Airport creating a situation where two airports in the province had similar names. This was resolved in September 2024 when the Meaford/Owen Sound airport changed its name to Major-General Richard Rohmer Meaford International Airport, after the Second World War veteran Richard Rohmer.

Other forms in which Bishop is memorialized includes:

- "Billy Bishop Private" is a roadway on private land at Ottawa Airport, Ottawa, Ontario, where the "Billy Bishop Room" for visiting dignitaries also exists.
- "Billy Bishop Way" is a street near the Downsview Airport in Toronto, Ontario.
- "Billy Bishop Park" is a public park in Ottawa, created with the help of the Royal Canadian Legion Branch 638 (Kanata)
- "Mount Bishop", a 2,850-metre-high (9,350 ft) mountain on the Alberta – British Columbia border.
- "Bishop Building", the 1st Canadian Air Division and the Canadian NORAD Region Headquarters in Winnipeg, Manitoba.
- "Billy Bishop Legion Branch 176" in Vancouver, British Columbia.
- "CFB Borden Billy Bishop Centre", a hazardous materials training school at CFB Borden in Ontario.
- "Billy Bishop entrance" at Hamilton, Ontario's Memorial School.
- "Billy Bishop Hangar" at the Brampton, Ontario Flying Club.

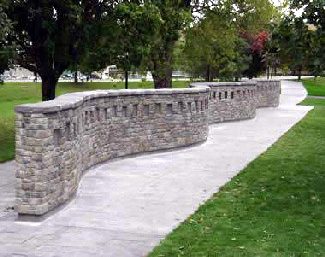
Bishop's name is featured on the Wall of Honour, at the Royal Military College of Canada

- 943 Air Marshal William Avery "Billy" Bishop VC, CB, DSO, & Bar, MC, DFC, ED (1894–1956) was added to the wall of honour at the Royal Military College of Canada in Kingston, Ontario in 2009.
- Air Force Association of Canada's Air Marshal W. A. Bishop Memorial Trophy is one of the highest awards for aviation in Canada.
- Sqn 167 Air Marshal Bishop Squadron, Royal Canadian Air Cadets, Owen Sound, Ontario
- Bishop's former home in Ottawa, Ontario, constructed in 1905 in the Queen Anne Revival style, has been opened to the public in the annual Doors Open Ottawa showcase of buildings.

== Legacy and later controversy ==
Bishop's life was depicted in the 1978 Canadian play Billy Bishop Goes to War. It also led indirectly to a 1983 CBC Television documentary called The Kid Who Couldn't Miss, produced by the National Film Board of Canada. The show, a "docudrama" combining known history for credibility with fictitious "mock interviews" with actors portraying Bishop and others, suggested that Bishop faked his famous attack on the German aerodrome. In one particularly contentious scene, his mechanic claims that the damage to his fighter was confined to a small circle in a non-critical area, implying that Bishop had landed his aircraft off-field, shot holes in it, and flown home with claims of combat damage.

In reality, his mechanic was his biggest supporter, and the scene was entirely fictitious. The mechanic insisted that Bishop had not fabricated the damage. Canadian authors Dan McCaffery and David Bashow also presented circumstantial evidence that Bishop did not fake the attack.

After years of controversy over Bishop's record, mainly because very few of his claimed victories were witnessed by anyone else or could be confirmed from the few surviving German records, the show led to an inquiry by the Canadian government in 1985. The Standing Senate Committee on Social Affairs, Science and Technology discredited the documentary, saying it was an unfair and inaccurate portrayal of Bishop. There is some dispute about whether Bishop or Mick Mannock had the highest score of any British Empire First World War fighter ace. The Canadian Encyclopedia states: "Investigation by a Senate sub-committee exposed a number of minor errors in this apparent 'documentary' and confirmed that statements had been wrongly attributed and incidents shifted in time for dramatic effect. However, the senators were unable to demonstrate that Bishop's claims were valid, and consequently recommended only that the film be labelled as docu-drama".

Some of Bishop's other claims have also been challenged. While combat reports and claims of both sides are littered with well-intentioned errors and accidental duplicate claims, there are two phases of Bishop's life in which German records can provide no supporting evidence. In his book on Victoria Cross airmen of the First World War, author Alex Revell quotes aviation historian Philip Markham's view about German records of the events of 2 June 1917 (the day of Bishop's VC award): "Not a shred of evidence to support Bishop's claims." Referring to Bishop's claims in early to mid-1918, Revell says another aviation historian, Ed Ferko, carried out extensive research on German records in 1987. Revell says that Ferko failed "to match a single victory claim made by Bishop against a known German loss for the day, time or place in question." However, distinguished First World War aviation historian Peter Kilduff says in his biography (Billy Bishop VC: Lone Wolf Hunter) that Bishop may have had as many as 21 matches in piecemeal German records. Kilduff also makes a case for the unreliability of German records. He cites examples in which masses of data were destroyed by retreating German forces and instances of the German former air ministry having been guilty of "obfuscation" in denying losses when casualties had been incurred.

Military offices
Vacant Title last held by Ernest Lloyd Janney; As OC the Canadian Aviation Corps in 1915	Officer Commanding the Canadian Air Force; 1918	Vacant Title next held by Arthur Kellam Tylee; As Air Officer Commanding
