= Mount Loomis =

Mountain in Western Canada

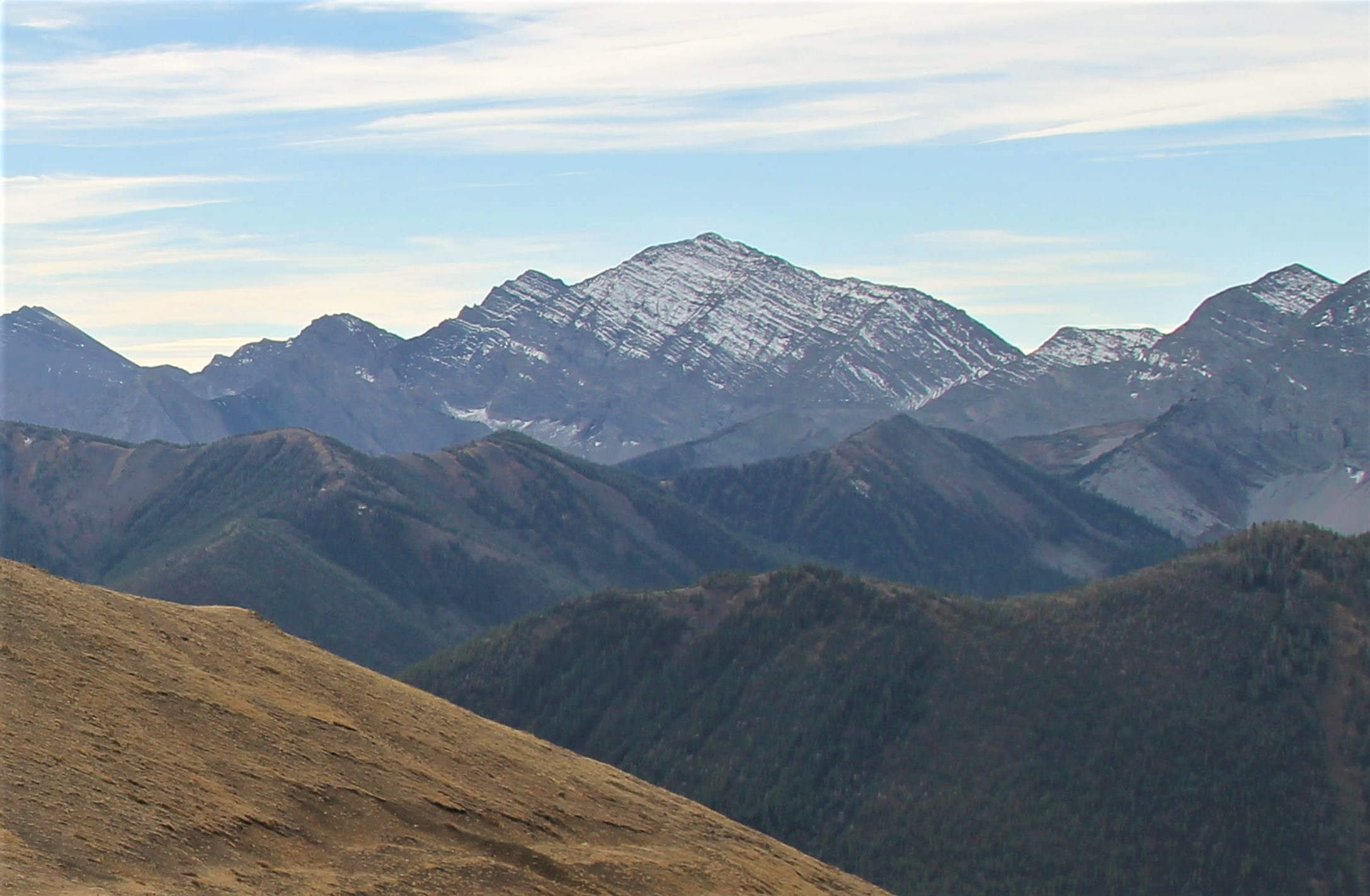
- North aspect

Highest point
- Elevation: 2,798 m (9,180 ft)
- Prominence: 328 m (1,076 ft)
- Parent peak: Mount Bishop (2850 m)
- Listing: Mountains of Alberta; Mountains of British Columbia
- Coordinates: 50°27′45″N 114°55′11″W

Geography
- Location within Alberta Location within British Columbia Location within Canada
- Country: Canada
- Provinces: Alberta and British Columbia
- Protected area: Kananaskis Country
- Parent range: Elk Range
- Topo map: NTS 82J7 Mount Head

Mount Loomis is located on the eastern side of the Elk Valley and straddles the Continental Divide marking the Alberta-British Columbia border. It was named in 1918 after Frederick Oscar Warren Loomis, a Canadian Army general who served in World War I.

== Geology ==
Mount Loomis is composed of sedimentary rock laid down during the Precambrian to Jurassic periods. Formed in shallow seas, this sedimentary rock was pushed east and over the top of younger rock during the Laramide orogeny.

== See also ==
- List of peaks on the Alberta–British Columbia border
