= Mount Pocaterra =

Mountain in Alberta, Canada

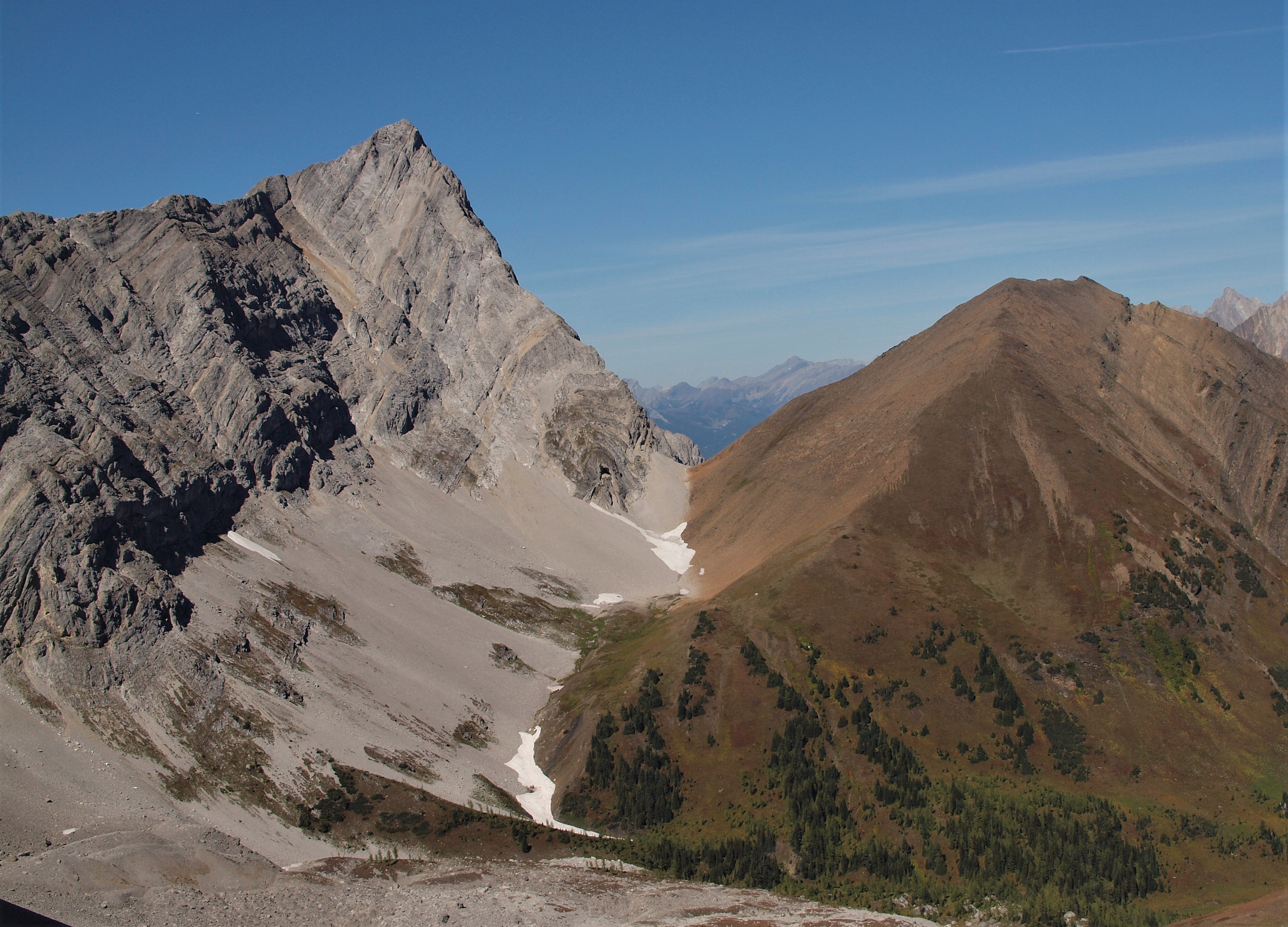
- Mt. Pocaterra (left), Pocaterra Ridge (right) from the south

Highest point
- Elevation: 2,941 m (9,649 ft)
- Prominence: 461 m (1,512 ft)
- Parent peak: Mount Rae (3218 m)
- Listing: Mountains of Alberta
- Coordinates: 50°35′57″N 115°01′44″W

Geography
- Location within Alberta
- Country: Canada
- Province: Alberta
- Parent range: Elk Range
- Topo map: NTS 82J11 Kananaskis Lakes

Climbing
- Easiest route: Moderate Scramble via Mt. Tyrwhitt

Mount Pocaterra is the unofficial name of a rocky formation named after the Pocaterra Creek in the same region. It is located in the Elk Range in Alberta. This peak is located on the crest of a ridge, about 1.5 km north of the lower Mount Tyrwhitt. The peak is a double summit, with the north summit slightly higher.

== Gallery ==
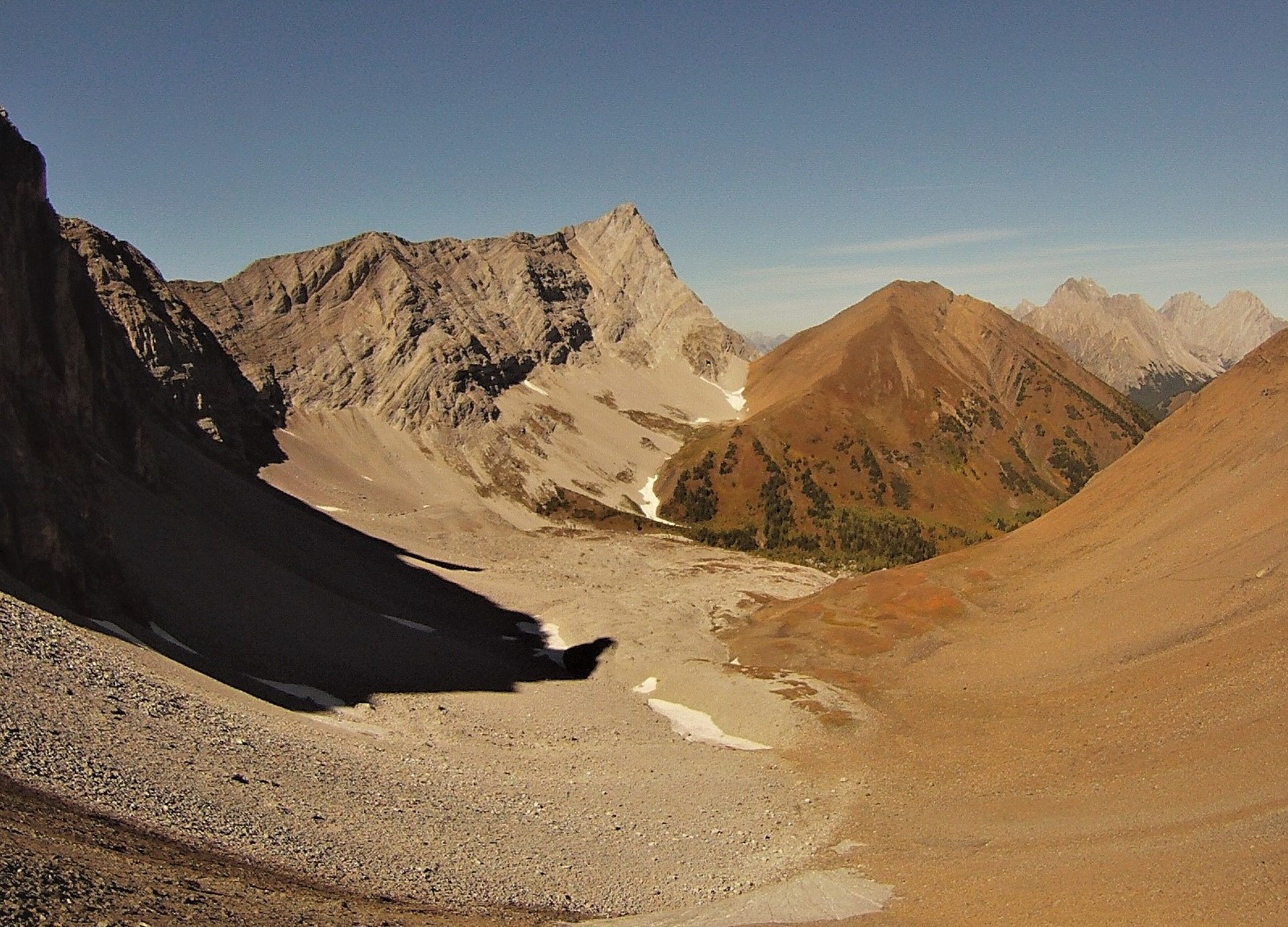

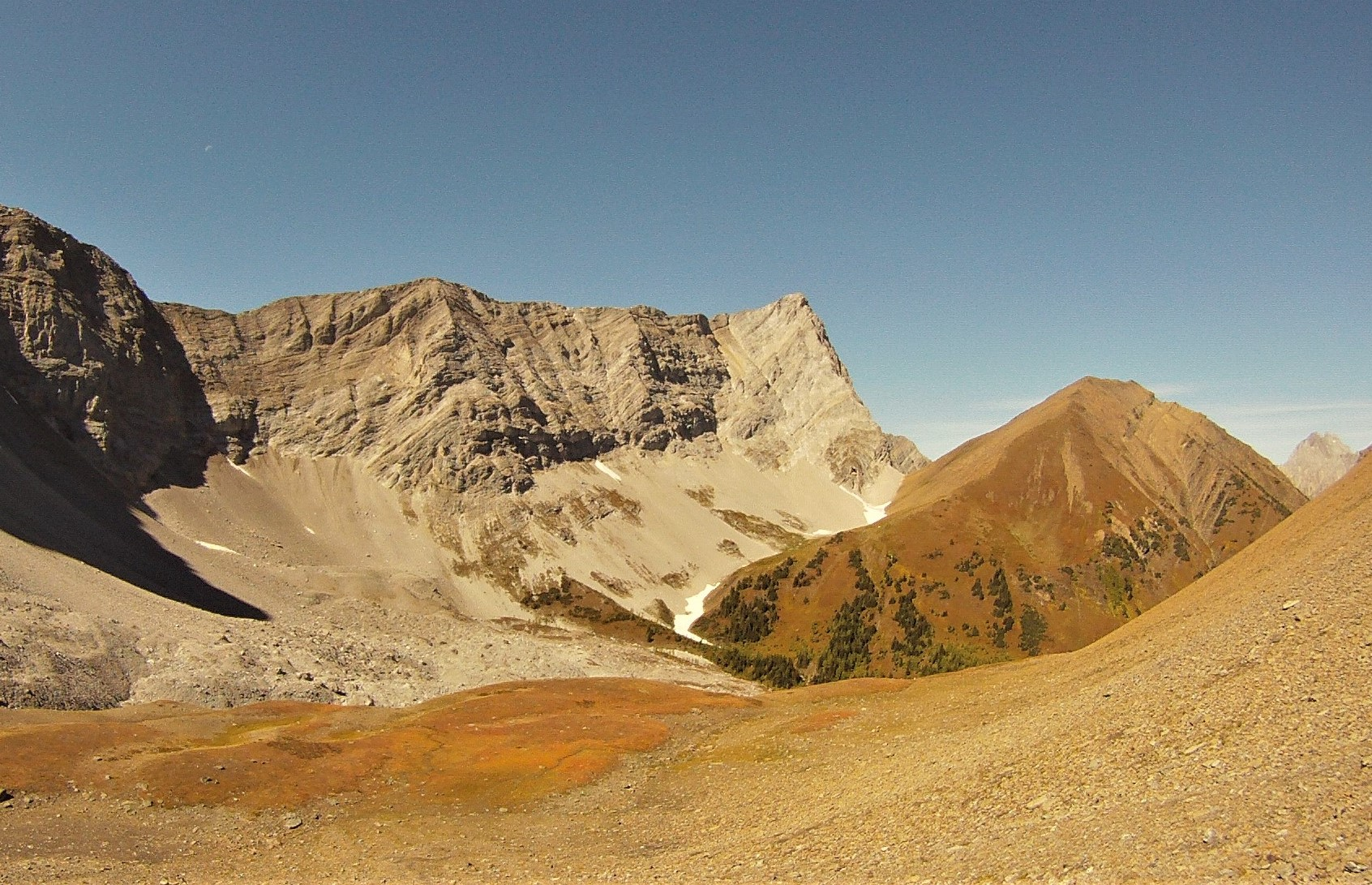

== See also ==
- Geography of Alberta
