= Mount Odlum =

Mountain in Alberta/British Columbia, Canada

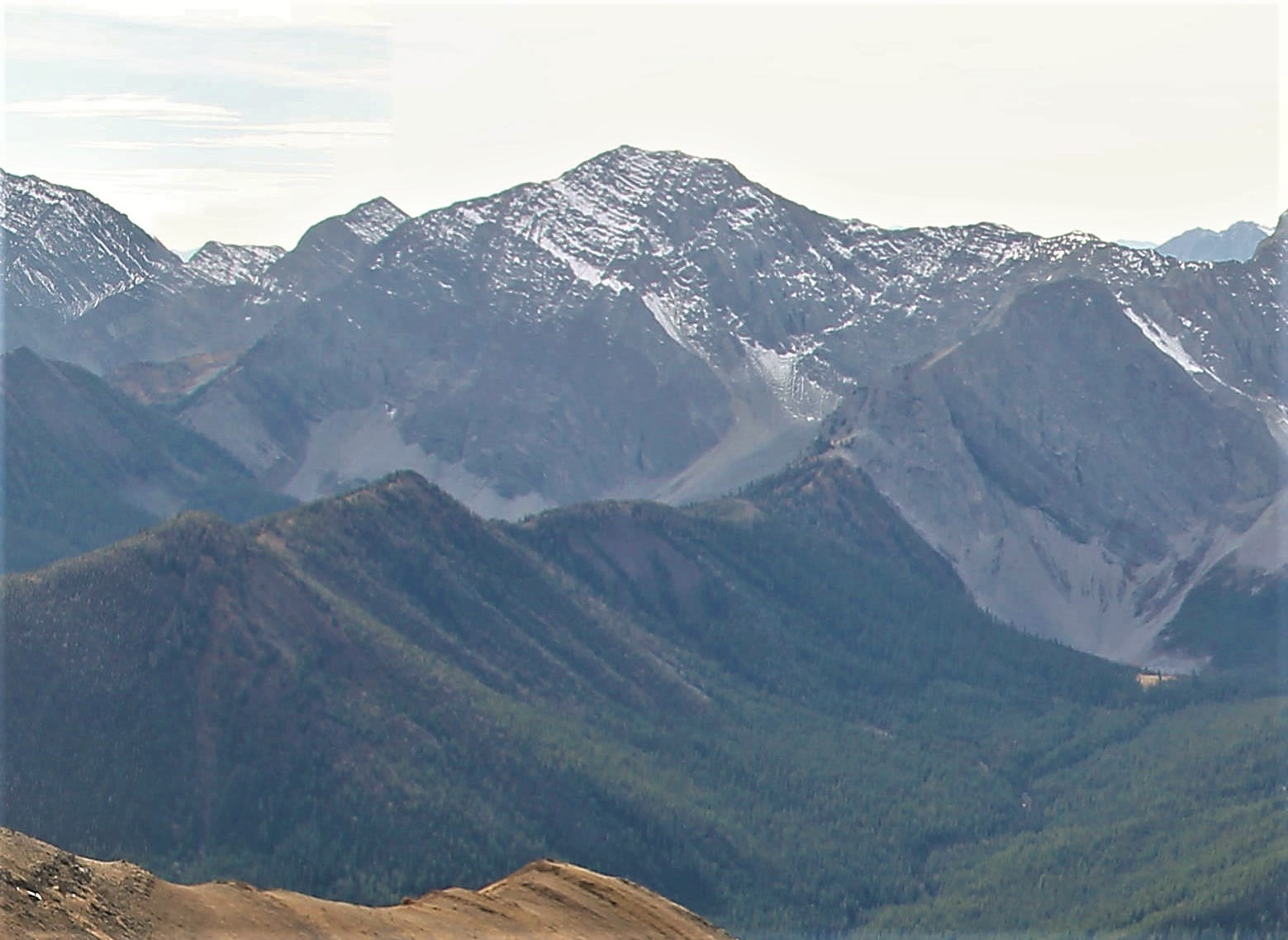
- North aspect

Highest point
- Elevation: 2,729 m (8,953 ft)
- Prominence: 184 m (604 ft)
- Parent peak: Running Rain Peak (2753 m)
- Listing: Mountains of Alberta; Mountains of British Columbia
- Coordinates: 50°29′10″N 114°56′17″W

Geography
- Location within Alberta Location within British Columbia Location within Canada
- Country: Canada
- Provinces: Alberta and British Columbia
- District: Kootenay Land District
- Parent range: Elk Range
- Topo map: NTS 82J7 Mount Head

Mount Odlum is located on the provincial border of Alberta and British Columbia on the Continental Divide. It was named in 1917 after Victor Wentworth Odlum, Brigadier-General in the Canadian army during World War I. After the war, he entered politics from 1924–1947.

== Geology ==
Mount Odlum is composed of sedimentary rock laid down during the Precambrian to Jurassic periods. Formed in shallow seas, this sedimentary rock was pushed east and over the top of younger rock during the Laramide orogeny.

== See also ==
- List of peaks on the Alberta–British Columbia border
