= Billy Bishop Home and Museum =

Billy Bishop Museum
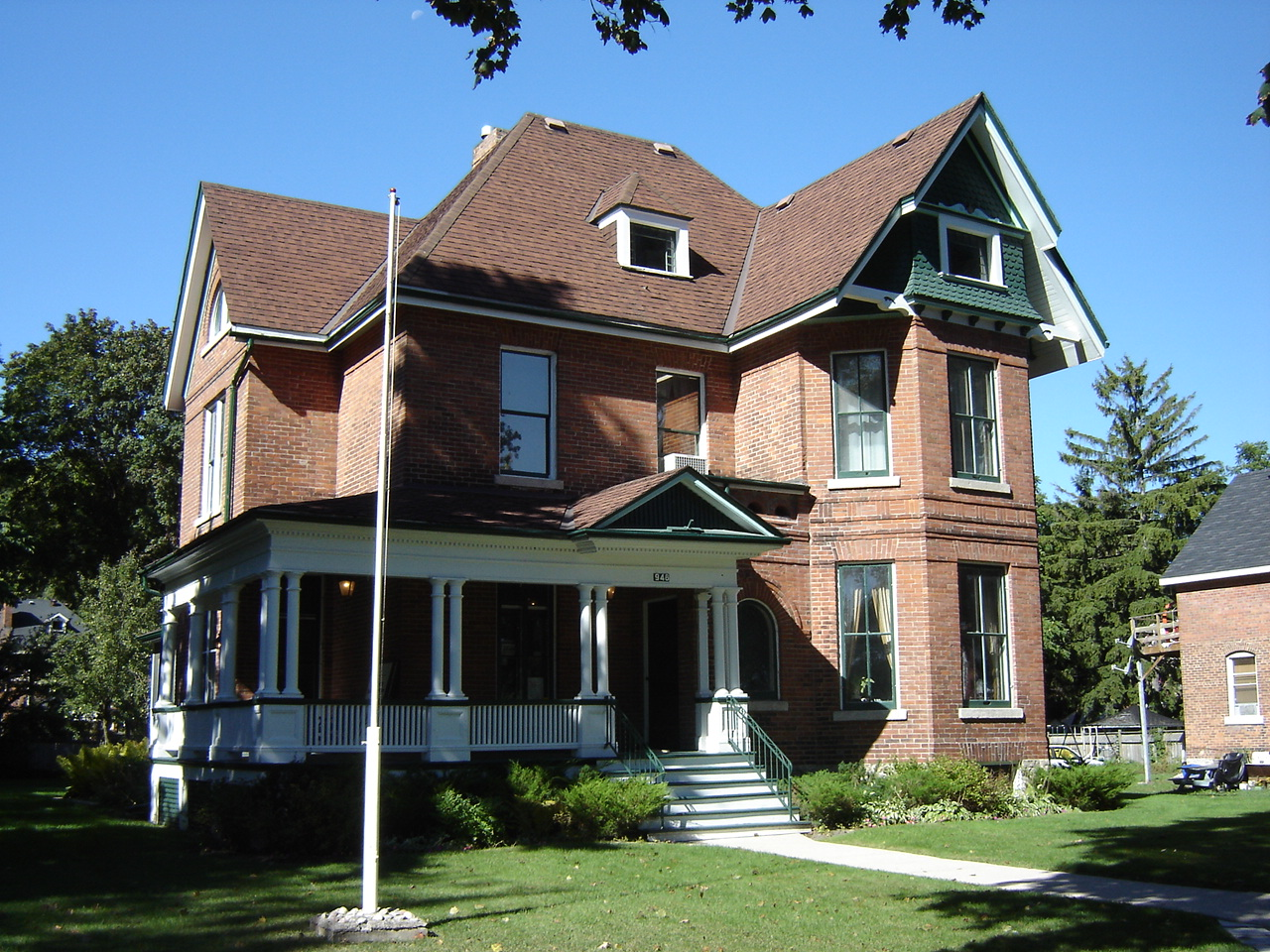

- Location in southern ONtario
- Established: 1987
- Location: 948 Third Avenue West Owen Sound, Ontario, Canada
- Coordinates: 44°33′59″N 80°56′51.5″W
- Website: www.billybishop.org

National Historic Site of Canada
- Official name: Billy Bishop Boyhood Home
- Designated: 2002

The Billy Bishop Museum is a museum and National Historic Site of Canada in Owen Sound, Ontario, Canada that commemorates the life and achievements of First World War flying ace and Victoria Cross winner Air Marshall William Avery "Billy" Bishop VC, CB, DSO and Bar, MC, DFC. The museum is located at his birthplace and childhood home before he went to Royal Military College of Canada in Kingston, Ontario. It features artifacts including uniforms, medals, photos, models, etc. from Canadians who fought during World War I and World War II. The house has the original hardwood floors, Victorian furnishings and other personal possessions of the Bishop family. Billy Bishop Museum is a non-profit organization committed to preserving local history, including the childhood home of Victoria Cross recipient William Avery “Billy” Bishop. The Museum seeks to engage the community by connecting local stories to the Canadian war experience and broader currents of global history. A gift shop is open during museum hours.

Bishop's modest gravesite is also in Owen Sound in Greenwood Cemetery. A plaque at the Billy Bishop Museum dedicated to William Avery "Billy" Bishop 1894-1956 was erected by the Historic Sites and Monuments Board of Canada. "Billy Bishop was renowned as a pilot with the Royal Flying Corps and Royal Air Force during World War I by shooting down at least 72 enemy aircraft and leading other daring missions against the enemy. For these exploits, he was awarded the Victoria Cross, the D.S.O. and other medals for bravery, becoming Canada's most decorated serviceman next to fellow aviator William Barker. Born in Owen Sound, he was educated here and at Royal Military College of Canada, Kingston. His later life was spent largely in England and Montreal. During part of the Second World War he served with the Royal Canadian Air Force in Ottawa as an honorary Air Marshal."

== Affiliations ==
The Museum is affiliated with: CMA, CHIN, and Virtual Museum of Canada.

== See also ==
- Billy Bishop
- Billy Bishop Goes to War
