= Mount McPhail =

Mountain in British Columbia and Alberta, Canada

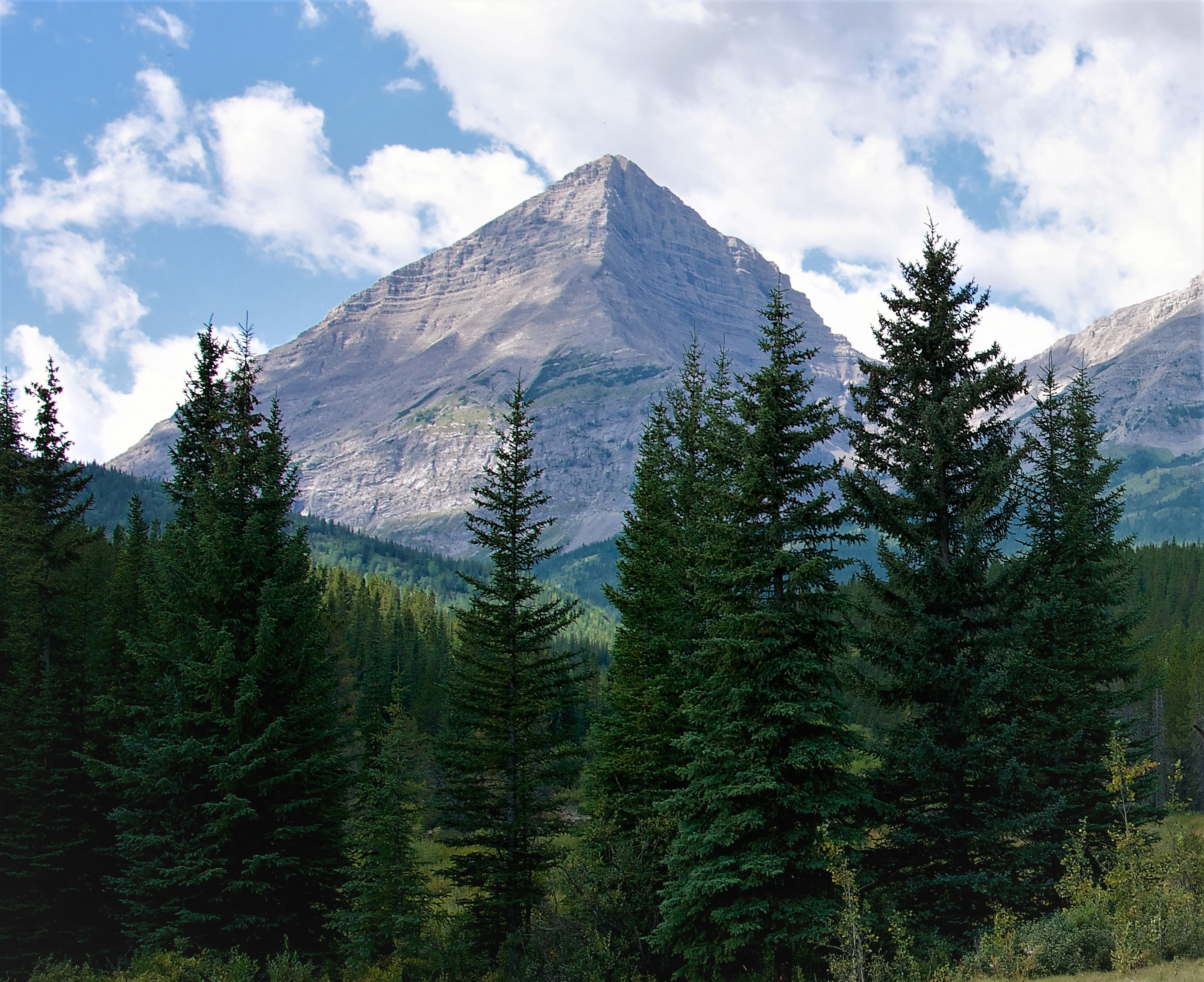
- East aspect

Highest point
- Elevation: 2,886 m (9,469 ft)
- Prominence: 676 m (2,218 ft)
- Parent peak: Mount Rae (3218 m)
- Listing: Mountains of Alberta; Mountains of British Columbia
- Coordinates: 50°24′29″N 114°51′40″W

Geography
- Location within Alberta Location within British Columbia Location within Canada
- Country: Canada
- Provinces: Alberta and British Columbia
- Parent range: Elk Range
- Topo map: NTS 82J7 Mount Head

Mount McPhail is a mountain located in the Elk Range of the Park Ranges of the Canadian Rockies and stands astride the British Columbia-Alberta border, which follows the Continental Divide in this area. The mountain was named in 1918 after Norman R. McPhail, a Canadian soldier who was killed in action during World War I.

== See also ==
- List of peaks on the Alberta–British Columbia border
