= Hugh Halliday =

Canadian military historian

Hugh A. Halliday
- Occupation: Military history

Hugh A. Halliday is a Canadian military historian based in Ottawa, Ontario. He served in the offices of the RCAF's Air Historian (1960–1965), Canadian Forces Directorate of History (1965–1968), taught at Niagara College (1968–1974) and was further employed at the Canadian War Museum (1974–1995) in various capacities including Curator of War Art, Curator of Posters and Photographs, and historian. His articles have been published in scholarly and mass-market military history publications and he has contributed to the Air Force Association of Canada's website respecting aerial awards. He and John Blatherwick provided information for a CD, "Courage and Service". produced by Service Publications of Ottawa.

== Books ==
- Valour Reconsidered: Inquiries Into the Victoria Cross and Other Awards for Extreme Bravery (2006)
- Not in the face of the enemy: Canadians awarded the Air Force Cross and Air Force Medal, 1918-1966 (2000)
- Murder among gentlemen: A history of duelling in Canada (1999)
- Canada's Air Forces (with Brerton Greenhaus, 1999)
- Wreck!: Canada's worst railway accidents (1997)
- Typhoon and Tempest: The Canadian Story (1992)
- The Royal Canadian Air Force at War, 1939-1945 (with Larry Milberry, 1990)
- Woody: A Fighter Pilot's Album (1987)
- The Little Blitz (1984)
- 242 Squadron (1982)
- The Tumbling Sky (1977)
- The Wreck of the Lady of the Lake (1974)
