= Elk Range (Canada) =

Mountain range in British Columbia and Alberta, Canada

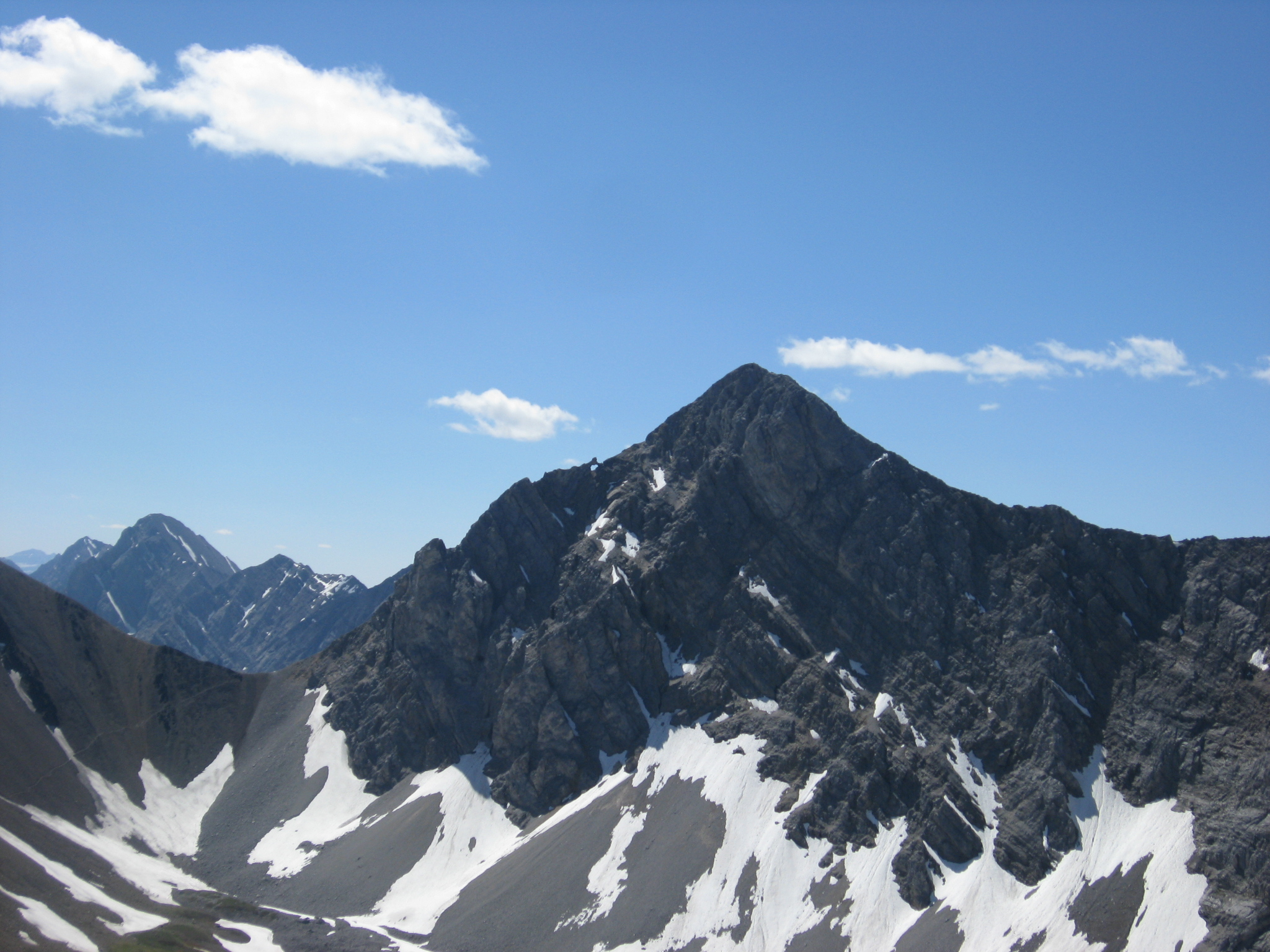
- Mt. Tyrwhitt from Pocaterra Ridge

Highest point
- Peak: Mount Pocaterra
- Elevation: 2,941 m (9,649 ft)
- Coordinates: 50°35′57″N 115°01′44″W

Dimensions
- Area: 234 km^{2} (90 mi^{2})

Geography
- Location within Alberta Location within British Columbia Location within Canada
- Country: Canada
- Provinces: British Columbia; Alberta
- Range coordinates: 50°31′09″N 114°57′14″W
- Parent range: Front Ranges
- Topo map: NTS 82J7 Mount Head

The Elk Range is a mountain range of the Canadian Rockies, located on the southern edge of Kananaskis on the Alberta-British Columbia border. The range was named for elk found on the mountain slopes and in the nearby Elk River valley. Originally known as the Elk Mountains in 1917, the name was formally changed to the Elk Range in 1951.

== Mountains ==
This range includes the following mountains and peaks:

Rank	Mountain / Peak	Elevation		Prominence		Coordinates
Rank	Mountain / Peak	m	ft	m	ft	Coordinates
1	Mount Pocaterra	2,941	9,649	461	1,512	50°35′57″N 115°1′44″W
2	Mount McPhail	2,886	9,469	676	2,218	50°24′29″N 114°51′40″W
3	Mount Tyrwhitt	2,874	9,429	216	709	50°34′56″N 115°0′58″W
4	Mount Bishop	2,850	9,350	359	1,178	50°26′24″N 114°52′48″W
5	Mount Loomis	2,798	9,180	328	1,076	50°27′45″N 114°55′11″W
6	Mount Odlum	2,729	8,953	184	604	50°29′10″N 114°56′17″W
