= Mount Tyrwhitt =

Mountain in Canada

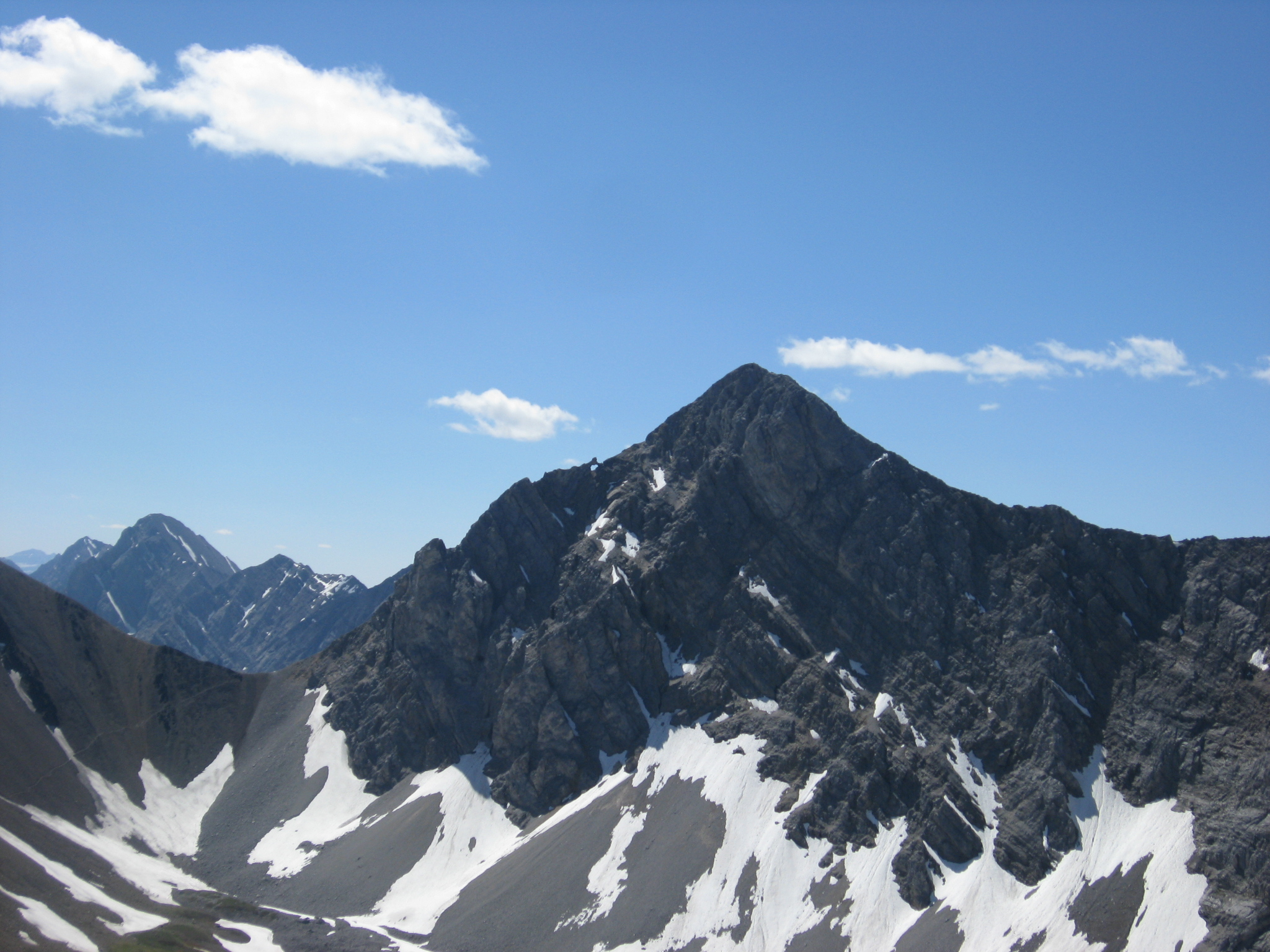
- Mount Tyrwhitt's north face with Grizzly col to the left

Highest point
- Elevation: 2,874 m (9,429 ft)
- Prominence: 216 m (709 ft)
- Parent peak: Mount Pocaterra (2941 m)
- Listing: Mountains of Alberta; Mountains of British Columbia
- Coordinates: 50°34′56″N 115°00′58″W

Geography
- Location within Alberta Location within British Columbia Location within Canada
- Country: Canada
- Provinces: Alberta and British Columbia
- District: Kootenay Land District
- Parent range: Elk Range
- Topo map: NTS 82J11 Kananaskis Lakes

Climbing
- First ascent: 1915 by the Interprovincial Boundary Commission
- Easiest route: Scramble (Moderate)

Mount Tyrwhitt is a mountain in British Columbia and Alberta, Canada, located between Highway 40 and Elk Pass in the Elk Range of the Canadian Rockies, west of the Highwood Pass parking lot in Kananaskis Country and south east of Upper Kananaskis Lake. Located on the Continental Divide, it is also therefore on the border between British Columbia and Alberta, which follows the Divide in this area.

The mountain was named in 1918 after First Admiral Reginald Tyrwhitt, a senior officer in the Royal Navy during the First World War.

== Gallery ==
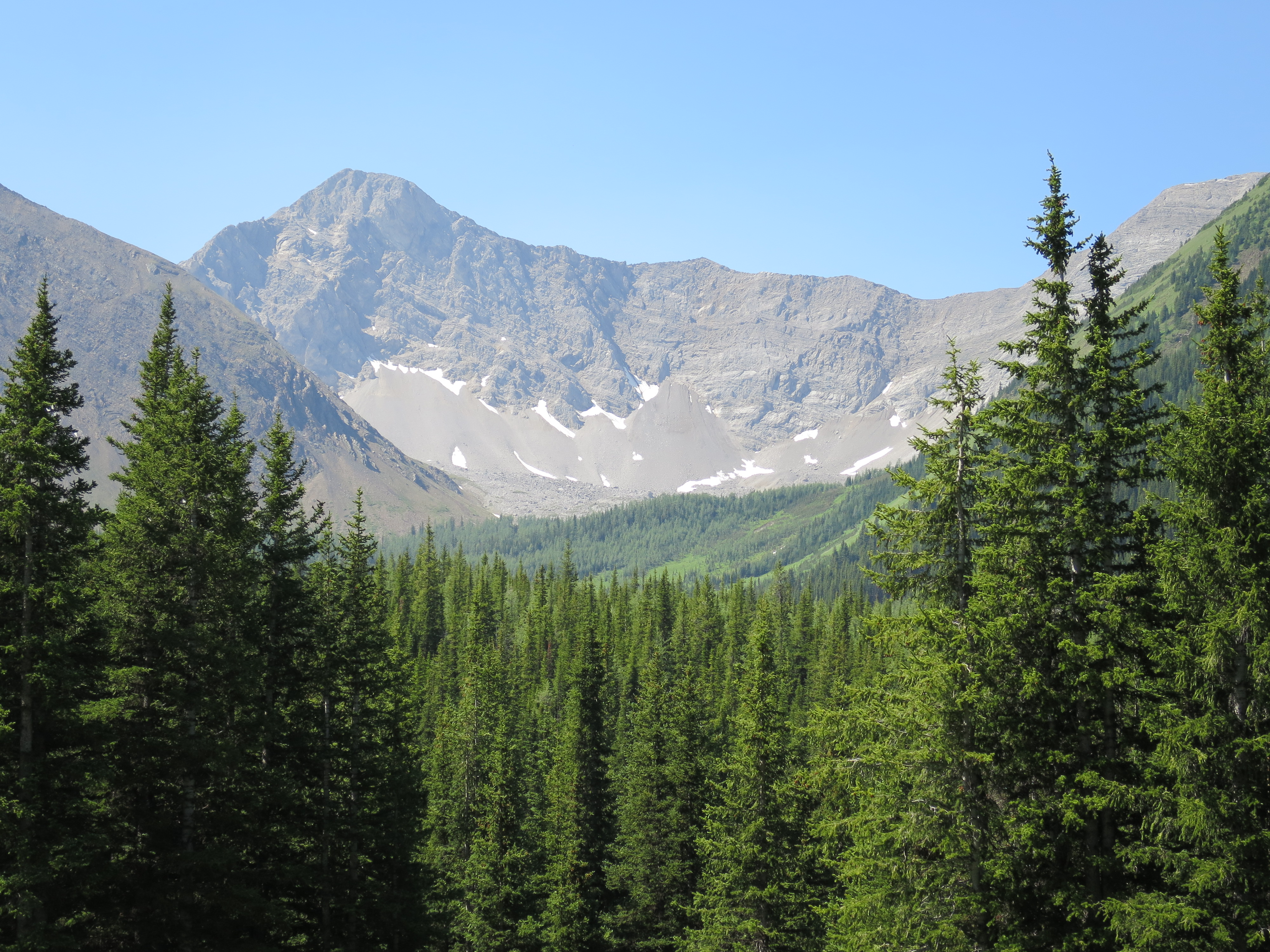
Mount Tyrwhitt from Kananaskis Trail

== See also ==
- List of peaks on the Alberta-British Columbia border
