= Grey Roots Museum and Archives =

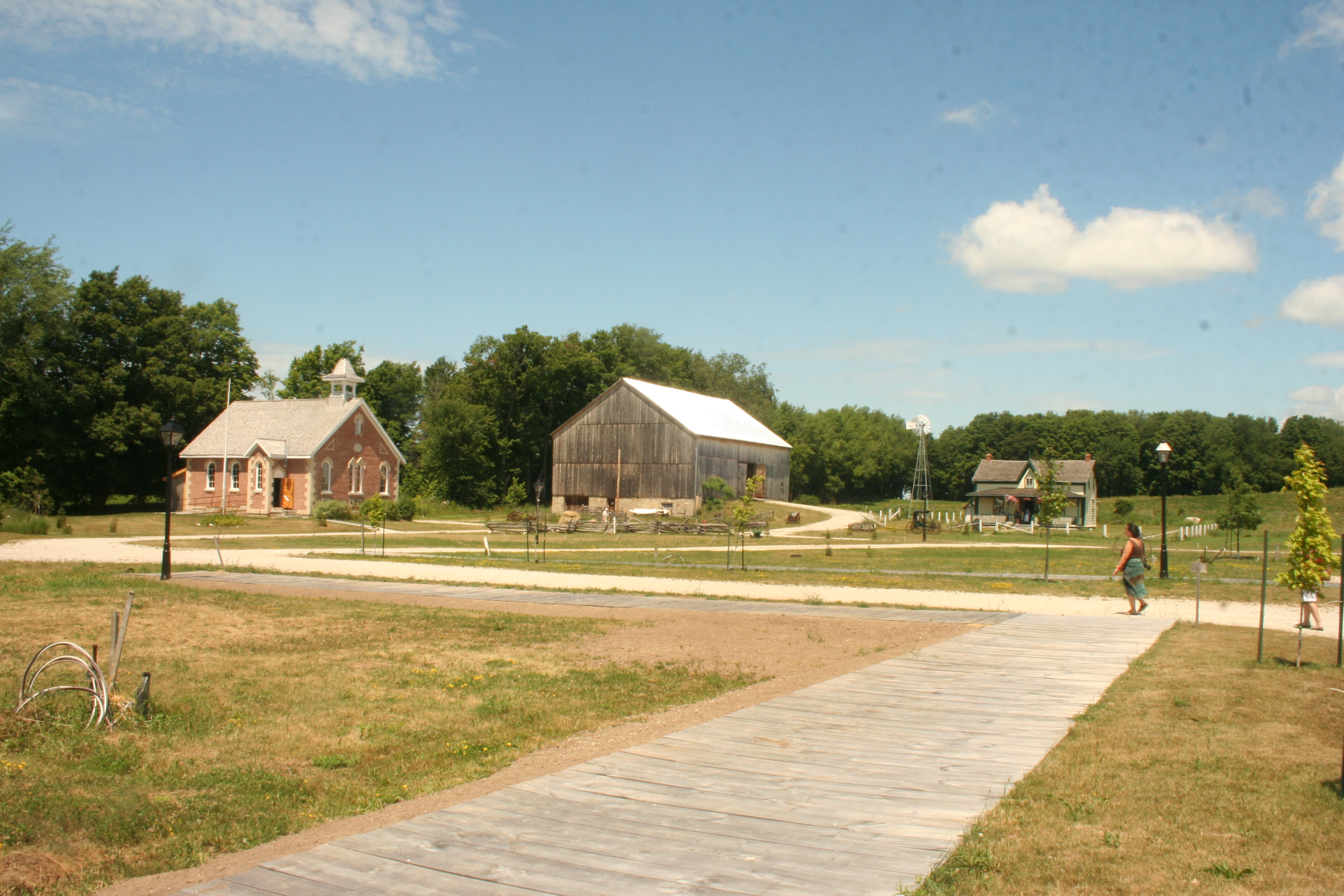
- Established: 1955
- Location: Georgian Bluffs, Ontario
- Coordinates: 44.52215°N 80.94113°W
- Type: County Museum and County Archives
- Website: www.greyroots.com

Grey Roots Museum and Archives began as a County museum in 1955. Since then it has taken a large role in preserving the history and promoting the heritage of Grey County.

The current facility is located just south of Owen Sound on Grey Road 18. It was opened in 2004, constructed from materials that characterize the development of the county. The building houses the County museum, archives, and tourism offices. There is also Moreston Heritage Village adjacent to the main building, with volunteers and buildings portraying the development of Grey County from the 1850s to the 1920s.

== History ==
The Museum Committee began to borrow artefacts for temporary exhibits in 1955, but a permanent museum was founded in 1959 with the help of the Grey County Historical Art Society as an art gallery and museum. A more spacious arrangement was made in 1967 with the help of the city of Owen Sound, and the new Grey County-Owen Sound Centennial Museum was opened. The museum would grow at this site, developing its own heritage village, until 2004. The Grey County Archives was established in 2000 in the former Glenelg municipal building in the Municipality of West Grey. As the Grey County Museum and the Grey County Archives both faced a shortage of space to expand, new property was acquired off Grey Rd 18, and both museum and archives were moved to this site. Six of the buildings from the Heritage Village were moved to the new site, with plans for a total of twenty buildings upon completion.

== Logo ==
The logo is a multi-coloured sheaf, each colour representing a different element of Grey County. The green symbol takes the outline of a tree, representing forestry. The grey symbol represents the rock wall of the escarpment. The red symbol represents fireworks, or celebration of people. The yellow represents grain, because of Grey County's agricultural heritage, and the blue represents water, such as Grey County's many waterfalls.

== Facility and Village ==
The Grey Roots building is based on a natural theme, as is the logo and main gallery. Construction materials include concrete, stone, maples and cedar wood, all significant materials in the economic development of Grey County. The building incorporates all elements of the logo, including a limestone exterior, a timber framed entrance reminiscent of a Grey County barn, and even a small waterfall in the foyer.

The Moreston Heritage Village, located just beside the main building, spans a time period from the 1850s to the 1920s. There is an 1850s Log Cabin and Blacksmith Shop, as well as an 1880s Log House and a 1920s Farmhouse, Bluewater Garage, George Rice Blacksmith Shop, Timberframe Barn, Good Cheer Bandstand and Schoolhouse, with future plans for twenty buildings. The village is named Moreston after the generous donation of the 20-acre (81,000 m^{2}) property by Barry More and the More family, and is open in the summer months and for certain school programs and special events throughout the year.

== Collections ==
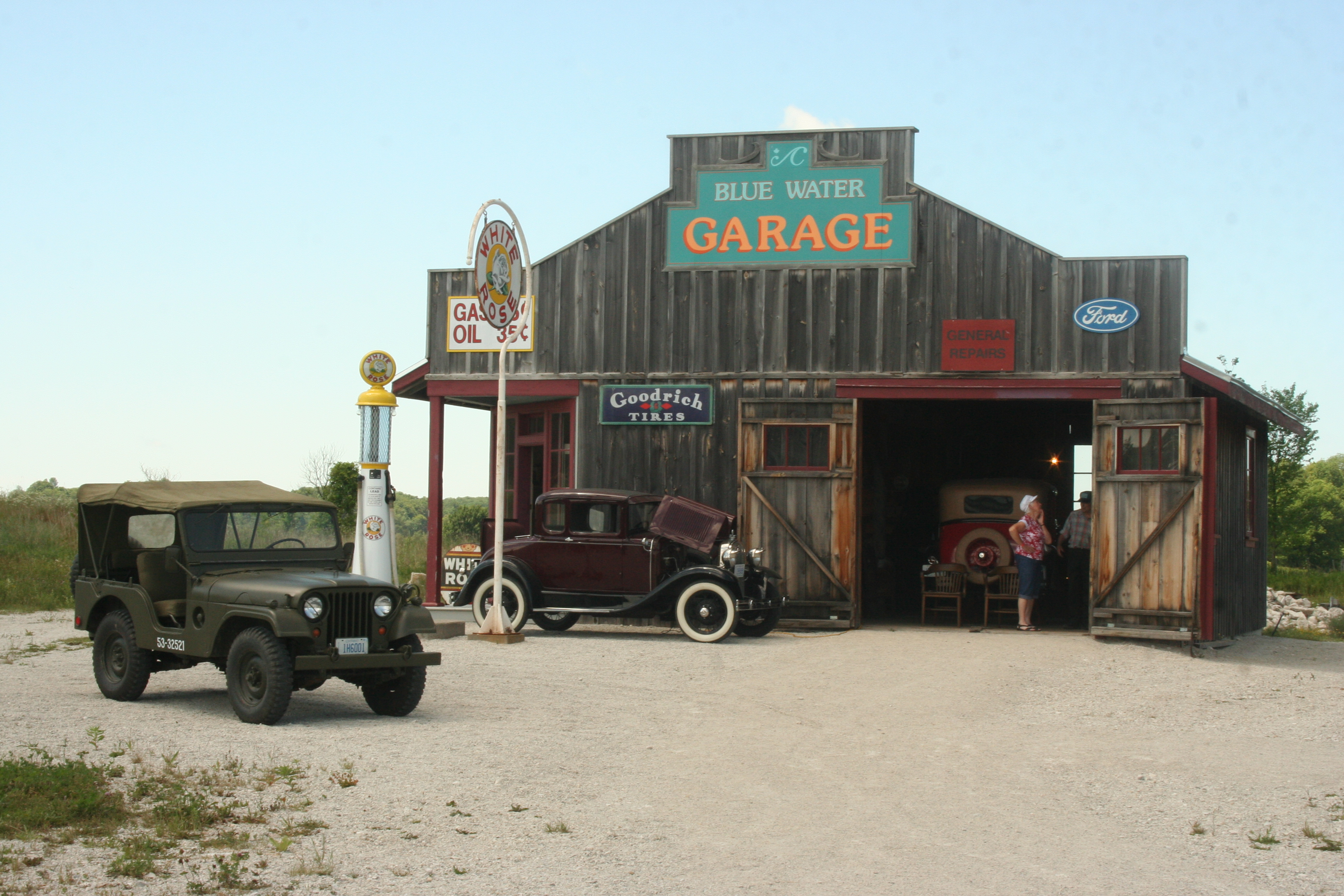
Moreston Heritage Village

The Museum has been collecting artefacts relevant to the historical and cultural development of the County since 1955, with artefacts ranging from pre-settlement to present time. Each artefact in the collection is accessioned, digitized (digitally photographed), cleaned, catalogued and housed according to current Canadian Museum Standards. As per most Canadian museums, only a fraction of the collection is exhibited at one time, and artefacts rotate onto exhibition depending on the exhibition schedule and often compliment larger, rented exhibits. The majority of the exhibited items can befound in the Moreston Heritage Village buildings which are open seasonally. The collection and active accessioning of artefacts centres on telling the stories of Grey County through identified interpretive themes, which are: First Nations History, Pre- and Post-European contact, Pioneers and Early Settlers (1830s to 1855), Farm Life and Agriculture, Industrial Development, Commercial Development, Military History, Transportation and Noteworthy Names - Who Are We? Grey Roots Museum and Archives also has a separate education/hands-on collection which consists of items that can be used for teaching school groups and speciality groups. This collection is made up of items that are surplus to the collection, have little or unknown provenance, are not specifically related to Grey County or are purpose-bought. The vast majority of the museum's collection are donated by current or past residents or descendants of Grey County residents, but the museum also, from time to time, purchases items for its collection which meet its collecting mandate. The Archives collection contains over 500 collections, including land abstracts, municipal records, and private collections. All artefacts and collections are stored in areas with temperature, light, and humidity controls.

== Exhibits ==
Exhibits include the Grey County Gallery, changing travelling exhibits and Grey Roots original exhibits of varying scope from exhibit pods to large scale productions. Another showcases the local heroes of Grey County- including Billy Bishop, Tom Thomson, and Agnes Macphail. There are a number of virtual exhibits, ranging from a focus on Women's Institutes to Black History. These are available on the Grey Roots website.

== Interpretation ==
Grey Roots offers school and children's programs, group tours for both adults and children and many special event days throughout the year; some examples include: Pratie Oaten, Moreston by Candlelight, The Maple Sugar Moon Festival, and the Emancipation Festival Speaker's Forum.

== Affiliations ==
The Museum is affiliated with: CMA, CHIN, and Virtual Museum of Canada.
