= Mount Bishop (Elk Range) =

Mountain in Alberta and British Columbia, Canada

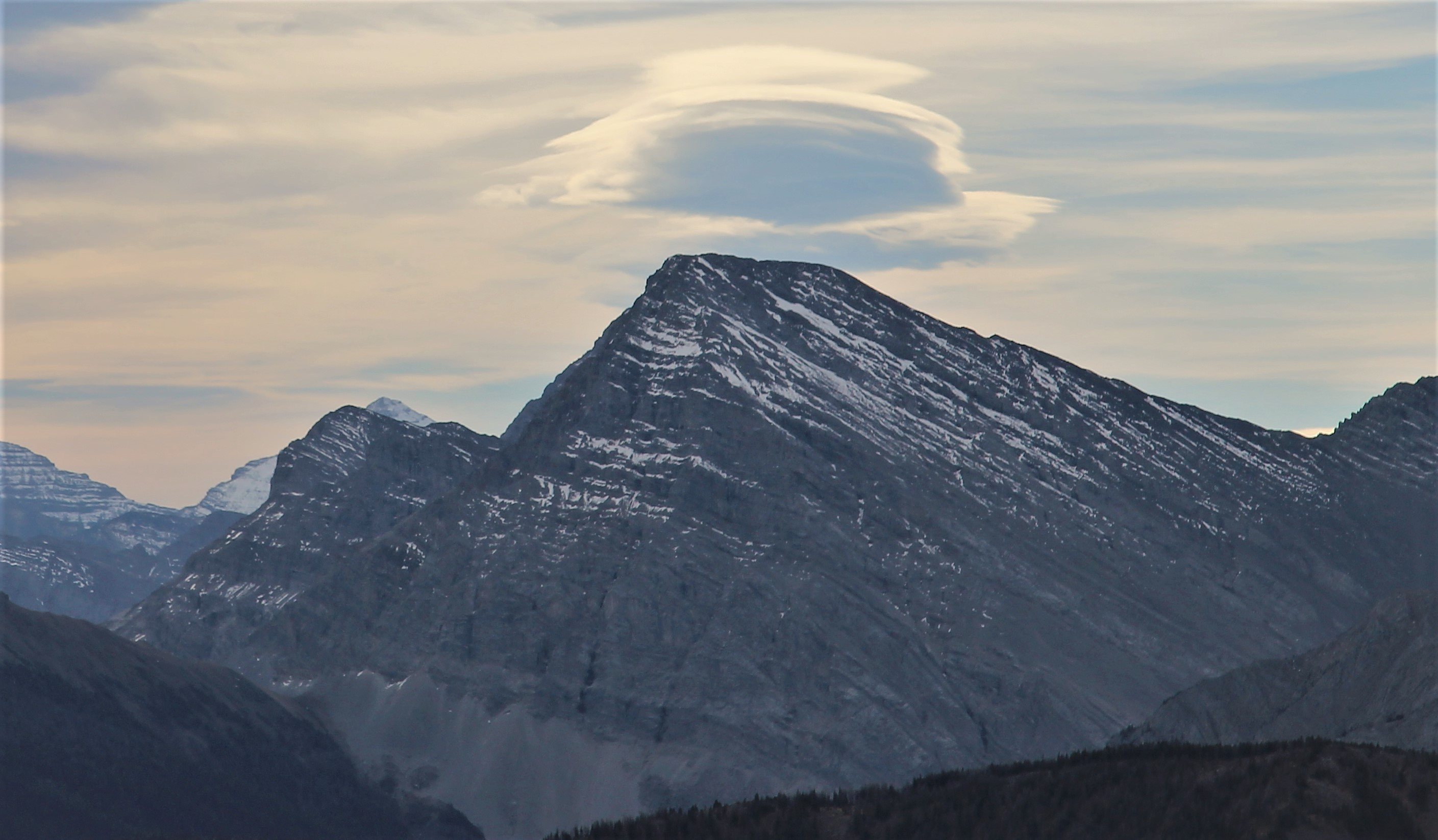
- North aspect

Highest point
- Elevation: 2,850 m (9,350 ft)
- Prominence: 359 m (1,178 ft)
- Listing: Mountains of Alberta; Mountains of British Columbia
- Coordinates: 50°26′24″N 114°52′35″W

Geography
- Location within Alberta Location within British Columbia Location within Canada
- Country: Canada
- Provinces: Alberta and British Columbia
- Parent range: Elk Range
- Topo map: NTS 82J7 Mount Head

Mount Bishop is a mountain named in 1918 after W.A. "Billy" Bishop VC who was a Colonel and a Canadian fighter pilot awarded the Victoria Cross during World War I. It is located in the Elk Range of the Canadian Rockies and sits on the Continental Divide, which forms the British Columbia-Alberta border in this area.

== See also ==
- List of peaks on the Alberta–British Columbia border
