= Royal Canadian Air Force Association =

- Abbreviation: RCAFA
- Formation: 1948
- Type: Not-for-profit organization with royal patronage
- Legal status: Active
- Purpose: Community service organization of Royal Canadian Air Force (RCAF) veterans and aviation enthusiasts
- Headquarters: Ottawa, Ontario, Canada
- Region served: Canada
- Official language: English, French
- Website: rcafassociation.ca

The Royal Canadian Air Force Association (RCAFA), formerly the Air Force Association of Canada, is a not-for-profit community service organization of Royal Canadian Air Force (RCAF) veterans, veterans of Air Command, veterans of the post-2011 name change (to RCAF), veterans of army and naval aviation, and aviation enthusiasts. The RCAFA's main goals are to advocate for a well-equipped, well-trained, well-prepared air force for Canada; motivate young Canadians to develop an interest in an aerospace (civil or military) career; and to inform new generations of Canadians about the importance and history of their country's air force. The association is also active in advocating for veterans rights, with community service, and with promoting aviation heritage and youth projects, especially those supporting the Royal Canadian Air Cadets.

== History ==
The Royal Canadian Air Force Association was formed by a government order-in-council in May 1948. This organization advocated on behalf of the Royal Canadian Air Force and was a means of connecting air force veterans who were members of air force clubs, squadron organizations and air force reunion groups. Postwar, there was also a perceived need to keep track of skilled airmen and airwomen who were active during the Second World War. During the Cold War the RCAFA was able to locate and facilitate the re-recruiting of many aircrew and ground crew for active service during Korean War and for NATO duty. The RCAFA also supported community endeavours and groups such as the Royal Canadian Air Cadets, and published Wings magazine, which focused on Canadian military aviation history.

With the unification of the Canadian Forces in 1968, the RCAF ceased to exist; Canadian air force capabilities were subsumed by Mobile Command, Maritime Command, Air Defence Command and Air Transport Command. This new structure proved ineffective, leading air force senior leaders to seek the reinstatement of a true air force command organization. Eventually the Canadian Forces Air Command was formed in September 1975. Now, the RCAF Association found it necessary to meet the needs of air force veterans who had no affiliation with an organization named RCAF. The Commander of Air Command questioned the relevance of an organization that continued to refer to the name of a former service that no longer existed (RCAF). To become more relevant, the association's name was changed to the Air Force Association of Canada in 1994. Following the return of the name Royal Canadian Air Force to replace Air Command in 2011, the association voted to change its name back to the Royal Canadian Air Force Association in 2012. The executive director, Dean Black, made it clear that the association needed to unite Canadian air force veterans and proposed the name Canadian Air Force Association. He also explained that since the Queen is the patron, the prefix Royal should be used, making the full name Royal Canadian Air Force Association.

The RCAF Association advocates and supports Canadian civil as well as military aviation. The association sponsors air cadet squadrons, provides fellowship through the air force clubs, or "wings", and supports Ident-a-Kid - a program that is concerned with child safety. The association's regalia includes distinctive two-tone blue wedge caps and Air Force tartan neck ties. The association's official publication Wings magazine was renamed Airforce in 1978. The magazine is offered free to members of the association.

== See also ==
- History of the Royal Canadian Air Force
