= Canada's Air Defence =

- DVD cover
- Directed by: John Howe
- Written by: John Howe
- Produced by: Nicholas Balla
- Narrated by: S/L Andrew "Andy" Vincent
- Cinematography: Lorne C. Batchelor; Jean Roy; Peter Kelly
- Edited by: Douglas Tunstell
- Music by: Robert Fleming
- Production company: National Film Board of Canada
- Distributed by: National Film Board of Canada
- Release date: 1957
- Running time: 33 minutes, 52 seconds
- Country: Canada
- Language: English

Canada's Air Defence is a 33-minute 1957 Canadian documentary film produced by the National Film Board of Canada (NFB) for the Royal Canadian Air Force (RCAF). The film depicts the role of air defence over Canada and the United States by following the training and operational exercises of a RCAF squadron.

== Synopsis ==
In 1956, No. 433 "Porcupine" RCAF Squadron flies the Avro Canada CF-100 Canuck all-weather interceptor aircraft. The squadron is based at CFB North Bay, Ontario, and is responsible for an area that includes the immediate region and the Arctic. On a deployment to CFB Cold Lake, Alberta, where training for RCAF operational units takes place, experienced flight crews and newcomers in the squadron learn how to be more effective as a team. The work of the ground control and radar units that support the squadron are highlighted in a combat readiness exercise.

During the Cold War, the Soviet threat of nuclear attack on North America was countered by both the United States and Canada. Air defence was based on radar stations, staffed with American and Canadian personnel, set up in three systems across Canada to detect incoming Soviet bombers. The further operational aspects of air defence in North America that even included ground observers called the RCAF Ground Observer Corps, was detailed. (Note: The Ground Observer Corps (GObC) of observation posts with over 50,000 volunteers provided aircraft sightings from 1952-1964.)

== Production ==
Live firing of CF-100 wingtip rocket tubes took place at the CFB Cold Lake, Alberta, firing range.

Typical of the NFB's series of short training films for the RCAF, Canada's Air Defence relied heavily on military assistance in obtaining footage. The film incorporated footage shot in 1956 at bases where No. 433 All-Weather (Fighter) Squadron operated. After the Second World War, the squadron, originally a heavy bomber squadron in Europe, reformed as a fighter squadron at Cold Lake, Alberta, on November 15, 1954. A move to North Bay, Ontario, came in October 1955, where the squadron flew CF-100 aircraft on North American air defence until being disbanded on August 1, 1961.

The aerial sequences included footage shot from accompanying CF-100s and featured five-plane formation flying. Additional footage of rocket firing at the CFB Cold Lake, Alberta, firing range was incorporated into the story of air defence interceptions. A Royal Air Force Vickers Valiant bomber is also briefly seen in the film.

== Reception ==
Canada's Air Defence was primarily a military training film, produced as part of the NFB's newsreel programs. Each film in NFB's catalogue was made available on 16 mm, to schools, libraries and air cadet units. They were also made available to film libraries operated by university and provincial authorities. Canada's Air Defence was later edited into R.C.A.F. Air Defence Command (1957).

Although available from the National Film Board either online or as a DVD, Canada's Air Defence is now largely forgotten. A recent analysis emphasized the historical value of the film. "From a strictly cinematic viewpoint, it must be admitted that its age is showing. The style of the film with its wooden 'acting' and patriotic theme is in keeping with its generation. That is some ways what makes it so interesting, it's a time capsule from the past."
