= Wasp Wings =

- DVD cover
- Music by: F/L Bernard Yuffy; S/L Martin Boundy conducting the RCAF Overseas Band
- Production company: National Film Board of Canada
- Distributed by: Columbia Pictures of Canada
- Release date: 1945
- Running time: 42 minutes, 12 seconds
- Country: Canada
- Language: English

Wasp Wings is a 42-minute 1945 Canadian documentary film made by the Royal Canadian Air Force (RCAF) Overseas Film Unit and the National Film Board of Canada (NFB). The film takes its name from the colourful markings known as invasion stripes that were painted on Supermarine Spitfire fighter aircraft on D-Day, making them look like "angry wasps".

== Synopsis ==
The 2TAF quickly established three airfields on the Normandy coast.

Starting in England in 1943, Royal Canadian Air Force Spitfire fighter wings in the RAF Second Tactical Air Force (2TAF) were preparing for deployment to overseas bases. Using the fast and agile Spitfire in a number of different marks, the 2TAF aircraft provided close air support, as well as engaging the Luftwaffe in aerial combat. The Spitfire wings "played an essential part in a swift-moving, deadly striking air force." The success of the RCAF Spitfire units was due to both aircrews and ground crews that not only set up the tactical airfields, but kept the aircraft serviced. The first group set up in Italy, then other wings were attached to the units committed to the Normandy campaign, with temporary bases established in France, Belgium, the Netherlands and Germany from 1944 to 1945. In the last months of the Second World War, 2TAF bagin to relax as their missions came to an end.

== Production ==
Typical of the NFB's wartime series of documentary short films, Wasp Wings relied heavily on military assistance in obtaining footage at operational bases. The film was based on the 2nd Tactical Ar Force 126, 127, and 144 Wings and was compiled from film shot from 1943–1945. The "men with flying in their blood" who were featured in Wasp Wings included Canadian Spitfire aces "Buzz" Beurling, Dal Russel, Keith Hodson, Robert Wendell "Buck" McNair, and Lloyd Chadburn. Aerial combat sequences utilized actual gun camera footage.

== Reception ==
As part of the NFB's newsreel programs, Wasp Wings was produced for the theatrical market. Each film was shown over a six-month period as part of the shorts or newsreel segments in approximately 800 theatres across Canada. The NFB had an arrangement with Famous Players theatres to ensure that Canadians from coast to coast could see them, with further distribution by Columbia Pictures.

After the six-month theatrical tour ended, individual films were made available on 16 mm to schools, libraries, churches, and factories, extending the life of these films for another year or two. They were also made available to film libraries operated by university and provincial authorities. Although available from the National Film Board either online or as a DVD, Wasp Wings is now largely forgotten.

Historian Malek Khouri analyzed the role of the NFB wartime documentaries, with Wasp Wings characterized as an example of a topic that went beyond a simple depiction of events, yet did not fit the typical definition of a propaganda film. "During the early years of the NFB, its creative output was largely informed by the turbulent political and social climate the world was facing. World War II, Communism, unemployment, the role of labour unions, and working conditions were all subjects featured by the NFB during the period from 1939 to 1946. In Filming Politics, author Malek Khouri explores the work of the NFB during this period and argues that the political discourse of the films produced by this institution offered a counter-hegemonic portrayal of working class people and presented them as agents of social change."

Khouri noted the Spitfire designers, pilots, and ground crew in Wasp Wings were depicted as examples of the triumph of technology and a "new-found fascination" with technological advances in winning the war.
