= Westhill High School =

Westhill High School may refer to:

- Westhill High School (Connecticut) in Stamford, Connecticut, US
- Westhill Senior High School in Syracuse, New York, US
- Westhill Institute in Mexico City
- Westhill Academy in Westhill, Scotland, UK
- West Hill School in Stalybridge, England, UK
- West Hill High School in Montreal, Quebec, Canada
- West Hill Secondary School in Owen Sound, Ontario, Canada
- West Hill Collegiate Institute in Toronto, Ontario, Canada
