= Shell Busey =

Canadian broadcaster (1942–2026)

Shell Busey (November 25, 1942 – October 27, 2026) was a Canadian radio and television personality and home improvement expert. He was the host of the Home Discovery Show until July 2011, a talk radio show on the Corus Radio Network. He was also the creator of the HouseSmart Home Services Referral Network, a conglomerate of over 170 different trades, home services and home products available across Canada. In addition to being a guest on other radio shows, Busey made numerous public appearances at home shows, seminars and charity events.

Shell Busey died on October 27, 2026, at the age of 83. At the time of his death, Shell and his wife, Frankie, lived in Surrey, British Columbia.

== Early life ==
Shell Emerson Busey was born in Owen Sound, Ontario on November 25, 1942. He was the third of five children. Busey's father Emerson worked for many years for the now-demolished Kennedy Foundry in Owen Sound, and was credited with inventing the “Shaper Plane”, a machine that would shave down large ship propellers to their desired final shapes. Emerson later became a tool and die maker for RCA Victor.

Shell Busey didn't care much for schoolwork as a young man; his real passion was in carpentry and mechanics. As a youth Busey delivered The Globe and Mail in the morning and The Toronto Star and Owen Sound's local Sun Times in the evening on his bicycle. Busey moved on from paper delivery to delivering prescription drugs for Bill Murphy's Drug Store in Owen Sound.

At the age of 13, Busey entered the Industrial Program at Owen Sound Collegiate and Vocational Institute, where he took instruction in cabinetry, electrical, plumbing, motor mechanics and drafting. One of his teachers, Bill Graham, helped Busey get a job as a management trainee for Beaver Lumber.

== Early career ==
In 1961, at age 18, Busey began work as a stock boy at Beaver Lumber in Owen Sound. He eventually earned himself a sales desk position. Beaver Lumber's store manager, Roy Kennedy, recommended Busey for the Beaver Lumber Management Training program. Busey attended the program in Oakville, attaining his management certificate in 1965, and later that year, at the age of 22, he assumed the role of assistant manager at Beaver Lumber in Barrie, Ontario.

After less than a year, Busey received another promotion and, with his wife Frankie, moved to Orangeville, where he assumed the role of store manager—at age 23, the youngest in the entire Beaver Lumber chain. From 1968 to 1974, Busey transferred to several Beaver Lumber locations across the province from Sault Ste. Marie to Windsor to Oakville, moving from manager to supervisor.

In 1974 Shell Busey and his young family moved to British Columbia where Busey would manage the western Canada division of Saveway Stores. At the time, Saveway was a brand new cash-and-carry arm of the Beaver Lumber Group, and Busey was supervising the changeover of four locations: Ladner, Langley, Burnaby and Surrey. In addition, Busey was responsible for the supervision of Beaver Lumber stores in Prince George, Fort St. John, Chetwynd, Vanderhoof, Whitehorse and the Yukon.

Busey left Beaver Lumber in 1975 to take on a position as merchandise manager for Independent Retail Lumber Yard Building Supplies. In 1976, upon the request of Beaver Lumber, Busey travelled to Whitehorse to set up the first Beaver Lumber franchise in the Yukon. Upon his return to Delta, B.C., became a consultant to the Surrey Co-op in Cloverdale.

In 1977, Busey purchased a Windsor Plywood franchise in Delta, with his wife Frankie. Busey and his wife turned the once struggling franchise into an award-winning successful business. Less than two years later Busey opened a satellite location on Scott Road in Surrey, which he called Ye Olde Hardware Store. The business didn't do as well as he had hoped and he sold the store in 1980. Busey and Frankie expanded their original Windsor Plywood store and, in 1981, purchased a second franchise in Coquitlam, B.C. In the spring of 1983 the Buseys decided to leave the Windsor Plywood franchise and operate independently, first as Mr. Build Centre, and eventually changing the name to Build-it Centre.

== Radio and television career ==
In 1983 Busey also began hosting his own home improvement radio program called The Build-It Show on CJOR, a talk radio station in Vancouver. The radio program became more popular than he had imagined, and eventually CJOR set up a small studio in Busey's office at the Build-It Centre in Delta. Busey would host the show and serve customers during the commercial breaks.

Busey sold the Coquitlam Build-It Centre in 1985, and the location in Delta in 1987. His career as a radio personality continued with CJOR, until he was approached by a Canadian FM network called CKO, which would broadcast The Build-It Show right across Canada. However, the CKO station struggled to survive. Busey returned to CJOR until the station changed its format to rock radio.

=== BC Hydro PowerSmart/CKNW ===
By the late 1980s, Busey was well known for his radio shows throughout most of western Canada. In 1988 BC Hydro asked Busey to become the spokesperson for their new PowerSmart program, requesting that he host a radio program encouraging the people of British Columbia to become more energy-conscious. Because they wanted province-wide exposure for the program, BC Hydro allied with CKNW in Vancouver, which had the means through their subsidiary Western Information Network (WIN) — the first privately owned satellite-based radio network in Canada. Busey made his first foray into network radio across B.C. with the BC Hydro Home Ideas Show, a call-in home renovation program.

The Home Ideas Show gave Busey the opportunity to see just about every corner of B.C. when he hit the road with the PowerSmart Tour. Busey would broadcast his radio show via satellite from the small towns he visited, educating people to become more energy-conscious. After his 10-year contract with BC Hydro came to an end, Cloverdale Paint became the new sponsor for Busey's radio program, which was renamed the Home Discovery Show.

=== The Home Discovery Show ===
On the show, Shell could often be heard exclaiming "it's just that easy", which also became a title for one of his books. Shell Busey was replaced in early July 2011 by hosts Ian Power and Steve Seaborn. The Home Discovery Show was more popular than ever, and was heard live on Saturday and Sunday mornings in nearly every major-market radio station in Canada between B.C. and Ontario. In the spring of 2008 Busey also created TheHouseSmart.com Show, which airs Saturday mornings at 5 a.m. (Pacific Standard Time), focusing on the questions posed via emails that he received on a weekly basis.

=== Home Check ===
In 1994 BCTV asked Busey to be a regular guest on the Saturday Morning News program. In early 1995 Busey was offered his own home improvement series through CHEK-TV in Victoria. The first Home Check episode aired in September 1995. To date, 118 episodes have been taped and still air today on stations all over Canada, Japan, the Netherlands, Germany and South Korea.

== Other work ==
=== Delta Councillor ===
In 1985 Busey was approached to run for council in Delta, where he and his family lived at the time. He was elected December 2, 1985 for a two-year term, and re-elected in December 1987 for another three years.

== Media and public appearances ==
Busey was a guest judge on the HGTV reality show Handyman Superstar Challenge from 2007 to 2009.

He contributed regular columns to newspaper and magazine publications across Canada, including the Vancouver Province Sunday Homes, the Winnipeg Canstar Weeklies, Homebase Media's Renovations magazine throughout Western Canada, Canadian Homestead Magazine, Cottage Magazine, Green Home Magazine and Coastlines Magazine. Book... "Shell Busey Answers the 101 most asked home improvement Questions" 1 Volume 1994, fourth reprint 1995....

He also made regular guest appearances on the Vancouver Studio 4 with Fanny Kiefer on Shaw TV and on CKNW’s Bill Good Show on the Corus Radio Network, and was also a featured guest speaker at major home shows across Western Canada.
