= John Cozens =

John Cozens may refer to:

- John Robert Cozens (1752–1797), British draftsman and painter
- John Cozens (musician) (1906–1999), Canadian arts administrator, arranger, choir conductor, and tenor
- John Cozens (footballer) (born 1946), former English footballer
