= Owen Sound Collegiate and Vocational Institute =

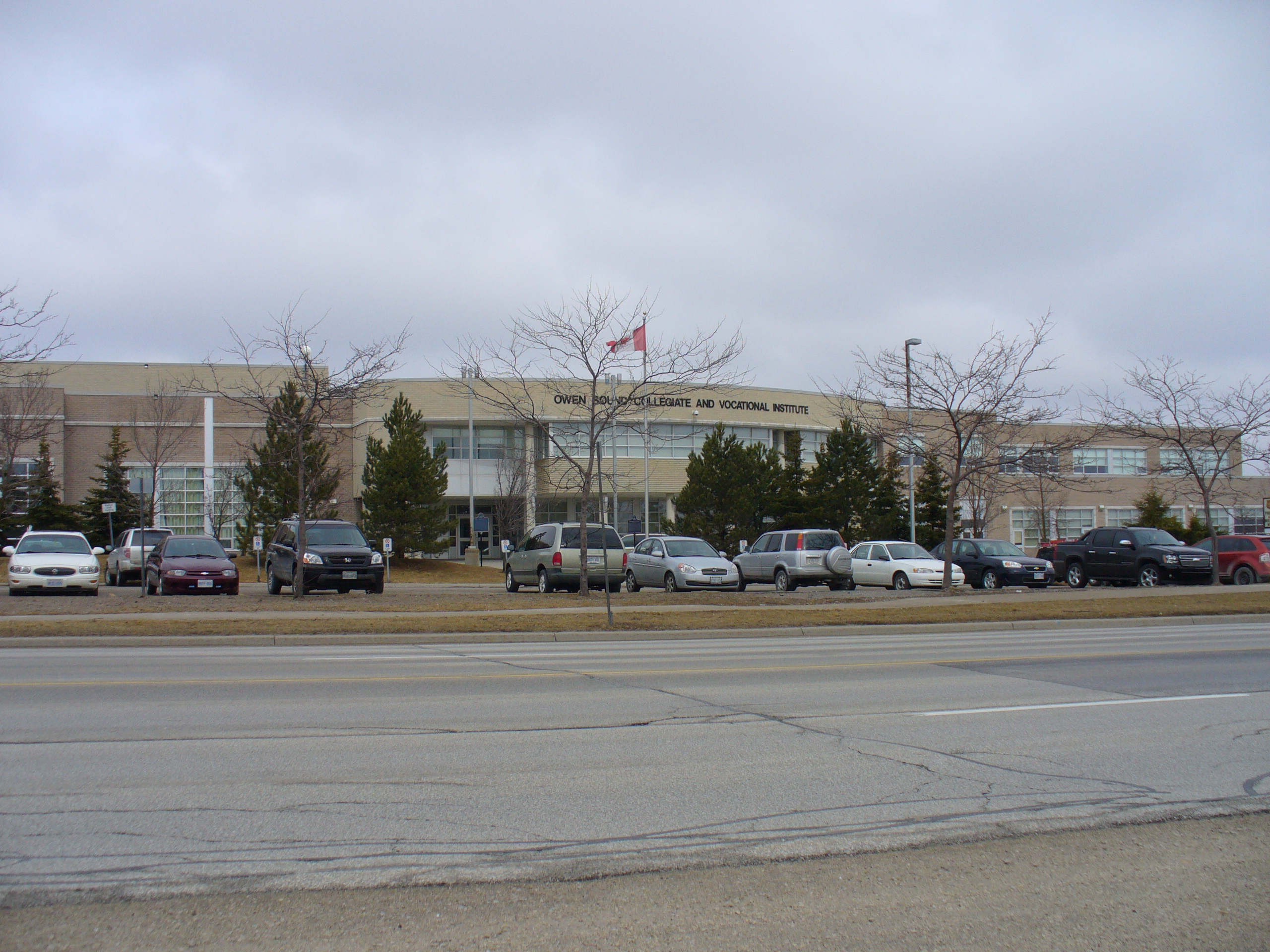

Location
- 1550, 8th Street East; Owen Sound, Ontario, N4K 0A2; Canada; 44.56778°N 80.91681°W

Information
- Motto: Dum Vivimus Vivamus (While We Live, Let Us Live)
- Established: 1856
- Closed: 2016
- School board: Bluewater District School Board

Owen Sound Collegiate and Vocational Institute (OSCVI), located in Owen Sound, Ontario, Canada, was one of the oldest schools in Canada having been founded in 1856 and in the late 1880s and early 1890s was the most academically successful school in Ontario. The school also boasted a number of famous alumni.

== History ==
Up until the 1850s Owen Sound had little in the way of formal education. At that time, the colonial government of Upper Canada had legislated the creation of grammar schools, which in essence were secondary schools, primary schools being known as common schools. In 1856 Grey County recognised the need for such a grammar school and the construction of a building to house both the grammar and common school was begun. Whilst this was being constructed on 10th Street West, ten students were taught in a leased building on 3rd Avenue East in 1856. The school dates its inception to that point. However, problems arose with the facility and new school was closed at the end of 1856 for a two-year period. In 1858 a new school building was erected on 4th Avenue East on a site now occupied by the now Strathcona Apartments (formerly Strathcona Senior Public School c. 1930s). This building housed the Owen Sound High School. In 1886 it was renamed the Owen Sound Collegiate Institute. Under this new guise from 1887 to 1892 the school placed first in the provincial department examinations. Such was the school's academic achievement and dominance in this period that it has been described as one of a handful of outstanding collegiates in the 1880s and 1890s in Canada. In part its success was put down to civic pride and public investment in modern and uncommon facilities such as a science laboratory. The building was expanded in 1907.

In 1924 a new vocational wing was built, and the school was renamed Owen Sound Collegiate and Vocational Institute (OSCVI). By 1951 the original building was in poor condition, and the third floor assembly hall had actually been condemned because of the fire hazard. The City Council had turned down three requests for space at Victoria Park to build a new school, and the issue finally went to a plebiscite in December 1951. The vote was overwhelmingly against building a new school on Victoria Park. Less than six months later the issue was dramatically decided when the older part of the school was destroyed by a spectacular blaze (May 1952). The vocational wing was repaired and the rest of the school was rebuilt on the same site, with a further addition completed in 1970. In 1997 construction began on a new site on 8th Street East, and this was opened in the autumn of 1999. At the end of the 2015-2016 school year OSCVI was amalgamated with West Hill Secondary School to form Owen Sound District Secondary School while the physical building was converted into an elementary school (East Ridge Community School).

Over the years the school played host to many community events and activities. It was the main performance space for local amateur theatre troupe, the Owen Sound Little Theatre, and is still the main performance venue and rehearsal space for the Georgian Bay Symphony.

== Alumni ==
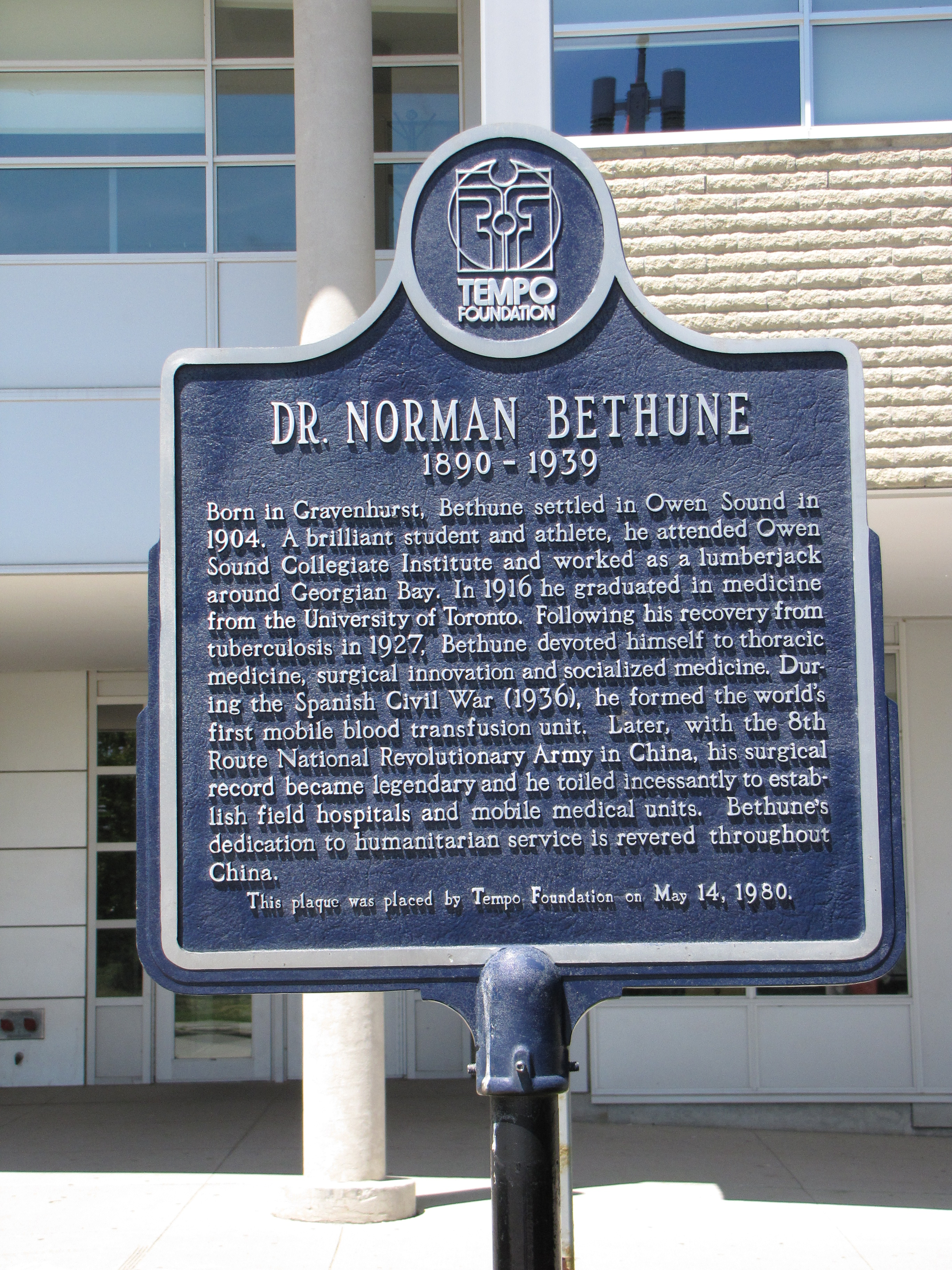
A memorial plaque to Norman Bethune, installed at the school in 1980

- Billy Bishop
- Norman Bethune
- Shell Busey
- William Wilfred Campbell
- Robert Hanbidge
- Joy Laking
- Frederick Donald MacKenzie
- Agnes Macphail
- Bill Murdoch
- Victor Porteous
- Patrick J. Keeling

== See also ==
- List of high schools in Ontario
