= West Hill Secondary School =

Canadian secondary school

Owen Sound Secondary School

Location
- 750 9th Street West; Owen Sound, Ontario, N4K 3P6; Canada; 44.5650°N 80.9572°W

Information
- Motto: Sto Pro Veritate (I Stand For Truth)
- Established: 1960
- Closed: 2016
- School board: Bluewater District School Board
- Colour: Double blue
- Team name: Raiders

West Hill Secondary School (WHSS) was a high school located in Owen Sound, Ontario, Canada. Built in 1960, the school joined another existing secondary institution in the city - Owen Sound Collegiate and Vocational Institute (OSCVI). Serving the community for over half a century, the school closed in 2016 and amalgamated with OSCVI. The building is now used for the current Owen Sound high school, Owen Sound District Secondary School.

== History ==
Plans to build a new secondary school in Owen Sound began in 1947, with the creation of an expansion program by the Ontario Board of Education. The job of designing the school was given to the architecture firm Jackson, Ypes and Associates of Willowdale, Ontario.

The location of the new school, in a field across from the West Rocks Conservation Area, had once served as pastures for farmers on the west side of Owen Sound. The datestone for the building was laid on June 1, 1960. West Hill was opened to students in September of the same year, with Gordon H. Bailey serving as the first principal.

== Amalgamation ==
The Bluewater Accommodation Review Committee (ARC) began assessing the financial situations of schools in Grey and Bruce counties as early as September 2015.

At a meeting in February 2016, the Bluewater District School Board recommended the consolidation of the two Owen Sound high schools under their jurisdiction - OSCVI and West Hill.

The amalgamation of West Hill and OSCVI was finally approved at a meeting of Bluewater district trustees on April 19, 2016. In September 2016, the new high school, Owen Sound District Secondary School (OSDSS) was opened in the former West Hill building.

== Notable alumni ==
- Cheryl Hickey - television journalist
- Heather Hiscox - news anchor
- Jim Schoenfeld - hockey player and executive
- Vanessa Weight - Singer Songwriter and TikTok star
- Boris Cherniak - Comedy Hypnotist, Keynote Speaker and TV personality

== See also ==
- List of high schools in Ontario
