= Georgian Bay Symphony =

- Orchestra
- Short name: GBS
- Founded: 1972
- Location: Owen Sound, Ontario, Canada
- Website: www.georgianbaysymphony.ca

The award winning Georgian Bay Symphony (GBS) located in Owen Sound, Ontario, Canada, was founded in 1972 by a small group of dedicated area musicians and became a Canadian Registered Charity in 1982. It is considered a significant cultural institution in Owen Sound and area. The GBS is a community orchestra with over 60 volunteer musicians and a core group of professionals under Music Director Jeffrey Pollock. The GBS performs five Main Series concerts at the East Ridge Community School in the 761-seat Owen Sound Collegiate and Vocational Institute Community Auditorium each season. Guest artists have included some of Canada’s best musical talent including Shauna Rolston, Alain Trudel, George Gao, Adrian Anantawan, Richard Raymond, and Jonathan Crow.

== History ==
In 1985, the orchestra played host to a unique on ice live performance with Toller Cranston. In 1990, they hosted a performance of the Moscow Philharmonic Orchestra on a good will tour of Canada. In 2016, the symphony collaborated with Canadian author Roch Carrier to present an orchestral version of The Hockey Sweater, by Canadian composer Abigail Richardson-Schulte.

Over the years, the orchestra has also premiered work by several Canadian composers: F. R. C. Clarke's "Saugeenia" on March 8, 1981, in concert with the Centennial Singers in Port Elgin, Andrew Ager's "Autumn Overture" on October 25, 2003, Kevin Lau's "Sea of Blossoms" on March 3, 2007, "The White Horse" in February 2009, and Luc Martin's "Concerto for Recorder and Double Base" on February 7, 2015. Richard Mascall was the composer-in-residence from 2007 until 2010. While holding this position, he created several works that were premiered by the GBS: "Giizhigoong" commissioned as part of the City of Owen Sound's 150 Anniversary celebrations, "Dream of the Anishnabaek", "Ojibway Songs", "Nanabush and the Giant Beaver", and "Manitoulin". Many of these works have been performed by many other groups, including "Manitoulin" by Vancouver Symphony Orchestra.

In 2022, the orchestra won the Owen Sound Arts & Culture Award for Outstanding Event. In 2017, the orchestra was the recipient of the Vida Peene Award from the Ontario Arts Council and in 2018 won the Outstanding Group category at the Owen Sound Cultural Awards. These are not the first awards for the orchestra. In 2014, the GBS won an Owen Sound Cultural Award in the same category and in 1999, the Symphony was a recipient of the Lieutenant-Governor's Award for the Arts.

The Symphony participates in many community events, including performing the National Anthem before at least one OHL Jr A Owen Sound Attack hockey game each season.

During the pandemic the Georgian Bay Symphony was one of the only community orchestras in Canada to launch a full digital season.

John Barnum retired as music director and conductor of the GBS in 2015, after serving in that role for over two decades. In his final year he was honoured with the Owen Sound Cultural Life Time Achievement Award.

== Conductors ==
- Hermon C. Dilmore (1971–1976)
- Eric Woodward (1976–1979)
- Jim White (1979)
- Jerome Summers (1980–1981)
- Erna Van Daele (1981–1983)
- Kerry Stratton (1983–1989)
- Clyde Mitchell (1990–1993)
- John Barnum (1993–May 2015)
- François Koh (June 2015–December 2022)
- Richard Mascall (January 2023)
- Jeffrey Pollock (2024–present)
