= George Gao (erhu) =

Chinese-born erhu player and composer (born 1967)

George Gao (Chinese: 高韶青; pinyin: Gāo Sháoqīng, born 1967) is a Chinese-born erhu player and composer.

== History ==
Gao was born in 1967, in Shanghai, China. He began studying the erhu at the age of six. In 1982, he won First Prize at the Shanghai Junior Instrumental Soloist Competition and a Silver Medal at the China National Junior Instrumental Soloist Contest. His performance skill exempted him from high school exit exams, and he entered the Shanghai Conservatory of Music. During his stay, he participated in a program to broadcast Chinese language radio from North America. He finished his Bachelor of Arts degree, and graduated in 1988 with honors. He was the first student ever promoted one year early from that school. After graduation, he was invited to the International Orchestra as a solo artist. He founded the pop bands Red Maple Leaf and Snowman in Beijing. In 1989, he was invited to North Korea to host the World Youth Festival and the Arts diploma.

In 1991, he was admitted into The Royal Conservatory of Music and began studying piano and vocals. He also established the Inner Pulse pop band during that year. Two years later, he became the first erhu instructor at the school, established the first erhu syllabus, and organized the first large erhu concert in Canada. In 2005, he was invited to play at the Governor-General's inauguration in Ottawa. He tours the world frequently, performing in entertainment centers such as the United States, Canada, France, Japan, and China.Gao has performed with multiple orchestras as a soloist, including the Toronto Symphony Orchestra, National Arts Centre Orchestra, Edmonton Symphony Orchestra, Georgian Bay Symphony and I Musici de Montréal Chamber Orchestra. His most notable work is on the soundtrack of the television series Earth: Final Conflict. He has also performed with the Canada-based violin group Bowfire.

Gao is still the erhu instructor at the Royal Conservatory of Music. He lives in Toronto, Ontario, Canada with his wife, Jenny Zhang(张海京). He is also the inventor of the shaoqin (韶琴); and erhu with a wider range and specifically used in concert settings.

== Notable awards ==
- 1982:

- First Prize, Shanghai Junior Instrumental Soloist Competition
- Silver Medal, China National Junior Instrumental Soloist Contest

- 1985:

- First Prize, Beijing China National Invitational Erhu Competition
- Two Best Performance Prizes in two categories

- 1999: Recognition Award, 13th World Festival for Young Students. (North Korea)
- 2005: Gemini Award nomination, Best Performance in a TV series. (Canada)

== Composition credits ==
=== Films ===
Gao has composed soundtrack music for feature and documentary films, including:

- Becoming American: The Chinese Experience, three-part PBS documentary, Bill Moyers Productions/Tom Lennon Documentary Group
- Yellow Wedding
- Chinese Chocolate

=== Original compositions ===
- Capriccio for Erhu
- Song of a traveler
- After the rain
- Birds in a foreign land
- Heaven on Earth

=== Adaptations ===
Gao transposed many pieces into concert works for the erhu. Many of his adaptations successfully convey the same virtuosity displayed in the original versions, while adapting for the erhu, an instrument not accustomed to Western classical music. For example, one of the disadvantages the erhu has is only two strings, as opposed to the four-stringed violin. The player must reach an extended amount of notes on a single string to make up for this difference.

- Pablo Sarasate – Carmen Fantasy, Zigeunerweisen
- Massenet – Meditation from Thais
- Saint-Saëns – The Swan
- Bach – Gounod Avi Maria
- Paganini – Moto perpetuo
