= F. R. C. Clarke =

Canadian musician and composer (1931–2009)

Frederick Robert Charles Clarke
- Born: August 7, 1931; Vancouver, British Columbia
- Died: November 18, 2009 (aged 78)
- Occupations: Canadian composer and musician

Frederick Robert Charles Clarke, known largely by his initials F. R. C. Clarke (August 7, 1931 – November 18, 2009) was a Canadian musician and composer who spent most of his musical career in Kingston, Ontario, Canada.

Clarke was born in Vancouver, British Columbia in 1931. He earned the University of Toronto degrees of Bachelor of Music in 1951 and Doctor of Music in 1954. A distinguished Canadian organist, he earned the Royal Canadian College of Organists' prestigious diplomas of Associate and Fellowship by examination. Among his teachers were George Laughlin, Eric Rollinson, Kenneth Ross, Healey Willan, and S. Drummond Wolff. He served as organist-choirmaster for several Toronto-area churches during his time in the city. From 1957–58, he conducted the St. Catharines Civic Orchestra (now the Niagara Symphony Orchestra), before moving to Kingston and taking up the role of organist-choirmaster at Sydenham Street United Church, a role he served from 1958 until his retirement, after which he served as Organist Emeritus. He began teaching music at Queen's University in 1964, and was head of the Music Department (which became the School of Music during his tenure) from 1981–1991.

Clarke's better-known compositions include "Bel and the Dragon" (1954), "Sing a New Song to the Lord" (1960), "Psalm 145" (1966), which won the 1967 CBC prize for choral music, "Festival Te Deum" (1972), and "Reginae" (1991). His was commissioned to write "Saugeenia" performed by the Georgian Bay Symphony and the Centennial Singers in 1981. Clarke also chaired the committee that produced The Hymn Book (1971) shared by the Anglican Church of Canada and the United Church of Canada, contributing several hymn tunes (including Concrete, Sydenham Street, Causa Divina, Tradition, Kingston, Orbis Terrarum and A Blessing) and arrangements. In 1982, Clarke published a biography of Canadian composer Healey Willan.

Clarke died of cancer at his home in Kingston on November 18, 2009 at the age of 78.

== See also ==
- Music of Canada
- List of Canadian composers
