= S. Drummond Wolff =

English organist, choirmaster, composer and music educator

Stanley Drummond Wolff (4 February 1916 – 9 April 2004) was an English organist, choirmaster, composer, and music educator who was primarily active in North America. His compositional output primarily consists of anthems for choir and works for solo organ. In the 1980s he completed and published four volumes of hymns. Many of his compositions have been published by Concordia Publishing House and MorningStar Music Publishers.

== Early life, career, and education in England ==
Born in London, Wolff became a choir soloist at the Savoy Chapel when he was 6 years old. By age 13 he was playing the organ for church services at St Matthew's Oakley Square in London where he held the position of assistant organist. He entered the Royal College of Music (RCM) in 1933 where he was a Kent Scholar. He earned a Bachelor of Music from the RCM in 1937. His teachers at the school included Sir Walter Alcock (organ), Dr. Ernest Bullock (organ), and Charles Herbert Kitson (music composition). While studying at the RCM he won the Royal College of Organists's Limpus Prize.

After graduating from the RCM, the London County Council appointed Wolff as a senior instructor in music where one of his junior students was Madeleine Dring. He also served as the director and conductor of both London's chapter of the Gilbert and Sullivan society and the Clapham Operatic and Orchestral Society. From 1938-1946 he served as the organist and Master of the Music for St Martin-in-the-Fields. During World War II he played actively with the Band of the Grenadier Guards.

== Career in North America ==
Towards the end of World War II, Wolff was the conductor of the Canadian Military Headquarters Choir for their performances in Europe. This connection led to his appointment to the organ and music theory faculty at The Royal Conservatory of Music in Toronto in 1946. He left there in 1948 to join the faculty at the University of Toronto (UT) where he taught alongside Ernest MacMillan and Healey Willan through 1956. Among his notable pupils were F. R. C. Clarke and James Gayfer.

From 1946-1952 Wolff served as the organist and choirmaster at the Metropolitan United Church (MUC) in Toronto. He composed several anthems for the MUC's choir, 12 of which were published together under the title Metropolitan Series of Choral Music in 1946. He also published two solo organ works around this time: Prelude on Greensleeves (1946) and Festival Fanfare (1950). In 1951 he co-founded the Orpheus Choir of Toronto with John Cozens. From 1952-1956 he was organist and conductor of The Cathedral Singers at the Christ Church Cathedral in Montreal. He also served as the director of the Bank of Montreal Choral Society and appeared as a guest conductor with the Montreal Symphony Orchestra.

After a brief return to the United Kingdom in 1956-1959 during which time he was employed by the London County Council as Head of Music at Tulse Hill School in south London (also composing the music for the school song), Wolff became the organist at the Bermuda Cathedral in 1959. He remained there for roughly three years, during which time he founded and conducted the Bermuda Oratorio Society and hosted radio programs of classical music for Bermuda Radio. In 1962 he joined the music faculty of the College of Marin in Kentfield, California where he taught for the next 10 years.

== Later life and career ==
In 1972 Wolff moved back to his native country, settling in Eastbourne where he taught music and occasionally worked as a conductor and organist until 1981. From 1981-1994 he lived and worked in Seattle, Washington in the United States. He afterwards lived in retirement in San Diego, California where he died at the age of 88 in 2004.
