= Inglis Falls =

Coordinates: 44°31′35″N 80°56′03″W

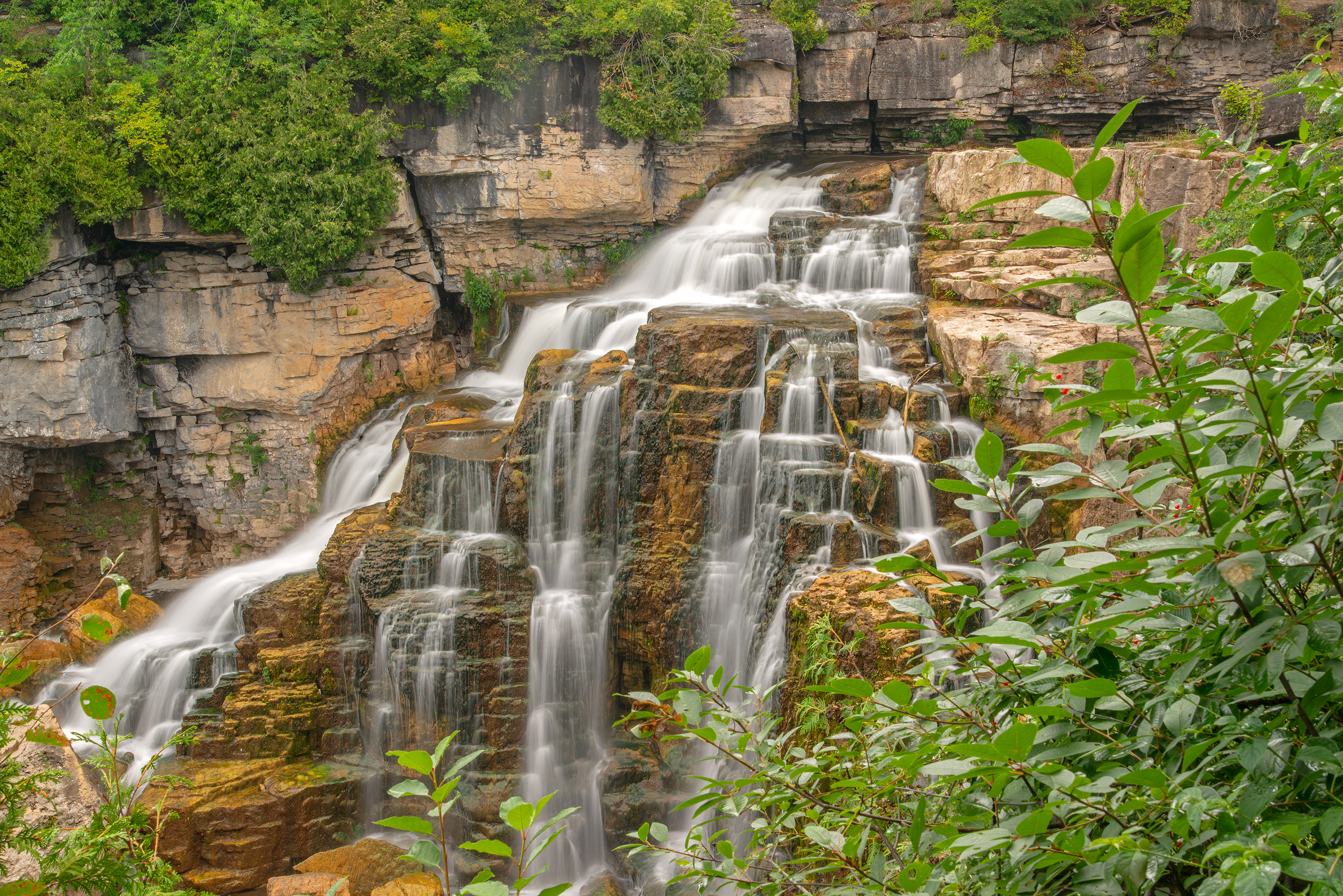
A large section of Inglis Falls, mid-summer 2018

One of three waterfalls that surround the city of Owen Sound, Ontario, Canada, Inglis Falls is the largest and most impressive. It is also the most visited.

Situated in the heart of the 200-hectare Inglis Falls Conservation Area, Inglis Falls is an 18-metre-high (59 ft) cascade, created by the Sydenham River meeting the edge of the Niagara Escarpment. Swimming is prohibited in the entire area. The Conservation Area includes 7.42 km of hiking and mountain bike trails.

The Area has 20 species of ferns, a variety of birds and geological potholes. In the late fall, salmon arrive at the river to spawn.

The property has been owned by the North Grey Region Conservation Authority, now the Grey Sauble Conservation Authority, since 1960.

== History ==
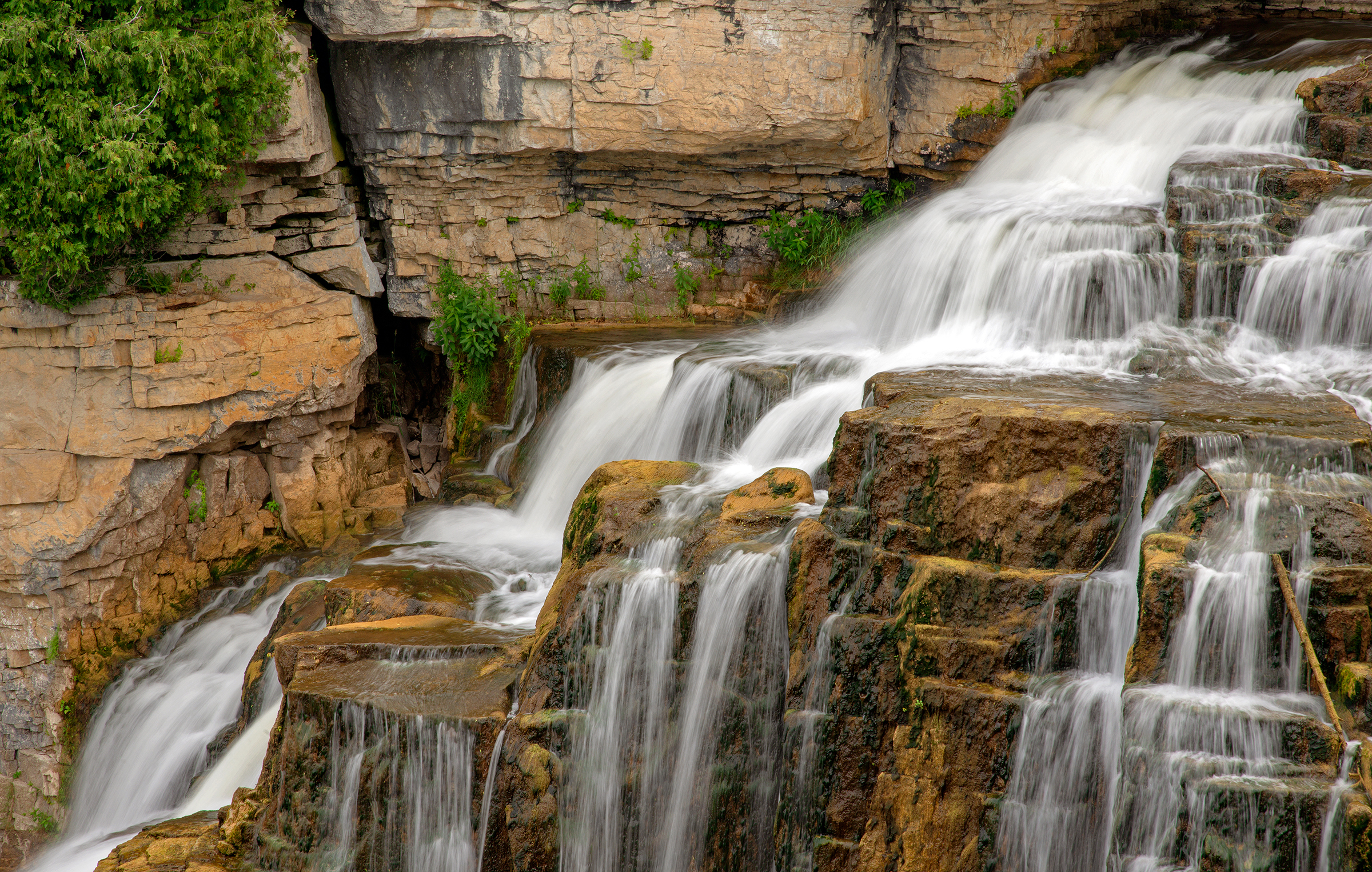
Closeup of the upper cascades

At one time, the water over the falls was partially diverted for hydro electric power generation, grain milling, woolen milling and as drinking water for Owen Sound.

Scottish immigrant Peter Inglis built a four-storey grist mill at the top of the falls in 1862, replacing a partially-completed gristmill that had been built in 1842 by millwright Mr. Elliot. The Inglis mill was torn down in the 1870s and replaced with a woolen mill on the east side of the river. That mill burned down in 1885 and was rebuilt but burned down again in 1901. It was not rebuilt; instead, a sawmill was built a quarter mile downstream of the falls. A plant to filter water for Owen Sound residents was built in 1910; its ruins are still on site.

The Inglis family owned a mill at or near the falls until 1932 when the city obtained the property. Another individual, Emil Henkel, operated the mill until 1945 when it was extensively damaged by fire. The Conservation Area still contains a stone family home, a ruined mill below the falls and millstones.

== See also ==
- List of waterfalls
- List of waterfalls of Canada

== Sources ==
- Inglis Falls Conservation Area
- Photos of Inglis and other Ontario waterfalls
