= Sydenham River (Lake Huron) =

River in Ontario, Canada

Coordinates: 44°34′N 80°56.5′W

The Sydenham River is a river in Grey County in southern Ontario. The river flows north from a source near Williamsford (Williams Lake), drops over the Niagara Escarpment at Inglis Falls and empties into Owen Sound harbour on Georgian Bay. It was named after Lord Sydenham, governor of Canada from 1839 to 1841. The river was formed from pre-glacial river along the Niagara Escarpment.

The river is obstructed by Mill Dam. At this dam is a fish ladder that allows Chinook Salmon and Rainbow Trout to complete their spawning migrations in this river.

== Tributaries and falls ==
The Spey River is a tributary of this river that forms south of Inglis Falls.

The 18m tall Inglis Falls is named for settler and miller Peter Inglis.

== See also ==
- List of rivers of Ontario
