= John Cozens (musician) =

Canadian musician (1906–1999)

John Cozens (27 April 1906 – 5 April 1999) was a Canadian arts administrator, arranger, choir conductor, and tenor of English birth. He became a naturalized Canadian citizen in 1950.

== Early life and education ==
Born in Tottenham, London, Cozens moved with his family to Canada in 1913 at the age of 7. At the age of 12 he began singing on the radio and performing as a church soloist; pursuits he was actively involved in from 1918 to 1950 in Toronto. At the age of 18 he entered the Toronto Conservatory of Music where he was a voice and conducting student of Francis Combe from 1924 to 1929. After graduating he pursued further studies privately with Nina de Gedeonoff from 1930 to 1935.

== Career ==
During the Great Depression, Cozens and his wife, singer Winnifred Pitman, founded and directed the Toronto's Council Choir. He served as the conductor of several other Toronto-based choirs, including the Tallis Choir, which specialized in polyphonic music, from 1935 to 1965. In 1951 he and S. Drummond Wolff co-founded the Orpheus Choir of Toronto which performed for four seasons. In 1972 he began conducting the Ontario Civil Service Choir with whom he was still active in the 1990s.

Cozens was secretary of the Canadian Music Council from 1944 to 1976. Upon his retirement from that position he was awarded the Canadian Music Council Medal for outstanding service to Canadian music and was named honorary secretary. He served as the publicity director of the Toronto Conservatory of Music from 1945 to 1949. He was manager of the Toronto branch of the Western Music Co. from 1949 to 1952. He held the post of chief of protocol for the Ontario government from 1960 to 1972 and later worked in a similar capacity for the Canadian National Exhibition.

During his life Cozens also was a frequent guest lecturer on sacred music. He was named an Honorary Life Member of the Royal School of Church Music in 1987. He was also a heraldic artist. He died in Port Hope, Ontario at the age of 92.
