= Owen Sound =

City in Ontario, Canada

- City (lower-tier)
- City of Owen Sound
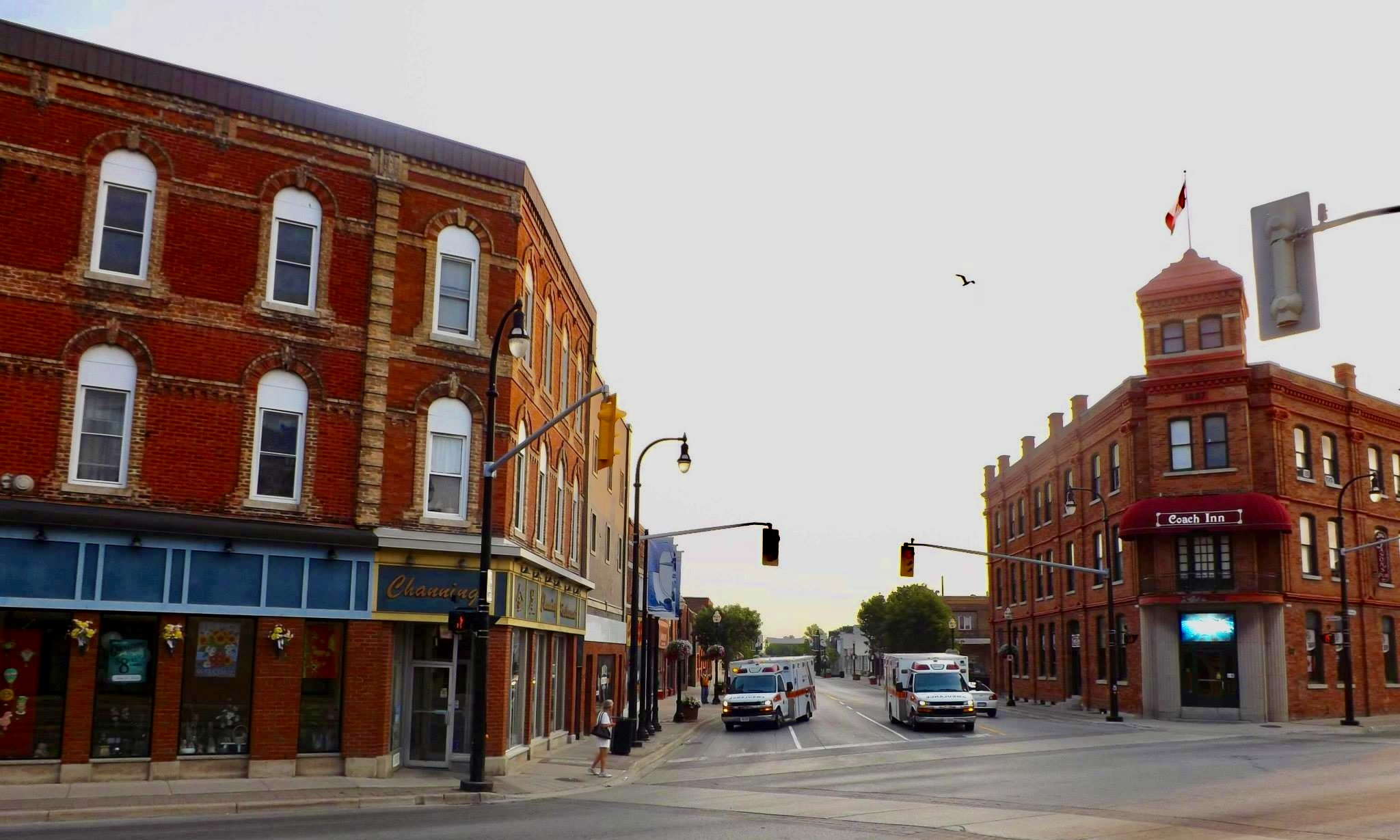
- Owen Sound downtown

- Logo
- Nickname: The Scenic City
- Location within Southern Ontario Location within Grey County
- Coordinates: 44°34′04″N 80°56′35″W
- Country: Canada
- Province: Ontario
- County: Grey

Government
  - Mayor: Ian Boddy
  - Deputy Mayor: Scott Grieg
  - Governing Body: Owen Sound City Council
  - MPs: Alex Ruff
  - MPPs: Paul Vickers

Area
  - Land: 24.21 km^{2} (9.35 sq mi)
  - Urban: 20.86 km^{2} (8.05 sq mi)
  - Metro: 624.18 km^{2} (241.00 sq mi)
- Elevation: 307 m (1,008 ft)

Population (2021)
  - Total: 21,612
  - Density: 892.6/km^{2} (2,312/sq mi)
  - Urban: 22,318
  - Urban density: 1,069.6/km^{2} (2,770/sq mi)
  - Metro: 32,712
  - Metro density: 52.4/km^{2} (136/sq mi)
- Time zone: UTC−05:00 (EST)
  - Summer (DST): UTC−04:00 (EDT)
- Postal code FSA: N4K
- Area codes: 519, 226, 548
- Highways: Highway 21; Highway 6 Highway 10; Highway 26
- Website: www.owensound.ca

Owen Sound is a city in Southwestern Ontario, Canada. The seat of government of Grey County, it is located at the mouths of the Pottawatomi and Sydenham Rivers on the eponymous inlet of Georgian Bay.

The primary tourist attractions are the many waterfalls within a short drive of the town.

== History ==
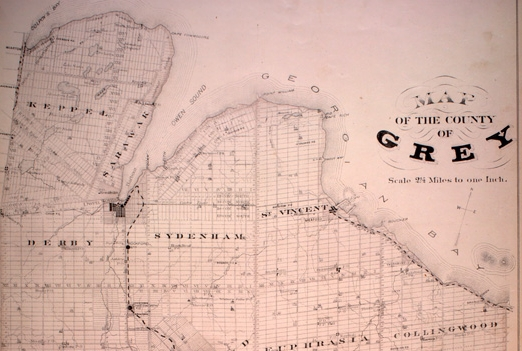
Community of Owen Sound, at the base of the Owen Sound inlet, in 1880.

The area around the upper Great Lakes has been home to the Ojibwe people since prehistory. In 1815, William Fitzwilliam Owen surveyed the area and named the inlet after his older brother Admiral Edward Owen. The name of the area in Ojibwe language is Gchi-wiigwedong.

A settlement called "Sydenham" was established in 1840 or 1841 by Charles Rankin in an area that had been inhabited by First Nations people. John Telfer settled here at that time and others followed. By 1846, the population was 150 and a sawmill and gristmill were operating. The name Sydenham continued even as the community became the seat for Grey County in 1852.

An Ontario historical plaque explains that a First Nations Band, led by Chief Newash had a reserve in the area totalling about 11,000 acres (45 km^{2}; 4,500 ha). In 1842, they established the village of Newash which initially contained fourteen log houses, a school and a barn; the population was served by Wesleyan Methodist missionaries. In 1857, the government took over the reserve area and moved most of the Chippewa inhabitants of Newash to the Cape Croker Hunting Ground 60B reserve north of Owen Sound.

Over the years, Owen Sound was a major port best known for its taverns and brothels. The community acquired names as the Chicago of the North, Corkscrew City, and Little Liverpool because of its rowdy reputation. Supporting this reputation was a tavern named "Bucket of Blood", located on the corner of an intersection known as "Damnation Corners", because of taverns on all four corners, but this location was also only a block away from an intersection with four churches called "Salvation Corners".

Sydenham was renamed Owen Sound in 1851; by then, it was served by a direct road to Toronto Township (today Mississauga), the Toronto-Sydenham Road; which still exists as Highway 10 and the southern portion of Hurontario Street. The community became an incorporated town in 1857, with a population of nearly 2000. In 1873, the Toronto, Grey and Bruce Railway from Weston arrived and allowed for shipping goods to and from the community.

Louis' Steakhouse, a popular upscale restaurant just outside town, was opened by the Gavaris family in the 1980s in a historic building which changed hands several times before being demolished in 2016. It was originally a home (built in 1881), but became a brothel from 1907 to 1915, where the madam would stand in its castle-like tower and watch the port for a ship to come in, and she would ready her prostitutes to excite the sailors. This reputation for vice and villainy, and the problems that came with it, caused the city to ban all drinking establishments for several decades. The city was "dry" until 1972.

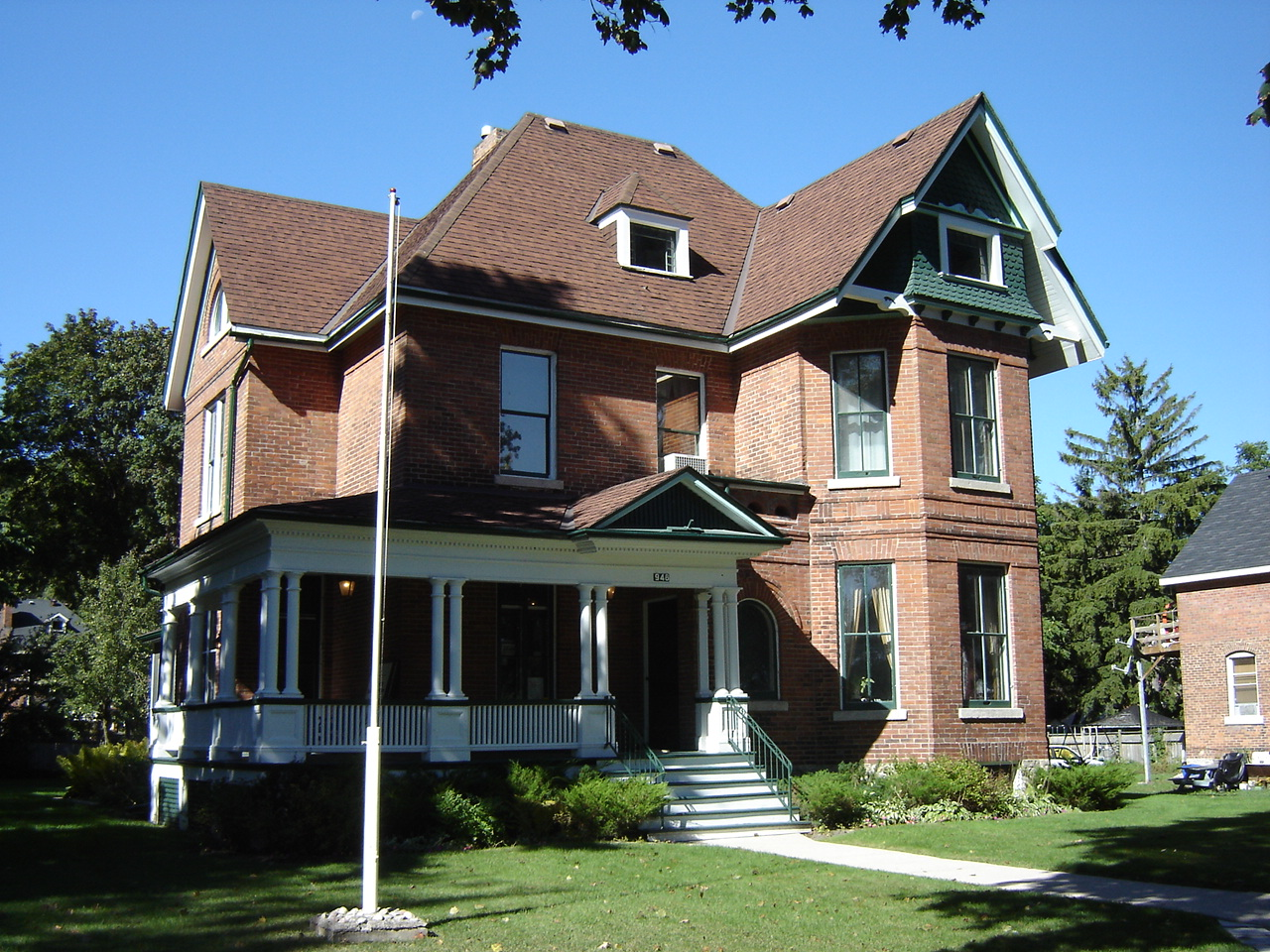
Billy Bishop Home/Museum

One of the city's most famous sons was World War I flying ace and Victoria Cross winner, William Avery "Billy" Bishop, born in Owen Sound, and Canada's leading pilot in the war. He flew with the Royal Flying Corps and Royal Air Force. In 1917 and 1918, Bishop was credited with downing 72 enemy aircraft. He was awarded the Victoria Cross, the Distinguished Service Order and the Military Cross. After the war, he was promoted to Air Marshall and worked as director of recruiting for the Royal Canadian Air Force (RCAF). Bishop is also one of the few to have tangled with Manfred von Richthofen (the Red Baron) and survived, forcing the German pilot to retreat in a damaged aircraft. Bishop later recalled that it was a "close shave, but a wonderful, soul-stirring flight." Bishop's boyhood home, one of the National Historic Sites of Canada, is a museum with artifacts from his life.

The former Billy Bishop Regional Airport in the nearby Municipality of Meaford was named after him. His modest gravesite can be visited in the city's Greenwood Cemetery by those willing to take the time to locate the stone. His boyhood home is now a museum dedicated to his life and to Canada's aviation history. The town was also the home of National Hockey League (NHL) Hall of Fame goaltender Harry Lumley and the artist Tom Thomson (buried in the nearby village of Leith). Surgeon Norman Bethune, an avowed communist and pioneer of public medicine who gained notoriety in his innovative medical work with the Chinese army during the Second Sino-Japanese War, is an alumnus of the Owen Sound Collegiate and Vocational Institute. Legendary hockey broadcaster Bill Hewitt was once sports director of the local AM radio station, CFOS. Thomas William Holmes, another Victoria Cross winner, was also from Owen Sound, and the city's armoury bears his name.

In 2005, Owen Sound became the National Communities in Bloom champion in the cities of 20,001–50,000 category in Canada for its beauty, natural landscape, and strong sense of community. Owen Sound has been recently recognized as a good retirement community due to its cultural, sports and natural amenities.

== Geography and climate ==
Owen Sound experiences a humid continental climate (Köppen climate classification Dfb) that is moderated by Lake Huron. Winters are cold and very snowy, while summers are warm and humid, but cooled by the lake waters (Georgian Bay and Lake Huron on either side) more than most other areas of southwestern Ontario. Precipitation is moderately high, as Owen Sound is in the direct line of the Great Lakes snowbelt, with an annual average precipitation of 1,100 mm (43 in). Summer thunderstorms are a common occurrence.

The highest temperature ever recorded in Owen Sound was 40.0 °C (104.0 °F) on July 3, 1911. The coldest temperature ever recorded was −36.7 °C (−34.1 °F) on February 6, 1895.

Climate data for Owen Sound, 1981−2010 normals, extremes 1878−present
Month	Jan	Feb	Mar	Apr	May	Jun	Jul	Aug	Sep	Oct	Nov	Dec	Year
Record high °C (°F)	15.6 (60.1)	18.5 (65.3)	26.1 (79.0)	30.5 (86.9)	36.1 (97.0)	35.0 (95.0)	40.0 (104.0)	37.2 (99.0)	35.6 (96.1)	30.6 (87.1)	22.8 (73.0)	18.5 (65.3)	40.0 (104.0)
Mean daily maximum °C (°F)	−1.9 (28.6)	−1.0 (30.2)	3.2 (37.8)	10.3 (50.5)	16.6 (61.9)	21.7 (71.1)	24.8 (76.6)	24.2 (75.6)	20.2 (68.4)	13.4 (56.1)	6.9 (44.4)	1.1 (34.0)	11.6 (52.9)
Daily mean °C (°F)	−5.4 (22.3)	−4.8 (23.4)	−1 (30)	5.8 (42.4)	11.5 (52.7)	16.6 (61.9)	20.1 (68.2)	19.6 (67.3)	15.8 (60.4)	9.6 (49.3)	3.8 (38.8)	−1.8 (28.8)	7.5 (45.5)
Mean daily minimum °C (°F)	−9.0 (15.8)	−8.7 (16.3)	−5.2 (22.6)	1.2 (34.2)	6.4 (43.5)	11.5 (52.7)	15.3 (59.5)	15.0 (59.0)	11.4 (52.5)	5.7 (42.3)	0.7 (33.3)	−4.8 (23.4)	3.3 (37.9)
Record low °C (°F)	−34.4 (−29.9)	−36.7 (−34.1)	−31.1 (−24.0)	−18.3 (−0.9)	−7.8 (18.0)	−1.7 (28.9)	1.1 (34.0)	2.2 (36.0)	−3.3 (26.1)	−10.6 (12.9)	−23.3 (−9.9)	−30.0 (−22.0)	−36.7 (−34.1)
Average precipitation mm (inches)	128.8 (5.07)	86.3 (3.40)	77.8 (3.06)	71.0 (2.80)	84.0 (3.31)	73.5 (2.89)	70.4 (2.77)	78.7 (3.10)	106.1 (4.18)	98.0 (3.86)	110.0 (4.33)	129.9 (5.11)	1,114.4 (43.87)
Average rainfall mm (inches)	27.9 (1.10)	21.5 (0.85)	42.4 (1.67)	63.8 (2.51)	84.0 (3.31)	73.5 (2.89)	70.4 (2.77)	78.7 (3.10)	106.1 (4.18)	96.4 (3.80)	82.8 (3.26)	36.7 (1.44)	783.9 (30.86)
Average snowfall cm (inches)	101.0 (39.8)	64.8 (25.5)	35.4 (13.9)	7.3 (2.9)	0.1 (0.0)	0.0 (0.0)	0.0 (0.0)	0.0 (0.0)	0.0 (0.0)	1.6 (0.6)	27.2 (10.7)	93.2 (36.7)	330.4 (130.1)
Average precipitation days (≥ 0.2 mm)	20.7	15.0	12.9	13.4	12.8	11.1	10.4	11.6	13.9	17.7	17.7	19.7	176.8
Average rainy days (≥ 0.2 mm)	4.4	3.5	6.4	12.3	12.8	11.1	10.4	11.6	13.9	17.5	13.7	7.1	124.7
Average snowy days (≥ 0.2 cm)	17.4	12.3	7.8	2.0	0.04	0.0	0.0	0.0	0.0	0.5	5.5	14.0	59.5
Source: Environment Canada

The Sydenham River is a waterway that connects to Owen Sound Bay and was formed from a pre-glacial river cutting into the limestone of the Niagara Escarpment.

== Demographics ==
In the 2021 Census of Population conducted by Statistics Canada, Owen Sound had a population of 21,612 living in 9,895 of its 10,406 total private dwellings, a change of 1.3% from its 2016 population of 21,341. With a land area of 24.21 km^{2} (9.35 sq mi), it had a population density of 892.7/km^{2} (2,312.1/sq mi) in 2021.

Canada census – Owen Sound, ON community profile

	2021	2016	2011
Population	21,612 (+1.3% from 2016)	21,341 (-1.6% from 2011)	21,688 (-0.3% from 2006)
Land area	24.21 km^{2} (9.35 sq mi)	24.27 km^{2} (9.37 sq mi)	24.22 km^{2} (9.35 sq mi)
Population density	892.6/km^{2} (2,312/sq mi)	879.2/km^{2} (2,277/sq mi)	895.5/km^{2} (2,319/sq mi)
Median age	48.0 (M: 44.4, F: 50.8)	47.8 (M: 45.1, F: 50.1)
Private dwellings	10,406 (total) 9,895 (occupied)	10,098 (total) 9,630 (occupied)
Median household income	$63,200	$51,042

References: 2021 2016 2011

Historical populations

Year	Pop.	±%
1871	3,369	—
1881	4,426	+31.4%
1891	7,497	+69.4%
1901	8,776	+17.1%
1911	12,559	+43.1%
1921	12,190	−2.9%
1931	12,839	+5.3%
1941	13,810	+7.6%

Year	Pop.	±%
1951	16,423	+18.9%
1956	16,976	+3.4%
1961	17,421	+2.6%
1966	17,769	+2.0%
1971	18,469	+3.9%
1976	19,525	+5.7%
1981	19,883	+1.8%
1986	19,804	−0.4%

Year	Pop.	±%
1991	21,674	+9.4%
1996	21,390	−1.3%
2001	21,431	+0.2%
2006	21,753	+1.5%
2011	21,688	−0.3%
2016	21,341	−1.6%
2021	21,612	+1.3%

Population counts are not adjusted for boundary changes.
Source: Statistics Canada

== Economy ==
The Parrish & Heimbecker Grain Terminal (Great Lakes Elevator Co Ltd) is located in the inner harbour. The original CPR grain elevators were destroyed by fire in 1911. Transport Canada has divested the harbour.

Owen Sound was home to a handful of shipbuilders since the 1840s with two notable companies:

- Polson Iron Works from 1888 to 1897
- Russel Brothers from 1937 (moved from Fort Frances) to 1994 and located on current vacant lots at 2050 and 2198 3rd Avenue East with the launch slip the only reminder of the shipyards.

== Government ==
Owen Sound is governed by the Owen Sound City Council, consisting of a mayor, deputy mayor, and seven councilors, all of whom are elected at-large. As of October 2022, the current mayor of Owen Sound is Ian Boddy. Boddy was elected to City Council in 2010, as Mayor in 2014, and re-elected in 2018 and 2022.

== Culture and events ==
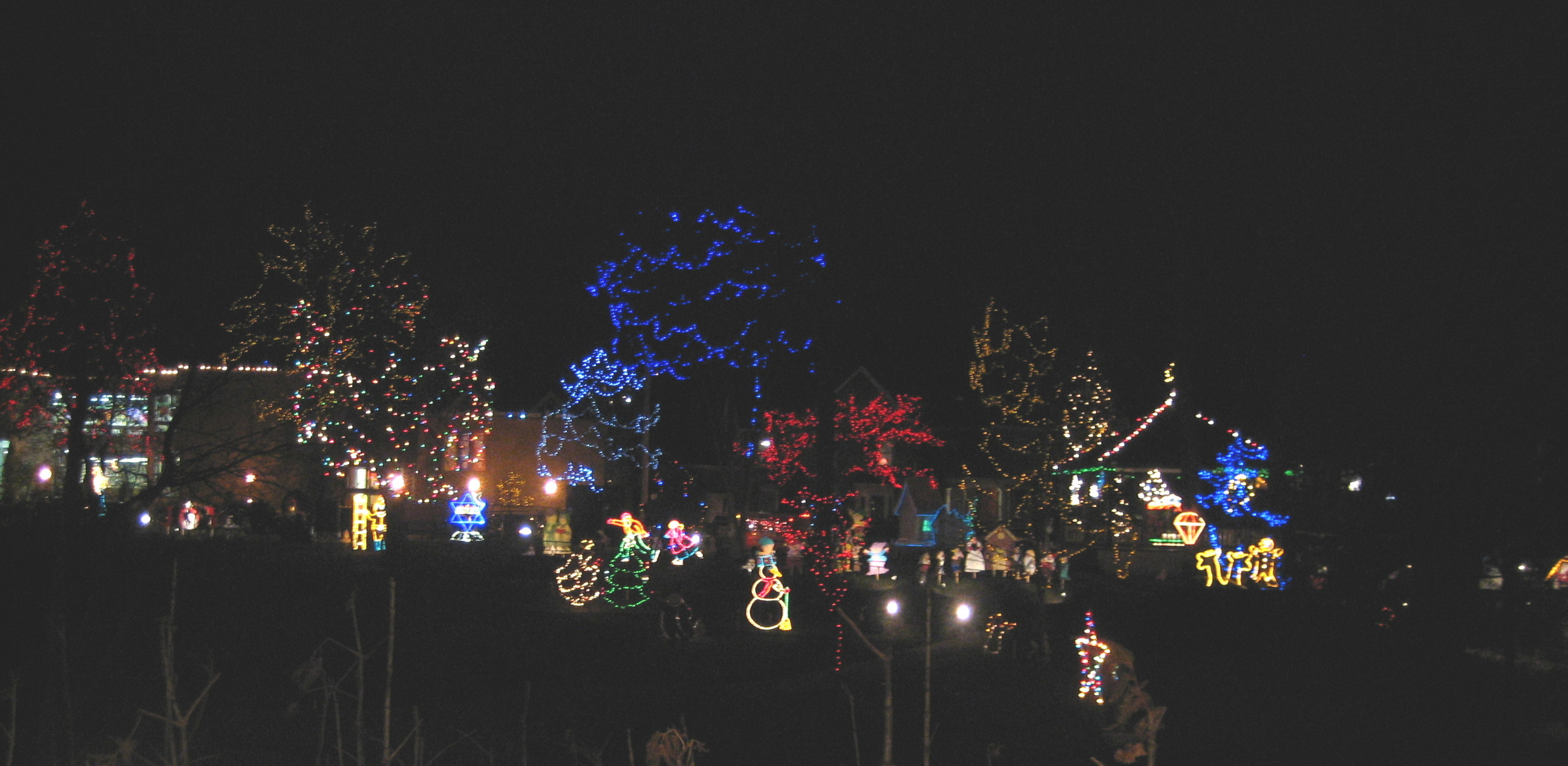
Festival of Northern Lights.

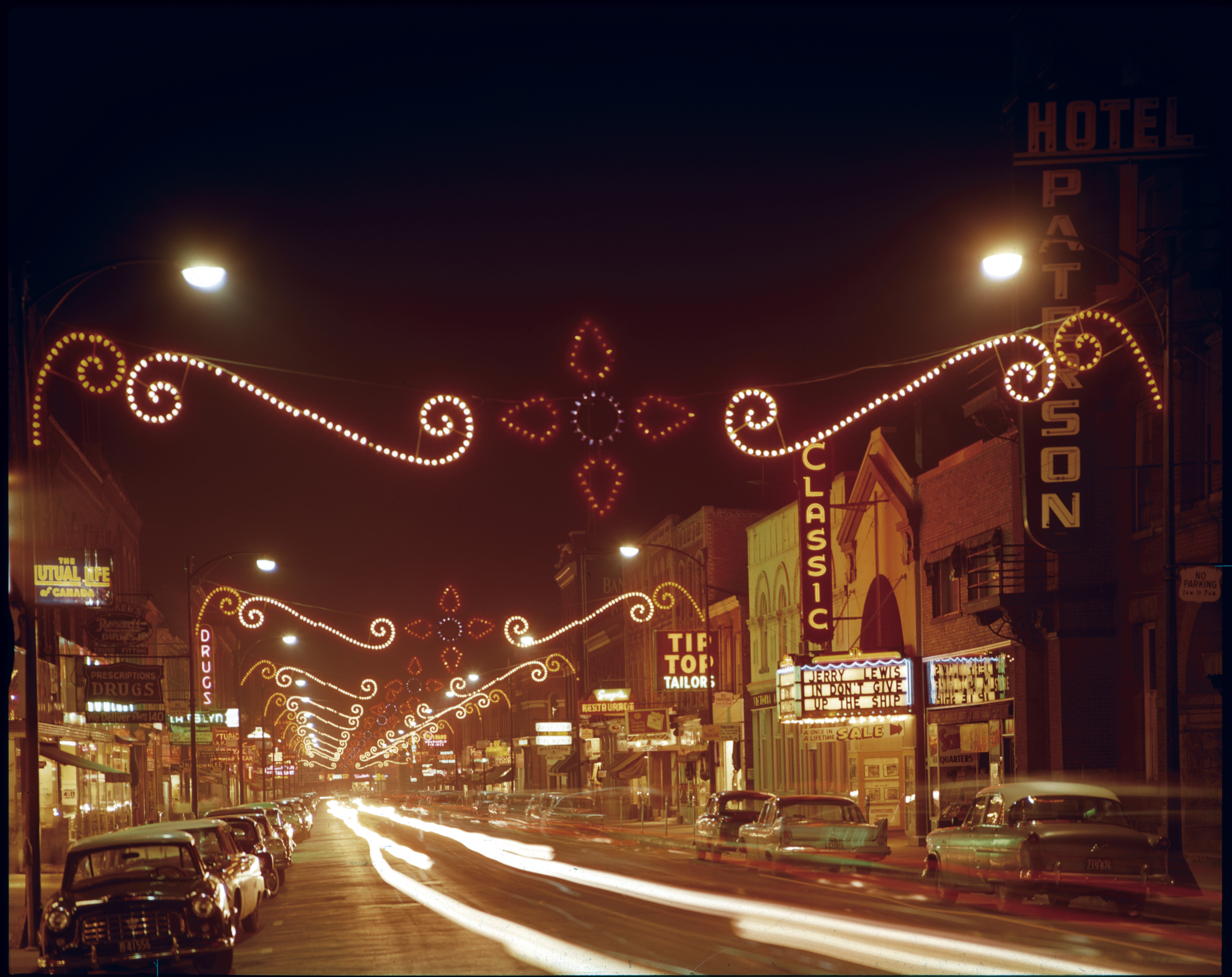
Owen Sound at night, 1959

The City of Owen Sound was a 2004 Cultural Capital of Canada and is home to a number of cultural events and facilities. It is home to the Summerfolk Music and Crafts Festival, held every August, and the Festival of Northern Lights, a large Christmas lights festival with many displays along the Sydenham River, downtown, and in Harrison Park, held from November until January every winter, as well as A Novel Marathon, a special event fund raiser for the Adult Literacy Program of the Owen Sound and North Grey Union Public Library.

In 2007, Owen Sound celebrated its 150th year since incorporation, with special events throughout the year highlighted by the 10-day Homecoming 2007 celebrations July 27 to August 5.

Theatrically, the city's 400-seat Roxy Theatre, owned and operated by the Owen Sound Little Theatre, is used for the city's professional live theatre performances, as well as some concerts. The Youth Theatre Coalition is also prevalent in the area. It is a youth theatre company run entirely by youth and for youth. The organization presents musical, theatrical, and concert type performances throughout the year.

The city is also home to a good number of museums and cultural attractions, including:

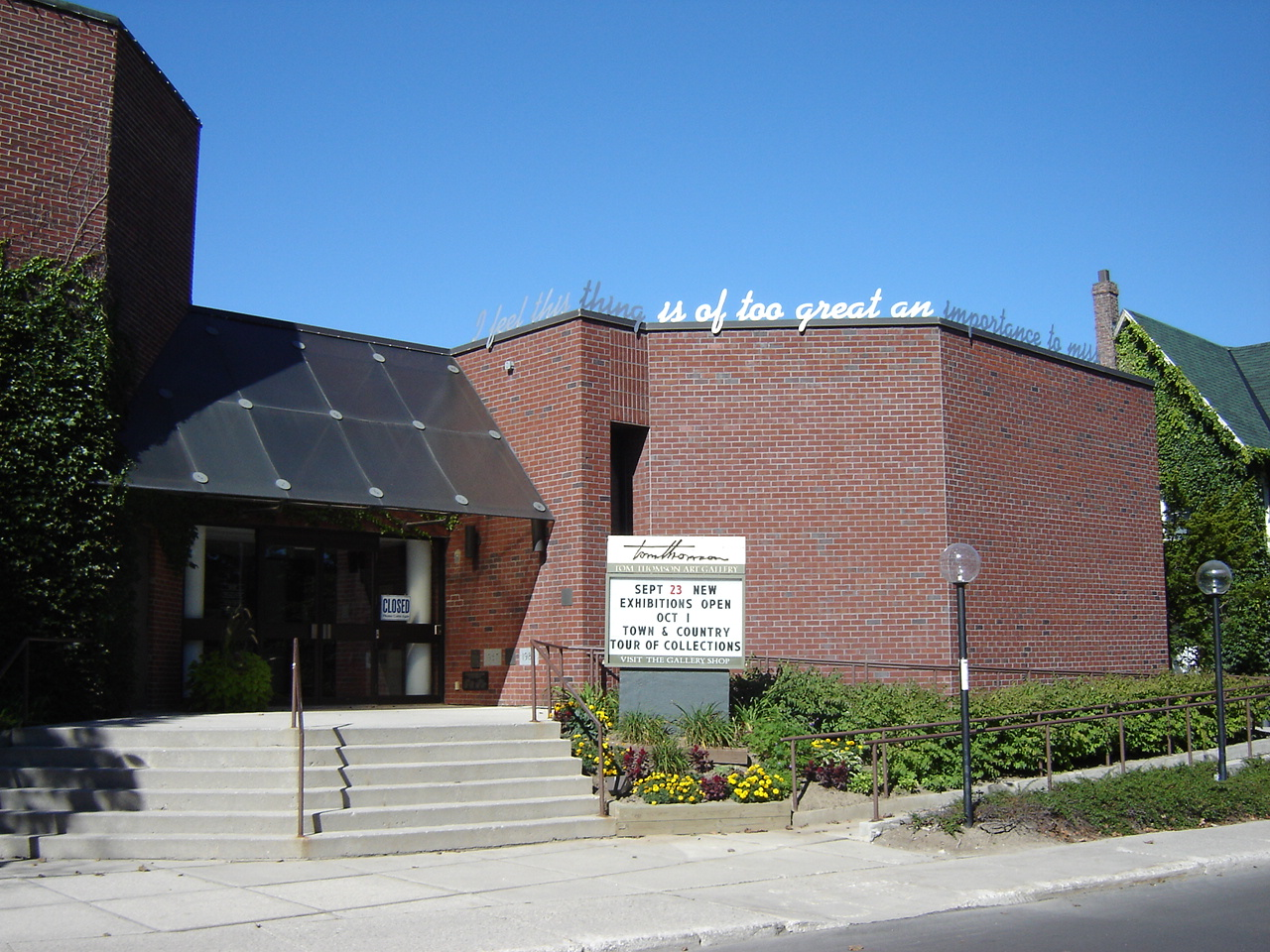
Tom Thomson Art Gallery

- Grey Roots Museum and Archives – showcasing the history of the city of Owen Sound and Grey County
- The Roxy Theatre - the region's premier destination for live entertainment.
- Owen Sound Artists' Co-op - established in 1994 and located in the historic McKay building downtown Owen Sound, features the work of 45 local artists, along with monthly guest artists and Legacy Gallery exhibitors.
- Tom Thomson Memorial Art Gallery – featuring a large collection of memorabilia and works from Tom Thomson, one of Canada's most famous artists who grew up in the Owen Sound area.
- Community Waterfront Heritage Centre – showcasing the city's rich history in rail and water transportation and its role in the growth of Ontario.
- Billy Bishop Home and Museum – located in Bishop's former home, is dedicated to the life and times of Billy Bishop and Canada's history in aviation.
- Black History Cairn – located in historic Harrison Park, celebrating Owen Sound's status as a northern terminus of the Underground Railroad.
- Owen Sound Farmer's Market – occupying the same location since 1868, the Market is open every Saturday morning throughout the year and hosts a wide variety of growers and artisans.
- Owen Sound's Beth Ezekiel Synagogue, a designated building under Ontario's Heritage Act as one of the few remaining examples of a small town Ontario synagogue. It is the last active small town synagogue in Canada.
- Georgian Bay Symphony – is a regional community orchestra consisting of 55 volunteer musicians and five professional core string players. The Symphony performs 5 Main Concerts a year at the OSCVI as well as performing at various civic events.
- The Owen Sound City Band founded in 1923 is a volunteer organization made up of amateur musicians of all ages and abilities. The Band performs for Canada Day held every year at Kelso Beach, for the opening of the Festival of Northern Lights and other official events. The Band plays regularly over the summer at Harrison Park and Kelso Beach.
- The Summerfolk Music and Crafts Festival is a three-day music and crafts event founded in 1976 and held annually on the third weekend in August at Kelso Beach Park.

== Recreation ==
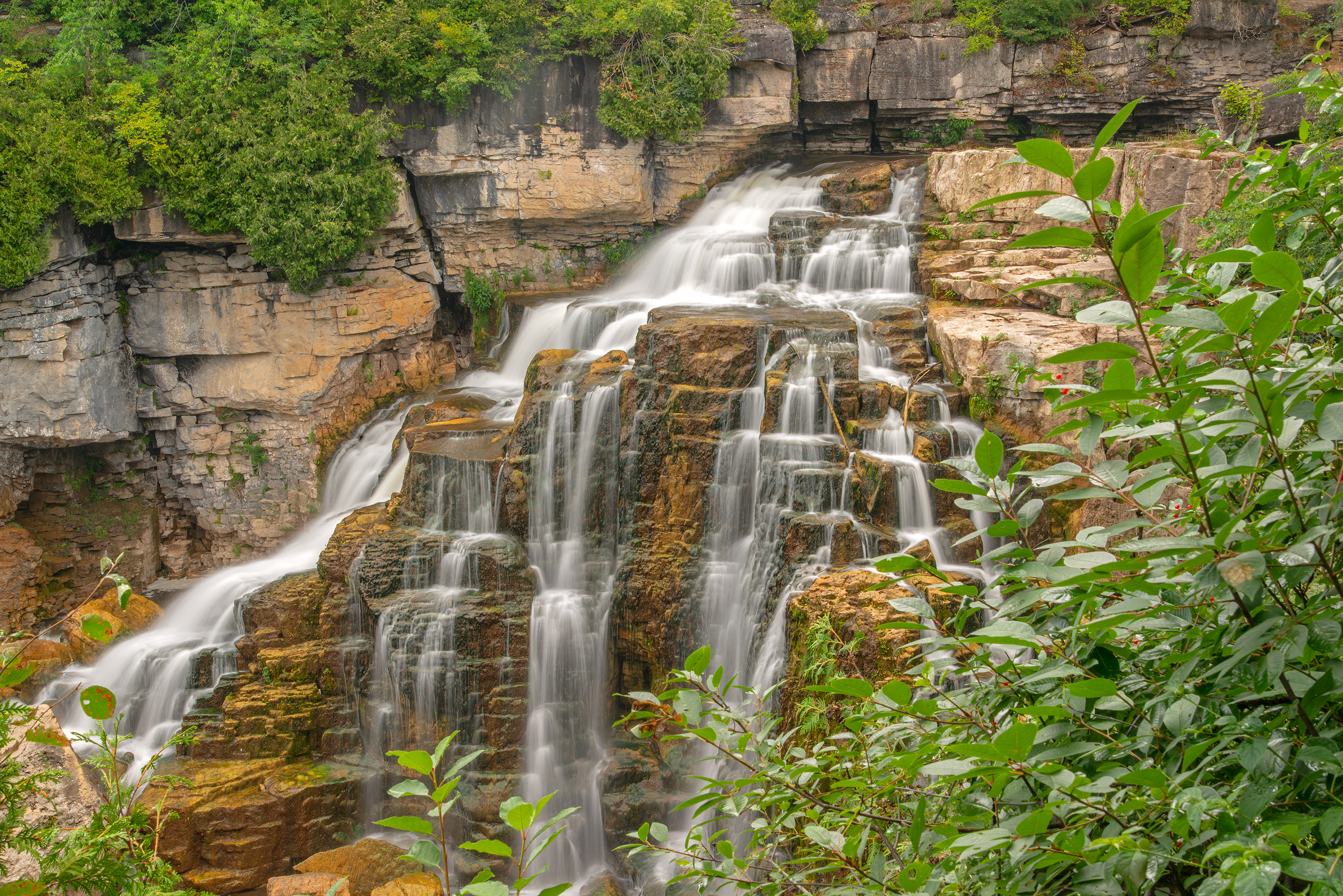
Inglis Falls is along one of the many hiking trails around Owen Sound

The city is one of two (the other being Barrie) that are home to The Grey and Simcoe Foresters Primary Reserve Infantry regiment, as well as various cadet corps.

The Owen Sound area has several waterfalls, some outside the city limits. They range from large, such as the 18 m (59 ft) high Inglis Falls created by the Sydenham River meeting the edge of the Niagara Escarpment to small, such as Weaver's Creek Falls; some are along hiking trails that range in difficulty from moderate to strenuous. Some of the hikes connect to the Bruce Trail. The Grey County tourist information office can provide maps for hikers. The two major parks in Owen Sound are Kelso Beach on Georgian Bay and Harrison Park.

Some of the largest rainbow trout in the world have been caught in Owen Sound, and annual fishing derbies draw large participation from all over North America.

Southeast of the city are several popular Ontario ski resorts, including Blue Mountain and Beaver Valley. The city and area also have numerous snowmobile trails.

=== Sports ===
Owen Sound is the smallest city in Ontario to host an Ontario Hockey League (OHL) Major Junior Hockey team, namely, the Owen Sound Attack, who play at the Harry Lumley Bayshore Community Centre arena. Originally the Owen Sound Attack were known as the Owen Sound Platers, having been moved from Guelph, Ontario where they played as the Guelph Platers. The Attack were purchased by a group of six local investors. The team played as the Owen Sound Platers from 1989-2000 and renamed the Owen Sound Attack in 2000, prior to the start of the 2000-2001 season.

The Attack won the J. Ross Robertson Cup as OHL Champions in 2011.

- Owen Sound Attack – Ontario Hockey League
- Owen Sound North Stars – Major Series Lacrosse
- Owen Sound North Stars – OLA Senior B Lacrosse League

==== Former teams ====
- Owen Sound Mercurys – OHA Senior A Hockey League
- Owen Sound Crescents – OHA Senior A Hockey League
- Owen Sound Canadians – Northern Senior B Hockey League
- Owen Sound Trappers – OHA Intermediate A Hockey League
- Owen Sound Platers – Ontario Hockey League (became Attack)
- Owen Sound Crescents – Major Series Lacrosse
- Owen Sound Greys – Mid-Western Junior Hockey League

== Infrastructure ==
=== Transportation ===
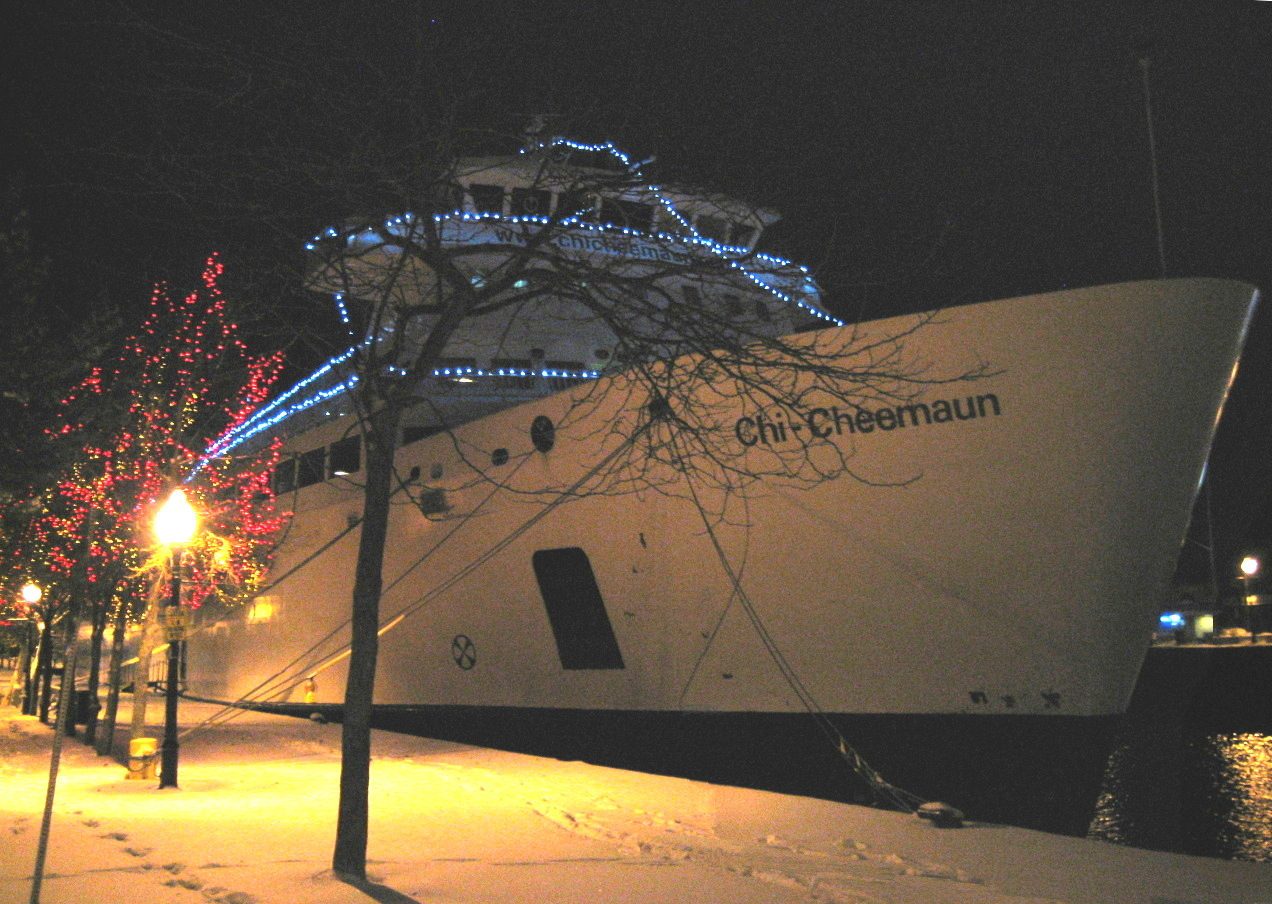
MS Chi-Cheemaun in Owen Sound.

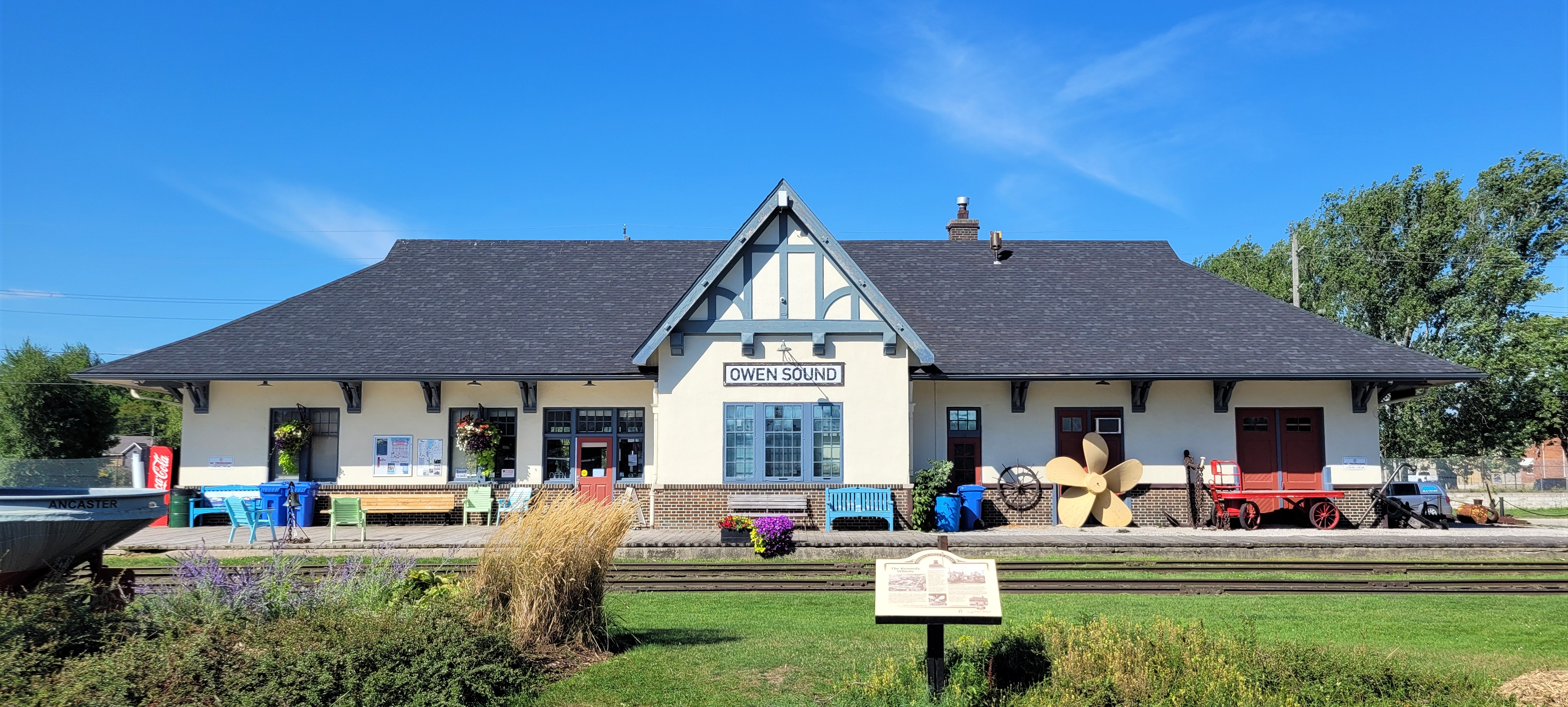
Canadian Pacific Railway Station, Owen Sound

Located at the junctions of Ontario Highways 6, 10, 21 and 26, the city serves as a gateway to the Bruce Peninsula.

Owen Sound Transit provides local bus service and specialized transportation for those unable to use the regular transit buses.

As home port of the Owen Sound Transportation Company, the inner harbour is where car ferry MS Chi-Cheemaun, which operates from Tobermory to South Baymouth, is docked during the winter months.

The Canadian Pacific Railway Owen Sound subdivision connected Orangeville and Owen Sound. Service was discontinued and the line was formally abandoned in 1995. The Canadian National Railway subdivision connected Guelph and Owen Sound via Palmerston, this line was discontinued in the 1990s. CPR Owen Sound station was built in 1946 and is now a restaurant and brewery. The CNR Owen Sound Station is now home to Owen Sound Marine and Rail Museum. Aircraft flying to Owen Sound may land at the Major-General Richard Rohmer Meaford International Airport (CYOS).

=== Health care ===
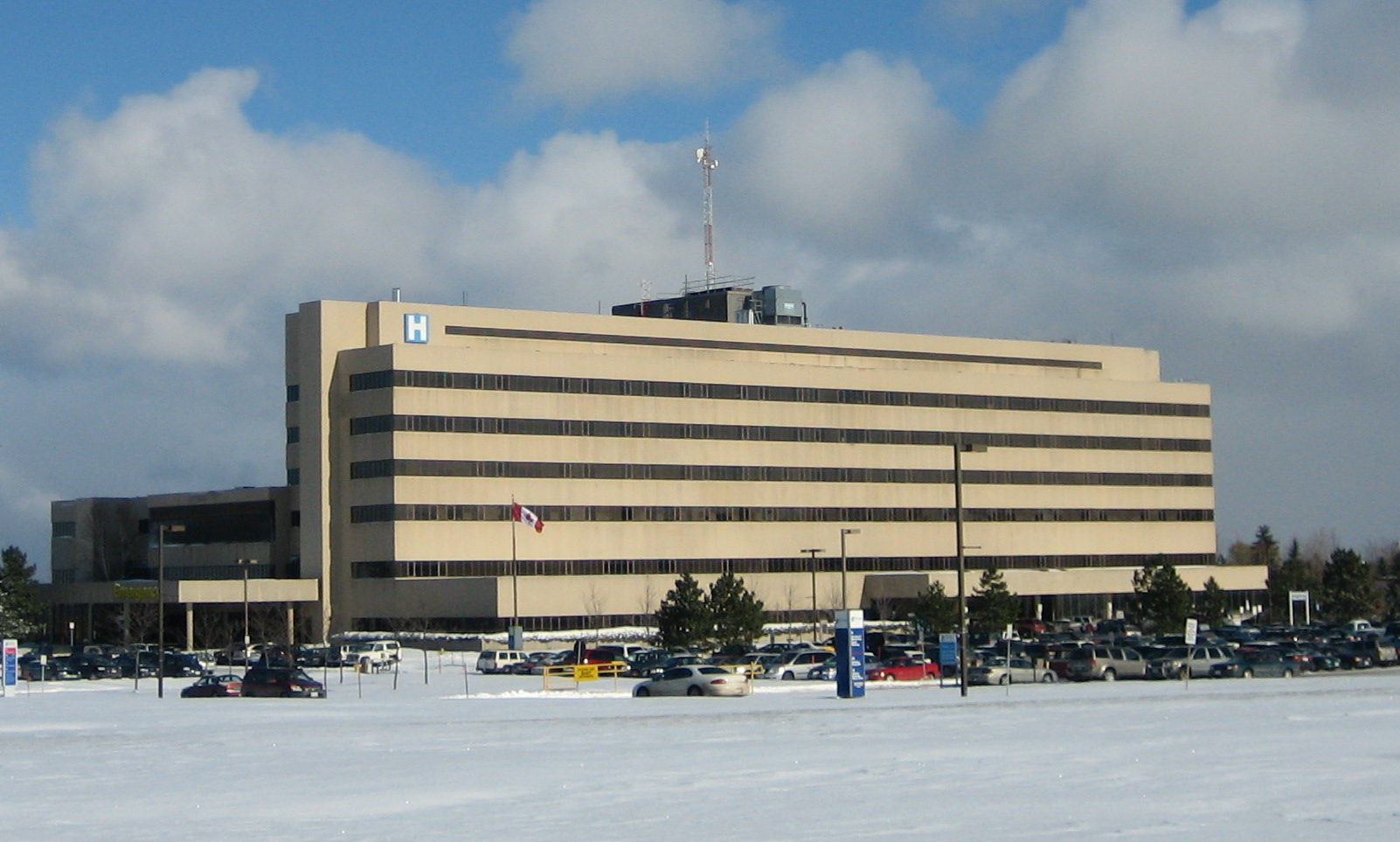
Owen Sound Hospital (now Brightshores Health System)

Owen Sound is the seat of Bright Shores Health System and has the largest hospital in the Grey County and Bruce County region.

=== Jail ===
The County of Grey opened a complex in 1854, including a courthouse and police services, a land registry office and a county jail. In 1960, the County of Grey moved the courthouse and land registry to another location at the edge of present-day Owen Sound, Ontario. At that time, March 11, 1960, the County of Grey and the City of Owen Sound signed a two-part agreement that was subsequently passed into bylaw. The first part required that the City of Owen Sound immediately purchase the courthouse portion of the complex. Part two of the agreement requires the City of Owen Sound to purchase the jail portion when the County of Grey no longer needs it for its own use. This occurred in 1978, when the province of Ontario transferred the county jails to provincial entities. The County of Grey and the City of Owen Sound escaped the latter part of the 1960 agreement to purchase the property by signing a 5-year renewable lease with the Province of Ontario and have profited greatly ever since. The County of Grey receives a monthly payment (approximately $12,000 as of 2011) for which they have no obligation to maintain the property; the City of Owen Sound kept the police services in the old courthouse until 1987/88 and then leased it to an arts council. In doing so, the jail lost all of their former entrances and moved all activities to the side of the jail, immediately beside the adjacent residence.

The jail was slated to close in 1996 and again in 2001 (the provincial jail system was overcrowded so prisoners were transferred to the smaller jails) and finally was closed down at the end of 2011, with the last three prisoners leaving by van on December 4, 2011 (3 pm). The jail was finally transferred firstly to the County of Grey (as the landlord) then to the City of Owen Sound, per the March 1960 agreement, in November 2014, after it was de-commissioned.

== Education ==
Owen Sound is home to a campus of Georgian College. The campus currently offers 14 full-time programs, including its Great Lakes International Marine Training and Research Centre. The centre trains professionals already working in the marine industry and students enrolled in the Marine Navigation Technology program and the Marine Engineering Technology program.

Public school education is managed by the Bluewater District School Board (BDSB), and Catholic schools are managed by the Bruce-Grey Catholic District School Board (BGCDSB). There are three high schools in town; St. Dominique Savio (a French Catholic school), St. Mary's (BGCDSB), Owen Sound District Secondary School (OSDSS). The latter formed after the amalgamation of West Hill Secondary School and Owen Sound Collegiate and Vocational Institute.

Owen Sound also provides a variety of French education options in the form of French immersion programs in both the public and Catholic school systems, as well as the only all French school and preschool in Grey and Bruce counties. Opportunities offered to French students include exchange programs and French summer camps.

== Notable residents ==
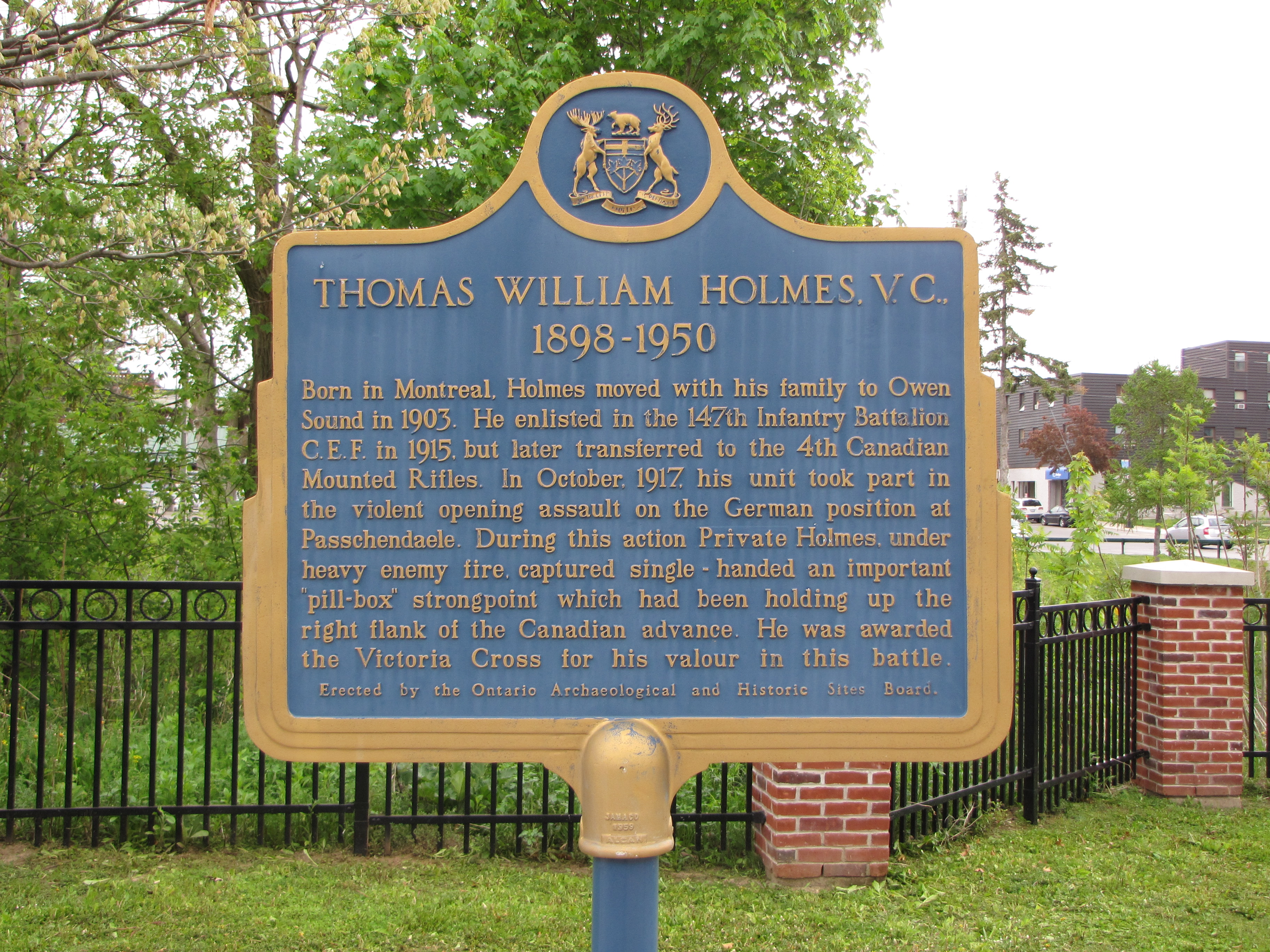
Thomas William Holmes V.C.

- Shelagh Armstrong, artist
- Norman Bethune, physician, medical innovator
- Billy Bishop, Canadian First World War fighter ace and winner of the Victoria Cross
- Barry Brown, Canadian country music singer-songwriter, former member of Family Brown and Prescott-Brown
- Margaret Miller Brown, classical pianist and music educator
- Robert Pim Butchart, horticulturist
- Gundega Cenne, artist
- Hap Day, NHL player and member of the Hockey Hall of Fame
- Janis Mackey Frayer, journalist
- Cheryl Hickey, television personality
- Heather Hiscox, television personality
- Thomas William Holmes, Canadian soldier and Victoria Cross recipient
- Alvin "Buck" Jones, professional hockey player
- Elizabeth Laird, physicist
- Harry Lumley, NHL goaltender and member of the Hockey Hall of Fame
- Agnes Macphail, Canadian politician and writer
- Jock McKeen, physician, author and lecturer
- Emma Priscilla Scott, educator and author
- Curtis Sanford, NHL player and former Owen Sound Plater
- Eddie Sargent, Canadian politician
- Tom Thomson, artist
- Jessie Trout, missionary, author, and United Christian Missionary Society leader
- Joan Thelma Watson, principal French horn of the Canadian Opera Orchestra and a founding member of the True North Brass quintet
- Lloyd Wootton, five-time Mann Cup winning lacrosse goaltender

== Popular culture ==
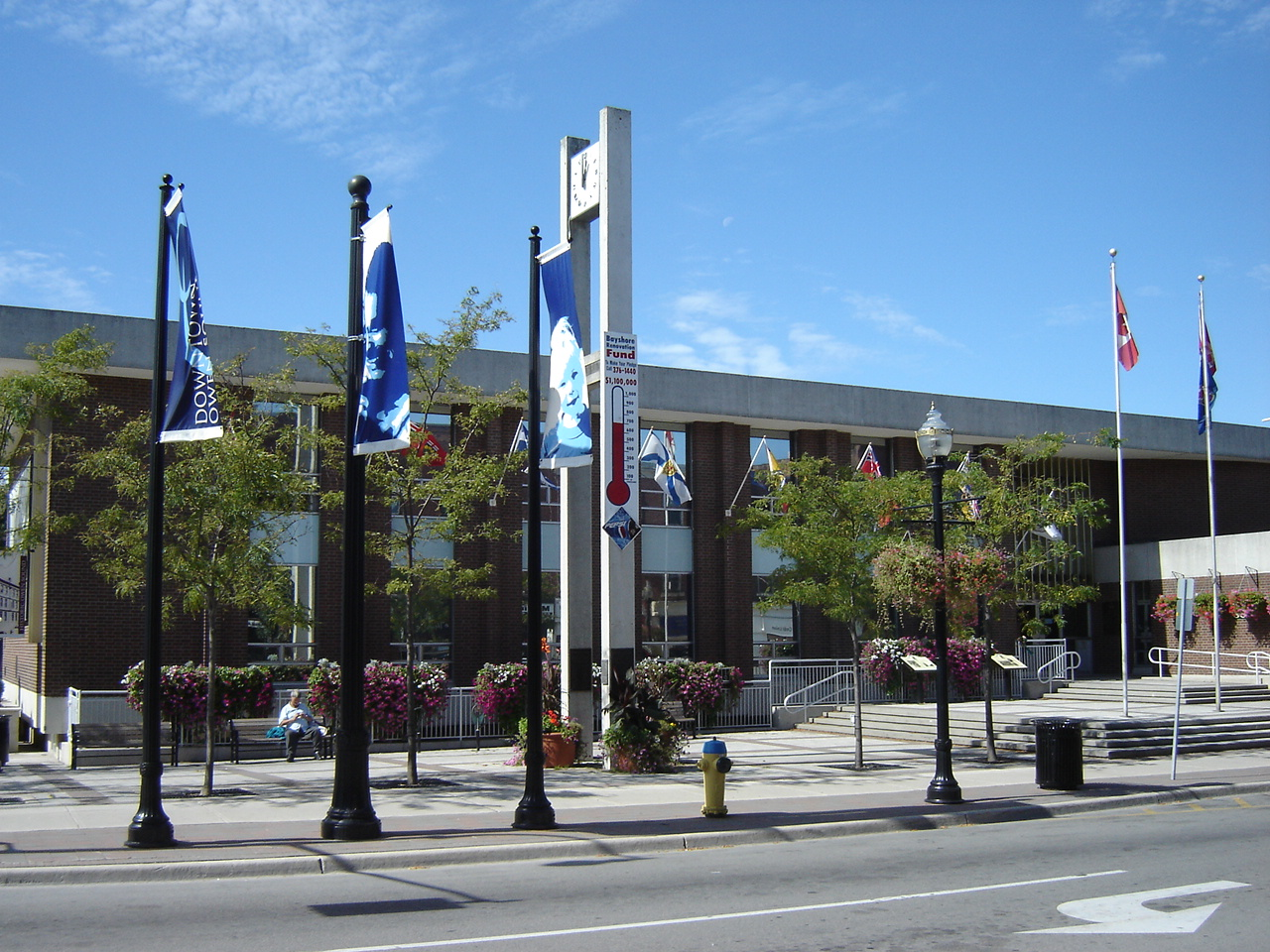
Owen Sound City Hall

Along with Meaford, Owen Sound was one of the filming locations for the 1985 Disney movie One Magic Christmas. Owen Sound's city hall served as the town hall in the film.

== Sister cities ==
Owen Sound's sister cities are:

- Miamisburg, Ohio, United States
- Ocho Rios, Jamaica
- Dayi County, China
