= 15th Parliament of Ontario =

Legislative session of the Parliament of Ontario

The 15th Legislative Assembly of Ontario was in session from October 20, 1919, until May 10, 1923. The parliament was elected in the 1919 Ontario general election and was dissolved prior to the 1923 general election. The leading party in the chamber after the election was the United Farmers of Ontario (UFO). It formed a coalition government with 11 Labour MLAs and three Independent candidates of varying stripes.

The coalition held a slight majority of the seats and the parties it represented had taken about 34 percent of the vote in the 1919 election. The rest of the votes had been split between the Conservatives, the Liberals and others, many of which were unsuccessful candidates. (Under the first-past-the-post system, any votes cast for unsuccessful candidates are simply disregarded.)

The UFO derived a benefit from winning many rural seats where the number of votes involved were less than in the urban districts. In Brant North the UFO candidate won while receiving only 3,600 votes while in Ottawa West the Conservative candidate took 9,000 votes to win his seat.

The party approached Ernest Charles Drury, who had not run in the election, to serve as party leader and premier. Drury had not run in the 1919 election and was elected in a by-election held in Halton in 1920. He made it known that the coalition government party should be known by the name "The People's Party."

Most of the seats the United Farmers won were taken at the expense of the Conservative party, who had formed the government in the preceding assembly and would again regain power in 1923.

Nelson Parliament served as speaker for the assembly.

The power wielded by the UFO-Labour coalition enabled the passage of progressive Labour and farmer legislation. The government created the first Department of Welfare for the province and brought in allowances for widows and children, a minimum wage for women and standardized adoption procedures. The government also expanded Ontario Hydro and promoted rural electrification, created the Province of Ontario Savings Office - a provincially owned bank that lent money to farmers at a lower rate - began the first major reforestation program in North America, and began construction of the modern highway system.

The government was a strict enforcer of the Ontario Temperance Act, enacted in 1916, and Prohibition stayed in force until 1927.

The 1923 election saw the UFO-Labour coalition government defeated by a re-energized Conservative Party. The UFO vote stayed solid as compared to 1919 but the UFO suffered under First past the post and took about half the seats it was due.

In 1924 (after the 1923 election), the provincial treasurer Peter Smith was found guilty of conspiracy to defraud the government following a series of events known as the Ontario Bond Scandal.

In the waning days of the UFO-Labour government, the government attempted to reform the province's electoral system (to introduce proportional representation) but the effort failed, in part due to Conservative opposition. The UFO suffered under the First past the post electoral system used in the 1923 election, taking just about half the seats they were due proportionally.

== Members of the Assembly ==
Italicized names indicate members returned by acclamation.

Riding	Member	Party	First elected / previously elected	No. of terms
Addington	William David Black	Conservative	1911	3rd term
Algoma	Kenneth Spencer Stover	Liberal	1919	1st term
Brant	Harry Corwin Nixon	United Farmers	1919	1st term
Brant South	Morrison Mann MacBride	Labour	1919	1st term
Brockville	Donald McAlpine	Liberal	1919	1st term
Bruce North	William Henry Fenton	United Farmers	1919	1st term
Bruce South	Frank Rennie	Liberal	1919	1st term
Bruce West	Alexander Patterson Mewhinney	Liberal	1919	1st term
Carleton	Robert Henry Grant	United Farmers	1919	1st term
Cochrane	Malcolm Lang	Liberal	1914	2nd term
Dufferin	Thomas Kerr Slack	United Farmers	1919	1st term
Dundas	William H. Casselman	United Farmers	1919	1st term
Durham East	Samuel Sandford Staples	United Farmers	1919	1st term
Durham West	William John Bragg	Liberal	1919	1st term
Elgin East	Malcolm MacVicar	United Farmers	1919	1st term
Elgin West	Peter Gow Cameron	United Farmers	1919	1st term
Essex North	Alphonse George Tisdelle	United Farmers	1919	1st term
Essex South	Milton C. Fox	United Farmers	1919	1st term
Fort William	Henry Mills	Labour	1919	1st term
Frontenac	Anthony McGuin Rankin	Conservative	1911	3rd term
Glengarry	Duncan Alexander Ross	United Farmers	1919	1st term
Grenville	George Howard Ferguson	Conservative	1905	5th term
Grey Centre	Dougall Carmichael	United Farmers	1919	1st term
Grey North	David James Taylor	Liberal-United Farmers	1919	1st term
Grey South	George Mansfield Leeson	United Farmers	1919	1st term
Haldimand	Warren Stringer	United Farmers	1919	1st term
Halton	John Featherstone Ford (Note: resigned his seat)	United Farmers	1919	1st term
Halton	Ernest Charles Drury (1920)	United Farmers	1920	1st term
Hamilton East	George Grant Halcrow	Labour	1919	1st term
Hamilton West	Walter Rollo	Labour	1919	1st term
Hastings East	Henry Ketcheson Denyes	United Farmers	1919	1st term
Hastings North	John Robert Cooke	Conservative	1911	3rd term
Hastings West	William Henry Ireland	Conservative	1919	1st term
Huron Centre	John M. Govenlock	Labour	1919	1st term
Huron North	John Joynt	Conservative	1919	1st term
Huron South	Andrew Hicks	United Farmers	1919	1st term
Kenora	Peter Heenan	Labour	1919	1st term
Kent East	James B. Clark	United Farmers	1919	1st term
Kent East	Manning William Doherty (1920)	United Farmers	1920	1st term
Kent West	Robert Livingstone Brackin	Liberal	1919	1st term
Kingston	Arthur Edward Ross (Note: elected to federal seat)	Conservative	1911	3rd term
Kingston	William Folger Nickle (1922)	Conservative	1908, 1922	2nd term*
Lambton East	Leslie Warner Oke	United Farmers	1919	1st term
Lambton West	Jonah Moorehouse Webster	United Farmers	1919	1st term
Lanark North	Hiram McCreary	United Farmers	1919	1st term
Lanark South	William J. Johnston	United Farmers	1919	1st term
Leeds	Andrew Wellington Gray	Conservative	1919	1st term
Lennox	Reginald Amherst Fowler	Conservative	1918	2nd term
Lincoln	Thomas A. Marshall	Liberal	1898	7th term
London	Hugh Allen Stevenson	Labour	1919	1st term
Manitoulin	Beniah Bowman	United Farmers	1918	2nd term
Middlesex East	John Willard Freeborn	United Farmers	1919	1st term
Middlesex North	James C. Brown	United Farmers	1919	1st term
Middlesex West	John Giles Lethbridge	United Farmers	1919	1st term
Muskoka	George Walter Ecclestone	Conservative	1916	2nd term
Niagara Falls	Charles Fletcher Swayze	Labour	1919	1st term
Nipissing	Joseph Marceau	Liberal	1919	1st term
Norfolk North	George David Sewell	United Farmers	1919	1st term
Norfolk South	Joseph Cridland	United Farmers	1919	1st term
Northumberland East	Wesley Montgomery	United Farmers	1919	1st term
Northumberland West	Samuel Clarke	Liberal	1898	7th term
Ontario North	John Wesley Widdifield	United Farmers	1919	2nd term
Ontario South	William Edmund Newton Sinclair	Liberal	1911, 1919	2nd term*
Ottawa East	Joseph Albert Pinard	Liberal	1914	2nd term
Ottawa West	Hammett Pinhey Hill	Conservative	1919	1st term
Oxford North	John Alexander Calder	Liberal	1918	2nd term
Oxford North	David Munroe Ross (1921)	United Farmers	1921	1st term
Oxford South	Albert Thomas Walker	United Farmers	1919	1st term
Parkdale	William Herbert Price	Conservative	1914	2nd term
Parry Sound	Richard Reese Hall	Liberal	1919	1st term
Peel	Thomas Laird Kennedy	Conservative	1919	1st term
Perth North	Francis Wellington Hay	Liberal	1916	2nd term
Perth South	Peter Smith	United Farmers	1919	1st term
Peterborough East	Ernest Nicholls McDonald	United Farmers	1919	1st term
Peterborough West	Thomas Tooms	Labour	1919	1st term
Port Arthur	Donald McDonald Hogarth	Conservative	1911	3rd term
Prescott	Gustave Évanturel	Liberal	1911	3rd term
Prince Edward	Nelson Parliament	Liberal	1914	2nd term
Rainy River	James Arthur Mathieu	Conservative-Liberal	1911	3rd term
Renfrew North	Ralph Melville Warren	United Farmers	1919	1st term
Renfrew South	John Carty	United Farmers	1919	1st term
Riverdale	Joseph McNamara	Soldier	1919	1st term
Russell	Damase Racine (Note: died in 1921)	Liberal	1905	5th term
Russell	Alfred Goulet (1922)	Liberal	1922	1st term
Sault Ste. Marie	James Bertram Cunningham	Labour	1919	1st term
Simcoe Centre	Gilbert Hugh Murdoch	United Farmers	1919	1st term
Simcoe East	John Benjamin Johnston	United Farmers	1919	1st term
Simcoe South	Edgar James Evans	United Farmers	1919	1st term
Simcoe West	William Torrance Allen	Conservative	1917	2nd term
St. Catharines	Frank Howard Greenlaw	Labour	1919	1st term
Stormont	James William McLeod	Liberal	1919	1st term
Sturgeon Falls	Zotique Mageau	Liberal	1911	3rd term
Sudbury	Charles McCrea	Conservative	1911	3rd term
Timiskaming	Thomas Magladery	Conservative	1914	2nd term
Toronto Northeast - A	Henry John Cody	Conservative	1918	2nd term
Toronto Northeast - A	Alexander Cameron Lewis (1920)	Conservative	1920	1st term
Toronto Northeast - B	Joseph Elijah Thompson	Conservative	1919	1st term
Toronto Northwest - A	Thomas Crawford	Conservative	1894	8th term
Toronto Northwest - B	Henry Sloane Cooper	Liberal	1919	1st term
Toronto Southeast - A	John O'Neill	Liberal	1919	1st term
Toronto Southeast - A	John Allister Currie (1922)	Conservative	1922	1st term
Toronto Southeast - B	James Walter Curry	Liberal	1919	1st term
Toronto Southwest - A	Herbert Hartley Dewart	Liberal	1916	2nd term
Toronto Southwest - B	John Carman Ramsden	Liberal	1919	1st term
Victoria North	Edgar Watson	United Farmers	1919	1st term
Victoria South	Frederick George Sandy	United Farmers	1919	1st term
Waterloo North	Nicholas Asmussen	Independent Liberal	1919	1st term
Waterloo South	Karl Kenneth Homuth	Labour-United Farmers	1919	1st term
Welland	Robert Cooper	Liberal	1919	1st term
Wellington East	Albert Hellyer	United Farmers	1919	1st term
Wellington East	William Edgar Raney (1920)	United Farmers	1920	1st term
Wellington South	Caleb Henry Buckland	Conservative	1919	1st term
Wellington West	Robert Neil McArthur	United Farmers	1919	1st term
Wentworth North	Frank Campbell Biggs	United Farmers	1919	1st term
Wentworth South	Wilson A. Crockett	United Farmers	1919	1st term
Windsor	James Craig Tolmie	Liberal	1914	2nd term
York East	George Stewart Henry	Conservative	1913	3rd term
York North	Thomas Herbert Lennox	Conservative	1905	5th term
York West	Forbes Godfrey	Conservative	1907	5th term

== Timeline ==
15th Legislative Assembly of Ontario - Movement in seats held (1919–1923)
Party	1919	Gain/(loss) due to				1923
Party	1919	Death in office	Resignation as MPP	Byelection gain	Byelection hold	1923
United Farmers	44		(3)	1	3	45
Liberal	27	(2)	(1)		1	25
Conservative	25		(2)	1	2	26
Labour	11					11
Independent-Liberal	1					1
Farmer–Labour	1					1
Farmer-Liberal	1					1
Soldier	1					1
Total	111	(2)	(6)	2	6	111

Changes in seats held (1919–1923)
Seat	Before				Change		
Seat	Date	Member	Party	Reason	Date	Member	Party
Kent East	January 9, 1920	James B. Clark	█ United Farmers	Resignation	February 9, 1920	Manning William Doherty	█ United Farmers
Halton	January 10, 1920	John Featherstone Ford	█ United Farmers	Resignation	February 16, 1920	Ernest Charles Drury	█ United Farmers
Wellington East	February 4, 1920	Albert Hellyer	█ United Farmers	Resignation	February 23, 1920	William Edgar Raney	█ United Farmers
Toronto Northeast - A	March 3, 1920	Henry John Cody	█ Conservative	Resignation	November 8, 1920	Alexander Cameron Lewis	█ Conservative
Kingston	November 18, 1921	Arthur Edward Ross	█ Conservative	Elected to federal seat	February 6, 1922	William Folger Nickle	█ Conservative
Oxford North	November 18, 1921	John Alexander Calder	█ Liberal	Resignation	December 19, 1921	David Munroe Ross	█ United Farmers
Russell	December 2, 1921	Damase Racine	█ Liberal	Died in office	October 23, 1922	Alfred Goulet	█ Liberal
Toronto Southeast - A	January 6, 1922	John O'Neill	█ Liberal	Died in office	October 23, 1922	John Allister Currie	█ Conservative
