= Hearst ministry =

Cabinet of Ontario, 1914–1919

- 7th ministry of Ontario

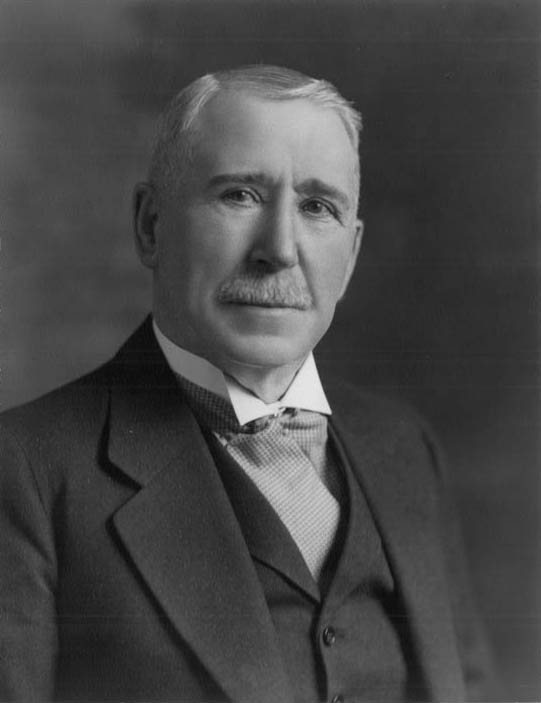
- The Hon. Sir William Hearst
- Date formed: October 2, 1914
- Date dissolved: November 14, 1919

People and organisations
- Monarch: George V
- Lieutenant Governor: John Strathearn Hendrie
- Premier: William Howard Hearst
- Member party: Conservative
- Status in legislature: Majority
- Opposition party: Liberal Party
- Opposition leader: Newton Rowell (1914-1917); William Proudfoot (1917-1919)

History
- Incoming formation: death of Whitney
- Outgoing formation: 1919 Ontario general election
- Election: 1919
- Legislature term: 14th Parliament of Ontario
- Predecessor: Whitney ministry
- Successor: Drury ministry

The Hearst ministry was the combined cabinet (formally the Executive Council of Ontario) that governed Ontario from October 2, 1914, to November 14, 1919. It was led by the 7th Premier of Ontario, William Howard Hearst. The ministry was made up of members of the Conservative Party, which commanded a majority of the seats in the Legislative Assembly of Ontario.

The ministry replaced the Whitney ministry following the death of Premier James Whitney. Hearst was appointed to the Premiership; he did not have to win a leadership election. The Hearst ministry governed through most of the later part of the 14th Parliament of Ontario.

Henry was defeated in the 1919 Ontario general election. He was succeeded as Premier of Ontario by Ernest Charles Drury.

== List of ministers ==
Hearst ministry by portfolio
Portfolio	Minister	Tenure	
Portfolio	Minister	Start	End
Premier of Ontario	William Howard Hearst	October 2, 1914	November 14, 1919
Minister of Agriculture	James Stoddart Duff	October 2, 1914	November 17, 1916
Minister of Agriculture	William Howard Hearst	November 17, 1916	May 23, 1918
Minister of Agriculture	George Stewart Henry	May 23, 1918	November 14, 1919
Attorney General	vacant	October 2, 1914	December 22, 1914
Attorney General	Isaac Benson Lucas	December 22, 1914	November 14, 1919
Minister of Education	Robert Pyne	October 2, 1914	May 23, 1918
Minister of Education	Henry John Cody	May 23, 1918	November 14, 1919
Minister of Public Works and Highways (Note: named "Ministry of Public Works" from April 8, 1915 to November 14, 1919.)	Findlay George MacDiarmid	April 8, 1915	November 14, 1919
Minister of Lands, Forests and Mines	William Howard Hearst	October 2, 1914	December 22, 1914
Minister of Lands, Forests and Mines	Howard Ferguson	December 22, 1914	November 14, 1919
Ministers; Without Portfolios			
Provincial Secretary and Registrar	William Hanna	October 2, 1914	December 19, 1916
Provincial Secretary and Registrar	William McPherson	December 19, 1916	November 14, 1919
Treasurer	Isaac Benson Lucas	October 2, 1914	December 22, 1914
Treasurer	Thomas McGarry	December 22, 1914	November 14, 1919
