= Mark Howard Irish =

Canadian politician from Ontario

Member of the Ontario Provincial Parliament for Toronto Northeast Seat B
- In office June 29, 1914 – September 23, 1919 Serving with Robert Allan Pyne
- Preceded by: constituency established
- Succeeded by: Joseph Thompson

Personal details
- Party: Conservative

Mark Howard Irish was a Canadian politician from the Conservative Party of Ontario. He represented Toronto Northeast in the Legislative Assembly of Ontario from 1914 to 1919.

== See also ==
- 14th Parliament of Ontario
