= 14th Parliament of Ontario =

The 14th Legislative Assembly of Ontario was in session from June 29, 1914, until September 23, 1919, just prior to the 1919 general election. The majority party was the Ontario Conservative Party led by Sir James P. Whitney.

William Howard Hearst became party leader and Premier after the death of James P. Whitney in September 1914.

David Jamieson served as speaker for the assembly.

== Members of the Assembly ==
Riding	Member	Party	First elected / previously elected	No. of terms
Addington	William David Black	Conservative	1911	2nd term
Algoma	Albert Grigg	Conservative	1908	3rd term
Algoma	John Morrow Robb (1915)	Conservative	1915	1st term
Brant	Thomas Scott Davidson	Liberal	1914	1st term
Brant South	Joseph Henry Ham	Liberal	1914	1st term
Brockville	Albert Edward Donovan	Conservative	1907	4th term
Bruce North	William MacDonald	Liberal	1911	2nd term
Bruce South	Wellington David Cargill	Conservative	1914	1st term
Bruce West	Charles Martin Bowman	Liberal	1898	6th term
Carleton	Robert Herbert McElroy	Conservative	1907	4th term
Cochrane	Malcolm Lang	Liberal	1914	1st term
Dufferin	Charles Robert McKeown	Conservative	1907	4th term
Dundas	James Pliny Whitney	Conservative	1888	9th term
Dundas	Irwin Foster Hilliard (1914)	Conservative	1914	1st term
Durham East	Josiah Johnston Preston	Conservative	1902	5th term
Durham West	John Henry Devitt	Conservative	1905	4th term
Elgin East	Charles Andrew Brower	Conservative	1894	7th term
Elgin West	Findlay George MacDiarmid	Conservative	1898, 1900	7th term*
Essex North	Severin Ducharme	Liberal	1914	1st term
Essex South	Lambert Peter Wigle	Liberal	1914	1st term
Fort William	Charles William Jarvis	Conservative	1911	2nd term
Frontenac	Anthony McGuin Rankin	Conservative	1911	2nd term
Glengarry	Hugh Munro	Liberal	1911	2nd term
Grenville	George Howard Ferguson	Conservative	1905	4th term
Grey Centre	Isaac Benson Lucas	Conservative	1898	6th term
Grey North	Colin Stewart Cameron	Conservative	1913	2nd term
Grey South	David Jamieson	Conservative	1898	6th term
Haldimand	William Jaques	Conservative	1914	1st term
Halton	Alfred Westland Nixon	Conservative	1905	4th term
Hamilton East	Allan Studholme	Labour	1906	4th term
Hamilton West	John Strathearn Hendrie	Conservative	1902	5th term
Hamilton West	John Allan (1914)	Conservative	1914	1st term
Hastings East	Sandy Grant	Conservative	1911	2nd term
Hastings North	John Robert Cooke	Conservative	1911	2nd term
Hastings West	John Wesley Johnson	Conservative	1908	3rd term
Huron Centre	William Proudfoot	Liberal	1908	3rd term
Huron North	Armstrong Musgrove	Conservative	1908	3rd term
Huron North	William Henry Fraser (1918)	Liberal	1918	1st term
Huron South	Henry Eilber	Conservative	1898	6th term
Kenora	Harold Arthur Clement Machin	Conservative	1908	3rd term
Kent East	Walter Renwick Ferguson	Liberal	1911	2nd term
Kent West	George William Sulman	Conservative	1908	3rd term
Kingston	Arthur Edward Ross	Conservative	1911	2nd term
Lambton East	John Burton Martyn	Conservative	1914	1st term
Lambton West	William John Hanna	Conservative	1902	5th term
Lanark North	Richard Franklin Preston	Conservative	1894, 1905	5th term*
Lanark South	Francis William Hall	Conservative	1914	1st term
Leeds	John Robertson Dargavel	Conservative	1905	4th term
Lennox	Thomas George Carscallen	Conservative	1902	5th term
Lennox	Reginald Amherst Fowler (1918)	Conservative	1918	1st term
Lincoln	Thomas A. Marshall	Liberal	1898	6th term
London	Adam Beck	Conservative	1902	5th term
Manitoulin	Robert Roswell Gamey	Conservative	1902	5th term
Manitoulin	Beniah Bowman (1918)	United Farmers	1918	1st term
Middlesex East	John McFarlan	Conservative	1913	2nd term
Middlesex North	John Grieve	Liberal	1914	1st term
Middlesex West	John Campbell Elliott	Liberal	1908	3rd term
Muskoka	Samuel Henry Armstrong	Conservative	1912	2nd term
Muskoka	George Walter Ecclestone (1916)	Conservative	1916	1st term
Niagara Falls	George Musgrove	Conservative	1914	1st term
Nipissing	Henri Morel	Conservative	1908	3rd term
Norfolk North	Thomas Robert Atkinson	Liberal	1905, 1911	3rd term*
Norfolk South	Arthur Clarence Pratt	Conservative	1905	4th term
Northumberland East	Samuel Greerson Nesbitt	Conservative	1908	3rd term
Northumberland West	Samuel Clarke	Liberal	1898	6th term
Ontario North	William Henry Hoyle	Conservative	1898	6th term
Ontario North	John Wesley Widdifield (1919)	United Farmers	1919	1st term
Ontario South	Charles Calder	Conservative	1898, 1905, 1914	3rd term*
Ottawa East	Joseph Albert Pinard	Liberal	1914	1st term
Ottawa West	George Charles Hurdman	Liberal	1914	1st term
Oxford North	Newton Wesley Rowell	Liberal	1911	2nd term
Oxford North	John Alexander Calder (1918)	Liberal	1918	1st term
Oxford South	Victor Albert Sinclair	Conservative	1914	1st term
Parkdale	William Herbert Price	Conservative	1914	1st term
Parry Sound	Joseph Edgar	Conservative	1914	1st term
Peel	James Robinson Fallis	Conservative	1913	2nd term
Peel	William James Lowe (1916)	Liberal	1916	1st term
Perth North	James Torrance	Conservative	1905	4th term
Perth North	Francis Wellington Hay (1916)	Liberal	1916	1st term
Perth South	John Benneweis	Conservative	1911	2nd term
Peterborough East	James Thompson	Conservative	1908	3rd term
Peterborough West	George Alexander Gillespie	Liberal	1914	1st term
Port Arthur	Donald McDonald Hogarth	Conservative	1911	2nd term
Prescott	Gustave Évanturel	Independent-Liberal	1911	2nd term
Prince Edward	Nelson Parliament	Liberal	1914	1st term
Rainy River	James Arthur Mathieu	Conservative	1911	2nd term
Renfrew North	Edward Arunah Dunlop	Conservative	1903, 1911	4th term*
Renfrew South	Thomas William McGarry	Conservative	1905	4th term
Riverdale	Joseph Russell	Conservative	1914	1st term
Russell	Damase Racine	Liberal	1905	4th term
Sault Ste. Marie	William Howard Hearst	Conservative	1908	3rd term
Simcoe Centre	Alfred Burke Thompson	Conservative	1898, 1905	5th term*
Simcoe East	James Irwin Hartt	Conservative	1911	2nd term
Simcoe South	Alexander Ferguson	Conservative	1906	4th term
Simcoe West	James Stoddart Duff	Conservative	1898	6th term
Simcoe West	William Torrance Allen (1917)	Conservative	1917	1st term
St. Catharines	Elisha Jessop	Conservative	1898	6th term
St. Catharines	Frederick Raymond Parnell (1919)	Conservative	1919	1st term
Stormont	Robert Austin Shearer	Conservative	1914	1st term
Sturgeon Falls	Zotique Mageau	Liberal	1911	2nd term
Sudbury	Charles McCrea	Conservative	1911	2nd term
Timiskaming	Thomas Magladery	Conservative	1914	1st term
Toronto Northeast - A	Robert Allan Pyne	Conservative	1898	6th term
Toronto Northeast - A	Henry John Cody (1918)	Conservative	1918	1st term
Toronto Northeast - B	Mark Howard Irish	Conservative	1914	1st term
Toronto Northwest - A	Thomas Crawford	Conservative	1894	7th term
Toronto Northwest - B	William David McPherson	Conservative	1908	3rd term
Toronto Southeast - A	Edward William James Owens	Conservative	1911	2nd term
Toronto Southeast - B	Thomas Hook	Conservative	1914	1st term
Toronto Southwest - A	James Joseph Foy	Conservative	1898	6th term
Toronto Southwest - A	Herbert Hartley Dewart (1916)	Liberal	1916	1st term
Toronto Southwest - B	George Horace Gooderham	Conservative	1908	3rd term
Victoria North	Robert Mercer Mason	Conservative	1909	3rd term
Victoria South	John Carew	Conservative	1914	1st term
Waterloo North	Charles Henry Mills	Conservative	1912	2nd term
Waterloo South	Zachariah Adam Hall	Conservative	1914	1st term
Welland	Donald Sharpe	Conservative	1914	1st term
Wellington East	Udney Richardson	Liberal	1911	2nd term
Wellington South	Samuel Carter	Liberal-Prohibitionist	1914	1st term
Wellington West	William Clarke Chambers	Conservative	1911	2nd term
Wentworth North	Arthur Frederick Rykert	Conservative	1914	1st term
Wentworth South	James Thomas Hammill Regan	Conservative	1911	2nd term
Windsor	James Craig Tolmie	Liberal	1914	1st term
York East	George Stewart Henry	Conservative	1913	2nd term
York North	Thomas Herbert Lennox	Conservative	1905	4th term
York West	Forbes Godfrey	Conservative	1907	4th term

== Timeline ==
14th Legislative Assembly of Ontario - Movement in seats held (1914-1919)
Party	1914	Gain/(loss) due to				1919
Party	1914	Death in office	Resignation as MPP	Byelection gain	Byelection hold	1919
Conservative	84	(8)	(5)		8	79
Liberal	24		(1)	3	1	27
United Farmers	–			2		2
Independent Liberal	1					1
Labour	1					1
Liberal-Temperance	1					1
Total	111	(8)	(6)	5	9	111

Changes in seats held (1914–1919)
Seat	Before				Change		
Seat	Date	Member	Party	Reason	Date	Member	Party
Hamilton West	September 25, 1914	John Strathearn Hendrie	█ Conservative	Appointed Lieutenant Governor	November 18, 1914	John Allan	█ Conservative
Dundas	September 25, 1914	James Pliny Whitney	█ Conservative	Died in office	December 7, 1914	Irwin Foster Hilliard	█ Conservative
Algoma	October 7, 1915	Albert Grigg	█ Conservative	Appointed Deputy Minister	February 24, 1916	John Morrow Robb	█ Conservative
Peel	January 28, 1916	James Robinson Fallis	█ Conservative	Resigned to contest by-election	February 24, 1916	William James Lowe	█ Liberal
Muskoka	May 15, 1916	Samuel Henry Armstrong	█ Conservative	Died in office	June 12, 1916	George Walter Ecclestone	█ Conservative
Perth North	June 13, 1916	James Torrance	█ Conservative	Accepted federal Customs appointment	July 10, 1916	Francis Wellington Hay	█ Liberal
Toronto Southwest - A	June 13, 1916	James Joseph Foy	█ Conservative	Died in office	August 21, 1916	Herbert Hartley Dewart	█ Liberal
Simcoe West	November 17, 1916	James Stoddart Duff	█ Conservative	Died in office	January 15, 1917	William Torrance Allen	█ Conservative
Lennox	March 15, 1917	Thomas George Carscallen	█ Conservative	Died in office	August 29, 1918	Reginald Amherst Fowler	█ Conservative
Manitoulin	March 19, 1917	Robert Roswell Gamey	█ Conservative	Died in office	October 24, 1918	Beniah Bowman	█ United Farmers
Toronto Northeast - A	May 23, 1918	Robert Allan Pyne	█ Conservative	Accepted municipal appointment	August 19, 1918	Henry John Cody	█ Conservative
Oxford North	September 6, 1918	Newton Wesley Rowell	█ Liberal	Entered federal politics	September 23, 1918	John Alexander Calder	█ Liberal
Ontario North	October 27, 1918	William Henry Hoyle	█ Conservative	Died in office	February 18, 1919	John Wesley Widdifield	█ United Farmers
St. Catharines	October 24, 1918	Elisha Jessop	█ Conservative	Died in office	February 15, 1919	Frederick Raymond Parnell	█ Conservative
