= Whitney ministry =

Cabinet of Ontario, 1905–1914

- ministry of Ontario

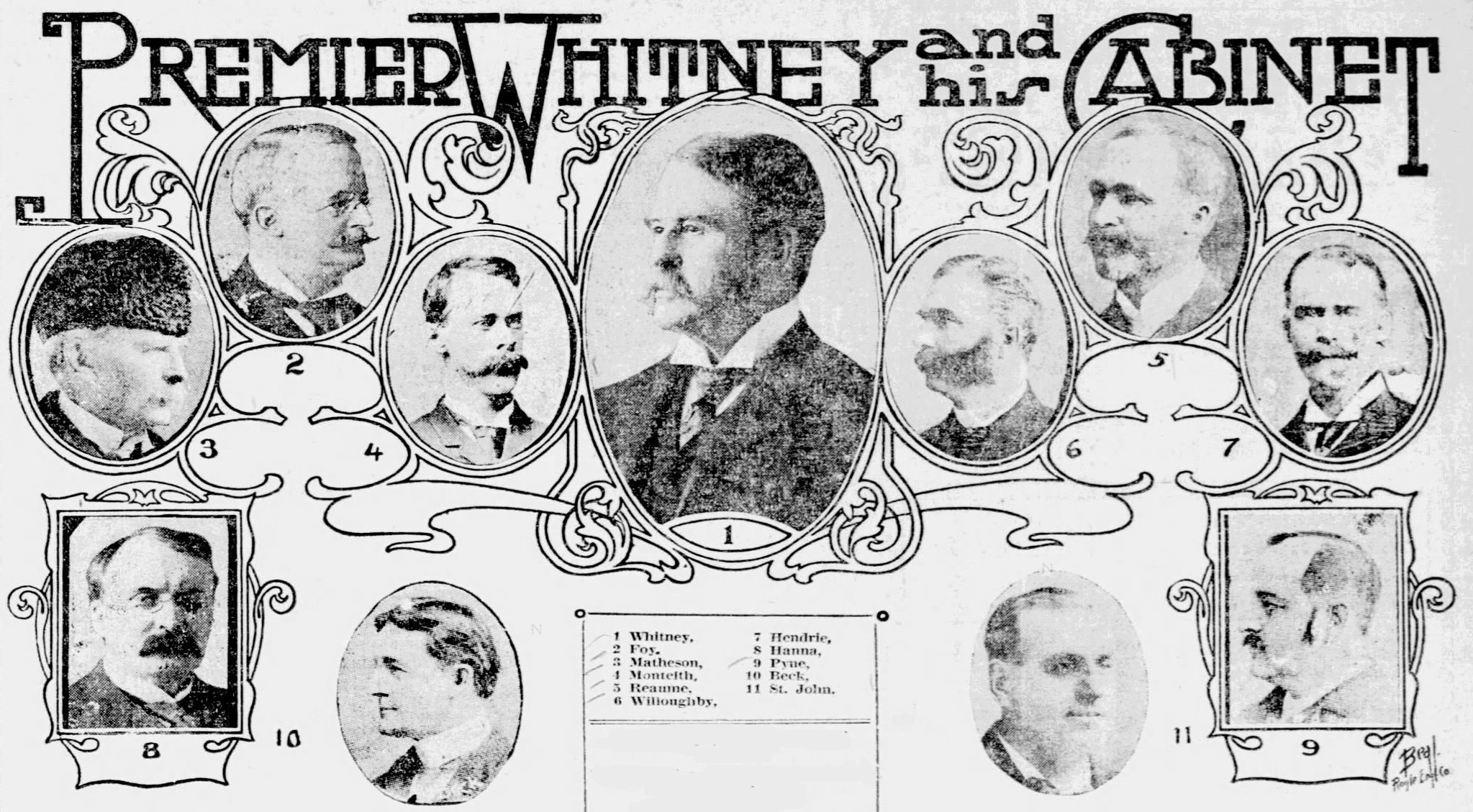
- Whitney Ministry, upon entering office
- Date formed: February 8, 1905
- Date dissolved: October 2, 1914

People and organisations
- Monarch: Edward VII (d.1910); George V
- Lieutenant Governor: William Mortimer Clark (1905-08); John Morison Gibson (1908-14); John Strathearn Hendrie (1914)
- Premier: James Whitney
- Total no. of members: 15
- Member party: Conservative
- Status in legislature: Majority
- Opposition party: Liberal Party
- Opposition leader: George Ross (1905-07); George Graham (1907); A.G. MacKay (1907–11); Newton Rowell (1911–17)

History
- Incoming formation: 1905 Ontario general election
- Outgoing formation: death of Whitney
- Elections: 1905, 1908, 1911, 1914
- Legislature term: 11th, 12th, 13th, 14th Parliaments
- Predecessor: Ross ministry
- Successor: Hearst ministry

The Whitney ministry was the cabinet (formally the Executive Council of Ontario) that led the Government of Ontario from February 8, 1905, to October 2, 1914. Led by the Ontario's 6th Premier, James Whitney, the ministry consisted of members of the Conservative Party, which commanded a majority of the seats in the Legislative Assembly of Ontario for the entire duration of the ministry.

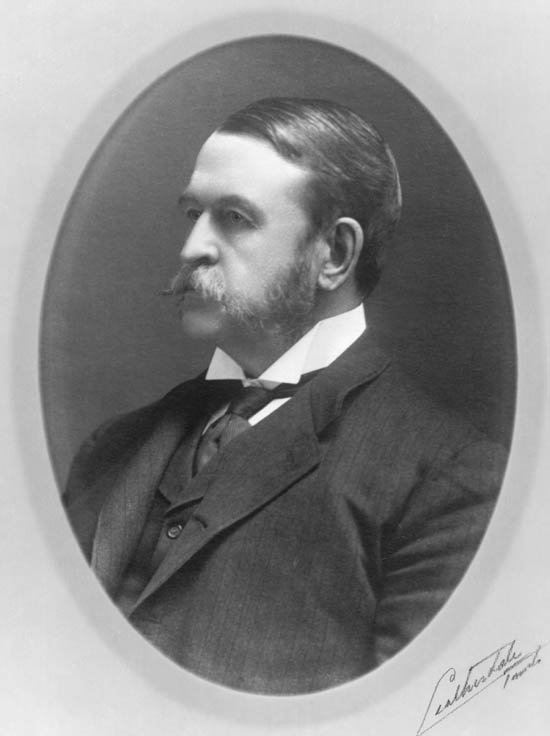
The Hon. Sir James Pliny Whitney

After thirty-four years opposition, the ministry replaced the Liberal Ross ministry upon the Conservative Party's resounding victory in the 1905 Ontario general election. Premier Whitney led the Conservative Party into three more election campaigns, renewing their governing mandates with majority victories in 1908, 1911, 1914. The Whitney ministry governed through the 11th, 12th, and 13th Parliament of Ontario as well as the first several weeks of the 14th Parliament of Ontario.

Whitney died on September 25, 1914, just three months after his last electoral victory. He was succeeded a week later as Premier of Ontario by William Howard Hearst, known as the "baby minister" of the Whitney ministry, who joined the ministry in 1911. Accordingly, on October 2, 1914, the Whitney ministry was dissolved and was succeeded by the Hearst ministry.

== Organization ==
Soon after Premier Whitney took office in 1905, he renamed the two commissioner titles to ministers. He also created a new department, the Office of the President of the Executive Council, ending the practice of having the first minister being serviced by the attorney general's office. The departments, the eighth formally recognized ministerial portfolio in the provincial government, enable the premier to draw ministerial salary without simultaneously holding an operational portfolio.A separate expense line was added to the supply bill for 1907 to provide a budget for the "Premier and President of Executive Council Department". that year The new department providing support to the premier and was very modest at the time, one of the smallest agencies of the government, consisting of just two senior aides, one junior aide, and a stenographer.

== Ministers ==
In addition to the ten inaugural members, five additional members joined the ministry over its tenure.

Some notable appointments by Whitney:

- Sir Adam Beck, who laid the foundation for Ontario's electricity supply and its public ownership, held a seat as a minsiter without portfolio throughout Whitney's ministry and again in the Ferguson minister in the last two years of his life, and was routinely referred to as the hydro minister or electricity minister in the press. He launched an unsuccessful bid for leadership following Whitney's death, and was dropped from cabiet by Whitney's successor William Hearst and lost his seat in 1919. He was however retained as chair of the hydro commission by both Hearst and the United Farmers Premier Ernest Drury, and was the only member of the Whitney ministry to serve again in the Ferguson ministry upon the Conservative's return to power.
- Joseph Octave Reaume, the Minister of Public Works, was the second Francophone to join the Ontario ministry (first being Alfred Évanturel who served in the final three months of the predecessor Liberal ministry); he was left with the unenviable task of defending Regulation 17, when the ministry sought to cater to the powerful Orangeman force and imposed severe restrictions on all French instruction in the province's bilingual elementary schools

=== By senority ===
Continued service in the Hearst ministry Did not continue in the Hearst ministry † Died in office

Minister	Ministerial Service			Parliamentary Service			Notes
Minister	Start	End	Timespan	Electoral District	Region	1st	Notes
James Whitney	February 8, 1905	† Sep 25, 1914		Dundas	East	1888	
William Arnson Willoughby	February 8, 1905	† April 28, 1908		Northumberland East	Midland	1886	
Arthur Matheson	February 8, 1905	† Jan 25, 1913		Lanark South	East	1894	
James Joseph "J.J." Foy	February 8, 1905	Dec 22, 1914		Toronto South (Note: later Toronto North and then Toronto Southwest)	Toronto	1898	
Robert Allan Pyne	February 8, 1905	May 23, 1918		Toronto East	Toronto	1898	
Samuel Nelson Monteith	February 8, 1905	October 6, 1908		Perth South	Southwest	1899	(Note: Electoral defeat)
Adam Beck	February 8, 1905	October 2, 1914		London	Southwest	1902	(Note: Member of later Ferguson ministry)
William John Hanna	February 8, 1905	Dec 19, 1916		Lambton West	Southwest	1902	
John Strathearn Hendrie	February 8, 1905	October 2, 1914		Hamilton West	Central	1902	(Note: Appointed Lieutenant Governor, sworn into office immediately after predecessor governor John Morison Gibson completed the swearing-in of the Hearst ministry)
Joseph Octave Reaume	February 8, 1905	October 2, 1914		Essex North	Southwest	1902	(Note: Electoral defeat)
Francis Cochrane	May 30, 1905	Oct 12, 1911		Nipissing East (Note: After 1908, Sudbury)	North	1905	(Note: Joined dominion Borden ministry as Minister of Railways and Canals and continued as minister without portfolio in the Unionist ministry until his death on September 22, 1919)
James Stoddart Duff	October 6, 1908	Nov 17, 1916		Simcoe West	Central	1898	
Isaac Benson Lucas	June 3, 1909	Nov 14, 1919		Grey Centre	Southwest	1898	
William Howard Hearst	October 12, 1911	Nov 14, 1919		Sault Ste. Marie	North	1908	
Richard Franklin Preston	Feb 18, 1914	Nov 14, 1919		Lanark North	East	1894	

=== By portfolio ===
Portfolio	Minister	Tenure	
Portfolio	Minister	Start	End
Premier and President of the Council (from 1907, Prime Minister and President of the Council) (Note: The departmental name listed in Supply Act 1907 for funding that year was the "Office of the Prime Minister and President of the Council")	James Whitney	February 8, 1905	† September 25, 1914
Attorney General	James Whitney	February 8, 1905	May 30, 1905
Attorney General	James Joseph "J.J." Foy	May 30, 1905	October 2, 1914
Treasurer	Arthur Matheson	February 8, 1905	† January 25, 1913
Treasurer	Isaac Benson Lucas	acting from no later than Jan. 31, 1913	
Treasurer	Isaac Benson Lucas	May 13, 1913	October 2, 1914
Provincial Secretary and Registrar	William John Hanna	February 8, 1905	October 2, 1914
Minister of Agriculture	Samuel Nelson Monteith	February 8, 1905	October 6, 1908
Minister of Agriculture	James Stoddart Duff	October 6, 1908	October 2, 1914
Commissioner of Crown Lands	James Joseph "J.J." Foy	February 8, 1905	May 30, 1905
Minister of Lands and Mines	Francis Cochrane	May 30, 1905	April 27, 1906
Minister of Lands, Forests and Mines	Francis Cochrane	April 27, 1906	October 12, 1911
Minister of Lands, Forests and Mines	William Howard Hearst	October 12, 1911	October 2, 1914
Minister or Education	Robert Allan Pyne	February 8, 1905	October 2, 1914
Commissioner of Public Works	Joseph Octave Reaume	February 8, 1905	May 25, 1905
Minister of Public Works	Joseph Octave Reaume	May 25, 1905	October 2, 1914
Ministers without Portfolio	Adam Beck	February 8, 1905	October 2, 1914
Ministers without Portfolio	John Strathearn Hendrie	February 8, 1905	October 2, 1914
Ministers without Portfolio	William Arnson Willoughby	February 8, 1905	† April 28, 1908
Ministers without Portfolio	Isaac Benson Lucas	June 3, 1909	May 13, 1913
Ministers without Portfolio	Richard Franklin Preston	February 18, 1914	October 2, 1914
