= 11th Parliament of Ontario =

Legislature of Ontario from 1905 to 1908

The 11th Legislative Assembly of Ontario was in session from January 25, 1905, until May 2, 1908, just prior to the 1908 general election. The majority party was the Ontario Conservative Party led by Sir James P. Whitney.

The Commissioner of Crown Lands became the Minister of Lands, Forests and Mines. The Commissioner of Public Works became the Minister of Public Works. An Electrical Power Commission was formed to consider the feasibility of delivering electrical power generated at Niagara Falls to industrial centres in the province.

Joseph Wesley St. John served as speaker for the assembly until his death on April 7, 1907. Thomas Crawford succeeded St. John as speaker.

== Members of the Assembly ==
Riding	Member	Party	First elected / previously elected	No. of terms	Comment
Addington	William James Paul	Conservative	1905	1st term	
Algoma	William Ross Smyth	Conservative	1902	2nd term	
Brant	John Henry Fisher	Conservative	1905	1st term	
Brant South	Thomas Hiram Preston	Liberal	1899	3rd term	
Brockville	George Perry Graham (Note: elected to federal seat)	Liberal	1898	3rd term	Leader of the Opposition from January 1907 to August 1907
Brockville	Albert Edward Donovan (1907)	Conservative	1907	1st term	
Bruce Centre	Hugh Clark	Conservative	1902	2nd term	
Bruce North	Charles Martin Bowman	Liberal	1898	3rd term	
Bruce South	Robert Edwin Clapp	Conservative	1905	1st term	
Cardwell	Edward Alfred Little (Note: resigned to accept appointment)	Conservative	1894	4th term	
Cardwell	Alexander Ferguson (1906)	Conservative	1906	1st term	
Carleton	George Nelson Kidd (Note: died in 1907)	Conservative	1894	4th term	
Carleton	Robert Herbert McElroy (1907)	Conservative	1907	1st term	
Dufferin	Frederick William Lewis	Conservative	1905	1st term	
Dufferin	Charles Robert McKeown (1907)	Conservative	1907	1st term	
Dundas	James Pliny Whitney	Conservative	1888	6th term	Premier in Whitney ministry also Attorney General in Whitney ministry before May 30, 1905
Durham East	Josiah Johnston Preston	Conservative	1902	2nd term	
Durham West	John Henry Devitt	Conservative	1905	1st term	
Elgin East	Charles Andrew Brower	Conservative	1894	4th term	
Elgin West	Findlay George MacDiarmid	Conservative	1898, 1900	4th term*	
Essex North	Joseph Octave Reaume	Conservative	1902	2nd term	Minister of Public Works in Whitney ministry
Essex South	John Allan Auld	Liberal	1896	4th term	
Fort William and Lake of the Woods	Thomas Smellie	Conservative	1905	1st term	
Frontenac	John S. Gallagher	Conservative	1898	3rd term	
Glengarry	John Angus McMillan	Liberal	1905	1st term	
Grenville	George Howard Ferguson	Conservative	1905	1st term	
Grey Centre	Isaac Benson Lucas	Conservative	1898	3rd term	
Grey North	Alexander Grant MacKay	Liberal	1902	2nd term	Leader of the Opposition after August 1907
Grey South	David Jamieson	Conservative	1898	3rd term	
Haldimand	Jacob Kohler	Liberal	1905	1st term	
Halton	Alfred Westland Nixon	Conservative	1905	1st term	
Hamilton East	Henry Carscallen (Note: died in 1906)	Conservative	1898	3rd term	
Hamilton East	Allan Studholme (1906)	Labour	1906	1st term	
Hamilton West	John Strathearn Hendrie	Conservative	1902	2nd term	
Hastings East	Edward Walter Rathbun	Independent Liberal	1905	1st term	
Hastings North	Josiah Williams Pearce	Conservative	1902	2nd term	
Hastings West	Marshall Bidwell Morrison	Conservative	1898	3rd term	
Huron East	Archibald Hislop	Liberal	1898	3rd term	
Huron South	Henry Eilber	Conservative	1898	3rd term	
Huron West	Malcolm Graeme Cameron	Liberal	1902	2nd term	
Kent East	Philip Henry Bowyer	Conservative	1905	1st term	
Kent West	Archibald Blake McCoig	Liberal	1905	1st term	
Kingston	Edward John Barker Pense	Liberal	1901	3rd term	
Lambton East	Hugh Montgomery	Conservative	1905	1st term	
Lambton West	William John Hanna	Conservative	1902	2nd term	Provincial Secretary and Registrar in Whitney ministry
Lanark North	Richard Franklin Preston	Conservative	1894, 1905	2nd term*	
Lanark South	Arthur James Matheson	Conservative	1894	4th term	Treasurer in Whitney ministry
Leeds	John Robertson Dargavel	Conservative	1905	1st term	
Lennox	Thomas George Carscallen	Conservative	1902	2nd term	
Lincoln	Elisha Jessop	Conservative	1898	3rd term	
London	Adam Beck	Conservative	1902	2nd term	
Manitoulin	Robert Roswell Gamey	Conservative	1902	2nd term	
Middlesex East	George Wesley Neely	Conservative	1905	1st term	
Middlesex North	Charles Constantine Hodgins	Conservative	1905	1st term	
Middlesex West	George William Ross (Note: named to Senate)	Liberal	1883	7th term	Leader of the Opposition until January 1907
Middlesex West	Duncan Campbell Ross (1907)	Liberal	1907	1st term	
Monck	Richard Harcourt	Liberal	1879	8th term	
Muskoka	Arthur Arnold Mahaffy	Conservative	1903	2nd term	
Nipissing East	Charles Lamarche (Note: resigned his seat)	Conservative	1905	1st term	
Nipissing East	Francis Cochrane (1905)	Conservative	1905	1st term	Minister of Lands, Forests and Mines in Whitney ministry after May 30, 1905
Nipissing West	Azaire Adulphe Aubin	Conservative	1905	1st term	
Norfolk North	Thomas Robert Atkinson	Liberal	1905	1st term	
Norfolk South	Arthur Clarence Pratt	Conservative	1905	1st term	
Northumberland East	William Arnson Willoughby	Conservative	1886, 1888, 1902	6th term*	
Northumberland West	Samuel Clarke	Liberal	1898	3rd term	
Ontario North	William Henry Hoyle	Conservative	1898	3rd term	
Ontario South	Charles Calder	Conservative	1898, 1905	2nd term*	
Ottawa (Note: Ottawa had 2 seats)	George Samuel May	Liberal	1905	1st term	
Ottawa	Donald Joseph McDougal	Liberal	1905	1st term	
Oxford North	James S. Munro	Liberal	1904	2nd term	
Oxford South	Donald Sutherland	Conservative	1902	2nd term	
Parry Sound	John Galna	Conservative	1905	1st term	
Peel	John Smith	Liberal	1892	5th term	
Perth North	James Torrance	Conservative	1905	1st term	
Perth South	Samuel Nelson Monteith	Conservative	1899, 1905	2nd term*	Minister of Agriculture in Whitney ministry
Peterborough East	William A. Anderson	Liberal	1902	2nd term	
Peterborough West	Thomas Evans Bradburn	Conservative	1905	1st term	
Port Arthur and Rainy River	Hugh W. Kennedy	Liberal	1905	1st term	
Port Arthur and Rainy River	William Alfred Preston (1907)	Conservative	1907	1st term	
Prescott	Joseph Louis Labrosse	Liberal	1905	1st term	
Prince Edward	Morley Currie	Liberal	1902	2nd term	
Renfrew North	Edward Arunah Dunlop	Conservative	1903	2nd term	
Renfrew South	Thomas William McGarry	Conservative	1905	1st term	
Russell	Damase Racine	Liberal	1905	1st term	
Sault Ste. Marie	Charles Napier Smith	Liberal	1903	2nd term	
Simcoe Centre	Alfred Burke Thompson	Conservative	1898, 1905	2nd term*	
Simcoe East	James Brockett Tudhope	Liberal	1902	2nd term	
Simcoe West	James Stoddart Duff	Conservative	1898	3rd term	
Stormont	George Kerr	Conservative	1905	1st term	
Toronto East	Robert Allan Pyne	Conservative	1898	3rd term	Minister of Education in Whitney ministry
Toronto North	William Beattie Nesbitt	Conservative	1902	2nd term	
Toronto North	William Kirkpatrick McNaught (1906)	Conservative	1906	1st term	
Toronto South	J.J. Foy	Conservative	1898	3rd term	Minister of Lands, Forests and Mines in Whitney ministry before May 30, 1905; Attorney General in Whitney ministry after May 30, 1905
Toronto West	Thomas Crawford	Conservative	1894	4th term	Speaker after April 7, 1907
Victoria East	John Hilliard Carnegie	Conservative	1894	4th term	
Victoria West	Samuel John Fox	Conservative	1898	3rd term	
Waterloo North	Henry George Lackner	Conservative	1898, 1902	3rd term*	
Waterloo South	George Pattinson	Conservative	1905	1st term	
Welland	Evan Eugene Fraser	Conservative	1905	1st term	
Wellington East	James J. Craig	Conservative	1905	1st term	
Wellington South	Joseph Patrick Downey	Conservative	1902	2nd term	
Wellington West	James Tucker	Conservative	1896	4th term	
Wentworth North	Robert Adam Thompson	Liberal	1902	2nd term	
Wentworth South	Daniel Reed	Liberal	1905	1st term	
York East	Alexander McCowan	Conservative	1905	1st term	
York North	Thomas Herbert Lennox	Conservative	1905	1st term	
York West	Joseph Wesley St. John	Conservative	1894, 1902	3rd term*	Speaker until April 7, 1907
York West	Forbes Godfrey (1907)	Conservative	1907	1st term	
