= Alexander Cameron Lewis =

Canadian politician from Ontario

Member of the Ontario Provincial Parliament for Toronto Northeast Seat A
- In office November 8, 1920 – October 18, 1926 Serving with Joseph Thompson
- Preceded by: Henry John Cody
- Succeeded by: constituency abolished

Personal details
- Party: Conservative

Alexander Cameron Lewis was a Canadian politician from the Conservative Party of Ontario. He represented Toronto Northeast in the Legislative Assembly of Ontario from 1920 to 1926.

== See also ==
- 15th Parliament of Ontario
- 16th Parliament of Ontario
