= John Carman Ramsden =

Canadian politician from Ontario

John Carman Ramsden MC

Member of the Ontario Provincial Parliament for Toronto Southwest Seat B
- In office October 20, 1919 – May 10, 1923 Serving with Hartley Dewart
- Preceded by: George Horace Gooderham
- Succeeded by: Frederick George McBrien

Personal details
- Born: October 22, 1892 Detroit, Michigan
- Died: June 10, 1951 (aged 58) Toronto, Ontario
- Party: Liberal
- Relations: J. George Ramsden (father)

John Carman Ramsden MC (October 22, 1892 – June 10, 1951) was a Canadian politician and a decorated WWI veteran from Toronto, Ontario. He represented Toronto Southwest in the Legislative Assembly of Ontario from 1919 to 1923.

He was born in Detroit, Michigan to prominent Toronto municipal politician J. George Ramsden and Effie Lavinia (née Carman) Ramsden, and was brought back to Canada while still an infant. He attended Jesse Ketchum Public School and Jarvis Collegiate in Toronto.

== Service in WWI ==
Ramsden joined the cadet corps while a student at Jesse Ketchum. In 1915, with World War I in progress, he enlisted as a Private in the Canadian Expeditionary Force, and in 1916 joined the 3rd Canadian Infantry Battalion in France. He was severely wounded on two occasions and lost part of his left leg. In March 1918, he was awarded the Military Cross for gallantry, with the follow citations.

This Officer led with conspicuous gallantry and great determination a raiding party upon the enemy trenches on February 4, 1918, he leading the party across “No Man’s Land”. When discovered 20 yards outside the enemy wire he was severely wounded in the first onslaught of Bombs and, led his men over the enemy wire, although he was being met by machine-gun fire. When he reached the enemy trenches he was again severely wounded, this time in the ankle, and falling into a near by shell hole fainted. He lay in this shell hole between the German wire and the front line trench all the remainder of the night and the next day. Later he commenced to crawl along the wire to find a gap, finding one about 20 yards along the wire from where he was lying and passing through, crawled over 200 yards of ground, back to our front line. During this journey his wounds were giving him terribel [sic.] pain as he had about 12 wounds in his body, and his left leg was absolutely useless. Lieut. RAMSDEN’S great pluck, and stamina is a great example to every Officer and man in the Battalion. (This Officer’s foot has since been amputated). (A.F.W. 3121. 12–2–18)

Later in life he served as president of the Toronto Branch of the War Amputations of Canada.

== Electoral career ==
Upon his return home to Toronto, John Ramsden stood as the Liberal candidate for Seat B of Toronto Southwest in the 1919 Ontario provincial election. For much of the late nineteenth and early twentieth century, the Toronto city proper was a Conservative bastion politically (though the Liberals would from time to time be competitive in areas annexed or amalgamated into Toronto later). The Conservatives have achieved clean sweeps in every federal and provincial elections in the 20 years prior to 1919. The city last elected a Liberal MP 23 years earlier in Toronto Centre, the electoral district where Jack's father George Ramsden, a long time city council member, was beaten with a 50-point margin in the most recent dominion election.

1919 was however a change election. As a twice-wounded decorated veteran and a son of a prominent Liberal partisan whose recent calamitous defeat led credibility to the family's steadfast party loyalty, Jack Ramsden was well positioned to be a beneficiary of that year's political upset. In Toronto Southwest, a duo-member district, his candidacy drew significant coattail from two unique sources not available to other Liberal candidates. The 1917 defeat aside, Jack's father George was at the time a 7th term incumbent city councillor representing a ward that overlapped significantly with Toronto Southwest. His Liberal running mate Hartley Dewart, whose byelection victory in 1916 secured the Liberal Party a foothold in the city, won the party's first leadership convention held in June 1919 and thus enjoyed additional prominence. In what must have been a dizzying month, Jack Ramsden was duly elected MPP on October 20, 1919, just over two weeks after being married to Gladys Alma Scott, and two days before his 27th birthday.

Jack Ramsden was one of 18 returned soldiers elected to the legislature in that election. Dewart effective prosecution of the Conservatives help secured a Liberal breakthrough in Toronto capturing 5 of the city's 10 seats. Across the province however, Conservative losses did not translate to Liberal gains, as discontent voters abandoned both traditional parties. The Liberal caucus Ramsden joined was only slightly larger than the one prior to the election, and remained the official opposition but to a new United Farmers led ministry.

Ramsden served one term and was defeated in the 1923 election, when all Toronto seats returned to the Tory's fold.

== Private Business Career ==
Ramsden worked briefly as an insurance broker prior to his election. He returned to the industry afterward.

Ramsden died in Toronto June 10, 1951.

== See also ==
- 15th Parliament of Ontario
