= Alex Lewis =

Alex or Alexander Lewis may refer to:

- Alex Lewis (linebacker) (born 1981), American football player
- Alex Lewis (offensive lineman) (born 1992), American football player
- Alex Lewis (musician) (born 1978), American musician with Yellowcard
- Alexander Lewis (mayor) (1822–1908), American businessman and mayor of Detroit, Michigan
- Alexander Lewis (actor) (fl. 2000s–2020s), Australian actor
- Alexander Cameron Lewis (fl. 1920s), Canadian politician
