= Drury ministry =

- ministry of Ontario

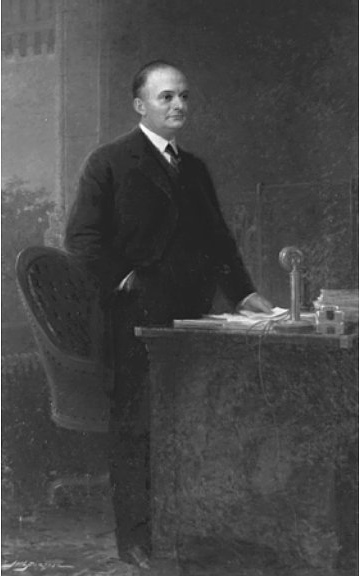
- The Hon. Ernest Drury
- Date formed: November 14, 1919
- Date dissolved: July 16, 1923

People and organisations
- Monarch: George V
- Lieutenant Governor: L.H. Clarke (1919–21); Henry Cockshutt (1921–23)
- Prime Minister: Ernest Drury
- Member party: United Farmers of Ontario; Independent Labour Party
- Status in legislature: Coalition in minority
- Opposition party: Liberal Party
- Opposition leader: Hartley Dewart (1919–21); Wellington Hay (1922–23)

History
- Election: 1919 (15th Parliament)
- Outgoing election: 1923
- Predecessor: Hearst ministry
- Successor: Ferguson ministry

The Drury ministry was the cabinet (formally the Executive Council of Ontario) that that directed the provincial government of Ontario, Canada Ontario from November 14, 1919, to July 16, 1923. It was led by Ernest Drury, the 8th Premier of Ontario. The ministry was a coalition made up of members of the United Farmers of Ontario (UFO) and the Independent Labour Party, together commanded the confidence of the Legislative Assembly of Ontario.

Although it was in power for only four years, its formation was of great historical significance. It definitively ended the operating assumption of the Liberal Party and the Conservative Party being the only viable contenders for power not just in Ontario politics but the politics of Canada and a number of provinces. United Farmers governments would follow in two other provinces shortly after, and the Progressive Party of Canada would emerge as a lasting third party of significance. While not exclusively, the political mantel of this coalition government was mostly inherited by the Cooperative Commonwealth Federation, the primary third party that emerged in the 1930s, while a smaller element went into power again by joining force with the Liberal Party to form the Hepburn ministry.

Drury was the first Premier of Ontario to be born after Confederation, though several members of his cabinet were born before.

The ministry replaced the Conservative Hearst ministry following the 1919 Ontario general election. The Drury ministry governed through the 15th Parliament of Ontario. After one term in office, the ministry, and the premier personally, were defeated in the 1923 Ontario general election. It was succeeded by the Ferguson ministry.

== A Premier is found ==
The 1919 election returned farmer candidates as the largest bloc, or plurality, in the provincial legislature. These MLAs were not members of a conventional party, but were associated with each other under the banner of the United Farmers of Ontario, a largely non-political farmers' organisation; thus they did not have a party leader.

The UFO caucus considered several candidates for the role of Premier of Ontario. Manning Doherty, a professor at Ontario Agricultural College and member of the Conservative party (though he had not run in the 1919 election), was considered for the Premiership because of his excellent leadership skills, but he was ultimately rejected because his Catholicism was a political liability; Peter Smith, elected MLA for Perth, was considered for his immense popularity in the caucus, but ultimately rejected because of his lack of leadership skills.

In the end, the UFO caucus asked Ernest Drury to lead them and take the position of Premier. Drury had been the president of the UFO when it was founded in 1913, but had since stepped away from that role. Also, he was the son of Charles Alfred Drury, Ontario's first Commissioner of Agriculture (serving 1888-1890) and was thus well-connected politically.

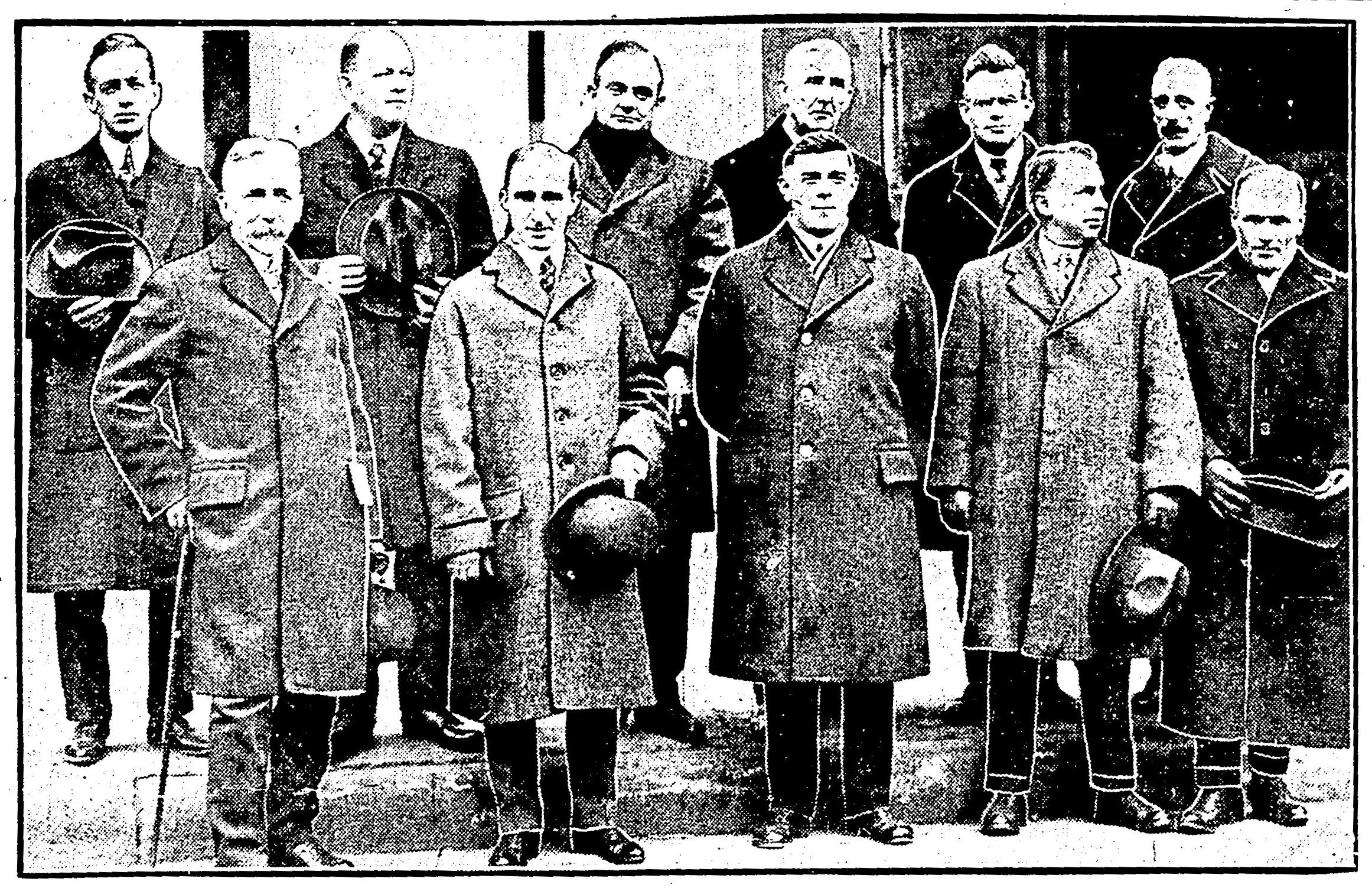
Members of the Drury ministry, on the day of swearing in, November 14, 1919

== Composition ==
The Drury ministry was formed on November 14. 1919. It consisted of eleven men, and its composition remain substantially the same for its four-year duration.

While not all minister were formally installed to their portfolio as some were not yet in existence, their intended assignments were all broadly communicated. For example, Harry Mills was initially officially sworn in as a minister without portfolio, but was styled as Minister of Mines in public communications. Walter Rollo was styled as Minister of Health and Labour. Smith would end up serving under Drury as Treasurer while Doherty served as Minister of Agriculture.

Drury, Biggs, Carmichael, Doherty, Nixon, and Smith represented the sprawling farmlands of Southwestern Ontario; Rollo and Raney represented the more urban interests of Hamilton and Toronto respectively; Bowman and Mills represented the frontiers of Northern Ontario; and Grant was the sole representative of Eastern Ontario.

=== List of ministers ===
Portfolio	Minister	Tenure	
Portfolio	Minister	Start	End
Prime Minister of Ontario; President of the Council	Ernest Drury	November 14, 1919	July 16, 1923
Provincial Secretary and Registrar	Harry Nixon	November 14, 1919	July 16, 1923
Treasurer	Peter Smith	November 14, 1919	July 16, 1923
Attorney General	William Raney	November 14, 1919	July 16, 1923
Minister of Agriculture	Manning Doherty	November 14, 1919	July 16, 1923
Minister of Lands, Forests and Mines (from June 26, 1920); Minister of Lands and Forests	Beniah Bowman	November 14, 1919	July 16, 1923
Minister of Mines	Harry Mills (Note: Mills was styled as Minister of Mines in public communications throughout. Legislation enacting the Department of Mines however was not in force until June 1920.)	June 26, 1920	July 16, 1923
Minister of Public Works and Highways	Frank Campbell Biggs	November 14, 1919	July 16, 1923
Minister of Education	Robert Grant	November 14, 1919	July 16, 1923
Minister of Labour	Walter Rollo	November 14, 1919	July 16, 1923
Ministers Without Portfolios	Dougall Carmichael	November 14, 1919	July 16, 1923
Ministers Without Portfolios	Harry Mills	November 14, 1919	July 16, 1923

Doherty would not be the only person brought into cabinet from outside the UFO caucus, as Drury appointed Toronto lawyer William Raney, a Liberal who also had not run in the 1919 election, to fill the role of Attorney General because there wasn't a single lawyer in the UFO caucus. Seats in the legislature were found for all three unelected cabinet members in the months after the 1919 election, as incumbent UFO MLAs stepped aside for them: Doherty would represent Peel, while Raney would represent Wellington East, both acclaimed without contest; Drury, alas, was forced to fend off a challenge from Edward Stephenson of the Soldier Party (with both Liberals and Conservatives declining to contest the seat). Drury emerged victorious with 67.7% of the vote. Stephenson was critical of Drury's qualified support of conscription in 1917, but Drury acquitted himself well before the voters.

While very few members of the UFO caucus had experience even sitting in provincial parliament, let alone serving on a ministry, many members had plenty of experience serving in municipal political office. Frank Biggs was recently Warden of Wentworth County, and previously had served as chair of several vital Wentworth County Council committees; he was named Minister of Public Works and Highways. Peter Smith, too, had put in his time in municipal politics.

The UFOs 49 MLAs joined with 11 Labour members to form a coalition government. To secure those vital eleven votes, Labour MLAs Walter Rollo and Harry Mills were brought into the ministry to serve as Minister of Labour and Minister of Mines respectively. The Department of Mines was split from the Department of Lands and Forests, a post which went to Beniah Bowman, one of few UFO caucus members with experience at Queen's Park.

The ministry was rounded out with the appointment of three more cabinet members: the youngest member, 28 year old Harry Nixon, was named to the position of Provincial Secretary; twice wounded former Lieutenant Colonel of the 157 Regiment Dougall Carmichael was appointed Minister Without Portfolio, albeit with an appointment to serve as government representative on the Hydro-Electric Commission; and Robert Grant was named Minister of Education.

== History ==
The Drury government had a significant impact on the Province:

- It introduced allowances for widows and children, a minimum wage for women, a mandatory weekly day of rest, broadened workmen's compensation benefits improved the support mechanisms for parents and children born out of wedlock, and standardized adoption procedures.
- Ontario Hydro saw greater expansion in the field of rural electrification and in 1921, Hydro acquired the Toronto Electric Light Company, together with various railway interests, thus making it the largest electric power system in the world.
- The Province of Ontario Savings Office was created, effectively a provincially-owned bank that was designed to lend money to farmers at a lower rate.
- It began the first major reforestation program in North America, and initiated construction of the modern highway system.
- Drury also arranged for a grant to Frederick Banting and Charles Best, at that time relatively unknown researchers, as a result of their discovery of insulin.
- The government was also a strict enforcer of temperance measures.
- Expenditures on highway construction were significantly increased.

Alas, there were signs that Drury's moinistry was struggling politically. There was a federal election in 1921, after the Drury ministry had been in power two years. Drury and his allies leant their support to the Progressive Party of Canada, and hoped to send around 40 Progressive MPs to Ottawa; in the end the Ontario delegate of Progressive totalled only 24. It was generally concluded that Drury's government had been a liability to the Progressives; it augured poorly for Drury's political popularity.

When Drury went to the polls in the 1923 Ontario general election, the number of farmer candidates returned fell from 44 to 17, although six of the nine farmer cabinet members were returned, with only Drury himself, Grant, and Smith going down to defeat. Labour only returned four candidates, and neither Rollo nor Mills were among them. Even the often sympathetic Liberal party lost several seats, falling from 27 to 14. Doherty would take over nominal leadership of the farmers' caucus, but would not even receive the consolation of appointment as Leader of the Opposition (the appointment went to Liberal William Sinclair), as new Premier Ferguson insisted that Doherty did not lead a formal party.

== Summary ==
While the ministry was just shy of commanding a majority of the seats in at Queen's Park, even with the support of Labour, several members of the fractured Liberal caucus, and even a few disaffected Conservatives, could often be counted on to support the ministry. Drury's position improved even more when Hartley Dewart was replaced as leader of the Liberal Party of Ontario and Leader of the Opposition by a much more accommodating Wellington Hay. There were even rumours that the UFO and Liberal caucuses might merge in the latter half of the Drury ministry, but such a course of action would be abandoned as farmer representatives drew a lot of support from rural Conservative voters who would never accept an alliance with the Liberal party.

Doherty, for his sheer talent, and Raney, for his tireless pursuit of the cause of temperance, were generally perceived as the most capable ministers.

Drury's ministry ultimately could not sustain its political base. Part of the reason for the erosion of support was the estrangement of more entrepreneurial, business-minded farmers from so-called "dirt-farmers" who had a completely different set of economic concerns. At the same time, so much of Drury's supporters were not interested so much in holding on to power, but in honest, efficient government; as such, the ministry lacked a certain survival instinct.

Drury's biographer Charles M. Johnston summarised the Drury ministry as follows, "It was the perceived values and standards of a Victorian yesterday that Drury and his colleagues sought to entrench through the actions of their government."

== Notes and References ==
- Froman, Debra, ed. (1984). "Executive Councils of Ontario". Legislators and Legislatures of Ontario: A Reference Guide. Vol. 1. Legislative Library, Legislative Assembly of Ontario. p. xxxiii-xxxiv.
- Johnston, Charles M. (1986). E. C. Drury: Agrarian Idealist. Ontario Historical Studies. Toronto: University of Toronto Press. ISBN 0-8020-3432-2.
- "All Members". Legislative Assembly of Ontario.
