= James Sweeny =

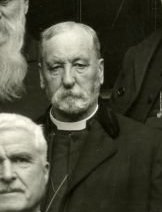
The Right Reverend James Sweeny c.1924

James Fielding Sweeny (1857–1940) was an Anglican bishop. He was the 4th Bishop of Toronto and Archbishop of Ontario.

== Biography ==
He was born in London, England on November 15, 1857, the son of Lt. Col. James Fielding Sweeny, formerly Her Majesty's staff officer of pensioners at Montreal, and his wife, Anna Maria Fielding.

Sweeny was one of ten children, and his brothers included George Robert Sweeny, a barrister of Toronto, Charles Sweeny, a Vice President of the C.P.R., and Roger Sweeny, Commandant of Her Majesty's Indian Army Staff College, and sisters Kathleen Chipman and Georgina, Lady Aylmer, wife of Arthur Lovell Aylmer, Lord Aylmer.

He was educated at the High School of Montreal, at McGill Normal School, and at McGill University (B.A., 1878; M.A. 1881), and pursued his theological studies at the Montreal Diocesan Theological College. He was ordained deacon and priest, by Bishop Bond. He received from the University of Trinity College, Toronto, the degree of M.A. and B.D. in 1883 and that of D.D., in course, 1885.

On his ordination in 1880, he became Rector of St. Luke's, and Chaplain to the Montreal General Hospital.

In 1882 he became Rector of St. Philips, Toronto. In 1883 he married Georgiana Bostwick, daughter of John Bostwick, Seigneur of Lanoraie. In 1889 he was appointed an honorary canon of St. Alban's Cathedral, Toronto, and was elected R. D. of Toronto in 1895. He was a member of the Council of the Toronto Church of England S. S. Association, and V.P. of the Toronto Church School. He has been also an active promoter of the Church of England Temperance Society.

In 1909 he was elected Bishop of Toronto and Rector of the Cathedral Church of St James succeeding Arthur Sweatman.

In 1923, he laid the cornerstone of Trinity College, on Hoskin Ave, built on a site purchased in 1913, but due to World War I construction was not begun until 1923. The architects were Pearson and Darling.

In 1932 he was elected Metropolitan of the Ecclesiastical Province of Ontario (Archbishop of Ontario)

Sweeny was awarded honorary doctorates from Bishops, Wycliffe, Kings and Windsor, Nova Scotia.

=== 1909 Toronto Episcopal election ===
The election following the death of Arthur Sweatman, Bishop of Toronto and Primate of the Anglican Church of Canada, was a hotly contested affairs between the traditional high church and the evangelical low church factions respectively backing Bishop George Thorneloe of Algoma and St. Paul's rector Henry John Cody. With neither candidate able to secure majority in among both clerical votes and lay votes, Sweeny, the archdeacon chairing the proceeding, emerged as the surprised compromised choice.

The election attracted a great deal more interest and partisan political flare in the press than Anglican elections ordinarily do, with the Globe, the Star, and the World all providing extensive coverage that was generally favourable to Cody's candidacy. The electoral synod, held at St. James's Cathedral and started on Wednesday February 17, 1909, took three days, seven ballots and a resolution conference. With 177 clerical votes (each held by an individual clergyman) and 128 lay votes (for each parish, to be determined by plurality of its three delegates, with the vote recorded as lost if the three votes went to three different candidates) available, a candidate must receive majority support from both electoral pools to be elected. The competitiveness of the contest was evident from the first ballot, in which Cody received 60 clerical and 67 lay votes compared to Thorneloe's 109 clerical and 51 lay votes. The following five ballots resulted in similar distribution, with majority of the lay delegates supporting Cody while majority of the clergy holding firm for Thorneloe.

Following the fifth ballot, a telegram from Thorneloe was read out, which indicated he had "neither authorized nor approved what is being done". Despite Thorneloe's protest, his tally only dropped to 98 clerical and 51 lay votes, while Cody made no gains. Through the first six ballots, Sweeny only received a handful of votes each. The synod adjourned after the sixth ballot on the second day, and on the third day agreed to appoint a committee with eight representatives of each of the two leading candidates to discuss a compromise solution. A seventh ballot was taken after the committee's deliberation, electing Sweeny with 153 clerical and 111 lay votes.
