= Toronto Northeast (provincial electoral district) =

Former provincial electoral district in Ontario, Canada

Ontario electoral district
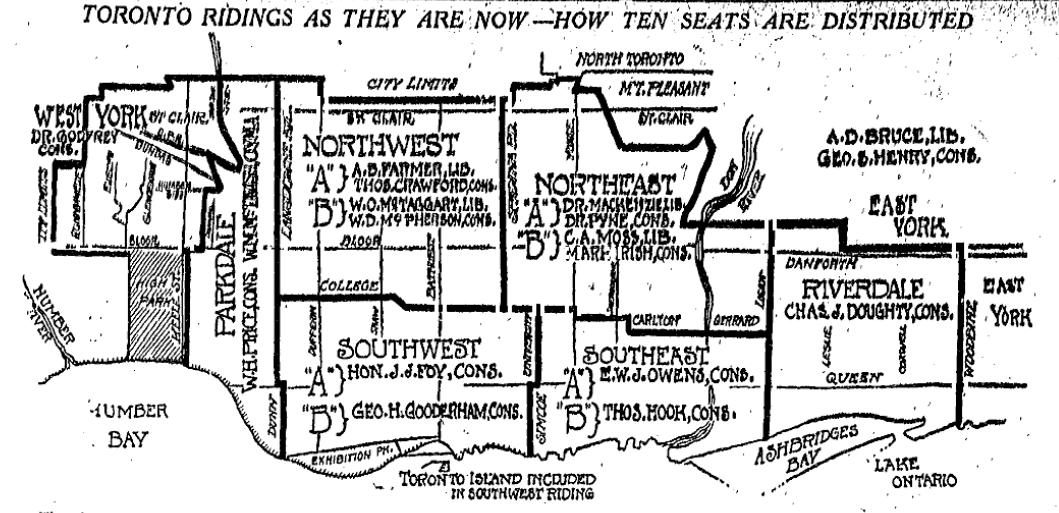
- Toronto Northeast in relation to other Toronto ridings in 1914

Defunct provincial electoral district
- Legislature: Legislative Assembly of Ontario
- District created: 1914
- District abolished: 1926
- First contested: 1914
- Last contested: 1923

Toronto Northeast was a provincial electoral district in Ontario, Canada, that existed from 1914 to 1926. It occupied an area north of College and Gerrard between University and Logan Ave. The district was a dual district in that it elected two members to the Ontario provincial legislature. Elections were run as separate races for Seat A and Seat B rather than a combined race. The members in the two-seat districts were elected using separate first past the post contests.

In 1926 a major redistribution of Ontario seats resulted in Toronto Northeast being split into four new districts called St. Patrick, St. George, St. David, and Eglinton.

== Boundaries ==
In 1914 Toronto Northeast was created out of the old Toronto North riding. It bordered College Street, Carlton Street and Gerrard Street East on the south. The western boundary was Spadina Road from College Street north to the city limits. The eastern boundary was Logan Avenue from Gerrard Street East to the city limits. The northern boundary followed the city limits from Spadina to Logan.

In 1926 a redistribution of Ontario seats resulted in Toronto Northeast being split into four new districts - St. Patrick, St. George, St. David, and Eglinton.

== Members of Provincial Parliament ==
Parliament	Years	Member	Party
prior to 1914 part of the Toronto North riding
Seat A
14th	1914–1918	Robert Pyne (Note: Resigned May 11, 1918 to accept an appointment as Clerk of York County.)	Conservative
14th	1918–1919	Henry Cody (Note: Resigned March 3, 1920 (no reason given).)	Conservative
15th	1919–1920	Henry Cody	Conservative
15th	1920–1923	Alexander Cameron Lewis	Conservative
16th	1923–1926	Alexander Cameron Lewis	Conservative
Seat B
14th	1914–1919	Mark Howard Irish	Conservative
15th	1919–1923	Joseph Thompson	Conservative
16th	1923–1926	Joseph Thompson	Conservative
		Sourced from the Ontario Legislative Assembly	
merged into the St. Patrick, St. George, St. David, and Eglinton after 1926

== Election results ==
Elections were run as separate races for Seat A and Seat B rather than a combined race.

=== Seat A ===
1914 Ontario general election
Party	Candidate	Votes (Note: 118 out of 122 polls reporting.)	Vote %
Conservative	Robert Pyne	5,768	58.6
Independent Liberal	B.E. McKenzie	4,104	41.4
	Total	9,872	

By-election August 19, 1918 (Note: This was the first election to allow women to vote, more than doubling the vote counts in each riding.)
Party	Candidate	Votes (Note: 7 polls not reported.)	Vote %
Conservative	Henry John Cody	9,135	68.0
Soldier-Labour	William Varley	4,297	32.0
	Total	13,432	

1919 Ontario general election
Party	Candidate	Votes	Vote %
Conservative	Henry John Cody	Acclaimed	

By-election November 8, 1920
Party	Candidate	Votes	Vote %
Conservative	A.C. Lewis	7,914	56.0
Liberal	W.H. Kippen	4,292	30.4
Grand Army of the United Veterans	J.Higgins	1,839	13.0
Independent	J. Galbraith	89	0.6
	Total	14,134	

1923 Ontario general election
Party	Candidate	Votes	Vote %
Conservative	Alex C. Lewis	7,147	57.4
Liberal	William H. Shaw	2,864	23.0
Progressive	N.S. Coyne	2,434	19.6
	Total	12,445	

=== Seat B ===
1914 Ontario general election
Party	Candidate	Votes	Vote %
Conservative	Mark Irish	5,500	56.8
Liberal	C.A. Moss	4,290	43.2
	Total	9,790	

1919 Ontario general election
Party	Candidate	Votes	Vote %
Conservative	Joseph Thompson	13,495	39.6
Liberal	Henrietta Bundy	8.685	
Independent-Conservative	A.T. Kelly Evans	8,172	
Labour	John W. Buckley	2,910	
	Total	33,262	

1923 Ontario general election
Party	Candidate	Votes	Vote %
Conservative	Joseph Thompson	13,930	77.5
Progressive	Mary Becker	4,046	22.5
	Total	17,976	

== See also ==
- List of Ontario provincial electoral districts
- Canadian provincial electoral districts
