= 1919 Ontario general election =

Canadian provincial election

- October 20, 1919

111 seats in the 15th Legislative Assembly of Ontario 56 seats were needed for a majority
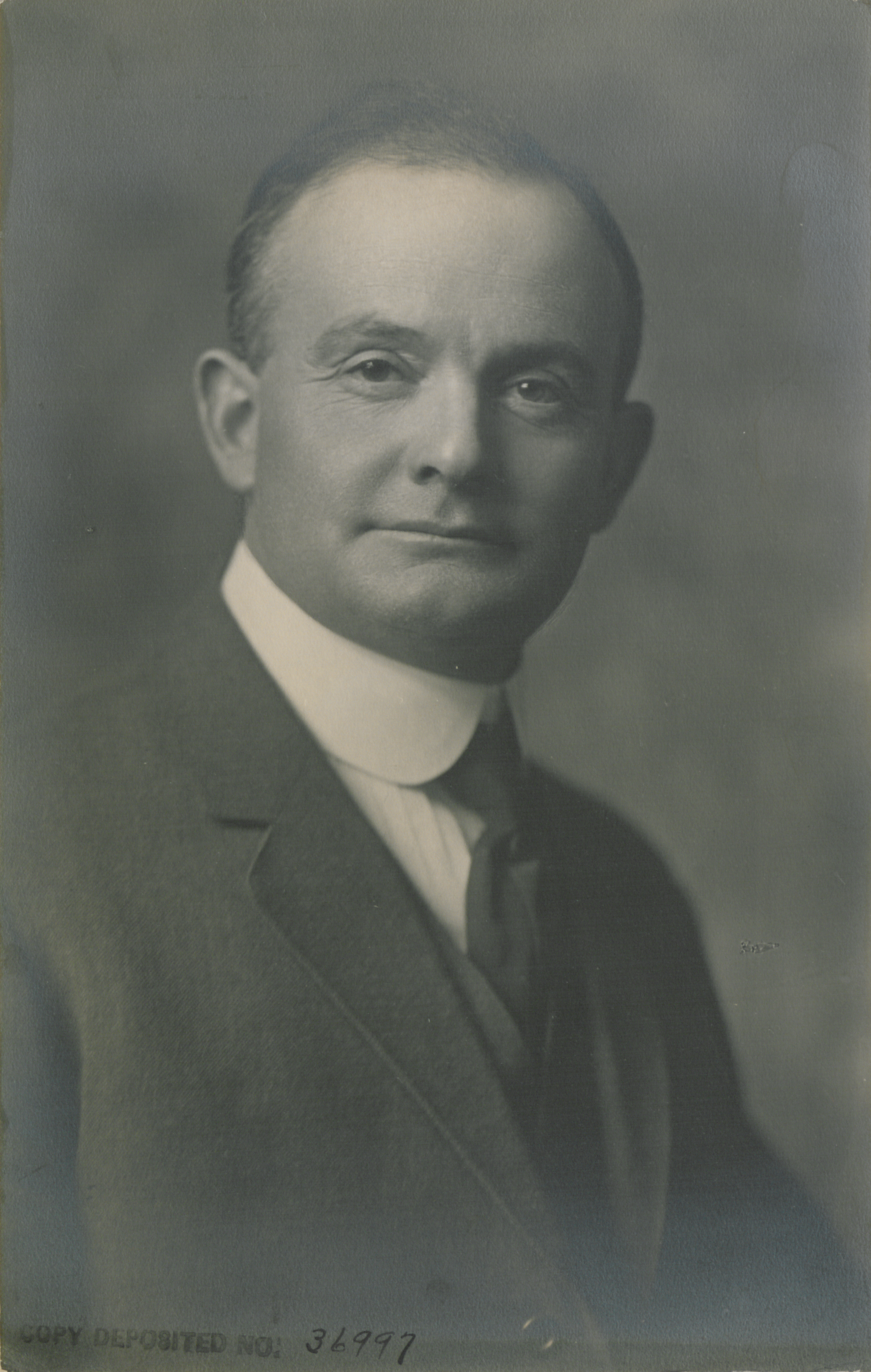

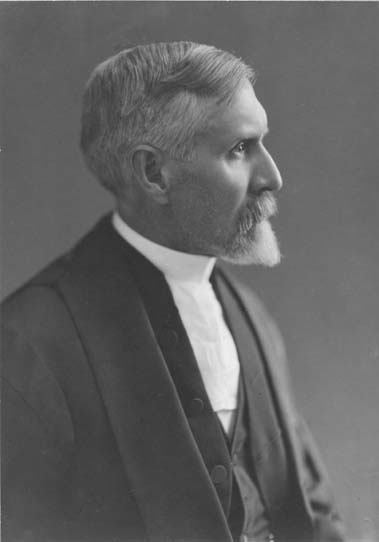

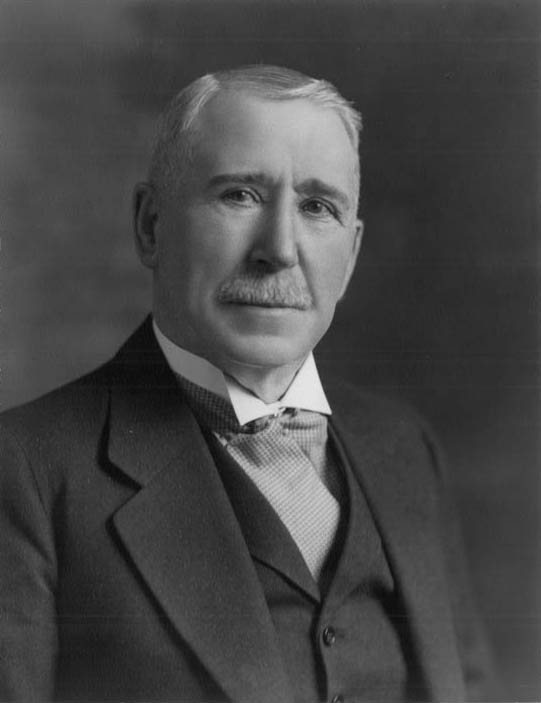

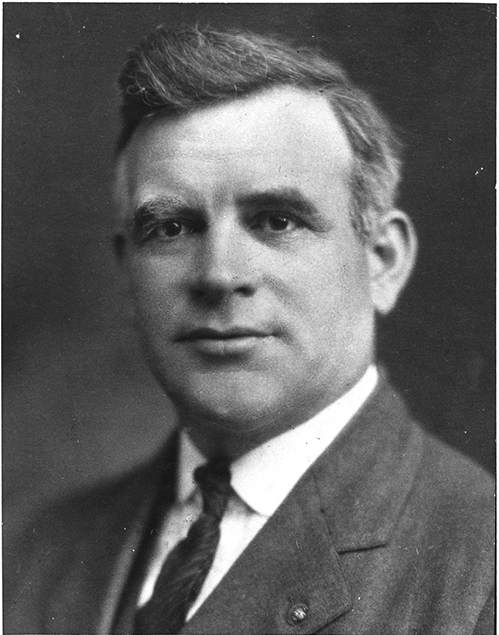
	First party	Second party
Leader	Ernest C. Drury	Hartley Dewart
Party	United Farmers	Liberal
Leader since	October 1919 (Note: named only after election)	June 26, 1919
Leader's seat	-	Toronto Southwest
Last election	pre-creation	24
Seats won	44	27
Seat change	▲44	▲3
Percentage	21.0%	25.5%
Swing	▲21.0pp	▼12.4pp
	Third party	Fourth party
Leader	William Hearst	Walter Rollo
Party	Conservative	Labour
Leader since	1914	-
Leader's seat	Sault Ste. Marie (lost re-election)	Hamilton West
Last election	84	1
Seats won	25	11
Seat change	▼59	▲10
Percentage	34.1%	9.1%
Swing	▼19.8pp	▲7.8pp
Premier before election
William Hearst
Conservative
Premier after election
Ernest C. Drury
United Farmers

The 1919 Ontario general election, held on October 20, 1919, elected 111 Members of the 15th Legislative Assembly of Ontario ("MLAs"). The United Farmers of Ontario captured the most seats but won only a minority of the legislature. They joined with 11 Labour MPPs and three others to form a coalition government, ending the 14-year rule of Ontario's Conservatives. This is one of the few examples of coalition government in Canadian history.

Premier William Howard Hearst had aimed to win a fifth consecutive term for the Conservatives, but instead the party became the first in Ontario history to fall from first to third place. As newspaperman John Willison later remarked, "There could not have been a worse time for a general election."

== Campaign ==
The parties tended to have a targeted approach in fielding their candidates:

Candidates in the contests in the ridings
Candidates nominated	Contests	Party												
Candidates nominated	Contests	Con	Lib	UFO	Lab	Ind	Farm-Lab	Ind-Lib	Ind-Con	Soc	Farm-Lib	Soldier	Sold-Lab	Totals
Acclamation	4	4												4
2	48	44	15	31	2	2			1		1			96
3	50	45	44	31	13	8	4	2			1	1	1	150
4	8	8	5	3	4	3	1	2	2	2		1	1	32
5														–
6	1	1	1	1	1			1		1				6
Total	111	102	65	66	20	13	5	5	3	3	2	2	2	288

Toronto was divided into four districts, each with two seats and two separate contests.

Toronto Northeast A saw a Conservative elected by acclamation. Toronto Northeast B saw a four-way fight. Toronto Northwest saw two two-candidate fights. Toronto Southeast had two two-candidate fights. The Toronto Southwest A contest was a two-candidate fight. Toronto Southeast B saw a three-way fight.

Acclamation victories occurred in the Toronto Northeast A contest, as well as in the Addington, Hasting North and Kingston contests.

It was the first election in which women could vote and run for office. (Note: Under Acts passed in 1917 and 1919 respectively.) Election day was also held on the same day as the scheduled referendum on prohibition.

=== Conservatives ===
Hearst alienated the business community with his progressive policies; he had a rift with Adam Beck (London) over the direction of the Ontario Hydro-Electric Commission; and his promotion of prohibition alienated the urban "wets".

Only the Conservatives attempted to field a full slate—and were helped by having four candidates being declared elected by acclamation—but about two dozen incumbents decided to step aside in favour of the local farmer candidates.

Seventeen Conservative MLAs either retired from the Legislature, or had failed to be renominated. Arthur Pratt (Norfolk South) opted to campaign as an Independent-Conservative, claiming earlier in the year that at least 27 MLAs privately opposed Hearst's prohibition policy.

Beck also decided to stand as an independent, saying, "I do not object to the Government having a control of the Hydro enterprise, but I object to its becoming a Government department; only as an Independent can I look after the interests of Hydro-Electric Power for the people of the Province in the most efficient manner."

=== Liberals ===
The Liberals split between those still loyal to former leader Newton Rowell and his successor William Proudfoot (Huron Centre), and those who supported the new leader, Hartley Dewart. John Campbell Elliott (Middlesex West) (who had come in 3rd in the 1919 leadership contest), joined by five others, decided to drop out of the race.

They tried to avoid direct contests with UFO candidates, fielding candidates in only 66 ridings as opposed to the 90 named in the 1914 election. In many respects, however, they underestimated the discontent that was simmering among rural Ontarians, and Dewart focused his attention unnecessarily against the Conservative campaign manager George Howard Ferguson.

Proudfoot opted to campaign as an independent.

=== United Farmers ===
The UFO focused on rural areas. Its leader, R.H. Halbert, did not campaign, as he had been elected to the House of Commons of Canada in an earlier by-election. It had only two incumbent MPPs, Beniah Bowman and John Wesley Widdifield, who had entered the legislature by winning by-elections in Manitoulin and Ontario North.

=== Labour ===
The labour political movement was fragmented between the Independent Labour Party, the Ontario section of the Canadian Labour Party, and the Ontario Labour Educational Association and its newspaper The Industrial Banner. The ILP was the effective organization on the campaign trail that year, and it promoted joint action with the UFO.

=== Media in the campaign ===
Media support in the campaign was mixed. The Globe and The Toronto Star, at that time both Liberal in outlook, were hostile against Dewart because of his stand on temperance issues. The Toronto World, generally a Conservative backer, pursued a simmering scandal from 1916 concerning International Nickel and alleged provincial support of wartime shipments of the metal to Germany via the cargo submarine Deutschland. The Farmer's Sun, recently acquired by the UFO, was an enthusiastic promoter of farmer policies.

== Electoral system ==
Of the 111 seats, 103 were from single-member constituencies elected through first-past-the-post voting. The remaining eight came from four dual-member ridings in Toronto, each of which had parallel contests voting separately for seat A and seat B, each under FPTP.

== Synopsis of results ==
Results by riding - 1919 Ontario general election (Note: "1919 General Election". elections.on.ca. Elections Ontario., affiliations adjusted with reference to Hopkins, J. Castell (1920). The Canadian Annual Review of Public Affairs, 1919. Toronto: The Annual Review. pp. 661–665. and "List of Ontario Nominations by Constituencies". Ottawa Citizen. October 14, 1919. pp. 1, 10.)
Riding	Winning party							Turnout (Note: including spoilt ballots)	Votes												
Riding	1914	1st place	Votes	Share	Margin #	Margin %	2nd place	Turnout	UFO	Lab	F-Lab	F-Lib	Soldier	Lib	Con	Ind	I-Con	I-Lib	S-Lab	Soc	Total
Addington	Con	Con	acclaimed																		
Algoma‡	Con	Lib	2,270	35.49%	44	0.69%	Con	68.60%	1,900	–	–	–	–	2,270	2,226	–	–	–	–	–	6,396
Brant North	Lib	UFO	3,597	44.21%	1,024	12.59%	Con	76.65%	3,597	–	–	–	–	1,966	2,573	–	–	–	–	–	8,136
Brant South	Lib	Lab	6,408	46.55%	2,377	17.27%	Lib	81.02%	–	6,408	–	–	–	4,031	3,326	–	–	–	–	–	13,765
Brockville	Con	Lib	4,866	56.47%	1,115	12.94%	Con	78.38%	–	–	–	–	–	4,866	3,751	–	–	–	–	–	8,617
Bruce North	Lib	UFO	3,689	54.08%	557	8.17%	Lib	76.91%	3,689	–	–	–	–	3,132	–	–	–	–	–	–	6,821
Bruce South	Con	Lib	2,727	41.88%	797	12.24%	UFO	79.97%	1,930	–	–	–	–	2,727	1,855	–	–	–	–	–	6,512
Bruce West	Lib	Lib	3,094	39.75%	101	1.30%	UFO	80.65%	2,993	–	–	–	–	3,094	1,696	–	–	–	–	–	7,783
Carleton	Con	UFO	4,877	56.24%	1,082	12.48%	Con	67.89%	4,877	–	–	–	–	–	3,795	–	–	–	–	–	8,672
Cochrane	Lib	Lib	2,951	49.24%	1,120	18.69%	Con	57.62%	–	–	–	–	–	2,951	1,831	–	–	1,211	–	–	5,993
Dufferin	Con	UFO	4,117	53.50%	538	6.99%	Con	77.71%	4,117	–	–	–	–	–	3,579	–	–	–	–	–	7,696
Dundas	Con	UFO	4,792	59.45%	1,524	18.91%	Con	76.17%	4,792	–	–	–	–	–	3,268	–	–	–	–	–	8,060
Durham East	Con	UFO	1,111	57.89%	303	15.79%	Con	24.10%	1,111	–	–	–	–	–	808	–	–	–	–	–	1,919
Durham West	Con	Lib	3,346	56.20%	738	12.40%	Con	77.42%	–	–	–	–	–	3,346	2,608	–	–	–	–	–	5,954
Elgin East	Con	UFO	4,937	59.47%	1,572	18.94%	Con	77.31%	4,937	–	–	–	–	–	3,365	–	–	–	–	–	8,302
Elgin West	Con	UFO	7,542	57.11%	1,879	14.23%	Con	73.01%	7,542	–	–	–	–	–	5,663	–	–	–	–	–	13,205
Essex North	Lib	UFO	6,486	71.09%	3,848	42.17%	Con	72.73%	6,486	–	–	–	–	–	2,638	–	–	–	–	–	9,124
Essex South	Lib	UFO	3,558	41.30%	130	1.51%	Lib	78.29%	3,558	–	–	–	–	3,428	–	1,629	–	–	–	–	8,615
Fort William	Con	Lab	3,745	51.48%	1,513	20.80%	Lib	63.70%	–	3,745	–	–	–	2,232	1,298	–	–	–	–	–	7,275
Frontenac	Con	Con	3,016	47.32%	509	7.99%	UFO	74.35%	2,507	–	–	–	–	–	3,016	850	–	–	–	–	6,373
Glengarry	Lib	UFO	4,554	66.65%	2,275	33.29%	Lib	60.12%	4,554	–	–	–	–	2,279	–	–	–	–	–	–	6,833
Grenville*	Con	Con	4,125	50.50%	81	0.99%	UFO	78.65%	4,044	–	–	–	–	–	4,125	–	–	–	–	–	8,169
Grey Centre	Con	UFO	4,363	52.87%	474	5.74%	Con	80.57%	4,363	–	–	–	–	–	3,889	–	–	–	–	–	8,252
Grey North*	Con	F-Lib	5,659	55.92%	1,198	11.84%	Con	77.18%	–	–	–	5,659	–	–	4,461	–	–	–	–	–	10,120
Grey South	Con	UFO	5,252	54.99%	953	9.98%	Con	75.87%	5,252	–	–	–	–	–	4,299	–	–	–	–	–	9,551
Haldimand	Con	UFO	6,056	59.83%	1,990	19.66%	Con	82.63%	6,056	–	–	–	–	–	4,066	–	–	–	–	–	10,122
Halton	Con	UFO	4,456	40.33%	1,054	9.54%	Con	76.89%	4,456	–	–	–	–	3,190	3,402	–	–	–	–	–	11,048
Hamilton East	Lab	Lab	16,012	60.24%	7,588	28.55%	S-Lab	71.16%	–	16,012	–	–	2,146	–	–	–	–	–	8,424	–	26,582
Hamilton West	Con	Lab	8,722	60.25%	4,643	32.07%	Con	71.54%	–	8,722	–	–	–	1,675	4,079	–	–	–	–	–	14,476
Hastings East	Con	UFO	3,641	51.22%	174	2.45%	Con	77.36%	3,641	–	–	–	–	–	3,467	–	–	–	–	–	7,108
Hastings North	Con	Con	acclaimed																		
Hastings West	Con	Con	5,072	52.19%	425	4.37%	Lib	74.80%	–	–	–	–	–	4,647	5,072	–	–	–	–	–	9,719
Huron Centre	Lib	Lab	3,193	38.65%	163	1.97%	Ind	78.39%	2,039	3,193	–	–	–	–	–	3,030	–	–	–	–	8,262
Huron North	Con	Con	2,897	37.61%	341	4.43%	Lib	81.66%	2,249	–	–	–	–	2,556	2,897	–	–	–	–	–	7,702
Huron South	Con	UFO	3,298	41.91%	774	9.84%	Con	80.89%	3,298	–	–	–	–	2,047	2,524	–	–	–	–	–	7,869
Kenora	Con	Lab	1,870	49.47%	975	25.79%	Ind	68.70%	–	1,870	–	–	–	405	610	895 (Note: Harold Machin campaigned for the anti-prohibition Liberty League)	–	–	–	–	3,780
Kent East	Lib	UFO	5,374	55.28%	1,026	10.55%	Con	81.83%	5,374	–	–	–	–	–	4,348	–	–	–	–	–	9,722
Kent West	Con	Lib	8,098	48.03%	2,919	17.31%	UFO	81.19%	5,179	–	–	–	–	8,098	3,583	–	–	–	–	–	16,860
Kingston	Con	Con	acclaimed																		
Lambton East	Con	UFO	4,575	53.09%	2,414	28.01%	Con	79.94%	4,575	–	–	–	–	1,882	2,161	–	–	–	–	–	8,618
Lambton West	Con	UFO	6,081	40.42%	1,299	8.64%	Lab	78.92%	6,081	4,782	–	–	–	–	4,180	–	–	–	–	–	15,043
Lanark North	Con	UFO	2,881	40.85%	83	1.18%	Con	77.84%	2,881	–	–	–	–	1,373	2,798	–	–	–	–	–	7,052
Lanark South	Con	UFO	3,872	48.18%	803	9.99%	Con	73.33%	3,872	1,096	–	–	–	–	3,069	–	–	–	–	–	8,037
Leeds	Con	Con	4,351	54.59%	731	9.17%	Lib	75.20%	–	–	–	–	–	3,620	4,351	–	–	–	–	–	7,971
Lennox	Con	Con	2,329	39.98%	314	5.39%	Lib	77.50%	1,482	–	–	–	–	2,015	2,329	–	–	–	–	–	5,826
Lincoln	Lib	Lib	3,242	39.39%	507	6.16%	UFO	77.33%	2,735	–	–	–	–	3,242	2,253	–	–	–	–	–	8,230
London	Con	Lab	13,008	53.94%	1,901	7.88%	Ind	77.34%	–	13,008	–	–	–	–	–	11,107	–	–	–	–	24,115
Manitoulin	Con	UFO	2,428	60.20%	823	20.41%	Con	69.06%	2,428	–	–	–	–	–	1,605	–	–	–	–	–	4,033
Middlesex East	Con	UFO	5,463	52.61%	2,963	28.53%	Lib	78.19%	5,463	–	–	–	–	2,500	2,421	–	–	–	–	–	10,384
Middlesex North	Lib	UFO	3,857	50.45%	1,696	22.18%	Con	80.98%	3,857	–	–	–	–	1,627	2,161	–	–	–	–	–	7,645
Middlesex West	Lib	UFO	4,394	75.59%	2,975	51.18%	Con	75.34%	4,394	–	–	–	–	–	1,419	–	–	–	–	–	5,813
Muskoka	Con	Con	3,054	46.22%	290	4.39%	Lib	64.48%	–	–	–	–	–	2,764	3,054	789	–	–	–	–	6,607
Niagara Falls	Con	Lab	4,057	38.37%	368	3.48%	Lib	74.20%	–	4,057	–	–	–	3,689	2,826	–	–	–	–	–	10,572
Nipissing	Con	Lib	3,122	42.44%	934	12.70%	Lab	68.88%	–	2,188	–	–	–	3,122	2,046	–	–	–	–	–	7,356
Norfolk North	Lib	UFO	4,522	63.09%	1,877	26.19%	Con	76.63%	4,522	–	–	–	–	–	2,645	–	–	–	–	–	7,167
Norfolk South	Con	UFO	3,280	62.67%	1,326	25.33%	I-Con	75.15%	3,280	–	–	–	–	–	–	–	1,954	–	–	–	5,234
Northumberland East	Con	UFO	4,521	50.49%	87	0.97%	Con	78.31%	4,521	–	–	–	–	–	4,434	–	–	–	–	–	8,955
Northumberland West	Lib	Lib	3,401	55.32%	654	10.64%	Con	74.01%	–	–	–	–	–	3,401	2,747	–	–	–	–	–	6,148
Ontario North	Con	UFO	4,162	54.12%	633	8.23%	Con	80.69%	4,162	–	–	–	–	–	3,529	–	–	–	–	–	7,691
Ontario South	Con	Lib	7,843	63.97%	3,425	27.93%	Con	74.11%	–	–	–	–	–	7,843	4,418	–	–	–	–	–	12,261
Ottawa East	Lib	Lib	7,309	63.57%	4,431	38.54%	Lab	61.09%	–	2,878	–	–	–	7,309	–	1,311	–	–	–	–	11,498
Ottawa West	Lib	Con	8,953	34.76%	1,097	4.26%	Lab	68.11%	–	7,856	–	–	–	6,526	8,953	2,423	–	–	–	–	25,758
Oxford North	Lib	Lib	5,369	47.61%	2,313	20.51%	Con	78.63%	–	–	–	2,852	–	5,369	3,056	–	–	–	–	–	11,277
Oxford South	Con	UFO	4,452	39.84%	617	5.52%	Con	81.37%	4,452	–	–	–	–	2,888	3,835	–	–	–	–	–	11,175
Parkdale	Con	Con	11,091	68.95%	6,096	37.90%	Ind	66.67%	–	–	–	–	–	–	11,091	4,995 (Note: John Hunter ran on the Prohibition ticket)	–	–	–	–	16,086
Parry Sound	Con	Lib	4,618	54.49%	761	8.98%	Con	72.58%	–	–	–	–	–	4,618	3,857	–	–	–	–	–	8,475
Peel	Con	Con	4,562	40.14%	105	0.92%	Lib	87.72%	2,345 (Note: Manning Doherty would be elected in a 1920 byelection in Kent East.)	–	–	–	–	4,457	4,562	–	–	–	–	–	11,364
Perth North	Con	Lib	6,095	41.63%	1,641	11.21%	F-Lab	78.39%	–	–	4,454	–	–	6,095	4,092	–	–	–	–	–	14,641
Perth South	Con	UFO	5,847	64.20%	2,586	28.39%	Con	—N/a	5,847	–	–	–	–	–	3,261	–	–	–	–	–	9,108
Peterborough East	Con	UFO	3,623	58.18%	1,019	16.36%	Con	67.85%	3,623	–	–	–	–	–	2,604	–	–	–	–	–	6,227
Peterborough West	Lib	Lab	4,732	41.49%	685	6.01%	Lib	74.25%	–	4,732	–	–	–	4,047	2,625	–	–	–	–	–	11,404
Port Arthur	Con	Con	2,578	41.33%	483	7.74%	Lib	67.91%	–	–	–	–	–	2,095	2,578	1,564	–	–	–	–	6,237
Prescott	I-Lib	Lib	3,929	47.43%	1,298	15.67%	UFO	68.70%	2,631	–	–	–	–	3,929	1,724	–	–	–	–	–	8,284
Prince Edward	Lib	Lib	4,557	55.78%	945	11.57%	Con	79.45%	–	–	–	–	–	4,557	3,612	–	–	–	–	–	8,169
Rainy River	Con	Con	1,420	40.00%	352	9.92%	Lib	63.53%	1,062	–	–	–	–	1,068	1,420	–	–	–	–	–	3,550
Renfrew North	Con	UFO	3,979	41.10%	230	2.38%	Con	79.80%	3,979	–	–	–	–	1,954	3,749	–	–	–	–	–	9,682
Renfrew South	Con	UFO	5,426	51.53%	322	3.06%	Con	70.52%	5,426	–	–	–	–	–	5,104	–	–	–	–	–	10,530
Riverdale	Con	Sol	7,472	38.84%	1,599	8.31%	Lab	—N/a	–	5,873	–	–	7,472	–	5,706	–	–	–	–	189	19,240
Russell	Lib	Lib	6,121	49.98%	1,174	9.59%	UFO	67.89%	4,947	–	–	–	–	6,121	–	1,180	–	–	–	–	12,248
St. Catharines	Con	Lab	6,313	48.67%	1,891	14.58%	Con	80.42%	–	6,313	–	–	–	2,235	4,422	–	–	–	–	–	12,970
Sault Ste. Marie	Con	Lab	4,444	59.11%	1,370	18.22%	Con	72.59%	–	4,444	–	–	–	–	3,074	–	–	–	–	–	7,518
Simcoe Centre	Con	UFO	5,234	57.89%	1,426	15.77%	Con	74.54%	5,234	–	–	–	–	–	3,808	–	–	–	–	–	9,042
Simcoe East	Con	UFO	5,063	40.78%	483	3.89%	Con	71.41%	5,063	–	–	–	–	–	4,580	–	–	2,773	–	–	12,416
Simcoe South	Con	UFO	2,927	53.68%	401	7.35%	Con	75.69%	2,927	–	–	–	–	–	2,526	–	–	–	–	–	5,453
Simcoe West	Con	Con	4,491	55.46%	885	10.93%	UFO	71.98%	3,606	–	–	–	–	–	4,491	–	–	–	–	–	8,097
Stormont	Con	Lib	4,284	43.01%	1,338	13.43%	UFO	68.28%	2,946	–	–	–	–	4,284	2,731	–	–	–	–	–	9,961
Sturgeon Falls	Lib	Lib	2,690	62.02%	1,798	41.46%	Con	67.33%	755	–	–	–	–	2,690	892	–	–	–	–	–	4,337
Sudbury	Con	Con	3,551	40.55%	142	1.62%	Lib	65.68%	–	–	1,798	–	–	3,409	3,551	–	–	–	–	–	8,758
Timiskaming	Con	Con	3,092	35.84%	77	0.89%	F-Lab	68.70%	–	–	3,015	–	–	2,520	3,092	–	–	–	–	–	8,627
Toronto NE - A	Con	Con	acclaimed																		
Toronto NE - B	Con	Con	13,495	40.57%	4,810	14.46%	Lib	61.10%	–	2,910	–	–	–	8,685	13,495	–	8,172	–	–	–	33,262
Toronto NW - A	Con	Con	18,797	53.93%	2,741	7.86%	Lib	—N/a	–	–	–	–	–	16,056	18,797	–	–	–	–	–	34,853
Toronto NW - B	Con	Lib	18,522	51.57%	1,125	3.13%	Con	—N/a	–	–	–	–	–	18,522	17,397	–	–	–	–	–	35,919
Toronto SE - A	Con	Lib	10,037	60.64%	4,585	27.70%	Con	—N/a	–	–	–	–	–	10,037	5,452	1,063	–	–	–	–	16,552
Toronto SE - B	Con	Lib	10,508	66.92%	5,313	33.83%	Con	—N/a	–	–	–	–	–	10,508	5,195	–	–	–	–	–	15,703
Toronto SW - A	Con	Lib	16,951	63.45%	7,186	26.90%	Con	54.34%	–	–	–	–	–	16,951	9,765	–	–	–	–	–	26,716
Toronto SW - B	Con	Lib	14,428	45.27%	4,800	15.06%	Con	55.57%	–	7,816	–	–	–	14,428	9,628	–	–	–	–	–	31,872
Victoria North	Con	UFO	3,348	57.94%	918	15.89%	Con	64.82%	3,348	–	–	–	–	–	2,430	–	–	–	–	–	5,778
Victoria South	Con	UFO	2,452	68.97%	1,349	37.95%	Con	30.95%	2,452	–	–	–	–	–	1,103	–	–	–	–	–	3,555
Waterloo North	Con	I-Lib	5,354	34.62%	2,141	13.85%	Lab	71.95%	2,211	3,213	–	–	–	2,974	1,487	–	–	5,354	–	225	15,464
Waterloo South	Con	F-Lab	8,074	55.49%	4,238	29.13%	Lib	76.00%	–	–	8,074	–	–	3,836	2,641	–	–	–	–	–	14,551
Welland	Con	Lib	5,183	49.03%	1,743	16.49%	Con	91.40%	1,949	–	–	–	–	5,183	3,440	–	–	–	–	–	10,572
Wellington East	Lib	UFO	3,279	45.08%	908	12.48%	Con	77.54%	3,279	–	–	–	–	1,623	2,371	–	–	–	–	–	7,273
Wellington South*	L-Tmp	Con	4,362	36.70%	120	1.01%	I-Lib	—N/a	3,060	–	–	–	–	–	4,362	–	–	4,242 (Note: Affiliation of Samuel Carter as reported in "Sam Carter for South Wellington". The Acton Free Press. October 9, 1919. p. 1.)	–	223	11,887
Wellington West	Con	UFO	3,379	54.60%	569	9.19%	Con	—N/a	3,379	–	–	–	–	–	2,810	–	–	–	–	–	6,189
Wentworth North	Con	UFO	4,634	72.21%	2,851	44.43%	Con	70.92%	4,634	–	–	–	–	–	1,783	–	–	–	–	–	6,417
Wentworth South	Con	UFO	2,642	34.62%	311	4.07%	Con	70.10%	2,642	–	–	–	–	1,995	2,331	–	–	–	664	–	7,632
Windsor	Lib	Lib	10,874	63.59%	4,649	27.19%	Con	70.02%	–	–	–	–	–	10,874	6,225	–	–	–	–	–	17,099
York East	Con	Con	8,962	36.85%	1,672	6.87%	UFO	67.30%	7,290	–	–	–	–	6,926	8,962	–	1,144	–	–	–	24,322
York North	Con	Con	4,139	38.11%	286	2.63%	Lib	79.36%	2,869	–	–	–	–	3,853	4,139	–	–	–	–	–	10,861
York West	Con	Con	10,436	37.57%	2,113	7.61%	F-Lab	66.52%	–	–	8,323	–	–	–	10,436	4,087	–	4,935	–	–	27,781

(* - on recount; ‡ - recount requested but subsequently abandoned)

= incumbent re-elected under the same party banner
= returned by acclamation
= incumbency arose from byelection gain
= incumbent switched allegiance for 1919 nomination
= not incumbent; had been previously elected to the Legislature
= other incumbents renominated

== Post-election pendulum ==
The robustness of the margins of victory for each party can be summarized in electoral pendulums. These are not necessarily a measure of the volatility of the respective riding results. The following tables show the margins over the various 2nd-place contenders, for which one-half of the value represents the swing needed to overturn the result. Actual seat turnovers to the opposition parties in the 1919 election are noted for reference.

= seats that opposition parties gained in the election

Post-election pendulum - 1919 Ontario general election

Coalition (58 seats)
Margins 5% or less
Northumberland East	Con	0.98
Lanark North	Con	1.18
Essex South	Lib	1.51
Huron Centre	Ind	1.97
Renfrew North	Con	2.38
Hastings East	Con	2.44
Renfrew South	Con	3.06
Niagara Falls	Lib	3.48
Simcoe East	Con	3.89
Wentworth South	Con	4.07
Margins 5%–10%
Oxford South	Con	5.52
Grey Centre	Con	5.74
Peterborough West	Lib	6.01
Dufferin	Con	7.00
Simcoe South	Con	7.36
London	Ind	7.88
Bruce North	Lib	8.17
Ontario North	Con	8.24
Riverdale	Lab	8.31
Lambton West	Lab	8.64
Wellington West	Con	9.20
Halton	Con	9.54
Huron South	Con	9.84
Grey South	Con	9.98
Lanark South	Con	9.99
Margins 10%–20%
Kent East	Con	10.56
Grey North	Con	11.84
Carleton	Con	12.48
Wellington East	Con	12.48
Brant	Con	12.59
Elgin West	Con	14.22
St. Catharines	Con	14.58
Durham East	Con	15.78
Simcoe Centre	Con	15.78
Victoria North	Con	15.88
Peterborough East	Con	16.36
Brant South	Lib	17.27
Sault Ste. Marie	Con	18.22
Dundas	Con	18.90
Elgin East	Con	18.94
Haldimand	Con	19.66
Margins > 20%
Manitoulin	Con	20.40
Fort William	Lib	20.80
Middlesex North	Con	22.18
Glengarry	Lib	24.20
Norfolk South	I-Con	25.34
Kenora	Ind	25.79
Norfolk North	Con	26.18
Lambton East	Con	28.01
Perth South	Con	28.40
Middlesex East	Lib	28.53
Hamilton East	S-Lab	28.55
Waterloo South	Lib	29.12
Hamilton West	Con	32.07
Victoria South	Con	37.94
Essex North	Con	42.18
Wentworth North	Con	44.42
Middlesex West	Con	51.18

Liberal (27 seats)
Margins 5% or less
Algoma	Con	0.61
Bruce West	UFO	1.30
Toronto NW - B	Con	1.60
Margins 5%–10%
Lincoln	UFO	6.16
Parry Sound	Con	8.98
Russell	UFO	9.59
Margins 10%–20%
Northumberland West	Con	10.64
Perth North	UFO	11.21
Prince Edward	Con	11.56
Bruce South	UFO	12.24
Durham West	Con	12.40
Nipissing	Lab	12.70
Brockville	Con	12.94
Stormont	UFO	13.43
Prescott	UFO	15.67
Welland	Con	16.49
Kent West	UFO	17.31
Toronto SE - A	Con	17.55
Toronto SW - B	Con	18.10
Cochrane	Con	18.69
Margins > 20%
Oxford North	Con	20.51
Windsor	Con	27.18
Toronto SW - A	Con	27.72
Ontario South	Con	27.94
Toronto SE - B	Con	33.84
Ottawa East	Lab	38.54
Sturgeon Falls	Con	41.46
Conservative (25 seats)
Acclaimed
Addington
Hastings North
Kingston
Toronto NE - A
Margins 5% or less
Timiskaming	F-Lab	0.89
Peel	Lib	0.93
Grenville	UFO	1.00
Wellington South	Lib	1.01
Sudbury	Lib	1.62
York North	Lib	2.63
Ottawa West	Lab	4.21
Hastings West	Lib	4.38
Muskoka	Lib	4.39
Huron North	Lib	4.43
Margins 5%–10%
Lennox	Lib	5.39
York East	UFO	6.87
York West	F-Lab	7.61
Port Arthur	Lib	7.74
Toronto NW - A	Lib	7.86
Frontenac	UFO	7.99
Leeds	Lib	9.18
Rainy River	Lib	9.92
Margins 10%–20%
Simcoe West	UFO	10.92
Toronto NE - B	I-Con	17.59
Margins > 20%
Parkdale	Ind	37.90
Independent-Liberal (1 seat)
Waterloo North	Lab	13.85

== Impact ==
The result was highly skewed as a result of the way the ridings were drawn up. The Ottawa Journal noted, "The arrangement of electoral districts in Ontario (and throughout Canada) is such that a farmer’s vote has practically twice the effect of the vote of any person resident in cities or large towns. Ottawa, for instance, with 110,000 population elects two members to the Ontario Legislature; Carleton County on one side with 20,000 people elects one member; Russell County on the other side has a population of 40,000 and elects one member."

The UFO emerged from the vote with the largest bloc of seats, joining the eleven Labour MLAs to form a coalition government. Liberal-UFO MLA David James Taylor of Grey North, "Soldier" MLA Joseph McNamara of Riverdale and Labour-UFO MLA Karl Homuth of Waterloo South were also members of the governing caucus giving Drury's coalition 58 seats in total, a slight majority.

The Ontario Liberal Party, led by Hartley Dewart, increased the size of its caucus by a small number, despite turning over more than half the seats held. The Conservative Party lost ground to all other parties, despite receiving the most votes.

The election had several sweeping results:

- only about two dozen MPPs from the previous Legislative Assembly were re-elected;
- notably, Conservative William Hearst was defeated by a Labour candidate;
- Beck and Proudfoot were also defeated by Labour candidates, despite the decision of the Conservatives and Liberals not to contest the seats;
- three clergymen were elected;
- eighteen returned soldiers were elected; and
- all anti-Prohibition candidates were defeated.

Upon hearing the news of the Conservative defeat, Hearst noted:

I will not make any prophecy as to what will take place. I thought the Government was going to sweep the country, and I was not alone in that, for a great many Liberals who were supporting me thought so, too. The Temperance Act no doubt had a great deal to do with my defeat, but I did what I felt was right, and if I had it to do over again, I would do the same thing.

Three days after the election, James J. Morrison, Secretary of the UFO, reported on the way he had addressed the need to form a working majority in the chamber. He released the following statement:

The members-elect of the United Farmers of Ontario, after due consideration of the matter, have decided that it would be unwise for them to enter into alliance with either of the old Parties as parties. They are prepared to assume the fullest share of responsibility and form a Government in co-operation with such members of other parties as are in sympathy with their platform and principles and are free to give support thereto. In the formation of a Cabinet full consideration will be given to the various interests of the Province.

Ernest C. Drury agreed to lead the new government as Premier of Ontario, and a UFO-Labour coalition cabinet was formed. Although he was vice-president of the UFO, Drury had not been a candidate in the election and had to run in a by-election to enter the legislature following his appointment to the office of Premier.

== Results overview ==
Elections to the 15th Parliament of Ontario (1919)
Political party	Party leader	MPPs					Votes		
Political party	Party leader	Candidates	1914	Dissol.	1919	±	#	%	± (pp)
**UFO-Labour Coalition**									
█ United Farmers	–	66	–	2	44	44▲	248,274	20.97%	New
█ Labour	Walter Rollo	21	1	1	11	10▲	107,588	9.09%	7.75▲
█ Farmer–Labour		5	–	–	1	1▲	27,841	2.35%	New
█ Farmer-Liberal		2	–	–	1	1▲	7,448	0.63%	New
█ Soldier		2	–	–	1	1▲	9,618	0.81%	New
**Coalition Total**					**58**		**400,679**	**33.85%**	
Liberal	Hartley Dewart	66	24	27	27	3▲	301,995	25.51%	12.41▼
Conservative	William Hearst	103	84	79	25	59▼	403,655	34.09%	19.78▼
Independent Liberal		1	1	1	1	Steady	5,354	0.45%	0.01▼
Liberal-Temperance		–	1	1	–	1▼	Did not campaign		
Independent		14	–	–	–	–	48,244	4.07%	3.08▲
Independent Conservative		3	–	–	–	–	14,213	1.20%	0.81▲
Soldier–Labour		2	–	–	–	–	9,088	0.77%	New
Socialist		3	–	–	–	–	637	0.05%	0.87▼
**Total**		**288**	**111**	**111**	**111**		**1,183,955**	**100.00%**	
Blank and invalid ballots							50,810		
**Registered voters / turnout**							**1,443,746**	**85.53%**	**21.10**▲

=== Vote and seat summaries ===
Ternary plots - shift of electoral support (1914-1919)
1914

1919
Electoral districts identified by colours of winning parties

Seats and popular vote by party
Party	Seats	Votes	Change (pp)
Coalition	58 / 111	33.85%	32.51
Liberal	27 / 111	25.51%	-12.41
Conservative	25 / 111	34.09%	-19.75
Temperance factions	0 / 111	0.00%	-3.97
Other	1 / 111	6.55%	3.62

=== Results by riding ===
Italicized names indicate members returned by acclamation. Two-tone colour boxes indicate ridings that turned over from the 1914 election, e.g.,

(UFO in 1919 and Conservative in 1914)

**Central Ontario**

Addington: William David Black
Durham East: Samuel Sandford Staples
Durham West: William John Bragg
Hastings East: Henry Ketcheson Denyes
Hastings North: John Robert Cooke
Hastings West: William Henry Ireland
Lennox: Reginald Amherst Fowler
Muskoka: George Walter Ecclestone
Northumberland East: Wesley Montgomery
Northumberland West: Samuel Clarke
Peterborough East: Ernest Nicholls McDonald
Peterborough West: Thomas Tooms
Prince Edward: Nelson Parliament
Simcoe Centre: Gilbert Hugh Murdoch
Simcoe East: John Benjamin Johnston
Simcoe South: Edgar James Evans
Simcoe West: William Torrance Allen
Victoria North: Edgar Watson
Victoria South: Frederick George Sandy

**Eastern Ontario**

Brockville: Donald McAlpine
Carleton: Robert Henry Grant
Dundas: William H. Casselman
Frontenac: Anthony McGuin Rankin
Glengarry: Duncan Alexander Ross
Grenville: George Howard Ferguson
Kingston: Arthur Edward Ross
Lanark North: Hiram McCreary
Lanark South: William J. Johnston
Leeds: Andrew Wellington Gray
Ottawa East: Joseph Albert Pinard
Ottawa West: Hammett Pinhey Hill
Prescott: Gustave Évanturel
Renfrew North: Ralph Melville Warren
Renfrew South: John Carty
Russell: Damase Racine
Stormont: James William McLeod

**Hamilton/Halton/Niagara**

Halton: John Featherstone Ford
Hamilton East: George Grant Halcrow
Hamilton West: Walter Rollo
Lincoln: Thomas A. Marshall
Niagara Falls: Charles Fletcher Swayze
St. Catharines: Frank Howard Greenlaw
Welland: Robert Cooper
Wentworth North: Frank Campbell Biggs
Wentworth South: Wilson A. Crockett

**Midwestern Ontario**

Brant: Harry Corwin Nixon
Brant South: Morrison Mann MacBride
Bruce North: William Henry Fenton
Bruce South: Frank Rennie
Bruce West: Alexander Patterson Mewhinney
Dufferin: Thomas Kerr Slack
Grey Centre: Dougall Carmichael
Grey North: David James Taylor (F-Lib)
Grey South: George Mansfield Leeson
Haldimand: Warren Stringer
Norfolk North: George David Sewell
Norfolk South: Joseph Cridland
Oxford North: John Alexander Calder
Oxford South: Albert Thomas Walker
Perth North: Francis Wellington Hay
Perth South: Peter Smith
Waterloo North: Nicholas Asmussen (I-Lib)
Waterloo South: Karl Kenneth Homuth (F-Lab)
Wellington East: Albert Hellyer
Wellington South: Caleb Henry Buckland
Wellington West: Robert Neil McArthur

**Northeastern Ontario**

Algoma: Kenneth Spencer Stover
Cochrane: Malcolm Lang
Manitoulin: Beniah Bowman
Nipissing: Joseph Marceau
Parry Sound: Richard Reese Hall
Sault Ste. Marie: James Bertram Cunningham
Sturgeon Falls: Zotique Mageau
Sudbury: Charles McCrea
Timiskaming: Thomas Magladery

**Northwest Ontario**

Fort William: Henry Mills
Kenora: Peter Heenan
Port Arthur: Donald McDonald Hogarth
Rainy River: James Arthur Mathieu

**Southwestern Ontario**

Elgin East: Malcolm MacVicar
Elgin West: Peter Gow Cameron
Essex North: Alphonse George Tisdelle
Essex South: Milton C. Fox
Huron Centre: John Govenlock
Huron North: John Joynt
Huron South: Andrew Hicks
Kent East: James B. Clark
Kent West: Robert Livingstone Brackin
Lambton East: Leslie Warner Oke
Lambton West: Jonah Moorehouse Webster
London: Hugh Allen Stevenson
Middlesex East: John Willard Freeborn
Middlesex North: James C. Brown
Middlesex West: John Giles Lethbridge
Windsor: James Craig Tolmie

**Toronto**

Parkdale: William Herbert Price
Riverdale: Joseph McNamara
Toronto Northeast - A: Henry John Cody
Toronto Northeast - B: Joseph Elijah Thompson
Toronto Northwest - A: Thomas Crawford
Toronto Northwest - B: Henry Sloane Cooper
Toronto Southeast - A: John O'Neill
Toronto Southeast - B: James Walter Curry
Toronto Southwest - A: Herbert Hartley Dewart
Toronto Southwest - B: John Carman Ramsden

**York/Peel/Ontario**

Ontario North: John Wesley Widdifield
Ontario South: William Edmund Newton Sinclair
Peel: Thomas Laird Kennedy
York East: George Stewart Henry
York North: Thomas Herbert Lennox
York West: Forbes Godfrey

=== Analysis ===
Party rankings (1st to 5th place)
Party	Acc	1st	2nd	3rd	4th	5th
█ United Farmers		44	11	10	1	
█ Labour		11	6	2	1	
█ Farmer–Labour		1	3	1		
█ Farmer-Liberal		1		1		
█ Soldier		1		1		
█ Liberal		27	21	16	1	
█ Conservative	4	21	59	17		1
█ Independent-Liberal		1	1	3		
█ Independent			4	7	2	
█ Independent-Conservative			1	1	1	
█ Soldier–Labour			1		1	
█ Socialist					2	
**Totals**	4	107	107	59	9	1

Party candidates in 2nd place
Party	UFO	Lab	F-Lab	Lib	Con	Ind	Ind-Lib	Ind-Con	S-Lab
█ United Farmers		1		4	38			1	
█ Labour				4	3	3			1
█ Farmer–Labour				1					
█ Farmer-Liberal					1				
█ Soldier		1							
█ Liberal	7	2	1		17				
█ Conservative	4	1	2	12		1	1		
█ Independent-Liberal		1							
**Totals**	11	6	3	21	59	4	1	1	1

Principal races, according to 1st and 2nd-place results
Parties		Seats
█ United Farmers	█ Conservative	42
█ Liberal	█ Conservative	29
█ Liberal	█ United Farmers	11
█ Labour	█ Liberal	6
█ Labour	█ Conservative	4
█ Labour	█ Independent	3
█ Farmer–Labour	█ Liberal	2
█ Conservative	█ Farmer–Labour	2
█ Conservative	█ Independent	1
█ Conservative	█ Independent-Liberal	1
█ Farmer-Liberal	█ Conservative	1
█ Independent-Liberal	█ Labour	1
█ Labour	█ Soldier–Labour	1
█ Soldier	█ Labour	1
█ United Farmers	█ Independent-Conservative	1
█ United Farmers	█ Labour	1
**Total**		107

=== Seats that changed hands ===
Elections to the 15th Parliament of Ontario – seats won/lost by party, 1914–1919
Party	1914	Gain from (loss to)																		1919
Party	1914	UFO		Lab		F-Lab		F-Lib		Sol		Lib		Con		I-Lib		L-Tmp		1919
█ United Farmers	–											10		34						44
█ Labour	1											3		7						11
█ Farmer–Labour	–													1						1
█ Farmer-Liberal	–													1						1
█ Soldier	–													1						1
Liberal	24		(10)		(3)									16	(1)	1				27
Conservative	84		(34)		(7)		(1)		(1)		(1)	1	(16)				(1)	1		25
Independent-Liberal	1												(1)	1						1
Liberal-Temperance	1														(1)					–
**Total**	111	–	(44)	–	(10)	–	(1)	–	(1)	–	(1)	14	(17)	61	(2)	1	(1)	1	–	111

There were 77 seats that changed allegiance in the election:

(* - open seats, # - byelection gains held, ^ - change of affiliation)

(Riding names in italics did not have Liberal candidates. Riding names in bold did not have Conservative candidates.)

**Conservative to UFO**

- Carleton*
- Dufferin*
- Dundas
- Durham East
- Elgin East*
- Elgin West
- Grey Centre
- Grey South
- Haldimand
- Halton
- Hastings East
- Huron South*
- Lambton East
- Lambton West*
- Lanark North
- Lanark South*
- Manitoulin#
- Middlesex East*
- **Norfolk South**
- Northumberland East*
- Ontario North#
- Oxford South
- Perth South*
- Peterborough East
- Renfrew North
- Renfrew South
- Simcoe Centre*
- Simcoe East
- Simcoe South
- Victoria North
- Victoria South*
- Wellington West
- Wentworth North*
- Wentworth South

**Conservative to Labour**

- Fort William
- Hamilton West*
- Kenora
- **London**
- Niagara Falls
- Sault Ste. Marie
- St. Catharines

**Conservative to Farmer-Labour**

- Waterloo South

**Conservative to Farmer-Liberal**

- Grey North*

**Conservative to Soldier**

- Riverdale*

**Conservative to Liberal**

- Algoma
- Brockville
- Bruce South
- Durham West
- Kent West*
- Nipissing
- Ontario South
- Parry Sound
- Perth North#
- Stormont*
- Toronto Northwest - B
- Toronto Southeast - A*
- Toronto Southeast - B*
- Toronto Southwest - A#
- Toronto Southwest - B*
- Welland

**Conservative to Independent-Liberal**

- Waterloo North

**Liberal to UFO**

- Brant*
- **Bruce North**
- Essex North*
- **Essex South**
- **Glengarry***
- Kent East*
- Middlesex North
- Middlesex West*
- Norfolk North*
- Wellington East

**Liberal to Labour**

- Brant South*
- **Huron Centre**
- Peterborough West

**Liberal to Conservative**

- Ottawa West

**Independent-Liberal to Liberal**

- Prescott^

**Liberal-Temperance to Conservative**

- Wellington South

Resulting composition of the 15th Legislative Assembly of Ontario
Source		Party								
Source		**UFO**	**Lab**	**F-Lab**	**F-Lib**	**Soldier**	**Lib**	**Con**	**Ind-Lib**	Total
Seats retained	Incumbents returned		1				8	14		23
Seats retained	Open seats held						1	4		5
Seats retained	Byelection loss reversed							1		1
Seats retained	Acclamation							4		4
Seats changing hands	Incumbents defeated	23	9	1			10	2	1	46
Seats changing hands	Open seats gained	19	1		1	1	5			27
Seats changing hands	Byelection gain held	2					2			4
Seats changing hands	Change in affiliation						1			1
**Total**		44	11	1	1	1	27	25	1	111

=== Notable groups of candidates ===
Soldier candidates in the 1919 Ontario general election
Party	Riding	Candidate	Military rank	Votes	Placed
Conservative	Kingston	Arthur Edward Ross*	Brigadier-General	Acclaimed	
Conservative	Leeds	Andrew Wellington Gray	Major	4,351	1st
Conservative	Parkdale	William Herbert Price*	Colonel	11,091	1st
Conservative	Peel	Thomas Laird Kennedy	Colonel	4,562	1st
Conservative	Port Arthur	Donald McDonald Hogarth*	Brigadier-General	2,578	1st
Conservative	Timiskaming	Thomas Magladery*	Captain	3,092	1st
Conservative	Toronto Northeast - B	Joseph Thompson	Captain	13,495	1st
Conservative	Wellington South	Caleb Henry Buckland†	Captain	4,362	1st
Liberal	Algoma	Kenneth Spencer Stover	Lieutenant	2,272	1st
Liberal	Cochrane	Malcolm Lang*	Major	2,951	1st
Liberal	Hastings West	Edward O'Flynn	Lieutenant-Colonel	4,647	2nd
Liberal	Middlesex East	Bart Robson	Lieutenant-Colonel	2,500	2nd
Liberal	Sudbury	Robert Arthur	Lieutenant-Colonel	3,409	2nd
Liberal	Toronto Northwest - B	Henry Sloane Cooper	Lieutenant-Colonel	18,522	1st
Liberal	Toronto Southwest - B	John Carman Ramsden	Captain	12,428	1st
Liberal	Windsor	James Craig Tolmie †	Major	10,874	1st
Soldier	Hamilton East	Maurice Fitzgerald	Captain	2,146	3rd
Soldier	Riverdale	Joseph McNamara	Sergeant-Major	7,472	1st
Soldier-Labour	Hamilton East	Samuel Landers	Lieutenant	8,424	2nd
Soldier-Labour	Wentworth South	Samuel Wilkinson		664	3rd
United Farmers	Grey Centre	Dougall Carmichael	Lieutenant-Colonel	4,363	1st
United Farmers	York East	George Little	Captain	7,290	2nd
Independent	Kenora	Harold Arthur Clement Machin *‡	Lieutenant-Colonel	895	2nd
Independent Conservative	Norfolk South	Arthur Clarence Pratt *‡	Colonel	1,954	2nd
Independent Conservative	Toronto Northeast - B	Kelly Evans ‡	Lieutenant-Colonel	8,172	2nd

(* - incumbent; † - chaplain; ‡ - Anti-Prohibition)

Women candidates in the 1919 Ontario general election
Riding	Candidate		Votes	Placed
Ottawa West	█ Independent	Justenia Sears	2,723	4th
Toronto Northeast - B	█ Liberal	Henrietta Bundy	5,685	3rd

Candidates returned by acclamation
Party	Riding	Candidate
Conservative	Addington	William David Black
Conservative	Hastings North	John Robert Cooke
Conservative	Kingston	Arthur Edward Ross
Conservative	Toronto Northeast - A	Henry John Cody

Cooke was the only acclaimed candidate who had not previously been an incumbent.

== See also ==
- Politics of Ontario
- List of Ontario political parties
- Premier of Ontario
- Leader of the Opposition (Ontario)
