= Udney Richardson =

Canadian politician

Ontario MPP
- In office 1911–1919
- Preceded by: James J. Craig
- Succeeded by: Albert Hellyer
- Constituency: Wellington East

Personal details
- Born: 1869 West Garafraxa, Canada West
- Died: December 28, 1943 (aged 73–74) Elora, Ontario
- Party: Liberal

Udney Richardson (1869 - 1943) was a Canadian politician, who represented the electoral district of Wellington East from 1911 to 1919 in the Legislative Assembly of Ontario. He was a member of the Ontario Liberal Party.

Prior to his election to the legislature, Richardson served as reeve of Elora, Ontario. He was later reelected to that office, and was an owner of the local mill.
