= Albert Hellyer =

Canadian politician

Ontario MPP
- In office 1919–1920
- Preceded by: Udney Richardson
- Succeeded by: William Raney
- Constituency: Wellington East

Personal details
- Born: July 14, 1860 Arthur Township, Wellington County, Canada West
- Died: September 7, 1945 (aged 81) Arthur Township, Wellington County, Ontario
- Party: United Farmers
- Occupation: Farmer

Albert Hellyer (July 14, 1860 – September 7, 1945) was a Canadian politician, who represented the electoral district of Wellington East from 1919 to 1920 in the Legislative Assembly of Ontario. He was a member of the United Farmers of Ontario.

Hellyer, a farmer from Kenilworth, was elected to the legislature in the 1919 election. However, after just a few weeks in office he resigned his seat to allow cabinet minister William Raney to enter the legislature in a by-election. In exchange, he was appointed to a special provincial commission on land title and civil service reform.
