= Robert Cooper (Canadian politician) =

Canadian politician

Robert Cooper (born September 13, 1858 died on May 15, 1943) was an Ontario farmer and political figure. He represented Welland in the Legislative Assembly of Ontario as a Liberal member from 1919 to 1923.

He was born in Marshville, Wainfleet Township, Canada West, the son of David Cooper. Cooper was a cattle breeder. In 1879, he married Bertha Jane Crow. He was a director of the Maple Leaf Milling Company (later part of Maple Leaf Foods). Cooper served as a member of board for the Welland City Hospital, as chairman of the Board of Water Commissioners and as president of the local Children's Aid Society. He was also clerk for Welland County.
