= Henry John Cody =

Canadian clergyman and politician (1868–1951)

The Reverend Henry John Cody CMG
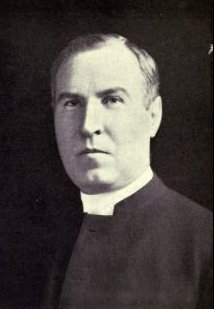

19th Chancellor of the University of Toronto
- In office 1944–1947
- President: Sidney Earle Smith
- Preceded by: William Mulock
- Succeeded by: Vincent Massey

6th President of the University of Toronto
- In office 1932–1944
- Chancellor: William Mulock
- Preceded by: Robert Falconer
- Succeeded by: Sidney Earle Smith

Member of the Legislative Assembly of Ontario
- In office 1918–1920
- Preceded by: Robert Allan Pyne
- Succeeded by: Alexander Cameron Lewis
- Constituency: Toronto Northeast - Seat A

Personal details
- Born: December 6, 1868 Embro, Ontario
- Died: April 27, 1951 (aged 82)
- Education: University of Toronto

Henry John Cody CMG (December 6, 1868 – April 27, 1951) was a Canadian clergyman and politician. He served as Ontario's education minister from 1918 to 1919, and as the sixth president of the University of Toronto from 1932 to 1945. He was also appointed the 19th chancellor of the university from 1944 to 1947.

== Early life ==
Born in Embro, Ontario, the eldest son of Elijah Cody and Margaret Louisa Torrance, he attended Galt Collegiate Institute and the University of Toronto. While attending university, Cody formed a life-long friendship with roommate Howard Ferguson.

== Episcopal career ==
He was ordained a Church of England priest in 1894 and for 40 years associated with St. Paul's, Bloor Street, a parish with a congregation with an evangelical leaning. He was the driving force behind the expansion of the small church to the current statue.

In 1904 he was elected Bishop of Nova Scotia but declined the post, and the post went instead to Clarendon Worrell, whose brother John Austin Worrell was the chancellor of the Diocese of Toronto and later a leading opponent of Cody's candidacy for the Toronto bishopric.

Cody was appointed a canon of St Alban's Cathedral in 1903 and archdeacon of York in 1909.

=== 1909 Toronto Episcopal election ===
The election following the death of Arthur Sweatman, Bishop of Toronto and Primate of the Anglican Church of Canada, was a hotly contested affairs with Cody, then rector of St. Paul's, and Bishop George Thorneloe of Algoma as the primary contenders. The election was seen by some to have "crystallized the traditional rivalry between Wycliffe and Trinity" colleges, a manifestation of the then prominent divergence between the traditional "high church" and the evangelicals within the Anglican community. The election attracted a great deal more interest and partisan political flare in the press than Anglican elections ordinarily do, with the Globe, the Star, and the World all providing extensive coverage that was favourable to Cody's candidacy. Conservative MPPs William David McPherson of Toronto West (and later a cabinet colleague) and William Hoyle of Ontario North, Conservative MP William Edward O'Brien, Liberal senator James Kirkpatrick Kerr, judge Samuel Hume Blake (brother of the former Liberal leader), Toronto police chief H. J. Grasett along with a long list of prominent figures were reported as lay delegates in support of Cody in Star's front-page coverage of the first day of the synod, while prominent supporters of Thorneloe such as former Toronto mayor Arthur Radcliffe Boswell was mentioned in passing without his office being noted.

The electoral synod, held at St. James's Cathedral and started on Wednesday February 17, 1909, took three days, seven ballots and a resolution conference. With 177 clerical votes (each held by an individual clergyman) and 128 lay votes (one for each parish, to be determined by plurality of its three delegates, with the vote recorded as lost if the three votes went to three different candidates) available, a candidate must receive majority support from both electoral pools to be elected. The competitiveness of the contest was evident from the first ballot, in which Cody received 60 clerical and 67 lay votes compared to Thorneloe's 109 clerical and 51 lay votes. The follow five ballots resulted in similar distribution, with majority of the lay delegates supporting Cody while majority of the clergy holding firm for Thorneloe.

Following the fifth ballot, a telegram from Thorneloe was read out, which indicated he had "neither authorized nor approved what is being done". Despite Thorneloe's protest, his tally only dropped to 98 clerical and 51 lay votes, while Cody made no gains. The synod adjourned after the sixth ballot on the second day, and on the third day agreed to appoint a committee with eight representatives of each of the two leading candidates to discuss a compromise solution. A seventh ballot was taken after the committee's deliberation, electing archdeacon James Sweeny, who received just a handful of votes in earlier ballots, with 153 clerical and 111 lay votes. Cody immediately pledged his loyalty in support of the new bishop, though he also noted the need for the church to Canadianize, a key point pressed by his supporters. (Both Thorneloe and Sweeny were born in England.)

== Minister of Education ==
As evident by his 1909 campaign to become Toronto's Anglican bishop, Cody had an extensive network among prominent conservatives. His university long time friend Howard Ferguson was elected a Conservative MPP in 1905 and was promoted to cabinet by new Premier William Hearst in 1914 as Minister of Lands, Forest, and Mine. He became significantly more engaged in political affairs during the First World War, preaching to his congregation in support of the war effort and giving speeches at other venues and society events. He was particularly effective in giving speeches for recruitment, and became associate of Sam Hughes, the Minister of Militia and Defence in the ministry of Conservative Prime Minister Robert Borden. Cody took an active part in the conscription election of 1917, vocally supporting Borden's Unionist government.

In a surprise announcement in May 1918, Premier (then titled "Prime Minister") Sir William Hearst named Cody, at the time not in elected office, the province's new education minister to succeed Robert Pyne, who has been in the role since the Conservatives formed government in 1905. While Cody's selection was generally cordially received in the press, his decision to remain St. Paul's rector while serving as a minister of the crown received much criticism. Even conservative supporters cited the Egerton Ryerson's precedents of withdrawal from Methodist Church activities while heading the education department and urge Cody to relinquish his church role.

Cody was nominated as the Conservative candidate for Toronto Northeast Seat A, the seat left vacant by Ryne, on June 10, 1918, with much fanfare. Premier Hearst attended personally and spoke for over an hour. In attendance were a third of his cabinet and Toronto Mayor Thomas Langton Church. The opposition Liberal caucus had taken a formal position to cooperate with the government to avoid war-time elections, and party leader William Proudfoot personally intervened at a meeting of the local Liberal association to convinced it to not field a candidate. Instead, Cody's electoral opposition came from a candidate running under the Soldier-Labour banner. Campaign however name naturally for Cody, and won the summer by-election with about two-third of the vote. The by-election was of historical significance in that it was the first Ontario election with women on the voters list.

Within a week of his by-election victory, Cody left Toronto for a foreign trip to London on the invitation of the Canadian Lord Beaverbrook, who was serving as Britain's Minister of Information. Crossing the Atlantic during wartime was a dangerous affairs requiring complex manoeuvres, his sail from New York to England alone took up 13 days.

During his short tenure as minister, complete the passage of a number of policy setting legislations (some were started by his predecessor), most notably for compulsory school attendance for all youth between eight and sixteen, empowering the establishment of a college of education.

With the cooperation agreement with the Liberals having expired, Premier Hearst called an election for October 20, 1919. Cody was one of four Conservative incumbent that were returned by acclamation in that election, which left him free to campaign for other Conservative candidates. It was however a catastrophic election for the Conservatives. The party was divided over prohibition, with the Premier and Cody's friend Ferguson holding diverging positions. For the first time in Ontario history the incumbent government failed to form government or opposition, and the Premier losing his own seat.

Having lost 59 of their 84 seats, the Conservative were rendered to third place. Despite his close friend Howard Ferguson having assumed interim party leadership (and would later in that year handily win the permanent leadership), Cody resigned his seat on March 3, 1920, to return to the church full time.

== University of Toronto ==
Cody maintained a great interest in the University of Toronto throughout his life. He was a member of the Royal Commission on the University of Toronto which reported in 1906, and later was the Chairman of the Royal Commission on University Finances that reported in 1921. Ferguson advocated his candidacy for the university's presidency as early as 1906 in succession of James Loudon. Cody was shortlisted but the post went to Robert Falconer, an incumbent education administrator, that year.

In 1917 he was appointed a member of the University of Toronto's board of governors, and from 1923 to 1932 served as chairman.

He would later become President of the university in 1932, and then its Chancellor in 1944.

== Honours ==
He was made a Companion of the Order of St Michael and St George in 1943.

Cody's son, Maurice, has a K–6 school named after him in Toronto. At the University of Toronto Schools, the Cody house in the intramural house system is named in his honour.

Legislative Assembly of Ontario
Preceded by Robert Pyne	MLA for Toronto Northeast - Seat A 1918–1920	Succeeded by Alexander Cameron Lewis
Political offices
Preceded by Robert Pyne	Minister of Education of Ontario; 1918–1919	Succeeded by Robert Grant
Academic offices
Preceded by Robert Falconer	President of the University of Toronto; 1932–1944	Succeeded by Sidney Earle Smith
Preceded by William Mulock	Chancellor of the University of Toronto; 1944–1947	Succeeded by Vincent Massey
