= Joseph Thompson (Canadian politician) =

Canadian politician

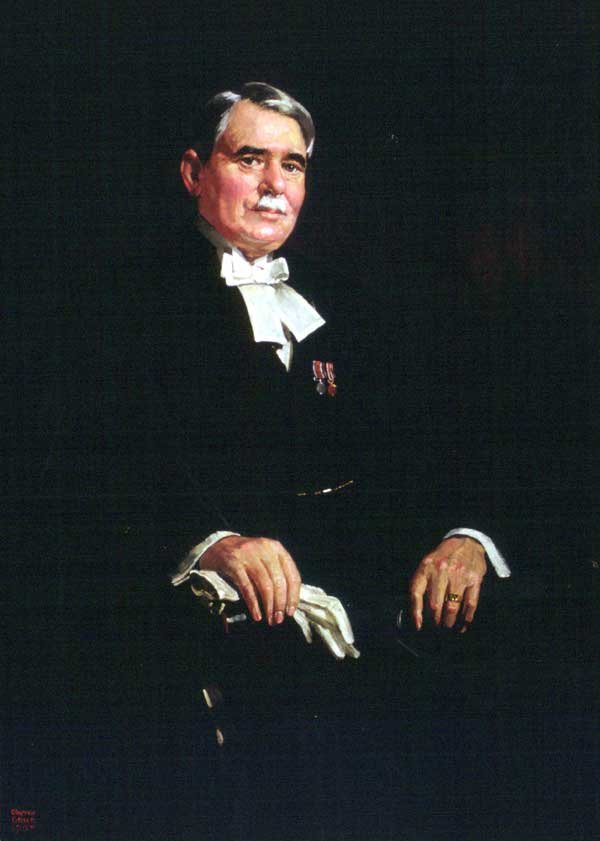
- portrait by Edmund Wyly Grier

Ontario MPP
- In office 1926–1929
- Preceded by: Riding established
- Succeeded by: Wilfrid Heighington
- Constituency: St. David
- In office 1919–1926
- Preceded by: Mark Howard Irish
- Succeeded by: Riding abolished
- Constituency: Toronto Northeast - Seat B

Personal details
- Born: July 19, 1867 Toronto, Ontario
- Died: March 16, 1941 (aged 73)
- Party: Conservative
- Spouse: Ida M. Wilkinson
- Occupation: Insurance broker

Joseph Elijah Thompson (July 19, 1867 – March 16, 1941) was speaker of the Legislature of Ontario from 1924 to 1926 and served as Conservative MLA for St. David and Toronto Northeast from 1919 to 1929.

This was the period of the Ontario Liberal Conservative Party's rule under Howard Ferguson.

Thompson was born in Toronto, the son of Joseph Thompson, and grew up in Toronto's Cabbagetown neighbourhood. He was educated at Dufferin School and Jarvis Collegiate. At 17, he was employed as a clerk in a dry goods store. In 1889, he became a treasury clerk for the city of Toronto. In 1898, he married Ida M. Wilkinson. In 1907, he became Toronto's Commissioner of Industry and Publicity. In 1908, Thompson entered business on his own as an insurance broker. He served as city controller in 1915. He was a captain in the Canadian Expeditionary Force during World War I.

After he left politics in 1929, he was named registrar for the Toronto surrogate court. Thompson lost this appointment in 1934 and returned to the insurance business. In 1939, he ran unsuccessfully for a seat on Toronto city council. He died in Toronto two years later.
