= Robert Allan Pyne =

Canadian physician and politician

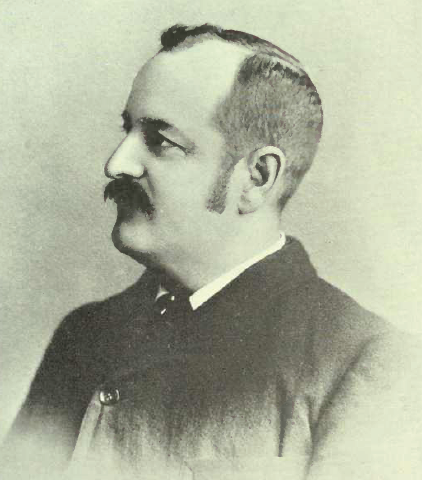

Ontario MPP
- In office 1914–1918
- Preceded by: New riding
- Succeeded by: Henry John Cody
- Constituency: Toronto Northeast - Seat A
- In office 1898–1914
- Preceded by: George Ryerson
- Succeeded by: Riding abolished
- Constituency: Toronto East

Personal details
- Born: October 29, 1853 Newmarket, Canada West
- Died: June 18, 1931 (aged 77) Toronto, Ontario
- Party: Conservative
- Spouse: Mary Isobel Macqueen
- Education: University of Toronto; Queen's University
- Occupation: Physician
- Cabinet: Minister of Education (1905-1918)

Robert Allan Pyne (October 29, 1853 – June 18, 1931) was an Ontario physician and political figure. He represented Toronto East and then Toronto Northeast in the Legislative Assembly of Ontario as a Conservative member from 1898 to 1918.

== Background ==
He was born in Newmarket, Canada West, the son of Doctor Thomas Pyne. He studied at the University of Toronto and Queen's University. Pyne served as secretary and treasurer for the Ontario College of Physicians and Surgeons. He married Mary Isobel Macqueen. He practiced medicine in Toronto and also served on the Toronto school board and Board of Health. He served as assistant surgeon in the local militia.

== Politics ==
Pyne was Minister of Education from 1905 to 1918. He resigned his seat in 1918 and was named clerk for York County. Pyne was also a governor of the University of Toronto. During the war he was put in charge of establishing the Ontario Military Hospital at Orpington, Kent, England, at which time he was made a lieutenant-colonel in the Canadian Army. During his lengthy absence G. Howard Ferguson served as Acting Minister of Education.
