= 1923 Ontario general election =

Canadian provincial election

- June 25, 1923

111 seats in the 16th Legislative Assembly of Ontario 56 seats were needed for a majority
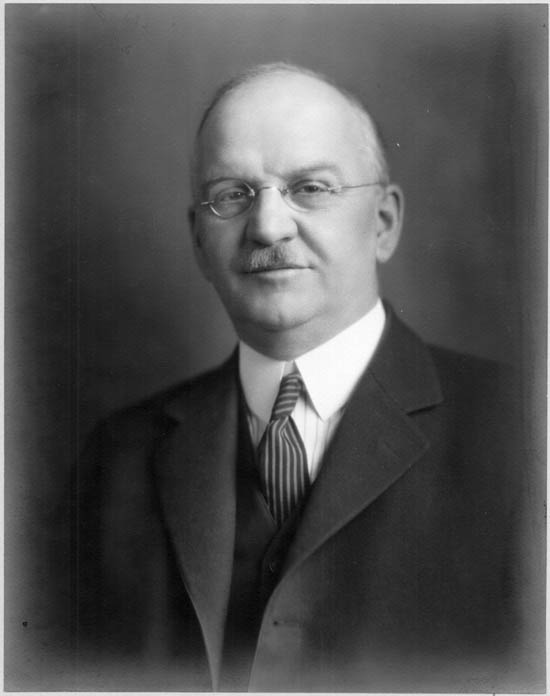

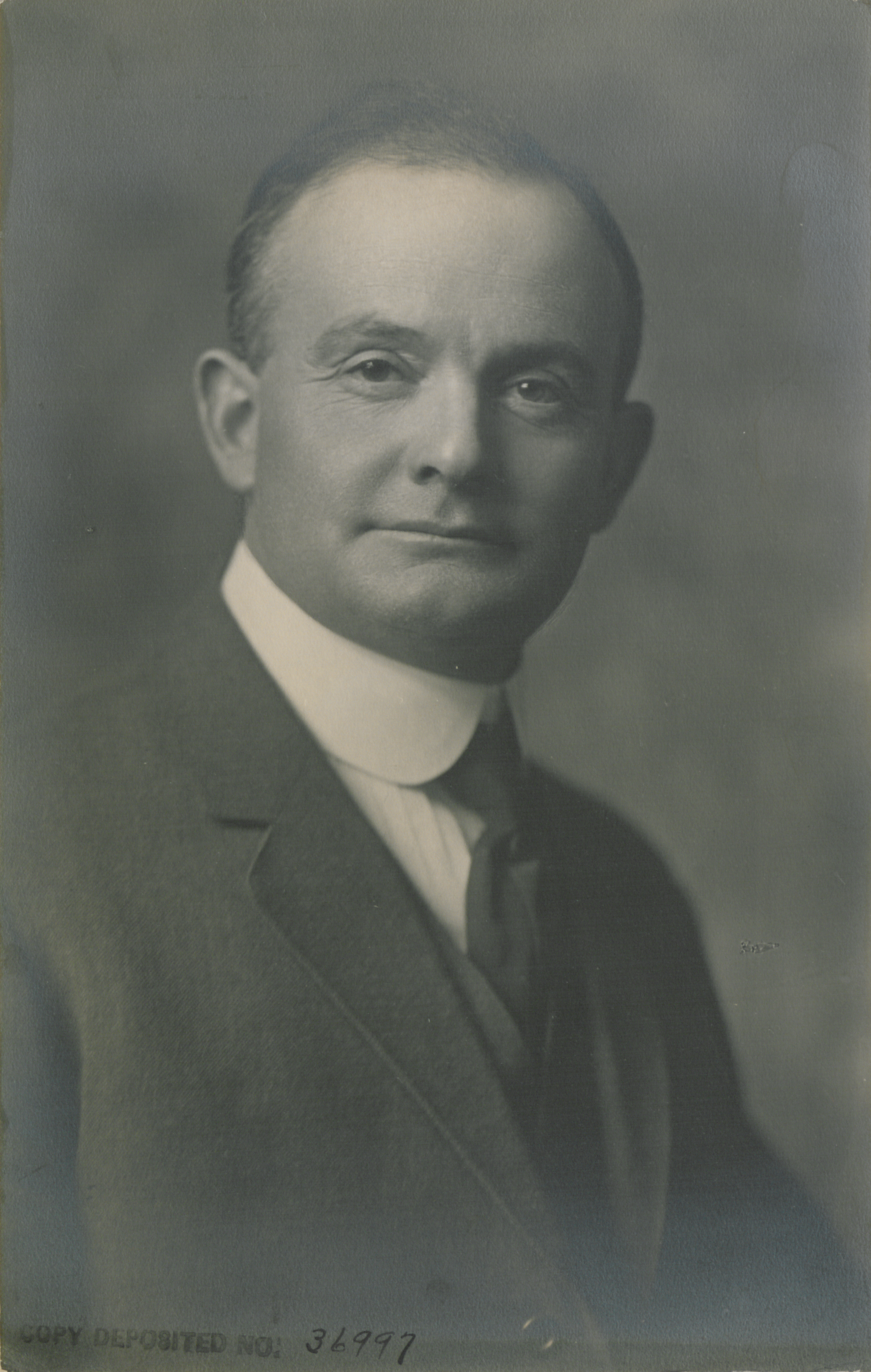

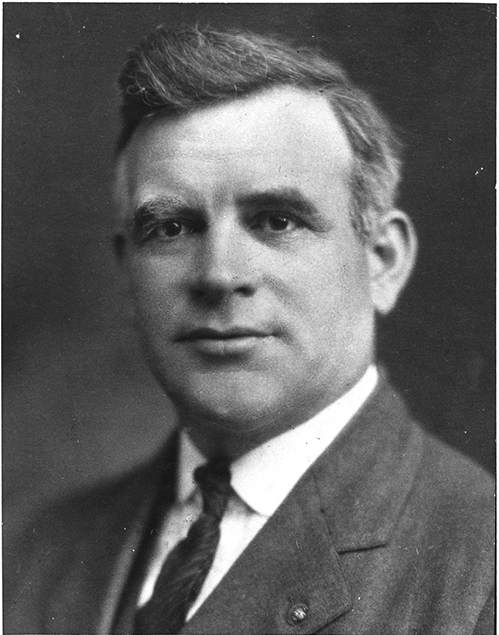
	First party	Second party	Third party
			LIB
Leader	Howard Ferguson	Ernest C. Drury	Wellington Hay
Party	Conservative	United Farmers	Liberal
Leader since	December 2, 1920	1920	1921
Leader's seat	Grenville	Halton (lost re-election)	Perth North (lost re-election)
Last election	25	44	27
Seats won	75	17	14
Seat change	▲50	▼27	▼13
Percentage	49.8%	21.1%	21.8%
Swing	▲14.9pp	▲0.1pp	▼5.1pp
	Fourth party
Leader	Walter Rollo
Party	Labour
Leader since	1919
Leader's seat	Hamilton West (lost re-election)
Last election	11
Seats won	4
Seat change	▼7
Percentage	4.8%
Swing	▼4.3pp
Premier before election
Ernest Charles Drury
United Farmers
Premier after election
Howard Ferguson
Conservative

The 1923 Ontario general election was the 16th general election held in the province of Ontario, Canada. It was held on June 25, 1923, to elect the 111 Members of the 16th Legislative Assembly of Ontario ("MLAs").

The Ontario Conservative Party, led by George Howard Ferguson, was elected to power with a majority in the Legislature (although taking less than half the votes cast).

This election ended the rule of the United Farmers of Ontario-Labour coalition government of Ernest C. Drury.

== Campaign ==
Candidate contests in the ridings
Candidates nominated	Ridings	Party							
Candidates nominated	Ridings	Con	UFO	Lib	Lab	Ind	Pro	Ind-Lib	Totals
Acclamation	2	1			1				2
2	50	43	34	19	2	1	1		100
3	49	48	34	48	13	1	2	1	147
4	8	8	2	9	6	6		1	32
5	1	1	1	1		2			5
6	1	2		1	1	2			6
Total	111	103	71	78	23	12	3	2	292

== Electoral system ==
Most seats filled using first past the post voting in single-member districts.

The eight Toronto MPPs were elected in four two-seat districts where the seats were filled in separate first past the post contests.

== Voter turnout ==
The election saw a voter turnout of just 54.7%, the lowest voter turnout in Ontario history until the 2007 election.

The low election turn-out was in part caused by the worst wind, rain and lightning storm in years inundating the western part of the province. The electrical storm and hurricane began shortly after the polls closed, resulting in massive disruption of telegraph and telephone communications, which hampered the reporting of results.

== Results ==
The 1923 election was plagued by low turn-out, and all the parties took fewer voters than they had in 1919.

The UFO actually took a larger proportion of the vote than it had in 1919 but took just a fraction of the seats it had taken in 1919 due to much of the anti-UFO vote concentrating behind Conservative Party candidates. The UFO had held power by virtue of a coalition with Labour and three other MLAs. Together they had received 34 per cent of the votes cast in 1919. The Conservatives after the 1923 election took majority government based on taking 34 per cent of the vote by that one party alone.

The Ontario Liberal Party, led by Wellington Hay, lost close to half its caucus in the Conservative landslide. Labour (the Independent Labour Party) too lost most of its MLAs in this turn-around election.

The Conservative party was the most popular, taking 34 per cent of the vote. Its candidate was the leading one in a large proportion of the districts, giving it a large majority of seats in the legislature (more than its due proportionally) under the First past the post system in use at the time.

In the election, the UFO again did not run candidates where a Labour candidate was running - and also not in 20 other districts as well. The UFO received the third-most number of votes overall but only ran in about two-thirds of the districts so its vote count likely does not measure its actual support. Together Labour and the UFO ran in 93 seats so the two did not cover all the districts in the province.

The UFO did not receive as many votes as it had in 1919 but still got fairly good numbers considering it did not run candidates in a third of the districts. As the 1923 election was plagued by low turn-out, the UFO received a higher percentage of votes cast than it had received in 1919.

Prior to the election, the UFO government had introduced bills to re-distribute the ridings, and to introduce proportional representation and the single transferable vote, but withdrew them after vehement opposition from the Conservative MLAs, and it was found that even some government members were ambivalent.

Under First past the post, the UFO received about a third of the seats that it was due proportionally overall. Looking at the 71 districts where the UFO ran candidates, it received about half the votes there so was due 35 of those seats but received only eight. In many districts, Conservative candidates took rural seats away from incumbent UFO MLAs by taking just a few hundred more votes than them in each district. In Prince Edward, Conservative candidate Horace Stanley Colliver took just 17 more votes than his closest contender to win the seat.

Ferguson was the only party leader to hold his seat in the election. Drury, Hay and Rollo all lost their seats to their Conservative opponents.

Elections to the 16th Parliament of Ontario (1923)
Political party	Party leader	MPPs					Votes		
Political party	Party leader	Candidates	1919	Dissol.	1923	±	#	%	± (pp)
Conservative	Howard Ferguson	103	25	24	75	50▲	473,819	49.77%	15.68▲
United Farmers	E.C. Drury	71	44	44	17	27▼	199,393	20.94%	0.03▼
Liberal	Wellington Hay	78	27	27	14	13▼	203,079	21.33%	4.18▼
Labour	Walter Rollo	23	11	11	4	7▼	45,213	4.75%	4.34▼
Independent		12	–	–	1	1▲	15,426	1.62%	2.45▼
Independent Liberal		2	1	1	–	1▼	5,041	0.53%	0.08▲
Progressive		3	–	–	–	–	10,122	1.06%	New
Farmer–Labour		–	1	1	–	1▼	Did not campaign		
Farmer-Liberal		–	1	1	–	1▼	Did not campaign		
Soldier		–	1	1	–	1▼	Did not campaign		
Vacant				1					
Total		292	111	111	111		952,093	100.00%	
Blank and invalid ballots							13,600		
Registered voters / turnout							1,655,312	58.34%	27.19▼

=== Vote and seat summaries ===
Ternary plots - shift of electoral support (1919-1923)
1919

1923
Electoral districts identified by colours of winning parties

=== Synopsis of results ===
Results by riding - 1923 Ontario general election (Note: Data compiled from "Return from the Records of the General Election to the Legislative Assembly in 1923 held on 14th and 25th June". Legislative Assembly of Ontario. 1923.. Party affiliations per Hopkins 1924, pp. 577–579. Tables compiled by Elections Ontario have incomplete riding list and multiple transcription errors.)
Riding	Region	Winning party						Turnout (Note: including spoilt ballots)	Votes							
Riding	Region	1919 → 1923		Votes	Share	Margin #	Margin %	Turnout	Con	UFO	Lib	Lab	Ind	I-Lib	Prog	Total
Addington	EAS		Con	3,110	70.83%	1,829	41.65%	61.33%	3,110	–	1,281	–	–	–	–	4,391
Algoma	NOR		Lib	2,365	36.06%	14	0.21%	67.57%	2,351	1,842	2,365	–	–	–	–	6,558
Brant North	MWO		UFO	3,617	50.36%	52	0.72%	61.19%	3,565	3,617	–	–	–	–	–	7,182
Brant South	MWO		Lab	5,678	53.26%	695	6.52%	59.09%	–	–	4,983	5,678	–	–	–	10,661
Brockville	EAS	→	Con	4,182	59.12%	1,290	18.24%	62.26%	4,182	–	2,892	–	–	–	–	7,074
Bruce North	MWO		UFO	2,557	39.97%	311	4.86%	75.68%	2,246	2,557	1,595	–	–	–	–	6,398
Bruce South	MWO	→	UFO	1,942	35.83%	49	0.90%	67.10%	1,893	1,942	1,585	–	–	–	–	5,420
Bruce West	MWO		Lib	2,582	38.73%	38	0.57%	68.07%	1,541	2,544	2,582	–	–	–	–	6,667
Carleton	EAS	→	Con	4,813	61.22%	1,764	22.44%	64.13%	4,813	3,049	–	–	–	–	–	7,862
Cochrane	NOR		Lib	3,138	39.54%	627	7.90%	42.39%	2,172	–	3,138	2,511	116	–	–	7,937
Dufferin	MWO	→	Con	3,898	51.47%	223	2.94%	72.03%	3,898	3,675	–	–	–	–	–	7,573
Dundas	EAS	→	Con	3,773	54.07%	568	8.14%	65.52%	3,773	3,205	–	–	–	–	–	6,978
Durham East	CEN	→	Con	3,040	60.25%	1,034	20.49%	63.35%	3,040	2,006	–	–	–	–	–	5,046
Durham West	CEN		Lib	2,295	42.31%	181	3.34%	67.51%	2,114	1,015	2,295	–	–	–	–	5,424
Elgin East	SWO	→	Con	2,968	44.34%	1,050	15.69%	61.37%	2,968	1,807	1,918	–	–	–	–	6,693
Elgin West	SWO	→	Con	5,289	50.07%	1,709	14.68%	58.24%	5,289	2,773	3,580	–	–	–	–	11,642
Essex North	SWO	→	Lib	4,282	62.15%	1,674	24.30%	49.08%	–	2,608	4,282	–	–	–	–	6,890
Essex South	SWO	→	Con	2,652	35.43%	60	0.80%	57.08%	2,652	2,592	2,241	–	–	–	–	7,485
Fort William	NOR	→	Con	2,866	39.94%	208	2.90%	57.97%	2,866	–	1,152	2,658	–	500	–	7,176
Frontenac	EAS		Con	3,529	57.56%	927	15.12%	70.59%	3,529	2,602	–	–	–	–	–	6,131
Glengarry	EAS	→	Lib	3,313	54.53%	550	9.05%	54.27%	–	2,763	3,313	–	–	–	–	6,076
Grenville	EAS		Con	4,374	66.56%	2,176	33.11%	60.17%	4,374	2,198	–	–	–	–	–	6,572
Grey Centre	MWO		UFO	3,636	50.52%	75	1.04%	65.32%	3,561	3,636	–	–	–	–	–	7,197
Grey North (Note: Incumbent was elected as Farmer-Liberal in 1919)	MWO	→	UFO	3,873	40.50%	60	0.63%	68.46%	3,813	3,873	1,877	–	–	–	–	9,563
Grey South	MWO	→	Con	4,553	51.77%	312	3.55%	65.93%	4,553	4,241	–	–	–	–	–	8,794
Haldimand	MWO	→	Con	4,297	47.56%	644	7.13%	65.96%	4,297	3,653	1,085	–	–	–	–	9,035
Halton	HAM	→	Con	5,186	45.43%	716	6.27%	68.60%	5,186	4,470	1,760	–	–	–	–	11,416
Hamilton East	HAM	→	Con	11,064	55.07%	5,932	29.53%	41.12%	11,064	–	5,132	3,894	–	–	–	20,090
Hamilton West	HAM	→	Con	5,784	52.42%	2,731	24.75%	46.80%	5,784	–	3,053	2,198	–	–	–	11,035
Hastings East	EAS	→	Con	3,741	62.40%	1,487	24.80%	64.10%	3,741	2,254	–	–	–	–	–	5,995
Hastings North	EAS		Con	4,356	71.77%	2,643	43.55%	58.15%	4,356	1,713	–	–	–	–	–	6,069
Hastings West	EAS		Con	4,846	60.05%	1,622	20.10%	51.08%	4,846	–	3,224	–	–	–	–	8,070
Huron Centre	MWO	→	Con	3,133	41.58%	724	9.61%	66.47%	3,133	1,992	–	2,409	–	–	–	7,534
Huron North	MWO		Con	2,896	44.44%	398	6.11%	68.11%	2,896	2,498	1,122	–	–	–	–	6,516
Huron South	MWO	→	Con	2,800	40.11%	437	6.26%	69.29%	2,800	2,363	1,818	–	–	–	–	6,981
Kenora (Note: Incumbent returned)	NOR		Lab	acclaimed												
Kent East	SWO		UFO	4,024	54.75%	698	9.50%	57.65%	3,326	4,024	–	–	–	–	–	7,350
Kent West	SWO		Lib	6,153	59.80%	2,017	19.60%	47.73%	–	4,136	6,153	–	–	–	–	10,289
Kingston	EAS		Con	acclaimed												
Lambton East	SWO		UFO	3,224	44.28%	458	6.29%	66.68%	2,766	3,224	1,291	–	–	–	–	7,281
Lambton West	SWO	→	Con	6,022	45.96%	2,119	16.17%	60.18%	6,022	3,903	3,179	–	–	–	–	13,104
Lanark North	EAS	→	Con	3,339	54.32%	531	8.64%	65.14%	3,339	2,808	–	–	–	–	–	6,147
Lanark South	EAS	→	Con	3,874	57.27%	983	14.53%	59.71%	3,874	2,891	–	–	–	–	–	6,765
Leeds	EAS		Con	3,779	57.34%	968	14.69%	60.65%	3,779	2,811	–	–	–	–	–	6,590
Lennox	EAS	→	Lib	2,767	51.22%	132	2.44%	69.44%	2,635	–	2,767	–	–	–	–	5,402
Lincoln	HAM	→	UFO	2,360	35.05%	43	0.64%	58.34%	2,057	2,360	2,317	–	–	–	–	6,734
London	SWO	→	Con	9,865	64.85%	7,611	50.03%	46.16%	9,865	–	1,851	2,254	1,243	–	–	15,213
Manitoulin	NOR		UFO	2,407	57.64%	638	15.28%	66.69%	1,769	2,407	–	–	–	–	–	4,176
Middlesex East	SWO		UFO	3,568	47.76%	377	5.05%	34.24%	3,191	3,568	711	–	–	–	–	7,470
Middlesex North	SWO	→	Con	3,319	52.52%	318	5.03%	67.10%	3,319	3,001	–	–	–	–	–	6,320
Middlesex West	SWO		UFO	2,642	52.03%	206	4.06%	66.37%	–	2,642	2,436	–	–	–	–	5,078
Muskoka	CEN		Con	4,186	64.45%	1,877	28.90%	—N/a	4,186	–	2,309	–	–	–	–	6,495
Niagara Falls	HAM	→	Con	4,922	51.97%	2,518	26.59%	47.04%	4,922	–	2,145	2,404	–	–	–	9,471
Nipissing	NOR	→	Con	3,238	48.83%	268	4.04%	52.46%	3,238	–	2,970	423	–	–	–	6,631
Norfolk North	MWO		UFO	3,068	51.87%	221	3.74%	61.16%	2,847	3,068	–	–	–	–	–	5,915
Norfolk South	MWO	→	Con	3,070	55.84%	642	11.68%	73.34%	3,070	2,428	–	–	–	–	–	5,498
Northumberland East	CEN	→	Con	4,434	52.09%	356	4.18%	71.02%	4,434	4,078	–	–	–	–	–	8,512
Northumberland West	CEN		Lib	2,810	51.44%	157	2.87%	69.94%	2,653	–	2,810	–	–	–	–	5,463
Ontario North	CEN		UFO	3,330	50.61%	80	1.22%	68.75%	3,250	3,330	–	–	–	–	–	6,580
Ontario South	CEN		Lib	4,212	39.72%	197	1.86%	58.35%	4,015	2,376	4,212	–	–	–	–	10,603
Ottawa East	OTT		Lib	4,635	59.35%	1,460	18.69%	36.23%	–	–	7,810	–	–	–	–	7,810
Ottawa West	OTT	→	Lib	7,362	40.15%	892	4.87%	41.55%	7,624	–	7,362	2,086	1,263	–	–	18,335
Oxford North	MWO	→	UFO	4,019	40.29%	826	8.28%	64.65%	3,193	4,019	2,762	–	–	–	–	9,974
Oxford South	MWO	→	Con	3,889	39.20%	755	7.61%	69.74%	3,889	3,134	2,898	–	–	–	–	9,921
Parkdale	TOR		Con	6,050	79.76%	4,515	59.53%	30.68%	6,050	–	1,535	–	–	–	–	7,585
Parry Sound	NOR	→	Con	4,876	56.10%	2,579	29.67%	61.07%	4,876	1,519	2,297	–	–	–	–	8,692
Peel	CEN		Con	6,087	56.34%	1,369	12.67%	—N/a	6,087	4,718	–	–	–	–	–	10,805
Perth North	MWO	→	Con	6,289	51.68%	410	3.37%	59.60%	6,289	–	5,879	–	–	–	–	12,168
Perth South	MWO	→	Con	3,454	50.34%	46	0.67%	63.51%	3,454	3,408	–	–	–	–	–	6,862
Peterborough East	CEN	→	Con	2,550	52.35%	229	4.70%	—N/a	2,550	2,321	–	–	–	–	–	4,871
Peterborough West	CEN	→	Con	4,278	44.37%	904	9.38%	57.87%	4,278	–	3,374	1,990	–	–	–	9,642
Port Arthur	NOR		Con	2,331	40.27%	727	12.56%	58.19%	2,331	1,346	1,604	–	508	–	–	5,789
Prescott	EAS	→	Ind	3,608	52.87%	740	10.84%	58.92%	–	–	2,868	348	3,608	–	–	6,824
Prince Edward	EAS	→	Con	4,039	50.12%	19	0.24%	71.12%	4,039	–	4,020	–	–	–	–	8,059
Rainy River	NOR	→	Lab	1,738	42.72%	148	3.64%	65.94%	1,590	–	740	1,738	–	–	–	4,068
Renfrew North	EAS	→	Con	4,235	50.65%	108	1.29%	63.48%	4,235	4,127	–	–	–	–	–	8,362
Renfrew South	EAS		UFO	3,653	37.41%	585	5.99%	67.45%	3,044	3,653	3,068	–	–	–	–	9,765
Riverdale	TOR	→	Con	11,074	79.05%	9,309	66.45%	35.56%	11,074	–	1,765	1,169	–	–	–	14,008
Russell	EAS		Lib	4,648	72.94%	2,924	45.89%	35.35%	–	1,724	4,648	–	–	–	–	6,372
St. Catharines	HAM	→	Con	5,364	55.81%	2,490	25.91%	49.90%	5,364	–	2,874	1,374	–	–	–	9,612
Sault Ste. Marie	NOR	→	Con	2,839	43.27%	444	6.77%	43.28%	2,839	–	2,395	1,327	–	–	–	6,561
Simcoe Centre	CEN	→	Con	3,535	39.84%	529	5.96%	65.77%	3,535	3,006	2,332	–	–	–	–	8,873
Simcoe East	CEN	→	Con	5,692	57.57%	1,498	15.15%	57.55%	5,692	4,194	–	–	–	–	–	9,886
Simcoe South	CEN	→	Con	3,016	55.88%	635	11.77%	72.26%	3,016	2,381	–	–	–	–	–	5,397
Simcoe West	CEN		Con	3,610	56.78%	1,580	24.85%	57.05%	3,610	2,030	634	–	84	–	–	6,358
Stormont	EAS	→	Con	3,661	44.04%	1,050	12.63%	56.13%	3,661	2,041	2,611	–	–	–	–	8,313
Sturgeon Falls	NOR		Lib	2,671	62.32%	1,670	38.96%	—N/a	614	1,001	2,671	–	–	–	–	4,286
Sudbury	NOR		Con	5,816	58.65%	1,816	17.31%	60.80%	5,816	–	4,100	–	–	–	–	9,916
Timiskaming	NOR		Con	3,160	44.12%	1,008	14.07%	58.76%	3,160	2,152	1,850	–	–	–	–	7,162
Toronto NE - A	TOR		Con	13,049	71.46%	10,205	55.88%	34.78%	13,049	–	2,844	–	–	–	2,368	18,261
Toronto NE - B	TOR		Con	13,952	77.58%	9,919	55.15%	34.61%	13,952	–	–	–	–	–	4,033	17,985
Toronto NW - A	TOR		Con	17,255	85.34%	14,291	70.68%	34.17%	17,255	–	2,964	–	–	–	–	20,219
Toronto NW - B	TOR	→	Con	14,703	70.46%	10,982	52.63%	34.34%	14,703	–	–	–	–	2,443	3,721	20,867
Toronto SE - A	TOR	→	Con	7,730	81.56%	7,019	74.06%	31.85%	7,730	–	1,037	711	–	–	–	9,478
Toronto SE - B	TOR	→	Con	7,216	77.13%	5,986	63.98%	31.60%	7,216	–	1,230	910	–	–	–	9,356
Toronto SW - A	TOR	→	Con	8,233	56.71%	4,761	37.39%	50.78%	8,233	–	3,472	2,812	–	–	–	14,517
Toronto SW - B	TOR	→	Con	7,756	52.54%	5,158	37.48%	48.28%	7,756	–	2,198	2,211	–	2,598	–	14,763
Victoria North	CEN	→	Con	2,711	47.00%	358	6.21%	66.72%	2,711	2,353	704	–	–	–	–	5,768
Victoria South	CEN	→	Con	3,880	42.64%	526	5.78%	75.56%	3,880	3,354	1,865	–	–	–	–	9,099
Waterloo North	MWO	→	Con	5,370	50.35%	2,237	20.98%	47.96%	5,370	–	3,133	309	1,853	–	–	10,665
Waterloo South (Note: Incumbent was elected as Farmer-Labour in 1919)	MWO	→	Lab	5,006	50.08%	15	0.15%	47.29%	4,991	–	–	5,006	–	–	–	9,997
Welland	HAM	→	Con	4,941	52.19%	1,239	13.09%	59.17%	4,941	824	3,702	–	–	–	–	9,467
Wellington East	MWO		UFO	3,628	61.64%	1,370	23.28%	61.32%	2,258	3,628	–	–	–	–	–	5,886
Wellington South	MWO		Con	5,444	52.04%	2,424	23.17%	60.12%	5,444	3,020	1,997	–	–	–	–	10,461
Wellington West	MWO	→	Con	2,685	50.41%	576	10.81%	65.13%	2,685	2,109	532	–	–	–	–	5,326
Wentworth North	HAM		UFO	3,397	58.02%	939	16.04%	65.80%	2,458	3,397	–	–	–	–	–	5,855
Wentworth South	HAM	→	Con	3,348	46.38%	889	12.32%	49.57%	3,348	2,459	1,411	–	–	–	–	7,218
Windsor	SWO	→	Con	5,424	53.29%	1,871	18.38%	34.99%	5,424	–	3,553	1,202	–	–	–	10,179
York East	CEN		Con	11,863	71.36%	8,783	52.84%	32.85%	11,863	3,080	976	–	704	–	–	16,623
York North	CEN		Con	4,341	44.65%	811	8.34%	69.77%	4,341	1,852	3,530	–	–	–	–	9,723
York West	CEN		Con	14,338	72.10%	8,791	44.21%	33.00%	14,338	–	–	–	5,547	–	–	19,885

= turnout is above provincial average
= incumbent re-elected under the same party banner
= returned by acclamation
= incumbency arose from byelection gain
= incumbent switched allegiance for 1923 nomination
= other incumbents renominated
= multiple candidates

=== Regional analysis ===
Distribution of candidates, seats and popular vote %, by party by region (1923)
Region	Candidates							Seats					Vote share (%)						
Region	Con	UFO	Lib	Lab	Ind	I-Lib	Prog	Con	UFO	Lib	Lab	Ind	Con	UFO	Lib	Lab	Ind	I-Lib	Prog
Central Ontario	19	12	12	1	1	–	–	16	–	3	–	–	53.12	23.84	21.44	1.54	0.07	–	–
Eastern Ontario	14	12	9	2	3	–	–	11	1	4	–	1	39.87	26.89	27.44	1.93	3.87	–	–
Hamilton, Halton and Niagara	9	5	8	4	–	–	–	7	2	–	–	–	49.64	14.86	24.64	10.86	–	–	–
Midwestern Ontario	20	17	12	3	1	–	–	10	8	1	2	–	42.57	31.87	18.06	6.42	1.08	–	–
Northeastern Ontario	9	5	8	3	1	–	–	5	1	3	–	–	43.34	14.41	35.18	6.88	0.19	–	–
Northwest Ontario	3	1	3	3	3	–	–	2	–	–	2	–	39.85	7.90	20.52	25.81	5.92	–	–
Southwestern Ontario	13	14	14	2	1	–	–	10	4	2	–	–	39.44	30.24	26.87	2.54	0.91	–	–
Toronto	10	–	9	5	–	2	3	10	–	–	–	–	72.78	–	11.59	5.31	–	3.43	6.88
York, Peel and Ontario	6	5	3	–	2	–	–	4	1	1	–	–	58.58	20.97	11.91	–	8.54	–	–
Total	103	71	78	23	12	2	3	75	17	14	4	1	49.77	20.94	21.33	4.75	1.62	0.53	1.06

=== MLAs elected ===
Italicized names indicate members returned by acclamation. Two-tone colour boxes indicate ridings that turned over from the 1919 election, e.g.,

(Conservative in 1923 and UFO in 1919)

Central Ontario

Addington: William David Black
Durham East: Albert James Fallis
Durham West: William John Bragg
Hastings East: James Ferguson Hill
Hastings North: John Robert Cooke
Hastings West: William Henry Ireland
Lennox: John Perry Vrooman
Muskoka: George Walter Ecclestone
Northumberland East: James Franklin Beatty Belford
Northumberland West: Samuel Clarke
Peterborough East: Thomas Dalton Johnston
Peterborough West: William Herbert Bradburn
Prince Edward: Horace Stanley Colliver
Simcoe Centre: Charles Ernest Wright
Simcoe East: William Finlayson
Simcoe South: William Earl Rowe
Simcoe West: James Edgar Jamieson
Victoria North: James Raglan Mark
Victoria South: Robert John Patterson

Eastern Ontario

Brockville: Hezekiah Allan Clark
Carleton: Adam Holland Acres
Dundas: Aaron Sweet
Frontenac: Anthony McGuin Rankin
Glengarry: James Alexander Sangster
Grenville: George Howard Ferguson
Kingston: William Folger Nickle
Lanark North: Thomas Alfred Thompson
Lanark South: Egerton Reuben Stedman
Leeds: Andrew Wellington Gray
Ottawa East: Joseph Albert Pinard
Ottawa West: Harold Fisher
Prescott: Edmond Proulx
Renfrew North: Alexander Stuart
Renfrew South: John Carty
Russell: Aurélien Bélanger
Stormont: John Colborne Milligan

Hamilton/Halton/Niagara

Halton: George Hillmer
Hamilton East: Leeming Carr
Hamilton West: Arthur Campbell Garden
Lincoln: Robert Henry Kemp
Niagara Falls: William Gore Willson
St. Catharines: Edwin Cyrus Graves
Welland: Marshall Vaughan
Wentworth North: Frank Campbell Biggs
Wentworth South: Thomas Joseph Mahony

Midwestern Ontario

Brant: Harry Corwin Nixon
Brant South: Morrison Mann MacBride
Bruce North: William Henry Fenton
Bruce South: Malcolm Alex McCallum
Bruce West: Alexander Patterson Mewhinney
Dufferin: Charles Robert McKeown
Grey Centre: Dougall Carmichael
Grey North: David James Taylor
Grey South: David Jamieson
Haldimand: Richard Nixon Berry
Norfolk North: George David Sewell
Norfolk South: John Strickler Martin
Oxford North: David Munroe Ross
Oxford South: William Henry Chambers
Perth North: Joseph Dunsmore Monteith
Perth South: McCausland Irvine
Waterloo North: William George Weichel
Waterloo South: Karl Kenneth Homuth
Wellington East: William Raney
Wellington South: Lincoln Goldie
Wellington West: William Clarke Chambers

Northeastern Ontario

Algoma: Arthur Gladstone Wallis
Cochrane: Malcolm Lang
Manitoulin: Beniah Bowman
Nipissing: Henri Morel
Parry Sound: George Vernon Harcourt
Sault Ste. Marie: James Lyons
Sturgeon Falls: Zotique Mageau
Sudbury: Charles McCrea
Timiskaming: Angus John Kennedy

Northwest Ontario

Fort William: Franklin Harford Spence
Kenora: Peter Heenan
Port Arthur: Francis Henry Keefer
Rainy River: John Fullarton Callan

Southwestern Ontario

Elgin East: Michael McKnight
Elgin West: Findlay George MacDiarmid
Essex North: Edward Philip Tellier
Essex South: Adolphus T. Armstrong
Huron Centre: Ebon Rinaldo Wigle
Huron North: John Joynt
Huron South: Nelson William Trewartha
Kent East: Manning William Doherty
Kent West: Robert Livingstone Brackin
Lambton East: Leslie Warner Oke
Lambton West: Wilfred Smith Haney
London: Adam Beck
Middlesex East: John Willard Freeborn
Middlesex North: George Adam Elliott
Middlesex West: John Giles Lethbridge
Windsor: Frank Worthington Wilson

Toronto

Parkdale: William Herbert Price
Riverdale: George Oakley
Toronto Northeast - A: Alexander Cameron Lewis
Toronto Northeast - B: Joseph Elijah Thompson
Toronto Northwest - A: Thomas Crawford
Toronto Northwest - B: Arthur Russell Nesbitt
Toronto Southeast - A: John Allister Currie
Toronto Southeast - B: Edward William James Owens
Toronto Southwest - A: James Arthur McCausland
Toronto Southwest - B: Frederick George McBrien

York/Peel/Ontario

Ontario North: John Wesley Widdifield
Ontario South: William Edmund Newton Sinclair
Peel: Thomas Laird Kennedy
York East: George Stewart Henry
York North: William Keith
York West: Forbes Godfrey

=== Detailed analysis ===
Seats and popular vote by party
Party	Seats	Votes	Change (pp)
█ Conservative	75 / 111	49.56%	15.47
█ United Farmers	17 / 111	21.11%	0.14
█ Liberal	14 / 111	21.36%	-4.15
█ Labour	4 / 111	4.76%	-4.33
█ Independent	1 / 111	1.62%	-2.45
█ Other	0 / 111	1.59%	-4.68

Party rankings (1st to 5th place)
Party	Acc	1st	2nd	3rd	4th	5th
█ Conservative	1	74	22	5	1	
█ United Farmers		17	43	11		
█ Liberal		14	35	27	2	
█ Labour	1	3	5	13	1	
█ Independent		1	1	1	6	2
█ Progressive			2	1		
█ Independent-Liberal			1	1		
Totals	2	109	109	59	10	2

Party candidates in 2nd place
Party in 1st place	Con	UFO	Lib	Lab	Ind	Pro
█ Conservative		37	29	4	2	2
█ United Farmers	14		3			
█ Liberal	6	6	1	1		
█ Labour	2		1			
█ Independent			1			
Totals	22	43	35	5	2	2

Principal races, according to 1st and 2nd-place results
Parties		Seats
█ Conservative	█ United Farmers	51
█ Conservative	█ Liberal	35
█ Liberal	█ United Farmers	9
█ Conservative	█ Labour	6
█ Conservative	█ Progressive	2
█ Liberal	█ Labour	2
█ Conservative	█ Independent	1
█ Conservative	█ Independent-Liberal	1
█ Liberal	█ Liberal	1
█ Independent	█ Liberal	1
Total		109

=== Incumbents not running for reelection ===
Sixteen MLAs chose not to stand for re-election:

Riding	Incumbent at dissolution and subsequent nominee		New MLA
Algoma	Kenneth Spencer Stover	Arthur Gladstone Wallis	Arthur Gladstone Wallis
Elgin East	Malcolm MacVicar	William F. Smith	Michael McKnight
Essex South	Milton C. Fox	John Orville Duke	Adolphus T. Armstrong
Huron South	Andrew Hicks	William George Medd	Nelson William Trewartha
Lennox	Reginald Amherst Fowler	Charles Wesley Hambly	John Perry Vrooman
Middlesex North	James C. Brown	Harold Currie	George Adam Elliott
Ottawa West	Hammett Pinhey Hill	Albert Edwin Honeywell	Harold Fisher
Oxford South	Albert Thomas Walker	John L. Wright	William Henry Chambers
Port Arthur	Donald McDonald Hogarth	Francis Henry Keefer	Francis Henry Keefer
Riverdale	Joseph McNamara	—N/a	George Oakley
Russell	Alfred Goulet	Aurélien Bélanger	Aurélien Bélanger
Simcoe West	William Torrance Allen	James Edgar Jamieson	James Edgar Jamieson
Timiskaming	Thomas Magladery	Angus John Kennedy	Angus John Kennedy
Toronto Southeast - B	James Walter Curry	John Callahan	Edward William James Owens
Wellington South	Caleb Henry Buckland	Lincoln Goldie	Lincoln Goldie
York North	Thomas Herbert Lennox	William Keith	William Keith

=== Seats that changed hands ===
Elections to the 16th Parliament of Ontario – seats won/lost by party, 1919–1923
Party	1919	Gain from (loss to)																		1923
Party	1919	Con		UFO		Lib		Lab		Ind		I-Lib		F-Lab		F-Lib		Sol		1923
Conservative	25			29		13	(2)	9	(1)			1						1		75
United Farmers	44		(29)			3	(2)									1				17
Liberal	27	2	(13)	2	(3)						(1)									14
Labour	11	1	(9)											1						4
Independent	–					1														1
Independent-Liberal	1		(1)																	–
Farmer–Labour	1								(1)											–
Farmer-Liberal	1				(1)															–
Soldier	1		(1)																	–
Total	111	3	(53)	31	(4)	17	(4)	9	(2)	–	(1)	1	–	1	–	1	–	1	–	111

There were 64 seats that changed allegiance in the election.

UFO to Conservative

- Carleton
- Dufferin
- Dundas
- Durham East
- Elgin East
- Elgin West
- Essex South
- Grey South
- Haldimand
- Halton
- Hastings East
- Huron South
- Lambton West
- Lanark North
- Lanark South
- Middlesex North
- Norfolk South
- Northumberland East
- Oxford South
- Perth South
- Peterborough East
- Renfrew North
- Simcoe Centre
- Simcoe East
- Simcoe South
- Victoria North
- Victoria South
- Wellington West
- Wentworth South

UFO to Liberal

- Essex North
- Glengarry

Liberal to Conservative

- Brockville
- Nipissing
- Parry Sound
- Perth North
- Prince Edward
- Stormont
- Toronto Northwest - B
- Toronto Southeast - A
- Toronto Southeast - B
- Toronto Southwest - A
- Toronto Southwest - B
- Welland
- Windsor

Liberal to UFO

- Bruce South
- Lincoln
- Oxford North

Liberal to Independent

- Prescott

Labour to Conservative

- Fort William
- Hamilton East
- Hamilton West
- Huron Centre
- London
- Niagara Falls
- Peterborough West
- Sault Ste. Marie
- St. Catharines

Independent-Liberal to Conservative

- Waterloo North

Farmer-Labour to Labour

- Waterloo South

Farmer-Liberal to UFO

- Grey North

Soldier to Conservative

- Riverdale

Conservative to Liberal

- Lennox
- Ottawa West

Conservative to Labour

- Rainy River

Resulting composition of the 16th Legislative Assembly of Ontario
Source		Party					
Source		Con	UFO	Lib	Lab	Ind	Total
Seats retained	Incumbents returned	16	13	8	1		38
Seats retained	Open seats held	5		2			7
Seats retained	Acclamation	1			1		2
Seats changing hands	Incumbents defeated	45	2	2	1	1	51
Seats changing hands	Open seats gained	7		2			9
Seats changing hands	Byelection gain held	1	1				2
Seats changing hands	Change in affiliation		1		1		2
Total		75	17	14	4	1	111

=== Notable groups of candidates ===
Women candidates in the 1923 election
Riding	Candidate		Votes	Placed
Fort William	█ Liberal	Mrs B.O. Allen	1,152	3rd
Toronto Northeast - B	█ Progressive	Mrs Mary E. Becker	4,033	2nd
Toronto Northwest - B	█ United Farmers	Edith L. Groves	3,721	2nd

Candidates returned by acclamation
Riding	Party	Candidate
Kenora	█ Labour	Peter Heenan
Kingston	█ Conservative	William Folger Nickle

Dual nominations in the 1923 election
Riding	Candidate		Votes	Placed
Ottawa East	█ Liberal	Joseph Albert Pinard	4,635	1st
Ottawa East	█ Liberal	J. Wilfred Gauvreau	3,175	2nd
Ottawa West	█ Conservative	Albert Edwin Honeywell	6,470	2nd
Ottawa West	█ Conservative	Arthur Ellis	1,154	4th
Toronto Southeast - A	█ Liberal	Frederick Hogg	656	3rd
Toronto Southeast - A	█ Liberal	Alfred Burgess	381	4th

== See also ==
- Politics of Ontario
- List of Ontario political parties
- Premier of Ontario
- Leader of the Opposition (Ontario)
