= Bowen Ebenezer Aylsworth =

Canadian politician (1835–1914)

Ontario MPP
- In office 1898–1902
- Preceded by: George Douglas Hawley
- Succeeded by: Thomas George Carscallen
- Constituency: Lennox

Personal details
- Born: January 12, 1835 Ernestown Township, Lennox County, Canada West
- Died: November 10, 1914 (aged 79) Lennox and Addington County, Ontario
- Party: Liberal
- Spouse: Elizabeth Ann Mills (m. 1865)

Bowen Ebenezer Aylsworth (January 12, 1835 – November 10, 1914) was an Ontario political figure. He represented Lennox in the Legislative Assembly of Ontario from 1898 to 1902 as a Liberal member.

He was born in Ernestown Township, Lennox County, Canada West, the son of David Aylsworth. He was reeve for the township from 1888 to 1889. In 1865, he married Elizabeth Ann Mills. Aylsworth was warden for Lennox and Addington Counties in 1897. He was an unsuccessful candidate for a seat in the provincial assembly in 1890. His election in 1898 was declared void, but he won the subsequent by-election in 1899. He died in 1914 and was buried in Lennox and Addington County, Ontario.
