= Huron Centre (provincial electoral district) =

Former provincial electoral district in Ontario, Canada

Ontario electoral district

Defunct provincial electoral district
- Legislature: Legislative Assembly of Ontario
- District created: 1908
- District abolished: 1923
- First contested: 1908
- Last contested: 1923

Huron Centre was a provincial electoral district in Ontario, Canada. It existed from 1908 to 1926 and consisted of the central areas of Huron County.

== Members of Provincial Parliament ==
Huron Centre
Assembly	Years	Member	Party
Riding created from Huron East, Huron South & Huron West
12th	1908–1911	William Proudfoot	Liberal
13th	1911–1914	William Proudfoot	Liberal
14th	1914–1919	William Proudfoot	Liberal
15th	1919–1923	John Govenlock	Labour
16th	1923–1926	Ebon Rinaldo Wigle	Conservative
Riding renamed Huron North and Huron South

== Election results ==
1923 Ontario general election
Party	Candidate	Votes	%	±%
Conservative	Ebon Rinaldo Wigle	3,133	41.58	–
Liberal	John Govenlock	2,409	31.98	–6.67
United Farmers	William Robert Sommerville	1,992	26.44	+1.76
Total valid votes		7,534	99.45	
Total rejected ballots		42	0.55	–2.81
Turnout		7,576	66.47	–11.92
Eligible voters		11,398		
Conservative gain from Labour		Swing		–
Source: Elections Ontario

1919 Ontario general election
Party	Candidate	Votes	%	±%
Labour	John Govenlock	3,193	38.65	–
Independent	William Proudfoot	3,030	36.67	–17.30
United Farmers	Robert William Livingstone	2,039	24.68	–
Total valid votes		8,262	96.63	
Total rejected ballots		288	3.37	+2.92
Turnout		8,550	78.39	–9.33
Eligible voters		10,907		
Labour gain from Liberal		Swing		–
Source: Elections Ontario

1914 Ontario general election
Party	Candidate	Votes	%	±%
Liberal	William Proudfoot	2,165	53.98	+1.33
Conservative	Alfred H. Macklin	1,846	46.02	–1.33
Total valid votes		4,011	99.55	
Total rejected ballots		18	0.45	+0.20
Turnout		4,029	87.72	+10.57
Eligible voters		4,593		
Liberal hold		Swing		+1.33
Source: Elections Ontario

1911 Ontario general election
Party	Candidate	Votes	%	±%
Liberal	William Proudfoot	2,148	52.65	+0.54
Conservative	Joseph Elliott	1,932	47.35	–0.54
Total valid votes		4,080	99.76	
Total rejected ballots		10	0.24	–0.24
Turnout		4,090	77.16	–1.52
Eligible voters		5,301		
Liberal hold		Swing		+0.54
Source: Elections Ontario

1908 Ontario general election
Party	Candidate	Votes	%
Liberal	William Proudfoot	2,051	52.11
Conservative	Andrew Porter	1,885	47.89
Total valid votes		3,936	99.52
Total rejected ballots		19	0.48
Turnout		3,955	78.68
Eligible voters		5,027	
Liberal pickup new district.			
Source: Elections Ontario

== See also ==
- List of Ontario provincial electoral districts
- Canadian provincial electoral districts
