= Windsor, CA =

Windsor, CA may refer to:

- Windsor, Ontario, Canada, a city
  - Windsor (Ontario provincial electoral district)
- Windsor, Quebec, Canada, a town
- Windsor, Nova Scotia, Canada, a community
- Windsor, California, United States, a town
