= Wilson A. Crockett =

Canadian politician from Ontario

Member of the Ontario Provincial Parliament for Wentworth South
- In office October 20, 1919 – May 10, 1923
- Preceded by: James Regan
- Succeeded by: Thomas Joseph Mahony

Personal details
- Party: United Farmers

Wilson A. Crockett was a Canadian politician from Ontario. He represented Wentworth South in the Legislative Assembly of Ontario from 1919 to 1923.

== See also ==
- 15th Parliament of Ontario
