= John Govenlock =

Canadian politician from Ontario

Member of the Ontario Provincial Parliament for Huron Centre
- In office October 20, 1919 – May 10, 1923
- Preceded by: William Proudfoot
- Succeeded by: Ebon Rinaldo Wigle

Personal details
- Party: Labour

John M. Govenlock was a Canadian politician from the Labour Party. He represented Huron Centre in the Legislative Assembly of Ontario from 1919 to 1923.

== Political career ==
Govenlock entered provincial politics in the 1919 Ontario general election. He contested the riding of Huron Centre during a period of political realignment in Ontario following the First World War.

In the election, Govenlock defeated former Ontario Liberal leader William Proudfoot, who ran as an independent candidate, and United Farmers candidate Robert Livingstone. Govenlock received 3,193 votes, compared to 3,030 for Proudfoot and 2,039 for Livingstone.

Govenlock served in the 15th Parliament of Ontario from 1919 to 1923 as one of a small number of Labour members elected to the Legislative Assembly. His election coincided with the victory of the United Farmers of Ontario under Premier Ernest C. Drury, who governed with support from Labour members.

Following the redistribution of Ontario's electoral districts, Huron Centre was abolished. Govenlock sought re-election in the 1923 Ontario general election but was defeated by Conservative candidate Ebon Rinaldo Wigle. Running as a Liberal candidate, he received 2,409 votes to Wigle's 3,133.

== Legacy ==
Although little biographical information about Govenlock has survived, his election reflected the strength of labour and reform movements in Ontario politics following the First World War. He represented Huron Centre during the only period in which the United Farmers–Labour alliance formed the government of Ontario.

== See also ==
- 15th Parliament of Ontario
- List of United Farmers/Labour MLAs in the Ontario legislature
