= Thomas George Carscallen =

Canadian politician

Ontario MPP
- In office 1902–1917
- Preceded by: Walter William Meacham
- Succeeded by: Reginald Amherst Fowler
- Constituency: Lennox

Personal details
- Born: April 9, 1842 North Fredericksburgh Township, Lennox County, Canada West
- Died: March 15, 1917 (aged 74) Napanee, Ontario
- Party: Conservative
- Spouse: Melinda Mair (m. 1873)
- Occupation: Undertaker

Thomas George Carscallen (April 9, 1842 – March 15, 1917) was an Ontario political figure. He represented Lennox in the Legislative Assembly of Ontario from 1902 to 1917 as a Conservative member.

He was born in North Fredericksburgh Township, Lennox County, Canada West, the son of Isaac Carscallen. Carscallen began work as a painter but later became an undertaker in partnership with his brother John. In 1873, he married Melinda Mair. Carscallen served on the town council for Napanee, serving eight years as reeve and serving as mayor from 1889 to 1890 and from 1900 to 1901. He was also warden for the United Counties of Lennox and Addington in 1888. He died of pneumonia in Napanee in 1917 while still in office.
