= Electoral district of Windsor =

Electoral district of Windsor may refer to:

- Windsor (UK Parliament constituency), a current constituency of the UK House of Commons
- Windsor (Ontario provincial electoral district), a former riding of the Ontario Provincial Parliament
- Electoral district of Windsor (New South Wales), a former electorate of the New South Wales Legislative Assembly
- Electoral district of Windsor (Queensland), a former electorate of the Queensland Legislative Assembly
