= 16th Parliament of Ontario =

1923–1926 term of the Legislative Assembly of Ontario, Canada

←	15th	17th	→
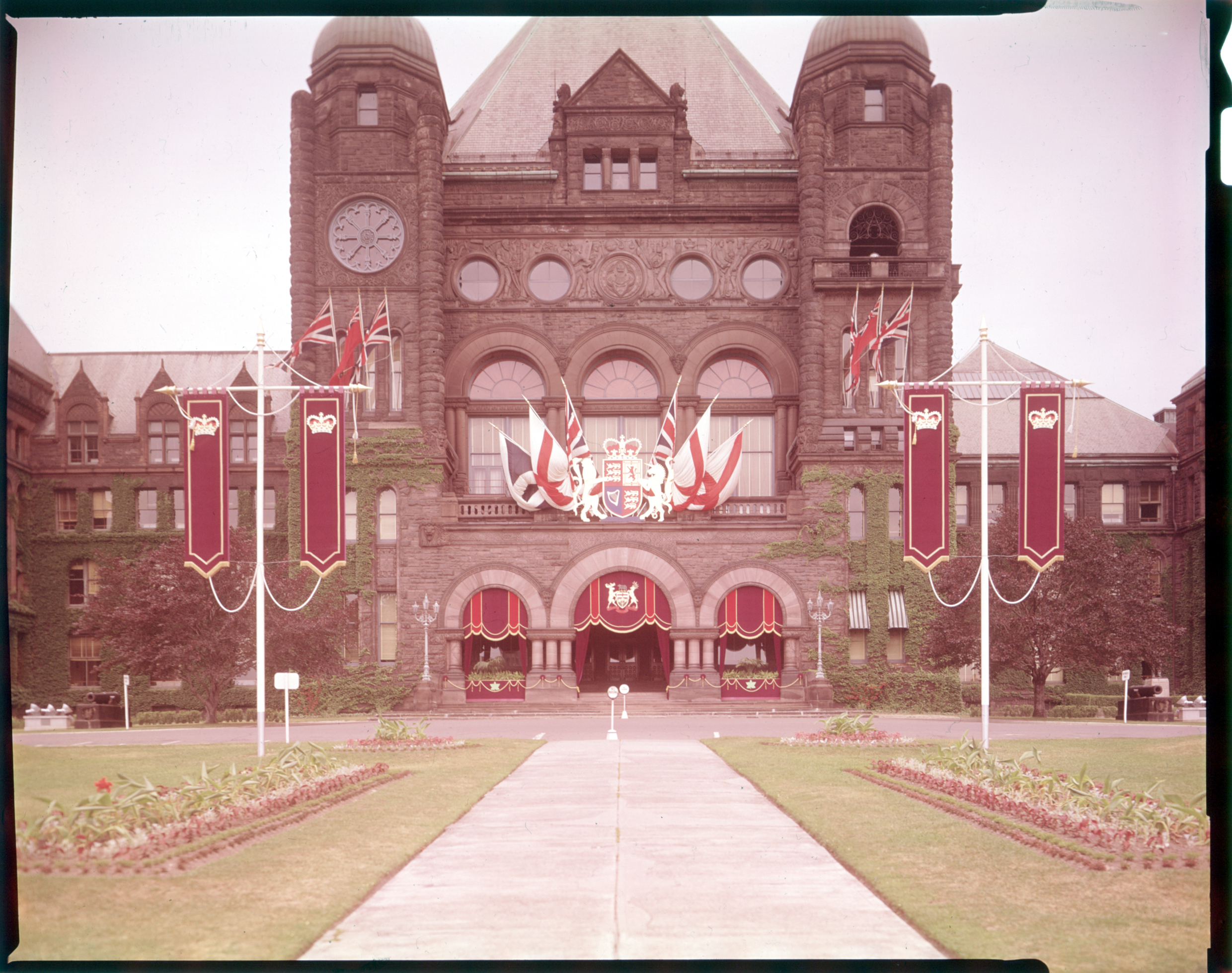
- Ontario Legislative Building ca. 1948

Overview
- Legislative body: Legislative Assembly
- Jurisdiction: Ontario, Canada
- Meeting place: Ontario Legislative Building
- Term: June 25, 1923 (election) – October 8th, 1926 (dissolution)
- Election: 1923 Election
- Government: Ferguson ministry (Conservative)
- Members: 111
- Speaker: Joseph Thompson
- Premier: Howard Ferguson (Conservative)
- Leader of the Opposition: W.E.N. Sinclair (Liberal)
- Party control: 75 / 111(68%)

The 16th Legislative Assembly of Ontario was in session from June 25, 1923, until October 18, 1926, just prior to the 1926 general election. The majority party was the Ontario Conservative Party led by George Howard Ferguson.

The United Farmers of Ontario party, who had held the balance of power in the preceding assembly, lost most of their seats to Conservatives.

The Liberals led by W. E. N. Sinclair were recognized as the Official Opposition following the 1923 election by the governing Conservatives, despite the fact that the United Farmers of Ontario had more seats. According to historian Peter Oliver, this was an arbitrary decision without basis in precedent or law. Conservative Premier G. Howard Ferguson used as justification an announcement by UFO general secretary James J. Morrison that the UFO would be withdrawing from party politics, though Oliver argues that this was facetious logic. UFO parliamentary leader Manning Doherty protested the decision, but to no avail. In the course of the parliament, most UFO MLAs reorganized themselves as the Progressive Party under the leadership of first Manning Doherty and then William Raney, with only Beniah Bowman and Leslie Warner Oke continuing as UFO MLAs.

Joseph Elijah Thompson served as speaker for the assembly.

== Members of the Assembly ==
Listing reflects the UFO/Progressive split in 1924. Italicized names indicate members returned by acclamation.

Riding	Member	Party	First elected / previously elected	No. of terms
Addington	William David Black	Conservative	1911	4th term
Algoma	Arthur Gladstone Wallis	Liberal	1923	1st term
Brant	Harry Corwin Nixon	United Farmers	1919	2nd term
Brant South	Morrison Mann MacBride	Labour	1919	2nd term
Brockville	Hezekiah Allan Clark	Conservative	1923	1st term
Bruce North	William Henry Fenton	United Farmers	1919	2nd term
Bruce South	Malcolm Alex McCallum	United Farmers	1923	1st term
Bruce West	Alexander Patterson Mewhinney	Liberal	1919	2nd term
Carleton	Adam Holland Acres	Conservative	1923	1st term
Cochrane	Malcolm Lang	Liberal	1914	3rd term
Dufferin	Charles Robert McKeown	Conservative	1907, 1923	5th term*
Dundas	Aaron Sweet	Conservative	1923	1st term
Durham East	Albert James Fallis	Conservative	1923	1st term
Durham West	William John Bragg	Liberal	1919	2nd term
Elgin East	Michael McKnight	Conservative	1923	1st term
Elgin West	Findlay George MacDiarmid	Conservative	1898, 1899, 1923	8th term*
Essex North	Edward Philip Tellier	Liberal	1923	1st term
Essex South	Adolphus T. Armstrong	Conservative	1923	1st term
Fort William	Franklin Harford Spence	Conservative	1923	1st term
Frontenac	Anthony McGuin Rankin	Conservative	1911	4th term
Glengarry	James Alexander Sangster	Liberal	1923	1st term
Grenville	George Howard Ferguson	Conservative	1905	6th term
Grey Centre	Dougall Carmichael	United Farmers	1919	2nd term
Grey North	David James Taylor	United Farmers	1919	2nd term
Grey South	David Jamieson	Conservative	1898, 1923	7th term*
Haldimand	Richard Nixon Berry	Conservative	1923	1st term
Halton	George Hillmer	Conservative	1923	1st term
Hamilton East	Leeming Carr	Conservative	1923	1st term
Hamilton West	Arthur Campbell Garden	Conservative	1923	1st term
Hastings East	James Ferguson Hill	Conservative	1923	1st term
Hastings North	John Robert Cooke	Conservative	1911	4th term
Hastings West	William Henry Ireland	Conservative	1919	2nd term
Huron Centre	Ebon Rinaldo Wigle	Conservative	1923	1st term
Huron North	John Joynt	Conservative	1919	2nd term
Huron South	Nelson William Trewartha	Conservative	1923	1st term
Kenora	Peter Heenan	Labour	1919	2nd term
Kent East	Manning William Doherty	United Farmers	1920	2nd term
Kent West	Robert Livingstone Brackin	Liberal	1919	2nd term
Kingston	William Folger Nickle	Conservative	1908, 1922	3rd term*
Lambton East	Leslie Warner Oke	United Farmers (Note: Oke and Bowman sat as their own UFO faction after January 1925)	1919	2nd term
Lambton West	Wilfred Smith Haney	Conservative	1923	1st term
Lanark North	Thomas Alfred Thompson	Conservative	1923	1st term
Lanark South	Egerton Reuben Stedman	Conservative	1923	1st term
Leeds	Andrew Wellington Gray	Conservative	1919	2nd term
Lennox	John Perry Vrooman (Note: died in 1923)	Liberal	1923	1st term
Lennox	Charles Wesley Hambly (1924)	Conservative	1924	1st term
Lincoln	Robert Henry Kemp	United Farmers	1923	1st term
London	Adam Beck	Conservative	1902, 1923	6th term*
Manitoulin	Beniah Bowman	United Farmers	1918	3rd term
Middlesex East	John Willard Freeborn	United Farmers	1919	2nd term
Middlesex North	George Adam Elliott	Conservative	1923	1st term
Middlesex West	John Giles Lethbridge	United Farmers	1919	2nd term
Muskoka	George Walter Ecclestone	Conservative	1919	2nd term
Niagara Falls	William Gore Willson	Conservative	1923	1st term
Nipissing	Henri Morel	Conservative	1908, 1923	4th term*
Norfolk North	George David Sewell	United Farmers	1919	2nd term
Norfolk South	John Strickler Martin	Conservative	1923	1st term
Northumberland East	James Franklin Beatty Belford	Conservative	1923	1st term
Northumberland West	Samuel Clarke	Liberal	1898	8th term
Ontario North	John Wesley Widdifield	United Farmers	1919	3rd term
Ontario South	William Edmund Newton Sinclair	Liberal	1911, 1919	3rd term*
Ottawa East	Joseph Albert Pinard	Liberal	1914	3rd term
Ottawa West	Harold Fisher	Liberal	1923	1st term
Oxford North	David Munroe Ross	United Farmers	1921	2nd term
Oxford South	William Henry Chambers	Conservative	1923	1st term
Parkdale	William Herbert Price	Conservative	1914	3rd term
Parry Sound	George Vernon Harcourt	Conservative	1923	1st term
Peel	Thomas Laird Kennedy	Conservative	1919	2nd term
Perth North	Joseph Dunsmore Monteith	Conservative	1923	1st term
Perth South	McCausland Irvine	Conservative	1923	1st term
Peterborough East	Thomas Dalton Johnston	Conservative	1923	1st term
Peterborough West	William Herbert Bradburn	Conservative	1923	1st term
Port Arthur	Francis Henry Keefer	Conservative	1923	1st term
Prescott	Edmond Proulx	Independent	1923	1st term
Prince Edward	Horace Stanley Colliver	Conservative	1923	1st term
Rainy River	John Fullarton Callan	Labour	1923	1st term
Renfrew North	Alexander Stuart	Conservative	1923	1st term
Renfrew South	John Carty	United Farmers	1919	2nd term
Riverdale	George Oakley	Conservative	1923	1st term
Russell	Aurélien Bélanger	Liberal	1923	1st term
Sault Ste. Marie	James Lyons	Conservative	1923	1st term
Simcoe Centre	Charles Ernest Wright	Conservative	1923	1st term
Simcoe East	William Finlayson	Conservative	1923	1st term
Simcoe South	William Earl Rowe	Conservative	1923	1st term
Simcoe West	James Edgar Jamieson	Conservative	1923	1st term
St. Catharines	Edwin Cyrus Graves	Conservative	1923	1st term
Stormont	John Colborne Milligan	Conservative	1923	1st term
Sturgeon Falls	Zotique Mageau	Liberal	1911	4th term
Sudbury	Charles McCrea	Conservative	1911	4th term
Timiskaming	Angus John Kennedy	Conservative	1923	1st term
Toronto Northeast - A	Alexander Cameron Lewis	Conservative	1920	2nd term
Toronto Northeast - B	Joseph Elijah Thompson	Conservative	1919	2nd term
Toronto Northwest - A	Thomas Crawford (Note: accepted post)	Conservative	1894	9th term
Toronto Northwest - A	William Henry Edwards (1924)	Conservative	1924	1st term
Toronto Northwest - B	Arthur Russell Nesbitt	Conservative	1923	1st term
Toronto Southeast - A	John Allister Currie	Conservative	1922	2nd term
Toronto Southeast - B	Edward William James Owens	Conservative	1911, 1923	3rd term*
Toronto Southwest - A	James Arthur McCausland	Conservative	1923	1st term
Toronto Southwest - B	Frederick George McBrien	Conservative	1923	1st term
Victoria North	James Raglan Mark	Conservative	1923	1st term
Victoria South	Robert John Patterson	Conservative	1923	1st term
Waterloo North	William George Weichel	Conservative	1923	1st term
Waterloo South	Karl Kenneth Homuth	Labour	1919	2nd term
Welland	Marshall Vaughan	Conservative	1923	1st term
Wellington East	William Edgar Raney	United Farmers	1920	2nd term
Wellington South	Lincoln Goldie	Conservative	1923	1st term
Wellington West	William Clarke Chambers	Conservative	1911, 1923	3rd term*
Wentworth North	Frank Campbell Biggs	United Farmers	1919	2nd term
Wentworth South	Thomas Joseph Mahony	Conservative	1923	1st term
Windsor	Frank Worthington Wilson	Conservative	1923	1st term
York East	George Stewart Henry	Conservative	1913	4th term
York North	William Keith	Conservative	1923	1st term
York West	Forbes Godfrey	Conservative	1907	6th term

== Timeline ==
16th Legislative Assembly of Ontario - Movement in seats held (1923-1926)
Party	1923	Gain/(loss) due to					1926
Party	1923	Party split	Death in office	Resignation as MPP	Byelection gain	Byelection hold	1926
Conservative	75		(1)	(2)	1	1	74
United Farmers	17	(15)		(1)			1
Progressive	–	15		(4)			11
Liberal	14		(2)	(1)			11
Labour	4			(1)			3
Independent	1						1
Vacant	–		2	8			10
Total	111	–	(1)	(1)	1	1	111

Changes in seats held (1923–1926)
Electoral District	Before			Change	
Electoral District	Date	Reason	Member exited	New member	Date
Lennox	August 23, 1923	Death	John Perry Vrooman	Charles Wesley Hambly	October 22, 1923
Toronto Northwest - A	May 15, 1924	Resignation (Note: To accept appointment as registrar of deeds for the City of Toronto.)	Thomas Crawford	William Henry Edwards	July 7, 1924
Simcoe South	April 14, 1925	Resignation (Note: to contest the 1925 federal (dominion) election)	William Earl Rowe	Vacant at dissolution	
Kenora	April 14, 1925	Resignation	Peter Heenan	Vacant at dissolution	
Cochrane	April 14, 1925	Resignation	Malcolm Lang	Vacant at dissolution	
Norfolk North	April 14, 1925	Resignation	George David Sewell	Vacant at dissolution	
Grey Centre	April 14, 1925	Resignation	Dougall Carmichael	Vacant at dissolution	
Kent East	April 14, 1925	Resignation	Manning William Doherty	Vacant at dissolution	
London	August 15, 1925	Death	Adam Beck ⁂	Vacant at dissolution	
Middlesex East	April 8, 1926	Resignation (Note: To contest the 1926 federal (dominion) election)	John Willard Freeborn	Vacant at dissolution	
Manitoulin	April 8, 1926	Resignation	Beniah Bowman	Vacant at dissolution	
Kent West	October 11, 1926	Death	Robert Livingstone Brackin	Vacant at dissolution	
