= Richard Clarke (Ontario politician) =

Canadian politician

Member of the Ontario Provincial Parliament for Northumberland East
- In office February 1, 1888 – August 7, 1888
- Preceded by: William Arnson Willoughby
- Succeeded by: William Arnson Willoughby

Personal details
- Died: August 7, 1888
- Party: Liberal

Richard Clarke was a Canadian politician. He was elected to the Legislative Assembly of Ontario in Northumberland East in a by-election in 1888 and died just months later.

== See also ==
- 6th Parliament of Ontario
