= Lennox (provincial electoral district) =

Former provincial electoral riding in Ontario, Canada

Ontario electoral district

Defunct provincial electoral district
- Legislature: Legislative Assembly of Ontario
- District created: 1867
- District abolished: 1933
- First contested: 1867
- Last contested: 1929

Lennox was an electoral riding in Ontario, Canada. It was created in 1867 at the time of confederation and was abolished in 1933 before the 1934 election.

== Members of Provincial Parliament ==
Lennox
Assembly	Years	Member	Party
1st	1867–1871	John Stevenson	Conservative
2nd	1871–1874	John Thomas Grange	Conservative
3rd	1875–1879	John Thomas Grange	Conservative
4th	1879–1883	George Douglas Hawley	Liberal
5th	1883–1885	Alexander Hall Roe	Conservative
5th	1885–1886	George Douglas Hawley	Liberal
6th	1886–1890	Walter William Meacham	Conservative
7th	1890–1894	Walter William Meacham	Conservative
8th	1894–1898	Walter William Meacham	Conservative
9th	1898–1902	Bowen Ebenezer Aylsworth	Liberal
10th	1902–1904	Thomas George Carscallen	Conservative
11th	1905–1908	Thomas George Carscallen	Conservative
12th	1908–1911	Thomas George Carscallen	Conservative
13th	1911–1914	Thomas George Carscallen	Conservative
14th	1914–1917	Thomas George Carscallen	Conservative
14th	1918–1919	Reginald Amherst Fowler	Conservative
15th	1919–1923	Reginald Amherst Fowler	Conservative
16th	1923–1923	John Perry Vrooman	Liberal
16th	1923–1926	Charles Wesley Hambly	Conservative
Combined with Frontenac to form Frontenac-Lennox
17th	1926–1929	Edward Ming	Liberal
18th	1929–1934	Charles Wesley Hambly	Conservative
Sourced from the Ontario Legislative Assembly
Merged into Prince Edward—Lennox before the 1934 election

== Election results ==
=== Frontenac—Lennox (1926–1934) ===
1929 Ontario general election: Frontenac—Lennox
Party	Candidate	Votes	%	±%
Conservative	Charles Wesley Hambly	4,419	54.77	+8.01
Liberal	Edward Ming	3,650	45.23	–8.01
Total valid votes		8,069	99.40	
Total rejected ballots		49	0.60	–0.12
Turnout		8,118	66.19	–0.31
Eligible voters		12,265		
Conservative gain from Liberal		Swing		+8.01
Source: Elections Ontario

1926 Ontario general election: Frontenac—Lennox
Party	Candidate	Votes	%	±%
Liberal	Edward Ming	4,625	53.24	–
Conservative	Anthony McGuin Rankin	4,062	46.76	–
Total valid votes		8,687	99.28	
Total rejected ballots		63	0.72	–
Turnout		8,750	66.49	–
Eligible voters		13,159		
Liberal notional hold		Swing		–
Source: Elections Ontario

=== Lennox (1867–1926) ===
Ontario provincial by-election, October 22, 1923 Death of John Perry Vrooman
Party	Candidate	Votes	%	±%
Conservative	Charles Wesley Hambly	3,031	55.33	+6.55
Liberal	Carleton Woods	2,447	44.67	–6.55
Total valid votes		5,478	100.00	
Total rejected ballots		–		
Turnout		5,478	–	–
Eligible voters				
Conservative gain from Liberal		Swing		+6.55
Source: Elections Ontario

1923 Ontario general election
Party	Candidate	Votes	%	±%
Liberal	John Perry Vrooman	2,767	51.22	+16.64
Conservative	Charles Wesley Hambly	2,635	48.78	+8.80
Total valid votes		5,402	99.16	
Total rejected ballots		46	0.84	–2.35
Turnout		5,448	69.44	–8.06
Eligible voters		7,846		
Liberal gain from Conservative		Swing		+3.92
Source: Elections Ontario

1919 Ontario general election
Party	Candidate	Votes	%	±%
Conservative	Reginald Amherst Fowler	2,329	39.98	–
Liberal	Carleton Woods	2,015	34.59	–
United Farmers	Claude B. Brether	1,482	25.44	–
Total valid votes		5,826	96.81	
Total rejected ballots		192	3.19	–
Turnout		6,018	77.50	–
Eligible voters		7,765		
Conservative hold		Swing		–
Source: Elections Ontario

Ontario provincial by-election, August 29, 1918 Death of Thomas George Carscallen
Party	Candidate	Votes	%	±%
Conservative	Reginald Amherst Fowler	acclaimed		
Source: Elections Ontario

1914 Ontario general election
Party	Candidate	Votes	%	±%
Conservative	Thomas George Carscallen	1,485	53.59	+2.19
Liberal	Marshall Seymour Madole	1,286	46.41	–2.19
Total valid votes		2,771	99.32	
Total rejected ballots		19	0.68	–0.13
Turnout		2,790	93.28	+16.62
Eligible voters		2,991		
Conservative hold		Swing		+2.19
Source: Elections Ontario

1911 Ontario general election
Party	Candidate	Votes	%	±%
Conservative	Thomas George Carscallen	1,450	51.40	+1.11
Liberal	Marshall Seymour Madole	1,371	48.60	–1.11
Total valid votes		2,821	99.19	
Total rejected ballots		23	0.81	+0.33
Turnout		2,844	76.66	–12.74
Eligible voters		3,710		
Conservative hold		Swing		+1.11
Source: Elections Ontario

1908 Ontario general election
Party	Candidate	Votes	%	±%
Conservative	Thomas George Carscallen	1,477	50.29	–0.80
Liberal	Marshall Seymour Madole	1,460	49.71	+0.80
Total valid votes		2,937	99.53	
Total rejected ballots		14	0.47	+0.09
Turnout		2,951	89.40	+7.44
Eligible voters		3,301		
Conservative hold		Swing		–0.80
Source: Elections Ontario

1905 Ontario general election
Party	Candidate	Votes	%	±%
Conservative	Thomas George Carscallen	1,597	51.09	+1.04
Liberal	Marshall Seymour Madole	1,529	48.91	–1.04
Total valid votes		3,126	99.62	
Total rejected ballots		12	0.38	–0.38
Turnout		3,138	81.95	+4.06
Eligible voters		3,829		
Conservative hold		Swing		+1.04
Source: Elections Ontario

1902 Ontario general election
Party	Candidate	Votes	%	±%
Conservative	Thomas George Carscallen	1,566	50.05	+1.69
Liberal	Marshall Seymour Madole	1,563	49.95	–1.69
Total valid votes		3,129	99.24	
Total rejected ballots		24	0.76	+0.76
Turnout		3,153	77.89	–
Eligible voters		4,048		
Conservative gain from Liberal		Swing		+1.69
Source: Elections Ontario

Ontario provincial by-election, November 18, 1898 Void election
Party	Candidate	Votes	%	±%
Liberal	Bowen Ebenezer Aylsworth	1,698	51.64	+0.99
Conservative	Walter William Meacham	1,590	48.36	–0.99
Total valid votes		3,288	100.00	
Total rejected ballots		–		
Turnout		3,288	–	–
Eligible voters				
Liberal hold		Swing		+0.99
Source: Elections Ontario

1898 Ontario general election
Party	Candidate	Votes	%	±%
Liberal	Bowen Ebenezer Aylsworth	1,677	50.65	+15.58
Conservative	Walter William Meacham	1,634	49.35	+10.26
Total valid votes		3,311	99.79	
Total rejected ballots		7	0.21	–0.04
Turnout		3,318	78.74	+11.50
Eligible voters		4,214		
Liberal gain from Conservative		Swing		+2.66
Source: Elections Ontario

1894 Ontario general election
Party	Candidate	Votes	%	±%
Conservative	Walter William Meacham	1,089	39.09	–11.30
Liberal	Thomas Symington	977	35.07	–14.55
Patrons of Industry	R. M. Briscoe	720	25.84	–
Total valid votes		2,786	99.75	
Total rejected ballots		7	0.25	–0.48
Turnout		2,793	67.24	–3.31
Eligible voters		4,154		
Conservative hold		Swing		+1.63
Source: Elections Ontario

1890 Ontario general election
Party	Candidate	Votes	%	±%
Conservative	Walter William Meacham	1,441	50.38	–1.25
Liberal	Bowen Ebenezer Aylsworth	1,419	49.62	+1.25
Total valid votes		2,860	99.27	
Total rejected ballots		21	0.73	+0.67
Turnout		2,881	70.54	–4.35
Eligible voters		4,084		
Conservative hold		Swing		–1.25
Source: Elections Ontario

1886 Ontario general election
Party	Candidate	Votes	%	±%
Conservative	Walter William Meacham	1,627	51.63	+1.87
Liberal	George Douglas Hawley	1,524	48.37	–1.87
Total valid votes		3,151	99.94	
Total rejected ballots		2	0.06	+0.06
Turnout		3,153	74.89	–
Eligible voters		4,210		
Conservative gain from Liberal		Swing		+1.87
Source: Elections Ontario

Ontario provincial by-election, June 26, 1885 Void election
Party	Candidate	Votes	%	±%
Liberal	George Douglas Hawley	1,406	50.23	–0.51
Conservative	George Tate Blackstock	1,393	49.77	+0.51
Total valid votes		2,799	100.00	
Total rejected ballots		–		
Turnout		2,799	–	–
Eligible voters				
Liberal hold		Swing		–0.51
Source: Elections Ontario

Ontario provincial by-election, August 28, 1884 Death of Alexander Hall Roe
Party	Candidate	Votes	%	±%
Liberal	George Douglas Hawley	1,444	50.74	+3.79
Conservative	George Tate Blackstock	1,402	49.26	–3.79
Total valid votes		2,846	100.00	
Total rejected ballots		–		
Turnout		2,846	–	–
Eligible voters				
Liberal gain from Conservative		Swing		+3.79
Source: Elections Ontario

1883 Ontario general election
Party	Candidate	Votes	%	±%
Conservative	Alexander Hall Roe	1,502	53.06	+3.26
Liberal	George Douglas Hawley	1,329	46.94	–3.26
Total valid votes		2,831	98.78	
Total rejected ballots		35	1.22	+1.22
Turnout		2,866	73.09	+10.38
Eligible voters		3,921		
Conservative gain from Liberal		Swing		+3.26
Source: Elections Ontario

1879 Ontario general election
Party	Candidate	Votes	%	±%
Liberal	George Douglas Hawley	1,231	50.20	+24.17
Conservative	Mr. Ker	1,221	49.80	
Total valid votes		2,452	62.71	+9.24
Eligible voters		3,910		
Liberal gain from Independent Conservative		Swing		+24.17
Source: Elections Ontario

1875 Ontario general election
Party	Candidate	Votes	%	±%
Independent Conservative	John Thomas Grange	1,065	54.36	−2.05
Liberal	T.W. Casey	510	26.03	
Independent	P.D. Booth	384	19.60	
Turnout		1,959	53.47	−9.49
Eligible voters		3,664		
Independent Conservative hold		Swing		−2.05
Source: Elections Ontario

1871 Ontario general election
Party	Candidate	Votes	%	±%
Conservative	John Thomas Grange	1,183	56.41	+3.12
Conservative	John Stevenson	914	43.59	−9.71
Turnout		2,097	62.95	−3.40
Eligible voters		3,331		
Conservative hold		Swing		+6.41
Source: Elections Ontario

1867 Ontario general election
Party	Candidate	Votes	%
Conservative	John Stevenson	1,222	53.29
Liberal	T.W. Casey	826	36.02
Independent	B.C. Davy	245	10.68
Total valid votes		2,293	66.35
Eligible voters		3,456	
Conservative pickup new district.			
Source: Elections Ontario
