= James Regan (politician) =

Canadian politician

Ontario MPP
- In office 1911–1919
- Preceded by: Daniel Reed
- Succeeded by: Wilson A. Crockett
- Constituency: Wentworth South

Personal details
- Born: June 29, 1855 Mimosa
- Died: July 1, 1927 (aged 72)
- Party: Conservative
- Spouse(s): Alferetta Templer (m. 1884); Kate Alma Gabel (m. 1898)
- Occupation: Farmer

James Thomas Hammill Regan (June 29, 1855 – 1927) was a farmer, merchant and political figure in Ontario. He represented Wentworth South in the Legislative Assembly of Ontario from 1911 to 1919 as a Conservative member.

He was born in Chatham, the son of James Regan and Sarah Hammill, and was educated in Ancaster and Dundas. Regan was married twice: first to Alferetta Templer in 1884 and then to Kate Alma Gabel in 1898. He ran unsuccessfully for a seat in the assembly in 1905 and 1908. Regan later served as sheriff for Wentworth County.
