= William Sexton (politician) =

Canadian politician

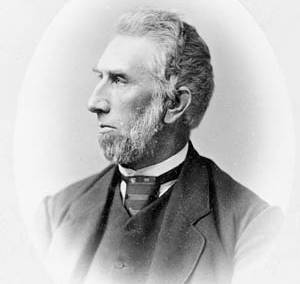

Ontario MPP
- In office 1867–1879
- Preceded by: Riding established
- Succeeded by: Nicholas Awrey
- Constituency: Wentworth South

Personal details
- Born: January 3, 1819 Schenectady, New York
- Died: May 20, 1895 (aged 76) Hamilton, Ontario
- Party: Liberal
- Spouse: Eleanor Wilkins (m. 1840)
- Occupation: Farmer

William Sexton (January 3, 1819 – May 20, 1895) was an Ontario farmer, auctioneer and political figure. He represented Wentworth South in the Legislative Assembly of Ontario as a Liberal member from 1867 to 1879.

He was born in Schenectady, New York in 1819 and came to Ancaster Township in Upper Canada in 1832 with his parents. In 1840, Sexton married Eleanor Wilkins. He served on the township council and was reeve in 1859. In 1890, he moved to Hamilton, Ontario. He served as a commissioner in the Court of Queen's Bench for Wentworth County.

== Electoral history ==
1867 Ontario general election: Wentworth South
Party	Candidate	Votes	%
Liberal	William Sexton	1,002	50.07
Conservative	T. White	999	49.93
Total valid votes		2,001	83.24
Eligible voters		2,404	
Liberal pickup new district.			
Source: Elections Ontario

1871 Ontario general election: Wentworth South
Party	Candidate	Votes	%	±%
Liberal	William Sexton	957	66.97	+16.89
Conservative	J.V.W. Spohn	472	33.03	−16.89
Turnout		1,429	56.08	−27.16
Eligible voters		2,548		
Liberal hold		Swing		+16.89
Source: Elections Ontario

1875 Ontario general election: Wentworth South
Party	Candidate	Votes	%	±%
Liberal	William Sexton	944	71.14	+4.17
Conservative	J.V.W. Spohn	383	28.86	−4.17
Total valid votes		1,327	44.70	−11.39
Eligible voters		2,969		
Liberal hold		Swing		+4.17
Source: Elections Ontario
