= George Douglas Hawley =

Canadian politician (1841–1934)

Ontario MPP
- In office 1885–1886
- Preceded by: Alexander Hall Roe
- Succeeded by: Walter William Meacham
- In office 1879–1883
- Preceded by: John Thomas Grange
- Succeeded by: Alexander Hall Roe
- Constituency: Lennox

Personal details
- Born: April 3, 1841 Fredericksburg Township, Lennox County, Canada West
- Died: September 22, 1934 (aged 93)
- Party: Liberal
- Spouse: Sarah Caroline Bristol
- Occupation: Businessman

George Douglas Hawley (April 3, 1841 – September 22, 1934) was an Ontario politician. He represented Lennox in the Legislative Assembly of Ontario from 1879 to 1883 and in 1886 as a Liberal member.

He was born in Fredericksburg Township, Lennox County, Canada West in 1841, the son of Joseph Case Hawley, and educated in Kingston. Hawley married Sarah Caroline Bristol, the daughter of doctor Amos Samuel Bristol. He defeated Alexander Hall Roe in the 1879 election, lost to Roe in 1883 and then was elected to the same seat in an 1886 by-election held after Roe's death. He was defeated in the general election that followed later that year. In 1887, Hawley was named clerk for the division court at Napanee; in 1895, he was named sheriff for Lennox and Addington Counties.

== Electoral history ==
1879 Ontario general election: Lennox
Party	Candidate	Votes	%	±%
Liberal	George Douglas Hawley	1,231	50.20	+24.17
Conservative	Mr. Ker	1,221	49.80	
Total valid votes		2,452	62.71	+9.24
Eligible voters		3,910		
Liberal gain from Independent Conservative		Swing		+24.17
Source: Elections Ontario
