= John Stevenson (Ontario politician) =

Canadian politician

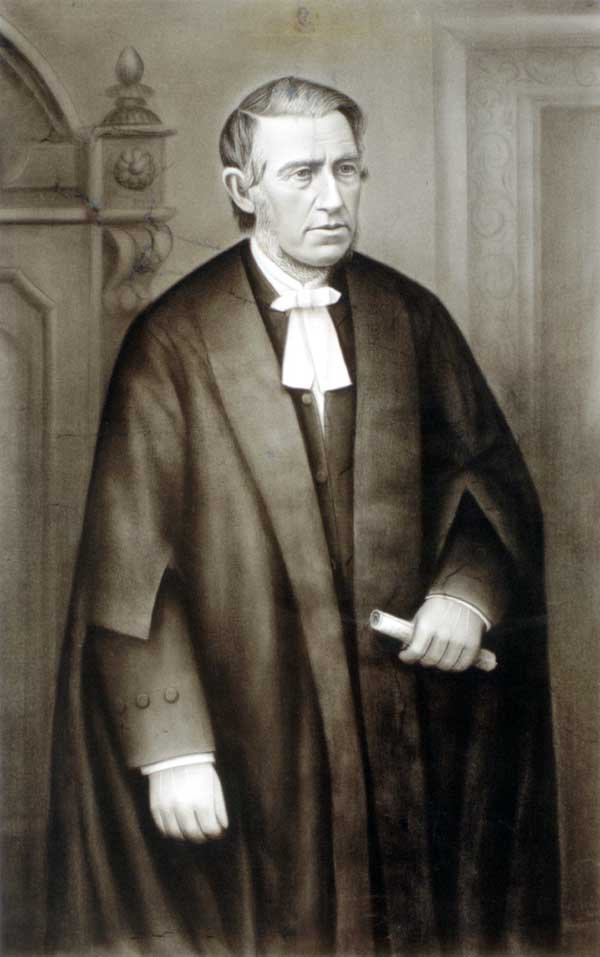

Ontario MPP
- In office 1867–1871
- Preceded by: Riding established
- Succeeded by: John Thomas Grange
- Constituency: Lennox

1st Speaker of the Legislative Assembly of Ontario
- In office 1867–1871
- Succeeded by: Richard William Scott

Personal details
- Born: August 12, 1812 Hunterdon County, New Jersey
- Died: April 1, 1884 (aged 71) Napanee, Ontario
- Party: Conservative
- Spouse: Phoebe Eliza Hall (m. 1842)
- Occupation: Merchant

John Stevenson (August 12, 1812 – April 1, 1884) was the first Speaker of the Legislative Assembly of Ontario from 1867 to 1871 and served as Conservative MPP for Lennox from 1867 to 1871.

Born in Hunterdon County, New Jersey, Stevenson's family moved to New York State (likely to the Albany, New York area and finally to Upper Canada. He was educated in Brockville and taught school briefly. Stevenson worked in various trades before entering politics:

- flour mill operator
- foundry owner
- axe shopkeeper
- brush factory owner
- lumberman
- shipping company owner

In 1842, he married Phoebe Eliza Hall.

Stevenson also served as a justice of the peace and as reeve for Napanee. From 1863 to 1865, he was warden for Lennox and Addington County.

After his defeat in 1871 by John Thomas Grange, he ran for the Lennox seat in the Canadian House of Commons in 1872 as an independent, losing to Richard John Cartwright, formerly a Conservative, now a Liberal. In 1878, he campaigned on behalf of Cartwright. Stevenson died in Napanee, Ontario in 1884.

== Electoral history ==
1867 Ontario general election: Lennox
Party	Candidate	Votes	%
Conservative	John Stevenson	1,222	53.29
Liberal	T.W. Casey	826	36.02
Independent	B.C. Davy	245	10.68
Total valid votes		2,293	66.35
Eligible voters		3,456	
Conservative pickup new district.			
Source: Elections Ontario

1871 Ontario general election: Lennox
Party	Candidate	Votes	%	±%
Conservative	John Thomas Grange	1,183	56.41	+3.12
Conservative	John Stevenson	914	43.59	−9.71
Turnout		2,097	62.95	−3.40
Eligible voters		3,331		
Conservative hold		Swing		+6.41
Source: Elections Ontario
