= Alexander Hall Roe =

Canadian politician

George Douglas Hawley

Ontario MPP
- In office 1883–1884
- Preceded by: George Douglas Hawley
- Succeeded by: George Douglas Hawley
- Constituency: Lennox

Personal details
- Born: September 15, 1842 Westport, Frontenac County
- Died: July 12, 1884 (aged 41) Toronto, Ontario
- Party: Liberal
- Occupation: Merchant

Alexander Hall Roe (1842 – July 12, 1884) was an Ontario merchant and political figure. He represented Lennox in the Legislative Assembly of Ontario as a Conservative member from 1883 to 1884.

He was born in Westport, Frontenac County in 1842 and studied at Victoria College in Cobourg. He studied law in Napanee but then moved to Forest Mills where he operated a general store, a sawmill and a gristmill. He returned to the study of law at Napanee and, although he never qualified as an attorney, was employed in the practice of general law. He was defeated by George Douglas Hawley in the 1879 general election but then won the Lennox seat in 1883. He died in office in 1884.
