= Northumberland East (provincial electoral district) =

Ontario electoral district

Defunct provincial electoral district
- Legislature: Legislative Assembly of Ontario
- District created: 1867
- District abolished: 1925
- First contested: 1867
- Last contested: 1923

Northumberland East was an electoral riding in Ontario, Canada. It was created in 1867 at the time of confederation and was abolished in 1925 before the 1926 election. It was merged with Northumberland West to form Northumberland.

== Members of Provincial Parliament ==
Northumberland East
Assembly	Years	Member	Party
1st	1867–1871	John Eyre	Liberal
2nd	1871–1874	William Wilson Webb	Liberal
3rd	1875–1879	James Marshall Ferris	Liberal
4th	1879–1883	James Marshall Ferris	Liberal
5th	1883–1886	James Marshall Ferris	Liberal
6th	1886–1887	William Arnson Willoughby	Conservative
6th	1888–1888	Richard Clarke	Liberal
6th	1888–1890	William Arnson Willoughby	Conservative
7th	1890–1894	William Arnson Willoughby	Conservative
8th	1894–1898	William Arnson Willoughby	Conservative
9th	1898–1902	John Henry Douglas	Liberal
10th	1902–1904	William Arnson Willoughby	Conservative
11th	1905–1908	William Arnson Willoughby	Conservative
12th	1908–1911	Samuel Greerson Nesbitt	Conservative
13th	1911–1914	Samuel Greerson Nesbitt	Conservative
14th	1914–1919	Samuel Greerson Nesbitt	Conservative
15th	1919–1923	Wesley Montgomery	United Farmers
16th	1923–1926	James Belford	Conservative
Sourced from the Ontario Legislative Assembly
Merged into Northumberland before the 1926 election

== Election results ==
1923 Ontario general election
Party	Candidate	Votes	%	±%
Conservative	James Belford	4,434	52.09	+2.58
United Farmers	Wesley Montgomery	4,078	47.91	–2.58
Total valid votes		8,512	98.92	
Total rejected ballots		93	1.08	–2.15
Turnout		8,605	71.02	–
Eligible voters		12,116		
Conservative gain from United Farmers		Swing		+2.58
Source: Elections Ontario

1919 Ontario general election
Party	Candidate	Votes	%	±%
United Farmers	Wesley Montgomery	4,521	50.49	–
Conservative	Alexander Hume	4,434	49.51	–7.99
Total valid votes		8,955	96.77	
Total rejected ballots		299	3.23	+2.74
Turnout		9,254	–	–
Eligible voters				
United Farmers gain from Conservative		Swing		–
Source: Elections Ontario

1914 Ontario general election
Party	Candidate	Votes	%	±%
Conservative	Samuel Greerson Nesbitt	2,426	57.50	–6.71
Liberal	George Carlaw	1,793	42.50	+6.71
Total valid votes		4,219	99.50	
Total rejected ballots		21	0.50	–0.14
Turnout		4,240	79.86	+18.07
Eligible voters		5,309		
Conservative hold		Swing		–6.71
Source: Elections Ontario

1911 Ontario general election
Party	Candidate	Votes	%	±%
Conservative	Samuel Greerson Nesbitt	2,311	64.21	+7.91
Liberal	Thomas James Atkinson	1,288	35.79	–7.91
Total valid votes		3,599	99.37	
Total rejected ballots		23	0.64	+0.09
Turnout		3,622	61.80	–20.32
Eligible voters		5,861		
Conservative hold		Swing		+7.91
Source: Elections Ontario

1908 Ontario general election
Party	Candidate	Votes	%	±%
Conservative	Samuel Greerson Nesbitt	2,582	56.30	–3.17
Liberal	Lewis Frederick Clarry	2,004	43.70	+3.17
Total valid votes		4,586	99.46	
Total rejected ballots		25	0.54	+0.09
Turnout		4,611	82.12	+6.74
Eligible voters		5,615		
Conservative hold		Swing		–3.17
Source: Elections Ontario

1905 Ontario general election
Party	Candidate	Votes	%	±%
Conservative	William Arnson Willoughby	2,644	59.47	+6.52
Liberal	George Cryderman	1,802	40.53	–6.52
Total valid votes		4,446	99.55	
Total rejected ballots		20	0.45	–0.79
Turnout		4,466	75.38	–2.65
Eligible voters		5,925		
Conservative hold		Swing		+6.52
Source: Elections Ontario

1902 Ontario general election
Party	Candidate	Votes	%	±%
Conservative	William Arnson Willoughby	2,538	52.95	+8.82
Liberal	A. O. Simmons	2,255	47.05	–8.82
Total valid votes		4,793	98.76	
Total rejected ballots		60	1.24	+1.24
Turnout		4,853	78.02	–
Eligible voters		6,220		
Conservative gain from Liberal		Swing		+8.82
Source: Elections Ontario

Ontario provincial by-election, December 14, 1898 Void election
Party	Candidate	Votes	%	±%
Liberal	John Henry Douglas	2,732	55.87	+1.92
Conservative	William Arnson Willoughby	2,158	44.13	–1.92
Total valid votes		4,890	100.00	
Total rejected ballots		–		
Turnout		4,890	–	–
Eligible voters				
Liberal hold		Swing		+1.92
Source: Elections Ontario

1898 Ontario general election
Party	Candidate	Votes	%	±%
Liberal	John Henry Douglas	2,814	53.95	+19.27
Conservative	William Arnson Willoughby	2,402	46.05	–19.27
Total valid votes		5,216	99.16	
Total rejected ballots		44	0.84	–0.89
Turnout		5,260	83.44	+9.09
Eligible voters		6,304		
Liberal gain from Conservative		Swing		+19.27
Source: Elections Ontario

1894 Ontario general election
Party	Candidate	Votes	%	±%
Conservative	William Arnson Willoughby	1,701	38.76	–14.60
Liberal	Frank Leslie Webb	1,522	34.68	–11.96
Conservative	J. B. Ewing	1,166	26.57	–26.79
Total valid votes		4,389	98.28	
Total rejected ballots		77	1.72	+1.24
Turnout		4,466	74.35	–9.39
Eligible voters		6,007		
Conservative hold		Swing		–1.32
Source: Elections Ontario

1890 Ontario general election
Party	Candidate	Votes	%	±%
Conservative	William Arnson Willoughby	2,185	53.36	+3.26
Liberal	H. F. Young	1,910	46.64	–3.26
Total valid votes		4,095	99.51	
Total rejected ballots		20	0.49	+0.49
Turnout		4,115	83.74	–
Eligible voters		4,914		
Conservative hold		Swing		+3.26
Source: Elections Ontario

Ontario provincial by-election, October 11, 1888 Death of Richard Clarke
Party	Candidate	Votes	%	±%
Conservative	William Arnson Willoughby	1,878	50.09	+1.17
Liberal	C.A. Mallory	1,871	49.91	–1.17
Total valid votes		3,749	100.00	
Total rejected ballots		–		
Turnout		3,749	–	–
Eligible voters				
Conservative gain from Liberal		Swing		+1.17
Source: Elections Ontario

Ontario provincial by-election, February 1, 1888 Void Election
Party	Candidate	Votes	%	±%
Liberal	Richard Clarke	2,231	51.08	+1.66
Conservative	William Arnson Willoughby	2,137	48.92	–1.66
Total valid votes		4,368	100.00	
Total rejected ballots		–		
Turnout		4,368	–	–
Eligible voters				
Liberal gain from Conservative		Swing		+1.66
Source: Elections Ontario

1886 Ontario general election
Party	Candidate	Votes	%	±%
Conservative	William Arnson Willoughby	2,204	50.59	+1.49
Liberal	James Marshall Ferris	2,153	49.41	–1.49
Total valid votes		4,357	98.60	
Total rejected ballots		62	1.40	+0.58
Turnout		4,419	72.55	–4.82
Eligible voters		6,091		
Conservative gain from Liberal		Swing		+1.49
Source: Elections Ontario

1883 Ontario general election
Party	Candidate	Votes	%	±%
Liberal	James Marshall Ferris	2,156	50.91	+0.26
Conservative	Mr. Wade	2,079	49.09	–0.26
Total valid votes		4,235	99.18	
Total rejected ballots		35	0.82	+0.82
Turnout		4,270	77.37	+6.04
Eligible voters		5,519		
Liberal hold		Swing		+0.26
Source: Elections Ontario

1879 Ontario general election
Party	Candidate	Votes	%	±%
Liberal	James Marshall Ferris	1,887	50.64	−1.81
Conservative	E. Cochrane	1,839	49.36	+1.81
Total valid votes		3,726	71.32	
Eligible voters		5,224		
Liberal hold		Swing		−1.81
Source: Elections Ontario

Ontario provincial by-election, November 1875 Previous election voided
Party	Candidate	Votes	%	±%
Liberal	James Marshall Ferris	1,709	52.46	+14.76
Conservative	E. Cochrane	1,549	47.54	+11.48
Total valid votes		3,258		
Liberal hold		Swing		+1.64
Source: History of the Electoral Districts, Legislatures and Ministries of the Province of Ontario

1875 Ontario general election
Party	Candidate	Votes	%	±%
Liberal	James Marshall Ferris	1,551	48.27	+10.58
Conservative	E. Cochrane	1,448	45.07	+9.00
Liberal	William Wilson Webb	214	6.66	−31.04
Total valid votes		3,213	74.62	+21.39
Eligible voters		4,306		
Election voided
Source: Elections Ontario

1871 Ontario general election
Party	Candidate	Votes	%	±%
Liberal	William Wilson Webb	694	37.70	−26.86
Conservative	John Eyre	664	36.07	+0.71
Independent	Mr. Meyers	483	26.24	
Turnout		1,841	53.22	−13.75
Eligible voters		3,459		
Liberal hold		Swing		−13.79
Source: Elections Ontario

1867 Ontario general election
Party	Candidate	Votes	%
Liberal	John Eyre	1,492	64.56
Conservative	G.S. Burrell	817	35.35
Independent	Mr. Cummings	1	0.04
Independent	Mr. Humphries	1	0.04
Total valid votes		2,311	66.97
Eligible voters		3,451	
Liberal pickup new district.			
Source: Elections Ontario
