= John Eyre (Canadian politician) =

Canadian politician

Ontario MPP
- In office 1867–1871
- Preceded by: Riding established
- Succeeded by: William Wilson Webb
- Constituency: Northumberland East

Personal details
- Born: June 1824 Launceston, Cornwall, United Kingdom
- Died: May 13, 1882 (aged 57)
- Party: Liberal
- Spouse: Calista Stevens (m. 1853)
- Occupation: Lawyer

John Eyre (June 1824 – May 13, 1882) was an Ontario lawyer and political figure. He represented Northumberland East in the Legislative Assembly of Ontario as a Liberal from 1867 to 1871.

He was born in Launceston, Cornwall, United Kingdom in 1824 and came to Cobourg with his family in 1832. He was admitted to practice as an attorney in 1851. He settled at Brighton in 1853 and married Calista Stevens, granddaughter of bishop John Reynolds, in 1856. Eyre was defeated in the 1871 election for the same seat by William Wilson Webb. He was one of the original shareholders of the Brighton Wharf Company.

Eyre's former residence in Brighton is known as the White House. King Edward VII was a guest there.

== Electoral history ==
1867 Ontario general election: Northumberland East
Party	Candidate	Votes	%
Liberal	John Eyre	1,492	64.56
Conservative	G.S. Burrell	817	35.35
Independent	Mr. Cummings	1	0.04
Independent	Mr. Humphries	1	0.04
Total valid votes		2,311	66.97
Eligible voters		3,451	
Liberal pickup new district.			
Source: Elections Ontario

1871 Ontario general election: Northumberland East
Party	Candidate	Votes	%	±%
Liberal	William Wilson Webb	694	37.70	−26.86
Conservative	John Eyre	664	36.07	+0.71
Independent	Mr. Meyers	483	26.24	
Turnout		1,841	53.22	−13.75
Eligible voters		3,459		
Liberal hold		Swing		−13.79
Source: Elections Ontario
