= John Dickenson (Canadian politician) =

Canadian politician

- Family portrait of the Dickenson family, with John is on the left (1896)

Ontario MPP
- In office 1898–1904
- Preceded by: Nicholas Awrey
- Succeeded by: Daniel Reed
- Constituency: Wentworth South

Personal details
- Born: August 3, 1847; Hayden Bridge-on-Tyne, Northumberland, England
- Died: January 3, 1932 (aged 84); Hamilton, Ontario, Canada
- Political party: Liberal
- Spouse: Angela Young (m. 1871)
- Occupation: Contractor

John Urwin Dickenson (August 3, 1847 – January 3, 1932) was a Hamilton, Ontario contractor and political figure. He represented Wentworth South in the Legislative Assembly of Ontario from 1896 to 1904 as a Liberal member.

Dickenson was born at Hayden Bridge-on-Tyne, Northumberland, England, the son of Edward Dickenson. He went to Glanford Township, Canada West with his family in 1855, and learned the trades of bricklaying and masonry from his father. In 1871, he married Angela Young. He was president of the Kramer Irwin Paving Company. He was also involved in the construction of a number of buildings throughout the province. Dickenson was a member of the township council for Glanford, serving as reeve in 1887, and was warden for Wentworth County in 1891. He was secretary-treasurer for the South Wentworth Agricultural Society and served ten years as superintendent of the Great Central Fair in Hamilton. He was elected to the provincial assembly in an 1896 by-election held after Nicholas Awrey resigned his seat. He was also one of the five Johns of the Dominion Power and Transmission Company John Morison Gibson was another. They owned the Hamilton Street Rail-way; they later sold out to hydro about 1930. John Dickenson, his brother Edward and his father, Edward Senior, built all the schools in Glanford, except No. 5, also the schools in Binbrook, Ancaster, Seneca, Oneida and West Flamborough. His Brickyard was in Glanford at the north east corner of Twenty and No. 6 Highway. John was also on the board of directors of the Bank of Hamilton.
