= Edward Ming =

Canadian politician

Ontario MPP
- In office 1926–1929
- Preceded by: New riding
- Succeeded by: Charles Wesley Hambly
- Constituency: Frontenac—Lennox

Personal details
- Born: December 15, 1857 Hastings County, Canada West
- Died: May 9, 1936 (aged 78) Ottawa, Ontario
- Party: Liberal
- Spouse: Emma Katherine Duckworth
- Occupation: Veterinary surgeon

Edward Ming (December 15, 1857 – May 9, 1936) was a veterinary surgeon and political figure in Ontario. He represented Frontenac—Lennox in the Legislative Assembly of Ontario from 1926 to 1929 as a Liberal member.

He was born in Hastings County, Canada West and, after receiving his degree as veterinary surgeon in 1885, set up practice in Napanee. He was married to Emma Katherine Duckworth and had 2 children. Ming served on the school board and town council for Napanee, serving two years as mayor from 1925 to 1926. He died at the Ottawa Civic Hospital at the age of 78.
