= John Perry Vrooman =

Canadian politician

Ontario MPP
- In office 1923 (June - August)
- Preceded by: Reginald Amherst Fowler
- Succeeded by: Charles Wesley Hambly
- Constituency: Frontenac—Lennox

Personal details
- Born: February 25, 1860 Centreville, Lennox and Addington County, Canada West
- Died: August 23, 1923 (aged 63) Kingston, Ontario
- Party: Liberal
- Spouse: Rose Elizabeth Catherall (m. 1896)
- Occupation: Physician

John Perry Vrooman (February 25, 1860 – August 20, 1923) was an Ontario physician and political figure. He represented Lennox in the Legislative Assembly of Ontario as a Liberal member in 1923.

He was born in Centreville, Lennox and Addington County, Canada West, the son of William H. Vrooman. He practiced in Yarker for 8 years, then moved to Napanee in 1896. He married Rose Elizabeth Catherall. Vrooman was mayor of Napanee in 1903. He was an unsuccessful candidate for a seat in the House of Commons in 1911. In June 1923 provincial election, he was elected in the riding of Lennox. He died in two month later in August and did not get a chance to serve in the provincial house. He was buried in Napanee.
