= Samuel Greerson Nesbitt =

Canadian politician

Ontario MPP
- In office 1908–1919
- Preceded by: William Arnson Willoughby
- Succeeded by: Wesley Montgomery
- Constituency: Northumberland East

Personal details
- Born: November 23, 1859 Brighton, Canada West
- Died: February 23, 1938 (aged 78) Brighton, Ontario
- Party: Conservative
- Spouse: Eleanor M. Bibby (m. 1884)
- Occupation: Apple exporter

Samuel Greerson Murray Nesbitt (November 23, 1859 – February 23, 1938) was an apple exporter and political figure in Ontario. He represented Northumberland East in the Legislative Assembly of Ontario from 1908 to 1919 as a Conservative member.

He was born in Brighton, the son of James Nesbitt, a native of Ireland, and was educated in Brighton. In 1884, he married Eleanor M. Bibby. Nesbitt was president of the Canadian Canning Company. He served eight years as reeve of Brighton. In 1915, Nesbitt donated land and funds towards the construction of the Brighton Public School. He died in Brighton in 1938 and was buried at Mount Hope Cemetery.
