= Daniel Fowler =

English-born Canadian watercolour painter (1810 – 1894)

- Born: February 10, 1810; Downe, Kent, Great Britain
- Died: September 14, 1894 (aged 84); Amherst Island, near Kingston
- Education: with the British watercolour artist James Duffield Harding and with Harding`s engraver-collaborator, Hullmandel
- Spouse: Elizabeth Gale
- Awards: charter member, Royal Canadian Academy; founding member Ontario Society of Artists; medal, Centennial Exposition in Philadelphia, the first international prize awarded to a Canadian

Daniel Fowler RCA (February 10, 1810 – September 14, 1894) was an English-born Canadian artist, writer and farmer. He is still considered one of Canada's finest artists working in watercolour.

== Biography ==
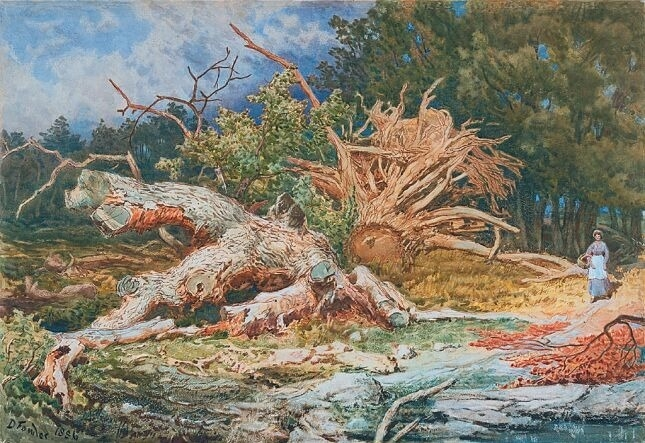
Fallen Birch (1886), watercolour on wove paper

The son of Daniel Fowler and Mary Ann Pope, he was born in Camberwell and grew up in the village of Downe. He was educated at schools in Camberwell and Walthamstow. He articled in law at the Doctors' Commons but abandoned law for art following his father's death in 1829. From 1831 to 1833, he studied with James Duffield Harding. By 1832, he was giving lessons in drawing. During a tour of the Alps in 1834-35, he contracted smallpox and convalesced in Rome. He returned to London, resuming teaching and painting; Fowler exhibited his work at the Society of British Artists and the Royal Academy of Arts.

For the sake of his health, in 1843, he emigrated to Upper Canada with his family, settling on a farm on Amherst Island, near Kingston. He abandoned painting for 14 years to learn farming and work on improvements to his house. In 1857, he travelled to England to visit his mother. In London, he attended exhibitions at the Royal Academy and visited old acquaintances, and saw the rise of the Pre-Raphaelite Brotherhood whose ideal of being truthful to nature appealed to him. On his return to Canada, he began to paint again. He won several prizes at the Upper Canada Provincial Exhibition in 1863; he continued to show his work there until 1868. Fowler also exhibited with the Art Association of Montreal, the Society of Canadian Artists, the American Society of Painters in Water Colors and the Ontario Society of Artists. In 1876, he received a medal at the Centennial Exposition in Philadelphia, the first international prize awarded to a Canadian. In 1880, he became a charter member of the Royal Canadian Academy of Arts.

Fowler also contributed articles to various periodicals including The Week, Chambers’s Journal, All the Year Round and the Canadian Monthly and National Review. He also wrote an autobiography which remained unpublished at his death. In 1979, it was published as Daniel Fowler of Amherst Island, 1810–1894.

In 1835, he married Elizabeth Gale. The couple had three daughters and two sons. His son Reginald served in the Ontario assembly.

He died at home on Amherst Island at the age of 84.

His art is included in the collections of the Agnes Etherington Art Centre, the Art Gallery of Hamilton, the National Gallery of Canada, the Art Gallery of Ontario and the Royal Ontario Museum.

A historical plaque was erected by the Ontario Heritage Trust on the site of Fowler's home on Amherst Island.

== Bibliography ==
- Bradfield, Helen (1970). Art Gallery of Ontario: the Canadian Collection Collection. Toronto: McGraw Hill. ISBN 0070925046. Archived from the original on June 7, 2020.
