= Daniel Reed (Canadian politician) =

Canadian politician

Ontario MPP
- In office 1905–1911
- Preceded by: John Dickenson
- Succeeded by: James Regan
- Constituency: Wentworth South

Personal details
- Born: July 15, 1858 Mimosa, Canada West
- Died: July 1, 1935 (aged 76)
- Party: Liberal
- Spouse: Mary J. Dickenson (m. 1886)
- Occupation: Farmer

Daniel Reed (July 15, 1858 – 1935) was a farmer and politician in Ontario, Canada. He represented Wentworth South in the Legislative Assembly of Ontario from 1905 to 1911 as a Liberal.

The son of Henry Reed and Janet McDougal, he was born in Mimosa and was educated in Brantford. In 1886, he married Mary J. Dickenson. Reed served on the township council, also serving as reeve, and served on the county council.
