= James Marshall Ferris =

Canadian politician

Ontario MPP
- In office 1875–1886
- Preceded by: William Wilson Webb
- Succeeded by: William Arnson Willoughby
- Constituency: Northumberland East

Personal details
- Born: 1828 County Fermanagh, Ireland
- Died: March 2, 1893 (aged 64) Campbellford, Ontario
- Party: Liberal
- Spouse: Catherine Fralick (m. 1857)
- Children: none
- Occupation: Postmaster

James Marshall Ferris (1828 – March 2, 1893) was an Ontario politician. He represented Northumberland East in the Legislative Assembly of Ontario as a Liberal member from 1875 to 1886.

He was born in County Fermanagh, Ireland in 1828 and came to Canada West in 1850. In 1857, he married Catherine Fralick. Ferris served as postmaster of Campbellford, Ontario, reeve of Seymour Township and warden of the United Counties of Northumberland and Durham.

Ferris acquired large amounts of property in the Campbellford area and his descendants donated the land which later became Ferris Provincial Park.

== Electoral history ==
1875 Ontario general election: Northumberland East
Party	Candidate	Votes	%	±%
Liberal	James Marshall Ferris	1,551	48.27	+10.58
Conservative	E. Cochrane	1,448	45.07	+9.00
Liberal	William Wilson Webb	214	6.66	−31.04
Total valid votes		3,213	74.62	+21.39
Eligible voters		4,306		
Election voided
Source: Elections Ontario

Ontario provincial by-election, November 1875: Northumberland East Previous election voided
Party	Candidate	Votes	%	±%
Liberal	James Marshall Ferris	1,709	52.46	+14.76
Conservative	E. Cochrane	1,549	47.54	+11.48
Total valid votes		3,258		
Liberal hold		Swing		+1.64
Source: History of the Electoral Districts, Legislatures and Ministries of the Province of Ontario

1879 Ontario general election: Northumberland East
Party	Candidate	Votes	%	±%
Liberal	James Marshall Ferris	1,887	50.64	−1.81
Conservative	E. Cochrane	1,839	49.36	+1.81
Total valid votes		3,726	71.32	
Eligible voters		5,224		
Liberal hold		Swing		−1.81
Source: Elections Ontario
