= William Arnson Willoughby =

Canadian politician

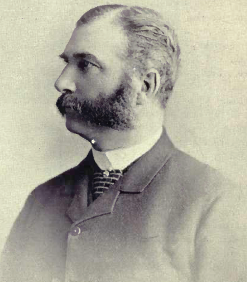

Ontario MPP
- In office 1902–1908
- Preceded by: John Henry Douglas
- Succeeded by: Samuel Greerson Nesbitt
- In office 1888–1898
- Preceded by: Richard Clarke
- Succeeded by: John Henry Douglas
- In office 1886–1887
- Preceded by: James Marshall Ferris
- Succeeded by: Richard Clarke
- Constituency: Northumberland East

Personal details
- Born: February 2, 1844 West Gwillimbury Township, Simcoe County, Canada West
- Died: April 28, 1908 (aged 64) Ontario, Canada
- Party: Conservative
- Occupation: Physician

William Arnson Willoughby (February 2, 1844 – April 28, 1908) was an Ontario physician and political figure. He represented Northumberland East in the Legislative Assembly of Ontario as a Conservative member from 1886 to 1887, from 1888 to 1898 and from 1902 to 1908.

He was born in West Gwillimbury Township, Simcoe County, Canada West in 1844, the son of George H. Willoughby who came to Upper Canada from Ireland. He graduated with an M.D. from Victoria College in 1867 and practised in Grafton and later Colborne. Willoughby served as a member of the Colborne town council, including seven years as reeve. He was warden for Northumberland and Durham Counties in 1884. Willoughby also served as surgeon for the local militia. He was elected to the provincial assembly in 1886 but unseated after an appeal; he was reelected to the seat after the death of Richard Clarke in 1888.
