= Walter William Meacham =

Canadian politician

Ontario MPP
- In office 1886–1889
- Preceded by: George Douglas Hawley
- Succeeded by: Bowen Ebenezer Aylsworth
- Constituency: Lennox

Personal details
- Born: September 22, 1844 Colborne, Canada West
- Died: July 27, 1905 (aged 60) Drummer, Peterborough, Ontario
- Party: Conservative
- Spouse: Maggie Campbell (m. 1870)
- Occupation: Physician

Walter William Meacham (September 22, 1844 – July 27, 1905) was an Ontario physician and political figure. He represented Lennox in the Legislative Assembly of Ontario from 1886 to 1898 as a Conservative member.

He was born at Colborne, Canada West in 1844, the son of Simon Meacham. His grandfather, Seth Meacham, had also been a doctor and came to Upper Canada from New Hampshire in 1801. Meacham studied medicine at John Rolph's Toronto School of Medicine, graduating in 1869. In 1870, he married Maggie Campbell. He practiced in Odessa.

His uncle James Hubbard Meacham was postmaster at Belleville. He died at Drummer, Peterborough, Ontario in 1905.
