= John Henry Douglas =

Canadian politician

Ontario MPP
- In office 1898–1902
- Preceded by: William Arnson Willoughby
- Succeeded by: William Arnson Willoughby
- Constituency: Northumberland East

Personal details
- Born: June 22, 1851 Warkworth, Canada West
- Died: December 20, 1930 (aged 79) Toronto, Ontario
- Party: Liberal
- Spouse: Clara Jane Boyce (m. 1880)
- Occupation: Farmer

John Henry Douglas (June 22, 1851 – December 12, 1930) was a farmer and politician in Ontario, Canada. He represented Northumberland East in the Legislative Assembly of Ontario from 1898 to 1902 as a Liberal.

The son of Donald Douglas and Elizabeth Waters, he was born in Warkworth, Canada West. In 1880, he married Clara Jane Boyce. His election in 1898 was declared void but he was reelected in a by-election held in December later that same year.
