= John Thomas Grange =

Canadian politician

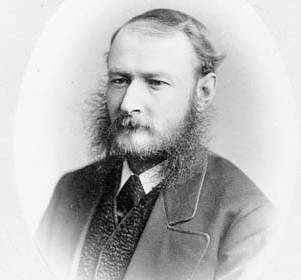

Ontario MPP
- In office 1871–1879
- Preceded by: John Stevenson
- Succeeded by: George Douglas Hawley
- Constituency: Lennox

Personal details
- Born: January 30, 1837 Napanee, Upper Canada
- Died: April 20, 1924 (aged 87) Kingston, Ontario
- Party: Conservative
- Spouse: Jane Ann Scales (m. 1857)
- Relations: Joseph Longford Haycock (brother in law)
- Occupation: Merchant

John Thomas Grange (January 30, 1837 – April 20, 1924) was an Ontario merchant and political figure. He represented Lennox in the Legislative Assembly of Ontario as a Conservative member from 1871 to 1879.

The son of William Grange, he was born in Napanee, Upper Canada in 1837. Grange served on the town council and was reeve of Napanee. In 1857, he married Jane Ann Scales. Grange ran unsuccessfully for a seat in the Canadian House of Commons in 1867. He died in 1924. His sister Martha married Ontario MPP Joseph Haycock.

== Electoral history ==
1871 Ontario general election: Lennox
Party	Candidate	Votes	%	±%
Conservative	John Thomas Grange	1,183	56.41	+3.12
Conservative	John Stevenson	914	43.59	−9.71
Turnout		2,097	62.95	−3.40
Eligible voters		3,331		
Conservative hold		Swing		+6.41
Source: Elections Ontario

1875 Ontario general election: Lennox
Party	Candidate	Votes	%	±%
Independent Conservative	John Thomas Grange	1,065	54.36	−2.05
Liberal	T.W. Casey	510	26.03	
Independent	P.D. Booth	384	19.60	
Turnout		1,959	53.47	−9.49
Eligible voters		3,664		
Independent Conservative hold		Swing		−2.05
Source: Elections Ontario
