= William Wilson Webb =

Canadian politician

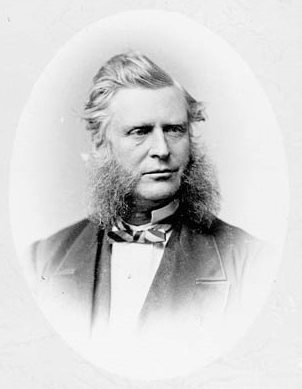

Ontario MPP
- In office 1871–1874
- Preceded by: John Eyre
- Succeeded by: James Marshall Ferris
- Constituency: Northumberland East

Personal details
- Born: July 28, 1827 Colborne, Upper Canada
- Died: June 30, 1894 (aged 66) Brighton, Ontario
- Party: Liberal
- Occupation: Businessman

William Wilson Webb (28 July 1827 - June 30, 1894) was an Ontario businessman and political figure. He represented Northumberland East in the Legislative Assembly of Ontario as a Liberal member from 1871 to 1874.

Webb was born near Colborne in Upper Canada, the son of an Irish immigrant. He was a merchant in Brighton and served as reeve of Brighton in 1864 and 1865.

== Electoral history ==
1871 Ontario general election: Northumberland East
Party	Candidate	Votes	%	±%
Liberal	William Wilson Webb	694	37.70	−26.86
Conservative	John Eyre	664	36.07	+0.71
Independent	Mr. Meyers	483	26.24	
Turnout		1,841	53.22	−13.75
Eligible voters		3,459		
Liberal hold		Swing		−13.79
Source: Elections Ontario

1875 Ontario general election: Northumberland East
Party	Candidate	Votes	%	±%
Liberal	James Marshall Ferris	1,551	48.27	+10.58
Conservative	E. Cochrane	1,448	45.07	+9.00
Liberal	William Wilson Webb	214	6.66	−31.04
Total valid votes		3,213	74.62	+21.39
Eligible voters		4,306		
Election voided
Source: Elections Ontario
