= Nicholas Awrey =

Ontario MPP
- In office 1879–1898
- Preceded by: William Sexton
- Succeeded by: John Dickenson
- Constituency: Wentworth South

Personal details
- Born: June 8, 1851 Binbrook Township, Wentworth County, Canada West
- Died: June 11, 1897 (aged 46) Hamilton, Ontario
- Party: Liberal
- Spouse: Ann Hasteltine Barlow (m. 1872)
- Occupation: Farmer

Nicholas Awrey (June 8, 1851 – June 11, 1897) was an Ontario farmer and political figure. He represented Wentworth South in the Legislative Assembly of Ontario from 1879 to 1898 as a Liberal member.

He was born in Binbrook Township, Wentworth County, Canada West in 1851, the son of Israel Awrey who was the son of a United Empire Loyalist of Irish descent and Elizabeth Rymal, whose uncle Jacob Rymal took part in the Upper Canada Rebellion. In 1872, he married Ann Hasteltine Barlow. Awrey was president of the Provincial Farmer's Institute, served on the board for the Central Fair Association and was a district representative in the Agriculture and Arts Association of Ontario. He also served on the municipal council. Awrey represented Ontario at the World's Columbian Exposition of 1893. He was a member of the Freemasons.

He died of Bright's disease in 1897. Awrey, a geographical township in Sudbury District, was named after him.
