= Wesley Montgomery =

Ontario MPP
- In office 1919–1923
- Preceded by: Samuel Greerson Nesbitt
- Succeeded by: James Franklin Beatty Belford
- Constituency: Northumberland East

Personal details
- Born: May 28, 1857 Brighton, Canada West
- Died: February 14, 1937 (aged 79) Northumberland County, Ontario
- Party: United Farmers
- Spouse: Gertrude Wade (m. 1891)
- Occupation: Apple farmer

Wesley Montgomery (December 11, 1859 – February 14, 1937) was an Ontario apple farmer and political figure. He represented Northumberland East in the Legislative Assembly of Ontario from 1919 to 1923 as a United Farmers of Ontario member.

He was born in Brighton Township, Canada West, the son of Cornelius Montgomery and Elizabeth Lawson, both of whom were Canadians. His grandfather immigrated to Canada from the United Kingdom in 1814. Montgomery taught at schools for several years. On May 28, 1891, he married Gertrude Wade, and together they had one daughter. He was a methodist.
