= Ebon Rinaldo Wigle =

Canadian politician from Ontario

Member of the Ontario Provincial Parliament for Huron Centre
- In office June 25, 1923 – October 18, 1926
- Preceded by: John Govenlock
- Succeeded by: constituency abolished

Personal details
- Born: c.1879
- Died: February 9, 1941 London, Ontario, Canada
- Party: Conservative

Ebon Rinaldo Wigle (c. 1879 – February 9, 1941) was a Canadian politician from the Conservative Party of Ontario. He represented Huron Centre in the Legislative Assembly of Ontario from 1923 to 1926.

Wigle died in London, Ontario on February 9, 1941, at the age of 62.

== See also ==
- 16th Parliament of Ontario
