= Wentworth South (provincial electoral district) =

Ontario electoral district

Defunct provincial electoral district
- Legislature: Legislative Assembly of Ontario
- District created: 1867
- District abolished: 1933
- First contested: 1867
- Last contested: 1929

Wentworth South was an electoral riding in Ontario, Canada. It was created in 1867 at the time of confederation and was renamed Wentworth in 1933 before the 1934 election.

== Members of Provincial Parliament ==
Wentworth South
Assembly	Years	Member	Party
1st	1867–1871	William Sexton	Liberal
2nd	1871–1874	William Sexton	Liberal
3rd	1875–1879	William Sexton	Liberal
4th	1879–1883	Nicholas Awrey	Liberal
5th	1883–1886	Nicholas Awrey	Liberal
6th	1886–1890	Nicholas Awrey	Liberal
7th	1890–1894	Nicholas Awrey	Liberal
8th	1894–1898	Nicholas Awrey	Liberal
9th	1898–1902	John Dickenson	Liberal
10th	1902–1904	John Dickenson	Liberal
11th	1905–1908	Daniel Reed	Liberal
12th	1908–1911	Daniel Reed	Liberal
13th	1911–1914	James Regan	Conservative
14th	1914–1919	James Regan	Conservative
15th	1919–1923	Wilson A. Crockett	United Farmers
16th	1923–1926	Thomas Joseph Mahoney	Conservative
17th	1926–1929	Thomas Joseph Mahoney	Conservative
18th	1929–1934	Thomas Joseph Mahoney	Conservative
Renamed Wentworth before 1934 election
Sourced from the Ontario Legislative Assembly

== Election results ==
1867 Ontario general election
Party	Candidate	Votes	%
Liberal	William Sexton	1,002	50.07
Conservative	T. White	999	49.93
Total valid votes		2,001	83.24
Eligible voters		2,404	
Liberal pickup new district.			
Source: Elections Ontario

1871 Ontario general election
Party	Candidate	Votes	%	±%
Liberal	William Sexton	957	66.97	+16.89
Conservative	J.V.W. Spohn	472	33.03	−16.89
Turnout		1,429	56.08	−27.16
Eligible voters		2,548		
Liberal hold		Swing		+16.89
Source: Elections Ontario

1875 Ontario general election
Party	Candidate	Votes	%	±%
Liberal	William Sexton	944	71.14	+4.17
Conservative	J.V.W. Spohn	383	28.86	−4.17
Total valid votes		1,327	44.70	−11.39
Eligible voters		2,969		
Liberal hold		Swing		+4.17
Source: Elections Ontario

1879 Ontario general election
Party	Candidate	Votes	%	±%
Liberal	Nicholas Awrey	1,231	50.02	+21.16
Conservative	Franklin Carpenter	1,230	49.98	−21.16
Total valid votes		2,461	66.19	+21.50
Eligible voters		3,718		
Conservative gain from Liberal		Swing		+21.16
Source: Elections Ontario: On recount, Nicholas Awrey was elected with a majority of nine votes.
