= James Arthur McCausland =

Canadian politician from Ontario

Member of the Ontario Provincial Parliament for Toronto Southwest Seat A
- In office June 25, 1923 – October 18, 1926 Serving with Fred McBrien
- Preceded by: Hartley Dewart
- Succeeded by: constituency abolished

Personal details
- Party: Conservative

James Arthur McCausland was a Canadian politician from the Conservative Party of Ontario. He represented Toronto Southwest in the Legislative Assembly of Ontario from 1923 to 1926.

== See also ==
- 16th Parliament of Ontario
