= James Belford (Canadian politician) =

Canadian politician from Ontario

James Franklin Beatty Belford

Member of the Ontario Provincial Parliament for Northumberland East
- In office June 25, 1923 – October 18, 1926
- Preceded by: Wesley Montgomery
- Succeeded by: constituency abolished

Personal details
- Party: Conservative

James Franklin Beatty Belford was a Canadian politician from the Conservative Party of Ontario. He represented Northumberland East in the Legislative Assembly of Ontario from 1923 to 1926.

== See also ==
- 16th Parliament of Ontario
