= William Keith (Canadian politician) =

Canadian politician from Ontario

Member of the Ontario Provincial Parliament for York North
- In office June 25, 1923 – October 18, 1926
- Preceded by: Thomas Herbert Lennox
- Succeeded by: Peter William Pearson

Personal details
- Party: Conservative

William Keith was a Canadian politician from the Conservative Party of Ontario. He represented York North in the Legislative Assembly of Ontario from 1923 to 1926.

== See also ==
- 16th Parliament of Ontario
