= Frank Worthington Wilson =

Canadian politician from Ontario

Member of the Ontario Provincial Parliament for Windsor East Windsor (1923–1926)
- In office June 25, 1923 – April 3, 1934
- Preceded by: James Craig Tolmie
- Succeeded by: David Croll

Personal details
- Party: Conservative

Frank Worthington Wilson was a Canadian politician from the Conservative Party of Ontario. He represented the constituencies of Windsor and Windsor East in the Legislative Assembly of Ontario from 1929 to 1934.

== See also ==
- 16th Parliament of Ontario
- 17th Parliament of Ontario
- 18th Parliament of Ontario
