= Windsor (Ontario provincial electoral district) =

Provincial electoral district in Ontario, Canada

Ontario electoral district

Defunct provincial electoral district
- Legislature: Legislative Assembly of Ontario
- District created: 1914
- District abolished: 1926
- First contested: 1914
- Last contested: 1923

Windsor was a provincial electoral district in Ontario, Canada. It existed from 1914 to 1934, when it was abolished into Windsor East and Windsor West. It consisted of the city of Windsor.

== Members of Provincial Parliament ==
Windsor
Assembly	Years	Member	Party
Riding created from Essex North
14th	1914–1919	James Craig Tolmie	Liberal
15th	1919–1923	James Craig Tolmie	Liberal
16th	1923–1926	Frank Worthington Wilson	Conservative
Riding dissolved into Windsor East and Windsor West

== See also ==
- List of Ontario provincial electoral districts
- Canadian provincial electoral districts
