= Thomas Joseph Mahoney =

Canadian politician from Ontario

Member of the Ontario Provincial Parliament for Wentworth South
- In office June 25, 1923 – April 3, 1934
- Preceded by: Wilson Crockett
- Succeeded by: constituency abolished

Personal details
- Party: Conservative

Thomas Joseph Mahoney was a Canadian politician from the Conservative Party of Ontario. He represented Wentworth South in the Legislative Assembly of Ontario from 1923 to 1934.

== See also ==
- 16th Parliament of Ontario
- 17th Parliament of Ontario
- 18th Parliament of Ontario
