= Charles Wesley Hambly =

Canadian politician

Ontario MPP
- In office 1929–1934
- Preceded by: Edward Ming
- Succeeded by: Riding abolished
- Constituency: Frontenac—Lennox
- In office 1923–1926
- Preceded by: John Perry Vrooman
- Succeeded by: Riding abolished
- Constituency: Lennox

Personal details
- Born: June 3, 1863 Nepanee, Canada West
- Died: November 10, 1942 (aged 79) Kingston, Ontario
- Party: Conservative
- Spouse: Grace Wagner (m. 1890)
- Occupation: Drover

Charles Wesley Hambly (June 3, 1863 – November 10, 1942) was a drover and political figure in Ontario. He represented Lennox from 1923 to 1926 and Frontenac—Lennox from 1929 to 1934 in the Legislative Assembly of Ontario as a Conservative member.

He was born in Napanee, Ontario, the son of William Hambly and Catherine Sills, both natives of England. In 1890, Hambly married Grace Wagner. He served as reeve of North Fredericksburgh from 1908 to 1914 and was reeve of Napanee in 1923. He died in Kingston in 1942.
