= Reginald Amherst Fowler =

Canadian farmer and politician (1845 – 1922)

Reginald Amherst Fowler (July 25, 1845 – March 5, 1922) was a Canadian farmer, merchant and politician. He represented Lennox in the Legislative Assembly of Ontario from 1918 to 1922 as a Conservative.

The second son of Daniel Fowler and Elizabeth Gale, he was born on Amherst Island and was educated in Kingston. In 1881, he married Rachel Ann Howard. He served as Warden of Lennox and Addington County in 1903.

Fowler was first elected to the Ontario assembly in a 1918 by-election held following the death of Thomas George Carscallen.

He died in office in Toronto in 1922 at the age of 76.
