= Lennox County =

Former county of Ontario, Canada

Coordinates: 44.14°N 76.95°W

Lennox County is a historic county in the Canadian province of Ontario which now forms part of Lennox and Addington County. It was named after Charles Lennox, 3rd Duke of Richmond.

Its territory is the same as what now composes the town of Greater Napanee.

== Historical evolution ==
The county of Lennox, situated within the Mecklenburg District, was originally created as an electoral district for the Legislative Assembly of Upper Canada in 1792 and its original limits were described as being:

bounded on the east by the westernmost line of the county of Addington, on the south and west by the Bay of Quinte, to the easternmost boundary of the Mohawk village, thence by a line running along the westernmost boundary of the late township of Richmond, running north sixteen degrees west to the depth of twelve miles, thence running north seventy-four degrees east until it meets the northwesternmost boundary of the county of Addington, and comprehending all the islands in the bays and nearest to the shores thereof.

Mecklenburg was renamed as the "Midland District" in 1792.

Lennox County was combined with Addington County and Amherst Island in 1800 to become the incorporated counties of Lennox and Addington. The counties would regain their separate identities in 1845, but would continue to be united for electoral purposes.

At the beginning of 1850, Midland District was abolished, and the United Counties of Frontenac, Lennox and Addington replaced it for municipal and judicial purposes. In 1860, Lennox and Addington were formally amalgamated as the County of Lennox and Addington.

== Historical townships ==
- Adolphustown Township - The township is now part of Greater Napanee.
- Fredericksburgh Township – The township was settled in 1784, and officially separated into North Fredericksburgh and South Fredericksburgh in 1857.
- North Fredericksburgh Township - The township is now part of Greater Napanee.
- Richmond Township - The township is now part of Greater Napanee.
- South Fredericksburgh Township - The township is now part of Greater Napanee.

== See also ==
- Census geographic units of Canada
- List of census divisions of Ontario
- List of townships in Ontario
