= Paul Poisson (politician) =

Canadian politician

Ontario MPP
- In office 1926–1934
- Preceded by: Edward Philip Tellier
- Succeeded by: Adélard Trottier
- Constituency: Essex North

Personal details
- Born: July 25, 1887 Belle River, Ontario
- Died: December 3, 1983 (aged 96) Tecumseh, Ontario
- Party: Conservative
- Spouse: Gertrude Connor (m. 1910)
- Children: 8
- Occupation: Doctor

Military service
- Allegiance: Canadian
- Branch/service: Canadian Army Medical Corps
- Years of service: 1914-1918, 1940-1945
- Rank: Colonel
- Battles/wars: Battle of Flers–Courcelette
- Awards: Military Cross

Paul Poisson MC VD KSG (July 25, 1887 – December 3, 1983), was the first mayor of the town of Tecumseh, Ontario, Canada in 1921. He also served in the Ontario Legislature from 1926 to 1934. He served in the cabinet of George Stewart Henry as a Minister without Portfolio. A veteran of both World War I and World War II, he was awarded the Military Cross for his contribution in the Coucelette Campaign in 1915. He also served as President Medical Board M.D. No. 1 at Medical Headquarters Ottawa, as Officer Commanding Montreal Military Hospital. Prior to politics and military service, Poisson ran a medical practice in Sandwich East, currently the Town of Tecumseh.

== Early life and career ==
Born to Damas and Helen (Diestbourg) Poisson in Belle River, Ontario, Poisson attended elementary school prior to pursuing high school studies at Paterson in Windsor in 1900. He joined the militia in Windsor, at the age of 17. After graduating from Paterson, he attended the University of Western Ontario, at London, Ontario where "he graduated as M.D. with Honours" 9 June 1909, and began his medical practice on 16 October 1910. At the age of 23, Poisson married Gertrude Connor, daughter of Michael Connor of Kitchener, Ontario, on 11 January 1911.

== Political career ==
After only two years of medical practice, Poisson became active in municipal politics and served a two-year term as a councillor (1912–1913) in the township of Sandwich East. He then ran as a Conservative in the June 1914 provincial election in the Essex North riding. In this 1914 election, the 26-year-old Poisson lost by 640 votes to Liberal candidate Severin Ducharme. Following this provincial election loss, the First World War suspended his political aspirations until 1919 when he unsuccessfully ran for a second time in the riding of Essex North. Alphonse George Tisdelle of the United Farmers of Ontario defeated Poisson by 3,848 votes on 13 October 1919. The aspiration to sit in Queen's Park took a back seat when he was appointed as Tecumseh's first mayor in 1921, and he remained in this position until 1925.

He returned provincial politics in 1926 by winning the Essex North riding, without opposition, and served as minister without portfolio in the cabinet of Conservative Premier George S. Henry from 1931 to 1934.

== Military career ==
After joining Canada's military unit in Windsor at the age of 17, Poisson's military career took off as a result of both the First and Second World War. After serving four years, eight months in World War I, Poisson arrived home with the promotion from Captain to Major and decorations from King George V at Buckingham Palace in 1916. Poisson was awarded the Military Cross for his contribution of the 1916 Courcelette Campaign where he was wounded. Two other soldiers alongside Poisson, died from injuries resulting from the same explosion.

Despite being away from the battlefield in the Second World War, Poisson's contribution was still vital. From 1940-1945, he served "as President Medical Board M.D. No. 1, at Medical Headquarters Ottawa, as Officer Commanding Montreal Military Hospital." After 41 years of military service, he resigned from every rank from private to colonel in 1945.

== Final years and achievements ==
Despite the appointment as Registrar of Deeds for Essex County – to which retired from in 1959 – Poisson dedicated his post political and military years to “leadership in various religious, educational and bilingual groups.” "He received one of the highest honours that can be bestowed upon a layman by the Catholic Church" when Bishop Cody endowed Poisson “with the Order of St. Gregory (K.S.G.).” His contribution to his faith also included the founding of the Canadian Catholic Club, and serving as a member of the Roman Catholic society of Knights of Columbus. Other club memberships include the Beach Grove Country Club and Richelieu, to which he was once President.

Poisson and Gertrude Connor (Poisson) raised eight children, and enjoyed the company of 36 grandchildren and ten great grandchildren. Poisson's wife of 60 years, Gertrude Connor, died March 1971.

Poisson died in October 1982.
