= Rumball =

Rumball is a surname. Notable people with the surname include:

- Bob Rumball (1929–2016), Canadian pastor and advocate
- Frederick Rumball (1853–1940), Canadian merchant and politician
- Lesley Rumball (born 1973), New Zealand netball player
- Lucas Rumball (born 1995), Canadian rugby union player
- Sylvia Rumball (born 1939), New Zealand scientific research ethicist

== See also ==
- Rum ball
