= Ernest Pacaud =

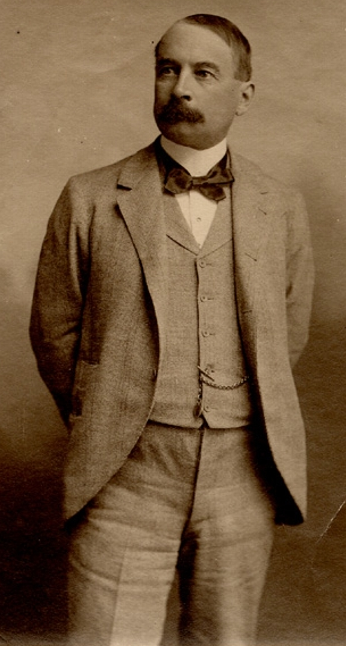
- Born: August 25, 1850; Trois-Rivières, Canada East
- Died: April 19, 1904 (aged 53); Quebec City, Quebec
- Relatives: Philippe-Napoléon Pacaud, father

Ernest Pacaud (August 25, 1850 – April 19, 1904) was a Quebec lawyer and journalist.

He was born Philippe-Olivier Pacaud in Trois-Rivières, Canada East in 1850, the son of Philippe-Napoléon Pacaud. He attended school in Trois-Rivières and then studied at the Séminaire de Nicolet. Pacaud articled in law with his uncle Édouard-Louis Pacaud, was called to the bar in 1872 and set up practice in Arthabaska. He joined the local militia during the Fenian raids.

Pacaud is credited with convincing Wilfrid Laurier to enter politics. Pacaud himself ran unsuccessfully for a seat in the Quebec assembly in an 1874 by-election. He married Marie-Louise, the daughter of Joseph-Édouard Turcotte, in 1876. In 1877, he founded Le Journal d'Arthabaska. In 1878, he was named protonotary in the Quebec Superior Court, clerk for the Circuit Court and crown clerk for the Trois-Rivières district. When the Conservatives came to power the following year, he was relieved of these appointments and he returned to the practice of law in Trois-Rivières. He became editor of a local newspaper, La Concorde.

In 1880, he helped found the Liberal newspaper L'Électeur at Quebec City and became its editor and later its owner. He ran unsuccessfully in Bellechasse for a seat in the House of Commons in 1882. In 1886, he played an important part in the election victory of the Parti National of Honoré Mercier. In December 1896, L'Électeur became Le Soleil when the Quebec Catholic bishops forbade the reading of Pacaud's newspaper after he had published several editorials critical of the church. In 1903, Pacaud fell seriously ill and the Compagnie de Publication Le Soleil was formed to take over the operation of the paper.

He died at Quebec City in 1904.

His brother Gaspard Pacaud was a newspaper editor and also served in the Ontario legislative assembly. His son Lucien Turcotte Pacaud served in the Canadian House of Commons.
