= Alexander Parent =

Canadian politician (1908–1961)

Member of the Ontario Provincial Parliament for Essex North
- In office June 4, 1945 – April 27, 1948
- Preceded by: Arthur Nelson Alles
- Succeeded by: Gordon Bennett Ellis

Personal details
- Born: 1908
- Died: December 25, 1961 (aged 53) Windsor, Ontario, Canada
- Party: Liberal-Labour (1945), Labour (1946-1948)

Alexander A. Parent was a Canadian politician who was Liberal-Labour MPP for Essex North from 1945 to 1948.

Parent was president of United Auto Workers Local 195 in Windsor, Ontario in the 1940s, and a supporter of the Communist Party of Canada, which at the time was known as the Labor-Progressive Party. In the 1945 Ontario general election, Parent was nominated by the UAW-CIO as one of three Labour candidates in the election. Parent ran in Essex North, George Burt, the UAW's Canadian director, ran in Windsor-Walkerville and Windsor mayor Arthur Reaume ran in Windsor—Sandwich. All three were jointly nominated by the Communist Labor-Progressive Party and the Ontario Liberal Party and ran as Liberal-Labour candidates and targeted ridings held by the Co-operative Commonwealth Federation.

Parent was elected, and initially caucused with the Liberal Party but quit the Liberal caucus in January 1946, denouncing the Liberals as "reactionary", in order to sit as a "straight Labor representative", caucusing with Labor-Progressive MPPs J.B. Salsberg and A. A. MacLeod.

He remained president of Local 195 until March 1946 when he was defeated in his bid for re-election to the union office by Earl Watson by 2,200 votes to 1,600 votes.

Parent did not run in the 1948 Ontario general election, and his riding was re-taken by the CCF.

He died on December 25, 1961, at the age of 53.

== See also ==
- 22nd Parliament of Ontario
