= Émilie Barthe =

Canadian wife of a politician and nun (1849–1930)

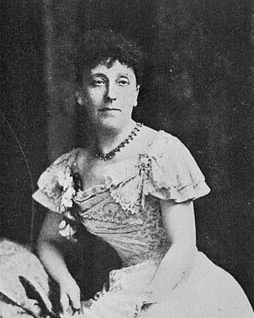
An undated photograph of Émilie Barthe

Émilie Barthe (March 26, 1849 – May 10, 1930) was a Canadian most widely known for the rumours of having an intimate relationship with Prime Minister Sir Wilfrid Laurier. Her son, Armand Lavergne, is thought to be their illegitimate offspring. Late in her life she became a Catholic nun.

== Early life ==
Émilie Barthe was the daughter of Joseph-Guillaume Barthe, a lawyer, journalist and political figure in Canada East, and Louise-Adélaïde Pacaud, the sister of Édouard-Louis Pacaud.

== Marriage and children ==
In 1876, Barthe married Joseph Lavergne, a Quebec lawyer, editor and political figure, and changed her last name to Lavergne. Their first child was born in 1877, Gabrielle. In 1880, they had a son Armand Lavergne, who became a lawyer, journalist and political figure, serving in the federal House of Commons and the Legislative Assembly of Quebec.

== Relationship with Wilfrid Laurier ==
Beginning in 1878, Laurier had an "ambiguous relationship" with the then married Émilie Barthe. Despite being married to Zoé Lafontaine, he maintained his relationship to Barthe as she relished literature and politics just as he did, while Lady Laurier was not an intellectual.

The two corresponded with letters. Towards the end of her life she gave 41 of Laurier's letters to her nephew. Among those letters was this passage from August 23, 1891:

"I would like to see you, my dear, dear, friend, not to have your explanations, but simply to see you, to hear you, to look in your eyes, to listen to your voice, to feel that it is you, to be sure of it, to enjoy the consciousness of it."

— Laurier, August 23, 1891.

When Laurier became the seventh Prime Minister of Canada on July 11, 1896, he could not resume his affair with her. It was by his decision that on August 4, 1897, Joseph Lavergne, who had been a Member of Parliament, was made a judge of the Superior Court for the district of Ottawa. This appointment encouraged the family to move to Ottawa, where Barthe and Laurier could continue their relations.

When Laurier began to realize the potential damage of the rumours, he returned Barthe's letters to her and in 1901 transferred Joseph Lavergne from Ottawa to Montreal. He limited his communication by sending his regards to her through her husband and children.

Armand Lavergne is widely thought to be the illegitimate son of Barthe and Laurier. When Armand was younger, he bore a facial resemblance to Laurier, which was remarked on at the time.

== Later life ==
In 1922, her husband, Joseph Lavergne died. On October 15, 1924, at the age of 75, Barthe joined the Grey Nuns as a recluse.

The loss of her eldest child and only daughter, Gabrielle, in 1928, sent Barthe into a depression.

Barthe died on May 10, 1930. She was buried in Arthabaska.
