= Joseph-Guillaume Barthe =

Canadian lawyer and politician (1816–1893)

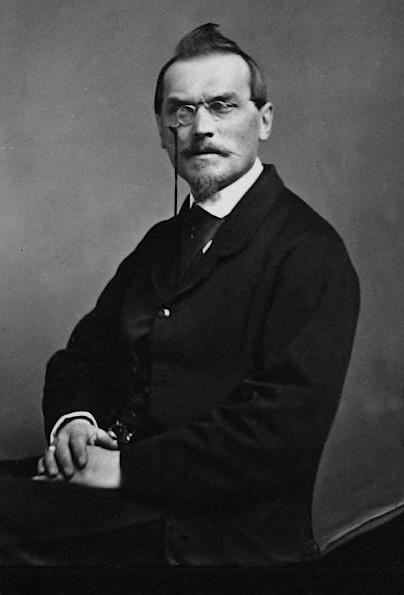

Member of the Legislative Assembly of the Province of Canada for Yamaska
- In office 1841–1844
- Preceded by: New position
- Succeeded by: Léon Rousseau

Personal details
- Born: March 16, 1816 Carleton, Lower Canada
- Died: August 4, 1893 (aged 77) Montreal, Quebec
- Party: Anti-Unionist; French-Canadian Group
- Spouse: Louise-Adélaïde Pacaud
- Relations: Georges-Isidore Barthe (brother); Édouard-Louis Pacaud (brother-in-law); Philippe-Napoléon Pacaud (brother-in-law)
- Children: 7, including Émilie Barthe
- Education: Séminaire de Nicolet
- Occupation: Journalist, lawyer, poet, author

Joseph-Guillaume Barthe (March 16, 1816 – August 4, 1893) was a lawyer, journalist, poet and political figure in Lower Canada and Canada East, Province of Canada (now Quebec). He served one term in the Legislative Assembly of the Province of Canada, as a supporter of Louis-Joseph Papineau and Denis-Benjamin Viger. He opposed Louis-Hippolyte LaFontaine's policy of building a reform alliance within the framework of the Province of Canada.

== Early life and family ==
Barthe was born March 16, 1816, in Carleton, Lower Canada, on the south shore of the Gaspé peninsula, the eldest son of Joseph Barthe and Marie-Louise-Esther Tapin. His grandfather, Thaddée-Alexis Barthe, emigrated from France prior to 1784. His father, Joseph, was a farmer and then a sea captain, who engaged in a legal battle with Robert Christie, a prominent lawyer and member of the Legislative Assembly of Lower Canada. Joseph Barthe lost some of his property as a result and had to relocate to a different part of the Gaspé. He sent Joseph-Guillaume, then still in childhood, away to Trois-Rivières to live with his uncle, Étienne Tapin, for his primary schooling. Later on, Joseph-Guillaume attended the Séminaire de Nicolet, also in the Trois-Rivières area, for secondary education. He did not see his family again until his late teens, in 1834.

Barth attended the Séminaire de Nicolet for seven years between 1827 and 1834. He completed his first year of the philosophy course at Nicolet, but when he returned for the second year he could not successfully complete the philosophy program. Shifting his interests to medicine, he studied under Dr. René-Joseph Kimber, a doctor in Trois-Rivières, but without success. Barthe then studied law with Edward Barnard, a lawyer at Trois-Rivières. Completing his legal education, Barthe was called to the bar on March 17, 1840.

During his time in Trois-Rivières, Barthe was exposed to politics. His uncle, Étienne Tapin, was well-respected in the area and was friends with many local notables. Barnard and Kimber were both members of the Legislative Assembly, and both were members of the Parti patriote. The Pacaud brothers, Édouard-Louis Pacaud and Philippe-Napoléon Pacaud, were both classmates with Barthe at the Séminaire de Nicolet, and also went on to legal and political careers. All of them supported the Patriote cause in the political struggles of the day.

In 1844, Barthe married Louise-Adélaïde Pacaud, sister of the Pacaud brothers. The couple had seven children. His brother Georges-Isidore Barthe also became a lawyer and journalist, and served in the Canadian House of Commons.

== Journalism and poetry ==
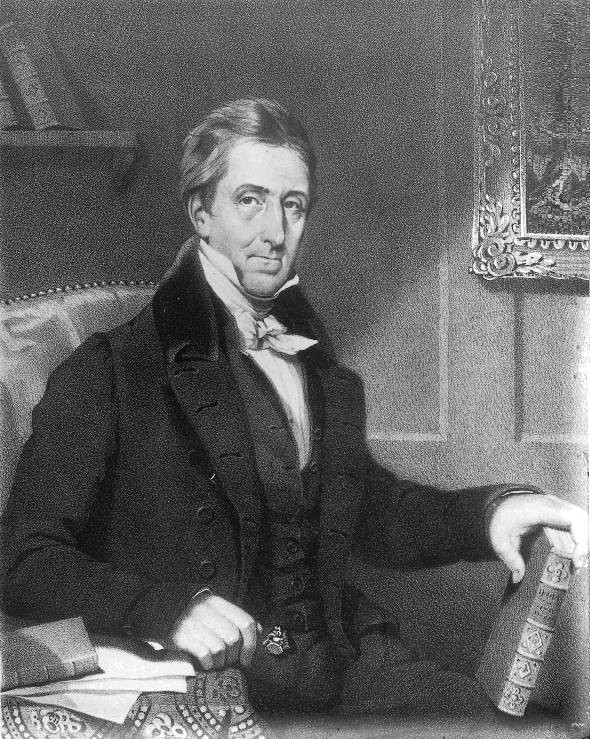
Denis-Benjamin Viger, who offered Barthe the editorship of L'Aurore des Canadas and became his political mentor

Although he had successfully been called to the bar, Barthe did not practise as a lawyer. Instead, he began a career as a journalist, poet and author. He started by publishing letters and poetry on political matters in the newspaper Le Populaire, under the pseudonym "Marie-Louise". In 1837, he spoke at a Patriote assembly in Yamachiche, in the St. Maurice region. The Lower Canada Rebellion broke out in 1837, and again in 1838. After the Rebellion had been suppressed, Barthe wrote a poem Aux exilés politiques canadiens, which appeared in Le Fantasque on December 26, 1838. As a result, he was put in jail at Trois-Rivières for the first three months of 1839, cementing his reputation as a Patriote. On his release, he published an article about his experience.

In 1839, Barthe was offered the position of editor of the Montreal newspaper L’Aurore des Canadas, the only French-language newspaper in Montreal at that time. The publisher who made the offer was Denis-Benjamin Viger, who had also been imprisoned for his role in the Rebellion. Viger had a long career in the Parti canadien and then the Parti patriote, and was a strong supporter of Louis-Joseph Papineau. Barthe was grateful to Viger as his patron for the rest of his life, and thereafter consistently supported Viger's political positions.

As editor of L'Aurore des Canadas, Barthe emphasised the need for French-Canadians to become more active in the commercial world, and to compete with the more advanced commercial activities of Upper Canada. In this, he took a similar position to Étienne Parent, who wrote and lectured on the need for French-Canadians to expand from the traditional economic activities of rural life and the professions. He also followed Parent's emphasis on the need for French-Canadian identity to become the rallying point, the ultimate "political dogma", in French-Canadian society.

== Province of Canada politics ==
=== Member of the Legislative Assembly, 1841–1844 ===
Following the rebellion in Lower Canada, and the similar rebellion in 1837 in Upper Canada (now Ontario), the British government decided to merge the two provinces into a single province, as recommended by Lord Durham in the Durham Report. The Union Act, 1840, passed by the British Parliament, abolished the two provinces and their separate parliaments. It created the Province of Canada, with a single Parliament for the entire province, composed of an elected Legislative Assembly and an appointed Legislative Council. The Governor General initially retained a strong position in the government.

The first general elections for the new Parliament were held in the spring of 1841. Barthe stood for election as an anti-unionist candidate. He was elected to the Legislative Assembly of the Province of Canada for the Yamaska riding, defeating a pro-union candidate, Jonathan Würtele.

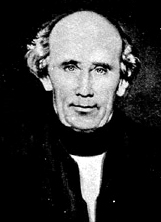
John Neilson, who introduced the motion condemning the union

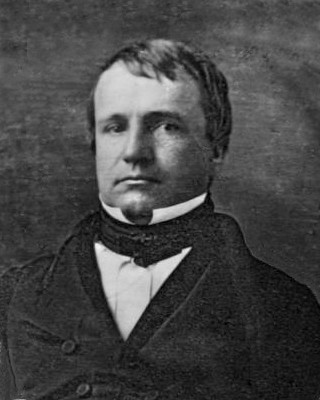
Louis-Hippolyte LaFontaine, who became Barthe's political opponent

In the first session of the new Parliament, the main issue was the union of the Canadas. One of the leaders of the French-Canadian Group, John Neilson, introduced a motion condemning the way the union had been imposed on Lower Canada without consent. All of the members of the French-Canadian Group, including Barthe, voted in favour of the motion and against the union, as did some of the reformers from Upper Canada. The motion was defeated, which was considered a vote in favour of the union. For the rest of the first session, Barthe was a consistent opponent of the Governor General, Lord Sydenham.

In the 1843, there was a major dispute. Louis Hippolyte LaFontaine and Robert Baldwin had been admitted to the Executive Council the year before, but they now reached an impasse with the new Governor General, Sir Charles Metcalfe. All but one of the members of the Council resigned, in protest at Metcalfe's refusal to follow the Council's advice in the matter of government appointments. There was a debate in the Assembly and a motion passed, supporting LaFontaine, Baldwin and the other former members of Council. Barthe, like most of the French-Canadian Group, voted in favour of the motion and criticised Metcalfe. Somewhat surprisingly, Viger and Neilson voted in support of Metcalfe. Shortly afterwards, Metcalfe appointed Viger and a conservative member from Upper Canada, William Draper, to the Council.

The reason Viger supported Metcalfe was that he disagreed with LaFontaine's approach of an alliance with Upper Canada reformers. Viger and Neilson did not agree with the concept of responsible government (Neilson called it a "humbug") and preferred coalitions based on ethnicity, rather than common ideological principles. Once Viger was in office, Barthe naturally took his patron's position, and in his newspaper articles in L'Aurore des Canadas was sharply critical of LaFontaine. However, in the 1844 general elections, LaFontaine and his supporters in the French-Canadian Group targeted Viger and his supporters. The French-Canadian electorate in Lower Canada voted largely for LaFontaine's approach. Viger, Neilson, and Barthe were all defeated in their ridings, by candidates who supported LaFontaine's position. Barthe wrote furious articles condemning LaFontaine and the successful candidate in his own riding, Léon Rousseau.

=== Clerk of the Court of Appeals ===
In 1846, Viger retired from politics. Shortly before he retired, he arranged for Barthe to be appointed Clerk of the Court of Appeals, a prestigious and lucrative position. The appointment was heavily criticised as a patronage reward for Barthe, by lawyers in the Quebec bar and also by the elected politicians. When LaFontaine and Baldwin formed the government in 1848, they converted the position from fee-based compensation to a salary of £250. Even though Barthe had stated before the change that he only received £250 as fees, after he was put on salary for that amount he complained bitterly about the change, which he said was a three-quarter reduction in his income. He attempted to appoint his brother-in-law as his deputy, but most of the judges of the Court refused to accept that arrangement and would only sit with Barthe as clerk. Barthe finally resigned in late 1850. He then published articles in L'Avenir stating he was the victim of political partisanship, but did not earn much sympathy.

=== Candidate in 1851 ===
Barthe stood for election in 1851, again in Yamaska, this time as a supporter of the Parti rouge. He was defeated, coming in third place.

== Later life ==
Barthe had become very active in the new Institut canadien de Montréal, an association of relatively young professionals of liberal tendencies, which provided a forum for discussions and public lectures. In 1850, he published an article discussing the abolition of the death penalty.

In 1853, Barthe announced that he could not "endure the haughtiness or the injustice of political adversaries", and moved with his family to France. He had two goals: to encourage greater ties between France and Lower Canada, and to gain an affiliation between the Institut canadien de Montréal and the Institut de France. He lived in France until 1855, but was not successful in his goals. Towards the end of his time in France, he published a book, Le Canada reconquis par la France, in which he encouraged greater French involvement with Lower Canada, including French emigration. The book went into Canadian political history in great detail, but from a strongly partisan view, praising the Parti rouge and attacking LaFontaine. It did not do well in the French markets. Nor did he obtain any affiliation for the Institut canadien de Montréal. He did publish some articles with the Gazette de France.

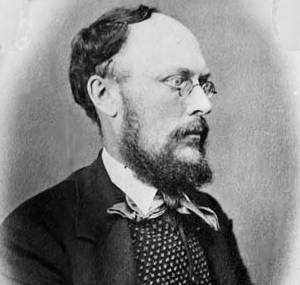
Barthe's brother, George-Isidor, who hired him to edit Le Bas Canada

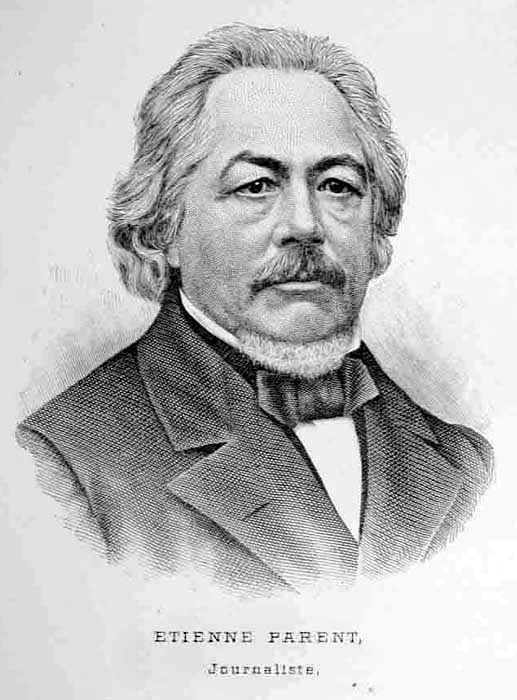
Étienne Parent, who hired Barthe as co-editor of Le Canadien

In 1855, he returned to Canada, initially settling in Trois-Rivières, where he was the editor for two different newspapers, L'Ère nouvelle and Le Bas-Canada, the latter founded by his brother. Late in 1856, he moved to Quebec City where, at the request of Étienne Parent, he was co-editor of Le Canadien until 1862, his last major editorial role. From 1866 onwards, he worked at the Drapeau de Lévis and then the Journal de Lévis.

Around 1870 he moved to Montreal, where he lived in semi-retirement. He wrote his memoirs, Souvenirs d'un demi-siècle, which appeared in 1885. Although his political passions had cooled somewhat, the writing style was difficult to follow. He had a tendency to exaggerate the roles he played, and to outright invent events that historical research shows did not occur. It was nonetheless an important record of the young idealistic generation that came of age in the 1830s, and played a role in the politics of the mid-19th century.

He died in 1893.

His daughter Émilie Barthe eventually gained some notoriety, as the close friend of Prime Minister Wilfrid Laurier. There were persistent rumours that the two had a sexual relationship, and that Laurier was the father of Armand Lavergne, who was said to bear a striking resemblance to Laurier in his youth.

== Works ==
=== Books ===
- Lettre sur le Canada à M. de Monmergué (Paris: Imprimerie de Guiraudet et Jouaust, 1853), 16 pp
- Le Canada reconquis par la France – suivi de pièces justificatives (Paris: Ledoyen, libraire, 1855), 419 pp; includes a portrait, six engravings, and a map; preface by the publisher
- Souvenirs d'un demi-siècle ou Mémoires pour servir à l'histoire contemporaine (Montreal: J. Chapleau & fils, 1885), 482 pp; preface by the author

=== Articles ===
- "Un séjour dans une prison", L’Aurore des Canadas, March 17, 1840, p. 1.
- "L'intempérance sous le rapport politique", L’Aurore des Canadas, July 1840
- "Essai sur l’abolition de la peine de mort", Le Moniteur canadien, January 18, 1850; L’Avenir, February 2 and 5, April 13 and 20, 1850.

=== Newspapers (editor, writer) ===
- La Fantasque
- Le Populaire
- L’Aurore des Canadas
- L'Avenir
- La Gazette de France
- L'Ère nouvelle
- Le Bas-Canada
- Le Canadien
- Le Drapeau de Lévis
- Le Journal de Lévis

=== Fiction and poetry ===
- Three stories and around eighty poems, in Le Populaire et L'Aurore des Canadas
