= Pat Hoy =

Canadian politician

Ontario MPP
- In office 1999–2011
- Preceded by: New riding
- Succeeded by: Rick Nicholls
- Constituency: Chatham-Kent—Essex
- In office 1995–1999
- Preceded by: Pat Hayes
- Succeeded by: Riding abolished
- Constituency: Essex—Kent

Personal details
- Born: September 21, 1950 (age 75) Chatham-Kent, Ontario, Canada
- Party: Liberal
- Spouse: Debbie Murphy
- Occupation: Farmer

Pat Hoy (born September 21, 1950) is a former politician in Ontario, Canada. He was a Liberal member of the Legislative Assembly of Ontario from 1995 to 2011 representing the riding of Chatham-Kent—Essex.

== Background ==
Hoy was born in 1950 in Chatham-Kent, Ontario to John Hoy and Dolores de Witte. Hoy was a farmer in the Merlin area. He served as President of the Kent Federation of Agriculture from 1984 to 1985, and was a member of the Crop Insurance Commission of Ontario from 1987 to 1995 (serving as its Vice-Chair in 1992 and 1993). He is also a founder of the Kent County Agricultural Hall of Fame, and has been a director of the Ontario Federation of Agriculture. In 1972, he married Debbie Murphy. Hoy is known to hold some socially conservative views, including being anti-abortion.

== Politics ==
Hoy was elected to the Ontario legislature in the 1995 provincial election for the riding of Essex—Kent, defeating Progressive Conservative candidate George Kennedy and New Democrat incumbent Pat Hayes by a plurality of about 2,000 votes. The Progressive Conservatives won the election, and Hoy served as his party's agriculture critic for the next four years. He endorsed Dwight Duncan's bid to lead the Ontario Liberal Party in 1996.

Because of redistribution, Hoy was forced to face another incumbent, Progressive Conservative Jack Carroll, in new riding of Chatham-Kent—Essex in the 1999 provincial election. Hoy scored a convincing victory, winning by 8,001 votes. The Tories again won the election, and Hoy continued to serve as his party's agriculture critic until 2000, when he was transferred to transportation.

Hoy was easily re-elected in the provincial election of 2003, which the Liberals won. He became Chair of the Standing Committee on Finance and Economic Affairs in December of that year. He retained the chair position until 2011.

Hoy was elected for a fourth term in the provincial election of 2007. In March 2011, Hoy announced that he was retiring from the legislature and would not run in 2011.
