= Adélard Trottier =

Canadian politician

Ontario MPP
- In office 1934–1943
- Preceded by: Paul Poisson
- Succeeded by: Arthur Nelson Alles
- Constituency: Essex North

Personal details
- Born: November 8, 1879 Lacolle, Quebec
- Died: November 29, 1955 (aged 68) Windsor, Ontario
- Party: Liberal
- Spouse: Beatrice Girard (m. 1908)
- Occupation: Doctor

Adélard Charles Trottier (November 8, 1879 – November 29, 1955) was a physician, surgeon and politician in Ontario, Canada. He represented Essex North in the Legislative Assembly of Ontario from 1934 to 1943 in the Ontario Liberal Party.

The son of Narcisse Trottier and Marie Savage, he was born in Lacolle, Quebec. He taught school for several years. In 1908, Trottier married Beatrice Girard. He served as president of the Medical Society of Ontario.

He was one of several Liberal MPPs elected to constituencies with large French-speaking populations in 1934. Trottier was reelected in 1937.
