= Brooke Nicholls =

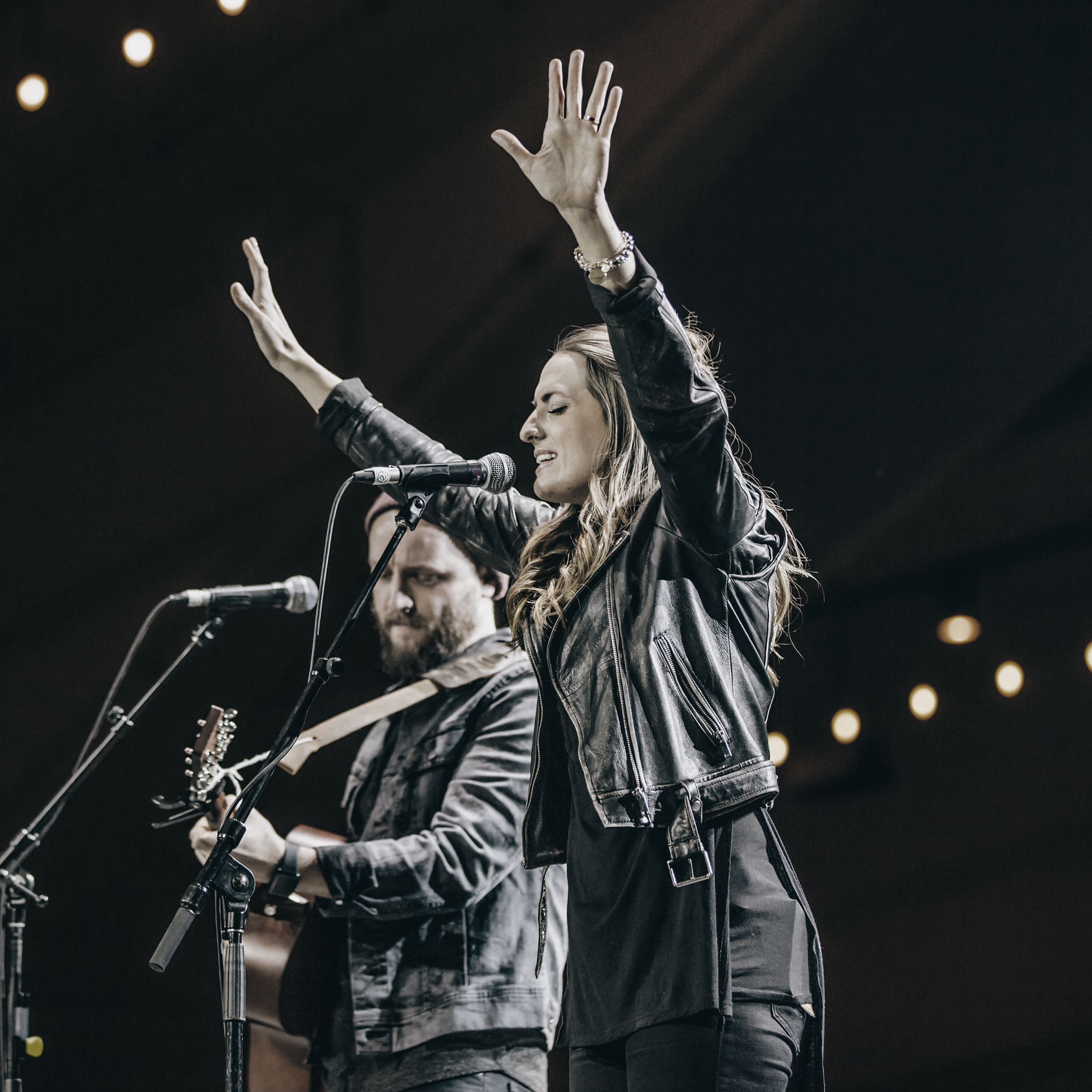

Background information
- Origin: Chatham, Ontario, Canada
- Genres: Worship music
- Years active: 2015-present
- Labels: Independent
- Website: brookenicholls.com

Brooke Nicholls is a Canadian contemporary worship music singer and songwriter. Since her debut album in 2016, she has been awarded ten Covenant Awards and been nominated for two Juno Awards. In 2024, she became the Worship Pastor of Village Church in Surrey, BC.

== History ==
Nicholls released her debut album Found In You on December 5, 2016. She was named New Artist of the Year and Female Vocalist of the Year at the Covenant Awards in January 2018.

In 2019, Nicholls was again named the Female Vocalist of the Year at the Covenant Awards.

She released her second album Pursue on November 1, 2019. Pursue was nominated for Contemporary Christian/Gospel Album of the Year at the 49th annual Juno Awards. In March 2020, at the 41st annual Covenant Awards Brooke was named the Female Vocalist of the Year, as well as won the awards for Inspirational Song of the Year for Pursue and Praise & Worship Song of the Year for Turn My Eyes, both from her Pursue album.

She is the daughter of member of provincial parliament Rick Nicholls.
