= Arthur Nelson Alles =

Canadian politician (1915–1979)

Member of the Ontario Provincial Parliament for Essex North
- In office August 4, 1943 – March 24, 1945
- Preceded by: Adélard Trottier
- Succeeded by: Alexander Parent

Personal details
- Born: October 30, 1915 Galt, Ontario
- Died: July 13, 1979 (aged 63) North Bay, Ontario, Canada
- Party: Co-operative Commonwealth Federation (1943=1944); Independent Labour (1944-1945)
- Spouse: Myrtle

Arthur Nelson Alles was a member of the Legislative Assembly of Ontario from 1943 to 1945. After graduating from Waterloo College, Alles moved to Windsor, Ontario where he found work with Ford. He was elected as the MPP for Essex North representing the Co-operative Commonwealth Federation (Ontario Section). In late 1944, he and fellow CCF MPP Leslie Hancock endorsed a proposal by A. A. MacLeod, leader of the Communist Labor-Progressive Party for a coalition between the LPP, the Liberals and the CCF to oust the Ontario Progressive Conservative Party government of George A. Drew. Hancock and Alles left the CCF caucus to sit as Independent Labour MPPs after CCF party leader Ted Jolliffe rejected the LPP proposal. Alles did not run in the 1945 Ontario general election.
