= Solomon White =

Canadian politician

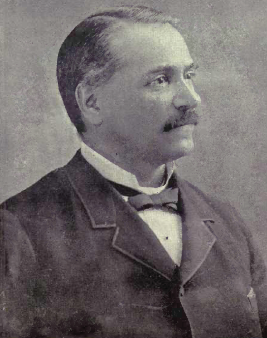

Ontario MPP
- In office 1890–1894
- Preceded by: Gaspard Pacaud
- Succeeded by: William J. McKee
- In office 1878–1886
- Preceded by: James Colebrooke Patterson
- Succeeded by: Gaspard Pacaud
- Constituency: Essex North

Personal details
- Born: October 8, 1836 Anderdon Huron Reserve, near Amherstburg, Upper Canada
- Died: November 11, 1911 (aged 75) Cobalt, Ontario
- Party: Conservative
- Spouse: Mary L. Drew (m. 1867)
- Occupation: Lawyer

Solomon White, KC (October 8, 1836 – November 11, 1911) was an Ontario lawyer and political figure. He represented Essex North in the Legislative Assembly of Ontario from 1878 to 1886 and from 1890 to 1894 as a Conservative member.

He was born on the Anderdon Huron reserve near Amherstburg, Upper Canada and was the son of Joseph White, a chief of the Wyandot, and Angélique Fortier. White was called to the bar in 1865 and entered practice at Windsor with John O'Connor, a fellow Catholic. He married Mary L. Drew in 1867. In 1868, he moved to Cooksville, where he purchased the Claire House vineyards and established a winery. White ran unsuccessfully in Peel for a seat in the provincial assembly in 1873. In 1876, he returned to Windsor where he resumed the practice of law and also operated a farm. In 1877, he and the majority of the members of the Anderdon reserve became enfranchised after a collective vote. He was first elected in an 1878 by-election held after James Colebrooke Patterson was elected to the federal parliament. White was defeated by Gaspard Pacaud in 1886 but elected again in 1890. He married Elizabeth Whitmore in 1898.

Unlike other Conservatives, White supported French language instruction in Ontario schools and annexation to the United States. He also defended native land claims in Ontario and voting rights for native peoples. White served as mayor of Windsor in 1890.

In 1905, White moved to the silver mining town of Cobalt and set up a law practice there. He was named a King's Counsel in 1908. In 1911, he was elected mayor of Cobalt but died later that year.

== Electoral history ==
Ontario provincial by-election, September 1878: Essex North Resignation of James Colebrooke Patterson
Party	Candidate	Votes	%	±%
Conservative	Solomon White	687	99.85	+38.30
Independent	Mr. Rankin	1	0.15	
Total valid votes		688		
Conservative hold		Swing		+38.30
Source: History of the Electoral Districts, Legislatures and Ministries of the Province of Ontario

1879 Ontario general election: Essex North
Party	Candidate	Votes	%	±%
Conservative	Solomon White	1,062	56.04	−43.81
Liberal	Mr. Gigniac	833	43.96	
Total valid votes		1,895	42.68	
Eligible voters		4,440		
Conservative hold		Swing		−43.81
Source: Elections Ontario
