= Edward Philip Tellier =

Canadian politician from Ontario

Member of the Ontario Provincial Parliament for Essex North
- In office June 25, 1923 – October 18, 1926
- Preceded by: Alphonse George Tisdelle
- Succeeded by: Paul Poisson

Personal details
- Party: Liberal

Edward Philip Tellier (14 August 1881 – 27 May 1932) was a Canadian politician from Ontario. He represented Essex North in the Legislative Assembly of Ontario from 1923 to 1926.

== See also ==
- 16th Parliament of Ontario
