= Rick Nicholls =

Canadian politician

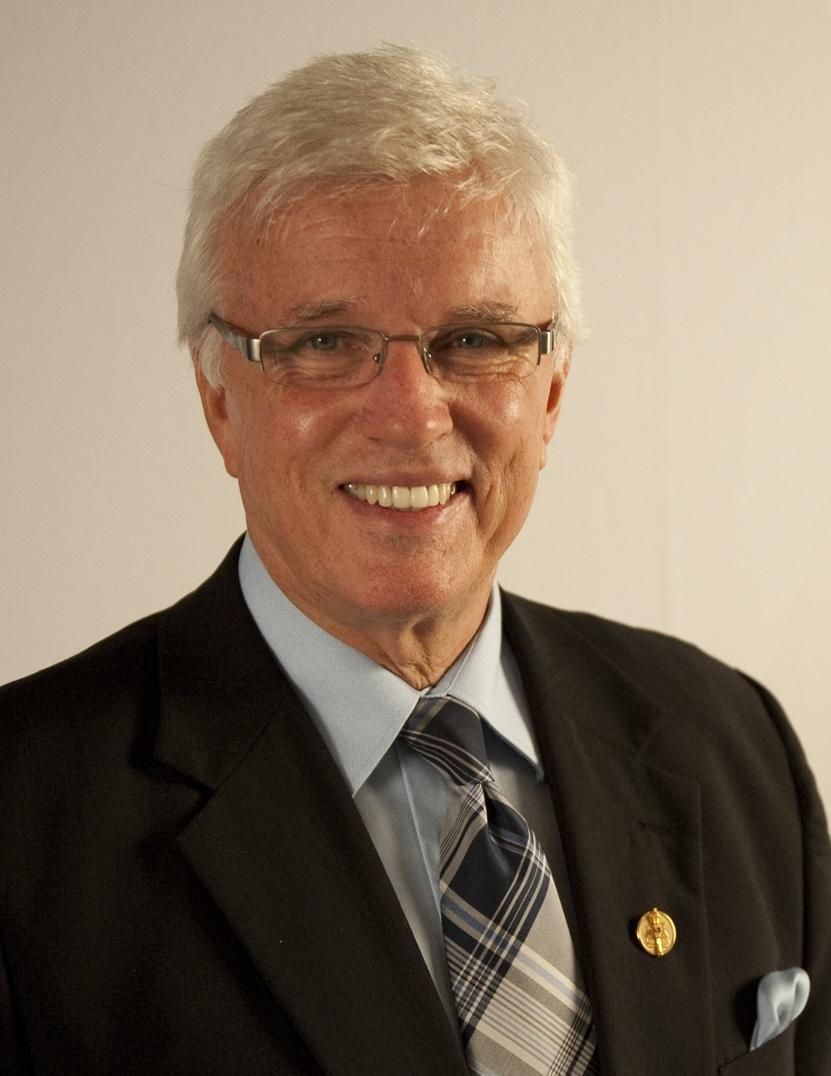
- Nicholls in 2011

Member of the Ontario Provincial Parliament for Chatham-Kent—Leamington
- In office June 7, 2018 – May 3, 2022
- Preceded by: Constituency established
- Succeeded by: Trevor Jones

Member of the Ontario Provincial Parliament for Chatham-Kent—Essex
- In office October 6, 2011 – June 7, 2018
- Preceded by: Pat Hoy
- Succeeded by: Constituency abolished

Personal details
- Born: Frederick Rumball Nicholls; October 11, 1950 (age 75) Chatham-Kent, Ontario, Canada
- Party: Ontario Party
- Other political affiliations: Progressive Conservative (2011–2021)
- Relatives: Frederick George Rumball (great-great-grandfather) Brooke Nicholls (daughter)
- Education: St. Clair College; University of Windsor

Frederick Rumball Nicholls (born October 11, 1950) is a former Canadian politician who sat in the Legislative Assembly of Ontario from 2011 to 2022. He represented the riding of Chatham-Kent—Leamington.

Nicholls was originally a member of the Progressive Conservative (PC) Party before he was removed by Doug Ford in 2021 due to refusing a vaccine. In December 2021, he joined the Ontario Party, becoming its first and only member in the legislature until losing his seat in the 2022 election.

== Background ==
Nicholls was born in Chatham-Kent, Ontario. He attended St. Clair College and the University of Windsor. His great-great-grandfather, Frederick George Rumball, was the mayor of London, Ontario from 1900 to 1901. Amongst his political heroes is former US president Ronald Reagan.

Nicholls was the founder of Nicholls Training Group, a training and development company. His clients included the Canadian Embassy to the United Nations, Canada Post and Ford Motor Company of Canada. He and his wife Dianne live in Chatham-Kent where they raised three children, including singer/songwriter Brooke Nicholls.

== Political career ==
Nicholls ran in the 2011 Ontario general election as the Progressive Conservative candidate and flipped the riding of Chatham-Kent—Essex from the Liberal Party and remained in position for 11 years.

While serving in the Official Opposition from 2011 to 2018, Nicholls served 4 years as the Opposition’s Shadow Cabinet in Community Safety and Correctional Services. In addition, he served as the Official Opposition Deputy Speaker. Since the 2018 election and until 2022, he served as the Government Deputy Speaker of the Ontario Legislative Assembly.

Nicholls is an outspoken opponent of wind turbines. Alleging health hazards of wind turbines, he has called for a moratorium on their construction.

In 2012, Nicholls called for a more thorough investigation into a massive fish kill incident along the shores of Lake Erie in early September 2012.

He was re-elected in the 2014 election. Where he was the party's critic for Tourism, Culture, and Sport as well as Community Safety and Correctional Services.

In 2015, during a debate about the province's new sexual education curriculum, Nicholls revealed that he does not believe in evolution, and he was not kidding when he said it was "not a bad idea" to stop teaching it in schools. His stance was met with criticism from other members of the PC Party.

Following the 2018 election, Nicholls served as Deputy Speaker of the House. He was also on the Caucus Advisory Teams for Corrections and Community Safety, Ministry of the Attorney General, and the Ministry of Children, Community, and Social Services.

=== Dismissal from Ontario Progressive Conservative caucus ===
Nicholls was ejected from the caucus by Premier Doug Ford on August 19, 2021, for vaccine hesitancy, against the policy made by the party. Nicholls cited personal reasons, requiring clinical studies on long-term safety before mandatory injection. On October 5, 2021, he was removed from his role as deputy speaker, and announced that he would not seek re-election when his term expires in 2022.

In December 2021, Nicholls joined the Ontario Party to become its first sitting member in the Legislative Assembly.

=== Municipal Council Campaign ===
On May 12, 2026, Nicholls officially registered as a candidate for Chatham-Kent Municipal Council in Ward 8.

== Electoral history ==
2022 Ontario general election: Chatham-Kent—Leamington
Party	Candidate	Votes	%	±%	Expenditures
Progressive Conservative	Trevor Jones	17,522	47.52	–4.40	$69,271
New Democratic	Brock McGregor	11,163	30.28	–5.43	$54,449
Ontario Party	Rick Nicholls	5,478	14.86	–37.06	$15,238
New Blue	Rhonda Jubenville	1,463	3.97	–	$18,963
Green	Jennifer Surerus	1,244	3.37	–0.17	$381
Total valid votes/expense limit		36,870	94.70	–	$121,477
Total rejected, unmarked and declined ballots		2,064	5.30	+3.93	
Turnout		38,934	44.87	–11.92	
Eligible voters		86,769			
Progressive Conservative hold		Swing		+0.52	
Source: Elections Ontario
