= Thomas Brophey =

Canadian politician (1908–1987)

Thomas R. Brophey (1908 – March 6, 1987) was a journalist, lawyer and politician in Ontario, Canada. He served as mayor of Windsor briefly in 1951.

He began work as a journalist in 1924 with the Border Cities Star and the Windsor Star. He went on to study law at Osgoode Hall Law School. Brophey served on Windsor city council from 1944 to 1945. He was city controller from 1946 to 1947. He ran unsuccessfully for mayor in 1948, losing to Arthur Reaume.

The initial ballot count for the municipal election in 1950 had Brophey defeating Reaume by 38 votes. After a recount, Reaume was declared the winner by 16 votes. By that time, Brophey had served eight days in office as mayor but was paid a month's pay. Brophey resumed his legal career.

He died in 1987 at the age of 79.
