= Philippe-Napoléon Pacaud =

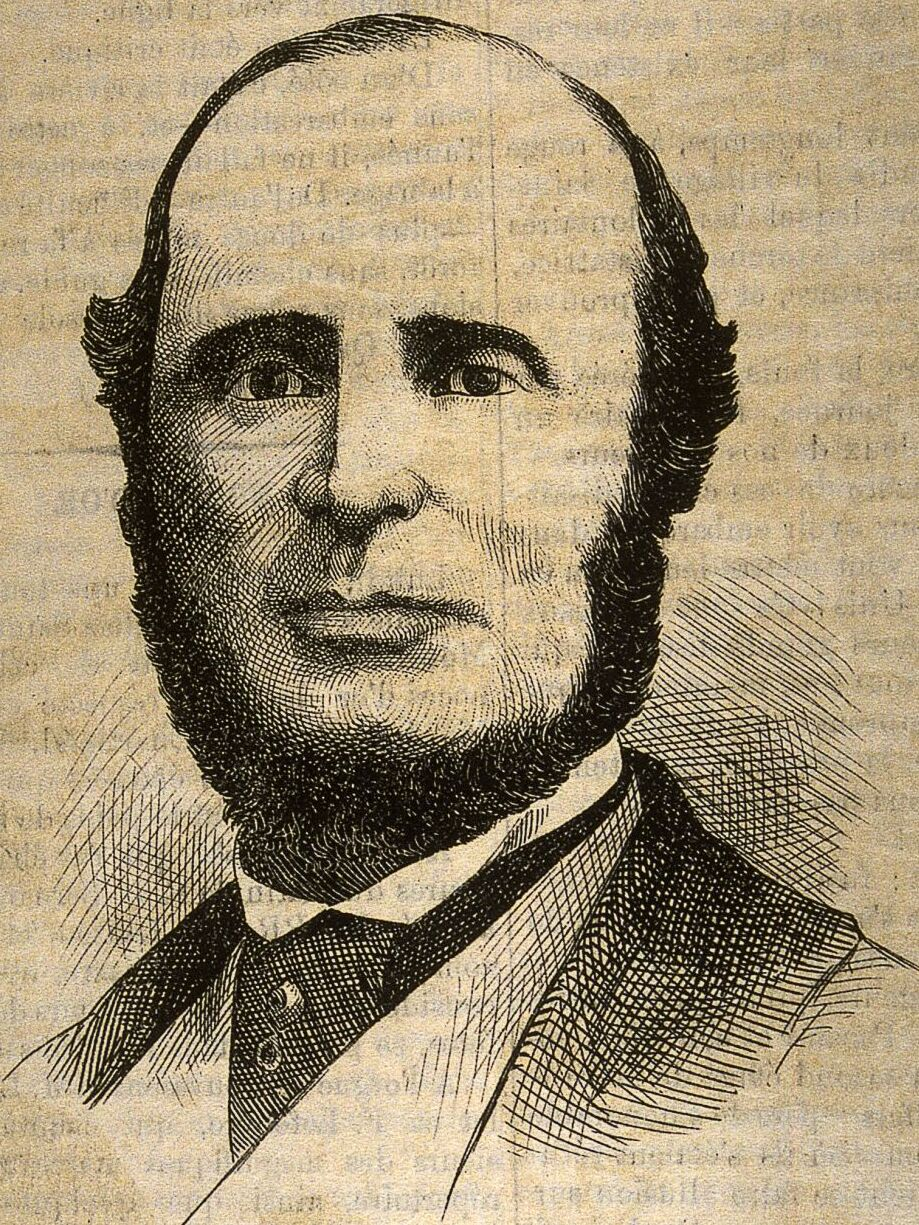
Philippe-Napoléon Pacaud

Philippe-Napoléon Pacaud (January 22, 1812 – July 27, 1884) was a Quebec notary and Patriote.

He was born in Quebec City in 1812, the son of Joseph Pacaud. He studied at the Séminaire de Nicolet, articled as a notary with Louis Panet and qualified to practice in 1833. He set up practice at Saint-Hyacinthe. In 1834, he married Julie-Aurélie Boucher de La Bruère, the sister of Pierre-Claude Boucher de la Bruère. In 1837, he helped form a chapter of Les Fils de la Liberté at Saint-Hyacinthe. After participating in earlier battles and wanted by the authorities, he attempted to escape to the United States in November of that year. When his route was blocked, he hid himself near Saint-Hyacinthe until a general amnesty was declared in June 1838.

He was arrested in December 1838 after attending a Patriote meeting and released the following January without being charged. After the death of his wife and two children, he moved to Saint-Norbert-d'Arthabaska. In 1847, he married Clarice Duval. Pacaud served as justice of the peace, captain in the local militia and local postmaster. He died at Saint-Norbert-d'Arthabaska in 1884.

His son Jean-Baptiste-Napoléon-Gaspard served in the Ontario legislative assembly and his son Philippe-Olivier-Ernest was a Quebec journalist and political organizer. His brother Édouard-Louis served in the Quebec Legislative Council.
