= Arthur Reaume =

Canadian politician (1906–1981)

Ontario MPP
- In office November 22, 1951 – October 16, 1967
- Preceded by: Gordon Bennett Ellis
- Succeeded by: Dick Ruston
- Constituency: Essex North

22nd Mayor of Windsor
- In office 1941–1954
- Preceded by: David Croll
- Succeeded by: Thomas Brophey

Personal details
- Born: November 30, 1906 Sandwich, Ontario, Canada
- Died: December 13, 1981 (aged 75) Toronto, Ontario, Canada
- Party: Ontario Liberal Party

Arthur John Reaume (November 30, 1906 – December 13, 1981) was a Canadian politician.

== Background ==
Reaume was born at Sandwich, Ontario, in 1906.

== Politics ==
He was elected to the town council of Sandwich in 1930 and became mayor of Sandwich in 1933. He sat on Windsor city council after Sandwich became part of Windsor. Reaume succeeded David Croll as Windsor mayor in 1941, becoming the 22nd mayor of the city, and was reelected in 1948. In the municipal election of 1950, it appeared that Thomas Brophey had defeated Reaume by 38 votes but, after a recount, Reaume was declared the winner by 16 votes and served until 1954. Reaume is also Windsor's longest-serving mayor, at 13 years.

He ran as a candidate for the Progressive Conservative Party of Ontario in the 1943 election but was defeated by the CCF. He broke with the Conservatives when he supported UAW workers at Ford in their fight for the Rand formula.

In the 1945 and 1948 elections, he ran as a Liberal-Labour candidate, but lost on both attempts. He was elected to the Legislative Assembly of Ontario as a Liberal Member of Provincial Parliament (MPP) in the 1951 election. He remained in office until the 1967 election.

A pro-labour but otherwise conservative politician, he ran in the 1958 Ontario Liberal leadership convention but won only 32 votes and was eliminated on the first ballot along with Liberal-Labour MPP Albert Wren. Reaume withdrew after the first ballot and threw his support to John Wintermeyer who came from behind to win on the third ballot. Reaume and Wren had both been expelled from the Liberal caucus in 1957 for attacking the leadership of Farquhar Oliver but Reaume was readmitted after apologising.

He died at a Toronto hospital in 1981.
