= Gordon Bennett Ellis =

Canadian politician from Ontario

Member of the Ontario Provincial Parliament for Essex North
- In office June 7, 1948 – October 6, 1951
- Preceded by: Alexander Parent
- Succeeded by: Arthur Reaume

Personal details
- Party: Co-operative Commonwealth

Gordon Bennett Ellis was a Canadian politician who was Co-operative Commonwealth MPP for Essex North from 1948 to 1951.

== See also ==
- 23rd Parliament of Ontario
