= Chatham-Kent—Leamington (provincial electoral district) =

Provincial electoral district in Ontario, Canada

Coordinates: 42.28°N 82.29°W

Ontario electoral district
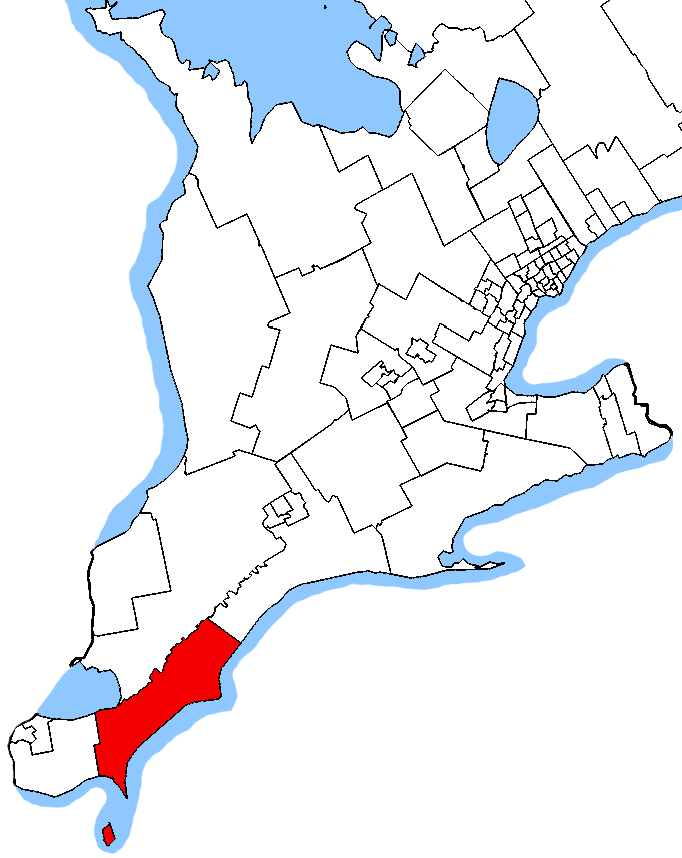
- Chatham-Kent—Leamington in relation to other southwestern Ontario electoral districts

Provincial electoral district
- Legislature: Legislative Assembly of Ontario
MPP
Trevor Jones
Progressive Conservative
- District created: 1999
- First contested: 1999
- Last contested: 2025

Demographics
- Population (2016): 109,620
- Electors (2018): 82,799
- Area (km²): 3,036
- Pop. density (per km²): 36.1
- Census division(s): Chatham-Kent, Essex County,
- Census subdivision(s): Chatham-Kent, Lakeshore Leamington

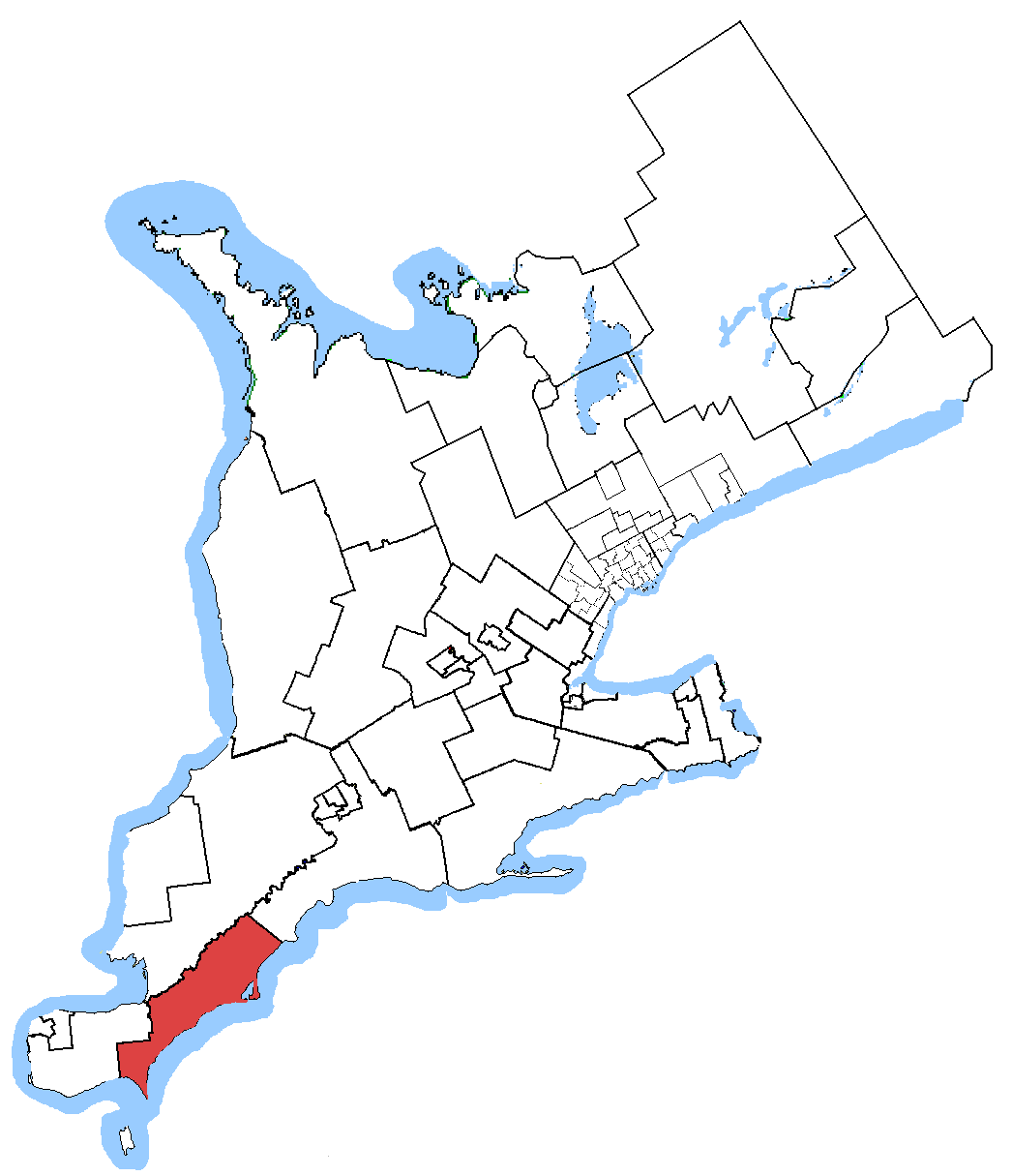
Chatham-Kent-Essex 2003 to 2018

Chatham-Kent—Leamington (formerly Chatham-Kent—Essex and Chatham—Kent Essex) is a provincial electoral district in southwestern, Ontario, Canada. It elects one member to the Legislative Assembly of Ontario.

It was created in 1999 from parts of Essex—Kent, Chatham-Kent and Essex South.

When the riding was created, it included all of Kent County south of the Thames River, the city of Chatham, the town of Leamington and the Township of Mersea Township.

In 2007, the boundaries did not change.

As a result of the 2012 federal boundary redistricting, the name of the district was changed to Chatham-Kent—Leamington.

== Members of Provincial Parliament ==
This riding has elected the following members of the Legislative Assembly of Ontario:

| Assembly | Years | Member | Party |
|---|---|---|---|
Chatham-Kent—Essex; Riding created from Essex—Kent, Chatham—Kent and Essex South
| 37th | 1999–2003 | Pat Hoy | Liberal |
| 38th | 2003–2007 | Pat Hoy | Liberal |
| 39th | 2007–2011 | Pat Hoy | Liberal |
| 40th | 2011–2014 | Rick Nicholls | Progressive Conservative |
| 41st | 2014–2018 | Rick Nicholls | Progressive Conservative |
Chatham-Kent—Leamington
| 42nd | 2018–2021 | Rick Nicholls | Progressive Conservative |
| 42nd | 2021–2021 | Rick Nicholls | Independent |
| 42nd | 2021–2022 | Rick Nicholls | Ontario Party |
| 43rd | 2022–present | Trevor Jones | Progressive Conservative |

== Election results ==
Winning party in each polling division of Chatham-Kent—Leamington at the 2025 Ontario general election

2025 Ontario general election
| Party | Candidate | Votes | % | ±% | Expenditures |
|---|---|---|---|---|---|
| Progressive Conservative | Trevor Jones | 22,255 | 52.03 | +4.50 | $51,184 |
| Liberal | Bill Kirby | 7,856 | 18.37 | – | $5,429 |
| New Democratic | Christian Sachs | 7,333 | 17.14 | –13.13 | $21,526 |
| New Blue | Rhonda Jubenville | 3,387 | 7.92 | +3.95 | $30,394 |
| Green | Matthew Davey | 1,241 | 2.90 | –0.47 | $0 |
| Ontario Party | Phillip St-Laurent | 704 | 1.65 | –13.21 | $965 |
| Total valid votes/expense limit | | 42,776 | 99.11 | – | $143,786 |
| Total rejected, unmarked and declined ballots | | 384 | 0.89 | –4.41 | |
| Turnout | | 43,160 | 48.33 | +3.46 | |
| Eligible voters | | 89,308 | | | |
| Progressive Conservative hold | | Swing | | +2.25 | |
Source: Elections Ontario

Winning party in each polling division of Chatham-Kent—Leamington at the 2022 Ontario general election

2022 Ontario general election
| Party | Candidate | Votes | % | ±% | Expenditures |
|---|---|---|---|---|---|
| Progressive Conservative | Trevor Jones | 17,522 | 47.52 | –4.40 | $69,271 |
| New Democratic | Brock McGregor | 11,163 | 30.28 | –5.43 | $54,449 |
| Ontario Party | Rick Nicholls | 5,478 | 14.86 | –37.06 | $15,238 |
| New Blue | Rhonda Jubenville | 1,463 | 3.97 | – | $18,963 |
| Green | Jennifer Surerus | 1,244 | 3.37 | –0.17 | $381 |
| Total valid votes/expense limit | | 36,870 | 94.70 | – | $121,477 |
| Total rejected, unmarked and declined ballots | | 2,064 | 5.30 | +3.93 | |
| Turnout | | 38,934 | 44.87 | –11.92 | |
| Eligible voters | | 86,769 | | | |
| Progressive Conservative hold | | Swing | | +0.52 | |
Source: Elections Ontario

2018 Ontario general election
| Party | Candidate | Votes | % | ±% |
|---|---|---|---|---|
| Progressive Conservative | Rick Nicholls | 24,078 | 51.92 | +14.09 |
| New Democratic | Jordan McGrail | 16,558 | 35.71 | +4.59 |
| Liberal | Margaret Schleier Stahl | 3,736 | 8.06 | –16.37 |
| Green | Mark Vercouteren | 1,643 | 3.54 | –1.71 |
| Independent | Drew Barry John Simpson | 358 | 0.77 | – |
| Total valid votes | | 46,373 | 98.62 | |
| Total rejected, unmarked and declined ballots | | 647 | 1.38 | –0.66 |
| Turnout | | 47,020 | 56.79 | +5.46 |
| Eligible voters | | 82,799 | | |
| Progressive Conservative hold | | Swing | | +4.75 |
Source: Elections Ontario

2014 Ontario general election: Chatham-Kent—Essex
| Party | Candidate | Votes | % | ±% |
|---|---|---|---|---|
| Progressive Conservative | Rick Nicholls | 14,183 | 37.83 | –3.95 |
| New Democratic | Dan Gelinas | 11,664 | 31.11 | +7.86 |
| Liberal | Terry Johnson | 9,158 | 24.43 | –7.71 |
| Green | Ken Bell | 1,971 | 5.26 | +2.42 |
| Libertarian | Douglas McLarty | 514 | 1.37 | – |
| Total valid votes | | 37,490 | 97.96 | |
| Total rejected, unmarked and declined ballots | | 779 | 2.04 | +1.40 |
| Turnout | | 38,269 | 51.33 | +1.92 |
| Eligible voters | | 74,559 | | |
| Progressive Conservative hold | | Swing | | –5.90 |
Source: Elections Ontario

2011 Ontario general election: Chatham-Kent—Essex
| Party | Candidate | Votes | % | ±% |
|---|---|---|---|---|
| Progressive Conservative | Rick Nicholls | 15,121 | 41.78 | +13.08 |
| Liberal | Paul Watson | 11,631 | 32.14 | –19.85 |
| New Democratic | Aleksandra Navarro | 8,415 | 23.25 | +10.52 |
| Green | Holly Sullivan | 1,027 | 2.84 | –2.85 |
| Total valid votes | | 36,194 | 99.36 | |
| Total rejected, unmarked and declined ballots | | 233 | 0.64 | –0.35 |
| Turnout | | 36,427 | 49.41 | +0.60 |
| Eligible voters | | 73,727 | | |
| Progressive Conservative gain from Liberal | | Swing | | +16.47 |
Source: Elections Ontario

2007 Ontario general election: Chatham-Kent—Essex
| Party | Candidate | Votes | % | ±% |
|---|---|---|---|---|
| Liberal | Pat Hoy | 18,782 | 51.98 | –7.27 |
| Progressive Conservative | Doug Jackson | 10,367 | 28.69 | –1.13 |
| New Democratic | Murray Gaudreau | 4,601 | 12.73 | +5.29 |
| Green | Ken Bell | 2,054 | 5.69 | +2.93 |
| Family Coalition | Mark Morin | 326 | 0.90 | – |
| Total valid votes | | 36,130 | 99.01 | |
| Total rejected, unmarked and declined ballots | | 361 | 0.99 | +0.31 |
| Turnout | | 36,491 | 48.81 | –6.83 |
| Eligible voters | | 74,764 | | |
| Liberal hold | | Swing | | –3.07 |
Source: Elections Ontario

2003 Ontario general election: Chatham-Kent Essex
| Party | Candidate | Votes | % | ±% |
|---|---|---|---|---|
| Liberal | Pat Hoy | 23,022 | 59.26 | +3.22 |
| Progressive Conservative | Dave Wilkinson | 11,586 | 29.82 | –7.72 |
| New Democratic | Derry McKeever | 2,893 | 7.45 | +2.09 |
| Green | Jim Burgess | 1,069 | 2.75 | +1.68 |
| Freedom | David Rodman | 281 | 0.72 | – |
| Total valid votes | | 38,851 | 99.32 | |
| Total rejected, unmarked and declined ballots | | 266 | 0.68 | –0.59 |
| Turnout | | 39,117 | 55.64 | –3.16 |
| Eligible voters | | 70,306 | | |
| Liberal hold | | Swing | | +5.47 |
Source: Elections Ontario

1999 Ontario general election: Chatham-Kent Essex
| Party | Candidate | Votes | % |
|---|---|---|---|
| Liberal | Pat Hoy | 24,239 | 56.04 |
| Progressive Conservative | Jack Carroll | 16,238 | 37.54 |
| New Democratic | Brian Sharp | 2,316 | 5.35 |
| Green | Greg Zolad | 462 | 1.07 |
| Total valid votes | | 43,255 | 98.73 |
| Total rejected, unmarked and declined ballots | | 558 | 1.27 |
| Turnout | | 43,813 | 58.80 |
| Eligible voters | | 74,515 | |
| Liberal pickup new district. | | | |
Source: Elections Ontario

== 2007 electoral reform referendum ==
2007 Ontario electoral reform referendum
| Side | Votes | % |
|---|---|---|
| First Past the Post | 24,235 | 69.3 |
| Mixed member proportional | 10,734 | 30.7 |
| Total valid votes | 34,969 | 100.0 |

== See also ==
- List of Ontario provincial electoral districts
- Canadian provincial electoral districts
