= William J. McKee =

Canadian politician

Ontario MPP
- In office 1894–1902
- Preceded by: Solomon White
- Succeeded by: Joseph Octave Reaume
- Constituency: Essex North

Personal details
- Born: December 10, 1850 Sandwich, Ontario
- Died: June 30, 1929 (aged 78) Windsor, Ontario
- Party: Liberal
- Spouse: Mary Baby (m. 1873)
- Occupation: Merchant

William Johnston McKee (December 10, 1850 – June 30, 1929) was a Canadian merchant and political figure in Ontario. He represented Essex North in the Legislative Assembly of Ontario from 1894 to 1902 as a Liberal member.

He was born in Sandwich (later Windsor) in Essex County, Canada West, the son of Thomas McKee Jr. and grandson of Thomas McKee. McKee was a lumber dealer and also manufactured doors and other wood products. In 1873, he married Mary Baby, the granddaughter of James Baby (baptized Jacques). McKee served on the council for Essex County and the city council for Windsor. He also was chairman for the Windsor Board of Water Commissioners. He died at Sandwich in 1929.
