= Joseph Octave Reaume =

Canadian politician

Ontario MPP
- In office 1902–1914
- Preceded by: William J. McKee
- Succeeded by: Severin Ducharme
- Constituency: Essex North

Personal details
- Born: August 13, 1856 Anderdon Township, Essex County, Canada West
- Died: June 12, 1933 (aged 76) Sandwich, Ontario
- Party: Conservative
- Spouse: Catherine Turner (m. 1887)
- Occupation: Physician

Joseph Octave Reaume (August 13, 1856 – June 12, 1933) was an Ontario physician and political figure. He represented Essex North in the Legislative Assembly of Ontario from 1902 to 1914 as a Conservative member.

He was born in Anderdon Township, Essex County, Canada West, the son of farmer Oliver Reaume, and received his teacher's certificate in 1873. He taught school and pursued further studies in Toronto and Sandwich (later Windsor). He went on to study medicine at the Detroit College of Medicine and Trinity College, setting up practice in Windsor. He married Catherine Turner in 1887.

He served as Minister of Public Works (initially titled "Commissioner") from 1905 to 1914. As the only francophone in the Whitney ministry when it imposed Regulation 17, which effectively placed severe restrictions on all French instruction in the province's bilingual elementary schools following the Merchant Report in 1912, Reaume had the unenviable task of defending the government's policy and its subsequent modifications in Regulation 18 which allowed for one hour of French instruction per day in the previously bilingual schools. Reaume argued that many Franco-Ontarian parents actually wished that their children would receive a first class education in English in order to access better paying jobs. Nevertheless, many Franco-Ontarian parents, children and teachers protested this new policy by marching out of their classrooms upon the arrival of the ministry appointed school inspectors. Reaume subsequently paid the price, when voters in the riding of Windsor voted against him in 1914, electing his Liberal opponent.

Reaume has often been mistakenly identified as the first francophone cabinet member in the Government of Ontario due to errorneous reporting upon his 1933 death. His ministry tenure actually followed that of Alfred Évanturel who served as a minister without portfolio in the final three months of the predecessor Liberal Ross ministry.

He died at Sandwich, Ontario in 1933.
