= Patrick Michael Hayes =

Canadian politician

Pat Hayes

Mayor of Lakeshore, Ontario
- In office 1997–2003

Ontario MPP
- In office 1990–1995
- Preceded by: New riding
- Succeeded by: Pat Hoy
- Constituency: Essex—Kent
- In office 1985–1987
- Preceded by: Dick Ruston
- Succeeded by: Riding abolished
- Constituency: Essex North

Personal details
- Born: Patrick Michael Hayes; October 26, 1942 Maidstone Township, Ontario, Canada
- Died: May 2, 2011 (aged 68) Essex County, Ontario, Canada
- Political party: New Democrat
- Spouse: Rose Claire Hayes
- Children: 5
- Occupation: Health and safety coordinator

Patrick "Pat" Michael Hayes (October 26, 1942 - May 2, 2011) was a politician in Ontario, Canada. He served as a New Democratic member of the Legislative Assembly of Ontario from 1985 to 1987, and again from 1990 to 1995.

== Background ==
Hayes was born in Maidstone Township, Ontario. He was the 13th child in a family of 18 children. He did not complete high school, instead he got a job at Ford Motors. Hayes reflected on his early life choices. He said, "When I was a teenager it was one of those cases where if you wanted a new pair of pants, or shoes, you had to go to work for them." By the time he was 25 he was plant health and safety representative for the Canadian Auto Workers. He lived in Essex County, Ontario where he and his wife Rose Claire raised five children.

== Provincial politics ==
Hayes was elected to the Ontario legislature in the 1985 provincial election, defeating Liberal candidate Jack Morris by about 1,300 votes in Essex North. He served as the NDP critic for Transportation and Communications, Tourism and Recreation, and Agriculture in the parliament that followed.

The Liberals won a landslide majority in the 1987 provincial election, and Hayes his seat lost to Liberal MPP Jim McGuigan, by 1,063 votes in the redistributed riding of Essex—Kent. He ran against McGuigan again in the 1990 election, this time defeating him by 5,890 votes amid a provincial victory for the NDP under Bob Rae. He served as Parliamentary Assistant to the Minister of Agriculture and Food from 1990 to 1993, and to the Minister of Municipal Affairs from 1993 to 1995.

In 1994, Hayes was one of twelve NDP members to vote against Bill 167, a bill extending financial benefits to same-sex partners. Premier Bob Rae allowed a free vote on the bill which allowed members of his party to vote with their conscience. By the 2003 campaign, he had changed his mind on this issue.

The NDP were defeated in the 1995 provincial election, and Hayes finished third, 2,293 votes behind the winning candidate, Liberal Pat Hoy. He sought a return to the legislature in the 2003 provincial election, but, although he was generally seen as a strong candidate, he lost to Liberal incumbent Bruce Crozier by about 8,000 votes in the riding of Essex.

== Municipal politics ==
Hayes was mayor of Lakeshore, Ontario from 1997 to 2003, and was generally regarded as a popular figure within that community. He managed the campaign of Taras Natyshak, a family friend and NDP candidate in Essex in the 2006 and 2008 federal elections.

== Later life ==
Hayes died 2011 after a long illness with lung cancer. He is buried in St. Mary`s Roman Catholic Cemetery in Essex County, Ontario.
