= Frederick Rumball =

Canadian politician

Frederick George Rumball (December 8, 1853 – October 1, 1940) was a Canadian lumber merchant and politician in Ontario, Canada. He served as mayor of London, Ontario from 1900 to 1901.

The son of Benjamin Rumball and Mary Johnson, both natives of England, he was born in Clinton, Huron County, Canada West. Rumball was educated there and apprenticed as a carpenter, later working as a general contractor and then entering the lumber business. He moved to London in 1881. Rumball was president of the Columbia Handle Company, the Southwestern Traction Company, the Monarch Fire Insurance Company of Canada and the Hourde Manufacturing Company. He was first elected to London city council in 1897, serving for two years. He was an unsuccessful candidate for the London seat in the Ontario Legislative Assembly in 1905.

Rumball was married twice: first to Agnes Aikenhead in 1878 and then to A. A. Perdue in 1902.

Rumball died in London at the Victoria Hospital at the age of 86.

His great-great-grandson is Rick Nicholls, a politician for the provincial riding of Chatham-Kent—Leamington (formerly Chatham-Kent-Essex), who was first elected in 2011 with the PC Party of Ontario and later served as the Deputy Speaker of the Ontario Legislative Assembly from June 2018 – 2021. On August 19,2021, Nicholls was removed from the PC caucus for his refusal to get the "jab" based on his personal stance against the Covid-19 vaccine which was based on factual data he received from the UK. Initially, Nicholls sat as an Independent member during which he continually questioned the Minister of Health as to the efficacy of the Covid-19 shots. He joined the Ontario Party later in 2021 and became the first sitting member of that party until the June 2022 provincial election where he was defeated.
