= Severin Ducharme =

Canadian politician

Ontario MPP
- In office 1914–1919
- Preceded by: Joseph Octave Reaume
- Succeeded by: Alphonse George Tisdelle
- Constituency: Essex North

Personal details
- Born: November 26, 1866 Joliette County, Canada East
- Died: December 30, 1952 (aged 86)
- Party: Liberal
- Spouse: Marie Mousseau (m. 1891)
- Occupation: Real estate agent

Severin Ducharme (November 26, 1866 – December 30, 1952) was an Ontario real estate and insurance agent and political figure. He represented Essex North in the Legislative Assembly of Ontario as a Liberal member from 1914 to 1919.

He was born in Joliette County,(at St Felix de Valois?) Canada East, the son of Pierre Ducharme, and came to Belle River, Rochester Township in Essex County, Ontario with his family in 1874. Ducharme taught school in Belle River for two years. He then went to Montana, where he worked as a book keeper at a lumber mill for four years before returning to Belle River. After teaching for seven more years, he bought a farm. Ducharme married Marie Mousseau in 1891. In 1895, he became clerk for the township. He qualified to practice as a notary public and, in 1902, was named a justice of the peace. He was named clerk in a division court for Essex County in 1906. He was also an auctioneer. Ducharme served as secretary and treasurer for the local separate school board. He died December 30, 1952.
