= Nicolet Seminary =

College in Nicolet, Quebec, Canada

Coordinates: 46.2289°N 72.6168°W

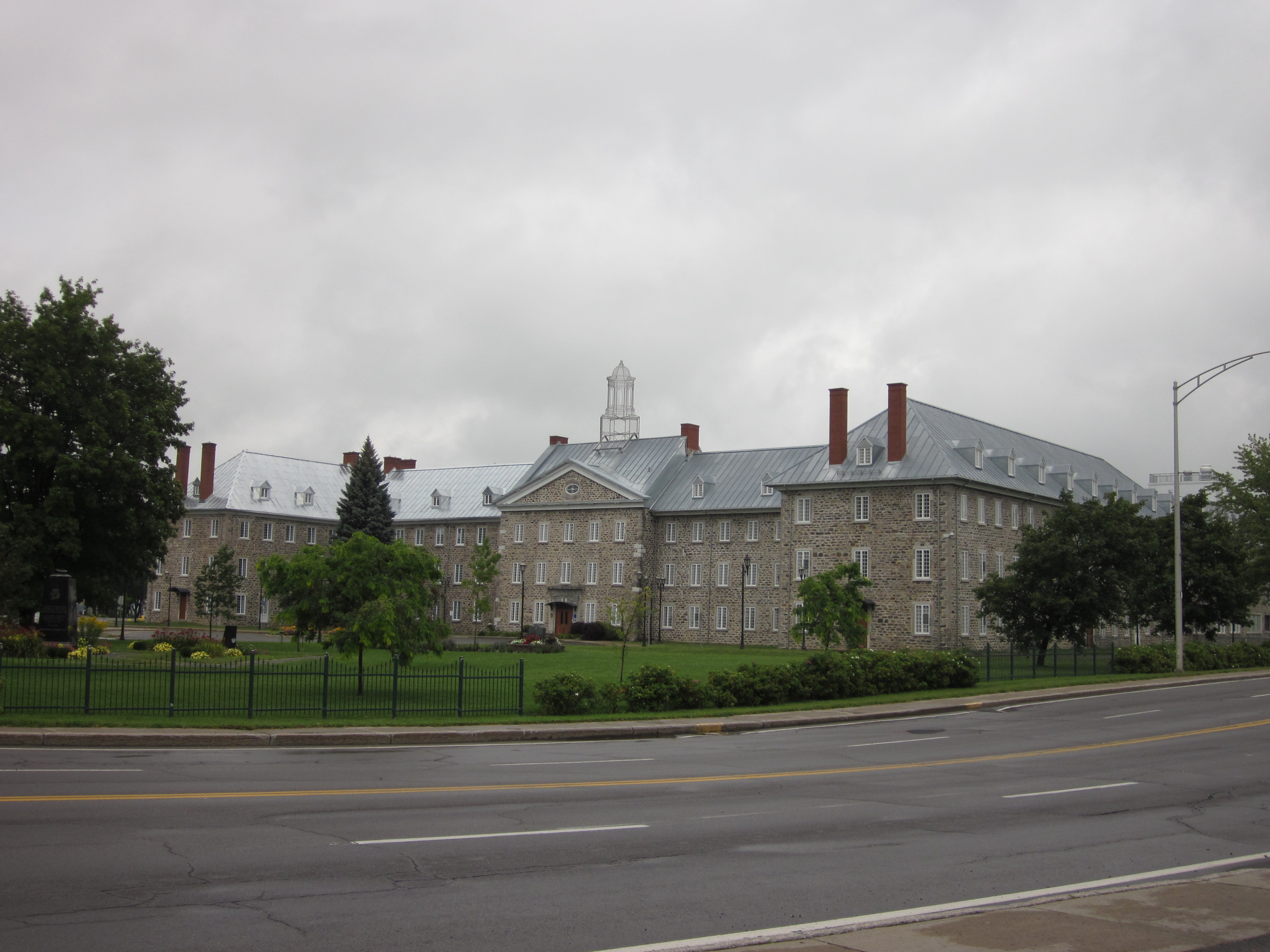
Former school building of the Collège de Nicolet

The Nicolet Seminary College (French: Séminaire de Nicolet) was a school in what is now Quebec. Founded in 1803 at the town of Nicolet, Lower Canada, it was the third institution providing a classical education in the province.

From 1826, the building of the Séminaire de Nicolet was planned by Jérôme Demers, working with architect Thomas Baillairgé.

The school closed in 1863.

== Notable alumni ==
- Philippe-Ignace François Aubert de Gaspé (1786–1871), writer and lawyer
- Joseph-Guillaume Barthe (1816–1893), writer, journalist, member of the Legislative Assembly of the Province of Canada
- Étienne Parent (1802–1874), writer, journalist, member of the Legislative Assembly of the Province of Canada
- Joseph-Édouard Turcotte (1808–1864), lawyer, journalist, member of the Legislative Assembly of the Province of Canada
- Louis-Zéphirin Moreau (1824-1901), Bishop and Blessed.
