= Édouard-Louis Pacaud =

Canadian politician (1815–1889)

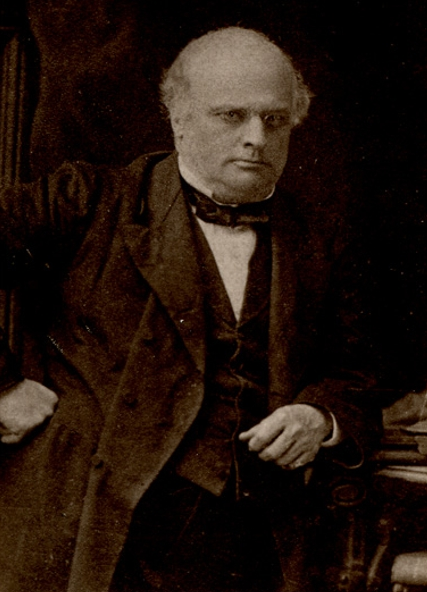

Member of the Legislative Council of Quebec for Kennebec
- In office 1887–1889
- Preceded by: Elzéar Gérin
- Succeeded by: Napoléon-Charles Cormier

Personal details
- Born: January 20, 1815 Batiscan, Lower Canada
- Died: November 18, 1889 (aged 74) Arthabaskaville, Arthabaska, Quebec, Canada
- Party: Liberal
- Relations: Morgan Laurier

Édouard-Louis Pacaud, QC (January 20, 1815 – November 18, 1889) was a Quebec lawyer and political figure. He represented Kennebec division in the Legislative Council of Quebec from 1887 to 1889.

He was born in Bastican, Lower Canada in 1815, the son of Joseph Pacaud. Pacaud was educated at the Séminaire de Nicolet, then studied law with Antoine Polette at Trois-Rivières, was admitted to the bar in 1836 and set up practice there. He did not take part in the Lower Canada Rebellion although he did win the release of Louis-Joseph Papineau's brother André-Augustin. In 1841, he married Anne-Hermine Dumoulin, the daughter of merchant Charles-Julien Dumoulin. Pacaud was bankruptcy commissioner for Trois-Rivières district from 1844 to 1850, which also required him to preside at the Court of Quarter Sessions and to serve as justice of the peace. Pacaud acquired much property in the region. He moved his practice to Montreal in 1850 but returned to Trois-Rivières around 1854.

Pacaud ran unsuccessfully for a seat in the Legislative Assembly for the Province of Canada in Mégantic in an 1850 by-election and in Nicolet in 1851. His platform included the abolition of the Legislative Council and the abolition of seigneurial tenure. In 1858, he partnered with Louis-Adélard Senécal and Sévère Dumoulin in the Compagnie de Navigation de Trois-Rivières.

Around 1861, he moved to Arthabaska. He acquired additional property in the region and served on the municipal council. In 1868, he married Françoise Dumoulin, the daughter of Pierre-Benjamin Dumoulin and the sister of Sévère Dumoulin. In 1878, he was named Queen's Counsel. He served as bâtonnier for the Arthabaska bar from 1884 and 1887 and bâtonnier for the province from 1885 to 1886.

He was named to the Legislative Council in 1887 and died in office at Arthabaska in 1889.

His daughter Angélique-Élisabeth-Hermine married Louis-Bonaventure Caron. His sister Louise-Adélaïde married Joseph-Guillaume Barthe. Pacaud was the uncle of Gaspard Pacaud who served in the Ontario legislative assembly and the great-uncle of Lucien Turcotte Pacaud who served in the Canadian House of Commons. His nephew, Eduouard-Louis Pacaud, a noted lawyer and son to his sister Emilie Barthe, was long rumored to in fact be the son of Canadian Prime Minister Wilfrid Laurier.
