= Essex North (provincial electoral district) =

Ontario electoral district

Defunct provincial electoral district
- Legislature: Legislative Assembly of Ontario
- District created: 1875
- District abolished: 1996
- First contested: 1875
- Last contested: 1995

Essex North was an electoral riding in Ontario, Canada. It was created in 1875 when the riding of Essex was split into Essex North and Essex South. It was renamed in 1967 to Essex-Kent before changing back to Essex North in 1975. It was changed back to Essex-Kent again in 1987 and finally was abolished in 1996 before the 1999 election.

== Members of Provincial Parliament ==
Essex North
Assembly	Years	Member	Party
Riding created from Essex in 1875
3rd	1875–1879	James Colebrooke Patterson	Conservative
3rd	1878–1879	Solomon White	Conservative
4th	1879–1883	Solomon White	Conservative
5th	1883–1886	Solomon White	Conservative
6th	1886–1890	Gaspard Pacaud	Liberal
7th	1890–1894	Solomon White	Conservative
8th	1894–1898	William J. McKee	Liberal
9th	1898–1902	William J. McKee	Liberal
10th	1902–1905	Joseph Octave Reaume	Conservative
11th	1905–1908	Joseph Octave Reaume	Conservative
12th	1908–1911	Joseph Octave Reaume	Conservative
13th	1911–1914	Joseph Octave Reaume	Conservative
14th	1914–1919	Severin Ducharme	Liberal
15th	1919–1923	Alphonse George Tisdelle	United Farmers
16th	1923–1926	Edward Philip Tellier	Liberal
17th	1926–1929	Paul Poisson	Conservative
18th	1929–1934	Paul Poisson	Conservative
19th	1934–1937	Adélard Trottier	Liberal
20th	1937–1943	Adélard Trottier	Liberal
21st	1943–1945	Arthur Nelson Alles	Co-operative Commonwealth
22nd	1945–1948	Alexander Parent	Liberal–Labour
23rd	1948–1951	Gordon Bennett Ellis	Co-operative Commonwealth
24th	1951–1955	Arthur Reaume	Liberal
25th	1955–1959	Arthur Reaume	Liberal
26th	1959–1963	Arthur Reaume	Liberal
27th	1963–1967	Arthur Reaume	Liberal
Renamed to Essex—Kent
28th	1967–1971	Dick Ruston	Liberal
29th	1971–1975	Dick Ruston	Liberal
Renamed to Essex North
30th	1975–1977	Dick Ruston	Liberal
31st	1977–1981	Dick Ruston	Liberal
32nd	1981–1985	Dick Ruston	Liberal
33rd	1985–1987	Pat Hayes	New Democratic
Renamed to Essex—Kent
34th	1987–1990	Jim McGuigan	Liberal
35th	1990–1995	Pat Hayes	New Democratic
36th	1995–1999	Pat Hoy	Liberal
Sourced from the Ontario Legislative Assembly
Merged into Essex riding before the 1999 election

== Election results ==
=== Essex—Kent (1987–1999) ===
1995 Ontario general election: Essex—Kent
Party	Candidate	Votes	%	±%
Liberal	Pat Hoy	10,130	37.01	+3.91
Progressive Conservative	George Kennedy	8,384	30.63	+21.53
New Democratic	Patrick Michael Hayes	7,837	28.63	–24.03
Family Coalition	Steve Posthumus	1,022	3.73	–1.42
Total valid votes		27,373	98.97	
Total rejected, unmarked and declined ballots		286	1.03	+0.23
Turnout		27,659	58.85	–8.67
Eligible voters		47,000		
Liberal gain from New Democratic		Swing		+13.97
Source: Elections Ontario

1990 Ontario general election: Essex—Kent
Party	Candidate	Votes	%	±%
New Democratic	Patrick Michael Hayes	15,858	52.66	+11.67
Liberal	Jim McGuigan	9,968	33.10	–11.68
Progressive Conservative	Claire Atkinson	2,739	9.09	–0.75
Family Coalition	Tim McGuire	1,551	5.15	+0.76
Total valid votes		30,116	99.20	
Total rejected, unmarked and declined ballots		244	0.80	+0.24
Turnout		30,360	67.52	+2.28
Eligible voters		44,964		
New Democratic gain from Liberal		Swing		+11.68
Source: Elections Ontario

1987 Ontario general election: Essex—Kent
Party	Candidate	Votes	%	±%
Liberal	Jim McGuigan	12,541	44.78	–
New Democratic	Patrick Michael Hayes	11,478	40.98	–
Progressive Conservative	John Ashton	2,758	9.85	–
Family Coalition	Tim McGuire	1,229	4.39	–
Total valid votes		28,006	99.44	
Total rejected ballots		159	0.56	–
Turnout		28,165	65.24	–
Eligible voters		43,173		
Liberal notional gain from New Democratic		Swing		–
Source: Elections Ontario

=== Essex North (1975–1987) ===
1985 Ontario general election
Party	Candidate	Votes	%	±%
New Democratic	Patrick Michael Hayes	7,901	33.56	+3.87
Liberal	Jack Morris	6,615	28.09	–18.05
Progressive Conservative	Jack Menard	6,105	25.93	+1.76
Independent	Ray Boggs	2,925	12.42	–
Total valid votes		23,546	99.48	
Total rejected ballots		124	0.52	+0.23
Turnout		23,670	61.28	+6.88
Eligible voters		38,624		
New Democratic gain from Liberal		Swing		+10.96
Source: Elections Ontario

1981 Ontario general election
Party	Candidate	Votes	%	±%
Liberal	Dick Ruston	9,187	46.14	–5.04
New Democratic	Marcel F. Lefebvre	5,911	29.69	+3.76
Progressive Conservative	Ron Arkell	4,812	24.17	+1.28
Total valid votes		19,910	99.70	
Total rejected ballots		59	0.30	–0.16
Turnout		19,969	54.41	–2.27
Eligible voters		36,704		
Liberal hold		Swing		–4.40
Source: Elections Ontario

1977 Ontario general election
Party	Candidate	Votes	%	±%
Liberal	Dick Ruston	9,801	51.19	+7.13
New Democratic	Dave Bradley	4,964	25.92	–9.49
Progressive Conservative	Marcel Desjardins	4,383	22.89	+2.36
Total valid votes		19,148	99.54	
Total rejected ballots		88	0.46	+0.20
Turnout		19,236	56.68	–10.85
Eligible voters		33,938		
Liberal hold		Swing		+8.31
Source: Elections Ontario

1975 Ontario general election
Party	Candidate	Votes	%	±%
Liberal	Dick Ruston	9,550	44.05	–
New Democratic	Lucien Lacasse	7,678	35.42	–
Progressive Conservative	Fred Cada	4,451	20.53	–
Total valid votes		21,679	99.74	
Total rejected ballots		56	0.26	–
Turnout		21,735	67.53	–
Eligible voters		32,187		
Liberal notional hold		Swing		–
Source: Elections Ontario

=== Essex—Kent (1967–1975) ===
1971 Ontario general election: Essex—Kent
Party	Candidate	Votes	%	±%
Liberal	Dick Ruston	7,087	40.30	–7.18
New Democratic	Joe Young	6,052	34.42	+21.31
Progressive Conservative	Thomas L. Docherty	4,446	25.28	–14.13
Total valid votes		17,585	99.56	
Total rejected ballots		77	0.44	–0.32
Turnout		17,662	75.52	+9.16
Eligible voters		23,387		
Liberal hold		Swing		–14.25
Source: Elections Ontario

1967 Ontario general election: Essex—Kent
Party	Candidate	Votes	%	±%
Liberal	Dick Ruston	5,829	47.48	–
Progressive Conservative	Fred Cada	4,838	39.41	–
New Democratic	Vic McMurren	1,609	13.11	–
Total valid votes		12,276	99.25	
Total rejected ballots		93	0.75	–
Turnout		12,369	66.36	–
Eligible voters		18,640		
Liberal notional hold		Swing		–
Source: Elections Ontario

=== Essex (1875–1967) ===
1963 Ontario general election
Party	Candidate	Votes	%	±%
Liberal	Arthur Reaume	14,453	45.73	+3.73
Progressive Conservative	Gordon R. Stewart	10,647	33.69	+3.82
New Democratic	Fred Burr	6,505	20.58	–7.55
Total valid votes		31,605	99.99	
Total rejected ballots		2	0.01	–1.28
Turnout		31,607	68.26	+1.35
Eligible voters		46,306		
Liberal hold		Swing		–0.04
Source: Elections Ontario

1959 Ontario general election
Party	Candidate	Votes	%	±%
Liberal	Arthur Reaume	12,412	42.00	+3.21
Progressive Conservative	Sidney Arbour	8,828	29.87	–6.45
Co-operative Commonwealth	Fred Burr	8,313	28.13	+3.24
Total valid votes		29,553	98.72	
Total rejected ballots		384	1.28	–0.40
Turnout		29,937	66.91	+0.61
Eligible voters		44,744		
Liberal hold		Swing		+4.83
Source: Elections Ontario

1955 Ontario general election
Party	Candidate	Votes	%	±%
Liberal	Arthur Reaume	10,200	38.79	–1.06
Progressive Conservative	Sidney Arbour	9,551	36.32	+5.36
Co-operative Commonwealth	Fred Burr	6,546	24.89	–4.30
Total valid votes		26,297	98.31	
Total rejected ballots		451	1.69	+0.19
Turnout		26,748	66.30	–3.71
Eligible voters		40,346		
Liberal hold		Swing		–3.21
Source: Elections Ontario

1951 Ontario general election
Party	Candidate	Votes	%	±%
Liberal	Arthur Reaume	10,051	39.85	+7.21
Progressive Conservative	Roland C. Mott	7,808	30.96	+0.08
Co-operative Commonwealth	Gordon Bennett Ellis	7,362	29.19	–7.30
Total valid votes		25,221	98.50	
Total rejected ballots		383	1.50	+0.43
Turnout		25,604	70.01	+2.62
Eligible voters		36,573		
Liberal gain from Co-operative Commonwealth		Swing		+7.26
Source: Elections Ontario

1948 Ontario general election
Party	Candidate	Votes	%	±%
Co-operative Commonwealth	Gordon Bennett Ellis	7,497	36.49	+5.64
Liberal	Adrian Tellier	6,707	32.64	–3.77
Progressive Conservative	Edward P. Morand	6,344	30.87	–1.87
Total valid votes		20,548	98.94	
Total rejected ballots		221	1.06	–0.44
Turnout		20,769	67.38	–1.35
Eligible voters		30,822		
Co-operative Commonwealth gain from Liberal–Labour		Swing		+4.71
Source: Elections Ontario

1945 Ontario general election
Party	Candidate	Votes	%	±%
Liberal–Labour	Alexander Parent	6,801	36.41	–
Progressive Conservative	Harry A. Drouillard	6,116	32.74	+16.63
Co-operative Commonwealth	Gordon Bennett Ellis	5,762	30.85	–22.74
Total valid votes		18,679	98.49	
Total rejected ballots		286	1.51	–0.26
Turnout		18,965	68.74	+10.45
Eligible voters		27,591		
Liberal–Labour gain from Co-operative Commonwealth		Swing		–
Source: Elections Ontario

1943 Ontario general election
Party	Candidate	Votes	%	±%
Co-operative Commonwealth	Arthur Nelson Alles	7,999	53.59	+49.43
Liberal	Adélard Trottier	3,153	21.12	–30.73
Progressive Conservative	Philip J. Morgan	2,405	16.11	–18.65
Independent Liberal	Noe J. Bontront	1,213	8.13	–
Labour	Alfred DeBeaulieu	157	1.05	–
Total valid votes		14,927	98.24	
Total rejected ballots		268	1.76	–1.46
Turnout		15,195	58.29	–15.42
Eligible voters		26,068		
Co-operative Commonwealth gain from Liberal		Swing		+34.04
Source: Elections Ontario

1937 Ontario general election
Party	Candidate	Votes	%	±%
Liberal	Adélard Trottier	7,449	51.85	+1.14
Conservative	Paul Poisson	4,994	34.76	+4.65
Farm-Labour	Thomas Raycraft	1,326	9.23	–
Co-operative Commonwealth	Alcide Leblanc	598	4.16	–8.16
Total valid votes		14,367	96.78	
Total rejected ballots		478	3.22	+1.63
Turnout		14,845	73.71	–3.33
Eligible voters		20,140		
Liberal hold		Swing		–1.76
Source: Elections Ontario

1934 Ontario general election
Party	Candidate	Votes	%	±%
Liberal	Adélard Trottier	7,459	50.71	+6.68
Conservative	Paul Poisson	4,429	30.11	–25.86
Co-operative Commonwealth	Joseph Benonie Levert	1,812	12.32	–
Communist	Reginald Morris	1,009	6.86	–
Total valid votes		14,709	98.41	
Total rejected ballots		238	1.59	+0.08
Turnout		14,947	77.04	+13.44
Eligible voters		19,401		
Liberal gain from Conservative		Swing		+16.27
Source: Elections Ontario

1929 Ontario general election
Party	Candidate	Votes	%	±%
Conservative	Paul Poisson	8,043	55.97	–
Liberal	A. A. Marentette	6,328	44.03	–
Total valid votes		14,371	98.49	
Total rejected ballots		220	1.51	–
Turnout		14,591	63.61	–
Eligible voters		22,940		
Conservative hold		Swing		+0.00
Source: Elections Ontario

1926 Ontario general election
Party	Candidate	Votes	%	±%
Conservative	Paul Poisson	acclaimed	–	–
Total valid votes			–	
Total rejected ballots		–		
Turnout			–	–
Eligible voters				
Conservative gain from Liberal		Swing		–
Source: Elections Ontario

1923 Ontario general election
Party	Candidate	Votes	%	±%
Liberal	Edward Philip Tellier	4,282	62.15	–
United Farmers	Alphonse George Tisdelle	2,608	37.85	–33.24
Total valid votes		6,890	99.22	
Total rejected ballots		54	0.78	–2.41
Turnout		6,944	49.08	–23.65
Eligible voters		14,148		
Liberal gain from United Farmers		Swing		–
Source: Elections Ontario

1919 Ontario general election
Party	Candidate	Votes	%	±%
United Farmers	Alphonse George Tisdelle	6,486	71.09	–
Conservative	Paul Poisson	2,638	28.91	–13.51
Total valid votes		9,124	96.82	
Total rejected ballots		300	3.18	+2.38
Turnout		9,424	72.73	+3.60
Eligible voters		12,958		
United Farmers gain from Liberal		Swing		+6.75
Source: Elections Ontario

1914 Ontario general election
Party	Candidate	Votes	%	±%
Liberal	Severin Ducharme	2,431	57.58	+41.62
Conservative	Paul Poisson	1,791	42.42	–0.04
Total valid votes		4,222	99.20	
Total rejected ballots		34	0.80	+0.05
Turnout		4,256	69.12	+14.66
Eligible voters		6,157		
Liberal gain from Conservative		Swing		+20.83
Source: Elections Ontario

1911 Ontario general election
Party	Candidate	Votes	%	±%
Conservative	Joseph Octave Reaume	2,586	42.46	–21.17
Independent Conservative	Severin Ducharme	2,533	41.59	–
Liberal	John Robert Mason	972	15.96	–20.41
Total valid votes		6,091	99.25	
Total rejected ballots		46	0.75	+0.24
Turnout		6,137	54.46	+2.73
Eligible voters		11,268		
Conservative hold		Swing		–
Source: Elections Ontario

1908 Ontario general election
Party	Candidate	Votes	%	±%
Conservative	Joseph Octave Reaume	2,988	63.63	–
Liberal	Archibald McNee	1,708	36.37	–
Total valid votes		4,696	99.49	
Total rejected ballots		24	0.51	–
Turnout		4,720	51.74	–
Eligible voters		9,123		
Conservative hold		Swing		–
Source: Elections Ontario

Ontario provincial by-election, February 21, 1905 Ministerial by-election
Party	Candidate	Votes
Conservative	Joseph Octave Reaume	acclaimed
Source: Elections Ontario

1905 Ontario general election
Party	Candidate	Votes	%	±%
Conservative	Joseph Octave Reaume	3,385	57.04	+4.09
Liberal	E. J. Girardot	2,549	42.96	–4.09
Total valid votes		5,934	99.33	
Total rejected ballots		40	0.67	–0.52
Turnout		5,974	68.70	+2.00
Eligible voters		8,696		
Conservative hold		Swing		+4.09
Source: Elections Ontario

1902 Ontario general election
Party	Candidate	Votes	%	±%
Conservative	Joseph Octave Reaume	2,940	52.95	+4.58
Liberal	William J. McKee	2,612	47.05	–3.10
Total valid votes		5,552	98.81	
Total rejected ballots		67	1.19	+0.08
Turnout		5,619	66.69	+2.33
Eligible voters		8,425		
Conservative gain from Liberal		Swing		+3.84
Source: Elections Ontario

1898 Ontario general election
Party	Candidate	Votes	%	±%
Liberal	William J. McKee	2,683	50.15	+7.69
Conservative	G. A. Wintemute	2,588	48.37	+27.62
Independent	Mr. Martin	79	1.48	–
Total valid votes		5,350	98.89	
Total rejected ballots		60	1.11	+0.15
Turnout		5,410	64.37	+9.77
Eligible voters		8,405		
Liberal hold		Swing		+17.66
Source: Elections Ontario

1894 Ontario general election
Party	Candidate	Votes	%	±%
Liberal	William J. McKee	1,843	42.46	–9.65
Liberal-Patrons of Industry	G. A. Wintemute	1,597	36.79	–
Conservative	Solomon White	901	20.76	–27.14
Total valid votes		4,341	99.04	
Total rejected ballots		42	0.96	+0.28
Turnout		4,383	54.60	–3.62
Eligible voters		8,028		
Liberal gain from Conservative		Swing		–4.82
Source: Elections Ontario

1890 Ontario general election
Party	Candidate	Votes	%	±%
Conservative	Solomon White	1,901	47.90	–0.93
Liberal	Gaspard Pacaud	1,266	31.90	–19.27
Liberal	Francis Cleary	802	20.21	–30.96
Total valid votes		3,969	99.32	
Total rejected ballots		27	0.68	–0.38
Turnout		3,996	58.22	–0.48
Eligible voters		6,864		
Conservative gain from Liberal		Swing		+9.17
Source: Elections Ontario

1886 Ontario general election
Party	Candidate	Votes	%	±%
Liberal	Gaspard Pacaud	1,729	51.17	+7.10
Conservative	Solomon White	1,650	48.83	–7.10
Total valid votes		3,379	98.95	
Total rejected ballots		36	1.05	+0.19
Turnout		3,415	58.70	–0.90
Eligible voters		5,818		
Liberal gain from Conservative		Swing		+7.10
Source: Elections Ontario

1883 Ontario general election
Party	Candidate	Votes	%	±%
Conservative	Solomon White	1,537	55.93	–0.11
Liberal	Mr. Plant	1,211	44.07	+0.11
Total valid votes		2,748	99.13	
Total rejected ballots		24	0.87	+0.87
Turnout		2,772	59.60	+16.92
Eligible voters		4,651		
Conservative hold		Swing		–0.11
Source: Elections Ontario

1875 Ontario general election
Party	Candidate	Votes	%
Conservative	James Colebrooke Patterson	1,209	61.56
Independent	Luc Montrieul	755	38.44
Turnout		1,964	54.37
Eligible voters		3,612	
Conservative pickup new district.			
Source: Elections Ontario

Ontario provincial by-election, September 1878 Resignation of James Colebrooke Patterson
Party	Candidate	Votes	%	±%
Conservative	Solomon White	687	99.85	+38.30
Independent	Mr. Rankin	1	0.15	
Total valid votes		688		
Conservative hold		Swing		+38.30
Source: History of the Electoral Districts, Legislatures and Ministries of the Province of Ontario

1879 Ontario general election
Party	Candidate	Votes	%	±%
Conservative	Solomon White	1,062	56.04	−43.81
Liberal	Mr. Gigniac	833	43.96	
Total valid votes		1,895	42.68	
Eligible voters		4,440		
Conservative hold		Swing		−43.81
Source: Elections Ontario
