= Gaspard Pacaud =

Canadian politician

Ontario MPP
- In office 1886–1890
- Preceded by: Solomon White
- Succeeded by: Solomon White
- Constituency: Essex North

Personal details
- Born: June 24, 1859 Saint-Norbert-d'Arthabaska, Canada East
- Died: August 28, 1928 (aged 69) Windsor, Ontario
- Party: Liberal
- Spouse: Annie F. McEwan (m. 1890)
- Occupation: Journalist

Gaspard Pacaud (June 24, 1859 – August 28, 1928) was a Canadian journalist and political figure in Ontario. He represented Essex North in the Legislative Assembly of Ontario from 1886 to 1890 as a Liberal member.

He was born Jean-Baptiste-Napoléon-Gaspard Pacaud in Saint-Norbert-d'Arthabaska, Canada East in 1859, the son of Philippe-Napoléon Pacaud, a notary and Patriote. He studied in Montreal and at the seminaries at Nicolet and Trois-Rivières. Pacaud began the study of law but then chose journalism as a career. With his brother Aurèle, he established a French language newspaper, Le Progrès, in Windsor in 1881. In 1890, Pacaud married Annie F. McEwan. He was defeated by Solomon White when he ran for reelection in 1890, after the Liberal vote was split between Pacaud and Francis Cleary, the candidate chosen by the riding association. Following his defeat, he became a notary public, also continuing as newspaper editor until he was appointed license inspector for hotels for the region in 1892. Le Progrès continued to be published until 1902. Pacaud died in Windsor in 1928.

His brother Ernest was a newspaper publisher involved in Quebec politics.
