= Gordon McGregor =

Gordon McGregor may refer to:

- Gordon Roy McGregor (1901–1971), Canadian businessman and the first president of Air Canada
- Gordon Morton McGregor (1873–1922), Canadian businessman who founded the Ford Motor Company of Canada
- Gordon McGregor (cricketer) (1915–1982), New Zealand cricketer
- Gordon McGregor (speedway rider) (1921–2001), Scottish motorcycle speedway rider
