= Edward Norman Lewis =

Canadian politician

Member of the Canadian Parliament for Huron West
- In office 1904–1917
- Preceded by: Robert Holmes
- Succeeded by: The electoral district was abolished in 1914.

Personal details
- Born: September 18, 1858 Goderich, Canada West
- Died: February 23, 1931 (aged 72)
- Party: Conservative

Edward Norman Lewis (September 18, 1858 – February 23, 1931) was a Canadian politician.

Born in Goderich, Canada West, the son of Ira Lewis (who was also a Crown attorney) and Julia L. Welsh, he was a lawyer, acting crown attorney and Clerk of the Peace for Huron County. He was Mayor of Goderich before being elected to the House of Commons of Canada for the riding of Huron West in the 1904 federal election. A Conservative, he was re-elected in 1908 and 1911. He did not run in 1917.
