= Murdo Young McLean =

Canadian politician (1848–1916)

Murdo Young McLean (February 7, 1848 – January 19, 1916) was a Canadian newspaper publisher and political figure in Ontario. He represented Huron South in the Legislative Assembly of Ontario from 1894 to 1898, and in the House of Commons of Canada from 1908 to 1911 as a Liberal member.

He was born in North Dumfries Township, Waterloo County, Canada West and educated in Ayr. McLean was editor and publisher of the Huron Expositor, previously known as the Seaforth Expositor; he purchased the paper in 1870, with his brother Alan. He served on the town council for Seaforth, also serving as reeve, mayor and as a member of the public school board. McLean was secretary-treasurer for the Farmers' Mutual Insurance Company and the South Huron Agricultural Society. He was elected to the House of Commons in a 1908 by-election held after the death of Benjamin B. Gunn and then reelected in the general election later that year. In 1911, he was defeated for the federal seat by Jonathan Joseph Merner. He died of heart failure in Seaforth in 1916.

His grandson Andrew Young McLean later served in the House of Commons and was also publisher for the Expositor which remained in the McLean family until 1982.

== Notes ==
Parliament of Canada
| Preceded by Benjamin B. Gunn | Member of Parliament for Huron South; 1908–1911 | Succeeded by Jonathan Joseph Merner |
