= William McGregor (politician) =

Canadian politician

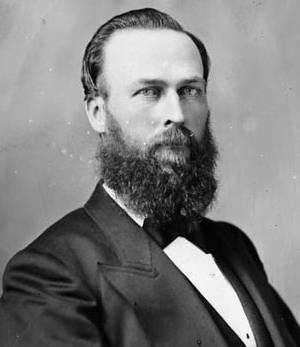

Personal details
- Born: 24 June 1836; Sarnia, Upper Canada
- Died: 14 May 1903 (aged 66); Windsor
- Spouse: Jessie L. Peden (m. 1866)
- Children: Gordon McGregor
- Occupation: Businessman; Politician

William McGregor (June 24, 1836 – May 14, 1903) was a Canadian businessman and political figure. He represented Essex in the House of Commons of Canada as a Liberal member from 1874 to 1878 and from 1891 to 1900.

He was born in Sarnia, Upper Canada, in 1836 and educated in Amherstburg. He supplied horses to the Union Army during the American Civil War. McGregor was president of the Walkerville Wagon Company Limited. He also owned the street railway in Windsor, a bank, a mill and a fence company. In 1866, he married Jessie L. Peden. McGregor served as reeve of Windsor for six years and as warden for Essex County from 1869 to 1870 and from 1872 to 1873. He also served as customs collector at Windsor. He died in Windsor at the age of 66.

His son Gordon took over his father's wagon factory and later became the first president of the Ford Motor Company of Canada. The town of McGregor, now part of Essex, Ontario, was named after William McGregor.

== Electoral record ==
1878 Canadian federal election: Essex
| Party | Candidate | Votes | % | ±% |
|---|---|---|---|---|
| Conservative | J.C. Patterson | 2,596 | 52.5% | |
| Liberal | William McGregor | 2,318 | 46.9% | -23.2% |
| Unknown | J.H. Morgan | 27 | 0.5% | |
| Total valid votes | | 4,941 | 100.0% | |

Canadian federal by-election, 22 October 1874
| Party | Candidate | Votes | % | ±% |
|---|---|---|---|---|
On Mr. McGregor being unseated on petition, 26 August 1874
| Liberal | William McGregor | 1,763 | 70.2% | +11.4% |
| Unknown | Jeremiah O'Connor | 750 | 29.8% | -11.4% |
| Total valid votes | | 2,513 | 100.0% | |

1874 Canadian federal election: Essex
| Party | Candidate | Votes | % | ±% |
|---|---|---|---|---|
| Liberal | William McGregor | 2,508 | 58.7% | |
| Unknown | John O'Connor | 1,763 | 41.3% | |
| Total valid votes | | 4,271 | 100.0% | |
Source: lop.parl.ca
