= Benjamin B. Gunn =

Canadian politician

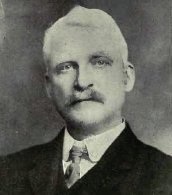

Member of the Canadian Parliament for Huron South
- In office 1904–1907
- Preceded by: George McEwen
- Succeeded by: Murdo Young McLean

Personal details
- Born: February 15, 1860 Wallacetown, Canada West
- Died: December 9, 1907 (aged 47)
- Party: Conservative

Benjamin B. Gunn (February 15, 1860 – December 9, 1907) was a Canadian politician.

Born in Wallacetown, Canada West, Gunn was educated in Wallacetown and was a merchant by profession. He was elected to the House of Commons of Canada for the electoral district of Huron South in the general elections of 1904. A Conservative, he died in office in 1907.
