= William Black (Canadian politician) =

Canadian politician

Member of Parliament for Huron South
- In office December 1921 – September 1925
- Preceded by: Jonathan Joseph Merner
- Succeeded by: Thomas McMillan

Personal details
- Born: 22 March 1869 McKillop Township, Ontario, Canada
- Died: 3 May 1930 (aged 61)
- Party: Progressive
- Profession: farmer

William Black (22 March 1869 – 3 May 1930) was a Progressive party member of the House of Commons of Canada. He was born in McKillop Township, Ontario and became a farmer.

He was elected to Parliament at the Huron South riding in the 1921 general election. After completing his only term, the 14th Canadian Parliament, Black left federal politics and did not seek another term in the 1925 election.
