= John McMillan (Ontario politician) =

Canadian politician (1824–1901)

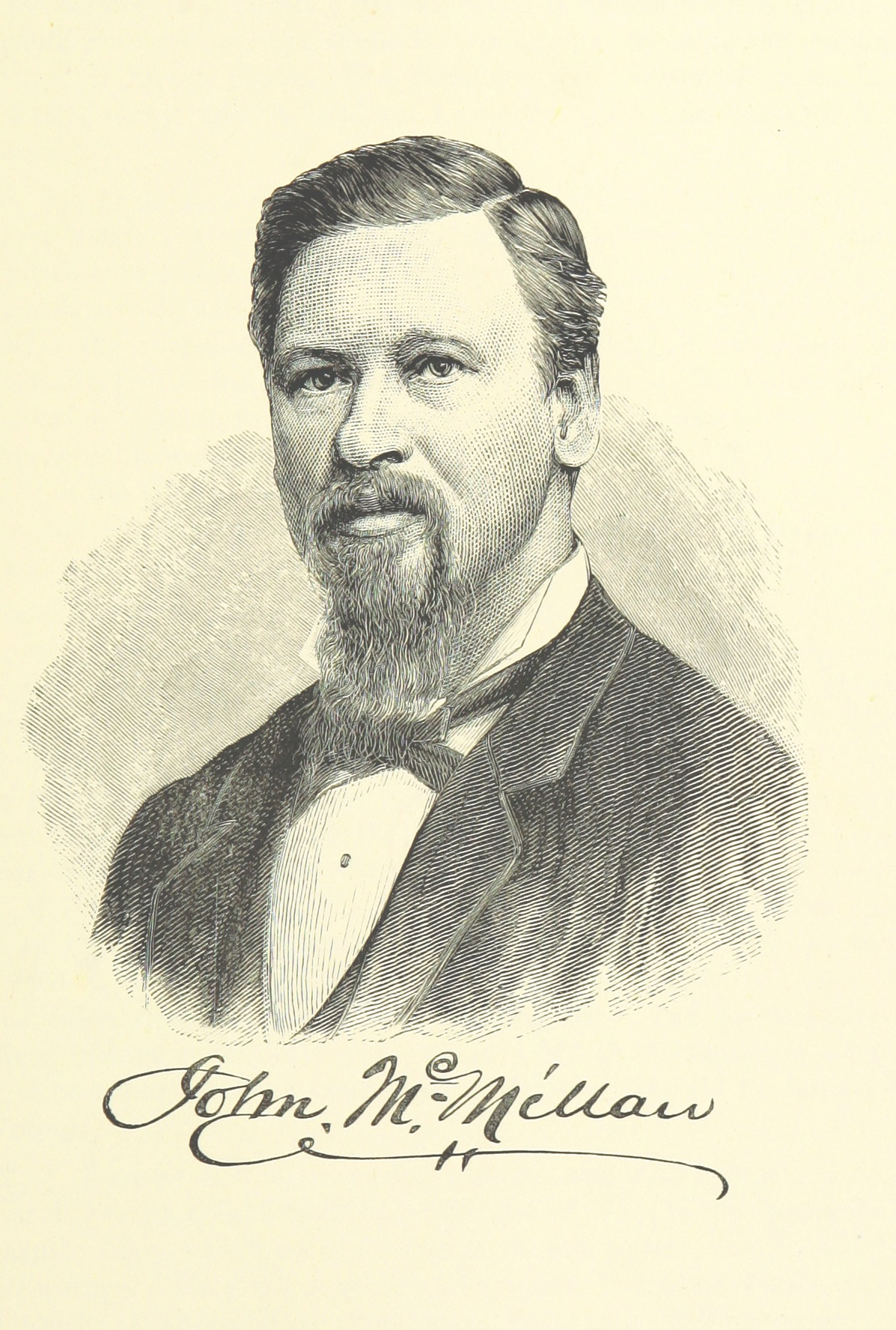
John McMillan

John McMillan (July 24, 1824 – October 31, 1901) was an Ontario farmer and political figure. He represented Huron South in the House of Commons of Canada as a Liberal member in 1883 and from 1887 to 1900.

He was born in Kirkconnel, Dumfriesshire, Scotland in 1824 and came to Huron County in Canada West with his brother in 1843. He purchased land from the Canada Company and began farming on it, raising and selling beef cattle and Clydesdale horses. In 1880, he was appointed to the Ontario agricultural commission, which prepared a report that described the state of agriculture in the province.

He served on the advisory board of the Ontario Agricultural College and lectured as part of the Farmers' Institutes program initiated by the college. McMillan served as reeve for Hullett Township from 1877 to 1882 and from 1884 to 1887.

== Death ==
McMillan died on his farm in Hullett Township in 1901, aged 77.

Parliament of Canada
Preceded by Malcolm Colin Cameron	Member of Parliament for Huron South; 1882–1883	Succeeded by Richard John Cartwright
Preceded by Richard John Cartwright	Member of Parliament for Huron South; 1887–1900	Succeeded by George McEwen
