= Huron South =

Former federal electoral district in Ontario, Canada

Ontario electoral district

Defunct federal electoral district
- Legislature: House of Commons
- District created: 1867
- District abolished: 1933
- First contested: 1867
- Last contested: 1932 by-election

Huron South was a federal electoral district in Ontario, Canada, that was represented in the House of Commons of Canada from 1867 to 1935. It was created by the British North America Act 1867 which divided the County of Huron into two ridings: Huron North and Huron South.

In 1872, the County of Huron was divided into three ridings, and Huron Centre was created. The South Riding was defined to consist of the Townships of Goderich, Stanley, Hay, Stephen, and Usborne, and the Village of Clinton.

In 1882, the South Riding was redefined to consist of the townships of McKillop, Hullett, Tuckersmith, Stanley, and Hay, the town of Seaforth, and the village of Bayfield.

In 1903, the county of Huron was divided into three ridings: Huron East, Huron West and Huron South. Huron South was redefined to exclude the township of Hullett, and include the townships of Stephen and Usborne and the villages of Exeter and Hensall.

In 1914, the county of Huron was divided into two ridings: Huron North and Huron South. Huron South was expanded to include the townships of Hullet and Goderich, and the town of Clinton.

In 1924, Huron South was redefined to consist of the part of the County of Huron lying south of and excluding the town of Goderich, and north of and including the townships of Goderich, Hullett, and McKillop.

The electoral district was abolished in 1933 when it was redistributed between Huron North and Huron—Perth ridings.

== Members of Parliament ==
This riding has elected the following members of Parliament:

Parliament	Years	Member	Party
1st	1867–1872	Malcolm Colin Cameron	Liberal
2nd	1872–1874	Malcolm Colin Cameron	Liberal
3rd	1874–1874	Malcolm Colin Cameron	Liberal
3rd	1875–1878	Thomas Greenway	Independent
4th	1878–1882	Malcolm Colin Cameron	Liberal
5th	1882–1883	John McMillan	Liberal
5th	1883–1887	Richard John Cartwright	Liberal
6th	1887–1891	John McMillan	Liberal
7th	1891–1896	John McMillan	Liberal
8th	1896–1900	John McMillan	Liberal
9th	1900–1904	George McEwen	Liberal
10th	1904–1907†	Benjamin B. Gunn	Conservative
10th	1908–1908	Murdo Young McLean	Liberal
11th	1908–1911	Murdo Young McLean	Liberal
12th	1911–1917	Jonathan Joseph Merner	Conservative
13th	1917–1921	Jonathan Joseph Merner	Government (Unionist)
14th	1921–1925	William Black	Progressive
15th	1925–1926	Thomas McMillan	Liberal
16th	1926–1930	Thomas McMillan	Liberal
17th	1930–1932†	Thomas McMillan	Liberal
17th	1932–1935	William Henry Golding	Liberal
Riding dissolved into Huron North and Huron—Perth

== Election results ==
1867 Canadian federal election
Party	Candidate	Votes
Liberal	Malcolm Colin Cameron	1,624
Conservative	G. H. Ritchie	1,453
Unknown	D. L. Sills	1
Eligible voters		3,853
Source: Canadian Parliamentary Guide, 1871

1872 Canadian federal election
Party	Candidate	Votes
Liberal	Malcolm Colin Cameron	1,393
Independent	Thomas Greenway	1,308

1874 Canadian federal election
Party	Candidate	Votes
Liberal	Malcolm Colin Cameron	1,522
Independent	Thomas Greenway	1,436

On the election being declared void, 22 February 1874:

By-election on 11 February 1875
Party	Candidate	Votes
Independent	Thomas Greenway	acclaimed

1878 Canadian federal election
Party	Candidate	Votes
Liberal	Malcolm Colin Cameron	1,874
Liberal–Conservative	Robert Porter	1,709

1882 Canadian federal election
Party	Candidate	Votes
Liberal	John McMillan	1,621
Unknown	W. J. Shannon	1,024

On Mr. McMillan's resignation, Dec. 1883:

By-election on 10 December 1883
Party	Candidate	Votes
Liberal	Richard John Cartwright	acclaimed

1887 Canadian federal election
Party	Candidate	Votes
Liberal	John McMillan	1,784
Liberal	John Campbell	1,026

1891 Canadian federal election
Party	Candidate	Votes
Liberal	John McMillan	1,845
Liberal	David Weismiller	990
Unknown	John Reith	54

1896 Canadian federal election
Party	Candidate	Votes
Liberal	John McMillan	1,831
Conservative	T. E. Hays	1,526

1900 Canadian federal election
Party	Candidate	Votes
Liberal	George McEwen	1,696
Liberal	John McMillan	1,475

1904 Canadian federal election
Party	Candidate	Votes
Conservative	Benjamin B. Gunn	2,532
Liberal	Thomas Fraser	2,421

On Mr. Gunn's death, 9 December 1907:

By-election on 22 January 1908
Party	Candidate	Votes
Liberal	Murdo Young McLean	2,679
Conservative	Henry Horton	2,562

1908 Canadian federal election
Party	Candidate	Votes
Liberal	Murdo Young McLean	2,586
Conservative	John Sherritt	2,432

1911 Canadian federal election
Party	Candidate	Votes
Conservative	Jonathan Joseph Merner	2,360
Liberal	Murdo Young McLean	2,246

1917 Canadian federal election
Party	Candidate	Votes
Government (Unionist)	Jonathan Joseph Merner	3,932
Opposition (Laurier Liberals)	Thomas McMillan	3,389

1921 Canadian federal election
Party	Candidate	Votes
Progressive	William Black	4,105
Liberal	Thomas McMillan	4,061
Conservative	Jonathan Joseph Merner	3,965

1925 Canadian federal election
Party	Candidate	Votes
Liberal	Thomas McMillan	4,947
Conservative	Jonathan Joseph Merner	4,694
Progressive	Robert J. McMillan	1,680

1926 Canadian federal election
Party	Candidate	Votes
Liberal	Thomas McMillan	6,370
Conservative	Andrew Hicks	5,217

1930 Canadian federal election
Party	Candidate	Votes
Liberal	Thomas McMillan	6,176
Conservative	Nelson W. Trewartha	5,827

On Mr. McMillan's death, 7 June 1932:

By-election on 3 October 1932
Party	Candidate	Votes
Liberal	William Henry Golding	7,046
Conservative	Louis Henry Rader	5,060

== See also ==
- List of Canadian electoral districts
- Historical federal electoral districts of Canada
