= William Henry Golding =

Canadian politician

The Honourable William Henry Golding

Member of Parliament for Huron South
- In office October 1932 – October 1935
- Preceded by: Thomas McMillan
- Succeeded by: riding dissolved

Member of Parliament for Huron—Perth
- In office October 1935 – December 1961
- Preceded by: riding created
- Succeeded by: Andrew Young McLean

Personal details
- Born: William Henry Golding; 14 April 1878 Hibbert Township, Ontario, Canada
- Died: 31 December 1961 (aged 83)
- Party: Liberal
- Spouse(s): Alena Kenchen m. 28 January 1913
- Profession: machinist

William Henry Golding (14 April 1878 – 31 December 1961) was a Liberal party member of the House of Commons of Canada. He was born in Hibbert Township, Ontario and became a machinist by career.

== Background ==
In 1916, Golding became a municipal councillor in Seaforth, Ontario and continued in that role until he became the town's mayor in 1921. He remained mayor until 1929.

He was first elected to Parliament at the Huron South riding in a by-election on 3 October 1932, then re-elected there in the 1935 federal election. With electoral district changes, he was re-elected at Huron—Perth in 1940 and 1945. He left the House of Commons in June 1949 when he was appointed to the Senate. He remained a senator until his death on 31 December 1961.
