= Monarch (marque) =

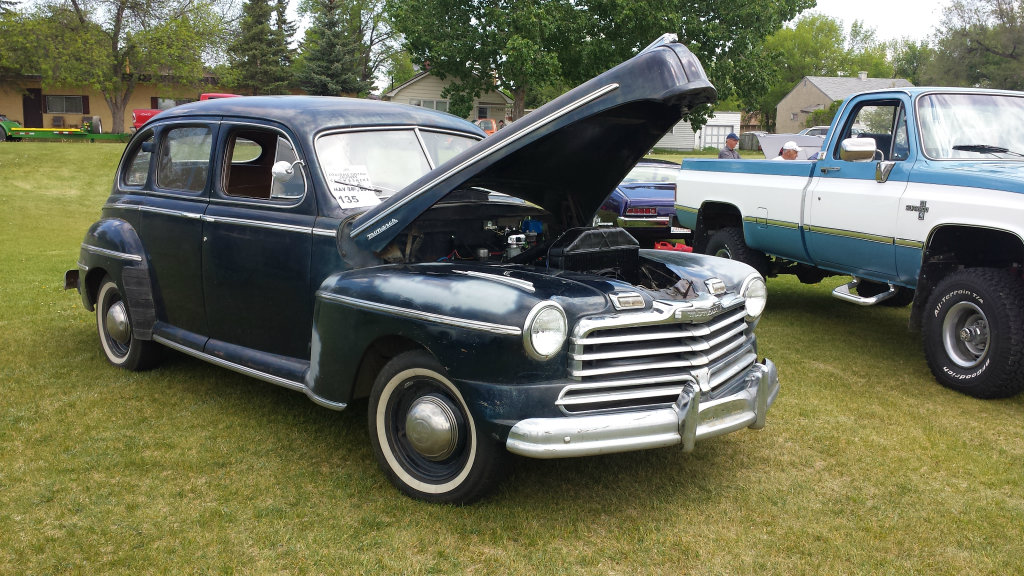
- 1948 Monarch sedan

Overview
- Manufacturer: Ford Motor Company of Canada
- Production: 1946–57, 1958–61

Body and chassis
- Body style: 2-door sedan 4-door sedan 2-door coupe 2-door hardtop 4-door hardtop 2-door convertible 2-door station wagon 4-door station wagon
- Layout: FR layout
- Related: Mercury

Monarch was an automobile marque produced by Ford Canada from 1946 through 1957 and from 1959 to 1961. The Monarch was marketed as its own brand of car rather than as a Ford, with its own model names which included Richelieu, Lucerne and Sceptre.

== Overview ==
The Monarch was introduced on 23 March 1946. Based on the contemporary Mercury, it had Canadian market-specific trim, unique grilles, taillights and other trim to marginally differentiate them from their Mercury relatives. Initially marketed simply as the Monarch, later model names included Richelieu, Lucerne and Sceptre. These were variations of the Mercury Eight (later the Monterey), Montclair and Park Lane models, respectively. The Monarch line provided Canadian Ford dealerships a product to sell above its Ford-badged models, in the medium-price field. Ford of Canada also built the Meteor range for its Lincoln-Mercury dealers to sell below its Mercury-badged models. This was typical practice in the Canadian market, where smaller towns might have only a single dealer who was expected to offer a full range of products in various price classes.

The Monarch line of vehicles was discontinued for 1958 when the Edsel was introduced, but the poor acceptance of the Edsel led Ford to reintroduce Monarch for 1959. With a drop in medium-priced vehicle sales in the early 1960s, and the introduction of the similarly priced Ford Galaxie, the Monarch brand was dropped again after the 1961 model year, with approximately 95,450 cars built in 15 years.

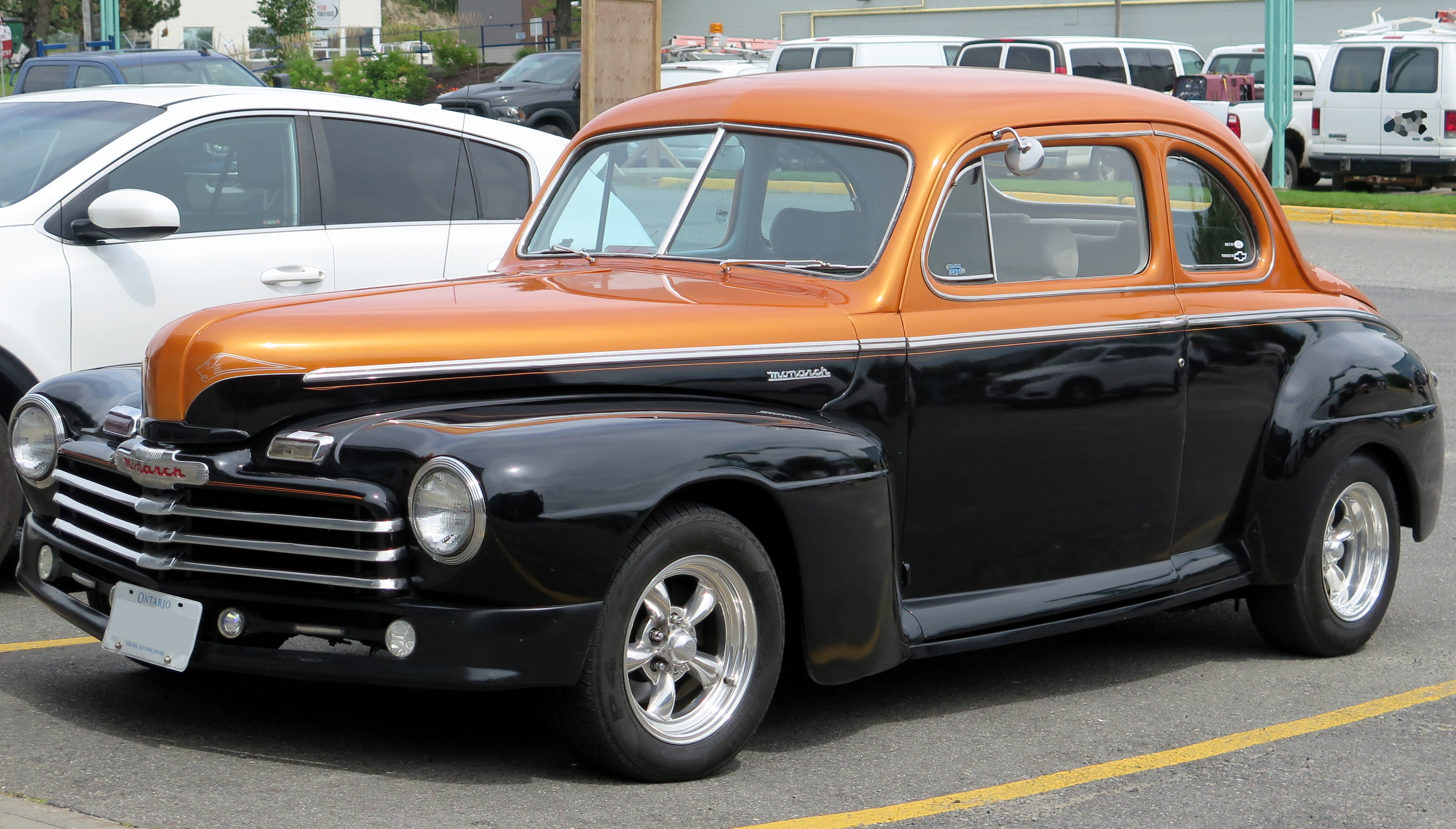
Modified 1947 Monarch Coupe

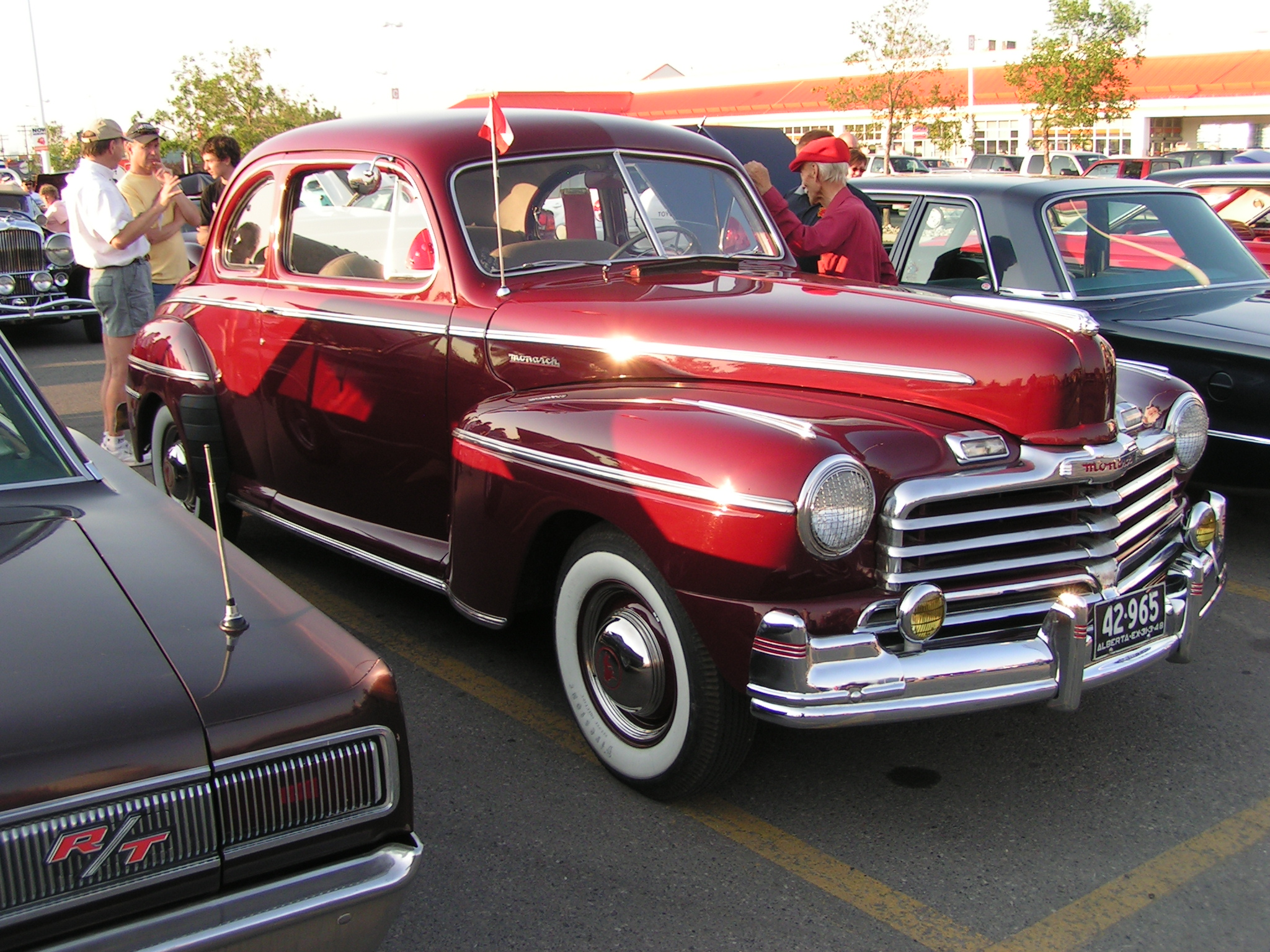
1948 Monarch Coupe

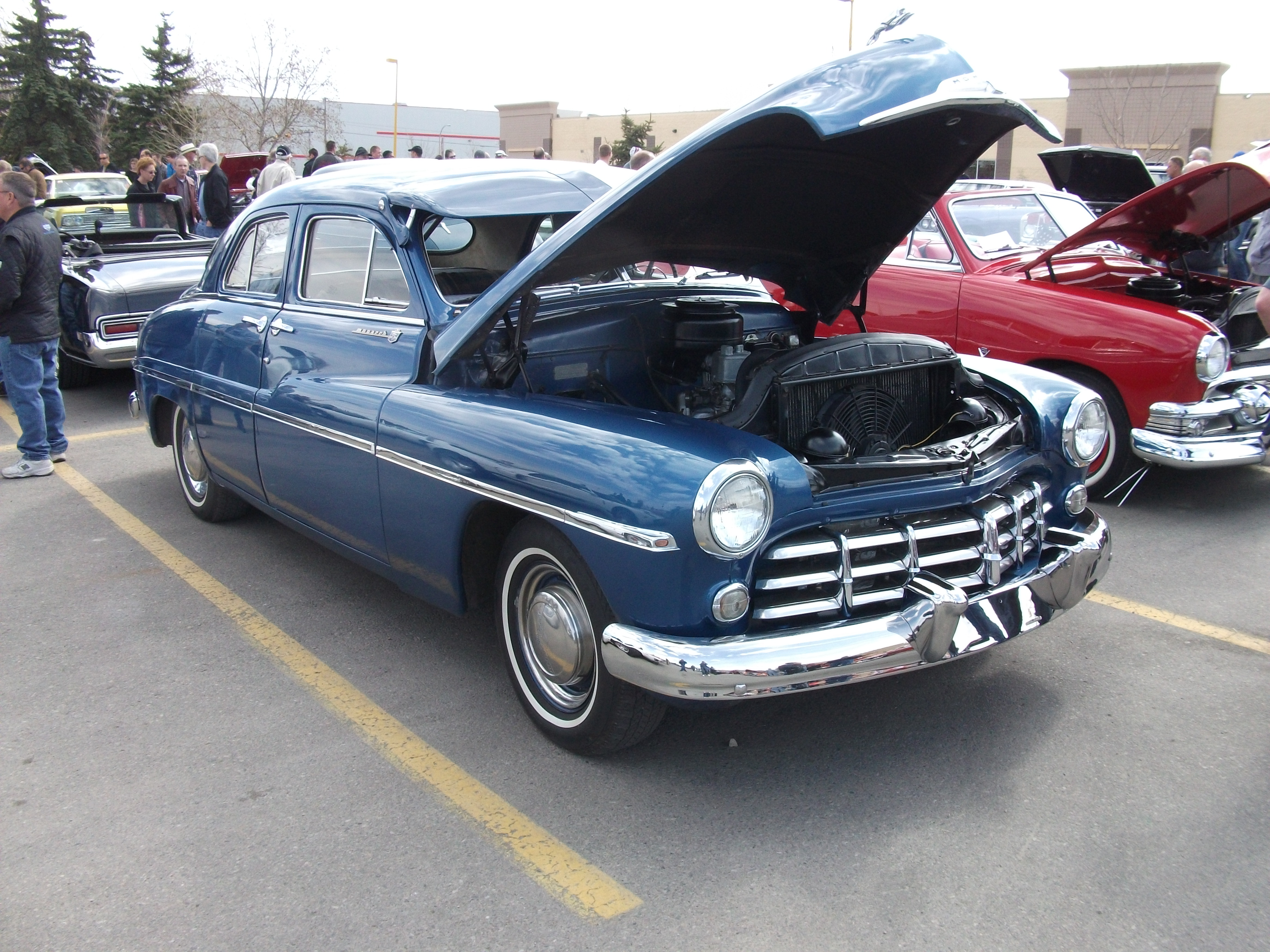
1949 Monarch Sport Sedan

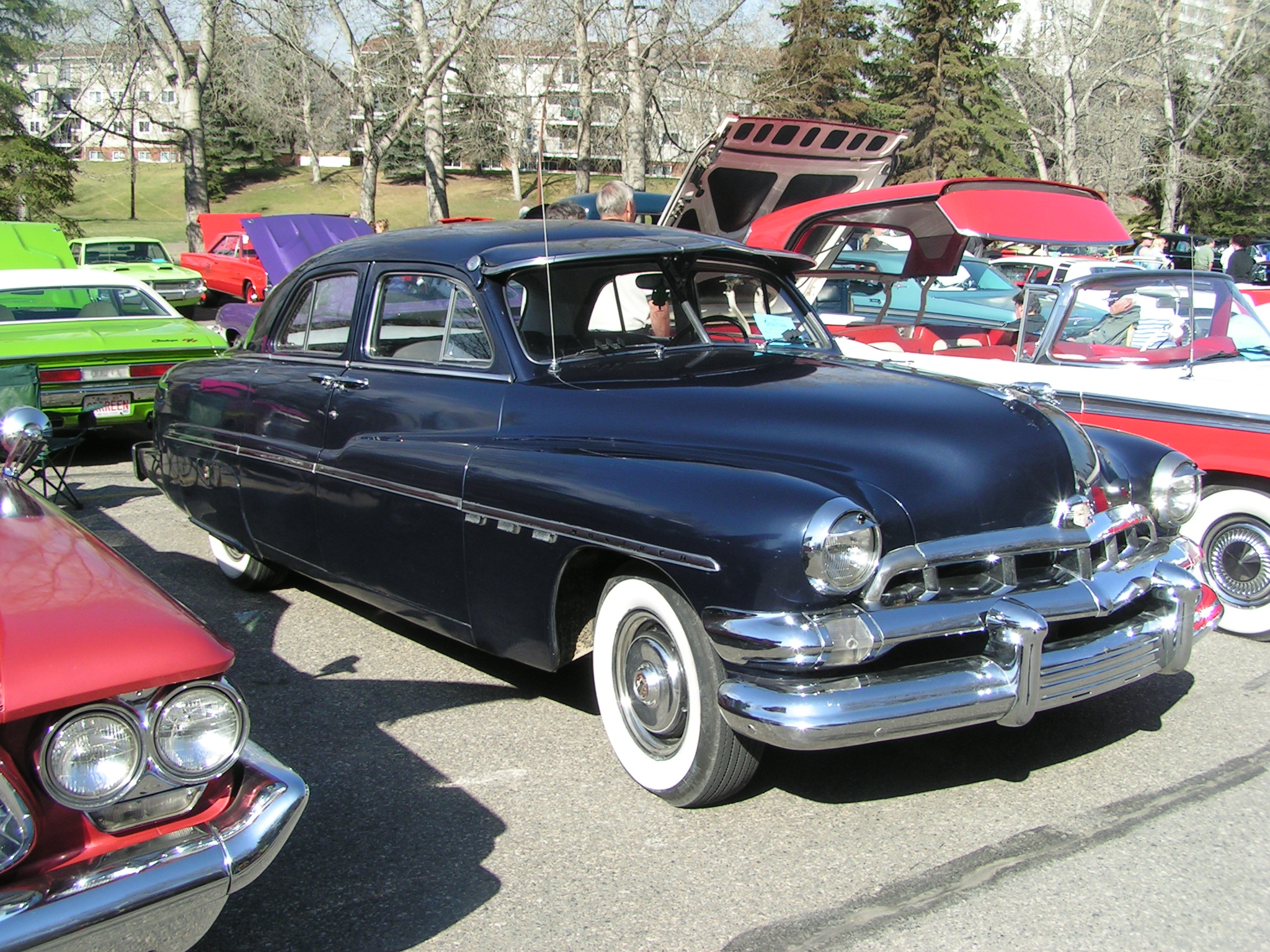
1951 Monarch Sport Sedan

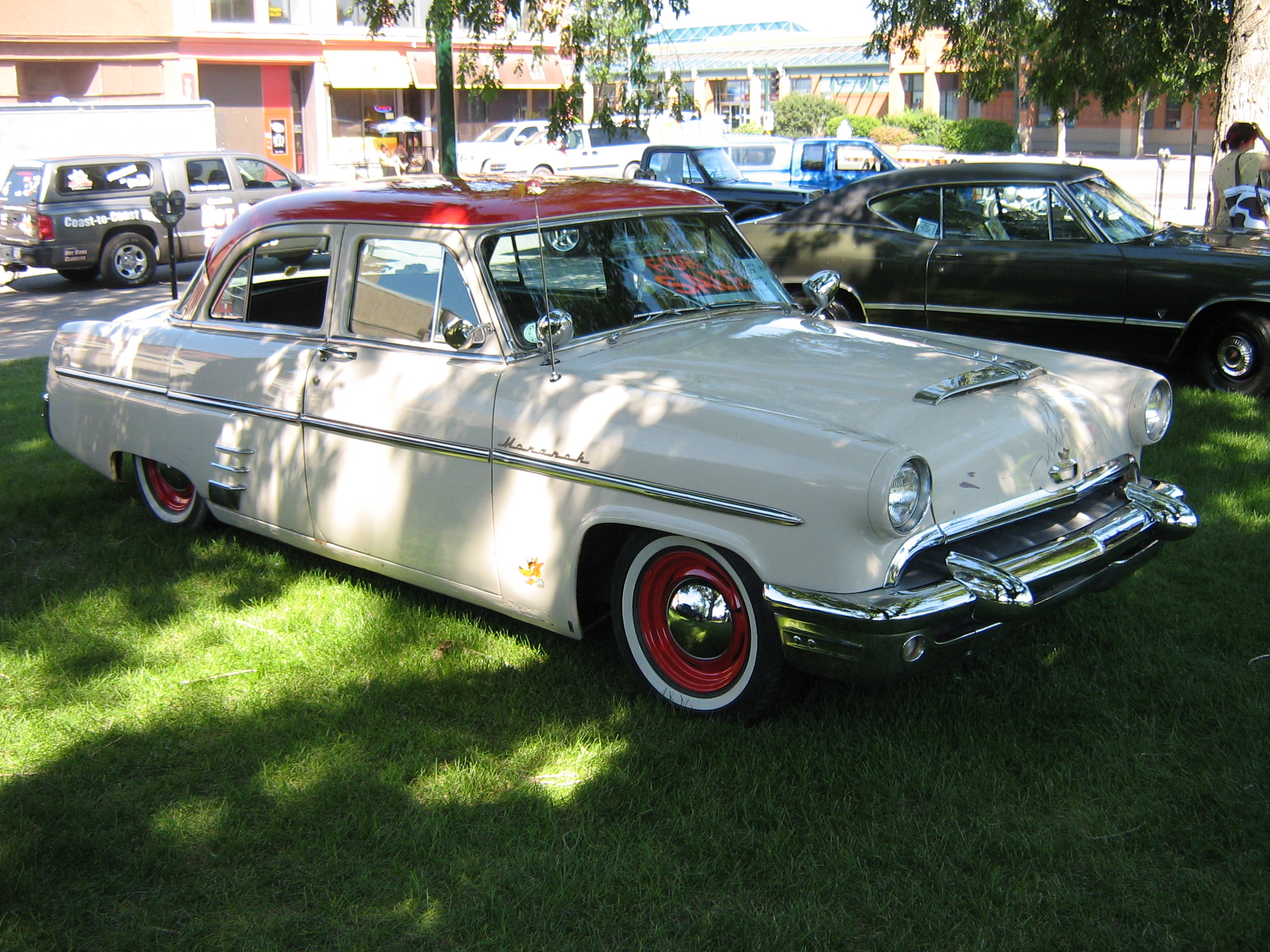
1953 Monarch Two-Door Sedan (with non-standard wheels)

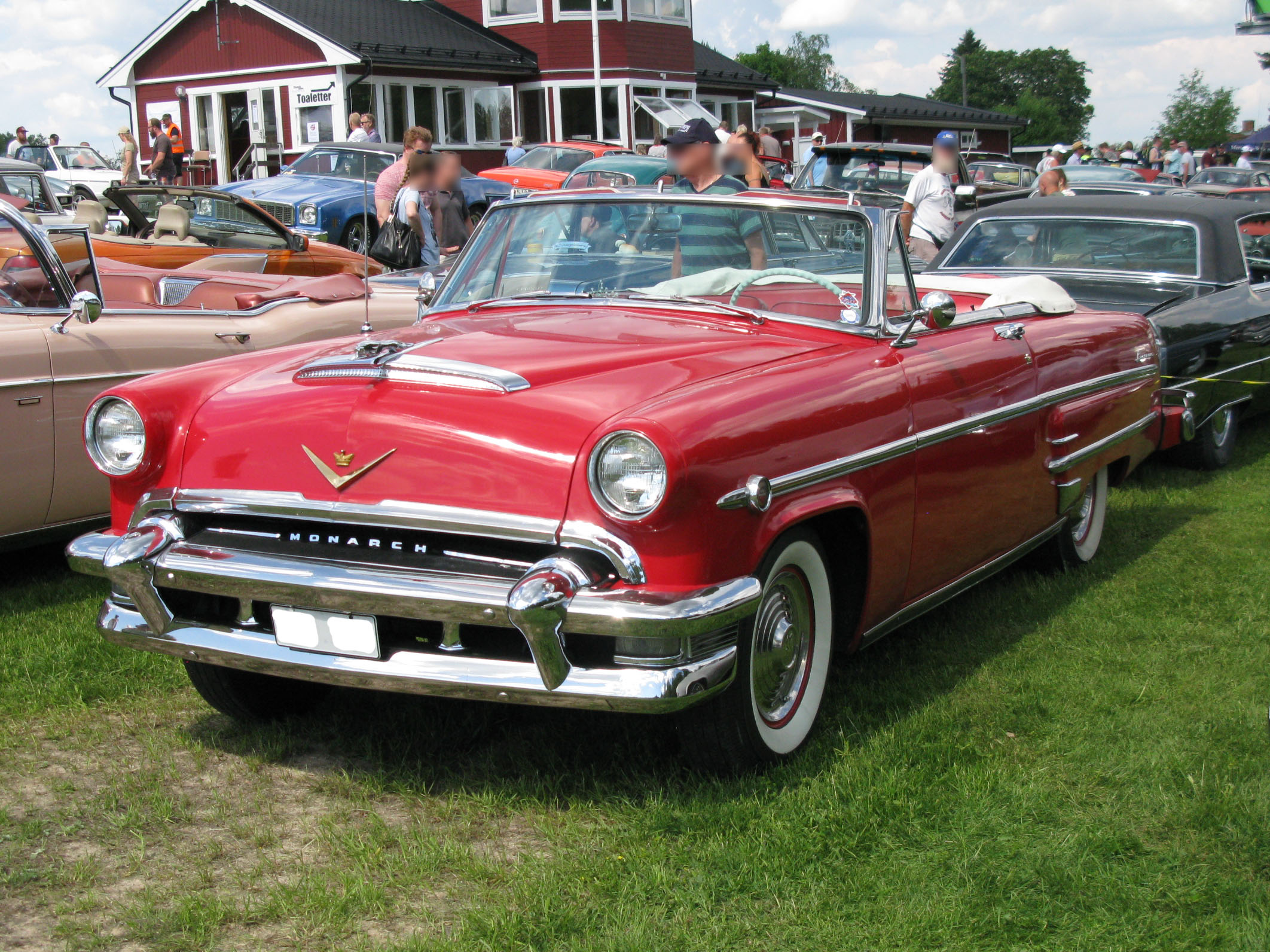
1954 Monarch Lucerne Convertible

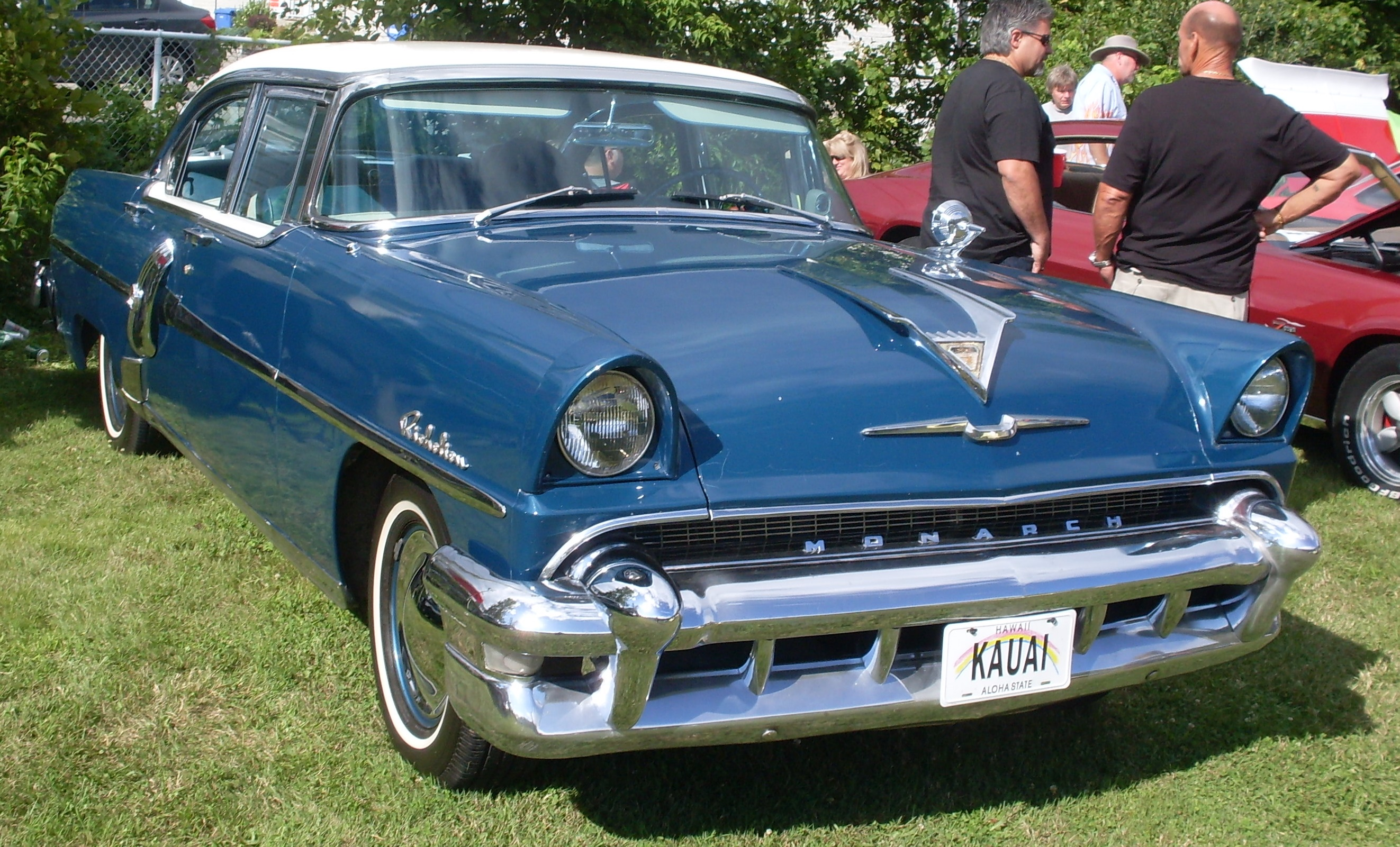
1955 Monarch Richelieu Four-Door Sedan

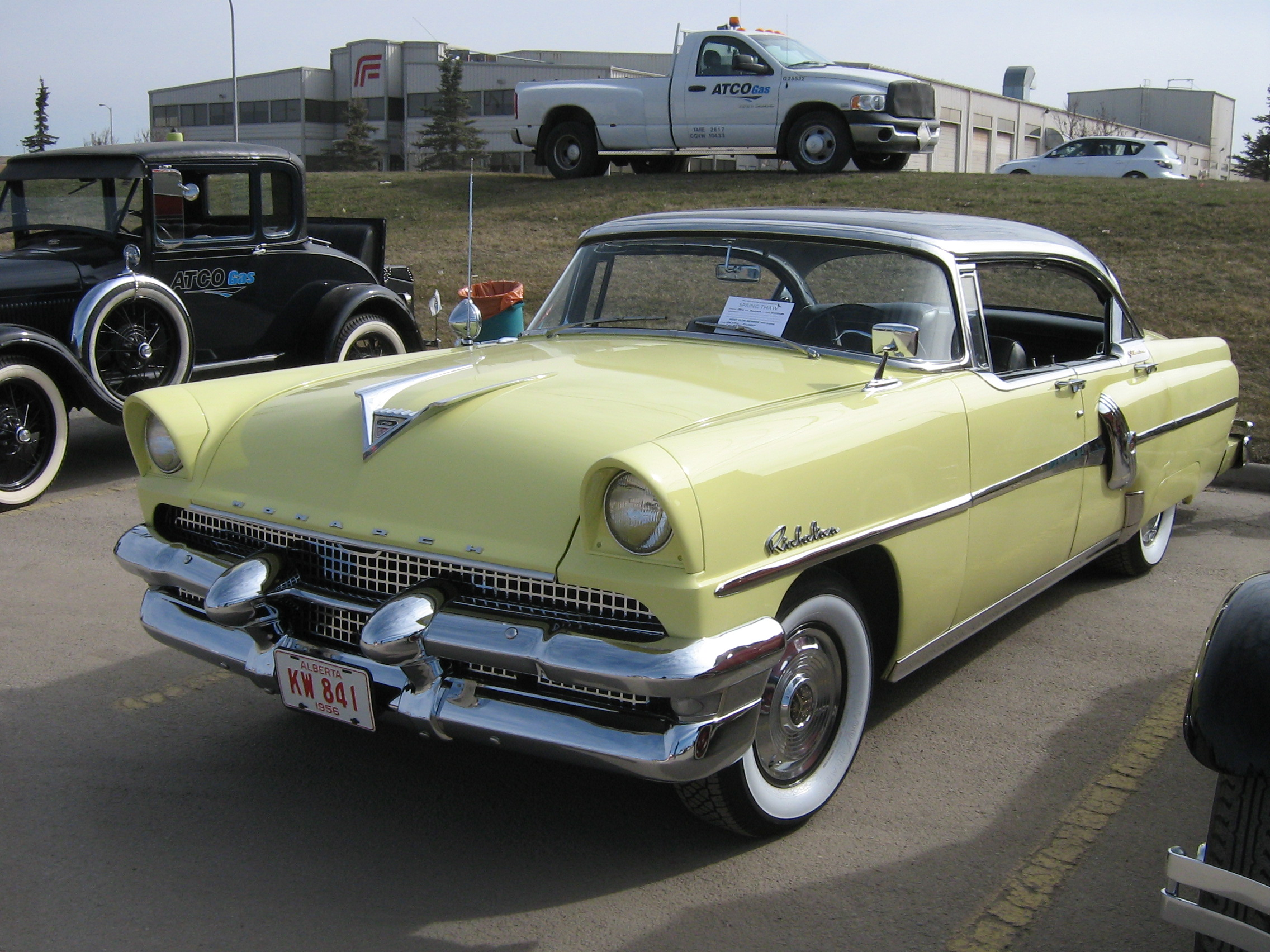
1956 Monarch Richelieu Four-Door Phaeton

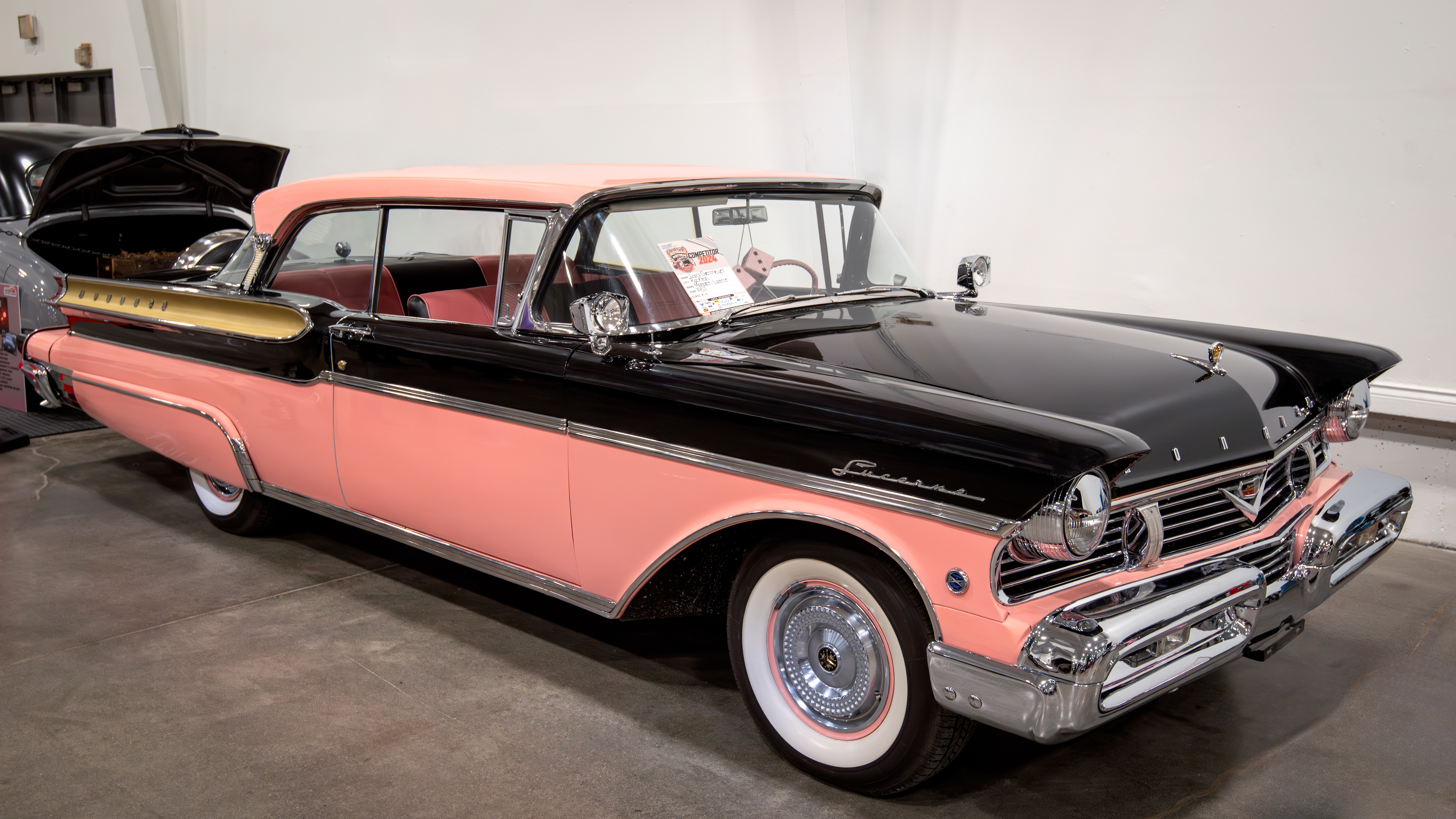
1957 Monarch Lucerne Phaeton Coupe

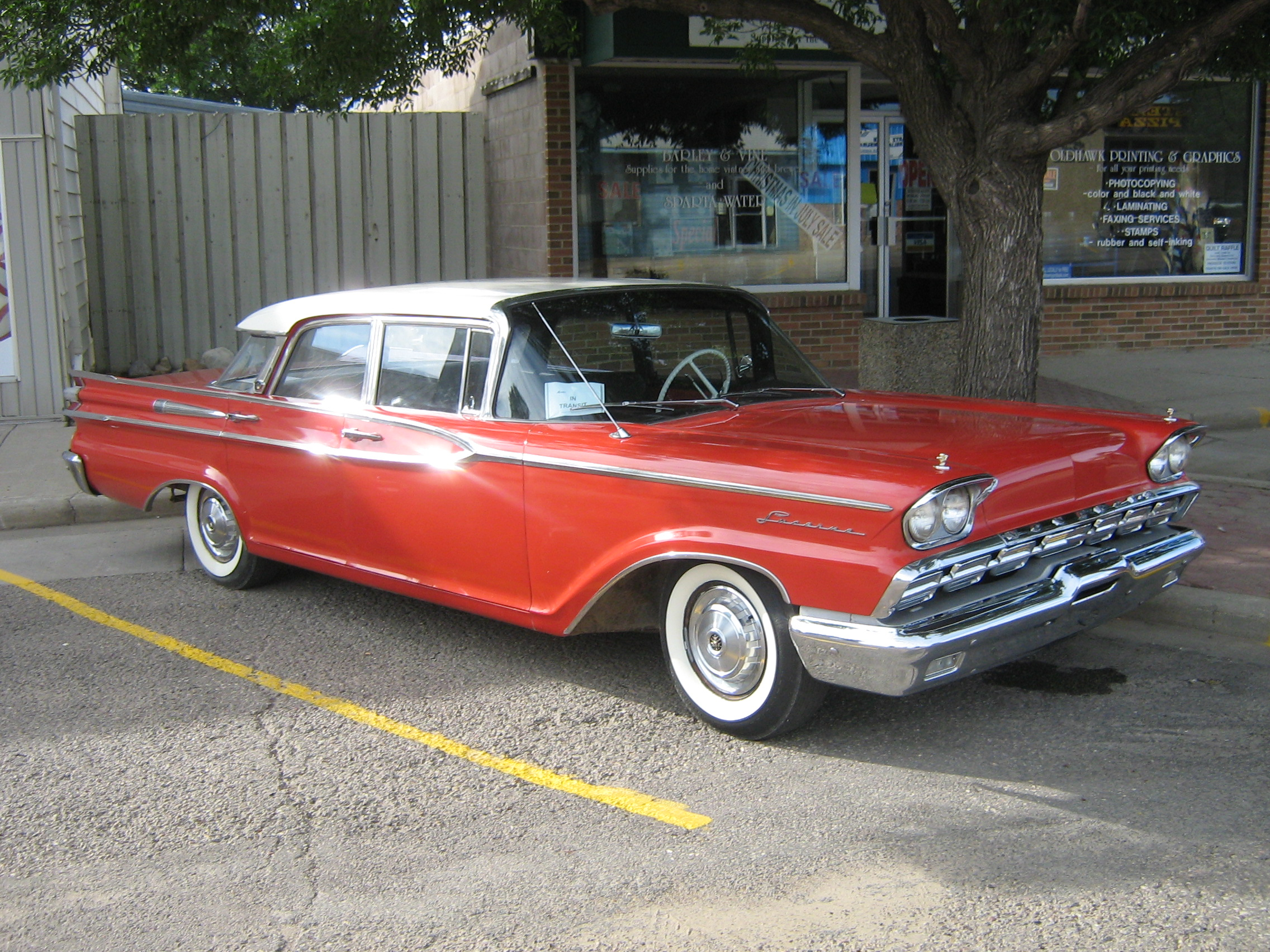
1959 Monarch Lucerne

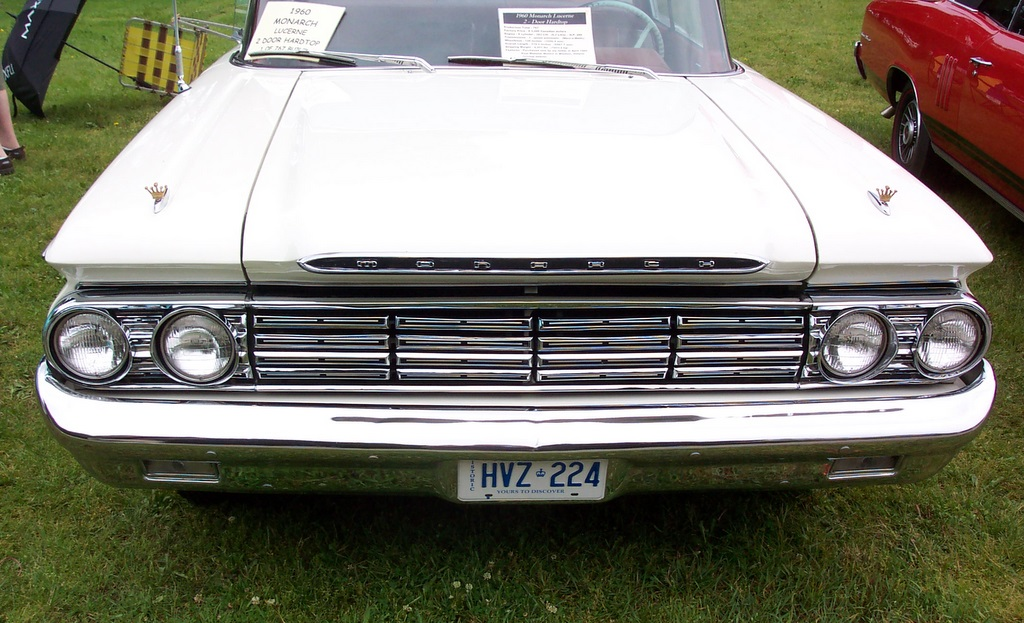
1960 Monarch Lucerne

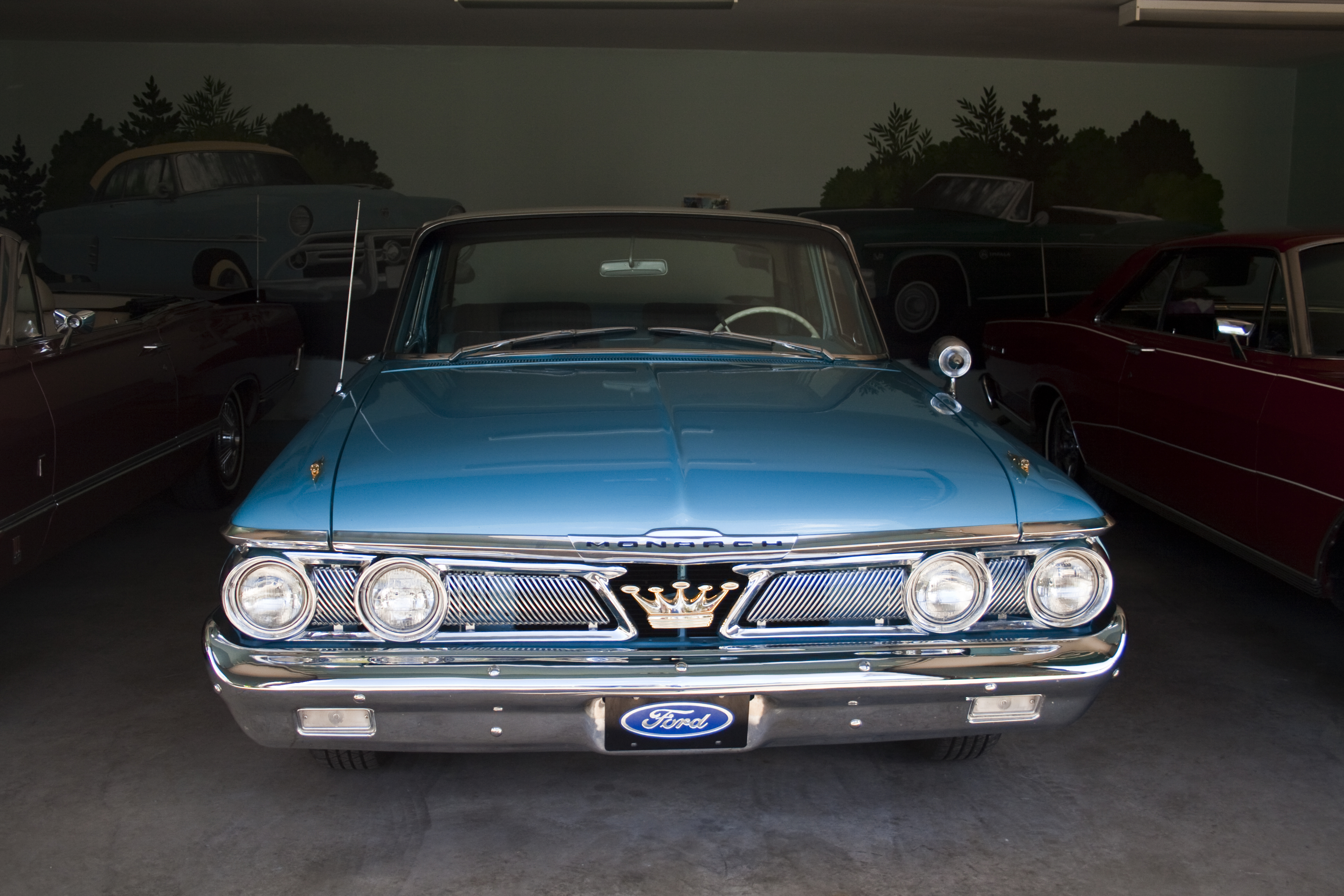
1961 Monarch
