= William H. Osborne =

American businessman

- Born: March 27, 1960 (age 66); Detroit, Michigan, United States
- Education: MBA
- Employer: Navistar Corporation
- Known for: CEO of Federal Signal Corporation
- Title: Senior Vice President
- Board member of: Quaker Chemical Company

William H. Osborne (born March 27, 1960, in Detroit, Michigan, US), former CEO of Federal Signal Corporation, was replaced by Dennis J. Martin on November 1, 2010. Prior to September 2008, he was President and CEO of Ford Canada Limited. He is the former Senior Vice President, Manufacturing & Quality for Navistar Corporation a manufacturer of Commercial Trucks and Senior Vice President, Operations and Quality for Boeing Defense and Space. He retired from the Boeing Company in 2022. Osborne also is a current member of the Board of Directors of Quaker Chemical Corporation, Armstrong World Industries and Invitae Corporation

He holds a Bachelor of Mechanical Engineering from GMI Engineering & Management Institute, an MBA from the University of Chicago and a Master of Mechanical Engineering from Wayne State University.

He has spoken out against a proposed trade agreement between Canada and South Korea. He has warned of a cost-cutting agenda for future pay deals.
