= Huron—Perth =

Former federal electoral district in Ontario, Canada

Ontario electoral district

Defunct federal electoral district
- Legislature: House of Commons
- District created: 1935
- District abolished: 1952
- First contested: 1935
- Last contested: 1949

Huron—Perth was a federal electoral district represented in the House of Commons of Canada from 1935 to 1953. It was located in the province of Ontario. This riding was created in 1933 from parts of Huron South and Perth South ridings.

It was initially defined to consist of the townships of Fullarton and Hibbert in the county of Perth, the townships of Hullett, McKillop, Stanley, Tuckersmith, Hay, Stephen and Usborne in the county of Huron.

In 1947, the riding was expanded to include the township of Logan and the town of Mitchell in the county of Perth.

The electoral district was abolished in 1952 when it was redistributed between Huron and Perth ridings.

== Members of Parliament ==
This riding elected the following members of the House of Commons of Canada:

Parliament	Years	Member	Party
Riding created from Huron South and Perth South
18th	1935–1940	William Henry Golding	Liberal
19th	1940–1945	William Henry Golding	Liberal
20th	1945–1949	William Henry Golding	Liberal
21st	1949–1953	Andrew Young McLean	Liberal
Riding dissolved into Huron and Perth

== Election results ==
1935 Canadian federal election
Party	Candidate	Votes
Liberal	William Henry Golding	6,260
Conservative	Frank Donnelly	3,001
Reconstruction	Robert J. McMillan	1,530

1940 Canadian federal election
Party	Candidate	Votes
Liberal	William Henry Golding	5,622
National Government	James Wilson Morley	3,472

1945 Canadian federal election
Party	Candidate	Votes
Liberal	William Henry Golding	5,645
Progressive Conservative	Thomas Pryde	5,170
Co-operative Commonwealth	George Alexander Cann	353

1949 Canadian federal election
Party	Candidate	Votes
Liberal	Andrew Young McLean	7,000
Progressive Conservative	Elgin McKinley	6,705
Co-operative Commonwealth	John Robert Peters	558

== See also ==
- List of Canadian electoral districts
- Historical federal electoral districts of Canada
