= James Colebrooke Patterson =

Canadian politician

The Honourable James Colebrooke Patterson PC
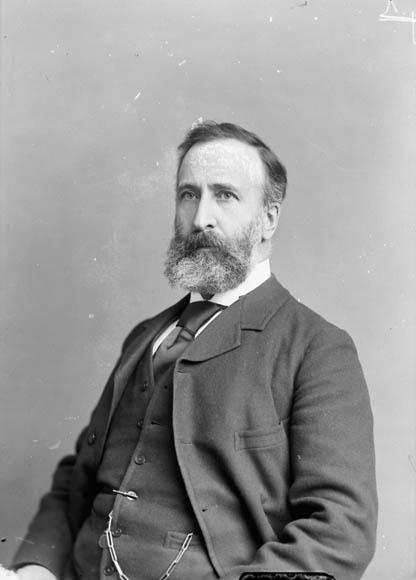

6th Lieutenant Governor of Manitoba
- In office September 2, 1895 – October 9, 1900
- Monarch: Victoria
- Governors General: The Earl of Aberdeen; The Earl of Minto
- Premier: Thomas Greenway; Hugh John Macdonald
- Preceded by: John Christian Schultz
- Succeeded by: Daniel Hunter McMillan

Member of the Canadian Parliament for Huron West
- In office 1892–1895
- Preceded by: Malcolm Colin Cameron
- Succeeded by: Malcolm Colin Cameron

Member of the Canadian Parliament for Essex North
- In office 1882–1891
- Preceded by: Electoral district was created
- Succeeded by: William McGregor

Member of the Canadian Parliament for Essex
- In office 1878–1882
- Preceded by: William McGregor
- Succeeded by: Electoral district was abolished

Member of the Legislative Assembly of Ontario
- In office January 18, 1875 – September 3, 1878
- Preceded by: Electoral district created
- Succeeded by: Solomon White
- Constituency: Essex North

Personal details
- Born: 1839 Armagh, Ireland
- Died: February 17, 1929 (aged 89–90)
- Party: Conservative
- Other political affiliations: Conservative Party of Ontario
- Cabinet: Secretary of State of Canada (1892); Minister of Militia and Defence (1892-1895); Minister Without Portfolio (1895)

James Colebrooke Patterson, PC (1839 – February 17, 1929) was a Canadian politician. He served as a federal cabinet minister from 1892 to 1895 and as the sixth Lieutenant Governor of Manitoba from 1895 to 1900.

== Early life ==
Patterson was born to a Protestant family in Armagh, Ireland, and was educated at Dublin. He moved to Canada in 1857 and entered the civil service, though he later resigned. He subsequently trained in law and was called to the bar in 1876.

== Political career ==
Patterson settled in the Windsor area and held a number of local offices (including a ten-year term as reeve of Windsor). In 1875, he was elected to the Ontario legislature as a Conservative, defeating independent candidate L. Montreuil by 1209 votes to 755 in the riding of Essex North.

In 1878, Patterson resigned his provincial seat to run for the federal House of Commons. He was elected in the riding of Essex, defeating Liberal William McGregor by 2596 votes to 2318.

Patterson became a backbench supporter of Prime Minister John A. Macdonald's government and was re-elected in the federal riding of Essex North in 1882 and 1887. On the former occasion, he defeated J.A. Kilroy by 1714 votes to 1022. On the latter, he defeated Liberal Francis Cleary by 2301 votes to 2165. He also served as president of the Ontario Conservative Union during a part of his time in parliament.

Patterson was defeated in the federal election of 1891, losing to William McGregor by 2892 votes to 2043. In spite of this, he was subsequently called into the cabinet of John Abbott, who became prime minister following Macdonald's death following the 1891 election. He was sworn in as Secretary of State of Canada on January 25, 1892, and was re-elected to parliament on February 22 (defeating Liberal Malcolm Colin Cameron by 25 votes in a Huron West by-election).

When John S.D. Thompson replaced Abbott as prime minister in late 1892, Patterson was transferred to the Ministry of Militia and Defence. He held this position until March 26, 1895 (aside from a nine-day gap in December 1894), having been retained in the position when Mackenzie Bowell replaced Thompson in mid-1894. He sought to bolster Canada's defensive capabilities and oversaw the construction of fortifications in Esquimalt, British Columbia. After stepping down from his ministry in March 1895, he served as a minister without portfolio.

Patterson resigned from cabinet entirely on September 1, 1895, to be sworn in as the new Lieutenant-Governor of Manitoba. This was a period of upheaval in Manitoba's political culture, as the Manitoba Schools Question was in the last stages of its ongoing legal challenges. Patterson was responsible for overseeing the end of most state funding for Catholic and francophone schools, although it is not clear that he played a significant role in the matter. The lieutenant governor's position was largely ceremonial by this time. Patterson does not appear to have re-entered political life when his term ended in 1900.

In addition to his political career, Patterson was also involved in journalism. He was the founder of Canadian Magazine, a work meant to showcase Canada's literary culture.

== Legacy ==
Patterson is commemorated by Paterson Street in Winnipeg, Manitoba.

J. C. Patterson Collegiate Institute in Windsor, Ontario was named after him.

== Electoral history ==
1875 Ontario general election: Essex North
Party	Candidate	Votes	%
Conservative	James Colebrooke Patterson	1,209	61.56
Independent	Luc Montrieul	755	38.44
Turnout		1,964	54.37
Eligible voters		3,612	
Conservative pickup new district.			
Source: Elections Ontario
