= Malcolm Colin Cameron =

Canadian politician

The Honourable Malcolm Colin Cameron QC
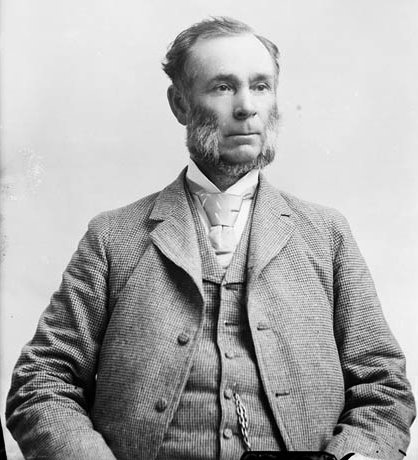

Member of the Canadian Parliament for Huron South
- In office September 20, 1867 – January 22, 1874
- Preceded by: none
- Succeeded by: Thomas Greenway
- In office September 17, 1878 – June 20, 1882
- Preceded by: Thomas Greenway
- Succeeded by: John McMillan

Member of the Canadian Parliament for Huron West
- In office June 20, 1882 – February 22, 1887
- Preceded by: District was created in 1882
- Succeeded by: James Colebrooke Patterson
- In office June 23, 1896 – May 30, 1898
- Preceded by: James Colebrooke Patterson
- Succeeded by: Robert Holmes

7th Lieutenant Governor of the North-West Territories
- In office May 30, 1898 – September 26, 1898
- Monarch: Victoria
- Governor General: The Earl of Aberdeen
- Premier: Frederick W. A. G. Haultain
- Preceded by: Charles Herbert Mackintosh
- Succeeded by: Amédée E. Forget

Personal details
- Born: April 12, 1831 Perth, Ontario, Canada
- Died: September 26, 1898 (aged 67) London, Ontario, Canada
- Party: Liberal
- Spouse: Jessie H. McLean (m. 1856)
- Relations: Malcolm Cameron, father
- Children: 8
- Education: Knox College
- Occupation: lawyer, businessman
- Profession: politician

Malcolm Colin Cameron QC (April 12, 1831 – September 26, 1898) was a businessman and lawyer in Ontario, Canada. He represented Huron South in the House of Commons of Canada from 1867 to 1875 and from 1878 to 1882 and Huron West from 1882 to 1887, 1891 to 1892 and 1896 to 1898.

He was born in Perth in Upper Canada in 1831. He was the probably adopted son of Malcolm Cameron. He attended Knox College in Toronto, later studying law. In 1855, he had moved to Goderich, was called to the bar in 1860, later became part of a law firm there and was appointed Queen's Counsel in 1876. Cameron joined the Goderich town council and later became mayor. In 1867, he was elected to the 1st Canadian Parliament representing Huron South.

His re-election in 1874 was overturned in 1875 but he was elected again in 1878. He defended the interests of the salt industry in the Goderich area in parliament. He took an interest in western Canada, pushing without success for representation in parliament for the North-West Territories and denouncing the hanging of Louis Riel.

In June 1898, he was appointed Lieutenant Governor of the North-West Territories.

He died a few months later in London, Ontario.

His son Malcolm also served as a member of the Ontario assembly and as mayor of Goderich.

Euphemia township in Lambton County, Ontario was named by Cameron in honour of his mother, Euphemia McGregor.
