= Thomas McMillan (Ontario politician) =

Canadian politician

Thomas McMillan (18 March 1864 – 7 June 1932) was a Canadian farmer and politician. He represented Huron South in the House of Commons of Canada as a Liberal from 1925 until his death in 1932.

== Political career ==
McMillan was a farmer before entering federal politics. He first ran for the House of Commons in the 1917 Canadian federal election as a Laurier Liberal candidate in Huron South. He was narrowly defeated by the Unionist candidate, losing by fewer than 600 votes.

In 1919, McMillan sought the leadership of the Ontario Liberal Party at the 1919 Ontario Liberal Party leadership election. The convention was held at Foresters' Hall in Toronto and was won by Hartley Dewart on the second ballot. McMillan received eight votes on the first ballot and was eliminated.

McMillan again ran federally in the 1921 Canadian federal election, this time as the official Liberal candidate in Huron South, but was defeated by 44 votes. He was elected to Parliament in the 1925 Canadian federal election and was re-elected in the 1926 and 1930 elections.

He died in office on 7 June 1932, at the age of 68. A federal by-election was subsequently held in Huron South on 3 October 1932, and the seat was retained by the Liberals.

== Electoral record ==
1917 Canadian federal election: Huron South
Party	Candidate	Votes	%	±%
Unionist Party (Canada)	Jonathan Joseph Merner	3,932		
Laurier Liberals	Thomas McMillan	3,389		

1921 Canadian federal election: Huron South
Party	Candidate	Votes	%	±%
Progressive Party of Canada	William Black	4,105		
Liberal	Thomas McMillan	4,061		
Conservative (historical)	Jonathan Joseph Merner	3,965		

1925 Canadian federal election: Huron South
Party	Candidate	Votes	%	±%
Liberal	Thomas McMillan	4,947		
Conservative (historical)	Jonathan Joseph Merner	4,694		
Progressive Party of Canada	Robert J. McMillan	1,680		

1926 Canadian federal election: Huron South
Party	Candidate	Votes	%	±%
Liberal	Thomas McMillan	6,370		
Conservative (historical)	Andrew Hicks	5,217		

1930 Canadian federal election: Huron South
Party	Candidate	Votes	%	±%
Liberal	Thomas McMillan	6,176		
Conservative (historical)	Nelson W. Trewartha	5,827		
