= Francis Cleary =

Francis Cleary (November 9, 1840 – March 29, 1924) was an Ontario lawyer and political figure. He was mayor of the town of Windsor, Ontario from 1883 to 1885.

He was born near Enniskillen, County Fermanagh, Ireland in 1840, the son of Hugh Cleary, and came to Montreal, Lower Canada with his parents the following year. The family later moved to Toronto where he was educated. Cleary was admitted to the practice of law in 1867 and set up practice in Windsor. In 1871, he married Rose C. Anderson. He served four years as a member of the city council including his term as mayor. He ran unsuccessfully for the federal seat in Essex North in 1887, losing to James Colebrooke Patterson. In 1890, he was an unsuccessful candidate in the same riding for a seat in the provincial assembly. In 1901, he was appointed deputy clerk of the Crown, clerk of the County Court and Surrogate Registrar for Essex County. Cleary also served as president of the Essex County Historical Society.
