= Huron West =

Former federal electoral district in Ontario, Canada

Ontario electoral district

Defunct federal electoral district
- Legislature: House of Commons
- District created: 1882
- District abolished: 1914
- First contested: 1882
- Last contested: 1911

Huron West was a federal electoral district represented in the House of Commons of Canada from 1882 to 1917. It was located in the province of Ontario. This riding was created from parts of Huron Centre, Huron North and Huron South ridings.

The West Riding of the county of Huron was initially defined to consist of the townships of East Wawanosh, West Wawanosh, Ashfield, Colborne and Goderich, and the towns of Goderich and Clinton.

In 1903, it was redefined to include the township of Hullett, and exclude the township of East Wawanosh.

The electoral district was abolished in 1914 when it was redistributed between Huron North and Huron South ridings.

== Members of Parliament ==
This riding has elected the following members of Parliament:

Parliament	Years	Member	Party
Riding created from Huron Centre, Huron North and Huron South
5th	1882–1887	Malcolm Colin Cameron	Liberal
6th	1887–1891	Robert Porter	Liberal–Conservative
7th	1891–1891	Malcolm Colin Cameron	Liberal
7th	1892–1895	James Colebrooke Patterson	Conservative
7th	1896–1896	Malcolm Colin Cameron	Liberal
8th	1896–1898	Malcolm Colin Cameron	Liberal
8th	1899–1900	Robert Holmes	Liberal
9th	1900–1904	Robert Holmes	Liberal
10th	1904–1908	Edward Norman Lewis	Conservative
11th	1908–1911	Edward Norman Lewis	Conservative
12th	1911–1917	Edward Norman Lewis	Conservative
Riding dissolved into Huron North and Huron South

== Election results ==
1882 Canadian federal election
Party	Candidate	Votes
Liberal	Malcolm Colin Cameron	1,736
Liberal–Conservative	Robert Porter	1,707

1887 Canadian federal election
Party	Candidate	Votes
Liberal–Conservative	Robert Porter	2,165
Liberal	Malcolm Colin Cameron	2,139

1891 Canadian federal election
Party	Candidate	Votes
Liberal	Malcolm Colin Cameron	2,199
Liberal–Conservative	Robert Porter	1,820

On Mr. Cameron being unseated, 26 December 1891:

By-election on 22 February 1892
Party	Candidate	Votes
Conservative	James Colebrooke Patterson
Liberal	Malcolm Colin Cameron

On Mr. Patterson being named Lieutenant-Governor of Manitoba, 2 September 1895:

By-election on 14 January 1896
Party	Candidate	Votes
Liberal	Malcolm Colin Cameron	acclaimed

1896 Canadian federal election
Party	Candidate	Votes
Liberal	Malcolm Colin Cameron	1,837
Conservative	Robert McLean	1,520
Patrons of Industry	G. Mcl. Kilty	725

On Mr. Cameron's appointment as Lieutenant-Governor of the North West Territories, May 30, 1898:

By-election on 21 February 1899
Party	Candidate	Votes
Liberal	Robert Holmes	2,274
Conservative	Robert McLean	2,134

1900 Canadian federal election
Party	Candidate	Votes
Liberal	Robert Holmes	2,163
Conservative	Robert McLean	2,143

1904 Canadian federal election
Party	Candidate	Votes
Conservative	Edward Norman Lewis	2,263
Liberal	Robert Holmes	2,150

1908 Canadian federal election
Party	Candidate	Votes
Conservative	Edward Norman Lewis	2,137
Liberal	Robert Holmes	2,075

1911 Canadian federal election
Party	Candidate	Votes
Conservative	Edward Norman Lewis	2,024
Liberal	Malcolm Graeme Cameron	1,849

== See also ==
- List of Canadian electoral districts
- Historical federal electoral districts of Canada
