= Andrew Young McLean =

Canadian politician (1909–1988)

Andrew Young McLean (June 24, 1909 – August 14, 1988) was a Canadian newspaper publisher and political figure in Ontario. He represented Huron—Perth in the House of Commons of Canada as a Liberal member from 1949 to 1953.

He was born in Seaforth, Ontario, the son of Keith M. McLean and the grandson of Murdo Young McLean, and attended the School of Architecture at the University of Toronto. In 1934, he was named a justice of the peace for Huron County. McLean served as a squadron leader in the Royal Canadian Air Force during World War II. He became editor and publisher of the Huron Expositor after his father's death in 1948. He was a member of the Canadian delegation to the United Nations in 1952. McLean was an unsuccessful candidate for the Huron seat in the House of Commons in 1953 and 1957. He served as president of the Ontario Weekly Newspapers Association from 1967 to 1968 and of the Canadian Community Newspapers Association from 1973 to 1974. In 1986, he was editor of the Huron County Atlas published by Huron County.

His daughter Susan was editor for the Expositor when it was sold in 1982.

Parliament of Canada
Preceded by William Henry Golding	Member of Parliament for Huron—Perth; 1949–1953	Succeeded by The electoral district was abolished in 1952.
