= Ford Motor Company of Canada =

Canadian subsidiary company

Ford Motor Company of Canada, Limited

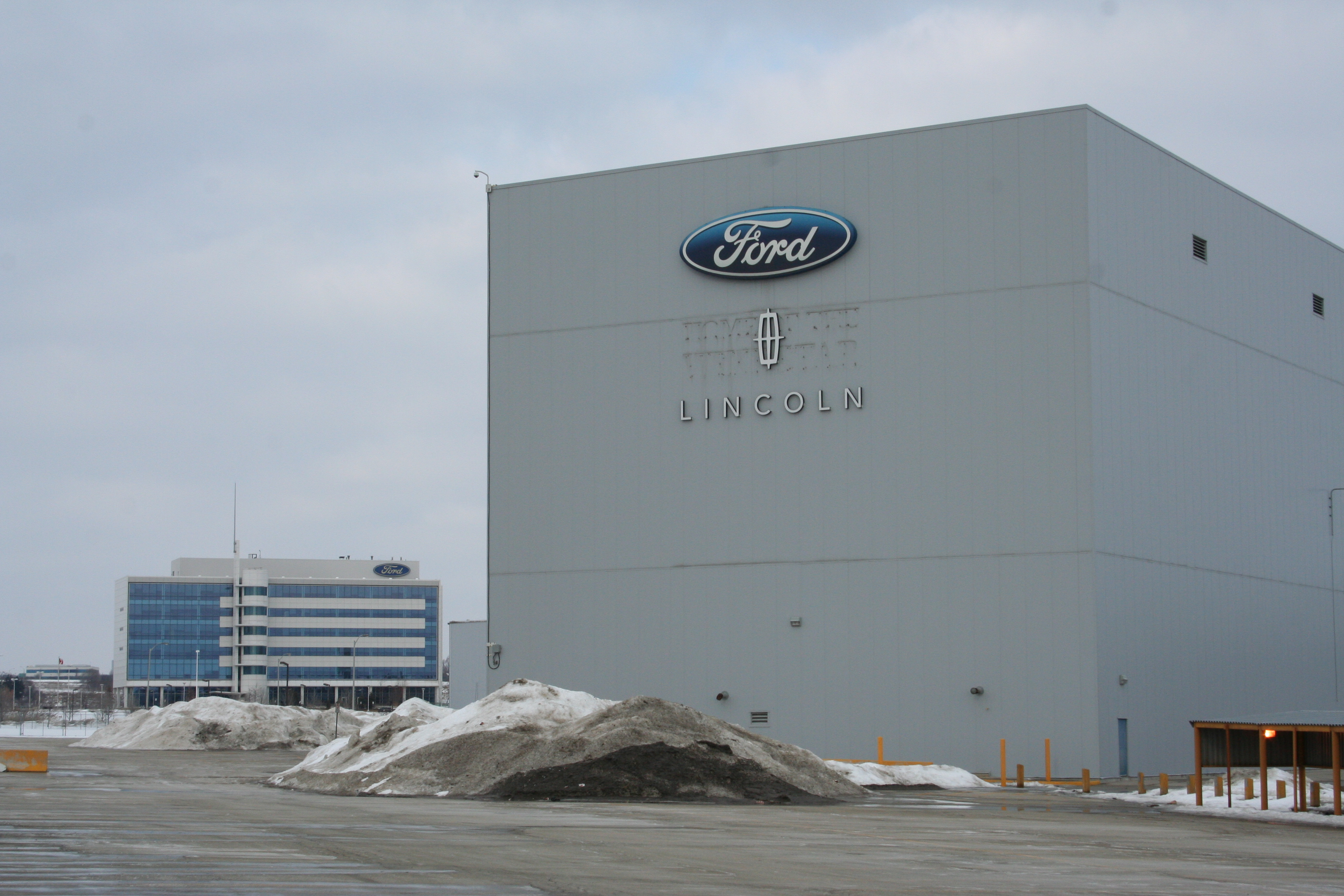
- Ford Canada head office with the Oakville plant at right in 2009
- Type: Subsidiary
- Industry: Automotive
- Founded: 1904; 122 years ago
- Founder: Gordon Morton McGregor; Henry Ford
- Headquarters: Oakville, Ontario, Canada
- Area served: Canada, U.S.
- Products: Automobiles, pickups
- Services: Automotive finance, Vehicle leasing, Vehicle service
- Revenue: see Ford Motor Company for details
- Parent: Ford Motor Company
- Divisions: Lincoln Canada
- Website: ford.ca

Ford Motor Company of Canada, Limited (French: Ford du Canada Limitée) was founded on August 17, 1904, for the purpose manufacturing and selling Ford cars in Canada. It was originally known as the Walkerville Wagon Works and was located in Walkerville, Ontario (now part of Windsor, Ontario). The founder, Gordon Morton McGregor, convinced a group of investors to invest in Henry Ford's new automobile, which was being produced across the river in Detroit, Michigan.

The firm manufactures and sells cars in Canada, and also in the United States and other countries around the world.

== History ==
The Ford Motor Company of Canada is a wholly owned subsidiary of Ford Motor Company, although it once had its own distinct group of shareholders. At its formation, Ford Motor Company was not a shareholder of Ford Canada, but its twelve founding shareholders directly held 51% of Ford Canada's shares, and Henry Ford himself owned 13% of the new company. The company had gained all Ford patent rights and selling privileges to all parts of the British Empire, except Great Britain and Ireland. It eventually established and managed the following subsidiaries:

- Ford Motor Company of Southern Africa
- Ford India
- Ford Australia
- Ford New Zealand

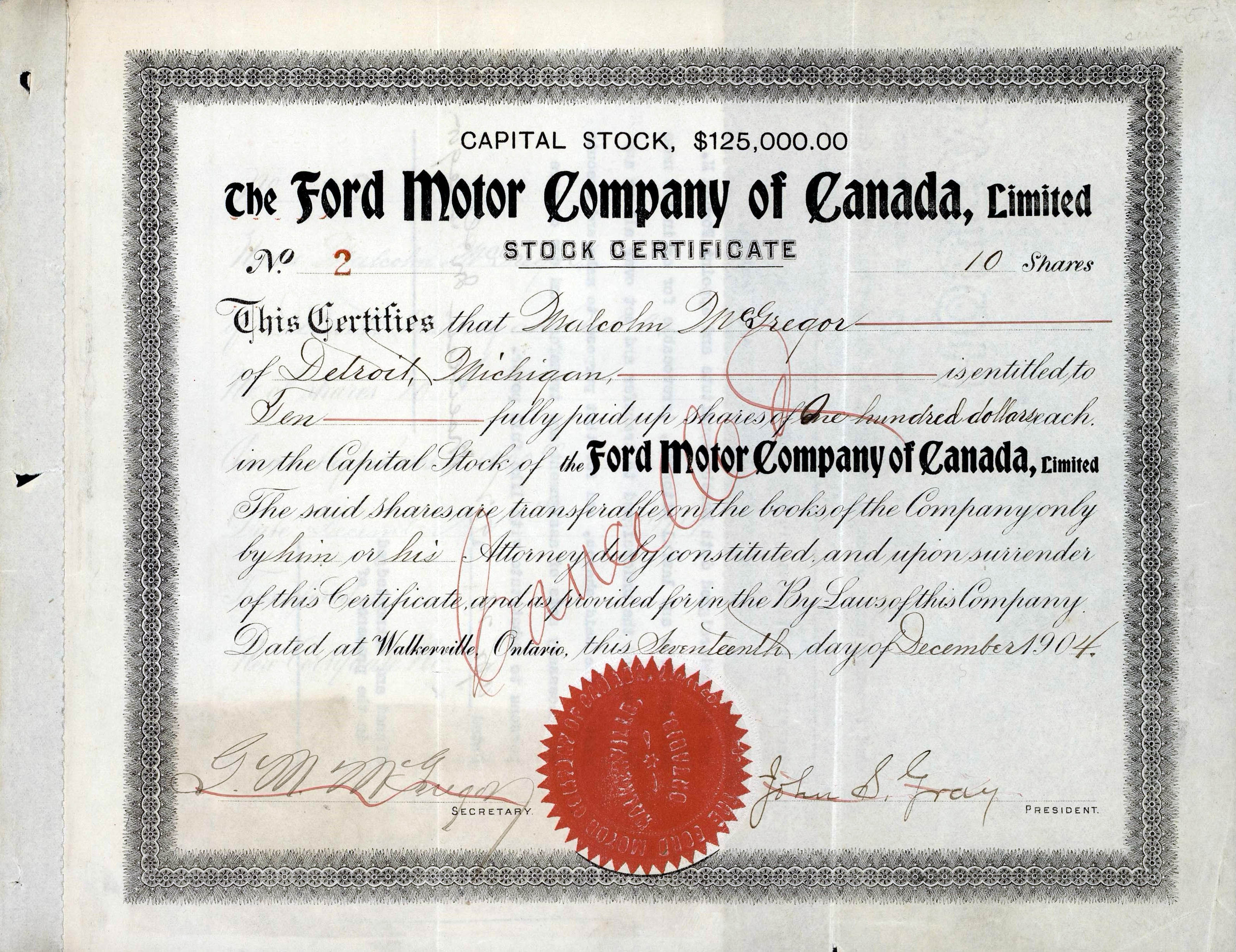
Stock certificate of the Ford Motor Company of Canada, Ltd., issued 17 December 1904

The Model C, the first car to be produced in Canada, rolled out of the factory in late September 1904. The company could produce two cars at a time and in its first full year of production, the company was able to produce 117 automobiles. The company's first export sales were to Calcutta, India. Ford is still an important manufacturing enterprise in Windsor.

With the growth in car sales after World War II, together with the acquisition of majority control by Ford Motor Company, Ford of Canada decided to move its head office and build a new assembly plant in Oakville, Ontario. The new Oakville assembly plant was opened in 1953. In order to meet ever increasing demand, the Company opened another assembly plant in Talbotville, Ontario, in 1967.

Historically Ford was one of the most powerful companies in Canada, and in the 1970s, Ford was the "largest" company in Canada.

By 1989, during a peak in the environmental movement, the Ford Motor Company of Canada (particularly its Oakville plant) was listed among the "dirty dozen" polluters in Ontario:

"Ford broke lots of rules with the 13.8 million litres of waste it pumped into Lake Ontario every day until a few months ago, when it began a two-stage cleaning process.

"The company used to flush out an average of 392 kilograms (875 pounds) of solids with that waste water every day. It also poured out chemicals that sucked oxygen out of the lake. Ford also had on-and-off problems with the amounts of phosphorus (the chemical largely responsible for nearly killing Lake Erie decades ago) and phenols it discharged.

"The first stage of cleaning up this mess was a $6.8-million, upgraded version of the treatment system it already had on its site. The second stage sends waste water through Halton Region's sewers, so that no water is flowing directly into the lake."

Ford of Canada celebrated its Centennial in 2004, shortly after the Parent Company Ford in the United States did in 2003. That year also saw the compulsory acquisition by Ford Motor Company of the last of the shares held by minority shareholders, which had been originally proposed in 1995. However, the last litigation in the matter, dealing with an oppression remedy claim by the Ontario Municipal Employees Retirement System with respect to its shareholdings, was only resolved by the Ontario Court of Appeal in January 2006.

In 2010, Ford was embroiled in a controversy surrounding a plan to construct a massive gas-fired power plant to be operated by TransCanada on a disused 13.5-acre (55,000 m^{2}) portion of its Oakville assembly plant. Local residents and politicians pleaded with Ford not to continue with the plan, as residents believed it would negatively impact their health and safety. The province cancelled the generating station in October 2010 and both Ford and TransCanada withdrew their planned appeals to the Ontario Municipal Board the following January. The plant was one of two involved in the Ontario power plant scandal, which contributed to the resignation of Premier Dalton McGuinty and Energy Minister Chris Bentley.

== Key executives ==
In 2021, Bev Goodman became president/CEO of Ford Motor Company of Canada, replacing Dean Stoneley who has been appointed as general manager, North America truck, Ford Motor Company, a newly created position. Previous CEO's include Mark Buzzell who replaced Diane Craig effective January 1, 2017.

Before Craig, Mondragon had served as president and CEO since September 1, 2008, when he replaced Barry Engle who resigned to join New Holland America as its CEO. William H. Osborne had held the position since 2005 and was replaced by Engle in February 2008.

== Facilities ==
=== Current ===
Plant	Location	Employees	Year opened	Year closed	Notes
Oakville Assembly Complex	Oakville, Ontario	3550	1953	Still active	Also Canadian Headquarters
Windsor Engine Plant	Windsor, Ontario	950	1978 (original engine plant opened in 1923)	Main building closed, annex still active	Produces 7.3L V8 engine for Super Duty pickups and commercial vehicles
Essex Engine Plant	Windsor, Ontario	930	1981–2007; reopened late 2009	Still Active	Flexible engine plant, produces 5.0L V8 engine for Mustang and F-150

=== Former ===
Plant	Location	Year opened	Year closed	Notes
Windsor Casting Plant	Windsor, Ontario	1934	May 30, 2007	Now Demolished
Essex Aluminum Plant	Windsor, Ontario	1981	February 13, 2009	Built originally to make cylinder heads for Essex Engine Plant, later as joint venture with Alfa SA of Mexico subsidiary Nemak; once produced engines for Mustangs, E-series vans and F-series trucks
Ontario Truck Plant	Oakville, Ontario	1965	2004	retooled and reopened as part of Oakville Car Plant
Walkerville Plant	Windsor, Ontario	1904	1954	At foot of Drouillard Road and Riverside Drive East; former Canadian Headquarters before move to Oakville and main assembly operations also known as Plant 1; two storey brick structure demolished 1969 and now abandoned lands facing the Detroit River
St. Thomas Assembly Plant	Talbotville, Ontario	1968	September 2011	Only production facility for the Crown Victoria Police Interceptor for fleet orders, Grand Marquis and Lincoln Town Car for limo operators.
Niagara Falls glass plant	Niagara Falls, Ontario	1961	1994	The factory used to produce windshields, windows and lights for cars and trucks from plate and sheet glass provided by suppliers. The plant produced parts for the Canadian and American operations.
Dupont St Assembly Plant	Toronto, Ontario	1910	1927	Assembly relocated to Danforth Plant. The building (672 Dupont St) now houses Condominiums
Danforth Avenue Plant	Toronto, Ontario	1922	1946	Sold to Nash Motors and then by American Motors Corporation 1954 to 1961. Converted as mall, Shoppers World Danforth.
Portage Ave Assembly Plant	Winnipeg, Manitoba	1915	1941	Now known as the Robert Fletcher Building
Hamilton St Assembly Plant	Vancouver, British Columbia	1919	1938	Production moved to Burnaby plant in 1938
Burnaby Assembly Plant	Burnaby, British Columbia	1938	1968	Building demolished in 1988 to build Station Square
Montreal Assembly Plant	Montreal, Quebec	1916	1932	

== Vehicles produced ==
Ford Canada has produced the following models over the years:

Model	Oakville	St. Thomas	Walkerville
Canadian Military Pattern truck (World War II)			✓
Edsel Citation	✓		
Edsel Pacer	✓		
Edsel Corsair	✓		
Edsel Ranger	✓		
Ford Crown Victoria		✓	
Ford Custom 500	✓		
Ford Econoline	✓		
Ford Edge	✓		
Ford Escort/Mercury Lynx	✓		
Ford Crown Victoria		✓	
Ford EXP/Mercury LN7		✓	
Ford F-150	✓		
Ford Fairmont/Mercury Zephyr		✓	
Ford Falcon	✓	✓	
Ford Flex	✓		
Ford Freestar	✓		
Ford SVT Lightning (2nd Generation)	✓		
Ford LTD	✓		
Ford LTD Crown Victoria		✓	
Ford Maverick	✓	✓	
Ford Model A			✓
Ford Model C			✓
Ford Model K			✓
Ford Model N			✓
Ford Model T			✓
Ford Pinto/Mercury Bobcat		✓	
Ford Super Duty	✓		
Ford Tempo/Mercury Topaz	✓		
Ford Torino	✓		
Ford Windstar	✓		
Frontenac	✓		
Lincoln MKT	✓		
Lincoln MKX	✓		
Lincoln Nautilus	✓		
Lincoln Town Car		✓	
Mercury Comet	✓		
Mercury Grand Marquis		✓	
Mercury Marauder		✓	
Mercury Meteor	✓		✓
Mercury Monarch	✓		
Mercury Monterey (Minivan)	✓		
Meteor (various models)			
Monarch (various models)			
