= Robert Porter (Ontario politician) =

Robert Porter (January 29, 1833 - July 27, 1901) was a Canadian Member of Parliament for the riding of Huron West under the Liberal-Conservative Party.
