= Robert Holmes (Canadian politician) =

Canadian politician

Robert Holmes (September 14, 1852 – March 21, 1932) was a publisher and political figure in Ontario, Canada. He represented Huron West in the House of Commons of Canada from 1899 to 1904 as a Liberal.

He was born in St. Catharines, Canada West. He was mayor of Trenton for four years. Holmes was first elected to the House of Commons in an 1899 by-election held after Malcolm Colin Cameron was named Lieutenant-Governor of the Northwest Territories. He ran unsuccessfully for re-election to the House of Commons in 1904 and 1908.
