= Gordon McGregor (cricketer) =

New Zealand cricketer

Personal information
- Full name: Gordon George McGregor
- Born: 4 January 1915; Dunedin, Otago, New Zealand
- Died: 24 October 1982 (aged 67); Dunedin, Otago, New Zealand
- Batting: Right-handed
- Bowling: Right-arm

Domestic team information
- Years: Team
- 1935/36–1939/40: Otago
- Source: ESPNcricinfo, 15 May 2016

Gordon George McGregor (4 January 1915 – 24 October 1982) was a New Zealand cricketer. He played four first-class matches for Otago between the 1935–36 and 1939–40 seasons.

McGregor was born at Dunedin in 1915. Professionally he worked as a civil servant. He made his representative debut for Otago in the team's final Plunket Shield match of the 1935–36 season, playing against Canterbury at Christchurch. His score of 32 not out in his first first-class innings remained his top score at provincial level.

After playing in Otago's first two Shield matches of the 1936–37 season, McGregor dropped out of the side, returning for a single match in the 1939–40 season. He played occasional other matches for the team at lower levels. In his four first-class matches he scored a total of 67 runs and did not take a wicket.

McGregor died at Dunedin in 1982. He was aged 67.
