= Gordon Morton McGregor =

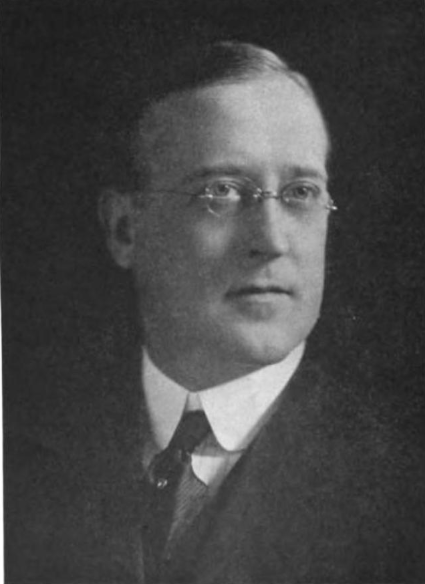
- Born: January 18, 1873; Windsor, Ontario
- Died: March 11, 1922 (aged 49); Montreal, Quebec
- Occupation: Businessman
- Spouse: Harriett Dodds (m. 1898)
- Children: 5
- Father: William McGregor

Gordon Morton McGregor (January 18, 1873 – March 11, 1922) was a Canadian businessman who founded the Ford Motor Company of Canada in 1904.

== Background ==
His father was William McGregor, president of the Walkerville Wagon Company Limited in Walkerville, Ontario – now part of Windsor, Ontario. Gordon McGregor took over the management of the company in 1901, and on the death of his father in 1903, he became president of the company.

At a meeting with his brothers, Walter and Donald, in January 1904, Gordon McGregor said:

There are men in Detroit who say every farmer will soon be using an automobile. I don't see why we can not build them here in the wagon factory.

== Agreement with Henry Ford ==
Meetings with Henry Ford resulted in McGregor obtaining a personal agreement that allowed him to form and finance a company to manufacture and sell Ford products in Canada.

Additionally, he obtained the right to sell Ford products in the then-existing British Empire, exclusive of the British Isles. This farsightedness on the part of McGregor resulted in Ford of Canada having wholly owned subsidiaries in South Africa, New Zealand and Australia.

== Ford of Canada ==
Production of Ford automobiles in Canada started in the Wagon Works on October 10, 1904. The 1904 Ford Model C was the first car built at the plant.

In addition to building the business, he actively developed people. A young man, Wallace R. Campbell, whom he hired as bookkeeper, showed promise and was developed to become McGregor's assistant. When McGregor died, Campbell took over and ran Ford of Canada.

== Personal life ==
On November 2, 1898, he married Harriett Dodds. They had five children – two sons, Gordon and William, and three daughters, Harriett, Elizabeth and Nancy.

== Death ==
McGregor died at Royal Victoria Hospital in Montreal on March 11, 1922. The cause of death was reported as intestinal trouble arising from an old injury suffered in a railway accident; the family believed it was cancer; pathological study points to a rare blood-vessel disorder.

== Legacy ==
McGregor saw the company he founded expand from producing 117 cars in its first fiscal year, to 51,341 in 1922. This resulted in almost seven out of 10 cars sold in Canada being built by Ford of Canada. He saw his company become the first automobile manufacturer in Canada to build the complete automobile from raw material to the finished product.

There was a Gordon McGregor Public Elementary School in Windsor, Ontario.
