= George McEwen =

Canadian politician

George McEwen (11 May 1849 – 28 December 1913) was a Scottish-born farmer, grain merchant and political figure in Ontario, Canada. He represented Huron South in the House of Commons of Canada from 1900 to 1904 as a Liberal.

He was born in Glasgow, the son of Peter McEwen and Isabella Schanter, and was educated in Perth County, Ontario. McEwen also manufactured salt and flax. He was reeve for Hay Township and warden of Huron County.
