= Jonathan Joseph Merner =

Canadian politician

Jonathan Joseph Merner (April 2, 1864 – February 26, 1929) was a farmer, merchant and political figure in Ontario, Canada. He represented Huron South in the House of Commons of Canada from 1911 to 1921 as a Conservative.

He was born in Blake, Canada West, the son of Gottlieb Merner and Enélie Brossoit, and was educated in Hay Township. He established himself as a farmer and merchant at Zurich. In 1900, Merner married Clara Edith Graham. In the 1911 federal election, he campaigned against reciprocity in trade with the United States, arguing that the local trade in horses and salt would suffer. From 1917 to 1921, Merner was a Unionist Party member. Merner ran unsuccessfully for reelection to the House of Commons in 1921 and 1925. He died in Windsor at the age of 64.
