= Ontario Liberal Party leadership elections =

Canadian provincial political party elections

Ontario Liberal Party leadership election
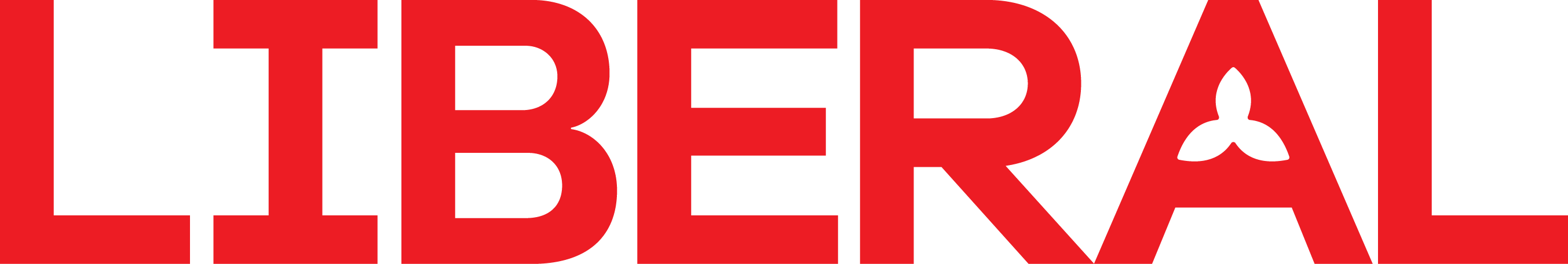

The Ontario Liberal Party has elected its party leader through contested elections from as early as 1907. The leaders elected by these contests simultaneously assumed the roles of formal organization chief of the Ontario Liberal Party (OLP) as a political organization, presumptive ranking member of the Ontario Liberal caucus at the Legislative Assembly of Ontario, and the party's designated candidate for the premiership of Ontario. As one of the two principal contenders for power for much of Ontario's history, its leadership comes with a reasonable prospect for Ontario's premiership, making its leadership contests competitive historically.

The election method used for such leadership contests evolved over the party's history, with rank-and-file members gradually gaining influence over its outcome at the expense of its parliamentary caucus and figures in the party apparatus. Leadership contests are not held by OLP on fixed or regular interval but are conducted as needed upon leadership vacancy. Once elected, a leader's tenure in theory has no fixed end date and is subject only to leadership review votes held following each general election.

The Ontario Liberal Party hold two related distinctions in this area: it was both the first and the last political party with parliamentary representation anywhere in Canada to have elected its leader via a delegated leadership convention. The two conventions were held almost exactly a hundred years apart, respectively in June 1919 and March 2020.

== History ==
=== Selection on deference to former or outgoing leader ===
Even though he was never elected to either the Canadian House of Commons or the Ontario Legislature, George Brown, the spiritual founder of both the Ontario and national Liberal Party, loomed large over Liberal politicians in active service during the years immediately following Canadian Confederation. The first three leaders of the Ontario Liberal Party, Archibald McKellar, Edward Blake and Oliver Mowat, were all close allies of Brown before Confederation, and their association with Brown was a key determinative factor in their emergence and acceptance as Ontario Liberal leader. Brown's influence was most evident in the 1872 installation of Mowat, Brown's most trusted advisor and legal strategist during the negotiations that led to confederation, as leader and provincial premier despite having been out of electoral politics for close to a decade.

Mowat held the party leadership and Ontario premiership for 24 years and effectively determined the selection of the party's next two leaders, Arthur Sturgis Hardy and George William Ross. When Mowat resigned the premiership to become Justice Minister in the Laurier ministry in Ottawa, Hardy and Ross were respectively the most senior and the second most senior cabinet member remaining. By the time Hardy retired just three years later, Mowat had been installed as Ontario's Lieutenant Governor, allowing him to formally oversee the transition of power to Ross.

=== Selection by caucus behind close doors ===
After a thirty four year run in government, the Liberal Party led by Ross faced its second defeat since confederation at the 1905 election. Ross remained leader for another two years. As the leader who led the party into opposition, Ross lacked the authority to designate or the desire to impose his choice of successor, allow a shift of the selection authority to the parliamentary caucus.

The shift did not just occur by default, however. The question on the proper leader selection procedure attracted much speculation immediately following Ross' nomination to the senate. The Mail and Empire, the leading pro-Conservative daily newspaper in Toronto, inferred a plot by senior leaders in the national party to install one of their favorites. The Toronto Daily Star in the other hand speculated a concerted push by rank-and-file members for a convention to both elect the next leader and set campaign policies. Neither materialized, but the parliamentary caucus responded swiftly in any event. Two former caucus members, former Attorney General Frank Latchford and J.R. Stratton made chance appearance at the lobby of the King Edward Hotel, a spot frequent by journalists, and were quoted asserting caucus's suitability for such a selection and questioning a convention's legitimacy in such matter.

The parliamentary caucus prevailed, and selected not one but two successive leaders in 1907, George Perry Graham in January and Aleaxander Grant MacKay in September. Both were younger members elevated by Ross into cabinet in the dying days of the Ross ministry. In both instances, multiple options were reportedly nominated and discussed by caucus behind close door. Both in their mid 40s, Graham and MacKay were each chosen despite the presence of the candidacy of a senior colleague with over a decade of cabinet experience, signaling the caucus prioritization of youthful outlook over proven experience.

=== Delegated convention ===
Following Newton Rowell's defection to accept a cabinet post in Robert Borden's Unionist ministry, the Ontario Liberal Party convened a delegate leadership convention in June 1919, and elected Hartley Dewart, a lawyer and the first Liberal MPP elected from a Toronto riding in over 50 years when he won a 1916 byelection. The convention, held six weeks ahead of the national Liberal party's first leadership convention that elected William Lyon Mackenzie King, was the first instance of a Canadian political party electing its leader through a delegated convention.

The party continued the practice of delegated leadership convention for exactly a hundred years. In 2020, long after the delegated convention out of fashion and abandoned by other political parties across Canada, the Ontario Liberals held its last convention in March 2020 and elected Steven Del Duca, on the weekend immediately before COVID-19 effectively shut down all in-person events.

== Balloting results of leadership elections ==
Eliminated from next round Withdrew nomination Elected leader

== 1919 leadership convention ==
(Held on June 26, 1919 at the Foresters' Hall, 22 College Street, Toronto.)

Delegate support by ballot
| Candidate | Ballot 1 | | Ballot 2 | | |
| Name | Votes | % | Votes | % | +/- (pp) |
|---|---|---|---|---|---|
| Hartley Dewart | 147 | 47.1% | 158 | 52.1% | +5.0 |
| J. C. Tolmie | 97 | 31.1% | 121 | 39.9% | +8.8 |
| J. C. Elliott | 37 | 11.9% | 24 | 7.9% | -4.0 |
| William Proudfoot | 23 | 7.4% | Eliminated | | |
| Thomas McMillan | 8 | 2.6% | Eliminated | | |
Votes cast and net change by ballot
| Total | 312 | 100.0% | 303 | 100.0% | -9 |

Charles Martin Bowman, MPP for Bruce North; W.T.R. Preston, editor of the Port Hope Evening Guide, Rev. W. G. Charlton of Aylmer, and A. J. Young of Toronto were nominated but declined. Frederick Forsyth Pardee, Member of Parliament for Lambton West was to be nominated but sent a message to the convention declining.

== 1922 leadership convention ==
(Held on March 3, 1922 at the Foresters' Hall, 22 College Street, Toronto.)

| Candidate | Votes | % |
|---|---|---|
| Wellington Hay | majority | 50+ |
| J.C. Tolmie | n/a | n/a |
| W.E.N. Sinclair | n/a | n/a |
| Total | n/a | 100.0 |

(Note: The vote totals do not appear to have been announced.)

== 1930 leadership convention ==
(Held on December 16–17, 1930 at the King Edward Hotel in Toronto.)

| Candidate | Votes | % |
|---|---|---|
| Mitchell Hepburn | 427 | 81.5 |
| Elmore Philpott | 97 | 18.5 |
| Total | 524 | 100.0 |

W.E.N. Sinclair and Sydney Tweed both withdrew from the race before balloting.

== 1943 leadership convention ==
(Held on April 30, 1943 at the King Edward Hotel in Toronto.)

| Candidate | Votes | % |
|---|---|---|
| Harry Nixon | 418 | 74.0 |
| Arthur Roebuck | 85 | 15.0 |
| Thomas McQuesten | 40 | 7.1 |
| Walter Thomson | 22 | 3.9 |
| Total | 573 | 100.0 |

There were 8 spoiled ballots. Premier Gordon Conant had also been a candidate but collapsed the morning of the leadership vote and withdrew.

== 1945 leadership election ==
(Held on April 2, 1945 at the King Edward Hotel in Toronto.)

| Candidate | Votes |
|---|---|
| Mithchell Hepburn | acclaimed |

Harry Nixon resigned as Liberal leader on December 10, 1944 and nominated Hepburn to succeed him as parliamentary leader until a leadership convention could be held. Following the defeat of George Drew's Conservative government in a non-confidence motion, Hepburn was elected Acting Leader on April 2, 1945, at a joint meeting held at the King Edward Hotel of Ontario Liberal MPPs, federal Ontario Liberal MPs the party executive and other party officials in order to lead the party into the election. The move was to be affirmed by a party convention to be held on May 1, but this was cancelled due to the 1945 provincial election being underway. Hepburn was defeated in the 1945 provincial election, and Farquhar Oliver was chosen as the Ontario Liberal Party's parliamentary leader on July 4, 1945.

== 1947 leadership convention ==
(Held on May 16, 1947 at the King Edward Hotel in Toronto)

| Candidate | Votes | % |
|---|---|---|
| Farquhar Oliver | 492 | 74.4 |
| Colin Campbell | n/a | n/a |
| Allan A. Lamport | n/a | n/a |
| Alvin P. Cadeau | n/a | n/a |
| W.A. Gunn | n/a | n/a |
| Total | 661 | 100.0 |

- P.M. Dewan and W.A. Moore both withdrew from the race before balloting.

(Note: Complete vote totals were not reported. Oliver received 492 of 661 votes cast)

== 1950 leadership convention ==
(Held on November 10, 1950 at the Royal York Hotel in Toronto.)

Delegate support by ballot
| Candidate | 1st ballot | | 2nd ballot | | 3rd ballot | |
|---|---|---|---|---|---|---|
| Name | Votes cast | % | Votes cast | % | Votes cast | % |
| Walter Thomson | 296 | 40.1 | 334 | 44.9 | 365 | 52.1 |
| Harry Cassidy | 156 | 21.1 | 194 | 26.1 | 220 | 31.4 |
| John G. Brown | 149 | 20.2 | 166 | 22.3 | 116 | 16.5 |
| Campbell Calder | 69 | 9.3 | 50 | 6.7 | Eliminated | |
| Henry Arnott Hicks | 28 | 3.8 | Withdrew | | | |
| Charles Winnans Cox | 24 | 3.3 | Withdrew | | | |
| Norman Hipel | 12 | 1.6 | Withdrew | | | |
| J. J. Sullivan | 4 | 0.5 | Eliminated | | | |
| Total | 738 | 100.0 | 744 | 100.0 | 701 | 100.0 |

After the first ballot, J. J. Sullivan was eliminated. Henry Arnott Hicks, Charles Winnans Cox, and Norman Hipel withdrew before the second ballot. Campbell Calder was eliminated after the second ballot, leaving Thomson, Cassidy, and Brown on the third and final ballot.

== 1954 leadership convention ==
(Held on April 9, 1954 at the Royal York Hotel in Toronto.)

| Candidate | Votes | % |
|---|---|---|
| Farquhar Oliver | 412 | 66.5 |
| Albert Wren | 162 | 26.1 |
| Bob Temple | 46 | 7.4 |
| Total | 620 | 100.0 |

== 1958 leadership convention ==
(Held on April 20, 1958 at the King Edward Hotel in Toronto.)

Delegate support by ballot
| Candidate | 1st ballot | | 2nd ballot | | 3rd ballot | |
| Candidate | Votes | % | Votes | % | Votes | % |
|---|---|---|---|---|---|---|
| John Wintermeyer | 264 | 34.2 | 369 | 46.8 | 398 | 53.3 |
| Walter Harris | 304 | 39.3 | 354 | 44.9 | 349 | 46.7 |
| Joe Greene | 88 | 11.4 | 45 | 5.7 | 14 | 1.9 |
| Vernon Singer | 43 | 5.6 | 21 | 2.7 | | |
| Ross Whicher | 39 | 5.0 | | | | |
| Arthur Reaume | 32 | 4.1 | | | | |
| Albert Wren | 7 | 0.9 | | | | |
| Total | 777 | 100.0 | 789 | 100.0 | 747 | 100.0 |

Wren eliminated and endorsed Wintermeyer; Whicher and Reaume withdrew and endorsed Wintermeyer.

== 1964 leadership convention ==
(Held on September 19–20, 1964 at the Royal York Hotel in Toronto.)

Delegate support by ballot
| Candidate | 1st ballot | | 2nd ballot | | 3rd ballot | | 4th ballot | | 5th ballot | | 6th ballot | |
| Name | Votes cast | % | Votes cast | % | Votes cast | % | Votes cast | % | Votes cast | % | Votes cast | % |
|---|---|---|---|---|---|---|---|---|---|---|---|---|
| Andy Thompson | 379 | 27.7 | 408 | 29.7 | 462 | 33.6 | 520 | 38.1 | 539 | 39.9 | 772 | 58.8 |
| Charles Templeton | 317 | 23.1 | 356 | 25.9 | 396 | 28.8 | 422 | 30.9 | 419 | 31.0 | 540 | 41.2 |
| Robert Nixon | 313 | 22.8 | 351 | 25.6 | 356 | 25.9 | 387 | 28.3 | 392 | 29.0 | | |
| Joe Greene | 236 | 17.2 | 211 | 15.4 | 149 | 10.9 | 37 | 2.7 | | | | |
| Victor Copps | 61 | 4.5 | 27 | 2.0 | 10 | 0.7 | | | | | | |
| Eddie Sargent | 51 | 3.7 | 20 | 1.5 | | | | | | | | |
| Joseph Gould | 13 | 0.9 | | | | | | | | | | |
| Total | 1,370 | 100.0 | 1,373 | 100.0 | 1,373 | 100.0 | 1,366 | 100.0 | 1,350 | 100.0 | 1,312 | 100.0 |

== 1967 leadership convention ==
(Held on January 6, 1967 at the Royal York Hotel, Toronto)

| Candidate | Votes |
|---|---|
| Robert Nixon | acclaimed |

(Nixon was elected interim leader by the caucus on November 16, 1966 following the resignation of Andrew Thompson. Nixon had suggested that Charles Templeton may become permanent leader but members of his caucus spoke in opposition and Templeton decline to run. Nixon was acclaimed as permanent leader at the party's 1967 convention. He announced his resignation as party leader in 1972, but subsequently entered the race to succeed himself in 1973.)

== 1973 leadership convention ==
(Held on October 28, 1973 at the Royal York Hotel in Toronto.)

Delegate support by ballot
| Candidate | 1st ballot | | 2nd ballot | | 3rd ballot | |
| Name | Votes cast | % | Votes cast | % | Votes cast | % |
|---|---|---|---|---|---|---|
| Robert Nixon | 730 | 42.5 | 768 | 45.3 | 922 | 57.7 |
| Norman Cafik | 574 | 33.4 | 613 | 36.1 | 675 | 42.3 |
| Donald Deacon | 402 | 23.4 | 316 | 18.6 | Endorsed Nixon | |
| Michael Houlton | 11 | 0.6 | No endorsement | | | |
| Total | 1,717 | 100.0 | 1,697 | 100.0 | 1,597 | 100.0 |

== 1976 leadership convention ==
(Held on January 24–25, 1976 at the Four Seasons Sheraton Hotel, Toronto)

Delegate support by ballot
| Candidate | 1st ballot | | 2nd ballot | | 3rd ballot | |
| Name | Votes cast | % | Votes cast | % | Votes cast | % |
|---|---|---|---|---|---|---|
| Stuart Smith | 629 | 32.0 | 742 | 38.5 | 998 | 51.2 |
| David Peterson | 518 | 26.4 | 673 | 34.9 | 953 | 48.8 |
| Albert Roy | 469 | 23.9 | 513 | 26.6 | No Endorsement | |
| Mark MacGuigan | 308 | 15.7 | No Endorsement | | | |
| Larry Condon | 37 | 1.9 | No Endorsement | | | |
| Michael Houlton | 4 | 0.2 | No endorsement | | | |
| Total | 1,965 | 100.0 | 1,928 | 100.0 | 1,951 | 100.0 |

== 1982 leadership convention ==
(Held on February 21, 1982 at the Sheraton Centre Toronto Hotel, Toronto).

= Eliminated from next round
= Withdrew nomination
= Winner

Delegate support by ballot
| Candidate | 1st Ballot | | 2nd Ballot | |
| Name | Votes | % | Votes | % |
|---|---|---|---|---|
| David Peterson | 966 | 46.3 | 1136 | 55.2 |
| Sheila Copps | 636 | 30.5 | 774 | 37.6 |
| Richard Thomas | 234 | 11.2 | 148 | 7.2 |
| Jim Breithaupt | 130 | 6.2 | | |
| John Sweeney | 122 | 5.8 | | |
Votes cast by ballot
| Total | 2088 | 100.0 | 2058 | 100.0 |

== 1992 leadership convention ==
(Held February 8–9, 1992 at the Copps Coliseum in Hamilton.)

= Eliminated from next round
= Winner

| Candidate | 1st Ballot | | 2nd Ballot | | 3rd Ballot | | 4th Ballot | | 5th Ballot (Note: There were 21 spoiled ballots on the final count.) | |
| Name | Votes | % | Votes | % | Votes | % | Votes | % | Votes | % |
|---|---|---|---|---|---|---|---|---|---|---|
| Murray Elston | 740 | 30.2 | 767 | 31.8 | 865 | 35.6 | 988 | 41.6 | 1153 | 49.8 |
| Lyn McLeod | 667 | 27.2 | 744 | 30.9 | 873 | 35.9 | 1049 | 44.1 | 1162 | 50.2 |
| Greg Sorbara | 345 | 14.1 | 380 | 15.8 | 402 | 16.6 | 341 | 14.3 | Released delegates | |
| Charles Beer | 247 | 10.1 | 307 | 12.7 | 289 | 11.9 | Released delegates | | | |
| Steve Mahoney | 236 | 9.6 | 213 | 8.8 | Supported McLeod | | | | | |
| David Ramsay | 216 | 8.8 | Released delegates | | | | | | | |
| Total | 2451 | 100.0 | 2411 | 100.0 | 2429 | 100.0 | 2378 | 100.0 | 2315 | 100.0 |

== 1996 leadership convention ==
(Held November 30 – December 1, 1996 at the Maple Leaf Gardens, Toronto)

= Eliminated from next round
= Withdrew nomination
= Winner

| Candidate | elected delegates | | 1st Ballot (7:31pm) | | 2nd Ballot (10:25pm)^{[A]} | | 3rd Ballot (12:39am) | | 4th Ballot (2:35am) | | 5th Ballot (4:25am) | |
| Name | Votes | % | Votes | % | Votes | % | Votes | % | Votes | % | Votes | % |
|---|---|---|---|---|---|---|---|---|---|---|---|---|
| Dalton McGuinty | 410 | 17.2 | 450 | 17.6 | 440 | 17.6 | 601 | 23.9 | 750 | 31.1 | 1205 | 53.1 |
| Gerard Kennedy | 703 | 29.5 | 770 | 30.1 | 775 | 30.9 | 803 | 31.9 | 968 | 40.1 | 1065 | 46.9 |
| Joseph Cordiano | 497 | 20.8 | 557 | 21.8 | 570 | 22.7 | 601 | 23.9 | 696 | 28.8 | Supported McGuinty | |
| Dwight Duncan | 393 | 16.5 | 464 | 18.1 | 474 | 18.9 | 509 | 20.3 | Supported Kennedy | | | |
| John Gerretsen | 129 | 5.4 | 152 | 6.0 | 124 | 5.0 | Supported McGuinty | | | | | |
| Anna-Marie Castrilli | 110 | 4.6 | 141 | 5.5 | 122 | 4.9 | Supported McGuinty | | | | | |
| Greg Kells | 17 | 0.7 | 24 | 0.9 | Released delegates | | | | | | | |
| Independent | 127 | 5.3 | | | | | | | | | | |
| Total | 2386 | 100.0 | 2558 | 100.0 | 2505 | 100.0 | 2514 | 100.0 | 2414 | 100.0 | 2270 | 100.0 |

^{A} Castrilli initially withdrew from the 2nd ballot but subsequently returned, causing a delay in voting

== 2013 leadership election ==
(Held January 26, 2013 at the Maple Leaf Gardens, Toronto)

A leadership contest was trigger when Premier Dalton McGuinty stepped down after nine years in office. Five current and two former members of his cabinet entered the contest. The contest featured two women on the final ballot, and resulted in the first female Premier in Ontario, and the first openly LGBT premier in Canada.

= Eliminated from next round
= Withdrew nomination
= Winner

Delegate support by ballot
| Candidate | Pledged delegates | | Ballot 1 | | Ballot 2 | | | Ballot 3 | | |
| Name | Votes | % | Votes | % | Votes | % | +/- (pp) | Votes | % | +/- (pp) |
|---|---|---|---|---|---|---|---|---|---|---|
| Sandra Pupatello | 509 | 27.4% | 599 | 28.74% | 817 | 39.4% | +10.7 | 866 | 43.0% | +5.8% |
| Kathleen Wynne | 468 | 25.2% | 597 | 28.65% | 750 | 36.2% | +7.6 | 1,150 | 57.0% | +20.8 |
| Gerard Kennedy | 260 | 14.0% | 281 | 13.5% | 285 | 13.7% | +0.2 | Endorsed Wynne | | |
| Harinder Takhar | 244 | 13.1% | 235 | 11.3% | 18 | 0.9% | -10.4 | Endorsed Pupatello^{[A]} | | |
| Charles Sousa | 204 | 11.0% | 222 | 10.7% | 203 | 9.8% | -0.9 | Endorsed Wynne | | |
| Eric Hoskins | 105 | 5.7% | 150 | 7.2% | Endorsed Wynne | | | | | |
| Independent | 67 | 3.6% | | | | | | | | |
| Glen Murray | Endorsed Wynne | | | | | | | | | |
Votes cast and net change by ballot
| Total | 1,857 | | 2,084 | | 2,073 | | -11 | 2,016 | | -57 |

^{A} Takhar endorsed Pupatello before the second ballot voting took place, but after the deadline to drop off the ballot.

== 2020 leadership election ==
(Held March 6–7, 2020 at the International Centre, Mississauga)

| Candidate | Delegate Elected | | First (final) ballot | |
|---|---|---|---|---|
| Steven Del Duca | 1,172 | 56.2% | 1,258 | 58.8% |
| Michael Coteau | 370 | 17.8% | 363 | 16.9% |
| Kate Graham | 273 | 13.1% | 299 | 13.9% |
| Mitzie Hunter | 130 | 6.2% | 122 | 5.7% |
| Alvin Tedjo | 72 | 3.4% | 74 | 3.5% |
| Brenda Hollingsworth | 25 | 1.2% | 24 | 1.1% |
| Independent | 42 | 2.0% | | |
| Total | 2084 | | 2140 | |

There was one spoiled ballot.

== 2023 leadership election ==
(Results announced December 2, 2023 at the Metro Toronto Convention Centre)

A leadership election was held December 2, 2023 due to the June 2, 2022 resignation of Steven Del Duca as party leader following his party's poor result in the 2022 Ontario general election.

= Eliminated from next round
= Winner

Results by round
| Candidate | 1st round | | 2nd round | | | | 3rd round | | | |
| Candidate | Points | Votes | Points | +/- | Votes | +/- | Points | +/- | Votes | +/- |
|---|---|---|---|---|---|---|---|---|---|---|
| Bonnie Crombie | 5,559; 42.96% | 9,314; 41.07% | 6,047; 46.73% | 488; 3.77% | 10,176; 45.40% | 862; 4.33% | 6,911; 53.40% | 864; 6.67% | 11,325; 52.35% | 1,149; 6.95% |
| Nathaniel Erskine-Smith | 3,320; 25.66% | 6,083; 26.82% | 3,792; 29.30% | 472; 3.64% | 6,944; 30.99% | 861; 4.17% | 6,029; 46.59% | 2,237; 17.29% | 10,307; 47.65% | 3,363; 16.66% |
| Yasir Naqvi | 2,760; 21.33% | 4,705; 20.75% | 3,101; 23.96% | 341; 2.63% | 5,294; 23.62% | 589; 2.87% | Eliminated | | | |
| Ted Hsu | 1,300; 10.05% | 2,578; 11.36% | Eliminated | | | | | | | |
| Total | 12,940 | 22,680 | 12,940 | 0 | 22,414 | -266 | 12,940 | 0 | 21,632 | -782 |

First round
| Crombie | 42.96% |
| Erskine-Smith | 25.66% |
| Naqvi | 23.96% |
| Hsu | 10.05% |

Final round
| Crombie | 53.40% |
| Erskine-Smith | 46.59% |

According to the party, 22,827 party members cast ballots out of a total membership of over 100,000.

== 2026 leadership election ==
(Results announced November 21, 2026 at the Metro Toronto Convention Centre)

Held due to the resignation of Bonnie Crombie as party leader, following her poor result in a leadership review vote.

= Eliminated from next round
= Winner

Results by round
| Candidate | 1st round | | 2nd round | | | | 3rd round | | | |
| Candidate | Points | Votes | Points | +/− | Votes | +/− | Points | +/− | Votes | +/− |
|---|---|---|---|---|---|---|---|---|---|---|
| Navdeep Bains | 5,848.21 44.12% | 9148 44.85% | 6,107.70 46.08% | +259.49 +1.96 pp | 9346 46.53% | +198 +1.68 pp | 6,666.32 50.29% | +558.62 +4.21 pp | 9961 50.74% | +615 +4.21 pp |
| Lee Fairclough | 4,470.05 33.72% | 6995 34.29% | 5,060.56 38.18% | +590.51 +4.45 pp | 7722 38.44% | +727 +4.15 pp | 6,588.68 49.71% | +1,528.12 +11.53 pp | 9669 49.26% | +1947 +10.81 pp |
| Stephanie Bowman | 1,703.37 12.85% | 2580 12.65% | 2,086.79 15.74% | +383.42 +2.89 pp | 3018 15.03% | +438 +2.38 pp | Eliminated | | | |
| Dylan Marando | 1,233.37 9.30% | 1674 8.21% | Eliminated | | | | | | | |
| Total | 13,255.00 | 20,397 | 13,255.05 | +0.05 | 20,086 | -311 | 13,255.00 | −0.05 | 19,630 | -456 |

First round
| Bains | 44.12% |
| Fairclough | 33.72% |
| Bowman | 12.85% |
| Marando | 9.30% |

Final round
| Bains | 50.29% |
| Fairclough | 49.71% |
