= 1922 Ontario Liberal Party leadership election =

1922 leadership election of the Ontario Liberal Party

- Date: 3 March 1922
- Convention: Foresters' Hall, Toronto, Ontario
- Resigning leader: Hartley Dewart
- Won by: Wellington Hay
- Ballots: 1
- Candidates: 3

The 1922 Ontario Liberal Party leadership election was held on 3 March 1922 at Foresters' Hall in Toronto to choose a new leader of the Ontario Liberal Party. Wellington Hay, the MPP for Perth North, was elected leader on the first ballot.

Hay defeated two other candidates, J. C. Tolmie and W. E. N. Sinclair. Contemporary reports stated that Hay won by a clear majority, but the vote totals were not announced.

== Background ==
The convention followed a period of difficulty for the Ontario Liberals. The party had been defeated in the 1919 Ontario general election, which brought the United Farmers of Ontario to power under E. C. Drury. The Liberals, previously the main opposition to the Conservatives, were reduced to third place in the legislature.

Hartley Dewart had been elected Liberal leader at the 1919 Ontario Liberal Party leadership election, but the party remained divided over policy and strategy, including its relationship to the agrarian and labour movements that had helped bring the United Farmers government to office. The 1922 convention was called to choose a leader before the next provincial election.

== Candidates ==
- Wellington Hay – Hay was the Liberal MPP for Perth North, first elected in a 1916 by-election and re-elected in 1919. A grain merchant from Listowel, he had also served as mayor of that town. He was elected leader on the first ballot and subsequently led the party in the 1923 Ontario general election.
- J. C. Tolmie – Tolmie was the Liberal MPP for Windsor and a Presbyterian minister. He had served as a chaplain during the First World War and had previously contested the 1919 Liberal leadership convention, finishing second to Hartley Dewart on the final ballot. He again sought the leadership in 1922 but was defeated by Hay.
- W. E. N. Sinclair – Sinclair was the Liberal MPP for Ontario South and a lawyer from Oshawa. He had been elected to the legislature in 1911, returned in 1919, and later served as interim leader of the Ontario Liberal Party after Hay's resignation. Sinclair remained a prominent figure in the Liberal caucus through the 1920s and early 1930s.

== Ballot results ==
- Wellington Hay won with clear majority on the first ballot
- J.C. Tolmie
- W.E.N. Sinclair

== Aftermath ==
Hay led the Ontario Liberals into the 1923 Ontario general election. The party's representation fell sharply, and Hay resigned the leadership after the election. Sinclair then served as interim leader of the party and as Leader of the Opposition in the legislature.

The Liberals did not hold another leadership convention until 1930, when Mitchell Hepburn was chosen as leader. Hepburn later led the party to victory in the 1934 Ontario general election.
