= St. Andrew's Presbyterian Church (Windsor, Ontario) =

RCCG Throne of Grace Windsor
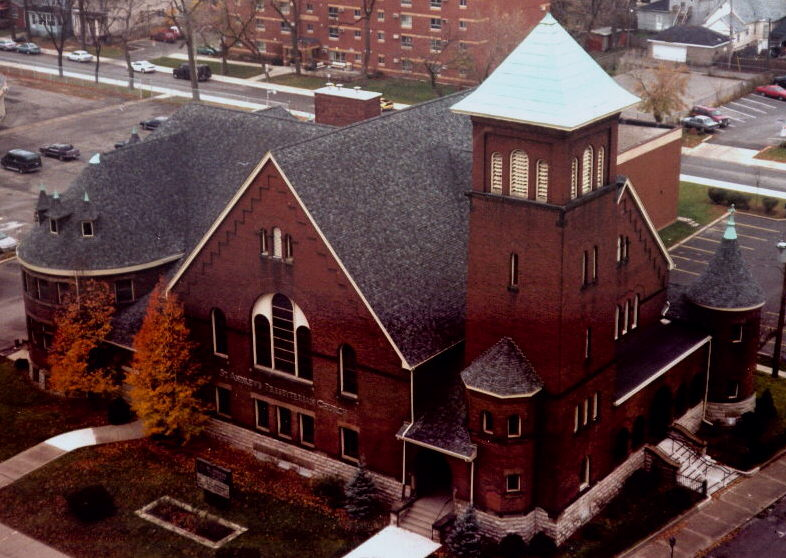
- RCCG Throne of Grace, Windsor Former: St. Andrew's Presbyterian Church, Windsor

- Location in Ontario
- 42°18′56″N 83°02′26″W
- Location: Windsor, Ontario, Canada
- Denomination: Redeemed Christian Church of God
- Website: https://www.rccgwindsor.com

History
- Founded: 1857

Architecture
- Architect(s): Spier & Rohns

St. Andrew's Presbyterian Church, is a Presbyterian Church in Canada congregation in downtown Windsor, Ontario, Canada. The congregation dates back to 1857, and at one time, was the largest congregation by membership within the Presbyterian Church in Canada (PCC).

== History ==
The first congregation of St. Andrew's Presbyterian Church began in 1857. Twenty-nine Presbyterians petitioned the London UPC Presbytery for their own congregation from the United Presbyterian Church of Scotland congregation in Detroit. Permission was granted on July 1, and St. Andrew's elected its first Session on July 12, and met in early August with a charter membership of 32. Alexander Bartlet served as Session Clerk from then until his death in 1910, and Sunday school Superintendent until 1893. St Andrew's was at that time part of the UPC's Presbytery of London, in Canada West.

In the early years, there was no church building. Services were held in a room above the store of John McCrae, the same room that was used as the council chambers by the municipal government until Windsor constructed its first town hall. There were also meetings at the Old Ward School. With such a small congregation it was difficult to secure a permanent minister. The usual practice was to bring in someone from Detroit or a missionary to conduct services. Ministers from around the UPC's London Presbytery were appointed to moderate Session Meetings.

The UPC and the Free Church, Canada Synod merged in July 1861 to become the Canada Presbyterian Church. Rev. William Bennet, a native of Ireland who was ministering in New Brunswick was called to the post, and was the first minister inducted in Windsor, serving from October 22, 1861, to November 1863. The first building for St. Andrew's was erected in 1865 on the southeast corner of Victoria Avenue and Chatham Street. In May 1866, the Rev. Alexander Ferrier Kemp was called from St Gabriel's Church in Montreal as its second minister. He left in 1870 when appointed to a professorship at Olivet College in Olivet, Michigan. Dr. Kemp later returned to Canada as principal of the Ottawa Ladies' College, and was co author of the 1883 Handbook of the Presbyterian Church in Canada.

Kemp was followed by the Rev. John Gray, an 1870 graduate of Toronto's Knox College (all subsequent senior ministers are Knox Alumni), during whose pastorate (1870-1893) the congregation built a new brick church at Victoria and Park Street, in 1883. On March 16, 1895, the building burned to the ground. Gray, like his predecessor, left for the United States (Kalamazoo, Michigan), and later retired in Toronto.

== The present church ==
The fire precipitated the building of the current structure in 1895, with the first service held on June 14, 1896. The church was originally designed to seat 800. The balconies were added in 1903, allowing the seating of another 400 people. In 1915, Rev. James C. Tolmie (1893-1915) resigned from St Andrew's, having combined the pulpit when elected Member of Provincial Parliament for Windsor in 1914. He went overseas with the Essex Fusiliers, and was the finalist in the provincial Liberal Party Leadership Convention in both 1919 and 1922. He was designated "Minister Emeritus" at St. Andrew's.

Rev. Dr. Hugh M. Paulin arrived in late 1915 and served the congregation over thirty-five years until his death in October 1952. The congregation voted in 1925 to remain within the continuing Presbyterian Church in Canada by a vote of 18 for joining into the United Church of Canada, and 607 against the proposed merger. The membership at St Andrew's exceeded 2,000 members the year Dr. Paulin died, and retained the largest membership in the PCC in the years following 1925, until surpassed by St Andrew's Church in Kitchener.

The Rev. Dr. William Lawson succeeded Paulin, serving from 1953 until his retirement in 1981, followed by Dr. Robert Fourney (1982-1996). The Rev. Dr. Jeff Loach, now minister of St Paul's in Nobleton, Ontario, ministered from 1997 until 2004.

An addition to the building was completed in 1983, consisting primarily of the Meeting Place and the Herman-Clark Hall, along with significant renovations to the offices and Sunday School rooms in the southern part of the building.

In June 1980, the congregation hosted the General Assembly of the Presbyterian Church in Canada; the opening service was held in St Andrew's, with the remainder of the event held at the University of Windsor. The Assembly coincided with the United Presbyterian Church in the United States of America's General Assembly held in Detroit, and there was a joint session held at Cobo Hall. In June 1997, the PCC General Assembly returned to Windsor.

The congregation celebrated its 150th anniversary in 2007. The celebrations started with the induction of only their ninth Senior Minister, Rev. Ronald Sharpe, who arrived from a ministry in Cape Breton, Nova Scotia.

The building also hosts a Chinese-speaking congregation, the Windsor Chinese Presbyterian Church, that holds weekly worship on Sunday afternoons.

On May 1, 2016, the congregation voted to end current operations, sell their building and property, and investigate other ministry opportunities in the downtown core due to financial concerns.

The Church property was thereafter purchased by The Redeemed Christian Church of God, and till date continue to worship and congregate at the historical location, opening doors to all and sundry, while continuing to run Soup kitchens and a food bank for those in need.
