= James Tolmie =

James Tolmie may refer to:

- James Tolmie (Canadian politician) (1855–1917), politician in British Columbia, Canada
- James Tolmie (Australian politician) (1862–1939), Australian newspaper owner and politician
- J. C. Tolmie (James Craig Tolmie, 1862–1938), Canadian politician, Presbyterian clergyman and military chaplain
