= James Redford =

James Redford may refer to:

- James Redford (politician)
- James Redford (filmmaker)
