= John C. Monteith =

Canadian politician

Ontario MPP
- In office May 29, 1902 – November 6, 1902
- Preceded by: John Brown
- Succeeded by: John Brown
- Constituency: Perth North

Personal details
- Born: 1853; Stratford, Canada West
- Died: 1940 (aged 86–87); Stratford, Ontario
- Political party: Conservative

John C. Monteith (1853 – November 1940) was a politician from the Canadian province of Ontario. He was mayor of Stratford in 1893 and 1894.

He was born in Stratford, Canada West, the son of Andrew Monteith. Monteith served as reeve, city councillor and mayor for Stratford. He was elected to represent Perth North in the Legislative Assembly of Ontario in 1902 but his election was overturned later that year after an appeal.
