= 1919 Ontario Liberal Party leadership election =

1919 leadership election of the Ontario Liberal Party

- Date: 26 June 1919
- Convention: Foresters' Hall, Toronto, Ontario
- Resigning leader: William Proudfoot (interim)
- Won by: Hartley Dewart
- Ballots: 2
- Candidates: 5

The 1919 Ontario Liberal Party leadership election was held on 26 June 1919 at Foresters' Hall in Toronto to choose a new leader of the Ontario Liberal Party. Hartley Dewart, the MPP for Toronto Southwest, was elected leader on the second ballot.

Dewart defeated J. C. Tolmie, J. C. Elliott, William Proudfoot, and Thomas McMillan. Several other Liberals were nominated or discussed as possible candidates, but declined to stand. The convention was the first Ontario Liberal leadership contest decided by a delegated party convention rather than by the party's legislative caucus.

== Background ==
The Ontario Liberals had been out of office since the defeat of the government of George William Ross in the 1905 Ontario general election. The party subsequently went through several leaders, including Alexander Grant MacKay, Newton Rowell, and William Proudfoot. Rowell resigned after joining the federal Unionist government during the First World War, and Proudfoot served as interim leader.

The 1919 convention was held before the 1919 Ontario general election, at a time when the party was divided over issues including prohibition, labour policy, agrarian politics, and the aftermath of the wartime Union government. The convention adopted a more formal leadership-selection process, with delegates choosing among candidates rather than leaving the decision solely to the Liberal members of the legislature.

== Candidates ==
- Hartley Dewart – Dewart was a Toronto lawyer and Liberal MPP for Toronto Southwest – Seat A. He had first been elected to the legislature in a 1916 by-election and was known as a prominent urban Liberal and critic of prohibition. He won the leadership on the second ballot.
- J. C. Tolmie – Tolmie was the Liberal MPP for Windsor, a Presbyterian minister, and a military chaplain during the First World War. He placed second on both ballots and later contested the 1922 Ontario Liberal Party leadership election.
- J. C. Elliott – Elliott was the Liberal MPP for Middlesex West. He placed third on both ballots and remained in the contest after Proudfoot and McMillan were dropped from the second ballot. Elliott later entered federal politics and served in the Canadian House of Commons.
- William Proudfoot – Proudfoot was the interim leader of the Ontario Liberal Party and the MPP for Huron Centre. He had served in the legislature since 1908 and was later appointed to the Senate of Canada. Proudfoot placed fourth on the first ballot and did not continue to the second ballot.
- Thomas McMillan – McMillan was a farmer and Liberal candidate from Huron County. He had run federally as a Laurier Liberal in the 1917 Canadian federal election and later served as the federal Liberal member of Parliament for Huron South. He placed fifth on the first ballot.

=== Declined candidates ===
Several other names were placed in nomination or discussed before the convention but did not stand. These included Charles Martin Bowman, W. T. R. Preston, Rev. W. G. Charlton, A. J. Young, and federal MP Frederick Forsyth Pardee.

== Ballot results ==
= Eliminated from next round
= Withdrew nomination
= Winner

Delegate support by ballot
Candidate	Ballot 1		Ballot 2		
Name	Votes	%	Votes	%	+/- (pp)
Hartley Dewart	147	47.1%	158	52.1%	+5.0
J. C. Tolmie	97	31.1%	121	39.9%	+8.8
J. C. Elliott	37	11.9%	24	7.9%	-4.0
William Proudfoot	23	7.4%	Eliminated		
Thomas McMillan	8	2.6%	Eliminated		
Votes cast and net change by ballot
Total	312	100.0%	303	100.0%	-9

== Aftermath ==
Dewart led the Ontario Liberals into the 1919 Ontario general election, held later that year. The election produced a major realignment in provincial politics: the United Farmers of Ontario formed government with Labour support, the Conservatives were defeated, and the Liberals remained out of office.

Dewart continued as Liberal leader until 1921. He was succeeded at the 1922 Ontario Liberal Party leadership election by Wellington Hay, who led the party into the 1923 Ontario general election.
