= Andrew Monteith =

Canadian politician

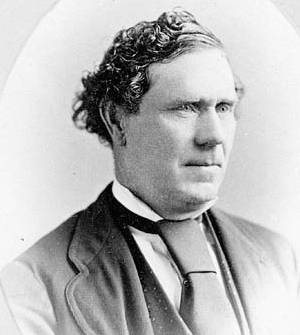

Member of Parliament for Perth North
- In office 1874–1878
- Preceded by: Thomas Mayne Daly
- Succeeded by: Samuel Rollin Hesson

Ontario MPP
- In office 1867–1874
- Preceded by: Riding established
- Succeeded by: Thomas Mayne Daly
- Constituency: Perth North

Personal details
- Born: August 15, 1823 County Tyrone, Ireland
- Died: February 1, 1896 (aged 72) Downie Township, Ontario
- Party: Conservative
- Spouse: Jane Dunsmore (m. 1850)
- Occupation: Merchant

Andrew Monteith (August 15, 1823 – February 1, 1896) was a Canadian businessman and political figure in Ontario. He represented Perth North in the Parliament of Ontario from 1867 to 1874 and in the House of Commons of Canada as a Conservative member for Perth North from 1874 to 1878.

He was born in County Tyrone, Ireland in 1823, the son of John Monteith, and came to Downie Township in Perth County, Upper Canada with his family in 1834. For a time, he worked with his brother who owned a store in Stratford. He served on the county council from 1850 to 1865 and on the town council for Stratford from 1857 to 1861. Monteith married Jane Dunsmore in 1850. He was elected to the 1st Parliament of Ontario in 1867; in 1874, he was elected to the House of Commons. He resigned from politics in 1878. He died at his home in Downie Township in 1896 after suffering a stroke.

His sons, John and Joseph, served as mayors of Stratford and were elected to the Ontario legislature. John's election was declared invalid on appeal.

Monteith Township in Parry Sound District, Ontario, was named after Andrew Monteith.

== Electoral history ==
=== Federal ===
1874 Canadian federal election: Perth North
| Party | Candidate | Votes |
|---|---|---|
| Conservative | Andrew Monteith | 1,992 |
| Liberal | James Redford | 1,829 |
Source: lop.parl.ca

By-election: On Mr. Monteith being unseated on petition, 7 July 1875: Perth North
| Party | Candidate | Votes |
|---|---|---|
| Conservative | Andrew Monteith | 1,737 |
| Independent | James Fisher | 1,717 |

=== Provincial ===
1867 Ontario general election: Perth North
| Party | Candidate | Votes | % |
|---|---|---|---|
| Conservative | Andrew Monteith | 1,568 | 57.58 |
| Liberal | David Davidson Hay | 1,155 | 42.42 |
| Total valid votes | | 2,723 | 72.81 |
| Eligible voters | | 3,740 | |
| Conservative pickup new district. | | | |
Source: Elections Ontario

1871 Ontario general election: Perth North
| Party | Candidate | Votes | % | ±% |
|---|---|---|---|---|
| Conservative | Andrew Monteith | 1,630 | 57.88 | +0.30 |
| Liberal | Thomas Ballantyne | 1,186 | 42.12 | −0.30 |
| Turnout | | 2,816 | 68.20 | −4.61 |
| Eligible voters | | 4,129 | | |
| Conservative hold | | Swing | | +0.30 |
Source: Elections Ontario
