= David McKenzie Wright =

Canadian politician (1874–1937)

Member of Parliament for Perth North
- In office October 1925 – September 1926
- Preceded by: James Palmer Rankin
- Succeeded by: Francis Wellington Hay

Member of Parliament for Perth North
- In office July 1930 – August 1935
- Preceded by: Francis Wellington Hay
- Succeeded by: riding dissolved

Personal details
- Born: David McKenzie Wright; 11 February 1874 Ayton, Ontario, Canada
- Died: 24 August 1937 (aged 63)
- Party: Conservative
- Spouse(s): Annie MacLennan m. 6 October 1909
- Profession: industrialist

David McKenzie Wright (11 February 1874 – 24 August 1937) was a Conservative member of the House of Commons of Canada. He was born in Ayton, Ontario and became an industrialist.

Wright attended public and secondary schools at Mount Forest, then Central Business College in Stratford, Ontario. He was also a city councillor for Stratford at one time.

He operated the McLagan Furniture company and was president of Meaford Manufacturing. In 1929 and 1930, Wright served as Rotary International's Canadian director and during those same years also served on Ontario's provincial Royal Commission of Public Welfare. He was also a representative on the Niagara Falls Park Commission.

Wright was first elected to Parliament at the Perth North riding in the 1925 general election then defeated in the 1926 election. He won back the riding in 1930 and served the full term of the 17th Canadian Parliament before leaving federal politics.
