= Hugh Boulton Morphy =

Canadian politician

Member of the Canadian Parliament for Perth North
- In office 1911–1921
- Preceded by: James Palmer Rankin
- Succeeded by: James Palmer Rankin

Personal details
- Born: March 12, 1860 St. Mary's, Canada West
- Died: September 23, 1932 (aged 72) Listowel, Ontario, Canada
- Party: Conservative

Hugh Boulton Morphy (March 12, 1860 – September 23, 1932) was a lawyer and political figure in Ontario, Canada. He represented Perth North in the House of Commons of Canada from 1911 to 1921 as a Conservative.

He was born in St. Mary's, Canada West, the son of Edmund Morphy and Susan Nowlan, and was educated there and at Osgoode Hall. Morphy practised law in Listowel. In 1890, he married Magdalene Hess. He defeated James Palmer Rankin in the federal elections of 1911 and 1917, running as a Unionist Party member in 1917. He was defeated by Rankin when he ran for reelection to the House of Commons in 1921.

Morphy also served on the municipal council for Listowel and on the local school board. He was considered one of the best all round cricketers in Canada of his time. Morphy died in Listowel at the age of 72.
