= Thomas Mayne Daly Sr. =

Canadian politician

Thomas Mayne Daly
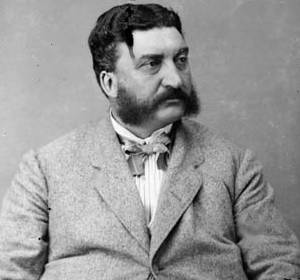

Ontario MPP
- In office 1 February 1874 – 23 December 1874
- Preceded by: Andrew Monteith
- Succeeded by: David Davidson Hay
- Constituency: Perth North

Member of Parliament for Perth North
- In office 1872–1874
- Preceded by: James Redford
- Succeeded by: Andrew Monteith

Legislative Assembly of the Province of Canada
- In office 1862–1863
- Preceded by: Michael Hamilton Foley
- Succeeded by: Robert MacFarlane
- In office 1854–1861
- Preceded by: New riding
- Succeeded by: Michael Hamilton Foley
- Constituency: Perth County, Province of Canada

Personal details
- Born: 17 February 1827 Hamilton, Upper Canada
- Died: 4 March 1885 (aged 58) Stratford, Ontario, Canada
- Party: Conservative
- Profession: Businessman

Thomas Mayne Daly (17 February 1827 – 4 March 1885) was a businessman and political figure in Canada West (later Ontario). He represented the riding of Perth North in the House of Commons of Canada and Perth North in the Ontario Provincial Parliament.

He was born in Hamilton, Upper Canada in 1827 and studied at Upper Canada College. He ran a stage coach company, operated a grain mill and published the Stratford Examiner. He was a contractor, building roads in Perth County and also railroads in Canada and the United States. From 1848 to 1849, he served on the Huron District council and, in 1850, on the council for the united counties of Huron, Perth and Bruce.

In 1854, he was elected to the 5th Parliament of the Province of Canada representing Perth County; he originally described himself as an independent Reformer, but tended to support the Liberal-Conservative party once elected. He was reelected in 1857 but was defeated by Michael Hamilton Foley in 1861. Foley was appointed to the cabinet and ran in Waterloo North; Daly defeated Robert MacFarlane in an 1862 by-election to regain the seat for Perth. However, in 1863, McFarlane won the seat.

Daly was mayor of Stratford from 1869 to 1870 and again from 1876 to 1878. In 1872, he was elected to the House of Commons for Perth North. He was elected for Perth North provincially in an 1874 by-election, but was not reelected in 1875. In 1884, he was appointed deputy collector of customs at Stratford, thanks to his connections with the Conservative Party. He died in Stratford in 1885.

His son, Thomas Mayne Daly, was a member of parliament and cabinet minister from Manitoba.

== Electoral history ==
=== Federal ===
1867 Canadian federal election: Perth North
Party	Candidate	Votes
Liberal	James Redford	1,515
Liberal-Conservative	Thomas Mayne Daly Sr.	1,307
Unknown	Grey	0
Source: Canadian Elections Database

1872 Canadian federal election: Perth North
Party	Candidate	Votes
Liberal-Conservative	Thomas Mayne Daly Sr.	1,848
Liberal	James Redford	1,792
Source: Canadian Elections Database

=== Provincial ===
Ontario provincial by-election, February 1874: Perth North Resignation of Andrew Monteith
Party	Candidate	Votes	%	±%
Conservative	Thomas Mayne Daly Sr.	1,864	54.25	−3.63
Independent	J. Corcoran	1,572	45.75	
Total valid votes		3,436	100.0	+22.02
Conservative hold		Swing		−3.63
Source: History of the Electoral Districts, Legislatures and Ministries of the Province of Ontario
