= Perth North (provincial electoral district) =

Ontario electoral district

Defunct provincial electoral district
- Legislature: Legislative Assembly of Ontario
- District created: 1867
- District abolished: 1933
- First contested: 1867
- Last contested: 1929

Perth North was an electoral riding in Ontario, Canada. It was created in 1867 at the time of confederation and was abolished in 1933 before the 1934 election.

== Members of Provincial Parliament ==
Perth North
Assembly	Years	Member	Party
1st	1867–1871	Andrew Monteith	Conservative
2nd	1871–1874	Andrew Monteith	Conservative
2nd	1874–1874	Thomas Mayne Daly, Sr.	Conservative
3rd	1875–1879	David Davidson Hay	Liberal
4th	1879–1883	David Davidson Hay	Liberal
5th	1883–1886	John George Hess	Conservative
6th	1886–1890	John George Hess	Conservative
7th	1890–1891	Alfred Emanuel Ahrens	Liberal
7th	1892–1894	Thomas Magwood	Conservative
8th	1894–1898	Thomas Magwood	Conservative
9th	1898–1902	John Brown	Liberal
10th	1902–1902	John C. Monteith	Conservative
10th	1902–1904	John Brown	Liberal
11th	1905–1908	James Torrance	Conservative
12th	1908–1911	James Torrance	Conservative
13th	1911–1914	James Torrance	Conservative
14th	1914–1916	James Torrance	Conservative
14th	1916–1919	Francis Wellington Hay	Liberal
15th	1919–1923	Francis Wellington Hay	Liberal
16th	1923–1926	Joseph Dunsmore Monteith	Conservative
17th	1926–1929	Joseph Dunsmore Monteith	Conservative
18th	1929–1934	Joseph Dunsmore Monteith	Conservative
Sourced from the Ontario Legislative Assembly
Merged into Perth before 1934 election

== Election results ==
1929 Ontario general election
Party	Candidate	Votes	%	±%
Conservative	Joseph Monteith	7,273	53.04	–2.93
Liberal	George Irvin Graff	6,439	46.96	+2.93
Total valid votes		13,712	99.57	
Total rejected ballots		59	0.43	+0.03
Turnout		13,771	66.36	+5.12
Eligible voters		20,753		
Conservative hold		Swing		–2.93
Source: Elections Ontario

1926 Ontario general election
Party	Candidate	Votes	%	±%
Conservative	Joseph Monteith	7,350	55.97	+4.29
Liberal	Frederick J. Foster	5,782	44.03	–4.29
Total valid votes		13,132	99.61	
Total rejected ballots		52	0.39	–1.92
Turnout		13,184	61.23	+0.66
Eligible voters		21,531		
Conservative hold		Swing		+4.29
Source: Elections Ontario

1923 Ontario general election
Party	Candidate	Votes	%	±%
Conservative	Joseph Monteith	6,289	51.68	+23.74
Liberal	Wellington Hay	5,879	48.32	+6.69
Total valid votes		12,168	97.69	
Total rejected ballots		288	2.31	+0.30
Turnout		12,456	60.57	–17.82
Eligible voters		20,563		
Conservative gain from Liberal		Swing		–
Source: Elections Ontario

1919 Ontario general election
Party	Candidate	Votes	%	±%
Liberal	Wellington Hay	6,095	41.63	–12.86
United Farmers	William Andrew Amos	4,454	30.42	–
Conservative	James A. Mason	4,092	27.95	–17.56
Total valid votes		14,641	97.99	
Total rejected ballots		301	2.01	+1.54
Turnout		14,942	78.39	+12.04
Eligible voters		19,060		
Liberal hold		Swing		–6.43
Source: Elections Ontario

Ontario provincial by-election, July 10, 1916 Resignation of James Torrance upon appointment as Registrar
Party	Candidate	Votes	%	±%
Liberal	Wellington Hay	3,330	54.49	+15.36
Conservative	John A. Makins	2,781	45.51	–9.68
Total valid votes		6,111	99.53	
Total rejected ballots		29	0.47	–0.41
Turnout		6,140	66.35	–16.28
Eligible voters		9,254		
Liberal gain from Conservative		Swing		+12.52
Source: Elections Ontario

1914 Ontario general election
Party	Candidate	Votes	%	±%
Conservative	James Torrance	3,840	55.19	+2.40
Liberal	Robert S. Robertson	2,723	39.13	–8.08
Socialist	William J. Kennedy	395	5.68	–
Total valid votes		6,958	99.12	
Total rejected ballots		62	0.88	+0.52
Turnout		7,020	82.63	+5.50
Eligible voters		8,496		
Conservative hold		Swing		+5.24
Source: Elections Ontario

1911 Ontario general election
Party	Candidate	Votes	%	±%
Conservative	James Torrance	3,523	52.79	+0.92
Liberal	John Brown	3,151	47.21	–0.92
Total valid votes		6,674	99.64	
Total rejected ballots		24	0.36	–0.16
Turnout		6,698	77.13	–11.52
Eligible voters		8,684		
Conservative hold		Swing		+0.92
Source: Elections Ontario

1908 Ontario general election
Party	Candidate	Votes	%	±%
Conservative	James Torrance	3,688	51.87	–0.34
Liberal	Wellington Hay	3,422	48.13	+0.34
Total valid votes		7,110	99.48	
Total rejected ballots		37	0.52	+0.18
Turnout		7,147	88.65	+0.47
Eligible voters		8,062		
Conservative hold		Swing		–0.34
Source: Elections Ontario

1905 Ontario general election
Party	Candidate	Votes	%	±%
Conservative	James Torrance	3,712	52.21	+3.67
Liberal	John Brown	3,398	47.79	–3.67
Total valid votes		7,110	99.66	
Total rejected ballots		24	0.34	+0.34
Turnout		7,134	88.18	–
Eligible voters		8,090		
Conservative gain from Liberal		Swing		+3.67
Source: Elections Ontario

Ontario provincial by-election, January 7, 1903 Void election
Party	Candidate	Votes	%	±%
Liberal	John Brown	3,627	51.46	+1.48
Conservative	John C. Monteith	3,421	48.54	–1.48
Total valid votes		7,048	100.00	
Total rejected ballots		–		
Turnout		7,048	–	–
Eligible voters				
Liberal gain from Conservative		Swing		+1.48
Source: Elections Ontario

1902 Ontario general election
Party	Candidate	Votes	%	±%
Conservative	John C. Monteith	3,292	50.02	+1.22
Liberal	John Brown	3,290	49.98	–1.22
Total valid votes		6,582	99.92	
Total rejected ballots		5	0.08	–0.36
Turnout		6,587	83.90	–3.13
Eligible voters		7,851		
Conservative gain from Liberal		Swing		+1.22
Source: Elections Ontario

1898 Ontario general election
Party	Candidate	Votes	%	±%
Liberal	John Brown	3,396	51.21	+2.14
Conservative	Thomas Magwood	3,236	48.79	–2.14
Total valid votes		6,632	99.56	
Total rejected ballots		29	0.44	–0.57
Turnout		6,661	87.03	+5.79
Eligible voters		7,654		
Liberal gain from Conservative		Swing		+2.14
Source: Elections Ontario

1894 Ontario general election
Party	Candidate	Votes	%	±%
Conservative	Thomas Magwood	2,957	50.93	+0.52
Liberal	G. G. McPherson	2,849	49.07	–0.52
Total valid votes		5,806	98.99	
Total rejected ballots		59	1.01	+1.01
Turnout		5,865	81.23	–
Eligible voters		7,220		
Conservative hold		Swing		+0.52
Source: Elections Ontario

Ontario provincial by-election, January 23, 1891 Void election
Party	Candidate	Votes	%	±%
Conservative	Thomas Magwood	2,828	50.41	+1.27
Liberal	Alfred Emanuel Ahrens	2,782	49.59	–1.27
Total valid votes		5,610	100.00	
Total rejected ballots		–		
Turnout		5,610	–	–
Eligible voters				
Conservative gain from Liberal		Swing		+1.27
Source: Elections Ontario

1890 Ontario general election
Party	Candidate	Votes	%	±%
Liberal	Alfred Emanuel Ahrens	2,729	50.86	+1.29
Conservative	John George Hess	2,637	49.14	–1.29
Total valid votes		5,366	99.04	
Total rejected ballots		52	0.96	–0.42
Turnout		5,418	72.44	+2.48
Eligible voters		7,479		
Liberal gain from Conservative		Swing		+1.29
Source: Elections Ontario

1886 Ontario general election
Party	Candidate	Votes	%	±%
Conservative	John George Hess	2,445	50.43	–33.02
Liberal	J. H. Schmidt	2,403	49.57	+33.02
Total valid votes		4,848	98.62	
Total rejected ballots		68	1.38	+0.20
Turnout		4,916	69.96	+25.15
Eligible voters		7,027		
Conservative hold		Swing		–33.02
Source: Elections Ontario

1883 Ontario general election
Party	Candidate	Votes	%	±%
Conservative	John George Hess	2,642	83.45	+33.63
Liberal	David Davidson Hay	524	16.55	–33.63
Total valid votes		3,166	98.81	
Total rejected ballots		38	1.19	+1.19
Turnout		3,204	44.81	–22.63
Eligible voters		7,150		
Conservative gain from Liberal		Swing		+33.63
Source: Elections Ontario

1879 Ontario general election
Party	Candidate	Votes	%	±%
Liberal	David Davidson Hay	2,396	50.18	−1.52
Conservative	Mr. McDermott	2,379	49.82	+1.52
Total valid votes		4,775	67.44	−0.72
Eligible voters		7,080		
Liberal hold		Swing		−1.52
Source: Elections Ontario

1875 Ontario general election
Party	Candidate	Votes	%	±%
Liberal	David Davidson Hay	1,847	51.69	
Conservative	Thomas Mayne Daly Sr.	1,707	47.77	−6.47
Conservative	David Campbell	9	0.25	
Conservative	R. Keyes	9	0.25	
Conservative	G. Towner	1	0.03	
Total valid votes		3,573	68.16	
Eligible voters		5,242		
Liberal gain from Conservative		Swing		+3.24
Source: Elections Ontario

Ontario provincial by-election, February 1874 Resignation of Andrew Monteith
Party	Candidate	Votes	%	±%
Conservative	Thomas Mayne Daly Sr.	1,864	54.25	−3.63
Independent	J. Corcoran	1,572	45.75	
Total valid votes		3,436	100.0	+22.02
Conservative hold		Swing		−3.63
Source: History of the Electoral Districts, Legislatures and Ministries of the Province of Ontario

1871 Ontario general election
Party	Candidate	Votes	%	±%
Conservative	Andrew Monteith	1,630	57.88	+0.30
Liberal	Thomas Ballantyne	1,186	42.12	−0.30
Turnout		2,816	68.20	−4.61
Eligible voters		4,129		
Conservative hold		Swing		+0.30
Source: Elections Ontario

1867 Ontario general election
Party	Candidate	Votes	%
Conservative	Andrew Monteith	1,568	57.58
Liberal	David Davidson Hay	1,155	42.42
Total valid votes		2,723	72.81
Eligible voters		3,740	
Conservative pickup new district.			
Source: Elections Ontario
