= David Davidson Hay =

Canadian politician (1828–1908)

David Hay

Ontario MPP
- In office 1874–1883
- Preceded by: Thomas Mayne Daly
- Succeeded by: John Hess
- Constituency: Perth North

Personal details
- Born: January 28, 1828; Dundee, Scotland
- Died: June 14, 1908 (aged 80); Stratford, Ontario
- Political party: Liberal
- Spouse: Jane Rogerson (m. 1849)
- Relations: F. Wellington Hay, nephew
- Occupation: Civil servant

David Davidson Hay (January 28, 1828 – June 14, 1908) was an Ontario political figure. He represented Perth North in the Legislative Assembly of Ontario from 1875 to 1883 as a Liberal member.

He was born in Dundee, Scotland in 1828. In 1849, he married Jane Rogerson. He served as reeve for Elma Township and Listowel. Hay was Immigration Commissioner to Scotland for Ontario from 1873 to 1874 and General Immigration Agent for Ontario from 1874 to 1875. He ran unsuccessfully for the same seat in the provincial assembly in 1867. Hay moved to Stratford in 1884 after he was named registrar of deeds for North Perth.

His nephew F. Wellington Hay later served in the provincial assembly and the House of Commons.

== Electoral history ==
1867 Ontario general election: Perth North
Party	Candidate	Votes	%
Conservative	Andrew Monteith	1,568	57.58
Liberal	David Davidson Hay	1,155	42.42
Total valid votes		2,723	72.81
Eligible voters		3,740	
Conservative pickup new district.			
Source: Elections Ontario

1875 Ontario general election: Perth North
Party	Candidate	Votes	%	±%
Liberal	David Davidson Hay	1,847	51.69	
Conservative	Thomas Mayne Daly Sr.	1,707	47.77	−6.47
Conservative	David Campbell	9	0.25	
Conservative	R. Keyes	9	0.25	
Conservative	G. Towner	1	0.03	
Total valid votes		3,573	68.16	
Eligible voters		5,242		
Liberal gain from Conservative		Swing		+3.24
Source: Elections Ontario

1879 Ontario general election: Perth North
Party	Candidate	Votes	%	±%
Liberal	David Davidson Hay	2,396	50.18	−1.52
Conservative	Mr. McDermott	2,379	49.82	+1.52
Total valid votes		4,775	67.44	−0.72
Eligible voters		7,080		
Liberal hold		Swing		−1.52
Source: Elections Ontario
