= John George Hess =

Canadian politician

John G. Hess

Ontario MPP
- In office 1883–1890
- Preceded by: David Hay
- Succeeded by: Alfred Emanuel Ahrens
- Constituency: Perth North

Personal details
- Born: November 3, 1838; Beerfelden, Germany
- Died: February 27, 1915 (aged 76); Stratford, Ontario
- Political party: Conservative
- Spouse: Elizabeth Hueffner (m. 1860)

John George Hess (November 3, 1838 – February 27, 1915) was an Ontario businessman and political figure. He represented Perth North in the Legislative Assembly of Ontario as a Conservative from 1883 to 1890.

He was born in Beerfelden, Germany in 1838, the son of Jacob Hess and Anne Marie Seip, and came to Canada West with his family in 1858, settling in Berlin (later Kitchener, Ontario). He married Elizabeth Hueffner in 1860. Hess manufactured furniture. He served on the town council and was mayor of Listowel in 1883. Hess was defeated when he ran for reelection in 1891. In 1893, he was named customs collector for Stratford.
