= James Nicol Grieve =

Canadian politician

James Nicol Grieve (July 17, 1855 – August 4, 1918) was a farmer and political figure in Ontario, Canada. He represented Perth North in the House of Commons of Canada from 1891 to 1896 as a Liberal member.

He was born in Mornington Township, Canada West, the son of Scottish immigrants. He married Ella O. F. Hutchison. He was deputy reeve for Mornington Township from 1892 to 1893. Grieve's election in 1891 was overturned on appeal but he won the subsequent by-election in 1892. He was defeated when he ran for reelection in 1896. Grieve was also a director of the Elma Fire Insurance Company and the Farmer's Institute for the North Region of Perth.

1891 Canadian federal election: Perth North
Party	Candidate	Votes
Liberal	James Nicol Grieve	2,520
Conservative	Samuel Rollin Hesson	2,449

By-election: On election being declared void, 19 May 1892: Perth North
Party	Candidate	Votes
Liberal	GRIEVE, James Nicol	acclaimed

1896 Canadian federal election: Perth North
Party	Candidate	Votes
Conservative	Alex. F. MacLaren	2,916
Liberal	James N. Grieve	2,870
