= James Pitt Mabee =

Canadian judge

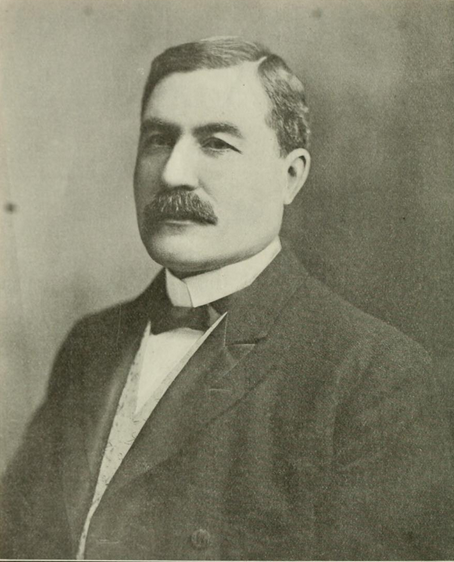
- Born: November 5, 1859; Port Rowan, Canada West
- Died: May 6, 1912 (aged 52); Toronto, Ontario
- Occupations: lawyer, judge, and railway commissioner
- Known for: head of the Board of Railway Commissioners

James Pitt Mabee (November 5, 1859 – May 6, 1912) was a Canadian lawyer, judge, and railway commissioner.

Born in Port Rowan, Canada West, Mabee studied at University of Toronto and Osgoode Hall before being called to the Bar in 1882. A lawyer, he ran unsuccessfully as the Liberal Party of Canada candidate against Alexander Ferguson MacLaren in the riding of Perth North in the Federal election of 1904. In 1905, he was appointed the first chairman of the Canadian section of the International Waterways Commission. Later in 1905, he resigned when he was appointed the chancery division of the Ontario Superior Court of Justice. In 1908. he was appointed head of the Board of Railway Commissioners succeeding Albert Clements Killam. He served until getting appendicitis in April 1912. He died of the complications from gangrene in May 1912 and was buried in the Anglican cemetery at Port Rowan.
