= Joseph Monteith =

Canadian politician

Ontario MPP
- In office 1923–1934
- Preceded by: Wellington Hay
- Succeeded by: Riding abolished
- Constituency: Perth North

Personal details
- Born: June 2, 1865 Stratford, Canada West
- Died: January 8, 1934 (aged 68)
- Party: Conservative
- Spouse: Alice Mary Chowen (m. 1895)
- Relations: Andrew Monteith, father J. Waldo Monteith, son
- Education: Trinity College, Toronto
- Occupation: Physician

Joseph Dunsmore Monteith (June 2, 1865 – January 8, 1934) was an Ontario MLA for Perth North from 1923 to 1934. He was treasurer from 1926 to 1930 and Minister of Labour, Public Works and Highways from 1930 to 1934.

Monteith, a physician born near Stratford, was the son of Andrew Monteith. He was educated in Stratford and studied medicine at Trinity College, Toronto. In 1895, he married Alice Mary Chowen. He served as mayor of Stratford from 1917 to 1918. Monteith defeated Francis Wellington Hay to win the seat in the provincial assembly in 1923. He died in office in 1934.

His son J. Waldo Monteith later became a member of the House of Commons.

Preceded by William Herbert Price	Treasurer of Ontario; 1926-1930	Succeeded by Edward Arunah Dunlop
