= James Palmer Rankin =

Canadian politician

The Honourable James Palmer Rankin

Canadian Senator from Ontario
- In office September 9, 1925 – June 15, 1934
- Appointed by: William Lyon Mackenzie King

Member of Parliament for Perth North
- In office 1908–1911
- Preceded by: Alexander Ferguson MacLaren
- Succeeded by: Hugh Boulton Morphy
- In office 1921–1925
- Preceded by: Hugh Boulton Morphy
- Succeeded by: Wellington Hay

Personal details
- Born: April 30, 1855 East Zorra, Canada West
- Died: June 15, 1934 (aged 79) Stratford, Ontario, Canada
- Party: Liberal

James Palmer Rankin (April 30, 1855 – June 15, 1934) was a physician and political figure in Ontario, Canada. He represented Perth North in the House of Commons of Canada from 1908 to 1911 and from 1921 to 1925 as a Liberal. Rankin then sat for Perth North division in the Senate of Canada from 1925 to 1934.

== Background ==
He was born in East Zorra, Canada West, the son of David Rankin and Jane P. Dennis, and was educated in Cobourg and Hamilton, then at the University of Toronto and University of Edinburgh. Rankin practised as a physician and surgeon in Stratford, Ontario. He married Mary Jane McKee in 1880. He served as a lieutenant-colonel in the Canadian Army Medical Corps during World War I. Rankin was defeated by Hugh Boulton Morphy when he ran for reelection to the House of Commons in 1911 and 1917, then defeated Morphy in the 1921 federal election. He died in office in Stratford at the age of 79.

== Electoral record ==
1908 Canadian federal election: Perth North
Party	Candidate	Votes
Liberal	James Palmer Rankin	3,514
Conservative	Alexander Ferguson MacLaren	3,473

1921 Canadian federal election: Perth North
Party	Candidate	Votes
Liberal	James Palmer Rankin	6,030
Conservative	Hugh Boulton Morphy	5,274
Progressive	William Andrew Amos	3,425
