= James Torrance =

Canadian politician

Ontario MPP
- In office 1905–1916
- Preceded by: John Brown
- Succeeded by: Francis Hay
- Constituency: Perth North

Personal details
- Born: September 3, 1855; Grenville County, Canada West
- Died: May 11, 1923 (aged 67); Victoria County, Ontario
- Political party: Conservative
- Spouse: May Florence Gilles (m.1883)
- Profession: Postmaster

James Torrance (September 3, 1855 – May 11, 1923) was an Ontario merchant and political figure. He represented Perth North in the Legislative Assembly of Ontario as a Conservative member from 1905 to 1916.

He was born in Edwardsburgh Township, Ontario, Grenville County, Canada West, the son of John Torrance, and came to Mornington Township in Perth County while still an infant. Torrance was educated at Collingwood and Brantford. In 1883, he married May Florence Gilles. He was postmaster and was reeve for Milverton in 1896. Torrance served on the county council from 1897 to 1904 and was county warden in 1898. He died on May 11, 1923.
