= Alfred Emanuel Ahrens =

Canadian politician

Member of the Ontario Provincial Parliament for Perth North
- In office June 5, 1890 – February 6, 1891
- Preceded by: John George Hess
- Succeeded by: Thomas Magwood

Personal details
- Party: Liberal

Alfred Emanuel Ahrens was a Canadian politician from Ontario. He was elected to the Legislative Assembly of Ontario in Perth North in the 1890 Ontario general election but one year later he was unseated when his election declared void.

== See also ==
- 7th Parliament of Ontario
