= Alexander Ferguson MacLaren =

Canadian politician

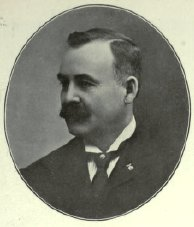

Member of the Canadian Parliament for Perth North
- In office 1896–1908
- Preceded by: James Nicol Grieve
- Succeeded by: James Palmer Rankin

Personal details
- Born: February 3, 1854 Lanark, Canada West
- Died: April 19, 1917 (aged 63) Toronto, Ontario, Canada
- Party: Conservative

Alexander Ferguson MacLaren (February 3, 1854 – April 19, 1917) was a Canadian manufacturer, exporter and politician.

Born in Perth, Lanark County, Canada West, the son of John MacLaren, a native of Perthshire, Scotland, MacLaren moved to Cromarty in Perth County with his family while still young. He was employed with a dairyman to learn cheese making but soon joined Thomas Ballantyne, a major cheese manufacturer and exporter. In 1890, MacLaren established his own cheese exporting business in Stratford. He was one of the judges at the 1893 World's Fair in Chicago and was the sole judge for the dairy products at the Toronto and Ottawa fairs. He was also President of the Ontario Dairymen's Association. MacLaren's company established offices in Toronto, Detroit, Chicago, New York City, London (England), Mexico, China, Japan and Africa. He was also president of the Imperial Wood Fibre Plaster Company, president of the Imperial Veneer Company and served on the board of directors of a number of other companies. In 1895, he married Janet McLeod.

He was first elected to the House of Commons of Canada for the electoral district of Perth North at the general elections of 1896. A Conservative, he was re-elected in 1900 and 1904. He was defeated in 1908. MacLaren died in Toronto from kidney problems.

In 1920, his company was purchased by J. L. Kraft and Brothers Company.

== Electoral record ==
1896 Canadian federal election: Perth North
| Party | Candidate | Votes |
|---|---|---|
| Conservative | Alex. F. MacLaren | 2,916 |
| Liberal | James N. Grieve | 2,870 |

1900 Canadian federal election: Perth North
| Party | Candidate | Votes |
|---|---|---|
| Conservative | A. F. MacLaren | 3,118 |
| Liberal | George Goetz | 2,838 |

1904 Canadian federal election: Perth North
| Party | Candidate | Votes |
|---|---|---|
| Conservative | Alexander Ferguson MacLaren | 3,618 |
| Liberal | James P. Mabee | 3,298 |

1908 Canadian federal election: Perth North
| Party | Candidate | Votes |
|---|---|---|
| Liberal | James Palmer Rankin | 3,514 |
| Conservative | Alexander Ferguson MacLaren | 3,473 |
