= Thomas Magwood =

Canadian politician

John G. Hess

Ontario MPP
- In office 1891–1898
- Preceded by: Alfred Emanuel Ahrens
- Succeeded by: John Brown
- Constituency: Perth North

Personal details
- Born: March 28, 1851; East Flamborough Township, Wentworth County, Canada West
- Died: December 15, 1933 (aged 82); Stratford, Ontario
- Political party: Conservative
- Spouse: Elizabeth Magwood (m. 1881)

Thomas Magwood (March 28, 1851 – December 15, 1933) was an Ontario farmer and political figure. He represented Perth North in the Legislative Assembly of Ontario as a Conservative member from 1891 to 1898.

He was born in East Flamborough Township, Wentworth County, Canada West in 1851. He served on the township council for Mornington. In 1881, he married Elizabeth Magwood. He was elected in an 1890 by-election held after the election of Alfred Emanuel Ahrens was declared invalid. He died in 1933.
