= Samuel Rollin Hesson =

Canadian politician

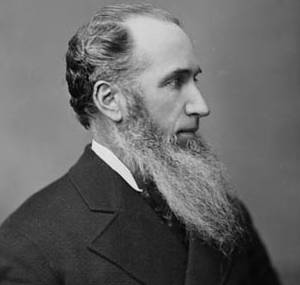
Samuel Rollin Hesson Source: Library and Archives Canada

Samuel Rollin Hesson (September 29, 1829 – November 19, 1915) was an Irish-born merchant and political figure in Ontario, Canada. He represented Perth North in the House of Commons of Canada from 1878 to 1891 as a Conservative member.

He was born in County Antrim, the son of John Hesson and Elizabeth Dunbar, and came to Ogdensburg, New York with his family in 1831; the family moved to Upper Canada the following year. Hesson was educated in Dundas. The family moved to Stratford in 1843. Hesson worked in the lumber trade and taught school before becoming a merchant. He was named a justice of the peace and also served as postmaster for Sebringville. Hesson was a member of the town council for Stratford and served as mayor in 1875. He also served as a director for the Stratford Gas Company and chairman of the board of trustees for the Stratford, Lake Huron and Georgian Bay Railway. Hesson was defeated when he ran for reelection in 1891. He died in Stratford at the age of 86.

== Electoral record ==
1878 Canadian federal election: Perth North
Party	Candidate	Votes
Conservative	Samuel Rollin Hesson	2,533
Independent	J. Fisher	2,450

1882 Canadian federal election: Perth North
Party	Candidate	Votes
Conservative	Samuel Rollin Hesson	1,934
Independent	Robert Jones	1,682

1887 Canadian federal election: Perth North
Party	Candidate	Votes
Conservative	Samuel Rollin Hesson	2,382
Liberal	James Johnson	2,182

1891 Canadian federal election: Perth North
Party	Candidate	Votes
Liberal	James Nicol Grieve	2,520
Conservative	Samuel Rollin Hesson	2,449
