= John Brown (Ontario MPP) =

Canadian politician

Ontario MPP
- In office 1903–1904
- Preceded by: John C. Monteith
- Succeeded by: James Torrance
- In office 1898–1902
- Preceded by: Thomas Magwood
- Succeeded by: John C. Monteith
- Constituency: Perth North

Personal details
- Born: October 19, 1849; Downie Township, Canada West
- Died: October 17, 1924 (aged 74); Stratford, Ontario
- Political party: Liberal
- Spouse: Isabella Gunn

John Brown (October 19, 1849 – October 17, 1924) was a general agent and politician in Ontario, Canada. He represented Perth North in the Legislative Assembly of Ontario from 1898 to 1902 and from 1903 to 1904 as a Liberal.

He was born in Downie township, Perth County, Canada West. Brown was mayor of Stratford from 1890 to 1891. He married Isabella Gunn.

Brown was first elected to the Ontario assembly in 1898. He was defeated by John C. Monteith in 1902 but that election was declared invalid and Brown was elected in a 1903 by-election.
