= James Redford (politician) =

Canadian politician

House of Commons of Canada
- In office 1867–1872
- Preceded by: None
- Succeeded by: Thomas Mayne Daly Sr.

Personal details
- Born: 18 September 1821 Lilliesleaf, Roxburghshire, Scotland
- Died: 18 December 1908 (aged 87) Austin, Texas, United States
- Party: Liberal Party of Canada

James Redford (18 September 1821 – 18 December 1908) was an Ontario businessman and political figure. He represented Perth North in the House of Commons of Canada as a Liberal member from 1867 to 1872.

Redford was born in Lilliesleaf, Roxburghshire, Scotland in 1821, to a father who was also named James Redford. The younger Redford was educated there and went to Canada West in 1842. He was a schoolteacher for a time, and was later a banker, lumber merchant, manufacturer, and land speculator in Stratford and Mitchell. In 1851, Redford married Elizabeth Gouray. He served as superintendent of schools in Perth County and a member of the Stratford town council. He was a director of the Royal Canadian Bank and also served as captain in the local militia. Redford moved to Austin, Texas around 1876 and died there at the age of 87.

1867 Canadian federal election: Perth North
| Party | Candidate | Votes |
|---|---|---|
| Liberal | James Redford | 1,515 |
| Liberal-Conservative | Thomas Mayne Daly Sr. | 1,307 |
| Unknown | Grey | 0 |
Source: Canadian Elections Database

1872 Canadian federal election: Perth North
| Party | Candidate | Votes |
|---|---|---|
| Liberal-Conservative | Thomas Mayne Daly Sr. | 1,848 |
| Liberal | James Redford | 1,792 |
Source: Canadian Elections Database

1874 Canadian federal election: Perth North
| Party | Candidate | Votes |
|---|---|---|
| Conservative | Andrew Monteith | 1,992 |
| Liberal | James Redford | 1,829 |
Source: lop.parl.ca

Parliament of Canada
| Preceded by None | Member of Parliament for Perth North; 1867–1872 | Succeeded by Thomas Mayne Daly Sr. |
