= J. C. Tolmie =

Canadian politician

Reverend Major James Craig Tolmie (October 8, 1862 – May 15, 1938) was a Canadian politician, presbyterian clergyman, military chaplain and soldier.

== Biography ==
James Craig Tolmie was born in Oxford County, Canada West as the son of another Presbyterian minister, Reverend Andrew Tolmie (1826–1907). His father had served in Oxford County at Innerkip Presbyterian Church and Ratho Church Blandford Township, since his graduation from Toronto's Knox College in 1852. Shortly after James' birth, the family moved to the shores of Lake Huron at Southampton, where his father became minister of the Canada Presbyterian Congregations in Southampton (merged in 1864), Tara (to 1874), and West Arran/Burgoyne (to 1891), and served until his retirement in 1897, and death in 1907.

James C. Tolmie, followed in his father's footsteps, graduating from University of Toronto in Arts and Law in 1885, and Knox College in 1888. He worked at St. Andrew's Church in London, Ontario, and was then ordained and inducted into First Presbyterian Church, Brantford in April 1889. In early 1894, he was called to Windsor, Ontario to the St. Andrew's congregation, where he resigned early in 1915.

He was first elected to the Legislative Assembly of Ontario in 1914 as the Liberal Member of the Legislative Assembly (MLA) for Windsor. He resigned from the Pastorate at St. Andrew's, and was appointed minister Emeritus.

During World War I, he also served as chaplain for the 99th Battalion of the Canadian Expeditionary Force. He was a candidate in the 1919 Ontario Liberal leadership convention, placing second, 37 votes behind Hartley Dewart on the second ballot. Tolmie ran for the leadership again at the 1922 Ontario Liberal leadership convention, losing to Wellington Hay. He was defeated in June 1923, losing to the Conservative candidate Frank Worthington Wilson, and returned to Southampton, becoming involved in civic life in that community, and remained with the Presbyterian cause after Church Union in 1925, providing regular pulpit supply, and preaching at a number of Anniversary Services in the region. He was Reeve of Southampton at the time of his death, and had completed a three-year term on the Presbyterian Church's Committee on Church History.

In nearby Port Elgin (amalgamated into Saugeen Shores, Ontario in 1999), there is a Tolmie Memorial Presbyterian Church, a "minority group" who did not join Port Elgin United Church in 1925 and named in memory of the Tolmie Family.
