= Perth North (federal electoral district) =

Former federal electoral district in Ontario, Canada

Ontario electoral district

Defunct federal electoral district
- Legislature: House of Commons
- District created: 1867
- District abolished: 1933
- First contested: 1867
- Last contested: 1930

Perth North was a federal electoral district represented in the House of Commons of Canada from 1867 to 1935. It was located in the province of Ontario. It was created by the British North America Act 1867 which divided the County of Perth into two ridings.

The North Riding of the County of Perth consisted of the Townships of Wallace, Elma, Logan, Ellice, Mornington, and North Easthope, and the Town of Stratford.

In 1882, it was redefined to consist of the townships of Ellice, Elma, Mornington and Logan, the towns of Stratford and Listowel, and the village of Milverton. In 1903, it was redefined to include the township of Easthope North. In 1914, it was redefined to include the township of Wallace, and exclude the township of Logan.

In 1924, Perth North was defined to consist of the part of the county of Perth lying north of and including the township of Easthope North, the city of Stratford, and the townships of Ellice and Elma.

The electoral district was abolished in 1933 when it was merged into Perth riding.

== Members of Parliament ==
This riding has elected the following members of Parliament:

Parliament	Years	Member	Party
1st	1867–1872	James Redford	Liberal
2nd	1872–1874	Thomas Mayne Daly Sr.	Liberal–Conservative
3rd	1874–1875	Andrew Monteith	Conservative
3rd	1875–1878	Andrew Monteith	Conservative
4th	1878–1882	Samuel Rollin Hesson	Conservative
5th	1882–1887	Samuel Rollin Hesson	Conservative
6th	1887–1891	Samuel Rollin Hesson	Conservative
7th	1891–1892	James Nicol Grieve	Liberal
7th	1892–1896	James Nicol Grieve	Liberal
8th	1896–1900	Alexander Ferguson MacLaren	Conservative
9th	1900–1904	Alexander Ferguson MacLaren	Conservative
10th	1904–1908	Alexander Ferguson MacLaren	Conservative
11th	1908–1911	James Palmer Rankin	Liberal
12th	1911–1917	Hugh Boulton Morphy	Conservative
13th	1917–1921	Hugh Boulton Morphy	Government (Unionist)
14th	1921–1925	James Palmer Rankin	Liberal
15th	1925–1926	David McKenzie Wright	Conservative
16th	1926–1930	Wellington Hay	Liberal
17th	1930–1935	David McKenzie Wright	Conservative
Riding dissolved into Perth

== Election history ==
1867 Canadian federal election: Perth North
Party	Candidate	Votes
Liberal	James Redford	1,515
Liberal-Conservative	Thomas Mayne Daly Sr.	1,307
Unknown	Grey	0
Source: Canadian Elections Database

1872 Canadian federal election: Perth North
Party	Candidate	Votes
Liberal-Conservative	Thomas Mayne Daly Sr.	1,848
Liberal	James Redford	1,792
Source: Canadian Elections Database

1874 Canadian federal election: Perth North
Party	Candidate	Votes
Conservative	Andrew Monteith	1,992
Liberal	James Redford	1,829
Source: lop.parl.ca

By-election: On Mr. Monteith being unseated on petition, 7 July 1875: Perth North
Party	Candidate	Votes
Conservative	Andrew Monteith	1,737
Independent	James Fisher	1,717

1878 Canadian federal election: Perth North
Party	Candidate	Votes
Conservative	Samuel Rollin Hesson	2,533
Independent	J. Fisher	2,450

1882 Canadian federal election: Perth North
Party	Candidate	Votes
Conservative	Samuel Rollin Hesson	1,934
Independent	Robert Jones	1,682

1887 Canadian federal election: Perth North
Party	Candidate	Votes
Conservative	Samuel Rollin Hesson	2,382
Liberal	James Johnson	2,182

1891 Canadian federal election: Perth North
Party	Candidate	Votes
Liberal	James Nicol Grieve	2,520
Conservative	Samuel Rollin Hesson	2,449

By-election: On election being declared void, 19 May 1892: Perth North
Party	Candidate	Votes
Liberal	James Nicol Grieve	acclaimed

1896 Canadian federal election: Perth North
Party	Candidate	Votes
Conservative	Alex. F. MacLaren	2,916
Liberal	James N. Grieve	2,870

1900 Canadian federal election: Perth North
Party	Candidate	Votes
Conservative	A. F. MacLaren	3,118
Liberal	George Goetz	2,838

1904 Canadian federal election: Perth North
Party	Candidate	Votes
Conservative	Alexander Ferguson MacLaren	3,618
Liberal	James P. Mabee	3,298

1908 Canadian federal election: Perth North
Party	Candidate	Votes
Liberal	James Palmer Rankin	3,514
Conservative	Alexander Ferguson MacLaren	3,473

1911 Canadian federal election: Perth North
Party	Candidate	Votes
Conservative	Hugh Boulton Morphy	3,741
Liberal	James Palmer Rankin	3,244

1917 Canadian federal election: Perth North
Party	Candidate	Votes
Government	Hugh Boulton Morphy	5,977
Opposition	James Palmer Rankin	4,109

1921 Canadian federal election
Party	Candidate	Votes
Liberal	James Palmer Rankin	6,030
Conservative	Hugh Boulton Morphy	5,274
Progressive	William Andrew Amos	3,425

1925 Canadian federal election
Party	Candidate	Votes
Conservative	David McKenzie Wright	7,386
Liberal	Tom Brown	6,725

1926 Canadian federal election: Perth North
Party	Candidate	Votes
Liberal	Francis Wellington Hay	8,236
Conservative	David McKenzie Wright	7,596

1930 Canadian federal election
Party	Candidate	Votes
Conservative	David M. Wright	8,726
Liberal	David Smith	7,850
Source: lop.parl.ca

== See also ==
- List of Canadian electoral districts
- Historical federal electoral districts of Canada
