= Wellington Hay =

Canadian politician

Member of Parliament for Perth North
- In office 1926–1930
- Preceded by: David McKenzie Wright
- Succeeded by: David McKenzie Wright

Ontario MPP
- In office 1916–1923
- Preceded by: John Brown
- Succeeded by: Joseph Monteith
- Constituency: Perth North

Personal details
- Born: November 17, 1864 Listowel, Canada West
- Died: April 1, 1932 (aged 67) Stratford, Ontario
- Party: Liberal
- Relations: David Hay, uncle
- Occupation: Grain merchant

Francis Wellington Hay (November 17, 1864 – April 1, 1932) was a grain merchant and Canadian politician.

Hay was born in Listowel, Canada West, the son of William G. Hay. He worked for the Federal Bank for three years before entering the family grain business. He was mayor of Listowel from 1903 to 1904. Hay was defeated by James Torrance for a seat in the provincial assembly in 1914; he won a by-election in 1916 and represented the provincial riding of Perth North until 1923. He served as leader of the Ontario Liberal Party in the provincial legislature from 1921 to 1923, and was formally elected leader at the 1922 Ontario Liberal Party leadership convention, but resigned after he led the party through the 1923 Ontario general election that saw the Liberals drop in representation from 27 to 14 seats and Hay losing his own seat.

In 1926 he was elected to the House of Commons as a member of the Liberal Party but did not run for re-election in 1930.

His uncle David Davidson Hay had previously served in the provincial assembly. His brother J. Nelson Hay also served as mayor of Listowel.

Party political offices
Preceded by Hartley Dewart	Ontario Liberal leaders 1921–1923	Succeeded by W. E. N. Sinclair
