= 13th Parliament of Ontario =

1911–1914 term of the Legislative Assembly of Ontario, Canada

←	12th	14th	→
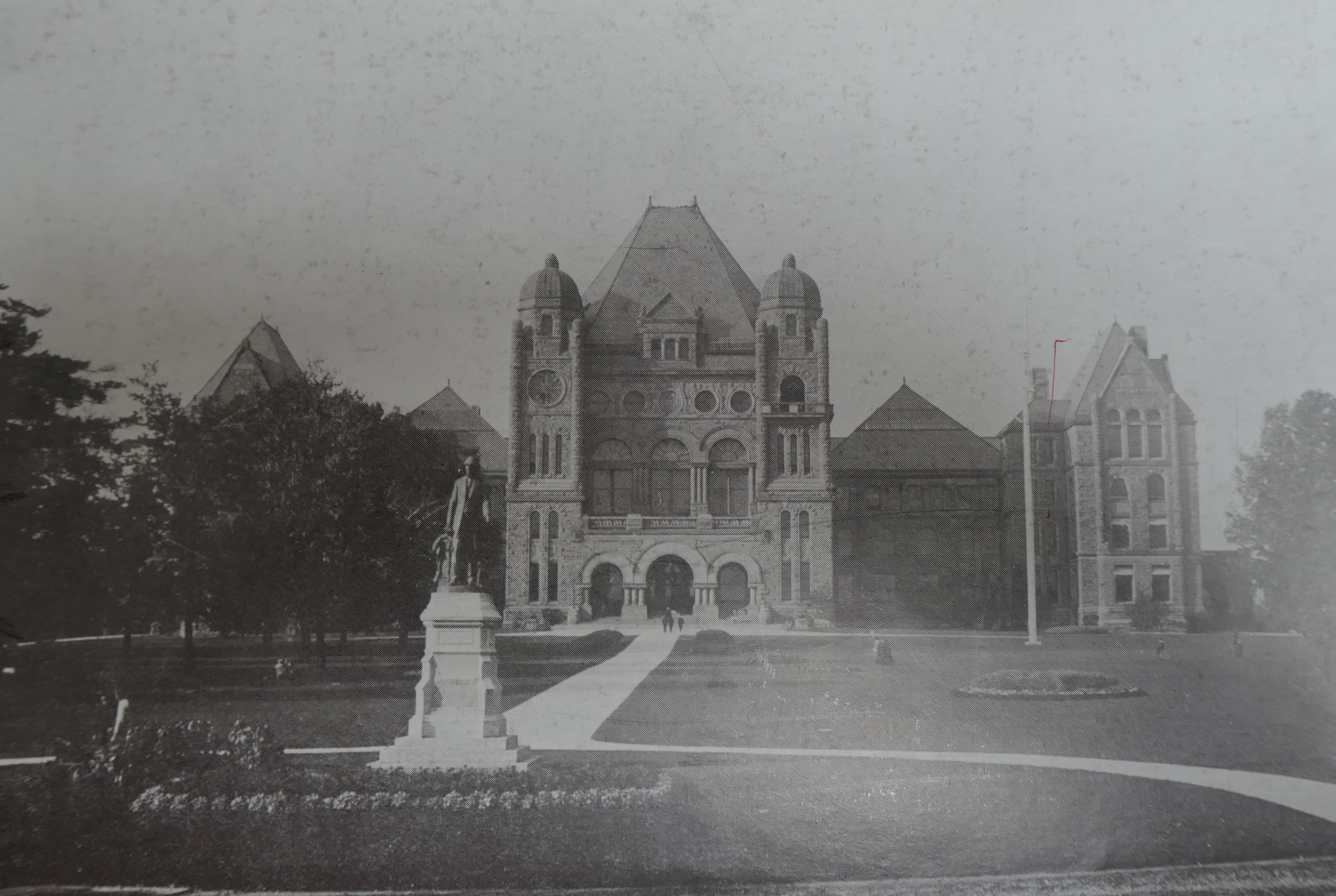
- Ontario Legislative Building ca. 1910

Overview
- Legislative body: Legislative Assembly
- Jurisdiction: Ontario, Canada
- Meeting place: Ontario Legislative Building
- Term: December 11, 1911 – May 29, 1914
- Election: 1911 Election
- Government: Whitney ministry Conservative Party
- Opposition: Liberal Party
- Members: 106
- Speaker: William Henry Hoyle
- Premier: Sir James Whitney
- Leader of the Opposition: Newton Rowell
- Party control: 83 / 106(78%)

The 13th Parliament of Ontario, or the 13th Legislature of Ontario (the term used in formal records of the day) was the legislature of the Government of Ontario that was in office from December 11, 1911, until May 29, 1914. It composed primarily of members elected in the Ontario general election held on December 11, 1911, which delivered the third of four super-majority governing mandates to the Conservative Party led by Premier Sir James Whitney. It was dissolved prior to the 1914 general election.

== Standing post 1911 election ==
When the 12th Parliament was dissolved, it was the fifth times James Whitney led the Conservative Party into election battles, but the first time as Sir James. Though he secured the largest share of the popular votes of the six election he contested, the conservative party actually won slightly fewer seats than from the 1908 election. The Whitney ministry however continued to be sustained by an overwhelming super-majority in the 13th Parliament.

The government was further strengthened by the unexpected misfortune in the opposition rank. A.G MacKay, who led the opposition Liberals in the two previous parliaments and the only Liberals with cabinet experience remaining after the 1908 election, was hit by a salacious law suits (which was later proven unfounded) and resigned just days before the 1911 election campaign was to start. In the new parliament, sitting across from Whitney was Newton Rowell, a Toronto barrister prominent in the Liberal circles for a number of years who had never ran for office prior to the 1911 election. Rowell accepted the Liberal leadership on the condition that his temperance stance be accepted by the party, an issue that would dominate political discourse for the next two decades.

The 13th Parliament consisted of sixty-eight members who served in the 12th Parliament, plus one member (Edward Arunah Dunlop of Renfrew North) who served previously but not in the 12th Parliament.

Thirty-seven members of the 13th Parliament were first time members. Among them, twenty-four were Conservatives (including one who ran as Liberal-Conservative) and thirteen were Liberals, including the leader of the opposition Newton Rowell. Nineteen of the new members succeeded retired members from the same party.Eighteen new members won their seats from another party.

Political party	Party leader	12th Parliament members					1911 Election		13th Parliament			
Political party	Party leader	elected 1908	at diss.	at 1911 elections			1911 Election		Same party		Changed	
Political party	Party leader	elected 1908	at diss.	Stood down	Re-elect	Defeated	Vote %	Seats	Inc. Ret'ed	New member	Open seat	Ousted incum.
Conservative (Note: figures inclusive of one MPP elected as Liberal-Conservative)	James P. Whitney	86	87	21	58	8	55.90	83	58	17	4	4
Liberal	Newton Rowell	19	18	6	9	3	38.51	22	9	2	4	7
Labour	–	1	1	–	1	–	2.43	1	1	–	–	–
Total		106	106	27	68	11		106	68	19	8	11

Seventeen Conservative members were returned by acclamation, the highest number of acclamation ever in Ontario electoral history. Five of the acclaimed members were first time members. One member, who served in previous parliaments was acclaimed to a seat held by the Liberals in the 12th Parliament.

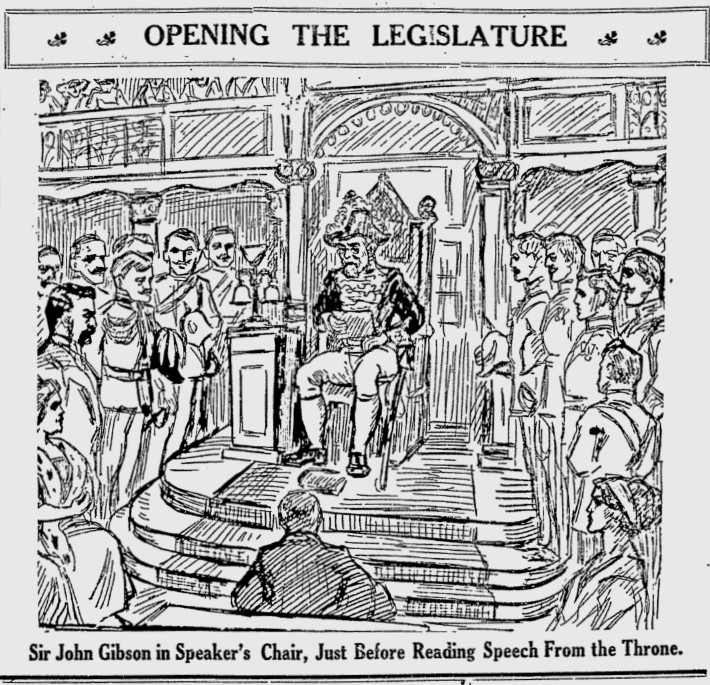
Sir John Morison Gibson, Lieutenant Governor of Ontario, opening the second session of the 13th Parliament of Ontario and delivered the 1913 Speech from the Throne, outlining the program of the Conservative Whitney ministry.

== Sessions ==
The 13th Parliament was convened over three sessions, held in the spring of 1912, 1913, 1914.

Session	Convened	Prorogued
1st	Wednesday, February 7, 1912	Tuesday, April 16, 1912
2nd	Tuesday, February 4, 1913	Friday, May 9, 1913
3rd	Wednesday, February 18, 1914	Friday, May 1, 1914

William Henry Hoyle served as Speaker of the Legislative Assembly for the duration of the 13th Parliament.

=== Change in party standing ===
Political party	Party leader	12th Parl.		1911	1st session		2nd session		3rd session	
Political party	Party leader	1908	diss.	1911	start	end	start	end	start	diss.
Conservative (Note: figures inclusive of one MPP elected as Liberal-Conservative)	James P. Whitney	86	86	83	82	82	82	▲83	▲84	84
Liberal	Newton Rowell	19	18	22	22	22	▼21	▼20	20	20
Labour	–	1	1	1	1	1	1	1	1	1
Members at divisions		106	105	106	105	105	104	104	105	105
Speaker		–	1	–	1	1	1	1	1	1
Vacant							1	1		
Majority		–	67	–	59	59	▲60	▲62	▲63	63

== Presiding officers & parliamentary leaders ==
Government		Opposition	
	George V (1910–36); King of the United Kingdom (Note: Prior to the Statute of Westminster 1931, Canada was strictly speaking a dominion of the British Empire, thus did not have its own Crown per se.)		
	SirJohn Morison Gibson; Lieutenant Governor		
	William Henry Hoyle, Speaker; Ontario North		
Premier; Conservative Party Leader	Sir James Whitney; Dundas	Newton Rowell; Oxford North	Leader of the Opposition; Liberal Party Leader
Designated Acting Premier de facto deputy leader (Note: Foy was designated as acting Premier on every occasions that the Premier is unavailable, which was often)	James Joseph Foy; Toronto North - B		

== Members of the Assembly ==
Riding	Member	Party	First elected / previously elected	No. of terms	Comments
Addington	William David Black	Conservative	1911	1st term	
Algoma	Albert Grigg	Conservative	1908	2nd term	
Brant	John Wesley Westbrook	Conservative	1911	1st term	
Brant South	Willoughby Staples Brewster	Conservative	1908	2nd term	
Brockville	Albert Edward Donovan	Conservative	1907	3rd term	
Bruce Centre	William MacDonald	Liberal	1911	1st term	
Bruce North	Charles Martin Bowman	Liberal	1898	5th term	
Bruce South	John Anderson	Liberal	1911	1st term	
Carleton	Robert Herbert McElroy	Conservative	1907	3rd term	
Dufferin	Charles Robert McKeown	Conservative	1907	3rd term	
Dundas	James Pliny Whitney	Conservative	1888	8th term	Premier
Durham East	Josiah Johnston Preston	Conservative	1902	4th term	
Durham West	John Henry Devitt	Conservative	1905	3rd term	
Elgin East	Charles Andrew Brower	Conservative	1894	6th term	
Elgin West	Findlay George MacDiarmid	Conservative	1898, 1900	6th term*	
Essex North	Joseph Octave Reaume	Conservative	1902	4th term	Minister in the Whitney ministry (Note: As Minister of Public Works)
Essex South	Charles N. Anderson	Conservative	1908	2nd term	
Fort William	Charles William Jarvis	Conservative	1911	1st term	
Frontenac	Anthony McGuin Rankin	Conservative	1911	1st term	
Glengarry	Hugh Munro	Liberal	1911	1st term	
Grenville	George Howard Ferguson	Conservative	1905	3rd term	
Grey Centre	Isaac Benson Lucas	Conservative	1898	5th term	Minister in the Whitney ministry (Note: As a minister without portfolio from 1909 and as Treasurer from 1913)
Grey North	Alexander Grant MacKay	Liberal	1902	4th term	Resignation (Note: A former minister in the Ross ministry, and Liberal Party leader until the eve of the 1911 election, resigned upon being subject of a bizzare lawsuits that was later proven unfounded. Opted to move to Alberta, and later served as Alberta's first health minister in the Stewart ministry, one of a handful of Canadian to have served in provincial cabinet of more than one province.)
Grey North	Colin Stewart Cameron (1913)	Conservative	1913	1st term	Entry via by-election
Grey South	David Jamieson	Conservative	1898	5th term	
Haldimand	Christian Kohler	Liberal	1911	1st term	
Halton	Alfred Westland Nixon	Conservative	1905	3rd term	
Hamilton East	Allan Studholme	Labour	1906	3rd term	
Hamilton West	John Strathearn Hendrie	Conservative	1902	4th term	
Hastings East	Sandy Grant	Conservative	1911	1st term	
Hastings North	John Robert Cooke	Conservative	1911	1st term	
Hastings West	John Wesley Johnson	Conservative	1908	2nd term	
Huron Centre	William Proudfoot	Liberal	1908	2nd term	
Huron North	Armstrong Musgrove	Conservative	1908	2nd term	
Huron South	Henry Eilber	Conservative	1898	5th term	
Kenora	Harold Arthur Clement Machin	Conservative	1908	2nd term	
Kent East	Walter Renwick Ferguson	Liberal	1911	1st term	
Kent West	George William Sulman	Conservative	1908	2nd term	
Kingston	Arthur Edward Ross	Conservative	1911	1st term	
Lambton East	Robert John McCormick	Liberal	1908	2nd term	
Lambton West	William John Hanna	Conservative	1902	4th term	Minister in the Whitney ministry (Note: As Provincial Secretary and Registrar)
Lanark North	Richard Franklin Preston	Conservative	1894, 1905	4th term*	
Lanark South	Arthur James Matheson †	Conservative	1894	6th term	Died in office; minister in the Whitney ministry (Note: as Treasurer until his death on January 25, 1913)
Lanark South	John Charles Ebbs (1913)	Conservative	1913	1st term	Entry via by-election
Leeds	John Robertson Dargavel	Conservative	1905	3rd term	
Lennox	Thomas George Carscallen	Conservative	1902	4th term	
Lincoln	Elisha Jessop	Conservative	1898	5th term	
London	Adam Beck	Conservative	1902	4th term	
Manitoulin	Robert Roswell Gamey	Conservative	1902	4th term	
Middlesex East	Robert Sutherland	Liberal	1911	1st term	Died in office
Middlesex East	George Wesley Neely † (1912)	Conservative	1905, 1912	2nd term*	Entry via by-election; died in office
Middlesex East	John McFarlan † (1913)	Conservative	1913	1st term	Entry via by-election
Middlesex North	Duncan MacArthur	Conservative	1911	1st term	
Middlesex West	John Campbell Elliott	Liberal	1908	2nd term	
Monck	Thomas A. Marshall	Liberal	1911	1st term	
Muskoka	Arthur Arnold Mahaffy	Conservative	1903	4th term	Resignation (Note: Acceptence of an office of profit or emolument under the Crown) (Note: appointed a district court judge)
Muskoka	Samuel Henry Armstrong (1912)	Conservative	1912	1st term	Entry via by-election
Nipissing	Henri Morel	Conservative	1908	2nd term	
Norfolk North	Thomas Robert Atkinson	Liberal	1905, 1911	2nd term*	
Norfolk South	Arthur Clarence Pratt	Conservative	1905	3rd term	
Northumberland East	Samuel Greerson Nesbitt	Conservative	1908	2nd term	
Northumberland West	Samuel Clarke	Liberal	1898	5th term	
Ontario North	William Henry Hoyle	Conservative	1898	5th term	Speaker of the Legislative Assembly
Ontario South	William Edmund Newton Sinclair	Liberal	1911	1st term	
Ottawa East	Napoléon Champagne	Conservative	1911	1st term	
Ottawa West	James Albert Ellis	Conservative	1911	1st term	
Oxford North	Newton Wesley Rowell	Liberal	1911	1st term	Leader of the Opposition
Oxford South	Thomas Richard Mayberry	Liberal	1908	2nd term	
Parry Sound	John Galna	Conservative	1905	3rd term	
Peel	Samuel Charters	Conservative	1908	2nd term	Resignation (Note: for health reasons)
Peel	James Robinson Fallis (1913)	Conservative	1913	1st term	Entry via by-election
Perth North	James Torrance	Conservative	1905	3rd term	
Perth South	John Benneweis	Conservative	1911	1st term	
Peterborough East	James Thompson	Conservative	1908	2nd term	
Peterborough West	Edward Armour Peck	Conservative	1911	1st term	
Port Arthur	Donald McDonald Hogarth	Conservative	1911	1st term	
Prescott	Gustave Évanturel	Liberal	1911	1st term	
Prince Edward	Robert Addison Norman	Conservative	1908	2nd term	
Rainy River	James Arthur Mathieu	Conservative (Note: elected as a Liberal-Conservative)	1911	1st term	
Renfrew North	Edward Arunah Dunlop	Conservative	1903, 1911	3rd term*	
Renfrew South	Thomas William McGarry	Conservative	1905	3rd term	
Russell	Damase Racine	Liberal	1905	3rd term	
Sault Ste. Marie	William Howard Hearst	Conservative	1908	2nd term	Minister in the Whitney ministry (Note: As Minister of Lands, Forests and Mines)
Simcoe Centre	Alfred Burke Thompson	Conservative	1898, 1905	4th term*	
Simcoe East	James Irwin Hartt	Conservative	1911	1st term	
Simcoe South	Alexander Ferguson	Conservative	1906	3rd term	
Simcoe West	James Stoddart Duff	Conservative	1898	5th term	Minister in the Whitney ministry (Note: As Minister of Agriculture)
Stormont	John Colborne Milligan	Conservative	1911	1st term	
Sturgeon Falls	Zotique Mageau	Liberal	1911	1st term	
Sudbury	Charles McCrea	Conservative	1911	1st term	
Timiskaming	Robert Taylor Shillington	Conservative	1908	2nd term	
Toronto East - A	Robert Allan Pyne	Conservative	1898	5th term	Minister in the Whitney ministry (Note: As Minister of Education)
Toronto East - B	Thomas Richard Whitesides	Conservative	1908	2nd term	
Toronto North - A	William Kirkpatrick McNaught	Conservative	1906	3rd term	
Toronto North - B	James Joseph Foy	Conservative	1898	5th term	Minister in the Whitney ministry (Note: As Attorney General; designated as acting premier in Whitney's absence)
Toronto South - A	Edward William James Owens	Conservative	1911	1st term	
Toronto South - B	George Horace Gooderham	Conservative	1908	2nd term	
Toronto West - A	Thomas Crawford	Conservative	1894	6th term	
Toronto West - B	William David McPherson	Conservative	1908	2nd term	
Victoria East	Robert Mercer Mason	Conservative	1909	2nd term	
Victoria West	Adam Edward Vrooman	Conservative	1911	1st term	
Waterloo North	Henry George Lackner	Conservative	1898, 1902	6th term*	Resignation (Note: Appointed sheriff for Waterloo County)
Waterloo North	Charles Henry Mills (1912)	Conservative	1912	1st term	Entry via by-election
Waterloo South	George Pattinson	Conservative	1905	3rd term	
Welland	Evan Eugene Fraser	Conservative	1905	3rd term	
Wellington East	Udney Richardson	Liberal	1911	1st term	
Wellington South	Henry Scholfield	Conservative	1911	1st term	
Wellington West	William Clarke Chambers	Conservative	1911	1st term	
Wentworth North	James McQueen	Liberal	1911	1st term	
Wentworth South	James Thomas Hammill Regan	Conservative	1911	1st term	
York East	Alexander McCowan	Conservative	1905	3rd term	Resignation (Note: Appointed Sheriff of York County)
York East	George Stewart Henry (1913)	Conservative	1913	1st term	Entry via by-election
York North	Thomas Herbert Lennox	Conservative	1905	3rd term	
York West	Forbes Godfrey	Conservative	1907	3rd term	

=== Changes in membership ===
Changes in seats held (1926–1929)
Electoral District	Before			Change	
Electoral District	Date	Reason	Member	New Member	Date
Middlesex East	July 5, 1912	Died	Robert Sutherland	George Neely	October 28, 1912
Waterloo North	September 30, 1912	Resignation (Note: appointed sheriff for Waterloo County)	Henry George Lackner	Charles Henry Mills	October 28, 1912
Muskoka	October 14, 1912	Resignation (Note: appointed District Judge of Muskoka)	Arthur Arnold Mahaffy	Samuel Henry Armstrong	November 7, 1912
Lanark South	January 25, 1913	Died	Arthur James Matheson	John Charles Ebbs	March 26 1913
Grey North	April 12, 1913	Resignation (Note: Relocated to Alberta)	A.G. MacKay	Colin Stewart Cameron	July 14, 1913
Grey Centre	May 13, 1913	Ministerial byelection (Note: by acclamation)	Isaac Benson Lucas		June 2, 1913
York East	August 11, 1913	Resignation (Note: appointed sheriff for York County)	Alexander McCowan	George Stewart Henry	September 8, 1913.
Peel	October 9, 1913	Resignation (Note: appointed registrar of deeds for Peel County)	Samuel Charters	James Robinson Fallis	November 3, 1913
Middlesex East	October 17, 1913	Died	George Neely	John McFarlan	November 27, 1913
