= 1911 Ontario general election =

Canadian provincial election

- December 11, 1911

106 seats in the 13th Legislative Assembly of Ontario 54 seats were needed for a majority
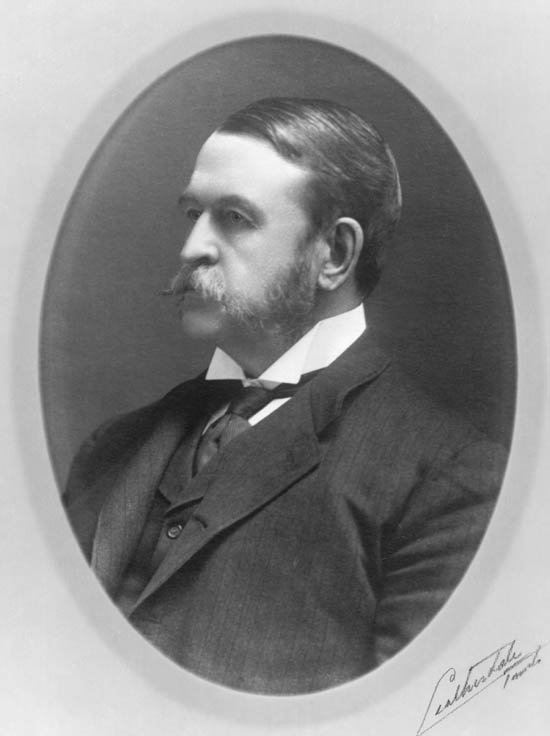

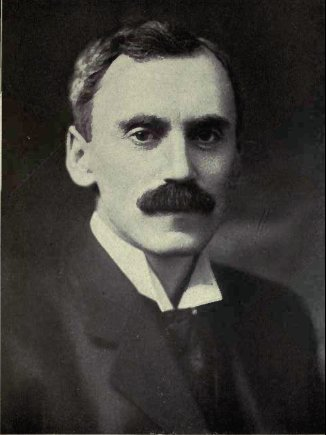
	First party	Second party
Leader	James P. Whitney	Newton Rowell
Party	Conservative	Liberal
Leader since	1896	1911
Leader's seat	Dundas	Oxford North
Last election	86	19
Seats won	82	22
Seat change	▼4	▲3
Percentage	55.6%	38.5%
Swing	▲0.5pp	▼0.9pp
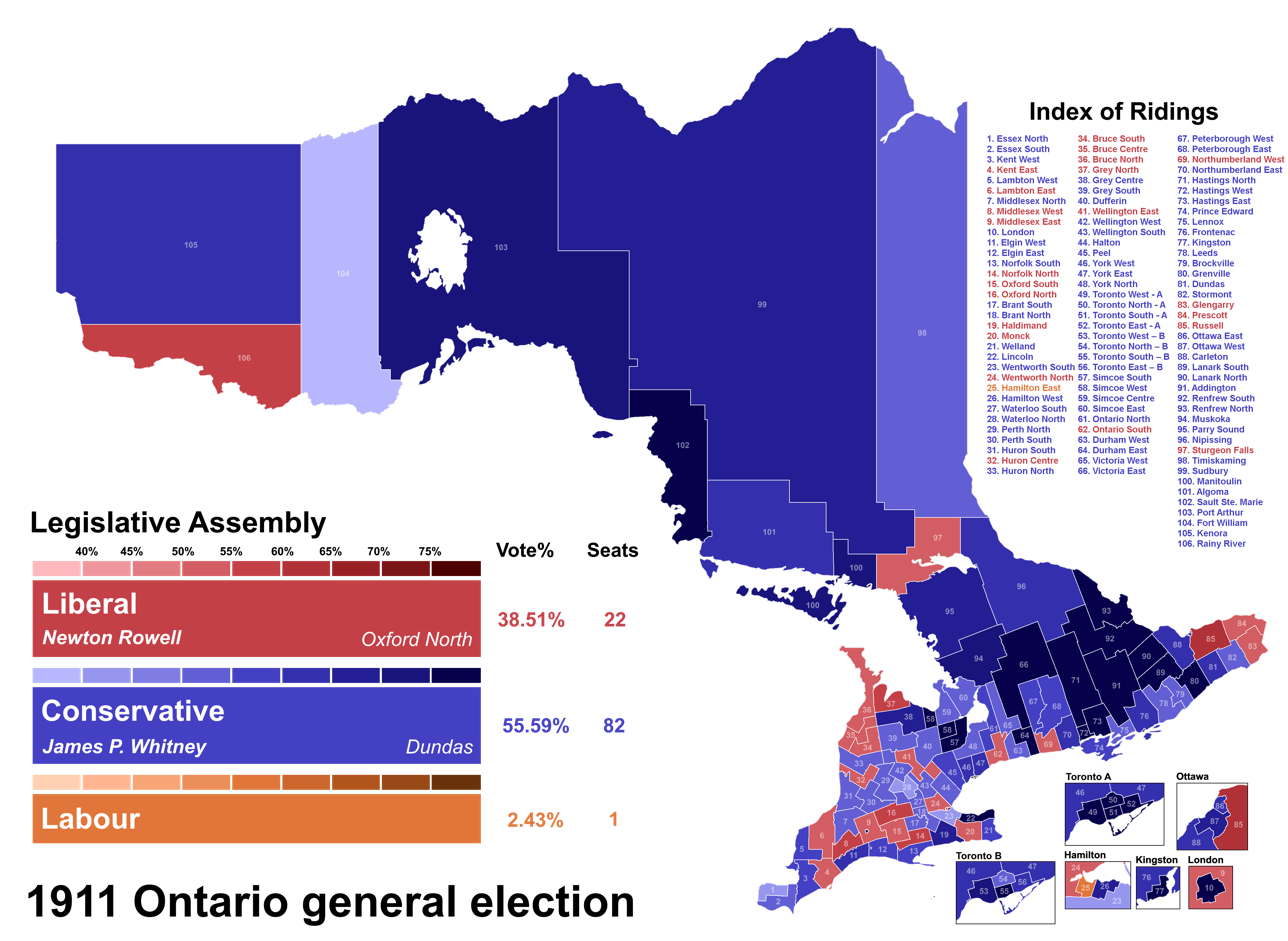
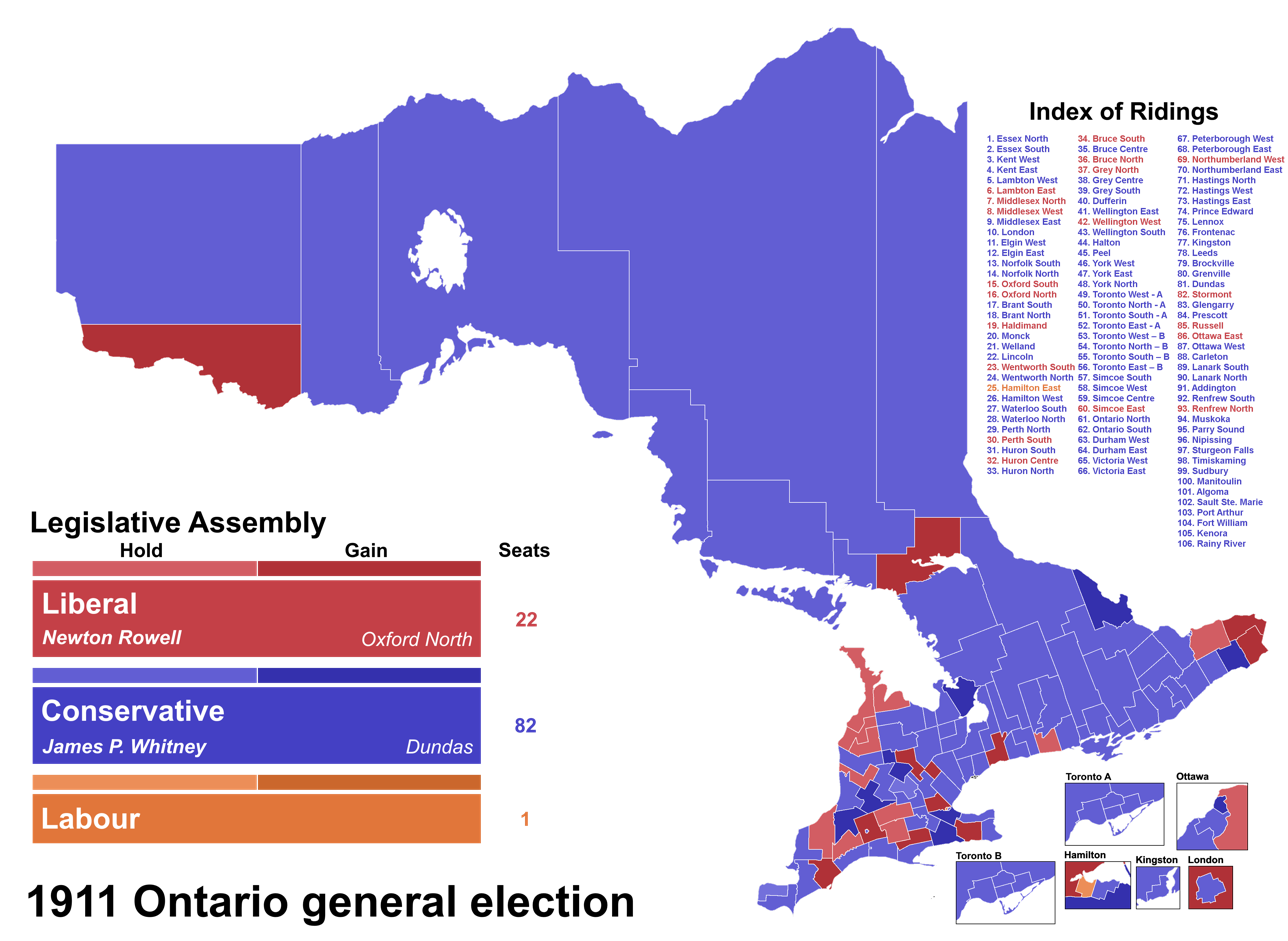
Premier before election
James P. Whitney
Conservative
Premier after election
James P. Whitney
Conservative

The 1911 Ontario general election was the 13th general election held in the province of Ontario, Canada. It was held on December 11, 1911, to elect the 106 Members of the 13th Legislative Assembly of Ontario (titled as Members of the Provincial Parliament or M.P.P.).

The Ontario Conservative Party, led by Sir James P. Whitney, was elected for a third consecutive term in government, with a slight reduced majority in the Legislature.

The Ontario Liberal Party, led by Newton Rowell, added three members to its caucus.

The legislature's sole Labour MLA, Allan Studholme of Hamilton East, retained his seat.

The four Toronto districts each elected two members in this election. Each seat was contested separately, with each voter in the district allowed to vote for a candidate in each contest.

== Results ==
=== Elections overview ===
Political party	Party leader	Before		1911					
Political party	Party leader	1908	Dis.	Can	Seats	±	Votes	%	± (pp)
Conservative	James Whitney	86	87	106	82	4 ▼	205,338	55.59	0.49▲
Liberal-Conservative		-	-	1	1	1 ▲	1,130	0.31	New
Liberal	Newton Rowell	19	18	78	22	3 ▲	142,245	38.51	0.94▼
Labour		1	1	7	1	Steady	8,965	2.43	0.69▲
Independent Conservative		-	-	2	0	-	3,593	0.97	0.39▼
Independent		-	-	5	0	-	3,327	0.90	0.22▲
Socialist		-	-	7	0	-	3,206	0.87	0.23▲
Conservative-Temperance		-	-	1	0	-	1,604	0.43	New
Total		106	106	207	106		369,408	100.00	
Blank and invalid ballots							4,390		
Registered voters / turnout							581,657	64.26	8.42▼

Seats and popular vote by party
Party	Seats	Votes	Change (pp)
Conservative	82 / 106	55.59%	0.49
Liberal	22 / 106	38.51%	-0.94
Other	2 / 106	5.90%	0.45

=== Results of members of 12th Parliament & Resulting composition of the 13th Parliament ===
Party	Members of 12th Parliament				Seats held				Seats gained			Members in 13th Parliament
Party	Total	Stood down	Returned	Defeated	Incumbents		New mem.		Accl.	Open	Ousted incum.	Members in 13th Parliament
Party	Total	Stood down	Returned	Defeated	Won	Accl.	Won	Accl.	Accl.	Open	Ousted incum.	Members in 13th Parliament
Conservative	87	21	58	8	47	11	11	5	1	4	3	82
Lib-Con											1	1
Liberal	18	6	9	3	9		2			4	7	22
Labour	1		1		1							1
Total	106	27	68	11	68		18		20			106

=== Ranking overview ===
Winning Party	Seats Won	Party in 2nd place						Candidates Fielded	Rank			
Winning Party	Seats Won	Accl	Con	Lib	Lab	Soc	Oth	Candidates Fielded	Accl	1st	2nd	3rd
Conservative	82	17		55	4	2	4 (Note: 2 Ind. Conservatives, 1 Independent, Conservative-Temperance)	106	17	65	24	
Lib-Con	1		1					1		1		
Liberal	22		22					78		22	55	1
Labour	1		1					7		1	4	2
Socialist	0							7			2	5
Ind. Conservative	0							2			2	
Independent	0							5			1	4
Conservative-Temperance	0							1			1	
Total	106	17	24	55	4	2	4					

=== Seats that changed hands ===
Party	1908	Gain from (loss to)				1911
Party	1908	Con	Lib	Lab	L-Con	1911
Conservative	86		8 (11)		(1)	82
Liberal	19	11 (8)				22
Labour	1					1
Liberal-Conservative	0	1				1
Total	106	12 (8)	8 (11)	–	(1)	106

Twenty seats changed allegiance from the previous election:

Liberal to Conservative (8)

- Ottawa East
- Renfrew North
- Stormont
- Simcoe East
- Wellington West
- Wentworth South
- Middlesex North (lost in 1909 byelection)
- Perth South

Conservative to Liberal (11)

- Sturgeon Falls
- Glengarry
- Prescott
- Ontario South
- Wellington East
- Wentworth North
- Bruce Centre
- Monck
- Norfolk North
- Middlesex East
- Kent East

Conservative to Liberal-Conservative

- Rainy River

== Local results ==
Incumbent in contest:
retained seat
defeated
retained seat won in byelection
(in preceding parliament)

Open seat:
new candidate retained seat
new candidate failed to retain seat
incumbent from a different electoral
district elected

Misc:
turnout is above provincial average
candidate not an incumbent but a
prevoius member of the legislature

Electoral District (Note: order is as given in EO reports)	Winning party						Turnout	Votes							Region
Electoral District	1908	Party	Votes		Margin		Turnout	Con	Lib	Lab	Soc	Other		Total	Region
Electoral District			#	%	#	%	%						Party		
Addington	Con	Con	acclaimed					accl.							Central (East)
Algoma	Con	Con	1,723	61.87	661	23.73	53.34	1,723	1,062	–	–			2,785	North
Brant North	Con	Con	1,722	52.69	176	5.39	68.81	1,722	1,546	–	–			3,268	W - Grand River
Brant South	Con	Con	3,201	53.19	384	6.38	77.02	3,201	2,817	–	–			6,018	W - Grand River
Brockville	Con	Con	2,090	52.99	449	11.38	73.15	2,090	1,641	–	213			3,944	E - St Lawrence
Bruce Centre	Con	Lib	1,727	51.55	104	3.10	78.92	1,623	1,727	–	–			3,350	W - Midwestern
Bruce North	Lib	Lib	2,182	54.92	391	9.84	72.94	1,791	2,182	–	–			3,973	W - Midwestern
Bruce South	Lib	Lib	1,894	54.38	305	8.76	76.39	1,589	1,894	–	–			3,483	W - Midwestern
Carleton	Con	Con	1,347	60.13	454	20.27	88.24	1,347	893	–	–			2,240	E - Ottawa Valley
Dufferin	Con	Con	1,880	53.96	276	7.92	62.10	1,880	–	–	–	1,604	C-Tmp	3,484	W - Midwestern
Dundas	Con	Con	2,239	62.95	921	25.89	68.32	2,239	1,318	–	–			3,557	E - St Lawrence
Durham East	Con	Con	acclaimed					accl.							Central (East)
Durham West	Con	Con	1,553	53.92	226	7.85	82.49	1,553	1,327	–	–			2,880	Central (East)
Elgin East	Con	Con	2,127	57.91	581	15.82	69.29	2,127	1,546	–	–			3,673	W - Southwest
Elgin West	Con	Con	3,188	62.41	1,268	24.82	59.69	3,188	1,920	–	–			5,108	W - Southwest
Essex North	Con	Con	2,586	42.46	53	0.87	54.46	2,586	972	–	–	2,533	I-Con	6,091	W - Southwest
Essex South	Con	Con	2,665	51.25	130	2.50	74.93	2,665	2,535	–	–			5,200	W - Southwest
Fort William	Con	Con	1,363	43.53	254	8.11	52.04	1,363	1,109	–	–	659	Ind	3,131	North
Frontenac	Con	Con	1,641	61.67	621	23.34	59.29	1,641	1,020	–	–			2,661	Central (East)
Glengarry	Con	Lib	1,988	53.56	264	7.11	67.83	1,724	1,988	–	–			3,712	E - St Lawrence
Grenville	Con	Con	acclaimed					accl.							E - St Lawrence
Grey Centre	Con	Con	2,223	67.90	1,172	35.80	54.31	2,223	1,051	–	–			3,274	W - Midwestern
Grey North	Lib	Lib	3,635	55.67	741	11.35	71.93	2,894	3,635	–	–			6,529	W - Midwestern
Grey South	Con	Con	2,281	54.32	363	8.64	69.96	2,281	1,918	–	–			4,199	W - Midwestern
Haldimand	Lib	Lib	1,924	56.21	425	12.42	78.23	1,499	1,924	–	–			3,423	W - Grand River
Halton	Con	Con	2,385	53.74	332	7.48	70.52	2,385	2,053	–	–			4,438	Central (West)
Hamilton East	Lab	Lab	3,521	55.34	679	10.67	63.65	2,842	–	3,521	–			6,363	Central (West)
Hamilton West	Con	Con	2,594	69.30	1,445	38.61	49.32	2,594	1,149	–	–			3,743	Central (West)
Hastings East	Con	Con	acclaimed					accl.							Central (East)
Hastings North	Con	Con	acclaimed					accl.							Central (East)
Hastings West	Con	Con	acclaimed					accl.							Central (East)
Huron Centre	Lib	Lib	2,148	52.65	216	5.29	77.16	1,932	2,148	–	–			4,080	W - Midwestern
Huron North	Con	Con	2,210	53.21	267	6.43	80.94	2,210	1,943	–	–			4,153	W - Midwestern
Huron South	Con	Con	2,261	53.29	279	6.58	82.70	2,261	1,982	–	–			4,243	W - Midwestern
Kenora	Con	Con	1,179	61.66	446	23.33	46.40	1,179	733	–	–			1,912	North
Kent East	Con	Lib	2,452	52.26	212	4.52	70.47	2,240	2,452	–	–			4,692	W - Southwest
Kent West	Con	Con	3,106	58.11	867	16.22	55.76	3,106	–	–	–	2,239	Ind	5,345	W - Southwest
Kingston	Con	Con	acclaimed					accl.							E - St Lawrence
Lambton East	Lib	Lib	2,170	51.05	89	2.09	78.10	2,081	2,170	–	–			4,251	W - Southwest
Lambton West	Con	Con	3,969	57.71	1,061	15.43	67.85	3,969	2,908	–	–			6,877	W - Southwest
Lanark North	Con	Con	acclaimed					accl.							E - Ottawa Valley
Lanark South	Con	Con	acclaimed					accl.							E - Ottawa Valley
Leeds	Con	Con	1,995	52.12	162	4.23	72.24	1,995	1,833	–	–			3,828	E - St Lawrence
Lennox	Con	Con	1,450	51.40	79	2.80	76.66	1,450	1,371	–	–			2,821	Central (East)
Lincoln	Con	Con	acclaimed					accl.							W - Grand River
London	Con	Con	acclaimed					accl.							W - Southwest
Manitoulin	Con	Con	1,254	74.69	829	49.37	38.85	1,254	425	–	–			1,679	North
Middlesex East	Con	Lib	2,039	50.31	25	0.62	69.27	2,014	2,039	–	–			4,053	W - Southwest
Middlesex North	Lib	Con	1,991	50.44	35	0.89	75.39	1,991	1,956	–	–			3,947	W - Southwest
Middlesex West	Lib	Lib	1,767	59.86	582	19.72	73.09	1,185	1,767	–	–			2,952	W - Southwest
Monck	Con	Lib	1,875	52.14	154	4.28	75.87	1,721	1,875	–	–			3,596	W - Grand River
Muskoka	Con	Con	1,970	77.87	1,410	55.73	45.71	1,970	560	–	–			2,530	Central (North)
Nipissing	Con	Con	1,800	64.47	808	28.94	50.17	1,800	992	–	–			2,792	North
Norfolk North	Con	Lib	1,740	55.20	328	10.41	74.56	1,412	1,740	–	–			3,152	W - Midwestern
Norfolk South	Con	Con	1,423	56.99	377	15.10	66.99	1,423	1,046	–	28			2,497	W - Midwestern
Northumberland East	Con	Con	2,311	64.21	1,023	28.42	61.80	2,311	1,288	–	–			3,599	Central (East)
Northumberland West	Lib	Lib	1,615	53.89	233	7.77	79.75	1,382	1,615	–	–			2,997	Central (East)
Ontario North	Con	Con	1,971	57.21	497	14.43	73.77	1,971	1,474	–	–			3,445	Cen (Ont-York)
Ontario South	Con	Lib	2,577	52.52	247	5.03	73.50	2,330	2,577	–	–			4,907	Cen (Ont-York)
Ottawa East	Lib	Con	2,842	64.46	1,275	28.92	60.57	2,842	1,567	–	–			4,409	E - Ottawa Valley
Ottawa West	Con	Con	4,398	65.70	2,102	31.40	48.42	4,398	2,296	–	–			6,694	E - Ottawa Valley
Oxford North	Lib	Lib	2,651	55.90	560	11.81	68.09	2,091	2,651	–	–			4,742	W - Southwest
Oxford South	Lib	Lib	2,457	52.15	203	4.31	73.24	2,254	2,457	–	–			4,711	W - Southwest
Parry Sound	Con	Con	2,218	65.99	1,075	31.98	35.75	2,218	1,143	–	–			3,361	Central (North)
Peel	Con	Con	2,705	57.63	716	15.25	70.55	2,705	1,989	–	–			4,694	Central (West)
Perth North	Con	Con	3,523	52.79	372	5.57	77.13	3,523	3,151	–	–			6,674	W - Midwestern
Perth South	Lib	Con	2,388	50.78	73	1.55	80.47	2,388	2,315	–	–			4,703	W - Midwestern
Peterborough East	Con	Con	1,579	56.90	503	18.13	61.98	1,579	1,076	–	–	120	Ind	2,775	Central (East)
Peterborough West	Con	Con	2,674	56.53	618	13.07	62.49	2,674	2,056	–	–			4,730	Central (East)
Port Arthur	Con	Con	1,515	72.56	942	45.11	42.79	1,515	–	–	573			2,088	North
Prescott	Con	Lib	1,976	53.87	284	7.74	59.84	1,692	1,976	–	–			3,668	E - Ottawa Valley
Prince Edward	Con	Con	2,286	57.37	587	14.73	75.92	2,286	1,699	–	–			3,985	Central (East)
Rainy River	Con	L-Con	1,130	57.24	286	14.49	54.14	844	–	–	–	1,130	LCon	1,974	North
Renfrew North	Lib	Con	acclaimed					accl.							E - Ottawa Valley
Renfrew South	Con	Con	acclaimed					accl.							E - Ottawa Valley
Russell	Lib	Lib	3,041	64.16	1,342	28.31	54.74	1,699	3,041	–	–			4,740	E - Ottawa Valley
Sault Ste. Marie	Con	Con	acclaimed					accl.							North
Simcoe Centre	Con	Con	1,791	51.36	95	2.72	66.18	1,791	1,696	–	–			3,487	Central (North)
Simcoe East	Lib	Con	3,103	52.80	329	5.60	65.37	3,103	2,774	–	–			5,877	Central (North)
Simcoe South	Con	Con	acclaimed					accl.							Central (North)
Simcoe West	Con	Con	acclaimed					accl.							Central (North)
Stormont	Lib	Con	2,249	52.63	225	5.27	63.45	2,249	2,024	–	–			4,273	E - St Lawrence
Sturgeon Falls	Con	Lib	885	54.53	147	9.06	66.44	738	885	–	–			1,623	North
Sudbury	Con	Con	2,541	68.90	1,394	37.80	29.16	2,541	–	–	1,147			3,688	North
Timiskaming	Con	Con	2,403	52.91	264	5.81	40.68	2,403	2,139	–	–			4,542	North
Toronto East - A	Con	Con	3,299	78.16	2,239	53.04	32.07	3,299	–	922	–			4,221	Cen (Ont-York)
Toronto East – B	Con	Con	2,767	63.77	1,707	39.34	33.27	2,767	–	512	–	1,060	I-Con	4,339	Cen (Ont-York)
Toronto North - A	Con	Con	5,165	79.73	2,049	31.63	44.92	5,165	–	1,313	–			6,478	Cen (Ont-York)
Toronto North – B	Con	Con	3,824	53.72	708	9.95	49.36	3,824	3,116	178	–			7,118	Cen (Ont-York)
Toronto South - A	Con	Con	2,594	77.11	1,824	54.22	29.34	2,594	–	770	–			3,364	Cen (Ont-York)
Toronto South – B	Con	Con	2,647	78.87	1,877	55.93	29.27	2,647	709	–	–			3,356	Cen (Ont-York)
Toronto West - A	Con	Con	5,469	75.93	3,720	51.65	30.56	5,469	1,519	–	–	215	Ind	7,203	Cen (Ont-York)
Toronto West – B	Con	Con	5,225	74.92	3,476	49.84	29.59	5,225	–	1,749	–			6,974	Cen (Ont-York)
Victoria East	Con	Con	acclaimed					accl.							Central (North)
Victoria West	Con	Con	1,836	50.14	104	2.84	68.21	1,836	1,732	–	–	94	Ind	3,662	Central (North)
Waterloo North	Con	Con	3,059	47.95	193	3.03	69.51	3,059	2,866	–	454			6,379	W - Grand River
Waterloo South	Con	Con	2,770	54.05	997	19.45	59.48	2,770	1,773	–	582			5,125	W - Grand River
Welland	Con	Con	3,511	56.47	805	12.95	61.62	3,511	2,706	–	–			6,217	W - Grand River
Wellington East	Con	Lib	1,932	54.78	337	9.55	72.46	1,595	1,932	–	–			3,527	W - Grand River
Wellington South	Con	Con	2,912	54.19	450	8.37	72.76	2,912	2,462	–	–			5,374	W - Grand River
Wellington West	Lib	Con	1,778	51.82	125	3.64	77.44	1,778	1,653	–	–			3,431	W - Grand River
Wentworth North	Con	Lib	1,723	50.42	29	0.85	81.92	1,694	1,723	–	–			3,417	Central (West)
Wentworth South	Lib	Con	1,496	48.32	105	3.39	49.75	1,496	1,391	–	209			3,096	Central (West)
York East	Con	Con	2,337	60.05	782	20.09	36.56	2,337	1,555	–	–			3,892	Cen (Ont-York)
York North	Con	Con	3,023	54.44	493	8.88	84.46	3,023	2,530	–	–			5,553	Cen (Ont-York)
York West	Con	Con	2,847	65.16	1,325	30.33	39.79	2,847	1,522	–	–			4,369	Cen (Ont-York)

=== Members elected by region and electoral district ===
Conservative Liberal Labour
Italicized names indicate members returned by acclamation.

Southwestern Ontario
Elgin East: Charles Andrew Brower
Elgin West: Findlay George MacDiarmid
Essex North: Joseph Octave Reaume
Essex South: Charles N. Anderson
Kent East: Walter Renwick Ferguson
Kent West: George William Sulman
Lambton East: Robert John McCormick
Lambton West: William John Hanna
London: Adam Beck
Middlesex East: Robert Sutherland
Middlesex North: Duncan MacArthur
Middlesex West: John Campbell Elliott
Oxford North: Newton Wesley Rowell
Oxford South: Thomas Richard Mayberry

Midwestern Ontario

Bruce Centre: William MacDonald
Bruce North: Charles Martin Bowman
Bruce South: John Anderson
Dufferin: Charles Robert McKeown
Grey Centre: Isaac Benson Lucas
Grey North: Alexander Grant MacKay
Grey South: David Jamieson
Huron Centre: William Proudfoot
Huron North: Armstrong Musgrove
Huron South: Henry Eilber
Norfolk North: Thomas Robert Atkinson
Norfolk South: Arthur Clarence Pratt
Perth North: James Torrance
Perth South: John Benneweis

Grand River

Brant: John Wesley Westbrook
Brant South: Willoughby Staples Brewster
Haldimand: Christian Kohler
Lincoln: Elisha Jessop
Monck: Thomas A. Marshall
Waterloo North: Henry George Lackner
Waterloo South: George Pattinson
Wellington East: Udney Richardson
Wellington South: Henry Scholfield
Wellington West: William Clarke Chambers
Welland: Evan Eugene Fraser

Northern Ontario
Algoma: Albert Grigg
Fort William: Charles William Jarvis
Kenora: Harold Arthur Clement Machin
Manitoulin: Robert Roswell Gamey
Nipissing: Henri Morel
Port Arthur: Donald McDonald Hogarth
Rainy River: James Arthur Mathieu (Lib-Con)
Sault Ste. Marie: William Howard Hearst
Sturgeon Falls: Zotique Mageau
Sudbury: Charles McCrea
Timiskaming: Robert Taylor Shillington

Central Ontario (North)

Muskoka: Arthur Arnold Mahaffy
Parry Sound: John Galna
Simcoe Centre: Alfred Burke Thompson
Simcoe East: James Irwin Hartt
Simcoe South: Alexander Ferguson
Simcoe West: James Stoddart Duff
Victoria East: Robert Mercer Mason
Victoria West: Adam Edward Vrooman

Central Ontario (West)

Halton: Alfred Westland Nixon
Hamilton East: Allan Studholme
Hamilton West: John Strathearn Hendrie
Peel: Samuel Charters
Wentworth North: James McQueen
Wentworth South: James Thomas Hammill Regan

Ontario/York/Toronto

Ontario North: William Henry Hoyle
Ontario South: William Edmund Newton Sinclair
York East: Alexander McCowan
York North: Thomas Herbert Lennox
York West: Forbes Godfrey
Toronto East - A: Robert Allan Pyne
Toronto East - B: Thomas Richard Whitesides
Toronto North - A: William Kirkpatrick McNaught
Toronto North - B: James Joseph Foy
Toronto South - A: Edward William James Owens
Toronto South - B: George Horace Gooderham
Toronto West - A: Thomas Crawford
Toronto West - B: William David McPherson

Ottawa Valley
Carleton: Robert Herbert McElroy
Lanark North: Richard Franklin Preston
Lanark South: Arthur James Matheson
Ottawa East: Napoléon Champagne
Ottawa West: James Albert Ellis
Renfrew North: Edward Arunah Dunlop
Renfrew South: Thomas William McGarry
Russell: Damase Racine
Prescott: Gustave Évanturel

Saint Lawrence Valley

Brockville: Albert Edward Donovan
Dundas: James Pliny Whitney
Glengarry: Hugh Munro
Grenville: George Howard Ferguson
Kingston: Arthur Edward Ross
Leeds: John Robertson Dargavel
Stormont: John Colborne Milligan

Central Ontario (East)

Addington: William David Black
Durham East: Josiah Johnston Preston
Durham West: John Henry Devitt
Frontenac: Anthony McGuin Rankin
Hastings East: Sandy Grant
Hastings North: John Robert Cooke
Hastings West: John Wesley Johnson
Lennox: Thomas George Carscallen
Northumberland East: Samuel Greerson Nesbitt
Northumberland West: Samuel Clarke
Peterborough East: James Thompson
Peterborough West: Edward Armour Peck
Prince Edward: Robert Addison Norman

== See also ==
- Politics of Ontario
- List of Ontario political parties
- Premier of Ontario
- Leader of the Opposition (Ontario)
