= 1908 Ontario general election =

Canadian provincial election

- June 8, 1908

106 seats in the 12th Legislative Assembly of Ontario 54 seats were needed for a majority
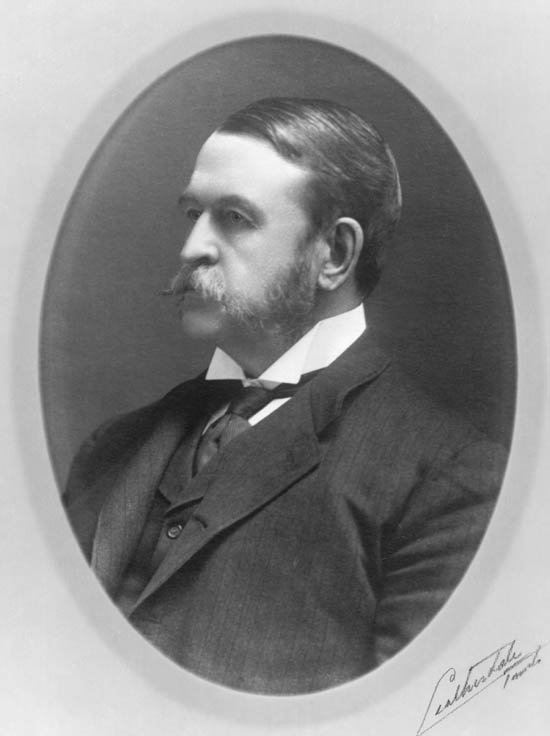

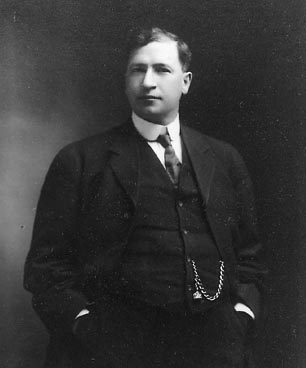
| | First party | Second party |
|---|---|---|
| Leader | James P. Whitney | Alexander Grant MacKay |
| Party | Conservative | Liberal |
| Leader since | 1896 | 1907 |
| Leader's seat | Dundas | Grey North |
| Last election | 69 | 28 |
| Seats won | 86 | 19 |
| Seat change | ▲17 | ▼9 |
| Popular vote | 246,324 | 177,719 |
| Percentage | 54.68% | 39.45% |
| Swing | ▲1.31 pp | ▼5.16 pp |
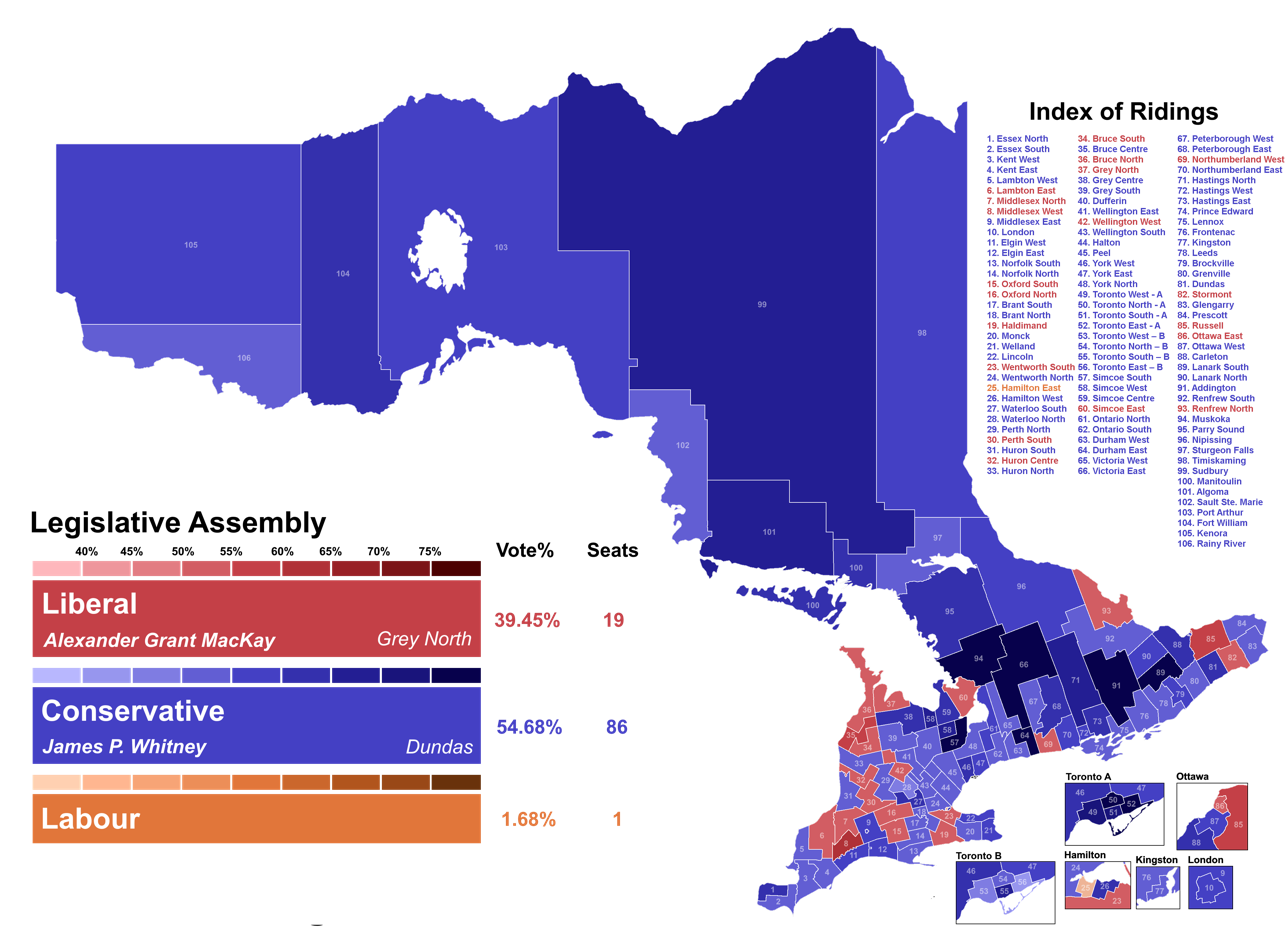
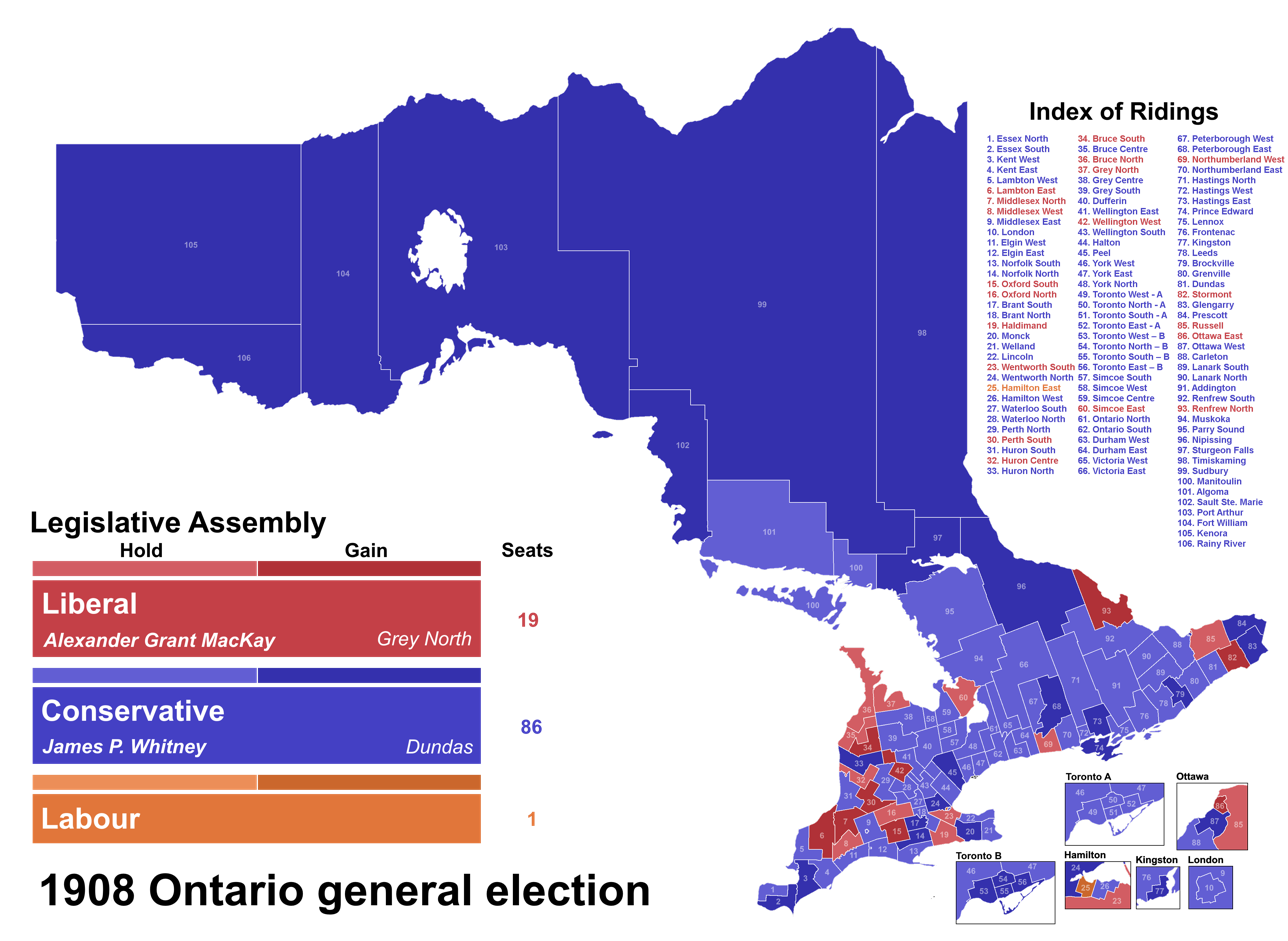
Premier before election
James P. Whitney
Conservative
Premier after election
James P. Whitney
Conservative

The 1908 Ontario general election was the 12th general election held in the province of Ontario, Canada. It was held on June 8, 1908, to elect the 106 Members of the 12th Legislative Assembly of Ontario ("MLAs").

The Ontario Conservative Party, led by Sir James P. Whitney, was elected for a second term in government, increasing its majority in the Legislature significantly.

The Ontario Liberal Party, led by Alexander Grant MacKay, continued to lose seats.

Allan Studholme became the province's first Labour MLA as the result of a 1906 Hamilton East by-election. He was re-elected in the 1908 general election and would remain in the legislature until his death in 1919.

The four Toronto districts each elected two members in this election. Each seat was contested separately, with each voter in the district allowed to vote for a candidate in each contest.

== Expansion of the Legislative Assembly ==
The number of electoral districts was increased from 97 to 102, under an Act passed in 1902, returning a total of 106 MLAs. The following electoral changes were made:

- Fort William and Lake of the Woods was split into Fort William and Kenora
- Port Arthur and Rainy River was split into Port Arthur and Rainy River
- Nipissing East was divided into Nipissing and Timiskaming
- Nipissing West was divided into Sudbury and Sturgeon Falls
- Cardwell was renamed Simcoe South, after the transfer of Albion and Bolton to Peel
- The three ridings of Huron County were reorganized:

- Huron South gained from Huron West the remainder of the Township of Goderich not previously included in it, in exchange for Seaforth
- Huron East and Huron West were reorganized into Huron North and Huron Centre respectively

- Ottawa was divided into Ottawa East and Ottawa West
- Toronto East, Toronto North, Toronto South and Toronto West now returned two MLAs each, elected separately in seats labelled A and B in each district.

== Electoral system ==
The eight Toronto MPPs were elected in two-seat districts, with each seat determined by a separate First-past-the-post voting contest.

The other 94 MPPs were elected through First-past-the-post voting in single-member districts.

== Results ==
Elections to the 12th Parliament of Ontario (1908)
| Political party | Party leader | MLAs | | | | Votes | | | |
| Political party | Party leader | Candidates | 1905 | 1908 | ± | # | ± | % | ± (pp) |
|---|---|---|---|---|---|---|---|---|---|
| Conservative | James P. Whitney | 105 | 69 | 86 | 17▲ | 246,324 | 8,712▲ | 54.68% | 1.31▲ |
| Liberal | Alexander Grant MacKay | 90 | 28 | 19 | 9▼ | 177,719 | 20,876▼ | 39.45% | 5.16▼ |
| Labour | | 8 | – | 1 | 1▲ | 7,555 | 7,555▲ | 1.68% | New |
| Independent Liberal | | 2 | 1 | – | 1▼ | 1,470 | 3,892▼ | 0.33% | 0.87▼ |
| Independent Conservative | | 6 | – | – | – | 7,977 | 7,882▲ | 1.77% | 1.75▲ |
| Socialist | | 13 | – | – | – | 3,129 | 1,856▲ | 0.69% | 0.40▲ |
| Independent | | 6 | – | – | – | 3,091 | 2,991▲ | 0.69% | 0.67▲ |
| Prohibitionist | | 1 | – | – | – | 2,187 | 281▲ | 0.49% | 0.06▲ |
| Liberal-Temperance | | 1 | – | – | – | 1,017 | 1,017▲ | 0.23% | New |
| Total | | 232 | 98 | 106 | | 450,469 | | 100.00% | |
| Voter turnout | | | | | | 457,209 | 10,006▲ | 73.42 | 0.54▼ |
| Registered electors | | | | | | 622,751 | 18,085▲ | | |
| Acclamations | | █ Conservative | | 6 | | | | | |

Seats and popular vote by party
| Party | Seats | Votes | Change (pp) |
|---|---|---|---|
| Conservative | 86 / 106 | 54.68% | 1.31 |
| Liberal | 19 / 106 | 39.45% | -5.16 |
| Labour | 1 / 106 | 1.68% | 1.68 |
| Other | 0 / 106 | 4.19% | 2.17 |

=== Synopsis of results ===
Results by riding - 1908 Ontario general election
| Riding | Winning party | | | | | | Turnout | Votes | | | | | | | | | |
| Name (Note: order is as given in EO reports) | 1905 | Party | Votes | Share | Margin # | Margin % | Turnout | Con | Lib | Lab | I-Con | I-Lib | Soc | Proh | L-Tmp | Ind | Total |
|---|---|---|---|---|---|---|---|---|---|---|---|---|---|---|---|---|---|
| Addington | Con | Con | acclaimed | | | | | | | | | | | | | | |
| Algoma | Con | Con | 2,134 | 60.95% | 767 | 21.91% | 80.70% | 2,134 | 1,367 | – | – | – | – | – | – | – | 3,501 |
| Brant North | Con | Con | 1,850 | 54.69% | 317 | 9.37% | 89.15% | 1,850 | 1,533 | – | – | – | – | – | – | – | 3,383 |
| Brant South | Lib | Con | 2,815 | 51.83% | 199 | 3.66% | 86.91% | 2,815 | 2,616 | – | – | – | – | – | – | – | 5,431 |
| Brockville | Lib | Con | 2,195 | 56.59% | 511 | 13.17% | 85.09% | 2,195 | 1,684 | – | – | – | – | – | – | – | 3,879 |
| Bruce Centre | Con | Con | 1,940 | 55.05% | 356 | 10.10% | 88.48% | 1,940 | 1,584 | – | – | – | – | – | – | – | 3,524 |
| Bruce North | Lib | Lib | 2,282 | 53.99% | 337 | 7.97% | 80.85% | 1,945 | 2,282 | – | – | – | – | – | – | – | 4,227 |
| Bruce South | Con | Lib | 1,774 | 51.39% | 96 | 2.78% | 86.02% | 1,678 | 1,774 | – | – | – | – | – | – | – | 3,452 |
| Carleton | Con | Con | 1,352 | 62.22% | 531 | 24.44% | 51.67% | 1,352 | 821 | – | – | – | – | – | – | – | 2,173 |
| Dufferin | Con | Con | 2,229 | 50.48% | 42 | 0.95% | 84.37% | 2,229 | – | – | – | – | – | 2,187 | – | – | 4,416 |
| Dundas | Con | Con | 2,260 | 62.67% | 914 | 25.35% | 75.78% | 2,260 | 1,346 | – | – | – | – | – | – | – | 3,606 |
| Durham East | Con | Con | acclaimed | | | | | | | | | | | | | | |
| Durham West | Con | Con | 1,575 | 51.04% | 64 | 2.07% | 85.30% | 1,575 | 1,511 | – | – | – | – | – | – | – | 3,086 |
| Elgin East | Con | Con | 2,289 | 56.09% | 497 | 12.18% | 86.70% | 2,289 | 1,792 | – | – | – | – | – | – | – | 4,081 |
| Elgin West | Con | Con | 3,347 | 55.00% | 609 | 10.01% | 76.88% | 3,347 | 2,738 | – | – | – | – | – | – | – | 6,085 |
| Essex North | Con | Con | 2,988 | 63.63% | 1,280 | 27.26% | 51.74% | 2,988 | 1,708 | – | – | – | – | – | – | – | 4,696 |
| Essex South | Lib | Con | 2,618 | 50.76% | 78 | 1.51% | 83.62% | 2,618 | 2,540 | – | – | – | – | – | – | – | 5,158 |
| Fort William | New | Con | 1,317 | 61.06% | 477 | 22.11% | 67.38% | 1,317 | 840 | – | – | – | – | – | – | – | 2,157 |
| Frontenac | Con | Con | 1,576 | 53.05% | 181 | 6.09% | 67.46% | 1,576 | 1,395 | – | – | – | – | – | – | – | 2,971 |
| Glengarry | Lib | Con | 2,170 | 53.07% | 251 | 6.14% | 77.41% | 2,170 | 1,919 | – | – | – | – | – | – | – | 4,089 |
| Grenville | Con | Con | 1,923 | 50.30% | 23 | 0.60% | 75.72% | 1,923 | – | – | 1,900 | – | – | – | – | – | 3,823 |
| Grey Centre | Con | Con | 2,253 | 64.54% | 1,015 | 29.07% | 62.54% | 2,253 | 1,238 | – | – | – | – | – | – | – | 3,491 |
| Grey North | Lib | Lib | 3,026 | 50.59% | 71 | 1.19% | 70.93% | 2,955 | 3,026 | – | – | – | – | – | – | – | 5,981 |
| Grey South | Con | Con | 2,187 | 53.04% | 251 | 6.09% | 73.16% | 2,187 | 1,936 | – | – | – | – | – | – | – | 4,123 |
| Haldimand | Lib | Lib | 1,977 | 54.81% | 347 | 9.62% | 96.22% | 1,630 | 1,977 | – | – | – | – | – | – | – | 3,607 |
| Halton | Con | Con | 2,449 | 53.86% | 351 | 7.72% | 86.86% | 2,449 | 2,098 | – | – | – | – | – | – | – | 4,547 |
| Hamilton East | Con | Lab | 2,717 | 40.91% | 75 | 1.13% | 72.45% | 2,642 | 1,258 | 2,717 | – | – | – | – | – | 24 | 6,641 |
| Hamilton West | Con | Con | 3,121 | 63.22% | 1,558 | 31.56% | 69.65% | 3,121 | 1,563 | – | – | – | – | – | – | 253 | 4,937 |
| Hastings East | I-Lib | Con | 2,201 | 61.76% | 838 | 23.51% | 75.90% | 2,201 | 1,363 | – | – | – | – | – | – | – | 3,564 |
| Hastings North | Con | Con | 2,225 | 65.42% | 1,049 | 30.84% | 64.19% | 2,225 | – | – | 1,176 | – | – | – | – | – | 3,401 |
| Hastings West | Con | Con | 1,882 | 52.41% | 173 | 4.82% | 81.15% | 1,882 | 1,709 | – | – | – | – | – | – | – | 3,591 |
| Huron Centre | Lib | Lib | 2,051 | 52.11% | 166 | 4.22% | 78.68% | 1,885 | 2,051 | – | – | – | – | – | – | – | 3,936 |
| Huron North | Lib | Con | 2,292 | 51.94% | 171 | 3.87% | 93.11% | 2,292 | 2,121 | – | – | – | – | – | – | – | 4,413 |
| Huron South | Con | Con | 2,365 | 54.41% | 383 | 8.81% | 89.97% | 2,365 | 1,982 | – | – | – | – | – | – | – | 4,347 |
| Kenora | New | Con | 1,078 | 56.00% | 231 | 12.00% | 41.23% | 1,078 | 847 | – | – | – | – | – | – | – | 1,925 |
| Kent East | Con | Con | 2,524 | 50.83% | 82 | 1.65% | 78.54% | 2,524 | 2,442 | – | – | – | – | – | – | – | 4,966 |
| Kent West | Lib | Con | 3,926 | 52.98% | 441 | 5.95% | 83.47% | 3,926 | 3,485 | – | – | – | – | – | – | – | 7,411 |
| Kingston | Lib | Con | 2,215 | 54.48% | 393 | 9.67% | 96.27% | 2,215 | 1,822 | 29 | – | – | – | – | – | – | 4,066 |
| Lambton East | Con | Lib | 2,404 | 52.57% | 235 | 5.14% | 93.46% | 2,169 | 2,404 | – | – | – | – | – | – | – | 4,573 |
| Lambton West | Con | Con | 3,841 | 54.45% | 628 | 8.90% | 79.98% | 3,841 | 3,213 | – | – | – | – | – | – | – | 7,054 |
| Lanark North | Con | Con | 2,017 | 56.61% | 471 | 13.22% | 90.11% | 2,017 | 1,546 | – | – | – | – | – | – | – | 3,563 |
| Lanark South | Con | Con | acclaimed | | | | | | | | | | | | | | |
| Leeds | Con | Con | 2,102 | 52.35% | 189 | 4.71% | 89.98% | 2,102 | 1,913 | – | – | – | – | – | – | – | 4,015 |
| Lennox | Con | Con | 1,477 | 50.29% | 17 | 0.58% | 89.40% | 1,477 | 1,460 | – | – | – | – | – | – | – | 2,937 |
| Lincoln | Con | Con | 3,463 | 59.56% | 1,112 | 19.13% | 78.67% | 3,463 | 2,351 | – | – | – | – | – | – | – | 5,814 |
| London | Con | Con | 5,084 | 58.00% | 1,403 | 16.01% | 78.42% | 5,084 | 3,681 | – | – | – | – | – | – | – | 8,765 |
| Manitoulin | Con | Con | 1,414 | 66.73% | 709 | 33.46% | 58.48% | 1,414 | 705 | – | – | – | – | – | – | – | 2,119 |
| Middlesex East | Con | Con | 2,363 | 56.44% | 539 | 12.87% | 79.28% | 2,363 | 1,824 | – | – | – | – | – | – | – | 4,187 |
| Middlesex North | Con | Lib | 2,172 | 51.29% | 109 | 2.57% | 91.10% | 2,063 | 2,172 | – | – | – | – | – | – | – | 4,235 |
| Middlesex West | Lib | Lib | 1,775 | 60.29% | 606 | 20.58% | 82.91% | – | 1,775 | – | – | 1,169 | – | – | – | – | 2,944 |
| Monck | Lib | Con | 1,816 | 50.49% | 35 | 0.97% | 90.23% | 1,816 | 1,781 | – | – | – | – | – | – | – | 3,597 |
| Muskoka | Con | Con | acclaimed | | | | | | | | | | | | | | |
| Nipissing | New | Con | 1,654 | 59.09% | 509 | 18.19% | 67.63% | 1,654 | 1,145 | – | – | – | – | – | – | – | 2,799 |
| Norfolk North | Lib | Con | 1,720 | 51.08% | 73 | 2.17% | 94.01% | 1,720 | 1,647 | – | – | – | – | – | – | – | 3,367 |
| Norfolk South | Con | Con | 1,490 | 52.04% | 117 | 4.09% | 92.48% | 1,490 | 1,373 | – | – | – | – | – | – | – | 2,863 |
| Northumberland East | Con | Con | 2,582 | 56.30% | 578 | 12.60% | 82.12% | 2,582 | 2,004 | – | – | – | – | – | – | – | 4,586 |
| Northumberland West | Lib | Lib | 1,591 | 53.44% | 205 | 6.89% | 92.38% | 1,386 | 1,591 | – | – | – | – | – | – | – | 2,977 |
| Ontario North | Con | Con | 2,230 | 55.62% | 451 | 11.25% | 85.39% | 2,230 | 1,779 | – | – | – | – | – | – | – | 4,009 |
| Ontario South | Con | Con | 2,773 | 52.90% | 304 | 5.80% | 85.46% | 2,773 | 2,469 | – | – | – | – | – | – | – | 5,242 |
| Ottawa East | New | Lib | 2,798 | 54.54% | 466 | 9.08% | 78.11% | 2,332 | 2,798 | – | – | – | – | – | – | – | 5,130 |
| Ottawa West | New | Con | 4,806 | 55.04% | 880 | 10.08% | 71.86% | 4,806 | 3,926 | – | – | – | – | – | – | – | 8,732 |
| Oxford North | Lib | Lib | 2,893 | 54.03% | 432 | 8.07% | 81.25% | 2,461 | 2,893 | – | – | – | – | – | – | – | 5,354 |
| Oxford South | Con | Lib | 2,671 | 50.42% | 44 | 0.83% | 88.55% | 2,627 | 2,671 | – | – | – | – | – | – | – | 5,298 |
| Parry Sound | Con | Con | 2,879 | 62.05% | 1,263 | 27.22% | 53.88% | 2,879 | 1,616 | – | – | – | – | – | – | 145 | 4,640 |
| Peel | Lib | Con | 2,852 | 54.78% | 498 | 9.57% | 87.79% | 2,852 | 2,354 | – | – | – | – | – | – | – | 5,206 |
| Perth North | Con | Con | 3,688 | 51.87% | 266 | 3.74% | 88.65% | 3,688 | 3,422 | – | – | – | – | – | – | – | 7,110 |
| Perth South | Con | Lib | 2,453 | 50.58% | 56 | 1.15% | 93.18% | 2,397 | 2,453 | – | – | – | – | – | – | – | 4,850 |
| Peterborough East | Lib | Con | 1,978 | 61.14% | 721 | 22.29% | 78.99% | 1,978 | 1,257 | – | – | – | – | – | – | – | 3,235 |
| Peterborough West | Con | Con | 2,561 | 54.56% | 428 | 9.12% | 76.14% | 2,561 | 2,133 | – | – | – | – | – | – | – | 4,694 |
| Port Arthur | New | Con | 1,241 | 55.16% | 380 | 16.89% | 71.64% | 1,241 | – | – | 861 | – | 148 | – | – | – | 2,250 |
| Prescott | Lib | Con | 1,944 | 50.09% | 7 | 0.18% | 66.02% | 1,944 | 1,937 | – | – | – | – | – | – | – | 3,881 |
| Prince Edward | Lib | Con | 2,221 | 51.53% | 132 | 3.06% | 86.70% | 2,221 | – | – | 2,089 | – | – | – | – | – | 4,310 |
| Rainy River | New | Con | 944 | 54.95% | 170 | 9.90% | 78.65% | 944 | 774 | – | – | – | – | – | – | – | 1,718 |
| Renfrew North | Con | Lib | 2,274 | 52.28% | 198 | 4.55% | 86.47% | 2,076 | 2,274 | – | – | – | – | – | – | – | 4,350 |
| Renfrew South | Con | Con | 2,623 | 52.39% | 239 | 4.77% | 77.82% | 2,623 | 2,384 | – | – | – | – | – | – | – | 5,007 |
| Russell | Lib | Lib | 2,642 | 58.72% | 785 | 17.45% | 59.61% | 1,857 | 2,642 | – | – | – | – | – | – | – | 4,499 |
| Sault Ste. Marie | Lib | Con | 1,406 | 54.69% | 241 | 9.37% | 61.43% | 1,406 | 1,165 | – | – | – | – | – | – | – | 2,571 |
| Simcoe Centre | Con | Con | 1,972 | 55.08% | 364 | 10.17% | 75.97% | 1,972 | 1,608 | – | – | – | – | – | – | – | 3,580 |
| Simcoe East | Lib | Lib | 3,105 | 51.49% | 180 | 2.99% | 75.37% | 2,925 | 3,105 | – | – | – | – | – | – | – | 6,030 |
| Simcoe South | Con | Con | acclaimed | | | | | | | | | | | | | | |
| Simcoe West | Con | Con | 1,921 | 65.38% | 904 | 30.77% | 61.18% | 1,921 | – | – | – | – | – | – | 1,017 | – | 2,938 |
| Stormont | Con | Lib | 2,327 | 50.09% | 8 | 0.17% | 70.96% | 2,319 | 2,327 | – | – | – | – | – | – | – | 4,646 |
| Sturgeon Falls | New | Con | 959 | 52.92% | 106 | 5.85% | 82.42% | 959 | 853 | – | – | – | – | – | – | – | 1,812 |
| Sudbury | New | Con | 1,492 | 62.69% | 604 | 25.38% | 64.29% | 1,492 | 888 | – | – | – | – | – | – | – | 2,380 |
| Timiskaming | New | Con | 1,649 | 55.00% | 549 | 18.31% | 48.21% | 1,649 | 1,100 | – | – | – | 249 | – | – | – | 2,998 |
| Toronto East - A | Con | Con | 4,393 | 76.51% | 1,988 | 34.62% | 48.59% | 4,393 | – | 1,003 | – | – | 346 | – | – | – | 5,742 |
| Toronto East – B | New | Con | 2,695 | 43.03% | 290 | 4.63% | 53.00% | 2,695 | 975 | – | – | – | 188 | – | – | 2,405 | 6,263 |
| Toronto North - A | Con | Con | 6,789 | 88.44% | 2,919 | 38.03% | 53.92% | 6,789 | – | 544 | – | – | 343 | – | – | – | 7,676 |
| Toronto North – B | New | Con | 4,502 | 52.40% | 632 | 7.36% | 60.40% | 4,502 | 3,870 | – | – | – | 220 | – | – | – | 8,592 |
| Toronto South - A | Con | Con | 5,202 | 74.69% | 3,103 | 44.55% | 47.61% | 5,202 | – | 1,473 | – | – | 290 | – | – | – | 6,965 |
| Toronto South – B | New | Con | 4,947 | 67.67% | 2,848 | 38.95% | 49.94% | 4,947 | 2,099 | – | – | – | 265 | – | – | – | 7,311 |
| Toronto West - A | Con | Con | 6,190 | 70.58% | 3,975 | 45.32% | 47.86% | 6,190 | 1,877 | 56 | – | 301 | 297 | – | – | 49 | 8,770 |
| Toronto West – B | New | Con | 4,160 | 47.41% | 1,945 | 22.17% | 47.88% | 4,160 | 2,215 | 380 | 1,870 | – | 150 | – | – | – | 8,775 |
| Victoria East | Con | Con | acclaimed | | | | | | | | | | | | | | |
| Victoria West | Con | Con | 2,061 | 50.50% | 98 | 2.40% | 94.00% | 2,061 | 1,963 | – | – | – | 57 | – | – | – | 4,081 |
| Waterloo North | Con | Con | 3,063 | 49.42% | 332 | 5.36% | 76.73% | 3,063 | 2,731 | – | – | – | 404 | – | – | – | 6,198 |
| Waterloo South | Con | Con | 2,353 | 63.49% | 1,000 | 26.98% | 54.01% | 2,353 | – | 1,353 | – | – | – | – | – | – | 3,706 |
| Welland | Con | Con | 3,729 | 56.57% | 866 | 13.14% | 77.32% | 3,729 | 2,863 | – | – | – | – | – | – | – | 6,592 |
| Wellington East | Con | Con | 1,898 | 53.06% | 219 | 6.12% | 82.09% | 1,898 | 1,679 | – | – | – | – | – | – | – | 3,577 |
| Wellington South | Con | Con | 2,787 | 52.12% | 399 | 7.46% | 78.67% | 2,787 | 2,388 | – | – | – | 172 | – | – | – | 5,347 |
| Wellington West | Con | Lib | 1,665 | 50.53% | 35 | 1.06% | 83.14% | 1,630 | 1,665 | – | – | – | – | – | – | – | 3,295 |
| Wentworth North | Lib | Con | 1,600 | 50.60% | 119 | 3.76% | 90.98% | 1,600 | 1,481 | – | 81 | – | – | – | – | – | 3,162 |
| Wentworth South | Lib | Lib | 1,582 | 53.72% | 219 | 7.44% | 85.19% | 1,363 | 1,582 | – | – | – | – | – | – | – | 2,945 |
| York East | Con | Con | 2,998 | 56.84% | 722 | 13.69% | 65.47% | 2,998 | 2,276 | – | – | – | – | – | – | – | 5,274 |
| York North | Con | Con | 2,918 | 54.00% | 432 | 7.99% | 92.95% | 2,918 | 2,486 | – | – | – | – | – | – | – | 5,404 |
| York West | Con | Con | 3,241 | 61.80% | 1,453 | 27.71% | 54.81% | 3,241 | 1,788 | – | – | – | – | – | – | 215 | 5,244 |

= open seat
= turnout is above provincial average
= winning candidate was in previous Legislature
= incumbent had switched allegiance
= previously incumbent in another riding
= not incumbent; was previously elected to the Legislature
= incumbency arose from byelection gain
= incumbency arose from prior election result being overturned by the court
= other incumbents renominated
= previously an MP in the House of Commons of Canada
= multiple candidates

=== Analysis ===
Party candidates in 2nd place (Note: excluding Ottawa seats)
| Party in 1st place | Party in 2nd place | | | | | | | | | Total |
| Party in 1st place | Accl | Con | Lib | Lab | I-Con | I-Lib | Ind | L-Tmp | Proh | Total |
|---|---|---|---|---|---|---|---|---|---|---|
| Conservative | 6 | | 69 | 4 | 4 | | 1 | 1 | 1 | 86 |
| Liberal | | 18 | | | | 1 | | | | 19 |
| Labour | | 1 | | | | | | | | 1 |
| Total | 6 | 19 | 69 | 4 | 4 | 1 | 1 | 1 | 1 | 106 |

Candidates ranked 1st to 5th place, by party
| Parties | Accl | 1st | 2nd | 3rd | 4th | 5th |
|---|---|---|---|---|---|---|
| █ Conservative | 6 | 80 | 19 | | | |
| █ Liberal | | 19 | 69 | 2 | | |
| █ Labour | | 1 | 4 | 1 | 1 | 1 |
| █ Independent Conservative | | | 4 | 2 | | |
| █ Independent | | | 1 | 3 | 1 | |
| █ Independent Liberal | | | 1 | 1 | | |
| █ Prohibitionist | | | 1 | | | |
| █ Liberal-Temperance | | | 1 | | | |
| █ Socialist | | | | 10 | 2 | 1 |

Resulting composition of the 10th Legislative Assembly of Ontario
| Source | | Party | | | |
|---|---|---|---|---|---|
| Source | | Con | Lib | Lab | Total |
| Seats retained | Incumbents returned | 49 | 7 | | 56 |
| Seats retained | Acclamations | 6 | | | 6 |
| Seats retained | Open seats held | 2 | 3 | | 5 |
| Seats changing hands | Incumbents defeated | 6 | 6 | | 12 |
| Seats changing hands | Open seats gained | 9 | 2 | | 11 |
| Seats changing hands | Byelection gains held | 1 | | 1 | 2 |
| New seats | New MLAs | 9 | | | 9 |
| New seats | Previously incumbent in the Legislature | 4 | 1 | | 5 |
| Total | | 86 | 19 | 1 | 106 |

=== MLAs elected by region and riding ===
Party designations are as follows:

Conservative
Liberal
Labour

Northern Ontario

- Algoma: William Ross Smyth (Note: Resigned before the opening of the first session, in order to stand and win in Algoma East in the 1908 federal election. Albert Grigg (Conservative) won the subsequent byelection.)
- Fort William: Thomas Smellie
- Kenora: Harold Arthur Clement Machin
- Manitoulin: Robert Roswell Gamey
- Nipissing: Henri Morel
- Port Arthur: John James Carrick
- Rainy River: William Alfred Preston
- Sault Ste. Marie: William Howard Hearst
- Sturgeon Falls: Azaire Adulphe Aubin
- Sudbury: Francis Cochrane
- Timiskaming: Robert Taylor Shillington

Ottawa Valley

- Carleton: Robert Herbert McElroy
- Lanark North: Richard Franklin Preston
- Lanark South: Arthur James Matheson
- Ottawa East: Donald Joseph McDougal
- Ottawa West: Alfred Ernest Fripp
- Prescott: George Hector Pharand
- Renfrew North: Norman Reid
- Renfrew South: Thomas William McGarry
- Russell: Damase Racine

Saint Lawrence Valley

- Brockville: Albert Edward Donovan
- Dundas: James Pliny Whitney
- Glengarry: Donald Robert McDonald
- Grenville: George Howard Ferguson
- Kingston: William Folger Nickle
- Leeds: John Robertson Dargavel
- Stormont: William John McCart

Central Ontario

- Addington: William James Paul
- Durham East: Josiah Johnston Preston
- Durham West: John Henry Devitt
- Frontenac: John S. Gallagher
- Hastings East: Amos Augustus Richardson
- Hastings North: Josiah Williams Pearce
- Hastings West: John Wesley Johnson
- Lennox: Thomas George Carscallen
- Northumberland East: Samuel Greerson Nesbitt
- Northumberland West: Samuel Clarke
- Peterborough East: James Thompson
- Peterborough West: Thomas Evans Bradburn
- Prince Edward: Robert Addison Norman
- Victoria East: John Hilliard Carnegie
- Victoria West: Samuel John Fox

Georgian Bay

- Bruce North: Charles Martin Bowman
- Grey North: Alexander Grant MacKay
- Muskoka: Arthur Arnold Mahaffy
- Parry Sound: John Galna
- Simcoe Centre: Alfred Burke Thompson
- Simcoe East: James Brockett Tudhope
- Simcoe South: Alexander Ferguson
- Simcoe West: James Stoddart Duff

Wentworth/Halton/Niagara

- Halton: Alfred Westland Nixon
- Hamilton East: Allan Studholme
- Hamilton West: John Strathearn Hendrie
- Lincoln: Elisha Jessop
- Monck: James Alway Ross
- Welland: Evan Eugene Fraser
- Wentworth North: Gordon Crooks Wilson
- Wentworth South: Daniel Reed

Midwestern Ontario

- Brant North: John Henry Fisher
- Brant South: Willoughby Staples Brewster
- Bruce Centre: Hugh Clark
- Bruce South: Reuben Eldridge Truax
- Dufferin: Charles Robert McKeown
- Grey Centre: Isaac Benson Lucas
- Grey South: David Jamieson
- Haldimand: Jacob Kohler
- Huron Centre: William Proudfoot
- Huron North: Armstrong Musgrove
- Huron South: Henry Eilber
- Norfolk North: Hugh Paterson Innes
- Norfolk South: Arthur Clarence Pratt
- Oxford North: Andrew MacKay
- Oxford South: Thomas Richard Mayberry
- Perth North: James Torrance
- Perth South: Valentine Stock
- Waterloo North: Henry George Lackner
- Waterloo South: George Pattinson
- Wellington East: James J. Craig
- Wellington South: Joseph Patrick Downey
- Wellington West: James McEwing

Southwestern Ontario

- Elgin East: Charles Andrew Brower
- Elgin West: Findlay George MacDiarmid
- Essex North: Joseph Octave Reaume
- Essex South: Charles N. Anderson
- Kent East: Philip Henry Bowyer
- Kent West: George William Sulman
- Lambton East: Robert John McCormick
- Lambton West: William John Hanna
- London: Adam Beck
- Middlesex East: George Wesley Neely
- Middlesex North: Duncan Campbell Ross
- Middlesex West: John Campbell Elliott

Peel/York/Ontario

- Ontario North: William Henry Hoyle
- Ontario South: Charles Calder
- Peel: Samuel Charters
- York East: Alexander McCowan
- York North: Thomas Herbert Lennox
- York West: Forbes Godfrey

Toronto

- Toronto East - A: Robert Allan Pyne
- Toronto East - B: Thomas Richard Whitesides
- Toronto North - A: William Kirkpatrick McNaught
- Toronto North - B: John Shaw
- Toronto South - A: J.J. Foy
- Toronto South - B: George Horace Gooderham
- Toronto West - A: Thomas Crawford
- Toronto West - B: William David McPherson

=== Division and reorganization of ridings ===
The newly created ridings returned the following MLAs:

| 1905 | | 1908 | |
| Riding | Party | Riding | Party |
|---|---|---|---|
| Fort William and Lake of the Woods | █ Conservative | Fort William | █ Conservative |
| Fort William and Lake of the Woods | █ Conservative | Kenora | █ Conservative |
| Port Arthur and Rainy River | █ Liberal | Port Arthur | █ Conservative |
| Port Arthur and Rainy River | █ Liberal | Rainy River | █ Conservative |
| Nipissing East | █ Conservative | Nipissing | █ Conservative |
| Nipissing East | █ Conservative | Timiskaming | █ Conservative |
| Nipissing West | █ Conservative | Sudbury | █ Conservative |
| Nipissing West | █ Conservative | Sturgeon Falls | █ Conservative |
| Ottawa | █ Liberal (2 MLAs) | Ottawa East | █ Liberal |
| Ottawa | █ Liberal (2 MLAs) | Ottawa West | █ Conservative |
| Toronto East | █ Conservative | Seat A | █ Conservative |
| Toronto East | █ Conservative | Seat B | █ Conservative |
| Toronto North | █ Conservative | Seat A | █ Conservative |
| Toronto North | █ Conservative | Seat B | █ Conservative |
| Toronto South | █ Conservative | Seat A | █ Conservative |
| Toronto South | █ Conservative | Seat B | █ Conservative |
| Toronto West | █ Conservative | Seat A | █ Conservative |
| Toronto West | █ Conservative | Seat B | █ Conservative |
| Huron East | █ Liberal | Huron North | █ Conservative |
| Huron West | █ Liberal | Huron Centre | █ Liberal |

=== Seats that changed hands ===
Elections to the 12th Parliament of Ontario – unaltered seats won/lost by party, 1905–1908
| Party | 1905 | Gain from (loss to) | | | | | | | | 1908 |
| Party | 1905 | Con | | Lib | | I-Lib | | Lab | | 1908 |
|---|---|---|---|---|---|---|---|---|---|---|
| Conservative | 62 | | | 14 | (8) | 1 | | | (1) | 68 |
| Liberal | 23 | 8 | (14) | | | | | | | 17 |
| Independent-Liberal | 1 | | (1) | | | | | | | – |
| Labour | – | 1 | | | | | | | | 1 |
| Total | 86 | 9 | (15) | 14 | (8) | 1 | – | – | (1) | 86 |

Of the unaltered seats, there were 24 that changed allegiance in the election:

Liberal to Conservative

- Brant South
- Brockville
- Essex South
- Glengarry
- Kent West
- Kingston
- Monck
- Norfolk North
- Peel
- Peterborough East
- Prescott
- Prince Edward
- Sault Ste. Marie
- Wentworth North

Independent-Liberal to Conservative

- Hastings East

Conservative to Liberal

- Bruce South
- Lambton East
- Middlesex North
- Oxford South
- Perth South
- Renfrew North
- Stormont
- Wellington West

Conservative to Labour

- Hamilton East

== See also ==
- Politics of Ontario
- List of Ontario political parties
- Premier of Ontario
- Leader of the Opposition (Ontario)
