= 9th Parliament of Ontario =

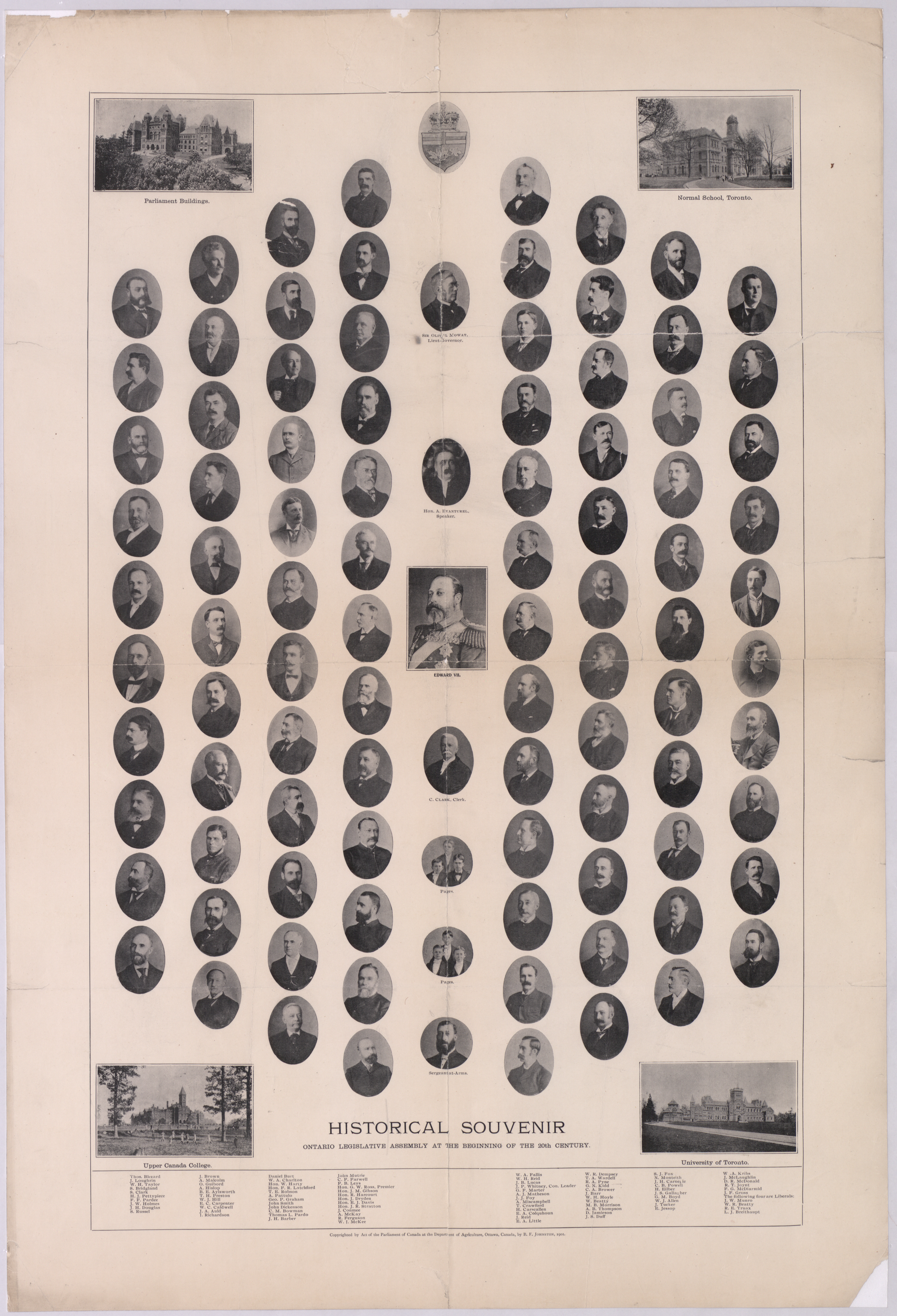
Historical souvenir, Ontario Legislative Assembly in 1901. B. F. Johnston, British Library.

The 9th Legislative Assembly of Ontario was in session from March 1, 1898, until April 19, 1902, just prior to the 1902 general election. The majority party was the Ontario Liberal Party led by Arthur Sturgis Hardy. George William Ross became the Liberal leader when Hardy retired in 1899.

François-Eugène-Alfred Évanturel served as speaker for the assembly.

== Members of the Assembly ==
Riding	Member	Party	First elected / previously elected	No. of terms
Addington	James Reid	Conservative	1890	3rd term
Algoma East	Charles Franklin Farwell	Liberal	1894	2nd term
Algoma West	James Conmee	Liberal	1885, 1895	5th term*
Brant	Daniel Burt	Liberal	1895	2nd term
Brant South	Arthur Sturgis Hardy (Note: retired from politics in 1899)	Liberal	1873	8th term
Brant South	Thomas Hiram Preston (1899)	Liberal	1899	1st term
Brockville	George Perry Graham	Liberal	1898	1st term
Bruce Centre	Andrew Malcolm	Liberal	1898	1st term
Bruce North	Charles Martin Bowman	Liberal	1898	1st term
Bruce South	Reuben Eldridge Truax	Liberal	1894	2nd term
Cardwell	Edward Alfred Little	Conservative	1894	2nd term
Carleton	George Nelson Kidd	Independent Conservative	1894	2nd term
Dufferin	John Barr	Conservative	1875, 1890, 1898	4th term*
Dundas	James Pliny Whitney	Conservative	1888	4th term
Durham East	William Armstrong Fallis	Conservative	1894	2nd term
Durham West	William Henry Reid	Conservative	1894	2nd term
Elgin East	Charles Andrew Brower	Conservative	1894	2nd term
Elgin West	Findlay George MacDiarmid (Note: unseated after an appeal)	Conservative	1898	1st term
Elgin West	Donald Macnish (1899)	Liberal	1894, 1899	2nd term*
Elgin West	Findlay George MacDiarmid (1900)	Conservative	1898, 1900	2nd term*
Essex North	William J. McKee	Liberal	1894	2nd term
Essex South	John Allan Auld	Liberal	1896	2nd term
Frontenac	John S. Gallagher	Conservative	1898	1st term
Glengarry	Donald Robert McDonald	Conservative	1898	1st term
Grenville	Robert L. Joynt	Conservative	1898	1st term
Grey Centre	Isaac Benson Lucas	Conservative	1898	1st term
Grey North	George Milward Boyd	Conservative	1898	1st term
Grey South	David Jamieson	Conservative	1898	1st term
Haldimand	Joseph William Holmes	Liberal	1898	1st term
Halton	John Roaf Barber	Liberal	1898	1st term
Hamilton East	Henry Carscallen	Conservative	1898	1st term
Hamilton West	Edward Alexander Colquhoun	Conservative	1898	1st term
Hastings East	Samuel Russell	Liberal	1898	1st term
Hastings North	William John Allen	Conservative	1898	1st term
Hastings West	Marshall Bidwell Morrison	Conservative	1898	1st term
Huron East	Archibald Hislop	Liberal	1898	1st term
Huron South	Henry Eilber	Conservative	1898	1st term
Huron West	James Thompson Garrow	Liberal	1890	3rd term
Kent East	Robert Ferguson (Note: died in 1901)	Liberal	1885	5th term
Kent East	John Lee (1901)	Liberal	1901	1st term
Kent West	Thomas Letson Pardo	Liberal	1894	2nd term
Kingston	William Harty (Note: elected to federal seat)	Liberal	1895	2nd term
Kingston	Edward John Barker Pense (1901)	Liberal	1901	1st term
Lambton East	Henry John Pettypiece	Liberal	1898	1st term
Lambton West	Frederick Forsyth Pardee	Liberal	1898	1st term
Lanark North	William Clyde Caldwell	Liberal	1872, 1879, 1888, 1898	6th term*
Lanark South	Arthur James Matheson	Conservative	1894	2nd term
Leeds	Walter Beatty	Conservative	1894	2nd term
Lennox	Bowen Ebenezer Aylsworth	Liberal	1898	1st term
Lincoln	Elisha Jessop	Conservative	1898	1st term
London	Francis Baxter Leys	Liberal	1898	1st term
Middlesex East	Thomas D. Hodgins	Conservative	1898	1st term
Middlesex East	Thomas Robson (1900)	Conservative	1900	1st term
Middlesex North	William Henry Taylor	Liberal	1894	2nd term
Middlesex West	George William Ross	Liberal	1883	5th term
Monck	Richard Harcourt	Liberal	1879	6th term
Muskoka	Samuel Bridgeland	Liberal	1898	1st term
Nipissing	John Loughrin	Liberal	1890	3rd term
Norfolk North	Edwin Clarendon Carpenter	Liberal	1891	3rd term
Norfolk South	William Andrew Charlton	Liberal	1890	3rd term
Northumberland East	John Henry Douglas	Liberal	1898	1st term
Northumberland West	Samuel Clarke	Liberal	1898	1st term
Ontario North	William Henry Hoyle	Conservative	1898	1st term
Ontario South	Charles Calder	Conservative	1898	1st term
Ontario South	John Dryden (1899)	Liberal	1879, 1899	6th term*
Ottawa (Note: Ottawa had 2 seats)	Charles Berkeley Powell	Conservative	1898	1st term
Ottawa	Alexander Lumsden	Liberal	1898	1st term
Oxford North	Andrew Pattulo	Liberal	1896	2nd term
Oxford South	Angus McKay	Liberal	1886	4th term
Parry Sound	William Rabb Beatty	Liberal	1894	2nd term
Peel	John Smith	Liberal	1892	3rd term
Perth North	John Brown	Liberal	1898	1st term
Perth South	William Caven Moscrip	Liberal	1898	1st term
Perth South	Samuel Nelson Monteith (1899)	Conservative	1899	1st term
Peterborough East	Thomas Blezard	Liberal	1879	6th term
Peterborough West	James Robert Stratton	Liberal	1886	4th term
Prescott	Francis Eugene Alfred Evanturel	Liberal	1886	4th term
Prince Edward	William Ryerson Dempsey	Conservative	1898	1st term
Renfrew North	Andrew Thomas White (Note: died in 1900)	Conservative	1898	1st term
Renfrew North	John W. Munro (1900)	Liberal	1900	1st term
Renfrew South	Robert Adam Campbell	Liberal	1894	2nd term
Renfrew South	Francis Robert Latchford (1899)	Liberal	1899	1st term
Russell	Onésime Guibord	Liberal	1898	1st term
Simcoe Centre	Alfred Burke Thompson	Conservative	1898	1st term
Simcoe East	Andrew Miscampbell	Conservative	1890	3rd term
Simcoe West	James Stoddart Duff	Conservative	1898	1st term
Stormont	John McLaughlin	Conservative	1898	1st term
Toronto East	Robert Allan Pyne	Conservative	1898	1st term
Toronto North	George Frederick Marter	Conservative	1886	4th term
Toronto South	J.J. Foy	Conservative	1898	1st term
Toronto West	Thomas Crawford	Conservative	1894	2nd term
Victoria East	John Hilliard Carnegie	Conservative	1894	2nd term
Victoria West	Samuel John Fox	Conservative	1898	1st term
Waterloo North	Henry George Lackner	Conservative	1898	1st term
Waterloo North	Louis Jacob Breithaupt (1899)	Liberal	1899	1st term
Waterloo South	William Abram Kribs	Conservative	1898	1st term
Welland	William Manley German	Liberal	1898	1st term
Welland	John Franklin Gross (1900)	Liberal	1900	1st term
Wellington East	John Craig< (Note: died in 1898)	Liberal	1894	2nd term
Wellington East	John Morison Gibson (1899)	Liberal	1879, (Note: Hamilton) 1891, (Note: Hamilton West) 1899	6th term*
Wellington South	John Mutrie	Liberal	1894	2nd term
Wellington West	James Tucker	Conservative	1896	2nd term
Wentworth North	Thomas Atkins Wardell	Conservative	1898	1st term
Wentworth South	John Dickenson	Liberal	1896	2nd term
York East	John Richardson	Liberal	1894	2nd term
York North	Elihu James Davis	Liberal	1888	4th term
York West	William James Hill	Liberal	1898	1st term

== Timeline ==
9th Legislative Assembly of Ontario - Movement in seats held (1898-1902)
Party	1898	Gain/(loss) due to					1902
Party	1898	Void election	Resignation as MPP	Death in office	Byelection gain	Byelection hold	1902
Liberal	51	(3)	(4)	(2)	4	6	52
Conservative	42	(2)		(2)	2	1	41
Independent-Conservative	1						1
Total	94	(5)	(4)	(4)	6	7	94

Changes in seats held (1898–1902)
Seat	Before				Change		
Seat	Date	Member	Party	Reason	Date	Member	Party
Wellington East	September 6, 1898	John Craig	█ Liberal	Died in office	October 27, 1898	John Morison Gibson	█ Liberal
Elgin West	October 12, 1898	Findlay George MacDiarmid	█ Conservative	Election declared void	January 12, 1899	Donald Macnish	█ Liberal
Ontario South	October 13, 1898	Charles Calder	█ Conservative	Election declared void	December 12, 1899	John Dryden	█ Liberal
Perth South	January 27, 1899	William Caven Moscrip	█ Liberal	Election declared void	February 28, 1899	Samuel Nelson Monteith	█ Conservative
Waterloo North	April 1, 1899	Henry George Lackner	█ Conservative	Election declared void	October 31, 1900 (Note: returned by acclamation)	Louis Jacob Breithaupt	█ Liberal
Brant South	October 17, 1899	Arthur Sturgis Hardy	█ Liberal	Retired from politics	December 12, 1899	Thomas Hiram Preston	█ Liberal
Renfrew South	October 25, 1899	Robert Adam Campbell	█ Liberal	Resigned to provide a seat for Latchford	November 14, 1899	Francis Robert Latchford	█ Liberal
Middlesex East	November 20, 1899	Thomas D. Hodgins	█ Conservative	Died in office	January 31, 1900	Thomas Robson	█ Conservative
Elgin West	November 21, 1899	Donald Macnish	█ Liberal	Election declared void	December 12, 1899	Findlay George MacDiarmid	█ Conservative
Welland	April 30, 1900	William Manley German	█ Liberal	Chose to stand for Welland in the 1900 federal election	December 13, 1900	John Franklin Gross	█ Liberal
Renfrew North	May 17, 1900	Andrew Thomas White	█ Conservative	Died in office	June 19, 1900	John W. Munro	█ Liberal
Kingston	April 15, 1901	William Harty	█ Liberal	Chose to stand for Kingston in the 1902 federal byelection	January 30, 1902	Edward John Barker Pense	█ Liberal
Kent East	September 7, 1901	Robert Ferguson	█ Liberal	Died in office	November 4, 1901	John Lee	█ Liberal

Re-elections on seats being vacated (1898–1902)
Seat	Incumbent	Party	Vacated	Reason	By-election
Lennox	Bowen Ebenezer Aylsworth	█ Liberal	October 20, 1898	Election declared void	November 18, 1898
Huron West	James Thompson Garrow	█ Liberal	November 2, 1898	Resignation in exchange for withdrawal of election petition	December 8, 1898
Halton	John Roaf Barber	█ Liberal	November 4, 1898	Election declared void	December 8, 1898
Hastings North	William John Allen	█ Conservative	November 13, 1898	Resignation in exchange for withdrawal of election petition	December 27, 1898
Nipissing	John Loughrin	█ Liberal	November 16, 1898	Election declared void	December 27, 1898
Northumberland East	John Henry Douglas	█ Liberal	November 18, 1898	Election declared void	December 14, 1898
Elgin East	Charles Andrew Brower	█ Conservative	April 1, 1899	Election declared void	December 12, 1899
Peterborough West	James Robert Stratton	█ Liberal	October 21, 1899	Sought re-election upon appointment as Provincial Secretary and Registrar	November 7, 1899
Ontario South	John Dryden	█ Liberal	November 21, 1899	Election declared void	December 12, 1899
Waterloo North	Louis Jacob Breithaupt	█ Liberal	October 19, 1900	Election declared void	October 31, 1900
Huron West	James Thompson Garrow	█ Liberal	March 12, 1901	Election declared void	December 4, 1901
London	Francis Baxter Leys	█ Liberal	April 15, 1901	Sought re-election in support of removing a dam on the Thames River	July 9, 1901
