= 12th Parliament of Ontario =

Parliament of Ontario

The 12th Legislative Assembly of Ontario was in session from June 8, 1908, until November 13, 1911, just prior to the 1911 general election. The majority party was the Ontario Conservative Party led by Sir James P. Whitney.

Thomas Crawford served as speaker for the assembly.

== Members of the Assembly ==
Riding	Member	Party	First elected / previously elected	No. of terms	Comments
Addington	William James Paul	Conservative	1905	2nd term	
Algoma	William Ross Smyth (Note: elected to federal seat)	Conservative	1902	3rd term	
Algoma	Albert Grigg (1908)	Conservative	1908	1st term	
Brant	John Henry Fisher	Conservative	1905	2nd term	
Brant South	Willoughby Staples Brewster	Conservative	1908	1st term	
Brockville	Albert Edward Donovan	Conservative	1907	2nd term	
Bruce Centre	Hugh Clark	Conservative	1902	3rd term	
Bruce North	Charles Martin Bowman	Liberal	1898	4th term	
Bruce South	Reuben Eldridge Truax	Liberal	1894, 1908	4th term*	
Carleton	Robert Herbert McElroy	Conservative	1907	2nd term	
Dufferin	Charles Robert McKeown	Conservative	1907	2nd term	
Dundas	James Pliny Whitney	Conservative	1888	7th term	Premier in Whitney ministry
Durham East	Josiah Johnston Preston	Conservative	1902	3rd term	
Durham West	John Henry Devitt	Conservative	1905	2nd term	
Elgin East	Charles Andrew Brower	Conservative	1894	5th term	
Elgin West	Findlay George MacDiarmid	Conservative	1898, 1900	5th term*	
Essex North	Joseph Octave Reaume	Conservative	1902	3rd term	Minister of Public Works in Whitney ministry
Essex South	Charles N. Anderson	Conservative	1908	1st term	
Fort William	Thomas Smellie	Conservative	1905	2nd term	
Frontenac	John S. Gallagher	Conservative	1898	4th term	
Glengarry	Donald Robert McDonald	Conservative	1898, 1908	2nd term*	
Grenville	George Howard Ferguson	Conservative	1905	2nd term	
Grey Centre	Isaac Benson Lucas	Conservative	1898	4th term	
Grey North	Alexander Grant MacKay	Liberal	1902	3rd term	Leader of the Opposition
Grey South	David Jamieson	Conservative	1898	4th term	
Haldimand	Jacob Kohler	Liberal	1905	2nd term	
Halton	Alfred Westland Nixon	Conservative	1905	2nd term	
Hamilton East	Allan Studholme	Labour	1906	2nd term	
Hamilton West	John Strathearn Hendrie	Conservative	1902	3rd term	
Hastings East	Amos Augustus Richardson	Conservative	1908	1st term	
Hastings North	Josiah Williams Pearce	Conservative	1902	3rd term	
Hastings West	John Wesley Johnson	Conservative	1908	1st term	
Huron Centre	William Proudfoot	Liberal	1908	1st term	
Huron North	Armstrong Musgrove	Conservative	1908	1st term	
Huron South	Henry Eilber	Conservative	1898	4th term	
Kenora	Harold Arthur Clement Machin	Conservative	1908	1st term	
Kent East	Philip Henry Bowyer	Conservative	1905	2nd term	
Kent West	George William Sulman	Conservative	1908	1st term	
Kingston	William Folger Nickle	Conservative	1908	1st term	
Lambton East	Robert John McCormick	Liberal	1908	1st term	
Lambton West	William John Hanna	Conservative	1902	3rd term	Provincial Secretary and Registrar in Whitney ministry
Lanark North	Richard Franklin Preston	Conservative	1894, 1905	3rd term*	
Lanark South	Arthur James Matheson	Conservative	1894	5th term	Treasurer in Whitney ministry
Leeds	John Robertson Dargavel	Conservative	1905	2nd term	
Lennox	Thomas George Carscallen	Conservative	1902	3rd term	
Lincoln	Elisha Jessop	Conservative	1898	4th term	
London	Adam Beck	Conservative	1902	3rd term	
Manitoulin	Robert Roswell Gamey	Conservative	1902	3rd term	
Middlesex East	George Wesley Neely	Conservative	1905	2nd term	
Middlesex North	Duncan Campbell Ross	Liberal	1907	2nd term	
Middlesex North	James William Doyle (1909)	Conservative	1909	1st term	
Middlesex West	John Campbell Elliott	Liberal	1908	1st term	
Monck	James Alway Ross	Conservative	1908	1st term	
Muskoka	Arthur Arnold Mahaffy	Conservative	1903	3rd term	
Nipissing	Henri Morel	Conservative	1908	1st term	
Norfolk North	Hugh Paterson Innes	Conservative	1908	1st term	
Norfolk South	Arthur Clarence Pratt	Conservative	1905	2nd term	
Northumberland East	Samuel Greerson Nesbitt	Conservative	1908	1st term	
Northumberland West	Samuel Clarke	Liberal	1898	4th term	
Ontario North	William Henry Hoyle	Conservative	1898	4th term	
Ontario South	Charles Calder	Conservative	1898, 1905	3rd term*	
Ottawa East	Donald Joseph McDougal	Liberal	1905	2nd term	
Ottawa West	Alfred Ernest Fripp	Conservative	1908	1st term	
Oxford North	Andrew MacKay	Liberal	1908	1st term	
Oxford South	Thomas Richard Mayberry	Liberal	1908	1st term	
Parry Sound	John Galna	Conservative	1905	2nd term	
Peel	Samuel Charters	Conservative	1908	1st term	
Perth North	James Torrance	Conservative	1905	2nd term	
Perth South	Valentine Stock	Liberal	1902, 1908	2nd term*	
Peterborough East	James Thompson	Conservative	1908	1st term	
Peterborough West	Thomas Evans Bradburn	Conservative	1905	2nd term	
Port Arthur	John James Carrick	Conservative	1908	1st term	
Prescott	George Hector Pharand	Conservative	1908	1st term	
Prince Edward	Robert Addison Norman	Conservative	1908	1st term	
Rainy River	William Alfred Preston	Conservative	1907	2nd term	
Renfrew North	Norman Reid	Liberal	1908	1st term	
Renfrew South	Thomas William McGarry	Conservative	1905	2nd term	
Russell	Damase Racine	Liberal	1905	2nd term	
Sault Ste. Marie	William Howard Hearst	Conservative	1908	1st term	
Simcoe Centre	Alfred Burke Thompson	Conservative	1898, 1905	3rd term*	
Simcoe East	James Brockett Tudhope	Liberal	1902	3rd term	
Simcoe South	Alexander Ferguson	Conservative	1906	2nd term	
Simcoe West	James Stoddart Duff	Conservative	1898	4th term	Ministry of Agriculture in Whitney ministry
Stormont	William John McCart	Liberal	1902, 1908	2nd term*	
Sturgeon Falls	Azaire Adulphe Aubin	Conservative	1905	2nd term	
Sudbury	Francis Cochrane	Conservative	1905	2nd term	Minister of Lands, Mines and Forests in Whitney ministry
Timiskaming	Robert Taylor Shillington	Conservative	1908	1st term	
Toronto East - A	Robert Allan Pyne	Conservative	1898	4th term	
Toronto East - B	Thomas Richard Whitesides	Conservative	1908	1st term	
Toronto North - A	William Kirkpatrick McNaught	Conservative	1906	2nd term	
Toronto North - B	John Shaw	Conservative	1908	1st term	
Toronto South - A	J.J. Foy	Conservative	1898	4th term	Attorney General in Whitney ministry
Toronto South - B	George Horace Gooderham	Conservative	1908	1st term	
Toronto West - A	Thomas Crawford	Conservative	1894	5th term	Speaker
Toronto West - B	William David McPherson	Conservative	1908	1st term	
Victoria East	John Hilliard Carnegie (Note: retired)	Conservative	1894	5th term	
Victoria East	Robert Mercer Mason (1909)	Conservative	1909	1st term	
Victoria West	Samuel John Fox	Conservative	1898	4th term	
Waterloo North	Henry George Lackner	Conservative	1898, 1902	4th term*	
Waterloo South	George Pattinson	Conservative	1905	2nd term	
Welland	Evan Eugene Fraser	Conservative	1905	2nd term	
Wellington East	James J. Craig	Conservative	1905	2nd term	
Wellington South	Joseph Patrick Downey (Note: resigned to accept appointment)	Conservative	1902	3rd term	
Wellington South	John Ransom Howitt (1910)	Conservative	1910	1st term	
Wellington West	James McEwing	Liberal	1908	1st term	
Wentworth North	Gordon Crooks Wilson	Conservative	1908	1st term	
Wentworth South	Daniel Reed	Liberal	1905	2nd term	
York East	Alexander McCowan	Conservative	1905	2nd term	
York North	Thomas Herbert Lennox	Conservative	1905	2nd term	
York West	Forbes Godfrey	Conservative	1907	2nd term	
