= Robert Sutherland (disambiguation) =

Robert Sutherland (1830–1878) was the first known graduate of colour at a Canadian university, and the first black man to study law in North America.

Robert Sutherland may also refer to:

- Robert Sutherland, 6th Earl of Sutherland (died 1444)
- Robert Franklin Sutherland (1859–1922), Canadian politician and speaker of the Canadian House of Commons
- Robert Sutherland (Washington politician) (born 1958/9), American politician in the Washington House of Representatives
- Robert E. Sutherland, character in The 13th Man
- Robert Sutherland (Middlesex East politician) (died 1912), Canadian politician from Ontario
- Robert Sutherland (athlete), Scottish middle-distance runner

== See also ==
- Robert Sutherland Rattray (1881–1938), anthropologist
- Robert Sutherland Telfer (born 1977), American television actor
