= Middlesex East =

Middlesex East can refer to:

- Middlesex East (federal electoral district)
- Middlesex East (provincial electoral district)
