= Donald MacKenzie (Ontario politician) =

Canadian politician

Member of the Ontario Provincial Parliament for Middlesex East
- In office February 27, 1883 – November 15, 1886
- Preceded by: Richard Tooley
- Succeeded by: Richard Tooley

Personal details
- Party: Liberal

Donald MacKenzie was a Canadian politician from Ontario. He represented Middlesex East in the Legislative Assembly of Ontario from 1883 to 1886.

== See also ==
- 5th Parliament of Ontario
