= James Evans (Ontario politician) =

Canadian politician

Ontario MPP
- In office 1867–1871
- Preceded by: Riding established
- Succeeded by: Richard Tooley
- Constituency: Middlesex East

Personal details
- Born: January 18, 1821
- Died: March 20, 1880 (aged 59)
- Party: Liberal

James Evans (January 18, 1821 – March 20, 1880) was an Ontario political figure. He represented Middlesex East in the Legislative Assembly of Ontario from 1867 to 1871 as a Liberal member.

Evans served as reeve of West Nissouri. He ran unsuccessfully for the East Middlesex seat in the legislative assembly for the Province of Canada in 1863. He was also an unsuccessful candidate for East Middlesex in the 1872 federal election.

== Electoral history ==
1867 Ontario general election: Middlesex East
Party	Candidate	Votes	%
Liberal	James Evans	1,821	50.42
Conservative	Mr. Taylor	1,791	49.58
Total valid votes		3,612	86.62
Eligible voters		4,170	
Liberal pickup new district.			
Source: Elections Ontario

1871 Ontario general election: Middlesex East
Party	Candidate	Votes	%	±%
Conservative	Richard Tooley	1,622	51.41	+1.83
Liberal	James Evans	1,533	48.59	−1.83
Turnout		3,155	74.92	−11.70
Eligible voters		4,211		
Conservative gain from Liberal		Swing		+1.83
Source: Elections Ontario

1875 Ontario general election: Middlesex East
Party	Candidate	Votes	%	±%
Conservative	Richard Tooley	2,185	53.11	+1.70
Liberal	James Evans	1,929	46.89	−1.70
Total valid votes		4,114	72.87	−2.06
Eligible voters		5,646		
Conservative hold		Swing		+1.70
Source: Elections Ontario
