= Thomas Robson (politician) =

Canadian politician (1851–1940)

Member of the Ontario Provincial Parliament for Middlesex East
- In office January 31, 1900 – April 19, 1902
- Preceded by: Thomas D. Hodgins
- Succeeded by: George Albert Routledge

Personal details
- Party: Conservative

Thomas E. Robson (1851–1940) was a Canadian politician from Ontario. He represented Middlesex East in the Legislative Assembly of Ontario from 1900 to 1902.

In 1820, his English father immigrated from Cumberland and settled in London Township.

== See also ==
- 9th Parliament of Ontario
