= John Saunders Cruess =

Canadian politician

Ontario MPP
- In office 1886–1890
- Preceded by: New riding
- Succeeded by: John McKay
- Constituency: Victoria West

Personal details
- Born: February 5, 1827 Ohio, United States
- Died: August 5, 1897 (aged 70) Victoria County, Ontario
- Party: Conservative
- Spouse: Elisabeth Betts
- Occupation: Farmer

John Saunders Cruess (February 5, 1827 – 1897) was an Ontario farmer and political figure. He represented Victoria West in the Legislative Assembly of Ontario as a Conservative from 1886 to 1890.

He was born in Ohio in 1827, the son of John Cruess, an Irish-born Quaker of German descent, and came to Upper Canada with his family in 1829. Cruess married Eliza Betts. He operated a rural post office from 1879 to 1883 at Barclay and also served on the council for Mariposa Township. He was unsuccessful in an attempt at reelection in 1890. Cruess was president of the Patrons of Industry lodge in Linden Valley in 1892 and president of the County lodge in 1893.
