= William Shore =

Canadian politician

Ontario MPP
- In office 1894–1898
- Preceded by: Richard Tooley
- Succeeded by: Thomas D. Hodgins
- Constituency: Middlesex East

Personal details
- Born: 1846 Westminster Township, Canada West
- Died: October 24, 1910 (aged 63–64) St. Thomas, Ontario
- Party: Liberal-Protestant Protective Association
- Occupation: Farmer

William Shore (1846 – October 24, 1910) was an Ontario farmer and political figure. He represented Middlesex East in the Legislative Assembly of Ontario from 1894 to 1898 as a Liberal-Protestant Protective Association member.

He was born in Westminster Township, Canada West in 1846, the son of John Shore, who came to Upper Canada from England. He died October 24, 1910.
