= Charles Henry Mills (Canadian politician) =

Canadian businessman and politician (1861–1927)

Charles Henry Mills (October 27, 1861 – February 3, 1927) was an Ontario merchant and political figure. He represented Waterloo North in the Legislative Assembly of Ontario from 1912 to 1919 as a Conservative member.

He was born in Clinton, Canada West, the son of the Reverend John Mills, and was educated in Grimsby. In 1898, he married Bernice Wilton. Mills owned a dry goods store. He served on the Berlin (later Kitchener) town council and was president of the Berlin Board of Trade. He was the first president of the Canadian Club. Mills was elected to the provincial assembly in a 1912 by-election held after Henry George Lackner was named sheriff for Waterloo County.
