= George McHugh =

Canadian politician

George McHugh (7 July 1845 – 28 November 1926) was a farmer and political figure in Ontario, Canada. He represented Victoria South in the House of Commons of Canada from 1896 to 1900 as a Liberal. McHugh sat for Victoria in the Senate of Canada from 1901 to 1926.

He was born in Ops Township, Canada West, the son of Patrick McHugh and Ann Walker. He married Margaret O'Neill in 1873. McHugh was defeated by Adam Edward Vrooman when he ran for reelection in 1900. He died in office at the age of 81.
