= Richard Tooley =

Canadian politician

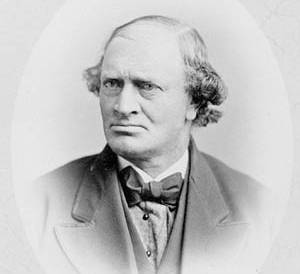

Ontario MPP
- In office 1886–1894
- Preceded by: Donald MacKenzie
- Succeeded by: William Shore
- In office 1871–1883
- Preceded by: James Evans
- Succeeded by: Donald MacKenzie
- Constituency: Middlesex East

Personal details
- Born: November 25, 1820 Devonshire, England
- Died: February 28, 1910 (aged 89)
- Party: Conservative

Richard Tooley (November 25, 1820 – February 28, 1910) was an Ontario farmer and political figure. He represented Middlesex East in the Legislative Assembly of Ontario from 1871 to 1883 and from 1886 to 1894 as a member of the Conservative party.

He was born in Devonshire, England in 1820 and came to Middlesex County in Canada West in 1855. He served on the town council for North Dorchester Township from 1863 to 1870 and was county warden in 1870. He was elected to the provincial assembly as a Conservative in 1871. He resigned in 1883 but ran again in 1886.

== Electoral history ==
1871 Ontario general election: Middlesex East
Party	Candidate	Votes	%	±%
Conservative	Richard Tooley	1,622	51.41	+1.83
Liberal	James Evans	1,533	48.59	−1.83
Turnout		3,155	74.92	−11.70
Eligible voters		4,211		
Conservative gain from Liberal		Swing		+1.83
Source: Elections Ontario

1875 Ontario general election: Middlesex East
Party	Candidate	Votes	%	±%
Conservative	Richard Tooley	2,185	53.11	+1.70
Liberal	James Evans	1,929	46.89	−1.70
Total valid votes		4,114	72.87	−2.06
Eligible voters		5,646		
Conservative hold		Swing		+1.70
Source: Elections Ontario

1879 Ontario general election: Middlesex East
Party	Candidate	Votes	%	±%
Conservative	Richard Tooley	2,546	51.86	−1.25
Liberal	Donald Mackenzie	2,363	48.14	+1.25
Total valid votes		4,909	66.82	−6.05
Eligible voters		7,347		
Conservative hold		Swing		−1.25
Source: Elections Ontario
