= John McFarlan =

Canadian politician from Ontario

Member of the Ontario Provincial Parliament for Middlesex East
- In office November 27, 1913 – September 23, 1919
- Preceded by: George Wesley Neely
- Succeeded by: John Willard Freeborn

Personal details
- Party: Conservative

John McFarlan was a Canadian politician from Ontario. He represented Middlesex East in the Legislative Assembly of Ontario from a 1913 by-election to 1919.

== See also ==
- 13th Parliament of Ontario
- 14th Parliament of Ontario
