= Thomas D. Hodgins =

Canadian politician (died 1899)

Member of the Ontario Provincial Parliament for Middlesex East
- In office March 1, 1898 – November 20, 1899
- Preceded by: William Shore
- Succeeded by: Thomas Robson

Personal details
- Party: Conservative

Thomas D. Hodgins (died November 20, 1899) was a Canadian politician from Ontario. He represented Middlesex East in the Legislative Assembly of Ontario from 1898 until his death in 1899.

== See also ==
- 9th Parliament of Ontario
