= George Albert Routledge =

Canadian politician

Ontario MPP
- In office 1902–1905
- Preceded by: Thomas Robson
- Succeeded by: George Neely
- Constituency: Middlesex East

Personal details
- Born: June 22, 1855 Lambeth, Canada West
- Died: January 3, 1924 (aged 68) Lambeth, Ontario
- Party: Liberal
- Spouse(s): Alice M. Best, Emily M. Morgan (m. 1917)
- Occupation: Physician

George Albert Routledge (June 22, 1855 – January 3, 1924) was a physician and politician in Ontario, Canada. He represented Middlesex East in the Legislative Assembly of Ontario from 1902 to 1905 as a Liberal.

He was born in Lambeth. Routledge practised medicine in Lambeth from 1875 to 1924. He also served as coroner for Middlesex County.

He was married twice: first to Alice M. Best and, then in 1917, to Emily M. Morgan.

Routledge died at home in Lambeth at the age of 68.

A portrait of Routledge painted by John Wycliffe Lowes Forster is part of the collection of the University of Western Ontario.
