= John McKay (Ontario politician, born 1841) =

Canadian politician

Ontario MPP
- In office 1890–1894
- Preceded by: John Saunders Cruess
- Succeeded by: Samuel John Fox
- Constituency: Victoria West

Personal details
- Born: February 12, 1841 Finch, Canada West
- Died: 1918
- Party: Liberal-Equal Rights (1890-1894); Ontario Liberal Party (1894-1898)
- Spouse: Margaret Ann McTavish (m. 1875)
- Occupation: Doctor

John McKay (February 12, 1841 – 1918) was an Ontario physician and political figure. He represented Victoria West in the Legislative Assembly of Ontario as a Liberal-Equal Rights member from 1890 to 1894 and as a Liberal member from 1894 to 1898.

He was born in Finch, Canada West in 1841, the son of James McKay, a Scottish immigrant, and was educated at Upper Canada College. He received an MD from McGill College and continued his studies in London and Edinburgh. In 1875, he married Margaret Ann McTavish. McKay lived in Woodville. He was unsuccessful in a bid for reelection in 1898 and was an unsuccessful candidate for the federal riding of Victoria North in 1900.
