= James McQueen (politician) =

Canadian politician from Ontario

Member of the Ontario Provincial Parliament for Wentworth North
- In office December 11, 1911 – May 29, 1914
- Preceded by: Gordon Crooks Wilson
- Succeeded by: Arthur Frederick Rykert

Personal details
- Party: Liberal

James McQueen was a Canadian politician from Ontario. He represented Wentworth North in the Legislative Assembly of Ontario from 1911 to 1914.

== See also ==
- 13th Parliament of Ontario
