= Robert Sutherland (Middlesex East politician) =

Canadian politician (died 1912)

Member of the Ontario Provincial Parliament for Middlesex East
- In office December 11, 1911 – July 5, 1912
- Preceded by: George Wesley Neely
- Succeeded by: George Wesley Neely

Personal details
- Party: Liberal

Robert Sutherland (died July 5, 1912) was a Canadian politician from Ontario. He represented Middlesex East in the Legislative Assembly of Ontario from 1911 to 1912.

== See also ==
- 13th Parliament of Ontario
