= John Franklin Gross =

Canadian politician

John Franklin Gross (July 19, 1859 – January 25, 1928) was a lawyer and politician in Ontario, Canada. He represented Welland in the Legislative Assembly of Ontario from 1900 to 1904 as a Liberal.

The son of John Gross and Elizabeth Barber, he was born in Clinton township. Gross taught school for a number of years and then studied law in the office of William Manley German and at Osgoode Hall. He was called to the Ontario bar in 1897 and set up practice in Welland. Gross was first elected to the provincial assembly in a by-election held after William Manley German resigned his seat to run for a seat in the Canadian House of Commons. He was reelected in 1902.

He married Clara Amelia Casper and the couple had two sons and a daughter; the daughter died while still very young.

Gross was chosen as city solicitor for Welland in 1913. He died at home in Welland in 1928.

His son Douglas later also served as solicitor for the city of Welland.
