= Middlesex East (provincial electoral district) =

Former provincial electoral district in Ontario, Canada

Ontario electoral district

Defunct provincial electoral district
- Legislature: Legislative Assembly of Ontario
- District created: 1867
- District abolished: 1925
- First contested: 1867
- Last contested: 1926

Middlesex East was an electoral riding in Ontario, Canada. It was created in 1867 at the time of confederation. It was abolished in 1925 before the 1926 election.

== Members of Provincial Parliament ==
Middlesex East
Assembly	Years	Member	Party
1st	1867–1871	James Evans	Liberal
2nd	1871–1875	Richard Tooley	Conservative
3rd	1875–1879	Richard Tooley	Conservative
4th	1879–1883	Richard Tooley	Conservative
5th	1883–1886	Donald MacKenzie	Liberal
6th	1886–1890	Richard Tooley	Conservative
7th	1890–1894	Richard Tooley	Conservative
8th	1894–1898	William Shore	Protestant Protective Association
9th	1898–1900	Thomas D. Hodgins	Conservative
9th	1900–1902	Thomas Robson	Conservative
10th	1902–1905	George Albert Routledge	Liberal
11th	1905–1908	George Wesley Neely	Conservative
12th	1908–1911	George Wesley Neely	Conservative
13th	1911–1912	Robert Sutherland	Liberal
13th	1912–1913	George Wesley Neely	Conservative
13th	1913–1914	John McFarlan	Conservative
14th	1914–1919	John McFarlan	Conservative
15th	1919–1923	John Willard Freeborn	United Farmers
16th	1923–1926	John Willard Freeborn	United Farmers
Sourced from the Ontario Legislative Assembly
Merged into Middlesex South riding after 1926

== Election results ==
1923 Ontario general election
Party	Candidate	Votes	%	±%
United Farmers	John Willard Freeborn	3,568	47.76	–4.85
Conservative	Frank Boyes	3,191	42.72	+19.40
Liberal	Richard W. Chappelle	711	9.52	–14.56
Total valid votes		7,470	99.14	
Total rejected ballots		65	0.86	–2.74
Turnout		7,535	–	–
Eligible voters				
United Farmers hold		Swing		–12.12
Source: Elections Ontario

1919 Ontario general election
Party	Candidate	Votes	%	±%
United Farmers	John Willard Freeborn	5,463	52.61	–
Liberal	Bart Robson	2,500	24.08	–21.24
Conservative	James L. Robson	2,421	23.31	–31.37
Total valid votes		10,384	96.40	
Total rejected ballots		388	3.60	+3.12
Turnout		10,772	78.19	–2.52
Eligible voters		13,776		
United Farmers gain from Conservative		Swing		–
Source: Elections Ontario

1914 Ontario general election
Party	Candidate	Votes	%	±%
Conservative	John McFarlan	2,383	54.68	+1.27
Liberal	John W. Laidlaw	1,975	45.32	–1.27
Total valid votes		4,358	99.52	
Total rejected ballots		21	0.48	+0.48
Turnout		4,379	80.72	–
Eligible voters		5,425		
Conservative hold		Swing		+1.27
Source: Elections Ontario

Ontario provincial by-election, November 27, 1913 Death of George Neely
Party	Candidate	Votes	%	±%
Conservative	John McFarlan	2,265	53.41	–3.58
Liberal	John Laidlaw	1,976	46.59	–
Total valid votes		4,241	100.00	
Total rejected ballots		–		
Turnout		4,241	–	–
Eligible voters				
Conservative hold		Swing		–
Source: Elections Ontario

Ontario provincial by-election, October 28, 1912 Death of Robert Sutherland
Party	Candidate	Votes	%	±%
Conservative	George Neely	2,198	56.99	+7.30
Independent	W. Sutherland	1,659	43.01	–
Total valid votes		3,857	99.59	
Total rejected ballots		16	0.41	–0.10
Turnout		3,873	65.90	–3.37
Eligible voters		5,877		
Conservative gain from Liberal		Swing		+3.65
Source: Elections Ontario

1911 Ontario general election
Party	Candidate	Votes	%	±%
Liberal	Robert Sutherland	2,039	50.31	+6.75
Conservative	George Neely	2,014	49.69	–6.75
Total valid votes		4,053	99.48	
Total rejected ballots		21	0.52	–0.01
Turnout		4,074	69.27	–10.01
Eligible voters		5,881		
Liberal gain from Conservative		Swing		+6.75
Source: Elections Ontario

1908 Ontario general election
Party	Candidate	Votes	%	±%
Conservative	George Neely	2,363	56.44	+4.97
Liberal	John Gilson	1,824	43.56	–4.97
Total valid votes		4,187	99.48	
Total rejected ballots		22	0.52	+0.15
Turnout		4,209	79.28	–5.87
Eligible voters		5,309		
Conservative hold		Swing		+4.97
Source: Elections Ontario

1905 Ontario general election
Party	Candidate	Votes	%	±%
Conservative	George Neely	2,463	51.46	+1.86
Liberal	George Albert Routledge	2,323	48.54	–1.49
Total valid votes		4,786	99.63	
Total rejected ballots		18	0.37	–0.07
Turnout		4,804	85.15	+4.19
Eligible voters		5,642		
Conservative gain from Liberal		Swing		+1.68
Source: Elections Ontario

1902 Ontario general election
Party	Candidate	Votes	%	±%
Liberal	George Albert Routledge	2,469	50.03	+0.46
Conservative	Thomas Robson	2,448	49.60	–0.82
Socialist	R. H. Wade	18	0.36	–
Total valid votes		4,935	99.56	
Total rejected ballots		22	0.44	+0.44
Turnout		4,957	80.96	–
Eligible voters		6,123		
Liberal gain from Conservative		Swing		+0.64
Source: Elections Ontario

Ontario provincial by-election, January 31, 1900 Death of Thomas D. Hodgins
Party	Candidate	Votes	%	±%
Conservative	Thomas Robson	2,548	50.43	–0.56
Liberal	Mr. McWilliams	2,505	49.57	+0.56
Total valid votes		5,053	100.00	
Total rejected ballots		–		
Turnout		5,053	–	–
Eligible voters				
Conservative hold		Swing		–0.56
Source: Elections Ontario

1898 Ontario general election
Party	Candidate	Votes	%	±%
Conservative	Thomas D. Hodgins	2,463	50.98	–
Liberal	Mr. McWilliams	2,368	49.02	+3.81
Total valid votes		4,831	99.44	
Total rejected ballots		27	0.56	–0.14
Turnout		4,858	77.57	+8.30
Eligible voters		6,263		
Conservative gain from Liberal-Patrons of Industry		Swing		–
Source: Elections Ontario

1894 Ontario general election
Party	Candidate	Votes	%	±%
Liberal-Patrons of Industry	William Shore	2,280	54.79	–
Liberal	R. W. Jackson	1,881	45.21	–4.21
Total valid votes		4,161	99.31	
Total rejected ballots		29	0.69	+0.17
Turnout		4,190	69.27	–4.80
Eligible voters		6,049		
Liberal-Patrons of Industry gain from Conservative		Swing		–
Source: Elections Ontario

1890 Ontario general election
Party	Candidate	Votes	%	±%
Conservative	Richard Tooley	2,508	50.58	–0.46
Liberal	T.H. Purdom	2,450	49.42	+0.46
Total valid votes		4,958	99.48	
Total rejected ballots		26	0.52	–0.63
Turnout		4,984	74.07	+3.68
Eligible voters		6,729		
Conservative hold		Swing		–0.46
Source: Elections Ontario

1886 Ontario general election
Party	Candidate	Votes	%	±%
Conservative	Richard Tooley	2,621	51.04	+1.84
Liberal	Donald MacKenzie	2,514	48.96	–1.84
Total valid votes		5,135	98.85	
Total rejected ballots		60	1.16	+0.43
Turnout		5,195	70.38	+4.37
Eligible voters		7,381		
Conservative gain from Liberal		Swing		+1.84
Source: Elections Ontario

1883 Ontario general election
Party	Candidate	Votes	%	±%
Liberal	Donald MacKenzie	2,702	50.80	+2.66
Conservative	T. Routledge	2,617	49.20	–2.66
Total valid votes		5,319	99.27	
Total rejected ballots		39	0.73	+0.73
Turnout		5,358	66.01	–0.81
Eligible voters		8,117		
Liberal gain from Conservative		Swing		+2.66
Source: Elections Ontario

1879 Ontario general election
Party	Candidate	Votes	%	±%
Conservative	Richard Tooley	2,546	51.86	−1.25
Liberal	Donald MacKenzie	2,363	48.14	+1.25
Total valid votes		4,909	66.82	−6.05
Eligible voters		7,347		
Conservative hold		Swing		−1.25
Source: Elections Ontario

1875 Ontario general election
Party	Candidate	Votes	%	±%
Conservative	Richard Tooley	2,185	53.11	+1.70
Liberal	James Evans	1,929	46.89	−1.70
Total valid votes		4,114	72.87	−2.06
Eligible voters		5,646		
Conservative hold		Swing		+1.70
Source: Elections Ontario

1871 Ontario general election
Party	Candidate	Votes	%	±%
Conservative	Richard Tooley	1,622	51.41	+1.83
Liberal	James Evans	1,533	48.59	−1.83
Turnout		3,155	74.92	−11.70
Eligible voters		4,211		
Conservative gain from Liberal		Swing		+1.83
Source: Elections Ontario

1867 Ontario general election
Party	Candidate	Votes	%
Liberal	James Evans	1,821	50.42
Conservative	Mr. Taylor	1,791	49.58
Total valid votes		3,612	86.62
Eligible voters		4,170	
Liberal pickup new district.			
Source: Elections Ontario
