= Adam Edward Vrooman =

Canadian politician (1847–1935)

Ontario MPP
- In office 1911–1914
- Preceded by: Samuel John Fox
- Succeeded by: Riding abolished
- Constituency: Victoria West

Member of Parliament for Victoria South
- In office 1900–1904
- Preceded by: George McHugh
- Succeeded by: Riding abolished

Personal details
- Born: November 7, 1847 Brock Township, Canada West
- Died: January 27, 1935 (aged 87)
- Party: Conservative
- Spouse: Mary Whiteside (m. 1873)
- Occupation: Physician

Adam Edward Vrooman (November 7, 1847 – January 27, 1935) was an Ontario physician and political figure. He represented Victoria South in the House of Commons of Canada from 1900 to 1904 and Victoria West in the Legislative Assembly of Ontario from 1911 to 1914 as a Conservative member.

He was born in Brock Township, Canada West, the son of James Vrooman, and educated in Lindsay and at Trinity University, receiving his M.D. He set up practice in Little Britain, later moving to Lindsay. In 1873, he married Mary Whiteside. Vrooman ran unsuccessfully for a federal seat in 1896. He was reeve for Mariposa Township from 1890 to 1892, warden for Victoria County in 1892 and mayor of Lindsay from 1906 to 1907. Vrooman also served as Medical Officer of Health for the township.
