= George Neely =

Canadian politician

Ontario MPP
- In office 1912–1913
- Preceded by: Robert Sutherland
- Succeeded by: John McFarlan
- In office 1905–1911
- Preceded by: George Albert Routledge
- Succeeded by: Robert Sutherland
- Constituency: Middlesex East

Personal details
- Born: September 28, 1860 North Dorchester township
- Died: October 17, 1913 (aged 53) Toronto, Ontario
- Party: Liberal
- Spouse: Sarah A. Capstick (m. 1884)
- Children: 6
- Occupation: Teacher

George Wesley Neely (September 28, 1860 – October 17, 1913) was a farmer, educator and politician in Ontario, Canada. He represented Middlesex East in the Legislative Assembly of Ontario from 1905 to 1911 and from 1912 to 1913 as a Conservative member.

The son of Irish immigrants, he was raised in North Dorchester township. Neely was educated at Ingersoll High School. He taught school for two years. In 1884, he married Sarah A. Capstick; the couple had six children. He served as reeve of North Dorchester from 1897 to 1900 and was warden for Middlesex County in 1904. He also served as secretary of the Dorchester Agricultural Society for a number of years.

He was defeated by Robert Sutherland when he ran for reelection to the Ontario assembly in 1911, but was later elected in a 1912 by-election held following Sutherland's death. He died in office the following year.
