= Samuel John Fox =

Canadian politician

John McKay

Ontario MPP
- In office 1894–1898
- Preceded by: John McKay
- Succeeded by: Adam Edward Vrooman
- Constituency: Victoria West

Personal details
- Born: September 28, 1854 Bowmanville, Canada West
- Died: July 3, 1911 (aged 56) Lindsay, Ontario
- Party: Liberal
- Spouse: Rosanna Free (m. 1877)

Samuel John Fox (September 28, 1854 – July 3, 1911) was an Ontario farmer and political figure. He represented Victoria West in the Legislative Assembly of Ontario as a Conservative member from 1898 to 1911.

He was born in Bowmanville, Canada West. He first entered the printing trade but later joined his father in brick making. Fox also became a tile maker. In 1877, he married Rosanna Free.
