= George Pattinson =

Canadian politician (1854–1931)

George Pattinson (July 15, 1854 – May 10, 1931) was an Ontario industrialist and political figure. He represented Waterloo South in the Legislative Assembly of Ontario as a Conservative member from 1905 to 1914.

He was born in Haltwhistle, Northumberland, England and grew up there. He came to Ontario in 1870, where he found work at woollen mills in Plattsville and later Preston. After the death of an owner in 1881, Pattinson became a partner in the management of the mill in Preston. In 1898, he became sole owner. He also served on the Preston town council, becoming reeve in 1889, and was a member of the local school board. Working with Sir Adam Beck on the Electrical Power Commission, he helped bring hydroelectric power from Niagara Falls to Preston. During his time in office, he also contributed to the introduction of the Ontario Workmen's Compensation Act. Pattinson was a director for the Mutual Life Assurance Company of Canada and the Economical Mutual Fire Insurance Company in Kitchener.
