= Henry George Lackner =

Canadian politician (1851–1925)

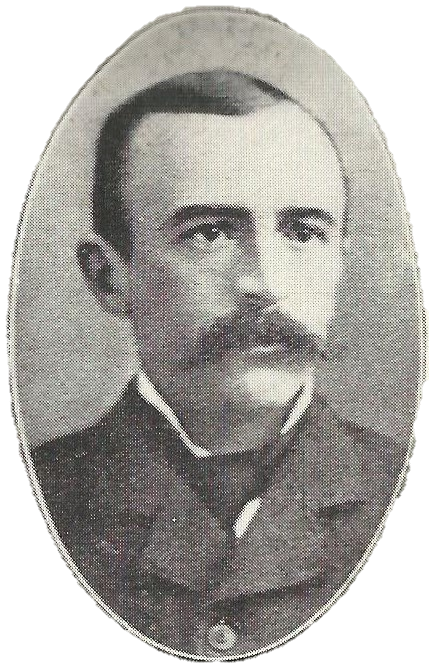
H. G. Lackner, 1912

Henry George Lackner (December 25, 1851 – December 4, 1925) was an Ontario medical doctor and political figure. He represented Waterloo North in the Legislative Assembly of Ontario as a Conservative member in 1898 and again from 1903 to 1912.

He was born in Hawkesville, Canada West, the son of William Lackner, a German immigrant. He was educated in Waterloo County and taught school for four years before going on to study at the Toronto School of Medicine. Lackner was licensed as a physician in 1876 and set up practice in Berlin (later Kitchener). In 1886, he was elected mayor and was reelected the following year and again in 1893. Lackner also served as medical health officer for Berlin. In 1880, he married Helen A. Mackie. He was elected to the provincial assembly in 1898 but unseated after an appeal and did not run in the by-election that followed; he later served four terms in the assembly. He resigned his seat in 1912 when he was named sheriff for Waterloo County; he served in that post until his death in 1925. He was buried at Mount Hope Cemetery in Kitchener.
