= 1902 Ontario general election =

Canadian provincial election

- May 29, 1902

98 seats in the 10th Legislative Assembly of Ontario 50 seats were needed for a majority
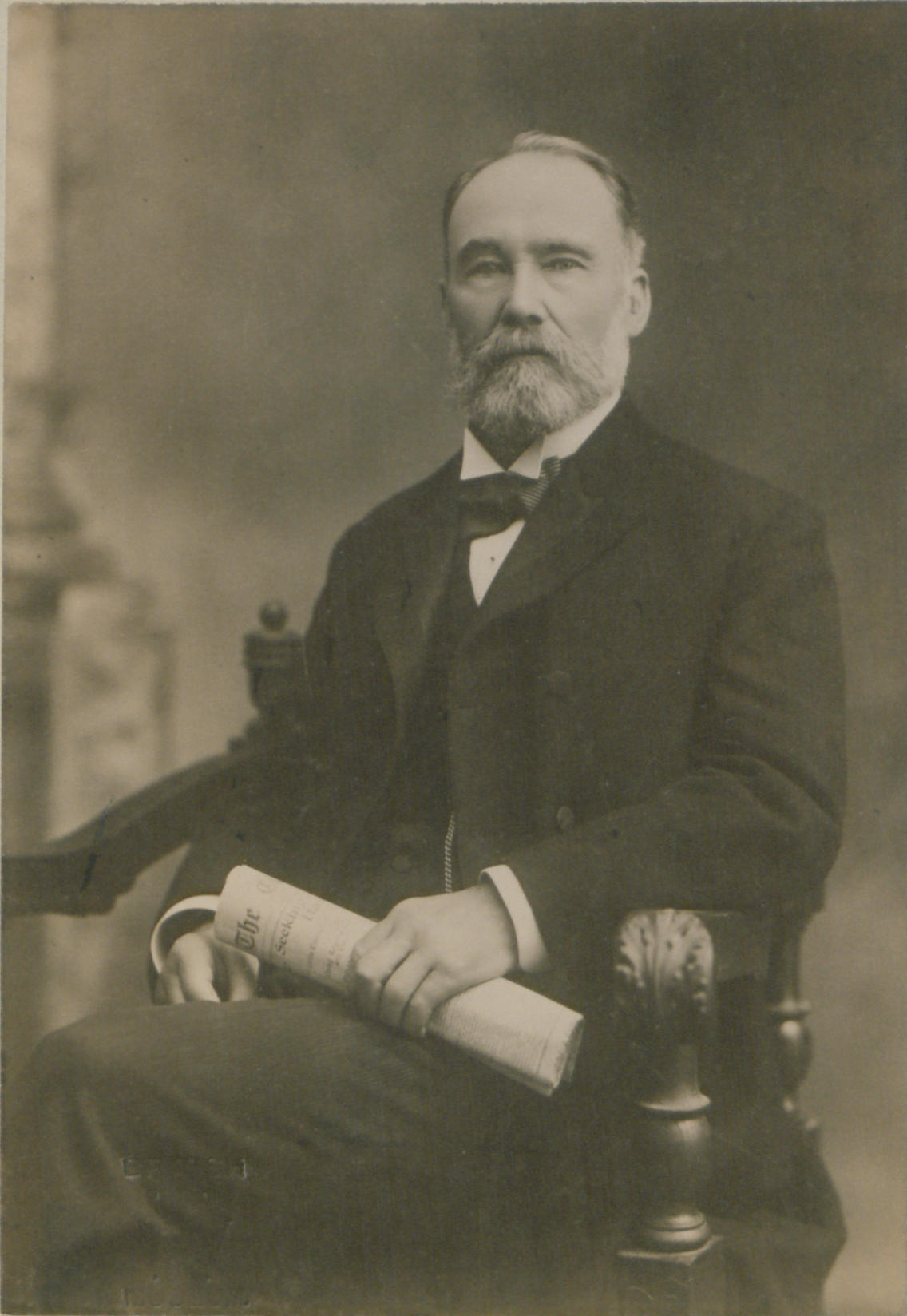

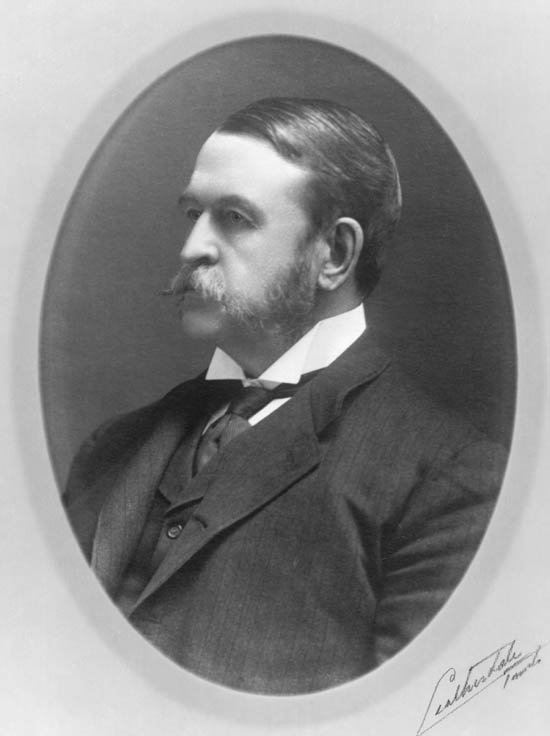
	First party	Second party
Leader	George William Ross	James P. Whitney
Party	Liberal	Conservative
Leader since	1899	1896
Leader's seat	Middlesex West	Dundas
Last election	51	42
Seats won	50	48
Seat change	▼1	▲6
Popular vote	206,709	215,883
Percentage	47.54%	49.65%
Swing	▲0.25 pp	▲1.96 pp
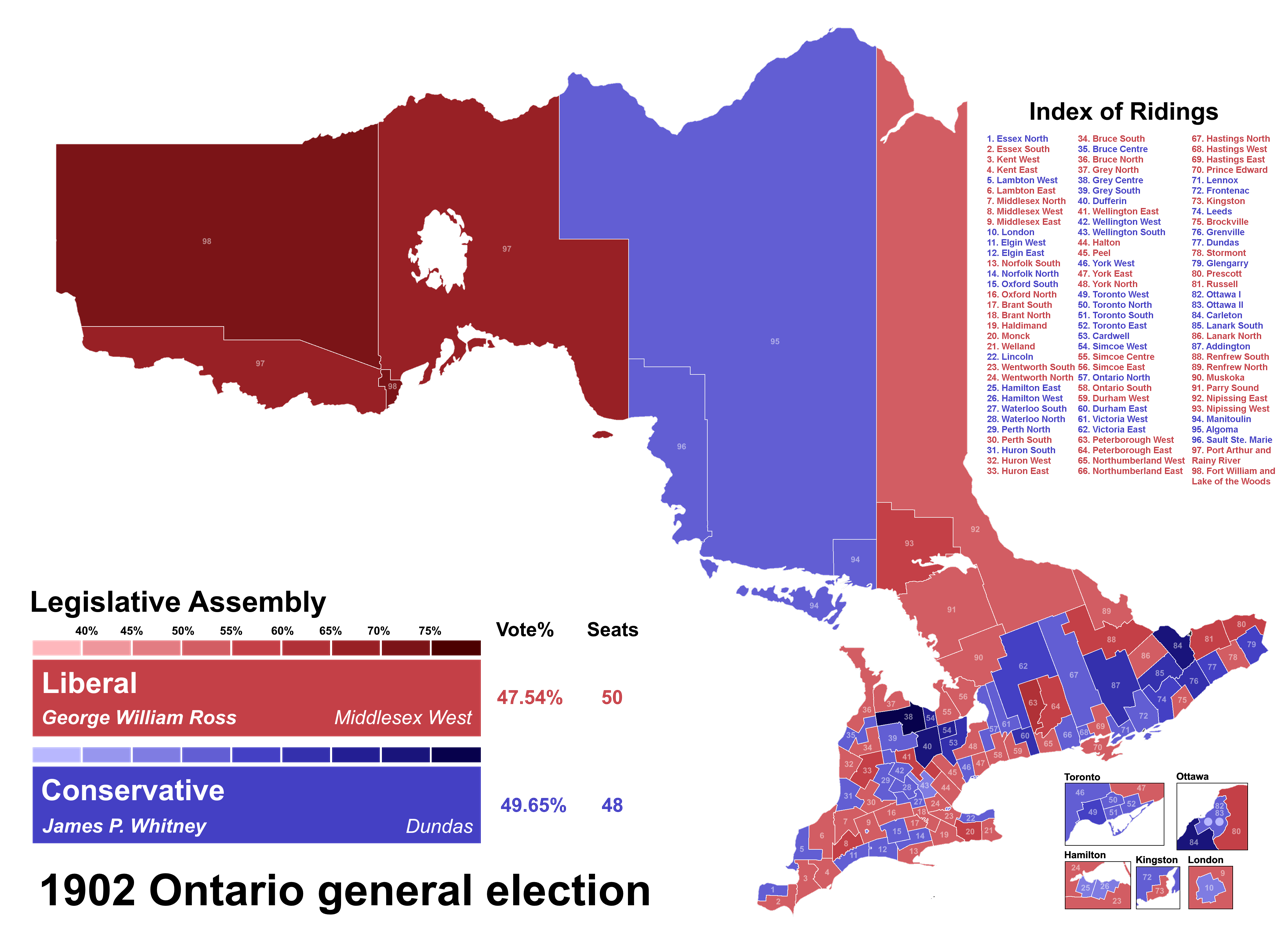
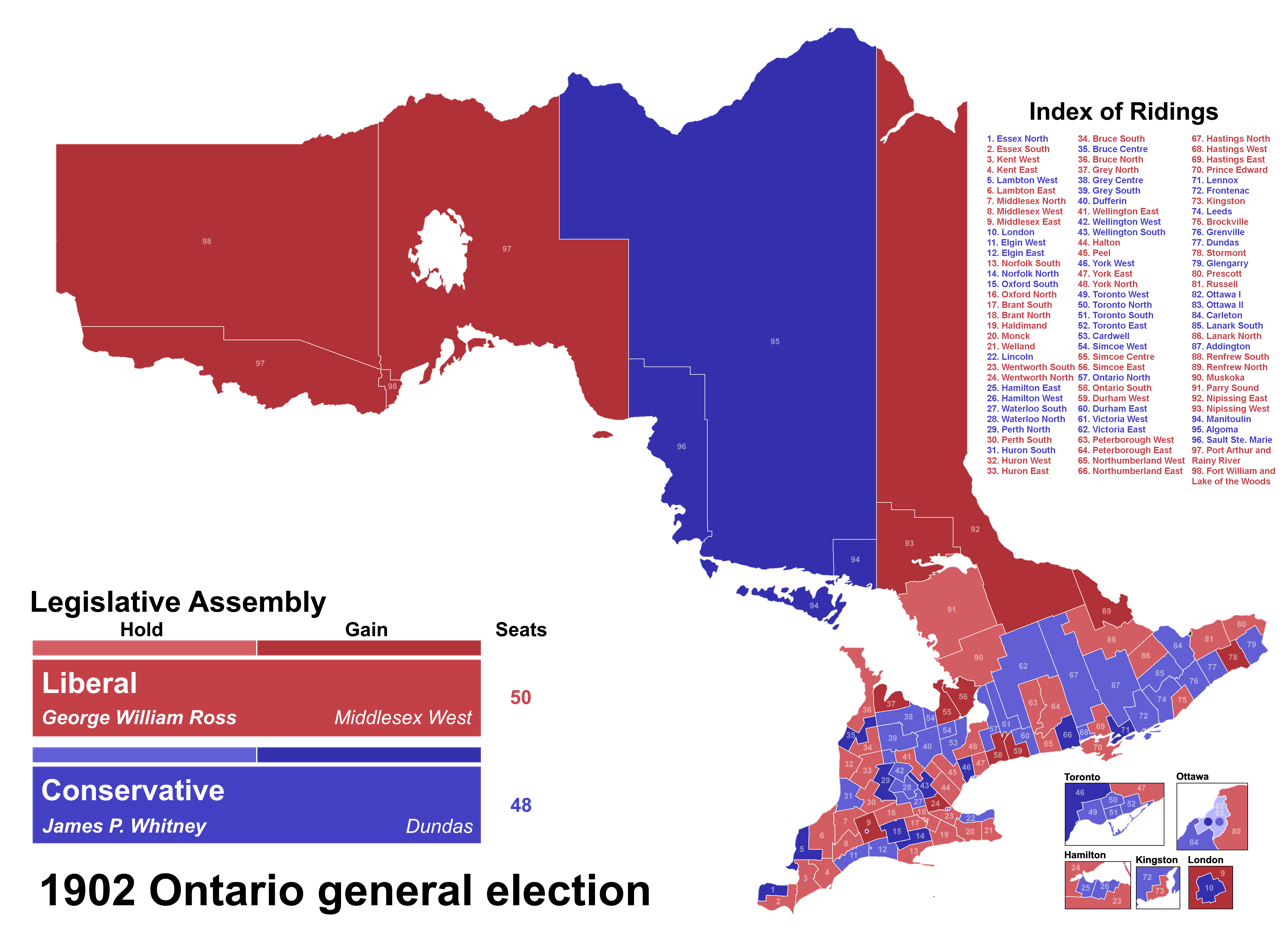
Premier before election
George William Ross
Liberal
Premier after election
George William Ross
Liberal

The 1902 Ontario general election was the tenth general election held in the province of Ontario, Canada. It was held on May 29, 1902, to elect the 98 Members of the 10th Legislative Assembly of Ontario ("MLAs").

The Ontario Liberal Party, led by Sir George William Ross, formed the government for a ninth consecutive term, although with only a very slim, two-seat majority in the legislature.

The Ontario Conservative Party, led by Sir James P. Whitney formed the official opposition.

== Expansion of the Legislative Assembly ==
The number of electoral districts was increased from 93 to 97, under an Act passed in 1902. Ottawa in both cases was entitled to elect two members, and thus 98 MLAs would now be elected to the legislature. The following electoral changes were made:

- Algoma West was divided into Fort William and Lake of the Woods and Port Arthur and Rainy River
- Algoma East was divided into Algoma, Manitoulin and Sault Ste. Marie
- Nipissing was divided into Nipissing East and Nipissing West

Ottawa had two seats, and plurality block voting was used. Elsewhere the first-past-the-post election system was used.

== Notable candidates ==
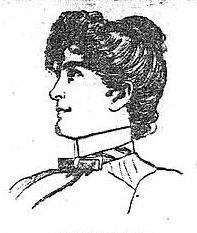
Margaret Haile

Margaret Haile, a Canadian Socialist League candidate in Toronto North, made history as the first woman ever to run for political office in Canada.

== Results ==
Elections to the 10th Parliament of Ontario (1902)
Political party	Party leader	MPPs					Votes		
Political party	Party leader	Candidates	1898	Dissol.	1902	±	#	%	± (pp)
Liberal	George William Ross	94	51		50	1▼	206,709	47.54%	0.25▲
Conservative	James P. Whitney	97	42		48	6▲	215,883	49.65%	1.96▲
Independent Conservative		2	1		–	1▼	1,646	0.38%	0.03▼
Independent		4	–	–	–		5,133	1.18%	3.42▼
Prohibitionist		6	–	–	–		3,126	0.72%	New
Socialist		9	–	–	–		1,993	0.46%	New
Socialist Labor		4	–	–	–		277	0.06%	New
Labour		1	–	–	–		Did not campaign		
Vacant									
Total		216	94	94	98		434,767	100.00%	
Blank and invalid ballots							4,021		
Registered voters / turnout							588,570	74.55%	7.50▼

Seats and popular vote by party
Party	Seats	Votes	Change (pp)
Liberal	50 / 94	47.54%	0.25
Conservative	48 / 94	49.65%	1.96
Other	0 / 94	2.81%	-2.21

=== Synopsis of results ===
Results by riding - 1902 Ontario general election
Riding (Note: excluding Ottawa, a multi-member constituency)	Winning party						Turnout	Votes					
Name (Note: order is as given in EO reports)	1898	Party	Votes	Share	Margin #	Margin %	Turnout	Lib	Con	I-Con	Ind	Oth	Total
Addington	Con	Con	1,711	60.14%	577	20.28%	59.37%	1,134	1,711	–	–	–	2,845
Algoma	New	Con	1,753	53.46%	227	6.92%	53.53%	1,526	1,753	–	–	–	3,279
Brant North	Lib	Lib	1,205	53.37%	152	6.73%	78.47%	1,205	1,053	–	–	–	2,258
Brant South	Lib	Lib	2,727	53.32%	340	6.65%	75.97%	2,727	2,387	–	–	–	5,114
Brockville	Lib	Lib	2,192	54.69%	376	9.38%	76.05%	2,192	1,816	–	–	–	4,008
Bruce Centre	Lib	Con	1,836	50.07%	5	0.14%	75.19%	1,831	1,836	–	–	–	3,667
Bruce North	Lib	Lib	2,477	52.86%	268	5.72%	76.85%	2,477	2,209	–	–	–	4,686
Bruce South	Lib	Lib	1,932	50.84%	64	1.68%	74.67%	1,932	1,868	–	–	–	3,800
Cardwell	Con	Con	2,003	62.63%	808	25.27%	56.50%	1,195	2,003	–	–	–	3,198
Carleton	I-Con	Con	1,971	72.57%	1,226	45.14%	54.68%	745	1,971	–	–	–	2,716
Dufferin	Con	Con	2,242	71.40%	1,344	42.80%	50.78%	–	2,242	–	–	898	3,140
Dundas	Con	Con	2,470	55.68%	504	11.36%	80.83%	1,966	2,470	–	–	–	4,436
Durham East	Con	Con	1,833	61.47%	684	22.94%	68.76%	1,149	1,833	–	–	–	2,982
Durham West	Con	Lib	1,706	51.32%	88	2.65%	86.05%	1,706	1,618	–	–	–	3,324
Elgin East	Con	Con	2,177	51.32%	112	2.64%	78.74%	2,065	2,177	–	–	–	4,242
Elgin West	Con	Con	3,027	50.63%	502	8.40%	77.19%	2,525	3,027	–	–	427	5,979
Essex North	Lib	Con	2,940	52.95%	328	5.91%	66.69%	2,612	2,940	–	–	–	5,552
Essex South	Lib	Lib	2,847	54.67%	486	9.33%	72.92%	2,847	2,361	–	–	–	5,208
Fort William and Lake of the Woods	New	Lib	1,483	56.95%	362	13.90%	52.78%	1,483	1,121	–	–	–	2,604
Frontenac	Con	Con	1,774	50.82%	57	1.63%	73.76%	1,717	1,774	–	–	–	3,491
Glengarry	Con	Con	2,128	56.42%	484	12.83%	69.14%	1,644	2,128	–	–	–	3,772
Grenville	Con	Con	2,261	61.74%	860	23.48%	61.11%	1,401	2,261	–	–	–	3,662
Grey Centre	Con	Con	acclaimed										
Grey North	Con	Lib	2,930	50.04%	5	0.09%	78.08%	2,930	2,925	–	–	–	5,855
Grey South	Con	Con	2,503	54.79%	438	9.59%	73.37%	2,065	2,503	–	–	–	4,568
Haldimand	Lib	Lib	1,705	52.27%	148	4.54%	71.72%	1,705	–	1,557	–	–	3,262
Halton	Lib	Lib	2,365	50.17%	16	0.34%	83.90%	2,365	2,349	–	–	–	4,714
Hamilton East	Con	Con	2,576	47.85%	143	2.66%	77.75%	2,433	2,576	–	–	375	5,384
Hamilton West	Con	Con	2,422	48.67%	152	3.05%	77.67%	2,270	2,422	89	–	195	4,976
Hastings East	Lib	Lib	1,962	50.46%	36	0.93%	82.69%	1,962	1,926	–	–	–	3,888
Hastings North	Con	Con	2,643	53.18%	316	6.36%	69.43%	2,327	2,643	–	–	–	4,970
Hastings West	Con	Con	1,884	54.66%	321	9.31%	64.34%	1,563	1,884	–	–	–	3,447
Huron East	Lib	Lib	2,299	55.63%	465	11.25%	78.18%	2,299	1,834	–	–	–	4,133
Huron South	Con	Con	2,497	50.54%	53	1.07%	83.44%	2,444	2,497	–	–	–	4,941
Huron West	Lib	Lib	2,458	50.21%	21	0.43%	80.84%	2,458	2,437	–	–	–	4,895
Kent East	Lib	Lib	2,468	50.81%	276	5.68%	66.62%	2,468	2,192	–	197	–	4,857
Kent West	Lib	Lib	3,714	51.63%	235	3.27%	76.49%	3,714	3,479	–	–	–	7,193
Kingston	Lib	Lib	2,043	51.72%	136	3.44%	86.38%	2,043	1,907	–	–	–	3,950
Lambton East	Lib	Lib	2,530	51.05%	104	2.10%	81.33%	2,530	2,426	–	–	–	4,956
Lambton West	Lib	Con	3,847	51.01%	152	2.02%	77.13%	3,695	3,847	–	–	–	7,542
Lanark North	Lib	Lib	1,811	51.13%	80	2.26%	81.79%	1,811	1,731	–	–	–	3,542
Lanark South	Con	Con	2,098	63.60%	897	27.19%	83.98%	1,201	2,098	–	–	–	3,299
Leeds	Con	Con	2,062	57.04%	509	14.08%	65.19%	1,553	2,062	–	–	–	3,615
Lennox	Lib	Con	1,566	50.05%	3	0.10%	77.89%	1,563	1,566	–	–	–	3,129
Lincoln	Con	Con	3,199	54.34%	695	11.81%	81.07%	2,504	3,199	–	–	184	5,887
London	Lib	Con	3,445	45.06%	131	1.71%	82.15%	3,314	3,445	–	–	887	7,646
Manitoulin	New	Con	1,214	51.90%	339	14.49%	44.31%	875	1,214	–	250	–	2,339
Middlesex East	Con	Lib	2,469	50.03%	21	0.43%	80.96%	2,469	2,448	–	–	18	4,935
Middlesex North	Lib	Lib	2,173	52.44%	202	4.87%	79.07%	2,173	1,971	–	–	–	4,144
Middlesex West	Lib	Lib	2,172	58.07%	604	16.15%	73.32%	2,172	1,568	–	–	–	3,740
Monck	Lib	Lib	1,876	55.14%	350	10.29%	78.25%	1,876	1,526	–	–	–	3,402
Muskoka	Lib	Lib	2,089	51.05%	86	2.10%	72.15%	2,089	2,003	–	–	–	4,092
Nipissing East	New	Lib	1,218	54.57%	204	9.14%	50.26%	1,218	1,014	–	–	–	2,232
Nipissing West	New	Lib	1,185	55.69%	242	11.37%	51.26%	1,185	943	–	–	–	2,128
Norfolk North	Lib	Con	1,704	50.34%	23	0.68%	80.13%	1,681	1,704	–	–	–	3,385
Norfolk South	Lib	Lib	1,723	51.11%	75	2.22%	83.15%	1,723	1,648	–	–	–	3,371
Northumberland East	Lib	Con	2,538	52.95%	283	5.90%	78.02%	2,255	2,538	–	–	–	4,793
Northumberland West	Lib	Lib	1,606	53.50%	210	7.00%	82.64%	1,606	1,396	–	–	–	3,002
Ontario North	Con	Con	2,219	52.17%	185	4.35%	82.20%	2,034	2,219	–	–	–	4,253
Ontario South	Con	Lib	2,632	51.29%	132	2.57%	82.99%	2,632	2,500	–	–	–	5,132
Oxford North	Lib	Lib	2,254	50.79%	1,124	25.33%	65.26%	2,254	1,054	–	1,130	–	4,438
Oxford South	Lib	Con	2,043	52.21%	173	4.42%	58.76%	1,870	2,043	–	–	–	3,913
Parry Sound	Lib	Lib	2,490	53.40%	317	6.80%	41.45%	2,490	2,173	–	–	–	4,663
Peel	Lib	Lib	2,296	51.38%	123	2.75%	81.64%	2,296	2,173	–	–	–	4,469
Perth North	Lib	Con	3,292	50.02%	2	0.03%	83.90%	3,290	3,292	–	–	–	6,582
Perth South	Lib	Lib	2,486	50.72%	71	1.45%	81.35%	2,486	2,415	–	–	–	4,901
Peterborough East	Lib	Lib	2,067	56.00%	443	12.00%	76.07%	2,067	1,624	–	–	–	3,691
Peterborough West	Lib	Lib	2,849	63.25%	1,194	26.51%	79.43%	2,849	1,655	–	–	–	4,504
Port Arthur and Rainy River	New	Lib	1,124	66.55%	559	33.10%	46.06%	1,124	565	–	–	–	1,689
Prescott	Lib	Lib	2,341	59.51%	748	19.01%	64.13%	2,341	1,593	–	–	–	3,934
Prince Edward	Con	Lib	2,273	51.31%	116	2.62%	82.05%	2,273	2,157	–	–	–	4,430
Renfrew North	Con	Lib	2,565	54.91%	459	9.83%	82.46%	2,565	2,106	–	–	–	4,671
Renfrew South	Lib	Lib	2,676	59.76%	874	19.52%	69.19%	2,676	1,802	–	–	–	4,478
Russell	Lib	Lib	2,536	59.46%	807	18.92%	53.44%	2,536	1,729	–	–	–	4,265
Sault Ste. Marie	New	Con	1,359	53.95%	199	7.90%	51.69%	1,160	1,359	–	–	–	2,519
Simcoe Centre	Con	Lib	1,857	50.60%	44	1.20%	75.49%	1,857	1,813	–	–	–	3,670
Simcoe East	Con	Lib	3,365	53.56%	447	7.11%	78.41%	3,365	2,918	–	–	–	6,283
Simcoe West	Con	Con	1,734	69.89%	987	39.78%	46.15%	–	1,734	–	–	747	2,481
Stormont	Con	Lib	2,807	53.59%	376	7.18%	75.10%	2,807	2,431	–	–	–	5,238
Toronto East	Con	Con	3,136	54.07%	922	15.90%	56.73%	2,214	3,136	–	–	450	5,800
Toronto North	Con	Con	3,838	51.19%	282	3.76%	56.62%	–	3,838	–	3,556	104	7,498
Toronto South	Con	Con	5,072	52.41%	730	7.54%	59.15%	4,342	5,072	–	–	263	9,677
Toronto West	Con	Con	4,267	58.19%	1,545	21.07%	51.24%	2,722	4,267	–	–	344	7,333
Victoria East	Con	Con	2,390	56.81%	573	13.62%	77.02%	1,817	2,390	–	–	–	4,207
Victoria West	Con	Con	2,234	51.13%	99	2.27%	78.23%	2,135	2,234	–	–	–	4,369
Waterloo North	Con	Con	2,848	52.45%	266	4.90%	74.34%	2,582	2,848	–	–	–	5,430
Waterloo South	Con	Con	2,782	50.90%	98	1.79%	72.48%	2,684	2,782	–	–	–	5,466
Welland	Lib	Lib	2,851	51.00%	112	2.00%	77.12%	2,851	2,739	–	–	–	5,590
Wellington East	Lib	Lib	2,071	56.16%	454	12.31%	70.49%	2,071	1,617	–	–	–	3,688
Wellington South	Lib	Con	2,341	48.09%	227	4.66%	75.87%	2,114	2,341	–	–	413	4,868
Wellington West	Con	Con	1,786	51.48%	103	2.97%	74.28%	1,683	1,786	–	–	–	3,469
Wentworth North	Con	Lib	1,410	50.87%	48	1.73%	71.32%	1,410	1,362	–	–	–	2,772
Wentworth South	Lib	Lib	1,526	53.66%	299	10.51%	78.83%	1,526	1,227	–	–	91	2,844
York East	Lib	Lib	1,905	54.62%	322	9.23%	67.28%	1,905	1,583	–	–	–	3,488
York North	Lib	Lib	2,828	51.90%	207	3.80%	84.94%	2,828	2,621	–	–	–	5,449
York West	Lib	Con	2,802	54.04%	419	8.08%	76.55%	2,383	2,802	–	–	–	5,185

= open seat
= turnout is above provincial average
= winning candidate was in previous Legislature
= incumbent had switched allegiance
= previously incumbent in another riding
= not incumbent; was previously elected to the Legislature
= incumbency arose from byelection gain
= incumbency arose from prior election result being overturned by the court
= other incumbents renominated
= previously an MP in the House of Commons of Canada
= multiple candidates

Results for Ottawa (2 seats)
Political party	Candidate	Votes	%	Elected	Incumbent
Conservative	Dennis Murphy	5,770	27.15	✓	
Conservative	Charles Berkeley Powell	5,633	26.50	✓	✓
Liberal	S. Bingham	5,154	24.25		
Liberal	Alexander Lumsden	4,698	22.10	✗	✓
Majority (Note: plurality for third winning candidate)		479	2.25		
Turnout		11,247	71.85		
Registered voters		15,653			

=== Analysis ===
Party candidates in 2nd place (Note: excluding Ottawa seats)
Party in 1st place	Party in 2nd place						Total
Party in 1st place	Accl	Lib	Con	I-Con	Proh	Ind	Total
Liberal			48	1		1	50
Conservative	1	42			2	1	46
Total	1	42	48	1	2	2	96

Candidates ranked 1st to 4th place, by party
Parties	Accl	1st	2nd	3rd	4th
█ Liberal		50	42	1	1
█ Conservative	1	46	49	1	
█ Prohibitionist			2	4	
█ Independent			2	2	
█ Independent Conservative			1		1
█ Socialist				8	1
█ Socialist Labor					4

Resulting composition of the 10th Legislative Assembly of Ontario
Source		Party		
Source		Lib	Con	Total
Seats retained	Incumbents returned	30	23	53
Seats retained	Returned by acclamation		1	1
Seats retained	Open seats held	5	4	9
Seats retained	Byelection losses reversed	1	1	2
Seats retained	Ouster of incumbent changing allegiance		2	2
Seats changing hands	Incumbents defeated	6	8	14
Seats changing hands	Open seats gained	2	3	5
Seats changing hands	Byelection gains held	2		2
Seats changing hands	Incumbent changing allegiance		1	1
Ottawa seats	New MLA		1	1
Ottawa seats	Incumbent defeated		1	1
New seats	New MLA	3	2	5
New seats	Previously incumbent in another riding	1	1	2
Total		50	48	98

=== MLAs elected by region and riding ===
Party designations are as follows:

Liberal
Conservative

Northern Ontario

- Algoma: William Ross Smyth
- Fort William and Lake of the Woods: Douglas Colin Cameron
- Manitoulin: Robert Roswell Gamey
- Nipissing East: Michael James
- Nipissing West: Joseph Michaud
- Port Arthur and Rainy River: James Conmee
- Sault Ste. Marie: Andrew Miscampbell (Note: Election declared void because of corrupt practices. Writ for new election issued. Charles Napier Smith (Liberal) was reelected in the subsequent byelection.)

Ottawa Valley

- Carleton: George Nelson Kidd
- Lanark North: William Clyde Caldwell
- Lanark South: Arthur James Matheson
- Ottawa: Dennis Murphy
- Ottawa: Charles Berkeley Powell
- Prescott: Alfred Évanturel
- Renfrew North: John W. Munro (Note: Munro died two days after Election Day. Writ for new election issued. Edward Arunah Dunlop (Conservative) was elected in the subsequent byelection.)
- Renfrew South: Francis Robert Latchford
- Russell: Onésime Guibord

Saint Lawrence Valley

- Brockville: George Perry Graham
- Dundas: James Pliny Whitney
- Glengarry: William Duncan McLeod
- Grenville: Robert L. Joynt
- Kingston: William Harty
- Leeds: Walter Beatty
- Stormont: William John McCart

Central Ontario

- Addington: James Reid
- Durham East: Josiah Johnston Preston
- Durham West: William Rickard
- Frontenac: John S. Gallagher
- Hastings East: Samuel Russell
- Hastings North: Josiah Williams Pearce
- Hastings West: Marshall Bidwell Morrison
- Lennox: Thomas George Carscallen
- Northumberland East: William Arnson Willoughby
- Northumberland West: Samuel Clarke
- Peterborough East: William A. Anderson
- Peterborough West: James Robert Stratton
- Prince Edward: Morley Currie
- Victoria East: John Hilliard Carnegie
- Victoria West: Samuel John Fox

Georgian Bay

- Bruce North: Charles Martin Bowman
- Grey North: Alexander Grant MacKay (Note: Election declared void because of corrupt practices. Writ for new election issued. McKay was reelected in the subsequent byelection.)
- Muskoka: Samuel Bridgeland
- Parry Sound: Joseph Milton Carr
- Simcoe Centre: David Davidson
- Simcoe East: James Brockett Tudhope
- Simcoe West: James Stoddart Duff

Wentworth/Halton/Niagara

- Halton: John Roaf Barber
- Hamilton East: Henry Carscallen
- Hamilton West: John Strathearn Hendrie
- Lincoln: Elisha Jessop
- Monck: Richard Harcourt
- Welland: John Franklin Gross
- Wentworth North: Robert Adam Thompson
- Wentworth South: John Dickenson

Midwestern Ontario

- Brant North: Daniel Burt
- Brant South: Thomas Hiram Preston
- Bruce Centre: Hugh Clark (Note: Election declared void because of corrupt practices. Writ for new election issued. Clark was reelected in the subsequent byelection.)
- Bruce South: Reuben Eldridge Truax
- Dufferin: John Barr
- Grey Centre: Isaac Benson Lucas
- Grey South: David Jamieson
- Haldimand: Joseph William Holmes
- Huron East: Archibald Hislop
- Huron South: Henry Eilber
- Huron West: Malcolm Graeme Cameron
- Norfolk North: Frederick Snider (Note: Election declared void because of corrupt practices. Writ for new election issued. Archibald Little (Liberal) was elected in the subsequent byelection.)
- Norfolk South: William Andrew Charlton
- Oxford North: Andrew Pattulo
- Oxford South: Donald Sutherland
- Perth North: John C. Monteith (Note: Election determined to have ended in a tie vote, and was thus declared void. Writ for new election issued. John Brown (Liberal) was elected in the subsequent byelection.)
- Perth South: Valentine Stock
- Waterloo North: Henry George Lackner
- Waterloo South: William Abram Kribs
- Wellington East: John Morison Gibson
- Wellington South: Joseph Patrick Downey
- Wellington West: James Tucker

Southwestern Ontario

- Elgin East: Charles Andrew Brower
- Elgin West: Findlay George MacDiarmid
- Essex North: Joseph Octave Reaume
- Essex South: John Allan Auld
- Kent East: John Lee
- Kent West: Thomas Letson Pardo
- Lambton East: Henry John Pettypiece
- Lambton West: William John Hanna
- London: Adam Beck
- Middlesex East: George Albert Routledge
- Middlesex North: William Taylor
- Middlesex West: George William Ross

Peel/York/Ontario

- Cardwell: Edward Alfred Little
- Ontario North: William Henry Hoyle
- Ontario South: John Dryden
- Peel: John Smith
- York East: John Richardson
- York North: Elihu James Davis (Note: Davis resigned in exchange for withdrawal of election petition. Writ for new election issued. He was reelected in the subsequent byelection.)
- York West: Joseph Wesley St. John

Toronto

- Toronto East: Robert Allan Pyne
- Toronto North: William Beattie Nesbitt
- Toronto South: J.J. Foy
- Toronto West: Thomas Crawford

=== Division of ridings ===
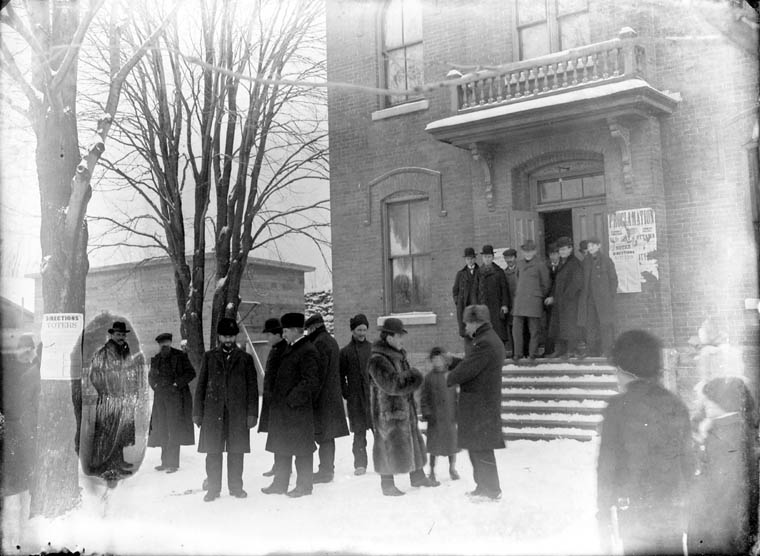
Voters go to the polls in Ottawa East

The newly created ridings returned the following MLAs:

1898			1902
Riding	Party	Riding	Party
Algoma West	█ Liberal	Fort William and Lake of the Woods	█ Liberal
Algoma West	█ Liberal	Port Arthur and Rainy River	█ Liberal
Algoma East	█ Liberal	Algoma	█ Conservative
Algoma East	█ Liberal	Manitoulin	█ Conservative
Algoma East	█ Liberal	Sault Ste. Marie	█ Conservative
Nipissing	█ Liberal	Nipissing East	█ Liberal
Nipissing	█ Liberal	Nipissing West	█ Liberal

=== Seats that changed hands ===
Elections to the 8th Parliament of Ontario – unaltered seats won/lost by party, 1898–1902
Party	1898	Gain from (loss to)						1902
Party	1898	Lib		Con		I-Con		1902
Liberal	48			10	(12)			46
Conservative	42	12	(10)			1		45
Independent-Conservative	1				(1)			–
Total	91	12	(10)	10	(13)	1	–	91

Of the constituencies that were not altered, there were 23 seats that changed allegiance in the election:

Liberal to Conservative

- Bruce Centre
- Essex North
- Lambton West
- Lennox
- London
- Norfolk North
- Northumberland East
- Ottawa (2nd MLA)
- Oxford South
- Perth North
- Wellington South
- York West

Conservative to Liberal

- Durham West
- Grey North
- Middlesex East
- Ontario South
- Prince Edward
- Renfrew North
- Simcoe Centre
- Simcoe East
- Stormont
- Wentworth North

Independent-Conservative to Conservative

- Carleton

== See also ==
- Politics of Ontario
- List of Ontario political parties
- Premier of Ontario
- Leader of the Opposition (Ontario)
