= 10th Parliament of Ontario =

The 10th Legislative Assembly of Ontario was in session from May 29, 1902, until December 13, 1904, just prior to the 1905 general election. The majority party was the Ontario Liberal Party led by George William Ross.

William Andrew Charlton served as speaker for the assembly.

== Members of the Assembly ==
Italicized names indicate members returned by acclamation.

Riding	Member	Party	First elected / previously elected	No. of terms
Addington	James Reid	Conservative	1890	4th term
Algoma	William Ross Smyth	Conservative	1902	1st term
Brant	Daniel Burt	Liberal	1895	3rd term
Brant South	Thomas Hiram Preston	Liberal	1899	2nd term
Brockville	George Perry Graham	Liberal	1898	2nd term
Bruce Centre	Hugh Clark	Conservative	1902	1st term
Bruce North	Charles Martin Bowman	Liberal	1898	2nd term
Bruce South	Reuben Eldridge Truax	Liberal	1894	3rd term
Cardwell	Edward Alfred Little	Conservative	1894	3rd term
Carleton	George Nelson Kidd	Conservative	1894	3rd term
Dufferin	John Barr	Conservative	1875, 1890, 1898	5th term*
Dundas	James Pliny Whitney	Conservative	1888	5th term
Durham East	Josiah Johnston Preston	Conservative	1902	1st term
Durham West	William Rickard	Liberal	1902	1st term
Elgin East	Charles Andrew Brower	Conservative	1894	3rd term
Elgin West	Findlay George MacDiarmid	Conservative	1898, 1900	3rd term*
Essex North	Joseph Octave Reaume	Conservative	1902	1st term
Essex South	John Allan Auld	Liberal	1896	3rd term
Fort William and Lake of the Woods	Douglas Colin Cameron	Liberal	1902	1st term
Frontenac	John S. Gallagher	Conservative	1898	2nd term
Glengarry	William Duncan McLeod	Conservative	1902	1st term
Grenville	Robert L. Joynt	Conservative	1898	2nd term
Grey Centre	Isaac Benson Lucas	Conservative	1898	2nd term
Grey North	Alexander Grant MacKay	Liberal	1902	1st term
Grey South	David Jamieson	Conservative	1898	2nd term
Haldimand	Joseph William Holmes	Liberal	1898	2nd term
Halton	John Roaf Barber	Liberal	1898	2nd term
Hamilton East	Henry Carscallen	Conservative	1898	2nd term
Hamilton West	John Strathearn Hendrie	Conservative	1902	1st term
Hastings East	Samuel Russell	Liberal	1898	2nd term
Hastings North	Josiah Williams Pearce	Conservative	1902	1st term
Hastings West	Marshall Bidwell Morrison	Conservative	1898	2nd term
Huron East	Archibald Hislop	Liberal	1898	2nd term
Huron South	Henry Eilber	Conservative	1898	2nd term
Huron West	Malcolm Graeme Cameron	Liberal	1902	1st term
Kent East	John Lee	Liberal	1901	2nd term
Kent West	Thomas Letson Pardo	Liberal	1894	3rd term
Kingston	Edward John Barker Pense	Liberal	1901	2nd term
Lambton East	Henry John Pettypiece	Liberal	1898	2nd term
Lambton West	William John Hanna	Conservative	1902	1st term
Lanark North	William Clyde Caldwell	Liberal	1872, 1879, 1888, 1898	7th term*
Lanark South	Arthur James Matheson	Conservative	1894	3rd term
Leeds	Walter Beatty	Conservative	1894	3rd term
Lennox	Thomas George Carscallen	Conservative	1902	1st term
Lincoln	Elisha Jessop	Conservative	1898	2nd term
London	Adam Beck	Conservative	1902	1st term
Manitoulin	Robert Roswell Gamey	Conservative	1902	1st term
Middlesex East	George Albert Routledge	Liberal	1902	1st term
Middlesex North	William Henry Taylor	Liberal	1894	3rd term
Middlesex West	George William Ross	Liberal	1883	6th term
Monck	Richard Harcourt	Liberal	1879	7th term
Muskoka	Samuel Bridgeland (Note: died in 1903)	Liberal	1898	2nd term
Muskoka	Arthur Arnold Mahaffy (1903)	Conservative	1903	1st term
Nipissing East	Michael James	Liberal	1902	1st term
Nipissing West	Joseph Michaud	Liberal	1902	1st term
Norfolk North	Frederick S. Snider	Conservative	1902	1st term
Norfolk North	Archibald Little (1903)	Liberal	1903	1st term
Norfolk South	William Andrew Charlton	Liberal	1890	4th term
Northumberland East	William Arnson Willoughby	Conservative	1886, 1888, 1902	5th term*
Northumberland West	Samuel Clarke	Liberal	1898	2nd term
Ontario North	William Henry Hoyle	Conservative	1898	2nd term
Ontario South	John Dryden	Liberal	1879, 1899	7th term*
Ottawa (Note: Ottawa had 2 seats)	Charles Berkeley Powell	Conservative	1898	2nd term
Ottawa	Dennis Murphy	Conservative	1902	1st term
Oxford North	Andrew Pattulo	Liberal	1896	3rd term
Oxford North	James S. Munro (1904)	Liberal	1904	1st term
Oxford South	Donald Sutherland	Conservative	1902	1st term
Parry Sound	Joseph Milton Carr	Liberal	1902	1st term
Peel	John Smith	Liberal	1892	4th term
Perth North	John C. Monteith (Note: unseated after an appeal)	Conservative	1902	1st term
Perth North	John Brown (1903)	Liberal	1898, 1903	2nd term*
Perth South	Valentine Stock	Liberal	1902	1st term
Peterborough East	William A. Anderson	Liberal	1902	1st term
Peterborough West	James Robert Stratton	Liberal	1886	5th term
Port Arthur and Rainy River	James Conmee	Liberal	1885, 1895	6th term*
Prescott	Francis Eugene Alfred Evanturel	Liberal	1886	5th term
Prince Edward	Morley Currie	Liberal	1902	1st term
Renfrew North	John W. Munro	Liberal	1900	2nd term
Renfrew North	Edward Arunah Dunlop (1903)	Conservative	1903	1st term
Renfrew South	Francis Robert Latchford	Liberal	1899	2nd term
Russell	Onésime Guibord	Liberal	1898	2nd term
Sault Ste. Marie	Andrew Miscampbell	Conservative	1890	4th term
Sault Ste. Marie	Charles Napier Smith (1903)	Liberal	1903	1st term
Simcoe Centre	David Davidson	Liberal	1902	1st term
Simcoe East	James Brockett Tudhope	Liberal	1902	1st term
Simcoe West	James Stoddart Duff	Conservative	1898	2nd term
Stormont	William John McCart	Liberal	1902	1st term
Toronto East	Robert Allan Pyne	Conservative	1898	2nd term
Toronto North	William Beattie Nesbitt	Conservative	1902	1st term
Toronto South	J.J. Foy	Conservative	1898	2nd term
Toronto West	Thomas Crawford	Conservative	1894	3rd term
Victoria East	John Hilliard Carnegie	Conservative	1894	3rd term
Victoria West	Samuel John Fox	Conservative	1898	2nd term
Waterloo North	Henry George Lackner	Conservative	1898, 1902	2nd term*
Waterloo South	William Abram Kribs	Conservative	1898	2nd term
Welland	John Franklin Gross	Liberal	1900	2nd term
Wellington East	John Morison Gibson	Liberal	1879, (Note: Hamilton) 1891, (Note: Hamilton West) 1899	7th term*
Wellington South	Joseph Patrick Downey	Conservative	1902	1st term
Wellington West	James Tucker	Conservative	1896	3rd term
Wentworth North	Robert Adam Thompson	Liberal	1902	1st term
Wentworth South	John Dickenson	Liberal	1896	3rd term
York East	John Richardson	Liberal	1894	3rd term
York North	Elihu James Davis	Liberal	1888	5th term
York West	Joseph Wesley St. John	Conservative	1894, 1902	2nd term*

== Timeline ==
10th Legislative Assembly of Ontario - Movement in seats held (1902-1905)
Party	1902	Gain/(loss) due to				1905
Party	1902	Void election	Death in office	Byelection gain	Byelection hold	1905
Liberal	50		(3)	3	1	51
Conservative	48	(3)		2		47
Total	98	(3)	(3)	5	1	98

Changes in seats held (1902–1905)
Seat	Before				Change		
Seat	Date	Member	Party	Reason	Date	Member	Party
Renfrew North	May 31, 1902	John W. Munro	█ Liberal	Died in office	December 26, 1903	Edward Arunah Dunlop	█ Conservative
Perth North	November 6, 1902	John C. Monteith	█ Conservative	Resignation in exchange for withdrawal of election petition	January 7, 1903	John Brown	█ Liberal
Norfolk North	November 13, 1902	Frederick Snider	█ Conservative	Election declared void	January 7, 1903	Archibald Little	█ Liberal
Muskoka	May 6, 1903	Samuel Bridgeland	█ Liberal	Died in office	October 27, 1903	Arthur Arnold Mahaffy	█ Conservative
Sault Ste. Marie	May 18, 1903	Andrew Miscampbell	█ Conservative	Election declared void	October 27, 1903	Charles Napier Smith	█ Liberal
Oxford North	December 29, 1903	Andrew Pattulo	█ Liberal	Died in office	January 26, 1904	James S. Munro	█ Liberal

Re-elections on seats being vacated (1902–1905)
Seat	Incumbent	Party	Vacated	Reason	By-election
Grey North	Alexander Grant MacKay	█ Liberal	November 21, 1902	Election declared void	January 7, 1903
York North	Elihu James Davis	█ Liberal	February 6, 1903	Resignation in exchange for withdrawal of election petition	February 26, 1903
Bruce Centre	Hugh Clark	█ Conservative	February 6, 1903	Election declared void	February 26, 1903
