= 1898 Ontario general election =

Canadian provincial election

- March 1, 1898

94 seats in the 9th Legislative Assembly of Ontario 48 seats were needed for a majority
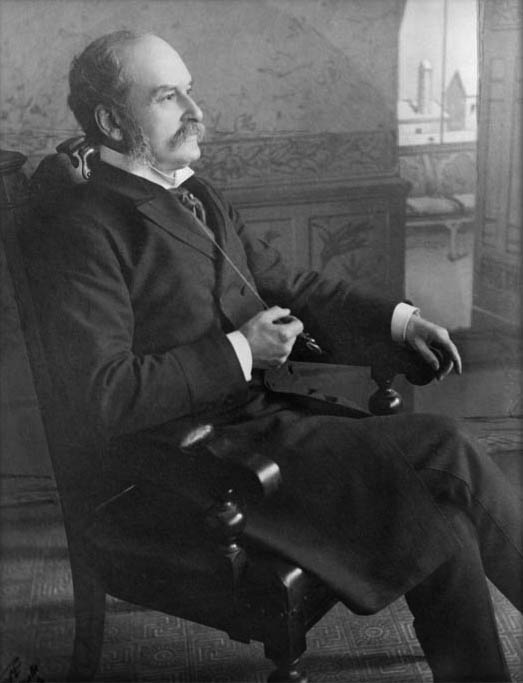

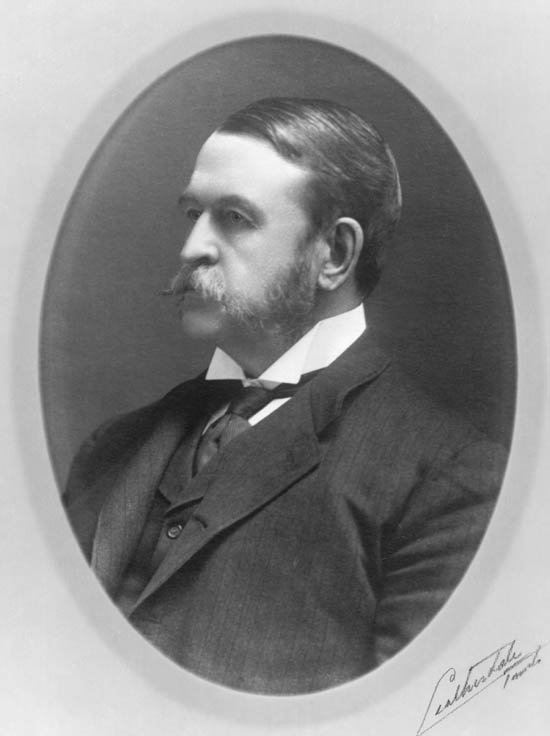
	First party	Second party
Leader	Arthur S. Hardy	James P. Whitney
Party	Liberal	Conservative
Leader since	1896	1896
Leader's seat	Brant South	Dundas
Last election	45	23
Seats won	51	42
Seat change	▲6	▲19
Premier before election
Arthur S. Hardy
Liberal
Premier after election
Arthur S. Hardy
Liberal

The 1898 Ontario general election was the ninth general election held in the province of Ontario, Canada. It was held on March 1, 1898, to elect the 94 Members of the 9th Legislative Assembly of Ontario ("MLAs").

The Ontario Liberal Party, led by Arthur S. Hardy, won an eighth term in office with a clear majority – the Patrons of Industry and the Protestant Protective Association held no sway in this legislature.

The Ontario Conservative Party, led by Sir James P. Whitney, formed the official opposition.

Ottawa had two seats, and plurality block voting was used. Elsewhere the first-past-the-post election system was used.

== Results ==
Elections to the 9th Parliament of Ontario (1898)
Political party	Party leader	MPPs					Votes		
Political party	Party leader	Candidates	1894	Dissol.	1898	±	#	%	± (pp)
Liberal	Arthur S. Hardy	91	45		51	6▲	202,332	47.29%	6.30▲
Conservative	James P. Whitney	90	23		42	19▲	204,011	47.69%	19.88▲
Independent-Conservative		1	–		1	1▲	1,740	0.41%	New
Liberal-Patrons		–	12		–	12▼	Did not campaign		
Conservative–P.P.A.		–	5		–	5▼	Did not campaign		
Patrons of Industry	Joseph Longford Haycock	–	3		–	3▼	Did not campaign		
Conservative-Patrons		–	2		–	2▼	Did not campaign		
Liberal-P.P.A.		–	2		–	2▼	Did not campaign		
Protestant Protective Association		–	1		–	1▼	Did not campaign		
Independent-Conservative-PPA		–	1		–	1▼	Did not campaign		
Independent		18	–	–	–		19,683	4.60%	2.10▲
Labour		1	–	–	–		57	0.01%	New
Vacant									
Total		201	94	94	94		427,823	100.00%	
Blank and invalid ballots							3,601		
Registered voters / turnout							525,795	82.05%	11.75▲

Seats and popular vote by party of major influence
Party	Seats	Votes	Change (pp)
Liberal (Note: Straight party support only. Other MLAs sponsored by Patrons of Industry, PPA or Equal Rights Party are allocated to the latter, to show extent of influence.)	51 / 94	47.29%	6.30
Conservative	42 / 94	47.69%	19.88
Patrons of Industry	0 / 94	0.00%	-17.61
Protestant Protective Association (Note: Associated with the Orange Order.)	0 / 94	0.00%	-11.09
Other	1 / 94	5.02%	2.52

=== Synopsis of results ===
Results by riding - 1898 Ontario general election
Riding (Note: excluding Ottawa, a multi-member constituency)	Winning party						Turnout	Votes					
Name (Note: order is as given in EO reports)	1894	Party	Votes	Share	Margin #	Margin %	Turnout	Lib	Con	I-Con	Lab	Ind	Total
Addington	Con	Con	1,901	54.30%	301	8.60%	74.61%	1,600	1,901	–	–	–	3,501
Algoma East	Lib	Lib	2,833	52.55%	275	5.10%	45.93%	2,833	2,558	–	–	–	5,391
Algoma West	Con	Lib	1,723	54.61%	291	9.22%	51.55%	1,723	1,432	–	–	–	3,155
Brant North	Lib	Lib	1,167	52.28%	102	4.57%	83.53%	1,167	1,065	–	–	–	2,232
Brant South	Lib	Lib	3,038	54.75%	527	9.50%	84.72%	3,038	2,511	–	–	–	5,549
Brockville	Lib	Lib	2,232	52.20%	188	4.40%	78.96%	2,232	2,044	–	–	–	4,276
Bruce Centre	L-PI	Lib	1,850	53.38%	234	6.75%	68.35%	1,850	–	–	–	1,616	3,466
Bruce North	L-PP	Lib	2,464	52.84%	265	5.68%	82.09%	2,464	2,199	–	–	–	4,663
Bruce South	Lib	Lib	acclaimed										
Cardwell	C-PI	Con	2,267	55.63%	459	11.26%	70.72%	1,808	2,267	–	–	–	4,075
Carleton	C-PI	I-Con	1,740	63.64%	746	27.29%	55.38%	994	–	1,740	–	–	2,734
Dufferin	PI	Con	2,660	55.99%	569	11.98%	65.78%	–	2,660	–	–	2,091	4,751
Dundas	Con	Con	2,354	51.37%	126	2.75%	86.40%	2,228	2,354	–	–	–	4,582
Durham East	Con	Con	1,949	54.26%	306	8.52%	77.55%	1,643	1,949	–	–	–	3,592
Durham West	C-PP	Con	1,825	51.69%	119	3.37%	90.22%	1,706	1,825	–	–	–	3,531
Elgin East	Con	Con	2,267	50.32%	29	0.64%	82.75%	2,238	2,267	–	–	–	4,505
Elgin West	L-PI	Con	3,101	50.01%	1	0.02%	78.62%	3,100	3,101	–	–	–	6,201
Essex North	Lib	Lib	2,683	50.15%	95	1.78%	64.37%	2,683	2,588	–	–	79	5,350
Essex South	Lib	Lib	3,138	56.05%	677	12.09%	84.07%	3,138	2,461	–	–	–	5,599
Frontenac	L-PI	Con	1,936	53.73%	269	7.47%	75.44%	–	1,936	–	–	1,667	3,603
Glengarry	L-PI	Con	1,905	47.35%	466	11.58%	73.81%	679	1,905	–	–	1,439	4,023
Grenville	Con	Con	2,361	57.43%	611	14.86%	68.35%	1,750	2,361	–	–	–	4,111
Grey Centre	PPA	Con	2,813	58.58%	1,091	22.72%	73.97%	1,722	2,813	–	–	267	4,802
Grey North	Lib	Con	2,707	51.30%	137	2.60%	76.33%	2,570	2,707	–	–	–	5,277
Grey South	PI	Con	2,249	47.35%	532	11.20%	75.47%	1,717	2,249	–	–	784	4,750
Haldimand	Con	Lib	1,957	51.34%	102	2.68%	85.14%	1,957	1,855	–	–	–	3,812
Halton	Con	Lib	2,531	51.25%	123	2.49%	84.73%	2,531	2,408	–	–	–	4,939
Hamilton East	Lib	Con	3,247	57.84%	880	15.68%	82.88%	2,367	3,247	–	–	–	5,614
Hamilton West	Lib	Con	2,752	52.66%	278	5.32%	82.51%	2,474	2,752	–	–	–	5,226
Hastings East	L-PI	Lib	2,011	51.64%	128	3.29%	83.94%	2,011	1,883	–	–	–	3,894
Hastings North	PI	Con	2,374	52.80%	252	5.60%	99.91%	2,122	2,374	–	–	–	4,496
Hastings West	Lib	Con	1,985	52.67%	201	5.33%	67.44%	1,784	1,985	–	–	–	3,769
Huron East	Lib	Lib	2,417	55.74%	498	11.49%	74.69%	2,417	1,919	–	–	–	4,336
Huron South	Lib	Con	2,775	51.47%	159	2.95%	86.14%	2,616	2,775	–	–	–	5,391
Huron West	Lib	Lib	2,465	50.01%	1	0.02%	73.71%	2,465	2,464	–	–	–	4,929
Kent East	Lib	Lib	2,869	55.32%	552	10.64%	68.47%	2,869	2,317	–	–	–	5,186
Kent West	L-PI	Lib	3,689	51.99%	283	3.99%	78.63%	3,689	3,406	–	–	–	7,095
Kingston	Con	Lib	2,125	53.66%	290	7.32%	84.35%	2,125	1,835	–	–	–	3,960
Lambton East	IC-PP	Lib	2,361	49.21%	40	0.83%	78.40%	2,361	116	–	–	2,321	4,798
Lambton West	C-PP	Lib	3,600	53.73%	500	7.46%	68.13%	3,600	3,100	–	–	–	6,700
Lanark North	Con	Lib	1,989	52.38%	181	4.77%	82.92%	1,989	1,808	–	–	–	3,797
Lanark South	Con	Con	2,195	61.09%	797	22.18%	67.71%	1,398	2,195	–	–	–	3,593
Leeds	Con	Con	2,200	55.81%	458	11.62%	67.37%	1,742	2,200	–	–	–	3,942
Lennox	Con	Lib	1,677	50.65%	43	1.30%	78.74%	1,677	1,634	–	–	–	3,311
Lincoln	Con	Con	2,974	53.15%	353	6.31%	83.14%	–	5,595	–	–	–	5,595
London	Con	Lib	3,994	50.75%	301	3.82%	85.94%	3,994	3,693	–	57	126	7,870
Middlesex East	L-PP	Con	2,463	50.98%	95	1.97%	77.57%	2,368	2,463	–	–	–	4,831
Middlesex North	L-PI	Lib	2,195	51.07%	92	2.14%	79.80%	2,195	2,103	–	–	–	4,298
Middlesex West	Lib	Lib	2,262	51.73%	151	3.45%	84.79%	2,262	2,111	–	–	–	4,373
Monck	Lib	Lib	1,985	54.50%	328	9.01%	84.46%	1,985	1,657	–	–	–	3,642
Muskoka	C-PP	Lib	1,938	50.97%	74	1.95%	70.35%	1,938	1,864	–	–	–	3,802
Nipissing	Lib	Lib	1,590	50.98%	61	1.96%	97.47%	1,590	1,529	–	–	–	3,119
Norfolk North	Lib	Lib	1,885	53.55%	250	7.10%	81.09%	1,885	1,635	–	–	–	3,520
Norfolk South	Lib	Lib	1,723	50.50%	34	1.00%	84.02%	1,723	1,689	–	–	–	3,412
Northumberland East	Con	Lib	2,814	53.95%	412	7.90%	83.44%	2,814	2,402	–	–	–	5,216
Northumberland West	Lib	Lib	1,654	52.11%	134	4.22%	84.95%	1,654	1,520	–	–	–	3,174
Ontario North	Lib	Con	2,326	55.11%	431	10.21%	95.93%	1,895	2,326	–	–	–	4,221
Ontario South	Lib	Con	2,781	50.88%	96	1.76%	97.89%	2,685	2,781	–	–	–	5,466
Oxford North	Lib	Lib	2,838	53.99%	1,023	19.46%	76.32%	2,838	604	–	–	1,815	5,257
Oxford South	Lib	Lib	2,343	58.40%	674	16.80%	62.53%	2,343	1,669	–	–	–	4,012
Parry Sound	L-PI	Lib	2,332	65.52%	1,105	31.05%	90.05%	2,332	–	–	–	1,227	3,559
Peel	Lib	Lib	2,343	53.32%	292	6.65%	81.10%	2,343	2,051	–	–	–	4,394
Perth North	Con	Lib	3,396	51.21%	160	2.41%	87.03%	3,396	3,236	–	–	–	6,632
Perth South	L-PI	Lib	2,357	49.12%	4	0.08%	82.08%	2,357	2,353	–	–	88	4,798
Peterborough East	Lib	Lib	1,771	53.25%	216	6.49%	70.55%	1,771	1,555	–	–	–	3,326
Peterborough West	Lib	Lib	2,742	61.14%	999	22.27%	82.06%	2,742	1,743	–	–	–	4,485
Prescott	Lib	Lib	acclaimed										
Prince Edward	L-PI	Con	2,387	53.96%	357	8.07%	78.17%	7	2,387	–	–	2,030	4,424
Renfrew North	Lib	Con	2,321	51.70%	153	3.41%	82.63%	2,168	2,321	–	–	–	4,489
Renfrew South	Lib	Lib	2,455	55.21%	1,441	32.40%	72.25%	2,455	978	–	–	1,014	4,447
Russell	Lib	Lib	2,738	58.26%	776	16.51%	70.52%	2,738	1,962	–	–	–	4,700
Simcoe Centre	Lib	Con	1,761	43.65%	57	1.41%	77.32%	1,704	1,761	–	–	569	4,034
Simcoe East	Con	Con	2,593	50.67%	69	1.35%	99.96%	2,524	2,593	–	–	–	5,117
Simcoe West	L-PI	Con	2,015	56.05%	435	12.10%	65.83%	1,580	2,015	–	–	–	3,595
Stormont	L-PI	Con	2,125	43.16%	182	3.70%	71.01%	1,943	2,125	–	–	855	4,923
Toronto East	C-PP	Con	3,103	67.78%	1,628	35.56%	67.37%	1,475	3,103	–	–	–	4,578
Toronto North	Con	Con	3,513	50.24%	34	0.49%	97.76%	3,479	3,513	–	–	–	6,992
Toronto South	Con	Con	4,464	52.38%	405	4.75%	67.83%	4,059	4,464	–	–	–	8,523
Toronto West	Con	Con	3,698	55.73%	760	11.45%	95.31%	2,938	3,698	–	–	–	6,636
Victoria East	Con	Con	2,289	55.29%	438	10.58%	69.88%	1,851	2,289	–	–	–	4,140
Victoria West	Lib	Con	2,163	50.82%	70	1.64%	74.02%	2,093	2,163	–	–	–	4,256
Waterloo North	Lib	Con	2,701	50.61%	65	1.22%	75.18%	2,636	2,701	–	–	–	5,337
Waterloo South	Lib	Con	2,532	51.10%	109	2.20%	75.81%	2,423	2,532	–	–	–	4,955
Welland	Lib	Lib	3,125	56.11%	681	12.23%	92.26%	3,125	2,444	–	–	–	5,569
Wellington East	Lib	Lib	1,476	36.85%	188	4.69%	75.97%	1,476	1,241	–	–	1,288	4,005
Wellington South	Lib	Lib	2,341	49.88%	396	8.44%	90.53%	2,341	1,945	–	–	407	4,693
Wellington West	C-PP	Con	1,912	53.18%	229	6.37%	76.73%	1,683	1,912	–	–	–	3,595
Wentworth North	Lib	Con	1,700	55.43%	333	10.86%	79.58%	1,367	1,700	–	–	–	3,067
Wentworth South	Lib	Lib	1,649	52.78%	174	5.57%	83.62%	1,649	1,475	–	–	–	3,124
York East	Lib	Lib	2,091	55.63%	423	11.25%	69.47%	2,091	1,668	–	–	–	3,759
York North	Lib	Lib	2,543	55.08%	469	10.16%	80.61%	2,543	2,074	–	–	–	4,617
York West	Con	Lib	2,465	50.36%	35	0.72%	83.12%	2,465	2,430	–	–	–	4,895

= open seat
= turnout is above provincial average
= winning candidate was in previous Legislature
= incumbent had switched allegiance
= previously incumbent in another riding
= not incumbent; was previously elected to the Legislature
= incumbency arose from byelection gain
= incumbency arose from prior election result being overturned by the court
= other incumbents renominated
= previously an MP in the House of Commons of Canada
= multiple candidates

Results for Ottawa (2 seats)
Political party	Candidate	Votes	%	Elected	Incumbent
Liberal	Alexander Lumsden	4,793	26.86	✓	
Conservative	Charles Berkeley Powell	4,548	25.49	✓	
Liberal	George O. O'Keefe	4,539	25.44	✗	✓
Conservative	B. Slattery	3,964	22.21		
Majority (Note: plurality for second winning candidate)		9	0.05		

=== Analysis ===
Party candidates in 2nd place (Note: excluding Ottawa seats)
Party in 1st place	Party in 2nd place				Total
Party in 1st place	Accl	Lib	Con	Ind	Total
Liberal	2		42	6	50
Conservative		36	1	4	41
Independent Conservative		1			1
Total	2	37	43	10	92

Candidates ranked 1st to 4th place, by party
Parties	Accl	1st	2nd	3rd	4th
█ Liberal	2	49	37	3	
█ Conservative		41	44	4	1
█ Independent Conservative		1			
█ Independent			10	8	
█ Labour					1

Resulting composition of the 2nd Legislative Assembly of Ontario
Source		Party			
Source		Lib	Con	I-Con	Total
Seats retained	Incumbents returned	22	10		32
Seats retained	Returned by acclamation	2			2
Seats retained	Open seats held	6	3		9
Seats changing hands	Incumbents defeated	10	15		25
Seats changing hands	Open seats gained	5	10		15
Seats changing hands	Byelection gains held	2	1		3
Seats changing hands	Incumbent changed allegiance	3	2	1	6
Ottawa seats	New MLAs	1	1		
Total		51	42	1	94

=== MLAs elected by region and riding ===
Party designations are as follows:

Liberal
Conservative
Independent Conservative

Northern Ontario

- Algoma East: Charles Franklin Farwell
- Algoma West: James Conmee
- Nipissing: John Loughrin (Note: Election declared void because of corrupt practices. Writ for new election issued. Loughrin was reelected in the subsequent byelection.)

Ottawa Valley

- Carleton: George Nelson Kidd
- Lanark North: William Clyde Caldwell
- Lanark South: Arthur James Matheson
- Ottawa: Alexander Lumsden
- Ottawa: Charles Berkeley Powell
- Prescott: Alfred Évanturel
- Renfrew North: Andrew Thomas White
- Renfrew South: Robert Adam Campbell
- Russell: Onésime Guibord

Saint Lawrence Valley

- Brockville: George Perry Graham
- Dundas: James Pliny Whitney
- Glengarry: Donald Robert McDonald
- Grenville: Robert L. Joynt
- Kingston: William Harty
- Leeds: Walter Beatty
- Stormont: John McLaughlin

Central Ontario

- Addington: James Reid
- Durham East: William Armstrong Fallis
- Durham West: William Henry Reid
- Frontenac: John S. Gallagher
- Hastings East: Samuel Russell
- Hastings North: William John Allen (Note: Tendered resignation in exchange for withdrawing election petition. Writ for new election issued. Allen was reelected in the subsequent byelection.)
- Hastings West: Marshall Bidwell Morrison
- Lennox: Bowen Ebenezer Aylsworth (Note: Election declared void because of corrupt practices. Writ for new election issued. Aylsworth was reelected in the subsequent byelection.)
- Northumberland East: John Henry Douglas (Note: Election declared void because of corrupt practices. Writ for new election issued. Douglas was reelected in the subsequent byelection.)
- Northumberland West: Samuel Clarke
- Peterborough East: Thomas Blezard
- Peterborough West: James Robert Stratton
- Prince Edward: William Ryerson Dempsey
- Victoria East: John Hilliard Carnegie
- Victoria West: Samuel John Fox

Georgian Bay

- Bruce North: Charles Martin Bowman
- Grey North: George Milward Boyd
- Muskoka: Samuel Bridgeland
- Parry Sound: William Rabb Beatty
- Simcoe Centre: Alfred Burke Thompson
- Simcoe East: Andrew Miscampbell
- Simcoe West: James Stoddart Duff

Wentworth/Halton/Niagara

- Halton: John Roaf Barber (Note: Election declared void because of corrupt practices. Writ for new election issued. Barber was reelected in the subsequent byelection.)
- Hamilton East: Henry Carscallen
- Hamilton West: Edward Alexander Colquhoun
- Lincoln: Elisha Jessop
- Monck: Richard Harcourt
- Welland: William Manley German
- Wentworth North: Thomas Atkins Wardell
- Wentworth South: John Dickenson

Midwestern Ontario

- Brant North: Daniel Burt
- Brant South: Arthur Sturgis Hardy
- Bruce Centre: Andrew Malcolm
- Bruce South: Reuben Eldridge Truax
- Dufferin: John Barr
- Grey Centre: Isaac Benson Lucas
- Grey South: David Jamieson
- Haldimand: Joseph William Holmes
- Huron East: Archibald Hislop
- Huron South: Henry Eilber
- Huron West: James Thompson Garrow (Note: Tendered resignation in exchange for withdrawing election petition. Writ for new election issued. Garrow was reelected in the subsequent byelection.)
- Norfolk North: Edwin Clarendon Carpenter
- Norfolk South: William Andrew Charlton
- Oxford North: Andrew Pattulo
- Oxford South: Angus McKay
- Perth North: John Brown
- Perth South: William Caven Moscrip (Note: Election declared void because of corrupt practices. Writ for new election issued. Samuel Nelson Monteith (Conservative) was elected in the subsequent byelection.)
- Waterloo North: Henry George Lackner (Note: Election declared void because of corrupt practices. Appeal was dismissed. Writ for new election issued. Louis Jacob Breithaupt (Liberal) was elected in the subsequent byelection.)
- Waterloo South: William Abram Kribs
- Wellington East: John Craig
- Wellington South: John Mutrie
- Wellington West: James Tucker

Southwestern Ontario

- Elgin East: Charles Andrew Brower (Note: Court ruling dismissing original election petion was overturned on appeal. Writ for election issued. Brower was reelected in the subsequent byelection.)
- Elgin West: Findlay George MacDiarmid (Note: Election declared void because of corrupt practices. Writ for new election issued. Donald Macnish (Liberal) was elected in the subsequent byelection. Byelection declared void, and MacDiarmid returned in a later byelection.)
- Essex North: William J. McKee
- Essex South: John Allan Auld
- Kent East: Robert Ferguson
- Kent West: Thomas Letson Pardo
- Lambton East: Henry John Pettypiece
- Lambton West: Frederick Forsyth Pardee
- London: Francis Baxter Leys
- Middlesex East: Thomas D. Hodgins
- Middlesex North: William Taylor
- Middlesex West: George William Ross

Peel/York/Ontario

- Cardwell: Edward Alfred Little
- Ontario North: William Henry Hoyle
- Ontario South: Charles Calder (Note: Election declared void because of corrupt practices. Writ for new election issued. John Dryden (Liberal) was elected in the subsequent byelection.)
- Peel: John Smith
- Toronto East: Robert Allan Pyne
- Toronto North: George Frederick Marter
- Toronto South: J.J. Foy
- Toronto West: Thomas Crawford
- York East: John Richardson
- York North: Elihu James Davis
- York West: William James Hill

=== Seats that changed hands ===
Elections to the 9th Parliament of Ontario – seats won/lost by party, 1894–1898
Party	1894	Gain from (loss to)																				1898
Party	1894	Lib		Con		Ind-C		Lib-P		C-PPA		POI		Con-P		L-PPA		PPA		ICP		1898
Liberal	45			10	(14)			6		2						1				1		51
Conservative	23	14	(10)					6		3		3		1		1		1				42
Independent-Conservative	–													1								1
Liberal-Patrons	12		(6)		(6)																	–
Conservative–P.P.A.	5		(2)		(3)																	–
Patrons of Industry	3				(3)																	–
Conservative-Patrons	2				(1)		(1)															–
Liberal-P.P.A.	2		(1)		(1)																	–
Protestant Protective Association	1				(1)																	–
Independent-Conservative-PPA	1		(1)																			–
Total	94	14	(20)	10	(29)	–	(1)	12	–	5	–	3	–	2	–	2	–	1	–	1	–	94

There were 50 seats that changed allegiance in the election:

Conservative to Liberal

- Algoma West
- Haldimand
- Halton
- Kingston
- Lanark North
- Lennox
- London
- Northumberland East
- Perth North
- York West

Liberal/Patrons of Industry to Liberal

- Bruce Centre
- Hastings East
- Kent West
- Middlesex North
- Parry Sound
- Perth South

Conservative/PPA to Liberal

- Lambton West
- Muskoka

Liberal/PPA to Liberal

- Bruce North

Independent-Conservative/PPA to Liberal

- Lambton East

Liberal to Conservative

- Grey North
- Hamilton East
- Hamilton West
- Hastings West
- Huron South
- Ontario North
- Ontario South
- Ottawa (1 MLA)
- Renfrew North
- Simcoe Centre
- Victoria West
- Waterloo North
- Waterloo South
- Wentworth North

Liberal/Patrons of Industry to Conservative

- Elgin West
- Frontenac
- Glengarry
- Prince Edward
- Simcoe West
- Stormont

Conservative/PPA to Conservative

- Durham West
- Toronto East
- Wellington West

Patrons of Industry to Conservative

- Dufferin
- Grey South
- Hastings North

Conservative/Patrons of Industry to Conservative

- Cardwell

Liberal/PPA to Conservative

- Middlesex East

PPA to Conservative

- Grey Centre

Conservative/Patrons of Industry to Independent-Conservative

- Carleton

=== MLAs changing parties ===
Six members changed their principal affiliation from the previous election:

Riding	MLA	1894	1898
Kent West	Thomas Letson Pardo	█ Patrons of Industry	█ Liberal
Middlesex North	William Henry Taylor	█ Patrons of Industry	█ Liberal
Parry Sound	William Rabb Beatty	█ Patrons of Industry	█ Liberal
Durham West	William Henry Reid	█ Protestant Protective Association	█ Conservative
Cardwell	Edward Alfred Little	█ Patrons of Industry	█ Conservative
Carleton	George Nelson Kidd	█ Patrons of Industry	█ Independent-Conservative

== See also ==
- Politics of Ontario
- List of Ontario political parties
- Premier of Ontario
- Leader of the Opposition (Ontario)
