= 1905 Ontario general election =

Canadian provincial election

- January 25, 1905

98 seats in the 11th Legislative Assembly of Ontario 50 seats were needed for a majority
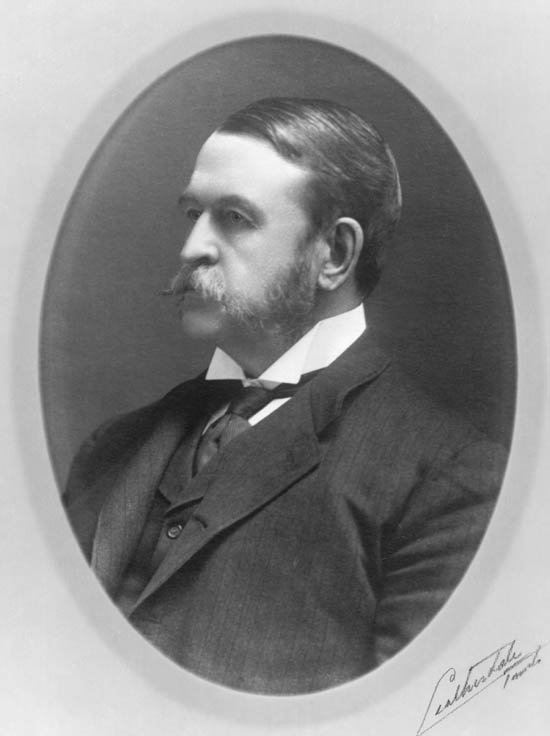

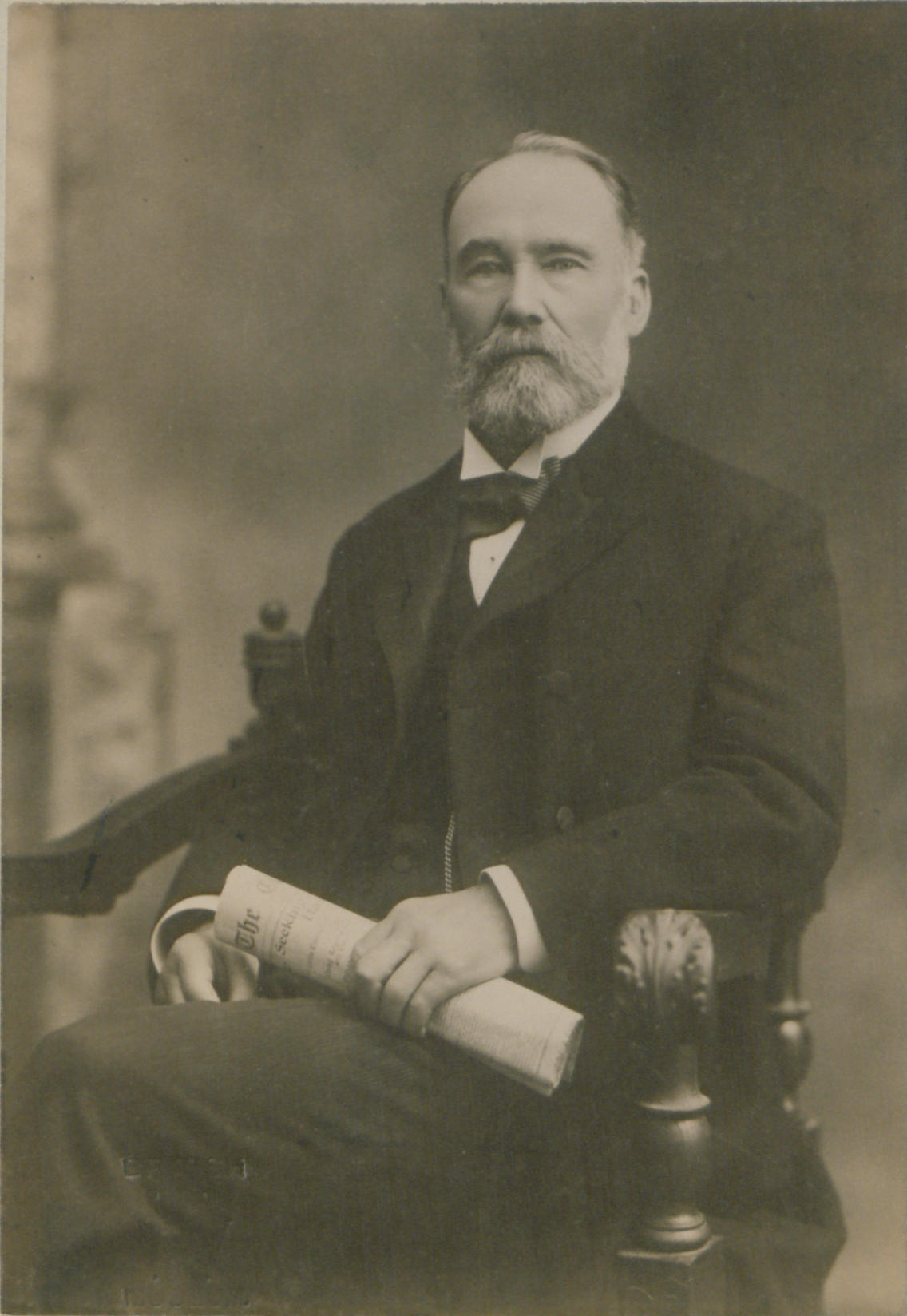
	First party	Second party
Leader	James P. Whitney	George William Ross
Party	Conservative	Liberal
Leader since	1896	1899
Leader's seat	Dundas	Middlesex West
Last election	48	50
Seats won	69	28
Seat change	▲21	▼22
Popular vote	237,612	198,595
Percentage	53.37%	44.61%
Swing	▲5.83 pp	▼5.04 pp
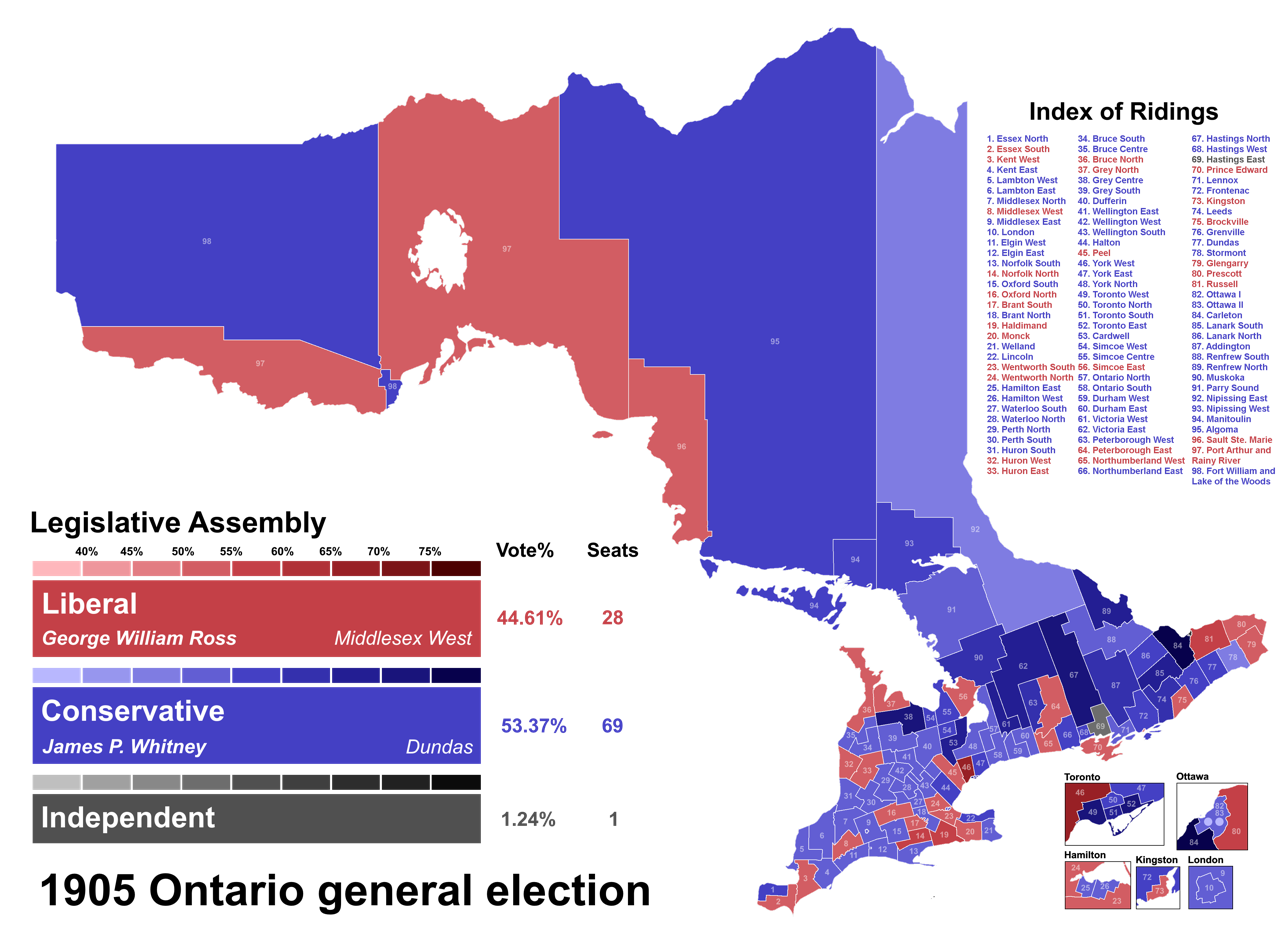
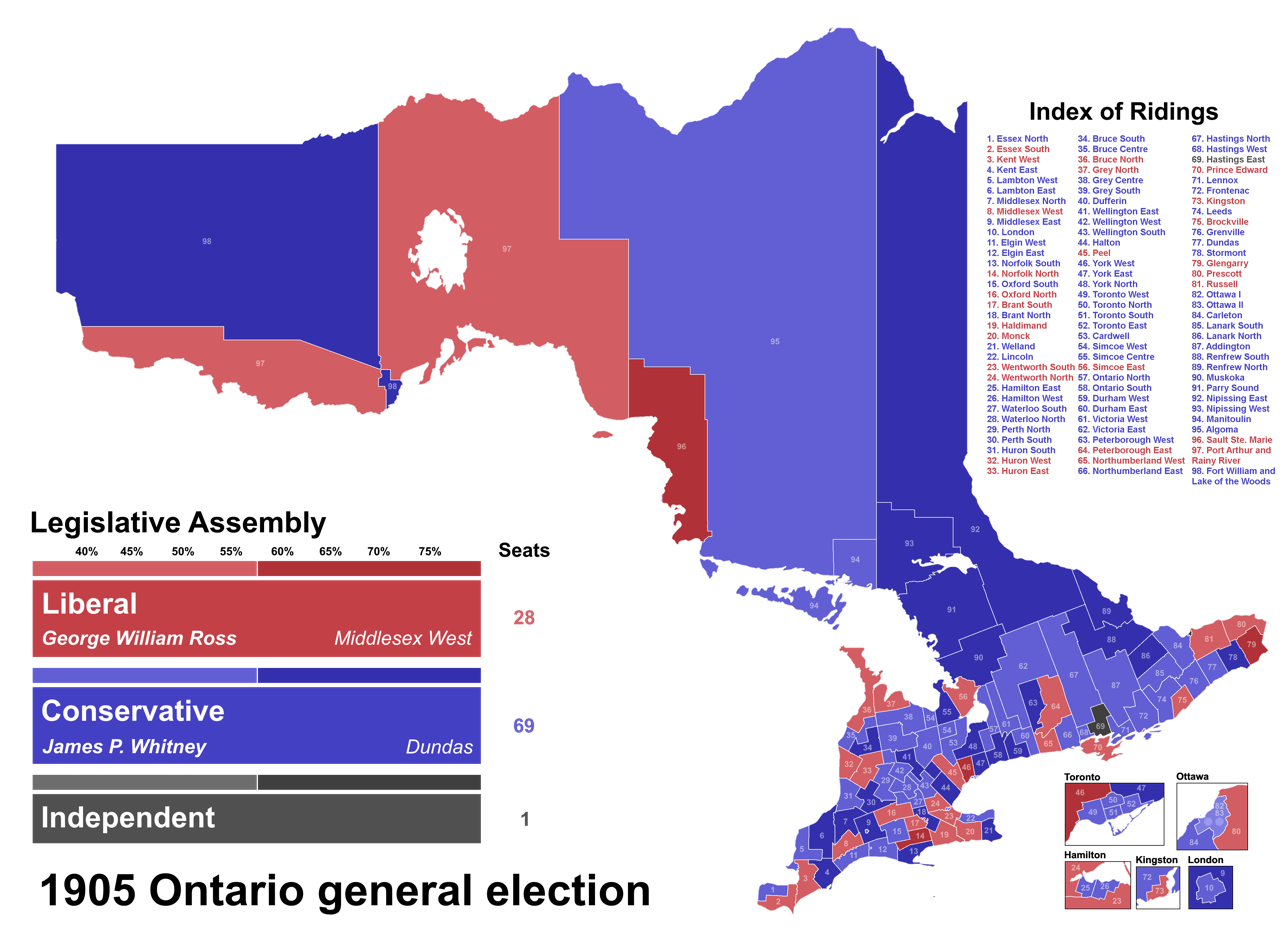
Premier before election
George William Ross
Liberal
Premier after election
James P. Whitney
Conservative

The 1905 Ontario general election was the 11th general election held in the province of Ontario, Canada. It was held on January 25, 1905, to elect the 98 Members of the 11th Legislative Assembly of Ontario ("MLAs").

The Ontario Conservative Party, led by Sir James P. Whitney, defeated the Ontario Liberal Party, led by Sir George William Ross, bringing to an end the control of the government that the Liberal Party had exercised power for the previous 34 years.

== Background ==
The Liberal Party had been in power in Ontario for the last 34 years. 24 of these were under Oliver Mowat, who was seen as a popular, moderate leader. The Liberals had been able to stay dominant elections due to Mowat's willingness to compromise and his support from farmers. In 1896, Mowat resigned the position of premier to join the cabinet of Wilfrid Laurier. He was replaced by Arthur Hardy, who resigned 3 years later due to poor health, and was replaced by George William Ross, the former Minister of Education.

The Liberals had declined significantly since the retirement of Mowat, losing the popular vote and winning only a small majority in the 1902 election. Demographic factors had hurt the party. Industrial cities that typically voted Conservative were growing while farmers - a core constituency of the Liberals - were on decline. The dominant Liberal government was also strongly criticised for corruption. In one case, Francis Clergue, a supporter of the Liberal government, was accused of bringing over Americans in Michigan and handing out drinks to get them to vote for Liberals in Sault Ste. Marie. Ross did not have Mowat's reputation of being seen as an "honest Christian man" and so found it harder to defend against the allegations.

Prohibition was also an issue after the British Privy Council declared that provinces had the right to restrict alcohol. Unlike Mowat, Ross was a much more hesitant supporter of Prohibition, believing it would be unpopular. Instead, Ross held a referendum on Prohibition in 1902, in which the motion failed despite "Yes" winning a majority of the vote, due to a 2/3rds majority being needed for it to pass. This angered pro-Prohibition Liberals and divided the party that already held a small majority. Division in the party lead to Ross calling an election in 1905.

== Campaign ==
The main focus of the campaign was on the Conservatives attacking the Liberal "machine" which had dominated elections in the Province, especially between 1898 and 1904, and was involved in numerous instances of bribery and other corrupt practices. This was further highlighted by the fact that no Liberals were prosecuted for this, while Conservatives were involved in fewer such matters but faced numerous convictions. By 1905, this had led to widespread disgust, and one Tory candidate, P.D. Ross in Ottawa, declared upon his nomination that every honest man should be a Conservative. The Globe, a newspaper founded by Liberal George Brown, endorsed the Conservatives.

The ensuing Conservative victory was overwhelming. Six constituencies returned Tory members for the first time ever since Confederation, plus eight others which had only done so once before. Most cities, other than Ottawa and Kingston, voted Conservative.

== Electoral system ==
Ottawa had two seats, and plurality block voting was used. Elsewhere the first-past-the-post election system was used.

== Results ==
Elections to the 11th Parliament of Ontario (1905)
Political party	Party leader	MPPs					Votes		
Political party	Party leader	Candidates	1902	Dissol.	1905	±	#	%	± (pp)
Conservative	James P. Whitney	98	48		69	21▲	237,612	53.37%	5.83▲
Liberal	George William Ross	95	50		28	22▼	198,595	44.61%	5.04▼
Independent Liberal		3	–		1	1▲	5,362	1.20%	New
Independent Conservative		1	–	–	–		95	0.02%	0.36▼
Independent		2	–	–	–		100	0.02%	1.16▼
Prohibitionist		2	–	–	–		1,906	0.43%	0.29▼
Socialist		7	–	–	–		1,273	0.29%	0.17▼
Temperance		2	–	–	–		250	0.06%	New
Socialist Labor		–	–	–	–		Did not campaign		
Vacant									
Total		210	98	98	98		445,193	100.00%	
Blank and invalid ballots							3,254		
Registered voters / turnout							616,996	72.68%	1.87▼

Seats and popular vote by party
Party	Seats	Votes	Change (pp)
Conservative	69 / 98	53.37%	5.83
Liberal	28 / 98	44.61%	-5.04
Other	1 / 94	2.02%	-0.79

=== Synopsis of results ===
Results by riding - 1905 Ontario general election
Riding (Note: excluding Ottawa, a multi-member constituency)	Winning party						Turnout	Votes						
Name (Note: order is as given in EO reports)	1902	Party	Votes	Share	Margin #	Margin %	Turnout	Con	Lib	I-Lib	I-Con	Ind	Oth	Total
Addington	Con	Con	1,384	64.58%	625	29.16%	49.56%	1,384	759	–	–	–	–	2,143
Algoma	Con	Con	2,064	55.22%	390	10.43%	57.46%	2,064	1,674	–	–	–	–	3,738
Brant North	Lib	Con	1,242	51.34%	65	2.69%	83.58%	1,242	1,177	–	–	–	–	2,419
Brant South	Lib	Lib	3,091	51.26%	152	2.52%	86.28%	2,939	3,091	–	–	–	–	6,030
Brockville	Lib	Lib	2,201	52.00%	169	3.99%	80.74%	2,032	2,201	–	–	–	–	4,233
Bruce Centre	Con	Con	1,982	53.47%	257	6.93%	80.79%	1,982	1,725	–	–	–	–	3,707
Bruce North	Lib	Lib	2,162	50.94%	80	1.89%	71.83%	2,082	2,162	–	–	–	–	4,244
Bruce South	Lib	Con	1,890	50.97%	72	1.94%	78.65%	1,890	1,818	–	–	–	–	3,708
Cardwell	Con	Con	1,902	65.25%	889	30.50%	54.23%	1,902	1,013	–	–	–	–	2,915
Carleton	Con	Con	1,617	78.69%	1,179	57.37%	42.74%	1,617	438	–	–	–	–	2,055
Dufferin	Con	Con	2,027	53.88%	292	7.76%	65.39%	2,027	–	–	–	–	1,735	3,762
Dundas	Con	Con	2,293	57.87%	624	15.75%	75.63%	2,293	1,669	–	–	–	–	3,962
Durham East	Con	Con	1,665	65.60%	792	31.21%	60.41%	1,665	873	–	–	–	–	2,538
Durham West	Lib	Con	1,690	52.02%	131	4.03%	88.82%	1,690	1,559	–	–	–	–	3,249
Elgin East	Con	Con	2,249	51.42%	124	2.83%	85.65%	2,249	2,125	–	–	–	–	4,374
Elgin West	Con	Con	3,129	53.02%	536	9.08%	79.02%	3,129	2,593	–	–	–	180	5,902
Essex North	Con	Con	3,385	57.04%	836	14.09%	68.70%	3,385	2,549	–	–	–	–	5,934
Essex South	Lib	Lib	2,828	51.26%	139	2.52%	76.39%	2,689	2,828	–	–	–	–	5,517
Fort William and Lake of the Woods	Lib	Con	1,536	55.57%	308	11.14%	45.06%	1,536	1,228	–	–	–	–	2,764
Frontenac	Con	Con	1,616	55.46%	318	10.91%	62.29%	1,616	1,298	–	–	–	–	2,914
Glengarry	Con	Lib	2,214	53.17%	264	6.34%	74.28%	1,950	2,214	–	–	–	–	4,164
Grenville	Con	Con	2,010	57.89%	548	15.78%	62.92%	2,010	–	1,462	–	–	–	3,472
Grey Centre	Con	Con	2,160	70.11%	1,239	40.21%	50.62%	2,160	921	–	–	–	–	3,081
Grey North	Lib	Lib	3,268	52.16%	271	4.33%	77.42%	2,997	3,268	–	–	–	–	6,265
Grey South	Con	Con	2,372	54.73%	410	9.46%	71.57%	2,372	1,962	–	–	–	–	4,334
Haldimand	Lib	Lib	2,019	57.50%	527	15.01%	86.11%	1,492	2,019	–	–	–	–	3,511
Halton	Lib	Con	2,522	55.62%	510	11.25%	82.70%	2,522	2,012	–	–	–	–	4,534
Hamilton East	Con	Con	3,273	54.48%	538	8.95%	79.39%	3,273	2,735	–	–	–	–	6,008
Hamilton West	Con	Con	3,089	53.68%	424	7.37%	80.78%	3,089	2,665	–	–	–	–	5,754
Hastings East	Lib	I-Lib	2,125	53.42%	272	6.84%	86.32%	1,853	–	2,125	–	–	–	3,978
Hastings North	Con	Con	2,327	74.51%	1,531	49.02%	44.02%	2,327	796	–	–	–	–	3,123
Hastings West	Con	Con	2,018	57.46%	524	14.92%	68.93%	2,018	1,494	–	–	–	–	3,512
Huron East	Lib	Lib	2,212	51.66%	142	3.32%	86.22%	2,070	2,212	–	–	–	–	4,282
Huron South	Con	Con	2,688	54.14%	411	8.28%	88.60%	2,688	2,277	–	–	–	–	4,965
Huron West	Lib	Lib	2,435	50.02%	2	0.04%	83.44%	2,433	2,435	–	–	–	–	4,868
Kent East	Lib	Con	2,714	50.52%	56	1.04%	76.12%	2,714	2,658	–	–	–	–	5,372
Kent West	Lib	Lib	4,073	51.05%	167	2.09%	83.46%	3,906	4,073	–	–	–	–	7,979
Kingston	Lib	Lib	2,238	50.22%	20	0.45%	91.13%	2,218	2,238	–	–	–	–	4,456
Lambton East	Lib	Con	2,587	51.94%	193	3.87%	85.17%	2,587	2,394	–	–	–	–	4,981
Lambton West	Con	Con	4,201	54.01%	624	8.02%	80.75%	4,201	3,577	–	–	–	–	7,778
Lanark North	Lib	Con	1,810	57.59%	477	15.18%	75.61%	1,810	1,333	–	–	–	–	3,143
Lanark South	Con	Con	1,565	69.90%	891	39.79%	39.61%	1,565	674	–	–	–	–	2,239
Leeds	Con	Con	1,983	64.89%	910	29.78%	55.59%	1,983	1,073	–	–	–	–	3,056
Lennox	Con	Con	1,597	51.09%	68	2.18%	81.95%	1,597	1,529	–	–	–	–	3,126
Lincoln	Con	Con	3,287	56.58%	765	13.17%	78.68%	3,287	2,522	–	–	–	–	5,809
London	Con	Con	4,783	52.27%	566	6.19%	86.19%	4,783	4,217	–	–	–	150	9,150
Manitoulin	Con	Con	1,277	56.43%	448	19.80%	42.66%	1,277	829	–	–	–	157	2,263
Middlesex East	Lib	Con	2,463	51.46%	140	2.93%	85.15%	2,463	2,323	–	–	–	–	4,786
Middlesex North	Lib	Con	2,069	50.69%	56	1.37%	84.68%	2,069	2,013	–	–	–	–	4,082
Middlesex West	Lib	Lib	2,043	51.42%	113	2.84%	84.00%	1,930	2,043	–	–	–	–	3,973
Monck	Lib	Lib	1,766	51.11%	77	2.23%	82.77%	1,689	1,766	–	–	–	–	3,455
Muskoka	Lib	Con	2,122	63.46%	900	26.91%	59.12%	2,122	1,222	–	–	–	–	3,344
Nipissing East	Lib	Con	1,524	49.48%	63	2.05%	58.63%	1,524	1,461	–	95	–	–	3,080
Nipissing West	Lib	Con	1,533	58.62%	451	17.25%	44.50%	1,533	1,082	–	–	–	–	2,615
Norfolk North	Con	Lib	1,969	55.36%	381	10.71%	88.14%	1,588	1,969	–	–	–	–	3,557
Norfolk South	Lib	Con	1,711	50.19%	13	0.38%	91.67%	1,711	1,698	–	–	–	–	3,409
Northumberland East	Con	Con	2,644	59.47%	842	18.94%	75.38%	2,644	1,802	–	–	–	–	4,446
Northumberland West	Lib	Lib	1,510	54.91%	270	9.82%	81.64%	1,240	1,510	–	–	–	–	2,750
Ontario North	Con	Con	2,258	52.10%	182	4.20%	85.32%	2,258	2,076	–	–	–	–	4,334
Ontario South	Lib	Con	2,720	51.05%	112	2.10%	87.48%	2,720	2,608	–	–	–	–	5,328
Oxford North	Lib	Lib	2,885	54.82%	507	9.63%	75.82%	2,378	2,885	–	–	–	–	5,263
Oxford South	Con	Con	2,713	52.04%	213	4.09%	82.73%	2,713	2,500	–	–	–	–	5,213
Parry Sound	Lib	Con	2,243	52.37%	374	8.73%	43.75%	2,243	1,869	–	–	–	171	4,283
Peel	Lib	Lib	2,269	50.36%	32	0.71%	86.86%	2,237	2,269	–	–	–	–	4,506
Perth North	Con	Con	3,712	52.21%	314	4.42%	88.18%	3,712	3,398	–	–	–	–	7,110
Perth South	Lib	Con	2,555	50.58%	59	1.17%	87.11%	2,555	2,496	–	–	–	–	5,051
Peterborough East	Lib	Lib	1,371	52.25%	118	4.50%	64.81%	1,253	1,371	–	–	–	–	2,624
Peterborough West	Lib	Con	2,967	62.33%	1,174	24.66%	73.55%	2,967	1,793	–	–	–	–	4,760
Port Arthur and Rainy River	Lib	Lib	1,285	50.27%	14	0.55%	53.77%	1,271	1,285	–	–	–	–	2,556
Prescott	Lib	Lib	2,093	50.01%	1	0.02%	67.64%	–	4,185 (Note: the incumbent Alfred Évanturel received 2,092 votes)	–	–	–	–	4,185
Prince Edward	Lib	Lib	2,270	50.06%	5	0.11%	85.84%	2,265	2,270	–	–	–	–	4,535
Renfrew North	Lib	Con	2,791	67.48%	1,446	34.96%	73.03%	2,791	1,345	–	–	–	–	4,136
Renfrew South	Lib	Con	2,457	54.55%	410	9.10%	70.65%	2,457	2,047	–	–	–	–	4,504
Russell	Lib	Lib	2,557	59.55%	820	19.10%	54.87%	1,737	2,557	–	–	–	–	4,294
Sault Ste. Marie	Con	Lib	1,396	52.05%	110	4.10%	55.73%	1,286	1,396	–	–	–	–	2,682
Simcoe Centre	Lib	Con	2,201	57.26%	558	14.52%	79.10%	2,201	1,643	–	–	–	–	3,844
Simcoe East	Lib	Lib	3,284	51.92%	243	3.84%	77.68%	3,041	3,284	–	–	–	–	6,325
Simcoe West	Con	Con	2,129	59.60%	686	19.20%	65.33%	2,129	1,443	–	–	–	–	3,572
Stormont	Lib	Con	2,679	49.93%	37	0.69%	79.90%	2,723 (Note: George Kerr was the winning candidate)	2,642	–	–	–	–	5,365
Toronto East	Con	Con	3,573	72.08%	2,373	47.87%	55.23%	3,573	1,200	–	–	–	184	4,957
Toronto North	Con	Con	5,189	57.00%	1,485	16.31%	70.74%	5,189	3,704	–	–	–	211	9,104
Toronto South	Con	Con	5,380	68.48%	3,072	39.10%	57.89%	5,380	2,308	–	–	–	168	7,856
Toronto West	Con	Con	4,998	70.26%	3,223	45.31%	53.88%	4,998	–	1,775	–	28	313	7,114
Victoria East	Con	Con	2,128	67.02%	1,081	34.05%	58.99%	2,128	1,047	–	–	–	–	3,175
Victoria West	Con	Con	2,211	51.61%	138	3.22%	78.33%	2,211	2,073	–	–	–	–	4,284
Waterloo North	Con	Con	3,021	52.51%	361	6.27%	74.87%	3,021	2,660	–	–	72	–	5,753
Waterloo South	Con	Con	2,862	54.19%	443	8.39%	73.89%	2,862	2,419	–	–	–	–	5,281
Welland	Lib	Con	3,328	52.29%	291	4.57%	79.15%	3,328	3,037	–	–	–	–	6,365
Wellington East	Lib	Con	1,910	52.36%	172	4.71%	74.39%	1,910	1,738	–	–	–	–	3,648
Wellington South	Con	Con	2,640	51.18%	282	5.47%	80.29%	2,640	2,358	–	–	–	160	5,158
Wellington West	Con	Con	1,863	53.20%	224	6.40%	79.89%	1,863	1,639	–	–	–	–	3,502
Wentworth North	Lib	Lib	1,612	50.44%	28	0.88%	80.53%	1,584	1,612	–	–	–	–	3,196
Wentworth South	Lib	Lib	1,490	54.01%	221	8.01%	78.50%	1,269	1,490	–	–	–	–	2,759
York East	Lib	Con	2,228	55.33%	429	10.65%	73.50%	2,228	1,799	–	–	–	–	4,027
York North	Lib	Con	2,827	52.49%	268	4.98%	87.60%	2,827	2,559	–	–	–	–	5,386
York West (Note: EO error re party affiliations corrected)	Con	Con	3,276	64.07%	1,439	28.14%	61.08%	3,276	1,837	–	–	–	–	5,113

= open seat
= turnout is above provincial average
= winning candidate was in previous Legislature
= incumbent had switched allegiance
= previously incumbent in another riding
= not incumbent; was previously elected to the Legislature
= incumbency arose from byelection gain
= incumbency arose from prior election result being overturned by the court
= other incumbents renominated
= previously an MP in the House of Commons of Canada
= multiple candidates

Results for Ottawa (2 seats)
Political party	Candidate	Votes	%	Elected	Incumbent
Liberal	Donald Joseph McDougal	6,053	26.06	✓	
Liberal	George Samuel May	5,904	25.42	✓	
Conservative	Dennis Murphy	5,675	24.43	✗	✓
Conservative	P.D. Ross	5,596	24.09		
Majority (Note: plurality for second winning candidate)		229	0.99		
Turnout		11,726	74.01		
Registered voters		15,844			

=== Analysis ===
Party candidates in 2nd place (Note: excluding Ottawa seats)
Party in 1st place	Party in 2nd place				Total
Party in 1st place	Con	Lib	I-Lib	Proh	Total
Conservative		66	2	1	69
Liberal	25	1			26
Independent Liberal	1				1
Total	26	67	2	1	96

Candidates ranked 1st to 5th place, by party
Parties	1st	2nd	3rd	4th	5th
█ Conservative	69	26	2	1	
█ Liberal	27	68			
█ Independent Liberal	1	2			
█ Prohibitionist		1	1		
█ Socialist			7		
█ Temperance			1	1	
█ Independent			1		1
█ Independent Conservative			1		

Resulting composition of the 10th Legislative Assembly of Ontario
Source		Party			
Source		Con	Lib	I-Lib	Total
Seats retained	Incumbents returned	37	18		55
Seats retained	Open seats held	5	5		10
Seats retained	Byelection losses reversed	2			2
Seats changing hands	Incumbents defeated	16	1		17
Seats changing hands	Open seats gained	8	1	1	10
Seats changing hands	Byelection gains held	1	1		2
Ottawa seats	New MLA		1		1
Ottawa seats	Incumbent defeated		1		1
Total		69	28	1	98

=== Members elected by region and electoral district ===
Party designations: Conservative Liberal Independent Liberal

Southwestern Ontario
- Elgin East: Charles Andrew Brower
- Elgin West: Findlay George MacDiarmid
- Essex North: Joseph Octave Reaume
- Essex South: John Allan Auld
- Kent East: Philip Henry Bowyer
- Kent West: Archibald Blake McCoig
- Lambton East: Hugh Montgomery
- Lambton West: William John Hanna
- London: Adam Beck
- Middlesex East: George Wesley Neely
- Middlesex North: Charles Constantine Hodgins
- Middlesex West: George William Ross

Midwestern Ontario

- Brant North: John Henry Fisher
- Brant South: Thomas Hiram Preston
- Bruce Centre: Hugh Clark
- Bruce North: Charles Martin Bowman
- Bruce South: Robert Edwin Clapp
- Dufferin: Frederick William Lewis
- Grey North: Alexander Grant MacKay
- Grey Centre: Isaac Benson Lucas
- Grey South: David Jamieson
- Haldimand: Jacob Kohler
- Huron East: Archibald Hislop
- Huron South: Henry Eilber
- Huron West: Malcolm Graeme Cameron
- Norfolk North: Thomas Robert Atkinson
- Norfolk South: Arthur Clarence Pratt
- Oxford North: James S. Munro
- Oxford South: Donald Sutherland
- Perth North: James Torrance
- Perth South: Samuel Nelson Monteith
- Waterloo North: Henry George Lackner
- Waterloo South: George Pattinson
- Wellington East: James J. Craig
- Wellington South: Joseph Patrick Downey
- Wellington West: James Tucker

Northern Ontario
- Algoma: William Ross Smyth
- Fort William and Lake of the Woods: Thomas Smellie
- Manitoulin: Robert Roswell Gamey
- Nipissing East: Charles Lamarche
- Nipissing West: Azaire Adulphe Aubin
- Port Arthur and Rainy River: Hugh W. Kennedy
- Sault Ste. Marie: Charles Napier Smith

Wentworth/Halton/Niagara

- Halton: Alfred Westland Nixon
- Hamilton East: Henry Carscallen
- Hamilton West: John Strathearn Hendrie
- Lincoln: Elisha Jessop
- Monck: Richard Harcourt
- Welland: Evan Eugene Fraser
- Wentworth North: Robert Adam Thompson
- Wentworth South: Daniel Reed

Peel/York/Ontario

- Cardwell: Edward Alfred Little
- Ontario North: William Henry Hoyle
- Ontario South: Charles Calder
- Peel: John Smith
- York East: Alexander McCowan
- York North: Thomas Herbert Lennox
- York West: Joseph Wesley St. John

Toronto

- Toronto East: Robert Allan Pyne
- Toronto North: William Beattie Nesbitt
- Toronto South: J.J. Foy
- Toronto West: Thomas Crawford

Ottawa Valley
- Carleton: George Nelson Kidd
- Lanark North: Richard Franklin Preston
- Lanark South: Arthur James Matheson
- Ottawa: George Samuel May
- Ottawa: Donald Joseph McDougal
- Prescott: Joseph Louis Labrosse
- Renfrew North: Edward Arunah Dunlop
- Renfrew South: Thomas William McGarry
- Russell: Damase Racine

Saint Lawrence Valley

- Brockville: George Perry Graham
- Dundas: James Pliny Whitney
- Glengarry: John Angus McMillan
- Grenville: George Howard Ferguson
- Kingston: Edward John Barker Pense (Note: Election declared void because of corrupt practices. Writ for new election issued. Pense was reelected in the subsequent byelection.)
- Leeds: John Robertson Dargavel
- Stormont: George Kerr

Central Ontario

- Addington: William James Paul
- Durham East: Josiah Johnston Preston
- Durham West: John Henry Devitt
- Frontenac: John S. Gallagher
- Hastings East: Edward Walter Rathbun
- Hastings North: Josiah Williams Pearce
- Hastings West: Marshall Bidwell Morrison
- Lennox: Thomas George Carscallen
- Northumberland East: William Arnson Willoughby
- Northumberland West: Samuel Clarke
- Muskoka: Arthur Arnold Mahaffy
- Parry Sound: John Galna
- Simcoe Centre: Alfred Burke Thompson
- Simcoe East: James Brockett Tudhope
- Simcoe West: James Stoddart Duff
- Peterborough East: William A. Anderson
- Peterborough West: Thomas Evans Bradburn
- Prince Edward: Morley Currie
- Victoria East: John Hilliard Carnegie
- Victoria West: Samuel John Fox

=== Seats that changed hands ===
Elections to the 11th Parliament of Ontario – seats won/lost by party, 1902–1905
Party	1902	Gain from (loss to)						1905
Party	1902	Con		Lib		I-Lib		1905
Conservative	48			26	(5)			69
Liberal	50	5	(26)				(1)	28
Independent-Liberal	–	1						1
Total	98	6	(26)	26	(5)	–	(1)	98

There were 32 seats that changed allegiance in the election:

Liberal to Conservative

- Brant
- Bruce South
- Durham West
- Fort William and Lake of the Woods
- Halton
- Kent East
- Lambton East
- Lanark North
- Middlesex East
- Middlesex North
- Muskoka
- Nipissing East
- Nipissing West

- Norfolk South
- Ontario South
- Parry Sound
- Perth South
- Peterborough West
- Renfrew South
- Simcoe Centre
- Stormont
- Welland
- Wellington East
- York East
- York North
- York West

Liberal to Independent-Liberal

- Hastings East

Conservative to Liberal

- Glengarry
- Norfolk North
- Ottawa (both MLAs)
- Sault Ste. Marie

== See also ==
- Politics of Ontario
- List of Ontario political parties
- Premier of Ontario
- Leader of the Opposition (Ontario)
