= Daniel John O'Donoghue =

Canadian politician

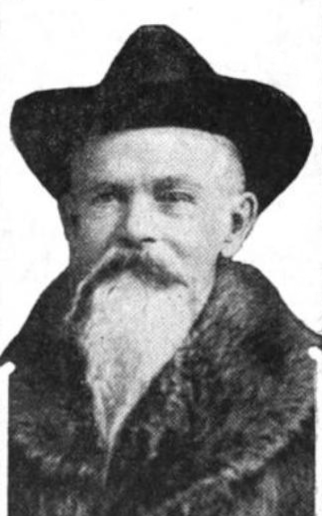

Member of the Legislative Assembly of Ontario
- In office 1874–1879
- Constituency: Ottawa

Personal details
- Born: August 1, 1844; County Kerry, Ireland
- Died: January 16, 1907 (aged 62); Toronto, Ontario, Canada
- Political party: Liberal
- Spouse: Marie Cloutier
- Occupation: Printer, labour leader, politician

Daniel John O'Donoghue (August 1, 1844 – January 16, 1907) was a printer, labour leader and political figure in Ontario. O'Donoghue is recognized as one of the original founders of organized labour in Canada and in 1874 he became the first labour candidate elected to a Canadian legislature.

== Labour activism ==
He was born near Killarney in County Kerry, Ireland on August 1, 1844, and came to Canada with his parents in 1852. Required to support his family after the death of his father, he became an apprentice to a printer in Ottawa at 13. He later spent time learning his trade as a printer while working in various places in the United States. In 1866, he returned to work in Ottawa, where he helped form Ottawa Typographical Union, later part of the International Typographical Union. In 1872, with Donald Robertson, he convinced Sir John A. Macdonald to introduce legislation legalizing trade unions. Later that year, O'Donoghue and Robertson helped found the Ottawa Trades Council; O'Donoghue became president in 1873. Later that year, he led an unsuccessful strike for a nine-hour day for printers. Also during that year, he helped found the Canadian Labour Union and became its first vice-president.

== Election to the legislature ==
He was elected to the sole seat representing the City of Ottawa in the Legislative Assembly of Ontario in an 1874 by-election. The City of Ottawa at the time was heavily populated by labourers brought in to help erect the Parliament Buildings on Parliament Hill and other structures for the new capital. The working class community was sharply divided between the Irish and French Canadian workers, but O'Donoghue helped personally bridge this gap through his marriage to Marie Cloutier. O'Donoghue's candidacy was made possible by the recent decision by Oliver Mowat's government to remove the property qualifications on running for office. O'Donoghue triumphed winning 59.2% of the vote, aided by the decision by the Liberal-Conservative to drop out on the day of the election. During his time in office, he lobbied for extending the vote to more people in the province, although he opposed extending the vote to women. He was reelected in 1875. Facing concerted opposition from both the Liberals and Conservatives, he lost in most of the city, but won a massive majority in the working-class neighbourhoods of Lowertown. By the next election things had changed, as a deep recession had deeply wounded the labour movement in Ottawa, O'Donoghue finished third.

== Later career ==
After his defeat he moved to Guelph, Ontario, where he edited a labour paper, then to Toronto. In 1880, he began work at the World and became a member of the Toronto Typographical Union. He became the editor of the Labour Record in 1886. He was a lifelong active member of the Knights of Labor and was a paid organized for them. He helped found the Toronto Trades and Labour Council in 1881. In 1883, he helped form the Trades and Labour Congress of Canada. He also helped convince the leaders of the Roman Catholic Church in Canada to accept rather than oppose a new international labour organization, the Knights of Labor. O'Donoghue served ten years on the board of the Toronto Technical School, which helped train workers. He worked at the Ontario Bureau of Industries, a provincial statistical agency that collected information on labour and industry. In 1900, he became the first fair-wage officer for Canada, working first at the Department of Public Works and then the Department of Labour. He became ill in 1906 while working in British Columbia as part of his functions in that post, and died at his home in Toronto on January 16, 1907.

== Electoral history ==
Ontario provincial by-election, January 18, 1874: Ottawa Resignation of Richard William Scott
Party	Candidate	Votes	%
Liberal	Daniel John O'Donoghue	882	69.72
Independent	R. Nagle	285	22.53
Independent	T.M. Blasdell	91	7.19
Independent	G.H. Preston	7	0.55
Total valid votes		1,265	100.0
Liberal hold			
Source: History of the Electoral Districts, Legislatures and Ministries of the Province of Ontario

1875 Ontario general election: Ottawa
Party	Candidate	Votes	%	±%
Liberal	Daniel John O'Donoghue	852	35.35	−34.37
Liberal	J. P. Featherston	800	33.20	−36.53
Conservative	John O'Connor	758	31.45	
Total valid votes		2,410	54.25	
Eligible voters		4,442		
Liberal hold		Swing		−34.37
Source: Elections Ontario

1879 Ontario general election: Ottawa
Party	Candidate	Votes	%	±%
Conservative	Patrick Baskerville	1,064	39.72	+8.26
Independent	George Samuel May	1,000	37.33	
Liberal	Daniel John O'Donoghue	606	22.62	−45.93
Independent	Mr. St. Jean	5	0.19	
Independent	W.D. O'Keefe	4	0.15	
Total valid votes		2,679	47.99	−6.26
Eligible voters		5,582		
Conservative gain from Liberal		Swing		+8.26
Source: Elections Ontario

== Bibliography ==
- Clavette, Ken. "The 'Rag, Tag, and Bobnail:' The rise and fall of Ottawa's early working class." Ottawa: Making A Capital. Ottawa: Ottawa University Press, 2001.
- Forsey, Eugene, "Trade Unions in Canada 1812-1902", Toronto: University of Toronto Press, 1982.
- French, Doris, "Faith, Sweat, and Politics: The Early Trade Union Years in Canada" (Toronto: McClelland and Stewart Ltd 1962)
- Parsons, Vic, "Daniel O'Donoghue: 'Grand Old Man' of Canada's Labour Movement", The Beaver, December 1998/January 1999, Vol. 78, No.6, pp26–29
- O’Donoghue, John G., "Daniel John O’Donoghue Father of the Canadian Labour Movement", The Canadian Catholic Historical Association Report 1942–43, pp87–96
