= Richard William Scott =

Canadian politician

The Honourable Sir Richard William Scott PC KC
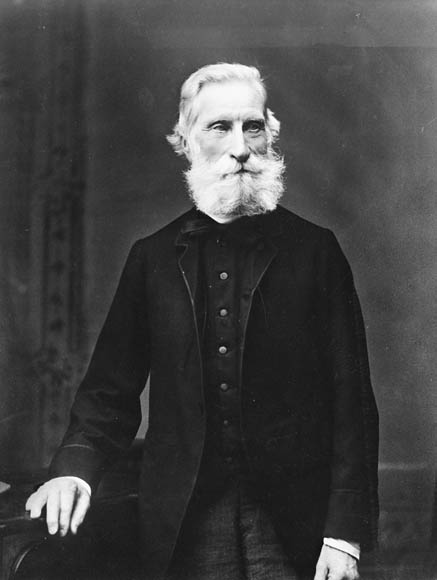
- Sir Richard William Scott

5th Mayor of Bytown
- In office 1852–1853
- Preceded by: Charles Sparrow
- Succeeded by: J. B. Turgeon

Member of the Legislative Assembly of Ontario
- In office 1867–1874
- Preceded by: None
- Succeeded by: Daniel John O'Donoghue
- Constituency: Ottawa

2nd Speaker of the Legislative Assembly of Ontario
- In office December 7, 1871 – December 21, 1871
- Preceded by: John Stevenson
- Succeeded by: James Currie

Canadian Senator from Ontario
- In office March 13, 1874 – April 23, 1913
- Appointed by: Alexander Mackenzie

Personal details
- Born: February 24, 1825 Prescott, Upper Canada
- Died: April 23, 1913 (aged 88) Ottawa, Ontario, Canada
- Party: Liberal
- Other political affiliations: Ontario Liberal Party
- Spouse: Mary Ann Heron
- Cabinet: Provincial: Commissioner of Crown Lands; Federal: Minister Without Portfolio; Secretary of State of Canada; Superintendent-General of Indian Affairs (Acting); Minister of the Interior (Acting)

Sir Richard William Scott, PC KC (February 24, 1825 – April 23, 1913) was a Canadian politician and cabinet minister.

== Early life ==
He was born in Prescott, Ontario, in 1825, a descendant of a family from County Clare. A lawyer by training, Scott was admitted to the bar in 1848 and established a practice in Bytown (now Ottawa). Among the students who articled in his practice was Alexander Cameron Rutherford, the first Premier of Alberta.

== Political career ==
Scott became a member of municipal council in 1851, was mayor of Bytown in 1852, and held a seat in the Legislative Assembly of the Province of Canada from 1857 to 1863. With Canadian Confederation, Scott won a seat in the Ontario legislature as a Liberal representing Ottawa from 1867 to 1871. He was Speaker of the legislature briefly in December 1871 before he was appointed to the provincial cabinet as Commissioner of Crown Lands. Scott played a leading role in passing legislation ensuring the rights of separate schools in Ontario.

In November 1873, he left provincial politics when he was appointed minister without portfolio by Alexander Mackenzie in the federal Cabinet. Mackenzie had become prime minister after Sir John A. Macdonald's government had been forced to resign because of the Pacific Scandal. Scott was appointed to the Senate of Canada by Mackenzie in January 1874 and became Secretary of State for Canada and Leader of the Government in the Senate.

A supporter of temperance, he drafted the "Scott Act," which allowed any county or municipality in Canada to prohibit the retail sale of liquor by majority vote. With the defeat of the Liberal government in the 1878 election, Scott became Leader of the Opposition in the Senate until the return of the Liberals to government, under Wilfrid Laurier. Scott resumed his old Cabinet position of Secretary of State.

Scott retired from the cabinet in 1908 but remained in the Senate until his death in 1913.

He was made a knight in 1909 by King Edward VII.

== Family ==
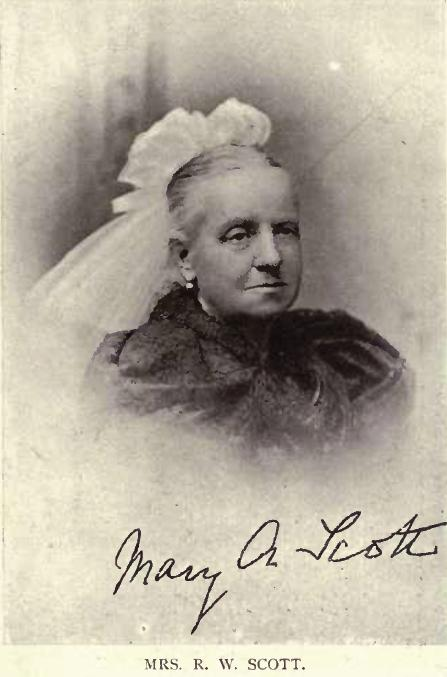
Mrs Mary A Scott by William James Topley

Richard William Scott was married in Philadelphia, Pa., November 8, 1853, to Mary Heron, the daughter of John Heron and Frances, his wife. She was born and educated in Dublin, Ireland. The couple had two sons William L. Scott, Local Master in Chancery, and D Arcy Scott, Barrister, Ottawa and four daughters. Before her marriage, Mrs. Scott was a professional singer who toured in Canada and the United States as a member of "The Heron sisters." The couple lived at 274 Daly Avenue, Ottawa. She served on the executive committee of the National Council of Women and as a vice-president of the Local Council.

== Archives ==
There is a Richard William Scott fonds at Library and Archives Canada.

== Electoral history ==
1867 Ontario general election: Ottawa
Party	Candidate	Votes	%
Liberal	Richard William Scott	810	68.76
Conservative	Henry J. Friel	368	31.24
Total valid votes		1,178	41.49
Eligible voters		2,839	
Liberal pickup new district.			
Source: Elections Ontario

1871 Ontario general election: Ottawa
Party	Candidate	Votes	%	±%
Liberal	Richard William Scott	574	76.33	+7.57
Conservative	G.H. Preston	178	23.67	−7.57
Turnout		752	27.68	−13.81
Eligible voters		2,717		
Liberal hold		Swing		+7.57
Source: Elections Ontario

Ontario provincial by-election, January 1872: Ottawa Ministerial by-election
Party	Candidate	Votes
Liberal	Richard William Scott	Acclaimed
Source: History of the Electoral Districts, Legislatures and Ministries of the Province of Ontario

Parliament of Canada
Preceded by Luc Letellier de St.-Just	Leader of the Government in the Senate of Canada; 1876–1878	Succeeded by Alexander Campbell
Preceded by David Mills	Leader of the Government in the Senate of Canada; 1902–1908	Succeeded by Sir Richard John Cartwright
