= Patrick Baskerville =

Canadian politician (c.1829–1901)

Patrick Baskerville (born c. 1829 – June 29, 1901) was an Irish-born Canadian businessman and political figure in Ontario. He represented the riding of Ottawa in the Legislative Assembly of Ontario from 1879 to 1886 as a Conservative member.

Baskerville was born in Ballyrusheen, County Tipperary, Ireland in 1829, the son of George Baskerville, a farmer, and emigrated to Bytown with his family in 1847. Baskerville worked at farming and the timber trade, before becoming a clerk with the Bytown and Prescott Railway in 1854. In 1862, he became a merchant, selling groceries. His three brothers joined the business as partners in 1870.

== Electoral history ==
1879 Ontario general election: Ottawa
Party	Candidate	Votes	%	±%
Conservative	Patrick Baskerville	1,064	39.72	+8.26
Independent	George Samuel May	1,000	37.33	
Liberal	Daniel John O'Donoghue	606	22.62	−45.93
Independent	Mr. St. Jean	5	0.19	
Independent	W.D. O'Keefe	4	0.15	
Total valid votes		2,679	47.99	−6.26
Eligible voters		5,582		
Conservative gain from Liberal		Swing		+8.26
Source: Elections Ontario
