= J. B. Turgeon =

Canadian mayor (1810-1897)

Joseph Balsora Turgeon
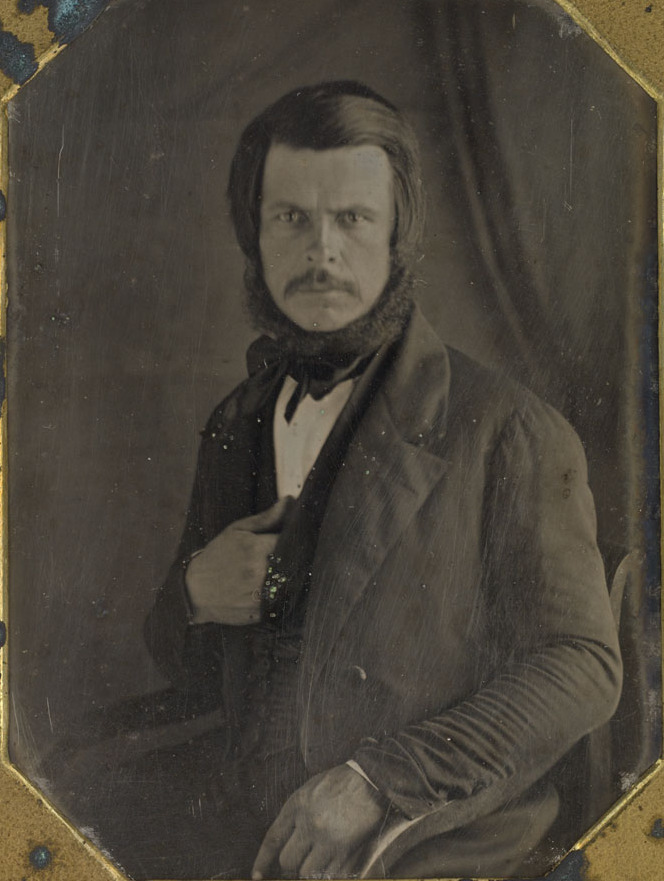

Mayor of Bytown
- In office 1853–1853
- Preceded by: Richard William Scott
- Succeeded by: Henry J. Friel

Personal details
- Born: 1810; Terrebonne, Lower Canada
- Died: July 17, 1897; Hull, Quebec

Joseph-Balsora Turgeon (1810 – July 17, 1897) was the first French-Canadian mayor of Bytown, Canada. He was born in Terrebonne, Quebec in 1810 and came to Bytown in around 1836. He was elected to the town council in 1848, 1849, 1851 and 1852. In 1852, he became a school trustee and also founded L'Institut canadien-français d'Ottawa. He became mayor of Bytown in 1853. Turgeon proposed the establishment of a Separate School system in Bytown and also lobbied for more French-speaking teachers. He also suggested a new name rich in history, Ottawa, for the town.

He died in Hull, Quebec in 1897 and buried at Notre Dame Cemetery.

== Bibliography ==
- Pelletier, Jean Yves (2006), L'Institut canadien-français d'Ottawa (1852 à 2002), Ottawa, Ontario: Jean Yves Pelletier

Political offices
Preceded by Richard William Scott	Mayor of Bytown; 1853	Succeeded by Henry J. Friel
