= Ottawa (Ontario provincial electoral district) =

Ontario electoral district

Ontario electoral district

Defunct provincial electoral district
- Legislature: Legislative Assembly of Ontario
- District created: 1867
- District abolished: 1908
- First contested: 1867
- Last contested: 1905

Demographics
- Census division: Carleton County
- Census subdivision(s): Ottawa, Ottawa East (1894-1908); Hintonburg (1894-1908); Nepean Township (1894-1908)

Ottawa was the name of a provincial electoral district that elected one member to the Legislative Assembly of Ontario, Canada from 1867 to 1894 and two members from 1894 to 1908.

The riding was created when Ontario became a province in 1867, initially consisting solely of the City of Ottawa. It was expanded in the 1894 redistribution to include the villages of Ottawa East and Hintonburg, the unincorporated community of Mechanicsville and that part of the Township of Nepean located in Lots 36, 37, 38 in Concession A of Ottawa Front (mostly the area around the Bayswater community, today the area east of Parkdale Avenue and north of Carling Avenue). The riding was abolished in the 1908 redistribution into Ottawa East and Ottawa West.

When the Ottawa district had two members, 1894–1908, each voter could cast up to two votes (Block Voting).

== Members of Provincial Parliament ==
Assembly	Years	Member	Party
1st	1867–1871	Richard William Scott	Liberal
2nd	1871–1874	Richard William Scott	Liberal
2nd	1874–1874	Daniel John O'Donoghue	Liberal
3rd	1875–1879	Daniel John O'Donoghue	Liberal
4th	1879–1883	Patrick Baskerville	Conservative
5th	1883–1886	Patrick Baskerville	Conservative
6th	1886–1890	Erskine Henry Bronson	Liberal
7th	1890–1894	Erskine Henry Bronson	Liberal

Assembly	Years	Member	Party	Member	Party
Two members
8th	1894–1898	George O. O'Keefe	Liberal	Erskine Henry Bronson	Liberal
9th	1898–1902	Charles Berkeley Powell	Conservative	Alexander Lumsden	Liberal
10th	1902–1904	Charles Berkeley Powell	Conservative	Dennis Murphy	Conservative
11th	1905–1908	George Samuel May	Liberal	Donald Joseph McDougal	Liberal

== Election results ==
=== 1894–1908 (two members elected) ===
Plurality block voting was used

1905 Ontario general election
Party	Candidate	Votes	%	±%	Elected
Liberal	Donald Joseph McDougal	6,053	26.06	-20.29	✓
Liberal	George Samuel May	5,904	25.42	-20.93	✓
Conservative	Dennis Murphy	5,675	24.43	-29.22	
Conservative	Mr. Ross	5,596	24.09	-29.56	
Total valid votes		23,228	99.80		
Total rejected ballots		47	0.20	+0.16	
Turnout		23,275	148.09	+12.24	
Eligible voters		15,717			
Liberal gain from Conservative		Swing		+0.32	
Source: Elections Ontario

1902 Ontario general election
Party	Candidate	Votes	%	±%	Elected
Conservative	Dennis Murphy	5,770	27.15	-20.56	✓
Conservative	Charles Berkeley Powell	5,633	26.50	-21.20	✓
Liberal	S. Bingham	5,154	24.25	–28.05	
Liberal	Alexander Lumsden	4,698	22.10	-30.19	
Total valid votes		21,255	99.96		
Total rejected ballots		9	0.04	+0.04	
Turnout		21,264	135.85	+36.71	
Eligible voters		15,653			
Conservative gain from Liberal		Swing		+0.32	
Source: Elections Ontario

1898 Ontario general election
Party	Candidate	Votes	%	±%	Elected
Liberal	Alexander Lumsden	4,793	26.86	-32.54	✓
Conservative	Charles Berkeley Powell	4,548	25.49	2.29	✓
Liberal	George O. O'Keefe	4,539	25.44	–33.96	
Conservative	B. Slattery	3,964	22.21	-0.99	
Total valid votes		17,844	100.00		
Total rejected ballots		–			
Turnout		17,844	99.13	+5.79	
Eligible voters		18,000			
Liberal hold		Swing		–17.41	
Source: Elections Ontario

1894 Ontario general election
Party	Candidate	Votes	%	±%	Elected
Liberal	George O. O'Keefe	3,381	29.99	-33.25	✓
Liberal	Erskine Henry Bronson	3,316	29.41	-33.83	✓
Conservative	Taylor McVeity	2,616	23.20	–	
Independent	Alexander Fraser McIntyre	1,923	17.06	–	
Independent	T. H. Beck	39	0.35	–	
Total valid votes		11,275	99.07		
Total rejected ballots		106	0.93	–0.11	
Turnout		11,381	93.34	+34.68	
Eligible voters		12,193			
Liberal hold		Swing		+0.29	
Source: Elections Ontario

=== 1867–1894 ===
1890 Ontario general election
Party	Candidate	Votes	%	±%
Liberal	Erskine Henry Bronson	3,379	63.24	+9.27
Conservative Equal Rights	D. Donaldson	1,964	36.76	–
Total valid votes		5,343	98.96	
Total rejected ballots		56	1.04	–0.43
Turnout		5,399	58.66	+5.34
Eligible voters		9,204		
Liberal hold		Swing		+4.64
Source: Elections Ontario

1886 Ontario general election
Party	Candidate	Votes	%	±%
Liberal	Erskine Henry Bronson	1,815	53.97	+24.26
Conservative	Patrick Baskerville	1,538	45.73	–2.76
Independent	John Clancy	10	0.30	–
Total valid votes		3,363	98.54	
Total rejected ballots		50	1.47	–0.59
Turnout		3,413	53.32	+1.67
Eligible voters		6,401		
Liberal gain from Conservative		Swing		+13.51
Source: Elections Ontario

1883 Ontario general election
Party	Candidate	Votes	%	±%
Conservative	Patrick Baskerville	1,363	48.49	+8.77
Liberal	W. D. O'Keefe	835	29.70	+7.08
Independent	F. McDougall	613	21.81	–
Total valid votes		2,811	97.94	
Total rejected ballots		59	2.06	+2.06
Turnout		2,870	51.65	+3.65
Eligible voters		5,557		
Conservative hold		Swing		+0.84
Source: Elections Ontario

1879 Ontario general election
Party	Candidate	Votes	%	±%
Conservative	Patrick Baskerville	1,064	39.72	+8.26
Independent	George Samuel May	1,000	37.33	
Liberal	Daniel John O'Donoghue	606	22.62	−45.93
Independent	Pierre St. Jean	5	0.19	
Independent	W.D. O'Keefe	4	0.15	
Total valid votes		2,679	47.99	−6.26
Eligible voters		5,582		
Conservative gain from Liberal		Swing		+8.26
Source: Elections Ontario

1875 Ontario general election
Party	Candidate	Votes	%	±%
Liberal	Daniel John O'Donoghue	852	35.35	−34.37
Liberal	J. P. Featherston	800	33.20	−36.53
Conservative	John O'Connor	758	31.45	
Total valid votes		2,410	54.25	
Eligible voters		4,442		
Liberal hold		Swing		−34.37
Source: Elections Ontario

Ontario provincial by-election, January 18, 1874 Resignation of Richard William Scott
Party	Candidate	Votes	%
Liberal	Daniel John O'Donoghue	882	69.72
Independent	R. Nagle	285	22.53
Independent	T.M. Blasdell	91	7.19
Independent	G.H. Preston	7	0.55
Total valid votes		1,265	100.0
Liberal hold			
Source: History of the Electoral Districts, Legislatures and Ministries of the Province of Ontario

Ontario provincial by-election, January 1872 Ministerial by-election
Party	Candidate	Votes
Liberal	Richard William Scott	Acclaimed
Source: History of the Electoral Districts, Legislatures and Ministries of the Province of Ontario

1871 Ontario general election
Party	Candidate	Votes	%	±%
Liberal	Richard William Scott	574	76.33	+7.57
Conservative	G.H. Preston	178	23.67	−7.57
Turnout		752	27.68	−13.81
Eligible voters		2,717		
Liberal hold		Swing		+7.57
Source: Elections Ontario

1867 Ontario general election
Party	Candidate	Votes	%
Liberal	Richard William Scott	810	68.76
Conservative	Henry J. Friel	368	31.24
Total valid votes		1,178	41.49
Eligible voters		2,839	
Liberal pickup new district.			
Source: Elections Ontario
