= George Samuel May =

Canadian politician from Ontario (1858–1922)

George Samuel May (January 18, 1858 – December 29, 1922) was a merchant and politician in Ontario, Canada. He represented the riding of Ottawa in the Legislative Assembly of Ontario from 1905 to 1908 as a Liberal.

The son of George May and Elizabeth N. Cobb, he was born in Montreal and was educated in Ottawa. In 1884, he married Hattie Elizabeth Taylor. May served 16 years as a member of the Ottawa Public School Board.

== Electoral history ==
1879 Ontario general election: Ottawa
Party	Candidate	Votes	%	±%
Conservative	Patrick Baskerville	1,064	39.72	+8.26
Independent	George Samuel May	1,000	37.33	
Liberal	Daniel John O'Donoghue	606	22.62	−45.93
Independent	Mr. St. Jean	5	0.19	
Independent	W.D. O'Keefe	4	0.15	
Total valid votes		2,679	47.99	−6.26
Eligible voters		5,582		
Conservative gain from Liberal		Swing		+8.26
Source: Elections Ontario
