= George O. O'Keefe =

Canadian politician

MPP
- In office June 26, 1894 – January 28, 1898
- Constituency: Ottawa

Personal details
- Born: February 20, 1849 Malone, New York, U.S.
- Died: November 3, 1918 (aged 69) Carleton, Ottawa, Ontario
- Party: Ontario Liberal Party

George O. O'Keefe (February 20, 1849 – November 3, 1918) was an Ontario businessman and political figure. He represented the riding of Ottawa in the Legislative Assembly of Ontario as a Liberal member from 1894 to 1898.

He was born in Malone, New York in 1849, the son of Irish immigrants, and was educated at Middlebury College in Vermont. O'Keefe was an insurance agent and president of the Ontario Permanent Building and Loan Association at Ottawa. He served on Ottawa city council from 1876 to 1880 and from 1885 to 1889. He ran unsuccessfully for a seat in the provincial assembly in 1883. He died November 3, 1918, at Ottawa.
