= Donald Joseph McDougal =

Lawyer and politician in Canada

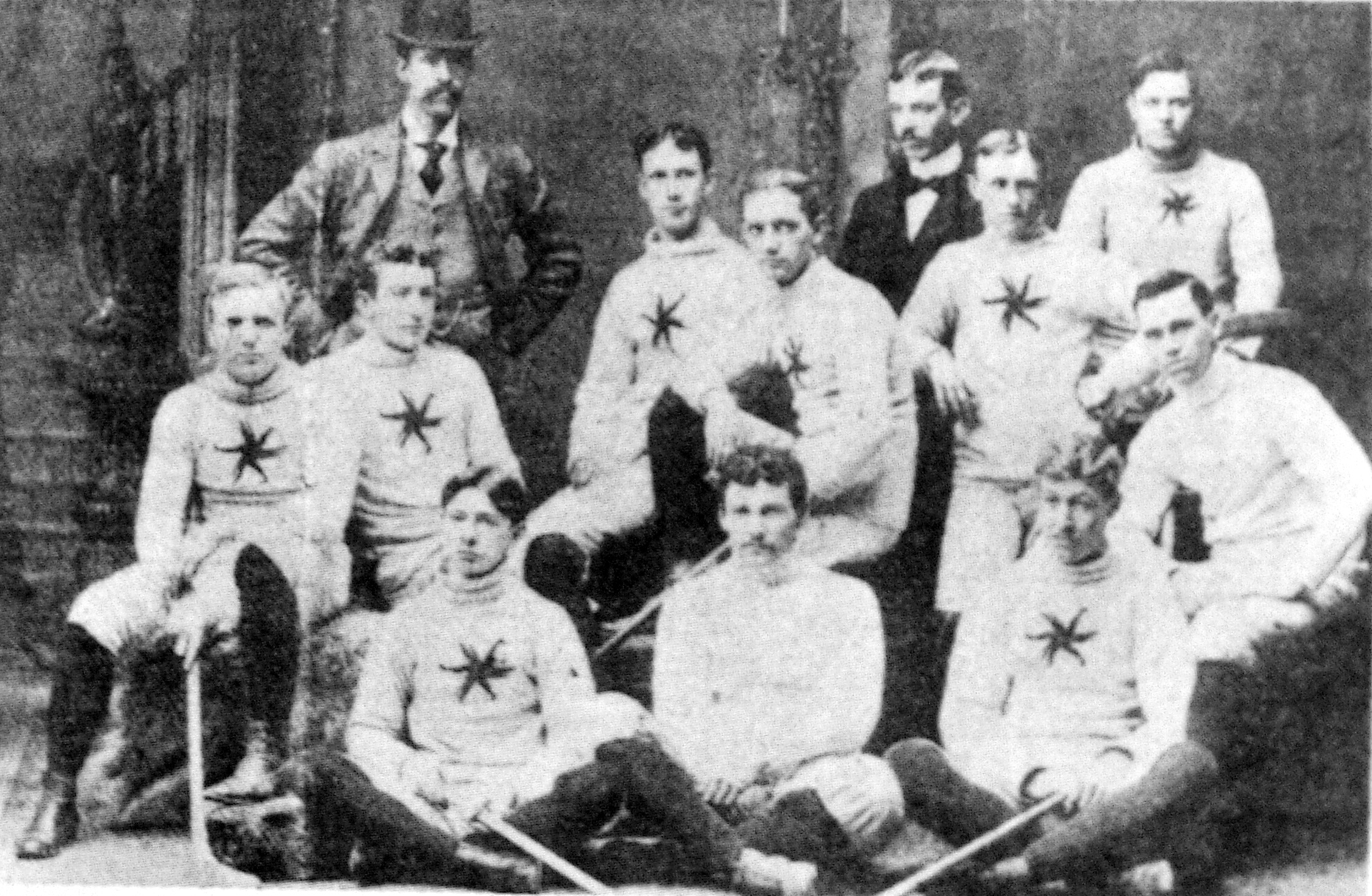
McDougal sitting far right with the 1895 Ottawa Hockey Club.

Donald Archibald Joseph Pius McDougal (October 29, 1872 – November 3, 1942) was a lawyer and politician in Ontario, Canada. He represented the riding of Ottawa from 1905 to 1908 and Ottawa East from 1908 to 1911 in the Legislative Assembly of Ontario as a Liberal.

The son of Francis McDougal and Amelia McGillis, he was born in Ottawa and was educated at the University of Ottawa and Osgoode Hall Law School. He served as an Ottawa alderman for one year.

He died in Ottawa at the age of 70.

During the early to mid 1890s McDougal was active as an athlete on the Ottawa Hockey Club and as a football player on the Ottawa College team.
