= Ottawa Trades Council =

- Formation: December 19, 1872
- Dissolved: 1877
- Type: Labour union
- Legal status: historical
- Headquarters: Ottawa, Ontario, Canada
- Region served: Canada
- Official language: English, French

Ottawa Trades Council was the first local labour central body established to unite workers in the city of Ottawa, Canada.

== History ==
It was founded on December 19, 1872, at the St. Lawrence Hotel. The executive had representation from the bricklayers and masons, limestone cutters, plasterers, and the typographical union. This meeting of Ottawa's unions was the result of a contractor who left town leaving his workers unpaid. A pro-union paper, the Ontario Workman, reported that "By this action, you will observe that the trades men of the capital mean business, as regards the steps necessary to be taken towards the making of a lien law a fact in this Dominion".

The new Ottawa council pressed for the Mechanics Lien Act in Ontario to guarantee wages. The Ottawa and Hamilton Labour Councils joined forces with the Toronto Trades Council to obtain this new law. Buoyed by its success it initiated the first official labour meeting with a Canadian Prime Minister in 1873. It took part in the formation of the first national central labour body, the Canadian Labour Union in 1873 and hosted its second convention in 1874 at the Parliament Buildings in Ottawa. In 1874 the council's president, Daniel O'Donoghue, was elected to the Ontario Legislature. An economic depression in the 1870s resulted in the demise of much the Ottawa and Canada Labour movement and the Ottawa Trades Council also fell victim. There is no trace of it after 1877.
