= Alexander Lumsden =

Canadian politician

Alexander Lumsden (October 4, 1843 – August 5, 1904) was an Ontario lumber merchant and political figure. He represented the riding of Ottawa in the Legislative Assembly of Ontario from 1898 to 1902 as a Liberal member.

He was born in New Edinburgh, Canada West, the son of John Lumsden, and educated at the Ottawa Collegiate Institute. He married Margaret Duncan. He worked for lumbermen Joseph Merrill Currier and James MacLaren before going into business on his own in 1881. Lumsden acquired timber limits in Témiscaming, Québec, Canada region and also owned lumber mills and a fleet of steamships in that region. After his death, his son John took over the operation of the business.
