= Charles Berkeley Powell =

Canadian politician

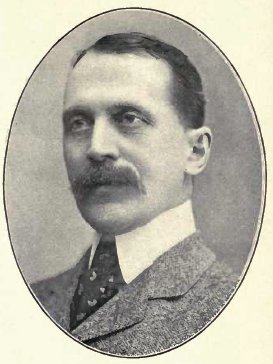

Member of the Legislative Assembly of Ontario
- In office March 1, 1898 – December 13, 1904
- Constituency: Ottawa

Personal details
- Born: August 19, 1858 Port Dover, Canada West
- Died: 1933
- Party: Conservative

Charles Berkeley Powell (August 19, 1858 – 1933) was an Ontario businessman and political figure. He represented the riding of Ottawa in the Legislative Assembly of Ontario from 1898 to 1904 as a Conservative member.

He was born in Port Dover, the son of Colonel Walker Powell, and educated at Galt College and McGill University. He apprenticed as a machinist with the Grand Trunk Railway and became a mechanical engineer. Powell served on the city council for Ottawa. He became a partner in the lumber firm of Pattee and Perley. He married Helen Louise Pattee.
