= William Abram Kribs =

Canadian politician

William Abram Kribs (February 27, 1859 – October 27, 1943) was an Ontario merchant and political figure. He represented Waterloo South in the Legislative Assembly of Ontario from 1898 to 1904 as a Conservative member.

He was born in Hespeler, Canada West, the son of Lewis Kribs. He took over the operation of his father's flour mills and sawmills. He also built a number of buildings in the area near Hespeler as a general contractor. He went on to manufacture warehouse trucks and washing machines. In 1895, Kribs served as warden for Waterloo County. He was also reeve for Hespeler from 1888 to 1896 and mayor from 1914 to 1915. Kribs served as sheriff for Waterloo County from 1926 to 1934. He died in Hespeler.
