= Dennis Murphy (Canadian politician) =

Canadian politician

Denis Murphy (April 2, 1842 – March 10, 1917 ) was an Ontario businessman and political figure. He represented the riding of Ottawa in the Legislative Assembly of Ontario as Conservative member from 1902 to 1904. His first name appears as Dennis in some sources. There is some question as to what year he was born. His gravestone says he was born in 1840, but his obituary in The Ottawa Evening Citizen newspaper, Monday, March 12, 1917, said he was born in 1842. He is buried in Notre Dame Cemetery, Ottawa, Ontario, Canada.

He was born in County Cork, Ireland, the son of Jeremiah Murphy and Ellen Sullivan, and was educated in Chatham, Argenteuil County, Canada East. He and his family moved to Canada in 1849, locating at Greece's Point, on the Grenville Canal, in the province of Quebec. In 1865, he worked as captain on one of the Montreal and Ottawa Forwarding Company's steamers, then was appointed business manager of the Ottawa branch of the company. In 1880, he formed a partnership in the D. Murphy and Company, which mainly transported lumber and coal on the Ottawa River and Rideau Canal. In 1869, he married Annie Patterson.

Murphy operated and was president of a business transporting goods in the Ottawa area called the Ottawa Transportation Company, founded in 1892. He was president of the Canadian Railway Accident Insurance Company and a Commissioner of the Temiskaming and Northern Ontario Railway (now Ontario Northland), from 1905 until his death. Also, he was president of the Ottawa Board of Trade, major shareholder in the Ottawa Electric Railway, director of numerous companies including: Bank of Ottawa, Ottawa Gas Company, C. C. Ray Company, Canada Cement Company (now part of Lafarge Canada), Shawinigan Water and Power Company, Nipissing Mining Company, Brunette Saw Mill Company and Capital Trust Company. In the past he was president of the C. Ross Company, Montreal Terminal Railway Company (now the Société de transport de Montréal) and the Chateauguay and Northern Railway Company.

Denis Murphy lived at 254 Melcalfe Street, Ottawa, in a house he called Tara Hall, next to Booth House, home of lumber baron John Rudolphus Booth. He and his wife Annie (Patterson), who was born in Ottawa, had 5 children, one died as an infant. His children were Colonel George Patterson Murphy, Nellie Murphy Warwick, Lillian Murphy, and Hilda Murphy Perry.

Nellie Murphy, married George R. Warwick, of Toronto in 1894. They lived in Toronto at 178 St. George Street. George R. Warwick was president of Warwick Bros. & Rutter Ltd., from about 1898, a bookbinding and paper goods company founded in 1848, which was one of Canada's largest picture postcard companies from about 1903 to 1916.

Annie Patterson Murphy, Denis Murphy's widow died in 1933, and is buried in Beechwood Cemetery, in Ottawa.
