= 1914 Ontario general election =

Canadian provincial election

- June 29, 1914

111 seats in the 14th Legislative Assembly of Ontario 56 seats were needed for a majority
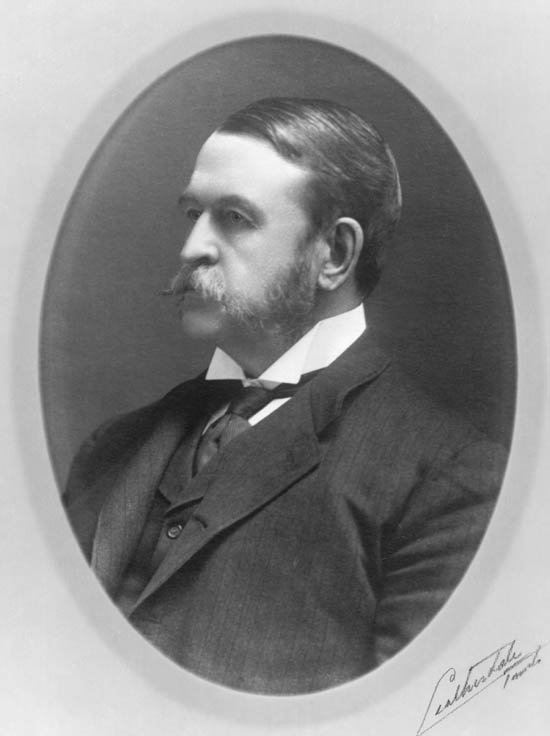

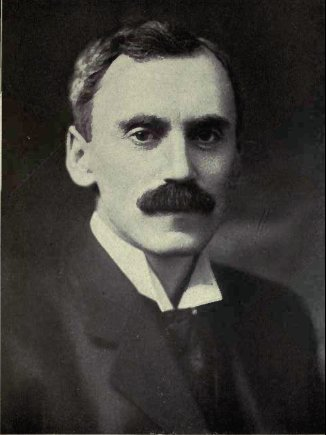
	First party	Second party
Leader	James P. Whitney	Newton Rowell
Party	Conservative	Liberal
Leader since	1896	1911
Leader's seat	Dundas	Oxford North
Last election	83	22
Seats won	84	24
Seat change	▲1	▲2
Percentage	55.3%	38.6%
Swing	▼0.3pp	▲0.1pp
Premier before election
James P. Whitney
Conservative
Premier after election
James P. Whitney
Conservative

The 1914 Ontario general election was the 14th general election held in the province of Ontario, Canada. It was held on June 29, 1914, to elect the 111 Members of the 14th Legislative Assembly of Ontario (MLAs).

The Ontario Conservative Party, led by Sir James P. Whitney, won a fourth consecutive term in government. Whitney died three months after the election and was succeeded by William Howard Hearst. The Conservatives contested 109 of the 111 ridings, deciding not to have candidates stand in Glengarry (where the Liberal Hugh Munro was acclaimed) and Norfolk North (where the Liberal incumbent Thomas Robert Atkinson was up against a Liberal anti-Temperance candidate). However, dissension within the Tory ranks resulted in a significant number of them campaigning as either independent or temperance candidates.

The Ontario Liberal Party, led by Newton Rowell, formed the official opposition.

Independent Labour MLA Allan Studholme was re-elected in Hamilton East. He had held the seat since a 1906 by-election.

The campaign was seen to turn more significantly on the matter of Regulation 17 (which limited instruction in French-language Catholic separate schools), in comparison to temperance issues, and that worked against the Liberals, who placed Prohibition of sales in bars and clubs as a main plank in their platform.

== Expansion of the Legislative Assembly ==
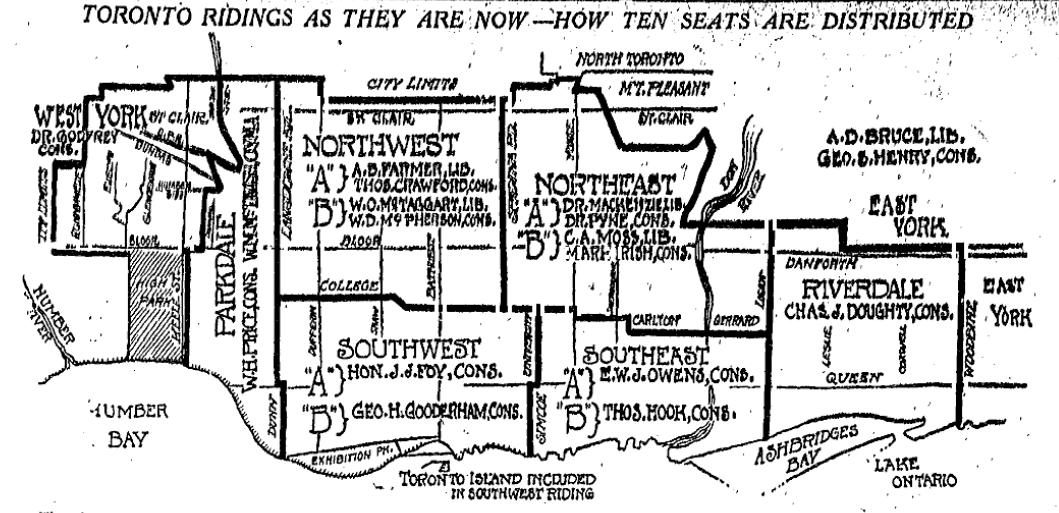
Toronto ridings, as constituted in 1914

An Act passed prior to the election expanded the number of members from 106 to 111, and the number of ridings from 103 to 107. The following changes were made:

- Windsor was spun off from Essex North
- Monck was merged with Lincoln, and St. Catharines was withdrawn
- Niagara Falls was withdrawn from Welland
- Cochrane was carved out from Timiskaming
- In Bruce County, the three ridings were reorganized:

- The Township of Kinloss was withdrawn from Bruce South
- Bruce North gained the Township of Elderslie, while those of Bruce and Saugeen were withdrawn
- As a consequence, Bruce Centre was reconstituted as Bruce West

- In Victoria County, Victoria East and Victoria West were reorganized into Victoria North and Victoria South
- In Toronto, the ridings of Toronto East, Toronto North, Toronto South and Toronto West were replaced:

- Toronto Northeast, Toronto Northwest, Toronto Southeast and Toronto Southwest were constituted as two-member constituencies
- Parkdale and Riverdale were created as single-member constituencies

The Patricia Portion acquired in 1912 was divided between Cochrane and Kenora.

== Electoral system ==
Most seats filled using first past the post voting in single-member districts.

The eight Toronto MPPs were elected in four two-seat districts where each seat was filled in a separate first past the post contest.

== Results ==
Elections to the 14th Parliament of Ontario (1914)
Political party	Party leader	MPPs					Votes		
Political party	Party leader	Candidates	1911	Dissol.	1914	±	#	%	± (pp)
Conservative	James P. Whitney	109	82		84	2▲	268,548	54.02%	1.57▼
Liberal	Newton Rowell	90	22		24	2▲	186,168	37.45%	1.06▼
Labour		4	1		1	Steady	6,535	1.31%	1.12▼
Independent-Liberal		2	–	–	1	1▲	2,236	0.45%	New
Temperance		9	–	–	–		13,064	2.63%	New
Liberal-Temperance		1	–	–	1	1▲	2,733	0.55%	New
Conservative-Temperance		2	–	–	–		2,222	0.45%	0.02▲
Prohibitionist		1	–	–	–		1,302	0.26%	New
Liberal–Conservative			1		–	1▼	Did not campaign		
Independent		5	–	–	–		4,837	0.97%	0.07▲
Socialist		12	–	–	–		4,532	0.91%	0.04▲
Independent-Conservative		4	–	–	–		4,270	0.86%	0.11▼
Liberal-Anti-Temperance		1	–	–	–		691	0.14%	New
Vacant									
Total		240	106	106	111		497,138	100.00%	
Blank and invalid ballots							7,304		
Registered voters / turnout							697,935	72.28%	8.02▲

Seats and popular vote by party
Party	Seats	Votes	Change (pp)
Conservative	84 / 111	54.02%	-1.57
Liberal	24 / 111	37.45%	-1.06
Temperance factions	1 / 111	3.89%	3.86
Other	2 / 111	4.64%	-1.23

=== Synopsis of results ===
Results by riding - 1914 Ontario general election
Riding	Winning party						Turnout	Votes									
Name (Note: order is as given in EO reports)	1911	Party	Votes	Share	Margin #	Margin %	Turnout	Con	Lib	Temp	Lab	Soc	I-Lib	I-Con	LAT	Ind	Total
Addington	Con	Con	1,841	78.27%	1,330	59.70%	71.18%	1,841	–	511	–	–	–	–	–	–	2,352
Algoma	Con	Con	1,959	56.50%	451	13.01%	65.22%	1,959	1,508	–	–	–	–	–	–	–	3,467
Brant North	Con	Lib	1,987	50.62%	49	1.25%	77.56%	1,938	1,987	–	–	–	–	–	–	–	3,925
Brant South	Con	Lib	3,594	52.50%	342	5.00%	73.48%	3,252	3,594	–	–	–	–	–	–	–	6,846
Brockville	Con	Con	1,768	49.08%	466	12.94%	70.40%	1,768	472	1,302	–	60	–	–	–	–	3,602
Bruce North	Lib	Lib	1,736	50.10%	7	0.20%	86.41%	1,729	1,736	–	–	–	–	–	–	–	3,465
Bruce South	Lib	Con	1,820	54.77%	317	9.54%	76.76%	1,820	1,503	–	–	–	–	–	–	–	3,323
Bruce West	Lib	Lib	2,153	58.84%	647	17.68%	72.10%	1,506	2,153	–	–	–	–	–	–	–	3,659
Carleton	Con	Con	1,712	75.92%	1,169	51.84%	46.30%	1,712	543	–	–	–	–	–	–	–	2,255
Cochrane	New	Lib	1,197	41.52%	28	0.97%	35.89%	1,169	1,197	–	–	517	–	–	–	–	2,883
Dufferin	Con	Con	2,094	57.48%	545	14.96%	66.68%	2,094	–	1,549	–	–	–	–	–	–	3,643
Dundas	Con	Con	2,212	58.97%	673	17.94%	75.17%	2,212	1,539	–	–	–	–	–	–	–	3,751
Durham East	Con	Con	1,720	58.82%	516	17.65%	72.61%	1,720	–	1,204	–	–	–	–	–	–	2,924
Durham West	Con	Con	1,647	53.63%	223	7.26%	79.77%	1,647	1,424	–	–	–	–	–	–	–	3,071
Elgin East	Con	Con	2,234	54.01%	332	8.03%	77.18%	2,234	1,902	–	–	–	–	–	–	–	4,136
Elgin West	Con	Con	3,386	55.92%	717	11.84%	69.16%	3,386	2,669	–	–	–	–	–	–	–	6,055
Essex North	Con	Lib	2,431	57.58%	640	15.16%	64.26%	1,791	2,431	–	–	–	–	–	–	–	4,222
Essex South	Con	Lib	2,196	50.38%	33	0.76%	77.88%	2,163	2,196	–	–	–	–	–	–	–	4,359
Fort William	Con	Con	2,385	55.63%	483	11.27%	39.75%	2,385	1,902	–	–	–	–	–	–	–	4,287
Frontenac	Con	Con	1,623	55.45%	319	10.90%	64.24%	1,623	–	–	–	–	–	–	–	1,304	2,927
Glengarry	Lib	Lib	acclaimed														
Grenville	Con	Con	2,082	56.42%	474	12.85%	71.28%	2,082	–	–	–	–	–	1,608	–	–	3,690
Grey Centre	Con	Con	2,404	61.47%	897	22.94%	65.52%	2,404	1,507	–	–	–	–	–	–	–	3,911
Grey North	Lib	Con	2,943	56.50%	677	13.00%	68.85%	2,943	2,266	–	–	–	–	–	–	–	5,209
Grey South	Con	Con	2,866	60.78%	1,017	21.57%	69.21%	2,866	1,849	–	–	–	–	–	–	–	4,715
Haldimand	Lib	Con	2,692	53.02%	307	6.05%	81.12%	2,692	2,385	–	–	–	–	–	–	–	5,077
Halton	Con	Con	2,676	53.17%	319	6.34%	74.46%	2,676	2,357	–	–	–	–	–	–	–	5,033
Hamilton East	Lab	Lab	4,496	56.16%	987	12.33%	61.09%	3,509	–	–	4,496	–	–	–	–	–	8,005
Hamilton West	Con	Con	3,361	63.28%	1,411	26.57%	61.36%	3,361	1,950	–	–	–	–	–	–	–	5,311
Hastings East	Con	Con	2,155	63.78%	931	27.55%	67.73%	2,155	1,224	–	–	–	–	–	–	–	3,379
Hastings North	Con	Con	2,247	79.01%	1,650	58.02%	53.77%	2,247	597	–	–	–	–	–	–	–	2,844
Hastings West	Con	Con	2,347	62.67%	949	25.34%	68.31%	2,347	–	–	–	–	–	–	–	1,398	3,745
Huron Centre	Lib	Lib	2,165	53.98%	319	7.95%	77.20%	1,846	2,165	–	–	–	–	–	–	–	4,011
Huron North	Con	Con	2,103	51.59%	130	3.19%	84.14%	2,103	1,973	–	–	–	–	–	–	–	4,076
Huron South	Con	Con	2,159	54.06%	324	8.11%	57.87%	2,159	1,835	–	–	–	–	–	–	–	3,994
Kenora	Con	Con	acclaimed														
Kent East	Lib	Lib	2,566	53.90%	371	7.79%	73.65%	2,195	2,566	–	–	–	–	–	–	–	4,761
Kent West	Con	Con	4,017	50.08%	13	0.16%	76.12%	4,017	4,004	–	–	–	–	–	–	–	8,021
Kingston	Con	Con	2,900	66.94%	1,468	33.89%	72.51%	2,900	1,432	–	–	–	–	–	–	–	4,332
Lambton East	Lib	Con	2,154	50.05%	4	0.09%	81.45%	2,154	2,150	–	–	–	–	–	–	–	4,304
Lambton West	Con	Con	3,924	55.71%	804	11.41%	74.43%	3,924	3,120	–	–	–	–	–	–	–	7,044
Lanark North	Con	Con	1,666	51.88%	121	3.77%	77.60%	1,666	1,545	–	–	–	–	–	–	–	3,211
Lanark South	Con	Con	1,860	53.76%	548	15.84%	66.23%	1,860	1,312	–	288	–	–	–	–	–	3,460
Leeds	Con	Con	2,025	55.75%	418	11.51%	69.93%	2,025	1,607	–	–	–	–	–	–	–	3,632
Lennox	Con	Con	1,485	53.59%	199	7.18%	76.40%	1,485	1,286	–	–	–	–	–	–	–	2,771
Lincoln	Con	Lib	2,051	53.68%	281	7.35%	77.56%	1,770	2,051	–	–	–	–	–	–	–	3,821
London	Con	Con	4,350	57.08%	1,496	19.63%	63.27%	4,350	2,854	–	417	–	–	–	–	–	7,621
Manitoulin	Con	Con	1,163	55.38%	226	10.76%	54.14%	1,163	–	937	–	–	–	–	–	–	2,100
Middlesex East	Lib	Con	2,383	54.68%	408	9.36%	71.90%	2,383	1,975	–	–	–	–	–	–	–	4,358
Middlesex North	Con	Lib	1,989	51.56%	120	3.11%	78.43%	1,869	1,989	–	–	–	–	–	–	–	3,858
Middlesex West	Lib	Lib	1,798	62.30%	710	24.60%	75.04%	1,088	1,798	–	–	–	–	–	–	–	2,886
Muskoka	Con	Con	2,056	63.09%	853	26.17%	63.44%	2,056	1,203	–	–	–	–	–	–	–	3,259
Niagara Falls	New	Con	2,444	54.01%	969	21.41%	66.28%	2,444	1,475	–	–	606	–	–	–	–	4,525
Nipissing	Con	Con	1,638	45.46%	58	1.61%	55.72%	1,638	1,580	–	–	–	–	–	–	385	3,603
Norfolk North	Lib	Lib	1,927	73.61%	1,236	47.21%	58.05%	–	1,927	–	–	–	–	–	691	–	2,618
Norfolk South	Con	Con	1,381	53.24%	168	6.48%	74.20%	1,381	–	1,213	–	–	–	–	–	–	2,594
Northumberland East	Con	Con	2,426	57.50%	633	15.00%	71.39%	2,426	1,793	–	–	–	–	–	–	–	4,219
Northumberland West	Lib	Lib	1,609	52.26%	139	4.51%	83.58%	1,470	1,609	–	–	–	–	–	–	–	3,079
Ontario North	Con	Con	1,877	54.14%	287	8.28%	81.56%	1,877	1,590	–	–	–	–	–	–	–	3,467
Ontario South	Lib	Con	2,772	50.47%	52	0.95%	75.19%	2,772	2,720	–	–	–	–	–	–	–	5,492
Ottawa East	Con	Lib	2,843	53.75%	865	16.35%	64.73%	1,978	2,843	–	–	–	468	–	–	–	5,289
Ottawa West	Con	Lib	5,018	50.54%	108	1.09%	57.43%	4,910	5,018	–	–	–	–	–	–	–	9,928
Oxford North	Lib	Lib	3,048	50.94%	113	1.89%	80.84%	2,935	3,048	–	–	–	–	–	–	–	5,983
Oxford South	Lib	Con	2,582	50.01%	1	0.02%	76.78%	2,582	2,581	–	–	–	–	–	–	–	5,163
Parkdale	New	Con	2,981	55.98%	637	11.96%	58.16%	2,981	–	2,344	–	–	–	–	–	–	5,325
Parry Sound	Con	Con	2,770	58.84%	832	17.67%	56.57%	2,770	1,938	–	–	–	–	–	–	–	4,708
Peel	Con	Con	2,855	56.17%	627	12.34%	73.89%	2,855	2,228	–	–	–	–	–	–	–	5,083
Perth North	Con	Con	3,840	55.19%	1,117	16.05%	76.19%	3,840	2,723	–	–	395	–	–	–	–	6,958
Perth South	Con	Con	2,375	52.31%	210	4.63%	81.94%	2,375	2,165	–	–	–	–	–	–	–	4,540
Peterborough East	Con	Con	1,783	57.76%	479	15.52%	69.57%	1,783	1,304	–	–	–	–	–	–	–	3,087
Peterborough West	Con	Lib	2,587	51.69%	169	3.38%	73.48%	2,418	2,587	–	–	–	–	–	–	–	5,005
Port Arthur	Con	Con	2,219	49.45%	789	17.58%	58.80%	2,219	1,430	–	–	–	–	–	–	838	4,487
Prescott	Lib	I-Lib	1,768	43.01%	349	8.49%	68.21%	924	1,419	–	–	–	1,768	–	–	–	4,111
Prince Edward	Con	Lib	1,943	47.76%	97	2.38%	79.31%	1,846	1,943	–	–	–	–	279	–	–	4,068
Rainy River	L-Con	Con	1,196	60.22%	406	20.44%	53.23%	1,196	790	–	–	–	–	–	–	–	1,986
Renfrew North	Con	Con	2,548	57.76%	685	15.53%	76.39%	2,548	1,863	–	–	–	–	–	–	–	4,411
Renfrew South	Con	Con	acclaimed														
Riverdale	New	Con	3,299	69.06%	1,962	41.07%	55.73%	3,299	–	1,337	–	141	–	–	–	–	4,777
Russell	Lib	Lib	3,851	73.10%	2,434	46.20%	56.99%	1,417	3,851	–	–	–	–	–	–	–	5,268
St. Catharines	New	Con	2,863	68.22%	1,529	36.43%	60.38%	2,863	–	–	1,334	–	–	–	–	–	4,197
Sault Ste. Marie	Con	Con	2,231	60.92%	800	21.85%	52.73%	2,231	1,431	–	–	–	–	–	–	–	3,662
Simcoe Centre	Con	Con	2,247	53.27%	276	6.54%	73.17%	2,247	1,971	–	–	–	–	–	–	–	4,218
Simcoe East	Con	Con	3,293	57.90%	899	15.81%	67.00%	3,293	2,394	–	–	–	–	–	–	–	5,687
Simcoe South	Con	Con	1,447	66.62%	722	33.24%	59.86%	1,447	725	–	–	–	–	–	–	–	2,172
Simcoe West	Con	Con	2,233	66.05%	1,085	32.09%	64.58%	2,233	–	1,148	–	–	–	–	–	–	3,381
Stormont	Con	Con	2,436	51.46%	138	2.92%	69.88%	2,436	2,298	–	–	–	–	–	–	–	4,734
Sturgeon Falls	Lib	Lib	1,650	75.65%	1,119	51.31%	62.51%	531	1,650	–	–	–	–	–	–	–	2,181
Sudbury	Con	Con	2,047	54.78%	357	9.55%	53.61%	2,047	1,690	–	–	–	–	–	–	–	3,737
Timiskaming	Con	Con	2,838	48.45%	731	12.48%	50.34%	2,838	2,107	–	–	–	–	–	–	912	5,857
Toronto Northeast - A	New	Con	5,956	58.25%	1,687	16.50%	58.97%	5,956	4,269	–	–	–	–	–	–	–	10,225
Toronto Northeast - B	New	Con	5,666	55.86%	1,189	11.72%	58.50%	5,666	4,477	–	–	–	–	–	–	–	10,143
Toronto Northwest - A	New	Con	6,153	61.59%	2,315	23.17%	53.24%	6,153	3,838	–	–	–	–	–	–	–	9,991
Toronto Northwest - B	New	Con	5,974	59.86%	2,512	25.17%	41.57%	5,974	3,462	–	–	544	–	–	–	–	9,980
Toronto Southeast - A	New	Con	4,296	71.85%	2,876	48.10%	53.41%	4,296	1,420	–	–	263	–	–	–	–	5,979
Toronto Southeast - B	New	Con	4,362	73.36%	2,778	46.72%	53.41%	4,362	1,584	–	–	–	–	–	–	–	5,946
Toronto Southwest - A	New	Con	6,127	68.84%	3,696	47.61%	52.45%	6,127	2,431	–	–	342	–	–	–	–	8,900
Toronto Southwest - B	New	Con	6,509	72.32%	4,018	48.15%	52.76%	6,509	2,491	–	–	–	–	–	–	–	9,000
Victoria North	New	Con	1,474	59.36%	465	18.73%	52.67%	1,474	–	1,009	–	–	–	–	–	–	2,483
Victoria South	New	Con	2,232	55.48%	545	13.55%	74.50%	2,232	1,687	–	–	104	–	–	–	–	4,023
Waterloo North	Con	Con	3,787	56.40%	1,454	21.65%	69.35%	3,787	–	2,333	–	595	–	–	–	–	6,715
Waterloo South	Con	Con	3,251	50.73%	856	13.36%	66.55%	3,251	2,395	–	–	762	–	–	–	–	6,408
Welland	Con	Con	2,541	59.90%	840	19.80%	63.89%	2,541	–	1,701	–	–	–	–	–	–	4,242
Wellington East	Lib	Lib	1,946	55.05%	357	10.10%	75.49%	1,589	1,946	–	–	–	–	–	–	–	3,535
Wellington South	Con	L-Tmp	2,733	49.11%	104	1.87%	76.42%	2,629	–	2,733	–	203	–	–	–	–	5,565
Wellington West	Con	Con	1,720	52.20%	145	4.40%	76.80%	1,720	1,575	–	–	–	–	–	–	–	3,295
Wentworth North	Lib	Con	1,586	50.33%	21	0.67%	78.05%	1,586	1,565	–	–	–	–	–	–	–	3,151
Wentworth South	Con	Con	1,704	55.72%	350	11.45%	71.28%	1,704	1,354	–	–	–	–	–	–	–	3,058
Windsor	New	Lib	2,309	42.59%	398	7.34%	59.38%	3,112 (Note: Joseph Octave Reaume, previously in Essex North, failed to receive his party's nomination for the new riding. He campaigned anyway under the Conservative banner, and received 1,911 votes.)	2,309	–	–	–	–	–	–	–	5,421
York East	Con	Con	3,671	56.51%	846	13.02%	58.62%	3,671	2,825	–	–	–	–	–	–	–	6,496
York North	Con	Con	2,826	52.42%	261	4.84%	81.09%	2,826	2,565	–	–	–	–	–	–	–	5,391
York West	Con	Con	acclaimed														

= open seat
= turnout is above provincial average
= winning candidate was in previous Legislature
= incumbent had switched allegiance
= previously incumbent in another riding
= not incumbent; was previously elected to the Legislature
= incumbency arose from byelection gain
= incumbency arose from prior election result being overturned by the court
= other incumbents renominated
= joint Conservative candidate
= Prohibition candidate
= joint Liberal candidate
= previously an MP in the House of Commons of Canada
= multiple candidates

=== Analysis ===
Party candidates in 2nd place
Party in 1st place	Party in 2nd place										Total
Party in 1st place	Accl	Con	Lib	Lab	Temp	C-Tmp	Ind	I-Con	Proh	LAT	Total
Conservative	3		65	1	9	2	2	1	1		84
Liberal	1	22								1	24
Labour		1									1
Independent Liberal			1								1
Liberal-Temperance		1									1
Total	4	24	66	1	9	2	2	1	1	1	111

Candidates ranked 1st to 4th place, by party
Parties	Accl	1st	2nd	3rd	4th
█ Conservative	3	81	24	2	
█ Liberal	1	23	66	1	
█ Labour		1	1	2	
█ Independent Liberal		1		1	
█ Liberal-Temperance		1			
█ Temperance			9		
█ Independent			2	3	
█ Conservative-Temperance			2		
█ Independent Conservative			1	1	
█ Liberal Anti-Temperance			1		
█ Prohibitionist			1		
█ Socialist				11	1

Resulting composition of the 10th Legislative Assembly of Ontario
Source		Party					
Source		Con	Lib	Lab	I-Lib	L-Tmp	Total
Seats retained	Incumbents returned	52	9	1			62
Seats retained	Acclamations	3	1				4
Seats retained	Open seats held	6	2				8
Seats changing hands	Incumbents defeated	4	6			1	11
Seats changing hands	Open seats gained	2	4				6
Seats changing hands	Byelection gains held	2					2
Seats changing hands	Incumbent changed allegiance	1			1		2
New seats	New MLAs	6	2				8
New seats	Previously incumbent	8					8
Total		84	24	1	1	1	111

=== Results summary by region ===
Distribution of seats and popular vote %, by party by region (1914)
Region	Candidates										Seats					Vote share (%)								
Region	Con	Lib	Temp	Soc	Ind	Lab	Ind-Con	Ind-Lib	Lib-Anti-T	Total	Con	Lib	Lab	Ind-Lib	L-Temp	Con	Lib	Temp	Lab	Ind	Soc	Ind-Lib	Ind-Con	Lib-Anti-T
Northern Ontario	12	10	1	1	3	–	–	–	–	27	10	2	–	–	–	50.66%	39.96%	2.45%	–	5.58%	1.35%	–	–	–
Ottawa Valley	9	8	–	–	–	1	–	2	–	20	5	3	–	1	–	44.86%	48.49%	–	0.76%	–	–	5.89%	–	–
St Lawrence Valley	6	6	1	1	–	–	1	–	–	15	6	1	–	–	–	56.54%	30.95%	5.48%	–	–	0.25%	–	6.77%	–
Georgian Bay	8	7	1	–	–	–	–	–	–	16	7	1	–	–	–	58.31%	38.11%	3.58%	–	–	–	–	–	–
Central Ontario	15	10	3	1	2	–	1	–	–	32	12	3	–	–	–	57.45%	30.92%	5.45%	–	5.41%	0.21%	–	0.56%	–
Wentworth-Halton-Niagara	9	6	1	1	–	2	–	–	–	19	7	1	1	–	–	54.31%	26.01%	4.11%	14.10%	–	1.47%	–	–	–
Midwestern Ontario	21	18	4	4	–	–	–	–	1	48	14	7	–	–	1	50.49%	39.09%	7.78%	–	–	1.94%	–	–	0.69%
Southwestern Ontario	14	13	–	–	–	1	–	–	–	28	7	6	–	–	–	51.70%	47.67%	–	0.62%	–	–	–	–	–
Peel-York-Ontario	6	5	–	–	–	–	–	–	–	11	6	–	–	–	–	54.00%	46.00%	–	–	–	–	–	–	–
Toronto	10	8	2	4	–	–	–	–	–	24	10	–	–	–	–	63.94%	29.87%	4.59%	–	–	1.61%	–	–	–
Total	110	91	13	12	5	4	2	2	1	240	84	24	1	1	1	54.40%	37.54%	3.89%	1.31%	0.97%	0.91%	0.45%	0.38%	0.14%

=== MLAs elected by region and riding ===
Party designations are as follows:

Conservative
Liberal
Labour

Italicized names indicate members returned by acclamation.

Northern Ontario

Algoma: Albert Grigg
Cochrane: Malcolm Lang
Fort William: Charles William Jarvis
Kenora: Harold Arthur Clement Machin
Manitoulin: Robert Roswell Gamey
Nipissing: Henri Morel
Port Arthur: Donald McDonald Hogarth
Rainy River: James Arthur Mathieu
Sault Ste. Marie: William Howard Hearst
Sturgeon Falls: Zotique Mageau
Sudbury: Charles McCrea
Timiskaming: Thomas Magladery

Ottawa Valley

Carleton: Robert Herbert McElroy
Lanark North: Richard Franklin Preston
Lanark South: Francis William Hall
Ottawa East: Joseph Albert Pinard
Ottawa West: George Charles Hurdman
Prescott: Gustave Évanturel (I-Lib)
Renfrew North: Edward Arunah Dunlop
Renfrew South: Thomas William McGarry
Russell: Damase Racine

Saint Lawrence Valley

Brockville: Albert Edward Donovan
Dundas: James Pliny Whitney
Glengarry: Hugh Munro
Grenville: George Howard Ferguson
Kingston: Arthur Edward Ross
Leeds: John Robertson Dargavel
Stormont: Robert Austin Shearer

Georgian Bay

Bruce North: William MacDonald
Grey North: Colin Stewart Cameron
Muskoka: Samuel Henry Armstrong
Parry Sound: Joseph Edgar
Simcoe Centre: Alfred Burke Thompson
Simcoe East: James Irwin Hartt
Simcoe South: Alexander Ferguson
Simcoe West: James Stoddart Duff

Central Ontario

Addington: William David Black
Durham East: Josiah Johnston Preston
Durham West: John Henry Devitt
Frontenac: Anthony McGuin Rankin
Hastings East: Sandy Grant
Hastings North: John Robert Cooke
Hastings West: John Wesley Johnson
Lennox: Thomas George Carscallen
Northumberland East: Samuel Greerson Nesbitt
Northumberland West: Samuel Clarke
Peterborough East: James Thompson
Peterborough West: George Alexander Gillespie
Prince Edward: Nelson Parliament
Victoria North: Robert Mercer Mason
Victoria South: John Carew

Wentworth/Halton/Niagara

Halton: Alfred Westland Nixon
Hamilton East: Allan Studholme
Hamilton West: John Strathearn Hendrie
Lincoln: Thomas A. Marshall
Niagara Falls: George Musgrove
St. Catharines: Elisha Jessop
Welland: Donald Sharpe
Wentworth North: Arthur Frederick Rykert
Wentworth South: James Thomas Hammill Regan

Midwestern Ontario

Brant: Thomas Scott Davidson
Brant South: Joseph Henry Ham
Bruce South: Wellington David Cargill
Bruce West: Charles Martin Bowman
Dufferin: Charles Robert McKeown
Grey Centre: Isaac Benson Lucas
Grey South: David Jamieson
Haldimand: William Jaques
Huron Centre: William Proudfoot
Huron North: Armstrong Musgrove
Huron South: Henry Eilber
Norfolk North: Thomas Robert Atkinson
Norfolk South: Arthur Clarence Pratt
Oxford North: Newton Wesley Rowell
Oxford South: Victor Albert Sinclair
Perth North: James Torrance
Perth South: John Benneweis
Waterloo North: Charles Henry Mills
Waterloo South: Zachariah Adam Hall
Wellington East: Udney Richardson
Wellington South: Samuel Carter (Lib-Temp)
Wellington West: William Clarke Chambers

Southwestern Ontario

Elgin East: Charles Andrew Brower
Elgin West: Findlay George MacDiarmid
Essex North: Severin Ducharme
Essex South: Lambert Peter Wigle
Kent East: Walter Renwick Ferguson
Kent West: George William Sulman
Lambton East: John Burton Martyn
Lambton West: William John Hanna
London: Adam Beck
Middlesex East: John McFarlan
Middlesex North: John Grieve
Middlesex West: John Campbell Elliott
Windsor: James Craig Tolmie

Peel/York/Ontario

Ontario North: William Henry Hoyle
Ontario South: Charles Calder
Peel: James Robinson Fallis
York East: George Stewart Henry
York North: Thomas Herbert Lennox
York West: Forbes Godfrey

Toronto

Parkdale: William Herbert Price
Riverdale: Joseph Russell
Toronto Northeast - A: Robert Allan Pyne
Toronto Northeast - B: Mark Howard Irish
Toronto Northwest - A: Thomas Crawford
Toronto Northwest - B: William David McPherson
Toronto Southeast - A: Edward William James Owens
Toronto Southeast - B: Thomas Hook
Toronto Southwest - A: James Joseph Foy
Toronto Southwest - B: George Horace Gooderham

=== Reorganization of ridings ===
The newly created ridings returned the following MLAs:

1911		1914		
Riding	Party	Riding		Party
Essex North	█ Conservative	Essex North		█ Liberal
Essex North	█ Conservative	Windsor		█ Liberal
Monck	█ Liberal	Lincoln		█ Liberal
Lincoln	█ Conservative	Lincoln		█ Liberal
Withdrawn from Lincoln		St. Catharines		█ Conservative
Welland	█ Conservative	Niagara Falls		█ Conservative
Welland	█ Conservative	Welland		█ Conservative
Timiskaming	█ Conservative	Timiskaming		█ Conservative
Timiskaming	█ Conservative	Cochrane		█ Liberal
Bruce Centre	█ Liberal	Bruce West		█ Liberal
Toronto ridings: Toronto East; Toronto North; Toronto South; Toronto West	█ Conservative (8 MLAs)	Parkdale		█ Conservative
Toronto ridings: Toronto East; Toronto North; Toronto South; Toronto West	█ Conservative (8 MLAs)	Riverdale		█ Conservative
Toronto ridings: Toronto East; Toronto North; Toronto South; Toronto West	█ Conservative (8 MLAs)	Toronto Northeast	A	█ Conservative
Toronto ridings: Toronto East; Toronto North; Toronto South; Toronto West	█ Conservative (8 MLAs)	Toronto Northeast	B	█ Conservative
Toronto ridings: Toronto East; Toronto North; Toronto South; Toronto West	█ Conservative (8 MLAs)	Toronto Northwest	A	█ Conservative
Toronto ridings: Toronto East; Toronto North; Toronto South; Toronto West	█ Conservative (8 MLAs)	Toronto Northwest	B	█ Conservative
Toronto ridings: Toronto East; Toronto North; Toronto South; Toronto West	█ Conservative (8 MLAs)	Toronto Southeast	A	█ Conservative
Toronto ridings: Toronto East; Toronto North; Toronto South; Toronto West	█ Conservative (8 MLAs)	Toronto Southeast	B	█ Conservative
Toronto ridings: Toronto East; Toronto North; Toronto South; Toronto West	█ Conservative (8 MLAs)	Toronto Southwest	A	█ Conservative
Toronto ridings: Toronto East; Toronto North; Toronto South; Toronto West	█ Conservative (8 MLAs)	Toronto Southwest	B	█ Conservative

=== Seats that changed hands ===
Elections to the 12th Parliament of Ontario – unaltered seats won/lost by party, 1911–1914
Party	1911	Gain from (loss to)												1914
Party	1911	Con		Lib		Lab		I-Lib		L-Tmp		L-Con		1914
Conservative	71			8	(8)						(1)	1		71
Liberal	20	8	(8)						(1)					19
Labour	1													1
Independent-Liberal (Note: Gustave Évanturel (Prescott) was originally elected as a Liberal in 1911.)	–			1										1
Liberal-Temperance	–	1												1
Liberal–Conservative (Note: James Arthur Mathieu (Rainy River) campaigned as a Conservative and won.)	1		(1)											–
Total	93	9	(9)	9	(9)	–	–	–	(1)	–	(1)	1	–	93

There were 20 seats that changed allegiance in the election:

Liberal to Conservative

- Bruce South
- Grey North
- Haldimand
- Lambton East
- Middlesex East
- Ontario South
- Oxford South
- Wentworth North

Liberal to Independent-Liberal

- Prescott

Liberal-Conservative to Conservative

- Rainy River

Conservative to Liberal

- Brant
- Brant South
- Essex South
- Middlesex North
- Ottawa East
- Ottawa West
- Peterborough West
- Prince Edward

Conservative to Liberal-Temperance

- Wellington South

=== Acclamations ===
Candidates returned by acclamation
Party	Riding	Candidate
Conservative	Kenora	Harold Arthur Clement Machin
Conservative	Renfrew South	Thomas William McGarry
Conservative	York West	Forbes Godfrey
Liberal	Glengarry	Hugh Munro

When nominations closed, three candidates were acclaimed. A later withdrawal in Kenora enabled the acclamation of Harold Arthur Clement Machin.

Forbes Godfrey (York West) was acclaimed because the Liberal candidate was held to have missed the deadline by one minute. In Wellington East, the Liberals opted not to press a similar case against the Conservative candidate, whose nomination papers were filed 90 minutes after the deadline.

== See also ==
- Politics of Ontario
- list of Ontario political parties
- Premier of Ontario
- Leader of the Opposition (Ontario)
