= Arthur Roebuck =

Canadian politician

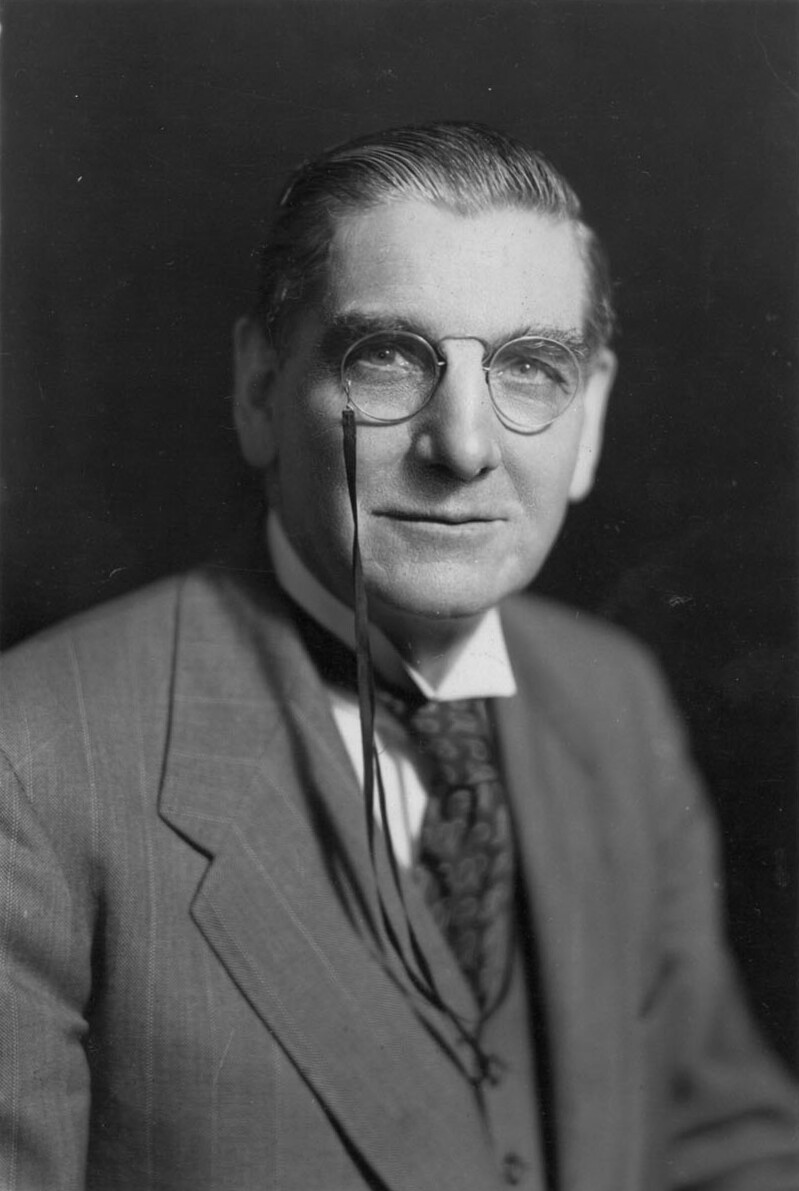
- Roebuck, c. 1940s

Canadian Senator from Ontario
- In office 1945–1971
- Constituency: Toronto-Trinity

Member of Parliament for Trinity
- In office 1940–1945
- Preceded by: Hugh John Plaxton
- Succeeded by: Larry Skey

Ontario MPP
- In office 1934–1940
- Preceded by: Thomas Bell
- Succeeded by: A.A. MacLeod
- Constituency: Bellwoods

Personal details
- Born: February 28, 1878 Hamilton, Ontario, Canada
- Died: November 17, 1971 (aged 93) Cobourg, Ontario, Canada
- Party: Liberal
- Relations: John Roebuck, great-great grandfather
- Occupation: Politician; journalist; lawyer

Arthur Wentworth Roebuck, QC, (February 28, 1878 – November 17, 1971) was a Canadian politician and labour lawyer.

== Background ==
Roebuck was born in Hamilton, Ontario in 1878 and grew up on a farm in Wellington County, near Guelph. He worked as a reporter for the Toronto Daily Star and in 1905 became owner/editor of the Temiskaming Herald in New Liskeard and the Cobalt Citizen. He sold them in 1915 when he left to study law, graduating from Osgoode Hall after three years. In 1918, he married Inez Perry and together they raised one daughter.

== Political career ==
=== Provincial ===
Roebuck ran as a Liberal candidate in Temiskaming in the 1911 Ontario general election and the 1914 Ontario general election but failed to get elected. He also ran in the 1917 Canadian federal election. He was involved with the United Farmers of Ontario and its successor, the Progressive Party, in the 1920s before rejoining the Liberals. He finally won a seat in the Legislative Assembly of Ontario in the 1934 provincial election that brought the Ontario Liberal Party led by Mitchell Hepburn to power.

Roebuck was a senior figure in the Hepburn government serving as Attorney-General of Ontario from 1934 to 1937 as well as Minister of Labour from 1934 until 1935. A progressive, Roebuck promoted the rights of Jews against the anti-Semitism that was still prevalent in 1930s Ontario, and defended the rights of trade unions. He broke with Hepburn over the government's handling of the 1937 United Auto Workers strike against General Motors in Oshawa, and resigned in protest with fellow minister David Croll. Roebuck remained as the Liberal Member of the Legislative Assembly for the Toronto district of Bellwoods until 1940.

He ran for the leadership of the Ontario Liberal Party at the 1943 Ontario Liberal leadership convention to succeed Hepburn, but finished second to Harry Nixon.

=== Federal ===
Roebuck ran for a seat in the House of Commons of Canada in the 1917 federal election as a Laurier Liberal, but was defeated.

Re-entering federal politics, Roebuck was elected Liberal Member of Parliament for the Toronto riding of Trinity in the 1940 federal election after successfully challenging sitting Liberal MP Hugh Plaxton for the party's nomination.

=== Senate ===
In 1945, he was appointed to the Senate of Canada by Prime Minister William Lyon Mackenzie King, and remained in the Upper House until his death. At the outset of his appointment, he worked with the Canadian Jewish Congress and Rabbi Avraham Aharon Price to have young, Jewish refugees released from internment camps to study in Toronto.

He was an important figure in the civil liberties movement in Canada following the war. Following the Igor Gouzenko Affair, Roebuck opposed the government's suspension of the individual rights of individuals accused of espionage, and criticized the use of the Royal Commission on Espionage's transcripts in court. Later, he participated in the defence of Israel Halperin, one of the accused spies, and chaired the Senate Committee on Human Rights and Fundamental Freedoms in 1950, advocating the creation of a Canadian Bill of Rights.

Roebuck opposed Pierre Elliott Trudeau's Senate reform proposal in 1969.

=== Cabinet posts ===
Hepburn ministry, Province of Ontario (1934–1942)
Cabinet posts (2)
Predecessor	Office	Successor
William Herbert Price	Attorney General; 1934–1937	Gordon Daniel Conant
John Morrow Robb	Minister of Labour; 1934–1935	Mitchell Hepburn

== Archives ==
There are Arthur W. Roebuck fonds at the Archives of Ontario and Library and Archives Canada.
