= Oxford South =

Oxford South could refer to

- Oxford South (federal electoral district)
- Oxford South (provincial electoral district)
