= Toronto South (provincial electoral district) =

Former provincial electoral district in Toronto, Ontario

Ontario electoral district
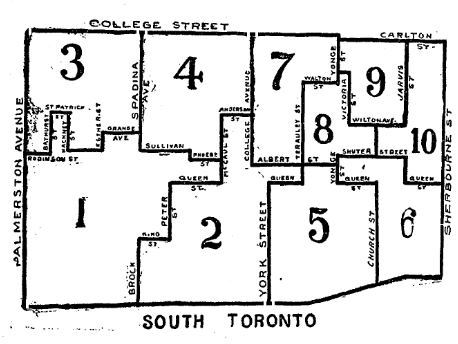
- Toronto South riding, created in 1894

Defunct provincial electoral district
- Legislature: Legislative Assembly of Ontario
- District created: 1894
- District abolished: 1914
- First contested: 1894
- Last contested: 1911

Toronto South, also known as South Toronto, was a provincial riding that was created in Toronto, Ontario in 1894. In 1886, Toronto was represented as one entire riding that elected three members. In 1894 this riding was split into four parts of which Toronto South was one. It occupied the southern part of the old city of Toronto. From 1908 to 1914 it elected two members to the legislature.

In 1914 the Toronto South district was abolished. The districts of Toronto East, Toronto North, Toronto South and Toronto West were replaced by Toronto Northeast, Toronto Northwest, Toronto Southwest and Toronto Southeast, which were constituted as two-member districts. Parkdale and Riverdale were created as single-member constituencies.

== Boundaries ==
The riding was established in 1894. The boundaries were College Street and Carlton Street to the north, Sherbourne Street to the east and Palmerston Avenue to the west. It was bounded on the south by Lake Ontario.

In 1914, the riding was split between the new ridings of Toronto Southeast and Toronto Southwest.

== Members of Provincial Parliament ==
Parliament	Years	Member	Party
Riding created in 1894 from the riding of Toronto
8th	1894–1898	Oliver Howland	Conservative
9th	1898–1902	J.J.Foy (Note: On 21 February 1905, Foy resigned in order to recontest the seat due to his appointment as Commissioner of Crown Lands. This was known as a ministerial by-election.)	Conservative
10th	1902–1905	J.J.Foy	Conservative
11th	1905–1908	J.J.Foy	Conservative
Seat A
12th	1908–1911	J.J.Foy	Conservative
13th	1911–1914	Edward Owens	Conservative
Seat B
12th	1908–1911	George Gooderham	Conservative
13th	1911–1914	George Gooderham	Conservative
		Sourced from the Ontario Legislative Assembly	
Split into Toronto Southeast and Toronto Southwest ridings after 1914

== Election results ==
1894 Ontario general election
Party	Candidate	Votes	Vote %
Conservative	Oliver Howland	6,032	60.2
Liberal	Mr. Moss	3,892	39.8
	Total	10,014	

1898 Ontario general election
Party	Candidate	Votes	Vote %
Conservative	J.J. Foy	4,273	51.7
Liberal	W.B. Rogers	3,996	48.3
	Total	8,269	

1902 Ontario general election
Party	Candidate	Votes	Vote %
Conservative	J.J. Foy	4,983	52.8
Liberal	W.B. Rogers	4,192	44.4
Socialist	Mr. Corner	170	1.8
Socialist-Labour	Mr. James	101	1.1
	Total	9,446	

1905 Ontario general election
Party	Candidate	Votes	Vote %
Conservative	J.J. Foy	5,375	68.3
Liberal	John J. Hunter	2,319	29.5
Socialist	Thomas Phillips Thompson	172	2.2
	Total	7,866	

=== Seat A ===
1908 Ontario general election
Party	Candidate	Votes	Vote %
Conservative	J.J. Foy	5,167	85.6
Labour	Mr. Kennedy	519	8.6
Socialist	Mr. Deinegon	347	5.8
	Total	6,033	

1911 Ontario general election
Party	Candidate	Votes	Vote %
Conservative	Edward Owens	2,358	77.3
Labour	W.R. James	693	22.7
	Total	3,051	

=== Seat B ===
1908 Ontario general election
Party	Candidate	Votes	Vote %
Conservative	George Gooderham	4,996	68.1
Liberal	G.E. Gibbard	2,068	28.2
Socialist	Mr. Tredler	270	3.7
	Total	7,334	

1911 Ontario general election
Party	Candidate	Votes	Vote %
Conservative	George Gooderham	2,421	78.2
Liberal	E. Fielding	673	21.8
	Total	3,094	
