= George Atwell Cooke =

Canadian politician

Ontario MPP
- In office 1884–1886
- Preceded by: Adam Crooks
- Succeeded by: Angus McKay
- Constituency: Oxford South

Personal details
- Born: 1848 Norwich Township, Oxford County, Ontario
- Died: April 1890 (aged 41–42)
- Party: Liberal
- Occupation: Lawyer

George Atwell Cooke (Cook) (1848 - April 1890) was an Ontario lawyer and political figure. He represented Oxford South in the Legislative Assembly of Ontario from 1884 to 1886 as a Liberal member.

He was born in Norwich Township, Oxford County, the son of doctor Ephraim Cook, who came to Upper Canada from Massachusetts in 1830. He was called to the bar in 1876. Cooke was elected to the provincial assembly in an 1884 by-election held after Adam Crooks retired from politics.
