= Bellwoods =

Former provincial electoral district in Ontario, Canada

Ontario electoral district

Defunct provincial electoral district
- Legislature: Legislative Assembly of Ontario
- District created: 1925
- District abolished: 1987
- First contested: 1926
- Last contested: 1985

Bellwoods was a provincial riding in Ontario, Canada, in the old City of Toronto's west-end. It was represented in the Legislative Assembly of Ontario from 1926 until 1987, when it was abolished and redistributed into the Dovercourt, and Fort York districts.

== Boundaries ==
The district was named after Trinity Bellwoods Park, where the original Trinity College campus was located. It was created in 1926 from the Toronto Southwest and Toronto Northwest ridings. The boundaries varied over its 61 years, with its most northern boundary being the city limits just north of St. Clair Avenue. The eastern boundary went as far as Bathurst Street, and its western boundary eventually ended at Dovercourt Road. Bellwoods was demographically a mainly working class district, with a significant immigrant population. As of 2011, the area that Bellwoods represented is divided among the current Davenport, St. Paul's and Trinity—Spadina electoral districts.

== Members of Provincial Parliament ==
Bellwoods
Assembly	Years	Member	Party
Riding created in 1926 from parts of Toronto Southwest and Toronto Northwest
17th	1926–1929	William Edwards	Conservative
18th	1929–1934	Thomas Bell	Conservative
19th	1934–1937	Arthur Roebuck (Note: In 1938, the title of Member of the Legislative Assembly was officially changed to Member of Provincial Parliament. Previously, it was unofficially used in the media and in the Legislature.) (Note: Roebuck resigned March 08, 1940 in order to run for Federal Parliament. The seat remained vacant until the 1943 election.)	Liberal
20th	1937–1943	Arthur Roebuck	Liberal
21st	1943–1945	A. A. MacLeod	Labour-Progressive
22nd	1945–1948	A. A. MacLeod	Labour-Progressive
23rd	1948–1951	A. A. MacLeod	Labour-Progressive
24th	1951–1955	John Yaremko	Progressive Conservative
25th	1955–1959	John Yaremko	Progressive Conservative
26th	1959–1963	John Yaremko	Progressive Conservative
27th	1963–1967	John Yaremko	Progressive Conservative
28th	1967–1971	John Yaremko	Progressive Conservative
29th	1971–1975	John Yaremko	Progressive Conservative
30th	1975–1977	Ross McClellan	New Democratic
31st	1977–1981	Ross McClellan	New Democratic
32nd	1981–1985	Ross McClellan	New Democratic
33rd	1985–1987	Ross McClellan	New Democratic
Sourced from the Ontario Legislative Assembly
Merged into Dovercourt and Fort York after 1987

== Election results ==
=== 1974–1987 electoral boundaries ===
1985 Ontario general election
Party	Candidate	Votes	%	±%
New Democratic	Ross McClellan	8,088	47.49	+6.50
Liberal	Walter Bardyn	6,655	39.08	+1.01
Progressive Conservative	Bento de Sao Jose	1,964	11.53	–6.00
Independent	Ronald G. Rodgers	324	1.90	+0.46
Total valid votes		17,031	99.23	
Total rejected ballots		133	0.77	–0.84
Turnout		17,164	67.09	+8.53
Eligible voters		25,583		
New Democratic hold		Swing		+2.75
Source: Elections Ontario

1981 Ontario general election
Party	Candidate	Votes	%	±%
New Democratic	Ross McClellan	5,111	40.99	–6.78
Liberal	Walter Bardyn	4,746	38.06	+12.29
Progressive Conservative	Tina Gabriel	2,186	17.53	–5.09
Communist	Slyvie Baillargeon	246	1.97	+0.47
Independent	Ronald G. Rodgers	180	1.44	+0.28
Total valid votes		12,469	98.38	
Total rejected ballots		205	1.62	+0.16
Turnout		12,674	58.56	–4.04
Eligible voters		21,642		
New Democratic hold		Swing		–9.54
Source: Elections Ontario

1977 Ontario general election
Party	Candidate	Votes	%	±%
New Democratic	Ross McClellan	6,177	47.77	+9.39
Liberal	Millie Caccia	3,332	25.77	–8.77
Progressive Conservative	Maria Sgro	2,925	22.62	–2.53
Communist	Scarth Heap	194	1.50	–0.42
Libertarian	Grace-Ann Paulson	152	1.18	–
Independent	Ronald G. Rodgers	151	1.17	–
Total valid votes		12,931	98.54	
Total rejected ballots		191	1.46	+0.23
Turnout		13,122	62.60	–2.08
Eligible voters		20,962		
New Democratic hold		Swing		+9.08
Source: Elections Ontario

1975 Ontario general election
Party	Candidate	Votes	%	±%
New Democratic	Ross McClellan	4,935	38.38	+13.35
Liberal	Millie Caccia	4,441	34.54	+11.29
Progressive Conservative	Elio Madonia	3,234	25.15	–26.56
Communist	Richard Orlandini	247	1.92	–
Total valid votes		12,857	98.77	
Total rejected ballots		160	1.23	–0.23
Turnout		13,017	64.67	–5.06
Eligible voters		20,127		
New Democratic gain from Progressive Conservative		Swing		+19.96
Source: Elections Ontario

=== 1967–1974 electoral boundaries ===
1971 Ontario general election
Party	Candidate	Votes	%	±%
Progressive Conservative	John Yaremko	7,443	51.71	+4.37
New Democratic	Helen Roedde	3,604	25.04	+5.92
Liberal	Frank Kennedy	3,347	23.25	–6.79
Total valid votes		14,394	98.54	
Total rejected ballots		213	1.46	–0.57
Turnout		14,607	69.73	+4.99
Eligible voters		20,947		
Progressive Conservative hold		Swing		–0.78
Source: Elections Ontario

1967 Ontario general election
Party	Candidate	Votes	%	±%
Progressive Conservative	John Yaremko	6,647	47.34	–3.64
Liberal	Bill Bassell	4,218	30.04	–3.84
New Democratic	Frank Parrill	2,684	19.12	+3.98
Independent	Ernest E. Barr	491	3.50	–
Total valid votes		14,040	97.98	
Total rejected ballots		290	2.02	+0.02
Turnout		14,330	64.74	+2.76
Eligible voters		22,135		
Progressive Conservative hold		Swing		+0.10
Source: Elections Ontario

=== 1934–1966 electoral boundaries ===
1963 Ontario general election
Party	Candidate	Votes	%	±%
Progressive Conservative	John Yaremko	6,039	50.98	–3.97
Liberal	Jim Mizzoni	4,013	33.88	+10.94
New Democratic	Herbert Hyman	1,793	15.14	–0.87
Total valid votes		11,845	98.00	
Total rejected ballots		242	2.00	+0.07
Turnout		12,087	61.98	+4.31
Eligible voters		19,501		
Progressive Conservative hold		Swing		–7.46
Source: Elections Ontario

1959 Ontario general election
Party	Candidate	Votes	%	±%
Progressive Conservative	John Yaremko	6,408	54.96	+16.53
Liberal	Nicholas Manfredo	2,675	22.94	–13.81
Co-operative Commonwealth	Nicholas Rudisi	1,867	16.01	+2.49
Labor–Progressive	Michael Lucas	710	6.09	–5.21
Total valid votes		11,660	98.07	
Total rejected ballots		230	1.93	–0.36
Turnout		11,890	57.67	–5.30
Eligible voters		20,618		
Progressive Conservative hold		Swing		+15.17
Source: Elections Ontario

1955 Ontario general election
Party	Candidate	Votes	%	±%
Progressive Conservative	John Yaremko	5,330	38.43	+5.04
Liberal	Joseph Gould	5,097	36.75	+5.15
Co-operative Commonwealth	Bert Groves	1,875	13.52	–1.36
Labor–Progressive	Stewart Smith	1,567	11.30	–8.82
Total valid votes		13,869	97.70	
Total rejected ballots		326	2.30	–0.24
Turnout		14,195	62.97	–1.37
Eligible voters		22,544		
Progressive Conservative hold		Swing		–0.06
Source: Elections Ontario

1951 Ontario general election
Party	Candidate	Votes	%	±%
Progressive Conservative	John Yaremko	5,571	33.39	+2.38
Liberal	Joseph Gould	5,273	31.61	+20.63
Labor–Progressive	A. A. MacLeod	3,357	20.12	–17.05
Co-operative Commonwealth	Marvin Gordon	2,483	14.88	–5.96
Total valid votes		16,684	97.46	
Total rejected ballots		435	2.54	+0.87
Turnout		17,119	64.33	–5.21
Eligible voters		26,610		
Progressive Conservative gain from Labor–Progressive		Swing		+9.72
Source: Elections Ontario

1948 Ontario general election
Party	Candidate	Votes	%	±%
Labor–Progressive	A. A. MacLeod	7,764	37.17	+3.55
Progressive Conservative	George E. Renison	6,478	31.01	+1.43
Co-operative Commonwealth	J. Sydney Midanik	4,353	20.84	+0.36
Liberal	John M. Ryan	2,292	10.97	–5.35
Total valid votes		20,887	98.33	
Total rejected ballots		354	1.67	–0.38
Turnout		21,241	69.55	–0.21
Eligible voters		30,542		
Labor–Progressive hold		Swing		+1.06
Source: Elections Ontario

1945 Ontario general election
Party	Candidate	Votes	%	±%
Labor–Progressive	A. A. MacLeod	6,799	33.62	+3.25
Progressive Conservative	J. P. Williams	5,983	29.58	+2.92
Co-operative Commonwealth	Albert V. Russel	4,142	20.48	+1.60
Liberal	Arthur B. Farmer	3,301	16.32	–7.76
Total valid votes		20,225	97.96	
Total rejected ballots		422	2.04	+0.40
Turnout		20,647	69.76	+16.50
Eligible voters		29,597		
Labor–Progressive hold		Swing		+0.17
Source: Elections Ontario

1943 Ontario general election
Party	Candidate	Votes	%	±%
Labor–Progressive	A. A. MacLeod	4,312	30.37	–
Progressive Conservative	J. P. Williams	3,786	26.66	–2.87
Liberal	George B. Bagwell	3,420	24.09	–44.64
Co-operative Commonwealth	Lou Isaacs	2,681	18.88	–
Total valid votes		14,199	98.35	
Total rejected ballots		238	1.65	+0.12
Turnout		14,437	53.26	–12.08
Eligible voters		27,107		
Labor–Progressive gain from Liberal		Swing		–
Source: Elections Ontario

1937 Ontario general election
Party	Candidate	Votes	%	±%
Liberal	Arthur Roebuck	11,772	68.72	+13.56
Conservative	John Noble	5,060	29.54	–2.16
Socialist-Labour	Carl Neilson	298	1.74	–
Total valid votes		17,130	98.47	
Total rejected ballots		266	1.53	–0.81
Turnout		17,396	65.34	–5.36
Eligible voters		26,623		
Liberal hold		Swing		+7.86
Source: Elections Ontario

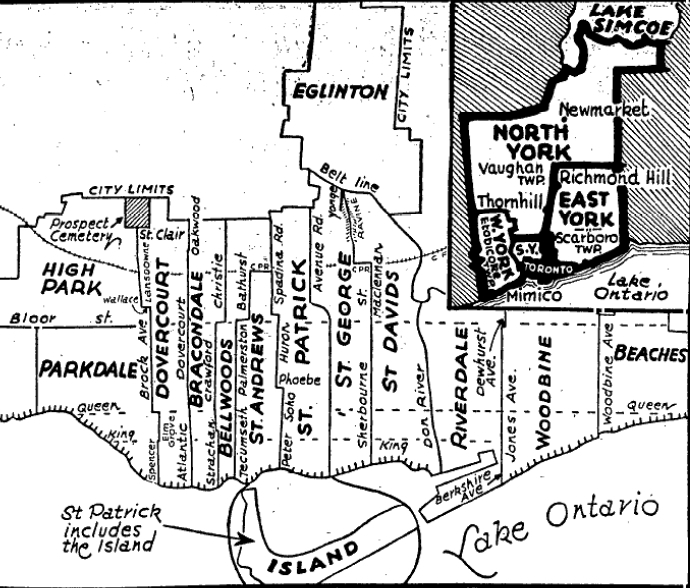
Toronto riding boundaries after 1934 redistribution

1934 Ontario general election
Party	Candidate	Votes	%	±%
Liberal	Arthur Roebuck	9,339	55.17	–
Conservative	Thomas Hamilton Bell	5,366	31.70	–42.70
Independent	Joshua Smith	1,133	6.69	–
Communist	Alice Buck	1,091	6.44	+0.70
Total valid votes		16,929	97.66	
Total rejected ballots		406	2.34	+1.01
Turnout		17,335	70.70	+35.69
Eligible voters		24,518		
Liberal gain from Conservative		Swing		–
Source: Elections Ontario

=== 1929 electoral boundaries ===
1929 Ontario general election
Party	Candidate	Votes	%	±%
Conservative	Thomas Hamilton Bell	5,114	74.40	–2.39
Labour	George Adam Watson	1,365	19.86	–
Communist	Tim Buck	395	5.75	–
Total valid votes		6,874	98.67	
Total rejected ballots		93	1.33	+0.16
Turnout		6,967	35.01	–27.08
Eligible voters		19,899		
Conservative hold		Swing		–
Source: Elections Ontario

1926 Ontario general election
Party	Candidate	Votes	%
Conservative	William Henry Edwards	9,452	76.79
Liberal-Prohibitionist	Arthur G. Frost	2,857	23.21
Total valid votes		12,309	98.83
Total rejected ballots		146	1.17
Turnout		12,455	62.09
Eligible voters		20,059	
Conservative pickup new district.			
Source: Elections Ontario

== See also ==
- List of Ontario provincial electoral districts
- Canadian provincial electoral districts
