= James Joseph Foy =

Canadian politician

J.J. Foy
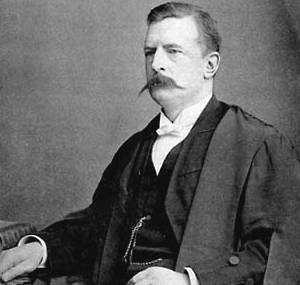

Ontario MPP
- In office 1914-1916
- Succeeded by: Hartley Dewart
- Constituency: Toronto Southwest - Seat A
- In office 1911-1914
- Constituency: Toronto North - Seat B
- In office 1908-1911
- Constituency: Toronto South - Seat A
- In office 1898-1908
- Preceded by: Oliver Howland
- Succeeded by: Edward Owens
- Constituency: Toronto South

Personal details
- Born: February 22, 1847 Toronto, Canada West
- Died: June 13, 1916 (aged 69) Toronto, Ontario
- Party: Conservative
- Spouse: Marie Cuvillier
- Education: St Michael's College, Toronto
- Occupation: Lawyer

James Joseph "J.J." Foy (February 22, 1847 – June 13, 1916) was an Ontario lawyer and political figure. He represented Toronto South in the Legislative Assembly of Ontario as a Conservative member from 1898 to 1916.

He was born in Toronto, the son of Patrick Foy, a Toronto merchant, and educated at St. Michael's College, Toronto and Ushaw College. He was called to the bar in 1871 and set up practice with a law firm in Toronto. In 1879, he married Marie Cuvillier. Foy was named Queen's Counsel in 1883.

In 1902 Foy served as a pall-bearer at the funeral for his longtime friend, Catholic railway magnate, John Ryan; alongside fellow Ontario politicians George Taylor Fulford, William Henry Comstock, and G.P. Graham.

He served as Attorney General from 1905 to 1914. Foy helped finance the Catholic Register, a Catholic weekly newspaper based in Toronto.

Foy died in office in 1916.
