= Angus McKay (Ontario politician) =

Canadian politician

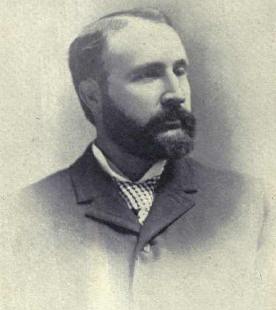

Ontario MPP
- In office 1886–1902
- Preceded by: George Atwell Cooke
- Succeeded by: Donald Sutherland
- Constituency: Oxford South

Personal details
- Born: October 2, 1852 Oxford Township, Canada West
- Died: May 7, 1916 (aged 63) East Nissouie, Oxford, Ontario
- Party: Liberal
- Spouse: Jean Leys Barker
- Children: Wilfrid, Eleanor(Pat), Ross and Elizabeth(Betty)
- Occupation: Doctor

Angus McKay (October 2, 1852 – May 7, 1916) was an Ontario physician and political figure. He represented Oxford South in the Legislative Assembly of Ontario from 1886 to 1902 as a Liberal member.

He was born in Oxford Township, Oxford County, Canada West in 1852, the son of Donald McKay, a Scottish immigrant. He studied medicine at Trinity College in Toronto and at the Royal College of Physicians of Edinburgh. He set up practice in Ingersoll. McKay was an examiner for the College of Physicians and Surgeons of Ontario. In 1883, he served as a member of the Oxford County council. He died in East Nissouie, Oxford, Ontario in 1916.
