= Merton Elvin Scott =

Canadian politician from Ontario

Member of the Ontario Provincial Parliament for Oxford South
- In office December 1, 1926 – September 17, 1929
- Preceded by: William Henry Chambers
- Succeeded by: Robert Andrew Baxter

Personal details
- Party: Liberal-Progressive

Merton Elvin Scott was a Canadian politician from Ontario. He represented Oxford South in the Legislative Assembly of Ontario from 1926 to 1929.

== See also ==
- 17th Parliament of Ontario
