= Toronto Southwest =

Former provincial electoral district in Ontario, Canada

Ontario electoral district
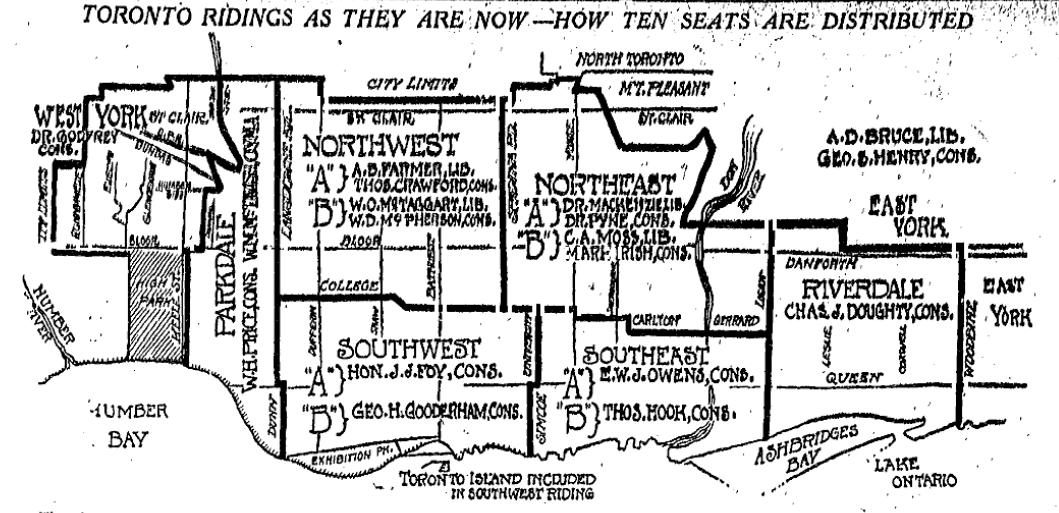
- Toronto Southwest in relation to other Toronto ridings in 1914

Defunct provincial electoral district
- Legislature: Legislative Assembly of Ontario
- District created: 1914
- District abolished: 1926
- First contested: 1914
- Last contested: 1923

Toronto Southwest was a provincial electoral district in Ontario, Canada, in the old City of Toronto's west-end. It was represented in the Legislative Assembly of Ontario from 1914 until 1926, when it was abolished and redistributed into the Brockton, Dovercourt, Bracondale, Bellwoods, St. Andrew, and St. Patrick districts. It had two seats in the Legislature: Seat A and Seat B. They were each elected in separate first-past-the-post election contests.

== Boundaries ==
Toronto Southwest's boundaries remained the same for the three elections that it was contested; and gaining a significant boost in eligible voters in 1919, when women and underage soldiers were given the right to vote for the first time. The northern boundary was College Street, starting at Lansdowne Avenue, across. It then went southwards along its eastern border on the western edge of University Avenue to Simcoe Street and then to Lake Ontario. It also included the Toronto Islands. The western border picked up on land on Dunn Avenue and then jogged west on the north side of Queen Street West to the east side of Lansdowne Avenue. It continued north on Lansdowne to the south side of College Street.

== Members of Provincial Parliament ==
Parliament	Years	Member	Party
prior to 1914 part of Toronto South and Toronto West ridings
Seat A
14th	1914–1916	J.J. Foy (Note: Foy died in office 13 June 1916)	Conservative
14th	1916–1919	Hartley Dewart	Liberal
15th	1919–1923	Hartley Dewart	Liberal
16th	1923–1926	James Arthur McCausland	Conservative
Seat B
14th	1914–1919	George Horace Gooderham	Conservative
15th	1919–1923	John Carman Ramsden	Liberal
16th	1923–1926	Frederick George McBrien	Conservative
		Sourced from the Ontario Legislative Assembly	
merged into Brockton, Dovercourt, Bracondale, Bellwoods, St. Andrew, St. Patrick after 1926

== Election results ==
Elections were run as separate races for Seat A and Seat B rather than a combined race.

=== Seat A ===
1914 Ontario general election
Party	Candidate	Votes	Vote %
Conservative	J.J. Foy	3,631	58.1
Liberal	Maybee (Note: Only last name of candidate given.)	2,228	35.7
Independent	Columbo	389	6.2
	Total	6,248	

By-election 21 August 1916
Party	Candidate	Votes	Vote %
Liberal	Hubert Hartley Dewart	2,705	50.6
Conservative	J.A. Norris	2,062	38.6
Socialist	J.M. Conner	445	8.3
Independent-Liberal	Gordon Waldron	131	2.5
	Total	5,343	

1919 Ontario general election (Note: This was the first election to allow women to vote, more than doubling the vote counts in each riding.)
Party	Candidate	Votes (Note: 13 polls unreported.)	Vote %
Liberal	Hubert Hartley Dewart	15,471	63.8
Conservative	George Horace Gooderham	8,760	36.2
	Total	24,231	

1923 Ontario general election
Party	Candidate	Votes (Note: 138 out of 146 polls reporting.)	Vote %
Conservative	James Arthur McCausland	7,967	58.0
Liberal	Hubert Hartley Dewart	3,211	23.4
Labour	Malcolm L. Bruce	2,562	18.6
	Total	13,740	

=== Seat B ===
1914 Ontario general election
Party	Candidate	Votes	Vote %
Conservative	George Horace Gooderham	5,695	71.2
Liberal	William Raney	2,301	28.8
	Total		

1919 Ontario general election
Party	Candidate	Votes	Vote %
Liberal	John Carman Ramsden	11,645	46.9
Conservative	William C. McBrien	7,228	29.1
Labour	John McDonald	5,960	24.0
	Total	24,833	

1923 Ontario general election
Party	Candidate	Votes	Vote %
Conservative	Frederick George McBrien	7,415	52.8
Independent-Liberal	Joseph Singer	2,306	16.4
Liberal	John MacDonald	2,209	15.7
Liberal	John Carman Ramsden	2,115	15.1
Total	14,045		

== See also ==
- List of Ontario provincial electoral districts
- Canadian provincial electoral districts
