= John Wallis (Canadian politician) =

Canadian politician

Ontario MPP
- Incumbent
- Assumed office 1867-1871
- Preceded by: First member
- Succeeded by: Adam Crooks
- Constituency: Toronto West

Personal details
- Born: 1815
- Died: 1872 (aged 56–57); Toronto, Ontario
- Political party: Conservative
- Profession: Brewer

John Wallis (c. 1815 – January 19, 1872) was a Conservative Member of Provincial Parliament in the Ontario legislature in the 1st Parliament of Ontario representing Toronto West from September 3, 1867, to February 25, 1871.

== Biography ==
Wallis worked in the brewing industry before entering politics.

He served on Toronto city council representing St. Patrick's ward. He defeated Adam Crooks in the 1867 general election but was defeated by Crooks in 1871 for the same seat in the Ontario legislative assembly.

He died at the age of 57 after a long illness.

== Electoral history ==
1867 Ontario general election: Toronto West
Party	Candidate	Votes	%
Conservative	John Wallis	1,439	57.26
Liberal	Adam Crooks	1,074	42.74
Total valid votes		2,513	52.94
Eligible voters		4,747	
Conservative pickup new district.			
Source: Elections Ontario

1871 Ontario general election: Toronto West
Party	Candidate	Votes	%	±%
Liberal	Adam Crooks	1,487	53.05	+10.31
Conservative	John Wallis	1,316	46.95	−10.31
Turnout		2,803	51.84	−1.10
Eligible voters		5,407		
Liberal gain from Conservative		Swing		+10.31
Source: Elections Ontario
