= Edward William James Owens =

Canadian politician

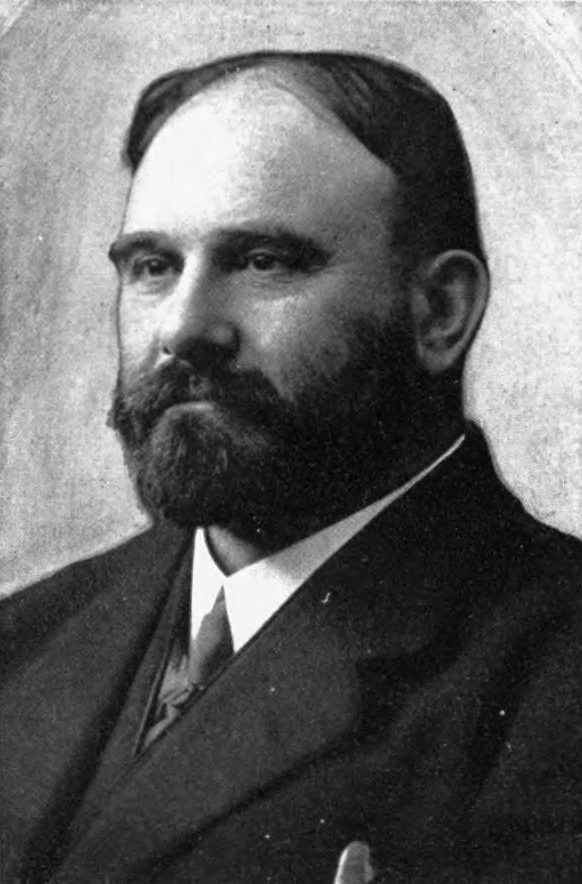

Ontario MPP
- In office 1923–1926
- Preceded by: James Walter Curry
- Succeeded by: Riding abolished
- Constituency: Toronto Southeast - Seat B
- In office 1914–1919
- Preceded by: New riding
- Succeeded by: John O'Neill
- Constituency: Toronto Southeast - Seat A
- In office 1911–1914
- Succeeded by: Riding abolished
- Constituency: Toronto South

Personal details
- Born: October 15, 1860 Dublin, Ireland
- Died: November 11, 1928 (aged 68) Toronto, Ontario
- Party: Conservative

Edward William James Owens (October 15, 1860 – November 11, 1928) was a Canadian lawyer and politician who served in the Legislative Assembly of Ontario from 1911 to 1919 and from 1923 to 1926.

Born in Dublin, Ireland, Owens was educated in Dublin and Manchester. He became a student at-law in the London office of Cronyn and Greenlees, of London. After passing the bar, he moved to Toronto, where he joined the firm of Leys, Reid and Owens. He later practised for a number of years by himself and later formed the firm of Owens, Proudfoot, and Cooke (later called Owens and Goodman). He was elected to the Legislative Assembly of Ontario in 1911. A Conservative, he was re-elected in 1914. He did not run in 1919 but was elected again in 1923. He died in 1928.
