= Adam Crooks (politician) =

Canadian politician

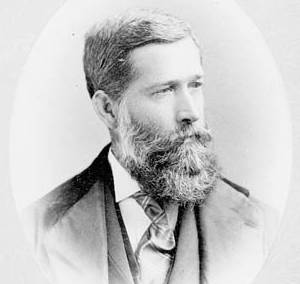
- Adam Crooks, 1872

Ontario MPP
- In office 1875–1883
- Preceded by: Adam Oliver
- Succeeded by: George Atwell Cooke
- Constituency: Oxford South
- In office 1871–1874
- Preceded by: John Wallis
- Succeeded by: Robert Bell
- Constituency: Toronto West

Personal details
- Born: December 11, 1827 West Flamboro, Ontario
- Died: December 28, 1885 (aged 58) Hartford, Connecticut
- Party: Liberal
- Occupation: Lawyer

Adam Crooks, QC (December 11, 1827 – December 28, 1885) was an Ontario Member of the Legislative Assembly of Ontario for Toronto West from 1871 to 1874 and moved to the riding of Oxford South from 1875 to 1886.

== Background ==
Crooks was born in West Flamboro, Ontario and the son of James Crooks & Jane Cummings. He attended Upper Canada College and later the University of Toronto, where he earned his BA in 1852. During his time in Toronto, he studied law and was called to the bar in 1851. Crooks married Emily Ann C. Evans in 1857. Their child, Lawrence Ogden Crooks, was born in 1858. During the early 1860s, Adam Crooks successfully appealed a lower court decision against the Commercial Bank of Canada before the Judicial Committee of the Privy Council in England. In 1863, he was named Queen's Counsel. Near the end of his life, he suffered from problems with his physical and mental health and was forced to retire from public life. He died in Hartford, Connecticut.

== Politics ==
He served as Attorney General from 1871 to 1872 and provincial treasurer from 1872 to 1877. Crooks played a major role in developing the 1876 liquor licence act, also known as the Crooks Act, which attempted to control the sale of alcohol within the province. He also served as the first Minister of Education in Ontario, appointed in 1876, after the retirement of Rev. Dr. Egerton Ryerson, who was Chief Superintendent.

In 1883, Crooks was declared insane and committed to an asylum in Maryland. He died in the United States in 1885.

== Electoral history ==
1871 Ontario general election: Toronto West
| Party | Candidate | Votes | % | ±% |
|---|---|---|---|---|
| Liberal | Adam Crooks | 1,487 | 53.05 | +10.31 |
| Conservative | John Wallis | 1,316 | 46.95 | −10.31 |
| Turnout | | 2,803 | 51.84 | −1.10 |
| Eligible voters | | 5,407 | | |
| Liberal gain from Conservative | | Swing | | +10.31 |
Source: Elections Ontario

Ontario provincial by-election, January 1872: Toronto West Ministerial by-election
| Party | Candidate | Votes | % | ±% |
|---|---|---|---|---|
| Liberal | Adam Crooks | 884 | 97.14 | +44.09 |
| Independent | Alderman S.B. Harman | 26 | 2.86 | |
| Total valid votes | | 910 | 100.0 | −67.53 |
| Liberal hold | | Swing | | +44.09 |
Source: History of the Electoral Districts, Legislatures and Ministries of the Province of Ontario

1875 Ontario general election: Toronto East
| Party | Candidate | Votes | % | ±% |
|---|---|---|---|---|
| Conservative | Matthew Crooks Cameron | 1,849 | 53.83 | +1.27 |
| Liberal | Adam Crooks | 1,579 | 45.97 | −1.47 |
| Independent | R.M. Allen | 7 | 0.20 | |
| Total valid votes | | 3,435 | 54.42 | +2.16 |
| Eligible voters | | 6,312 | | |
| Conservative hold | | Swing | | +1.37 |
Source: Elections Ontario

Ontario provincial by-election, September 1875: Oxford South Previous election voided
| Party | Candidate | Votes | % |
|---|---|---|---|
| Liberal | Adam Crooks | 1,612 | 54.39 |
| Conservative | B. Hopkins | 1,352 | 45.61 |
| Total valid votes | | 2,964 | |
| Liberal hold | | | |
Source: History of the Electoral Districts, Legislatures and Ministries of the Province of Ontario

1879 Ontario general election: Oxford South
| Party | Candidate | Votes | % | ±% |
|---|---|---|---|---|
| Liberal | Adam Crooks | 1,775 | 66.73 | +12.34 |
| Independent | Mr. Brown | 835 | 31.39 | |
| Independent | Mr. Markham | 50 | 1.88 | |
| Total valid votes | | 2,660 | 48.33 | |
| Eligible voters | | 5,504 | | |
| Liberal hold | | Swing | | +12.34 |
Source: Elections Ontario

| Preceded by Edmund Burke Wood | Treasurer of Ontario; 1872–1877 | Succeeded by Samuel Wood |
