= Ephraim Cook =

Ephraim Cook (June 14, 1803 – December 28, 1881) was a physician and political figure in Canada West.

He was born in Hadley, Massachusetts in 1803, the son of John Cook, a local farmer. He studied medicine at Boston and moved to St. Thomas, Upper Canada in 1830, where he continued his studies. Cook qualified to practice in 1831. He set up practice in Oxford County near the site of the village of Norwich. He also served as postmaster. In 1834, he married Phoebe English. He was elected to the Legislative Assembly of the Province of Canada for South Oxford in 1854 and served until 1857. Cook was also manager of a local bank and a director of the Port Dover and Lake Huron Railroad.

His son George was a lawyer and later served in the provincial assembly.
