= William Henry Edwards (politician) =

Canadian politician

Ontario MPP
- In office 1926–1929
- Preceded by: New riding
- Succeeded by: Thomas Hamilton Bell
- Constituency: Bellwoods
- In office 1923–1926
- Preceded by: Thomas Crawford
- Succeeded by: Riding abolished
- Constituency: Toronto Northwest - Seat A

Personal details
- Born: August 7, 1857 Dover, England
- Died: January 18, 1950 (aged 92) Toronto, Ontario, Canada
- Party: Conservative
- Spouse: Elizabeth Ann Kerslake

William Henry Edwards (August 7, 1857 – January 18, 1950) was an Ontario leather manufacturer and political figure. He represented Toronto Northwest and then Bellwoods in the Legislative Assembly of Ontario from 1924 to 1929 as a Conservative member.

== Background ==
Edwards was born in Dover, England, the son of John Edwards, came to Canada West with his family in 1862 and was educated in Toronto. He was a prominent businessman in the city as proprietor of J.E. Edwards & Sons Leather Good Manufacturers. He was also known as a mining pioneer working with Adam Wright in the early days of Cobalt, Ontario. In 1887, he married Elizabeth Ann Kerslake. Together they raised two children, a son and a daughter. He died in 1950.

== Politics ==
Edwards was a prominent member of the Conservative Party establishment in Toronto. He was the first president of the South York riding association and also served as president for West York.

He was elected in 1924 in a by-election in the riding of Toronto Northwest. He defeated his only opponent, J.A. Young of the Labor party by 5,957 votes. Pundits remarked that the voter turnout was unusually light with less than 10,000 votes cast. He was re-elected in the 1926 provincial election in the newly created riding of Bellwoods. He defeated Arthur Frost of the Labour-Prohibitionist Party by 6,595 votes. He declined to run in the 1929 election.
