= Henry Sloane Cooper =

Canadian politician

Ontario MPP
- In office 1919–1923
- Preceded by: William McPherson
- Succeeded by: Arthur Nesbitt
- Constituency: Toronto Northwest -Seat B

Personal details
- Born: 12 September 1888 Davisville, Ontario
- Died: 1970 (aged 81–82)
- Party: Liberal
- Occupation: Embroidery manufacturer
- Awards: Military Cross and bar

Military service
- Allegiance: Canada
- Years of service: 1914-1918
- Rank: Captain
- Unit: 3rd Battalion (Toronto Regiment), CEF
- Battles/wars: Western Front

Henry Sloane Cooper (September 12, 1888 – 1970) was an Ontario embroidery manufacturer and political figure. He represented Toronto Northwest in the Legislative Assembly of Ontario from October 20, 1919, to May 10, 1923, as a Liberal member.

== Biography ==
He was born in the village of Davisville, Ontario, the son of Hugh Cooper and Eliza Sloane, and educated in Toronto and at the Ontario Agricultural College in Guelph.

Cooper served as an officer, rising to captain, in the 3rd Battalion (Toronto Regiment), CEF during World War I. He enlisted at CFB Valcartier on 23 September 1914, and received a Military Cross and Bar during his service.
