= Robert Bell (Toronto politician) =

Canadian politician

Ontario MPP
- In office 1875–1883
- Preceded by: Adam Crooks
- Succeeded by: Henry Clarke
- Constituency: Toronto West

Personal details
- Born: June 8, 1832; Toronto, Ontario
- Died: February 11, 1907 (aged 74)
- Political party: Conservative
- Spouse: Matilda Clegg (1832–1893)
- Profession: Building contractor

Robert Bell (June 8, 1832 – February 11, 1907) was a politician in Ontario, Canada. He was a Conservative member of the Legislative Assembly of Ontario from 1875 to 1883 who represented the riding of Toronto West.

He was born in Toronto, the son of John Bell, a building contractor who came from Ireland in 1823. In 1853, Robert Bell married Matilda Clegg. He was chairman of the board of Waterworks Commissioners in Toronto from 1874 to 1877 and also served on the city council from 1860 to 1873. He was deputy Grand Master of the Royal Black chapter of Orangemen of British America in 1875.

== Electoral history ==
1875 Ontario general election: Toronto West
Party	Candidate	Votes	%	±%
Conservative	Robert Bell	2,145	50.71	
Liberal	W. Thomson	2,085	49.29	−47.85
Total valid votes		4,230	55.31	
Eligible voters		7,648		
Conservative gain from Liberal		Swing		+23.93
Source: Elections Ontario
