= John Yaremko =

Canadian politician

John Yaremko QC
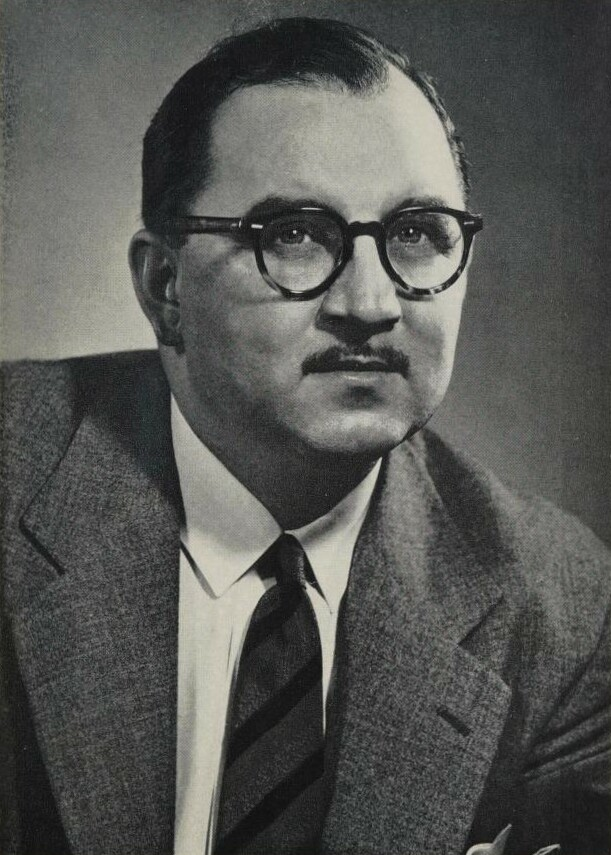

Ontario MPP
- In office 1951–1975
- Preceded by: A.A. MacLeod
- Succeeded by: Ross McClellan
- Constituency: Bellwoods

Personal details
- Born: August 10, 1918 Welland, Ontario, Canada
- Died: August 7, 2010 (aged 91) Toronto, Ontario, Canada
- Party: Progressive Conservative
- Spouse: Mary Materyn
- Occupation: Lawyer
- Portfolio: Minister without portfolio, (May–December, 1958)

John Yaremko, QC (August 10, 1918 – August 7, 2010) was a politician in Ontario, Canada. He was a Progressive Conservative member of the Legislative Assembly of Ontario from 1951 until 1975 who represented the downtown Toronto riding of Bellwoods. He was the first Ukrainian-Canadian to be elected to the Ontario legislature.

== Background ==
Yaremko was born in Welland, Ontario and educated in Hamilton, at the University of Toronto and at Osgoode Hall. He was called to the bar in 1946 and named a Queen's Counsel in 1953. He married Mary Materyn in 1945.

== Politics ==
In the 1951 provincial election, Yaremko was named the Progressive Conservative candidate in Bellwoods in its successful bid to unseat incumbent A. A. MacLeod, one of only two Communist Labor-Progressive Party MPPs in the Ontario legislature.

Yaremko served in the provincial cabinet as Minister Without Portfolio in 1958, Minister of Transport from 1958 to 1960, Provincial Secretary and Registrar from 1960 to 1966, Minister of Public Welfare from 1966 to 1967, Minister of Social and Family Services from 1967 to 1971, Provincial Secretary and Minister of Citizenship from 1971 to 1972 and Solicitor General from 1972 to 1974.

Very active in the Ukrainian Canadian community he was a benefactor of many of its causes and in 2009 was the recipient of the first Senator Paul Yuzyk Award for his commitment to multiculturalism.

=== Cabinet positions ===
Davis ministry, Province of Ontario (1971–1985)
Cabinet posts (2)
Predecessor	Office	Successor
New ministry	Solicitor General; 1971–1972	George Albert Kerr
Bob Welch	Provincial Secretary and Minister of Citizenship; 1971–1972	Ministry discontinued
Robarts ministry, Province of Ontario (1961–1971)
Cabinet posts (2)
Predecessor	Office	Successor
Louis-Pierre Cécile	Minister of Social and Family Services (Note: Styled as Minister of Public Welfare from 1966 to 1967 when portfolio was changed to Minister of Social and Family Services on March 22, 1967.); 1966-1971	Thomas Wells
New Ministry	Provincial Secretary and Minister of Citizenship; 1960-1966	Bob Welch
Frost ministry, Province of Ontario (1949–1961)
Cabinet posts (3)
Predecessor	Office	Successor
Mac Phillips	Provincial Secretary and Registrar; 1960-61	Ministry discontinued
Matthew Dymond	Minister of Transport; 1958-1960	Leslie Rowntree

== Later life ==
Yaremko served as chairman for the appeals tribunal for commercial liquor licenses for the province of Ontario from 1976 to 1985.

He died in Toronto on August 7, 2010.
