= Thomas Hamilton Bell =

Canadian politician

Ontario MPP
- In office 1929–1934
- Preceded by: William Edwards
- Succeeded by: Arthur Roebuck
- Constituency: Bellwoods

Personal details
- Born: November 12, 1878 Wellington County, Ontario, Canada
- Died: March 14, 1939 (aged 60) Toronto, Ontario, Canada
- Party: Conservative
- Spouse: Charlotte Wallace
- Profession: Businessman

Thomas Hamilton Bell (November 12, 1878 – March 14, 1939) was a politician in Ontario, Canada. He was a Conservative member of the Legislative Assembly of Ontario from 1929 to 1934 who represented the downtown Toronto riding of Bellwoods.

== Background ==
He was born in Wellington County, the son of James R. Bell and Barbara Finley. Bell was educated in Laurel, Toronto, Orangeville and London. In 1901, he married Charlotte Wallace. Bell was general manager and secretary-treasurer for an insurance company. He died of a hemorrhage in Toronto in 1939.

== Politics ==
Bell ran in the 1929 provincial election as the Conservative candidate in the Toronto riding of Bellwoods. He defeated Liberal candidate George Watson by 3,749 votes. He sat as a backbench supporter in the government of Howard Ferguson. In the 1934 election he was defeated by Liberal candidate Arthur Roebuck by 3,973 votes.
