= William David McPherson =

Canadian politician

Ontario MPP
- In office 1915 – 1919
- Preceded by: Riding established
- Succeeded by: Henry Cooper
- Constituency: Toronto Northwest - Seat B
- In office 1908 - 1914
- Preceded by: Thomas Crawford (Note: In 1908 the riding supported two members, denoted by Seat A and Seat B. Crawford was the sole representative before 1908.)
- Succeeded by: Riding abolished
- Constituency: Toronto West - Seat B

Personal details
- Born: August 22, 1863 Moore Township, Lambton County, Canada West
- Died: May 2, 1929 (aged 65) York, Ontario
- Party: Conservative
- Spouse: Nettie Jane Batten

William David McPherson (August 22, 1863 – May 2, 1929) was an Ontario barrister and political figure. He represented Toronto West and then Toronto Northwest in the Legislative Assembly of Ontario as a Conservative member from 1908 to 1919.

He was born in Moore Township, Lambton County, Canada West, the son of William McPherson, and educated in Strathroy. He married Nettie Jane Batten. McPherson was a Grand Master of the Orange Lodge for Canada.

McPherson was called to the Bar in 1885 and practised law in Toronto. He was in partnership with John Murray Clark from 1897 to 1904. Together they produced Canada's first text on mining law, The Laws of Mines in Canada. It was an impressive comparative law study that was reviewed in 12 Harvard Law Review (1898–9). After leaving the partnership he published The Law of Elections in Canada in 1905, evidencing his new interest in Canadian politics.

He was a member of the Toronto Public School Board and Toronto Library Board for 10 years before running unsuccessfully for Mayor of Toronto in 1904.

He served as Provincial Secretary and Registrar from 1916 to 1919.

He died in 1929.
