= Victor Albert Sinclair =

Canadian politician

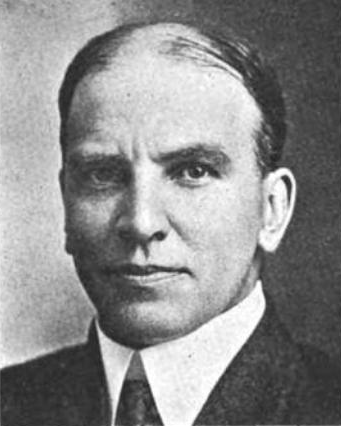

Ontario MPP
- In office 1914–1919
- Preceded by: Thomas Richard Mayberry
- Succeeded by: Albert Thomas Walker
- Constituency: Oxford South

Personal details
- Born: 18 May 1872 Tillsonburg, Ontario
- Died: 17 March 1944 (aged 71) Toronto, Ontario
- Party: Conservative
- Spouse: Gertrude L. Draper (m. 1901)
- Occupation: Lawyer

Victor Albert Sinclair (18 May 1872 –17 March 1944) was a lawyer and political figure in Ontario. He represented Oxford South in the Legislative Assembly of Ontario from 1914 to 1919 as a Conservative member.

He was born in Tillsonburg, the son of Dr. Lachlin C. Sinclair and Roxiliana Norman, and was educated in Tillsonburg, at the University of Toronto and Osgoode Hall. He was called to the bar in 1896 and entered practice in Tillsonburg. Sinclair served on the town council for Tillsonburg and served two years as mayor. He also served as high school trustee from 1910 to 1919. In 1901, he married Gertrude L. Draper. Sinclair served as president of the Tilsonburg Horticultural Club. He was also vice-president of the Tilsonburg Shoe Company. He later served as chairman of the Worker's Compensation Board of Ontario from 1925 to 1934 when he was removed from office by Mitchell Hepburn. He was an insurance lawyer in Toronto from 1935 until his death in March 1944.
