= Adam Oliver (politician) =

Canadian politician

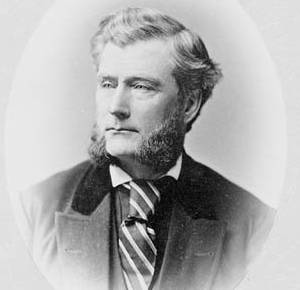

Ontario MPP
- In office 1867–1876
- Preceded by: Riding established
- Succeeded by: Adam Crooks
- Constituency: Oxford South

Personal details
- Born: December 11, 1823 Queens County, New Brunswick
- Died: October 9, 1882 (aged 58) Ingersoll, Ontario
- Party: Liberal
- Occupation: Businessman

Adam Oliver (December 11, 1823 – October 9, 1882) was an Ontario businessman and political figure. He represented Oxford South in the Legislative Assembly of Ontario as a Liberal member from 1867 to 1876.

He was born in Queens County, New Brunswick in 1823, grew up there and went to London in Upper Canada in 1836, where he became a carpenter. He moved to Ingersoll in 1850 and established a construction business there and later a lumber yard. He served on the village council and was reeve from 1859 to 1862. Although he was opposed to Ingersoll becoming a town, he served as its first mayor in 1865 and 1866. He was also a captain in the local militia and a magistrate. He was elected to represent Oxford South in the Ontario legislature in 1867 and 1871.

After fire destroyed his lumber yard in Orillia in 1871, he set up a sawmill and planing mill near Fort William in partnership with a Toronto lumberman and two lawyers from Ingersoll. After Fort William was selected as a major station on the Canadian Pacific Railway, this company profited from land sales to the government and contracts. The residents of nearby Port Arthur protested that this site had been chosen as a result of Oliver's political connections; a federal Liberal government was in power at the time. The Conservative-controlled Senate which conducted an investigation found that there was some substance to these allegations. He had already resigned in 1874 because his company had sold timber to a buyer for the provincial government; members of parliament were not allowed to conduct business with the government. He was reelected in a by-election held later in the same year. He was elected again in 1875 but was unseated after evidence of bribery was found. He died in Ingersoll in 1882.

== Electoral history ==
1867 Ontario general election: Oxford South
Party	Candidate	Votes	%
Liberal	Adam Oliver	1,399	54.52
Conservative	J. Noxon	1,167	45.48
Total valid votes		2,566	74.64
Eligible voters		3,438	
Liberal pickup new district.			
Source: Elections Ontario

1871 Ontario general election: Oxford South
Party	Candidate	Votes	%	±%
Liberal	Adam Oliver	1,430	57.78	+3.26
Conservative	Mr. Richards	1,045	42.22	−3.26
Turnout		2,475	65.86	−8.78
Eligible voters		3,758		
Liberal hold		Swing		+3.26
Source: Elections Ontario

Ontario provincial by-election, January 1874: Oxford South Resignation of Adam Oliver
Party	Candidate	Votes
Liberal	Adam Oliver	Acclaimed
Source: History of the Electoral Districts, Legislatures and Ministries of the Province of Ontario; Oliver resigned as his lumber business, had inadvertently sold timber to a buyer for the provincial government, in contravention of independence of parliament.

1875 Ontario general election: Oxford South
Party	Candidate	Votes	%
Liberal	Adam Oliver	1,305	44.27
Conservative	B. Hopkins	1,262	42.81
Independent	J. McDonald	372	12.62
Independent	Mr. Devlin	9	0.31
Total valid votes		2,948	66.05
Eligible voters		4,463	
Election voided
Source: Elections Ontario
