= Toronto West (provincial electoral district) =

Ontario electoral district
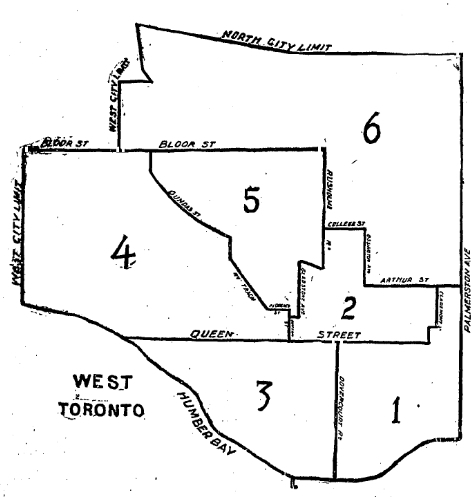
- Toronto West, 1894 incarnation

Defunct provincial electoral district
- Legislature: Legislative Assembly of Ontario
- District created: 1867
- District abolished: 1914
- First contested: 1867
- Last contested: 1911

Toronto West, originally created as West Toronto, was one of the two provincial electoral districts in Toronto, Ontario represented in the first to fifth Ontario parliaments between 1867 and 1886, and one of Toronto's four electoral districts represented in the eighth to thirteenth Ontario parliaments between 1894 and 1914.

== Boundaries evolution ==
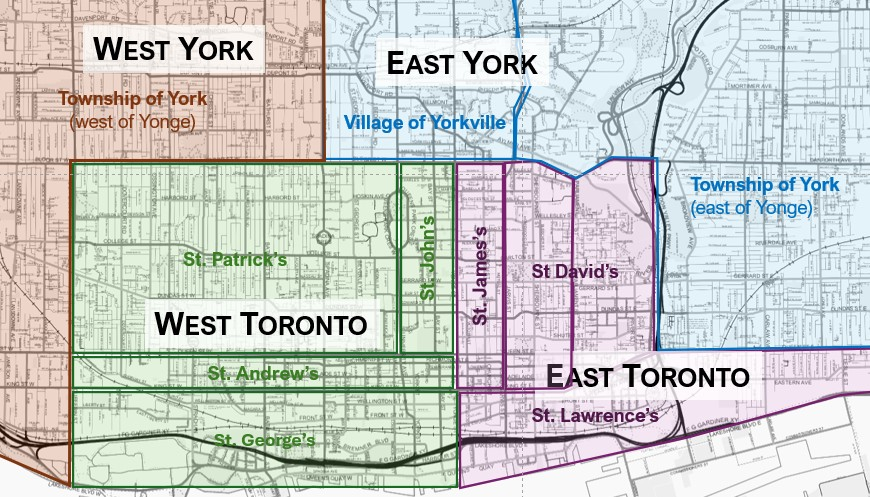
1860–1886

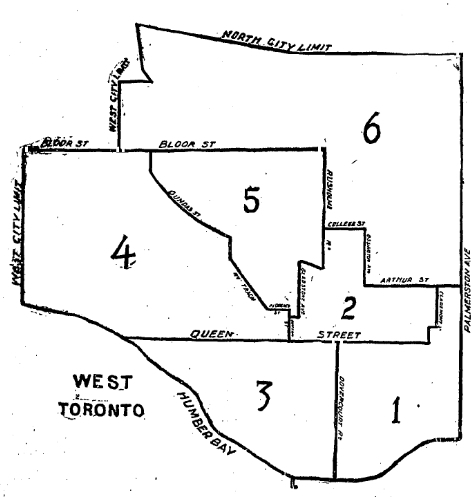
1894–1914

The two original Toronto electoral districts, West Toronto and East Toronto were initially created in 1860, dividing the city east-west along Yonge Street. They were contested in the final two elections of the United Province of Canada in 1861 and 1863. Toronto West consisted of the city wards of St. John, St. Andrew, St. Patrick and St. George. The city extended only as far west as Dufferin Street and as far north as Bloor Street at the time.

Upon Canadian confederation in 1867, the British North America Act preserved approximately forty electoral districts in Ontario while another forty were redrawn or created. The two Toronto districts were among those preserved, and were each given a federal seat and a provincial seat with identical boundaries as before. They were contested in the first federal election in 1867 that was held concurrently with the first Ontario provincial election.

While Toronto elected a third MPs by the second federal election held in 1872, its provincial representation did not increase until the sixth Ontario election in 1886. Toronto was a Conservative bastion in the first century following confederation. Instead of creating a new seat for the opposition, in 1886 the governing Liberals merged the two Toronto electoral district into a single electoral district covering the entire city, including the recently annexed village of Yorkville. The enlarged electoral district of Toronto returned three members to the sixth and seventh Ontario legislative assembly with a limited voting system, where voters may vote for two of the candidates.

In 1894, the city was distributed to four electoral districts. By that time Toronto had further annexed a number of communities, including Parkdale and Brockton in the west side of the city. Accordingly, the 1894 incarnation of Toronto West covered territory that were further west from the city core, with boundaries defined as Lake Ontario to the south between Palmerston Avenue in the east and the city limits in the west. The northern boundary was the city limits, which was formed by the Grand Trunk Railway right-of-way.

The city was rewarded when the conservatives finally ended the over three decades of Liberal rule in 1905. The city's representation at Queen's Park doubled from four to eight in the 1908 election. Instead of creating new districts, for the five elections between 1908 and 1923, Toronto voters cast two votes in two concurrent contests.

In 1914 the districts of Toronto East, Toronto North, Toronto South and Toronto West were replaced by Toronto Northeast, Toronto Northwest, Toronto Southwest and Toronto Southeast, and they continued to be duo-member districts. Toronto West was distributed to Toronto Southwest, Toronto Northwest, with the former town of Parkdale being established as its own new electoral district.

== Members of Provincial Parliament ==
West Toronto was represented in the final two parliaments of the Legislative Assembly of the Province of Canada. Upon confederation, the electoral division was represented by a member of the dominion (federal) parliament in addition to the following members of provincial parliament.

Assembly	Years	Member	Party
Legislative Assembly of the Province of Canada; Created from the electoral division of Toronto; West Toronto
7th	1861–1863	John Beverley Robinson	Conservative
8th	1863–1867	John Macdonald	Reformer
Legislative Assembly of Ontario; Continued as an existing electoral division from Province of Canada; West Toronto
1st	1867–1871	John Wallis	Conservative
2nd	1871–1875	Adam Crooks (Note: On 9 January 1872, Crooks resigned in order to recontest the seat due to his appointment as Attorney General. This was known as a ministerial by-election.)	Liberal
3rd	1875–1879	Robert Bell	Conservative
4th	1879–1883	Robert Bell	Conservative
5th	1883–1886	Henry Clarke	Conservative
Merged with Toronto East to form Toronto
Re-constituted upon Toronto being divided to four electoral districts Toronto West
8th	1894–1898	Thomas Crawford	Conservative
9th	1898–1902	Thomas Crawford	Conservative
10th	1902–1904	Thomas Crawford	Conservative
11th	1904–1908	Thomas Crawford	Conservative
12th	1908–1911	Seat A: Thomas Crawford; Seat B: William McPherson	Conservative
13th	1911–1914	Seat A: Thomas Crawford; Seat B: William McPherson	Conservative
Dissolved and distributed to Toronto Southwest, Toronto Northwest and Parkdale

Sourced from the Ontario Legislative Assembly

== Election results ==
=== 1867–1886 ===
1867 Ontario general election
Party	Candidate	Votes	%
Conservative	John Wallis	1,439	57.26
Liberal	Adam Crooks	1,074	42.74
Total valid votes		2,513	52.94
Eligible voters		4,747	
Conservative pickup new district.			
Source: Elections Ontario

1871 Ontario general election
Party	Candidate	Votes	%	±%
Liberal	Adam Crooks	1,487	53.05	+10.31
Conservative	John Wallis	1,316	46.95	−10.31
Turnout		2,803	51.84	−1.10
Eligible voters		5,407		
Liberal gain from Conservative		Swing		+10.31
Source: Elections Ontario

Ontario provincial by-election, January 1872 Ministerial by-election
Party	Candidate	Votes	%	±%
Liberal	Adam Crooks	884	97.14	+44.09
Independent	Alderman S.B. Harman	26	2.86	
Total valid votes		910	100.0	−67.53
Liberal hold		Swing		+44.09
Source: History of the Electoral Districts, Legislatures and Ministries of the Province of Ontario

1875 Ontario general election
Party	Candidate	Votes	%	±%
Conservative	Robert Bell	2,145	50.71	
Liberal	W. Thomson	2,085	49.29	−47.85
Total valid votes		4,230	55.31	
Eligible voters		7,648		
Conservative gain from Liberal		Swing		+23.93
Source: Elections Ontario

1879 Ontario general election
Party	Candidate	Votes	%	±%
Conservative	Robert Bell	2,324	50.74	+0.03
Liberal	A. Ogden	2,256	49.26	−0.03
Total valid votes		4,580	45.24	−10.07
Eligible voters		10,123		
Conservative hold		Swing		+0.03
Source: Elections Ontario

=== 1894–1914 ===
1894 Ontario general election
Party	Candidate	Votes	Vote %
Conservative	Thomas Crawford	4,860	63.1
Liberal	Mr. Lindsey	2,846	36.9
	Total	7,706	

1898 Ontario general election
Party	Candidate	Votes	Vote %
Conservative	Thomas Crawford	3,777	55.9
Liberal	Mr. Spence	2,982	44.1
	Total	6,759	

1902 Ontario general election
Party	Candidate	Votes	Vote %
Conservative	Thomas Crawford	4,260	58.0
Liberal	Mr. Urquhart	2,732	37.2
Socialist	J. Kelly	270	3.7
Socialist-Labour	Mr. Wellwood	79	1.1
	Total	7,341	

1905 Ontario general election
Party	Candidate	Votes	Vote %
Conservative	Thomas Crawford	5,022	70.3
Temperance	Dr. Hunter	1,792	25.1
Socialist	Mr. Peel	208	2.9
Independent	Mr. Galbraith	91	1.3
Independent	Mr. Noble	32	0.4
	Total	7,145	

==== Seat A ====
1908 Ontario general election
Party	Candidate	Votes	Vote %
Conservative	Thomas Crawford	6,251	70.9
Liberal	Mr. Miles	1,908	21.6
Socialist	Mr. Thompson	295	3.3
Independent Liberal	Mr. Hunter	281	3.2
Labour	Mr. Noble	49	0.6
Independent	Mr. Briggs	32	0.4
	Total	8,816	

1911 Ontario general election
Party	Candidate	Votes	Vote %
Conservative	Thomas Crawford	5,111	76.5
Liberal	Mr. Hunter	1,362	20.4
Labour	Mr. Noble	212	3.2
	Total	6,685	

==== Seat B ====
1908 Ontario general election
Party	Candidate	Votes	Vote %
Conservative	William McPherson	4,180	46.3
Liberal	Mr. Hay	2,269	25.2
Independent Conservative	Mr. Wright	1,991	22.1
Labour	Mr. Gardner	432	4.8
Socialist	Mr. Frost	149	1.7
	Total	9,021	

1911 Ontario general election
Party	Candidate	Votes	Vote %
Conservative	William McPherson	4,837	75.0
Liberal	James Watt	1,613	25.0
	Total	6,450	
