= William Henry Chambers =

Canadian politician from Ontario

Member of the Ontario Provincial Parliament for Oxford South
- In office June 25, 1923 – October 18, 1926
- Preceded by: Albert Thomas Walker
- Succeeded by: Merton Elvin Scott

Personal details
- Party: Conservative

William Henry Chambers was a Canadian politician from the Conservative Party of Ontario. He represented Oxford South in the Legislative Assembly of Ontario from 1923 to 1926.

== See also ==
- 16th Parliament of Ontario
