= Ross McClellan =

Canadian politician

Ross A. McClellan

Ontario MPP
- In office 1975–1987
- Preceded by: John Yaremko
- Succeeded by: Riding abolished
- Constituency: Bellwoods

Personal details
- Born: October 8, 1942 (age 83) Toronto, Ontario
- Party: New Democrat
- Occupation: Social worker

Ross A. McClellan (born October 8, 1942) is a former politician in Ontario, Canada. He served in the Legislative Assembly of Ontario from 1975 to 1987 as a member of the New Democratic Party.

== Background ==
McClellan was educated at St. Michael's College and the school of Social Work at the University of Toronto. A social worker, he served as vice-president of the Social Planning Council of Metropolitan Toronto in 1975–76.

== Politics ==
He was elected to the Ontario legislature in the 1975 provincial election, defeating Liberal Millie Caccia by 494 votes in the Toronto constituency of Bellwoods. Along with Tony Lupusella and Odoardo Di Santo, McClellan helped to increase the NDP's popularity in the Italian areas of the city. McClellan's mother is Italian.

He was easily re-elected in the 1977 election, and fended off more serious challenges from Liberal Walter Bardyn in 1981 and 1985. He supported Richard Johnston for the party leadership in 1982.

The Progressive Conservative Party, which had governed Ontario since 1943, was reduced to a precarious minority government in the 1985 election. McClellan did not want the NDP to form a coalition government with the Liberals, on the grounds that the Party would be totally opposed. McClellan was instead appointed chief negotiator for talks with both the Liberals and Progressive Conservatives, in which the NDP agreed to provide support to another party without actually joining government. These talks led to a two-year accord with the Liberal Party, which promised to introduce progressive reforms in return for NDP support in the legislature. After a motion of no confidence in which the Liberals and NDP defeated the Conservative's budget bill, Liberal leader David Peterson was sworn in as Premier of Ontario on June 26, 1985.

McClellan's career in the legislature was cut short by electoral redistribution prior to the 1987 election. The Bellwoods constituency was eliminated, and McClellan was forced to contest the NDP nomination in Dovercourt against Tony Lupusella. Although McClellan won the nomination, Lupusella subsequently left the NDP to contest the constituency as a Liberal, and defeated McClellan by 907 votes. McClellan did not seek a return to the legislature after this loss.

== Later life ==
The NDP won a majority government under Bob Rae's leadership in 1990. McClellan served as a senior policy adviser to the Premier from 1990 to 1995. McClellan was privileged to attend and participate in all meetings of the Rae Cabinet, and was co-secretary of the Cabinet Planning and Priorities Committee. He influenced many key policy decisions, including the decision to raise welfare rates by 22% and to protect the rates from cuts, to maintain and expand Ontario's stand-alone social housing program, as well as the government's decision not to introduce public auto insurance in 1991.

McClellan has been a member of the Ontario and Federal NDP executive at various times since the Rae years and is largely credited with authoring the NDP election platforms in the Federal general elections of 1997 and 2000. He became a senior staffer for the Ontario Federation of Labour in the 1990s, and remained there until his retirement. McClellan consistently spoke out against limiting union donations to political parties. He continued to participate in NDP caucus meetings as the OFL liaison to caucus.

In 2002, on his last day at the OFL, he played a leading role in resolving a strike involving Toronto municipal workers. In September 2002, McClellan was appointed as Vice Chair at the Workplace Safety and Insurance Tribunal.

He retired from the Tribunal in 2013. He and his wife Patricia live in a little cottage on the banks of the Credit River in Caledon. At age sixty-four he decided to learn to play the fiddle and is a long-time member of the Oakville Celtic Fiddle Orchestra.
