= Robert Andrew Baxter =

Canadian politician

Ontario MPP
- In office 1929–1934
- Preceded by: Merton Elvin Scott
- Succeeded by: Riding abolished
- Constituency: Oxford South

Personal details
- Born: October 16, 1879 Brownsville, Ontario
- Died: July 1, 1947 (aged 67)
- Party: Liberal
- Spouse: Frances H. Overbaugh (m. 1916)
- Occupation: Farmer

Robert Andrew Baxter (October 16, 1879 – 1947) was a farmer and political figure in Ontario. He represented Oxford South in the Legislative Assembly of Ontario from 1929 to 1934 as a Liberal.

He was born in Brownsville, the son of John Baxter and Sarah Bigham, and was educated in Brownsville and Tillsonburg. In 1916, he married Frances H Overbaugh (née Louch). Baxter served as reeve for Durham township and as warden for Oxford County. He died in 1947.
