= Oxford South (provincial electoral district) =

Former provincial electoral district in Ontario, Canada

Ontario electoral district

Defunct provincial electoral district
- Legislature: Legislative Assembly of Ontario
- District created: 1867
- District abolished: 1933
- First contested: 1867
- Last contested: 1929

Oxford South was a provincial electoral district in Ontario, Canada. It was created in 1867 at the time of confederation and was abolished in 1933 before the 1934 election.

== Members of Provincial Parliament ==
Oxford South
Assembly	Years	Member	Party
1st	1867–1871	Adam Oliver	Liberal
2nd	1871–1874	Adam Oliver	Liberal
3rd	1875–1875	Adam Oliver	Liberal
3rd	1875–1879	Adam Crooks	Liberal
4th	1879–1883	Adam Crooks	Liberal
5th	1883–1884	Adam Crooks	Liberal
5th	1884–1886	George Atwell Cooke	Liberal
6th	1886–1890	Angus McKay	Liberal
7th	1890–1894	Angus McKay	Liberal
8th	1894–1896	Angus McKay	Liberal
9th	1898–1902	Angus McKay	Liberal
10th	1902–1904	Donald Sutherland	Conservative
11th	1905–1908	Donald Sutherland	Conservative
12th	1908–1911	Thomas Richard Mayberry	Liberal
13th	1911–1914	Thomas Richard Mayberry	Liberal
14th	1914–1919	Victor Albert Sinclair	Conservative
15th	1919–1923	Albert Thomas Walker	United Farmers
16th	1923–1926	William Henry Chambers	Conservative
17th	1926–1929	Merton Elvin Scott	Liberal–Progressive
18th	1929–1934	Robert Andrew Baxter	Liberal
Sourced from the Ontario Legislative Assembly
Merged into Oxford before 1934 election

== Election results ==
1929 Ontario general election
Party	Candidate	Votes	%	±%
Liberal	Robert Andrew Baxter	5,217	52.49	–
Conservative	James Pullin	4,722	47.51	+4.48
Total valid votes		9,939	99.39	
Total rejected ballots		61	0.61	+0.01
Turnout		10,000	72.00	–1.59
Eligible voters		13,888		
Liberal gain from Liberal–Progressive		Swing		–2.24
Source: Elections Ontario

1926 Ontario general election
Party	Candidate	Votes	%	±%
Liberal–Progressive	Merton Elvin Scott	5,793	56.97	–
Conservative	William Henry Chambers	4,375	43.03	+3.83
Total valid votes		10,168	99.40	
Total rejected ballots		61	0.60	–0.06
Turnout		10,229	73.59	+3.85
Eligible voters		13,900		
Liberal–Progressive gain from Conservative		Swing		–
Source: Elections Ontario

1923 Ontario general election
Party	Candidate	Votes	%	±%
Conservative	William Henry Chambers	3,889	39.20	+4.88
United Farmers	John L. Wright	3,134	31.59	–8.25
Liberal	J. Verne Buchanan	2,898	29.21	+3.37
Total valid votes		9,921	99.34	
Total rejected ballots		66	0.66	–1.86
Turnout		9,987	69.74	–11.63
Eligible voters		14,320		
Conservative gain from United Farmers		Swing		+6.57
Source: Elections Ontario

1919 Ontario general election
Party	Candidate	Votes	%	±%
United Farmers	Albert Thomas Walker	4,452	39.84	–
Conservative	Victor Albert Sinclair	3,835	34.32	–15.69
Liberal	Alexander Rose	2,888	25.84	–24.15
Total valid votes		11,175	97.48	
Total rejected ballots		289	2.52	+1.85
Turnout		11,464	81.37	–4.01
Eligible voters		14,089		
United Farmers gain from Conservative		Swing		+12.07
Source: Elections Ontario

1914 Ontario general election
Party	Candidate	Votes	%	±%
Conservative	Victor Albert Sinclair	2,582	50.01	+2.16
Liberal	Thomas Richard Mayberry	2,581	49.99	–2.16
Total valid votes		5,163	99.33	
Total rejected ballots		35	0.67	+0.12
Turnout		5,198	85.38	+12.14
Eligible voters		6,088		
Conservative gain from Liberal		Swing		+2.16
Source: Elections Ontario

1911 Ontario general election
Party	Candidate	Votes	%	±%
Liberal	Thomas Richard Mayberry	2,457	52.15	+1.74
Conservative	William McGhee	2,254	47.85	–1.74
Total valid votes		4,711	99.45	
Total rejected ballots		26	0.55	–0.33
Turnout		4,737	73.24	–15.31
Eligible voters		6,468		
Liberal hold		Swing		+1.74
Source: Elections Ontario

1908 Ontario general election
Party	Candidate	Votes	%	±%
Liberal	Thomas Richard Mayberry	2,671	50.42	+2.46
Conservative	Donald Sutherland	2,627	49.58	–2.46
Total valid votes		5,298	99.12	
Total rejected ballots		47	0.88	+0.38
Turnout		5,345	88.55	+5.83
Eligible voters		6,036		
Liberal gain from Conservative		Swing		+2.46
Source: Elections Ontario

1905 Ontario general election
Party	Candidate	Votes	%	±%
Conservative	Donald Sutherland	2,713	52.04	–0.17
Liberal	W. A. Dowler	2,500	47.96	+0.17
Total valid votes		5,213	99.50	
Total rejected ballots		26	0.50	+0.39
Turnout		5,239	82.73	+23.96
Eligible voters		6,333		
Conservative hold		Swing		–0.17
Source: Elections Ontario

1902 Ontario general election
Party	Candidate	Votes	%	±%
Conservative	Donald Sutherland	2,043	52.21	+10.61
Liberal	Angus McKay	1,870	47.79	–10.61
Total valid votes		3,913	99.90	
Total rejected ballots		4	0.10	–0.12
Turnout		3,917	58.76	–3.77
Eligible voters		6,666		
Conservative gain from Liberal		Swing		+10.61
Source: Elections Ontario

1898 Ontario general election
Party	Candidate	Votes	%	±%
Liberal	Angus McKay	2,343	58.40	+4.19
Conservative	E. W. Chambers	1,669	41.60	–
Total valid votes		4,012	99.78	
Total rejected ballots		9	0.22	–0.33
Turnout		4,021	62.54	–8.62
Eligible voters		6,430		
Liberal hold		Swing		+2.10
Source: Elections Ontario

1894 Ontario general election
Party	Candidate	Votes	%	±%
Liberal	Angus McKay	2,454	54.21	–10.48
Liberal-Patrons of Industry	W. Nancekivell	2,073	45.79	–
Total valid votes		4,527	99.45	
Total rejected ballots		25	0.55	+0.22
Turnout		4,552	71.16	+26.94
Eligible voters		6,397		
Liberal hold		Swing		–5.24
Source: Elections Ontario

1890 Ontario general election
Party	Candidate	Votes	%	±%
Liberal	Angus McKay	1,764	64.69	+4.48
Equal Rights	R. Butler	963	35.31	–
Total valid votes		2,727	99.67	
Total rejected ballots		9	0.33	–0.21
Turnout		2,736	44.21	–21.64
Eligible voters		6,188		
Liberal hold		Swing		+2.24
Source: Elections Ontario

1886 Ontario general election
Party	Candidate	Votes	%	±%
Liberal	Angus McKay	2,216	54.23	+2.91
Conservative	Dr. Williams	1,626	39.79	–
Liberal	George Atwell Cooke	244	5.97	–45.35
Total valid votes		4,086	99.46	
Total rejected ballots		22	0.54	+0.54
Turnout		4,108	65.85	–
Eligible voters		6,238		
Liberal hold		Swing		+1.46
Source: Elections Ontario

Ontario provincial by-election, March 5, 1884 Adam Crooks declared "incurably insane" and seat vacated
Party	Candidate	Votes	%	±%
Liberal	George Atwell Cooke	1,963	51.32	–2.45
Unknown	W. Noxon	1,862	48.68	–
Total valid votes		3,825	100.00	
Total rejected ballots		–		
Turnout		3,825	–	–
Eligible voters				
Liberal hold		Swing		–1.23
Source: Elections Ontario

1883 Ontario general election
Party	Candidate	Votes	%	±%
Liberal	Adam Crooks	1,640	53.77	–12.96
Conservative	Dr. Williams	1,410	46.23	–
Total valid votes		3,050	99.41	
Total rejected ballots		18	0.59	+0.59
Turnout		3,068	52.71	+4.38
Eligible voters		5,821		
Liberal hold		Swing		–6.48
Source: Elections Ontario

1879 Ontario general election
Party	Candidate	Votes	%	±%
Liberal	Adam Crooks	1,775	66.73	+12.34
Independent	Mr. Brown	835	31.39	
Independent	Mr. Markham	50	1.88	
Total valid votes		2,660	48.33	
Eligible voters		5,504		
Liberal hold		Swing		+12.34
Source: Elections Ontario

Ontario provincial by-election, September 1875 Previous election voided
Party	Candidate	Votes	%
Liberal	Adam Crooks	1,612	54.39
Conservative	B. Hopkins	1,352	45.61
Total valid votes		2,964	
Liberal hold			
Source: History of the Electoral Districts, Legislatures and Ministries of the Province of Ontario

1875 Ontario general election
Party	Candidate	Votes	%
Liberal	Adam Oliver	1,305	44.27
Conservative	B. Hopkins	1,262	42.81
Independent	J. McDonald	372	12.62
Independent	Mr. Devlin	9	0.31
Total valid votes		2,948	66.05
Eligible voters		4,463	
Election voided
Source: Elections Ontario

Ontario provincial by-election, January 1874 Resignation of Adam Oliver
Party	Candidate	Votes
Liberal	Adam Oliver	Acclaimed
Source: History of the Electoral Districts, Legislatures and Ministries of the Province of Ontario; Oliver resigned as his lumber business, had inadvertently sold timber to a buyer for the provincial government, in contravention of independence of parliament.

1871 Ontario general election
Party	Candidate	Votes	%	±%
Liberal	Adam Oliver	1,430	57.78	+3.26
Conservative	Mr. Richards	1,045	42.22	−3.26
Turnout		2,475	65.86	−8.78
Eligible voters		3,758		
Liberal hold		Swing		+3.26
Source: Elections Ontario

1867 Ontario general election
Party	Candidate	Votes	%
Liberal	Adam Oliver	1,399	54.52
Conservative	J. Noxon	1,167	45.48
Total valid votes		2,566	74.64
Eligible voters		3,438	
Liberal pickup new district.			
Source: Elections Ontario

== See also ==
- List of Ontario provincial electoral districts
- Canadian provincial electoral districts
