= Thomas Richard Mayberry =

Canadian politician

Thomas Richard Mayberry (March 16, 1854 – 1934) was an Ontario politician. He represented Oxford South in the Legislative Assembly of Ontario from 1908 to 1914 as a Liberal.

== Biography ==
The son of Richard Mayberry and Matilda Sibbald, he was born in Salford, Dereham township. Mayberry was secretary and manager for the Dereham and West Oxford Mutual Fire Insurance Company. He served as clerk-treasurer for West Oxford township, later serving as a member of township council and as township reeve. In 1888, he was elected warden for Oxford County. He also was chair of the Ingersoll Board of Education.

In 1875, Mayberry married Laura Anelia Carpenter.

During World War I, he was lieutenant-colonel commanding the 24th Grey's Horse Regiment.

In 1908, Mayberry defeated Donald Sutherland to win a seat in the Ontario assembly. He was re-elected in 1911 but defeated in 1914.
