= Thomas Hook =

Canadian politician

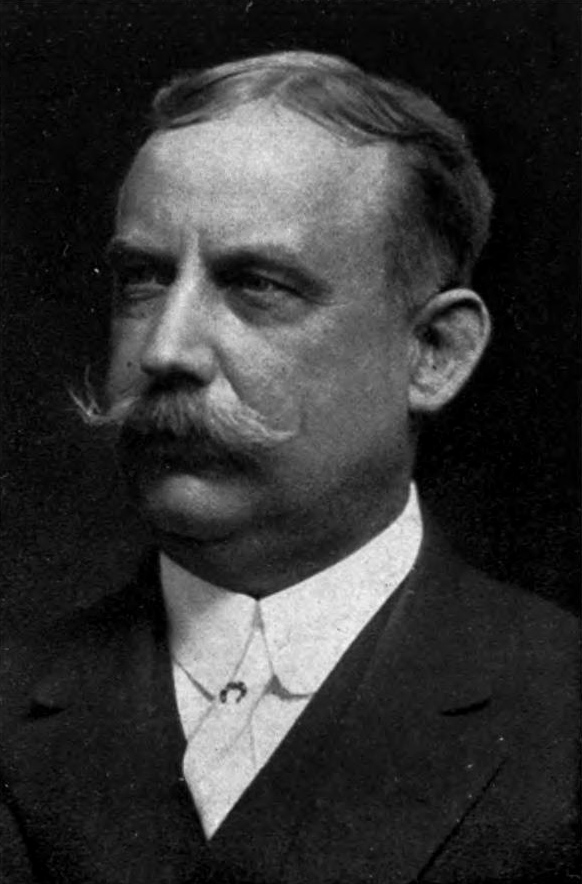
Hook in an undated photograph

Thomas Hook (November 11, 1860 – January 2, 1927) was an Ontario real estate agent and political figure. He represented Toronto Southeast in the Legislative Assembly of Ontario from 1914 to 1919 as a Conservative member.

He was born in Bristol, England and came to Canada with his family around 1867. They settled in London, where his father established himself as a building contractor. Hook worked for the Dominion Savings and Investment Company and then moved to Toronto, where he entered the real estate business.

He died January 2, 1927, in Toronto after a long illness.
