= Toronto Southeast =

Former provincial electoral district in Ontario, Canada

Ontario electoral district
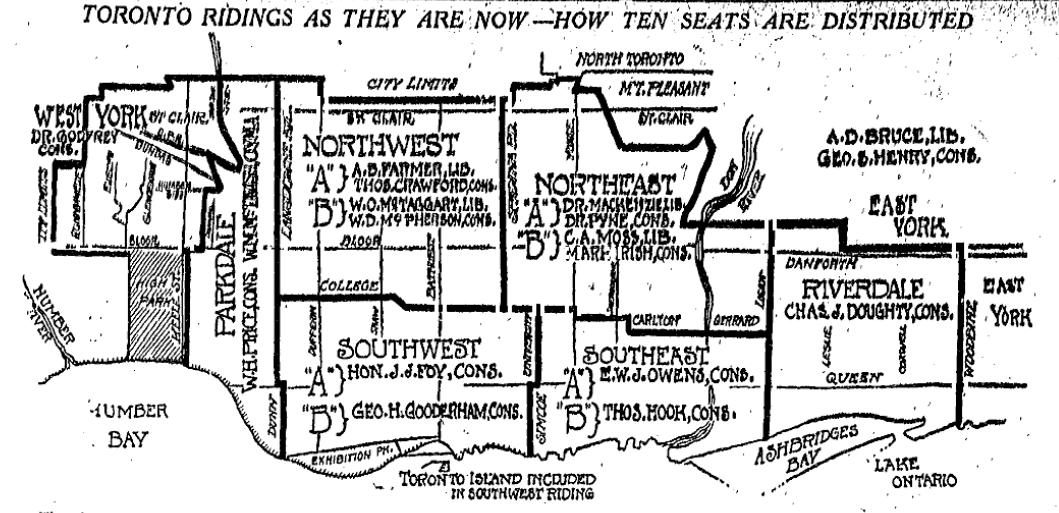
- Toronto Southeast in relation to other Toronto ridings in 1914

Defunct provincial electoral district
- Legislature: Legislative Assembly of Ontario
- District created: 1914
- District abolished: 1926
- First contested: 1914
- Last contested: 1923

Toronto Southeast was a provincial electoral district in Ontario, Canada, that existed from 1914 to 1926. It occupied an area south of College and Gerrard between University and Logan Ave. In 1926 there was a major redistribution of Ontario seats which resulted in Toronto Southeast being split between three new ridings: St. George, St. David, and Riverdale.

The riding was a dual riding in that it elected two members to the Ontario provincial legislature.

== Boundaries ==
In 1914 the riding was created out of parts of the Toronto South and Toronto East ridings. It bordered Toronto Harbour on the south. From the western border it followed Simcoe Street north to Queen Street West where it jogged a block east to University Avenue. It went north along University to College Street. It then went east following College until it turned into Carlton Street at Yonge Street. It continued east along Carlton until it reached Parliament Street. It turned south until Gerrard Street East and then went east along Gerrard until it reached Logan Avenue. From here it went south back to Lake Ontario.

In 1926 there was a major redistribution of Ontario seats which resulted in Toronto Southeast being split between the new ridings of St. George, St. David, and Riverdale.

== Members of Provincial Parliament ==
Parliament	Years	Member	Party
prior to 1914 part of the Toronto South and Toronto East ridings
Seat A
14th	1914–1919	Edward Owens	Conservative
15th	1919–1922	John O'Neill (Note: Died January 6, 1922 while in office.)	Liberal
15th	1922–1923	John Currie	Conservative
16th	1923–1926	John Currie	Conservative
Seat B
14th	1914–1919	Thomas Hook	Conservative
15th	1919–1923	James Walter Curry	Liberal
16th	1923–1926	Edward Owens	Conservative
		Sourced from the Ontario Legislative Assembly	
merged into the St. George, St. David, and Riverdale after 1926

== Election results ==
Elections were run as separate races for Seat A and Seat B rather than a combined race.

=== Seat A ===
1914 Ontario general election
Party	Candidate	Votes	Vote %
Conservative	Edward Owens	4,296	75.2
Liberal	J.C. Allen	1,420	24.8
	Total	5,716	

1919 Ontario general election (Note: 1919 was the first election to allow women to vote, more than doubling the vote counts in each riding.)
Party	Candidate	Votes	Vote %
Liberal	John O'Neill	7,409	56.5
Conservative	W.D. Robbins	5,693	43.5
	Total		

By-election, 1922
Party	Candidate	Votes	Vote %
Conservative	John Currie	4,759	67.1
Independent-Liberal	John Callahan	1,106	15.6
Liberal	Claude Pearce	742	10.5
Labour	Maguire (Note: Only last name of candidate given.)	488	6.9
	Total	7,095	

1923 Ontario general election
Party	Candidate	Votes	Vote %
Conservative	John Currie	7,147	81.5
Labour	John Donahue	650	7.4
Liberal	Fred Hogg	635	7.2
Independent-Conservative	A.E. Burgess	339	3.9
	Total	8,771	

=== Seat B ===
1914 Ontario general election
Party	Candidate	Votes	Vote %
Conservative	Thomas Hook	4,390	70.6
Liberal	Albert Dale	1,567	25.2
Socialist	Isaac Brainbridge	262	4.2
	Total	6,219	

1919 Ontario general election
Party	Candidate	Votes	Vote %
Liberal	James Curry	10,105	67.0
Conservative	Harry Schofield	4,987	33.0
	Total	15,092	

1923 Ontario general election
Party	Candidate	Votes	Vote %
Conservative	Edward Owens	6,585	76.6
Liberal	John Callahan	1,165	13.5
Labour	J.T. Gunn	851	9.9
	Total	8,601	

== See also ==
- List of Ontario provincial electoral districts
- Canadian provincial electoral districts
