= Toronto Northwest (provincial electoral district) =

Former provincial electoral district in Ontario, Canada

Ontario electoral district
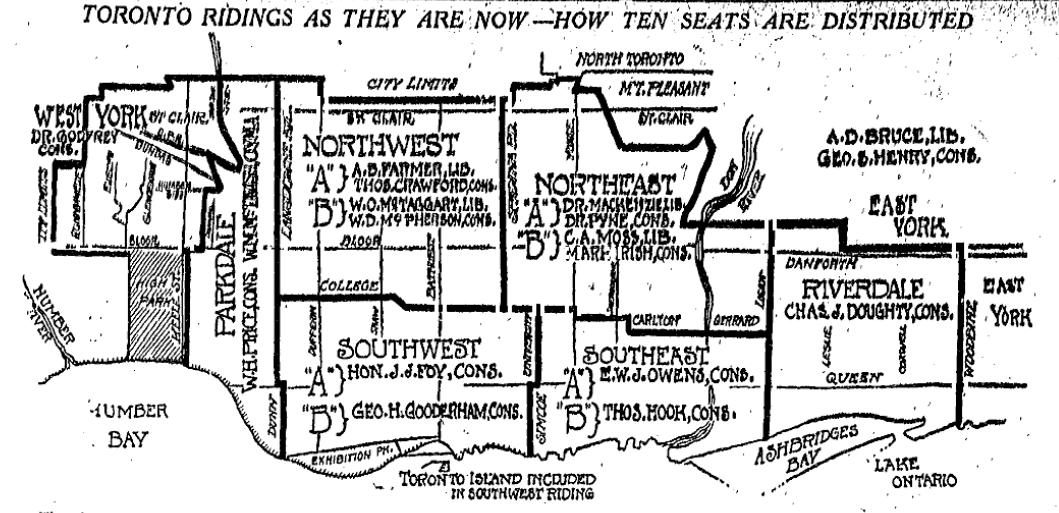
- Toronto Northwest in relation to other Toronto ridings in 1914

Defunct provincial electoral district
- Legislature: Legislative Assembly of Ontario
- District created: 1914
- District abolished: 1926
- First contested: 1914
- Last contested: 1923

Toronto Northwest was a provincial electoral district in Ontario, Canada, that existed from 1914 to 1926. It occupied an area north of college and Gerrard between Lansdowne and Spadina. In 1926 there was a major redistribution of Ontario seats which resulted in Toronto Northwest being split between five new ridings called from west to east, Brockton, Dovercourt, Bellwoods, St. Andrew, and St. Patrick.

The riding was a dual riding in that it elected two members to the Ontario provincial legislature.

== Boundaries ==
In 1914 the riding was parts of the Toronto North and Toronto West ridings. It bordered College Street, Lansdowne Avenue on the west, Spadina Avenue on the east and the city limits to the north.

In 1926 there was a major redistribution of Ontario seats which resulted in Toronto Northwest being split between the new ridings of Brockton, Dovercourt, Bellwoods, St. Andrew, and St. Patrick.

== Members of Provincial Parliament ==
Parliament	Years	Member	Party
Prior to 1914 part of Toronto North and Toronto West ridings
Seat A
14th	1914–1918	Thomas Crawford (Note: Resigned May 15, 1924 to take position of registrar of deeds with the City of Toronto.)	Conservative
15th	1919–1923	Thomas Crawford	Conservative
16th	1923–1924	Thomas Crawford	Conservative
16th	1924–1926	William Edwards	Conservative
Seat B
14th	1914–1919	William McPherson	Conservative
15th	1919–1923	Henry Cooper	Liberal
16th	1923–1926	Arthur Nesbitt	Conservative
		Sourced from the Ontario Legislative Assembly	
Merged into Brockton, Dovercourt, Bellwoods, St. Andrew, and St. Patrick after 1926

== Election results ==
Elections were run as separate races for Seat A and Seat B rather than a combined race.

=== Seat A ===
1914 Ontario general election
Party	Candidate	Votes (Note: 116 out of 152 polls reporting.)	Vote %
Conservative	Thomas Crawford	4,430	61.0
Liberal	Farmer (Note: Only last name of candidate given.)	2,838	39.0
	Total	7,268	

1919 Ontario general election (Note: This was the first election to allow women to vote, more than doubling the vote counts in each riding.)
Party	Candidate	Votes (Note: 257 out of 271 polls.)	Vote %
Conservative	Thomas Crawford	17,759	53.8
Liberal	James G. Cane	15,223	46.2
	Total	32,982	

1923 Ontario general election
Party	Candidate	Votes	Vote %
Conservative	Thomas Crawford	17,088	85.4
Liberal	H.S. Mullowney	2,917	14.6
	Total	20,005	

By-election 7 July 1924
Party	Candidate	Votes	Vote %
Conservative	William Edwards	7,640	81.9
Labour	J.A. Young	1,683	18.1
	Total	9,323	

=== Seat B ===
1914 Ontario general election
Party	Candidate	Votes	Vote %
Conservative	William McPherson	4,383	59.4
Liberal	McTaggart	2,649	35.9
Socialist	James	341	4.6
	Total	7,373	

1919 Ontario general election
Party	Candidate	Votes	Vote %
Liberal	Henry Cooper	17,515	51.9
Conservative	William McPherson	16,203	48.1
	Total	33,718	

1923 Ontario general election
Party	Candidate	Votes	Vote %
Conservative	Arthur Nesbitt	11,154	65.0
Progressive	W.E. Groves	3,706	20.9
Liberal	Henry Cooper	2,506	14.1
Total	17,726		

== See also ==
- List of Ontario provincial electoral districts
- Canadian provincial electoral districts
