= James Walter Curry =

Canadian politician

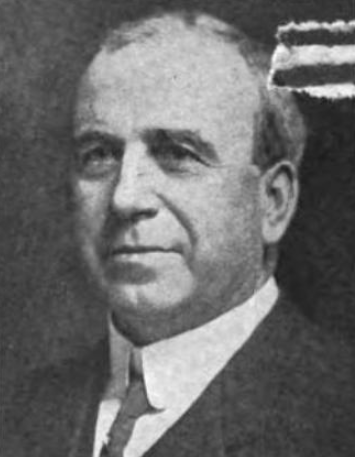

MPP for Toronto Southeast
- In office October 20, 1919 – May 10, 1923

Personal details
- Born: May 11, 1856 Port Hope, Canada West
- Died: May 5, 1924 (aged 67) Toronto, Ontario
- Party: Liberal Party of Ontario

James Walter Curry (May 11, 1856 – May 5, 1924) was an Ontario barrister and political figure. He represented Toronto Southeast in the Legislative Assembly of Ontario from 1919 to 1923 as a Liberal member.

He was born in Port Hope, Canada West, the son of James Curry. Curry practiced law in Port Hope, Millbrook and Toronto, where he became head of a law firm. He was also president of the Toronto Lacrosse Club. In 1884, he married Amy May Eyre. He served as Crown Attorney in Toronto from 1892 to 1906. He ran unsuccessfully for a seat in the provincial assembly in 1908. His son Walter was killed at Vimy Ridge . He died May 5, 1924.
