= Thomas Crawford (Canadian politician) =

Canadian politician

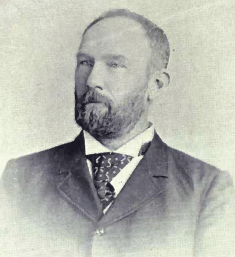

Ontario MPP
- In office 1914–1924
- Preceded by: New riding
- Succeeded by: William Edwards
- Constituency: Toronto Northwest - Seat A
- In office 1908–1914
- Preceded by: New riding
- Succeeded by: Riding abolished
- Constituency: Toronto West - Seat A
- In office 1894–1908
- Preceded by: New riding
- Succeeded by: Riding abolished
- Constituency: Toronto West

Personal details
- Born: August 14, 1847 County Fermanagh, Ireland
- Died: February 9, 1932 (aged 84) Toronto, Ontario
- Party: Conservative
- Occupation: Businessman

Thomas Crawford (August 14, 1847 – February 9, 1932) was speaker of the Legislature of Ontario in 1907-1911 and served as Conservative MLA for Toronto Northwest and Toronto West from 1894 to 1924.

He was born in County Fermanagh, Ireland in 1847, the son of James Crawford, and was educated in Inniskillen. He came to Toronto with his family around 1865 and began work with the Northern Railway Company. In 1868, he went into business with his father, a cattle merchant, later forming his own company which exported cattle to the United States and Britain. In 1878, he married Isabella Fyfe. From 1892 to 1894, he represented Ward 5 on Toronto city council.

Crawford served in the provincial cabinet as Minister Without Portfolio from 1923 to 1924. He resigned his seat in 1924 to become registrar of deeds for the city of Toronto. He died in 1932 and was interred at Mount Pleasant Cemetery in Toronto.
