= Essex South (federal electoral district) =

Former federal electoral district in Ontario, Canada

Ontario electoral district

Defunct federal electoral district
- Legislature: House of Commons
- District created: 1882
- District abolished: 1966
- First contested: 1882
- Last contested: 1965

Essex South was a federal and provincial electoral district represented in the House of Commons of Canada from 1882 to 1968. It was located in the province of Ontario. This riding was created in 1882 from parts of Essex riding.

It was created when the County of Essex was divided into two ridings: Essex North and Essex South. It initially consisted of the townships of Anderdon, Malden, North Colchester, South Colchester, Gosfield, Mersea, the town of Amherstburg, the villages of Leamington and Kingsville, and Pelée Island in the county of Essex.

In 1903, it was expanded to include the townships of Malden, Tilbury North, Tilbury West, Essex, and the portion of the village of Tilbury lying in the county of Essex. In 1914, it was expanded to include the village of Wheatley lying in the county of Essex.

In 1924, it was redefined to consist of the townships of Anderdon, Malden, Sandwich South, Colchester (North and South), Gosfield (North and South), Mersea and Pelee Island in the county of Essex, and the part of the village of Wheatley lying in the county of Kent. In 1933, it was expanded to exclude the township of Sandwich South, and the village of Wheatley. In 1947, it was redefined to include Pelee Island, Sandwich South, Tilbury West and the town of Essex, and exclude the village of Wheatley and the town of Tilbury.

In 1952, it was redefined to consist of the townships of Anderdon, Malden, Colchester (North and South), Gosfield (North and South), Mersea, Pelee Island, Sandwich South, Tilbury West and the town of Essex but excluding the village of Wheatley.

The electoral district was abolished in 1966 when it was redistributed between Essex and Essex—Kent ridings.

== Members of Parliament ==
This riding elected the following members of the House of Commons of Canada:

Parliament	Years	Member	Party
Riding created from Essex
5th	1882–1887	Lewis Wigle	Conservative
6th	1887–1891	James Brien	Liberal
7th	1891–1896	Henry William Allan	Liberal
8th	1896–1900	Mahlon K. Cowan	Liberal
9th	1900–1904	Mahlon K. Cowan	Liberal
10th	1904–1908	Alfred Henry Clarke	Liberal
11th	1908–1911	Alfred Henry Clarke	Liberal
12th	1911–1917	Alfred Henry Clarke	Liberal
13th	1917–1921	John Wesley Brien	Government (Unionist)
14th	1921–1921	George Perry Graham	Liberal
14th	1922–1925	George Perry Graham	Liberal
15th	1925–1926	Eccles James Gott	Conservative
16th	1926–1930	Eccles James Gott	Conservative
17th	1930–1935	Eccles James Gott	Conservative
18th	1935–1940	Murray Clark	Liberal
19th	1940–1945	Murray Clark	Liberal
20th	1945–1949	Murray Clark	Liberal
21st	1949–1953	Murray Clark	Liberal
22nd	1953–1957	Murray Clark	Liberal
23rd	1957–1958	Richard Thrasher	Progressive Conservative
24th	1958–1962	Richard Thrasher	Progressive Conservative
25th	1962–1963	Eugene Whelan	Liberal
26th	1963–1965	Eugene Whelan	Liberal
27th	1965–1968	Eugene Whelan	Liberal
Riding dissolved into Essex and Essex—Kent

== Election results ==
=== Federal ===
1882 Canadian federal election
Party	Candidate	Votes
Conservative	Lewis Wigle	1,475
Liberal	William McGregor	1,415

1887 Canadian federal election
Party	Candidate	Votes
Liberal	James Brien	2,177
Conservative	Lewis Wigle	2,144

1891 Canadian federal election
Party	Candidate	Votes
Liberal	Henry William Allan	2,390
Conservative	Lewis Wigle	2,333

1896 Canadian federal election
Party	Candidate	Votes
Liberal	Mahlon K. Cowan	2,426
Conservative	S. A. King	2,244

1900 Canadian federal election
Party	Candidate	Votes
Liberal	Mahlon K. Cowan	2,539
Conservative	Lewis Wigle	2,456

1904 Canadian federal election
Party	Candidate	Votes
Liberal	Alfred Henry Clarke	3,193
Conservative	Lewis Wigle	2,780

1908 Canadian federal election
Party	Candidate	Votes
Liberal	Alfred Henry Clarke	3,334
Conservative	Darius Wigle	2,611

1911 Canadian federal election
Party	Candidate	Votes
Liberal	Alfred Henry Clarke	2,946
Conservative	William Frederick Park	2,745

1917 Canadian federal election
Party	Candidate	Votes
Government (Unionist)	John Wesley Brien	3,645
Opposition (Laurier Liberals)	Robert Atkin	3,476

1921 Canadian federal election
Party	Candidate	Votes
Liberal	George Perry Graham	4,968
Progressive	Thomas James Willan	4,455
Conservative	Eugene S. Scratch	2,953

On Mr. Graham's being named Minister of Militia and Defence, 29 December 1921, and Minister of Naval Service, 29 December 1921:

By-election on 19 January 1922
Party	Candidate	Votes
Liberal	George Perry Graham	acclaimed

1925 Canadian federal election
Party	Candidate	Votes
Conservative	Eccles James Gott	6,851
Liberal	George Perry Graham	6,017

1926 Canadian federal election
Party	Candidate	Votes
Conservative	Eccles James Gott	6,761
Liberal	Thomas Rowley	6,438

1930 Canadian federal election
Party	Candidate	Votes
Conservative	Eccles James Gott	8,261
Liberal	John Clarence Montgomery	6,281

1935 Canadian federal election
Party	Candidate	Votes
Liberal	Murray Clark	5,592
Conservative	Eccles James Gott	4,889
Unknown	James Ramsey Morris	2,563

1940 Canadian federal election
Party	Candidate	Votes
Liberal	Murray Clark	7,624
National Government	Albert Leonard Bruner	5,457

1945 Canadian federal election
Party	Candidate	Votes
Liberal	Murray Clark	7,875
Progressive Conservative	William D. Conklin	7,540
Co-operative Commonwealth	Edward Amos McGee	574

1949 Canadian federal election
Party	Candidate	Votes
Liberal	Murray Clark	10,427
Progressive Conservative	Fred Jasperson	9,110

1953 Canadian federal election
Party	Candidate	Votes
Liberal	Murray Clark	10,620
Progressive Conservative	Percy McKee	7,420

1957 Canadian federal election
Party	Candidate	Votes
Progressive Conservative	Richard Thrasher	10,006
Liberal	Robert M. Clark	9,580
Co-operative Commonwealth	E. Lee MacMillan	775
Social Credit	Edgar B. Charron	311

1958 Canadian federal election
Party	Candidate	Votes
Progressive Conservative	Richard Thrasher	14,326
Liberal	Thomas Charles Odette	8,222
Co-operative Commonwealth	George Haggar	861

1962 Canadian federal election
Party	Candidate	Votes
Liberal	Eugene Whelan	11,397
Progressive Conservative	Richard Thrasher	10,409
New Democratic	Val Cervin	1,342
Unknown	Jack Backer	284

1963 Canadian federal election
Party	Candidate	Votes
Liberal	Eugene Whelan	12,947
Progressive Conservative	Richard Thrasher	12,178
Social Credit	Jack Backer	419

1965 Canadian federal election
Party	Candidate	Votes
Liberal	Eugene Whelan	12,887
Progressive Conservative	Richard Thrasher	10,072
New Democratic	Donald E. Bertrand	1,329

=== Provincial (partial) ===
Ontario provincial by-election, December 2, 1993: Essex South
Party	Candidate	Votes
Liberal	Bruce Crozier	12,736
Progressive Conservative	Joan Flood	3,295
New Democratic	David Maris	1,100
Family Coalition	Joyce Ann Cherryr	1,060
Green	Michael Green	132
Independent	John Turmel	84

== See also ==
- List of Canadian electoral districts
- Historical federal electoral districts of Canada
