= William Balfour (politician) =

Canadian politician

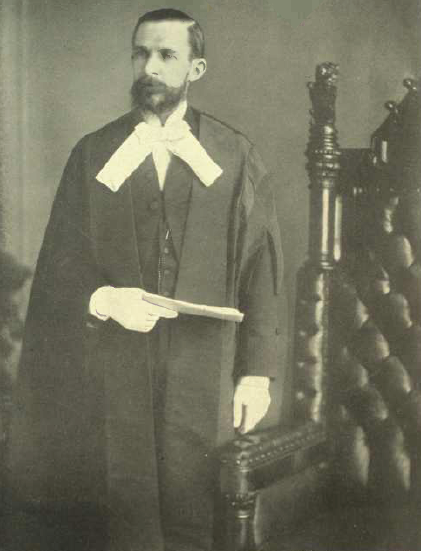

Ontario MPP
- In office 1882–1896
- Preceded by: Lewis Wigle
- Succeeded by: John Allan Auld
- Constituency: Essex South

Personal details
- Born: August 2, 1851 Forfar, Scotland
- Died: August 19, 1896 (aged 45) Toronto, Ontario
- Party: Liberal
- Spouse: Josephie Brodhead (m. 1874)
- Occupation: Teacher

William Douglas Balfour (August 2, 1851 – August 19, 1896) was a speaker for the Legislature of Ontario in 1895–1896 and served as Liberal MLA for Essex South from 1882 to 1896.

He was born in Forfar, Scotland in 1851, the son of David Balfour and Janet Douglas, and came to St. Catharines, Canada West, with his family in 1857. He studied at the Grantham Academy and went on to teach school in Grantham and Louth townships. In 1872, with Robert Matheson, he became the owner of the St. Catharines News. Balfour moved to Amherstburg in 1874 and became owner of the Amherstburg Echo with John Allan Auld. He married Josephine Brodhead that same year. Balfour served as reeve for Amherstburg from 1878 to 1882. He ran unsuccessfully in the provincial riding of Essex South in 1879 but was later elected in that riding in an 1882 by-election after Lewis Wigle was elected to the federal parliament.

In 1884, Balfour reported that he had been offered a bribe to withdraw his support from the government of Oliver Mowat. During his time in office, he opposed provincial toll-roads and supported the vote for women and the admission of women to the practice of law. Balfour also introduced a bill in 1884 which authorized Delos Rogest Davis, the son of a former slave, to practice law in Ontario.

In July 1896, Balfour was named provincial secretary. He died in office in Toronto a short time later that year, aged 45, from complications caused by tuberculosis and was buried at Amherstburg.

His son, David A. Balfour, became a prominent municipal politician in Toronto.

== Electoral history ==
1879 Ontario general election: Essex South
Party	Candidate	Votes	%	±%
Conservative	Lewis Wigle	1,418	52.93	−5.60
Liberal	William Balfour	1,261	47.07	+5.60
Total valid votes		2,679	74.29	
Eligible voters		3,606		
Conservative hold		Swing		−5.60
Source: Elections Ontario

Mowat ministry, Province of Ontario (1872–1896)
Cabinet post (1)
Predecessor	Office	Successor
John Gibson	Provincial Secretary and Registrar; 1896 (July–August)	Elihu Davis
