= Anthony Leardi =

Canadian politician

Anthony Leardi MPP
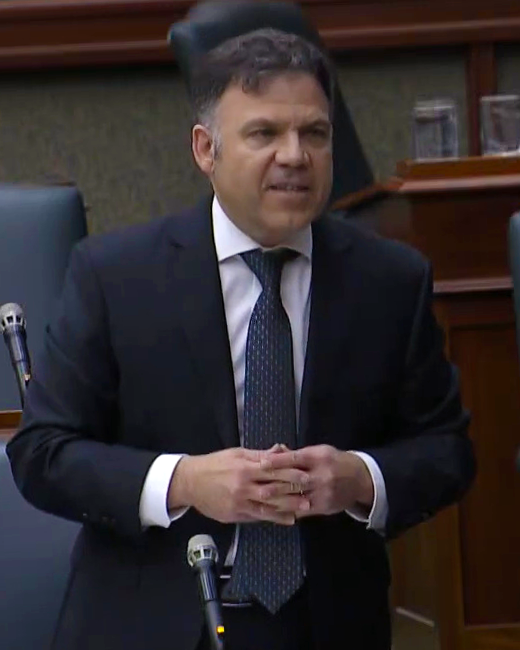
- Leardi in 2024

Member of the Ontario Provincial Parliament for Essex
- Incumbent
- Assumed office June 2, 2022
- Preceded by: Taras Natyshak

Personal details
- Born: Amherstburg, Ontario
- Party: Progressive Conservative
- Spouse: Jackie Leardi
- Children: 3
- Profession: Lawyer

Anthony Leardi, KC, MPP is a Canadian politician, who was elected to the Legislative Assembly of Ontario in the 2022 provincial election. He represents the riding of Essex as a member of the Progressive Conservative Party of Ontario. He is the first Progressive Conservative member for the area since 1959. Previously, Leardi served as the Deputy Mayor of Amherstburg, Ontario.

== Biography ==
Anthony Leardi is a lawyer with 23 years of experience, holding an undergraduate degree in history from McGill University, an undergraduate degree in education from the University of Windsor, and a law degree from Western University. He is married to Jackie Leardi and has three children.

== Amherstburg Town Council ==
Leardi was first elected to the Amherstburg Town Council as a Councillor in 2000. After three years, he stepped down as Councillor to successfully run for Deputy Mayor, which he served from 2004 to 2006.

== Member of Provincial Parliament ==
Leardi currently serves as Deputy House Leader and as the Parliamentary Assistant to the Minister of Health. He has previously served as Parliamentary Assistant to the Minister of Mines. He is also a member of the Standing Committee on Social Policy.

== Electoral record ==
2025 Ontario general election: Essex
Party	Candidate	Votes	%	±%	Expenditures
Progressive Conservative	Anthony Leardi	30,785	55.60	+4.50	$65,811
New Democratic	Rachael Mills	12,047	21.76	–6.52	$36,286
Liberal	Tamara Stomp	8,707	15.73	+7.15	$16,622
Green	Steve Higgins	1,282	2.32	+0.28	$3,467
Ontario Party	Travis Jacques	1,131	2.04	–4.77	$1,975
New Blue	Brigitte Belton	882	1.59	–1.06	$0
None of the Above	Kevin Linfield	469	0.85	+0.19	$0
Independent	William Szabo Verzoc	204	0.37	N/A	
Total valid votes/expense limit		55,366	99.33	-0.17	$169,676
Total rejected, unmarked, and declined ballots		376	0.67	+0.17	
Turnout		55,742	51.10	+3.83	
Eligible voters		109,089			
Progressive Conservative hold		Swing		+5.50	
Source: Elections Ontario

2022 Ontario general election: Essex
Party	Candidate	Votes	%	±%	Expenditures
Progressive Conservative	Anthony Leardi	24,926	51.10	+8.12	$56,154
New Democratic	Ron Leclair	13,793	28.28	−19.67	$99,831
Liberal	Manpreet Brar	4,186	8.58	+3.03	$44,182
Ontario Party	Frank Causarano	3,322	6.81		$0
New Blue	Danielle Sylvester	1,293	2.65		$8,086
Green	Nicholas Wendler	989	2.03	−1.50	$0
None of the Above	Kevin Linfield	271	0.56		$283
Total valid votes/expense limit		48,780	99.50	+0.16	$145,387
Total rejected, unmarked, and declined ballots		245	0.50	-0.16	
Turnout		49,025	47.21	-8.91	
Eligible voters		101,723			
Progressive Conservative gain from New Democratic		Swing		+13.90	
Source(s): "Summary of Valid Votes Cast for Each Candidate" (PDF). Elections Ontario. 2022. Archived from the original on 2023-05-18.; "Statistical Summary by Electoral District" (PDF). Elections Ontario. 2022. Archived from the original on 2023-05-21.
