= Richard Thrasher =

Canadian politician

Richard Devere Thrasher

Member of Parliament for Essex South
- In office June 1957 – June 1962
- Preceded by: Stuart Murray Clark
- Succeeded by: Eugene Whelan

Personal details
- Born: 5 March 1922 Amherstburg, Ontario, Canada
- Died: 11 October 1993 (aged 71)
- Party: Progressive Conservative
- Profession: barrister, solicitor

Richard Devere Thrasher (5 March 1922 – 11 October 1993) was a Progressive Conservative party member of the House of Commons of Canada. He was born in Amherstburg, Ontario and became a barrister and solicitor by career.

He was first elected at the Essex South riding in the 1957 general election and re-elected in the 1958 election during which time he served as Parliamentary Secretary to the Minister of Labour (1959–1961, and early 1962).

Thrasher was defeated by the Liberal party's Eugene Whelan in the 1962 election and was unsuccessful in unseating Whelan at Essex South in the 1963 and 1965 elections.
