= John Allan Auld =

Canadian politician

Ontario MPP
- In office 1896–1908
- Preceded by: William Balfour
- Succeeded by: Charles Anderson
- Constituency: Essex South

Personal details
- Born: June 22, 1853 Warwick, Lambton County, Canada West
- Died: August 10, 1924 (aged 71) Warwick, Ontario
- Party: Liberal
- Spouse: Anna Hamilton (m. 1877)
- Occupation: Newspaper owner

John Allan Auld (June 22, 1853 – August 8, 1924) was an Ontario newspaper owner and political figure. He represented Essex South in the Legislative Assembly of Ontario as a Liberal member from 1896 to 1908.

He was born in Warwick, Lambton County, Canada West, the son of John Auld, a Scottish immigrant. Auld apprenticed as a printer with Charles H. Mackintosh in Strathroy. He established the Amherstburg Echo with William Douglas Balfour in 1874. In 1877, Auld married Anna Hamilton. He served on the public school board for Amherstburg and was reeve from 1885 to 1896. In 1890, he was warden for Essex County. Auld was elected to the provincial legislature in an 1896 by-election held after the death of William Balfour, his former partner. He died in Warwick in 1924.

His brother William H. Auld was editor of The Essex Free Press.
