= John Wesley Brien =

Canadian politician

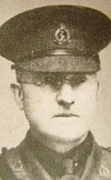

Member of the Canadian Parliament for Essex South
- In office 1917–1921
- Preceded by: Alfred Henry Clarke
- Succeeded by: George Perry Graham

Personal details
- Born: November 24, 1864 Victoria County, Canada West
- Died: January 11, 1949 (aged 84)
- Party: Unionist Party
- Occupation: physician

John Wesley Brien (November 24, 1864 - January 11, 1949) was a Canadian politician and physician. He was elected to the House of Commons of Canada in the 1917 election as a Member of the Unionist Party to represent the riding of Essex South. Prior to his federal political career, he had just served a year in the Canadian Expeditionary Force as a medical officer before being forced to return home due to injury. He also served as a captain in the British Canadian Recruiting Mission in Chicago, Illinois, United States of America.

Brien was born in Victoria County, Canada West. His cousin, James Brien, was also a Member of the House of Commons of Canada.
