= Solomon Wigle =

Canadian politician

Solomon Shepley Wigle

Ontario MPP
- In office 1867–1871
- Preceded by: Riding established
- Succeeded by: Albert Prince
- Constituency: Essex

Personal details
- Born: May 14, 1822 Gosfield Township, Essex County, Upper Canada
- Died: May 1, 1898 (aged 75) Kingsville, Ontario
- Party: Conservative
- Spouse(s): Maria Schwenk, Ann Iler (m. 1860)
- Relations: Lewis Wigle, son, Ernest S. Wigle, son
- Children: 8
- Occupation: Businessman

Solomon Wigle (May 14, 1822 – May 1, 1898) was an Ontario businessman and political figure. He represented Essex in the Legislative Assembly of Ontario from 1867 to 1871 as a Conservative member.

He was born in Gosfield Township, Essex County, Upper Canada in 1822, the son of John Wigle. Originally of German origin, the family changed the spelling of their surname from Weigele to Wigle after settling in the United States. Wigle also served as reeve for the township and warden for Essex County. He married Ann Iler. In 1860, Wigle was awarded the contract for transporting mail between Leamington and Windsor. He later moved to Kingsville, where he was the township treasurer, and served in that function until his death in 1898.

His son Lewis Wigle represented Essex South in the Ontario legislative assembly and the House of Commons. His daughter Esther married doctor Sidney Arthur King, son of the founder of Kingsville.

== Electoral history ==
1867 Ontario general election: Essex
Party	Candidate	Votes	%
Conservative	Solomon Wigle	1,566	53.69
Liberal	A. Cameron	1,351	46.31
Total valid votes		2,917	75.41
Eligible voters		3,868	
Conservative pickup new district.			
Source: Elections Ontario

1871 Ontario general election: Essex
Party	Candidate	Votes	%	±%
Liberal	Albert Prince	1,204	51.23	+4.92
Conservative	Solomon Wigle	786	33.45	−20.24
Independent	Mr. Rankin	360	15.32	
Turnout		2,350	50.95	−24.46
Eligible voters		4,612		
Liberal gain from Conservative		Swing		+12.58
Source: Elections Ontario
