= James Brien =

Canadian politician (1848–1907)

Member of the Canadian Parliament for Essex South
- In office 1887–1891
- Preceded by: Lewis Wigle
- Succeeded by: Henry William Allan

Personal details
- Born: February 4, 1848 Howard Township, Canada West
- Died: August 10, 1907 (aged 59)
- Party: Liberal
- Occupation: physician

James Brien (February 4, 1848 — August 10, 1907) was a politician and physician. He was elected to the House of Commons of Canada in the 1887 election as a Member of the Liberal Party to represent the riding of Essex South. After his federal political career, he became mayor of Essex Centre, Ontario, in 1895 for a term of eight years where he also served as a reeve and a councillor for three years. His cousin, John Wesley Brien, was also a Member of the Canadian House of Commons.
