= Milton C. Fox =

Canadian politician from Ontario

Member of the Ontario Provincial Parliament for Essex South
- In office October 20, 1919 – May 10, 1923
- Preceded by: Lambert Peter Wigle
- Succeeded by: Adolphus T. Armstrong

Personal details
- Party: United Farmers of Ontario

Milton C. Fox was a Canadian politician from the United Farmers of Ontario. He represented Essex South in the Legislative Assembly of Ontario from 1919 to 1923.

== See also ==
- 15th Parliament of Ontario
