= Austin Burton Smith =

Canadian politician from Ontario

Member of the Ontario Provincial Parliament for Essex South
- In office September 30, 1929 – April 3, 1934
- Preceded by: Charles George Fletcher
- Succeeded by: Lambert Peter Wigle

Personal details
- Party: Conservative

Austin Burton Smith was a Canadian politician from the Conservative Party of Ontario. He represented Essex South in the Legislative Assembly of Ontario from 1929 to 1934.

== See also ==
- 18th Parliament of Ontario
