= Lambert Peter Wigle =

Canadian politician

Ontario MPP
- In office 1934–1937
- Preceded by: Austin Burton Smith
- Succeeded by: Charles George Fletcher
- In office 1914–1919
- Preceded by: Charles Anderson
- Succeeded by: Milton C. Fox
- Constituency: Essex South

Personal details
- Born: June 17, 1867 Gosfield, Essex County, Ontario
- Died: October 3, 1941 (aged 74) Essex County, Ontario, Canada
- Party: Liberal
- Spouse: Jennie Grainger (m. 1900)
- Occupation: Farmer

Lambert Peter Wigle (June 17, 1867 – October 3, 1941) was a Canadian farmer and political figure in Ontario. He represented Essex South in the Legislative Assembly of Ontario from 1914 to 1919 and from 1934 to 1937 as a Liberal member.

He was born in Gosfield, Essex County, the son of Philip Wigle, a United Empire Loyalist of Pennsylvania Dutch descent, and Hannah Wright. In 1900, he married Jennie Grainger. Wigle served as reeve of Gosfield South for seven years and also was a member of the council for Essex County. He died October 3, 1941.
