= Essex (provincial electoral district) =

Provincial electoral district in Ontario, Canada

Coordinates: 42.128°N 82.787°W

Ontario electoral district
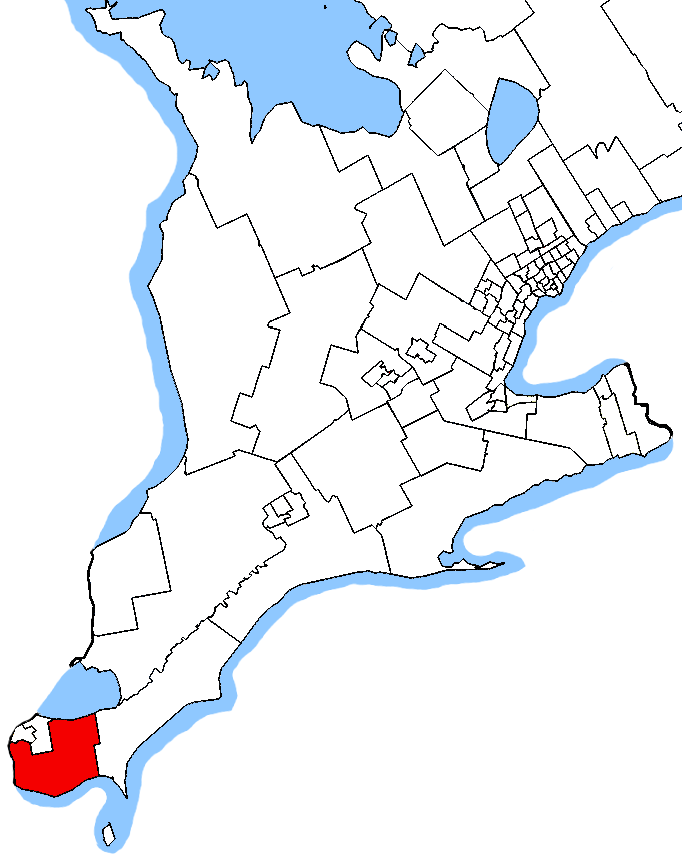
- Essex in relation to other southern Ontario electoral districts

Provincial electoral district
- Legislature: Legislative Assembly of Ontario
MPP
Anthony Leardi
Progressive Conservative
- District created: 1999
- First contested: 1999
- Last contested: 2025

Demographics
- Population (2016): 125,440
- Electors (2018): 97,773
- Area (km²): 2,272
- Pop. density (per km²): 55.2
- Census division: Essex County
- Census subdivision(s): Amherstburg, Essex, Kingsville, Lakeshore, LaSalle

Essex is a provincial electoral district in southwestern, Ontario, Canada. It elects one member to the Legislative Assembly of Ontario. It existed from 1867 to 1874 and was re-created in 1999 from Essex South, Essex—Kent and Windsor—Sandwich.

When the riding was recreated, it included all of Essex County except for Windsor, Old Tecumseh, St. Clair Beach, Leamington and Mersea Township.

In 2007, it lost the parts of Tecumseh that had since been amalgamated (South Sandwich Township).

== Member of Provincial Parliament ==
This riding has elected the following members of the Legislative Assembly of Ontario:

Essex
Assembly	Years	Member	Party
1st	1867–1871	Solomon Wigle	Conservative
2nd	1871–1874	Albert Prince	Liberal
Riding dissolved into Essex North and Essex South
Riding re-created from Essex South, Essex—Kent and Windsor—Sandwich
37th	1999–2003	Bruce Crozier	Liberal
38th	2003–2007	Bruce Crozier	Liberal
39th	2007–2011	Bruce Crozier	Liberal
40th	2011–2014	Taras Natyshak	New Democratic
41st	2014–2018	Taras Natyshak	New Democratic
42nd	2018–2022	Taras Natyshak	New Democratic
43rd	2022–2025	Anthony Leardi	Progressive Conservative
44th	2025–present	Anthony Leardi	Progressive Conservative

== Election results ==
=== 1999-present ===
Winning party in each polling division of Essex at the 2025 Ontario general election

2025 Ontario general election
Party	Candidate	Votes	%	±%	Expenditures
Progressive Conservative	Anthony Leardi	30,790	55.61	+4.51	$65,811
New Democratic	Rachael Mills	12,047	21.76	–6.52	$36,286
Liberal	Tamara Stomp	8,707	15.73	+7.14	$16,622
Green	Stephen Higgins	1,282	2.32	+0.29	$3,467
New Blue	Brigitte Belton	940	1.70	–0.95	$0
Ontario Party	Travis Jacques	931	1.68	–5.13	$1,975
None of the Above	Kevin Linfield	469	0.85	+0.29	$0
Independent	William Szabo Verzoc	200	0.36	–	$0
Total valid votes/expense limit		55,366	99.33	–	$169,676
Total rejected, unmarked and declined ballots		376	0.67	+0.17	
Turnout		55,742	50.34	+3.13	
Eligible voters		110,725			
Progressive Conservative hold		Swing		+5.52	
Source: Elections Ontario

Winning party in each polling division of Essex at the 2022 Ontario general election

2022 Ontario general election
Party	Candidate	Votes	%	±%	Expenditures
Progressive Conservative	Anthony Leardi	24,926	51.10	+8.12	$56,154
New Democratic	Ron Leclair	13,793	28.28	–19.67	$99,831
Liberal	Manpreet Brar	4,186	8.58	+3.03	$44,182
Ontario Party	Frank Causarano	3,322	6.81	–	$0
New Blue	Danielle Sylvester	1,293	2.65	–	$8,086
Green	Nicholas Wendler	989	2.03	–1.50	$0
None of the Above	Kevin Linfield	271	0.56	–	$283
Total valid votes/expense limit		48,780	99.50	–	$145,387
Total rejected, unmarked and declined ballots		245	0.50	–0.16	
Turnout		49,025	47.21	–8.91	
Eligible voters		103,848			
Progressive Conservative gain from New Democratic		Swing		+13.90	
Source: Elections Ontario

2018 Ontario general election
Party	Candidate	Votes	%	±%
New Democratic	Taras Natyshak	26,134	47.95	–12.36
Progressive Conservative	Chris Lewis	23,423	42.98	+21.20
Liberal	Kate Festeryga	3,026	5.55	–8.78
Green	Nancy Pancheshan	1,920	3.52	–0.06
Total valid votes		54,503	99.34	
Total rejected, unmarked and declined ballots		363	0.66	–0.59
Turnout		54,866	56.12	+5.92
Eligible voters		97,773		
New Democratic hold		Swing		–16.78
Source: Elections Ontario

2014 general election redistributed results
Party	Vote	%
New Democratic	26,807	60.31
Progressive Conservative	9,677	21.77
Liberal	6,369	14.33
Green	1,593	3.58

2014 Ontario general election
Party	Candidate	Votes	%	±%
New Democratic	Taras Natyshak	28,118	60.34	+22.35
Progressive Conservative	Ray Cecile	10,169	21.82	–13.19
Liberal	Crystal Meloche	6,628	14.22	–10.90
Green	Mark Vercouteren	1,685	3.62	+1.74
Total valid votes		46,600	98.75	
Total rejected, unmarked and declined ballots		592	1.25	+0.89
Turnout		47,192	50.20	–1.18
Eligible voters		94,008		
New Democratic hold		Swing		+17.77
Source: Elections Ontario

2011 Ontario general election
Party	Candidate	Votes	%	±%
New Democratic	Taras Natyshak	17,417	37.99	+17.22
Progressive Conservative	Dave Brister	16,049	35.01	+10.00
Liberal	Ken Schmidt	11,518	25.12	–22.90
Green	Jason Matyi	860	1.88	–3.46
Total valid votes		45,844	99.63	
Total rejected, unmarked and declined ballots		168	0.37	–0.44
Turnout		46,012	51.38	+2.69
Eligible voters		89,549		
New Democratic gain from Liberal		Swing		+20.06
Source: Elections Ontario

2007 Ontario general election
Party	Candidate	Votes	%	±%
Liberal	Bruce Crozier	19,970	48.02	+2.74
Progressive Conservative	Richard Kniaziew	10,400	25.01	+0.27
New Democratic	John Grima	8,638	20.77	–7.01
Green	Jessica Fracassi	2,220	5.34	+3.14
Libertarian	Aaron Parent	358	0.86	–
Total valid votes		41,586	99.20	
Total rejected, unmarked and declined ballots		336	0.80	+0.04
Turnout		41,922	48.69	–4.68
Eligible voters		86,101		
Liberal hold		Swing		+1.24
Source: Elections Ontario

2003 Ontario general election
Party	Candidate	Votes	%	±%
Liberal	Bruce Crozier	20,559	45.28	–11.45
New Democratic	Patrick Michael Hayes	12,614	27.78	+19.43
Progressive Conservative	Patrick O'Neil	11,234	24.74	–9.49
Green	Darren J. Brown	998	2.20	–
Total valid votes		45,405	99.24	
Total rejected, unmarked and declined ballots		349	0.76	–0.02
Turnout		45,754	53.36	–3.63
Eligible voters		85,738		
Liberal hold		Swing		–15.44
Source: Elections Ontario

1999 Ontario general election
Party	Candidate	Votes	%
Liberal	Bruce Crozier	25,446	56.73
Progressive Conservative	Patrick O'Neil	15,354	34.23
New Democratic	Merv Richards	3,745	8.35
Independent	Enver Villamizar	307	0.68
Total valid votes		44,852	99.21
Total rejected, unmarked and declined ballots		355	0.79
Turnout		45,207	56.99
Eligible voters		79,320	
Liberal pickup new district.			
Source: Elections Ontario

=== 1867–1871 ===
1871 Ontario general election
Party	Candidate	Votes	%	±%
Liberal	Albert Prince	1,204	51.23	+4.92
Conservative	Solomon Wigle	786	33.45	−20.24
Independent	Mr. Rankin	360	15.32	
Turnout		2,350	50.95	−24.46
Eligible voters		4,612		
Liberal gain from Conservative		Swing		+12.58
Source: Elections Ontario

1867 Ontario general election
Party	Candidate	Votes	%
Conservative	Solomon Wigle	1,566	53.69
Liberal	A. Cameron	1,351	46.31
Total valid votes		2,917	75.41
Eligible voters		3,868	
Conservative pickup new district.			
Source: Elections Ontario

== 2007 electoral reform referendum ==
2007 Ontario electoral reform referendum
Side	Votes	%
First Past the Post	27,130	67
Mixed member proportional	13,384	33
Total valid votes	40,514	100.0

== See also ==
- List of Ontario provincial electoral districts
- Canadian provincial electoral districts
