= Remo Mancini =

Canadian politician

The Honourable Remo Mancini
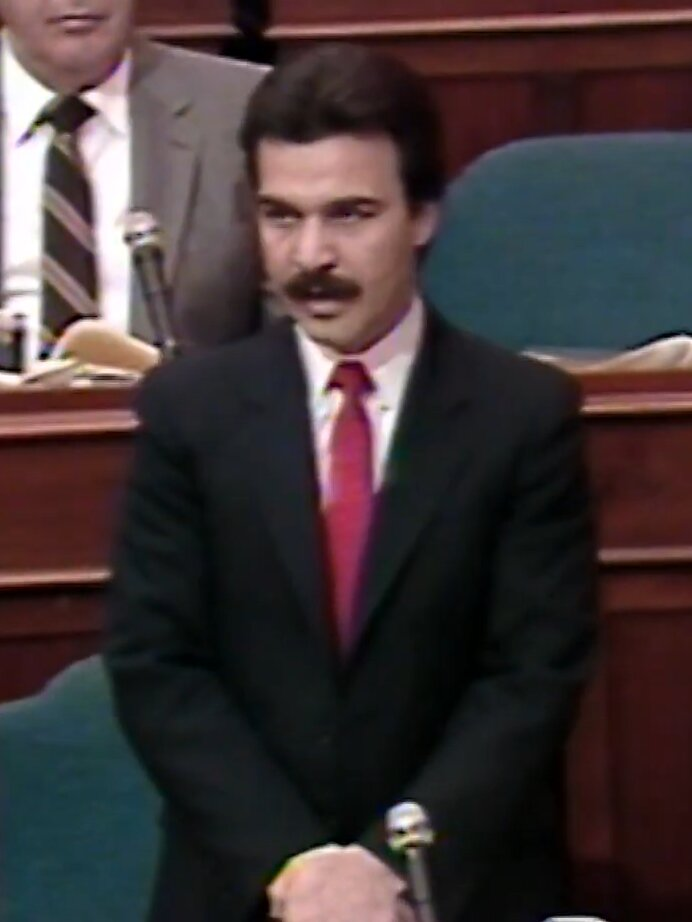
- Mancini in 1986

Ontario MPP
- In office 1975–1993
- Preceded by: Donald Paterson
- Succeeded by: Bruce Crozier
- Constituency: Essex South

Personal details
- Born: May 26, 1951 (age 75) Abbateggio, Province of Pescara, Italy
- Party: Liberal
- Occupation: Executive and Professional Corporate Director

Remo Mancini (born May 26, 1951) is a former senior corporate executive in both the U.S and Canada, former politician in Ontario, Canada, and corporate director serving on both private company and publicly listed corporate boards.

He was an elected member of the Legislative Assembly of Ontario representing the constituency of Essex South from 1975 to 1993. He also served as a cabinet minister in both economic and social portfolios (including Minister of Revenue) in the government of David Peterson.

== Background ==
Mancini was born in the small, remote mountain village of Abbateggio, Province of Pescara, Italy.

A high school all-Ontario gold medal gymnast, he received athletic scholarships to both U.S and Canadian universities. Injuries ended Mancini's athletic career and formal education.

Mancini is a graduate of the Corporate Governance College at the Rotman School of Management, University of Toronto. and received his internationally recognized ICD.D certification. The program is a joint initiative by Rotman and the Institute of Corporate Directors.

== Politics ==
In 1972, at 21 years of age Mancini was elected to the local municipal council of Anderdon township. In December 1974, Mancini was elected Deputy reeve of Anderdon Township and Essex County councillor at the age of 23.(the youngest person ever elected to the Essex County Council).

Mancini was elected to the provincial legislature as MPP the following year in the Ontario general election of 1975, defeating Progressive Conservative Frank Klees by just over 2,000 votes in Essex South. He defeated Klees again by a wider margin in the 1977 Ontario election, and easily retained his seat in the elections of 1981, 1985 and 1987.

The Liberal Party was able to form a minority government under David Peterson following the 1985 provincial election, after 42 years in opposition. Mancini was named as the Premier's parliamentary assistant from 1985 to 1987. He was promoted to Minister without portfolio responsible for disabled persons on September 29, 1987, and finally to Minister of Revenue on August 2, 1989.

The Liberal government was defeated by the New Democratic Party in the 1990 Ontario election. Mancini retained his seat and was the only Liberal MPP elected in the entire Windsor, Sarnia, London region.

Remo Mancini was elected the House Leader by the Liberal Caucus in a formal process and served until February 1992. While in opposition, Mancini was Chairman of the Public Accounts Committee. Mancini retired from the legislature on April 30, 1993.

=== Parliamentary positions ===
Special Parliamentary Responsibilities
Predecessor	Title	Successor
Murray Elston	Opposition House Leader; 1991–1992	Murray Elston
Peterson ministry, Province of Ontario (1985–1990)
Cabinet post (1)
Predecessor	Office	Successor
Bernard Grandmaître	Minister of Revenue; 1989–1990	Shelley Wark-Martyn
Special Cabinet Responsibilities
Predecessor	Title	Successor
New position	Minister Without Portfolio; 1987–1989; Responsible for Disabled Persons	Shirley Collins

== Corporate career ==
In February 1994, Mancini joined the Canadian Transit Company (as director of corporate affairs), which operates the Canadian portion of the Ambassador Bridge linking Windsor, Ontario, and Detroit, Michigan. Four months later, he was promoted to vice-president. When Mancini retired in 2004, he was executive vice president of both the Detroit International Bridge Company and the Canadian Transit Company . The Ambassador Bridge is privately owned, managed, and operated as the world's busiest international commercial border crossing.

In 2006, he was appointed to the board of advisors of Watts Energy, a Michigan-based energy company focused on renewable wind energy.

In 2007, Mancini was elected chairman of the board of the Windsor-Essex Development Commission (WEDC), a not-for-profit corporation that seeks to "maximize economic diversity, growth and prosperity" in Windsor and Essex. In March 2008, Mancini was appointed Acting Interim Executive Officer, making Mancini the WEDC's fifth CEO in five years. Mancini resigned, along with the entire WEDC Board of Directors in March 2009 due to political interference after publicly stating such interference was contrary to the principles under which the Dev. Com. was established.
