= William Murdoch (politician) =

Speaker of the Legislative Assembly of Ontario

Bill Murdoch
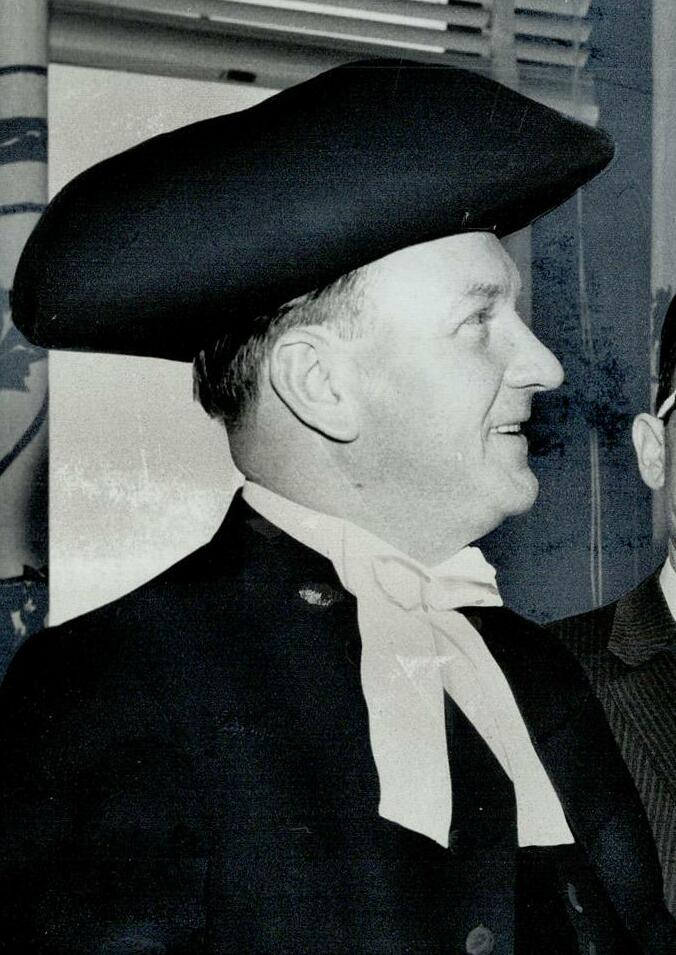

Ontario MPP
- In office 1943–1963
- Preceded by: Charles George Fletcher
- Succeeded by: Donald Paterson
- Constituency: Essex South

Personal details
- Born: June 15, 1904 Leeds, England
- Died: April 28, 1984 (aged 79) Amherstburg, Ontario, Canada
- Party: Progressive Conservative
- Spouse: Marie Bondy (m. 1932)
- Occupation: Municipal official

James William Murdoch (June 15, 1904 – April 28, 1984) was Speaker of the Legislative Assembly of Ontario from 1960 to 1963. He served as the Progressive Conservative MPP for Essex South from his election in 1943 until his defeat in 1963.

He was born in Leeds, England, the son of James Murdoch and Elizabeth Mary Hole, and was educated in England. Murdoch came to Canada, where he became a farmer, in 1923. In 1932, he married Marie Bondy. Murdoch served on the local school board and was treasurer on the municipal council for Harrow, Ontario. Murdoch was defeated when he ran for reelection in 1963. From 1968 to 1971 and from 1974 to 1976, he served on Amherstburg town council. He died in 1984 in Amherstburg. He is buried at Colchester Memorial Cemetery, Colchester, Ontario.
