= Murray Clark =

Canadian politician

S. Murray Clark

Member of the Canadian Parliament for Essex South
- In office October 1935 – April 1957
- Preceded by: Eccles James Gott
- Succeeded by: Richard Thrasher

Personal details
- Born: Stuart Murray Clark; 22 May 1899 Harrow, Ontario, Canada
- Died: 12 June 1973 (aged 74) St. Thomas, Ontario, Canada
- Party: Liberal
- Profession: manager

Stuart Murray Clark (22 May 1899 – 12 June 1973) was a Liberal party member of the House of Commons of Canada. He was born in Harrow, Ontario and became a manager by career.

He was first elected at the Essex South riding in the 1935 general election and re-elected for successive terms there in 1940, 1945, 1949 and 1953. After completing his final term of federal office, the 22nd Canadian Parliament, Clark left the House of Commons and did not seek re-election in 1957. He died in 1973 and is interred at Colchester Memorial Cemetery.
