= Charles Anderson (Canadian politician) =

Canadian physician and political figure

Ontario MPP
- In office 1908–1914
- Preceded by: John Allan Auld
- Succeeded by: Lambert Peter Wigle
- Constituency: Essex South

Personal details
- Born: January 14, 1858 Stephen Township, Huron County, Canada West
- Died: June 8, 1939 (aged 81) Windsor, Ontario
- Party: Conservative
- Spouse: Libbie Smith (m. 1890)
- Occupation: Teacher

Charles N. Anderson (January 14, 1858 – June 8, 1939) was a Canadian physician and politician in the province of Ontario. He represented Essex South in the Legislative Assembly of Ontario as a member of the Conservative from 1908 to 1914.

He was born in Stephen Township, Huron County, Canada West, the son of James Anderson, and attended school in Leamington. He taught school in Tilbury West Township for several years, went on to study medicine at Trinity College and set up practice in Comber. He served on the public school board there and also served as medical health officer for the town. In 1890, he married Libbie Smith. In 1903, Anderson returned to Leamington. He died at Windsor on June 8, 1939.
