= Mahlon K. Cowan =

Canadian politician

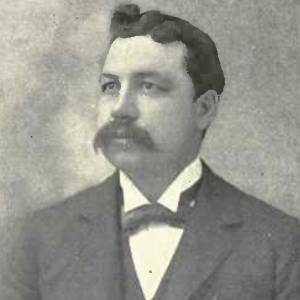

Member of the Canadian Parliament for Essex South
- In office 1896–1904
- Preceded by: Henry William Allan
- Succeeded by: Alfred Henry Clarke

Personal details
- Born: May 10, 1863 Blytheswood, Canada West
- Died: October 28, 1917 (aged 54) Toronto, Ontario
- Party: Liberal

Mahlon K. Cowan, KC (May 10, 1863 – October 28, 1917) was a lawyer and political figure in Ontario, Canada. He represented Essex South in the House of Commons of Canada from 1896 to 1904 as a Liberal.

He was born in Blytheswood, Canada West, the son of Walter Cowan, an Irish immigrant, and Mary Ann Kitchen. Cowan was educated in Brantford and Collingwood, went on to study law with Arthur Sturgis Hardy and was called to the bar in 1890. He set up practice in Windsor. Cowan married Clara L. Pilkey in 1892. In 1902, he was named King's Counsel. Cowan served as solicitor for the Grand Trunk Railway from 1904 to 1910. He died in Toronto at the age of 54.

Cowan was one of the lawyers who defended Anderson Veney in 1893; the defence argued unsuccessfully that Veney was not guilty by reason of insanity.
