= Lewis Wigle =

Canadian politician

Member of Parliament for Essex South
- In office 1882–1887
- Preceded by: New riding
- Succeeded by: James Brien

Ontario MPP
- In office 1875–1882
- Preceded by: New riding
- Succeeded by: William Balfour
- Constituency: Essex South

Personal details
- Born: March 10, 1845 Gosfield Township, Canada West
- Died: July 30, 1934 (aged 89)
- Party: Conservative, 1875-1882
- Other political affiliations: Conservative, 1882-1887
- Spouse: Bertha Smith
- Occupation: Businessman

Lewis Wigle (March 10, 1845 – July 30, 1934) was an Ontario farmer, businessman and political figure. He represented Essex South in the Legislative Assembly of Ontario from 1875 to 1882 and in the House of Commons of Canada from 1882 to 1887 as a Conservative member.

He was born in Gosfield Township, Essex County, Canada West in 1845, the son of Solomon Wigle. He owned a general store at Leamington and served as reeve of Mersea from 1867 to 1875. Wigle married Rebecca Hairaine in 1868. He was president of the Leamington and St. Clair Railway and a tobacco buyer for the Empire Tobacco Company. After the death of his first wife in 1898, Wigle married Bertha Smith, the widow of a Doctor Wray. After 1887, he ran unsuccessfully four times for the Essex South seat in the House of Commons and in the 1919 provincial election as an independent Conservative. Wigle served as mayor of Leamington from 1902 to 1904.

His daughter Edith married Seger McKay, mayor of Kingsville.

== Electoral history ==
1875 Ontario general election: Essex South
Party	Candidate	Votes	%
Conservative	Lewis Wigle	1,014	51.19
Liberal	J.C. Iler	967	48.81
Turnout		1,981	69.61
Eligible voters		2,846	
Election voided
Source: Elections Ontario

Ontario provincial by-election, September 1875: Essex South Previous election voided
Party	Candidate	Votes	%
Conservative	Lewis Wigle	1,310	58.53
Liberal	J.C. Iler	928	41.47
Total valid votes		2,238	
Conservative pickup new district.			
Source: History of the Electoral Districts, Legislatures and Ministries of the Province of Ontario

1879 Ontario general election: Essex South
Party	Candidate	Votes	%	±%
Conservative	Lewis Wigle	1,418	52.93	−5.60
Liberal	William Balfour	1,261	47.07	+5.60
Total valid votes		2,679	74.29	
Eligible voters		3,606		
Conservative hold		Swing		−5.60
Source: Elections Ontario
