= Albert Prince =

Canadian politician

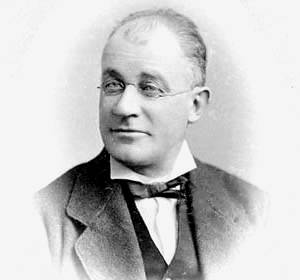

Ontario MPP
- In office 1871–1874
- Preceded by: Solomon Wigle
- Succeeded by: Riding abolished
- Constituency: Essex

Personal details
- Born: November 17, 1825 Cheltenham, Gloucestershire, England
- Died: July 18, 1875 (aged 49) Essex County, Ontario
- Party: Liberal
- Occupation: Lawyer

Albert Prince (November 17, 1825 – July 18, 1875) was an Ontario lawyer and political figure. He represented Essex in the Legislative Assembly of Ontario as a Liberal member from 1871 to 1874.

He was born in Cheltenham, Gloucestershire, England in 1825, the son of John Prince, and came to Sandwich (later Windsor) in Upper Canada with his family in 1833. He practised law at Sandwich. He died in Essex County in 1875 of apoplexy.

== Electoral history ==
1871 Ontario general election: Essex
Party	Candidate	Votes	%	±%
Liberal	Albert Prince	1,204	51.23	+4.92
Conservative	Solomon Wigle	786	33.45	−20.24
Independent	Mr. Rankin	360	15.32	
Turnout		2,350	50.95	−24.46
Eligible voters		4,612		
Liberal gain from Conservative		Swing		+12.58
Source: Elections Ontario
