= Delos Davis =

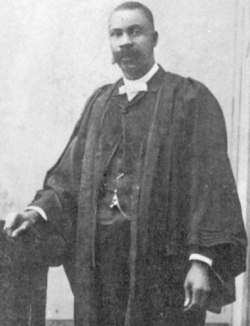
- Born: August 4, 1846; Maryland
- Died: April 13, 1915 (aged 68); Near Amherstburg
- Occupation: Lawyer
- Years active: 1873–1911
- Spouse(s): Nancy Jane Mitchell (married 1868–1893), Mary Jane Banks (married 1907)

Delos Rogest Davis, KC (August 4, 1846–13 April 1915) was the third black lawyer in Canada and the first black King's Counsel.

Davis is widely and erroneously considered to be the first Black lawyer in Canada, but Robert Sutherland (who was called to the bar in 1855 and died in 1878) was already dead before Davis was called to the bar of the Law Society of Upper Canada, and Abraham Walker was called to the New Brunswick bar in 1882.

Davis was born in Maryland in 1846 and grew up in the Colchester Township, Canada West area. He was the son of James Davis, a former slave from Virginia who came to Colchester Township, Canada West via the Underground Railroad in 1850.

Delos started by teaching in school and then began to study law with Gordon Watts Leggatt and Charles Robert Horne of Windsor due to his dream of being a lawyer. In 1868, Davis married Nancy Jane Mitchell. He qualified to practice as a notary public in 1873. Since he was not able to find a law office that was willing to let him article with them, in 1884, William Douglas Balfour introduced a special act allowing Davis to practice as a solicitor if he passed the required Law Society of Upper Canada test. A second special act allowed Davis to become a barrister and he was called to the bar on November 15, 1886.

On November 10, 1910, the Ontario Government appointed him a King's Counsel, "the first Black so appointed in the United Kingdom of Great Britain and Ireland and the British Dominions".

He set up practice in Amherstburg in 1887. From 1900 to 1905, he practiced with his son Frederick Homer Alphonso, who had graduated from Osgoode Hall. In 1907, he married Mary Jane Banks; his first wife had died in 1893 during childbirth. Davis was named King's Counsel in 1910, the year after he retired from practice. He died at home near Amherstburg on 13 April 1915.
