= Eccles James Gott =

Canadian politician

Member of Parliament for Essex South
- In office October 1925 – October 1935
- Preceded by: George Perry Graham
- Succeeded by: Murray Clark

Personal details
- Born: Eccles James Gott; 4 September 1884 Amherstburg, Ontario
- Died: 15 June 1939 (aged 54)
- Party: Conservative
- Profession: real estate broker

Eccles James Gott (4 September 1884 – 15 June 1939) was a Conservative member of the House of Commons of Canada. He was born in Amherstburg, Ontario and became a real estate broker.

Gott attended schools at Amherstburg and Gesto, then secondary school at Essex Centre, Ontario.

He was first elected to Parliament at the Essex South riding in the 1925 general election then re-elected there in 1926 and 1930. Gott was defeated in the 1935 election by Murray Clark of the Liberal party.
