= Amherstburg Echo =

- Type: Weekly newspaper
- Format: Tabloid
- Owner: Quebecor Inc./Sun Media
- Editor: Ron Giofu
- Founded: 1874
- Ceased publication: 2012
- Language: English
- Headquarters: 238 Dalhousie St., Amherstburg, Ontario, N9V 1W4
- Website: amherstburgecho.com

The Amherstburg Echo was a newspaper which served Amherstburg, Ontario, from 1874 to 2012.

== History ==
The Amherstburg Echo was founded in November 1874 by William D. Balfour and John A. Auld. The first home of the Amherstburg Echo was in a building on the west side of Ramsay Street. Balfour was elected Speaker of the Legislature in 1894 and Provincial Secretary two years later. He died on August 19, 1896, just two weeks after assuming his duties there. Shortly thereafter, Arthur Marsh of the Essex Free Press joined the Amherstburg Echo as John Auld's partner. Thus began the involvement of the Marsh family, which lasted for 85 years. As the paper grew in size and stature, a more modern facility was required. Shortly after arriving here Arthur married Bessie Hicks and they raised a son and a daughter, John and Helen. Arthur served as co-editor of the paper and served as president of the Canadian Weekly Newspaper Association.

Prominent architect J.C. Pennington was hired to draw up plans and in 1915 the Echo moved into its new building on the west side of Dalhousie Street. Arthur Marsh's 23-year-old son John, a recent graduate of McGill University, joined his father at the paper after Auld's death in 1924. The Marshes were the recipient of many awards for excellence throughout the years proved its stature, as did letters of admiration from other weeklies.

When Arthur Marsh was fatally injured in an automobile accident in 1940, his daughter Helen left her teaching career at Amherstburg Public School behind and joined her brother John Marsh at the paper, John taking over as editor. John's column, "With the Tide", commented on his passions for historical conservation, including Fort Malden's restoration. Helen advocated for women's rights in the weekly, including her widely read “Conversation Pieces” column which is significant as a social history of Amherstburg from 1940 to 1980.

In 1981 John, then 80 years old, sold The Amherstburg Echo to John and Linda James. Both John and Helen continued to write a column for a few years after the sale before settling into retirement. John and Helen Marsh helped found the Marsh Collection Society, a local history centre where many have come and continue to come to research the history of the area.

James owned the Echo until the early 1990s when he sold the Echo and its historic location at 238 Dalhousie St. to Bowes Publishers Limited, which eventually became part of Sun Media. In October 2012, the Echo was closed by Sun Media, who announced it would increase Amherstburg coverage in its recently launched Windsor This Week paper. In December 2012, Sun Media closed Windsor This Week.

== See also ==
- List of newspapers in Canada
