= Abbateggio =

- Comune
- Comune di Abbateggio
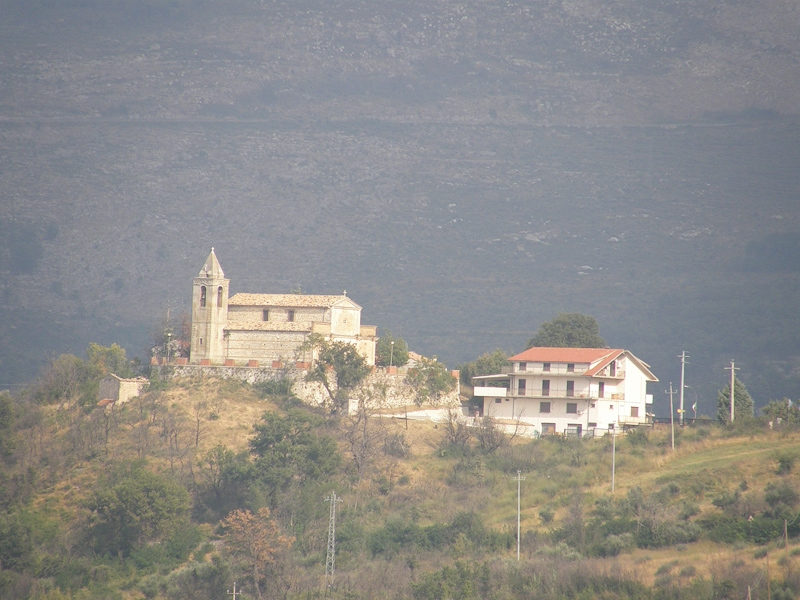
- View of Abbateggio

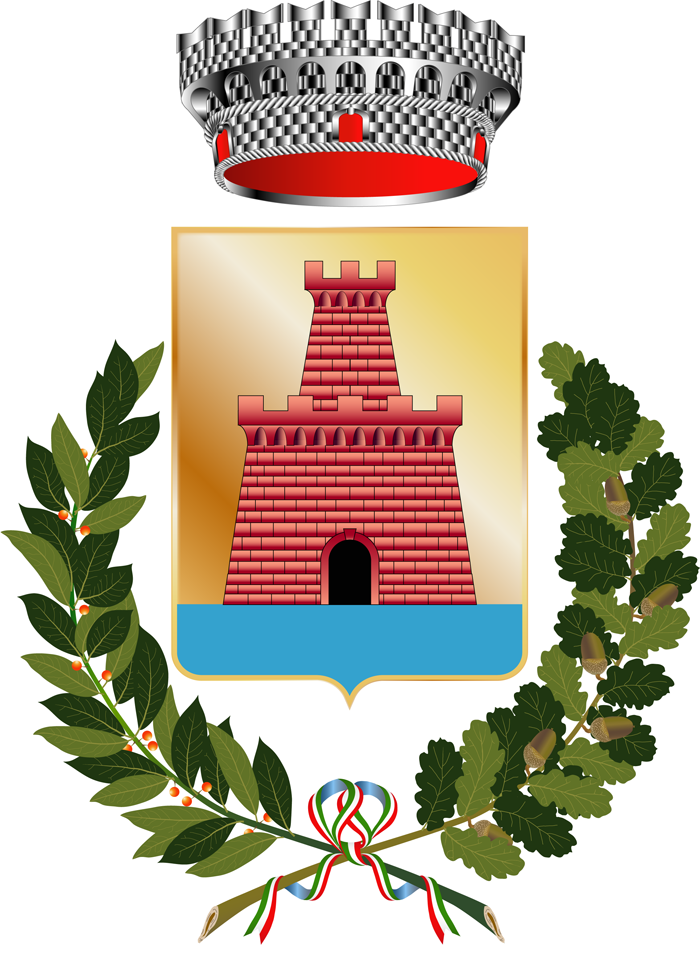
- Coat of arms

- Location within Italy Location within Abruzzo
- Coordinates: 42°14′N 14°1′E
- Country: Italy
- Region: Abruzzo
- Province: Pescara (PE)
- Frazioni: Catalano, Cusano, Di Mezzo, Le Piane, San Martino, Scalelle

Government
  - Mayor: Gabriele Di Pierdomenico (Uniti per Abbateggio)

Area
  - Total: 15.4 km^{2} (5.9 sq mi)
- Elevation: 530 m (1,740 ft)

Population (1 January 2026)
  - Total: 345
  - Density: 22.4/km^{2} (58.0/sq mi)
- Demonym: Abbateggiani
- Time zone: UTC+1 (CET)
  - Summer (DST): UTC+2 (CEST)
- Postal code: 65020
- Dialing code: 085
- Patron saint: Saint Lawrence
- Saint day: 10 August
- Website: Official website

Abbateggio is a comune and town in the province of Pescara in the Abruzzo region of Italy.

== History ==
The first documents about the village's existence date back to the 10th century, which suggest the area became populated around 871 AD.

In 1929, under the prime ministership of Benito Mussolini, the village was amalgamated with Roccamorice under the jurisdiction of San Valentino. It became a separate municipality once again in 1947, under the mayoralty of Gino Di Benedetto.

== Economy ==
The economy of Abbateggio is based on mixed agriculture. Livestock are kept, and crops including grain (particularly farro), olives, vines and fruit trees are grown. Cheese and honey are also produced.

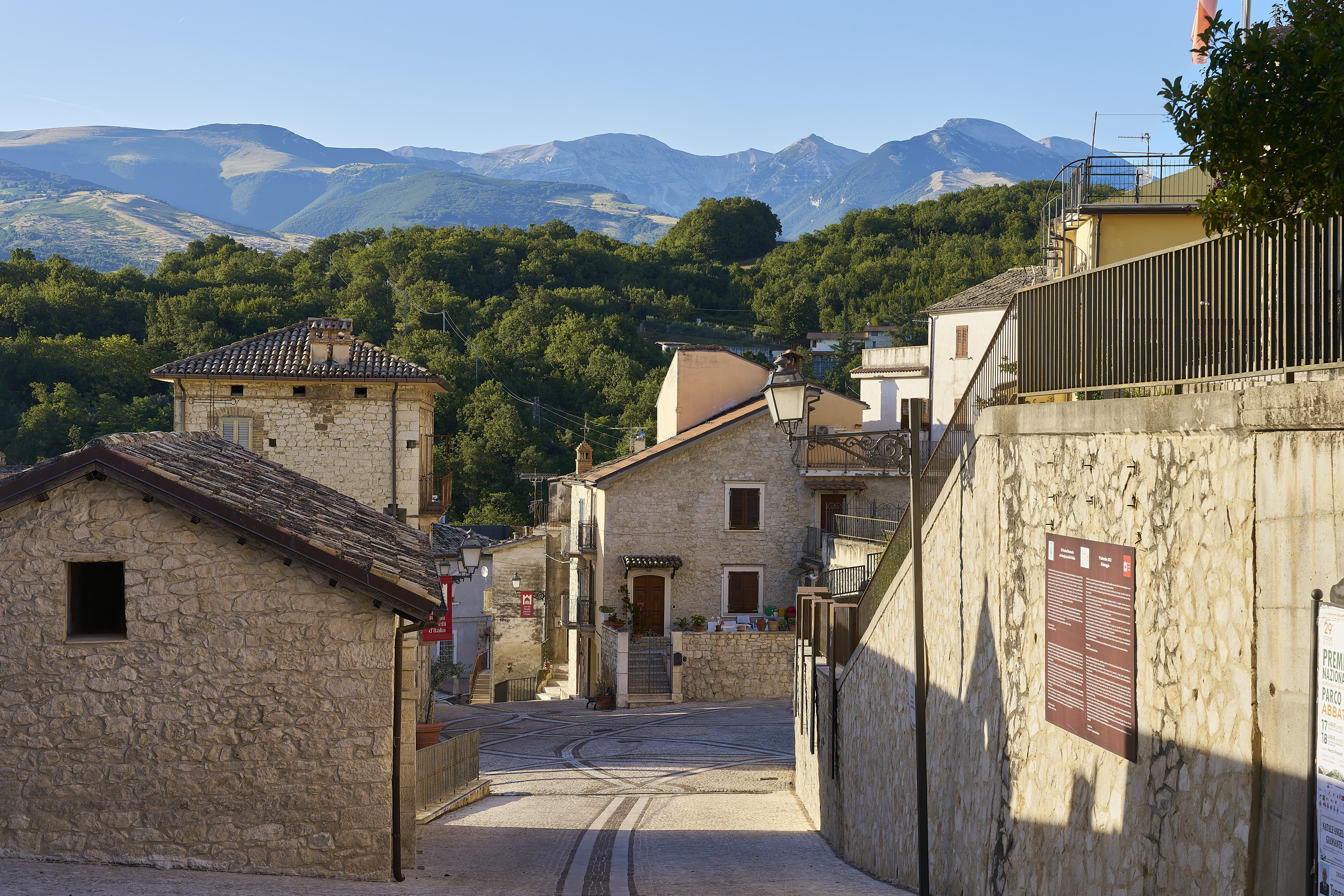
Via Angelo de Thomasis with view of the Maiella massif

== Tourism and culture ==
The Cusano district of the comune is home to the ruins of an ancient castle and other early medieval buildings.

Abbateggio has been named one of I Borghi più belli d'Italia ("The most beautiful villages of Italy").

Festivals in the town include:

- San Lorenzo (10 August) - Grain feast
- 7–9 September - Patron festival
- Last Sunday in July - Majella Park Literary Award.

== Notable people ==
Angelo Tomasso Sr, founder of the Tomasso Group, grew up in Abbateggio and immigrated to the United States of America in 1910.

Remo Mancini, Canadian former politician, was born in Abbateggio.

Honorary citizens include Grazia Francescato, politician and environmental activist; writer Dacia Maraini; and Luciano D'Alfonso, president of Abruzzo and former mayor of Pescara.
