= Charles George Fletcher =

Canadian politician

Ontario MPP
- In office 1937–1943
- Preceded by: Lambert Peter Wigle
- Succeeded by: William Murdoch
- In office 1926–1929
- Preceded by: Adolphus T. Armstrong
- Succeeded by: Austin Burton Smith
- Constituency: Essex South

Personal details
- Born: December 31, 1890 Tilbury East Township, Kent, Ontario
- Died: July 28, 1959 (aged 68) Chatham-Kent, Ontario
- Party: Liberal
- Occupation: Lawyer

Military service
- Allegiance: Canadian
- Branch/service: Canadian Army
- Years of service: 1914-1918
- Unit: Princess Patricia's Canadian Light Infantry

Charles George Fletcher (December 31, 1890 – July 28, 1959) was a lawyer and political figure in Ontario. He represented Essex South in the Legislative Assembly of Ontario from 1926 to 1929 and from 1937 to 1943 as a Liberal member.

He was born in Tilbury East Township, Kent, Ontario, the son of David Fletcher and Catherine Logie, both Scottish immigrants. He was educated at the University of Toronto and Osgoode Hall and later moved to Leamington. Fletcher served in France with Princess Patricia's Canadian Light Infantry during World War I. He was defeated when he ran for reelection to the Ontario assembly in 1929 but was later reelected in 1937. Fletcher served as sheriff for Essex County for a number of years. He died in Chatham-Kent, Ontario at the age of 68.
