= Adolphus T. Armstrong =

Canadian politician from Ontario

Member of the Ontario Provincial Parliament for Essex South
- In office June 25, 1923 – October 18, 1926
- Preceded by: Milton C. Fox
- Succeeded by: Charles George Fletcher

Personal details
- Party: Progressive Conservative

Adolphus T. Armstrong was a Canadian politician from the Progressive Conservative Party of Ontario. He represented Essex South in the Legislative Assembly of Ontario from 1923 to 1926.

== See also ==
- 16th Parliament of Ontario
