= Donald Paterson (politician) =

Canadian politician

Ontario MPP
- In office 1963–1975
- Preceded by: William Murdoch
- Succeeded by: Remo Mancini
- Constituency: Essex South

Personal details
- Born: November 25, 1926; Leamington, Ontario
- Died: January 11, 1999 (aged 72); Leamington, Ontario
- Political party: Liberal
- Spouse: Joyce Oke
- Profession: Store owner

Donald Alexander Paterson (November 25, 1926 – January 11, 1999) was a politician in Ontario, Canada. He was a Liberal member of the Legislative Assembly of Ontario from 1963 to 1975 who represented the southwestern riding of Essex South.

== Background ==
Paterson was a lifelong resident of Leamington, Ontario. On March 8, 1949, he married Joyce Oke. Together they raised four children. He owned and managed Paterson's Dry Goods in the town of Leamington. Paterson died in 1999 and is buried in Erie Memorial Gardens, Leamington, Essex Co., Ontario.

== Politics ==
Paterson ran in the 1963 provincial election as the Liberal candidate. He defeated Progressive Conservative incumbent William Murdoch by 715 votes. and was subsequently re-elected in the general elections in 1967 and 1971, winning by large margins. In 1967, his plurality over the PC candidate, Thomas Robson, was over 5,000 votes. He served in the opposition benches under leaders Andy Thompson and Robert Nixon. He retired from politics in 1975.
