= Henry William Allan (politician) =

Canadian politician

Member of the Canadian Parliament for Essex South
- In office 1891–1896
- Preceded by: James Brien
- Succeeded by: Mahlon K. Cowan

Personal details
- Born: 29 December 1843 Niagara, Canada West
- Died: 10 March 1913 (aged 69)
- Party: Liberal

Henry William Allan (29 December 1843 – 10 March 1913) was a Canadian politician, merchant and produce dealer. He was elected in 1891 as a Member of the House of Commons of Canada for the riding of Essex South, Ontario representing the Liberal Party. He was defeated in the 1878 election when he ran in the riding of Norfolk South. Prior to his federal political experience, he was elected as a councillor in Norfolk County, Ontario and as reeve in Walsingham, Ontario.
