= Alfred Henry Clarke =

Canadian politician

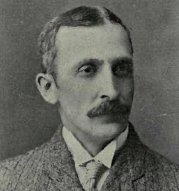

Member of the Canadian Parliament for Essex South
- In office 1904–1917
- Preceded by: Mahlon K. Cowan
- Succeeded by: John Wesley Brien

Personal details
- Born: October 25, 1860 Manilla, Canada West
- Died: January 30, 1942 (aged 81)
- Party: Liberal
- Committees: Chair, Standing Committee on Public Accounts

Alfred Henry Clarke (October 25, 1860 – January 30, 1942) was a Canadian politician.

Born in Manilla, Canada West, Clarke was educated at the Public School of Manilla and the Oakwood High School. In addition to studying law at the University of Toronto, he was also a Bencher of the Law Society of Upper Canada, a County Crown Attorney, and a Clerk of the Peace and Local Master in Chancery in Essex. Clarke was first elected to the House of Commons of Canada for the electoral district of Essex South in the general elections of 1904. Standing as a Liberal, he was re-elected in 1908 and 1911.

He became a judge of the Supreme Court of Alberta Appellate Division in 1921 until 1942.
