= Bruce Crozier =

Canadian politician from Ontario (1938–2011)

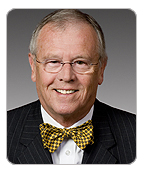

Ontario MPP
- In office 1999–2011
- Preceded by: Riding established
- Succeeded by: Taras Natyshak
- Constituency: Essex
- In office 1993–1999
- Preceded by: Remo Mancini
- Succeeded by: Riding abolished
- Constituency: Essex South

Personal details
- Born: June 26, 1938 Leamington, Ontario
- Died: June 3, 2011 (aged 72) Windsor, Ontario, Canada
- Party: Liberal
- Occupation: Certified General Accountant

Bruce Crozier (June 26, 1938 – June 3, 2011) was a politician in Ontario, Canada. He was a member of the Legislative Assembly of Ontario, representing the ridings of Essex South and Essex for the Ontario Liberal Party.

== Background ==
Crozier was a Certified General Accountant and member of the Certified General Accountants of Ontario. He worked for the H.J. Heinz Company for eleven years and was the Vice-President of Finance and Secretary-Treasurer for Bennie Lumber and Building Materials Ltd. He was also the National Director of the Kinsmen Club from 1975 to 1976, and was a life member of the Leamington Kinsman Club.

== Politics ==
He was elected to the Leamington city council in 1985, and later served as the town's Mayor from 1988 to 1993. He was first elected to the Ontario legislature in a by-election in on December 2, 1993 in the riding of Essex South, held after longtime Liberal Member of Provincial Parliament (MPP) Remo Mancini announced his resignation from the legislature. He won this election very easily, defeating his nearest opponent (Progressive Conservative candidate Joan Flood) by almost 10,000 votes, amid fewer than 20,000 cast.

Crozier was re-elected in the 1995 provincial election, defeating his nearest opponent by almost 9,000 votes. The Progressive Conservatives won the election, and Crozier joined 29 other Liberals in the official opposition. He supported Dwight Duncan for the party leadership in 1996, and gave his support to Dalton McGuinty after Duncan was eliminated.

Crozier was re-elected in the 1999 election by over 10,000 votes in the redistributed riding of Essex, though again the Progressive Conservatives formed government at the provincial level.

His margin of victory was reduced in the 2003 provincial election, which the Liberals won in a landslide. He faced a strong challenge from New Democrat Pat Hayes, who supplanted the Tories for a second-place finish. He was not appointed to Cabinet, but was named as the Legislature's Deputy Speaker on December 8, 2003. In December 2007, Crozier was made chair of the Committee of the Whole House, a senior parliamentary role responsible for maintaining order during house sessions.

Crozier announced on November 29, 2010, that he would not be a candidate in the 2011 election.

On June 4, 2011, Premier Dalton McGuinty announced that Crozier had died the previous evening of an abdominal aortic aneurysm at a hospital in Windsor, Ontario.

== Election results ==
2007 Ontario general election
Party	Candidate	Votes	%	±%
Liberal	Bruce Crozier	19,969	48.02	
Progressive Conservative	Richard Kniaziew	10,400	25.01	
New Democratic	John Grima	8,638	20.77	
Green	Jessica Fracassi	2,220	5.34	
Libertarian	Aaron Parent	358	0.86	

2003 Ontario general election
Party	Candidate	Votes	%	±%
Liberal	Bruce Crozier	20,559	45.28	-11.45
New Democratic	Pat Hayes	12,614	27.78	+19.43
Progressive Conservative	Patrick O'Neil	11,234	24.74	-9.49
Green	Darren J. Brown	998	2.2	

1999 Ontario general election
Party	Candidate	Votes	%
Liberal	Bruce Crozier	25,446	56.73
Progressive Conservative	Pat O'Neil	15,354	34.23
New Democratic	Merv Richards	3745	8.35
Independent	Enver Villamizar	307	0.68

1995 Ontario general election
Party	Candidate	Votes	%
Liberal	Bruce Crozier	14,513	
Progressive Conservative	Dave Wylupek	5,730	
New Democratic	Dave Maris	4,348	
Family Coalition	Enver Villamizar	1,550	
Independent	David Mitchell	498	

Ontario provincial by-election, December 2, 1993: Essex South
Party	Candidate	Votes
Liberal	Bruce Crozier	12,736
Progressive Conservative	Joan Flood	3,295
New Democratic	David Maris	1,100
Family Coalition	Joyce Ann Cherryr	1,060
Green	Michael Green	132
Independent	John Turmel	84
