= Essex South (provincial electoral district) =

Ontario electoral district

Defunct provincial electoral district
- Legislature: Legislative Assembly of Ontario
- District created: 1875
- District abolished: 1996
- First contested: 1875
- Last contested: 1995

Essex South was an electoral riding in Ontario, Canada. It was created in 1875 when the riding of Essex was split into Essex North and Essex South. It was abolished in 1996 before the 1999 election.

== Members of Provincial Parliament ==
Essex South
Assembly	Years	Member	Party
Riding created from Essex in 1875
3rd	1875–1879	Lewis Wigle	Conservative
4th	1879–1882	Lewis Wigle	Conservative
4th	1882–1883	William Balfour	Liberal
5th	1883–1886	William Balfour	Liberal
6th	1886–1890	William Balfour	Liberal
7th	1890–1894	William Balfour	Liberal
8th	1894–1896	William Balfour	Liberal
8th	1896–1898	John Allan Auld	Liberal
9th	1898–1902	John Allan Auld	Liberal
10th	1902–1905	John Allan Auld	Liberal
11th	1905–1908	John Allan Auld	Liberal
12th	1908–1911	Charles Anderson	Conservative
13th	1911–1914	Charles Anderson	Conservative
14th	1914–1919	Lambert Peter Wigle	Liberal
15th	1919–1923	Milton C. Fox	United Farmers
16th	1923–1926	Adolphus T. Armstrong	Conservative
17th	1926–1929	Charles George Fletcher	Liberal
18th	1929–1934	Austin Burton Smith	Conservative
19th	1934–1937	Lambert Peter Wigle	Liberal
20th	1937–1943	Charles George Fletcher	Liberal
21st	1943–1945	William Murdoch	Progressive Conservative
22nd	1945–1948	William Murdoch	Progressive Conservative
23rd	1948–1951	William Murdoch	Progressive Conservative
24th	1951–1955	William Murdoch	Progressive Conservative
25th	1955–1959	William Murdoch	Progressive Conservative
26th	1959–1963	William Murdoch	Progressive Conservative
27th	1963–1967	Donald Paterson	Liberal
28th	1967–1971	Donald Paterson	Liberal
29th	1971–1975	Donald Paterson	Liberal
30th	1975–1977	Remo Mancini	Liberal
31st	1977–1981	Remo Mancini	Liberal
32nd	1981–1985	Remo Mancini	Liberal
33rd	1985–1987	Remo Mancini	Liberal
34th	1987–1990	Remo Mancini	Liberal
35th	1990–1993	Remo Mancini	Liberal
35th	1993–1995	Bruce Crozier	Liberal
36th	1995–1999	Bruce Crozier	Liberal
Sourced from the Ontario Legislative Assembly
Merged into Essex riding before the 1999 election

== Election results ==
1995 Ontario general election
Party	Candidate	Votes	%	±%
Liberal	Bruce Crozier	14,513	54.48	–14.71
Progressive Conservative	Dave J. Wylupek	5,730	21.51	+3.61
New Democratic	Dave Maris	4,348	16.32	+10.35
Family Coalition	Joyce Cherry	1,550	5.82	+0.06
Natural Law	David W. Mitchell	498	1.87	–
Total valid votes		26,639	98.56	
Total rejected, unmarked and declined ballots		388	1.44	+0.80
Turnout		27,027	50.91	+13.73
Eligible voters		53,088		
Liberal hold		Swing		–9.16
Source: Elections Ontario

Ontario provincial by-election, December 2, 1993 Resignation of Remo Mancini
Party	Candidate	Votes	%	±%
Liberal	Bruce Crozier	12,736	69.19	+33.17
Progressive Conservative	Joan Marie Flood	3,295	17.90	–3.68
New Democratic	David William Maris	1,100	5.98	–29.32
Family Coalition	Joyce Anne Cherry	1,060	5.76	–1.34
Green	Michael Green	132	0.72	–
Independent	John Turmel	84	0.46	–
Total valid votes		18,407	99.36	
Total rejected, unmarked and declined ballots		118	0.64	–0.32
Turnout		18,525	37.18	–22.22
Eligible voters		49,824		
Liberal hold		Swing		+18.42
Source: Elections Ontario

1990 Ontario general election
Party	Candidate	Votes	%	±%
Liberal	Remo Mancini	10,575	36.02	–22.92
New Democratic	Donna Tremblay	10,363	35.30	+7.11
Progressive Conservative	Joan M. Flood	6,335	21.58	+8.71
Family Coalition	Steve Posthumus	2,085	7.10	–
Total valid votes		29,358	99.04	
Total rejected, unmarked and declined ballots		285	0.96	+0.44
Turnout		29,643	59.40	+4.29
Eligible voters		49,905		
Liberal hold		Swing		–15.02
Source: Elections Ontario

1987 Ontario general election
Party	Candidate	Votes	%	±%
Liberal	Remo Mancini	15,292	58.94	+11.72
New Democratic	Marv Ewing	7,312	28.18	+17.08
Progressive Conservative	Scott Cowan	3,339	12.87	–8.28
Total valid votes		25,943	99.48	
Total rejected ballots		136	0.52	–0.10
Turnout		26,079	55.11	–5.90
Eligible voters		47,323		
Liberal hold		Swing		–2.68
Source: Elections Ontario

1985 Ontario general election
Party	Candidate	Votes	%	±%
Liberal	Remo Mancini	11,382	47.22	–5.55
Progressive Conservative	Paul Setterington	5,098	21.15	–4.13
Independent	Jeff J. Totten	4,947	20.52	–
New Democratic	Paul Hertel	2,677	11.11	–10.85
Total valid votes		24,104	99.38	
Total rejected ballots		150	0.62	+0.11
Turnout		24,254	61.01	+9.87
Eligible voters		39,756		
Liberal hold		Swing		–0.71
Source: Elections Ontario

1981 Ontario general election
Party	Candidate	Votes	%	±%
Liberal	Remo Mancini	10,454	52.77	+7.08
Progressive Conservative	Wayne Patterson	5,008	25.28	–7.28
New Democratic	Blake Sanford	4,349	21.95	+0.20
Total valid votes		19,811	99.49	
Total rejected ballots		102	0.51	+0.01
Turnout		19,913	51.14	–17.25
Eligible voters		38,941		
Liberal hold		Swing		+7.18
Source: Elections Ontario

1977 Ontario general election
Party	Candidate	Votes	%	±%
Liberal	Remo Mancini	11,215	45.69	+4.35
Progressive Conservative	Frank Klees	7,991	32.56	+0.43
New Democratic	Dan Lauzon	5,340	21.76	–4.78
Total valid votes		24,546	99.50	
Total rejected ballots		123	0.50	+0.01
Turnout		24,669	68.39	+1.47
Eligible voters		36,073		
Liberal hold		Swing		+1.96
Source: Elections Ontario

1975 Ontario general election
Party	Candidate	Votes	%	±%
Liberal	Remo Mancini	9,517	41.34	–10.40
Progressive Conservative	Frank Klees	7,395	32.12	+11.49
New Democratic	Ralph N. Wensley	6,108	26.53	–1.09
Total valid votes		23,020	99.51	
Total rejected ballots		113	0.49	–0.05
Turnout		23,133	66.92	–7.85
Eligible voters		34,568		
Liberal hold		Swing		–10.95
Source: Elections Ontario

1971 Ontario general election
Party	Candidate	Votes	%	±%
Liberal	Donald Paterson	12,217	51.75	–8.11
New Democratic	Ralph N. Wensley	6,521	27.62	+18.45
Progressive Conservative	D. Bruce Suitor	4,872	20.64	–10.34
Total valid votes		23,610	99.46	
Total rejected ballots		128	0.54	–0.07
Turnout		23,738	74.77	+8.60
Eligible voters		31,749		
Liberal hold		Swing		–13.28
Source: Elections Ontario

1967 Ontario general election
Party	Candidate	Votes	%	±%
Liberal	Donald Paterson	10,476	59.85	+10.00
Progressive Conservative	Tom Robson	5,422	30.98	–15.15
New Democratic	Pierre Blais	1,605	9.17	+5.14
Total valid votes		17,503	99.39	
Total rejected ballots		107	0.61	–0.14
Turnout		17,610	66.16	–7.13
Eligible voters		26,616		
Liberal hold		Swing		+12.58
Source: Elections Ontario

1963 Ontario general election
Party	Candidate	Votes	%	±%
Liberal	Donald Paterson	9,572	49.85	+5.15
Progressive Conservative	William Murdoch	8,857	46.13	–4.66
New Democratic	Donald E. Bertrand	773	4.03	–0.49
Total valid votes		19,202	99.26	
Total rejected ballots		144	0.74	–0.68
Turnout		19,346	73.30	+7.95
Eligible voters		26,394		
Liberal gain from Progressive Conservative		Swing		+4.90
Source: Elections Ontario

1959 Ontario general election
Party	Candidate	Votes	%	±%
Progressive Conservative	William Murdoch	8,356	50.78	–5.93
Liberal	Eugene Whelan	7,355	44.70	+1.41
Co-operative Commonwealth	Clarence Williams	743	4.52	–
Total valid votes		16,454	98.58	
Total rejected ballots		237	1.42	+0.36
Turnout		16,691	65.35	+4.90
Eligible voters		25,542		
Progressive Conservative hold		Swing		–3.67
Source: Elections Ontario

1955 Ontario general election
Party	Candidate	Votes	%	±%
Progressive Conservative	William Murdoch	8,080	56.71	–7.79
Liberal	Eadie W. Watson	6,168	43.29	+13.46
Total valid votes		14,248	98.94	
Total rejected ballots		153	1.06	+0.15
Turnout		14,401	60.45	–5.95
Eligible voters		23,824		
Progressive Conservative hold		Swing		–10.63
Source: Elections Ontario

1951 Ontario general election
Party	Candidate	Votes	%	±%
Progressive Conservative	William Murdoch	9,797	64.50	+9.04
Liberal	Earl Pulleyblank	4,531	29.83	–8.64
Co-operative Commonwealth	Harley Bennett	861	5.67	–0.40
Total valid votes		15,189	99.09	
Total rejected ballots		140	0.91	+0.10
Turnout		15,329	66.39	+0.10
Eligible voters		23,088		
Progressive Conservative hold		Swing		+8.84
Source: Elections Ontario

1948 Ontario general election
Party	Candidate	Votes	%	±%
Progressive Conservative	William Murdoch	8,354	55.46	+3.47
Liberal	E. J. Atkin	5,795	38.47	–1.18
Co-operative Commonwealth	Bernard M. Whelan	914	6.07	–2.30
Total valid votes		15,063	99.19	
Total rejected ballots		123	0.81	–0.11
Turnout		15,186	66.29	–7.33
Eligible voters		22,908		
Progressive Conservative hold		Swing		+2.32
Source: Elections Ontario

1945 Ontario general election
Party	Candidate	Votes	%	±%
Progressive Conservative	William Murdoch	7,688	51.99	+10.48
Liberal	Morgan Brown	5,863	39.65	–0.48
Co-operative Commonwealth	R. M. Crouch	1,237	8.36	–10.00
Total valid votes		14,788	99.08	
Total rejected ballots		138	0.92	+0.17
Turnout		14,926	73.62	+24.78
Eligible voters		20,274		
Progressive Conservative hold		Swing		+5.48
Source: Elections Ontario

1943 Ontario general election
Party	Candidate	Votes	%	±%
Progressive Conservative	William Murdoch	3,940	41.51	+5.03
Liberal	Charles George Fletcher	3,808	40.12	–23.39
Co-operative Commonwealth	R. M. Crouch	1,743	18.36	–
Total valid votes		9,491	99.25	
Total rejected ballots		72	0.75	–0.15
Turnout		9,563	48.85	–16.10
Eligible voters		19,578		
Progressive Conservative gain from Liberal		Swing		+14.21
Source: Elections Ontario

1937 Ontario general election
Party	Candidate	Votes	%	±%
Liberal	Charles George Fletcher	7,755	63.51	+7.95
Conservative	James Armstrong	4,455	36.49	–7.95
Total valid votes		12,210	99.10	
Total rejected ballots		111	0.90	+0.21
Turnout		12,321	64.95	–1.74
Eligible voters		18,971		
Liberal hold		Swing		+7.95
Source: Elections Ontario

1934 Ontario general election
Party	Candidate	Votes	%	±%
Liberal	Lambert Peter Wigle	7,110	55.56	+8.65
Conservative	Austin Burton Smith	5,687	44.44	–8.65
Total valid votes		12,797	99.31	
Total rejected ballots		89	0.69	+0.19
Turnout		12,886	66.68	+0.84
Eligible voters		19,324		
Liberal gain from Conservative		Swing		+8.65
Source: Elections Ontario

1929 Ontario general election
Party	Candidate	Votes	%	±%
Conservative	Austin Burton Smith	4,548	53.09	+4.28
Liberal	Charles George Fletcher	4,019	46.91	–4.28
Total valid votes		8,567	99.50	
Total rejected ballots		43	0.50	+0.17
Turnout		8,610	65.84	+0.50
Eligible voters		13,077		
Conservative gain from Liberal		Swing		+4.28
Source: Elections Ontario

1926 Ontario general election
Party	Candidate	Votes	%	±%
Liberal	Charles George Fletcher	4,560	51.20	+21.26
Conservative	Adolphus T. Armstrong	4,347	48.80	+13.37
Total valid votes		8,907	99.68	
Total rejected ballots		29	0.32	–0.10
Turnout		8,936	65.34	+8.26
Eligible voters		13,676		
Liberal gain from Conservative		Swing		+17.31
Source: Elections Ontario

1923 Ontario general election
Party	Candidate	Votes	%	±%
Conservative	Adolphus T. Armstrong	2,652	35.43	–
United Farmers	John Orville Duke	2,592	34.63	–6.67
Liberal	William Burton Clifford	2,241	29.94	–9.85
Total valid votes		7,485	99.57	
Total rejected ballots		32	0.43	–3.09
Turnout		7,517	57.08	–21.21
Eligible voters		13,169		
Conservative gain from United Farmers		Swing		–
Source: Elections Ontario

1919 Ontario general election
Party	Candidate	Votes	%	±%
United Farmers	Milton C. Fox	3,558	41.30	–
Liberal	Lambert Peter Wigle	3,428	39.79	–10.59
Independent	Lewis Wigle	1,629	18.91	–
Total valid votes		8,615	96.48	
Total rejected ballots		314	3.52	+3.11
Turnout		8,929	78.29	–9.94
Eligible voters		11,405		
United Farmers gain from Liberal		Swing		+5.29
Source: Elections Ontario

1914 Ontario general election
Party	Candidate	Votes	%	±%
Liberal	Lambert Peter Wigle	2,196	50.38	+1.63
Conservative	Charles Anderson	2,163	49.62	–1.63
Total valid votes		4,359	99.59	
Total rejected ballots		18	0.41	+0.05
Turnout		4,377	88.23	+13.30
Eligible voters		4,961		
Liberal gain from Conservative		Swing		+1.63
Source: Elections Ontario

1911 Ontario general election
Party	Candidate	Votes	%	±%
Conservative	Charles Anderson	2,665	51.25	+0.49
Liberal	Richard Ruddy Brett	2,535	48.75	–0.49
Total valid votes		5,200	99.64	
Total rejected ballots		19	0.36	–0.08
Turnout		5,219	74.93	–8.69
Eligible voters		6,965		
Conservative hold		Swing		+0.49
Source: Elections Ontario

1908 Ontario general election
Party	Candidate	Votes	%	±%
Conservative	Charles Anderson	2,618	50.76	+2.02
Liberal	John Allan Auld	2,540	49.24	–2.02
Total valid votes		5,158	99.56	
Total rejected ballots		23	0.44	–0.19
Turnout		5,181	83.62	+7.23
Eligible voters		6,196		
Conservative gain from Liberal		Swing		+2.02
Source: Elections Ontario

1905 Ontario general election
Party	Candidate	Votes	%	±%
Liberal	John Allan Auld	2,828	51.26	–3.41
Conservative	Charles Anderson	2,689	48.74	+3.41
Total valid votes		5,517	99.37	
Total rejected ballots		35	0.63	+0.63
Turnout		5,552	76.39	–38.98
Eligible voters		7,268		
Liberal hold		Swing		–3.41
Source: Elections Ontario

1902 Ontario general election
Party	Candidate	Votes	%	±%
Liberal	John Allan Auld	2,847	54.67	–1.38
Conservative	A. D. Herring	2,361	45.33	+1.38
Total valid votes		5,208	100.00	
Total rejected ballots		–		
Turnout		5,208	115.37	+31.31
Eligible voters		4,514		
Liberal hold		Swing		–1.38
Source: Elections Ontario

1898 Ontario general election
Party	Candidate	Votes	%	±%
Liberal	John Allan Auld	3,138	56.05	–7.32
Conservative	William P. Killackey	2,461	43.95	+7.32
Total valid votes		5,599	99.73	
Total rejected ballots		15	0.27	+0.27
Turnout		5,614	84.07	–
Eligible voters		6,678		
Liberal hold		Swing		–7.32
Source: Elections Ontario

Ontario provincial by-election, August 4, 1896 Death of William Balfour
Party	Candidate	Votes	%	±%
Liberal	John Allan Auld	2,594	63.36	+10.54
Conservative	Egerton Scratch	1,500	36.64	–
Total valid votes		4,094	100.00	
Total rejected ballots		–		
Turnout		4,094	–	–
Eligible voters				
Liberal hold		Swing		+5.27
Source: Elections Ontario

1894 Ontario general election
Party	Candidate	Votes	%	±%
Liberal	William Balfour	2,521	52.82	+0.66
Conservative-Protestant Protective	J. A. Buchanan	1,732	36.29	–
Liberal-Patrons of Industry	R. E. Dodson	520	10.89	–
Total valid votes		4,773	100.00	
Total rejected ballots		–		
Turnout		4,773	79.15	+5.55
Eligible voters		6,030		
Liberal hold		Swing		+0.33
Source: Elections Ontario

1890 Ontario general election
Party	Candidate	Votes	%	±%
Liberal	William Balfour	2,505	52.15	–1.65
Conservative	Charles G. Fox	2,298	47.85	+1.65
Total valid votes		4,803	100.00	
Total rejected ballots		–		
Turnout		4,803	73.61	–3.90
Eligible voters		6,525		
Liberal hold		Swing		–1.65
Source: Elections Ontario

1886 Ontario general election
Party	Candidate	Votes	%	±%
Liberal	William Balfour	2,497	53.80	+3.30
Conservative	N. A. Coste	2,144	46.20	–3.30
Total valid votes		4,641	99.02	
Total rejected ballots		46	0.98	+0.66
Turnout		4,687	77.51	–0.26
Eligible voters		6,047		
Liberal hold		Swing		+3.30
Source: Elections Ontario

1883 Ontario general election
Party	Candidate	Votes	%	±%
Liberal	William Balfour	1,705	50.50	–0.75
Conservative	Solomon White	1,671	49.50	+0.75
Total valid votes		3,376	99.68	
Total rejected ballots		11	0.32	+0.32
Turnout		3,387	77.77	–
Eligible voters		4,355		
Liberal hold		Swing		–0.75
Source: Elections Ontario

Ontario provincial by-election, October 18, 1882
Party	Candidate	Votes	%	±%
Liberal	William Balfour	1,469	51.26	+4.19
Conservative	P. Wright	1,397	48.74	–4.19
Total valid votes		2,866	100.00	
Total rejected ballots		–		
Turnout		2,866	–	–
Eligible voters				
Liberal gain from Conservative		Swing		+4.19
Source: Elections Ontario

1879 Ontario general election
Party	Candidate	Votes	%	±%
Conservative	Lewis Wigle	1,418	52.93	−5.60
Liberal	William Balfour	1,261	47.07	+5.60
Total valid votes		2,679	74.29	
Eligible voters		3,606		
Conservative hold		Swing		−5.60
Source: Elections Ontario

Ontario provincial by-election, September 1875 Previous election voided
Party	Candidate	Votes	%
Conservative	Lewis Wigle	1,310	58.53
Liberal	J.C. Iler	928	41.47
Total valid votes		2,238	
Conservative pickup new district.			
Source: History of the Electoral Districts, Legislatures and Ministries of the Province of Ontario

1875 Ontario general election
Party	Candidate	Votes	%
Conservative	Lewis Wigle	1,014	51.19
Liberal	J.C. Iler	967	48.81
Turnout		1,981	69.61
Eligible voters		2,846	
Election voided
Source: Elections Ontario
