= 4th Parliament of Ontario =

The 4th Parliament of Ontario was in session from June 5, 1879, until February 1, 1883, just prior to the 1883 general election. The majority party was the Liberal Party led by Oliver Mowat.

Charles Clarke served as speaker for the assembly.

== Members of the Assembly ==
Riding	Member	Party	First elected / previously elected	No. of terms	Comments
Addington	Hammel Madden Deroche	Liberal	1871	3rd term	
Algoma	Robert Adam Lyon	Liberal	1878	2nd term	
Brant	James Young	Liberal	1879	1st term	
Brant South	Arthur Sturgis Hardy	Liberal	1873	3rd term	Provincial Secretary and Registrar in Mowat ministry
Brockville	Christopher Finlay Fraser	Conservative	1872	3rd term	Commissioner of Public Works in Mowat ministry
Bruce North	Donald Sinclair	Liberal	1867	4th term	
Bruce South	Rupert Mearse Wells	Liberal	1872	3rd term	resigned June 6, 1882 to contest (successfully) federal seat
Bruce South	Hamilton Parke O'Connor (1882)	Liberal	1882	1st term	elected October 18, 1882
Cardwell	Charles Robinson	Liberal	1879	1st term	
Carleton	George William Monk	Conservative	1871	3rd term	
Cornwall	William Mack	Liberal	1879	1st term	
Dufferin	John Barr	Conservative	1875	2nd term	unseated December 11, 1879 after the election results were appealed
Dufferin	William Jelly (1880)	Conservative	1880	1st term	elected January 9, 1880
Dundas	Andrew Broder	Conservative	1875	2nd term	
Durham East	John Rosevear	Conservative	1875	2nd term	died May 12, 1881
Durham East	Charles Herbert Brereton (1882)	Conservative	1882	1st term	elected June 29, 1882
Durham West	James Wellington McLaughlin	Liberal	1879	1st term	
Elgin East	Thomas McIntyre Nairn	Liberal	1879	1st term	
Elgin West	John Cascaden	Liberal	1879	1st term	
Essex North	Solomon White	Conservative	1878	2nd term	
Essex South	Lewis Wigle	Conservative	1875	2nd term	resigned June 9, 1882 to contest (successfully) federal seat
Essex South	William Douglas Balfour (1882)	Liberal	1882	1st term	elected October 18, 1882
Frontenac	Delino Dexter Calvin	Conservative	1868, 1877	4th term*	
Glengarry	Donald Macmaster	Conservative	1879	1st term	resigned February 1, 1883 after he was elected to federal seat
Glengarry	James Rayside (1882)	Liberal	1882	1st term	elected October 18, 1882
Grenville South	Frederick John French	Conservative	1879	1st term	
Grey East	Abram William Lauder	Conservative	1867	4th term	
Grey North	David Creighton	Conservative	1875	2nd term	
Grey South	James Hill Hunter	Liberal	1875	2nd term	
Haldimand	Jacob Baxter	Liberal	1867	4th term	
Halton	David Robertson	Liberal	1879	1st term	
Hamilton	John Morison Gibson	Liberal	1879	1st term	
Hastings East	Nathaniel Stephen Appleby	Independent Conservative	1875	2nd term	
Hastings North	George Henry Boulter	Conservative	1867	4th term	
Hastings West	Alexander Robertson	Conservative	1879	1st term	resigned June 2, 1882 to contest (successfully) federal seat
Hastings West	Baltis Rose (1882)	Conservative	1882	1st term	elected October 18, 1882
Huron East	Thomas Gibson	Liberal	1871	3rd term	
Huron South	Archibald Bishop	Liberal	1873	3rd term	
Huron West	Alexander McLagan Ross	Liberal	1875	2nd term	
Kent East	Daniel McCraney	Liberal	1875	2nd term	
Kent West	Edward Robinson	Liberal	1879	1st term	
Kingston	James Henry Metcalfe	Conservative	1879	1st term	
Lambton East	Peter Graham	Liberal	1875	2nd term	
Lambton West	Timothy Blair Pardee	Liberal	1867	4th term	Commissioner of Crown Lands in Mowat ministry
Lanark North	William Clyde Caldwell	Liberal	1872, 1879	2nd term*	
Lanark South	William Lees	Independent	1879	1st term	
Leeds North and Grenville North	Henry Merrick	Conservative	1871	3rd term	
Leeds South	William Richardson	Conservative	1879	1st term	
Lennox	George Douglas Hawley	Liberal	1879	1st term	
Lincoln	Sylvester Neelon	Liberal	1875, 1879	2nd term*	
London	William Ralph Meredith	Conservative	1872	3rd term	Leader of the Opposition
Middlesex East	Richard Tooley	Conservative	1871	3rd term	
Middlesex North	John Waters	Liberal	1879	1st term	
Middlesex West	John Watterworth	Liberal	1872	3rd term	
Monck	Richard Harcourt	Liberal	1879	1st term	
Muskoka and Parry Sound	John Classon Miller	Liberal	1875	2nd term	resigned June 2, 1882 to contest (unsuccessfully) federal seat
Muskoka and Parry Sound	James Whitney Bettes (1882)	Liberal	1882	1st term	elected October 30, 1882
Norfolk North	John Bailey Freeman	Liberal	1879	1st term	
Norfolk South	William Morgan	Conservative	1879	1st term	
Northumberland East	James Marshall Ferris	Liberal	1875	2nd term	
Northumberland West	John Collard Field	Liberal	1879	1st term	
Ontario North	Thomas Paxton	Liberal	1867	4th term	resigned February 1, 1883 after he was appointed sheriff
Ontario North	Frank Madill (1881)	Conservative	1881	1st term	elected June 14, 1881
Ontario South	John Dryden	Liberal	1879	1st term	
Ottawa	Patrick Baskerville	Conservative	1879	1st term	
Oxford North	Oliver Mowat	Liberal	1872	3rd term	Premier and Attorney General in Mowat ministry
Oxford South	Adam Crooks	Liberal	1871, (Note: Toronto West) 1875	3rd term*	Minister of Education in Mowat ministry
Peel	Kenneth Chisholm	Liberal	1873	3rd term	
Perth North	David Davidson Hay	Liberal	1875	2nd term	
Perth South	Thomas Ballantyne	Liberal	1875	2nd term	
Peterborough East	Thomas Blezard	Liberal	1879	1st term	
Peterborough West	William Hepburn Scott	Conservative	1874, 1875	3rd term*	died July 11, 1881
Peterborough West	Robert Kincaid (1882)	Conservative	1882	1st term	elected August 24, 1881
Prescott	William Harkin	Conservative	1875	2nd term	died February 11, 1881
Prescott	Albert Peter Hagar (1881)	Liberal	1881	1st term	elected April 22, 1881
Prince Edward	Gideon Striker	Liberal	1871	3rd term	
Renfrew North	Thomas Murray	Liberal	1869, 1879	2nd term*	resigned to contest (unsuccessfully) federal seat (date of resignation unclear)
Renfrew North	William Balmer McAllister (1882)	Conservative	1882	1st term	elected October 18, 1882
Renfrew South	James Bonfield	Liberal	1875	2nd term	
Russell	Adam Jacob Baker	Conservative	1875	2nd term	
Simcoe East	Herman Henry Cook	Liberal	1879	1st term	resigned June 1, 1882 to contest (successfully) federal seat
Simcoe East	Charles Alfred Drury (1882)	Liberal	1882	1st term	elected October 18, 1882
Simcoe South	William James Parkhill	Conservative	1878	2nd term	
Simcoe West	Thomas Long	Conservative	1875	2nd term	
Stormont	Joseph Kerr	Conservative	1879	1st term	
Toronto East	Alexander Morris	Conservative	1879	1st term	
Toronto West	Robert Bell	Conservative	1875	2nd term	
Victoria North	Samuel Stanley Peck	Liberal	1879	1st term	
Victoria South	Samuel Casey Wood	Liberal	1871	3rd term	Treasurer and Commissioner of Agriculture in Mowat ministry
Waterloo North	Moses Springer	Liberal	1867	4th term	resigned April 25, 1879 after he was appointed sheriff
Waterloo North	Elias Weber Bingeman Snider (1881)	Liberal	1881	1st term	elected June 17, 1881
Waterloo South	James Livingston	Liberal	1879	1st term	resigned February 1, 1883 after he was elected to federal seat
Waterloo South	Isaac Master (1882)	Liberal	1877, 1882	2nd term*	elected October 18, 1882
Welland	Daniel Near	Liberal	1879	1st term	
Wellington Centre	Charles Clarke	Liberal	1871	3rd term	Speaker
Wellington South	James Laidlaw	Liberal	1879	1st term	
Wellington West	Robert McKim	Liberal	1867, (Note: Wellington North) 1879	3rd term*	
Wentworth North	James McMahon	Liberal	1875	2nd term	
Wentworth South	Nicholas Awrey	Liberal	1879	1st term	
York East	George Badgerow	Liberal	1879	1st term	
York North	Joseph Henry Widdifield	Liberal	1875	2nd term	
York West	Peter Patterson	Liberal	1871	3rd term	
