= 3rd Parliament of Ontario =

The 3rd Parliament of Ontario was in session from 18 January 1875 until 25 April 1879, following the 1875 general election in which the Liberal Party was returned as the majority party. Oliver Mowat was again the province's Premier.

The Ontario Liquor Licence Act, 1876 (often referred to as the Crooks Act), which transferred control of licenses for the sale of alcohol from individual municipalities to commissioners appointed by the province, was passed.

Rupert Mearse Wells served as speaker for the assembly.

== Members of the Assembly ==
Riding	Member	Party	First elected / previously elected	No. of terms	Comments
Addington	Hammel Madden Deroche	Liberal	1871	2nd term	
Algoma	Simon James Dawson	Liberal	1875	1st term	Member until 26 August 1878. Resigned to enter federal politics.
Algoma	Robert Adam Lyon (1878)	Liberal	1878	1st term	Won byelection, was member from 16 September 1878.
Brant	Hugh Finlayson	Liberal	1867	3rd term	
Brant South	Arthur Sturgis Hardy	Liberal	1873	2nd term	Provincial Secretary and Registrar in Mowat ministry after March 19, 1877
Brockville	Wilmot Howard Cole	Liberal	1875	1st term	
Bruce North	Donald Sinclair	Liberal	1867	3rd term	
Bruce South	Rupert Mearse Wells	Liberal	1872	2nd term	Speaker
Cardwell	John Flesher	Conservative	1875	1st term	
Carleton	George William Monk	Conservative	1871	2nd term	
Cornwall	Alexander Fraser McIntyre	Conservative	1875	1st term	Served 18 January 1875 – 18 June 1875. Election disqualified on 8 June 1875
Cornwall	John Goodall Snetsinger (1875)	Liberal	1872, 1875	2nd term*	Defeated McIntyre in byelection 17 July 1875 and served to end of Parliament session.
Dufferin	John Barr	Conservative	1875	1st term	
Dundas	Andrew Broder	Conservative	1875	1st term	
Durham East	John Rosevear	Conservative	1875	1st term	
Durham West	John McLeod	Liberal	1867, 1872	3rd term*	
Elgin East	John Henry Wilson	Liberal	1871	2nd term	
Elgin West	M.G. Munroe	Conservative	1875	1st term	Member until June 1875 when he was unseated in election trial.
Elgin West	Thomas Hodgins (1875)	Liberal	1871, 1875	2nd term*	As opponent of Munroe, he won the seat upon conclusion of an election trial. Resigned in 1878 to become a candidate for federal politics.
Elgin West	David McLaws (1878)	Liberal	1878	1st term	Won byelection and served from September 1878 until end of Parliament session.
Essex North	James Colebrooke Patterson	Conservative	1875	1st term	Member until September 1878 when he resigned to enter federal politics.
Essex North	Solomon White (1878)	Conservative	1878	1st term	Won byelection and was member after September 1878.
Essex South	Lewis Wigle	Conservative	1875	1st term	
Frontenac	Peter Graham	Conservative	1875	1st term	Died in office in January 1877.
Frontenac	Delino Dexter Calvin (1877)	Conservative	1868, 1877	3rd term*	Won byelection in 1877 and served to end of Parliament session.
Glengarry	Alexander James Grant	Independent-Liberal	1875	1st term	
Grenville South	Christopher Finlay Fraser	Liberal	1872	2nd term	Provincial Secretary and Registrar in Mowat ministry until July 23, 1875? Commissioner of Public Works in Mowat ministry after March 24, 1874
Grey East	Abram William Lauder	Conservative	1867	3rd term	
Grey North	Thomas Scott	Conservative	1867	3rd term	Disqualified in September 1875.
Grey North	David Creighton (1875)	Conservative	1875	1st term	Won byelection and was member from 1 November 1875.
Grey South	James Hill Hunter	Liberal	1875	1st term	
Haldimand	Jacob Baxter	Liberal	1867	3rd term	
Halton	William Barber	Liberal	1867	3rd term	Member until 30 June 1875 after he was unseated in election trial.
Halton	William Durie Lyon (1875)	Liberal	1875	1st term	Won byelection and was member from 15 November 1875 until end of Parliament session.
Hamilton	James Miller Williams	Liberal	1867	3rd term	
Hastings East	Nathaniel Stephen Appleby	Independent-Conservative	1875	1st term	
Hastings North	George Henry Boulter	Conservative	1867	3rd term	
Hastings West	Thomas Wills	Conservative	1875	1st term	
Huron East	Thomas Gibson	Liberal	1871	2nd term	
Huron South	Archibald Bishop	Liberal	1873	2nd term	
Huron West	Alexander McLagan Ross	Liberal	1875	1st term	
Kent East	Archibald McKellar	Liberal	1867	3rd term	Commissioner of Agriculture and Public Works in Mowat ministry until 25 July 1875 when he retired from politics.
Kent East	Daniel McCraney (1875)	Liberal	1875	1st term	Won byelection in 1875 and was member until end of Parliament session.
Kent West	Alexander Coutts	Conservative	1875	1st term	
Kingston	William Robinson	Liberal	1871	2nd term	
Lambton East	Peter Graham	Liberal	1875	1st term	
Lambton West	Timothy Blair Pardee	Liberal	1867	3rd term	Commissioner of Crown Lands in Mowat ministry
Lanark North	William Mostyn	Conservative	1875	1st term	
Lanark South	Abraham Code	Conservative	1869	3rd term	
Leeds North and Grenville North	Henry Merrick	Conservative	1871	2nd term	
Leeds South	Robert Henry Preston	Conservative	1875	1st term	
Lennox	John Thomas Grange	Conservative	1871	2nd term	
Lincoln	Sylvester Neelon	Liberal	1875	1st term	
London	William Ralph Meredith	Conservative	1872	2nd term	Leader of Opposition after c. October 1878
Middlesex East	Richard Tooley	Conservative	1871	2nd term	
Middlesex North	John McDougall	Conservative	1875	1st term	
Middlesex West	John Watterworth	Liberal	1872	2nd term	
Monck	Henry Ryan Haney	Liberal	1872	2nd term	Member until 18 November 1878, having died in office.
Monck	Richard Harcourt (1878)	Liberal	1878	1st term	Won byelection and was in the Legislature as of January 1879 until the end of the Parliament session.
Muskoka and Parry Sound	John Classon Miller	Liberal	1875	1st term	
Norfolk North	John Fitzgerald Clarke	Liberal	1871	2nd term	
Norfolk South	Richard Richardson	Conservative	1875	1st term	
Northumberland East	James Marshall Ferris	Liberal	1875	1st term	
Northumberland West	William Hargraft	Liberal	1875	1st term	
Ontario North	Thomas Paxton	Liberal	1867	3rd term	
Ontario South	Nicholas W. Brown	Conservative	1875	1st term	
Ottawa	Daniel John O'Donoghue	Liberal	1874	2nd term	
Oxford North	Oliver Mowat	Liberal	1872	2nd term	Premier and Attorney General in Mowat ministry
Oxford South	Adam Oliver	Liberal	1867	3rd term	Member until 15 July 1875 after he was unseated by election trial.
Oxford South	Adam Crooks (1875)	Liberal	1871, (Note: Toronto West) 1875	2nd term*	Won byelection in 1875 and was in the Legislature as of December 1875. He served until the end of the Parliament session. Treasurer in Mowat ministry until March 19, 1877; Minister of Education in Mowat ministry after February 19, 1876
Peel	Kenneth Chisholm	Liberal	1873	2nd term	
Perth North	David Davidson Hay	Liberal	1875	1st term	
Perth South	Thomas Ballantyne	Liberal	1875	1st term	
Peterborough East	John C. O'Sullivan	Conservative	1875	1st term	Although unseated by election trial on 2 August 1875, he retained this riding.
Peterborough West	George Albertus Cox	Liberal	1875	1st term	Unseated in election trial 2 August 1875.
Peterborough West	William Hepburn Scott (1875)	Conservative	1874, 1875	2nd term*	Won byelection and was member from December 1875.
Prescott	William Harkin	Conservative	1875	1st term	
Prince Edward	Gideon Striker	Liberal	1871	2nd term	
Renfrew North	Thomas Deacon	Conservative	1871	2nd term	
Renfrew South	James Bonfield	Liberal	1875	1st term	
Russell	Adam Jacob Baker	Conservative	1875	1st term	
Simcoe East	John Kean	Conservative	1875	1st term	
Simcoe South	D'Arcy Edward Boulton	Conservative	1873	2nd term	Died in office 16 February 1875.
Simcoe South	William McDougall (1875)	Independent-Liberal	1875	1st term	Won byelection and was member from 1 June 1875 to 9 September 1878. Resigned early to seek seat in federal House of Commons.
Simcoe South	William James Parkhill (1878)	Conservative	1878	1st term	Won by-election and was member from 1 October 1878.
Simcoe West	Thomas Long	Conservative	1875	1st term	
Stormont	James Bethune	Liberal	1872	2nd term	
Toronto East	Matthew Crooks Cameron	Conservative	1867	3rd term	Leader of the Opposition until c. 1878. Served as member of legislative assembly until 9 January 1879 when he retired from politics.
Toronto East	Alexander Morris (1878)	Conservative	1878	1st term	Won byelection and was member from January 1879 until the end of Parliament session.
Toronto West	Robert Bell	Conservative	1875	1st term	
Victoria North	John David Smith	Liberal	1875	1st term	Was member until 27 August 1875, after being unseated in election trial.
Victoria North	Duncan McRae (1875)	Conservative	1875	1st term	Won byelection.
Victoria South	Samuel Casey Wood	Liberal	1871	2nd term	Retained seat in August 1875 byelection. Commissioner of Agriculture in Mowat ministry after July 23, 1875: Treasurer in Mowat ministry after March 19, 1877
Waterloo North	Moses Springer	Liberal	1867	3rd term	
Waterloo South	John Fleming	Liberal	1875	1st term	Died in office 21 January 1877.
Waterloo South	Isaac Master (1877)	Liberal	1877	1st term	Won byelection after recount and was member from March 1877.
Welland	James George Currie	Liberal	1871	2nd term	
Wellington Centre	Charles Clarke	Liberal	1871	2nd term	
Wellington South	Peter Gow	Liberal	1867	3rd term	Member until 1876 when he resigned.
Wellington South	James Massie (1876)	Liberal	1876	1st term	Won byelection and was in the Legislature as of January 1877 until the end of the Parliament session.
Wellington West	John McGowan	Liberal-Conservative	1874	2nd term	
Wentworth North	Thomas Stock	Conservative	1875	1st term	Disqualified in September 1875. Was Conservative member until 30 June 1875.
Wentworth North	James McMahon (1875)	Liberal	1875	1st term	Won byelection and was in the Legislature as of December 1875 until the end of the Parliament session.
Wentworth South	William Sexton	Liberal	1867	3rd term	
York East	John Lane	Liberal	1875	1st term	
York North	Joseph Henry Widdifield	Liberal	1875	1st term	
York West	Peter Patterson	Liberal	1871	2nd term	

== Election trials ==
The early months of this Parliament were marred by election trials in many ridings. Most of these cases challenged the validity of the election results on such charges as bribery or corruption. A common accusation was that of "treating", where candidates or their agents would buy potential electors alcohol or other favours.

The following ridings and candidates were affected:

Riding	Original Candidate	Comment
Cardwell	Flesher	Retained seat.
Cornwall	McIntyre	Unseated - election voided 8 June 1875, then defeated by Snetsinger in byelection.
Dundas	Broder	Retained seat.
Elgin East	Wilson	Retained seat - charges dropped 13 May 1875.
Essex South	Wigle	Retained seat - originally unseated, but appealed.
Elgin West	M.G. Munroe	Unseated - Hodgins declared the proper member of Legislature after 16 votes declared invalid, leaving Hodgins with a majority of 6 votes.
Grey North	Scott	Unseated - original petition dismissed, but reversed on appeal, therefore Scott disqualified. 8-year ban from office.
Grey South	Hunter	Retained seat - charges dismissed 2 July 1875.
Halton	Barber	Unseated.
Hastings West	Wills	Retained seat - charges dismissed.
Lincoln	Neelon	Retained seat - initially unseated, but regained seat.
London	Meredith	Retained seat.
Middlesex North	McDougall	Retained seat - charges dismissed.
Monck	Haney	Retained seat - election initially voided, byelection called which Haney won.
Muskoka	Miller	Retained seat - initially unseated, but appeals on some aspects of the election trial were still in progress through November 1875.
Northumberland East	Ferris	Retained seat.
Ontario North	Paxton	Retained seat - charges dismissed, upheld on appeal, although the original election was still void and required byelection.
Ontario South	Brown	Retained seat - charges dismissed, case appealed, seat retained.
Oxford South	Oliver	Unseated - lost byelection 25 August 1875
Peel	Chisholm	Retained seat.
Perth North	Hay	Retained seat.
Peterborough East	O'Sullivan	Retained seat - although initially unseated in election trial on 2 August 1875.
Peterborough West	Cox	Unseated - 2 August 1875.
Russell	Baker	Retained seat - charges dismissed, byelection called in which Russell won.
Simcoe East	Kean	Retained seat.
Simcoe West	Long	Retained seat.
Toronto East	Cameron	Retained seat.
Toronto West	Bell	Retained seat.
Victoria North	Smith	Unseated.
Welland	Currie	Retained seat - Currie won byelection.
Wellington West	McGowan	Unseated - byelection called, McGowan regained seat.
Wentworth North	Stock	Unseated - 8-year ban from office.

Source: "What have they gained by it? / Election appeals". The Globe. Toronto, Ontario. 27 September 1875. p. 2..
