= 5th Parliament of Ontario =

The 5th Parliament of Ontario was in session from February 27, 1883, until November 15, 1886, just prior to the 1886 general election. The majority party was the Ontario Liberal Party led by Oliver Mowat.

Charles Clarke served as speaker for the assembly.

== Members of the Assembly ==
Riding	Member	Party	First elected / previously elected	No. of terms	Comments
Addington	George Denison	Conservative	1883	1st term	
Algoma (Note: Algoma split into Algoma East and West on February 1, 1885)	Robert Adam Lyon	Liberal	1878	3rd term	
Algoma East	Robert Adam Lyon	Liberal	1878	3rd term	
Algoma West	James Conmee	Liberal	1885	1st term	elected June 26, 1885
Brant	James Young	Liberal	1879	2nd term	Treasurer and Commissioner of Agriculture in Mowat ministry from June 2 to November 2, 1883
Brant South	Arthur Sturgis Hardy	Liberal	1873	4th term	Provincial Secretary and Registrar in Mowat ministry
Brockville	Christopher Finlay Fraser	Conservative	1872	4th term	Commissioner of Public Works in Mowat ministry
Bruce North	John Gillies	Independent-Liberal	1883	1st term	
Bruce South	Hamilton Parke O'Connor	Liberal	1882	2nd term	
Cardwell	William Henry Hammell	Conservative	1883	1st term	
Carleton	George William Monk	Conservative	1871	4th term	
Cornwall	Alexander Peter Ross	Conservative	1883	1st term	
Dufferin	Robert McGhee	Conservative	1883	1st term	
Dundas	Andrew Broder	Conservative	1875	3rd term	
Durham East	Charles Herbert Brereton	Conservative	1882	2nd term	
Durham West	James Wellington McLaughlin	Liberal	1879	2nd term	
Elgin East	Charles Oaks Ermatinger	Conservative	1883	1st term	
Elgin West	John Cascaden	Liberal	1879	2nd term	
Essex North	Solomon White	Conservative	1878	3rd term	
Essex South	William Douglas Balfour	Liberal	1882	2nd term	
Frontenac	Henry Wilmot	Conservative	1883	1st term	
Glengarry	James Rayside	Liberal	1882	2nd term	
Grenville South	Frederick John French	Conservative	1879	2nd term	
Grey East	Abram William Lauder	Conservative	1867	5th term	died February 20, 1884 (his first name may be Abraham)
Grey East	Neil McColman (1884)	Conservative	1884	1st term	elected March 18, 1884
Grey North	David Creighton	Conservative	1875	3rd term	
Grey South	John Blythe	Conservative	1883	1st term	
Haldimand	Jacob Baxter	Liberal	1867	5th term	
Halton	William Kerns	Conservative	1883	1st term	
Hamilton	John Morison Gibson	Liberal	1879	2nd term	
Hastings East	William Parker Hudson	Conservative	1883	1st term	
Hastings North	Alpheus Field Wood	Conservative	1883	1st term	
Hastings West	Ephraim George Sills	Liberal	1883	1st term	
Huron East	Thomas Gibson	Liberal	1871	4th term	
Huron South	Archibald Bishop	Liberal	1873	4th term	
Huron West	Alexander McLagan Ross	Liberal	1875	3rd term	Treasurer and Commissioner of Agriculture in Mowat ministry after November 2, 1883
Kent East	Daniel McCraney	Liberal	1875	3rd term	died February 28, 1885
Kent East	Robert Ferguson (1885)	Liberal	1885	1st term	elected June 20, 1885
Kent West	James Clancy	Conservative	1883	1st term	
Kingston	James Henry Metcalfe	Conservative	1879	2nd term	
Lambton East	Peter Graham	Liberal	1875	3rd term	
Lambton West	Timothy Blair Pardee	Liberal	1867	5th term	Commissioner of Crown Lands in Mowat ministry
Lanark North	William Clyde Caldwell	Liberal	1872, 1879	3rd term*	
Lanark South	William Lees	Independent	1879	2nd term	
Leeds North and Grenville North	Henry Merrick	Conservative	1871	4th term	
Leeds South	Robert Henry Preston	Conservative	1875, 1883	2nd term*	
Lennox	Alexander Hall Roe	Liberal	1883	1st term	died July 12, 1884
Lennox	George Douglas Hawley (1884)	Liberal	1879, 1884	2nd term*	elected August 25, 1884
Lincoln	Sylvester Neelon	Liberal	1875, 1879	3rd term*	
London	William Ralph Meredith	Conservative	1872	4th term	Leader of the Opposition
Middlesex East	Donald MacKenzie	Liberal	1883	1st term	
Middlesex North	John Waters	Liberal	1879	2nd term	
Middlesex West	Alexander Johnston	Conservative	1883	1st term	unseated November 15, 1883(?) after an appeal
Middlesex West	George William Ross (1883)	Liberal	1883	1st term	elected December 14, 1883; Minister of Education in Mowat ministry after November 23, 1883
Monck	Richard Harcourt	Liberal	1879	2nd term	
Muskoka and Parry Sound	Frederick G. Fauquier	Conservative	1883	1st term	unseated November 15, 1883(?) after an appeal
Muskoka and Parry Sound	Jacob William Dill (1884)	Liberal	1884	1st term	elected July 23, 1884
Norfolk North	John Bailey Freeman	Liberal	1879	2nd term	
Norfolk South	William Morgan	Conservative	1879	2nd term	
Northumberland East	James Marshall Ferris	Liberal	1875	3rd term	
Northumberland West	Robert Mulholland	Conservative	1883	1st term	
Ontario North	Isaac James Gould	Liberal	1883	1st term	
Ontario South	John Dryden	Liberal	1879	2nd term	
Ottawa	Patrick Baskerville	Conservative	1879	2nd term	
Oxford North	Oliver Mowat	Liberal	1872	4th term	Premier and Attorney General in Mowat ministry
Oxford South	Adam Crooks	Liberal	1871, (Note: Toronto West) 1875	4th term*	Minister of Education in Mowat ministry until November 23, 1883 resigned from legislative assembly February 14, 1884
Oxford South	George Atwell Cooke (1884)	Liberal	1884	1st term	elected March 5, 1884
Peel	Kenneth Chisholm	Liberal	1873	4th term	
Perth North	John George Hess	Conservative	1883	1st term	
Perth South	Thomas Ballantyne	Liberal	1875	3rd term	
Peterborough East	Thomas Blezard	Liberal	1879	2nd term	
Peterborough West	John Carnegie	Conservative	1867, 1883	2nd term*	
Prescott	Albert Peter Hagar	Liberal	1881	2nd term	
Prince Edward	James Hart	Independent-Liberal	1883	1st term	
Renfrew North	Thomas Murray	Liberal	1869, 1879, 1883	3rd term*	
Renfrew South	John Francis Dowling	Liberal	1883	1st term	
Russell	Honoré Robillard	Liberal-Conservative	1883	1st term	
Simcoe East	Charles Alfred Drury	Liberal	1882	2nd term	
Simcoe South	George Prevost McKay	Conservative	1883	1st term	
Simcoe West	Orson James Phelps	Liberal	1883	1st term	
Stormont	Joseph Kerr	Conservative	1879	2nd term	
Toronto East	Alexander Morris	Conservative	1879	2nd term	
Toronto West	Henry Edward Clarke	Conservative	1883	1st term	
Victoria North	John Fell	Conservative	1883	1st term	
Victoria South	Duncan John McIntyre	Liberal	1883	1st term	
Waterloo North	Elias Weber Bingeman Snider	Liberal	1881	2nd term	
Waterloo South	Isaac Master	Liberal	1877, 1882	3rd term*	
Welland	James E. Morin	Liberal	1883	1st term	
Wellington Centre	Charles Clarke	Liberal	1871	4th term	Speaker
Wellington South	James Laidlaw	Liberal	1879	2nd term	
Wellington West	Robert McKim	Liberal	1867, (Note: Wellington North) 1879	4th term*	
Wentworth North	James McMahon	Liberal	1875	3rd term	
Wentworth South	Nicholas Awrey	Liberal	1879	2nd term	
York East	George Badgerow	Liberal	1879	2nd term	
York North	Joseph Henry Widdifield	Liberal	1875	3rd term	
York West	John Gray	Conservative	1883	1st term	
