= Mowat ministry =

Cabinet of Ontario, 1872-1896

- 3rd ministry of Ontario

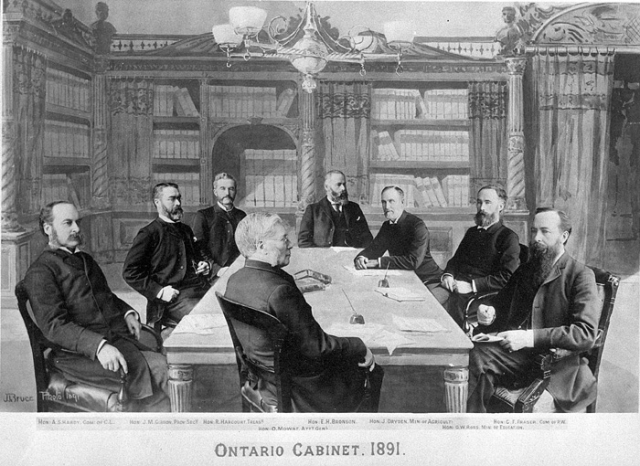
- The Mowat ministry as of 1891
- Date formed: October 25, 1872
- Date dissolved: July 21, 1896

People and organisations
- Monarch: Victoria
Lieutenant Governors
Lieutenant Governor	William Pearce Howland (1872-1873); John Willoughby Crawford (1873-1875); William Buell Richards (1875); Donald Alexander Macdonald (1875-1880); John Beverley Robinson (1880-1887); Alexander Campbell (1887-1892); John Hawkins Hagarty (1892); George Airey Kirkpatrick (1892-1896)
- Premier: Oliver Mowat
- No. of ministers: 8
- Total no. of members: 17
- Member party: Liberal Party
- Status in legislature: Majority
- Opposition party: Conservative
- Opposition leader: Matthew Crooks Cameron (1872-1878); William Ralph Meredith (1878-1894); George Marter (1894-1896)

History
- Incoming formation: Resignation (Edward Blake)
- Outgoing formation: Resignation
- Elections: 1875, 1879, 1883, 1886, 1890, 1894
- Legislature terms: 2nd (ministry formed mid term), 3rd, 4th, 5th, 6th, 7th, 8th Parliaments of Ontario
- Predecessor: Blake ministry
- Successor: Hardy ministry

The Mowat ministry was the cabinet of the Government of Ontario (formally the Executive Council of Ontario) from October 25, 1872, to July 21, 1896. It was led by its namesake Sir Oliver Mowat, the longest serving Premier of Ontario and the most electorally successful leader of the Ontario Liberal Party. With tenures of close to twenty-four years, Mowat and his ministry remain the premier and the ministry with the greatest longevity in Ontario's history, nearly ten years longer than the second longest ministry Davis ministry.

The ministry was made up of members of the Liberal Party. The ministry inherited its governing mandate from its predecessor Blake ministry during Ontario's second parliament following Premier Edward Blake's resignation (in order to focus on national politics). The ministry secured its own electoral mandate in six subsequent elections between 1875 and 1894, obtaining majority of the seats in Ontario's third through eighth parliaments. During the 1896 dominion election, Mowat lend his prestige as Ontario Premier for close to a quarter century to the national Liberal leader Wilfrid Laurier and devoted himself fully to campaign under the slogan "Laurier, Mowat and Victory". The ministry transitioned to become the Hardy ministry when Mowat resigned to become Minister of Justice in the Laurier ministry. Mowat's mantle was succeeded by Arthur Sturgis Hardy, a member of the ministry for nineteen of its twenty-four years.

== Formation ==
As Premier Edward Blake was contemplating his departure in the summer of 1872, Mowat was neither a member of the legislative assembly nor a member of the predecessor Blake ministry, but was at the time the Vice-Chancellor of the Court of Chancery. He was however no stranger to Liberal politics, having been a key lieutenant of George Brown, the leader of the Liberal Party before Canadian Confederation, and a member of the Legislative Assembly of the Province of Canada between 1858 and 1864. He served as Postmaster General, a cabinet post, in three different pre-confederation ministries: the short-lived Liberal ministry led by George Brown in 1858, in the Liberal ministry led by John Sandfield Macdonald between May 1963 and March 1964, and in the early days of the Great Coalition from June to November 1864. He also had an instrumental role in working out the division of powers between the federal and provincial governments at the 1864 Quebec Conference.

With the imminent departure of not only Blake but also the provincial treasurer, the future prime minister Alexander Mackenzie, and at the urging of his long time associate Brown, Mowat resigned his judicial post and assumed the offices of Premier and Attorney General of Ontario. The controversial move was deprecated by his political opponents and Mowat responded with a constitutional justification: “Her Majesty has a right to call to her Council any of her subjects, whether he happens to hold a judicial or any other office” and likewise used constitutional forms to avoid any personal explanation for his decision.

The thirty-four years of the successive Blake-Mowat-Hardy-Ross Liberal ministries operated in essense as one continuous administration with the members of the twenty-four-year Mowat ministry forming its core. It inherited three of the four remaining minister of Blake ministry. Until the final three month of the Ross ministry, there were at most three ministers present in either the Hardy or the Ross ministry that did not serve under Mowat.

== Changes to ministry ==
Mowat's initial cabinet consist of only five members, conforming to the five-office executive structure prescribed by section 63 of the British North America Act, 1867. The act had no specific mention of the position of the Premier, and there was no separate department or a budget for either a premier's office or cabinet office. (Note: Such an office was not provided for until 1905 by Premier James Whitney.) Mowat took on the office of the Attorney General, following a tradition set by many pre-confederation premiers. (Note: For 21 of the 26 years of the Province of Canada, the joint premiers from Canada West were concurrently the attorney general for Upper Canada. The newly created province followed that custom for its first few decades, with the head of the government during 32 of the province first 38 years.)

Of the six members of the outgoing Blake ministry, provincial secretary Peter Gow departed for health reasons in addition to Blake and treasurer Mackenzie. Commissioner of Agriculture and Public Works Archibald McKellar and Commissioner of Crown Lands Richard William Scott continued in their roles while Adam Crooks assumed the role of Treasurer. They were joined by Timothy Pardee as Provincial Secretary in addition to Mowat, who doubled duty as Attorney General for the entire duration of the ministry.

=== Expansion & creation of new department ===
The Government of Ontario, and correspondingly the cabinet, expanded from five to seven departments/members on a permanent basis over Oliver Mowat's 24-year premiership. The first structural change came in 1874, when a sixth department was created with public works formally splitting off from agriculture. In 1876 upon the retirement of Rev. Dr. Egerton Ryerson, the long time civil servant who served as Chief Superintendent of Schools for Upper Canada and then Ontario for a total of 32 years, education was formally made a ministerial portfolio.

The size of cabinet however remained at six for another 12 years. The education portfolio was initially held concurrently by Treasurer Adam Crooks, who served as vice-chancellor of the University of Toronto prior to his election. While Crook was relieved of the treasury portfolio in 1877 to focus on education matters, subsequent treasurers instead concurrently held the agriculture portfolio, then the principal department responsible for a wide range of economic development matters. Cabinet was finally expanded to seven members in 1888 with the entrant Charles Drury as Commissioner of Agriculture. Drury's son Ernest would in a few decades head a ministry of a rival party, add three more departments in four short years, and break the Liberal-Conservative duopoly in Ontario politics while at it.

An eighth member was added in 1890, when Mowat appointed Erskine Henry Bronson, an early advocate for industrial policy and active government involvement with industry, as a minister without portfolio.

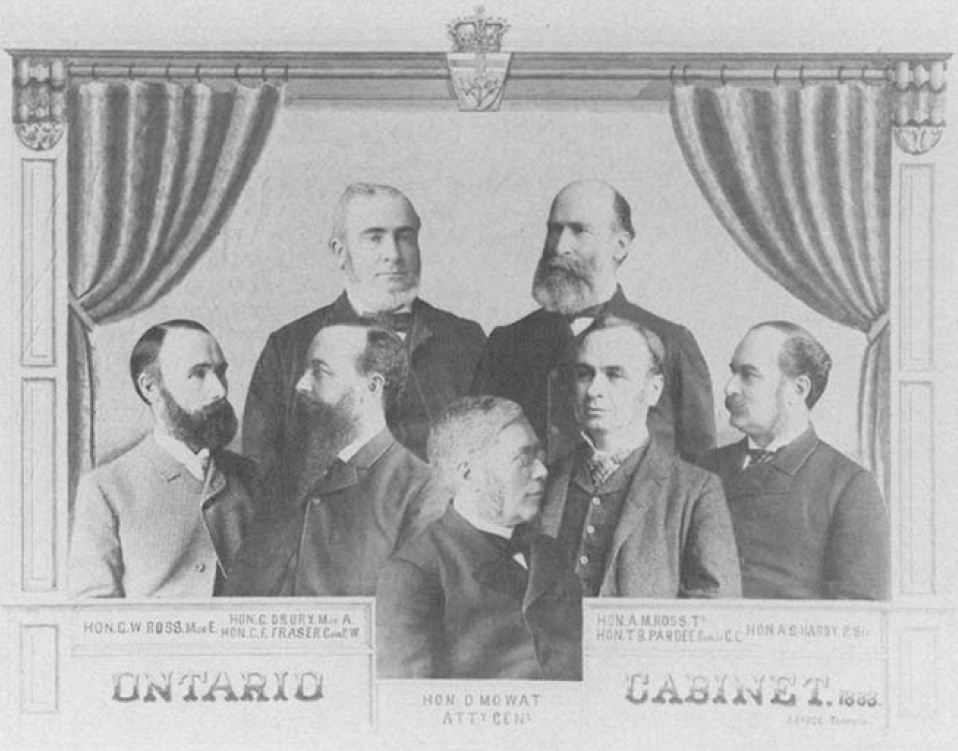
Mowat ministry in 1888, with approximately two-third of its twenty-four-year tenure lapsed, and the two successor premiers Arthur Hardy and George Ross included already members. Left to right: (top row) Drury, A. Ross (front row) G. Ross, Fraser, Mowat, Pardee, Hardy

=== Change to the ministry ===
For a cabinet that held office for 24 years, it experienced remarkably few changes. Mowat led the Liberals through six general elections, securing six majority mandates. He made no changes to ministry before or after two of those elections.

== Top ranks among of portfolio ministers with longest tenure ==
In addition to being the longest serving Premier of Ontario at twenty-four years, Mowat's 24-year tenure at the Attorney General's office also secured him the distinction of being the longest serving portfolio minister of any portfolio.

On the score portfolio ministers with the longest tenure, Mowat's ministers occupy three of the next four positions:

- 2nd longest - Christopher Fraser, twenty years as Commissioner of Public Works
- 4th longest - George Ross, sixteen years as Minister of Education (started under Mowat and continued under Hardy)
- 5th longest - Timothy Pardee, fifteen years as Commissioner of Crown Lands
- 6th longest - John Dryden, fourteen and a half years as Minister of Agriculture (started under Mowat and continued under Hardy and Ross)

The missing third place was claimed Charles Daley, who served eighteen years as labour minister in the Drew ministry and Frost ministry (1943–1961).

== List of ministers ==
=== Ordered by seniority ===
The following list is includsive of all members of successive Blake, Mowat, Hardy, Ross ministries. With the following indicators:

Did not serve in Mowat ministry
Started/ended service during Blake Ministry

Started/ended service during Hardy Ministry
Started/ended service during Ross Ministry

Minister	Ministerial service			Parliamentary service			Note
Minister	Start	End	Timespan	Start	Electoral District	Region	Note
Oliver Mowat	(Note: Served in Executive Council of the Province of Canada before Confederation) Aug 2, 1858; Oct 25, 1872	July 21, 1896		1857 (Note: Election to Legislative Assembly of the Province of Canada before Confederation)	Oxford North	Southwest	(Note: Longest serving Ontario Premier, and longest serving Ontario Attorney General) (Note: Later served as senator, minister in Dominion Laurier ministry, and Lieutenant Governor of Ontario)
Archibald McKellar	Dec 20, 1871	July 23, 1875		1857	Bothwell	Southwest	
Alexander Mackenzie	Dec 20, 1871	Oct 25, 1872		1861	Middlesex West	Southwest	(Note: Also MP and later served as Prime Minister of Canada)
Edward Blake	Dec 20, 1871	Oct 25, 1872		1867	Bruce South	Midwest	(Note: Also MP and later served as national leader of the Liberal Party, a minister in the Dominion Mackenzie ministry, and MP in the Parliament of United Kingdom)
Adam Crooks	Dec 20, 1871	Nov 23, 1883		1871	Toronto West; Oxford South	Southwest	(Note: Ontario's first education minister)
Richard William Scott	Dec 21, 1871	Dec 4, 1873		1857	Ottawa	East	(Note: Later served as MP, senator and minister in the Dominion Mackenzie ministry)
Peter Gow	Dec 21, 1871	Oct 25, 1872		1867	Wellington South	Grand River	
Timothy Blair Pardee	Oct 25, 1872	Jan 18, 1889		1867	Lambton	Southwest	(Note: Longest serving minister for crown lands/natural resource of Ontario)
Christopher Finlay Fraser	Nov 25, 1873	† (Note: Mowat announced Fraser's departure from cabinet on February 28 due to ill health, but that he remained head of the public works department until May 30, and transfer to the position of Inspector of Registrar Office and continued to work until dying in office on August 24.)May 30, 1894		1872	Grenville South	East	(Note: Longest serving minister for public works/infrastructure of Ontario)
Samuel Wood	July 23, 1875	June 2, 1883		1871	Victoria South	Central (E)	
Arthur Sturgis Hardy	March 19, 1877	Oct 21, 1899		1873	Brant South	Grand River	
James Young	June 2, 1883	Nov 1, 1883		1879	Brant North	Grand River	(Note: Served as MP prior)
Alexander Ross	Nov 2, 1883	May 1, 1888		1875	Huron West	Midwest	
George William Ross	Nov 23, 1883	Feb 8, 1905		1883	Middlesex West	Southwest	(Note: Later served as senator, knighted in 1910) (Note: Ontario's longest serving education minister)
Charles Alfred Drury	May 1, 1888	Sep 30, 1890		1882	Simcoe East	Central	(Note: Father of later United Farmers Premier Ernest Charles Drury)
John Morison Gibson	Jan 18, 1889	Feb 8, 1905		1879	Hamilton; Hamilton West; Wellington East	Grand River	(Note: Later served as Lieutenant Governor of Ontario, knighted 1912)
Richard Harcourt	Sep 16, 1890	Feb 8, 1905		1878	Monck	Grand River	
Erskine Henry Bronson	Sep 16, 1890	Dec 16, 1898		1886	Ottawa	East	
John Dryden	Sep 30, 1890	Feb 8, 1905		1879	Ontario South	Central	
William Harty	May 30, 1894	Oct 21, 1899		1892	Kingston	East	(Note: Later served as MP)
William Balfour	July 21, 1896	†Aug 19, 1896		1882	Essex South	Southwest	
Elihu Davis	Aug 28, 1896	Nov 22, 1904		1888	York North	Central	
James Thompson Garrow	Nov 21, 1898	Oct 21, 1899		1890	Huron West	Midwest	
James Robert Stratton	Oct 21, 1899	Nov 22, 1904		1886	Peterborough West	Central (E)	
Francis Robert Latchford	Oct 21, 1899	Feb 8, 1905		1899	Renfrew South	East	
Alfred Évanturel	Nov 22, 1904	Feb 8, 1905		1886	Prescott	East	(Note: Served as Speaker of the Legislative Assembly; first francophone to serve in Ontario cabinet)
William Andrew Charlton	Nov 22, 1904	Feb 8, 1905		1890	Norfolk South	Grand River	(Note: Later served as MP, sworn of council in 1921)
George Perry Graham	Nov 22, 1904	Feb 8, 1905		1898	Brockville	East	(Note: Briefly served as party Later, Later MP/senator and minister in Dominion Laurier ministry)
A.G. MacKay	Nov 22, 1904	Feb 8, 1905		1902	Grey North	Midwest	(Note: Later served as party leader, Alberta MLA, and minister in the Alberta Stewart ministry; Alberta’s first health minister)

=== By portfolio ===
Portfolio	Minister	Tenure	
Portfolio	Minister	Start	End
Premier & President of the Council (Note: Premier was an informal title for the person invited to form and then to lead the government, and was used interchangeably with the title "Prime Minister of Ontario". President of the Council was a formal title/office but one without its own department until 1905. In contemporary official documentation, Mowat was formally referred as Attorney General, his ministerial office.)	Oliver Mowat	October 25, 1872	July 21, 1896
Attorney General	Oliver Mowat	October 25, 1872	July 21, 1896
Treasurer	Adam Crooks	October 25, 1872	March 19, 1877
Treasurer	Samuel Wood	March 19, 1877	June 2, 1883
Treasurer	James Young	June 2, 1883	November 1, 1883
Treasurer	Alexander Ross	November 1, 1883	September 16, 1890
Treasurer	Richard Harcourt	September 16, 1890	July 21, 1896
Provincial Secretary and Registrar	Timothy Pardee	October 25, 1872	November 25, 1873
Provincial Secretary and Registrar	Christopher Fraser	November 25, 1873	April 4, 1874
Provincial Secretary and Registrar	Archibald McKellar	April 4, 1874	July 23, 1875
Provincial Secretary and Registrar	Samuel Wood	July 23, 1875	March 19, 1877
Provincial Secretary and Registrar	Arthur Sturgis Hardy	March 19, 1877	January 18, 1889
Provincial Secretary and Registrar	John Gibson	January 18, 1889	July 21, 1896
Commissioner of Crown Lands	Richard Scott	October 25, 1872	December 4, 1873
Commissioner of Crown Lands	Timothy Pardee	December 4, 1873	January 18, 1889
Commissioner of Crown Lands	Arthur Sturgis Hardy	January 18, 1889	July 21, 1896
Commissioner of Agriculture & Public Works (Note: On March 24, 1874, An Act to Amend the Act entitled "An Act Respecting the Public Works of Ontario" came into force, formally split off the public works portion into a standalone department with its own commissioner.)	Archibald McKellar	October 25, 1872	March 24, 1874
Commissioner of Agriculture	Archibald McKellar	March 24, 1874	July 23, 1875
Commissioner of Agriculture	Samuel Wood	July 23, 1875	June 2, 1883
Commissioner of Agriculture	James Young	June 2, 1883	November 2, 1883
Commissioner of Agriculture	Alexander Ross	November 2, 1883	May 1, 1888
Commissioner of Agriculture	Charles Drury	May 1, 1888	September 16, 1890
Commissioner of Agriculture	John Dryden	September 16, 1890	April 16, 1895
Minister of Agriculture (Note: On April 16th 1895, An Act respecting the Department of Agriculture came into force, which create the new department and the new ministerial title of Minister of Agriculture)	John Dryden	April 16, 1895	July 21, 1896
Commissioner of Public Works (Note: combined with Agriculture as "Commissioner of Agriculture and Public Works" from October 25, 1872 to March 24, 1874.)	Christopher Fraser	April 4, 1874	May 30, 1894
Commissioner of Public Works	William Harty	May 30, 1894	October 21, 1896
Minister of Education (Note: Upon the retirement of Egerton Ryerson, an education department headed by a minister in the legislation was formally established upon the coming into force of An Act respecting the Education Department)	Adam Crooks	February 19, 1876	November 23, 1883
Minister of Education	George Ross	November 23, 1883	July 21, 1896
Minister without Portfolio	Erskine Henry Bronson	September 16, 1890	July 21, 1896
