= 1883 Ontario general election =

Canadian provincial election

- February 27, 1883

88 seats in the 5th Legislative Assembly of Ontario 45 seats were needed for a majority
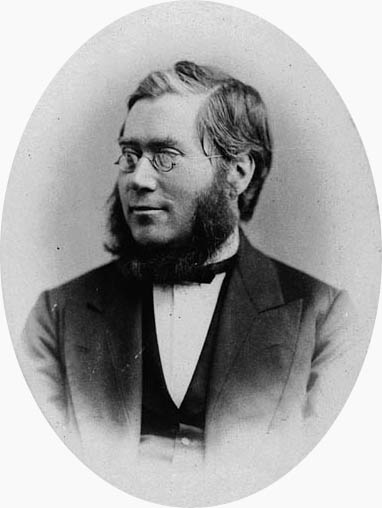

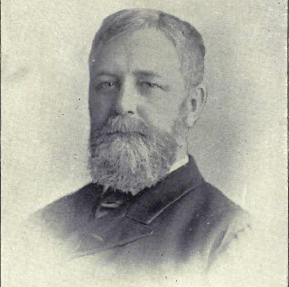
	First party	Second party
Leader	Oliver Mowat	William Ralph Meredith
Party	Liberal	Conservative
Leader since	1872	1879
Leader's seat	Oxford North	London
Last election	57	29
Seats won	48	37
Seat change	▼9	▲8
Premier before election
Oliver Mowat
Liberal
Premier after election
Oliver Mowat
Liberal

The 1883 Ontario general election was the fifth general election held in the province of Ontario, Canada, to elect the 88 Members of the 5th Legislative Assembly of Ontario ("MLAs"). Held on February 27, 1883, the fifth Ontario provincial election was until 2025 the only one ever contested in the month of February.

The Ontario Liberal Party, led by Oliver Mowat, won a fourth consecutive term in government, despite losing nine seats in the Legislature.

The Ontario Conservative Party, led by William Ralph Meredith, won eight additional seats.

== Results ==
Elections to the 5th Parliament of Ontario (1883)
Political party	Party leader	MNAs				Votes			
Political party	Party leader	Candidates	1879	1883	±	#	±	%	± (pp)
Liberal	Oliver Mowat	87	57	48	9▼	125,017	5,869▲	48.20%	0.13▲
Conservative	William Ralph Meredith	80	29	37	8▲	120,853	2,340▲	46.59%	1.23▼
Independent Liberal		3	–	2	2▲	3,239	3,239▲	1.25%	New
Independent		8	–	1	1▲	3,956	3,071▲	1.53%	1.73▼
Independent Conservative		4	2	–	2▼	2,354	243▲	0.91%	0.06▲
Labour		3	–	–	–	3,957	3,957▲	1.53%	New
Total		185	88	88		259,376		100.00%	
Rejected ballots						1,722	1,722▲		
Voter turnout						261,098	13,241▲	67.95	4.73▲
Registered electors						384,255	7,830▼		
Acclamations		█ Liberal		4					
Acclamations		█ Conservative		1					

Seats and popular vote by party
Party	Seats	Votes	Change (pp)
█ Liberal	48 / 88	48.20%	0.13
█ Conservative	37 / 88	46.59%	-1.23
█ Independent Liberal	2 / 88	1.25%	1.25
█ Independent	1 / 88	1.53%	-1.73
█ Independent Conservative	0 / 88	0.91%	0.06
█ Labour	0 / 88	1.53%	1.53

=== Synopsis of results ===
Results by riding - 1879 Ontario general election
Riding	Winning party						Turnout	Votes						
Name (Note: order is as given in EO reports)	1879	Party	Votes	Share	Margin #	Margin %	Turnout	Lib	Con	Lab	I-Lib	I-Con	Ind	Total
Addington	Lib	Con	1,739	52.78%	183	5.55%	76.31%	1,556	1,739	–	–	–	–	3,295
Algoma	Lib	Lib	1,625	51.82%	114	3.64%	n/a	1,625	1,511	–	–	–	–	3,136
Brant North	Lib	Lib	acclaimed											
Brant South	Lib	Lib	1,563	60.89%	559	21.78%	54.74%	1,563	1,004	–	–	–	–	2,567
Brockville	Lib	Lib	1,516	56.40%	344	12.80%	61.63%	1,516	–	–	–	1,172	–	2,688
Bruce North	Lib	I-Lib	1,186	52.66%	120	5.33%	44.23%	1,066	–	–	1,186	0	–	2,252
Bruce South	Lib	Lib	acclaimed											
Cardwell	Lib	Con	1,500	50.68%	40	1.35%	80.17%	1,460	1,500	–	–	–	–	2,960
Carleton	Con	Con	1,302	55.86%	820	35.18%	51.72%	237	1,784 (Note: the incumbent George William Monk was the winning candidate)	–	–	–	310	2,331
Cornwall	Lib	Con	710	51.49%	41	2.97%	70.33%	669	710	–	–	–	–	1,379
Dufferin	Con	Con	1,051	47.13%	369	16.55%	50.18%	–	1,051	–	–	1,179 (Note: the incumbent William Jelly ran as an Independent Conservative, getting 682 votes)	–	2,230
Dundas	Con	Con	1,798	52.21%	152	4.41%	77.32%	1,646	1,798	–	–	–	–	3,444
Durham East	Con	Con	1,496	53.85%	214	7.70%	65.33%	1,282	1,496	–	–	–	–	2,778
Durham West	Lib	Lib	1,480	52.63%	148	5.26%	73.79%	1,480	1,332	–	–	–	–	2,812
Elgin East	Lib	Con	2,416	50.95%	90	1.90%	66.03%	2,326	2,416	–	–	–	–	4,742
Elgin West	Lib	Lib	1,324	51.26%	65	2.52%	72.26%	1,324	1,259	–	–	–	–	2,583
Essex North	Con	Con	1,537	55.93%	326	11.86%	59.60%	1,211	1,537 (Note: Solomon White campaigned in two ridings)	–	–	–	–	2,748
Essex South	Con	Lib	1,705	50.50%	34	1.01%	77.77%	1,705	1,671	–	–	–	–	3,376
Frontenac	Con	Con	1,103	54.25%	173	8.51%	75.81%	930	1,103	–	–	–	–	2,033
Glengarry	Con	Lib	1,436	52.07%	114	4.13%	74.18%	1,436	1,322	–	–	–	–	2,758
Grenville South	Con	Con	1,194	51.20%	56	2.40%	73.19%	1,138	1,194	–	–	–	–	2,332
Grey East	Con	Con	1,548	52.85%	167	5.70%	62.00%	–	1,548	–	–	–	1,381	2,929
Grey North	Con	Con	2,048	51.97%	155	3.93%	70.14%	1,893	2,048	–	–	–	–	3,941
Grey South	Lib	Con	1,596	52.97%	179	5.94%	74.62%	1,417	1,596	–	–	–	–	3,013
Haldimand	Lib	Lib	1,708	50.91%	61	1.82%	78.88%	1,708	1,647	–	–	–	–	3,355
Halton	Lib	Con	2,004	51.93%	149	3.86%	68.06%	1,855	2,004	–	–	–	–	3,859
Hamilton	Lib	Lib	2,077	39.78%	155	2.97%	63.07%	2,077	1,922	1,222	–	–	–	5,221
Hastings East	I-Con	Con	1,426	51.39%	77	2.77%	77.60%	1,349	1,426	–	–	–	–	2,775
Hastings North	Con	Con	1,324	54.26%	208	8.52%	64.93%	1,116	1,324	–	–	–	–	2,440
Hastings West	Con	Lib	1,217	50.48%	23	0.95%	61.06%	1,217	1,194	–	–	–	–	2,411
Huron East	Lib	Lib	1,994	50.52%	41	1.04%	75.58%	1,994	1,953	–	–	–	–	3,947
Huron South	Lib	Lib	1,962	51.74%	132	3.48%	71.07%	1,962	1,830	–	–	–	–	3,792
Huron West	Lib	Lib	2,061	52.11%	167	4.22%	67.56%	2,061	1,894	–	–	–	–	3,955
Kent East	Lib	Lib	1,947	52.61%	193	5.21%	63.36%	1,947	1,754	–	–	–	–	3,701
Kent West	Lib	Con	2,299	55.12%	427	10.24%	58.10%	1,872	2,299	–	–	–	–	4,171
Kingston	Con	Con	951	52.69%	108	5.98%	59.93%	843	951	–	–	–	3	1,805
Lambton East	Lib	Lib	2,017	51.44%	113	2.88%	71.80%	2,017	1,904	–	–	–	–	3,921
Lambton West	Lib	Lib	1,943	55.26%	370	10.52%	57.62%	1,943	1,573	–	–	–	–	3,516
Lanark North	Lib	Lib	1,247	54.19%	193	8.39%	72.68%	1,247	1,054	–	–	–	–	2,301
Lanark South	I-Con	Ind	1,089	46.56%	29	1.24%	61.79%	1,188	–	–	–	–	1,151 (Note: the incumbent William Lees ran and won as an independent candidate)	2,339
Leeds North and Grenville North	Con	Con	837	49.94%	1	0.06%	60.18%	836	837	–	–	3	–	1,676
Leeds South	Con	Con	1,553	55.09%	287	10.18%	69.08%	1,266	1,553	–	–	–	–	2,819
Lennox	Lib	Con	1,502	53.06%	173	6.11%	73.09%	1,329	1,502	–	–	–	–	2,831
Lincoln	Lib	Lib	acclaimed											
London	Con	Con	acclaimed											
Middlesex East	Con	Lib	2,702	50.80%	85	1.60%	66.01%	2,702	2,617	–	–	–	–	5,319
Middlesex North	Lib	Lib	1,946	50.47%	36	0.93%	75.05%	1,946	1,910	–	–	–	–	3,856
Middlesex West	Lib	Con	1,835	51.21%	87	2.43%	77.21%	1,748	1,835	–	–	–	–	3,583
Monck	Lib	Lib	1,574	52.17%	131	4.34%	77.93%	1,574	1,443	–	–	–	–	3,017
Muskoka and Parry Sound	Lib	Con	2,278	52.30%	200	4.59%	66.47% (Note: Part of the district was unorganized territory, for which voter's lists were not prepared. Total valid ballots were 4,356 of which 1,815 came from such territory. Net amount was 2,541 plus 16 rejected ballots giving 2,557 net turnout. Compared to 3,847 registered voters, this gives a turnout of 66.47%.)	2,078	2,278	–	–	–	–	4,356
Norfolk North	Lib	Lib	1,633	57.54%	428	15.08%	69.29%	1,633	1,205	–	–	–	–	2,838
Norfolk South	Con	Con	1,492	50.49%	29	0.98%	73.68%	1,463	1,492	–	–	–	–	2,955
Northumberland East	Lib	Lib	2,156	50.91%	77	1.82%	77.37%	2,156	2,079	–	–	–	–	4,235
Northumberland West	Lib	Con	1,506	50.96%	57	1.93%	71.97%	1,449	1,506	–	–	–	–	2,955
Ontario North	Lib	Lib	2,412	50.25%	24	0.50%	73.11%	2,412	2,388	–	–	–	–	4,800
Ontario South	Lib	Lib	1,743	53.06%	201	6.12%	66.17%	1,743	1,542	–	–	–	–	3,285
Ottawa	Con	Con	1,363	48.49%	528	18.78%	51.65%	835	1,363	–	–	–	613	2,811
Oxford North	Lib	Lib	acclaimed											
Oxford South	Lib	Lib	1,640	53.77%	230	7.54%	52.71%	1,640	1,410	–	–	–	–	3,050
Peel	Lib	Lib	1,521	51.40%	83	2.81%	76.40%	1,521	1,438	–	–	–	–	2,959
Perth North	Lib	Con	2,642	51.14%	118	2.28%	72.78%	2,524	2,642	–	–	–	–	5,166
Perth South	Lib	Lib	1,712	53.35%	215	6.70%	69.88%	1,712	1,497	–	–	–	–	3,209
Peterborough East	Lib	Lib	1,265	59.11%	390	18.22%	71.04%	1,265	875	–	–	–	–	2,140
Peterborough West	Con	Con	1,262	51.76%	86	3.53%	63.78%	1,176	1,262	–	–	–	–	2,438
Prescott	Con	Lib	1,292	50.63%	32	1.25%	73.22%	2,552 (Note: the incumbent Albert Peter Hagar, having won in an 1881 byelection, was the winning candidate)	–	–	–	–	–	2,552
Prince Edward	Lib	I-Lib	2,045	50.47%	38	0.94%	77.94%	2,007	–	–	2,045	–	–	4,052
Renfrew North	Lib	Lib	1,108	54.10%	168	8.20%	71.40%	1,108 (Note: Thomas Murray had won in Renfrew South in 1879, but had resigned his seat to unsuccessfully contest a federal seat in Pontiac in the 1878 election.)	940	–	–	–	–	2,048
Renfrew South	Lib	Lib	934	52.83%	100	5.66%	69.17%	934	834	–	–	–	–	1,768
Russell	Lib	Con	1,265	46.47%	322	11.83%	63.68%	959	1,265	–	–	–	498	2,722
Simcoe East	Lib	Lib	1,403	50.38%	21	0.75%	65.70%	1,403	1,382	–	–	–	–	2,785
Simcoe South	Con	Con	1,214	53.72%	168	7.43%	66.99%	1,046	1,214	–	–	–	–	2,260
Simcoe West	Con	Lib	1,699	50.52%	35	1.04%	64.51%	1,699	1,664	–	–	–	–	3,363
Stormont	Con	Con	1,145	56.21%	253	12.42%	74.67%	892	1,145	–	–	–	–	2,037
Toronto East	Con	Con	2,135	47.93%	124	2.78%	50.44%	2,011	2,135	308	–	–	–	4,454
Toronto West	Con	Con	2,634	52.05%	207	4.09%	44.83%	–	2,634	2,427	–	–	–	5,061
Victoria North	Lib	Con	1,189	55.95%	253	11.91%	71.16%	936	1,189	–	–	–	–	2,125
Victoria South	Lib	Lib	1,609	50.55%	35	1.10%	72.40%	1,609	1,574	–	–	–	–	3,183
Waterloo North	Lib	Lib	1,569	65.16%	730	30.32%	61.85%	1,569	839	–	–	–	–	2,408
Waterloo South	Lib	Lib	1,606	51.16%	73	2.33%	73.03%	1,606	1,533	–	–	–	–	3,139
Welland	Con	Lib	2,070	50.67%	55	1.35%	67.82%	2,070	2,015	–	–	–	–	4,085
Wellington Centre	Lib	Lib	1,569	59.89%	518	19.77%	58.83%	1,569	1,051	–	–	–	–	2,620
Wellington South	Lib	Lib	1,348	50.62%	33	1.24%	68.02%	1,348	1,315	–	–	–	–	2,663
Wellington West	Lib	Lib	2,103	56.28%	469	12.55%	64.73%	2,103	1,634	–	–	–	–	3,737
Wentworth North	Lib	Lib	1,430	52.77%	150	5.54%	72.14%	1,430	1,280	–	–	–	–	2,710
Wentworth South	Con	Lib	1,410	50.50%	28	1.00%	76.12%	1,410	1,382 (Note: Franklin Metcalfe Carpenter had previously won in 1879, but his election was overturned on petition to the court.)	–	–	–	–	2,792
York East	Lib	Lib	2,022	53.20%	243	6.39%	71.39%	2,022	1,779	–	–	–	–	3,801
York North	Lib	Lib	2,328	61.23%	854	22.46%	66.79%	2,328	1,474	–	–	–	–	3,802
York West	Lib	Con	1,553	50.50%	31	1.01%	66.33%	1,522	1,553	–	–	–	–	3,075

= open seat
= turnout is above provincial average
= winning candidate was in previous Legislature
= incumbent had switched allegiance
= previously incumbent in another riding
= not incumbent; was previously elected to the Legislature
= incumbency arose from byelection gain
= incumbency arose from prior election result being overturned by the court
= other incumbents renominated
= previously an MP in the House of Commons of Canada
= multiple candidates

=== Analysis ===
Party candidates in 2nd place
Party in 1st place	Party in 2nd place						Total
Party in 1st place	Accl	Lib	Con	I-Con	Lab	Ind	Total
Liberal	4	1	42	1			48
Conservative	1	32	1	1	1	1	37
Independent Liberal		2					2
Independent		1					1
Total	5	36	43	2	1	1	88

Candidates ranked 1st to 5th place, by party
Parties	Accl	1st	2nd	3rd	4th	5th
█ Liberal	4	44	36	1	2	
█ Conservative	1	36	43			
█ Independent Liberal		2	1			
█ Independent		1	1	3	2	1
█ Independent Conservative			2	2		
█ Labour			1	2		

Resulting composition of the 2nd Legislative Assembly of Ontario
Source		Party				
Source		Lib	Con	I-Lib	Ind	Total
Seats retained	Incumbents returned	32	13			45
Seats retained	Returned by acclamation	4	1			5
Seats retained	Open seats held	3	6			9
Seats retained	Byelection loss reversed	1				1
Seats retained	Ouster of incumbent changing allegiance		1			1
Seats changing hands	Incumbents defeated	1	14	1		16
Seats changing hands	Open seats gained	3	2	1		6
Seats changing hands	Byelection gains held	3				3
Seats changing hands	Incumbent changing allegiance				1	1
Seats changing hands	Retention of seat overturned in previous election	1				1
Total		48	37	2	1	88

=== MLAs elected by region and riding ===
Party designations are as follows:

Liberal
Conservative
Independent Liberal
Independent

Northern Ontario

- Algoma: Robert Adam Lyon

Ottawa Valley

- Carleton: George William Monk
- Lanark North: William Clyde Caldwell
- Lanark South: William Lees (Ind)
- Ottawa: Patrick Baskerville
- Prescott: Albert Peter Hagar
- Renfrew North: Thomas Murray
- Renfrew South: John Francis Dowling (Note: Election declared void because of corrupt practices. Writ for new election issued. Dowling was returned in the subsequent byelection.)
- Russell: Honoré Robillard

Saint Lawrence Valley

- Brockville: Christopher Finlay Fraser
- Cornwall: Alexander Peter Ross
- Dundas: Andrew Broder
- Glengarry: James Rayside
- Grenville South: Frederick John French
- Kingston: James Henry Metcalfe
- Leeds North and Grenville North: Henry Merrick
- Leeds South: Robert Henry Preston
- Stormont: Joseph Kerr

Central Ontario

- Addington: George Denison
- Durham East: Charles Herbert Brereton
- Durham West: James Wellington McLaughlin
- Frontenac: Henry Wilmot
- Hastings East: William Parker Hudson
- Hastings North: Alpheus Field Wood
- Hastings West: Ephraim George Sills
- Lennox: Alexander Hall Roe
- Northumberland East: James Marshall Ferris
- Northumberland West: Robert Mulholland
- Peterborough East: Thomas Blezard
- Peterborough West: John Carnegie
- Prince Edward: James Hart (I-Lib)
- Victoria North: John Fell
- Victoria South: Duncan John McIntyre

Georgian Bay

- Bruce North: John Gillies (I-Lib)
- Grey North: David Creighton
- Muskoka and Parry Sound: Frederick G. Fauquier (Note: Election declared void because of corrupt practices. Writ for new election issued after appeal dismissed. Jacob William Dill (Liberal) won the subsequent byelection.)
- Simcoe East: Charles Alfred Drury
- Simcoe South: George Prevost McKay
- Simcoe West: Orson James Phelps (Note: Election declared void because of corrupt practices. Writ for new election issued. Phelps was returned in the subsequent byelection.)

Wentworth/Halton/Niagara

- Halton: William Kerns
- Hamilton: John Morison Gibson
- Lincoln: Sylvester Neelon
- Monck: Richard Harcourt
- Welland: James E. Morin
- Wentworth North: James McMahon
- Wentworth South: Nicholas Awrey

Midwestern Ontario

- Brant North: James Young
- Brant South: Arthur Sturgis Hardy
- Bruce South: Hamilton Parke O'Connor
- Dufferin: Robert McGhee
- Grey East: Abram William Lauder
- Grey South: John Blythe
- Haldimand: Jacob Baxter
- Huron East: Thomas Gibson
- Huron South: Archibald Bishop
- Huron West: Alexander McLagan Ross
- Norfolk North: John Bailey Freeman
- Norfolk South: William Morgan
- Oxford North: Oliver Mowat
- Oxford South: Adam Crooks
- Perth North: John George Hess
- Perth South: Thomas Ballantyne
- Waterloo North: Elias Weber Bingeman Snider
- Waterloo South: Isaac Master
- Wellington Centre: Charles Clarke
- Wellington South: James Laidlaw
- Wellington West: Robert McKim

Southwestern Ontario

- Elgin East: Charles Oaks Ermatinger
- Elgin West: John Cascaden
- Essex North: Solomon White
- Essex South: William Douglas Balfour
- Kent East: Daniel McCraney
- Kent West: James Clancy
- Lambton East: Peter Graham
- Lambton West: Timothy Blair Pardee
- London: William Ralph Meredith
- Middlesex East: Donald MacKenzie
- Middlesex North: John Waters
- Middlesex West: Alexander Johnston (Note: Election declared void because of corrupt practices. Writ for new election issued. George William Ross (Liberal) won the subsequent byelection.)

Peel/York/Ontario

- Cardwell: William Henry Hammell (Note: Election declared void because of corrupt practices. Writ for new election issued. Hammell was returned in the subsequent byelection.)
- Ontario North: Isaac James Gould
- Ontario South: John Dryden
- Peel: Kenneth Chisholm
- Toronto East: Alexander Morris
- Toronto West: Henry Edward Clarke
- York East: George Badgerow
- York North: Joseph Henry Widdifield
- York West: John Gray

== See also ==
- Politics of Ontario
- List of Ontario political parties
- Premier of Ontario
- Leader of the Opposition (Ontario)
