= Hardy ministry =

Cabinet of Ontario, 1896–1899

- 4th ministry of Ontario

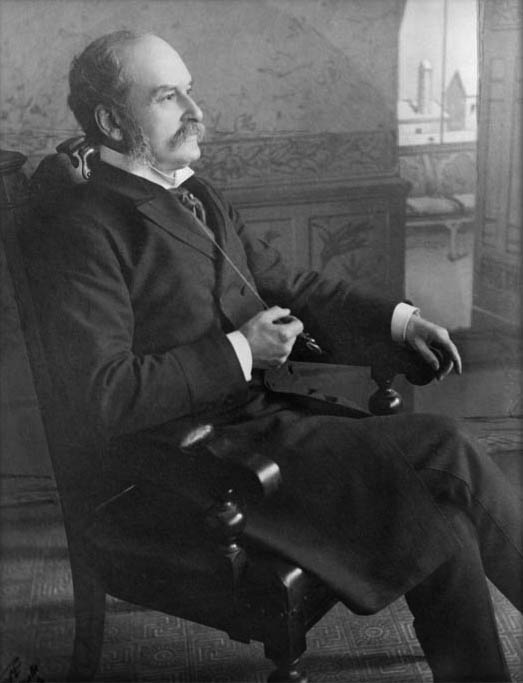
- Arthur Sturgis Hardy, c. 1900
- Date formed: July 21, 1896
- Date dissolved: October 21, 1899

People and organisations
- Monarch: Victoria
- Lieutenant Governor: George Airey Kirkpatrick (1896); Casimir Gzowski (1896-97); Oliver Mowat (1897-99)
- Premier: Arthur Sturgis Hardy
- Member party: Liberal Party
- Status in legislature: Majority
- Opposition party: Conservative
- Opposition leader: James Whitney

History
- Incoming formation: resignation of Mowat
- Outgoing formation: resignation of Hardy
- Election: 1898
- Legislature term: 8th Parliament of Ontario 9th Parliament of Ontario
- Predecessor: Mowat ministry
- Successor: Ross ministry

The Hardy ministry was the cabinet of the Government of Ontario (formally the Executive Council of Ontario) that was in office from July 21, 1896, to October 21, 1899. It was led by the 4th Premier of Ontario, Arthur Sturgis Hardy. The ministry was made up of members of the Liberal Party of Ontario.

The ministry inherited its majority governing mandate in the 8th Ontario Parliament from the Mowat ministry, following the resignation of Premier Oliver Mowat after twenty-four years of service to serve as the Ontario lieutenant in Prime Minister Wilfrid Laurier's federal cabinet. The ministry renewed its governing mandate in the 1898 general election, winning the party's eighth consecutive majority mandate, and governed through part of the 9th Parliament of Ontario. Premier Hardy retired a year after, and was succeeded as Premier of Ontario by George William Ross.

== List of ministers ==
Hardy ministry by portfolio
Portfolio	Minister	Tenure	
Portfolio	Minister	Start	End
Premier & President of the Council	Arthur Sturgis Hardy	July 21, 1896	October 21, 1899
Attorney General	Arthur Sturgis Hardy	July 21, 1896	October 21, 1899
Treasurer	Richard Harcourt	July 21, 1896	October 21, 1899
Provincial Secretary and Registrar	William Balfour	July 21, 1896	August 19, 1896 (Note: Died in office)
Provincial Secretary and Registrar	Elihu Davis	August 28, 1896	October 21, 1899
Commissioner of Crown Lands	John Morison Gibson	July 21, 1896	October 21, 1899
Minister of Agriculture	John Dryden	July 21, 1896	October 21, 1899
Commissioner of Public Works	William Harty	July 21, 1896	October 21, 1899
Minister of Education	George William Ross	July 21, 1896	October 21, 1899
Ministers without portfolio	Erskine Henry Bronson	July 21, 1896	December 16, 1898
Ministers without portfolio	James Thompson Garrow	December 16, 1898	October 21, 1899

== Notes & References ==
- Froman, Debra, ed. (1984). "Executive Councils of Ontario". Legislators and Legislatures of Ontario: A Reference Guide. Vol. 1. Legislative Library, Legislative Assembly of Ontario. pp. xxxi.
- "All Members". Legislative Assembly of Ontario.
