= Ross ministry =

Cabinet of Ontario, 1896–1899

- 5th ministry of Ontario

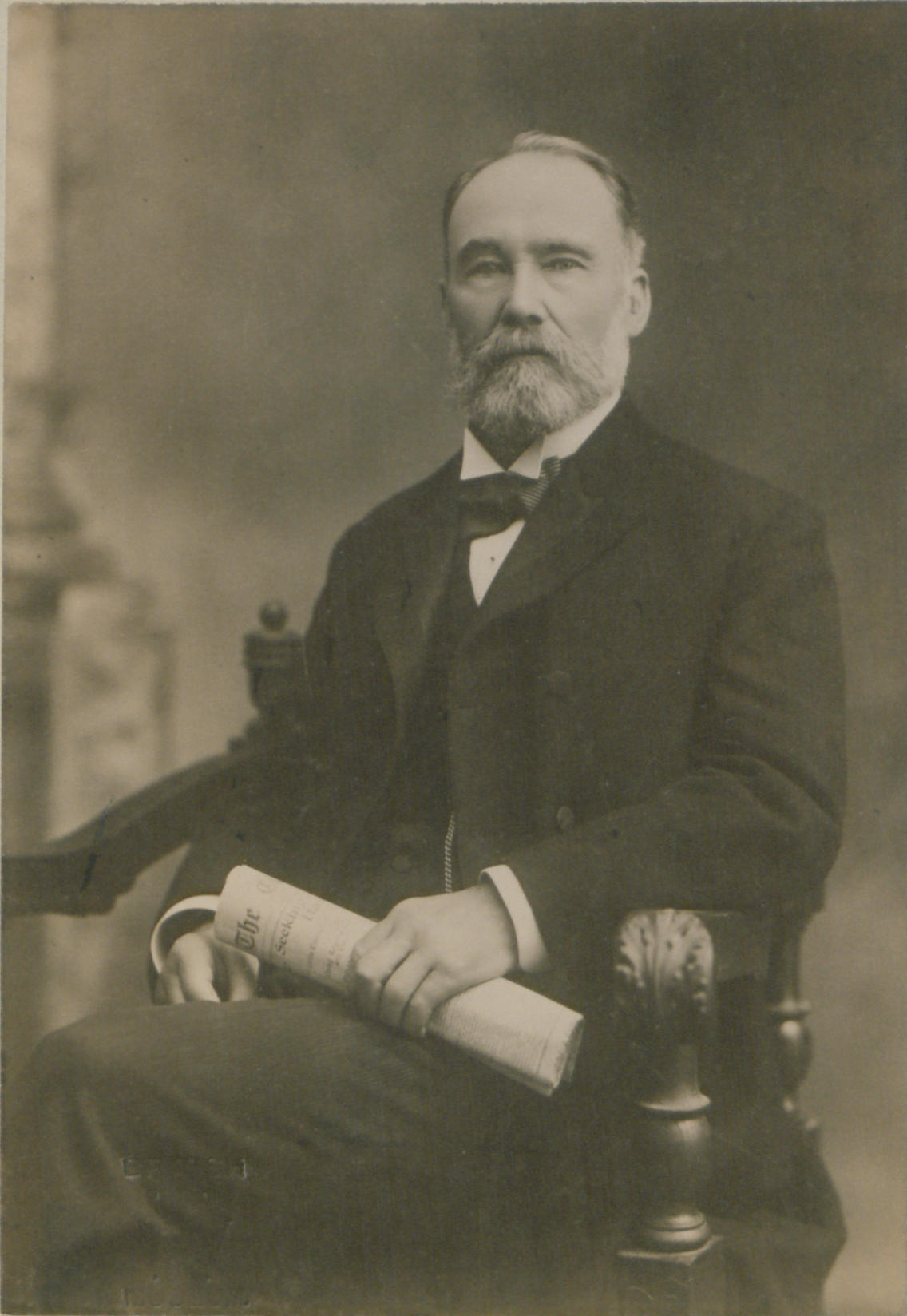
- The Hon. Sir George William Ross
- Date formed: October 21, 1899
- Date dissolved: February 8, 1905

People and organisations
- Monarch: Victoria
- Lieutenant Governor: Oliver Mowat (1899-1903); William Mortimer Clark (1903-1905)
- Premier: George William Ross
- Member party: Liberal Party
- Status in legislature: Majority
- Opposition party: Conservative
- Opposition leader: James Whitney

History
- Elections: 1902, 1905
- Legislature term: 9th Parliament of Ontario 10th Parliament of Ontario
- Incoming formation: resignation of Hardy
- Outgoing formation: 1905 Ontario general election
- Predecessor: Hardy ministry
- Successor: Whitney ministry

The Ross ministry was the combined cabinet (formally the Executive Council of Ontario) that governed Ontario from October 21, 1899, to February 8, 1905. It was led by the 5th Premier of Ontario, George William Ross. The ministry was made up of members of the Liberal Party of Ontario, which commanded a majority of the seats in the Legislative Assembly of Ontario.

The ministry replaced the Hardy ministry following the resignation of Premier Arthur Sturgis Hardy in 1899. The Ross ministry governed through most of the 9th Parliament of Ontario, as well as all of the 10th Parliament of Ontario.

On June 26, 1903, the Legislature of Ontario voted to censure Conservative Robert R. Gamey, who had charged that the Ross ministry, led by provincial secretary James Robert Stratton, had offered him a $3,000 bribe to desert his party.

Ross lost the 1905 Ontario general election and the resignation of the ministry took place on February 7, 1905. He was succeeded as Premier of Ontario by James Whitney. The Liberals were not returned to office until 29 years later.

== List of ministers ==
Ross ministry by portfolio
Portfolio	Minister	Tenure	
Portfolio	Minister	Start	End
Premier of Ontario	George William Ross	October 21, 1899	February 8, 1905
Minister of Agriculture	John Dryden	October 21, 1899	February 8, 1905
Attorney General	John Morison Gibson	October 21, 1899	November 22, 1904
Attorney General	Francis Robert Latchford	November 22, 1904	February 8, 1905
Minister of Education	Richard Harcourt	October 21, 1899	February 8, 1905
Commissioner of Crown Lands	Elihu Davis	October 21, 1899	November 22, 1904
Commissioner of Crown Lands	Alexander Grant MacKay	November 22, 1904	February 8, 1905
Commissioner of Public Works	Francis Robert Latchford	October 21, 1899	November 22, 1904
Commissioner of Public Works	William Andrew Charlton	November 22, 1904	February 8, 1905
Provincial Secretary and Registrar	James Robert Stratton	October 21, 1899	November 22, 1904
Provincial Secretary and Registrar	George Perry Graham	November 22, 1904	February 8, 1905
Treasurer	George William Ross	October 21, 1899	February 8, 1905
