= Agricultural Research and Innovation Ontario =

Canadian Crown corporation

Agency overview
- Formed: 1962; 64 years ago
- Superseding agency: Agricultural Research Institute of Ontario
- Type: Crown corporation
- Jurisdiction: Government of Ontario
- Headquarters: 1 Stone Road West, Guelph, Ontario, Canada; 43°31′30.69″N 80°13′43.42″W
- Employees: 15
- Minister responsible: Lisa Thompson, Minister of Agriculture, Food and Rural Affairs
- Agency executive: Karen Chan, Director of Research
- Parent department: Ontario Ministry of Agriculture, Food and Rural Affairs
- Website: Official website

Agricultural Research and Innovation Ontario (ARIO Recherche et innovation agricoles Ontario), is a provincial Crown agency of the Government of Ontario that supports agricultural research, innovation, and knowledge transfer in the province's agrifood sector.

Established in 1962 as the Agricultural Research Institute of Ontario (Institut de recherche agricole de l'Ontario), the agency amanages agricultural research priorities and infrastructure through partnerships with government, industry, and academic institutions. It was renamed in 2024 following amendments to the Agricultural Research Institute of Ontario Act that expanded its mandate to emphasize innovation, commercialization, and strategic collaboration.

ARIO is headquartered in Guelph, Ontario, and maintains a longstanding partnership with the University of Guelph through the Ontario Agri-Food Innovation Alliance.

== Indigenous engagement initiatives ==
In 2024–2025, Indigenous engagement initiatives encouraged relationship-building with Indigenous communities and organizations, board education on Indigenous-led research, implementation of land acknowledgements at research facilities, and support for research and knowledge co-developed with Indigenous researchers and communities, particularly through Northern Ontario agricultural research programs.
