= Malcolm Graeme Cameron =

Canadian lawyer & politician (1857–1925)

Malcolm Cameron

Ontario MPP
- In office 1902–1908
- Preceded by: James Thompson Garrow
- Succeeded by: Riding abolished
- Constituency: Huron West

Personal details
- Born: February 24, 1857 Goderich, Canada West
- Died: August 10, 1925 (aged 68) Goderich, Ontario
- Party: Liberal
- Occupation: Lawyer

Malcolm Graeme Cameron, KC (February 24, 1857 – August 10, 1925) was a lawyer and politician in Ontario, Canada. He represented Huron West in the Legislative Assembly of Ontario from 1902 to 1908 as a Liberal.

The son of Malcolm Colin Cameron and Jessie H. McLean, he was born in Goderich, Canada West, and was educated there. Cameron served on the town council for Goderich, also serving as reeve and as mayor. He was named a King's Counsel in 1902. He ran unsuccessfully for the Huron West seat in the Canadian House of Commons in 1911.

Cameron published A Treatise on the Law of Dower in 1882.
