= Foodland Ontario =

Logo of Foodland Ontario

Foodland Ontario, founded in 1977, is a consumer promotion program for the government of Ontario. Foodland Ontario currently falls under the administration of the Ministry of Agriculture, Food and Rural Affairs in Ontario. Through market research, advertising campaigns, working with local farmers and reaching out to retail locations, Foodland Ontario's mission is to "spread the word about the great taste, nutrition and economic benefits of buying Ontario food to all people in Ontario".

== General ==
Foodland Ontario promotes produce (fruits and vegetables), meats, dairy products, honey and maple syrup, and processed foods made with Ontario grown food products.

Foodland Ontario is a long-established consumer promotion program of the Ontario Ministry of Agriculture, Food and Rural Affairs. From its inception in 1977, Foodland Ontario has partnered with producers to achieve the maximum penetration of the Ontario market by Ontario-produced fresh and processed agricultural products.

One of the main objectives of the program is to maintain consumer intent to purchase (Ontario) over 80%, thereby assisting Ontario producers to maximize their market share.

To achieve its market objective, Foodland communicates the benefits (economic and product characteristics) of Ontario food, encourages the purchase of Ontario food, co-ordinates promotion and research activities with producer organizations and industry stakeholders, and promotes the Ontario "brand." The target group for these strategies are the primary and secondary food purchasers in Ontario.

During the life of the Foodland program, the target market has evolved from the "principal grocery shopper" – mothers 25 to 49 years, to adults 25 to 64 years. The latter definition includes both males and females and reflects recent research that food buying is a shared activity – many households have two "principal grocery shoppers."

== Advertising ==
The program includes advertising campaigns that are designed to increase interest in, and demand for Ontario foods in the age 24-59 demographic.

There are two slogans used as part of the Foodland Ontario program. The slogan and musical jingle "Good Things Grow in Ontario" was introduced with the Foodland Ontario logo in 1977. The second slogan "Ontario... There's No Taste Like Home" was introduced in 1986 to promote the connection between local food and Ontarian values such as family, community, trust and support.

According to the Ministry of Agriculture, Food and Rural Affairs, Foodland Ontario commercials reach more than 90% of the target audience including television, radio, billboard and print media campaigns. Food retailers such as grocery stores and farmer's markets display the logo to promote Ontario foods and capture niche markets for products such as health food. In 2011–12, over 700,000 copies of Foodland calendars and 250,000 copies of two Foodland cookbooks were distributed across the province.

== Retailer awards ==
Foodland Ontario offers a Retailer Awards Program that is designed to encourage vendors to display and promote Ontario foods. Different categories award retailers for different levels of merchandising including awards for seasonal displays, creative displays, cross-merchandised displays, and continued merchandising over set periods of time. Displays must be well stocked, clearly visible, have customer impact, and result in sales increases.
