= Huron West (provincial electoral district) =

Provincial electoral district in Ontario, Canada

Ontario electoral district

Defunct provincial electoral district
- Legislature: Legislative Assembly of Ontario
- District created: 1875
- District abolished: 1908
- First contested: 1875
- Last contested: 1905

Huron West was a provincial electoral district in Ontario, Canada. It existed from 1875 to 1908 and consisted of the western areas of Huron County.

It was consistently represented by Liberals.

== Members of Provincial Parliament ==
Huron West
Assembly	Years	Member	Party
Riding created from Huron North
3rd	1875–1879	Alexander Ross	Liberal
4th	1879–1883	Alexander Ross	Liberal
5th	1883–1886	Alexander Ross	Liberal
6th	1886–1890	Alexander Ross	Liberal
7th	1890–1894	James Thompson Garrow	Liberal
8th	1894–1898	James Thompson Garrow	Liberal
9th	1898–1902	James Thompson Garrow	Liberal
10th	1902–1905	Malcolm Graeme Cameron	Liberal
11th	1805–1908	Malcolm Graeme Cameron	Liberal
Riding dissolved into Huron North and Huron Centre

== Election results ==
1905 Ontario general election
Party	Candidate	Votes	%	±%
Liberal	Malcolm Graeme Cameron	2,435	50.02	–0.19
Conservative	D. Holmes	2,433	49.98	+0.19
Total valid votes		4,868	100.00	
Total rejected ballots		–		
Turnout		4,868	83.44	+2.60
Eligible voters		5,834		
Liberal hold		Swing		–0.19
Source: Elections Ontario

1902 Ontario general election
Party	Candidate	Votes	%	±%
Liberal	Malcolm Graeme Cameron	2,458	50.21	–2.69
Conservative	James Mitchell	2,437	49.79	+2.69
Total valid votes		4,895	99.49	
Total rejected ballots		25	0.51	+0.27
Turnout		4,920	80.84	–2.85
Eligible voters		6,086		
Liberal hold		Swing		–2.69
Source: Elections Ontario

Ontario provincial by-election, December 4, 1901 Void election
Party	Candidate	Votes	%	±%
Liberal	James Thompson Garrow	2,638	52.91	+2.45
Conservative	Joseph Beck	2,348	47.09	–2.45
Total valid votes		4,986	99.76	
Total rejected ballots		12	0.24	+0.24
Turnout		4,998	83.69	–
Eligible voters		5,972		
Liberal hold		Swing		+2.45
Source: Elections Ontario

Ontario provincial by-election, December 8, 1898 Void election
Party	Candidate	Votes	%	±%
Liberal	James Thompson Garrow	2,502	50.45	+0.44
Conservative	Joseph Beck	2,457	49.55	–0.44
Total valid votes		4,959	100.00	
Total rejected ballots		–		
Turnout		4,959	–	–
Eligible voters				
Liberal hold		Swing		+0.44
Source: Elections Ontario

1898 Ontario general election
Party	Candidate	Votes	%	±%
Liberal	James Thompson Garrow	2,465	50.01	–0.84
Conservative	Joseph Beck	2,464	49.99	–
Total valid votes		4,929	100.00	
Total rejected ballots		–		
Turnout		4,929	73.71	+0.32
Eligible voters		6,687		
Liberal hold		Swing		–0.42
Source: Elections Ontario

1894 Ontario general election
Party	Candidate	Votes	%	±%
Liberal	James Thompson Garrow	2,263	50.85	–0.50
Conservative-Patron	James Connelly	2,187	49.15	–
Total valid votes		4,450	99.53	
Total rejected ballots		21	0.47	–0.11
Turnout		4,471	73.39	+8.79
Eligible voters		6,092		
Liberal hold		Swing		–0.25
Source: Elections Ontario

1890 Ontario general election
Party	Candidate	Votes	%	±%
Liberal	James Thompson Garrow	2,125	51.35	–2.49
Conservative	J. M. Roberts	2,013	48.65	+2.49
Total valid votes		4,138	99.42	
Total rejected ballots		24	0.58	+0.10
Turnout		4,162	64.60	–3.65
Eligible voters		6,443		
Liberal hold		Swing		–2.49
Source: Elections Ontario

1886 Ontario general election
Party	Candidate	Votes	%	±%
Liberal	Alexander Ross	2,358	53.85	+1.74
Conservative	A. Taylor	2,021	46.15	–1.74
Total valid votes		4,379	99.52	
Total rejected ballots		21	0.48	–
Turnout		4,400	68.25	–
Eligible voters		6,447		
Liberal hold		Swing		+1.74
Source: Elections Ontario

Ontario provincial by-election, November 16, 1883 Ministerial By-election, Provincial Treasurer and Commissioner of Agriculture
Party	Candidate	Votes
Liberal	Alexander Ross	acclaimed
Source: Elections Ontario

1883 Ontario general election
Party	Candidate	Votes	%	±%
Liberal	Alexander Ross	2,061	52.11	–3.46
Conservative	Mr. Johnston	1,894	47.89	+3.46
Total valid votes		3,955	98.95	
Total rejected ballots		42	1.05	+1.05
Turnout		3,997	67.56	+4.86
Eligible voters		5,916		
Liberal hold		Swing		–3.46
Source: Elections Ontario

1879 Ontario general election
Party	Candidate	Votes	%	±%
Liberal	Alexander Ross	2,064	55.57	+4.09
Conservative	P. Kelly	1,650	44.43	−4.09
Total valid votes		3,714	62.70	−5.88
Eligible voters		5,923		
Liberal hold		Swing		+4.09
Source: Elections Ontario

1875 Ontario general election
Party	Candidate	Votes	%
Liberal	Alexander Ross	1,595	51.48
Conservative	J. Davison	1,503	48.52
Turnout		3,098	68.59
Eligible voters		4,517	
Liberal pickup new district.			
Source: Elections Ontario

== See also ==
- List of Ontario provincial electoral districts
- Canadian provincial electoral districts
