= Ministry of Agriculture, Food and Agribusiness =

Canadian provincial ministry in Ontario

- French: Ministère de l’Agriculture, de l’Alimentation et de l’Agroentreprise
- Government of Ontario wordmark

Agency overview
- Formed: March 9, 1994
- Preceding agency: Ministry of Agriculture, Food and Rural Affairs
- Type: Government ministry
- Jurisdiction: Government of Ontario
- Headquarters: 1 Stone Road West Guelph, Ontario N1G 4Y2
- Minister responsible: Trevor Jones, Minister of Agriculture, Food and Agribusiness
- Key document: Ministry of Agriculture, Food and Rural Affairs Act
- Website: ontario.ca/page/ministry-agriculture-food-and-agribusiness

The Ministry of Agriculture, Food and Agribusiness is a ministry of the Government of Ontario responsible for the food, agriculture and agribusiness sectors of the Canadian province of Ontario. The Minister responsible is Trevor Jones.

== Foodland Ontario ==
Foodland Ontario was founded in 1977 as a consumer promotion program for the agricultural products in Ontario. Foodland Ontario is administrated by the Ministry of Agriculture, Food, and Agribusiness. Foodland Ontario's mandate states their goal is to "spread the word about the great taste, nutrition and economic benefits of buying Ontario food to all people in Ontario".

According to the Ministry, Foodland Ontario commercials such as the "Good things grow in Ontario" campaign reach more than 90% of the target audience including television, radio, billboard and print media campaigns. Food retailers such as grocery stores and farmer's markets display the logo to promote Ontario foods and capture niche markets for products such as health food. In 2011–12, over 700,000 copies of Foodland calendars and 250,000 copies of two Foodland cookbooks were distributed across the province.

== Ministry agencies ==
The Ministry is responsible for the following agencies, boards and commissions:

- Agricorp
- Agricultural Research Institute of Ontario
- Agriculture, Food and Rural Affairs Appeal Tribunal
- Business Risk Management Review Committee
- Grain Financial Protection Board
- Livestock Financial Protection Board
- Livestock Medicines Advisory Committee
- Normal Farm Practices Protection Board
- Ontario Farm Products Marketing Commission
- Ontario Food Terminal Board

== Organization history ==
Prior to confederation, the Bureau of Agriculture of the Province of Canada was responsible for collecting facts and statistics relating to the agricultural, mechanical and manufacturing interests.

Under the terms of the British North America Act 1867, the Lieutenant Governor of Ontario was empowered to appoint, as one of the executive officers of the government, a Commissioner of Agriculture and Public Works.

On March 4, 1868, the Act for the Encouragement of Agriculture, Horticulture, Arts, and Manufactures received royal assent, establishing the Department of the Commissioner of Agriculture and Public Works. The Commissioner was referred to simply as the Commissioner of Agriculture and Arts when dealing with matters relating to arts and agriculture, and as the Commissioner of Public Works, when dealing with matters relating to public works. However, a separate Department of Public Works was established in 1869, taking over the public works functions. However, one individual continued to be commissioner for both portfolios until 1874.

The agricultural and arts functions of the department were carried out by the Commissioner through the Bureau of Agriculture and Arts. "Arts", at the time, referred to the practical application of an industrial, manufacturing, or scientific pursuit, rather than to its current meaning. Additionally, a variety of both agricultural and arts-related agencies were required to report to the commissioner, and to provide statistical information to the bureau. The department also had responsibility over immigration between 1869 and 1874. In 1874, a separate Commissioner for the Department of Public Works was created.

In 1877, the Department of the Commissioner of Agriculture and Arts was formally established. The Commissioner acted as head of the Bureau of Agriculture and Arts from 1877 until 1882, as well as the Bureau of Industries, which replaced the Bureau of Agriculture and Arts, from 1882 until 1888.

In 1880, the "arts" related responsibilities of the Commissioner, and the bureau, were transferred to the Department of Education. The name of the department, however, remained the Department of the Commissioner of Agriculture and Arts until 1888.

In 1888, the department was renamed the Department of Agriculture. With this change, the head of the department was renamed to the Minister of Agriculture, with cabinet standing. Prior to the First World War, the department were responsible for a wide range of functions including the Office of the Registrar General (until 1891); the Clerk of Forestry (until 1895); the Inspector of Factories (until 1915); the Inspector of Mines (until 1891); and the Provincial Inspector in Road-making (until 1900). After the First World War, the department's function became increasingly more focused in the regulation and promotion of agricultural activities. The department was briefly responsible for telephone services between 1960 and 1971.

In 1966, the department was renamed the Department of Agriculture and Food. By this time, rural development has emerged distinctly as an area of focus. With the reorganization of the government in 1972, the department was renamed the Ministry of Agriculture and Food. In 1994, the Ministry of Agriculture and Food was renamed the Ministry of Agriculture, Food and Rural Affairs.

=== List of ministers ===
Name	Term of office		Tenure	Political party (Ministry)	Note
Commissioner of Agriculture and Public Works				Liberal Conservative (MacDonald)	
John Carling	July 16, 1867	December 20, 1871	4 years, 157 days	Liberal Conservative (MacDonald)	Carling later served as federal Minister of Agriculture between 1885 and 1891 under Prime Ministers Macdonald and Abbott.
Archibald McKellar	December 20, 1871	October 25, 1872	3 years, 215 days	Liberal (Blake)	
Archibald McKellar	October 25, 1872	March 24, 1874	3 years, 215 days	Liberal (Mowat)	
Commissioner of Agriculture			3 years, 215 days	Liberal (Mowat)	
Archibald McKellar	March 24, 1874	July 23, 1875	3 years, 215 days	Liberal (Mowat)	Concurrently Provincial Secretary and Registrar (April 4, 1874 – July 23, 1875)
Samuel Casey Wood	July 23, 1875	June 2, 1883	7 years, 314 days	Liberal (Mowat)	Concurrently Provincial Secretary and Registrar (July 23, 1875 – March 19, 1877), Treasurer (March 19, 1877 – June 2, 1883)
James Young	June 2, 1883	November 2, 1883	153 days	Liberal (Mowat)	Concurrently Treasurer
Alexander McLagan Ross	November 2, 1883	May 1, 1888	4 years, 181 days	Liberal (Mowat)	Concurrently Treasurer
Charles Alfred Drury	May 1, 1888	September 16, 1890	2 years, 138 days	Liberal (Mowat)	Styled as Minister of Agriculture with cabinet status
Minister of Agriculture				Liberal (Mowat)	
John Dryden	September 16, 1890	July 21, 1896	14 years, 145 days	Liberal (Mowat)	
John Dryden	July 21, 1896	October 21, 1899	14 years, 145 days	Liberal (Hardy)	
John Dryden	October 21, 1899	February 8, 1905	14 years, 145 days	Liberal (Ross)	
Samuel Nelson Monteith	February 8, 1905	October 6, 1908	3 years, 241 days	Conservative (Whitney)	
James Stoddart Duff	October 6, 1908	September 25, 1914	8 years, 42 days	Conservative (Whitney)	
James Stoddart Duff	September 25, 1914	November 17, 1916	8 years, 42 days	Conservative (Hearst)	Died in office
William Hearst	December 19, 1916	May 23, 1918	1 year, 155 days	Conservative (Hearst)	Concurrently Premier
George Stewart Henry	May 23, 1918	November 14, 1919	1 year, 175 days	Conservative (Hearst)	
Manning Doherty	November 14, 1919	July 16, 1923	3 years, 244 days	United Farmers (Drury)	
John Strickler Martin	July 16, 1923	September 16, 1930	7 years, 62 days	Conservative (Ferguson)	
Thomas Laird Kennedy	September 16, 1930	December 15, 1930	3 years, 297 days (first instance)	Conservative (Ferguson)	
Thomas Laird Kennedy	December 15, 1930	July 10, 1934	3 years, 297 days (first instance)	Conservative (Henry)	
Duncan Marshall	July 10, 1934	October 12, 1937	3 years, 94 days	Liberal (Hepburn)	
Patrick Michael Dewan	October 12, 1937	October 21, 1942	5 years, 309 days	Liberal (Hepburn)	
Patrick Michael Dewan	October 21, 1942	May 18, 1943	5 years, 309 days	Liberal (Conant)	
Patrick Michael Dewan	May 18, 1943	August 17, 1943	5 years, 309 days	Liberal (Nixon)	
Thomas Laird Kennedy	August 17, 1943	October 19, 1948	9 years, 156 days (second instance); 13 years, 88 days in total	PC (Drew)	
Thomas Laird Kennedy	October 19, 1948	May 4, 1949	9 years, 156 days (second instance); 13 years, 88 days in total	PC (Kennedy)	Concurrently Premier
Thomas Laird Kennedy	May 4, 1949	January 20, 1953	9 years, 156 days (second instance); 13 years, 88 days in total	PC (Frost)	
Fletcher Stewart Thomas	January 20, 1953	August 1, 1956	3 years, 194 days	PC (Frost)	
William Arthur Goodfellow	August 1, 1956	November 8, 1961	5 years, 99 days	PC (Frost)	
William Atcheson Stewart	November 8, 1961	May 18, 1966	13 years, 333 days	PC (Robarts)	
Minister of Agriculture and Food			13 years, 333 days	PC (Robarts)	
William Atcheson Stewart	May 18, 1966	March 1, 1971	13 years, 333 days	PC (Robarts)	
William Atcheson Stewart	March 1, 1971	October 7, 1975	13 years, 333 days	PC (Davis)	
Bill Newman	October 7, 1975	August 30, 1979	3 years, 327 days	PC (Davis)	
Lorne Henderson	August 30, 1979	February 13, 1982	2 years, 167 days	PC (Davis)	
Dennis Timbrell	February 13, 1982	February 8, 1985	2 years, 361 days	PC (Davis)	
Philip Andrewes	February 8, 1985	May 17, 1985	98 days	PC (Miller)	
K. Ross Stevenson	May 17, 1985	June 26, 1985	40 days	PC (Miller)	
Jack Riddell	June 26, 1985	August 2, 1989	4 years, 37 days	Liberal (Peterson)	
David Ramsay	August 2, 1989	October 1, 1990	1 year, 60 days	Liberal (Peterson)	
Elmer Buchanan	October 1, 1990	March 9, 1994	4 years, 268 days	NDP (Rae)	
Minister of Agriculture, Food and Rural Affairs			4 years, 268 days	NDP (Rae)	
Elmer Buchanan	March 9, 1994	June 26, 1995	4 years, 268 days	NDP (Rae)	
Noble Villeneuve	June 26, 1995	June 17, 1999	3 years, 356 days	PC (Harris)	Concurrently Minister Responsible for Francophone Affairs
Ernie Hardeman	June 17, 1999	February 7, 2001	1 year, 235 days (first instance)	PC (Harris)	
Brian Coburn	February 8, 2001	April 14, 2002	1 year, 65 days	PC (Harris)	
Helen Johns	April 15, 2002	October 22, 2003	1 year, 190 days	PC (Eves)	
Steve Peters	October 23, 2003	June 29, 2005	1 year, 249 days	Liberal (McGuinty)	
Leona Dombrowsky	June 29, 2005	January 18, 2010	4 years, 203 days	Liberal (McGuinty)	
Carol Mitchell	January 18, 2010	October 20, 2011	1 year, 275 days	Liberal (McGuinty)	
Ted McMeekin	October 20, 2011	February 11, 2013	1 year, 114 days	Liberal (McGuinty)	
Minister of Agriculture and Food				Liberal (Wynne)	
Kathleen Wynne	February 11, 2013	June 24, 2014	1 year, 133 days	Liberal (Wynne)	Concurrently Premier. Jeff Leal is Minister of Rural Affairs for this period.
Minister of Agriculture, Food and Rural Affairs				Liberal (Wynne)	
Jeff Leal	June 24, 2014	June 29, 2018	4 years, 5 days	Liberal (Wynne)	Total tenure 5 years, 138 days including time as Minister of Rural Affairs.
Ernie Hardeman	June 29, 2018	June 17, 2021	2 years, 354 days (second instance)	PC (Ford)	
Lisa Thompson	June 18, 2021	August 4, 2024	2 years, 354 days	PC (Ford)	
Minister of Agriculture, Food and Agribusiness (Note: Rural Affairs split into separate ministry.)				PC (Ford)	
Rob Flack	June 6, 2024	March 19, 2025	286 days	PC (Ford)	
Trevor Jones	March 19, 2025	Incumbent	1 year, 197 days	PC (Ford)	
