= Ministry of Finance (Ontario) =

Canadian state ministry

- Ministère des finances (French)
- Government of Ontario wordmark

Government ministry overview
- Formed: 1867
- Jurisdiction: Government of Ontario
- Headquarters: 95 Grosvenor St Toronto, Ontario, Canada
- Ministers responsible: Peter Bethlenfalvy, Minister of Finance; Will Bouma, Parliamentary Assistant to the Minister of Finance
- Website: www.ontario.ca/page/ministry-finance

The Ministry of Finance (French: Ministère des Finances) is a ministry of the Government of Ontario responsible for managing the province's fiscal policy, developing the provincial budget, and financial sector regulation. The minister of finance – called the treasurer before 1993 – leads the ministry and is responsible to the Legislative Assembly of Ontario.

== History ==
For most of the period from 1867 until 1993, the minister was called the treasurer or provincial treasurer.

The ministry were renamed the Ministry of Economics in 1956 and the minister became known as Minister in charge of Economics instead of treasurer. From January to December 1961, the ministry became the Ministry of Economics and Federal and Provincial Relations. The title of treasurer was revived in December 1961 with the minister also often holding the secondary title of minister of economics or some variation after 1968. Frank Miller had the sole title of minister of economics from 1978 until 1981 when he was given the additional title of treasurer. At various times in the 1960s and 1970s the minister also held the titles of chairman of the management board of cabinet, chairman of the treasury board and/or minister of revenue. This practice was revived in recent years with Greg Sorbara acting as finance minister and chair of both the management board and the treasury board. It has ended as there is now a different person holding the position of chair of the management and treasury board.

In 1993, the positions of treasurer and minister of economics were formally combined and renamed the minister of finance.

In early 2007, Premier Dalton McGuinty split the province's revenue collection function from the Ministry of Finance and resurrected the Ministry of Revenue, a portfolio that had not been used since the Ontario New Democratic Party government of Bob Rae in 1993. Following the 2011 Ontario general election, the Ministry of Revenue was merged back into the Ministry of Finance.

== List of ministers ==
| Portrait | Name | Term of office | | Tenure | Political party (Ministry) | Note |
|---|---|---|---|---|---|---|
| Treasurer | | | | | | |
| | Edmund Burke Wood | July 20, 1867 | December 20, 1871 | 4 years, 153 days | Liberal Conservative (MacDonald) | |
| | Alexander Mackenzie | December 20, 1871 | October 25, 1872 | 310 days | Liberal (Blake) | |
| | Adam Crooks | October 25, 1872 | March 19, 1877 | 4 years, 145 days | Liberal (Mowat) | |
| | Samuel Wood | March 19, 1877 | June 2, 1883 | 6 years, 75 days | Liberal (Mowat) | Concurrently Commissioner of Agriculture |
| | James Young | June 2, 1883 | November 1, 1883 | 152 days | Liberal (Mowat) | Concurrently Commissioner of Agriculture |
| | Alexander Ross | November 2, 1883 | September 16, 1890 | 6 years, 318 days | Liberal (Mowat) | Concurrently Commissioner of Agriculture (November 2, 1883 - May 1, 1888) |
| | Richard Harcourt | September 16, 1890 | July 21, 1896 | 9 years, 35 days | Liberal (Mowat) | |
| | Richard Harcourt | July 21, 1896 | October 21, 1899 | 9 years, 35 days | Liberal (Hardy) | |
| | George William Ross | October 21, 1899 | February 8, 1905 | 5 years, 110 days | Liberal (Ross) | While Premier |
| | Arthur Matheson | February 8, 1905 | January 25, 1913 | 7 years, 352 days | Conservative (Whitney) | Died in office |
| | Isaac Lucas | January 25, 1913 | May 13, 1913 | 1 year, 331 days | Conservative (Whitney) | acting |
| | Isaac Lucas | May 13, 1913 | October 2, 1914 | 1 year, 331 days | Conservative (Whitney) | |
| | Isaac Lucas | October 2, 1914 | December 22, 1914 | 1 year, 331 days | Conservative (Hearst) | |
| | Thomas McGarry | December 22, 1914 | November 14, 1919 | 4 years, 327 days | Conservative (Hearst) | |
| | Peter Smith | November 14, 1919 | July 16, 1923 | 3 years, 244 days | United Farmers (Drury) | |
| | William Herbert Price | July 16, 1923 | October 18, 1926 | 3 years, 94 days | Conservative (Ferguson) | |
| | Joseph Monteith | October 18, 1926 | September 16, 1930 | 3 years, 333 days | Conservative (Ferguson) | |
| | Edward Arunah Dunlop | September 16, 1930 | December 15, 1930 | 3 years, 106 days | Conservative (Ferguson) | |
| | Edward Arunah Dunlop | December 15, 1930 | December 31, 1933 | 3 years, 106 days | Conservative (Henry) | |
| | George Stewart Henry | January 12, 1934 | July 10, 1934 | 179 days | Conservative (Henry) | While Premier |
| | Mitchell Hepburn | July 10, 1934 | October 21, 1942 | 8 years, 236 days | Liberal (Hepburn) | While Premier |
| | Mitchell Hepburn | October 21, 1942 | March 3, 1943 | 8 years, 236 days | Liberal (Conant) | |
| | Arthur Gordon | March 3, 1943 | May 18, 1943 | 167 days | Liberal (Conant) | |
| | Arthur Gordon | May 18, 1943 | August 17, 1943 | 167 days | Liberal (Nixon) | |
| | Leslie Frost | August 17, 1943 | October 19, 1948 | 12 years, 0 days (first instance) | PC (Drew) | Concurrently Minister of Mines |
| | Leslie Frost | October 19, 1948 | May 4, 1949 | 12 years, 0 days (first instance) | PC (Kennedy) | Concurrently Minister of Mines |
| | Leslie Frost | May 4, 1949 | August 17, 1955 | 12 years, 0 days (first instance) | PC (Frost) | While Premier |
| | Dana Porter | August 17, 1955 | March 28, 1956 | 2 years, 166 days | PC (Frost) | |
| Minister in Charge of the Department of Economics | | | | 2 years, 166 days | PC (Frost) | |
| | Dana Porter | March 28, 1956 | January 30, 1958 | 2 years, 166 days | PC (Frost) | |
| | Leslie Frost | February 3, 1958 | April 28, 1958 | 84 days (second instance) (12 years, 84 days in total) | PC (Frost) | While Premier |
| | James Allan | April 28, 1958 | January 27, 1961 | 8 years, 210 days | PC (Frost) | Concurrently Minister of Public Works (May 14, 1958 – December 22, 1958) |
| Minister of Economics and Federal and Provincial Relations | | | | 8 years, 210 days | PC (Frost) | |
| | James Allan | January 27, 1961 | December 15, 1961 | 8 years, 210 days | PC (Frost) | |
| Treasurer | | | | 8 years, 210 days | PC (Robarts) | |
| | James Allan | December 15, 1961 | November 24, 1966 | 8 years, 210 days | PC (Robarts) | Also Chair of the Treasury Board |
| | Charles MacNaughton | November 24, 1966 | July 23, 1968 | 4 years, 97 days (first instance) | PC (Robarts) | Also Chair of the Treasury Board |
| Treasurer and Minister of Economics | | | | 4 years, 97 days (first instance) | PC (Robarts) | |
| | Charles MacNaughton | July 23, 1968 | March 1, 1971 | 4 years, 97 days (first instance) | PC (Robarts) | Also Chair of the Treasury Board |
| | Darcy McKeough | March 1, 1971 | April 7, 1972 | 1 year, 190 days (first instance) | PC (Davis) | Also Chair of the Treasury Board |
| Treasurer and Minister of Economics and Intergovernmental Affairs | | | | 1 year, 190 days (first instance) | PC (Davis) | |
| | Darcy McKeough | April 10, 1972 | September 7, 1972 | 1 year, 190 days (first instance) | PC (Davis) | |
| | Charles MacNaughton | September 7, 1972 | March 15, 1973 | 130 days (second instance) (4 years, 286 days in total) | PC (Davis) | |
| | John White | January 15, 1973 | June 18, 1975 | 2 years, 154 days | PC (Davis) | |
| | Darcy McKeough | June 18, 1975 | August 16, 1978 | 3 years, 59 days (second instance) (4 years, 249 days in total) | PC (Davis) | |
| | Frank Miller | August 16, 1978 | August 30, 1979 | 4 years, 319 days | PC (Davis) | |
| Treasurer and Minister of Economics | | | | 4 years, 319 days | PC (Davis) | |
| | Frank Miller | August 30, 1979 | July 1, 1983 | 4 years, 319 days | PC (Davis) | |
| | Larry Grossman | July 6, 1983 | February 8, 1985 | 1 year, 299 days | PC (Davis) | |
| Treasurer | | | | 1 year, 299 days | PC (Miller) | |
| | Larry Grossman | February 8, 1985 | May 1, 1985 | 1 year, 299 days | PC (Miller) | |
| | Bette Stephenson | May 17, 1985 | June 26, 1985 | 40 days | PC (Miller) | While Deputy Premier |
| Treasurer and Minister of Economics | | | | | Liberal (Peterson) | |
| | Robert Nixon | June 26, 1985 | October 1, 1990 | 5 years, 97 days | Liberal (Peterson) | Concurrently Minister of Revenue (June 26, 1985 – September 29, 1987); Interim Chair of Management Board of Cabinet (June 17, 1986 – September 29, 1987); Minister of Financial Institutions (September 29, 1987 – August 16, 1988) |
| | Floyd Laughren | October 1, 1990 | February 1, 1993 | 4 years, 268 days | NDP (Rae) | |
| Minister of Finance | | | | 4 years, 268 days | NDP (Rae) | |
| | Floyd Laughren | February 1, 1993 | June 26, 1995 | 4 years, 268 days | NDP (Rae) | |
| | Ernie Eves | June 26, 1995 | February 8, 2001 | 5 years, 227 days | PC (Harris) | While Deputy Premier |
| | Jim Flaherty | February 8, 2001 | April 14, 2002 | 1 year, 65 days | PC (Harris) | While Deputy Premier |
| | Janet Ecker | April 15, 2002 | October 22, 2003 | 1 year, 190 days | PC (Eves) | |
| | Greg Sorbara | October 23, 2003 | October 11, 2005 | 1 year, 353 days (first instance) | Liberal (McGuinty) | Concurrently Chair of Management Board of Cabinet |
| | Dwight Duncan | October 11, 2005 | May 23, 2006 | 224 days (first instance) | Liberal (McGuinty) | Concurrently Chair of Management Board of Cabinet |
| | Greg Sorbara | May 23, 2006 | October 30, 2007 | 1 year, 160 days (second instance) (3 years, 148 days in total) | Liberal (McGuinty) | Interim minister; Concurrently Chair of Management Board of Cabinet |
| | Dwight Duncan | October 30, 2007 | February 11, 2013 | 5 years, 104 days (second instance) (5 years, 328 days in total) | Liberal (McGuinty) | Concurrently Chair of Management Board of Cabinet; Concurrently Minister of Revenue (September 18, 2008 – June 24, 2009); Concurrently Deputy Premier (October 20, 2011 – February 11, 2013); Interim Minister of Government Services (November 27, 2012 – February 11, 2013) |
| | Charles Sousa | February 11, 2013 | June 29, 2018 | 5 years, 138 days | Liberal (Wynne) | Concurrently Chair of Management Board of Cabinet; Associate Ministers of Finance (Ontario Retirement Pension Plan) are: Mitzie Hunter (June 24, 2014 – June 13, 2016); Indira Naidoo-Harris (June 13, 2016 – August 24, 2016) |
| | Vic Fedeli | June 29, 2018 | June 20, 2019 | 356 days | PC (Ford) | While Chair of Cabinet |
| | Rod Phillips | June 20, 2019 | December 31, 2020 | 1 year, 194 days | PC (Ford) | |
| | Peter Bethlenfalvy | December 31, 2020 | present | 5 years, 275 days | PC (Ford) | |
