= James Thompson Garrow =

Canadian politician

James Garrow
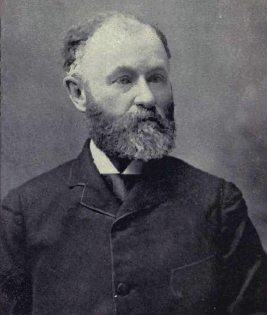

Ontario MPP
- In office 1890–1902
- Preceded by: Alexander Ross
- Succeeded by: Malcolm Graeme Cameron
- Constituency: Huron West

Personal details
- Born: March 11, 1843 Chippawa, Canada West
- Died: August 31, 1916 (aged 73) Toronto, Ontario
- Party: Liberal
- Spouse: Mary Balfour Fletcher (m. 1872)
- Occupation: Lawyer
- Cabinet: Minister Without Portfolio (1898-1899)

James Thompson Garrow, KC (March 11, 1843 – August 31, 1916) was an Ontario lawyer and political figure. He represented Huron West in the Legislative Assembly of Ontario as a Liberal member from 1890 to 1902.

He was born in Chippawa, Welland County, Canada West in 1843, the son of Edward Garrow, a Scottish immigrant. He studied law, was called to the bar in 1868, entered practice in Goderich with Malcolm Colin Cameron and was named Queen's Counsel in 1885. In 1872, he married Mary Balfour Fletcher. Garrow served as reeve of Goderich from 1874 to 1880 and served one year as warden for Huron County. He died in 1916.
