= Provincial Secretary and Registrar of Ontario =

Defunct Ontario political office

The Provincial Secretary and Registrar of Ontario was a senior position in the provincial cabinet of Ontario from before Canadian Confederation until the 1960s.

The provincial secretary and registrar was originally the second highest position in the provincial cabinet, equivalent to the position of deputy premier. The provincial secretary was the equivalent of the former Canadian Cabinet position of Secretary of State for Canada. Like its federal counterpart it included an eclectic variety of responsibilities that were not assigned to other ministers, most of which would eventually evolve into portfolios of their own. The provincial secretary was also responsible for official communications between the provincial government and the Colonial Office in London as well as with other provincial and colonial governments (and after 1867 the federal government). As well, the position also included various duties related to ceremonial occasions, visits by dignitaries, protocol, relations between the government and the office of lieutenant governor and commemorative events particularly in relation to the monarchy.

Generally, the provincial secretary acted as a province's registrar-general and was responsible for formal documents and records such as licences, birth and death certificates, land registries and surveys, business registrations and writs. As well, the position was generally responsible for the administration of the civil service and of elections. Provincial secretaries were usually the most senior member of the provincial cabinet outside of the premier, and the office holder was often designated as acting premier when the premier was out of province, ill or otherwise unavailable. The last individual to hold the position of provincial secretary and registrar (renamed Provincial Secretary and Minister of Citizenship in 1961) was John Yaremko who left office in 1972.

In 1972 the Progressive Conservative government of Bill Davis adopted the provincial secretary title for a non-departmental cabinet portfolio in which the occupant either having responsibility spreading over several ministries, assisting a senior minister in an area or as a secondary portfolio for a senior minister giving him a broader responsibility or mandate area. The three positions created were provincial secretary for social development, provincial secretary for justice and provincial secretary for resource development. These positions were unrelated to the original provincial secretary position except for the common name. The positions were retained by Davis' successor, Frank Miller, in 1985 but were abolished when the Progressive Conservatives lost power to David Peterson's Liberals in 1985.

== Pre-Confederation provincial secretary ==
Prior to Confederation and the creation of the office of premier, the provincial secretary was the most important and powerful figure in provincial politics. The title holder was appointed by the lieutenant governor and many sat as members of the Legislative Council.

=== Upper Canada ===
- William Jarvis (1791–1817) Family Compact (Conservative)
- Sir John Robinson, 1st Baronet, of Toronto (1817–1829) Family Compact (Conservative)
- Robert Baldwin Sullivan (1838–1840)

=== United Provinces of Canada ===
- Sir Dominick Daly (1844–1848) – former provincial secretary of Lower Canada (1827–1840), Canada East (1843–1844)
- Pierre Joseph Olivier Chauveau (1853–1854) Conservative
- Sir George-Étienne Cartier (1855–1857) Conservative

== Provincial secretary and registrar (after Confederation) ==
	Portrait	Name	Term of office		Tenure	Political party (Ministry)	Note
1		Matthew Crooks; Cameron	July 16, 1867	July 25, 1871	4 years, 9 days	Liberal Conservative (Macdonald)	
2		Stephen Richards	July 25, 1871	December 20, 1871	148 days	Liberal Conservative (Macdonald)	
3		Peter Gow	October 25, 1872	December 4, 1873	1 year, 40 days	Liberal (Blake)	
4		Timothy B. Pardee	October 25, 1872	December 4, 1873	1 year, 34 days	Liberal (Mowat)	
5		Christopher F. Fraser	December 4, 1873	July 23, 1875	1 year, 231 days	Liberal (Mowat)	
6		Samuel Wood	July 23, 1875	March 19, 1877	1 year, 239 days	Liberal (Mowat)	
7		Arthur Sturgis Hardy	March 19, 1877	January 18, 1889	11 years, 305 days	Liberal (Mowat)	
8		John M. Gibson	January 18, 1889	July 21, 1896	7 years, 185 days	Liberal (Mowat)	
9		William Balfour	July 21, 1896	August 19, 1896	29 days	Liberal (Hardy)	
10		Elihu Davis	August 19, 1896	October 21, 1899	3 years, 63 days	Liberal (Hardy)	
11		James Robert Stratton	October 21, 1899	November 22, 1904	5 years, 32 days	Liberal (Ross)	
12		George Perry Graham	November 22, 1904	February 8, 1905	78 days	Liberal (Ross)	
13		William Hanna	February 8, 1905	December 19, 1916	11 years, 315 days	Conservative (Whitney)	
13		William Hanna	February 8, 1905	December 19, 1916	11 years, 315 days	Conservative (Hearst)	
14		William McPherson	December 19, 1916	November 14, 1919	2 years, 330 days	Conservative (Hearst)	
15 (1)		Harry Nixon	November 14, 1919	July 16, 1923	3 years, 244 days	United Farmers (Drury)	
16		Lincoln Goldie	July 16, 1923	December 15, 1930	7 years, 152 days	Conservative (Ferguson)	
17		Leopold Macaulay	December 15, 1930	July 31, 1931	228 days	Conservative (Henry)	
18		George Challies	July 31, 1931	July 10, 1934	2 years, 344 days	Conservative (Henry)	
19 (2)		Harry Nixon	July 10, 1934	October 21, 1942	8 years, 103 days	Liberal (Hepburn)	
20		Norman Hipel	October 21, 1942	May 18, 1943	209 days	Liberal (Conant)	
21 (3)		Harry Nixon	May 18, 1943	August 17, 1943	91 days	Liberal (Nixon)	While Premier
22 (1)		George Dunbar	August 17, 1943	April 15, 1946	2 years, 241 days	PC (Drew)	
23		Roland Michener	April 15, 1946	October 19, 1948	2 years, 187 days	PC (Drew)	
24		Dana Porter	October 19, 1948	May 4, 1949	197 days	PC (Kennedy)	
25		George Welsh	May 4, 1949	January 20, 1955	5 years, 261 days	PC (Frost)	
26		William Nickle	January 20, 1955	August 17, 1955	209 days	PC (Frost)	
27 (2)		George Dunbar	August 17, 1955	December 22, 1958	3 years, 127 days	PC (Frost)	
28		Mac Phillips	December 22, 1958	May 26, 1960	1 year, 156 days	PC (Frost)	
29		John Yaremko	May 26, 1960	November 8, 1961	1 year, 166 days	PC (Frost)	
	Provincial Secretary and Minister of Citizenship						
1 (1)		John Yaremko	November 8, 1961	November 24, 1966	5 years, 16 days	PC (Robarts)	The registrar-general of Ontario eventually transferred to the Ministry of Government Services in 1972.
2		Bob Welch	November 24, 1966	March 1, 1971	4 years, 97 days	PC (Robarts)	
3 (2)		John Yaremko	March 1, 1971	April 7, 1972	1 year, 37 days (second instance)	PC (Davis)	After 1972 the responsibility of Citizenship affairs was transferred to the Ministry of Citizenship and Culture when it was formed in 1982.

== Premier Davis's Provincial Secretaries ==
In the 1971 provincial election, Premier Bill Davis secured the first electoral mandate under his leadership. Following the election, the Davis ministry formally kickstarted the most sweeping administrative reorganization in Ontario history for the stated purpose of modernizing policy-making and technocratic efficiency in early 1972. The reorganization was prompted by the recommendation of the Committee on Government Productivity (COGP) established in January 1970 that consisted of five senior civil servants of deputy minister rank and four business leaders who were president of major corporations based in Ontario. The committee conducted extensive engagement and studies and tabled ten reports between 1970 and 1973 proposing detailed and sweeping reorganization of the government and modernization of its operation. The first set of interim recommendations on department reorganization were contained in COGP's third report tabled in December 1971.

A significant recommendation was to group all the portfolio department by policy areas each with a senior policy minister as overseer. Davis quickly acted on the recommendations and in January 1972, he named the provincial secretaries for three distinct policy fields. They along with the Treasurer were to function as super ministers overseeing multiple portfolio ministers. The initial allocation of portfolio were as follows:

- Justice policy field
  - attorney general
  - solicitor general
  - correctional Services
  - consumer and commercial relations
- Treasury and government services
  - treasury
  - economics and intergovernmental affairs (absorbing municipal affairs)
  - revenue
  - government services
- Social development policy field
  - education
  - colleges and universities
  - community and social services
  - health
- Resources development policy field
  - agriculture and food
  - natural resources (absorbing northern affairs, mines)
  - environment (absorbing energy)
  - industry and tourism (later industry and trade)
  - transportation and communications
  - labour

The department to be establish for the management board was to be directly accountable to cabinet. As the reorganization progressed various modification were made, and certain planned changes were not proceeded with while other were reversed or partially reversed.

Each provincial secretary chaired a cabinet committee established for the field, consisted of the portfolio ministers within their policy field. They were responsible for co-ordinating and developing policies for the various ministries which formed that policy field. The provincial secretaries were given full portfolio minister status (some held portfolios within their policy field concurrently, while some have no concurrent portfolio responsibilities), with secretariats established for each field in order to provide analytical and research support to the provincial secretaries and the Cabinet committees.

Davis put his four former leadership rivals in charge of the four policy area initially, reflecting the seniority he intended for these provincial secretaries. Though they were powerful positions in principle, they carried no direct administrative responsibilities and led to a reduced profile for the ministers as portfolio ministers continue to take lead on the rollout of key initiatives and for the defences of relevant policies whether in questions periods or to the press. Allan Lawrence, Davis' primary leadership rival, was in the job for less than a year before leaving for federal politics. The frequent changes of officer holders and the lower statues of some of the later secretaries further diminished the statues of the posts. In the later years of the Davis ministry, sometimes junior ministers, or senior ministers being demoted were placed in these roles.

Premier Frank Miller continued with the practice of appointing provincial secretaries, but when David Peterson ascended to the premiership in 1985, the secretariats were terminated.

=== Provincial secretaries for justice ===
	Name	Term of office		Tenure	Political party (Ministry)	Note
1	Allan Lawrence	January 5, 1972	September 28, 1972	267 days	PC (Davis)	Concurrently Minister of Justice and Attorney General
2 (1)	George Kerr	September 28, 1972	February 26, 1974	1 year, 151 days	PC (Davis)	
3 (1)	Bob Welch	February 26, 1974	June 18, 1975	1 year, 112 days	PC (Davis)	Concurrently Attorney-General; concurrently Minister of Culture and Recreation (from January 14, 1975)
4	John Clement	June 18, 1975	October 7, 1975	111 days	PC (Davis)	Concurrently attorney-general and solicitor general
5	John MacBeth	October 7, 1975	January 21, 1978	2 years, 106 days	PC (Davis)	Concurrently Solicitor General; also interim Minister of Correctional Services (June – September, 1977)
6 (2)	George Kerr	January 21, 1978	August 18, 1978	209 days	PC (Davis)	Concurrently Solicitor-General
7 (2)	Bob Welch	August 18, 1978	August 30, 1979	1 year, 12 days	PC (Davis)	While Deputy Premier
8	Gordon Walker	August 30, 1979	February 13, 1982	2 years, 167 days	PC (Davis)	Concurrently Minister of Correctional Services (to April 10, 1981); concurrently Minister of Consumer and Commercial Relations (from April 10, 1981)
9	Norman Sterling	February 13, 1982	December 23, 1983	1 year, 313 days	PC (Davis)	
10 (3)	Bob Welch	December 23, 1983	February 8, 1985	1 year, 47 days	PC (Davis)	While Deputy Premier and Minister Responsible for Women's Issues
11	Reuben Baetz	February 8, 1985	May 1, 1985	82 days	PC (Miller)	
12	Alan Pope	May 17, 1985	June 26, 1985	40 days	PC (Miller)	Concurrently Attorney General

=== Provincial Secretaries for Resource Development ===
	Name	Term of office		Tenure	Political party (Ministry)	Note
1	Bert Lawrence	January 5, 1972	February 26, 1974	2 years, 52 days	PC (Davis)	Concurrently Minister of Health until February 2, 1972
2	Allan Grossman	February 26, 1974	October 7, 1975	1 year, 223 days	PC (Davis)	
3	Donald Irvine	October 7, 1975	February 3, 1977	1 year, 119 days	PC (Davis)	
4	René Brunelle	February 3, 1977	April 10, 1981	5 years, 296 days	PC (Davis)	
5	Russ Ramsay	April 10, 1981	February 13, 1982	309 days	PC (Davis)	
6	Lorne Henderson	February 13, 1982	July 6, 1983	1 year, 143 days	PC (Davis)	
7	Norm Sterling	July 6, 1983	February 8, 1985	1 year, 217 days	PC (Davis)	
8	Ernie Eves	February 8, 1985	May 1, 1985	82 days	PC (Miller)	Concurrently Minister of Skills Development (after March 22, 1985)
9	Dennis Timbrell	May 17, 1985	June 28, 1985	58 days	PC (Miller)	Concurrently Minister of Municipal Affairs and Housing

=== Provincial Secretaries for Social Development ===
	Name	Term of office		Tenure	Political party (Ministry)	Note
1	Bob Welch	January 5, 1972	February 26, 1974	2 years, 52 days	PC (Davis)	Concurrently Minister of Education (to February 2, 1972); concurrently Minister of Housing (after November 7, 1973)
2	Margaret Birch	February 26, 1974	December 23, 1983	9 years, 300 days	PC (Davis)	
3	Bruce McCaffrey	July 6, 1983	December 23, 1983	170 days	PC (Davis)	
4	Gordon Dean	December 23, 1983	February 8, 1985	1 year, 47 days	PC (Davis)	
4	Gordon Dean		May 1, 1985	82 days	PC (Miller)	
5	Larry Grossman	May 17, 1985	June 26, 1985	40 days	PC (Miller)	Concurrently (Minister of Education, and Minister of Colleges and Universities)

== See also ==
- Ministry of Government Services (Ontario) - current ministry where the registrar of Ontario resides
- Provincial Secretary of Quebec
