= Sylvester Neelon =

Canadian politician

Sylvester Neelon (January 7, 1825 – December 31, 1897) was an Ontario businessman and political figure. He represented Lincoln in the Legislative Assembly of Ontario as a Liberal member in 1875 and from 1879 to 1886.

He was born in New York state in 1825 and came to St. Catharines, Upper Canada with his parents in 1832. In 1852, he formed a shipping firm in partnership with James Norris. The company also purchased a flour mill, which Neelon retained when the partnership was dissolved. He continued to own ships and also manufactured barrels for the transporting of goods. He was also involved in railways, banking, the sale of dry goods, a paper mill and a tavern. Neelon married Cinderella Read and married his second wife, Louisa Latham Chisholm, in 1884 after Cinderella's death. He served on the town council for St. Catharines. In 1875, he was elected to the provincial legislative assembly but unseated for buying votes; he was reelected in 1879. His construction company won a masonry contract for Toronto's city hall in 1889.

He died in Toronto in 1897.

== Electoral history ==
1875 Ontario general election: Lincoln
Party	Candidate	Votes	%
Liberal	Sylvester Neelon	2,065	51.38
Conservative	John Rykert	1,954	48.62
Turnout		4,019	75.25
Eligible voters		5,341	
Liberal gain from Conservative			
Source: Elections Ontario

1879 Ontario general election: Lincoln
Party	Candidate	Votes	%	±%
Liberal	Sylvester Neelon	2,222	50.79	−0.59
Conservative	Mr. McCarthy	2,153	49.21	+0.59
Total valid votes		4,375	68.25	−7.00
Eligible voters		6,410		
Liberal hold		Swing		−0.59
Source: Elections Ontario
