= Ministry of Infrastructure (Ontario) =

Provincial ministry

- Ministère de l’Infrastructure (French)
- Government of Ontario wordmark

Ministry overview
- Formed: 2016
- Preceding Ministry: Ministry of Economic Development, Employment and Infrastructure
- Jurisdiction: Government of Ontario
- Ministers responsible: Kinga Surma, Minister of Infrastructure; Stephen Crawford, Parliamentary Assistant to the Minister of Infrastructure
- Website: www.ontario.ca/page/ministry-infrastructure

The Ministry of Infrastructure is a ministry responsible for public infrastructure in the Canadian province of Ontario. The current minister is Kinga Surma.

It is currently responsible for two crown agencies: Waterfront Toronto and Infrastructure Ontario (which was merged with the Ontario Realty Corporation in 2011).

== History ==
The maintenance and management of public infrastructure has consistently been a key function of the government since well before Confederation.

The Board of Works in the Province of Upper Canada was responsible for superintending, managing and controlling public works in the province. It was merged with a similar board in Lower Canada in 1841. The board was replaced in 1846 by the commissioners of public works who were responsible for "managing and controlling the construction, maintenance and repair of all canals, harbours, roads or parts of roads, bridges, slides, and other public works and buildings". Although legislations did not specifically designate the office of the commissioners as the Department of Public Works, that is how the commissioners refer to it in their first annual report.

At Confederation in 1867, responsibility for public works in Ontario was taken over by the Department of Public Works for Ontario, administered by the Commissioner of Agriculture and Public Works. In 1874, legislation was passed establishing a standalone commissioner to be responsible for the Department of Public Works. From 1896 to 1900 the Provincial Instructor in Road-Making was under the department.

In 1900, both the Office of the Commissioner of Highways and the Bureau of Labour were established as part of the Department of Public Works. In 1914, the Office of the Commissioner of Highways (by then renamed the Highways Branch), was elevated to Department status, becoming the Department of Public Highways. Similarly, by 1919, the Bureau of Labour had become the Department of Labour. Also in 1900, the Colonization Roads Branch was transferred to the Department of Public Works. Formerly with the Department of Crown Lands and responsible for constructing and repairing roads in sparsely settled areas of the province, this Branch was transferred to the Department of Lands, Forests and Mines in 1919.

The Department of Public Works continued to exist until 1972, when the government was considerably re-organized as the various Departments were restructured and renamed as Ministries. The Ministry of Government Services was created, assuming most of the functions of the former Department of Public Works, including the functions of constructing and maintaining government buildings.

In 1987, the Realty Group was formed within the Ministry of Government Services to provide accommodation and real estate services for the Ontario Government. In 1993, The Ontario Realty Corporation was established as the successor entity to the Realty Group, the Ontario Mortgage Corporation, and the Ontario Land Corporation. It was established as a Crown corporation and reported through the Management Board Secretariat. The Ministry of Government Services also ceased to exist in 1993, transferring most of its corporate services function, including buildings and facilities management, to the Management Board Secretariat.

In 2003, the Ministry of Public Infrastructure Renewal was created out of the winding-up of the Ontario Superbuild Corporation, inheriting its advisory and policy development and coordination responsibilities. Between 2003 and 2008, it assumed oversight of various agencies including the Smart Growth Secretariat, Ontario Lottery and Gaming Corporation, Ontario Realty Corporation, Infrastructure Ontario, and Liquor Control Board of Ontario.

Between 2008 and 2010, the Ministry was briefly merged with the Ministry of Energy to form the Ministry of Energy and Infrastructure. Between 2014 and 2016, it was again briefly merged, this time with the Economic Development Ministry to form the Ministry of Economic Development, Employment and Infrastructure.

In 2024, the Ministry was merged with the Queen’s Park Restoration Secretariat.

== List of ministers ==
Name	Term of office		Tenure	Political party (Ministry)	Note
Commissioner of Agriculture and Public Works				Liberal Conservative (MacDonald)	
John Carling	July 16, 1867	December 20, 1871	4 years, 157 days	Liberal Conservative (MacDonald)	
Archibald McKellar	December 20, 1871	October 25, 1872	2 years, 94 days	Liberal (Blake)	
Archibald McKellar	October 25, 1872	March 24, 1874	2 years, 94 days	Liberal (Mowat)	
Commissioner of Public Works				Liberal (Mowat)	
Christopher Finlay Fraser	April 4, 1874	May 30, 1894	20 years, 56 days	Liberal (Mowat)	Resigned due to poor health.
William Harty	May 30, 1894	July 21, 1896	5 years, 144 days	Liberal (Mowat)	
William Harty	July 21, 1896	October 21, 1899	5 years, 144 days	Liberal (Hardy)	
Francis Robert Latchford	October 21, 1899	November 22, 1904	5 years, 32 days	Liberal (Ross)	
William Andrew Charlton	November 22, 1904	February 8, 1905	78 days	Liberal (Ross)	
Joseph Octave Reaume	February 8, 1905	May 25, 1905	9 years, 236 days	Conservative (Whitney)	
Minister of Public Works			9 years, 236 days	Conservative (Whitney)	
Joseph Octave Reaume	May 25, 1905	October 2, 1914	9 years, 236 days	Conservative (Whitney)	
Findlay George MacDiarmid	October 2, 1914	April 8, 1915	188 days	Conservative (Hearst)	
Ministry of Public Works and Highways				Conservative (Hearst)	
Findlay George MacDiarmid	April 8, 1915	November 14, 1919	4 years, 220 days	Conservative (Hearst)	
Frank Campbell Biggs	November 14, 1919	July 16, 1923	3 years, 244 days	United Farmers (Drury)	
George Stewart Henry	July 16, 1923	September 16, 1930	7 years, 62 days	Conservative (Ferguson)	
Joseph Monteith	September 16, 1930	December 15, 1930	90 days	Conservative (Ferguson)	Concurrently Minister of Labour
Ministry of Public Works				Conservative (Ferguson)	
Joseph Monteith	December 15, 1930	January 8, 1934	3 years, 24 days	Conservative (Henry)	Concurrently Minister of Labour
Leopold Macaulay	January 12, 1934	July 10, 1934	179 days	Conservative (Henry)	Concurrently Minister of Highways
Thomas McQuesten	July 10, 1934	October 12, 1937	3 years, 94 days (first instance)	Liberal (Hepburn)	Concurrently Minister of Highways
Colin Campbell	October 12, 1937	January 23, 1941	3 years, 103 days	Liberal (Hepburn)	
Farquhar Oliver	January 23, 1941	October 27, 1942	1 year, 277 days (first instance)	Liberal (Hepburn)	Concurrently Minister of Welfare, resigned to protest Gordon Conant being named Premier.
Thomas McQuesten	October 27, 1942	May 18, 1943	203 days (second instance) (3 years, 297 days in total)	Liberal (Conant)	Concurrently Minister of Highways and Minister of Municipal Affairs
Farquhar Oliver	May 18, 1943	August 17, 1943	91 days (second instance) (2 years, 6 days in total)	Liberal (Nixon)	
George Doucett	August 17, 1943	October 19, 1948	8 years, 46 days	PC (Drew)	Concurrently Minister of Highways
George Doucett	October 19, 1948	May 4, 1949	8 years, 46 days	PC (Kennedy)	Concurrently Minister of Highways
George Doucett	May 4, 1949	October 2, 1951	8 years, 46 days	PC (Frost)	Concurrently Minister of Highways
Fletcher Stewart Thomas	October 2, 1951	January 20, 1953	1 year, 110 days	PC (Frost)	
William Griesinger	January 20, 1953	May 6, 1958	5 years, 106 days	PC (Frost)	Resigned from the provincial cabinet in 1958 after he was implicated in a stock trading scandal involving Northern Ontario Natural Gas.
James Allan	May 14, 1958	December 22, 1958	222 days	PC (Frost)	(interim)
Ray Connell	December 22, 1958	November 8, 1961	10 years, 165 days	PC (Frost)	
Ray Connell	November 8, 1961	June 5, 1969	10 years, 165 days	PC (Robarts)	
Jack Simonett	June 5, 1969	March 1, 1971	1 year, 269 days	PC (Robarts)	
James Auld	March 1, 1971	February 2, 1972	338 days (first instance)	PC (Davis)	
Minister of Government Services				PC (Davis)	
James Snow	February 2, 1972	October 7, 1975	3 years, 247 days	PC (Davis)	Ministry was formally renamed from Public Works to Government Services on April 7, 1972
Margaret Scrivener	October 7, 1975	February 3, 1977	1 year, 119 days	PC (Davis)	
John Smith	February 3, 1977	June 23, 1977	140 days	PC (Davis)	
James Auld	June 23, 1977	September 21, 1977	90 days (second instance) (1 years, 63 days in total)	PC (Davis)	
George McCague	September 21, 1977	January 21, 1978	122 days	PC (Davis)	
Lorne Henderson	January 21, 1978	August 30, 1979	1 year, 221 days	PC (Davis)	
Douglas Wiseman	August 30, 1979	July 6, 1983	3 years, 310 days	PC (Davis)	
George Ashe	July 6, 1983	February 8, 1985	1 year, 217 days	PC (Davis)	
Bob Runciman	February 8, 1985	May 17, 1985	98 days	PC (Miller)	
Jim Gordon	May 17, 1985	June 26, 1985	40 days	PC (Miller)	
Elinor Caplan	June 26, 1985	June 16, 1986	355 days	Liberal (Peterson)	
Sean Conway	June 17, 1986	September 9, 1987	1 year, 84 days	Liberal (Peterson)	
Richard Patten	September 29, 1987	August 2, 1989	1 year, 307 days	Liberal (Peterson)	
Chris Ward	August 2, 1989	October 1, 1990	1 year, 60 days	Liberal (Peterson)	
Frances Lankin	October 1, 1990	April 22, 1991	203 days	NDP (Rae)	
Fred Wilson	April 22, 1991	February 3, 1993	1 year, 287 days	NDP (Rae)	
Chair of the Management Board of Cabinet				NDP (Rae)	In 1993, most of the functions performed by the Ministry of Government Services were transferred to the Secretariat of the Management Board of Cabinet.
Brian Charlton	February 3, 1993	June 26, 1995	2 years, 143 days	NDP (Rae)	In 1993, most of the functions performed by the Ministry of Government Services were transferred to the Secretariat of the Management Board of Cabinet.
David Johnson	June 26, 1995	October 10, 1997	2 years, 106 days	PC (Harris)	
Chris Hodgson	October 10, 1997	February 8, 2001	3 years, 121 days	PC (Harris)	
David Tsubouchi	February 8, 2001	April 15, 2002	2 years, 256 days	PC (Harris)	
David Tsubouchi	April 15, 2002	October 22, 2003	2 years, 256 days	PC (Eves)	
Minister of Public Infrastructure Renewal				Liberal (McGuinty)	
David Caplan	October 23, 2003	June 20, 2008	4 years, 241 days	Liberal (McGuinty)	
Minister of Energy and Infrastructure				Liberal (McGuinty)	
George Smitherman	June 20, 2008	November 9, 2009	1 year, 142 days	Liberal (McGuinty)	
Gerry Phillips	November 9, 2009	January 18, 2010	70 days	Liberal (McGuinty)	
Brad Duguid	January 18, 2010	August 18, 2010	212 days (first instance)	Liberal (McGuinty)	Duguid continued to be Minister of Energy until 2011
Minister of Infrastructure				Liberal (McGuinty)	
Bob Chiarelli	August 18, 2010	February 11, 2013	2 years, 177 days (first instance)	Liberal (McGuinty)	
Glen Murray	February 11, 2013	June 24, 2014	1 year, 133 days	Liberal (Wynne)	
Minister of Economic Development, Employment and Infrastructure				Liberal (Wynne)	
Brad Duguid	June 24, 2014	June 13, 2016	1 year, 355 days (second instance) (2 years, 202 days in total)	Liberal (Wynne)	
Minister of Infrastructure				Liberal (Wynne)	
Bob Chiarelli	June 13, 2016	June 29, 2018	2 years, 16 days (second instance) (4 years, 193 days in total)	Liberal (Wynne)	
Monte McNaughton	June 29, 2018	June 20, 2019	356 days	PC (Ford)	
Laurie Scott	June 20, 2019	June 18, 2021	1 year, 363 days	PC (Ford)	
Kinga Surma	June 18, 2021	present	5 years, 106 days	PC (Ford)	
