= Isaac Master =

Canadian politician

Isaac Master (March 19, 1835 – January 6, 1898) was an Ontario farmer and political figure. He represented Waterloo South in the Legislative Assembly of Ontario as a Liberal member from 1878 to 1890.

He was born in Wilmot Township, Waterloo County, Upper Canada in 1834, of Pennsylvania Dutch descent. In 1857, he married Lydia Fried. He was first elected to the Ontario assembly in a by-election held after the death of John Fleming. He was elected again in an 1882 by-election after James Livingston was elected to the House of Commons. In 1891, he was named registrar for the county and moved to Berlin (later Kitchener). He served in that post until his death in 1898.

== Electoral history ==
Ontario provincial by-election, January 9, 1878: Waterloo South Death of John Fleming
Party	Candidate	Votes	%
Liberal	Isaac Master	1,252	50.10
Independent	Mr. Merners	1,247	49.90
Total valid votes		2,499	
Liberal hold			
Source: History of the Electoral Districts, Legislatures and Ministries of the Province of Ontario
