= Alexander Ross (Canadian politician) =

Canadian politician

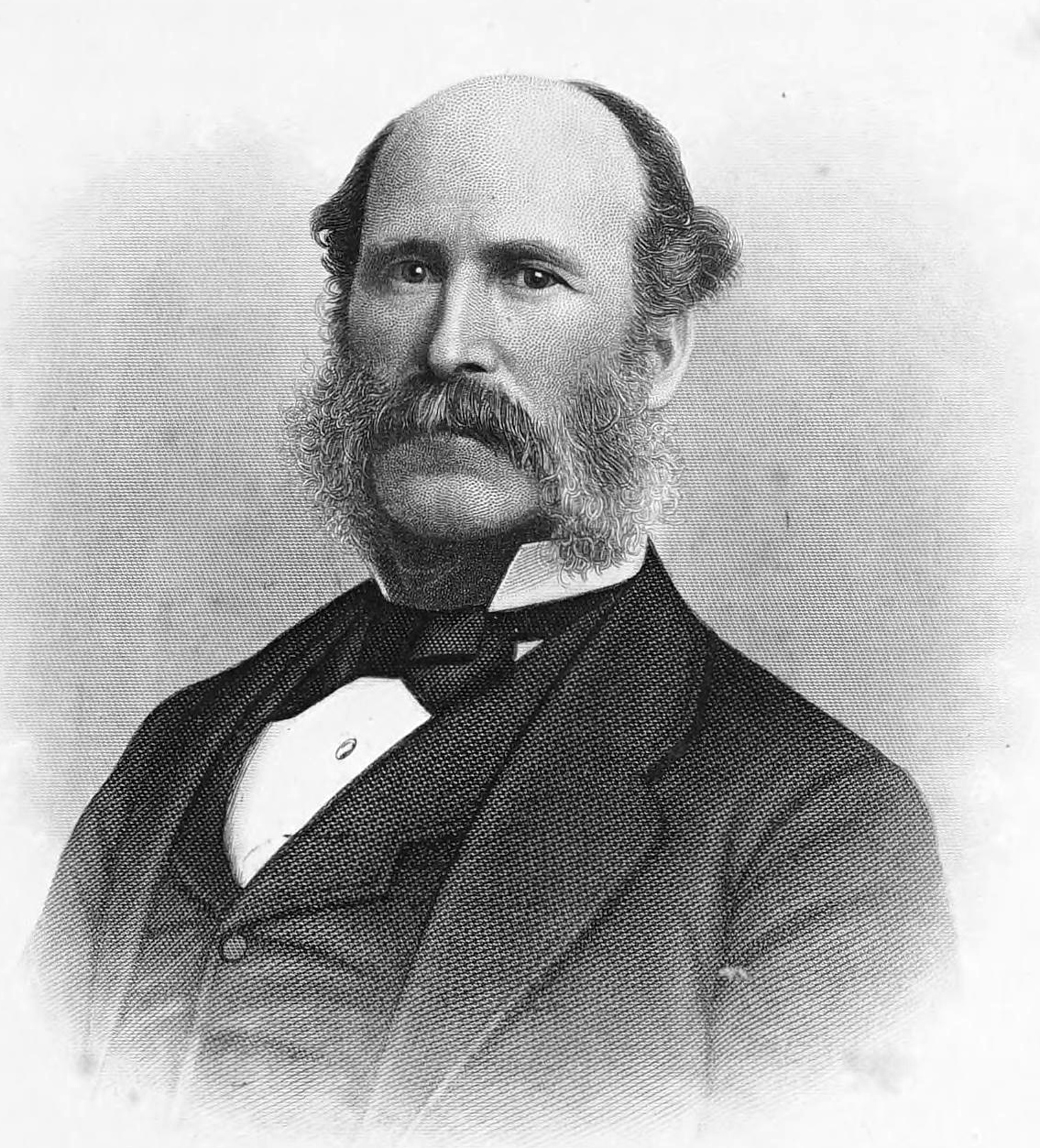
- Ross in an 1880 engraving

Ontario MPP
- In office 1875–1890
- Preceded by: New riding
- Succeeded by: James Thompson Garrow
- Constituency: Huron West

Personal details
- Born: April 20, 1829 Dundee, Scotland
- Died: March 31, 1901 (aged 71) Howick, Ontario, Canada
- Party: Liberal
- Spouse: Agnes Kydd (m. 1852)
- Occupation: Banker

Military service
- Allegiance: Canadian
- Branch/service: Militia
- Rank: Lieutenant-Colonel
- Battles/wars: Fenian raids

Alexander McLagan Ross (April 20, 1829 – March 31, 1901) was a Canadian banker and politician, who served as a Member of the Legislative Assembly of Ontario for Huron West from 1875 to 1890 as a Liberal member. He was provincial treasurer from 1883 to 1890.

He was born in Dundee, Scotland, the son of Colin Ross and Elizabeth McLagan, and came to Upper Canada with his family in 1834. He served as a clerk in the Bank of Upper Canada and was manager for the Royal Canadian Bank and then the Canadian Bank of Commerce at Goderich. In 1852, he married Agnes Kydd. In 1858, he was named treasurer for the united counties of Huron and Bruce. He continued to serve as treasurer for Huron from 1866 to 1883 after the two counties were split. Ross also served as Commissioner of Agriculture for the province from 1883 to 1888. In 1890, he was named county clerk for York County. He was a lieutenant-colonel in the local militia and served during the Fenian raids.

== Electoral history ==
1875 Ontario general election: Huron West
| Party | Candidate | Votes | % |
|---|---|---|---|
| Liberal | Alexander Ross | 1,595 | 51.48 |
| Conservative | J. Davison | 1,503 | 48.52 |
| Turnout | | 3,098 | 68.59 |
| Eligible voters | | 4,517 | |
| Liberal pickup new district. | | | |
Source: Elections Ontario

1879 Ontario general election: Huron West
| Party | Candidate | Votes | % | ±% |
|---|---|---|---|---|
| Liberal | Alexander Ross | 2,064 | 55.57 | +4.09 |
| Conservative | P. Kelly | 1,650 | 44.43 | −4.09 |
| Total valid votes | | 3,714 | 62.70 | −5.88 |
| Eligible voters | | 5,923 | | |
| Liberal hold | | Swing | | +4.09 |
Source: Elections Ontario

| Preceded by James Young | Treasurer of Ontario; 1883–1890 | Succeeded by Richard Harcourt |
