= 7th Parliament of Ontario =

The 7th Legislative Assembly of Ontario was in session from June 5, 1890, until May 29, 1894, just prior to the 1894 general election. The majority party was the Ontario Liberal Party led by Oliver Mowat.

Thomas Ballantyne served as speaker for the assembly.

There was a small third-party movement represented in the 7th Parliament: the McCarthyite movement included Liberals and Conservatives who supported the "Equal Rights Party," which was anti-Catholic and anti-French, and involved four members.

== Members of the Assembly ==
Riding	Member	Party	First elected / previously elected	No. of terms	Comments
Addington	James Reid	Conservative	1890	1st term	
Algoma East	Alexander Franklin Campbell	Conservative	1890	1st term	
Algoma West	James Conmee	Liberal	1885	3rd term	
Brant North	William Bruce Wood	Liberal	1886	2nd term	
Brant South	Arthur Sturgis Hardy	Liberal	1873	6th term	Commissioner of Crown Lands in Mowat ministry
Brockville	Christopher Finlay Fraser	Conservative	1872	6th term	Commissioner of Public Works in Mowat ministry
Bruce Centre	Walter MacMorris Dack	Liberal	1886	2nd term	
Bruce North	John George	Conservative	1890	1st term	unseated after an appeal
Bruce North	David Porter (1891)	Liberal	1891	1st term	elected March 3, 1891; died August 7, 1893
Bruce North	Daniel McNaughton (1893)	Liberal	1893	1st term	elected December 2, 1893
Bruce South	Hamilton Parke O'Connor	Liberal	1882	4th term	
Cardwell	William Henry Hammell	Conservative	1883	3rd term	
Carleton	George William Monk	Conservative	1871	6th term	
Dufferin	John Barr	Conservative Equal Rights	1875, (Note: First elected as a Conservative) 1890	3rd term*	
Dundas	James Pliny Whitney	Conservative	1888	2nd term	
Durham East	George Campbell	Conservative Equal Rights	1890	1st term	
Durham West	William Thomas Lockhart	Liberal	1890	1st term	
Elgin East	Henry Thomas Godwin	Conservative	1890	1st term	
Elgin West	Dugald McColl	Conservative	1890	1st term	
Essex North	Solomon White	Conservative	1878, 1890	4th term*	
Essex South	William Douglas Balfour	Liberal	1882	4th term	
Frontenac	Hugh Smith	Conservative	1888	2nd term	
Glengarry	James Rayside	Liberal	1882	4th term	
Grenville	Orlando Bush	Conservative	1890	1st term	
Grey Centre	Joseph Rorke	Conservative	1886	2nd term	
Grey North	James Cleland	Liberal	1890	1st term	
Grey South	James Hill Hunter	Liberal	1875, 1890	3rd term*	died February 2, 1891
Grey South	Gilbert McKechnie (1891)	Liberal	1891	1st term	elected April 1, 1891
Haldimand	Jacob Baxter	Liberal	1867	7th term	
Halton	William Kerns	Conservative	1883	3rd term	
Hamilton	Thomas Henry Stinson	Conservative	1890	1st term	
Hamilton	John Morison Gibson (1891)	Liberal	1879, 1891	4th term*	Provincial Secretary and Registrar in Mowat ministry
Hastings East	William Parker Hudson	Conservative	1883	3rd term	
Hastings North	Alpheus Field Wood	Conservative	1883	3rd term	
Hastings West	William Hodgins Biggar	Liberal	1890	1st term	
Huron East	Thomas Gibson	Liberal	1871	6th term	
Huron South	Archibald Bishop	Liberal	1873	6th term	
Huron West	James Thompson Garrow	Liberal	1890	1st term	
Kent East	Robert Ferguson	Liberal	1885	3rd term	
Kent West	James Clancy	Conservative	1883	3rd term	
Kingston	James Henry Metcalfe	Conservative	1879	4th term	resigned 1891 after being elected to a seat in federal parliament
Kingston	William Harty (1892)	Liberal	1892	1st term	elected February 23, 1892
Lambton East	Hugh McKenzie	Liberal	1890	1st term	died October 3, 1893
Lambton East	Peter Duncan McCallum (1893)	Independent Conservative	1893	1st term	elected December 2, 1893
Lambton West	Charles MacKenzie	Liberal	1889	2nd term	
Lanark North	William Clyde Caldwell	Liberal-Equal Rights	1872, 1879, 1888	5th term*	
Lanark South	Nathaniel McLenaghan	Conservative	1890	1st term	resigned 1893 after appointment as deputy custom collector in Perth
Lanark South	James Maitland Clarke (1894)	Liberal	1894	1st term	elected February 16, 1894
Leeds	Robert Henry Preston	Conservative	1875, 1883	4th term*	
Lennox	Walter William Meacham	Conservative	1886	2nd term	
Lincoln	James Hiscott	Conservative	1890	1st term	
London	William Ralph Meredith	Conservative	1872	6th term	Leader of the Opposition
Middlesex East	Richard Tooley	Conservative	1871, 1886	5th term*	
Middlesex North	John Waters	Liberal	1879	4th term	
Middlesex West	George William Ross	Liberal	1883	3rd term	Minister of Education in Mowat ministry
Monck	Richard Harcourt	Liberal	1879	4th term	Treasurer in Mowat ministry after October 25, 1890
Muskoka	George Frederick Marter	Conservative	1886	2nd term	
Nipissing	John Loughrin	Liberal	1890	1st term	
Norfolk North	John Bailey Freeman (Note: died in 1890)	Liberal	1879	4th term	died November 22, 1890
Norfolk North	Edwin Clarendon Carpenter (1891)	Liberal	1891	1st term	elected January 23, 1891
Norfolk South	William Andrew Charlton	Liberal	1890	1st term	
Northumberland East	William Arnson Willoughby	Conservative	1886, 1888	3rd term*	
Northumberland West	Corelli Collard Field	Liberal	1886	2nd term	
Ontario North	James Glendinning	Conservative	1890	1st term	
Ontario South	John Dryden	Liberal	1879	4th term	Minister of Agriculture in Mowat ministry after September 16, 1890
Ottawa	Erskine Henry Bronson	Liberal	1886	2nd term	
Oxford North	Oliver Mowat	Liberal	1872	6th term	Premier and Attorney General in Mowat ministry
Oxford South	Angus McKay	Liberal	1886	2nd term	
Parry Sound	James Sharpe	Liberal	1890	1st term	
Peel	Kenneth Chisholm	Liberal	1873	6th term	resigned 1892 after being appointed registrar of Peel
Peel	John Smith (1892)	Liberal	1892	1st term	elected December 30, 1892
Perth North	Alfred Emanuel Ahrens	Liberal	1890	1st term	unseated after an appeal
Perth North	Thomas Magwood (1891)	Conservative	1891	1st term	elected February 6, 1891
Perth South	Thomas Ballantyne	Liberal	1875	5th term	Speaker
Peterborough East	Thomas Blezard	Liberal	1879	4th term	
Peterborough West	James Robert Stratton	Liberal	1886	2nd term	
Prescott	Francis Eugene Alfred Evanturel	Liberal	1886	2nd term	
Prince Edward	John Allison Sprague	Liberal	1886	2nd term	
Renfrew North	Arunah Dunlop	Conservative	1890	1st term	died January 1, 1892
Renfrew North	Henry Barr (1892)	Liberal	1892	1st term	elected February 23, 1892
Renfrew South	John Francis Dowling	Liberal	1883, 1890	2nd term*	
Russell	Alexander Robillard	Liberal	1886	2nd term	
Simcoe Centre	Robert Paton	Liberal	1890	1st term	
Simcoe East	Andrew Miscampbell	Conservative	1890	1st term	
Simcoe West	Thomas Wylie	Conservative	1886	2nd term	
Stormont	William Mack	Liberal	1879, 1886	3rd term*	
Toronto (Note: Toronto had 3 seats)	Edward Frederick Clarke	Conservative	1886	2nd term	
Toronto	Henry Edward Clarke (1892)	Conservative	1892	1st term	died March 25, 1892
Toronto	Joseph Tait (1893)	Liberal	1893	1st term	
Toronto by-el	Nelson Gordon Bigelow(1892)	Liberal	1892	1st term	elected April 29, 1892; died November 4, 1892
Toronto by-el	George Ryerson (1893)	Conservative	1893	1st term	elected February 28, 1893
Victoria East	John Fell	Conservative	1883	3rd term	
Victoria West	John McKay	Liberal-Equal Rights	1890	1st term	
Waterloo North	Elias Weber Bingeman Snider	Liberal	1881	4th term	
Waterloo South	John Douglas Moore	Liberal	1890	1st term	
Welland	William McCleary	Conservative	1890	1st term	
Wellington East	Charles Clarke	Liberal	1871	6th term	resigned October 6, 1891 after appointment as clerk for the legislature
Wellington East	James Kirkwood (1891)	Liberal	1891	1st term	elected November 10, 1891
Wellington South	Donald Guthrie	Liberal	1886	2nd term	
Wellington West	Absalom Shade Allan	Liberal	1886	2nd term	
Wentworth North	James McMahon	Liberal	1875	5th term	
Wentworth South	Nicholas Awrey	Liberal	1879	4th term	
York East	George Byron Smith	Liberal	1886	2nd term	
York North	Elihu James Davis	Liberal	1888	2nd term	
York West	John Taylor Gilmour	Liberal	1886	2nd term	
