= 1890 Ontario general election =

Canadian provincial election

- June 5, 1890

91 seats in the 7th Legislative Assembly of Ontario 46 seats were needed for a majority
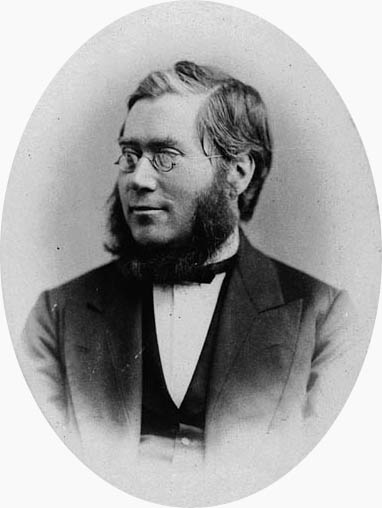

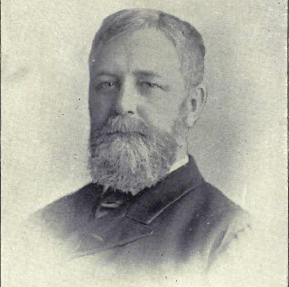
	First party	Second party
Leader	Oliver Mowat	William Ralph Meredith
Party	Liberal	Conservative
Leader since	1872	1879
Leader's seat	Oxford North	London
Last election	57	32
Seats won	53	34
Seat change	▼4	▲2
Premier before election
Oliver Mowat
Liberal
Premier after election
Oliver Mowat
Liberal

The 1890 Ontario general election was the seventh general election held in the province of Ontario, Canada. It was held on June 5, 1890, to elect the 91 members of the 7th Legislative Assembly of Ontario ("MLAs").

The Assembly had been increased from 90 members after the passage of an Act in 1889 creating Nipissing as a riding.

The election was a victory for the Ontario Liberal Party, led by Oliver Mowat. The party won a sixth consecutive term in government, despite losing a small number of seats in the Legislature.

The Ontario Conservative Party, led by William Ralph Meredith won two additional seats.

This election was held partially using the Limited voting system where each Toronto voter had two votes for the three MPPs in the district. This produced mixed representation in that district and thus a degree of minority representation.

A key issue in the election was the segregation of schools for Catholic and Protestant students, with the Liberal Party supporting the segregation and the Conservatives opposing it.

An 1887 Act had renamed the riding of Cornwall and Stormont as Stormont.

== Results ==
Elections to the 7th Parliament of Ontario (1890)
Political party	Party leader	MPPs					Votes		
Political party	Party leader	Candidates	1886	Dissol.	1890	±	#	%	± (pp)
Liberal	Oliver Mowat	87	57		53	4▼	162,118	49.63%	1.22▲
Conservative	William Ralph Meredith	74	32		34	2▲	130,289	39.88%	7.14▼
Conservative-Equal Rights		14	–	–	2	2▲	26,154	8.01%	New
Liberal-Equal Rights		2	–	–	2	2▲	3,352	1.03%	New
Independent		1	1	–	–	1▼	7	–	0.68▼
Equal Rights		7	–	–	–		3,131	0.96%	New
Independent-Liberal		1	–	–	–		1,620	0.50%	New
Labour			–	–	–		Did not campaign		
Temperance			–	–	–		Did not campaign		
Vacant									
Total		186	90	90	91		326,671	100.00%	
Blank and invalid ballots							3,110		
Registered voters / turnout							473,853	69.60%	0.09▼

Seats and popular vote by party of major influence
Party	Seats	Votes	Change (pp)
Liberal (Note: Straight party support only. Other MLAs sponsored by Equal Rights Party are allocated to the latter, to show extent of influence.)	53 / 91	49.63%	1.22
Conservative	34 / 91	39.88%	-7.14
Equal Rights	4 / 91	10.00%	10.00
Labour	0 / 91	0.00%	-3.85
Other	0 / 91	0.49%	-0.23

=== Synopsis of results ===
Results by riding - 1890 Ontario general election
Riding (Note: excluding Toronto, a multi-member constituency)	Winning party						Turnout	Votes					
Name (Note: order is as given in EO reports)	1886	Party	Votes	Share	Margin #	Margin %	Turnout	Lib	Con	EqR	I-Lib	Ind	Total
Addington	Con	Con	1,498	51.48%	86	2.96%	62.05%	1,412	1,498	–	–	–	2,910
Algoma East	Lib	Con	1,569	50.97%	60	1.95%	110.54%	1,509	1,569	–	–	–	3,078
Algoma West	Lib	Lib	786	51.95%	59	3.90%	116.85%	786	727	–	–	–	1,513
Brant North	Lib	Lib	1,178	64.20%	521	28.39%	66.55%	1,178	657	–	–	–	1,835
Brant South	Lib	Lib	2,067	59.06%	634	18.11%	65.02%	2,067	1,433	–	–	–	3,500
Brockville	Lib	Lib	1,781	52.37%	161	4.73%	62.44%	1,781	–	–	1,620	–	3,401
Bruce Centre	Lib	Lib	1,860	54.56%	311	9.12%	69.74%	1,860	–	1,549	–	–	3,409
Bruce North	Con	Con	1,835	50.23%	17	0.47%	70.83%	1,818	1,835	–	–	–	3,653
Bruce South	Lib	Lib	2,179	64.41%	975	28.82%	64.86%	2,179	1,204	–	–	–	3,383
Cardwell	Con	Con	1,183	50.97%	45	1.94%	41.81%	–	2,321 (Note: the incumbent William Henry Hammell was the winning candidate)	–	–	–	2,321
Carleton	Con	Con	1,145	50.20%	9	0.39%	45.56%	1,136	1,145	–	–	–	2,281
Stormont	Lib	Lib	2,262	54.27%	356	8.54%	68.38%	2,262	1,906	–	–	–	4,168
Dufferin	Con	C-ER	1,333	54.70%	730	29.95%	40.18%	603	–	1,834 (Note: John Barr (Conservative/Equal Rights) was the winning candidate)	–	–	2,437
Dundas	Lib	Con	2,104	51.92%	156	3.85%	78.15%	1,948	2,104	–	–	–	4,052
Durham East	Con	C-ER	1,314	50.19%	10	0.38%	55.35%	–	1,304	1,314	–	–	2,618
Durham West	Lib	Lib	1,694	50.76%	51	1.53%	73.21%	1,694	1,643	–	–	–	3,337
Elgin East	Lib	Con	2,038	51.49%	118	2.98%	74.29%	1,920	2,038	–	–	–	3,958
Elgin West	Con	Con	2,384	52.02%	185	4.04%	67.70%	2,199	2,384	–	–	–	4,583
Essex North	Lib	Con	1,901	47.90%	635	16.00%	58.22%	2,068 (Note: the incumbent Gaspard Pacaud received 1,266 votes)	1,901	–	–	–	3,969
Essex South	Lib	Lib	2,505	52.15%	207	4.31%	73.61%	2,505	2,298	–	–	–	4,803
Frontenac	Con	Con	1,258	52.03%	98	4.05%	65.67%	1,160	1,258	–	–	–	2,418
Glengarry	Lib	Lib	1,756	53.96%	258	7.93%	66.38%	1,756	1,498	–	–	–	3,254
Grenville	Con	Con	1,611	57.33%	412	14.66%	48.87%	–	2,810 (Note: the incumbent Frederick John French received 1,199 votes)	–	–	–	2,810
Grey Centre	Con	Con	1,513	52.48%	143	4.96%	48.76%	1,370	1,513	–	–	–	2,883
Grey North	Con	Lib	2,312	54.44%	377	8.88%	67.88%	2,312	1,935	–	–	–	4,247
Grey South	Con	Lib	2,156	51.73%	144	3.45%	72.98%	2,156	2,012	–	–	–	4,168
Haldimand	Lib	Lib	2,000	54.54%	333	9.08%	81.00%	2,000	1,667	–	–	–	3,667
Halton	Con	Con	2,377	51.98%	181	3.96%	78.53%	2,196	2,377	–	–	–	4,573
Hamilton	Lib	Con	4,111	50.53%	86	1.06%	78.54%	4,025	4,111	–	–	–	8,136
Hastings East	Con	Con	1,801	50.13%	9	0.25%	79.49%	1,792	1,801	–	–	–	3,593
Hastings North	Con	Con	acclaimed										
Hastings West	Con	Lib	1,678	52.11%	136	4.22%	64.41%	1,678	1,542	–	–	–	3,220
Huron East	Lib	Lib	2,256	56.27%	503	12.55%	73.87%	2,256	1,753	–	–	–	4,009
Huron South	Lib	Lib	2,144	51.91%	158	3.83%	68.23%	2,144	1,986	–	–	–	4,130
Huron West	Lib	Lib	2,125	51.35%	112	2.71%	64.60%	2,125	2,013	–	–	–	4,138
Kent East	Lib	Lib	2,347	53.99%	633	14.56%	88.46%	4,061 (Note: the incumbent Robert Ferguson was the winning candidate)	–	286	–	–	4,347
Kent West	Con	Con	2,823	50.37%	41	0.73%	65.34%	2,782	2,823	–	–	–	5,605
Kingston	Con	Con	1,629	50.45%	29	0.90%	58.16%	1,600	1,629	–	–	–	3,229
Lambton East	Lib	Lib	2,203	52.40%	462	10.99%	73.65%	2,203	1,741	260	–	–	4,204
Lambton West	Lib	Lib	2,748	55.46%	713	14.39%	56.04%	2,748	2,035	172	–	–	4,955
Lanark North	Lib	L-ER	1,525	53.30%	189	6.61%	71.27%	–	1,336	1,525 (Note: the Liberal incumbent William Clyde Caldwell ran as a Liberal/Equal Rights candidate)	–	–	2,861
Lanark South	Con	Con	1,509	58.17%	431	16.62%	54.29%	1,078	1,509	–	–	7	2,594
Leeds	Con	Con	1,813	57.10%	451	14.20%	57.69%	1,362	1,813	–	–	–	3,175
Lennox	Con	Con	1,441	50.38%	22	0.77%	70.54%	1,419	1,441	–	–	–	2,860
Lincoln	Lib	Con	2,424	51.63%	153	3.26%	67.51%	2,271	2,424	–	–	–	4,695
London	Con	Con	acclaimed										
Middlesex East	Con	Con	2,508	50.58%	58	1.17%	74.07%	2,450	2,508	–	–	–	4,958
Middlesex North	Lib	Lib	2,060	51.05%	85	2.11%	78.04%	2,060	1,975	–	–	–	4,035
Middlesex West	Lib	Lib	1,950	51.64%	124	3.28%	80.35%	1,950	1,826	–	–	–	3,776
Monck	Lib	Lib	1,765	56.83%	424	13.65%	71.30%	3,106 (Note: the incumbent Richard Harcourt was the winning candidate)	0	–	–	–	3,106
Muskoka	Con	Con	1,565	51.46%	89	2.93%	77.76%	1,476	1,565	–	–	–	3,041
Nipissing	New	Lib	881	67.25%	452	34.50%	64.56%	881	429	–	–	–	1,310
Norfolk North	Lib	Lib	1,601	55.30%	307	10.60%	72.46%	1,601	1,294	–	–	–	2,895
Norfolk South	Con	Lib	1,563	51.06%	65	2.12%	76.54%	1,563	1,498	–	–	–	3,061
Northumberland East	Con	Con	2,185	53.36%	275	6.72%	83.74%	1,910	2,185 (Note: William Arnson Willoughby was elected in 1886, but was unseated by the court)	–	–	–	4,095
Northumberland West	Lib	Lib	1,453	57.82%	393	15.64%	65.90%	1,453	1,060	–	–	–	2,513
Ontario North	Lib	Con	1,869	51.07%	78	2.13%	70.38%	1,791	1,869	–	–	–	3,660
Ontario South	Lib	Lib	2,460	51.38%	132	2.76%	73.43%	2,460	2,328	–	–	–	4,788
Ottawa	Lib	Lib	3,379	63.24%	1,415	26.48%	58.66%	3,379	–	1,964	–	–	5,343
Oxford North	Lib	Lib	acclaimed										
Oxford South	Lib	Lib	1,764	64.69%	801	29.37%	44.21%	1,764	–	963	–	–	2,727
Parry Sound	Ind	Lib	1,387	52.06%	110	4.13%	n/a	1,387	1,277	–	–	–	2,664
Peel	Lib	Lib	2,059	51.54%	123	3.08%	74.33%	2,059	–	1,936	–	–	3,995
Perth North	Con	Lib	2,729	50.86%	92	1.71%	72.44%	2,729	2,637	–	–	–	5,366
Perth South	Lib	Lib	2,241	58.19%	631	16.39%	61.55%	2,241	–	1,610	–	–	3,851
Peterborough East	Lib	Lib	1,421	51.43%	79	2.86%	70.40%	1,421	–	1,342	–	–	2,763
Peterborough West	Lib	Lib	1,925	58.58%	564	17.16%	70.65%	1,925	–	1,361	–	–	3,286
Prescott	Lib	Lib	acclaimed										
Prince Edward	Lib	Lib	2,040	50.09%	7	0.17%	71.71%	2,040	2,033	–	–	–	4,073
Renfrew North	Lib	Con	1,843	51.22%	88	2.45%	75.64%	1,755	1,843	–	–	–	3,598
Renfrew South	Lib	Lib	1,470	49.71%	229	7.74%	63.02%	2,711 (Note: the winning candidate John Francis Dowling had been previously elected to the Legislature)	–	246	–	–	2,957
Russell	Lib	Lib	2,223	61.56%	835	23.12%	57.36%	2,223	1,388	–	–	–	3,611
Simcoe Centre	Lib	Lib	1,559	57.72%	417	15.44%	60.03%	1,559	–	1,142	–	–	2,701
Simcoe East	Lib	Con	2,092	51.96%	158	3.92%	62.59%	1,934	2,092	–	–	–	4,026
Simcoe West	Con	Con	1,318	61.56%	495	23.12%	44.95%	823	1,318	–	–	–	2,141
Victoria East	Con	Con	1,459	51.26%	72	2.53%	55.05%	1,387	1,459	–	–	–	2,846
Victoria West	Con	L-ER	1,827	56.70%	432	13.41%	66.13%	–	1,395	1,827	–	–	3,222
Waterloo North	Lib	Lib	2,205	59.79%	722	19.58%	66.67%	2,205	1,483	–	–	–	3,688
Waterloo South	Lib	Lib	2,161	55.34%	417	10.68%	66.42%	2,161	1,744	–	–	–	3,905
Welland	Lib	Con	2,345	50.77%	71	1.54%	71.83%	2,274	2,345	–	–	–	4,619
Wellington East	Lib	Lib	1,562	58.61%	459	17.22%	53.37%	1,562	1,103	–	–	–	2,665
Wellington South	Lib	Lib	2,098	59.20%	652	18.40%	61.76%	2,098	1,446	–	–	–	3,544
Wellington West	Lib	Lib	1,495	55.70%	306	11.40%	58.64%	1,495	1,189	–	–	–	2,684
Wentworth North	Lib	Lib	1,469	55.43%	288	10.87%	72.58%	1,469	1,181	–	–	–	2,650
Wentworth South	Lib	Lib	1,472	50.88%	51	1.76%	81.96%	1,472	1,421	–	–	–	2,893
York East	Lib	Lib	1,705	58.94%	517	17.87%	63.29%	1,705	–	1,188	–	–	2,893
York North	Lib	Lib	1,875	61.29%	691	22.59%	47.87%	1,875	–	1,184	–	–	3,059
York West	Lib	Lib	1,789	50.87%	61	1.73%	94.73%	1,789	–	1,728	–	–	3,517

= open seat
= turnout is above provincial average
= winning candidate was in previous Legislature
= incumbent had switched allegiance
= previously incumbent in another riding
= not incumbent; was previously elected to the Legislature
= incumbency arose from byelection gain
= incumbency arose from prior election result being overturned by the court
= other incumbents renominated
= joint Conservative/Equal Rights candidate
= joint Liberal/Equal Rights candidate
= previously an MP in the House of Commons of Canada
= multiple candidates

Results for Toronto (3 seats)
Political party	Candidate	Votes	%	Elected	Incumbent
Conservative	Edward Frederick Clarke	5,862	18.81	✓	✓
Conservative	Henry Edward Clarke	5,542	17.78	✓	✓
Liberal	Joseph Tait	5,359	17.20	✓	
Liberal	Alfred McDougall	5,197	16.68		
Conservative/Equal Rights	E.D. Armour	4,502	14.45		
Conservative/Equal Rights	Robert Bell	4,001	12.84		
Equal Rights	Frank Moses	703	2.26		
Majority (Note: plurality for third winning candidate)		162	0.52		
Turnout		31,287	72.31		
Registered voters		43,265			

=== Analysis ===
Party candidates in 2nd place (Note: excluding Toronto seats)
Party in 1st place	Party in 2nd place						Total
Party in 1st place	Accl	Lib	Con	C-ER	Ind-L	ER	Total
Liberal	2	3	35	10	1	1	52
Conservative	2	28	2				32
C-ER		1	1				2
L-ER			2				2
Total	4	32	40	10	1	1	88

Candidates ranked 1st to 5th place, by party
Parties	Accl	1st	2nd	3rd	4th	5th
█ Liberal	2	50	32	2	1	
█ Conservative	2	31	41			
█ Conservative/Equal Rights		2	10			1
█ Liberal/Equal Rights		2				
█ Equal Rights			1	5		
█ Independent Liberal			1			
█ Independent				1		

Resulting composition of the 2nd Legislative Assembly of Ontario
Source		Party				
Source		Lib	Con	C-ER	L-ER	Total
Seats retained	Incumbents returned	36	14			50
Seats retained	Returned by acclamation	2	2			4
Seats retained	Open seats held	6	3			9
Seats retained	Byelection loss reversed		2			2
Seats retained	Defeated by same-party candidate		1			1
Seats changing hands	Incumbents defeated	5	9		1	15
Seats changing hands	Open seats gained	2		2		4
Seats changing hands	Byelection gains held		1			1
Seats changing hands	Incumbent changed allegiance				1	1
New seat	New MLAs	1				1
Toronto seats	MLA returned		2			2
Toronto seats	New MLAs	1				1
Total		53	34	2	2	91

=== MLAs elected by region and riding ===
Party designations are as follows:

Liberal
Conservative
Conservative/Equal Rights
Liberal/Equal Rights

Northern Ontario

- Algoma East: Alexander Franklin Campbell
- Algoma West: James Conmee
- Nipissing: John Loughrin

Ottawa Valley

- Carleton: George William Monk
- Lanark North: William Clyde Caldwell
- Lanark South: Nathaniel McLenaghan
- Ottawa: Erskine Henry Bronson
- Prescott: Alfred Évanturel
- Renfrew North: Arunah Dunlop
- Renfrew South: John Francis Dowling
- Russell: Alexander Robillard

Saint Lawrence Valley

- Brockville: Christopher Finlay Fraser
- Cornwall and Stormont: William Mack
- Dundas: James Pliny Whitney
- Glengarry: James Rayside
- Grenville: Orlando Bush
- Kingston: James Henry Metcalfe
- Leeds: Robert Henry Preston

Central Ontario

- Addington: James Reid
- Durham East: George Campbell (Note: Election declared void because of corrupt practices. Writ for new election issued. Campbell was reelected in the subsequent byelection.)
- Durham West: William Thomas Lockhart
- Frontenac: Hugh Smith
- Hastings East: William Parker Hudson
- Hastings North: Alpheus Field Wood
- Hastings West: William Hodgins Biggar
- Lennox: Walter William Meacham
- Northumberland East: William Arnson Willoughby
- Northumberland West: Corelli Collard Field
- Peterborough East: Thomas Blezard
- Peterborough West: James Robert Stratton
- Prince Edward: John Allison Sprague
- Victoria East: John Fell
- Victoria West: John McKay

Georgian Bay

- Bruce North: John George (Note: Election declared void because of corrupt practices. Writ for new election issued. David Porter (Liberal) was elected in the subsequent byelection.)
- Grey North: James Cleland
- Muskoka: George Frederick Marter
- Parry Sound: James Sharpe
- Simcoe Centre: Robert Paton
- Simcoe East: Andrew Miscampbell
- Simcoe West: Thomas Wylie

Wentworth/Halton/Niagara

- Halton: William Kerns
- Hamilton: Thomas Stinson (Note: Election declared void because of corrupt practices. Writ for new election issued. John Morison Gibson (Liberal) was elected in the subsequent byelection.)
- Lincoln: James Hiscott
- Monck: Richard Harcourt
- Welland: William McCleary
- Wentworth North: James McMahon
- Wentworth South: Nicholas Awrey

Midwestern Ontario

- Brant North: William Bruce Wood
- Brant South: Arthur Sturgis Hardy
- Bruce Centre: Walter MacMorris Dack
- Bruce South: Hamilton Parke O'Connor
- Dufferin: John Barr
- Grey Centre: Joseph Rorke
- Grey South: James Hill Hunter
- Haldimand: Jacob Baxter
- Huron East: Thomas Gibson
- Huron South: Archibald Bishop
- Huron West: James Thompson Garrow
- Norfolk North: John Bailey Freeman (Note: Died before assuming office. Writ for new election issued. Edwin Clarendon Carpenter (Liberal) was elected in the subsequent byelection.)
- Norfolk South: William Andrew Charlton (Note: Election declared void because of corrupt practices. Writ for new election issued. Charlton was reelected in the subsequent byelection.)
- Oxford North: Oliver Mowat
- Oxford South: Angus McKay
- Perth North: Alfred Emanuel Ahrens (Note: Election declared void because of corrupt practices. Writ for new election issued. Thomas Magwood (Conservative) was elected in the subsequent byelection.)
- Perth South: Thomas Ballantyne
- Waterloo North: Elias Weber Bingeman Snider
- Waterloo South: John Douglas Moore
- Wellington East: Charles Clarke
- Wellington South: Donald Guthrie
- Wellington West: Absalom Shade Allan

Southwestern Ontario

- Elgin East: Henry Thomas Godwin
- Elgin West: Dugald McColl
- Essex North: Solomon White
- Essex South: William Douglas Balfour
- Kent East: Robert Ferguson
- Kent West: James Clancy
- Lambton East: Hugh McKenzie
- Lambton West: Charles MacKenzie
- London: William Ralph Meredith
- Middlesex East: Richard Tooley
- Middlesex North: John Waters
- Middlesex West: George William Ross

Peel/York/Ontario

- Cardwell: William Henry Hammell
- Ontario North: James Glendinning
- Ontario South: John Dryden
- Peel: Kenneth Chisholm
- Toronto: Edward Frederick Clarke
- Toronto: Henry Edward Clarke
- Toronto: Joseph Tait
- York East: George Byron Smith
- York North: Elihu James Davis
- York West: John Taylor Gilmour

=== Seats that changed hands ===
In its first election, Nipissing returned the Liberal candidate John Loughrin as its MLA.

Elections to the 18th Parliament of Ontario – seats won/lost by party, 1886–1890
Party	1886	Gain from (loss to)										1890
Party	1886	Lib		Con		Con-ER		Lib-ER		Ind		1890
Liberal	57			5	(10)				(1)	1		52
Conservative	32	10	(5)				(2)		(1)			34
Conservative-Equal Rights	–			2								2
Liberal-Equal Rights	–	1		1								2
Independent	1		(1)									–
Total	90	11	(6)	8	(10)	–	(2)	–	(2)	1	–	90

In the election, 20 seats changed their allegiance.

Liberal to Conservative

- Algoma East
- Dundas
- Elgin East
- Essex North
- Hamilton
- Lincoln
- Ontario North
- Renfrew North
- Simcoe East
- Welland

Liberal to Liberal-Equal Rights

- Lanark North

Conservative to Liberal

- Grey North
- Grey South
- Hastings West
- Norfolk South
- Perth North

Conservative to Conservative-Equal Rights

- Dufferin
- Durham East

Conservative to Liberal-Equal Rights

- Victoria West

Independent to Liberal

- Parry Sound

== See also ==
- Politics of Ontario
- List of Ontario political parties
- Premier of Ontario
- Leader of the Opposition (Ontario)
