= 1886 Ontario general election =

Canadian provincial election

- December 28, 1886

90 seats in the 6th Legislative Assembly of Ontario 46 seats were needed for a majority
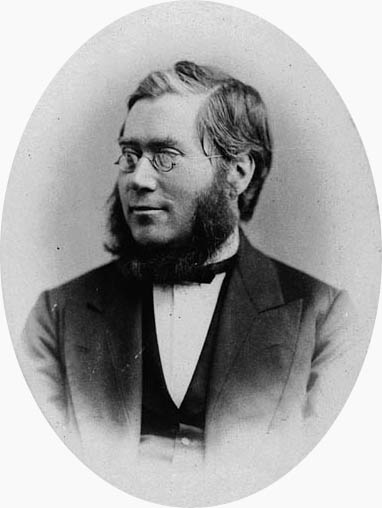

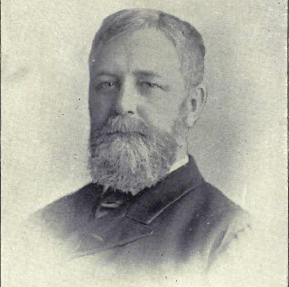
	First party	Second party
Leader	Oliver Mowat	William Ralph Meredith
Party	Liberal	Conservative
Leader since	1872	1879
Leader's seat	Oxford North	London
Last election	48	37
Seats won	57	32
Seat change	▲9	▼5
Premier before election
Oliver Mowat
Liberal
Premier after election
Oliver Mowat
Liberal

The 1886 Ontario general election was the sixth general election held in the province of Ontario, Canada. It was held on December 28, 1886, to elect the 90 Members of the 6th Legislative Assembly of Ontario ("MLAs"). The election results were characterized a "crushing defeat for the Conservatives.

The Ontario Liberal Party, led by Oliver Mowat, won a fifth consecutive term in government and an increased majority in the Legislature.

The Ontario Conservative Party, led by William Ralph Meredith lost five of its seats.

In Toronto, this and the next election (1890) were held under the Limited Vote system wherein Toronto voters had two votes for the three MPPs in their district. This allowed a degree of minority representation.

== Redistribution of ridings ==
The Assembly was increased from 88 to 90 members, through the following changes:

Abolished ridings	New ridings
Divisions of ridings
Algoma	Algoma East; Algoma West
Muskoka and Parry Sound	Muskoka; Parry Sound
Mergers of ridings
Cornwall; Stormont	Cornwall and Stormont
Toronto East; Toronto West	Toronto (Note: Returning three members. Each elector had two votes to cast.)
Reorganization of ridings
Bruce North; Bruce South	Bruce Centre; Bruce North; Bruce South
Grenville South; Leeds North and Grenville North; Leeds South	Grenville; Leeds
Simcoe East; Simcoe South; Simcoe West	Simcoe Centre; Simcoe East; Simcoe West
Victoria North; Victoria South	Victoria East; Victoria West

== Results ==
Elections to the 6th Parliament of Ontario (1886)
Political party	Party leader	MPPs					Votes		
Political party	Party leader	Candidates	1883	Dissol.	1886	±	#	%	± (pp)
Liberal	Oliver Mowat	88	48		57	9▲	153,282	48.41%	0.21▲
Conservative	William Ralph Meredith	83	37		32	5▼	148,969	47.05%	0.46▲
Independent		5	1		1	Steady	2,145	0.68%	0.85▼
Independent-Liberal			2		–	2▼	Did not campaign		
Labour		5	–	–	–		12,196	3.85%	2.32▲
Temperance		1	–	–	–		14	–	New
Independent-Conservative			–	–	–		Did not campaign		
Vacant									
Total		182	88	88	90		316,606	100.00%	
Blank and invalid ballots							3,622		
Registered voters / turnout							463,025	68.85	0.90▲

Seats and popular vote by party
Party	Seats	Votes	Change (pp)
Liberal	57 / 90	48.41%	0.21
Conservative	32 / 90	47.05%	0.46
Labour	0 / 90	3.85%	2.32
Other	1 / 90	0.69%	-2.99

=== Synopsis of results ===
Results by riding - 1886 Ontario general election
Riding (Note: excluding Toronto, a multi-member constituency)	Winning party						Turnout	Votes					
Name (Note: order is as given in EO reports)	1883	Party	Votes	Share	Margin #	Margin %	Turnout	Lib	Con	Lab	Tmp	Ind	Total
Addington	Con	Con	1,712	53.42%	219	6.83%	70.69%	1,493	1,712	–	–	–	3,205
Algoma East	New	Lib	acclaimed										
Algoma West	New	Lib	acclaimed										
Brant North	Lib	Lib	1,025	60.87%	366	21.73%	55.41%	1,025	659	–	–	–	1,684
Brant South	Lib	Lib	1,881	60.58%	657	21.16%	57.84%	1,881	1,224	–	–	–	3,105
Brockville	Lib	Lib	1,844	54.19%	285	8.37%	71.33%	1,844	1,559	–	–	–	3,403
Bruce Centre	New	Lib	1,753	50.45%	31	0.89%	71.55%	1,753	1,722	–	–	–	3,475
Bruce North	I-Lib	Con	1,738	51.77%	119	3.54%	68.33%	1,619	1,738	–	–	–	3,357
Bruce South	Lib	Lib	2,024	54.69%	347	9.38%	74.63%	2,024	1,677	–	–	–	3,701
Cardwell	Con	Con	1,805	59.71%	587	19.42%	57.66%	1,218	1,805	–	–	–	3,023
Carleton	Con	Con	1,824	75.40%	1,229	50.81%	45.79%	595	1,824	–	–	–	2,419
Cornwall and Stormont	New	Lib	2,068	54.48%	340	8.96%	69.39%	2,068	1,728	–	–	–	3,796
Dufferin	Con	Con	acclaimed										
Dundas	Con	Lib	1,977	50.32%	25	0.64%	81.54%	1,977	1,952	–	–	–	3,929
Durham East	Con	Con	1,696	56.36%	383	12.73%	63.53%	1,313	1,696	–	–	–	3,009
Durham West	Lib	Lib	1,672	50.04%	3	0.09%	73.78%	1,672	1,669	–	–	–	3,341
Elgin East	Con	Lib	1,873	51.23%	90	2.46%	67.51%	1,873	1,783	–	–	–	3,656
Elgin West	Lib	Con	2,315	50.47%	43	0.94%	69.49%	2,272	2,315	–	–	–	4,587
Essex North	Con	Lib	1,729	51.17%	79	2.34%	58.70%	1,729	1,650	–	–	–	3,379
Essex South	Lib	Lib	2,497	53.80%	353	7.61%	77.51%	2,497	2,144	–	–	–	4,641
Frontenac	Con	Con	1,218	58.53%	355	17.06%	58.79%	863	1,218	–	–	–	2,081
Glengarry	Lib	Lib	1,723	50.47%	32	0.94%	76.91%	1,723	1,691	–	–	–	3,414
Grenville	New	Con	1,978	57.84%	550	16.08%	63.64%	1,428	1,978	–	14	–	3,420
Grey Centre	Con	Con	1,485	44.29%	112	3.34%	59.07%	1,373	1,980 (Note: the incumbent Neil McColman received 495 votes)	–	–	–	3,353
Grey North	Con	Con	2,076	50.22%	18	0.44%	67.75%	2,058	2,076	–	–	–	4,134
Grey South	Con	Con	2,087	53.23%	253	6.45%	71.17%	1,834	2,087	–	–	–	3,921
Haldimand	Lib	Lib	1,936	53.67%	265	7.35%	72.77%	1,936	1,671	–	–	–	3,607
Halton	Con	Con	2,277	51.38%	122	2.75%	73.07%	2,155	2,277	–	–	–	4,432
Hamilton	Lib	Lib	3,068	44.53%	435	6.31%	63.12%	3,068	2,633	1,188	–	–	6,889
Hastings East	Con	Con	1,784	51.53%	106	3.06%	84.87%	1,678	1,784	–	–	–	3,462
Hastings North	Con	Con	1,863	62.88%	763	25.75%	63.71%	1,100	1,863	–	–	–	2,963
Hastings West	Lib	Con	1,681	51.83%	119	3.67%	64.50%	1,562	1,681	–	–	–	3,243
Huron East	Lib	Lib	2,306	55.31%	443	10.63%	73.33%	2,306	1,863	–	–	–	4,169
Huron South	Lib	Lib	2,313	56.15%	507	12.31%	66.45%	2,313	1,806	–	–	–	4,119
Huron West	Lib	Lib	2,358	53.85%	337	7.70%	68.25%	2,358	2,021	–	–	–	4,379
Kent East	Lib	Lib	2,302	57.21%	580	14.41%	58.00%	2,302	1,722	–	–	–	4,024
Kent West	Con	Con	2,208	50.17%	15	0.34%	57.03%	2,193	2,208	–	–	–	4,401
Kingston	Con	Con	1,853	53.57%	247	7.14%	66.03%	1,606	1,853	–	–	–	3,459
Lambton East	Lib	Lib	2,270	52.78%	239	5.56%	70.43%	2,270	2,031	–	–	–	4,301
Lambton West	Lib	Lib	2,541	54.88%	452	9.76%	60.90%	2,541	–	2,089	–	–	4,630
Lanark North	Lib	Lib	1,392	51.71%	92	3.42%	67.24%	1,392	1,300	–	–	–	2,692
Lanark South	Ind	Con	1,836	56.44%	419	12.88%	72.99%	1,417	1,836	–	–	–	3,253
Leeds	New	Con	1,964	54.86%	348	9.72%	70.27%	1,616	1,964	–	–	–	3,580
Lennox	Con	Con	1,627	51.63%	103	3.27%	74.89%	1,524	1,627	–	–	–	3,151
Lincoln	Lib	Lib	2,242	50.17%	15	0.34%	63.58%	2,242	2,227	–	–	–	4,469
London	Con	Con	1,679	53.56%	223	7.11%	40.48%	–	1,679	1,456	–	–	3,135
Middlesex East	Lib	Con	2,621	51.04%	107	2.08%	70.38%	2,514	2,621	–	–	–	5,135
Middlesex North	Lib	Lib	2,044	50.88%	71	1.77%	74.22%	2,044	1,973	–	–	–	4,017
Middlesex West	Con	Lib	2,021	52.53%	195	5.07%	72.05%	2,021	1,826	–	–	–	3,847
Monck	Lib	Lib	1,643	51.78%	113	3.56%	72.06%	1,643	1,530	–	–	–	3,173
Muskoka	New	Con	1,565	53.84%	223	7.67%	72.90%	1,342	1,565	–	–	–	2,907
Norfolk North	Lib	Lib	1,640	56.51%	378	13.03%	70.14%	1,640	1,262	–	–	–	2,902
Norfolk South	Con	Con	1,528	52.11%	124	4.23%	78.29%	1,404	1,528	–	–	–	2,932
Northumberland East	Lib	Con	2,204	50.59%	51	1.17%	72.55%	2,153	2,204	–	–	–	4,357
Northumberland West	Con	Lib	1,710	58.06%	475	16.13%	69.90%	1,710	1,235	–	–	–	2,945
Ontario North	Lib	Lib	2,006	51.86%	144	3.72%	72.89%	2,006	1,862	–	–	–	3,868
Ontario South	Lib	Lib	2,651	52.30%	233	4.60%	69.31%	2,651	2,418	–	–	–	5,069
Ottawa	Con	Lib	1,815	53.97%	277	8.24%	53.32%	1,815	1,538	–	–	10	3,363
Oxford North	Lib	Lib	1,981	63.31%	833	26.62%	49.29%	1,981	1,148	–	–	–	3,129
Oxford South	Lib	Lib	2,216	54.23%	590	14.44%	65.85%	2,460 (Note: the incumbent George Atwell Cooke received 244 votes)	1,626	–	–	–	4,086
Parry Sound	New	Ind	1,199	51.88%	87	3.76%	58.48%	–	1,112	–	–	1,199	2,311
Peel	Lib	Lib	2,102	52.76%	220	5.52%	73.63%	2,102	1,882	–	–	–	3,984
Perth North	Con	Con	2,445	50.43%	42	0.87%	69.96%	2,403	2,445	–	–	–	4,848
Perth South	Lib	Lib	2,385	55.26%	454	10.52%	72.27%	2,385	1,931	–	–	–	4,316
Peterborough East	Lib	Lib	1,438	56.15%	340	13.28%	67.49%	1,438	1,098	–	–	25	2,561
Peterborough West	Con	Lib	1,555	50.54%	33	1.07%	73.94%	1,555	1,522	–	–	–	3,077
Prescott	Lib	Lib	1,665	52.24%	143	4.49%	69.25%	3,187 (Note: Alfred Évanturel was the winning candidate)	–	–	–	–	3,187
Prince Edward	I-Lib	Lib	2,155	50.96%	81	1.92%	72.58%	2,155	2,074	–	–	–	4,229
Renfrew North	Lib	Lib	1,515	51.46%	86	2.92%	72.90%	1,515	1,429	–	–	–	2,944
Renfrew South	Lib	Lib	1,050	45.85%	9	0.39%	59.20%	2,091 (Note: the incumbent John Francis Dowling received 1,041 votes)	199	–	–	–	2,290
Russell	Con	Lib	1,908	51.41%	148	3.99%	61.05%	1,908	1,760	–	–	43	3,711
Simcoe Centre	New	Lib	1,366	54.10%	207	8.20%	62.48%	1,366	1,159	–	–	–	2,525
Simcoe East	Lib	Lib	1,805	53.15%	214	6.30%	62.16%	1,805	1,591	–	–	–	3,396
Simcoe West	Lib	Con	1,498	56.70%	354	13.40%	56.82%	1,144	1,498	–	–	–	2,642
Victoria East	New	Con	1,733	55.16%	324	10.31%	67.66%	1,409	1,733	–	–	–	3,142
Victoria West	New	Con	1,438	50.17%	10	0.35%	65.49%	1,428	1,438	–	–	–	2,866
Waterloo North	Lib	Lib	acclaimed										
Waterloo South	Lib	Lib	2,353	55.27%	449	10.55%	n/a	2,353	1,904	–	–	–	4,257
Welland	Lib	Lib	2,462	53.16%	293	6.33%	68.00%	2,462	2,169	–	–	–	4,631
Wellington East	Lib	Lib	acclaimed										
Wellington South	Lib	Lib	2,120	59.40%	671	18.80%	62.34%	2,120	1,449	–	–	–	3,569
Wellington West	Lib	Lib	1,633	55.00%	297	10.00%	62.08%	1,633	1,336	–	–	–	2,969
Wentworth North	Lib	Lib	1,480	59.82%	486	19.64%	67.13%	1,480	994	–	–	–	2,474
Wentworth South	Lib	Lib	1,476	51.92%	109	3.83%	82.48%	1,476	1,367	–	–	–	2,843
York East	Lib	Lib	1,633	65.29%	765	30.59%	56.51%	1,633	–	–	–	868	2,501
York North	Lib	Lib	2,220	62.41%	883	24.82%	56.54%	2,220	1,337	–	–	–	3,557
York West	Con	Lib	1,539	53.12%	181	6.25%	62.51%	1,539	1,358	–	–	–	2,897

= open seat
= turnout is above provincial average
= winning candidate was in previous Legislature
= incumbent had switched allegiance
= previously incumbent in another riding
= not incumbent; was previously elected to the Legislature
= incumbency arose from byelection gain
= incumbency arose from prior election result being overturned by the court
= other incumbents renominated
= previously an MP in the House of Commons of Canada
= multiple candidates

Results for Toronto (3 seats)
Political party	Candidate	Votes	%	Elected	Incumbent
Conservative	Edward Frederick Clarke	7,032	26.28	✓	
Conservative	Henry Edward Clarke	6,883	25.72	✓	✓
Liberal	John Leys	5,380	20.11	✓	
Labour	Charles March	4,055	15.15		
Labour	John Roney	3,408	12.74		
Majority (Note: plurality for third winning candidate)		1,325	4.96		
Turnout (Note: actual number of voters per returns)		14,916	44.80		
Registered voters		33,296			

=== Analysis ===
Party candidates in 2nd place (Note: excluding Toronto seats)
Party in 1st place	Party in 2nd place					Total
Party in 1st place	Accl	Lib	Con	Lab	Ind	Total
Liberal	4	2	48	1	1	56
Conservative	1	28		1		30
Independent			1			1
Total	5	30	49	2	1	87

Candidates ranked 1st to 5th place, by party
Parties	Accl	1st	2nd	3rd	4th	5th
█ Liberal	4	52	30	2		
█ Conservative	1	30	50	2		
█ Independent		1	1	3		
█ Labour			2	1	1	1
█ Temperance				1		

Resulting composition of the 2nd Legislative Assembly of Ontario
Source		Party			
Source		Lib	Con	Ind	Total
Seats retained	Incumbents returned	30	13		44
Seats retained	Returned by acclamation	2	1		3
Seats retained	Open seats held	7	2		9
Seats retained	Byelection loss reversed		1		1
Seats retained	Defeated by same-party candidate	2	1		3
Seats changing hands	Incumbents defeated	3	3		6
Seats changing hands	Open seats gained	6	3		9
Seats changing hands	Byelection gains held	1			1
Seats changing hands	Incumbent changed allegiance		1		1
New seats	Acclaimed	2			2
New seats	New MLAs	2	2	1	5
New seats	Previously incumbent in another riding	1	3		4
Toronto seats	MLA returned		1		1
Toronto seats	New MLAs	1	1		2
Total		57	32	1	90

=== MLAs elected by region and riding ===
Party designations are as follows:

Liberal
Conservative
Independent

Northern Ontario

- Algoma East: Robert Adam Lyon
- Algoma West: James Conmee

Ottawa Valley

- Carleton: George William Monk
- Lanark North: Daniel Hilliard
- Lanark South: William Lees
- Ottawa: Erskine Henry Bronson
- Prescott: Alfred Évanturel
- Renfrew North: Thomas Murray
- Renfrew South: John Alfred McAndrew
- Russell: Alexander Robillard

Saint Lawrence Valley

- Brockville: Christopher Finlay Fraser
- Cornwall and Stormont: William Mack
- Dundas: Theodore F. Chamberlain (Note: Election declared void because of corrupt practices. Writ for new election issued. James Pliny Whitney (Conservative) was elected in the subsequent byelection.)
- Glengarry: James Rayside
- Grenville: Frederick John French
- Kingston: James Henry Metcalfe
- Leeds: Robert Henry Preston

Central Ontario

- Addington: John Stewart Miller
- Durham East: Thomas Dixon Craig
- Durham West: James Wellington McLaughlin
- Frontenac: Henry Wilmot
- Hastings East: William Parker Hudson
- Hastings North: Alpheus Field Wood
- Hastings West: Gilbert Wellington Ostrom
- Lennox: Walter William Meacham
- Northumberland East: William Arnson Willoughby (Note: Election declared void because of corrupt practices. Writ for new election issued. Richard Clark (Liberal) was elected in the subsequent byelection.)
- Northumberland West: Corelli Collard Field
- Peterborough East: Thomas Blezard
- Peterborough West: James Robert Stratton
- Prince Edward: John Allison Sprague
- Victoria East: John Fell
- Victoria West: John Saunders Cruess

Georgian Bay

- Bruce North: John Walter Scott Biggar
- Grey North: David Creighton
- Muskoka: George Frederick Marter
- Parry Sound: Samuel Armstrong
- Simcoe Centre: Orson James Phelps
- Simcoe East: Charles Alfred Drury
- Simcoe West: Thomas Wylie

Wentworth/Halton/Niagara

- Halton: William Kerns
- Hamilton: John Morison Gibson
- Lincoln: William Garson
- Monck: Richard Harcourt
- Welland: James E. Morin
- Wentworth North: James McMahon
- Wentworth South: Nicholas Awrey

Midwestern Ontario

- Brant North: William Bruce Wood
- Brant South: Arthur Sturgis Hardy
- Bruce Centre: Walter MacMorris Dack
- Bruce South: Hamilton Parke O'Connor
- Bruce South: Hamilton Parke O'Connor
- Dufferin: Falkner Cornwall Stewart
- Grey Centre: Joseph Rorke
- Grey South: John Blythe
- Haldimand: Jacob Baxter
- Huron East: Thomas Gibson
- Huron South: Archibald Bishop
- Huron West: Alexander McLagan Ross
- Norfolk North: John Bailey Freeman
- Norfolk South: William Morgan
- Oxford North: Oliver Mowat
- Oxford South: Angus McKay
- Perth North: John George Hess
- Perth South: Thomas Ballantyne
- Waterloo North: Elias Weber Bingeman Snider
- Waterloo South: Isaac Master
- Wellington East: Charles Clarke
- Wellington South: Donald Guthrie
- Wellington West: Absalom Shade Allan

Southwestern Ontario

- Elgin East: Thomas McIntyre Nairn
- Elgin West: Andrew B. Ingram
- Essex North: Gaspard Pacaud
- Essex South: William Douglas Balfour
- Kent East: Robert Ferguson
- Kent West: James Clancy
- Lambton East: Peter Graham
- Lambton West: Timothy Blair Pardee
- London: William Ralph Meredith
- Middlesex East: Richard Tooley
- Middlesex North: John Waters
- Middlesex West: George William Ross

Peel/York/Ontario

- Cardwell: William Henry Hammell
- Ontario North: Isaac James Gould
- Ontario South: John Dryden
- Peel: Kenneth Chisholm
- Toronto: Edward Frederick Clarke
- Toronto: Henry Edward Clarke
- Toronto: John Leys
- York East: George Byron Smith
- York North: Joseph Henry Widdifield
- York West: John Taylor Gilmour

== See also ==
- Politics of Ontario
- List of Ontario political parties
- Premier of Ontario
- Leader of the Opposition (Ontario)
