= 6th Parliament of Ontario =

The 6th Parliament of Ontario was in session from December 29, 1886, until April 26, 1890, just prior to the 1890 general election. The majority party was the Ontario Liberal Party led by Oliver Mowat.

Jacob Baxter served as speaker for the assembly.

== Members of the Assembly ==
Riding	Member	Party	First elected / previously elected	No. of terms	Comments
Addington	John Stewart Miller	Conservative	1886	1st term	
Algoma East	Robert Adam Lyon	Liberal	1878	4th term	
Algoma West	James Conmee	Liberal	1885	2nd term	
Brant North	William Bruce Wood	Liberal	1886	1st term	
Brant South	Arthur Sturgis Hardy	Liberal	1873	5th term	Provincial Secretary and Registrar in Mowat ministry until January 18, 1889; Commissioner of Crown Lands in Mowat ministry after January 18, 1889
Brockville	Christopher Finlay Fraser	Conservative	1872	5th term	Commissioner of Public Works in Mowat ministry
Bruce Centre	Walter MacMorris Dack	Liberal	1886	1st term	
Bruce North	John Walter Scott Biggar	Conservative	1886	1st term	
Bruce South	Hamilton Parke O'Connor	Liberal	1882	3rd term	
Cardwell	William Henry Hammell	Conservative	1883	2nd term	
Carleton	George William Monk	Conservative	1871	5th term	
Cornwall and Stormont	William Mack	Liberal	1879, 1886	2nd term*	
Dufferin	Falkner Cornwall Stewart	Conservative	1886	1st term	
Dundas	Theodore F. Chamberlain	Liberal	1886	1st term	unseated April 23, 1887 after an appeal
Dundas	James Pliny Whitney (1888)	Conservative	1888	1st term	elected January 31, 1888
Durham East	Thomas Dixon Craig	Conservative	1886	1st term	
Durham West	James Wellington McLaughlin	Liberal	1879	3rd term	
Elgin East	Thomas McIntyre Nairn	Liberal	1879, 1886	2nd term*	died June 1, 1888
Elgin East	James Charles Dance (1888)	Liberal	1888	1st term	elected October 26, 1888
Elgin West	Andrew B. Ingram	Conservative	1886	1st term	
Essex North	Gaspard Pacaud	Liberal	1886	1st term	
Essex South	William Douglas Balfour	Liberal	1882	3rd term	
Frontenac	Henry Wilmot	Conservative	1883	2nd term	died July 1, 1888
Frontenac	Hugh Smith (1888)	Conservative	1888	1st term	elected October 11, 1888
Glengarry	James Rayside	Liberal	1882	3rd term	
Grenville	Frederick John French	Conservative	1879	3rd term	
Grey Centre	Joseph Rorke	Conservative	1886	1st term	
Grey North	David Creighton	Conservative	1875	4th term	
Grey South	John Blythe	Conservative	1883	2nd term	
Haldimand	Jacob Baxter	Liberal	1867	6th term	Speaker
Halton	William Kerns	Conservative	1883	2nd term	
Hamilton	John Morison Gibson	Liberal	1879	3rd term	Provincial Secretary and Registrar in Mowat ministry after January 18, 1889
Hastings East	William Parker Hudson	Conservative	1883	2nd term	
Hastings North	Alpheus Field Wood	Conservative	1883	2nd term	
Hastings West	Gilbert Wellington Ostrom	Conservative	1886	1st term	
Huron East	Thomas Gibson	Liberal	1871	5th term	
Huron South	Archibald Bishop	Liberal	1873	5th term	
Huron West	Alexander McLagan Ross	Liberal	1875	4th term	Treasurer in Mowat ministry; Commissioner of Agriculture in Mowat ministry until May 1, 1888
Kent East	Robert Ferguson	Liberal	1885	2nd term	
Kent West	James Clancy	Conservative	1883	2nd term	
Kingston	James Henry Metcalfe	Conservative	1879	3rd term	
Lambton East	Peter Graham	Liberal	1875	4th term	
Lambton West	Timothy Blair Pardee	Liberal	1867	6th term	Commissioner of Crown Lands in Mowat ministry until January 18, 1889; died January 18, 1888
Lambton West	Charles MacKenzie (1889)	Liberal	1889	1st term	elected October 19, 1889
Lanark North	Daniel Hilliard	Liberal	1886	1st term	died June 1, 1888
Lanark North	William Clyde Caldwell (1888)	Liberal	1872, 1879, 1888	4th term*	elected August 23, 1888
Lanark South	William Lees	Conservative	1879	3rd term	
Leeds	Robert Henry Preston	Conservative	1875, 1883	3rd term*	
Lennox	Walter William Meacham	Conservative	1886	1st term	
Lincoln	William Garson	Liberal	1886	1st term	
London	William Ralph Meredith	Conservative	1872	5th term	Leader of the Opposition
Middlesex East	Richard Tooley	Conservative	1871, 1886	4th term*	
Middlesex North	John Waters	Liberal	1879	3rd term	
Middlesex West	George William Ross	Liberal	1883	2nd term	Minister of Education in Mowat ministry
Monck	Richard Harcourt	Liberal	1879	3rd term	
Muskoka	George Frederick Marter	Conservative	1886	1st term	
Norfolk North	John Bailey Freeman	Liberal	1879	3rd term	
Norfolk South	William Morgan	Conservative	1879	3rd term	
Northumberland East	William Arnson Willoughby	Conservative	1886	1st term	unseated February 1, 1888;
Northumberland East	Richard Clarke (1888)	Liberal	1888	1st term	seated February 1, 1888; died August 7, 1888
Northumberland East	William Arnson Willoughby (1888)	Conservative	1886, 1888	2nd term*	elected October 11, 1888
Northumberland West	Corelli Collard Field	Liberal	1886	1st term	
Ontario North	Isaac James Gould	Liberal	1883	2nd term	
Ontario South	John Dryden	Liberal	1879	3rd term	
Ottawa	Erskine Henry Bronson	Liberal	1886	1st term	
Oxford North	Oliver Mowat	Liberal	1872	5th term	Premier and Attorney General in Mowat ministry
Oxford South	Angus McKay	Liberal	1886	1st term	
Parry Sound	Samuel Armstrong	Independent	1886	1st term	
Peel	Kenneth Chisholm	Liberal	1873	5th term	
Perth North	John George Hess	Conservative	1883	2nd term	
Perth South	Thomas Ballantyne	Liberal	1875	4th term	
Peterborough East	Thomas Blezard	Liberal	1879	3rd term	
Peterborough West	James Robert Stratton	Liberal	1886	1st term	
Prescott	Francis Eugene Alfred Evanturel	Liberal	1886	1st term	
Prince Edward	John Allison Sprague	Liberal	1886	1st term	
Renfrew North	Thomas Murray	Liberal	1869, 1879, 1883	4th term*	
Renfrew South	John Alfred McAndrew	Liberal	1886	1st term	
Russell	Alexander Robillard	Liberal	1886	1st term	
Simcoe Centre	Orson James Phelps	Liberal	1883	2nd term	
Simcoe East	Charles Alfred Drury	Liberal	1882	3rd term	Commissioner of Agriculture in Mowat ministry after May 1, 1888
Simcoe West	Thomas Wylie	Conservative	1886	1st term	
Toronto (Note: Toronto district had 3 MPPs, elected through Limited Voting in a single contest.)	Edward Frederick Clarke	Conservative	1886	1st term	
Toronto	Henry Edward Clarke	Conservative	1883	2nd term	
Toronto	John Leys	Liberal	1886	1st term	
Victoria East	John Fell	Conservative	1883	2nd term	
Victoria West	John Saunders Cruess	Conservative	1886	1st term	
Waterloo North	Elias Weber Bingeman Snider	Liberal	1881	3rd term	
Waterloo South	Isaac Master	Liberal	1877, 1882	4th term*	
Welland	James E. Morin	Liberal	1883	2nd term	
Wellington East	Charles Clarke	Liberal	1871	5th term	
Wellington South	Donald Guthrie	Liberal	1886	1st term	
Wellington West	Absalom Shade Allan	Liberal	1886	1st term	
Wentworth North	James McMahon	Liberal	1875	4th term	
Wentworth South	Nicholas Awrey	Liberal	1879	3rd term	
York East	George Byron Smith	Liberal	1886	1st term	
York North	Joseph Henry Widdifield	Liberal	1875	4th term	resigned March 5, 1888 after being appointed sheriff
York North	Elihu James Davis (1888)	Liberal	1888	1st term	elected May 23, 1888
York West	John Taylor Gilmour	Liberal	1886	1st term	
