= 1894 Ontario general election =

Canadian provincial election

- June 26, 1894

94 seats in the 8th Legislative Assembly of Ontario 48 seats were needed for a majority
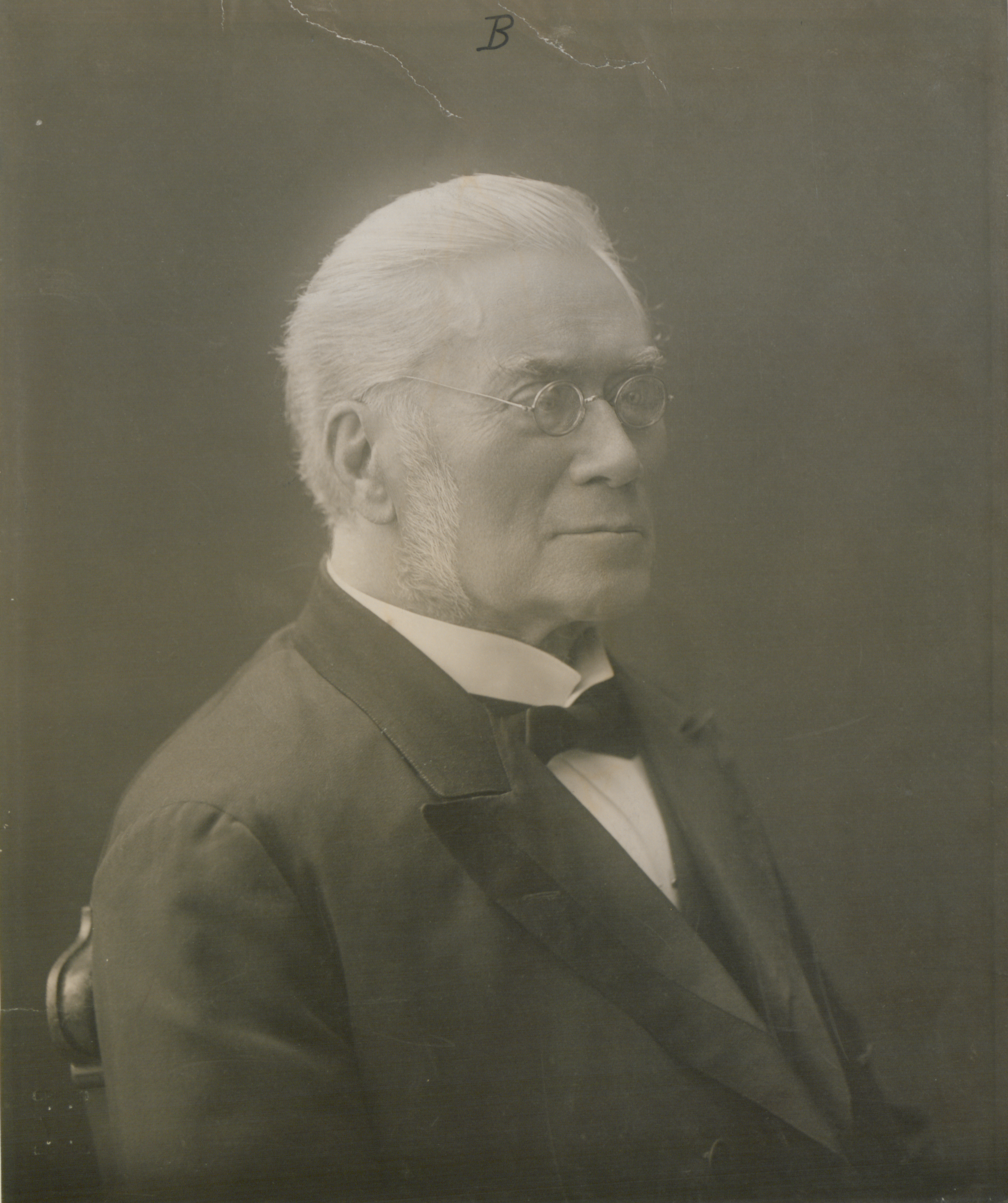

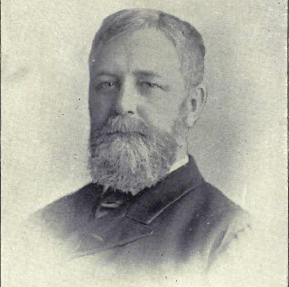
	First party	Second party
Leader	Oliver Mowat	William Ralph Meredith
Party	Liberal	Conservative
Leader since	1872	1879
Leader's seat	Oxford North	London
Last election	53	34
Seats won	45	23
Seat change	▼8	▼9
Premier before election
Oliver Mowat
Liberal
Premier after election
Oliver Mowat
Liberal

The 1894 Ontario general election was the eighth general election held in the province of Ontario, Canada. It was held on June 26, 1894, to elect the 94 Members of the 8th Legislative Assembly of Ontario ("MLAs").

The main issues were the Liberals' "Ontario System", as well as French language schools, farmer interests, support for Toronto business, woman suffrage, the temperance movement, and the demands of labour unions.

The Ontario Liberal Party, led by Oliver Mowat, formed the government for the seventh consecutive parliament, even though some of its members were elected under joint banners: either with the Patrons of Industry or the Protestant Protective Association.

The Ontario Conservative Party, led by William Ralph Meredith, formed the official opposition.

The Patrons of Industry, a farmers' organization formed in 1890, cooperated with the urban labour movement to address the political frustrations of both groups with big business. Sixteen members of the Legislative Assembly were elected with Patrons of Industry support—12 Liberals, one Conservative, and three who ran only under the "Patrons of Industry" banner.

The Protestant Protective Association (PPA) was an anti-Catholic group, associated with the Orange Order. It campaigned against the rights of Catholics and French-Canadians, and argued that Roman Catholics were attempting to take over Ontario. Nine candidates were elected with PPA support, 6 Conservatives, 1 Liberal and 2 who ran only under the PPA banner. The PPA worked most closely with the Conservative opposition.

Ottawa was given a second seat, and plurality block voting was used. Elsewhere the first-past-the-post election system was used. The Toronto district had been divided into separate single member districts, as part of the expansion of the Assembly

== Expansion of the Legislative Assembly ==
An Act passed just prior to the election increased the size of the Assembly from 91 to 94 seats:

- Toronto, a riding that returned three MLAs, was divided into Toronto East, Toronto North, Toronto South and Toronto West.
- Hamilton, a single-member constituency, was divided into Hamilton East and Hamilton West.
- Ottawa became a two-member riding.

== Results ==
Elections to the 8th Parliament of Ontario (1894)
Political party	Party leader	MPPs					Votes		
Political party	Party leader	Candidates	1890	Dissol.	1894	±	#	%	± (pp)
Liberal	Oliver Mowat	80	53		45	8▼	153,826	40.99%	8.64▼
Conservative	William Ralph Meredith	56	34		23	11▼	104,369	27.81%	12.07▼
Liberal-Patrons		26	–	–	12	12▲	44,029	11.73%	New
Conservative–P.P.A.		13	–	–	5	5▲	24,616	6.56%	New
Patrons of Industry	Joseph Longford Haycock	7	–	–	3	3▲	10,465	2.79%	New
Conservative-Patrons		7	–	–	2	2▲	11,608	3.09%	New
Liberal-P.P.A.		2	–	–	2	2▲	3,649	0.97%	New
Protestant Protective Association		8	–	–	1	1▲	11,015	2.94%	New
Independent-Conservative-PPA		1	–	–	1	1▲	2,326	0.62%	New
Independent		9	–	–	–		9,374	2.50%	New
Liberal-Equal Rights			2	–	–	2▼	Did not campaign		
Conservative-Equal Rights			2	–	–	2▼	Did not campaign		
Vacant									
Total		209	91	91	94		375,277	100.00%	
Blank and invalid ballots							3,886		
Registered voters / turnout							539,358	70.30%	0.70▲

Seats and popular vote by party of major influence
Party	Seats	Votes	Change (pp)
Liberal (Note: Straight party support only. Other MLAs sponsored by Patrons of Industry, PPA or Equal Rights Party are allocated to the latter, to show extent of influence.)	45 / 94	40.99%	-8.64
Conservative	23 / 94	27.81%	-12.07
Patrons of Industry	17 / 94	17.61%	17.61
Protestant Protective Association (Note: Associated with the Orange Order.)	9 / 94	11.09%	11.09
Equal Rights	0 / 94	0.00%	-10.00
Other	0 / 94	3.12%	2.01

Before the Legislature's first session opened, four by-elections were called. William Ralph Meredith (London) resigned to accept appointment as a judge, while the elections of James M. Savage (Algoma West), John Senn (Haldimand) and Edward H. Smythe (Kingston) were overturned on appeal. The Liberals won all four Conservative seats, thus securing a majority in the Assembly. That, together with the inability of the Patrons of Industry and the Conservatives to combine on any issue, ensured the Liberals' hold on power.

=== Synopsis of results ===
Results by riding - 1890 Ontario general election
Riding (Note: excluding Ottawa, a multi-member constituency)	Winning party						Turnout	Votes					
Name (Note: order is as given in EO reports)	1890	Party	Votes	Share	Margin #	Margin %	Turnout	Lib	Con	POI	PPA	Ind	Total
Addington	Con	Con	1,849	52.89%	202	5.78%	75.79%	1,647	1,849	–	–	–	3,496
Algoma East	Con	Lib	1,982	50.85%	66	1.69%	50.48%	1,982	1,916	–	–	–	3,898
Algoma West	Lib	Con	1,137	50.13%	6	0.26%	52.42%	1,131	1,137	–	–	–	2,268
Brant North	Lib	Lib	1,192	61.44%	444	22.89%	77.41%	1,192	–	748	–	–	1,940
Brant South	Lib	Lib	2,597	56.74%	617	13.48%	79.56%	2,597	–	–	1,980	–	4,577
Brockville	Lib	Lib	2,045	53.49%	267	6.98%	71.43%	2,045	1,778	–	–	–	3,823
Bruce Centre	Lib	L-PI	1,932	57.97%	531	15.93%	69.91%	1,401	–	1,932	–	–	3,333
Bruce North	Con	L-PP	1,369	39.35%	246	7.07%	63.61%	1,123	987	–	1,369 (Note: the Patrons of Industry incumbent Daniel McNaughton, who was elected in an 1893 byelection)	–	3,479
Bruce South	Lib	Lib	1,913	52.05%	151	4.11%	68.91%	1,913	–	1,762	–	–	3,675
Cardwell	Con	C-PI	1,888	54.93%	345	10.04%	65.18%	6	–	3,431 (Note: two Conservative candidates)	–	–	3,437
Carleton	Con	C-PI	1,986	63.61%	850	27.23%	68.07%	–	1,136	1,986	–	–	3,122
Dufferin	C-ER	PI	2,465	57.05%	609	14.09%	71.28%	–	1,856	2,465	–	–	4,321
Dundas	Con	Con	2,010	52.44%	187	4.88%	77.22%	–	2,010	1,823	–	–	3,833
Durham East	C-ER	Con	1,746	56.49%	401	12.97%	66.84%	–	1,746	–	1,345	–	3,091
Durham West	Lib	C-PP	1,646	50.94%	61	1.89%	84.42%	1,585	–	–	1,646	–	3,231
Elgin East	Con	Con	1,700	43.72%	366	9.41%	74.35%	1,334	1,700	854	–	–	3,888
Elgin West	Con	L-PI	2,851	51.55%	171	3.09%	80.82%	–	2,680	2,851	–	–	5,531
Essex North	Con	Lib	1,843	42.46%	246	5.67%	54.60%	1,843	901	1,597	–	–	4,341
Essex South	Lib	Lib	2,521	52.82%	789	16.53%	79.15%	2,521	–	520	1,732	–	4,773
Frontenac	Con	L-PI	1,517	52.26%	131	4.51%	61.94%	–	1,386	1,517	–	–	2,903
Glengarry	Lib	L-PI	2,030	55.22%	384	10.45%	70.96%	–	–	2,030	–	1,646	3,676
Grenville	Con	Con	1,826	47.88%	492	12.90%	64.99%	1,334	1,826	–	654	–	3,814
Grey Centre	Con	PPA	1,735	42.67%	542	13.33%	67.33%	1,138	–	–	2,928 (Note: 1 PPA, plus the Conservative incumbent Joseph Rorke.)	–	4,066
Grey North	Lib	Lib	1,646	38.09%	213	4.93%	66.04%	1,646	1,242	–	1,433	–	4,321
Grey South	Con	PI	2,401	59.83%	789	19.66%	69.29%	1,612	–	2,401	–	–	4,013
Haldimand	Lib	Con	1,693	50.22%	15	0.44%	76.00%	1,678	1,693	–	–	–	3,371
Halton	Con	Con	2,269	51.25%	111	2.51%	77.10%	2,158	2,269	–	–	–	4,427
Hamilton East	New	Lib	2,348	51.09%	100	2.18%	78.01%	2,348	–	–	2,248	–	4,596
Hamilton West	New	Lib	2,468	55.10%	457	10.20%	78.80%	2,468	–	–	2,011	–	4,479
Hastings East	Con	L-PI	1,574	52.70%	161	5.39%	63.32%	1,413	–	1,574	–	–	2,987
Hastings North	Con	PI	1,782	50.71%	50	1.42%	61.37%	–	1,732	1,782	–	–	3,514
Hastings West	Lib	Lib	1,473	51.41%	81	2.83%	56.05%	1,473	–	–	–	1,392	2,865
Huron East	Lib	Lib	2,129	55.95%	453	11.91%	74.44%	2,129	–	1,676	–	–	3,805
Huron South	Lib	Lib	2,335	50.24%	22	0.47%	79.03%	2,335	2,313	–	–	–	4,648
Huron West	Lib	Lib	2,263	50.85%	76	1.71%	73.39%	2,263	–	2,187	–	–	4,450
Kent East	Lib	Lib	2,365	55.03%	432	10.05%	61.62%	2,365	–	1,933	–	–	4,298
Kent West	Con	L-PI	3,106	54.52%	515	9.04%	71.59%	–	2,591	3,106	–	–	5,697
Kingston	Con	Con	1,710	50.01%	1	0.03%	80.89%	1,709	1,710	–	–	–	3,419
Lambton East	Lib	IC-PP	2,326	52.06%	184	4.12%	78.15%	2,142	–	–	2,326 (Note: Peter Duncan McCallum, elected as an Independent Conservative in an 1893 byelection)	–	4,468
Lambton West	Lib	C-PP	3,044	50.73%	88	1.47%	63.63%	2,956	–	–	3,044	–	6,000
Lanark North	L-ER	Con	1,499	50.44%	26	0.87%	75.08%	1,473	1,499	–	–	–	2,972
Lanark South	Con	Con	1,830	53.03%	623	18.05%	69.08%	1,207	1,830	–	414	–	3,451
Leeds	Con	Con	1,999	55.14%	373	10.29%	65.02%	–	1,999	1,626	–	–	3,625
Lennox	Con	Con	1,089	39.09%	112	4.02%	67.24%	977	1,089	720	–	–	2,786
Lincoln	Con	Con	2,548	51.23%	122	2.45%	76.62%	–	2,548	–	–	2,426	4,974
London	Con	Con	3,273	51.07%	137	2.14%	86.29%	3,136	3,273	–	–	–	6,409
Middlesex East	Con	L-PP	2,280	54.79%	399	9.59%	69.27%	1,881	–	–	2,280	–	4,161
Middlesex North	Lib	L-PI	2,015	51.64%	128	3.28%	75.79%	–	–	2,015	1,887	–	3,902
Middlesex West	Lib	Lib	1,970	51.46%	112	2.93%	79.59%	1,970	1,858	–	–	–	3,828
Monck	Lib	Lib	1,519	51.13%	67	2.26%	72.61%	1,519	–	–	1,452	–	2,971
Muskoka	Con	C-PP	1,803	52.44%	168	4.89%	75.02%	1,635	–	–	1,803	–	3,438
Nipissing	Lib	Lib	1,345	65.83%	647	31.67%	56.12%	1,345	–	–	–	698	2,043
Norfolk North	Lib	Lib	1,690	54.64%	287	9.28%	76.63%	1,690	–	–	1,403	–	3,093
Norfolk South	Lib	Lib	1,424	50.37%	21	0.74%	73.06%	1,424	–	1,403	–	–	2,827
Northumberland East	Con	Con	1,701	38.76%	179	4.08%	74.35%	1,522	2,867 (Note: the incumbent William Arnson Willoughby was the winning candidate)	–	–	–	4,389
Northumberland West	Lib	Lib	1,402	52.27%	146	5.44%	73.18%	1,402	1,256	–	–	24	2,682
Ontario North	Con	Lib	2,114	50.90%	75	1.81%	79.45%	2,114	2,039	–	–	–	4,153
Ontario South	Lib	Lib	2,884	52.94%	320	5.87%	82.45%	2,884	2,564	–	–	–	5,448
Oxford North	Lib	Lib	2,197	58.40%	632	16.80%	64.35%	2,197	–	–	1,565	–	3,762
Oxford South	Lib	Lib	2,454	54.21%	381	8.42%	71.16%	2,454	–	2,073	–	–	4,527
Parry Sound	Lib	L-PI	1,968	56.94%	480	13.89%	42.89%	1,488	–	1,968	–	–	3,456
Peel	Lib	Lib	2,273	54.78%	397	9.57%	75.59%	2,273	–	–	1,876	–	4,149
Perth North	Lib	Con	2,957	50.93%	108	1.86%	81.23%	2,849	2,957	–	–	–	5,806
Perth South	Lib	L-PI	2,232	50.26%	23	0.52%	75.32%	2,209	–	2,232	–	–	4,441
Peterborough East	Lib	Lib	1,621	58.37%	465	16.74%	62.43%	1,621	1,156	–	–	–	2,777
Peterborough West	Lib	Lib	2,280	60.00%	760	20.00%	75.10%	2,280	1,520	–	–	–	3,800
Prescott	Lib	Lib	2,038	71.06%	1,208	42.12%	58.42%	2,038	–	830	–	–	2,868
Prince Edward	Lib	L-PI	2,149	53.35%	667	16.56%	71.00%	–	1,482	2,149	–	397	4,028
Renfrew North	Con	Lib	1,978	54.40%	320	8.80%	75.46%	1,978	1,658	–	–	–	3,636
Renfrew South	Lib	Lib	1,802	53.41%	231	6.85%	69.55%	3,373 (Note: the incumbent John Francis Dowling received 1,571 votes)	1	–	–	–	3,374
Russell	Lib	Lib	1,976	62.47%	789	24.94%	48.17%	1,976	1,187	–	–	–	3,163
Simcoe Centre	Lib	Lib	1,170	36.76%	79	2.48%	67.88%	1,170	922	–	1,091	–	3,183
Simcoe East	Con	Con	2,021	43.21%	124	2.65%	67.07%	1,897	2,021	759	–	–	4,677
Simcoe West	Con	L-PI	1,509	51.48%	87	2.97%	58.38%	–	–	2,931 (Note: 1 Liberal; 1 Conservative)	–	–	2,931
Stormont	Lib	L-PI	1,809	47.02%	404	10.50%	62.89%	1,405	633	1,809	–	–	3,847
Toronto East	New	C-PP	3,401	66.12%	1,658	32.23%	62.00%	–	–	1,743	3,401 (Note: George Ryerson was previously elected as a Conservative in an 1893 byelection.)	–	5,144
Toronto North	New	Con	4,007	55.58%	805	11.17%	71.21%	3,202	4,007	–	–	–	7,209
Toronto South	New	Con	6,073	60.31%	2,077	20.63%	71.35%	3,996	6,073	–	–	–	10,069
Toronto West	New	Con	4,366	60.53%	1,519	21.06%	68.31%	2,847	4,366	–	–	–	7,213
Victoria East	Con	Con	1,688	54.40%	273	8.80%	60.24%	–	1,688	1,415	–	–	3,103
Victoria West	L-ER	Lib	1,785	48.64%	470	12.81%	70.62%	1,785	1,315	570	–	–	3,670
Waterloo North	Lib	Lib	2,042	51.11%	918	22.98%	64.48%	2,042	–	1,124	–	829	3,995
Waterloo South	Lib	Lib	2,212	55.63%	448	11.27%	65.85%	3,976 (Note: the incumbent John Douglas Moore was the winning candidate)	–	–	–	–	3,976
Welland	Con	Lib	2,579	50.90%	91	1.80%	78.16%	2,579	2,488	–	–	–	5,067
Wellington East	Lib	Lib	1,308	36.90%	55	1.55%	71.66%	1,308	984	1,253	–	–	3,545
Wellington South	Lib	Lib	1,993	60.39%	686	20.79%	59.46%	1,993	–	1,307	–	–	3,300
Wellington West	Lib	C-PP	1,718	54.49%	283	8.98%	65.91%	1,435	–	–	1,718	–	3,153
Wentworth North	Lib	Lib	1,449	51.31%	74	2.62%	78.75%	1,449	1,375	–	–	–	2,824
Wentworth South	Lib	Lib	1,551	55.37%	301	10.75%	83.84%	1,551	1,250	–	–	–	2,801
York East	Lib	Lib	1,959	56.23%	434	12.46%	67.24%	1,959	1,525	–	–	–	3,484
York North	Lib	Lib	2,035	54.28%	321	8.56%	61.07%	2,035	1,714	–	–	–	3,749
York West	Lib	Con	2,151	50.62%	53	1.25%	72.41%	2,098	2,151	–	–	–	4,249

= open seat
= turnout is above provincial average
= winning candidate was in previous Legislature
= incumbent had switched allegiance
= previously incumbent in another riding
= not incumbent; was previously elected to the Legislature
= incumbency arose from byelection gain
= incumbency arose from prior election result being overturned by the court
= other incumbents renominated
= joint Conservative candidate
= joint Independent Conservative candidate
= joint Liberal candidate
= joint Labour candidate
= previously an MP in the House of Commons of Canada
= multiple candidates

Results for Ottawa (2 seats)
Political party	Candidate	Votes	%	Elected	Incumbent
Liberal	George O. O'Keefe	3,381	29.99	✓	
Liberal	Erskine Henry Bronson	3,316	29.41	✓	✓
Conservative	Taylor McVeitty	2,616	23.20		
Independent	A. F. McIntyre	1,923	17.06		
Independent	T. H. Beck	39	0.65		
Majority (Note: plurality for third winning candidate)		700	6.21		
Turnout		6,841	56.11		
Registered voters		12,193			

=== Analysis ===
Party candidates in 2nd place (Note: excluding Ottawa seats)
Party in 1st place	Party in 2nd place									Total
Party in 1st place	Lib	Con	L-PI	C-PP	POI	C-PI	PPA	Ind	Lab-PI	Total
█ Liberal	2	17	9	5	2	1	5	2		43
█ Conservative	18		2			1	1	1		23
█ Liberal-PI	5	4		1		1		1		12
█ Conservative-PPA	4								1	5
█ Patrons of Industry	1	2								3
█ Conservative-PI		1				1				2
█ Liberal-PP	2									2
█ PPA				1						1
█ Independent Conservative-PPA	1									1
Total	33	24	11	7	2	4	6	4	1	92

Candidates ranked 1st to 5th place, by party
Parties	1st	2nd	3rd	4th	5th
█ Liberal	44	34	2		
█ Conservative	23	24	9		
█ Liberal-PI	12	11	2		
█ Conservative-PPA	5	7	1		
█ Patrons of Industry	3	2	2		
█ Conservative-PI	2	4	1		
█ Liberal-PP	2				
█ PPA	1	6	1		
█ Independent Conservative-PPA	1				
█ Independent		4	3	1	1
█ Labour-PI		1			

Resulting composition of the 8th Legislative Assembly of Ontario
Source		Party									Total
Source		Lib	Con	POI	L-PI	C-PI	PPA	L-PP	C-PP	IC-PP	Total
Seats retained	Incumbents returned	26	9								35
Seats retained	Open seats held	8	4								12
Seats retained	Byelection loss reversed		1								1
Seats retained	Defeated by same-party candidate	1									1
Seats changing hands	Incumbents defeated	3	4	3	6	1	1		3		21
Seats changing hands	Open seats gained	1	1		6	1		1	1		11
Seats changing hands	Byelection gains held	1	1								2
Seats changing hands	Incumbent changed allegiance	1									1
Seats changing hands	Incumbent from 3rd-party byelection gain changed allegiance							1		1	2
New seat	New MLAs	1	2								3
New seat	Previously incumbent in the Legislature	1	1						1		3
Ottawa seats	MLA returned	1									1
Ottawa seats	New MLAs	1									1
Total		45	23	3	12	2	1	2	5	1	94

=== MLAs elected by region and riding ===
Party designations are as follows:

Liberal
Conservative
Patrons of Industry and allied candidates
Protestant Protective Association and allied candidates

Northern Ontario

- Algoma East: Charles Franklin Farwell
- Algoma West: James M. Savage (Note: Election declared void because of corrupt practices. Writ for new election issued. James Conmee (Liberal) won the subsequent byelection.)
- Nipissing: John Loughrin

Ottawa Valley

- Carleton: George Nelson Kidd C-PI
- Lanark North: Richard Franklin Preston
- Lanark South: Arthur James Matheson
- Ottawa: Erskine Henry Bronson
- Ottawa: George O. O'Keefe
- Prescott: Alfred Évanturel
- Renfrew North: Henry Barr
- Renfrew South: Robert Adam Campbell
- Russell: Alexander Robillard

Saint Lawrence Valley

- Brockville: George Augustus Dana
- Dundas: James Pliny Whitney
- Glengarry: David Murdoch McPherson L-PI
- Grenville: Orlando Bush
- Kingston: Edward H. Smythe (Note: Election declared void because of corrupt practices. William Harty (Liberal) won the subsequent byelection.)
- Leeds: Walter Beatty
- Stormont: John Bennett L-PI

Central Ontario

- Addington: James Reid
- Durham East: William Armstrong Fallis
- Durham West: William Henry Reid C-PP
- Frontenac: Joseph Longford Haycock L-PI
- Hastings East: Alexander McLaren L-PI
- Hastings North: James Haggerty
- Hastings West: William Hodgins Biggar
- Lennox: Walter William Meacham
- Northumberland East: William Arnson Willoughby
- Northumberland West: Corelli Collard Field
- Peterborough East: Thomas Blezard
- Peterborough West: James Robert Stratton
- Prince Edward: John Caven L-PI
- Victoria East: John Hilliard Carnegie
- Victoria West: John McKay

Georgian Bay

- Bruce North: Daniel McNaughton L-PP
- Grey North: James Cleland
- Muskoka: George Edward Langford C-PP
- Parry Sound: William Rabb Beatty L-PI
- Simcoe Centre: Robert Paton
- Simcoe East: Andrew Miscampbell
- Simcoe West: Archibald S. Currie L-PI

Wentworth/Halton/Niagara

- Halton: William Kerns
- Hamilton East: James Taylor Middleton
- Hamilton West: John Morison Gibson
- Lincoln: James Hiscott
- Monck: Richard Harcourt
- Welland: William McCleary
- Wentworth North: John Ira Flatt
- Wentworth South: Nicholas Awrey

Midwestern Ontario

- Brant North: William Bruce Wood
- Brant South: Arthur Sturgis Hardy
- Bruce Centre: John Stevenson McDonald L-PI
- Bruce South: Reuben Eldridge Truax
- Dufferin: William Dynes
- Grey Centre: Thomas Gamey
- Grey South: David McNicol
- Haldimand: John Senn (Note: Election declared void because of corrupt practices. Writ for new election issued. Jacob Baxter (Liberal) was elected in the subsequent byelection.)
- Huron East: Thomas Gibson
- Huron South: Murdo Young McLean
- Huron West: James Thompson Garrow
- Norfolk North: Edwin Clarendon Carpenter
- Norfolk South: William Andrew Charlton
- Oxford North: Oliver Mowat
- Oxford South: Angus McKay
- Perth North: Thomas Magwood
- Perth South: John McNeill L-PI
- Waterloo North: Alexander Black Robertson
- Waterloo South: John Douglas Moore
- Wellington East: John Craig
- Wellington South: John Mutrie
- Wellington West: George Tucker C-PP (Note: Election declared void because of corrupt practices. Appeal was dismissed, and writ for new election issued. James Tucker (Conservative), brother of the ousted candidate, was elected in the subsequent byelection.)

Southwestern Ontario

- Elgin East: Charles Andrew Brower
- Elgin West: Donald Macnish L-PI
- Essex North: William J. McKee
- Essex South: William Douglas Balfour
- Kent East: Robert Ferguson
- Kent West: Thomas Letson Pardo L-PI
- Lambton East: Peter Duncan McCallum IC-PP
- Lambton West: Alfred Thomas Gurd C-PP
- London: William Ralph Meredith
- Middlesex East: William Shore L-PP
- Middlesex North: William Taylor L-PI
- Middlesex West: George William Ross

Peel/York/Ontario

- Cardwell: Edward Alfred Little C-PI
- Ontario North: Thomas William Chapple
- Ontario South: John Dryden
- Peel: Kenneth Chisholm
- Toronto East: George Ryerson C-PP
- Toronto North: George Frederick Marter
- Toronto South: Oliver Aiken Howland
- Toronto West: Thomas Crawford
- York East: John Richardson
- York North: Elihu James Davis
- York West: Joseph Wesley St. John

=== Division of ridings ===
The newly created ridings returned the following MLAs:

1890			1894		
Riding	Party	MLAs	Riding	Party	MLAs
Toronto	█ Conservative	2	Toronto East	█ Conservative-PPA	1
Toronto	█ Conservative	2	Toronto North	█ Conservative	1
Toronto	█ Liberal	1	Toronto South	█ Conservative	1
Toronto	█ Liberal	1	Toronto West	█ Conservative	1
Hamilton	█ Liberal	1	Hamilton East	█ Liberal	1
Hamilton	█ Liberal	1	Hamilton West	█ Liberal	1
Ottawa	█ Liberal	1	converted to dual-member riding	█ Liberal	2

=== Seats that changed hands ===
Elections to the 8th Parliament of Ontario – unaltered seats won/lost by party, 1890–1894
Party	1890	Gain from (loss to)																						1894
Party	1890	Lib		Con		Lib-P		C-PPA		POI		Con-P		L-PPA		PPA		ICP		L-ER		C-ER		1894
Liberal	50			6	(4)		(7)		(3)		(1)								(1)	1				41
Conservative	32	4	(6)				(5)		(1)		(1)		(2)		(2)		(1)			1		1		20
Liberal-Patrons	–	7		5																				12
Conservative–P.P.A.	–	3		1																				4
Patrons of Industry	–	1		1																		1		3
Conservative-Patrons	–			2																				2
Liberal-P.P.A.	–			2																				2
Protestant Protective Association	–			1																				1
Independent-Conservative-PPA	–	1																						1
Liberal-Equal Rights	2		(1)		(1)																			–
Conservative-Equal Rights	2				(1)						(1)													–
Total	86	16	(7)	18	(6)	–	(12)	–	(4)	–	(3)	–	(2)	–	(2)	–	(1)	–	(1)	2	–	2	–	86

Of the constituencies that were not altered, there were 38 seats that changed allegiance in the election:

Liberal to Conservative

- Algoma West
- Haldimand
- Perth North
- York West

Liberal to Liberal/Patrons of Industry

- Bruce Centre
- Middlesex North
- Parry Sound
- Perth South
- Glengarry
- Prince Edward
- Stormont

Liberal to Conservative/PPA

- Lambton West
- Durham West
- Wellington West

Liberal to Patrons of Industry

- Grey South

Liberal to Independent-Conservative/PPA

- Lambton East

Conservative to Liberal

- Algoma East
- Brockville
- Essex North
- Ontario North
- Renfrew North
- Welland

Conservative to Liberal/Patrons of Industry

- Hastings East
- Kent West
- Elgin West
- Frontenac
- Simcoe West

Conservative to Conservative/PPA

- Muskoka

Conservative to Patrons of Industry

- Hastings North

Conservative to Conservative/Patrons of Industry

- Cardwell
- Carleton

Conservative to Liberal/PPA

- Bruce North
- Middlesex East

Conservative to PPA

- Grey Centre

Liberal/Equal Rights to Liberal

- Victoria West

Liberal/Equal Rights to Conservative

- Lanark North

Conservative/Equal Rights to Conservative

- Durham East

Conservative/Equal Rights to Patrons of Industry

- Dufferin

== See also ==
- Politics of Ontario
- List of Ontario political parties
- Premier of Ontario
- Leader of the Opposition (Ontario)
