= Toronto (provincial electoral district) =

Former provincial electoral district in Ontario, Canada

Toronto East
Ontario electoral district

Defunct provincial electoral district
- Legislature: Legislative Assembly of Ontario
- District created: 1886
- District abolished: 1894
- First contested: 1886
- Last contested: 1894

Toronto was a provincial electoral district in Ontario, Canada, that existed from 1886 to 1894. It was created by merging Toronto West and Toronto East ridings into one large riding covering the entire city.

It was abolished prior to the 1894 election when it was split into four new ridings — Toronto North, Toronto South, Toronto East, and Toronto West.

The Toronto district elected three members. In each election voters were allowed to cast two votes; they were allowed to vote for two candidates (Limited voting). The three candidates with the most votes were the winners. Parties did not run more than two candidates, for fear of splitting their votes, so mixed representation was produced in each contest in the Toronto district in 1886 and 1890. No one party took all the seats.

== Members of Provincial Parliament ==
| Parliament | Years | Members | | |
|---|---|---|---|---|
Created in 1886 from the merger of Toronto West, Toronto East and the addition of the former Village of Yorkville from York East
| 6th | 1886-1890 | Edward Frederick Clarke | Henry Edward Clarke (Note: Died whilst speaking in the assembly, March 25, 1892.) | John Leys |
| 7th | 1890-1892 | Edward Frederick Clarke | Henry Edward Clarke | Joseph Tait |
| 7th | 1892 | Edward Frederick Clarke | Nelson Gordon Bigelow (Note: Died in office, November 4, 1892.) | Joseph Tait |
| 7th | 1893-1894 | Edward Frederick Clarke | George Ryerson | Joseph Tait |
Dissolved in 1894 and distributed to four new electoral districts: Toronto North, Toronto South, Toronto East and Toronto West

Sourced from the Ontario Legislative Assembly. (Note: For individual MPP's Queen's Park curriculum vitae: "Edward Frederick Clarke, MPP". Parliamentary History. Legislative Assembly of Ontario.; "Henry Edward Clarke, MPP". Parliamentary History. Legislative Assembly of Ontario.; "John Leys, MPP". Parliamentary History. Legislative Assembly of Ontario.; "Joseph Tait, MPP". Parliamentary History. Legislative Assembly of Ontario.; "Nelson Gordon Bigelow, MPP". Parliamentary History. Legislative Assembly of Ontario.; "George Sterling Ansel Ryerson, MPP". Parliamentary History. Legislative Assembly of Ontario.)

== Election results ==
The first three candidates in the poll were elected to the legislature. Percentage of votes received does not indicate percentage of voters who favoured the candidate because most or all of the Toronto voters cast two votes.

Ontario provincial by-election, February 28, 1893 Death of Nelson Gordon Bigelow
| Party | Candidate | Votes | % |
|---|---|---|---|
| Conservative | George Ryerson | 7,619 | 49.83 |
| Liberal | W.W. Ogden | 7,029 | 45.97 |
| Socialist | Thomas Phillips Thompson | 642 | 4.20 |
| Total valid votes | | 15,290 | 100.00 |
| Total rejected ballots | | – | |
| Turnout | | 15,290 | – |
| Eligible voters | | – | |
Source: Elections Ontario

Ontario provincial by-election, April 29, 1892 Death of Henry Edward Clarke
| Party | Candidate | Votes | % |
|---|---|---|---|
| Liberal | Nelson Gordon Bigelow | 4,948 | 50.88 |
| Conservative | H.E.A. Kent | 4,116 | 42.32 |
| Socialist | Thomas Phillips Thompson | 490 | 5.04 |
| Conservative | Ernest A. Macdonald | 171 | 1.76 |
| Total valid votes | | 9,725 | 100.00 |
| Total rejected ballots | | – | |
| Turnout | | 9,725 | – |
| Eligible voters | | – | |
Source: Elections Ontario

1890 Ontario general election
| Party | Candidate | Votes | % | ±% | Elected |
|---|---|---|---|---|---|
| Conservative | Edward Frederick Clarke | 5,862 | 18.81 | -33.19 | ✓ |
| Conservative | Henry Edward Clarke | 5,542 | 17.78 | -34.22 | ✓ |
| Liberal | Joseph Tait | 5,359 | 17.20 | -2.91 | ✓ |
| Liberal | Alfred McDougall | 5,197 | 16.68 | -3.43 | |
| Conservative Equal Rights | E. D. Armour | 4,502 | 14.45 | – | |
| Conservative Equal Rights | Robert Bell | 4,001 | 12.84 | – | |
| Equal Rights | Frank Moses | 703 | 2.26 | – | |
| Total valid votes | | 31,166 | 99.61 | | |
| Total rejected ballots | | 121 | 0.39 | –0.33 | |
| Turnout | | 31,287 | 72.31 | –8.60 | |
| Eligible voters | | 43,265 | | | |
Source: Elections Ontario

1886 Ontario general election
| Party | Candidate | Votes | % | Elected |
|---|---|---|---|---|
| Conservative | Edward Frederick Clarke | 7,032 | 26.28 | ✓ |
| Conservative | Henry Edward Clarke | 6,883 | 25.72 | ✓ |
| Liberal | John Leys | 5,380 | 20.11 | ✓ |
| Labour | Charles March | 4,055 | 15.15 | |
| Labour | John Roney | 3,408 | 12.74 | |
| Total valid votes | | 26,758 | 99.29 | |
| Total rejected ballots | | 192 | 0.71 | |
| Turnout | | 26,950 | 80.92 | |
| Eligible voters | | 33,306 | | |
Source: Elections Ontario

== See also ==
- List of Ontario provincial electoral districts
- Canadian provincial electoral districts
