= Nelson Gordon Bigelow =

Canadian politician

Nelson Gordon Bigelow (April 22, 1840 – November 4, 1892) was a Canadian lawyer and political figure in Ontario. He represented Toronto in the Legislative Assembly of Ontario as a Liberal in 1892.

== Biography ==
He was born in Tecumseh Township, Simcoe County, Upper Canada in 1840, the son of Hiram Bigelow, and studied at Victoria University in Cobourg. He then articled with John McNabb and Kenneth MacKenzie and was called to the bar in 1867. In 1874, he married Minerva Edna, the daughter of Delino Dexter Calvin. Bigelow was named Queen's Counsel in 1889. He served as a member of the Senate for Victoria University. Bigelow was elected to the provincial legislature in an 1892 by-election held after the death of Henry Edward Clarke.

In 1879, Bigelow and Dalton McCarthy successfully defended Emily Stowe, a female physician generally thought to be the first white female to practice medicine in Canada, against charges of attempting to procure an abortion.

He died in office in 1892.
