= Politics of Ontario =

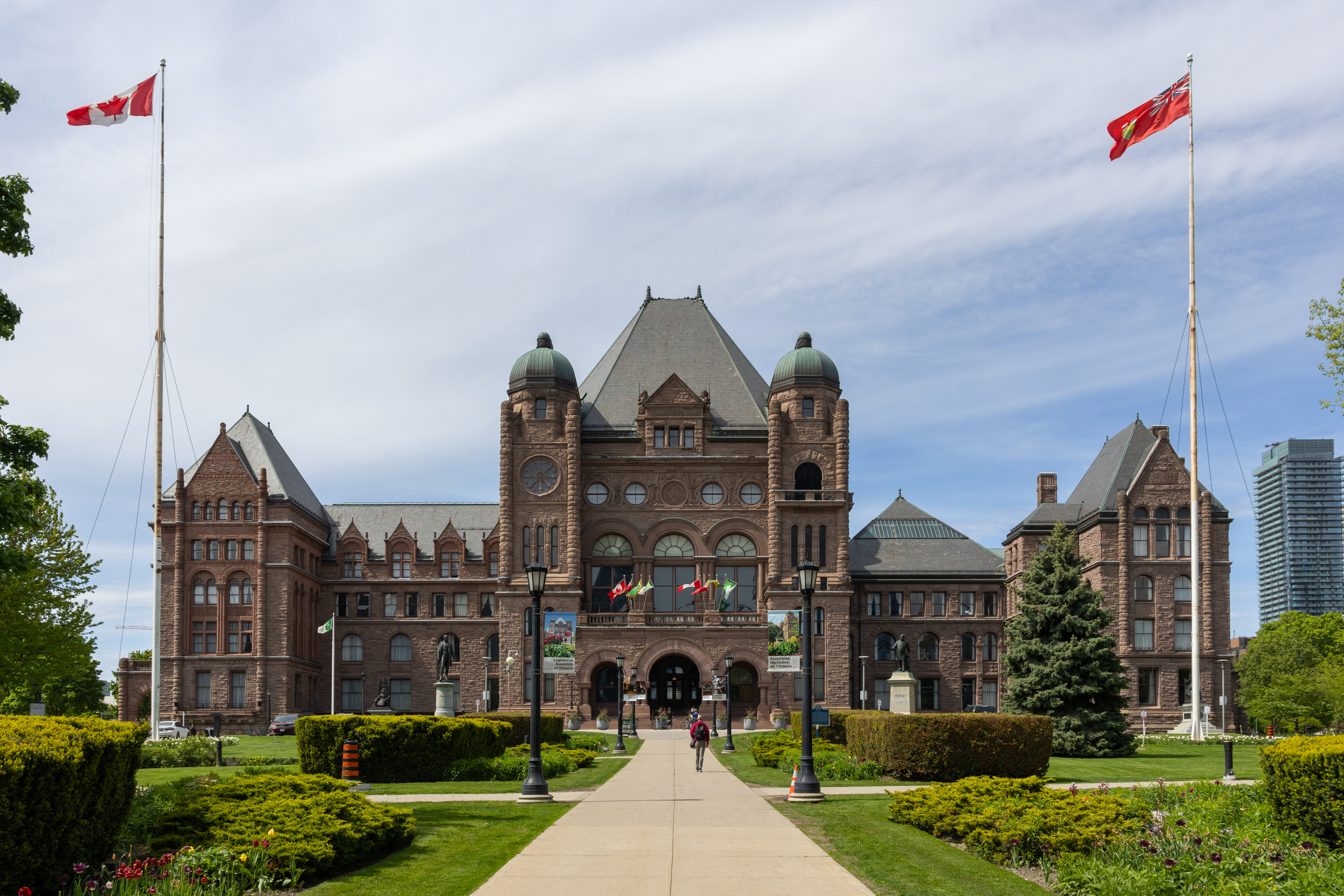
The Ontario Legislative Building, the seat of the Provincial Parliament.

The politics of Ontario functions within a framework of parliamentary democracy and a federal system of parliamentary government with strong democratic traditions. As a province within federation, Ontario's eligible voters elect their representatives to the federal government and to the provincial government separately. The two governments exercise authorities in different subject areas as assigned by the Constitution Act, 1867. On matters that are within provincial justification, the Government of Ontario exercises its authorities independently and is not subject to restrain by the federal government.

As former colonies of the United Kingdom, the politics of Ontario and the politics of Canada both operate with a multi-party system in which many of its legislative practices derive from the unwritten conventions of and precedents from the Westminster system of the parliament of the United Kingdom. While the monarch is the ceremonial head for both Canada and Ontario, in practice executive power is exercised by the respective cabinets that are accountable to their respective parliaments, the House of Commons of Canada and the Legislative Assembly of Ontario, frequently referred to by its colloquial name, Queen's Park.

The political party that wins the largest number of seats in the Ontario legislature normally forms the government, and the party's leader becomes premier of the province, i.e., the head of the government. Four political parties currently have representation in the Queen's Park:

- Progressive Conservative Party of Ontario (PC)
- Ontario New Democratic Party (NDP)
- Ontario Liberal Party
- Green Party of Ontario

While they are legally separate and distinct from their federal namesake, all four provincial parties have deep ties and collaborate extensively with their federal counterparts, (and in the case of the NDP, formal connection and structural overlap) with few crossover of provincial and federal party memberships. While only two dominant political parties, the Liberals and the Conservatives, have formed governments at the federal level, their alternation in Ontario government has been interrupted in Ontario in two occasions, once between 1919 and 1923 by the United Farmers, and more recently between 1990 and 1995 by the New Democrats.

== The Crown ==
King Charles III of the United Kingdom is also the King of Canada. As a Commonwealth realm, the Canadian monarch is shared with 14 other independent countries known as Commonwealth realms (not to be confused with the 56 members states of the Commonwealth of Nations). Within Canada, the monarch exercises power separately on behalf of the federal government, and each of the 10 provinces.

In Ontario. the powers of the Crown are vested in the monarch in right of Ontario and are exercised by the lieutenant governor. The lieutenant governor is appointed by the governor general of Canada, on the advice of the prime minister of Canada. However, the advice of the premier and Executive Council, consisting of members of the provincial cabinet, is typically binding on the lieutenant governor. The Constitution Act, 1867 requires executive power to be exercised only "by and with the Advice of the Executive Council". Therefore, the lieutenant governor acts on the advice of the premier and the cabinet in exercising the royal prerogative and granting royal assent. While the advice of the premier and Executive Council is typically binding on the lieutenant governor, the lieutenant governor may refuse to act on the advice if the premier does not clearly command the confidence of the elected Legislative Assembly. This however has not happened in Ontario. (Note: Between 1872 and 1873, Ontario's lieutenant governor William Pearce Howland twice exercised the discretion of reservation over legislations passed by the Ontario legislature.)

== Legislative power ==
The unicameral 124-member Legislative Assembly of Ontario (French: Assemblée législative de l'Ontario), and the Crown-in-Parliament (represented by the lieutenant governor) comprise the Provincial Parliament of Ontario. As government power is vested in the Crown, the role of the lieutenant governor is to grant royal assent on behalf of the monarch to legislation passed by the Legislative Assembly. The Crown does not participate in the legislative process save for signifying approval to a bill passed by the Assembly.

=== Membership ===
Officeholders, known as members of Provincial Parliament (MPPs) are elected using the first-past-the-post system.

=== Government ===
The legislature plays a role in the election of governments, as the premier and Cabinet hold office by virtue of commanding the body's confidence. Per the tenets of responsible government, Cabinet ministers are almost always elected MPPs, and account to the Legislative Assembly.

=== Opposition ===
The second largest party of parliamentary caucus is known as the Official Opposition, who typically appoint MPPs as critics to shadow ministers, and scrutinize the work of the government.

The Official Opposition is formally termed His Majesty's Loyal Opposition, to signify that, though they may be opposed to the premier and Cabinet of the day's policies, they remain loyal to Canada, which is personified and represented by the King.

== Executive power ==
The executive power is vested in the Crown and exercised "in-Council", meaning on the advice of the Executive Council; conventionally, this is the Cabinet, which is chaired by the premier and comprises ministers of the Crown.

The term Government of Ontario, or more formally, His Majesty's Government refers to the activities of the Lieutenant Governor-in-Council. The day-to-day operation and activities of the Government of Ontario are performed by the provincial departments and agencies, staffed by the non-partisan Ontario Public Service and directed by the elected government.

The premier of Ontario is the first minister of the Crown. The premier acts as the head of government for the province, chairs and selects the membership of the Cabinet, and advises the Crown on the exercise of executive power and much of the royal prerogative. As premiers hold office by virtue of their ability to command the confidence of the elected Legislative Assembly, they typically sit as a MPP and lead the largest party or a coalition in the Assembly. Once sworn in, the premier holds office until their resignation or removal by the lieutenant governor after either a motion of no confidence or defeat in a general election.

== Judicial power ==
Courts in Ontario
Court	Type	Composition method	Notes
Court of Appeal for Ontario	Appellate court	Selected federally	Appeals to the Supreme Court of Canada
Court of Ontario Ontario Superior Court of Justice Ontario Court of Justice	Trial court Superior court Court of record	Selected federally (Superior Court of Justice) Selected provincially (Court of Justice)	The Court of Ontario comprises the Superior Court of Justice and the Court of Justice
Provincial boards, commissions and tribunals	Tribunal	Selected provincially	For example: Ontario Human Rights Tribunal, or Social Justice Tribunals Ontario (SJTO), which comprises eight bodies including the Landlord and Tenant Board, Child and Family Services Review Board, and others

== Political history ==
=== Liberal hegemony before 1905 ===
Elections to the Legislative Assembly of Ontario (1867–1902) - seats won by party
Government	Conservative	Liberal								
Party	1867	1871	1875	1879	1883	1886	1890	1894	1898	1902
Liberal	41	43	50	57	48	57	53	45	51	50
Liberal-Equal Rights							2			
Liberal-Patron								12		
Liberal-P.P.A.								1		
Conservative	41	38	34	29	37	32	34	23	42	48
Liberal-Conservative			1							
Conservative-Equal Rights							2			
Conservative-P.P.A.								6		
Conservative-Patron								1		
Patrons of Industry								3		
Protestant Protective Association								2		
Conservative - Liberal		1								
Conservative - Independent			2	2					1	
Liberal - Independent			1		2					
Independent					1	1		1		
Total	82	82	88	88	88	90	91	94	94	98

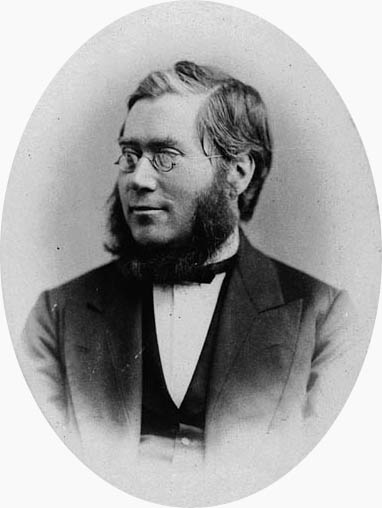
Oliver Mowat

After the Province's indecisive first election in 1867, in which the Conservative John Sandfield Macdonald became the first Premier of Ontario, the Liberals under Edward Blake gained power in 1871 which they would hold until 1905. Blake left for federal politics in 1872, and Oliver Mowat would then serve as Premier until 1896.

Secure in its predominance in the rural parts of Southwestern Ontario, the Liberals also received support through their friendship with the Roman Catholic hierarchy, their use of patronage for political ends, and their dealings with the liquor trade. Mowat's success was buttressed by Arthur Sturgis Hardy's activity as a hard-nosed and down-to-earth politician in his service, as noted by Grip:

The more wickeder he is, playing euchre and swearing and entertaining thirsty strangers, the brighter does the virtue of Mowat shine by contrast.

Acting as his own Attorney General, Mowat successfully promoted the cause of provincial sovereignty before the Judicial Committee of the Privy Council, winning key controversies over Provincial boundaries, jurisdiction over liquor licenses, trade and commerce, rivers and streams, timber, escheats and other matters.

Mowat was cautious in his approach to reform, preferring to do so by instalments. As George William Ross observed later, it reflected Mowat's cunning:

His sagacity in judging how far he could advance on any question without alarming the public mind was remarkable. Naturally conservative, when the psychological moment arrived, however, he would cast his idols to the moles and bats and lead a procession of the most advanced radicals with all the enthusiasm of a new convert.

The agrarian revolt and anti-Catholic sentiment in 1894, exemplified by the rise of the Patrons of Industry and the Protestant Protective Association, was deftly handled by the Liberals and Conservatives declining to nominate a full bank of candidates in that election and fielding candidates that were nominated by these protest groups. The Patrons and PPA ceased to exist by 1898.

After Mowat left for federal politics in 1896, the premiership was passed to Hardy, who promoted the development of New Ontario with measures for colonization and incentives for the development of lumber and mining operations. He was followed by Ross in 1899, but a series of scandals in Ross' term of office would lead to his defeat in 1905.

=== Early 20th century, 1905-1943 ===
Elections to the Legislative Assembly of Ontario (1905–1937) - seats won by party
Government	Conservative				UFO-Labour	Conservative			Liberal	
Party	1905	1908	1911	1914	1919	1923	1926	1929	1934	1937
Conservative	69	86	82	84	25	75	72	90	17	23
Liberal-Conservative			1							
Liberal	28	19	22	24	27	14	14	13	65	63
Liberal-Temperance				1						
Liberal-Prohibitionist							1			
United Farmers of Ontario					44	17	3	1	1	1
Progressive							10	4		
Liberal-Progressive							4	1	4	2
Labour		1	1	1	11	4	1	1	1	
Co-operative Commonwealth Federation									1	
Liberal-United Farmers					1					
Labour-United Farmers					1					
Soldier					1					
Liberal Independent	1			1	1		4			
Conservative Independent							2	2		
Progressive Independent							1			
Independent						1			1	
Total	98	106	106	111	111	111	112	112	90	90

Through reforming the Conservatives by establishing the Ontario Liberal-Conservative Association, reaching out to Catholics, and distancing the party from its federal counterpart, James Pliny Whitney was able to win the election of 1905. In that campaign, he stressed the necessity of public ownership of electrical development, saying, "The water power of Niagara should be as free as the air." In office, he worked to promote Ontario's industrial development through the creation of the Hydro-Electric Power Commission of Ontario, and also promoted social welfare through the passage of the first workmen's compensation law. He also maintained the party's support from the Orange Order by suppressing French-language instruction in schools through the issue of Regulation 17. He continued as Premier until his death in 1914. William Howard Hearst then took over as Premier, and served until his defeat in 1919.

The era was known for aggressive exploitation of the Province's natural resources. In 1919, Howard Ferguson (then Minister of Lands and Forests) declared, "My ambition has been to see the largest paper industry in the world established in the Province, and my attitude towards the pulp and paper industry has been directed towards assisting in bringing this about."

The rise of activism amongst farmers and workers following World War I resulted in the United Farmers of Ontario - Labour coalition government headed by E.C. Drury, which was in power from 1919 to 1923. The Conservatives then returned, and would retain control until the onset of the Great Depression, at which time the Liberals returned under Mitchell Hepburn, who would pursue aggressive policies in promoting Ontario's interests until 1943.

=== The Big Blue Machine, 1943-1985 ===
Elections to the Legislative Assembly of Ontario (1943–1981) - seats won by party
Government	Progressive Conservative											
Party	1943	1945	1948	1951	1955	1959	1963	1967	1971	1975	1977	1981
Progressive Conservative	38	66	53	79	83	71	77	69	78	51	58	70
Co-operative Commonwealth Federation	34	8	21	2	3	5						
New Democratic Party							7	20	19	38	33	21
Liberal	15	11	13	7	10	21	23	27	20	35	34	34
Liberal-Labour		3	1	1	1	1	1	1		1		
Labour-Progressive	2	2	2	1								
Liberal Independent	1											
PC Independent					1							
Total	90	90	90	90	98	98	108	117	117	125	125	125

"Bland works."

—Bill Davis explaining his success in politics.

The Progressive Conservative Party dominated Ontario's political system from 1943 to 1985 and earned the nickname of the Big Blue Machine. During this period the party was led by Red Tory premiers: George Drew, Leslie Frost, John Robarts and Bill Davis. These governments were responsible for some of the province's most progressive social legislation (including the Ontario Code of Human Rights), the creation of most of Ontario's welfare state and social programs, the creation of many Crown Corporations, and strong economic growth. Though the Conservatives were reduced to a minority government in 1975 and 1977, they stayed in power as they moved to the left of the rural-based Liberals. In addition, the Liberal and NDP opposition parties had been unwilling to cooperate. The Conservatives' were returned with a majority government in 1981.

"In the Maritimes, politics is a disease, in Quebec a religion, in Ontario a business, on the Prairies a protest and in British Columbia — entertainment."

—Allan Fotheringham, Malice in Blunderland (1982)

However, in 1985, the party came back to the right, electing Frank Miller as leader at a leadership convention, following the retirement of popular longtime Red Tory Premier Bill Davis. This shift in policy did not help the party's fortunes, nor did Davis' announcement to extend full funding for Catholic schools, the latter which alienated the Conservatives' rural supporters. After 42 years of governing Ontario, the 1985 election reduced the Tories to a minority in the Legislature, with only four seats more than the opposition Liberals. The Tories won fewer votes overall than the Liberals. Miller attempted to forge an alliance with the NDP, as Bill Davis did during his minority terms (1975–1981), but they were unable to come to an agreement. The Liberals of David Peterson and the New Democrats of Bob Rae signed an accord (not a formal coalition), ousting Frank Miller, and ending one of the longest political dynasties in Canadian history.

=== After the Machine's collapse ===
Elections to the Legislative Assembly of Ontario (1985–2022) - seats won by party
Government	Liberal		NDP	PC		Liberal				PC		
Party	1985	1987	1990	1995	1999	2003	2007	2011	2014	2018	2022	2025
Progressive Conservative	52	16	20	82	59	24	26	37	28	76	83	80
New Democratic	25	19	74	17	9	7	10	17	21	40	31	27
Liberal	48	95	36	30	35	72	71	53	58	7	8	14
Green										1	1	2
Independent											1	1
Total	125	130	130	130	103	103	107	107	107	124	124	124

==== Liberal governments under Peterson, 1985-1990 ====
David Peterson was able to re-energize his party and lead them back into office. The Liberal-NDP confidence and supply agreement of 1985-1987 allowed Peterson's Liberals to form a minority government. In exchange for supporting certain Liberal policies and not defeating Peterson's government in the Legislature, the Liberals agreed to pass certain NDP policies to which Miller had previously been unwilling to agree.

In the 1987 election, Peterson's Liberals won a substantial majority in the Legislature. Peterson's record in office was a mixed one. During his five years in power, Ontario recorded some of its best economic times; however towards the end of his tenure government spending increased. Although his government predicted a surplus, Ontario's debt was over $3 billion by the end of the year 1990.

==== Bob Rae and the "Social Contract", 1990-1995 ====
The Liberals paid dearly by calling a snap election three years into their mandate in 1990. Before Peterson called the election, his government stood at a 54% approval rating in the polls. However, the early election call turned out to be his undoing as the public interpreted it as arrogance. Several scandals also broke out after the election call and some suspected the Liberals of calling an election just to dodge the upcoming recession. In the most surprising election results in Ontario's history, the NDP was able to win a majority government, however with only 37% of the vote. This government was Ontario's second social democratic government (after the United Farmers government of Ernest Drury 1919–1923), and its track record would keep the NDP out of serious contention for power in Ontario until the present.

The NDP took power in the midst of one of the worst recessions since the Great Depression. Though they campaigned predominantly on the promise of a public auto insurance system, they backtracked on this policy, causing a split between Premier Rae and his more left-wing ministers. They increased spending in the public sector to stimulate employment and productivity. However, due to the unforeseen severity of the recession, the federal government cutbacks, the NDP was faced with lower revenues and higher expenses leading to an increasing deficit.

To combat the growing deficit, New Democrats introduced cutbacks to social spending, and the Social Contract, which forced public-sector workers to take unpaid "holidays" or "Rae Days" every year. They also introduced wage freezes The Social Contract led to most of the labour movement, especially longtime NDP ally Buzz Hargrove and his Canadian Auto Workers union (CAW), the Ontario Public Service Employees Union (OPSEU), and other public sector unions turning its backs on Bob Rae. Many union members vowed to bring his government down. Rae also introduced unpopular revenue-raising taxes and operations that hurt his election prospects. Thousands of party members resigned from the NDP and it became evident that the party was headed for a defeat in the 1995 election.

=== The "Common Sense Revolution", 1995-2003 ===
By 1995, Ontario's unemployment rate was skyrocketing and the deficit was growing bigger, leaving most people convinced that the government of Bob Rae had become ineffective after four and one-half years of an international recession. Commentators predicted an easy win for Lyn McLeod's Liberals, but the resurgent Progressive Conservative Party of Mike Harris, which had been reduced to third-party status since the 1987 election, made a comeback and won a majority. Macleod alienated voters by flip-flopping on campaign issues such as civil unions for same-sex couples. Towards the end of the campaign, the Liberals attempted to copy many Tory policies. Mike Harris, on the other hand, campaigned on a controversial agenda known as the Common Sense Revolution, promising to solve Ontario's economic woes and problems with lower taxation, smaller government and pro-business policies to create jobs. He also campaigned as a populist, which gave him the support of several working-class ridings that normally voted NDP. The 1995 election gave the PC Party a large majority, bringing the Tories back into power, however not under their traditional centrist or Red Tory agenda.

The new conservative government of Mike Harris implemented a programme of cuts to social spending and taxes (the "Common Sense Revolution") that lowered taxes for most Ontarians and especially businesses. However, it also drew controversy for "downloading" or transferring the cost of programs and responsibilities to municipalities, without supplying finances to do so.

==== Teachers' strike ====
In 1997, the teachers' union protested with a province-wide two-week strike against the Harris government's education initiatives. It was the largest teachers' strike in North American history. The teachers had a contract so the government determined that the strike was illegal. 126,000 teachers went on strike which affected 2.1 million students in the province. The strike was over the contentious issue of who holds the power to set education policy in the province. Bill 160 put control of the education system in the hands of the provincial government. It eliminated the ability of school boards and teachers' unions to set classroom and teaching conditions through collective bargaining. The bill also allowed the government to regulate class sizes, education property tax rates, teachers preparations time, the amount of time teachers and student spend in class and the use of non-certified instructors.

That year, the Harris government also amalgamated Metro Toronto and its six cities into the new "Megacity" of Toronto despite their opposition.

Mike Harris was re-elected with a majority, despite a loss of 23 seats in the 1999 election, defeating Dalton McGuinty's Liberals, which gained 5 seats (27 seats were eliminated from legislature from the 1995 election). Harris' victory was largely due to a strong campaign by the NDP, as McGuinty's Liberals were able to gain only 8.8% of the popular vote to finish at 39.9% vs. the Tory 45.1%. In addition, the emergence of the Canadian economy from the recession led to many jobs in Ontario since the time Harris had taken office, and Harris' record on tax and deficit reduction all were positive features to Harris campaign. Negative campaigning by the Tories, which featured ads claiming that McGuinty was "not up to the job" also helped Harris's re-election bid.

Afterwards, the government's critics alleged that the government's cuts to the Ministry of the Environment and privatization of water-testing laboratories led to the lack of oversight that resulted in six deaths during a 2000 E. coli outbreak in the public water system of Walkerton, Ontario. Harris first balanced budget was also revealed to have occurred because the government leased the province's 407 ETR toll highway to a private-sector consortium for 99 years. Harris stepped down as leader in 2002 and was replaced by Ernie Eves following a leadership election. Eves's government was chiefly notable for stopping Harris's unpopular plan to privatize the public electricity system, but not before some parts of the utility had been sold to private interests such as Bruce Power.

=== The Liberals return to power, 2003-2018 ===
In the October 2003 election, Dalton McGuinty led the Liberals to victory against Ernie Eves and his controversy-plagued Tories, coming in with a solid majority. McGuinty's major promises revolved around increasing health care funding, unraveling Mike Harris's education reforms, and not raising taxes.

Shortly after the election, however, the former provincial auditor undertook a study that revealed that the Harris-Eves Tories had hidden a deficit of at least $5.6 billion. Minister of Finance Greg Sorbara released a budget introducing tax increases on commodities and businesses, the introduction of a new income tax called the "Ontario Health Premium" for all but low-income Ontarians, the de-listing of health-care services from Ontario Health Insurance Plan (OHIP). The budget, along with the failure to prevent construction on the environmentally sensitive Oak Ridges Moraine after his election made the McGuinty government unpopular during its first few months. During his second month in office, McGuinty had an approval rating of only 8%, a record low. Somewhat surprisingly, even though the new Liberal government were viewed to have broken some of their promises, on December 14, 2003, 60% of Ontarians in an Ipsos-Reid Poll (on behalf of Globe and Mail/CFTO/CFRB) said they were better off governed by the Liberals now than the Conservatives under Ernie Eves.

However, things improved after his first year in office for the public opinion of the Liberals. The Ontario government was able to negotiate a national health accord with the federal government and the other provinces. Free immunizations against chicken pox and meningitis were added to the list of OHIP-covered immunizations for children. McGuinty announced plans for the creation of the "Green Belt" in the Greater Toronto Area to help control urban sprawl, and plans for the creation of a "Citizen's Assembly" to research electoral reform were also announced. The Tories on the other hand took a shift back to the centre and elected John Tory, a former aide of Bill Davis, to lead the party. John Tory stated he opposed the privatization that was advocated by Mike Harris and Ernie Eves, and supported the elimination of health premiums.

The McGuinty government also brought forward a number of regulatory initiatives including legislation to allow patrons to bring their own wine to restaurants, banning junk food in public schools, restricting smoking in public places (especially where minors are present), and requiring students to stay in school until age 18. The government also enacted changes to the Ontario Heritage Act in 2005. Following a series of high-profile maulings, the government also moved to ban Pit Bulls; a move which has generated mixed support.

In the summer of 2003, a Court of Appeal for Ontario rulings resulted in Ontario becoming the first of Canada's provinces and territories to legalize same-sex marriage. (See Same-sex marriage in Ontario.) In response to the court decision, the McGuinty Liberals updated the province's legislation relating to married couples to include same-sex couples.

In 2007 it was announced that the Ontario Citizen's Assembly on Electoral Reform had recommended that Ontario switch to a new electoral system known as mixed-member proportional representation. As a result, the Government of Ontario set the date for a referendum on the issue to be October 10, 2007, which was also the date set for the provincial election. The Government also set a "super majority" requirement that requires the support of at least 60% of voters and majority support in 60% of all Ontario ridings for the proposal to be adopted. The MMP system was rejected by Ontario voters.

In 2012, Dalton McGuinty announced his intention to resign from his post as Premier, which left the legislature hung for six months and the Liberal Leadership open. On Saturday, January 26, 2013, Kathleen Wynne prevailed at the party's convention. She became the first female Premier of Ontario and she became the first lesbian premier of any province. Wynne would win the 2014 election, holding on to a majority. Wynne campaigned on a platform that was considered further left, and included policies that had been also proposed by the NDP.

Wynne's government would continue its progressive agenda during her term as Premier, including a minimum-wage hike, an updated sex education curriculum, safe-injection sites, affordable housing, increased investment in public transit, reduced tuition for students and increased spending on health care, including free drug prescriptions for persons under 25. The Wynne government sold a majority interest in Hydro One, the electricity distribution system in Ontario, the proceeds enabling the government to balance the budget. After signing a number of contracts with renewable energy producers for electricity, electricity rates to consumers increased substantially and the Wynne government controversially moved to lower rates by renegotiating debt until the 2020s. By the end of her term in 2018, the Liberals were trailing badly in opinion polls.

=== Liberal decline, Progressive Conservatives return (2018-present) ===
The results of the 2018 Ontario General Election saw a number of significant changes in the distribution of seats among all three major parties, in some cases unprecedented in the province's history. The Liberal Party of Ontario lost the greatest number of seats, falling to just 7/126 seats, with roughly 19% of the popular vote, and losing Official Party Status for the first time in their history. The Progressive Conservative Party of Ontario, in contrast, saw a large increase in seats (and a modest increase in votes) obtaining 76/124 possible seats and roughly 41% of the popular vote. The New Democratic Party of Ontario, considered the main opponents to the PC's this election, saw a significant increase in both votes and seats in the Legislature, obtaining 40/124 seats and roughly 34% of the popular vote. The result between these two parties saw the Progressive Conservatives form a majority government, while the New Democratic Party became the Official Opposition for only the third time in its history (last seen in the Ontario general election of 1987). Finally, the 2018 Ontario Election also saw the Green Party of Ontario obtain its first-ever seat in the legislature, no less won by the party leader, Mike Schreiner, in the district of Guelph, with roughly 5% of the popular vote, province-wide.

Following the election results, there remains significant uncertainty as to the goals and agenda under the Progressive Conservatives (PC), led by Doug Ford as Premier. This was in part due to the party's last-minute abandoning of the official party platform, set off by a sudden change in leadership several months before the election due to the resignation of PC leader Patrick Brown, and the subsequent nomination battle which saw Ford elected Premier, by a narrow margin. The new "platform" under Ford's PC party was composed of a series of promises, with anticipated costs, rather than a fully costed platform as the other major parties had developed. Prior to his nomination for PCs, Ford had intended to run for the Mayoral seat in the City of Toronto (previously held by his brother, Rob Ford), moving from the role as city councillor, in opposition to the current Mayor seeking re-election, John Tory, who himself was Leader of the PC party previously, from 2004 to 2009.

The Progressive Conservatives were re-elected to a second majority government in 2022, winning 83/124 seats. The NDP again formed the official opposition, again winning 40 seats.

On January 28, 2025, Premier Doug Ford met with Edith Dumont, the Lieutenant Governor of Ontario, to dissolve the Provincial Parliament and trigger an election on February 27, 2025. The Progressive Conservatives won a third straight majority government with 80 of 124 seats, a slight decline from 2022. The NDP, under new leader Marit Stiles, formed the official opposition with 27 seats. The Liberals, under Bonnie Crombie, won 14 seats in their best result since the parties collapse in the 2018 election.

== Overview of federal politics ==
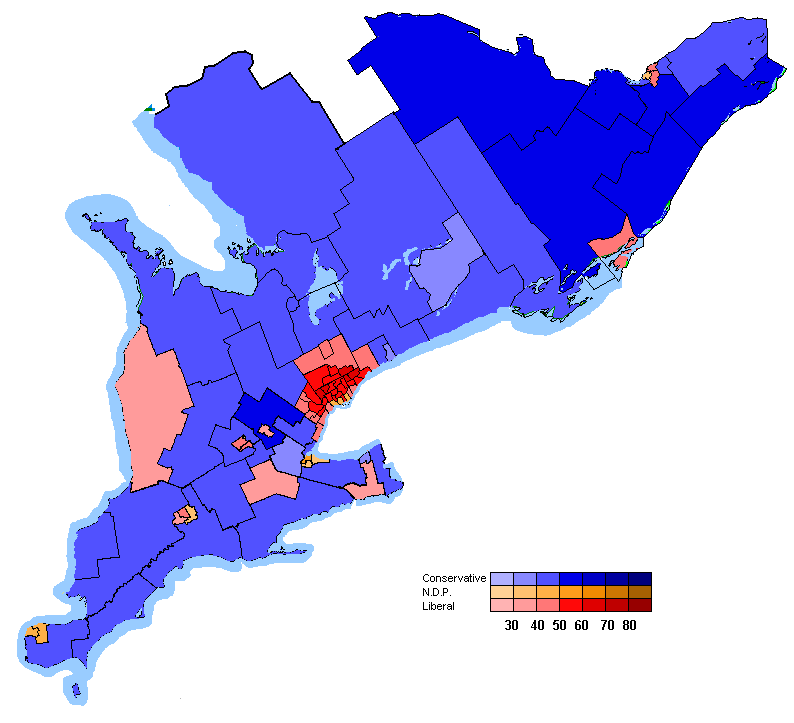
Map of Southern Ontario with the ridings shaded based on how they voted in the 2006 federal election.

Ontario's federal political trends vary despite the fact that the federal Liberals dominated the province from 1993 to 2004 against a "divided right" between the centrist Progressive Conservative Party and strongly conservative Canadian Alliance. However, the merger of these two right-wing parties into the new, right-wing Conservative Party of Canada in 2003 has reduced this Liberal dominance.

- Central and Eastern Ontario are more conservative. The exceptions are in Ottawa and Kingston, where there is a large Liberal and NDP support. Most of the region tends to vote solidly for the Ontario Progressive Conservative Party on the provincial level and for the Conservative Party of Canada on the federal level.
- The Greater Toronto Area tends to be split between Conservative and Liberal support. The inner "416" ridings (i.e., those inside Toronto) are usually Liberal and NDP, while the surrounding region "905 belt" is split between Conservatives and Liberals.
- Most of Northern Ontario is a hotbed for Liberal and NDP support. The southern border areas are more conservative than the northern areas, however, both fiscally and socially. This is most notable in the Parry Sound and Muskoka, Nipissing Districts.
- Southwestern Ontario is similar to the adjacent US Midwest, with the urban areas generally leaning left (especially Windsor, which is a union bastion and thus an NDP stronghold), and the rural areas being far more conservative.

== See also ==
- Lieutenant Governor of Ontario
- Premier of Ontario
- Legislative Assembly of Ontario
- List of Ontario general elections
- Political parties of Ontario
- Government of Ontario
- Executive Council of Ontario
- Council of the Federation
- Politics of Canada
- Political culture of Canada
