= George Ryerson =

Canadian politician

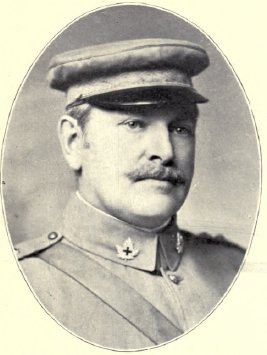

Ontario MPP
- In office 1894–1898
- Preceded by: Riding re-established
- Succeeded by: Robert Pyne
- Constituency: Toronto East
- In office 1893–1894
- Preceded by: Henry Clarke
- Succeeded by: Riding abolished
- Constituency: Toronto

Personal details
- Born: January 21, 1855 Toronto, Canada West
- Died: May 20, 1925 (aged 70) Toronto, Ontario
- Party: Conservative Party (1893-1894); Conservative-Protestant Protective Association (1894-1898)
- Spouses: Mary Amelia Crowther (m. 1882; died 1915) Elizabeth Van Hook Thomas (m. 1916)
- Relations: Egerton Ryerson, uncle; George Sterling, first cousin, once removed
- Children: 5
- Profession: Surgeon

Military service
- Allegiance: Canadian
- Branch/service: Canadian Militia
- Years of service: 1870; 1885-1917
- Rank: Assistant surgeon; deputy surgeon-general; surgeon-lieutenant-colonel; surgeon-general (honorary); colonel (honorary)
- Unit: 10th Royal Grenadiers; Canadian Army Medical Corps
- Battles/wars: North-West Rebellion

George Ansel Sterling Ryerson (January 21, 1855 – May 20, 1925) was an Ontario physician, businessman, soldier, politician, and author. He represented Toronto in the Legislative Assembly of Ontario from 1893 to 1898 as a Conservative and then Conservative-Protestant Protective Association member. He founded the Association of Medical Officers of the Canadian Militia, the St. John Ambulance Association (in Ontario), and the United Empire Loyalist Association of Ontario. He was a founder of the Canadian Red Cross Society.

== Medical and military career ==
He was born in Toronto on January 21, 1855, the son of George Ryerson and Isabella Dorcas Sterling, and attended grammar school in Galt. He began his medical training by studying in Sag Harbor, Long Island with his cousin Dr. George Augustine Sterling, Jr. (the father of future poet George Sterling). Then Ryerson attended Trinity Medical School in Toronto, receiving his MD in 1876. He continued his studies in Europe.

In 1880, he set up practice in Toronto and also lectured on eye, ear and throat diseases at Trinity Medical School. Ryerson was also surgeon at the Andrew Mercer Eye and Ear Infirmary. He was surgeon with the 10th Battalion Royal Grenadiers, serving during the North-West Rebellion. The University of Toronto Monthly summed up his accomplishments:

He did valuable work on the subject of colour blindness. He was the first in Canada to remove adenoids. He helped to organize the Toronto Clinical Society—one of the finest of the earlier Medical Societies—and the Aesculapian Club. He brought together the first stretcher-bearer section. He laid the foundation for reform of the Medical Service of the Militia, and was instrumental in founding the Canadian Red Cross Society.

Ryerson helped found the Association of Medical Officers of the Canadian Militia and served as president from 1908 to 1909. He was later named honorary colonel for the Canadian Army Medical Corps. Ryerson helped establish the St John Ambulance Association in Ontario.

== Politics ==
He was elected to the legislative assembly in an 1893 by-election and re-elected in 1894. He did not run in 1898 due to poor health. In 1896, Ryerson helped establish the United Empire Loyalist Association of Ontario. In 1902, he failed to secure nomination by the Conservative Party when he attempted to run for election in Toronto North.

== Personal life ==
On November 14, 1882, he married Mary Amelia Crowther, daughter of barrister James Crowther. They had five children: George Crowther (born 1883), Yoris Sterling (born 1886), Eric Egerton (born 1888), Arthur Connaught (born 1890), and Laura Mary (born 1893). His wife's sister, Sarah Ellen Crowther, married the Right Hon. Sir William Mulock, PC, KCMG, KC, MP, afterwards Post-Master-General and Chief Justice of Ontario. Mary Crowther Ryerson and daughter Laura were passengers aboard the Lusitania when it was sunk off the Irish coast in May 1915. Laura survived, Mary did not.

On June 8, 1916, he remarried to Elizabeth Van Hook Thomas, daughter of Edwin Ross Thomas. Ryerson retired from his medical practice in 1920 and moved to Niagara-on-the-Lake.

Ryerson's autobiography, Looking Backward was published in 1924. The University of Toronto Monthly said: "The narrative is written in easy readable style and interspersed with interesting anecdotes. His stories of pioneer days in Ontario are admirable. ... George Sterling Ryerson's compilation is a valuable stimulus to lofty ambition and noble living." The Toronto Star wrote: "Even were he not gifted with the knack of sifting the most interesting of its contents from a crowded memory, a book of memoirs from Surgeon-General Geo. Sterling Ryerson would seem to form an essential contribution to 'Canadiana.' Traveler, soldier, physician and politician, he has occupied such a memorable place in the history of his own country, and seen such of others, that there would have been a notable gap in Canadian letters if Gen. Ryerson had not written, Looking Backward, the story of his life, that is to come off the Ryerson Press this week."

Ryerson's wife Elizabeth died September 4, 1924. Ryerson died of a heart attack in Toronto on May 20, 1925.

== Publications ==
- Color Blindness in Its Relation to Railway Employees and the Public (Toronto: J. E. Bryant, [1889?])
- The After-math of a Revolution (Toronto: William Briggs, 1896)
- The Soldier and the Surgeon (Toronto: William Briggs; C. W. Coates, 1899)
- Medical and Surgical Experiences in the South African War (n.p.: [no publisher identified], [1900?])
- Association of Medical Officers of the Militia of Canada: Inaugural Address (Toronto: Association of Medical Officers of the Militia of Canada, 1908)
- Looking Backward (Toronto: Ryerson Press, 1924)
