= John Leys =

Canadian politician

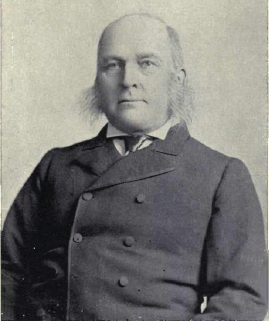

Member of the Legislative Assembly of Ontario for Toronto
- In office December 28, 1886 – April 26, 1890

Personal details
- Born: January 27, 1834 Pickering, Upper Canada
- Died: February 17, 1900 (aged 66) Mexico City
- Party: Liberal

John Leys (January 27, 1834 – February 17, 1900) was an Ontario lawyer and political figure. He represented Toronto in the Legislative Assembly of Ontario from 1886 to 1890 as a Liberal member.

He was born in Pickering, Ontario County, Upper Canada in 1834, the son of Francis Leys, a Scottish immigrant. He was educated at the Toronto Academy. Leys studied law with Angus Morrison, was called to the bar in 1860 and set up practice in Toronto. He served as solicitor for the Toronto and Nipissing Railway and was involved in the development of the Narrow Gauge Railway. In 1865, he married Helen Emma Arthurs, the daughter of William H Arthurs, a Toronto merchant. He ran unsuccessfully in Toronto East in 1882 before his election to the provincial assembly in 1886.

His brother Francis also served as a member of the provincial assembly.
