= James E. Morin =

Canadian politician

James E. Morin (May 10, 1849 – October 7, 1902) was an Ontario merchant and political figure. He represented Welland in the Legislative Assembly of Ontario as a Liberal from 1883 to 1890.

He was born in County Limerick, Ireland, the son of Michael Morin, and emigrated to Canada West with his family in 1851. Morin studied at a commercial college in Buffalo, New York. He worked in a general store owned by E. Cutler at Ridgeway, becoming owner of the business and expanding into the manufacturing of flour. In 1870, in Fort Erie, Ontario, he married Jeanette Ann Wilson. Morin was clerk for Bertie Township and auditor for Welland County. He served in the local militia during the Fenian raids and later reached the rank of lieutenant-colonel. Morin also served as justice of the peace, license commissioner and chairman of the school board. In 1891, he was named registrar for Welland County. Morin died in Ridgeway, Ontario.
