= Joseph Tait =

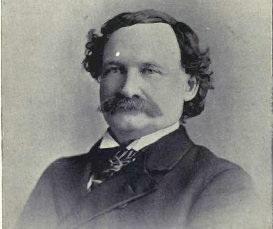

Member of the Legislative Assembly of Ontario for Toronto
- In office June 5, 1890 – May 29, 1894

Personal details
- Born: October 21, 1839 Kirkcudbrightshire, Scotland
- Died: March 18, 1911 (aged 71) Toronto, Ontario, Canada
- Party: Liberal

Joseph Tait (October 21, 1839 – March 18, 1911) was an Ontario businessman and political figure. He represented Toronto in the Legislative Assembly of Ontario as a Liberal member from 1890 to 1894.

He was born in Kirkcudbrightshire, Scotland in 1839, the son of John Tait, and trained as a baker. In 1863, he married Elizabeth McKie. Tait travelled to Pennsylvania in 1871 and then settled at Toronto in 1872, where he established a bakery. He served on the city council, was a member of the Toronto Board of Trade and a director for the Globe Printing Company. Tait was also a Methodist preacher. He married Susan Stibbard in 1876 after the death of his first wife. He was defeated by George Frederick Marter in his bid to be reelected in 1894. In 1897, Tait was named registrar for the Surrogate Court in York County, at which time he retired from business.

Tait died in 1911 after falling down an elevator shaft and fracturing his hip.
