= John Douglas Moore =

Canadian politician

John Douglas Moore (April 13, 1843 – September 19, 1917) was an Ontario farmer and political figure. He represented Waterloo South in the Legislative Assembly of Ontario from 1890 to 1898 as a Liberal member.

== Biography ==
Moore was born near Galt in North Dumfries Township, Canada West, the son of George Moore who came to Upper Canada from England in 1834. In 1878, Moore married Elizabeth Lucy Moffat. He served as reeve for North Dumfries and was warden for Waterloo County in 1878. He took over his father's farm and expanded it greatly; he also grew hops. Moore was president of the South Waterloo Farmer's Institute, the Farmer's Mutual Insurance Company and the Berlin Robe and Clothing Company. He helped establish the Galt, Preston & Hespeler Railway. In 1901, Moore was named county registrar, serving in that post until his death.
