= James Hiscott =

Canadian politician

James Hiscott (January 21, 1826 – May 26, 1917) was a Canadian politician. He represented Lincoln in Ontario, Canada in the Legislative Assembly of Ontario as a Conservative member from 1890 to 1898.

He was born in Niagara, Upper Canada in 1826, the son of Richard Hiscott, a soldier in the British army. In 1846, he married Hannah M. Reed. He served as reeve for Niagara Township and was warden for Lincoln County in 1884. Hiscott was a major in the local militia. He grew fruit on his farm near Virgil. He died on May 26, 1917, and is buried at St. Mark's Anglican Cemetery at Lincoln.
