= Equal Rights Party (Canada) =

The Equal Rights Party was a Canadian political party that ran candidates in elections in Ontario in 1890 and 1891.

It ran a joint Liberal-Equal Rights candidate in the 1890 Ontario general election.

The party nominated two candidates in the 5 March 1891 federal election.

While running in Durham East riding in Ontario, Samuel Grandy won 1,685 of the 3,431 votes cast (49.11% of the popular votes), losing narrowly to Conservative Party candidate Thomas Dixon Craig, who collected 1,746 votes.

The other Equal Rights Party candidate, W.H. Lewis, was less successful, collecting only 770 of the 9,450 votes cast (8.15% of the popular vote) in the City of Ottawa riding, a two-member constituency.

The Equal Rights party may have been associated with Dalton McCarthy, leader of the McCarthyites, a group of 10 candidates who ran in the 1896 election.

Source: Parliament of Canada, History of the Federal Electoral Ridings since 1867

== See also ==
- List of political parties in Canada
