= John Loughrin =

Canadian politician and merchant

Member of the Legislative Assembly of Ontario for Nipissing
- In office 1890–1902

Personal details
- Born: November 26, 1852 Bromley Township, Canada West
- Died: January 2, 1917 (aged 64) Mattawa, Ontario
- Party: Liberal

John Loughrin (November 26, 1852 – January 2, 1917) was an Ontario merchant and political figure. He represented Nipissing in the Legislative Assembly of Ontario from 1890 to 1902 as a Liberal member.

He was born in Bromley Township, Canada West in 1852, the son of Irish immigrants, and was educated in Pembroke. He was a justice of the peace and served as reeve of Mattawa for three years. Loughrin was also chairman of the Separate School board. He operated a general store in Mattawa. In 1884, he married Bridget Gorman. John Loughrin succeeded William Doran as Nipissing stipendiary magistrate in June 1902 at a salary of $1,600. The former MLA functioned as Master of Titles and Registrar of Deeds for Nipissing. In Renfrew County following school in Pembroke, he worked as a clerk for Murray Brothers’ stores in Beachburg and Renfrew. In 1876 he arrived in Mattawa where he joined Timmins and Gorman until 1879. In that year, he returned to T. & W. Murray at their business in Deux Rivieres until the store moved to Mattawa when it became Messrs. Murray’s & Loughrin. His public service began in 1886 as reeve in Mattawa for two years. He was also a separate school trustee. When Nipissing became an electoral district in 1890, Loughrin was selected Reform candidate and defeated Liberal-Conservative David Purvis of North Bay. In 1894 he was re-elected over Independent Conservative Steven Fournier of Sudbury and in his last electoral campaign in 1898 defeated Charles Lamarche. In 1893 he ended partnership with T. & W. Murray and in 1894 purchased the Mattawa hardware business of Messrs. Dunlop & Co.

In 1905, the Whitney government dismissed John Loughrin for partisan political activity while serving as a public officer. The Conservatives elected Charles Lamarche in East Nipissing who gave up his seat so that Frank Cochrane could contest the vacancy. Cochrane was acclaimed and immediately entered Whitney’s cabinet. Loughrin’s dismissal opened the door for Whitney to reward Lamarche. That occurred in October 1905, when Whitney appointed Lamarche police magistrate and registrar of deeds for the District of Nipissing.

Loughrin died in 1917 and was buried at Mattawa.
