= Absalom Shade Allan =

Canadian politician (1843–1928)

Ontario MPP
- In office 1886–1894
- Preceded by: Robert McKim
- Succeeded by: George Tucker
- Constituency: Wellington West

Personal details
- Born: November 26, 1843 Preston, Canada West
- Died: February 1, 1928 (aged 84) Guelph, Ontario
- Party: Liberal
- Spouse: Kate Bullock (m. 1871)
- Occupation: Merchant

Absalom Shade Allan (November 26, 1843 – February 1, 1928) was an Ontario merchant and political figure. He represented Wellington West in the Legislative Assembly of Ontario as a Liberal member from 1886 to 1894.

He was born near Preston, Canada West in 1843, the son of Alexander Allan, who came from Aberdeen, Scotland. His uncle Absalom Shade founded Galt. Allan was educated in Preston, Elora and Toronto. He taught school and then worked as a bookkeeper in Elora.

In 1868, he moved to the village of Clifford, where he opened a general store. He married Kate Bullock in 1871. Allan served as the first reeve for Clifford and was warden for Wellington County from 1884 to 1885. He was also a justice of the peace. Allan served as master in the local Masonic lodge and was a member of the Presbyterian church, serving for a time as superintendent of the village Sunday school. In 1893, he helped draft a Children's Protection Act. He was defeated in the 1894 election. In 1901, Allan was appointed sheriff for Wellington County and he moved to Guelph.
