= Elias Weber Bingeman Snider =

Canadian politician

Elias Weber Bingeman Snider (June 19, 1842 – October 15, 1921) was an Ontario businessman and political figure. He represented Waterloo North in the Legislative Assembly of Ontario as a Liberal member from 1881 to 1894.

He was born in Waterloo, Canada West in 1842, the son of a farmer and Mennonite minister, and, after leaving school at 12, worked on the family farm and then at the family's gristmills in German Mills (later Kitchener), becoming mill manager in 1862. In 1864, Snider married Nancy Weber. In 1871, he purchased a mill at St. Jacobs, replacing the millstones with rollers, which produced a better quality of flour. In 1884, he purchased a foundry at Waterloo, which produced agricultural implements and machinery. He also owned a lumber company. Snider lobbied for the establishment of forest reserves while in office, seeing the disappearing forests in Waterloo County.

A generator at his mill in St. Jacobs supplied electricity to the town. In 1900, with others, he formed the Michipicoten Falls Power Company Limited to provide hydroelectric power to mines north of Lake Superior. Snider lobbied the provincial government to build power transmission lines to make power generated at Niagara Falls available to the rest of the province. In 1903, he became the chair of the Ontario Power Commission, which laid the groundwork for the establishment of a provincial electric power utility. He married Helen Shoemaker in 1915 after the death of his first wife.

He died in Kitchener, Ontario in 1921.
