= Henry Edward Clarke =

Henry Clarke

Ontario MPP
- In office 1886–1892
- Preceded by: New riding
- Succeeded by: George Ryerson
- Constituency: Toronto
- In office 1883–1886
- Preceded by: Robert Bell
- Succeeded by: Riding abolished
- Constituency: Toronto West

Personal details
- Born: March 20, 1829; Trois-Rivières, Lower Canada
- Died: March 25, 1892 (aged 63); Toronto, Ontario
- Political party: Conservative
- Spouse: Ann Kennedy
- Profession: Businessman

Henry Edward Clarke (March 20, 1829 – March 25, 1892) was an Ontario businessman and political figure. He represented Toronto West from 1883 to 1886 and Toronto from 1886 to 1892 in the Legislative Assembly of Ontario as a Conservative.

He was born in Trois-Rivières, Lower Canada in 1829, the son of Irish immigrants. After completing his schooling, he apprenticed as a saddle and trunk maker in Montreal. In 1848, he moved to Bytown where he opened a saddlery shop. In 1853, he returned to Montreal; the following year, he opened a branch store in Toronto for a Montreal merchant and bought the operation himself in the following year. In 1856, he married Ann Kennedy. Clarke served on Toronto city council for several years before entering provincial politics.

Clarke died suddenly in 1892 while speaking in the assembly.
