= Brockville (provincial electoral district) =

Ontario electoral district

Defunct provincial electoral district
- Legislature: Legislative Assembly of Ontario
- District created: 1867
- District abolished: 1933
- First contested: 1867
- Last contested: 1929

Brockville was an electoral riding in Ontario, Canada. It was created in 1867 at the time of confederation and was abolished in 1933 before the 1934 election.

== Members of Provincial Parliament ==
Brockville
Assembly	Years	Member	Party
Brockville and Elizabethtown
1st	1867–1871	William Fitzsimmons	Conservative
2nd	1871–1875	William Fitzsimmons	Conservative
Brockville
3rd	1875–1879	Wilmot Howard Cole	Liberal
4th	1879–1883	Christopher Finlay Fraser	Liberal
5th	1883–1886	Christopher Finlay Fraser	Liberal
6th	1886–1890	Christopher Finlay Fraser	Liberal
7th	1890–1894	Christopher Finlay Fraser	Liberal
8th	1894–1898	George Augustus Dana	Liberal
9th	1898–1902	George Perry Graham	Liberal
10th	1902–1904	George Perry Graham	Liberal
11th	1905–1907	George Perry Graham	Liberal
11th	1907–1908	Albert Edward Donovan	Conservative
12th	1908–1911	Albert Edward Donovan	Conservative
13th	1911–1914	Albert Edward Donovan	Conservative
14th	1914–1919	Albert Edward Donovan	Conservative
15th	1919–1923	Donald McAlpine	Liberal
16th	1923–1926	Hezekiah Allan Clark	Conservative
17th	1926–1929	Hezekiah Allan Clark	Conservative
18th	1929–1934	Hezekiah Allan Clark	Conservative
Sourced from the Ontario Legislative Assembly
Merged into Leeds before 1934 election

== Election results ==
1929 Ontario general election
Party	Candidate	Votes	%	±%
Conservative	Hezekiah Allan Clark	4,633	60.73	+0.03
Liberal	Walter Thomas Rogers	2,996	39.27	–
Total valid votes		7,629	99.25	
Total rejected ballots		58	0.75	+0.42
Turnout		7,687	61.22	–10.70
Eligible voters		12,557		
Conservative hold		Swing		+0.02
Source: Elections Ontario

1926 Ontario general election
Party	Candidate	Votes	%	±%
Conservative	Hezekiah Allan Clark	4,881	60.69	+1.58
Prohibitionist	Claude Allan Winters	3,161	39.31	–
Total valid votes		8,042	99.67	
Total rejected ballots		27	0.33	–1.55
Turnout		8,069	71.92	+8.78
Eligible voters		11,220		
Conservative hold		Swing		+0.79
Source: Elections Ontario

1923 Ontario general election
Party	Candidate	Votes	%	±%
Conservative	Hezekiah Allan Clark	4,182	59.12	+15.59
Liberal	Donald McAlpine	2,892	40.88	–15.59
Total valid votes		7,074	98.11	
Total rejected ballots		136	1.89	–0.83
Turnout		7,210	63.13	–15.25
Eligible voters		11,420		
Conservative gain from Liberal		Swing		+15.59
Source: Elections Ontario

1919 Ontario general election
Party	Candidate	Votes	%	±%
Liberal	Donald McAlpine	4,866	56.47	–
Conservative	Albert Edward Donovan	3,751	43.53	–18.66
Total valid votes		8,617	97.28	
Total rejected ballots		241	2.72	+2.00
Turnout		8,858	78.38	–1.95
Eligible voters		11,301		
Liberal gain from Conservative		Swing		–
Source: Elections Ontario

1914 Ontario general election
Party	Candidate	Votes	%	±%
Conservative	Albert Edward Donovan	1,768	49.08	–3.91
Prohibitionist	Walter Thomas Rogers	1,302	36.15	–
Conservative	Allan Donaldson	472	13.10	–39.89
Socialist	Byron Wing	60	1.67	–3.73
Total valid votes		3,602	99.28	
Total rejected ballots		26	0.72	+0.01
Turnout		3,628	80.34	+7.19
Eligible voters		4,516		
Conservative hold		Swing		–1.95
Source: Elections Ontario

1911 Ontario general election
Party	Candidate	Votes	%	±%
Conservative	Albert Edward Donovan	2,090	52.99	–3.59
Liberal	George Edwin Smart	1,641	41.61	–1.81
Socialist	Byron Wing	213	5.40	–
Total valid votes		3,944	99.30	
Total rejected ballots		28	0.70	+0.09
Turnout		3,972	73.15	–11.94
Eligible voters		5,430		
Conservative hold		Swing		–0.89
Source: Elections Ontario

1908 Ontario general election
Party	Candidate	Votes	%	±%
Conservative	Albert Edward Donovan	2,195	56.59	+2.25
Liberal	William Senkler Buell	1,684	43.41	–2.25
Total valid votes		3,879	99.39	
Total rejected ballots		24	0.61	+0.61
Turnout		3,903	85.09	–
Eligible voters		4,587		
Conservative hold		Swing		+2.25
Source: Elections Ontario

Ontario provincial by-election, October 7, 1907 Resignation of George Perry Graham
Party	Candidate	Votes	%	±%
Conservative	Albert Edward Donovan	2,036	54.34	+6.33
Liberal	William A. Lewis	1,711	45.66	–6.33
Total valid votes		3,747	100.00	
Total rejected ballots		–		
Turnout		3,747	–	–
Eligible voters				
Conservative gain from Liberal		Swing		+6.33
Source: Elections Ontario

1905 Ontario general election
Party	Candidate	Votes	%	±%
Liberal	George Perry Graham	2,201	52.00	–2.69
Conservative	Albert Edward Donovan	2,032	48.00	+2.69
Total valid votes		4,233	99.86	
Total rejected ballots		6	0.14	–0.92
Turnout		4,239	80.74	+4.70
Eligible voters		5,250		
Liberal hold		Swing		–2.69
Source: Elections Ontario

1902 Ontario general election
Party	Candidate	Votes	%	±%
Liberal	George Perry Graham	2,192	54.69	+2.49
Conservative	D. O'Brien	1,816	45.31	–2.49
Total valid votes		4,008	98.94	
Total rejected ballots		43	1.06	+0.34
Turnout		4,051	76.05	–2.91
Eligible voters		5,327		
Liberal hold		Swing		+2.49
Source: Elections Ontario

1898 Ontario general election
Party	Candidate	Votes	%	±%
Liberal	George Perry Graham	2,232	52.20	–1.29
Conservative	John Culbert	2,044	47.80	+1.29
Total valid votes		4,276	99.28	
Total rejected ballots		31	0.72	–0.06
Turnout		4,307	78.96	+7.52
Eligible voters		5,455		
Liberal hold		Swing		–1.29
Source: Elections Ontario

1894 Ontario general election
Party	Candidate	Votes	%	±%
Liberal	George Augustus Dana	2,045	53.49	+1.13
Conservative	R. J. Jelly	1,778	46.51	–
Total valid votes		3,823	99.22	
Total rejected ballots		30	0.78	+0.25
Turnout		3,853	71.43	+9.00
Eligible voters		5,394		
Liberal hold		Swing		+0.56
Source: Elections Ontario

1890 Ontario general election
Party	Candidate	Votes	%	±%
Liberal	Christopher Finlay Fraser	1,781	52.37	–1.82
Independent Liberal	Mr. Kinney	1,620	47.63	–
Total valid votes		3,401	99.47	
Total rejected ballots		18	0.53	–0.49
Turnout		3,419	62.44	–8.89
Eligible voters		5,476		
Liberal hold		Swing		–0.91
Source: Elections Ontario

1886 Ontario general election
Party	Candidate	Votes	%	±%
Liberal	Christopher Finlay Fraser	1,844	54.19	–2.21
Conservative	D. Mansell	1,559	45.81	–
Total valid votes		3,403	98.98	
Total rejected ballots		35	1.02	+0.21
Turnout		3,438	71.33	+9.69
Eligible voters		4,820		
Liberal hold		Swing		–1.11
Source: Elections Ontario

1883 Ontario general election
Party	Candidate	Votes	%	±%
Liberal	Christopher Finlay Fraser	1,516	56.40	+4.26
Independent Conservative	Mr. Tennant	1,172	43.60	–
Total valid votes		2,688	99.19	
Total rejected ballots		22	0.81	+0.81
Turnout		2,710	61.63	+1.30
Eligible voters		4,397		
Liberal hold		Swing		+2.13
Source: Elections Ontario

1879 Ontario general election
Party	Candidate	Votes	%	±%
Liberal	Christopher Finlay Fraser	1,379	52.14	+0.63
Conservative	D. Mansell	1,266	47.86	−0.63
Total valid votes		2,645	60.33	−11.02
Eligible voters		4,384		
Liberal hold		Swing		+0.63
Source: Elections Ontario

1875 Ontario general election
Party	Candidate	Votes	%	±%
Liberal	Wilmot Howard Cole	1,247	51.51	+1.79
Conservative	William Fitzsimmons	1,174	48.49	−1.79
Turnout		2,421	71.35	+5.03
Eligible voters		3,393		
Liberal notional gain from Conservative		Swing		+1.79
Source: Elections Ontario

1871 Ontario general election
Party	Candidate	Votes	%	±%
Conservative	William Fitzsimmons	620	50.28	−0.77
Liberal	Jacob Dockstader Buell	613	49.72	+0.77
Turnout		1,233	66.33	−9.05
Eligible voters		1,859		
Conservative hold		Swing		−0.77
Source: Elections Ontario

1867 Ontario general election
Party	Candidate	Votes	%
Conservative	William Fitzsimmons	630	51.05
Liberal	Christopher Finlay Fraser	604	48.95
Total valid votes		1,234	75.38
Eligible voters		1,637	
Conservative pickup new district.			
Source: Elections Ontario
