= John Fisher Wood =

Canadian politician (1852–1899)

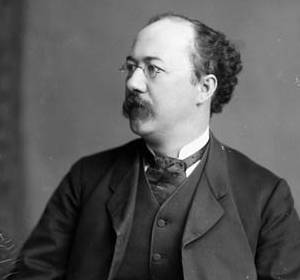
John Fisher Wood Source: Library and Archives Canada

John Fisher Wood, PC QC (October 12, 1852 – March 14, 1899) was an Ontario businessman, lawyer and politician. He represented Brockville in the House of Commons of Canada as a Liberal-Conservative from 1882 to 1899.

He was born in Addison in Canada West in 1852 (some sources say 1850), the son of a Scottish immigrant. He taught school in Farmersville (Athens). He later studied law with Christopher Finlay Fraser in Brockville, was called to the bar in 1876 and set up practice in Brockville. In 1890, he was named Queen's Counsel. He served as solicitor for the United Counties of Leeds and Grenville and was also vice-president of the Brockville, Westport and Sault Ste. Marie Railway. In 1882, he was elected to the House of Commons. He was deputy speaker in the House from 1890 to 1891. From 1892 to 1895, he served as Controller of Inland Revenue; he served as Controller of Customs from 1895 to 1896. Controllers were government ministers. Wood was part of the "nest of traitors" who forced Mackenzie Bowell to resign as prime minister in 1896.

He died in Toronto in 1899 of heart failure.

== Electoral record ==
1882 Canadian federal election: Brockville
Party	Candidate	Votes
Liberal–Conservative	John Fisher Wood	1,277
Liberal	William Henry Comstock	1,272

1887 Canadian federal election: Brockville
Party	Candidate	Votes
Liberal–Conservative	John Fisher Wood	1,823
Liberal	William Henry Comstock	1,534

1891 Canadian federal election: Brockville
Party	Candidate	Votes
Liberal–Conservative	John Fisher Wood	1,815
Liberal	Daniel Derbyshire	1,637

On Mr. Wood's nomination as Controller of Inland Revenue, 5 December 1892:

By-election on 21 December 1892
Party	Candidate	Votes
Liberal–Conservative	WOOD, John Fisher	acclaimed

Parliament of Canada
Preceded by William Fitzsimmons	Member of Parliament from Brockville; 1882–1899	Succeeded by William Henry Comstock
