= John Culbert =

John Culbert may refer to:

- John Culbert (Canadian politician)
- John Culbert (Australian politician)
