= William Henry Comstock =

Canadian politician

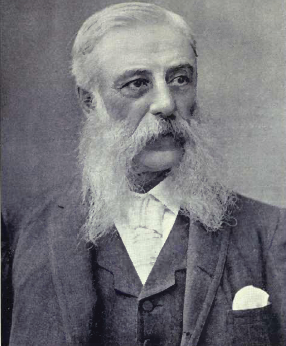

Member of the Canadian Parliament for Brockville
- In office 1899–1900
- Preceded by: John Fisher Wood
- Succeeded by: Daniel Derbyshire

Personal details
- Born: August 1, 1830 Batavia, New York, USA
- Died: March 9, 1919 (aged 88)
- Party: Liberal

William Henry Comstock (August 1, 1830 – March 9, 1919) was an American/Canadian businessman and politician.

== Pharmaceutical Company ==
Born in Batavia, New York, Comstock was educated in Flushing, New York, and on leaving school started work as a clerk. He started his business in 1854, William H. Comstock Company, Ltd., which sold patent medicine including Dr. Morse's Indian Root Pills, Dead Shot Pellets and McKenzus Dead Shot Worm Candy.

== Political career ==
Comstock was a town councillor and mayor of Brockville, Ontario. He twice ran unsuccessfully as the Liberal candidate for the House of Commons of Canada for the riding of Brockville in the 1882 and 1887 elections, before being elected in an 1899 by-election resulting from the death of the sitting MP, John Fisher Wood. He did not run in 1900.

== Electoral record ==
1882 Canadian federal election: Brockville
Party	Candidate	Votes
Liberal–Conservative	John Fisher Wood	1,277
Liberal	William Henry Comstock	1,272

1887 Canadian federal election: Brockville
Party	Candidate	Votes
Liberal–Conservative	John Fisher Wood	1,823
Liberal	William Henry Comstock	1,534

On Mr. Wood's death, 14 March 1899:

By-election on 20 April 1899
Party	Candidate	Votes
Liberal	COMSTOCK, W.H.	1,881
Conservative	WHITE, Hon. Peter	1,673
