= George Perry Graham =

Canadian politician

The Right Honourable George Perry Graham PC
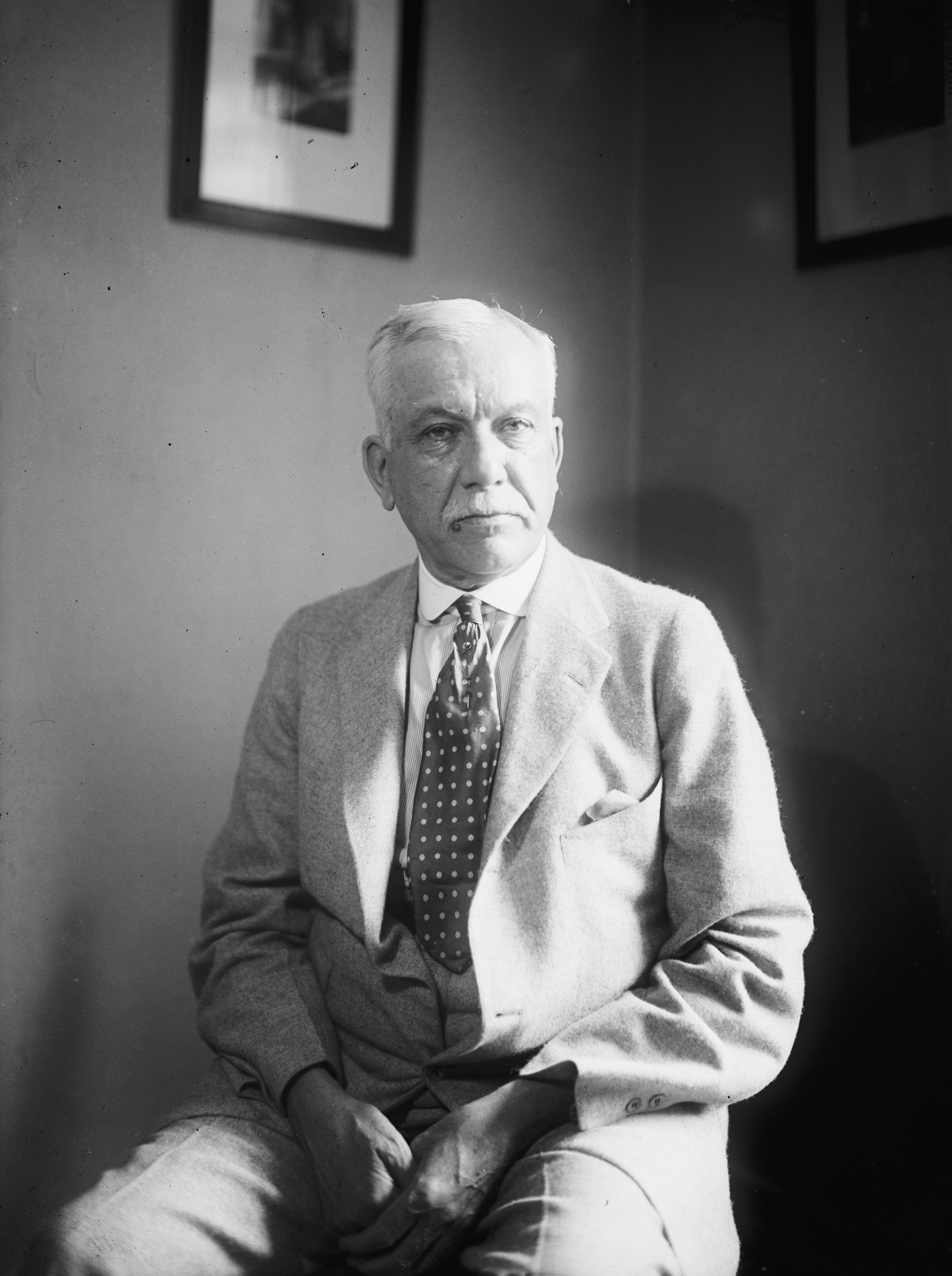
- Graham in 1922

Canadian Senator from Ontario
- In office December 20, 1926 – January 1, 1943
- Appointed by: William Lyon Mackenzie King

Member of Parliament for Essex South
- In office December 6, 1921 – October 28, 1925
- Preceded by: John Wesley Brien
- Succeeded by: Eccles James Gott

Member of Parliament for Renfrew South
- In office February 2, 1912 – December 16, 1917
- Preceded by: Thomas Andrew Low
- Succeeded by: Isaac Ellis Pedlow

Member of Parliament for Brockville
- In office September 18, 1907 – September 20, 1911
- Preceded by: Daniel Derbyshire
- Succeeded by: John Webster

Member of the Ontario Provincial Parliament for Brockville
- In office March 1, 1898 – September 5, 1907
- Preceded by: George Augustus Dana
- Succeeded by: Albert Edward Donovan
- Constituency: Brockville

Personal details
- Born: March 31, 1859 Eganville, Canada West
- Died: January 1, 1943 (aged 83) Brockville, Ontario, Canada
- Party: Liberal
- Other political affiliations: Ontario Liberal Party

George Perry Graham, PC (March 31, 1859 – January 1, 1943) was a journalist, editor and politician in Ontario, Canada.

== Background ==
In the 1898 Ontario provincial election, he was elected to the Legislative Assembly of Ontario for Brockville, and re-elected in 1902 and 1905. In 1904, he was appointed to the cabinet as Provincial Secretary by Premier George William Ross and served in that position until the Ross government lost the election of 1905.

Graham was unanimously elected leader of the Ontario Liberal Party by the party's caucus on January 25, 1907, following the resignation of George William Ross. On August 30, 1907, Graham was appointed Minister of Railways and Canals by Prime Minister Sir Wilfrid Laurier and resigned as both leader and MPP for Brockville in September.

Ross won the Brockville seat in the House of Commons of Canada in a by-election in 1907. He was defeated in the 1911 federal election that brought Robert Borden's Conservatives to power, but returned to the House of Commons in a 1912 by-election. He did not run in the 1917 election, but then was elected in Essex South in 1921.

In 1921, he served in a number of defence portfolios (Minister of Militia and Defence and Minister of the Naval Service from 1921 to 1922 and then as Minister of Defence from January 1 to April 27, 1923) in the first cabinet of William Lyon Mackenzie King. He lost his seat in the 1925 federal election, but was appointed to the Senate of Canada in 1926, and sat in that body until his death in 1943. He was appointed as a member of the King's Privy Council for Canada in 1907 and as a member of the Privy Council of the United Kingdom in 1925.

== Electoral record ==
1908 Canadian federal election: Brockville
Party	Candidate	Votes
Liberal	Hon. G. P. Graham	2,144
Conservative	John Webster	2,000

1911 Canadian federal election: Brockville
Party	Candidate	Votes
Conservative	John Webster	2,251
Liberal	Hon. G. P. Graham	2,140

== See also ==
- Canadian journalists
- Politics of Canada

Party political offices
Preceded by Sir George William Ross	Leader of the Ontario Liberal Party; 1907	Succeeded by Alexander Grant MacKay
