= Grenville-Dundas (provincial electoral district) =

Ontario electoral district

Defunct provincial electoral district
- Legislature: Legislative Assembly of Ontario
- District created: 1934
- District abolished: 1975
- First contested: 1934
- Last contested: 1971

Grenville-Dundas was an electoral riding in Ontario, Canada, that was represented in the Legislative Assembly of Ontario from 1934 to 1975. It was created in 1934 from the ridings of Grenville and Dundas. In 1975, Grenville was redistributed into the riding of Carleton-Grenville, and Dundas was redistributed into the riding of Stormont-Dundas and Glengarry.

== Members of Provincial Parliament ==
Grenville-Dundas
Assembly	Years	Member	Party
19th	1934–1937	George Holmes Challies	Conservative
20th	1937–1943	George Holmes Challies	Conservative
21st	1943–1945	George Holmes Challies	Progressive Conservative
22nd	1945–1948	George Holmes Challies	Progressive Conservative
23rd	1948–1951	George Holmes Challies	Progressive Conservative
24th	1951–1955	George Holmes Challies	Progressive Conservative
25th	1955–1959	Frederick Cass	Progressive Conservative
26th	1959–1963	Frederick Cass	Progressive Conservative
27th	1963–1967	Frederick Cass	Progressive Conservative
28th	1967–1971	Frederick Cass	Progressive Conservative
29th	1971–1975	Donald Roy Irvine	Progressive Conservative
Sourced from the Ontario Legislative Assembly
Redistributed into the ridings of Carleton-Grenville and Stormont-Dundas and Glengarry before the 1975 election
