= Grenville (provincial electoral district) =

Former provincial electoral district in Ontario, Canada

Grenville South
Ontario electoral district

Defunct provincial electoral district
- Legislature: Legislative Assembly of Ontario
- District created: 1867
- District abolished: 1933
- First contested: 1867
- Last contested: 1929

Grenville was a provincial electoral district in Ontario, Canada. In 1867 at the time of confederation, the area was split between Grenville North and Grenville South but these were merged in 1886 into one riding. In 1934, parts of Grenville were merged with the riding of Dundas to form Grenville-Dundas. In 1977 it was further redistributed to form Carleton-Grenville. It was merged into Leeds-Grenville and Stormont-Dundas and Glengarry in 1987.

== Members of Provincial Parliament ==
Grenville
Assembly	Years	Member	Party
Grenville South
1st	1867–1871	Mcneil Clarke	Conservative
2nd	1871–1872	Mcneil Clarke	Conservative
2nd	1872–1874	Christopher Finlay Fraser	Liberal
3rd	1875–1879	Christopher Finlay Fraser	Liberal
4th	1879–1883	Frederick John French	Conservative
5th	1883–1886	Frederick John French	Conservative
Grenville
6th	1886–1890	Frederick John French	Conservative
7th	1890–1894	Orlando Bush	Conservative
8th	1894–1898	Orlando Bush	Conservative
9th	1898–1902	Robert L. Joynt	Conservative
10th	1902–1904	Robert L. Joynt	Conservative
11th	1905–1908	Howard Ferguson	Conservative
12th	1908–1911	Howard Ferguson	Conservative
13th	1911–1914	Howard Ferguson	Conservative
14th	1914–1919	Howard Ferguson	Conservative
15th	1919–1923	Howard Ferguson	Conservative
16th	1923–1926	Howard Ferguson	Conservative
17th	1926–1929	Howard Ferguson	Conservative
18th	1929–1930	Howard Ferguson	Conservative
18th	1931–1934	James Alfred Sanderson	Conservative
Dundas and Grenville merged into Grenville—Dundas
19th	1934–1937	George Holmes Challies	Conservative
20th	1937–1943	George Holmes Challies	Conservative
21st	1943–1945	George Holmes Challies	Progressive Conservative
22nd	1945–1948	George Holmes Challies	Progressive Conservative
23rd	1948–1951	George Holmes Challies	Progressive Conservative
24th	1951–1955	George Holmes Challies	Progressive Conservative
25th	1955–1959	Frederick Cass	Progressive Conservative
26th	1959–1963	Frederick Cass	Progressive Conservative
27th	1963–1967	Frederick Cass	Progressive Conservative
28th	1967–1971	Frederick Cass	Progressive Conservative
29th	1971–1975	Donald Roy Irvine	Progressive Conservative
Grenville—Dundas redistributed into Carleton—Grenville
30th	1975–1977	Donald Roy Irvine	Progressive Conservative
31st	1977–1981	Norm Sterling	Progressive Conservative
32nd	1981–1985	Norm Sterling	Progressive Conservative
33rd	1985–1987	Norm Sterling	Progressive Conservative
Sourced from the Ontario Legislative Assembly
Merged into Leeds—Grenville before the 1987 election

== Election results ==
1985 Ontario general election: Carleton—Grenville
Party	Candidate	Votes	%	±%
Progressive Conservative	Norm Sterling	15,524	57.47	–7.61
Liberal	Dan Maxwell	8,019	29.69	+5.01
New Democratic	Alan White	3,468	12.84	+2.60
Total valid votes		27,011	99.55	
Total rejected ballots		122	0.45	+0.07
Turnout		27,133	56.46	–1.17
Eligible voters		48,060		
Progressive Conservative hold		Swing		–6.31
Source: Elections Ontario

1981 Ontario general election: Carleton—Grenville
Party	Candidate	Votes	%	±%
Progressive Conservative	Norm Sterling	15,202	65.09	+5.48
Liberal	Paul Raina	5,764	24.68	+1.29
New Democratic	Alan White	2,391	10.24	–6.77
Total valid votes		23,357	99.62	
Total rejected ballots		88	0.38	–0.04
Turnout		23,445	57.63	–5.67
Eligible voters		40,683		
Progressive Conservative hold		Swing		+2.09
Source: Elections Ontario

1977 Ontario general election: Carleton—Grenville
Party	Candidate	Votes	%	±%
Progressive Conservative	Norm Sterling	14,002	59.61	+5.81
Liberal	Paul Raina	5,493	23.38	+1.35
New Democratic	Jack McLachlen	3,995	17.01	–7.16
Total valid votes		23,490	99.59	
Total rejected ballots		97	0.41	+0.24
Turnout		23,587	63.30	–5.55
Eligible voters		37,263		
Progressive Conservative hold		Swing		+2.23
Source: Elections Ontario

1975 Ontario general election: Carleton—Grenville
Party	Candidate	Votes	%	±%
Progressive Conservative	Donald Roy Irvine	12,759	53.80	–9.26
New Democratic	Reg Willis	5,732	24.17	+13.72
Liberal	Howard L. Perkins	5,226	22.03	–3.15
Total valid votes		23,717	99.83	
Total rejected ballots		41	0.17	–0.36
Turnout		23,758	68.84	–1.70
Eligible voters		34,510		
Progressive Conservative hold		Swing		–11.49
Source: Elections Ontario

1971 Ontario general election: Grenville—Dundas
Party	Candidate	Votes	%	±%
Progressive Conservative	Donald Roy Irvine	11,635	63.06	+6.14
Liberal	Andy MacKenzie	4,647	25.19	–14.09
New Democratic	Frank Stocker	1,927	10.44	+6.63
Independent	René Benoit	242	1.31	–2.50
Total valid votes		18,451	99.47	
Total rejected ballots		99	0.53	+0.04
Turnout		18,550	70.55	+15.58
Eligible voters		26,294		
Progressive Conservative hold		Swing		+10.12
Source: Elections Ontario

1967 Ontario general election: Grenville—Dundas
Party	Candidate	Votes	%	±%
Progressive Conservative	Frederick Cass	7,095	56.91	–11.38
Liberal	Walter C. MacDonald	4,896	39.27	+7.57
New Democratic	René Benoit	475	3.81	–
Total valid votes		12,466	99.51	
Total rejected ballots		62	0.49	–0.26
Turnout		12,528	54.97	–9.91
Eligible voters		22,792		
Progressive Conservative hold		Swing		–9.48
Source: Elections Ontario

1963 Ontario general election: Grenville—Dundas
Party	Candidate	Votes	%	±%
Progressive Conservative	Frederick Cass	9,518	68.30	–0.48
Liberal	Mahlon W. Zeron	4,418	31.70	+0.48
Total valid votes		13,936	99.25	
Total rejected ballots		106	0.75	+0.01
Turnout		14,042	64.88	+8.88
Eligible voters		21,643		
Progressive Conservative hold		Swing		–0.48
Source: Elections Ontario

1959 Ontario general election: Grenville—Dundas
Party	Candidate	Votes	%	±%
Progressive Conservative	Frederick Cass	8,462	68.78	+5.22
Liberal	Lillian Allison	3,841	31.22	–5.22
Total valid votes		12,303	99.26	
Total rejected ballots		92	0.74	–0.10
Turnout		12,395	56.00	–3.61
Eligible voters		22,134		
Progressive Conservative hold		Swing		+5.22
Source: Elections Ontario

1955 Ontario general election: Grenville—Dundas
Party	Candidate	Votes	%	±%
Progressive Conservative	Frederick Cass	7,921	63.56	–2.46
Liberal	George Brown	4,542	36.44	+2.46
Total valid votes		12,463	99.16	
Total rejected ballots		106	0.84	+0.04
Turnout		12,569	59.61	+2.78
Eligible voters		21,087		
Progressive Conservative hold		Swing		–2.46
Source: Elections Ontario

1951 Ontario general election: Grenville—Dundas
Party	Candidate	Votes	%	±%
Progressive Conservative	George Holmes Challies	7,797	66.01	+6.71
Liberal	Graham Wells	4,014	33.99	+3.38
Total valid votes		11,811	99.19	
Total rejected ballots		96	0.81	+0.10
Turnout		11,907	56.83	+3.92
Eligible voters		20,952		
Progressive Conservative hold		Swing		+1.66
Source: Elections Ontario

1948 Ontario general election: Grenville—Dundas
Party	Candidate	Votes	%	±%
Progressive Conservative	George Holmes Challies	6,994	59.30	–2.87
Liberal	C. Allison Graham	3,609	30.60	+0.72
Co-operative Commonwealth	William J. Cook	1,191	10.10	+2.15
Total valid votes		11,794	99.29	
Total rejected ballots		84	0.71	–0.07
Turnout		11,878	52.91	–11.94
Eligible voters		22,450		
Progressive Conservative hold		Swing		–1.80
Source: Elections Ontario

1945 Ontario general election: Grenville—Dundas
Party	Candidate	Votes	%	±%
Progressive Conservative	George Holmes Challies	8,843	62.17	–2.75
Liberal	Mahlon W. Zeron	4,250	29.88	–5.20
Co-operative Commonwealth	E. H. Raycroft	1,130	7.94	–
Total valid votes		14,223	99.23	
Total rejected ballots		111	0.77	–0.06
Turnout		14,334	64.85	+16.56
Eligible voters		22,103		
Progressive Conservative hold		Swing		+1.23
Source: Elections Ontario

1943 Ontario general election: Grenville—Dundas
Party	Candidate	Votes	%	±%
Progressive Conservative	George Holmes Challies	6,829	64.92	+9.93
Liberal	J. Hume Grisdale	3,690	35.08	–9.93
Total valid votes		10,519	99.17	
Total rejected ballots		88	0.83	–0.36
Turnout		10,607	48.29	–26.55
Eligible voters		21,965		
Progressive Conservative hold		Swing		+9.93
Source: Elections Ontario

1937 Ontario general election: Grenville—Dundas
Party	Candidate	Votes	%	±%
Conservative	George Holmes Challies	9,288	54.99	+1.02
Liberal	Percy R. Barnard	7,603	45.01	–1.02
Total valid votes		16,891	98.81	
Total rejected ballots		203	1.19	+0.38
Turnout		17,094	74.84	+1.27
Eligible voters		22,842		
Conservative hold		Swing		+1.02
Source: Elections Ontario

1934 Ontario general election: Grenville—Dundas
Party	Candidate	Votes	%	±%
Conservative	George Holmes Challies	8,859	53.97	–5.20
Liberal	Charles Franklin Marselis	7,557	46.03	+5.20
Total valid votes		16,416	99.20	
Total rejected ballots		133	0.80	+0.80
Turnout		16,549	73.56	–
Eligible voters		22,496		
Conservative hold		Swing		–5.20
Source: Elections Ontario

Ontario provincial by-election, February 11, 1931 Howard Ferguson resigned to accept appointment as Canadian High Commissioner to the United Kingdom
Party	Candidate	Votes	%	±%
Conservative	James Alfred Sanderson	4,761	59.16	–5.65
Liberal	Percy Barnard	3,286	40.84	–
Total valid votes		8,047	100.00	
Total rejected ballots		–		
Turnout		8,047	–	–
Eligible voters				
Conservative hold		Swing		–2.82
Source: Elections Ontario

1929 Ontario general election
Party	Candidate	Votes	%	±%
Conservative	Howard Ferguson	4,452	64.81	+6.79
Prohibitionist	Thomas H. Bradley	2,417	35.19	–6.79
Total valid votes		6,869	98.96	
Total rejected ballots		72	1.04	+0.28
Turnout		6,941	65.93	–9.78
Eligible voters		10,528		
Conservative hold		Swing		+6.79
Source: Elections Ontario

1926 Ontario general election
Party	Candidate	Votes	%	±%
Conservative	Howard Ferguson	4,617	58.02	–
Prohibitionist	James Roy Donaldson	3,340	41.98	–
Total valid votes		7,957	99.24	
Total rejected ballots		61	0.76	–
Turnout		8,018	75.71	–
Eligible voters		10,590		
Conservative hold		Swing		–
Source: Elections Ontario

Ontario provincial by-election, August 16, 1923 Ministerial By-election
Party	Candidate	Votes
Conservative	Howard Ferguson	acclaimed
Source: Elections Ontario

1923 Ontario general election
Party	Candidate	Votes	%	±%
Conservative	Howard Ferguson	4,374	66.56	+16.06
United Farmers	William Hunter Buchanan	2,198	33.44	–16.06
Total valid votes		6,572	99.37	
Total rejected ballots		42	0.64	–2.88
Turnout		6,614	60.17	–18.49
Eligible voters		10,993		
Conservative hold		Swing		+16.06
Source: Elections Ontario

1919 Ontario general election
Party	Candidate	Votes	%	±%
Conservative	Howard Ferguson	4,125	50.50	–
United Farmers	George Arthur Payne	4,044	49.50	–
Total valid votes		8,169	96.48	
Total rejected ballots		298	3.52	–
Turnout		8,467	78.65	–
Eligible voters		10,765		
Conservative hold		Swing		–
Source: Elections Ontario

Ontario provincial by-election, January 7, 1915 Ministerial By-election
Party	Candidate	Votes
Conservative	Howard Ferguson	acclaimed
Source: Elections Ontario

1914 Ontario general election
Party	Candidate	Votes	%	±%
Conservative	Howard Ferguson	2,082	56.42	–
Independent Conservative	Fred Stapleton Evanson	1,608	43.58	–
Total valid votes		3,690	99.25	
Total rejected ballots		28	0.75	–
Turnout		3,718	81.88	–
Eligible voters		4,541		
Conservative hold		Swing		–
Source: Elections Ontario

1911 Ontario general election
Party	Candidate	Votes
Conservative	Howard Ferguson	acclaimed
Source: Elections Ontario

1908 Ontario general election
Party	Candidate	Votes	%	±%
Conservative	Howard Ferguson	1,923	50.30	–7.59
Independent Conservative	Robert L. Joynt	1,900	49.70	–
Total valid votes		3,823	99.43	
Total rejected ballots		22	0.57	–0.76
Turnout		3,845	75.72	+12.80
Eligible voters		5,078		
Conservative hold		Swing		–3.80
Source: Elections Ontario

1905 Ontario general election
Party	Candidate	Votes	%	±%
Conservative	Howard Ferguson	2,010	57.89	–3.85
Independent Liberal	S. O. McLean	1,462	42.11	–
Total valid votes		3,472	98.66	
Total rejected ballots		47	1.34	+0.58
Turnout		3,519	62.92	+1.80
Eligible voters		5,593		
Conservative hold		Swing		–1.93
Source: Elections Ontario

1902 Ontario general election
Party	Candidate	Votes	%	±%
Conservative	Robert L. Joynt	2,261	61.74	+4.31
Liberal	W. J. Bissell	1,401	38.26	–4.31
Total valid votes		3,662	99.24	
Total rejected ballots		28	0.76	+0.40
Turnout		3,690	61.11	–7.23
Eligible voters		6,038		
Conservative hold		Swing		+4.31
Source: Elections Ontario

1898 Ontario general election
Party	Candidate	Votes	%	±%
Conservative	Robert L. Joynt	2,361	57.43	+9.56
Liberal	Angus Buchanan	1,750	42.57	+7.59
Total valid votes		4,111	99.64	
Total rejected ballots		15	0.36	–0.08
Turnout		4,126	68.35	+3.36
Eligible voters		6,037		
Conservative hold		Swing		+0.98
Source: Elections Ontario

1894 Ontario general election
Party	Candidate	Votes	%	±%
Conservative	Orlando Bush	1,826	47.88	–52.12
Liberal	Angus Buchanan	1,334	34.98	–
Conservative-Protestant Protective	Joseph Scott	654	17.15	–
Total valid votes		3,814	99.56	
Total rejected ballots		17	0.44	+0.20
Turnout		3,831	64.99	+16.12
Eligible voters		5,895		
Conservative hold		Swing		–26.06
Source: Elections Ontario

1890 Ontario general election
Party	Candidate	Votes	%	±%
Conservative	Orlando Bush	1,611	57.33	–0.51
Conservative	Frederick John French	1,199	42.67	–15.17
Total valid votes		2,810	99.75	
Total rejected ballots		7	0.25	–0.91
Turnout		2,817	48.87	–14.77
Eligible voters		5,764		
Conservative hold		Swing		+7.33
Source: Elections Ontario

1886 Ontario general election
Party	Candidate	Votes	%	±%
Conservative	Frederick John French	1,978	57.84	–
Liberal	Angus Buchanan	1,428	41.75	–
Temperance	C. Richards	14	0.41	–
Total valid votes		3,420	98.84	
Total rejected ballots		40	1.16	–
Turnout		3,460	63.64	–
Eligible voters		5,437		
Conservative hold		Swing		
Source: Elections Ontario

1883 Ontario general election: Grenville South
Party	Candidate	Votes	%	±%
Conservative	Frederick John French	1,194	51.20	–1.81
Liberal	Mr. Adams	1,138	48.80	+1.81
Total valid votes		2,332	99.45	
Total rejected ballots		13	0.55	+0.55
Turnout		2,345	73.19	+2.99
Eligible voters		3,204		
Conservative hold		Swing		–1.81
Source: Elections Ontario

1879 Ontario general election
Party	Candidate	Votes	%	±%
Conservative	Frederick John French	1,205	53.01	+6.37
Liberal	Christopher Finlay Fraser	1,068	46.99	−6.37
Total valid votes		2,273	70.20	−0.84
Eligible voters		3,238		
Conservative gain from Liberal		Swing		+6.37
Source: Elections Ontario

1875 Ontario general election
Party	Candidate	Votes	%
Liberal	Christopher Finlay Fraser	1,136	53.36
Conservative	J.C. Irvine	993	46.64
Turnout		2,129	71.04
Eligible voters		2,997	
Liberal hold			
Source: Elections Ontario

Ontario provincial by-election, December 1873 Ministerial by-election
Party	Candidate	Votes
Liberal	Christopher Finlay Fraser	Acclaimed
Source: History of the Electoral Districts, Legislatures and Ministries of the Province of Ontario

Ontario provincial by-election, October 16, 1872 Previous election voided
Party	Candidate	Votes	%	±%
Liberal	Christopher Finlay Fraser	894	55.02	+6.24
Independent	Mr. Cairns	731	44.98	
Total valid votes		1,625	100.0	+4.43
Liberal gain from Conservative		Swing		+6.24
Source: History of the Electoral Districts, Legislatures and Ministries of the Province of Ontario

Ontario provincial by-election, March 30, 1872 Death of Mcneil Clarke
Party	Candidate	Votes	%
Liberal	Christopher Finlay Fraser	123	52.12
Independent	Mr. Ellis	113	47.88
Total valid votes		236	100.0
Election voided
Source: History of the Electoral Districts, Legislatures and Ministries of the Province of Ontario

1871 Ontario general election
Party	Candidate	Votes	%	±%
Conservative	Mcneil Clarke	797	51.22	−2.24
Liberal	Christopher Fraser	759	48.78	+2.24
Turnout		1,556	76.42	−4.48
Eligible voters		2,036		
Conservative hold		Swing		−2.24
Source: Elections Ontario

1867 Ontario general election
Party	Candidate	Votes	%
Conservative	Mcneil Clarke	849	53.46
Liberal	J. McCarthy	739	46.54
Total valid votes		1,588	80.90
Eligible voters		1,963	
Conservative pickup new district.			
Source: Elections Ontario

== See also ==
- List of Ontario provincial electoral districts
- Canadian provincial electoral districts
