= James Terry White =

American publisher and poet (1845–1920)

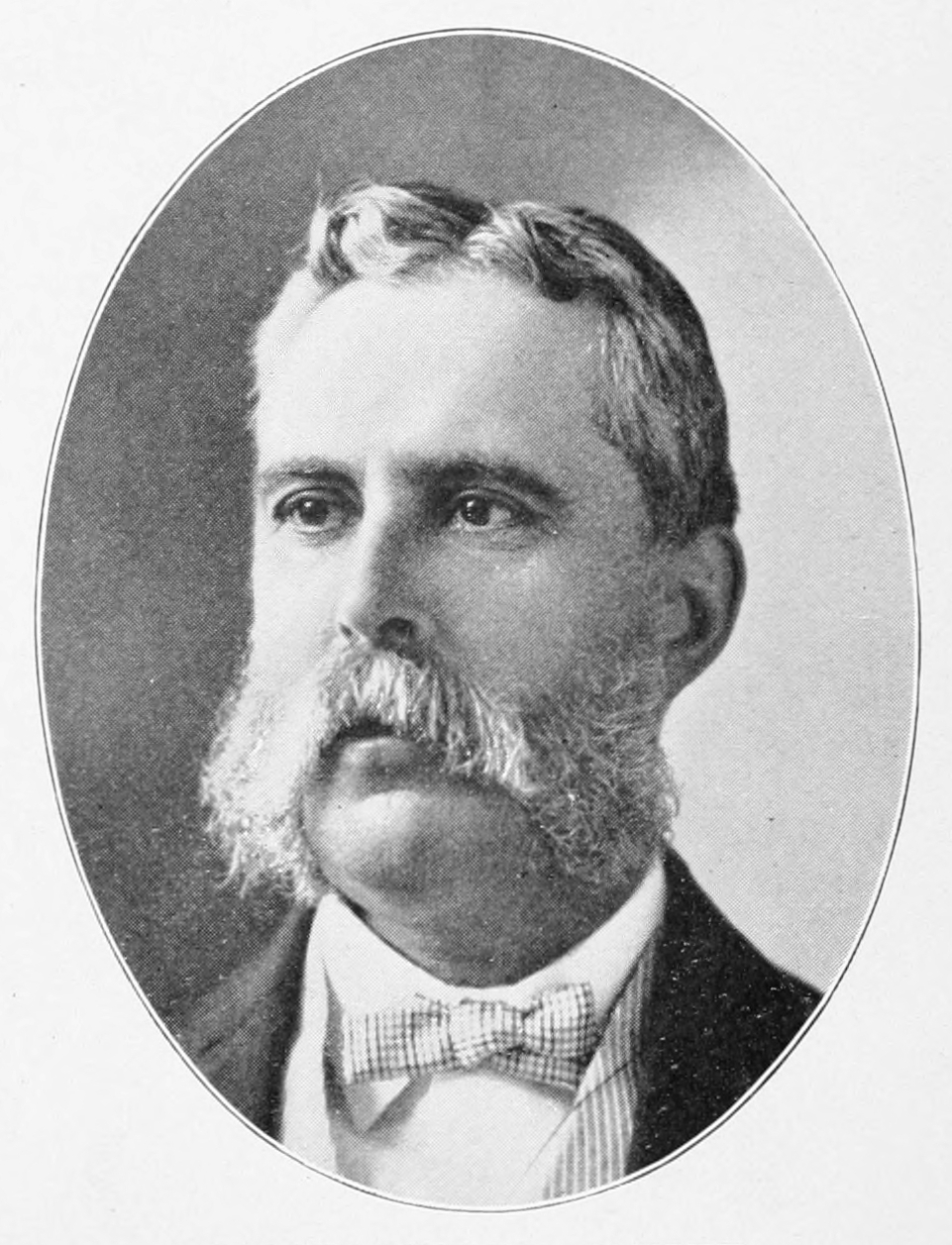
- Born: July 3, 1845; Newburyport, Massachusetts
- Died: April 3, 1920 (aged 74); Manhattan, New York
- Occupations: Publisher; poet
- Notable work: The National Cyclopaedia of American Biography

James Terry White (July 3, 1845 – April 3, 1920) was an American publisher and poet. Given his wide range of interests and involvement in various businesses and cultural activities, he was reputed to be a Renaissance man. In 1862, he joined the San Francisco publishing firm H. H. Bancroft & Co. In 1869, White founded a publishing company bearing his name, James T. White Co. in San Francisco; and in 1886, with his son George Derby White, moved its headquarters to New York City. The firm published the first edition of The National Cyclopaedia of American Biography in 1891. At the death of his son in 1939, thirty-one volumes had been published, each containing about 1,000 biographies and 450 pages.

== Family successor of corporate positions ==
White was born July 3, 1845, in Newburyport, Massachusetts. White's uncle, Andrew Judson White (1824–1898), had entered the wholesale drug business in New York and London — mainly, he, along with two other family members, obtained the rights to Dr. Morse's Indian Root Pills.

In 1891, he became a large shareholder in Yost Typewriting Company, of which, later, he became president and director. When Union acquired Yost, he became a director of the Union Typewriting Co. When Andrew J. White died in 1898, his son, Raymond Sanford White (a Yale University graduate) assumed those roles. When Raymond White died in 1903, James Terry White (his cousin), assumed the role as president of the Yost Typewriting Company, president and director of the Onondaga Mining Company, president and director of Sulphrose Company, president and director of West Coast Rubber Company. He also became a stockholder in several banks and other business corporations of New York City.

== Other affiliations ==
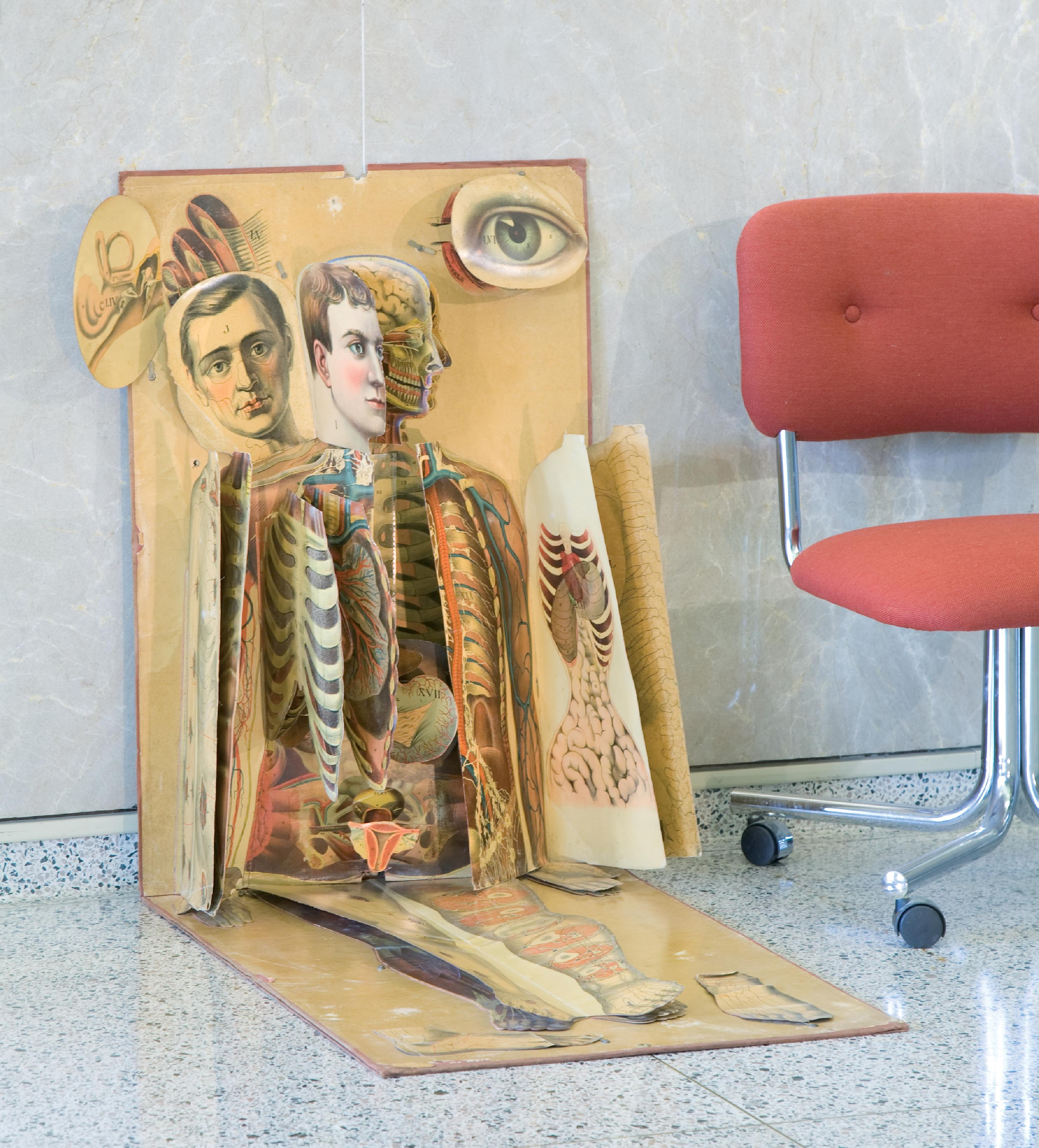
White’s Physiological Manikin

He had served as vice president of the National Press Bureau. White was an organizer and vice president of the Hudnut Pharmacy in New York City. He founded the Character Development League in New York City and, in 1885, invented White’s Physiological Manikin, a life-size illustration of human anatomical structure, surgical techniques, and even prenatal development despite the gender being male.

== Selected publications ==
As author

- Flowers from Arcadia (1884) OCLC 14757573
- A Bouquet of California Flowers (1883) OCLC 21650990
- Captive Memories (1897) OCLC 1981536
- Christmas Greeting (1883) OCLC 58879585
- A Garden of Remembrance (1917) OCLC 16838347, 647376327

As publisher

- The National Cyclopaedia of American Biography, 63 volumes, published from 1892 to 1984 OCLC 1759175
