= Donald McAlpine (politician) =

Canadian politician

Ontario MPP
- In office 1919–1923
- Preceded by: Albert Edward Donovan
- Succeeded by: Hezekiah Allan Clark
- Constituency: Brockville

Personal details
- Born: December 5, 1869 Vankleek Hill, Ontario
- Died: May 12, 1925 (aged 55) Leeds, Ontario
- Party: Liberal
- Occupation: Farmer

Donald McAlpine (December 5, 1869 – May 12, 1925) was an Ontario farmer, veterinarian and political figure. He represented Brockville in the Legislative Assembly of Ontario from 1919 to 1923.

He was born in Vankleek Hill, Ontario, the son of John McAlpine and Annie Grant, and was educated at McGill University, receiving a DVS. He was a member of the Freemasons. He died on May 12, 1925.
