= James Crawford (Canadian politician) =

Canadian politician

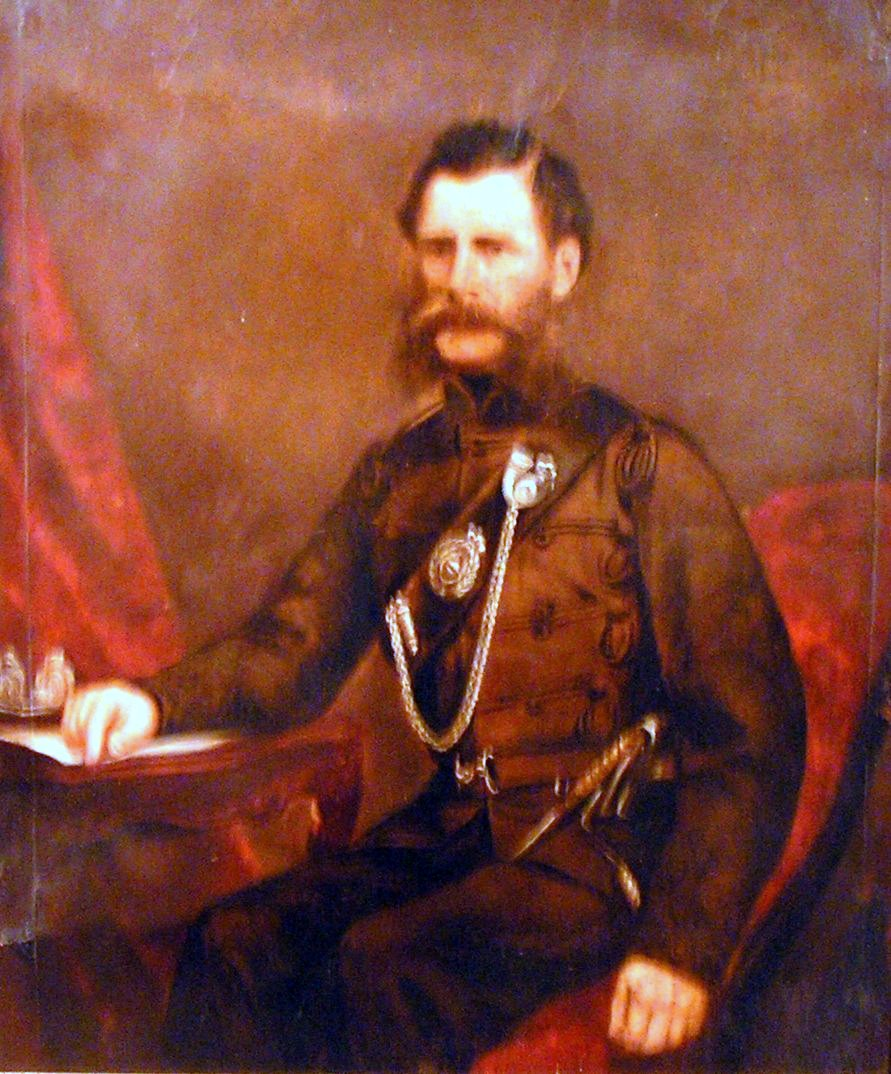
- Col. Crawford, 41st Brockville Battalion

Member of Parliament for Brockville
- In office 1867–1872
- Preceded by: Riding established
- Succeeded by: Jacob Dockstader Buell

Personal details
- Born: October 31, 1816 County Cavan, Ireland
- Died: November 22, 1878 (aged 62) Brockville, Ontario, Canada
- Party: Conservative
- Relatives: George Crawford (father)
- Occupation: Businessman, soldier, politician

Military service
- Allegiance: Upper Canada; Canada
- Branch/service: Canadian militia
- Years of service: 1838 - 1870s
- Rank: Captain; Colonel
- Unit: Incorporated Militia; Brockville Rifle Company
- Commands: 41st Brockville Battalion
- Battles/wars: Rebellion of 1838; Fenian Raids

James Crawford (October 31, 1816 – November 22, 1878) was an Ontario businessman and political figure. He represented Brockville in the 1st Canadian Parliament as a Conservative member.

He was born in County Cavan, Ireland in 1816, the oldest son of George Crawford, and came to Upper Canada with his family during the 1820s. Crawford served in Cornwall, Ontario during the Upper Canada Rebellion and was a member of the Incorporated Militia of Upper Canada for several years. He served as lieutenant-colonel in the local militia from 1866 to 1871. Crawford was a contractor involved in the construction of several canals on the Saint Lawrence River.

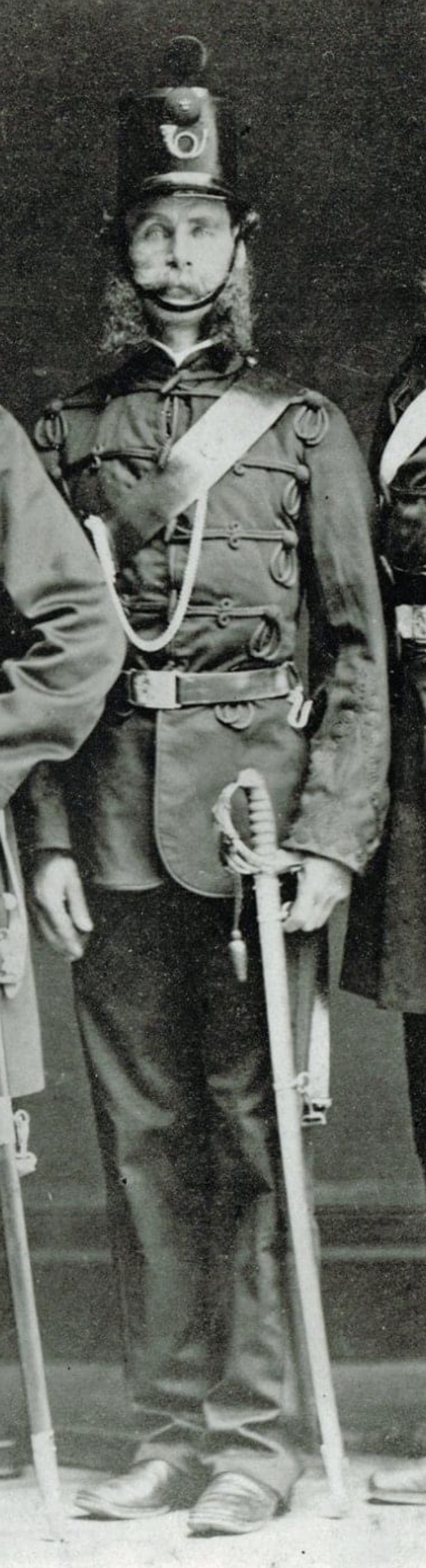
Captain James Crawford, Brockville Rifle Company, 1866

Crawford married a Miss Harris. He died in Brockville at the age of 62.

His brother John served as Lieutenant-Governor of Ontario.

== Electoral record ==
1867 Canadian federal election: Brockville
Party	Candidate	Votes
Conservative	James Crawford	690
Unknown	F. W. H. Chambers	521
Eligible voters		1,641
Source: Canadian Parliamentary Guide, 18711867 Return of the Elections to House of Commons

Parliament of Canada
Preceded by The electoral district was created by the British North America Act, 1867.	Member of Parliament for Brockville; 1867–1872	Succeeded by Jacob Dockstader Buell
