= Frederick Cass =

Canadian politician

Fred Cass
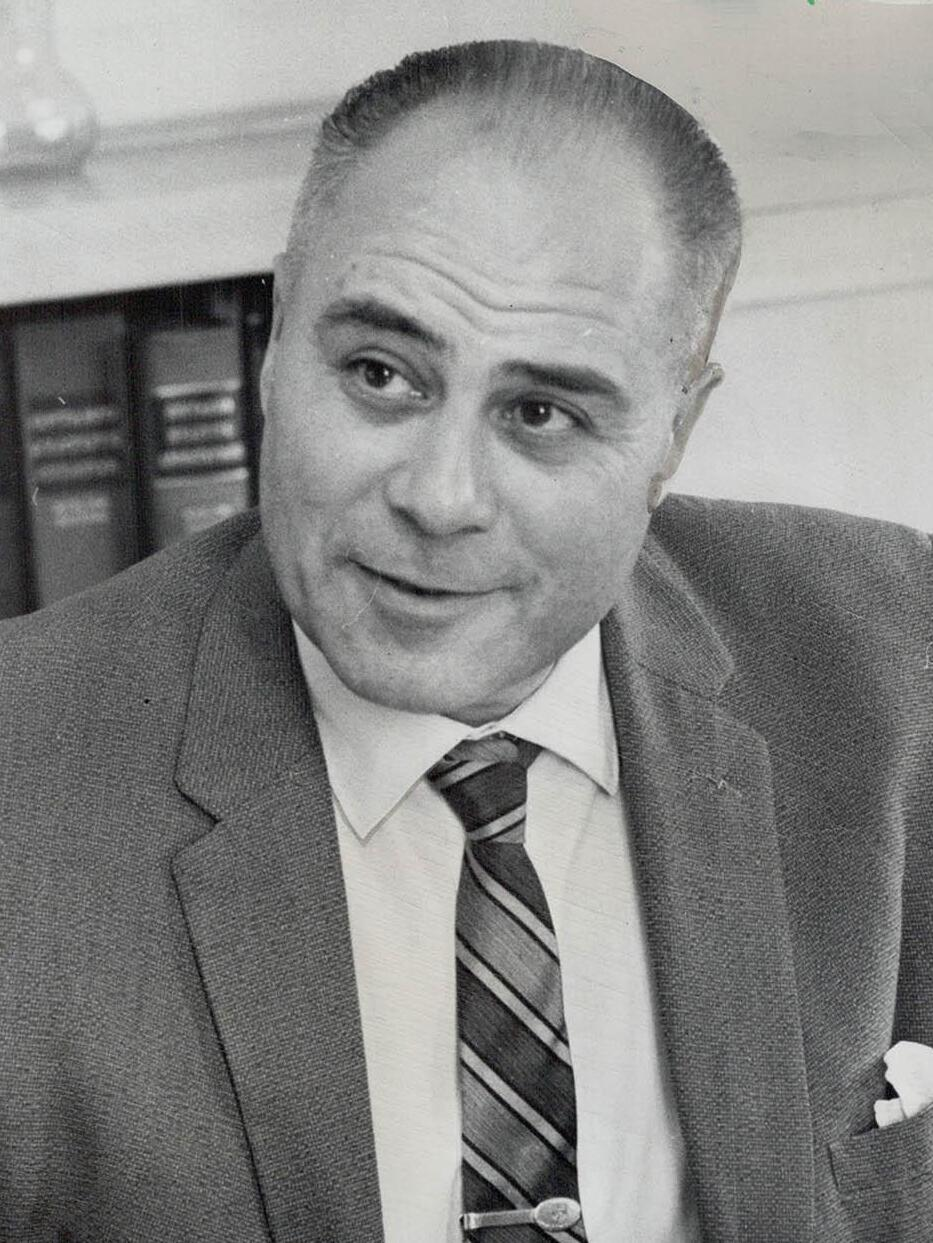
- Cass in 1962

Ontario MPP
- In office 1955–1971
- Preceded by: George Holmes Challies
- Succeeded by: Donald Irvine
- Constituency: Grenville—Dundas

Personal details
- Born: August 5, 1913 Chesterville, Ontario
- Died: November 25, 2000 (aged 87)
- Party: Progressive Conservative
- Spouse: Olive Casselman
- Relatives: John McIntosh (great-great grandfather); John Cook (great-great grandfather); William H. Casselman (father-in-law)
- Occupation: Lawyer

Military service
- Allegiance: Canada
- Branch/service: Canadian Army
- Years of service: 1941 - 1945; 1961 - 1983
- Rank: Major; Honorary Colonel
- Unit: Stormont, Dundas and Glengarry Highlanders
- Battles/wars: Second World War: Italian Campaign; North-West Europe Campaign

Frederick McIntosh Cass Q.C., C.D. ( August 5, 1913 – November 25, 2000) was a Canadian politician who served as both Attorney-General of Ontario and Speaker of the Legislative Assembly. He served as a Progressive Conservative Member of Provincial Parliament from 1955 until his retirement in 1971. Cass served in the Canadian Army during the Second World War from 1941 to 1945.

== Background ==
Born in Chesterville, Ontario, Cass was the older son of William Joseph Mavety Cass and Agnes Isabel (McIntosh) Cass, whose great-grandfathers were John McIntosh, of apple fame, and John Cook.

He was called to the Bar in Ontario in 1936 and joined his father, who had been called to the Bar in 1911, in the practice of law under the firm name, Cass & Cass. His wife, Olive, was herself the daughter of a former provincial politician, William H. Casselman, who represented Dundas as a United Farmers of Ontario member from 1919 to 1923.

== Politics ==
Cass represented the riding of Grenville—Dundas just south of Ottawa. He first won a seat in the 1955 provincial election. He was appointed to provincial cabinet in 1958 as Minister of Highways under Leslie Frost and became known as the cabinet's troubleshooter. In 1961, Frost retired and Cass was considered one of his potential successors. Instead, he supported provincial treasurer James Allan at the party's leadership convention. Allan was defeated by John Robarts, who appointed Cass Minister of Municipal Affairs, and later, Attorney General in 1962.

While he was Attorney-General, Cass continued to practise on the weekends as a small-town lawyer in his hometown of Chesterville and another office in nearby Winchester, where his mother lived. However, to avoid a conflict of interest, he stayed out of the courts and practised solely as a solicitor.

Cass provoked serious controversy when, in response to an organized crime scare, he proposed Bill 99, a sweeping amendment to the Police Act, which would have broadened police powers allowing the Ontario Police Commission the right to interrogate and cross-examine witnesses in camera in contravention of the traditions established by English Common Law. When queried on the amendments by the press, Cass said "Yes, these are drastic, draconian measures that in some ways are really unbelievable in a country that has an English common law system." The resultant uproar and, in particular, a speech by Liberal MPP Andy Thompson forced Cass to resign from Cabinet on March 23, 1964. Thompson's success buoyed him into the position of leader of the Liberal Party several months later.

The controversy led to the Robarts government appointing the McRuer Commission on Civil Rights that led to a number of reforms to enhance civil liberties in Ontario.

Following his re-election in the 1967 general election, Cass was rehabilitated by being chosen Speaker of the Legislative Assembly of Ontario once the body reconvened on February 14, 1968. He was a popular presiding officer and served until his retirement at the 1971 election. As Speaker, Cass ruled that Opposition MPPs could no longer begin their questions during Question Period with the word "why", as questions were "usually not aimed at soliciting information from cabinet ministers, but at giving the questioner an opening to catalogue his complaints about the government." This resulted in various verbal gymnastics as Opposition MPPs struggled to find a way to say "why" without saying "why.

=== Office held ===
Legislative Assembly of Ontario
Preceded by George Holmes Challies	MPP for Grenville—Dundas; 1955–1971	Succeeded by Donald Roy Irvine
Preceded by Donald Morrow	Speaker of the Legislative Assembly; 1968–1971	Succeeded by Allan Reuter
Frost ministry, Province of Ontario (1949–1961)
Preceded by James N. Allan	Minister of Highways; 1959–1961	Succeeded by Bill Goodfellow
Robarts ministry, Province of Ontario (1961–1971)
Preceded by Bill Warrender	Minister of Municipal Affairs; 1961–1962	Succeeded by Wilf Spooner
Preceded by Kelso Roberts	Attorney General; 1962–1964	Succeeded by Arthur Wishart
