= Orlando Bush =

Canadian politician

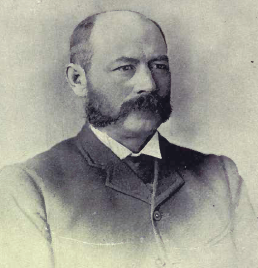

Ontario MPP
- In office 1890–1898
- Preceded by: Frederick John French
- Succeeded by: Robert L. Joynt
- Constituency: Grenville

Personal details
- Born: December 25, 1849 Oxford Township, Grenville County, Canada West
- Died: April 29, 1925 (aged 75) Edmonton, Alberta
- Party: Conservative
- Spouses: Ellen Mundle (m. 1882–1907) Henryetta Bower (m. 1908)
- Occupation: Businessman

Orlando Bush (December 25, 1849 – April 29, 1925) was a farmer, businessman and political figure in Ontario and Alberta. He represented Grenville in the Legislative Assembly of Ontario as a Conservative member from 1890 to 1898.

He was born in Oxford Township, Grenville County, Canada West in 1849, the son of Henry Bush (1807-1894) and his wife Maria Stanley and a grandson of a United Empire Loyalist, and was educated in the local schools. In 1882, he married Ellen Mundle. He was a member of the township council for Oxford, serving as township reeve from 1886 to 1889 and warden for Leeds and Grenville Counties in 1888.

Bush lived near Kemptville, where he sold produce and owned several cheese factories, until 1898 when he moved to Alberta. He farmed and ranched in Clover Bar district east of Strathcona. In 1903, he established a real estate, insurance and loan agency at Strathcona. Bush ran unsuccessfully for a seat in the House of Commons in 1904. He served on the Strathcona city council from 1908 to 1910 and was also a member of the local school board. In 1908, he married Henryetta Bower after the death of his first wife. Bush retired from farming in 1910 and from business in 1911. He served on Edmonton City Council in 1915 and 1917 after Strathcona amalgamated with Edmonton.

He was a member of the Freemasons, the Ancient Order of United Workmen and the Loyal Orange Lodge.
