= Mcneil Clarke =

Canadian politician

Ontario MPP
- In office 1867–1872
- Preceded by: Riding established
- Succeeded by: Christopher Finlay Fraser
- Constituency: Grenville South

Personal details
- Born: July 23, 1838 Derry, Ireland
- Died: February 29, 1872 (aged 33) Toronto, Ontario
- Party: Conservative
- Occupation: Lawyer

Mcneil Clarke (July 23, 1838 – February 29, 1872) was an Ontario lawyer and political figure. He represented Grenville South in the Legislative Assembly of Ontario from 1867 to 1872.

He was born in Derry, Ireland in 1838. He was called to the Upper Canada bar in 1866. Clarke served as mayor of Prescott from 1866 to 1867. He was elected to the provincial legislature in 1867 and died in 1872 during his second term in office.

== Electoral history ==
1867 Ontario general election: Grenville South
Party	Candidate	Votes	%
Conservative	Mcneil Clarke	849	53.46
Liberal	J. McCarthy	739	46.54
Total valid votes		1,588	80.90
Eligible voters		1,963	
Conservative pickup new district.			
Source: Elections Ontario

1871 Ontario general election: Grenville South
Party	Candidate	Votes	%	±%
Conservative	Mcneil Clarke	797	51.22	−2.24
Liberal	Christopher Fraser	759	48.78	+2.24
Turnout		1,556	76.42	−4.48
Eligible voters		2,036		
Conservative hold		Swing		−2.24
Source: Elections Ontario
