= Wilmot Howard Cole =

Ontario MPP
- In office 1875–1879
- Preceded by: William Fitzsimmons
- Succeeded by: Christopher Finlay Fraser
- Constituency: Brockville

Personal details
- Born: February 16, 1834 Brockville, Upper Canada
- Died: December 13, 1915 (aged 81) Brockville, Ontario
- Party: Liberal
- Spouse: Jane Adelaide Phillips
- Children: 4
- Occupation: Businessman

Military service
- Allegiance: Canadian
- Branch/service: Canadian Army
- Years of service: 1855-1886
- Rank: Lieutenant-Colonel
- Unit: The Brockville Rifles
- Battles/wars: Fenian Raids

Wilmot Howard Cole (February 16, 1834 – December 13, 1915) was a merchant and political figure in Ontario. He represented Brockville in the Legislative Assembly of Ontario from 1875 to 1879 as a Liberal member.

He was born in Brockville, the son of Abel Cole and Catherine Seaman, and was educated there. He established himself in business in 1855 as a merchant. He served in the local militia, reaching the rank of colonel, and served during the Fenian raids. Cole was a member of the town council and a prominent member of the local Oddfellows lodge, also serving as grand master. He helped found a company that established waterworks at Brockville. Cole married Jane Adelaide Phillips. In 1882, he was named registrar for Leeds County. Cole was one of the promoters of the Brockville, Westport and Sault Ste. Marie Railway. He died in 1915.

== Electoral history ==
1875 Ontario general election: Brockville
Party	Candidate	Votes	%	±%
Liberal	Wilmot Howard Cole	1,247	51.51	+1.79
Conservative	William Fitzsimmons	1,174	48.49	−1.79
Turnout		2,421	71.35	+5.03
Eligible voters		3,393		
Liberal notional gain from Conservative		Swing		+1.79
Source: Elections Ontario
