= Frederick John French =

Canadian politician

Ontario MPP
- In office 1879–1890
- Preceded by: Christopher Finlay Fraser
- Succeeded by: Orlando Bush
- Constituency: Grenville South, 1879-1886; Grenville, 1886-1890

Personal details
- Born: January 14, 1847 Burritt's Rapids, Canada West
- Died: September 25, 1924 (aged 77)
- Party: Conservative
- Spouse: Alma Alicia Gordon (m. 1879)
- Occupation: Lawyer

Frederick John French, KC (January 14, 1847 – September 25, 1924) was an Ontario lawyer and political figure. He represented Grenville South and then Grenville in the Legislative Assembly of Ontario as a Conservative member from 1879 to 1890.

He was born in Burritt's Rapids, Canada West in 1847, the son of John Strachan French, of United Empire Loyalist heritage. His great grandfather Jeremiah French served in the first parliament of Upper Canada. French studied law in Ottawa and Toronto, was called to the bar in 1870 and set up practice in Prescott, also working in Ottawa. In 1879, he married Alma Alicia Gordon, the sister of William Gordon who was mayor of Stratford. French was named Queen's Counsel in 1889.

== Electoral history ==
1879 Ontario general election: Grenville South
Party	Candidate	Votes	%	±%
Conservative	Frederick John French	1,205	53.01	+6.37
Liberal	Christopher Finlay Fraser	1,068	46.99	−6.37
Total valid votes		2,273	70.20	−0.84
Eligible voters		3,238		
Conservative gain from Liberal		Swing		+6.37
Source: Elections Ontario
