= Hezekiah Allan Clark =

Canadian politician

Ontario MPP
- In office 1923–1934
- Preceded by: Donald McAlpine
- Succeeded by: Riding abolished
- Constituency: Brockville

Personal details
- Born: September 7, 1875 Reids Mills, Ontario
- Died: March 19, 1939 (aged 63) Brockville, Ontario
- Party: Conservative
- Spouse: Geraldine Cornell (m. 1913)
- Occupation: Dentist

Hezekiah Allan Clark (September 7, 1875 – March 19, 1939) was a dentist and political figure in Ontario. He represented Brockville in the Legislative Assembly of Ontario from 1923 to 1934 as a Conservative member.

The son of Joseph Clark and Mary Jane Allan, he was born in Reids Mills, Ontario and educated in Kemptville. In 1913, Clark married Geraldine Cornell. He was a member of the Brockville Public Utilities Comssision and also served on the town council. After his sudden death in Brockville in 1939, he was buried at Oakland Cemetery in that same city.
