= Dr. Morse's Indian Root Pills =

Quack medical product

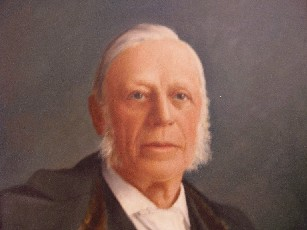
William H. Comstock, circa 1905

Dr. Morse's Indian Root Pills was one of the most successful and enduring products to be manufactured and marketed in North America as part of the lucrative patent medicine industry, which thrived during most of the 19th and 20th centuries. Its manufacturer claimed the pills contained herbal ingredients that would help "cleanse the blood", as "impurity of the blood" was believed to be the cause of all disease.

== History ==
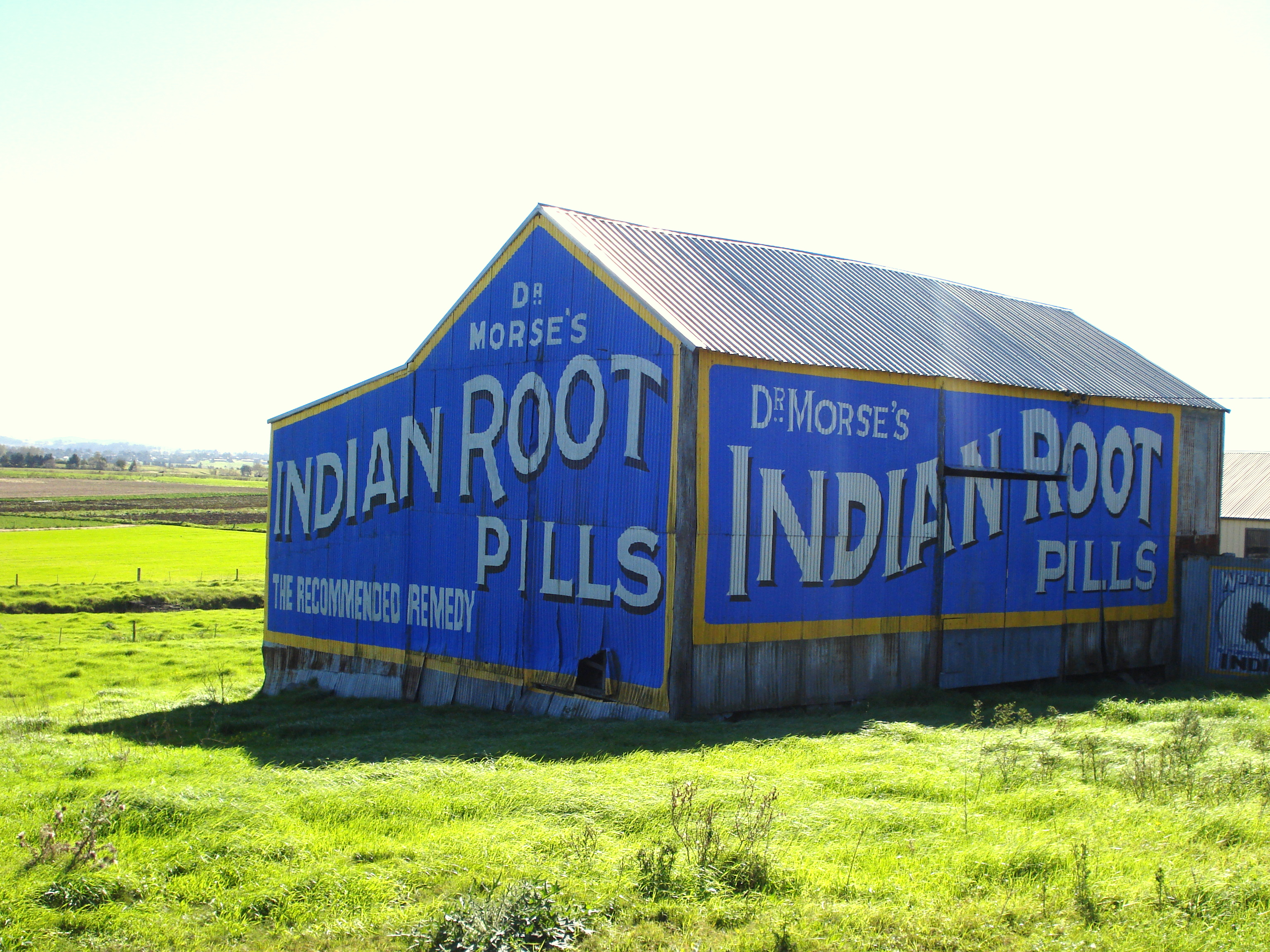
Advertisement for Dr Morse's Indian Root Pills in East Maitland, New South Wales, Australia

Dr. Morse's Indian Root Pills have their genesis with the father of William Henry Comstock, Edwin Perkins Comstock (1799–1837) who founded a drug company in New York City sometime before 1833. The Comstock patent medicine business was involved in the sale of a number of successful drugs, including Carlton's Pile Liniment, Oldridge's Balm of Columbia, Kline's Tooth Ache Drops and Judson's Worm Tea. Between 1833 and the time of the acquisition of the rights to Dr. Morse's Indian Root Pills, the company remained under the control of the Comstocks through the additional involvement of Edwin's four brothers:

1. Lucius Samuel Comstock, (1806–1876)
2. Albert Lee Comstock (1802–1876)
3. John Carlton Comstock (1819–1853)
4. George Wells Comstock (1820–1889)

The Indian Root Pills were first formulated and manufactured in 1854 by Andrew B. Moore (born around 1821, New York), who was then operating under the name A.B. Moore in Buffalo, New York. Rights to the pills were then transferred through a number of different business partnerships under the control of Moore involving:

1. Andrew Judson White, MD (1824–1898) – paternal uncle of publisher and poet James Terry White (1845–1920)
2. Baldwin Lake Judson (1832–1867), son of Edwin's sister
3. George Wells Comstock
4. William Henry Comstock

These reorganizations all occurred amid numerous disputes and lawsuits. During that long period of instability, the manufacturing operations moved from Buffalo to New York City and then to dual sites on opposite sides of the St. Lawrence River, one at Brockville, Ontario, and the other at Morristown, New York. Ownership of Dr. Morse's Indian Root Pills finally stabilized in 1867 when it settled solely in the hands of William Henry Comstock, and thereafter business was carried out under the name W.H. Comstock Co. Ltd.

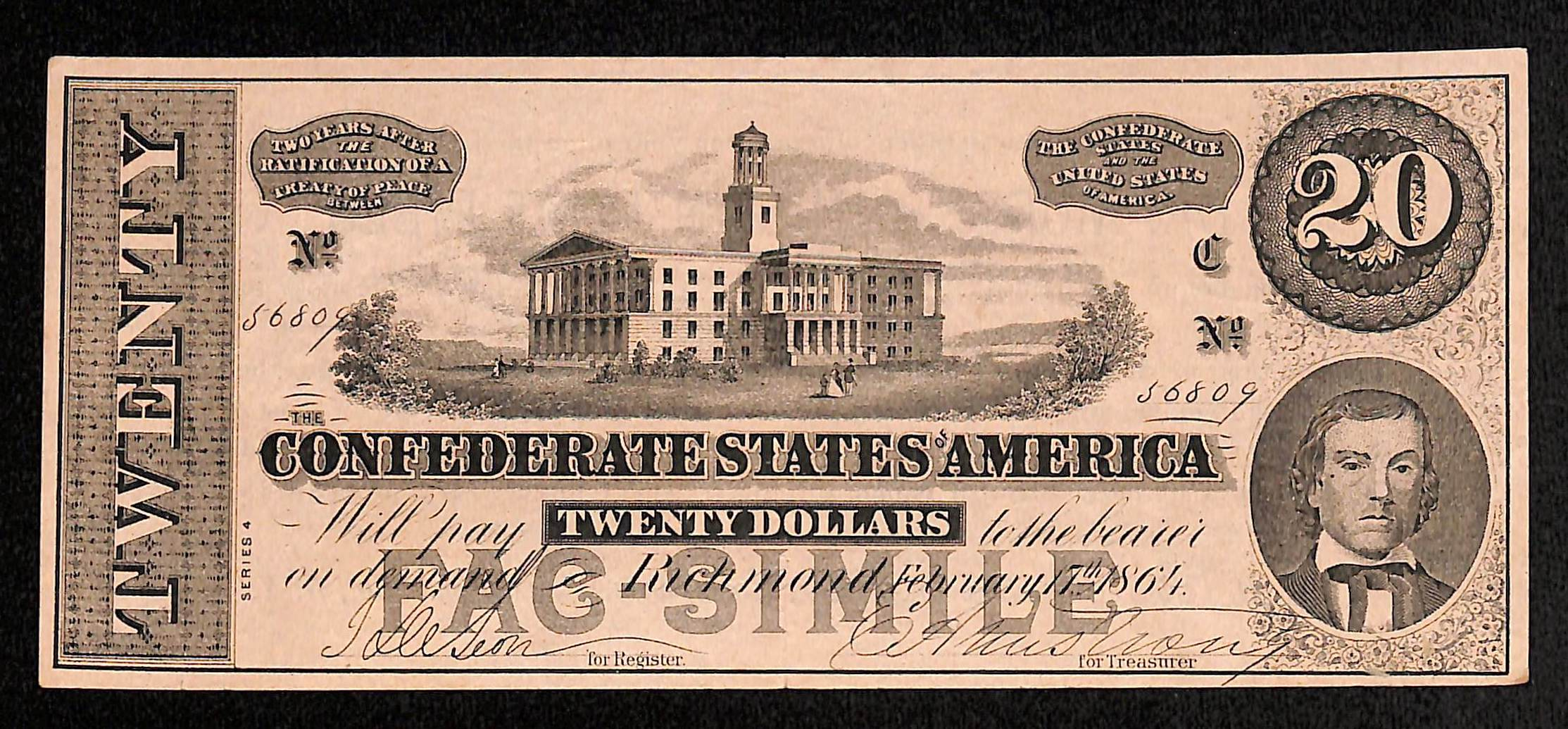
The front of a 19th or early 20th century facsimile of a $20 Confederate note used for marketing Dr. Morse's Indian Root Pills

When William Henry Comstock died in 1919, control of the company passed to his son, William Henry Comstock II (1897–1959), known as "Young Bill". A year after William Henry Comstock II died, his widow liquidated the company, selling the assets and patents to Milburn Medicine Company.

The subsidiary in Australia—W.H. Comstock Company Pty Ltd—had been headed by the former branch manager for the Comstocks. He acquired the rights for Australia and the Orient following the dissolution of the Canadian firm. The Australian firm distributed in New Zealand, Singapore, and Hong Kong up until 1992. Packaging and directions are now modern, the pills being described as "The Overnight Laxative with the Tonic Action", but a reproduction of the old label and the facsimile signature of William Henry Comstock, Sr. were still portrayed.

The W.H. Comstock Co (Aust) Pty Ltd had registered in New South Wales as an Australian Proprietary Company, by Limited Shares, on July 31, 1971, but deregistered on February 27, 1992.

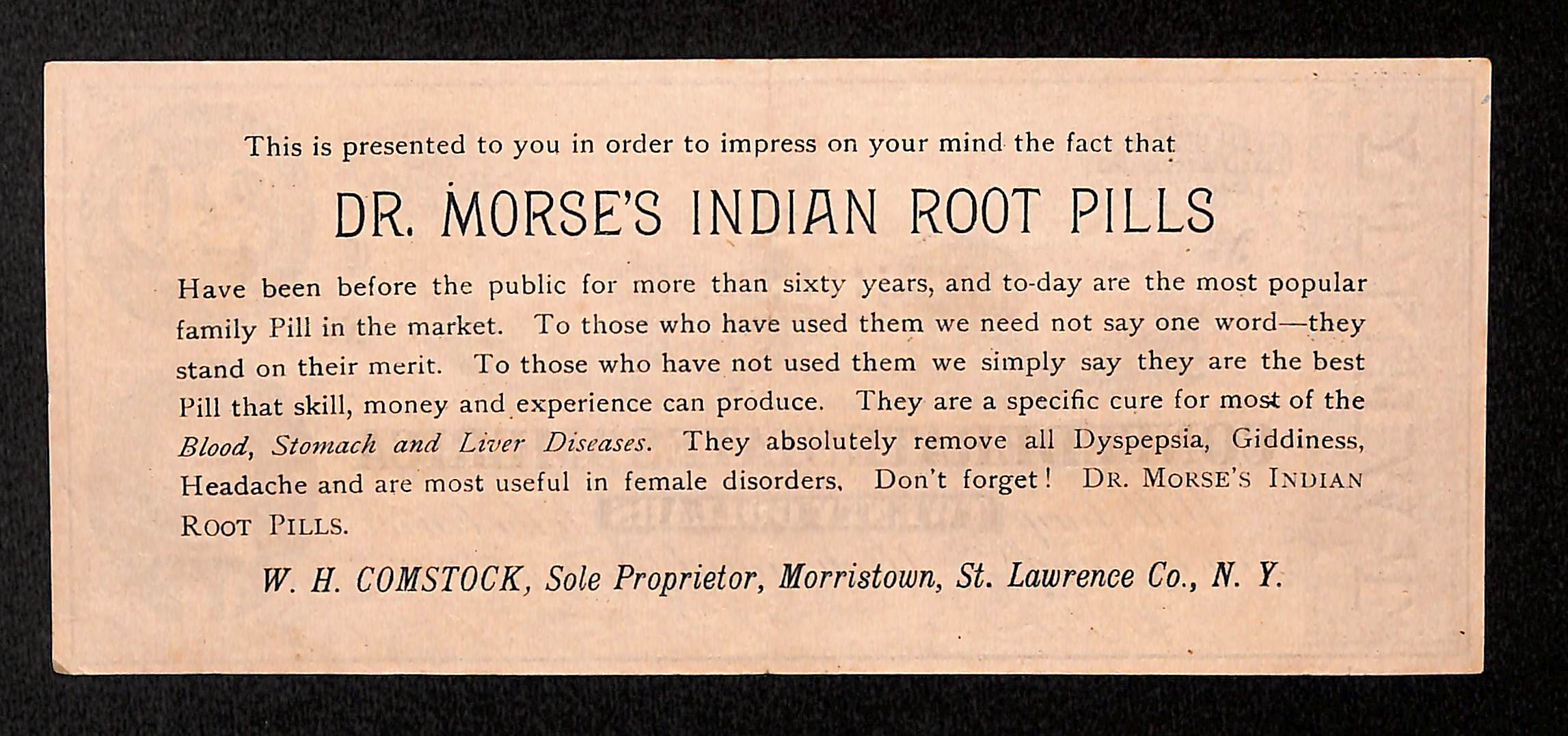
The reverse of the fake note where the marketing took place, naming W. H. Comstock as the "Sole Proprietor" at the time

== Succession of manufacturers in the 1800s ==
1. A.B. Moore & Co.
  225 Main Street
  Buffalo, New York
  Andrew B. Moore, proprietor
  An 1854 Buffalo directory list A.B. Moore & Co. as being the successor to (i) C.C. Bristol & (ii) Moore, Liebetrut & Co. and lists Andrew Judson White as a clerk at A.B. Moore & Co.
2. Comstock & Co. (1837–1841)
  Lucius Samuel Comstock, MD, partner
  Albert Lee Comstock, partner
  John Carlton Comstock, employee
  George Wells Comstock, employee
3. Comstock & Co. (11 January 1841 – 1846)
  Lucius Samuel Comstock, partner
  21 Courtland Street
  Ann Moore (Lucius's mother-in-law), partner
4. Comstock & Co. (born 1841)
  57 John Street (1841–1853)
  45 Vesey Street (1853–1876), in the rear of the courtyard of St. Paul's Chapel
  New York, New York
  Lucius Samuel Comstock, MD, partner
  John Carlton Comstock, partner
  George Wells Comstock, employee
  William Henry Comstock (nephew), employee (son of Edwin)
  Note: Lucius continued to operate this firm after John & George left in 1849 over a dispute with Lucius. Lucius exited the patent medicine business and resumed his legal career, continuing until his death in 1876.
5. Comstock & Co. Brothers (March 1849 – 1 August 1850)
  Lucius Comstock, MD, partner
  John Carlton Comstock, partner
  George Wells Comstock, partner
6. Comstock & Brother (1 August 1850 – 17 September 1853)
  9 John Street
  New York, New York
  John Carlton Comstock, partner
  George Wells Comstock, partner
  William Henry Comstock (nephew), clerk (son of Edwin)
  Note: This partnership was terminated at the death of John Carlton Comstock
7. Comstock & Brother (1 October 1853 – 1864)
  9 John Street (1 October 1853 – 1855)
  50 Leonard Street (1855–1864)
  New York, New York
  George Wells Comstock, partner (1/2)
  William Henry Comstock, partner (1/4)
  Baldwin Lake Judson, partner (1/4)
  Note: George retained exclusive possession to all trademarks, recipes, and rights to medicines
  Successor firm in 1864 was Comstock & Judson
8. A.J. White & Co. (10 August 1855 – )
  50 Leonard Street
  New York, New York
  August 10, 1855, Andrew Judson White, who had a 50% partnership with Andrew B. Moore to distribute Dr. Morse's Indian Root Pills, entered into a contract (as individual) with Comstock & Brother to manufacturer and distribute the pills—White was to receive 1/4th of the profits and the firm 3/4ths. It is not clear why Moore was not included in the partnership. The Comstocks retained control of the firm bearing White's name. White claimed absolute ownership of the pills. Moore, who strongly disagreed, continued to produce the pills and published literature denouncing production by A.J. White & Co. as forgeries. Moore, however, accepted employment (not partnership) by A.J. White & Co. June 21, 1858, and agreed to cease producing the pills. But on January 1, 1859, White and Moore took books, account records and various assets from the firm's office and formed a business under the same name, A.J. White & Co., at 10 Courtlandt Street.
9. A.J. White & Co. (1 January 1859 – 1914)
  10 Courtlandt Street
  New York, New York
  Andrew B. Moore, partner
  Andrew Judson White, partner
10. B. Lake Judson (born 1859)
  106 Franklin Street
  George Wells Comstock, partner (1/2)
  William Henry Comstock, partner (1/4)
  Baldwin Lake Judson, partner (1/4)
  B. Lake Judson was formed to escape of having to compete selling the pills with the rebel company headed by the person bearing the manufacturer's name that Comstock had promoted for three years.
11. Comstock & Brothers
  106 Franklin Street
  Baldwin Lake Judson, partner
12. Comstock & Judson (born 1864)
  50 Leonard Street
  New York, New York
  George Wells Comstock, partner (1/2)
  William Henry Comstock, partner (1/4)
  Baldwin Lake Judson, partner (1/4)
  Note: George still retained exclusive possession to all trademarks, recipes, and rights to medicines
  This firm succeeded Comstock & Brother
13. W.H. Comstock Co., Ltd. (1867–1960)
  Morristown, New York & Brockville, Ontario
  In April 1867, the processing of Morse's Indian Root Pills moved from New York City to Morristown, New York, on the Saint Lawrence River in northern New York, on the Canada–US border. This was not the firm's first move to the area. Three or four years earlier, William Henry Comstock had taken over an existing business in Brockville, Ontario, directly across the river from Morristown. The Indian Root Pill plant remained in Morristown for the next ninety years.

Manufacturing & distribution in Australia

1. W.H. Comstock Company Pty. Ltd.
  23 Lang Street
  58 Pitt Street
  Sydney, Australia
2. W.H. Comstock Company Pty. Ltd.
  Farish Street
  Wellington, New Zealand

Dr. Morse's Indian Root Pills and Comstock's Worm Tablets are still manufactured and sold by the W.H. Comstock Company Pty. Ltd., in Australia. The company was once a subsidiary of the Brockville, Canada. It is headed by the former branch manager for the Comstocks, who acquired the rights for Australia and the Orient following the dissolution of the Canadian firm.

The Australian firm distributes in New Zealand, Singapore, and Hong Kong. Packaging and directions are now modern, the pills being described as "The Overnight Laxative with the Tonic Action", but a reproduction of the old label and the facsimile signature of William Henry Comstock, Sr., are still being portrayed. Thus, the Indian Root Pills have been manufactured continuously for at least 115 years and the Comstock business, through the original and successor firms, has survived for nearly 140 years.

The W.H. Comstock Co (Aust) Pty Ltd. had registered in New South Wales as an Australian Proprietary Company, by Limited Shares, on July 31, 1971, but deregistered on February 27, 1992.

== Ingredients ==
The rules, of the Federal Food and Drug Act, forced disclosure of the ingredients, during the 1930s, and these included aloe, mandrake, gamboge, jalap and cayenne pepper.
