= Brockville (federal electoral district) =

Former federal electoral district in Ontario, Canada

Ontario electoral district

Defunct federal electoral district
- Legislature: House of Commons
- District created: 1867
- District abolished: 1914
- First contested: 1867
- Last contested: 1911

Brockville was a federal electoral district in Ontario, Canada, that was represented in the House of Commons of Canada from 1867 to 1917. It was created by the British North America Act 1867.

It consisted initially of the Town of Brockville and the Township of Elizabethtown. In 1882, the township of Kitley was added to the riding. In 1903, the township of Kitley was removed from the riding, and the townships of Yonge and Escott (Front and Rear), and the village of Athens were added.

The electoral district was abolished in 1914 when it was merged into Leeds ridings.

== Members of Parliament ==
This riding has elected the following members of Parliament:

Parliament	Years	Member	Party
1st	1867–1872	James Crawford	Conservative
2nd	1872–1874	Jacob Dockstader Buell	Liberal
3rd	1874–1878	Jacob Dockstader Buell	Liberal
4th	1878–1882	William Fitzsimmons	Conservative
5th	1882–1887	John Fisher Wood	Liberal–Conservative
6th	1887–1891	John Fisher Wood	Liberal–Conservative
7th	1891–1892	John Fisher Wood	Liberal–Conservative
7th	1892–1896	John Fisher Wood	Liberal–Conservative
8th	1896–1899	John Fisher Wood	Liberal–Conservative
8th	1899–1900	William Henry Comstock	Liberal
9th	1900–1904	John Culbert	Conservative
10th	1904–1907	Daniel Derbyshire	Liberal
10th	1907–1908	George Perry Graham	Liberal
11th	1908–1911	George Perry Graham	Liberal
12th	1911–1917	John Webster	Conservative
Riding dissolved into Leeds

== Election results ==
1867 Canadian federal election
Party	Candidate	Votes
Conservative	James Crawford	690
Unknown	F. W. H. Chambers	521
Eligible voters		1,641
Source: Canadian Parliamentary Guide, 18711867 Return of the Elections to House of Commons

Result by subdivision

Subdivision	Chambers	Crawford	Total vote	Eligible voters
Brockville East Ward	57	112	169	230
Brockville Centre Ward	88	97	185	289
Brockville West Ward	58	103	161	221
Elizabethtown Township	320	376	696	901
Total	521	690	1,211	1,641

1872 Canadian federal election
Party	Candidate	Votes
Liberal	Jacob Dockstader Buell	804
Unknown	H. Abbott	793
Source: Canadian Elections Database

1874 Canadian federal election
Party	Candidate	Votes
Liberal	Jacob Dockstader Buell	910
Conservative	J. Crawford	868
Source: open.canada.ca

1878 Canadian federal election
Party	Candidate	Votes
Conservative	William Fitzsimmons	1,033
Liberal	Jacob Dockstader Buell	906
Source: Canadian Elections Database

1882 Canadian federal election
Party	Candidate	Votes
Liberal–Conservative	John Fisher Wood	1,277
Liberal	William Henry Comstock	1,272

1887 Canadian federal election
Party	Candidate	Votes
Liberal–Conservative	John Fisher Wood	1,823
Liberal	William Henry Comstock	1,534

1891 Canadian federal election
Party	Candidate	Votes
Liberal–Conservative	John Fisher Wood	1,815
Liberal	Daniel Derbyshire	1,637

On Mr. Wood's nomination as Controller of Inland Revenue, 5 December 1892:

By-election on 21 December 1892
Party	Candidate	Votes
Liberal–Conservative	John Fisher Wood	acclaimed

1896 Canadian federal election
Party	Candidate	Votes
Liberal–Conservative	Hon. John Fisher Wood	1,781
Liberal	James Cumming	1,549
McCarthyite	William Johnson Cluff	148

On Mr. Wood's death, 14 March 1899:

By-election on 20 April 1899
Party	Candidate	Votes
Liberal	W. H. Comstock	1,881
Conservative	Hon. Peter White	1,673

1900 Canadian federal election
Party	Candidate	Votes
Conservative	John Culbert	1,886
Liberal	D. Derbyshire	1,665

1904 Canadian federal election
Party	Candidate	Votes
Liberal	D. Derbyshire	2,217
Conservative	John Culbert	2,013

On Mr. Derbyshire's resignation, 30 August 1907:

By-election on 18 September 1907
Party	Candidate	Votes
Liberal	Hon. G. P. Graham	acclaimed

1908 Canadian federal election
Party	Candidate	Votes
Liberal	Hon. G. P. Graham	2,144
Conservative	John Webster	2,000

1911 Canadian federal election
Party	Candidate	Votes
Conservative	John Webster	2,251
Liberal	Hon. G. P. Graham	2,140

== See also ==
- List of Canadian electoral districts
- Historical federal electoral districts of Canada
