= Robert L. Joynt =

Canadian politician

Ontario MPP
- In office 1898–1904
- Preceded by: Orlando Bush
- Succeeded by: Howard Ferguson
- Constituency: Grenville

Personal details
- Born: May 22, 1845 New Boyne, Leeds County, Canada West
- Died: November 4, 1931 (aged 86) Elizabethtown, Ontario
- Party: Conservative
- Spouse: Margaret Donovan (m. 1874)
- Occupation: Merchant

Robert L. Joynt (May 22, 1845 – November 4, 1931) was an Ontario merchant and political figure. He represented Grenville in the Legislative Assembly of Ontario from 1898 to 1904 as a Conservative member.

He was born in New Boyne, Leeds County, Canada West, to Irish immigrants. Joynt was the reeve for Augusta Township from 1891 to 1895 and warden for the United Counties of Leeds and Grenville in 1895. He married Margaret Donovan in 1874. He died in 1931.
