= Daniel Derbyshire =

Canadian politician

The Hon. Daniel Derbyshire
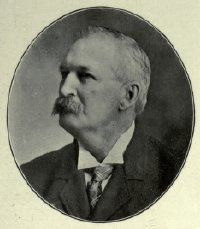

Canadian Senator from Ontario
- In office November 22, 1907 – June 18, 1916
- Appointed by: Wilfrid Laurier

Member of Parliament for Brockville
- In office 1904–1907
- Preceded by: John Culbert
- Succeeded by: George Perry Graham

Personal details
- Born: December 11, 1846 Plum Hollow, Leeds County, Canada West
- Died: June 18, 1916 (aged 69)
- Party: Liberal

Daniel Derbyshire (December 11, 1846 – June 18, 1916) was a Canadian politician.

== Background ==
Born in Plum Hollow, Leeds County, Canada West, the son of Harvey and Mary Derbyshire, Derbyshire was educated in Public Schools of the district and in the Athens High School. He received a first class normal certificate, after which he taught school for a few years. He later entered the dairy business and opened a Plum Hollow factory and another one in Athens. In 1881 he moved to Brockville, Ontario having accepted a position as representative of A. A. Ayer & Co. of Montreal. He later entered into the handling of butter and factory supplies. He was elected a member of the Brockville Council and was Mayor of Brockville in 1886 and 1889.

He was first elected to the House of Commons of Canada for the riding of Brockville in the general elections of 1904. In 1907, he was summoned to the Senate of Canada representing the senatorial division of Brockville, Ontario on the advice of Wilfrid Laurier. A Liberal, he served until his death in 1916.

== Electoral history ==
1891 Canadian federal election: Brockville
Party	Candidate	Votes
Liberal–Conservative	John Fisher Wood	1,815
Liberal	Daniel Derbyshire	1,637

1900 Canadian federal election: Brockville
Party	Candidate	Votes
Conservative	John Culbert	1,886
Liberal	D. Derbyshire	1,665

1904 Canadian federal election: Brockville
Party	Candidate	Votes
Liberal	D. Derbyshire	2,217
Conservative	John Culbert	2,013
