= William Fitzsimmons (Canadian politician) =

Mayor of Brockville, Ontario (1819–1894)

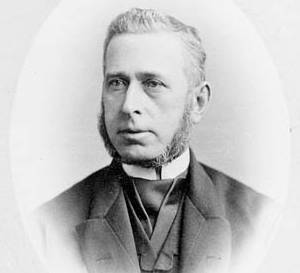

Member of Parliament for Brockville
- In office 1878–1882
- Preceded by: Jacob Dockstader Buell
- Succeeded by: John Fisher Wood

Ontario MPP
- In office 1867–1875
- Preceded by: Riding established
- Succeeded by: Wilmot Howard Cole
- Constituency: Brockville and Elizabethtown

Personal details
- Born: March 4, 1819 County Donegal, Ireland
- Died: July 15, 1894 (aged 75)
- Party: Conservative
- Occupation: Building contractor

William Fitzsimmons (March 4, 1819 – July 1894) was a building contractor and political figure in Ontario, Canada. He represented Brockville and Elizabethtown in the Legislative Assembly of Ontario from 1867 to 1874 and Brockville in the House of Commons of Canada as a Conservative member from 1879 to 1882.

He was born in County Donegal, Ireland in 1819 and came to Perth, Ontario in Upper Canada with his parents in 1823. After completing his schooling, he worked with a building contractor in Perth before settling in Brockville in 1841. He served on the town council, also serving 8 years as mayor, and supervised the building of Victoria Hall. He served in the local militia.

== Electoral history ==
=== Federal ===
1878 Canadian federal election: Brockville
Party	Candidate	Votes
Conservative	William Fitzsimmons	1,033
Liberal	Jacob Dockstader Buell	906
Source: Canadian Elections Database

=== Provincial ===
1867 Ontario general election: Brockville and Elizabethtown
Party	Candidate	Votes	%
Conservative	William Fitzsimmons	630	51.05
Liberal	Christopher Finlay Fraser	604	48.95
Total valid votes		1,234	75.38
Eligible voters		1,637	
Conservative pickup new district.			
Source: Elections Ontario

1871 Ontario general election: Brockville and Elizabethtown
Party	Candidate	Votes	%	±%
Conservative	William Fitzsimmons	620	50.28	−0.77
Liberal	Jacob Dockstader Buell	613	49.72	+0.77
Turnout		1,233	66.33	−9.05
Eligible voters		1,859		
Conservative hold		Swing		−0.77
Source: Elections Ontario

1875 Ontario general election: Brockville
Party	Candidate	Votes	%	±%
Liberal	Wilmot Howard Cole	1,247	51.51	+1.79
Conservative	William Fitzsimmons	1,174	48.49	−1.79
Turnout		2,421	71.35	+5.03
Eligible voters		3,393		
Liberal notional gain from Conservative		Swing		+1.79
Source: Elections Ontario
