= The National Cyclopaedia of American Biography =

Multi-volume collection of biographical articles

The National Cyclopaedia of American Biography is a multi-volume collection of biographical articles and portraits of Americans, published since the 1890s. The primary method of data collection was by sending questionnaires to subjects or their relatives. It has over 60,000 entries, in 63 volumes. The entries are not credited. The overall editor was James Terry White. It is more comprehensive than the Dictionary of American Biography and the American National Biography, but less scholarly because it does not cite the original sources used for the information.

== See also ==
- Appletons' Cyclopædia of American Biography
