= George Augustus Dana =

Canadian politician

Ontario MPP
- In office 1894–1898
- Preceded by: Christopher Finlay Fraser
- Succeeded by: George Perry Graham
- Constituency: Brockville

Personal details
- Born: 1840 Brockville, Upper Canada
- Died: 1911 (aged 70–71)
- Party: Liberal
- Occupation: Contractor

George Augustus Dana (1840–1911) was an Ontario contractor and political figure. He represented Brockville in the Legislative Assembly of Ontario from 1894 to 1898 as a Liberal member.

He was born in Brockville, Upper Canada, the son of Alonzo B. Dana who served three terms as mayor of Brockville. Dana served on the town council, as a water commissioner and also was mayor from 1885 to 1886. He served in the local militia and was a director of the Canadian Central Railway. Dana also wrote a number of plays.
