= George Crawford (Canadian politician) =

Canadian politician

George Crawford (1793 – July 4, 1870) was a founding member of the Senate of Canada. A Conservative, he was appointed to the Senate on 23 October 1867 by Royal Proclamation, and served in that capacity until his death.

He was born in County Leitrim in Ireland in 1793 and came to Upper Canada in the 1820s. After moving to York, (later Toronto), he became a contractor in construction and worked on the Rideau, Cornwall and Beauharnois canals. He served as lieutenant-colonel in the Leeds militia. He was also president of the Brockville and Ottawa Railway.

Around 1844, he moved to Brockville. He was elected to the Legislative Assembly of the Province of Canada representing Brockville in 1851 and 1854. In 1858, he was elected to the Legislative Council, the upper house at that time, and served until 1867, when he became a member of the Senate of Canada.

One son, John Willoughby, was elected to the House of Commons of Canada and served as Lieutenant Governor of Ontario. His son James represented Brockville in the House of Commons.
