= James Alfred Sanderson =

Canadian politician from Ontario

Member of the Ontario Provincial Parliament for Grenville
- In office February 11, 1931 – April 3, 1934
- Preceded by: Howard Ferguson
- Succeeded by: George Holmes Challies

Personal details
- Party: Conservative

James Alfred Sanderson was a Canadian politician from the Conservative Party of Ontario. He represented Grenville in the Legislative Assembly of Ontario from 1931 to 1934.

== See also ==
- 18th Parliament of Ontario
