= Albert Edward Donovan =

Canadian politician

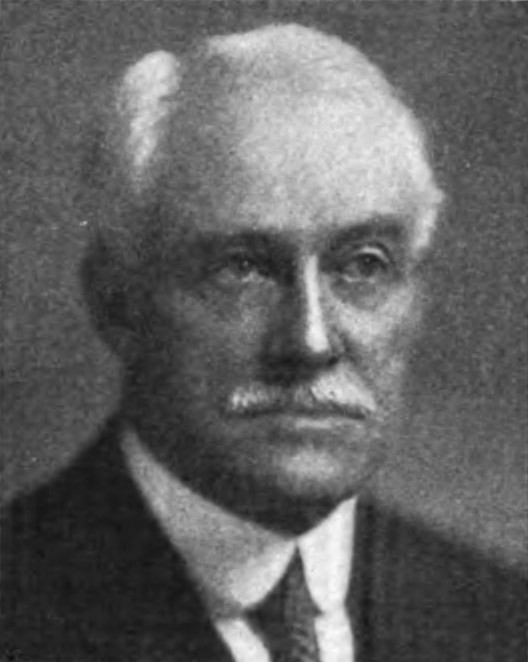

Ontario MPP
- In office 1907–1919
- Preceded by: George Perry Graham
- Succeeded by: Donald McAlpine
- Constituency: Brockville

Personal details
- Born: February 5, 1859 Portland Township, Leeds Country, Canada West
- Died: December 5, 1925 (aged 66) Toronto, Ontario, Canada
- Party: Conservative
- Spouse: Ella B. Fisher
- Occupation: Businessman

Albert Edward Donovan (February 5, 1859 – December 6, 1925) was an Ontario businessman and political figure. He represented Brockville in the Legislative Assembly of Ontario as a Conservative member from 1907 to 1919.

He was born in Portland Township, Leeds County, Ontario, the son of John Donovan. He was educated in Athens and taught school for several years. Donovan then entered the life insurance business, becoming an agent for the Sun Life Assurance Company of Canada in Great Britain and, after his return to Canada, represented the Mutual Life Insurance Company of New York in Halifax and then Toronto. He ran unsuccessfully against George Perry Graham for the provincial seat in 1905 and then was elected in a 1907 by-election after Graham entered federal politics. Dovovan married Ella B. Fisher.
