= Donald Roy Irvine =

Canadian politician

Donald Irvine

Ontario MPP
- In office 1971–1977
- Preceded by: Fred Cass
- Succeeded by: Norm Sterling
- Constituency: Grenville—Dundas 1971-1975; Carleton—Grenville, (1975-1977)

Personal details
- Born: January 20, 1920
- Died: October 1, 1994 (aged 74); Prescott, Ontario
- Political party: Progressive Conservative
- Spouse: Eleanor
- Children: 2
- Occupation: Businessman

Donald Roy Irvine (January 20, 1920 – October 1, 1994) was a Canadian politician, who served in the Legislative Assembly of Ontario from 1971 to 1977 as a Progressive Conservative member. He was a cabinet member for Premier Bill Davis.

== Background ==
Irvine was born on a farm in eastern Ontario, the youngest of seven children. He worked on the farm during his youth, and after high school he served in the Royal Canadian Air Force during World War II. After the war, he and his brother-in-law started a grocery store which eventually turned into a chain of six grocery stores. He sold those grocery stores to the large food chain of Loeb, being able to retire in a very financially sound position at 36. He was married (Eleanor) and had one son (Paul) and one daughter (Jane).

== Politics ==
Irvine served on the town council of Prescott, including three terms as mayor. Of his service, the Ottawa Citizen, on the eve of the provincial election in 1971, said, "Most townspeople consider Mr Irvine's three terms as one of the best things that ever happened to them."

Irvine was elected to the Legislative Assembly of Ontario in the 1971 provincial election in the riding of Grenville—Dundas replacing the retiring Fred Cass. Irvine became parliamentary assistant to Treasurer John White in 1972. In February 1974 he was appointed as Minister without portfolio responsible for Municipal Affairs. In October 1974 he was appointed as Minister of Housing replacing Sid Handleman who had suffered a heart attack. In 1975 he was shuffled to the Provincial Secretary for Resource Development. He continued to serve in cabinet until his retirement in 1977.

=== Cabinet posts ===
Ontario provincial government of Bill Davis
Cabinet posts (3)
Predecessor	Office	Successor
Allan Grossman	Provincial Secretary for Resource Development; 1975–1977	René Brunelle
Sid Handleman	Minister of Housing; 1974–1975	John Rhodes
Sub-Cabinet Post
Predecessor	Title	Successor
	Minister Without Portfolio (1974 February–October); Responsible for Municipal Affairs	
