= John Webster (Canadian politician) =

Canadian politician

John Webster (August 3, 1856 – December 1, 1928) was a merchant and political figure in Prince Edward County, Ontario, Canada. After being defeated in his first run for the position in 1908, Webster was elected to represent Brockville in the House of Commons of Canada from 1911 to 1917 as a Conservative. Webster's riding was abolished prior 1917 federal election and Webster did not run in the merged riding of Leeds held by fellow Tory Sir William Thomas White. Webster was appointed to the Senate of Canada by Sir Robert Borden and sat for Brockville division from 1918 until his death in 1928.

He was born in Bellamy, Canada West, the son of William J. Webster and Eliza Baker. Webster was a produce dealer in Brockville. In 1883, he married Esmeralda Davis. Webster died in office in Brockville at the age of 72.
