= George Holmes Challies =

Canadian politician

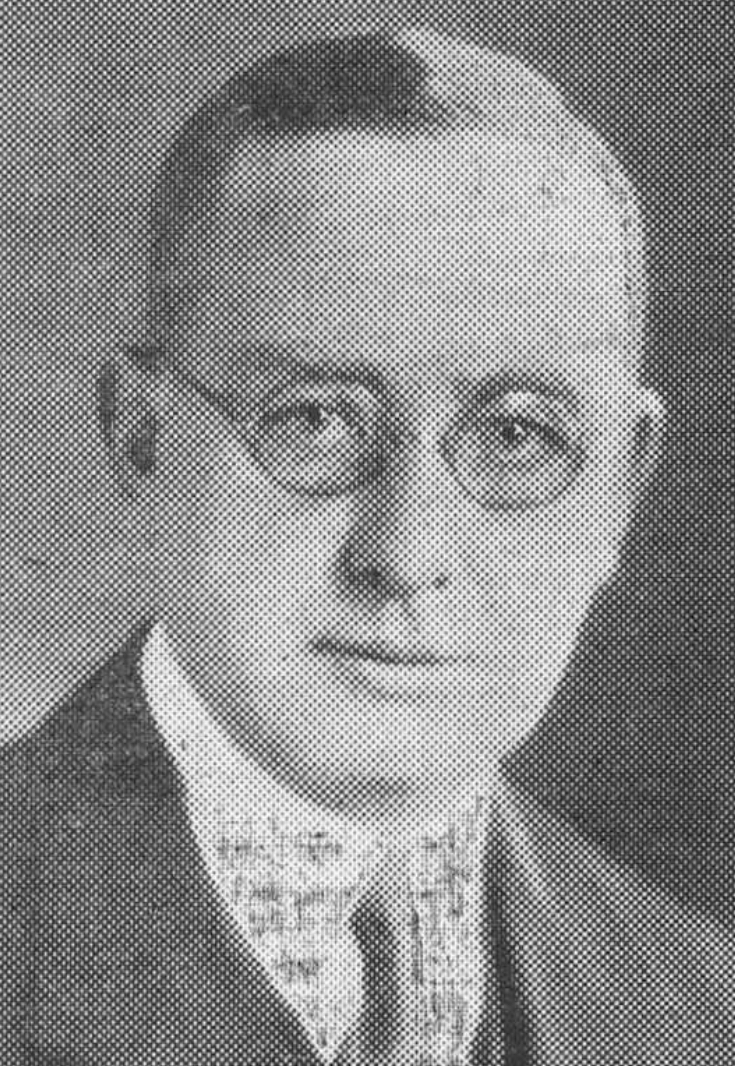

Ontario MPP
- In office 1929–1934
- Preceded by: George Smyth
- Succeeded by: Riding abolished
- Constituency: Dundas
- In office 1934–1955
- Preceded by: James Alfred Sanderson (in Grenville riding)
- Succeeded by: Frederick Cass
- Constituency: Grenville—Dundas

Personal details
- Born: August 24, 1884 Winchester, Ontario
- Died: March 15, 1976 (aged 91) Chesterville, Ontario
- Party: Progressive Conservative
- Spouse: Jean Kennedy Gibson (m. 1914)
- Occupation: Businessman

George Holmes Challies (August 26, 1884 – March 15, 1976) was an Ontario merchant and political figure. He represented Dundas and then Grenville—Dundas in the Legislative Assembly of Ontario as a Conservative and then Progressive Conservative member from 1929 to 1955.

He was born in Winchester, Ontario, the son of James George Challies and Margaret Bow. On May 27, 1914, he married Jean Kennedy Gibson, daughter of Matthew Gibson and Fanny Merkley, and granddaughter of former Dundas MP William Gibson in the House of Commons of Canada from 1872-78 . Jean died on March 27, 1929, at the age of 44 and was buried in Mount Pleasant Cemetery in Morrisburg, Ontario, Canada with her father and brother.

Challies was educated at the Ontario College of Pharmacy. In 1929, he was Reeve of Morrisburg. He was president of the Dominion Toilet Brush Company and Dominion Coach Lines. Challies served as Provincial Secretary and Registrar from 1931 to 1934 and as Minister without Portfolio from 1943 to 1948 and from 1949 to 1955. Challies was also a member of the Ontario Hydro-Electric Power Commission (later Ontario Hydro).

George H. Challies died on March 15, 1976, and was buried in Maple Ridge Cemetery in Chesterville, Ontario, Canada with his parents and maternal grandparents.
