= Jacob Dockstader Buell =

Canadian politician

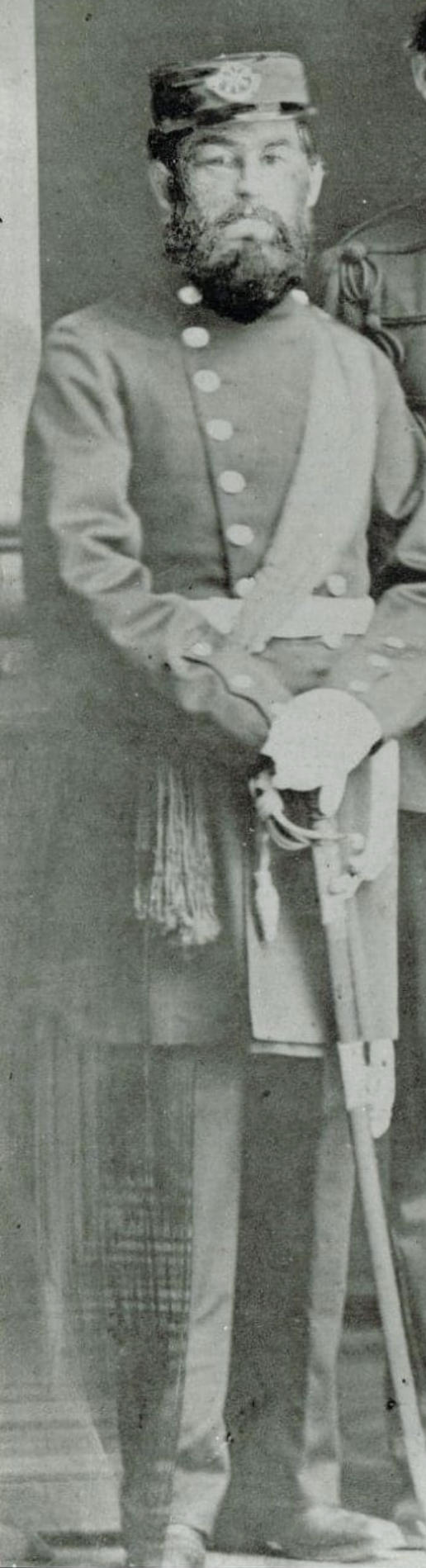
- Jacob Buell, Captain of the Brockville Infantry Company, 1866

Member of Parliament for Brockville
- In office 1872–1878
- Preceded by: James Crawford
- Succeeded by: William Fitzsimmons

Mayor of Brockville
- In office 1870–1876

Personal details
- Born: October 4, 1827 Brockville, Upper Canada
- Died: January 1, 1894 (aged 66) Brockville, Ontario
- Party: Liberal
- Relatives: William Buell, Jr. (father)
- Occupation: Lawyer, soldier, politician

Military service
- Allegiance: Canada
- Branch/service: Canadian militia
- Years of service: 1862 - 1870s
- Rank: Captain; Colonel
- Unit: Brockville Infantry Company
- Commands: 41st Brockville Battalion
- Battles/wars: Fenian Raids

Jacob Dockstader Buell (4 October 1827 – 1 January 1894) was a lawyer and political figure in Ontario, Canada. He represented Brockville in the House of Commons of Canada from 1872 to 1878 as a Liberal member.

He was born in Brockville, Upper Canada, the son of William Buell, and was educated there. He was called to the bar in 1854 and practised law in Brockville. His first wife was Susan Chaffey; after her death in 1857, he married Margaret Sophia Senkler in 1861. Buell was a Lieutenant-Colonel in the local militia, and raised the Brockville Infantry Company in 1862 after the Trent Affair. He served as mayor for Brockville for seven years. In 1871, Buell ran unsuccessfully for a seat in the provincial legislature. He was defeated by William Fitzsimmons in a bid for reelection to the federal seat in 1878.

== Electoral record ==
1872 Canadian federal election: Brockville
Party	Candidate	Votes
Liberal	Jacob Dockstader Buell	804
Unknown	Harry Braithwaite Abbott	793
Source: Canadian Elections Database

1874 Canadian federal election: Brockville
Party	Candidate	Votes
Liberal	Jacob Dockstader Buell	910
Conservative	J. Crawford	868
Source: open.canada.ca

1878 Canadian federal election: Brockville
Party	Candidate	Votes
Conservative	William Fitzsimmons	1,033
Liberal	Jacob Dockstader Buell	906
Source: Canadian Elections Database

Parliament of Canada
Preceded by James Crawford	Member of Parliament for Brockville; 1872–1878	Succeeded by William Fitzsimmons
