= Christopher Finlay Fraser =

Canadian politician

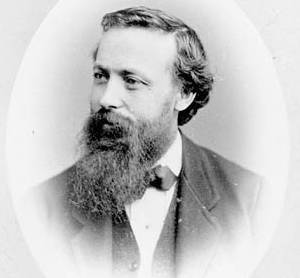

Ontario MPP
- In office 1879–1894
- Preceded by: Wilmot Howard Cole
- Succeeded by: George Augustus Dana
- Constituency: Brockville
- In office 1872–1879
- Preceded by: Mcneil Clarke
- Succeeded by: Frederick John French
- Constituency: Grenville South

Personal details
- Born: October 16, 1839 Brockville, Upper Canada
- Died: August 24, 1894 (aged 54) Toronto, Ontario
- Party: Liberal
- Spouse: Mary Ann Lafayette (m.1866)
- Children: 2
- Occupation: Lawyer

Christopher Finlay Fraser (October 16, 1839 – August 24, 1894) was an Ontario lawyer and political figure. He represented Grenville South in the Legislative Assembly of Ontario from 1872 to 1879 and Brockville from 1879 to 1894.

He was born in Brockville in Upper Canada in 1839. He worked as an apprentice at the Brockville Recorder while younger, articled in law, was called to the bar in 1864 and set up practice in Brockville. He was elected to the city council and also served as a lieutenant in the local militia. He was a member of the board of directors for the Ontario Bank and helped reorganize the finances of the Brockville and Ottawa Railway. He was a founding member of the Ontario Catholic League in 1869. He was named provincial secretary in 1873 and promoted to commissioner of Public Works the following year. In 1876, he was named Queen's Counsel. Fraser administered the rebuilding of the provincial parliament buildings at Queen's Park completed in 1894. During his time in office, Fraser served as a representative for Roman Catholic voters in the government of Oliver Mowat, defending their interests when he could and soothing their resentment when he couldn't.

He died in Toronto in 1894 after suffering a heart attack.

== Electoral history ==
=== Brockville ===
1867 Ontario general election: Brockville and Elizabethtown
Party	Candidate	Votes	%
Conservative	William Fitzsimmons	630	51.05
Liberal	Christopher Finlay Fraser	604	48.95
Total valid votes		1,234	75.38
Eligible voters		1,637	
Conservative pickup new district.			
Source: Elections Ontario

1879 Ontario general election: Brockville
Party	Candidate	Votes	%	±%
Liberal	Christopher Finlay Fraser	1,379	52.14	+0.63
Conservative	D. Mansell	1,266	47.86	−0.63
Total valid votes		2,645	60.33	−11.02
Eligible voters		4,384		
Liberal hold		Swing		+0.63
Source: Elections Ontario

=== Grenville South ===
Ontario provincial by-election, March 30, 1872: Grenville South Death of Mcneil Clarke
Party	Candidate	Votes	%
Liberal	Christopher Finlay Fraser	123	52.12
Independent	Mr. Ellis	113	47.88
Total valid votes		236	100.0
Election voided
Source: History of the Electoral Districts, Legislatures and Ministries of the Province of Ontario

Ontario provincial by-election, October 16, 1872: Grenville South Previous election voided
Party	Candidate	Votes	%	±%
Liberal	Christopher Finlay Fraser	894	55.02	+6.24
Independent	Mr. Cairns	731	44.98	
Total valid votes		1,625	100.0	+4.43
Liberal gain from Conservative		Swing		+6.24
Source: History of the Electoral Districts, Legislatures and Ministries of the Province of Ontario

Ontario provincial by-election, December 1873: Grenville South Ministerial by-election
Party	Candidate	Votes
Liberal	Christopher Finlay Fraser	Acclaimed
Source: History of the Electoral Districts, Legislatures and Ministries of the Province of Ontario

1875 Ontario general election: Grenville South
Party	Candidate	Votes	%
Liberal	Christopher Finlay Fraser	1,136	53.36
Conservative	J.C. Irvine	993	46.64
Turnout		2,129	71.04
Eligible voters		2,997	
Liberal hold			
Source: Elections Ontario

1879 Ontario general election: Grenville South
Party	Candidate	Votes	%	±%
Conservative	Frederick John French	1,205	53.01	+6.37
Liberal	Christopher Finlay Fraser	1,068	46.99	−6.37
Total valid votes		2,273	70.20	−0.84
Eligible voters		3,238		
Conservative gain from Liberal		Swing		+6.37
Source: Elections Ontario
