= John Culbert (Canadian politician) =

Canadian politician

John Culbert (August 21, 1847 – April 13, 1915) was a merchant and political figure in Ontario, Canada. He represented Brockville in the House of Commons of Canada from 1900 to 1904 as a Conservative.

He was born in Elizabethtown, Canada West, the son of Benjamin Culbert and Ann Roberts. In 1877, he married Charlotte L. McMillan. Culbert was mayor of Brockville. He was defeated when he ran for reelection to the House of Commons in 1904.
