= John Giles Lethbridge =

Canadian politician

Ontario MPP
- In office 1919–1929
- Preceded by: John Campbell Elliott
- Succeeded by: Lloyd William Morgan Freele
- Constituency: Middlesex West

Leader of the Progressives
- In office 1927–1929
- Preceded by: William Raney
- Succeeded by: Harry Nixon

Personal details
- Born: August 13, 1855 Fingal, Canada West
- Died: July 1, 1947 (aged 91)
- Party: United Farmers
- Spouse: Lydia Jane Tristain (m. 1880)
- Occupation: Farmer

John Giles Lethbridge (August 13, 1855 – 1947) was an Ontario farmer and political figure. He represented Middlesex West in the Legislative Assembly of Ontario from 1919 to 1929 as a United Farmers and then Progressive member.

== Background ==
He was born in Fingal, Canada West, the son of George Lethbridge who had come to Canada from England. In 1880, he married Lydian Jane Tristain. A farmer, he was educated at London Commercial College. He was appointed to Master and Secretary of the Dominion Grange, an agrarian advocacy organization.

== Politics ==
Following the resignation of William Raney, Lethbridge, at the age of 72, was elected leader of the Progressive Party on November 18, 1927, at a joint meeting of Progressive MPPs and the party executive.

As leader, Lethbridge supported a strong temperance policy in opposition to the liberalization of liquor laws by the government of Howard Ferguson. His leadership could not stop the decline of the party and in the 1929 provincial election the Progressive bloc elected only five MLAs with Lethbridge being one of the casualties.
