= George William Ross =

Canadian politician and Premier of Ontario

The Honourable Sir George William Ross
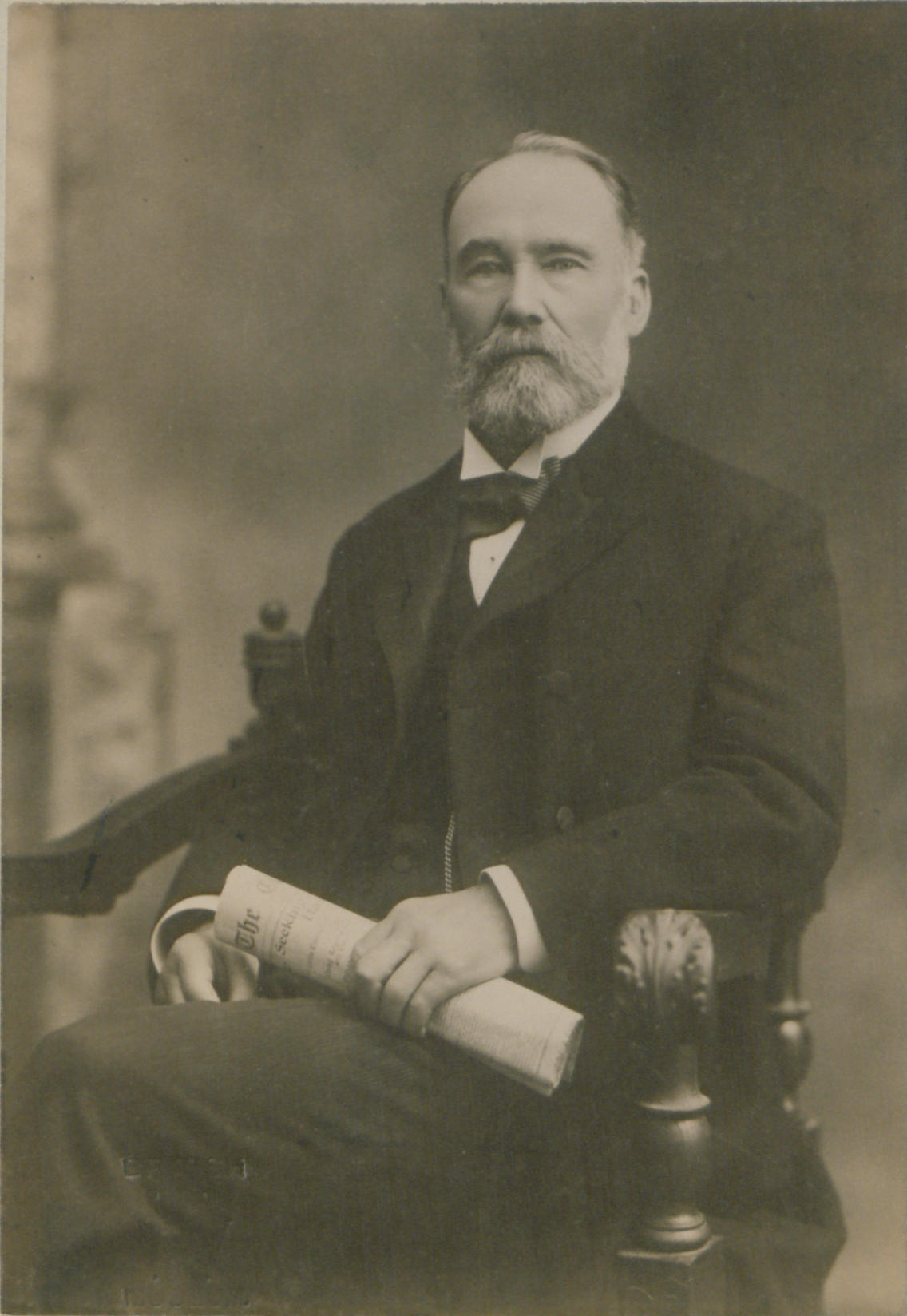
- Ross in 1901

5th Premier of Ontario
- In office October 21, 1899 – February 8, 1905
- Monarchs: Victoria; Edward VII
- Lieutenant Governor: Oliver Mowat; William Mortimer Clark
- Preceded by: Arthur Sturgis Hardy
- Succeeded by: James Whitney

Personal details
- Born: September 18, 1841 Nairn, Province of Canada
- Died: March 7, 1914 (aged 72) Toronto, Ontario
- Resting place: Mount Pleasant Cemetery, Toronto
- Party: Liberal
- Spouses: Christina Campbell; Catherine Boston; Mildred Margaret Peel

Sir George William Ross (September 18, 1841 – March 7, 1914) was an educator and politician in the Canadian province of Ontario. He was the fifth premier of Ontario from 1899 to 1905. He previously served as Ontario’s minister of education from 1883 to 1899, overseeing major expansion and centralization of the provincial school system.

Born in Middlesex County, Upper Canada, to Scottish Gaelic–speaking immigrants, Ross worked as a teacher, school inspector, and newspaper publisher before entering federal politics in 1872. He moved to provincial politics in 1883 and, as minister of education in the government of Oliver Mowat, promoted public libraries, expanded kindergarten instruction, and strengthened teacher training.

As premier, Ross supported the development of Northern Ontario and resource industries. His government, weakened by internal divisions and controversy, was defeated in the 1905 provincial election by the Conservatives under James P. Whitney. He later served in the Senate of Canada and was knighted in 1910.

== Early life ==
Born near Nairn, in Middlesex County, Upper Canada, Ross worked as a school teacher, a school inspector and a newspaper publisher before he got into politics.

Ross's parents had emigrated from Tain in the Highlands of Scotland in 1831 and the language of his youth was Scottish Gaelic. He, along with his fellow Canadian Gaels, held a lifelong love for the language. As a tribute, a short biographical account of Ross was printed in Gaelic in Ontario in the year following his death.

== Early political career ==
He was first elected to the House of Commons of Canada as a Liberal in the 1872 election, and was re-elected in the 1874 and 1878 elections. During his time as an MP, he actively defended the Canada Temperance Act, which favoured the "local option" approach for implementing prohibition.

He was initially declared re-elected again in the 1882 election, but his victory was challenged, and the next year the vote was declared void.

Rather than run again, Ross moved to provincial politics when he was offered the position of Minister of Education for Ontario in the Liberal government of Sir Oliver Mowat in 1883. He oversaw the transformation of former mechanics' institutes into more than 300 public libraries, the expansion of the kindergarten system, and the creation of a provincial School of Pedagogy for the training of school inspectors and masters. Ross increased grants to the education system, expanded the authority of the provincial Department of Education, and oversaw the expansion of the university system and the federation of a number of smaller colleges with the University of Toronto. He also, controversially, established an oligopoly for the supply of textbooks to Ontario schools that was in effect from 1885 until 1907.

Ross implemented a system of gradated education from kindergarten (a new innovation that Ross was the first to recognise as part of the provincial school system) to university, unifying what had been separately organised systems. During his time as Minister of Education (1883–99), Ross established both Arbor Day and Empire Day, in order to inculcate in students both the desire to keep the school grounds attractive as well as a sense of patriotism. With regard to this latter, under his ministry, both Canadian history and military training became part of the curriculum in high schools in Ontario. This mandatory cadet training became controversial with the general public after the two World Wars, and was finally phased out entirely in 1944.

The Conservative opposition protested against the possibility of increased support for the Catholic Church's Separate school system, while the Catholic minority agitated for the same high schools and other facilities that the public (Protestant) school system enjoyed. The Protestant Protective Association was formed by Orangemen in the 1890s to oppose the expansion of Catholic rights, and to attempt to exclude Catholics from public life in the province.

== Premier of Ontario ==
After Mowat's retirement as Premier, and a short interregnum triggered by Arthur S. Hardy, Ross became Premier (and Provincial Treasurer) on October 21, 1899. Nicknamed as the "Father of New Ontario", he was present in the development of Northern Ontario:

- promoting the development of its natural resources through extending manufacturing conditions already in effect for pine timber to spruce and other softwood,
- introducing a bounty on the refining of nickel ore within the province,
- initiating a survey of Northern Ontario, which promoted the potential of the Great Clay Belt for settlement, and
- establishing the Temiskaming and Northern Ontario Railway.

The Liberal government was tired, however, after almost thirty years in office, and Ross could do little to revive its fortunes. In the provincial election of 1902, the Liberal majority was cut to one seat, but at a time when parties lacked the discipline over their members they would later develop, that was not enough for a secure government.

The Ross administration was rocked by a series of controversies in its second term:

- a vote-buying scandal based on allegations brought forward by Robert Roswell Gamey engulfed the government,
- demands for prohibition split the party,
- support for the insolvent industrial empire of Francis Hector Clergue in Sault Ste. Marie led to charges of favouritism, and
- its reluctance towards the cause of public ownership of electricity generation was strongly criticized by the Opposition under James Pliny Whitney, especially when it was revealed that The Manufacturers Life Insurance Company (of which Ross was President) was a significant investor in the Electrical Development Company.

Leading a stagnating and drifting government, Ross called an election for January 25, 1905, in which the Liberals lost 22 seats and the Conservatives under James P. Whitney won 69, making Whitney the new Premier.

== Senator ==
Ross remained Liberal leader until 1907, when Prime Minister Wilfrid Laurier recommended him for an appointment to the Senate of Canada. In 1910, Ross received a knighthood from King George V for his years of public service in both Federal and Provincial politics. He wrote two books about his life in politics, and died in 1914.

== Family ==
Ross was the father of Duncan Campbell Ross, who sat in the Legislative Assembly of Ontario representing Middlesex West from 1907 to 1908 and Middlesex North from 1908 to 1909, and later as an MP for Middlesex West from 1909 to 1921.

Parliament of Canada
| Preceded by Angus Peter McDonald | MP for Middlesex West; 1872–1883 | Succeeded by Donald Mackenzie Cameron |
| Preceded by Alexander Vidal (for Sarnia) | Ontario Senator for Middlesex; 1907-1914 ♰ | Succeeded by indeterminate |
| Preceded by Richard John Cartwright | Leader of the Opposition in the Senate; 1912–1914 ♰ | Succeeded by Hewitt Bostock |
Legislative Assembly of Ontario
| Preceded by Alexander Johnston | MLA for Middlesex West; 1883–1908 | Succeeded by John Campbell Elliott |
Mowat ministry, Province of Ontario (1872–1896)
| Preceded by Adam Crooks | Minister of Education; 1883-1896 | Succeeded by self in Hardy ministry |
Hardy ministry, Province of Ontario (1896–1899)
| Preceded by self in Mowat ministry | Minister of Education; 1896-1899 | Succeeded by Richard Harcourt |
Ross ministry, Province of Ontario (1899–1905)
| Preceded by Arthur S. Hardy | Premier of Ontario; 1899–1905 | Succeeded by Sir James P. Whitney |
| Preceded by Richard Harcourt | Treasurer; 1899–1905 | Succeeded by Arthur Matheson |
Party political offices
| Preceded by Arthur S. Hardy | Leader of the Ontario Liberal Party; 1899–1907 | Succeeded by George P. Graham |
