= Robert McCubbin =

Canadian politician

Member of Parliament for Middlesex West
- In office March 1940 – June 1957

Personal details
- Born: 16 June 1902 Springbank, Ontario, Canada
- Died: 28 February 1975 (aged 72)
- Party: Liberal
- Spouse(s): Lottie Squires (m. 26 February 1937)
- Profession: farmer

Robert McCubbin (16 June 1902 – 28 February 1975) was a Liberal party member of the House of Commons of Canada. He was born in Springbank, Ontario and became a farmer by career.

McCubbin was a councillor for East Williams Township from 1924 to 1926, becoming the municipality's Reeve between 1927 and 1930. He also served as Reeve again in 1939.

He was first elected at the Middlesex West riding in the 1940 general election and re-elected there in 1945, 1949 and 1953. McCubbin was defeated by William Howell Arthur Thomas of the Progressive Conservative party in the 1957 election.

Robert McCubbin was inducted into the Middlesex County Hall of Fame in 2008, which was accepted by his three nephews: Bruce, Paul and Ronald McCubbin.
