= Nathaniel Currie =

Canadian politician

Ontario MPP
- In office 1867–1871
- Preceded by: Riding established
- Succeeded by: Alexander Mackenzie, John Watterworth (1872)
- Constituency: Middlesex West

Personal details
- Born: c. 1825 Upper Canada
- Died: January 18, 1889 (aged 63) Mosa Twp, Ontario
- Party: Progressive Conservative
- Spouse: Elizabeth Weeks
- Children: 10
- Occupation: Farmer, Justice of the peace

Nathaniel Currie (Curry) (1825–1889) was elected MPP in the 1st Legislative Assembly of Ontario during the Confederation elections of 1867. Born of Irish immigrants in Chinguacousy, Upper Canada, the family farmed in the Glencoe area. His father, Nathaniel Currie Sn. petitioned for land in Mosa County, from York where he had originally petitioned for land in Upper Canada. Currie married Elizabeth Weeks in Mosa in 1845 having ten children together. He was buried in the Oakland Cemetery, Mosa, Row 11, no. 17 at age 74.

As an early settler of Mosa Township, he became a Conservative provincial political figure and later Reeve of Glencoe village for many years. Reeve Currie, the unofficial founder of the village, is reputed to have upheld the Black Donnellys' right to walk freely in the streets of Glencoe. He did not run in the election in 1871 but did run again for the Provincial Legislature in 1882, losing to George William Ross by a vote of 1651–1597.

== Parliamentary work ==
=== Committees ===
As an MPP, he worked on the following committees:

- Standing Committee on Railways
- Select Committee to consider Bill 46 (To Prevent the Setting of Fires at certain seasons of the year)
- Select Committee to consider Bill 91 (To Prevent the spreading of Canada Thistle in Upper Canada—Chapter 40
- Select Committee to consider Bill 58 (An Act regulating Line fences and Watercourses)
- Select Committee to consider Bill 37 (To Amend the Jury law)
- Select Committee to consider the expediency of altering and amending the existing municipal and assessment laws of Ontario
- Select Committee to consider Bill 30, An Act for the Encouragement of Agriculture, Horticulture, Arts and Manufactures
- Select Committee to consider Bill 68, An Act amend the Act respecting joint Stock Companies for the construction of Roads and other works in Upper Canada
- Special Committee to consider the Municipal and Assessments Act

=== Bills introduced ===
Currie introduced a bill in March 1874 to provide for female suffrage and the political representation of real property according to value. The bill stated that real property should be the basis of the vote and dual or plural votes per property should be allowed. Women of age holding property should be included in this vote. After much discussion the Farmers' Sons Franchise Act was passed in 1877, providing the vote to sons of land owners on the basis of property according to value, but not women.

== Community work ==
- Municipal Council (Glencoe)
- County Council (Mosa)
- Director of the Agricultural Society 1879
- President of the Agricultural Society 1883-6
- Committee to erect a local high school
- Committee to acquire land for a local cemetery
- Local Justice for Glencoe, Ontario.

== Notes of interest ==
Nathaniel Currie was one of two justices involved in the Emma Rees case. Emma Rees was a lieutenant in the Glencoe Salvation Army in 1886. The Salvation Army was a target for local persecution while Rees commanded a local detachment of the Army. A few residents of Glencoe, including some of the Donnelly clan, were fined and convicted for their activities against the Army and Rees was fined for assault. Rees appealed her conviction and charged Justices Simpson and Currie with unlawful arrest. She eventually won her suit and collected $700.

== Electoral history ==
1867 Ontario general election: Middlesex West
| Party | Candidate | Votes | % |
|---|---|---|---|
| Conservative | Nathaniel Currie | 1,100 | 52.08 |
| Liberal | Mr. Campbell | 1,012 | 47.92 |
| Total valid votes | | 2,112 | 87.45 |
| Eligible voters | | 2,415 | |
| Conservative pickup new district. | | | |
Source: Elections Ontario

1871 Ontario general election: Middlesex West
| Party | Candidate | Votes | % | ±% |
|---|---|---|---|---|
| Liberal | Alexander Mackenzie | 1,362 | 58.81 | +10.89 |
| Conservative | Nathaniel Currie | 954 | 41.19 | −10.89 |
| Turnout | | 2,316 | 77.17 | −10.28 |
| Eligible voters | | 3,001 | | |
| Liberal gain from Conservative | | Swing | | +10.89 |
Source: Elections Ontario

1875 Ontario general election: Middlesex West
| Party | Candidate | Votes | % | ±% |
|---|---|---|---|---|
| Liberal | John Watterworth | 1,415 | 54.30 | +2.36 |
| Conservative | Nathaniel Currie | 1,191 | 45.70 | |
| Total valid votes | | 2,606 | 71.36 | |
| Eligible voters | | 3,652 | | |
| Liberal hold | | Swing | | +2.36 |
Source: Elections Ontario
