= John Douglas Fraser Drummond =

Canadian politician

Member of the Canadian Parliament for Middlesex West
- In office 1921–1925
- Preceded by: Duncan Campbell Ross
- Succeeded by: John Campbell Elliott

Personal details
- Born: April 23, 1860 McGillivray Township, Canada West, British Canada
- Died: May 24, 1925 (aged 65) Ottawa, Ontario, Canada
- Party: Progressive

John Douglas Fraser Drummond (April 23, 1860 – May 24, 1925) was a Canadian farmer and politician.

He was the Progressive Middlesex West Member of Parliament from 1921 until his death in 1925.
