= RCAF Station Fingal =

Former Royal Canadian Air Force station

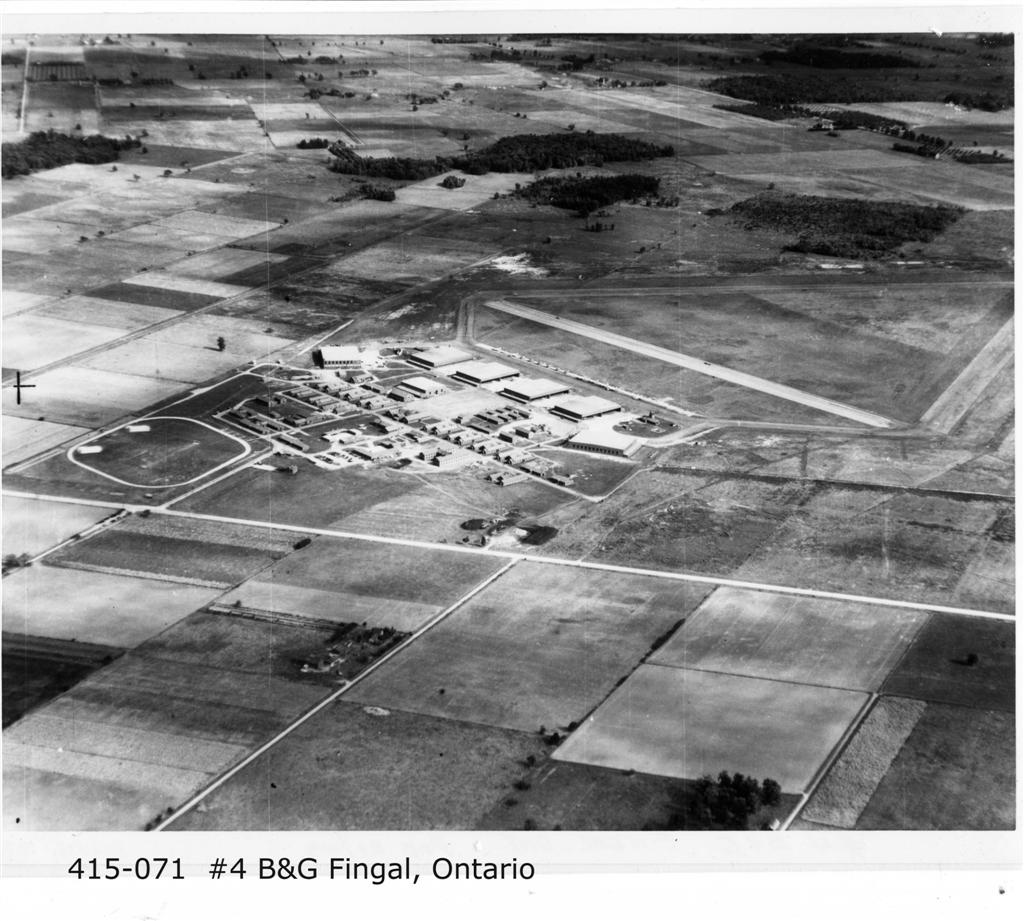
- Fingal in the 1940s
- Active: 25 November 1940 – 17 February 1945
- Country: Canada
- Branch: Royal Canadian Air Force
- Role: British Commonwealth Air Training Plan; Aircrew training
- Part of: No. 1 Training Command
- Schools: No. 4 Bombing and Gunnery School
- Station Magazine: Fingal Observer

Commanders
- W/C: W. D. Van Vliet - 1940

Aircraft flown
- Trainer: Avro Anson; Fairey Battle; Westland Lysander; Bristol Bolingbroke; Northrop Nomad; North American Harvard; North American Yale

RCAF Station Fingal was a Second World War British Commonwealth Air Training Plan (BCATP) air station located near Fingal, Ontario, Canada. It was operated and administered by the Royal Canadian Air Force (RCAF).

Fingal hosted No. 4 Bombing and Gunnery School (No. 4 B&GS), which trained bomb aimers and air gunners. The school opened on 25 November 1940 and closed on 17 February 1945. Aircraft used included the Fairey Battle, Northrop Nomad, Westland Lysander, Bristol Bolingbroke and Avro Anson. When No. 4 B&GS closed, its fleet of aircraft consisted of 34 Avro Anson Mark I, 29 Bristol Bolingbroke Mark IVT, and 1 North American Harvard II. Bombing ranges were located near Melbourne, Frome, Tempo, and Dutton. A bombing range was also located on Lake Erie. A marine unit was based in Port Stanley.

The area is now a wildlife preserve called the "Fingal Wildlife Management Area". Wildlife habitat has been restored, and some area has been set aside for agricultural demonstration purposes. Interpretive trails with signage have been installed.

== Aerodrome information ==
The airfield was constructed in a typical BCATP wartime pattern, with three runways formed in a triangle. In approximately 1942, the aerodrome was listed at 42°41′N 81°19′W with a Var. 5 degrees W and elevation of 705 feet (215 m). The runway outlines are still clearly visible in aerial photographs. Three runways were listed as follows:

Runway Name	Length	Width	Surface
1/19	3,182 feet (970 m)	150 feet (46 m)	Not Listed
14/32	2,944 feet (897 m)	150 feet (46 m)	Not Listed
7/25	2,820 feet (860 m)	150 feet (46 m)	Not Listed

== Fingal scenes ==
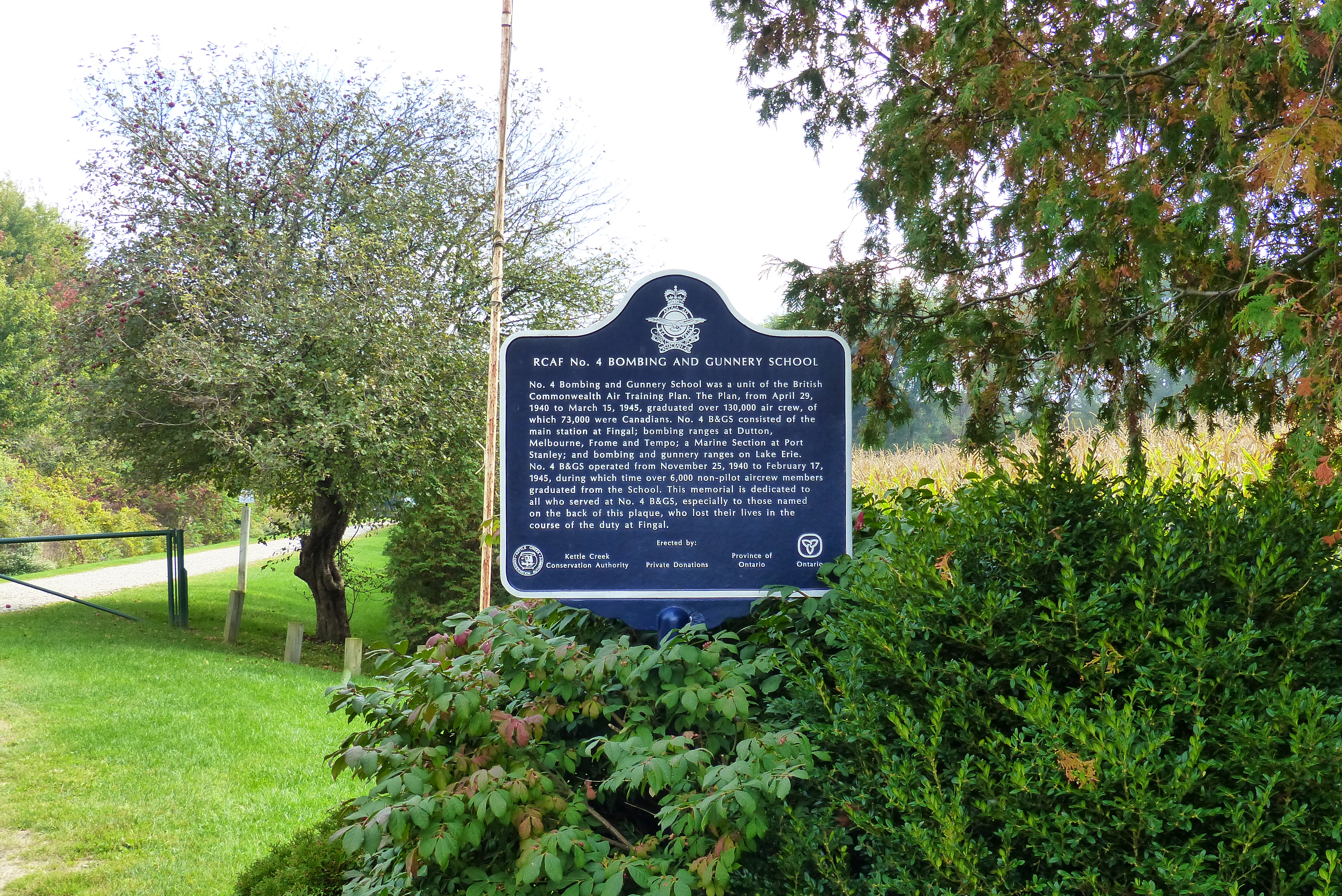
Historical plaque

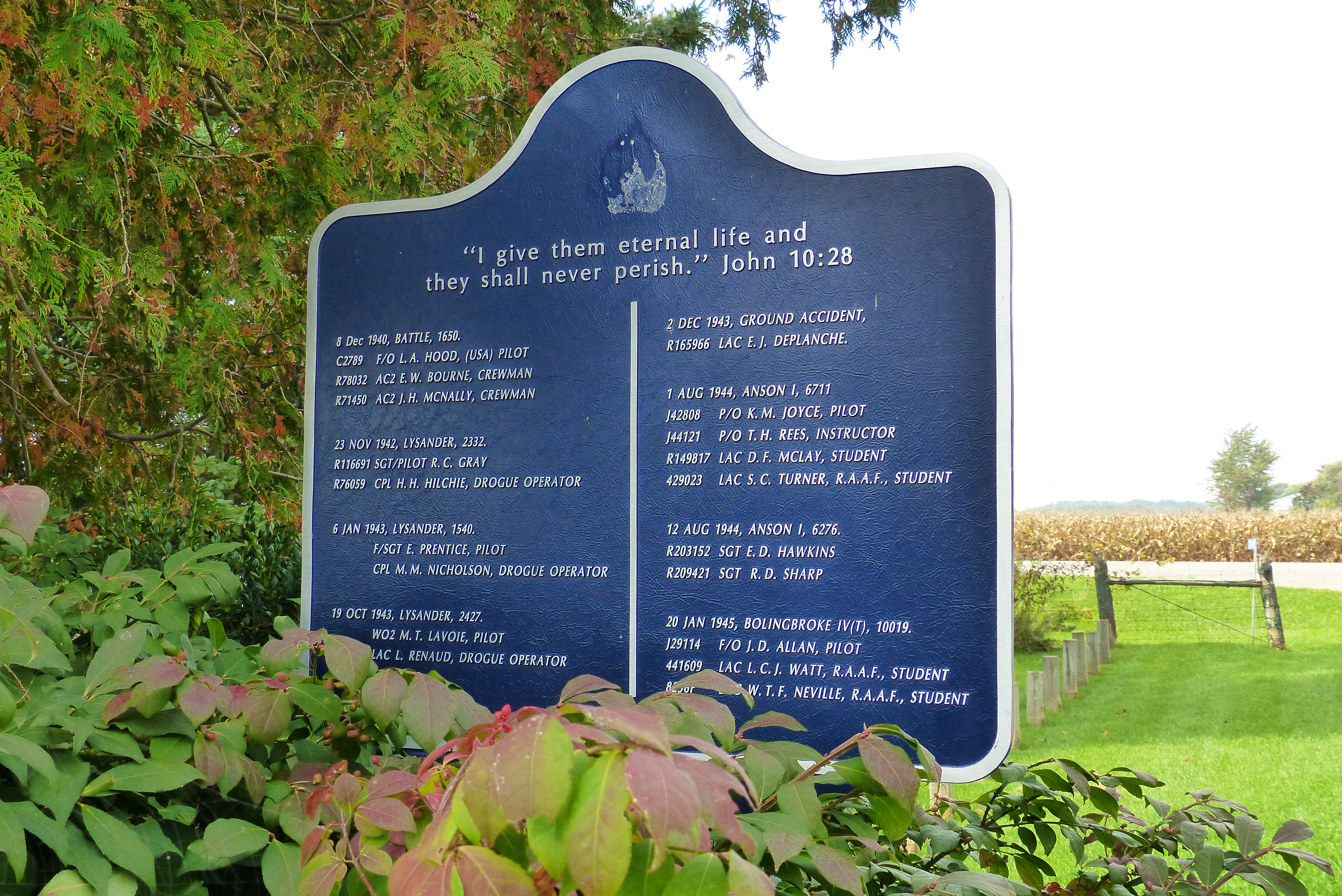
Back of plaque, list of casualties

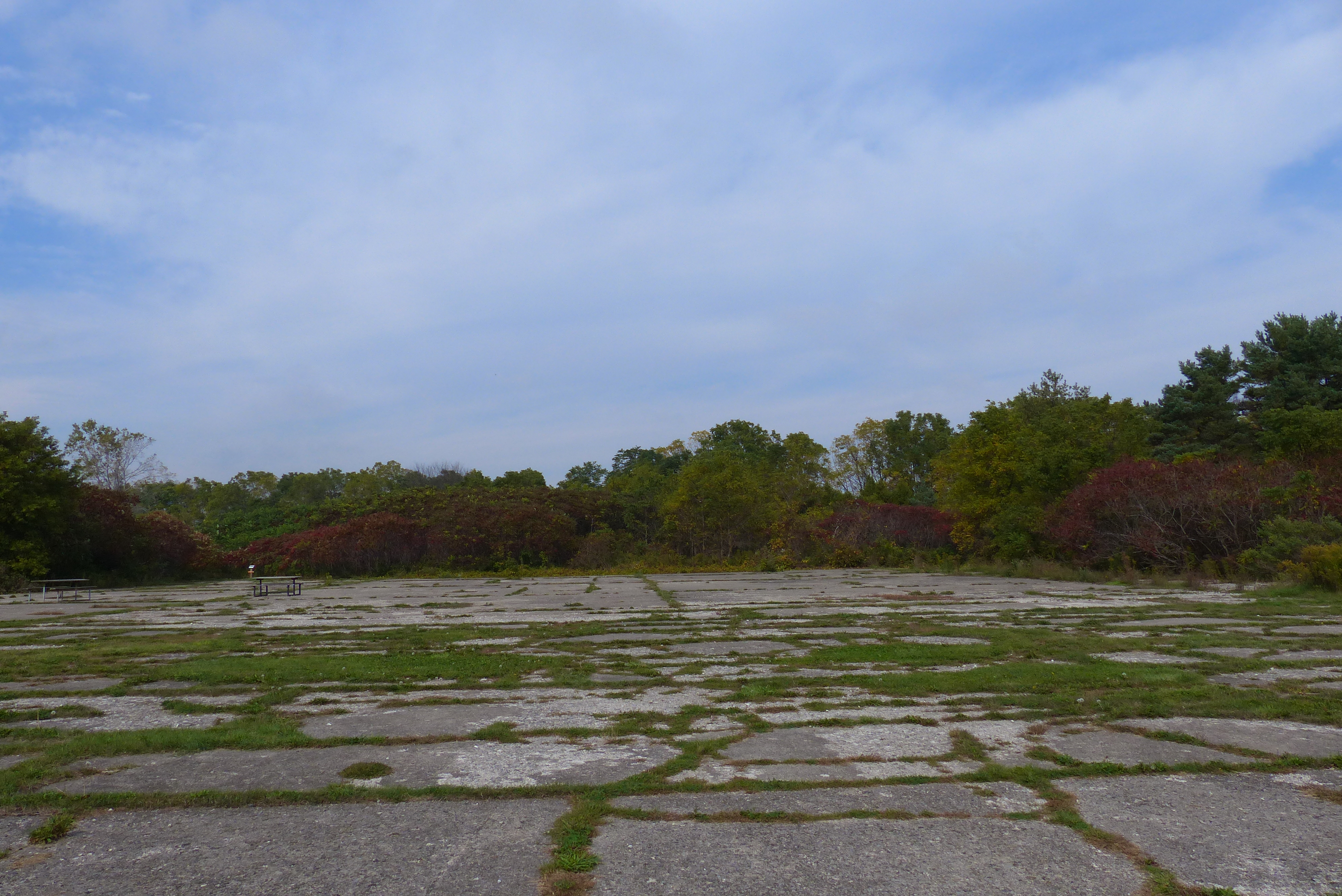
Double hangar base in 2014

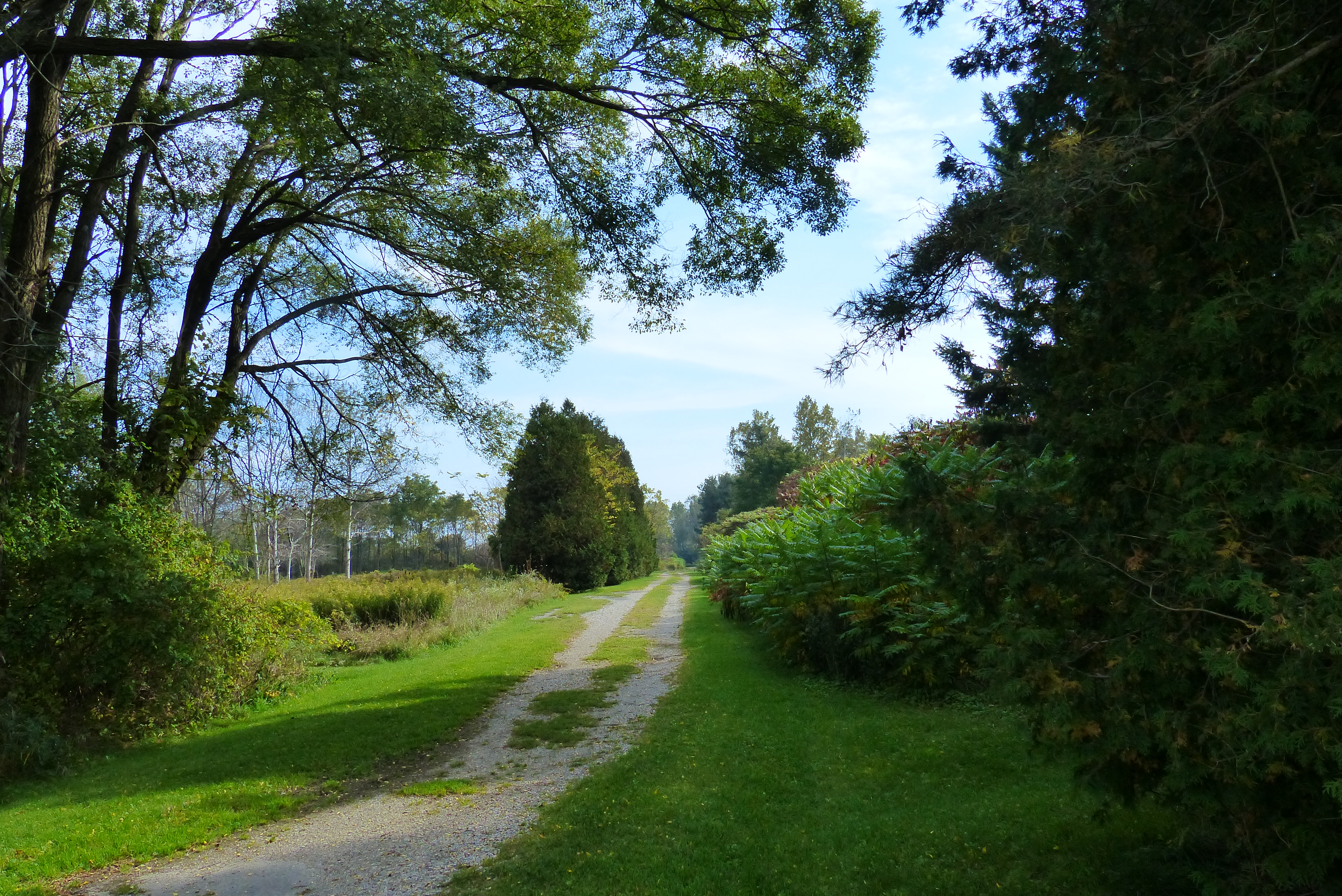
Roadway in 2014

== See also ==
- St. Thomas Municipal Airport (Ontario)
- RCAF Station Guelph
- RCAF Station Jarvis
- No. 6 Group RCAF
- Canadian Warplane Heritage Museum
