= William Samuel Calvert =

Canadian politician

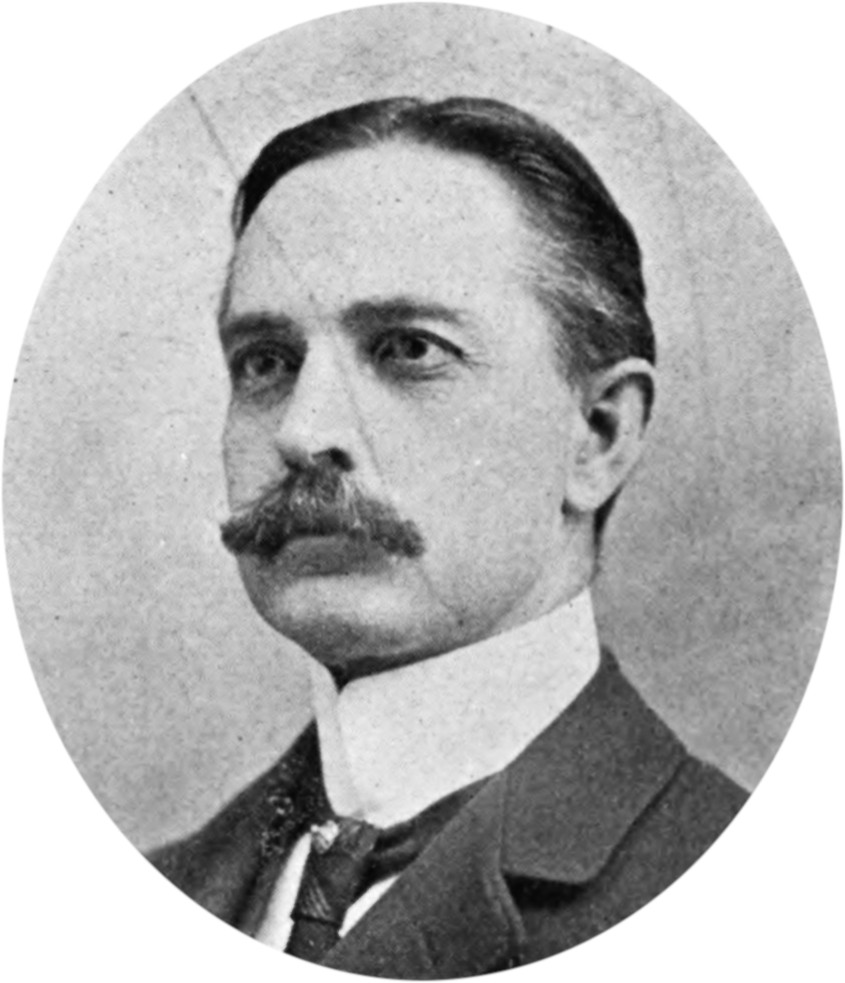

Member of the Canadian Parliament for Middlesex West
- In office 1896–1909
- Preceded by: William Frederick Roome
- Succeeded by: Duncan Campbell Ross

Personal details
- Born: March 3, 1859 Warwick Township, Canada West
- Died: February 22, 1930 (aged 70)
- Party: Liberal
- Portfolio: Chief Government Whip (1901-1909); Whip of the Liberal Party (1901-1909)

William Samuel Calvert (March 3, 1859 – February 22, 1930) was a Canadian politician.

Born in Township of Warwick, Lambton County, Canada West, Calvert was educated at the Public School of Warwick and at Watford Seminary. A manufacturer, he was Reeve of Metcalfe and Warden of Middlesex. He was first elected to the House of Commons of Canada for the electoral district of Middlesex West in the general elections of 1896. A Liberal, he was re-elected in 1900, 1904 and 1908. He resigned in 1909 when he was appointed member of the National Transcontinental Railway Commission. From 1901 to 1909, he was the Chief Government Whip.
