= St. Thomas Municipal Airport (Ontario) =

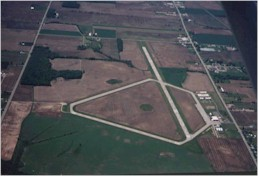
- IATA: YQS; ICAO: CYQS

Summary
- Airport type: Public
- Operator: Municipality of St. Thomas
- Location: St. Thomas, Ontario
- Time zone: EST (UTC−05:00)
  - Summer (DST): EDT (UTC−04:00)
- Elevation AMSL: 779 ft (237 m)
- Coordinates: 42°46′12″N 081°06′35″W
- Website: https://www.stthomas.ca/business-development/airport/

Map
- Location in Ontario CYQS (Canada)

Runways
Direction	Length		Surface
Direction	ft	m	Surface
03/21	2,607	795	Asphalt
09/27	5,013	1,528	Asphalt
15/33	2,610	796	Asphalt

Statistics (2006)
- Aircraft movements: 944
- Source: Canada Flight Supplement; Movements from Statistics Canada

St. Thomas Municipal Airport (IATA: YQS, ICAO: CYQS) located 3.5 nautical miles (6.5 km; 4.0 mi) east of St. Thomas, Ontario, Canada is a small airport serving the general aviation needs of the area. It was established in 1941 as an air training base for the British Commonwealth Air Training Program. The base was operated by the Department of National Defence until the late 1940s as a relief field for No. 14 Service Flying Training School Aylmer, Ontario and No. 4 Bombing & Gunnery School Fingal, Ontario. It has three runways, and four IFR approaches.

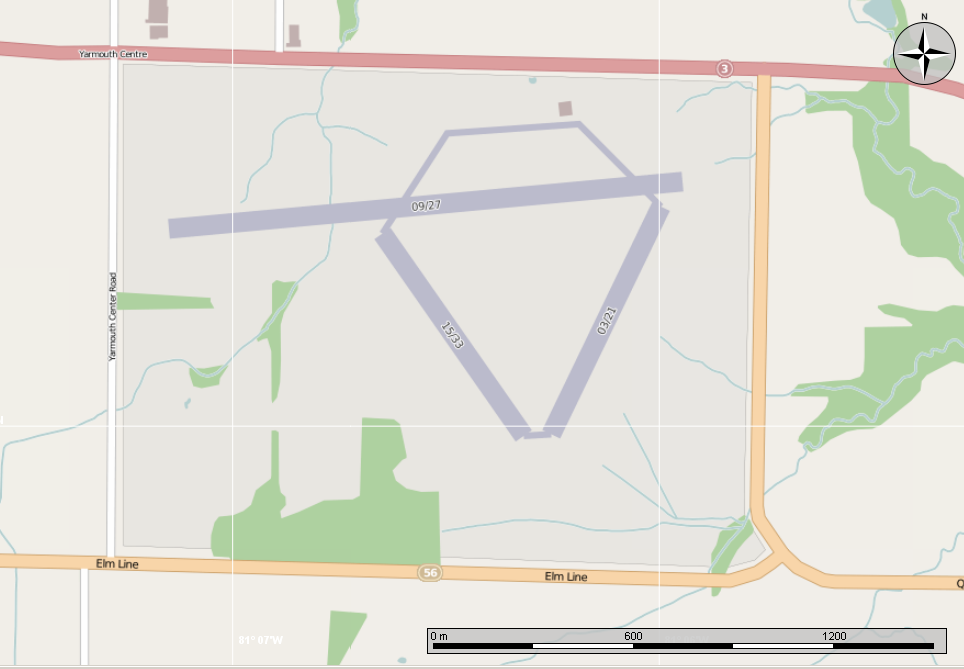
Map of the airport

The airport is classified as an airport of entry by Nav Canada and is staffed by the Canada Border Services Agency (CBSA) on a call-out basis from the London International Airport. CBSA officers at this airport can handle general aviation aircraft only, with no more than 15 passengers.

The airport was purchased by the City of St. Thomas in 1970. The runways were built approximately 2,640 ft (805 m) long, but the main east west runway (09/27) was expanded to 5,050 ft (1,539 m) in 1982.

The airport is in uncontrolled airspace but has a UNICOM operating during working hours on 122.70 MHz.

There are two flight training schools operating out of the airport, one for fixed wing and one for helicopter. There are many agricultural aircraft in the summer.

In 2002 St. Thomas reported 27,456 aircraft movements, but over the following years the numbers dropped. In 2003 there were 17,371, followed by 13,720 in 2004 and 12,575 in 2005. In 2006 there were 944 movements reported during a 24-day period in January, and no more reports were made for the rest of the year.

Runway 15/33 has been listed as closed since at least August 2017. The current NOTAM indicates that it was supposed to reopen in August 2020.

== Historical aerodrome information ==
In approximately 1942 the aerodrome was listed as "RCAF Aerodrome - St. Thomas, Ontario" at 42°46′N 81°07′W with a variation of 5 degrees west and elevation of 760 ft (230 m). The field was listed as "all hard surfaced" and had three runways listed as follows:

Runway name	Length	Width	Surface
15/33	2,600 ft (790 m)	100 ft (30 m)	Hard surfaced
9/27	2,600 ft (790 m)	100 ft (30 m)	Hard surfaced
3/21	2,600 ft (790 m)	100 ft (30 m)	Hard surfaced

== BCATP buildings from 1941 ==
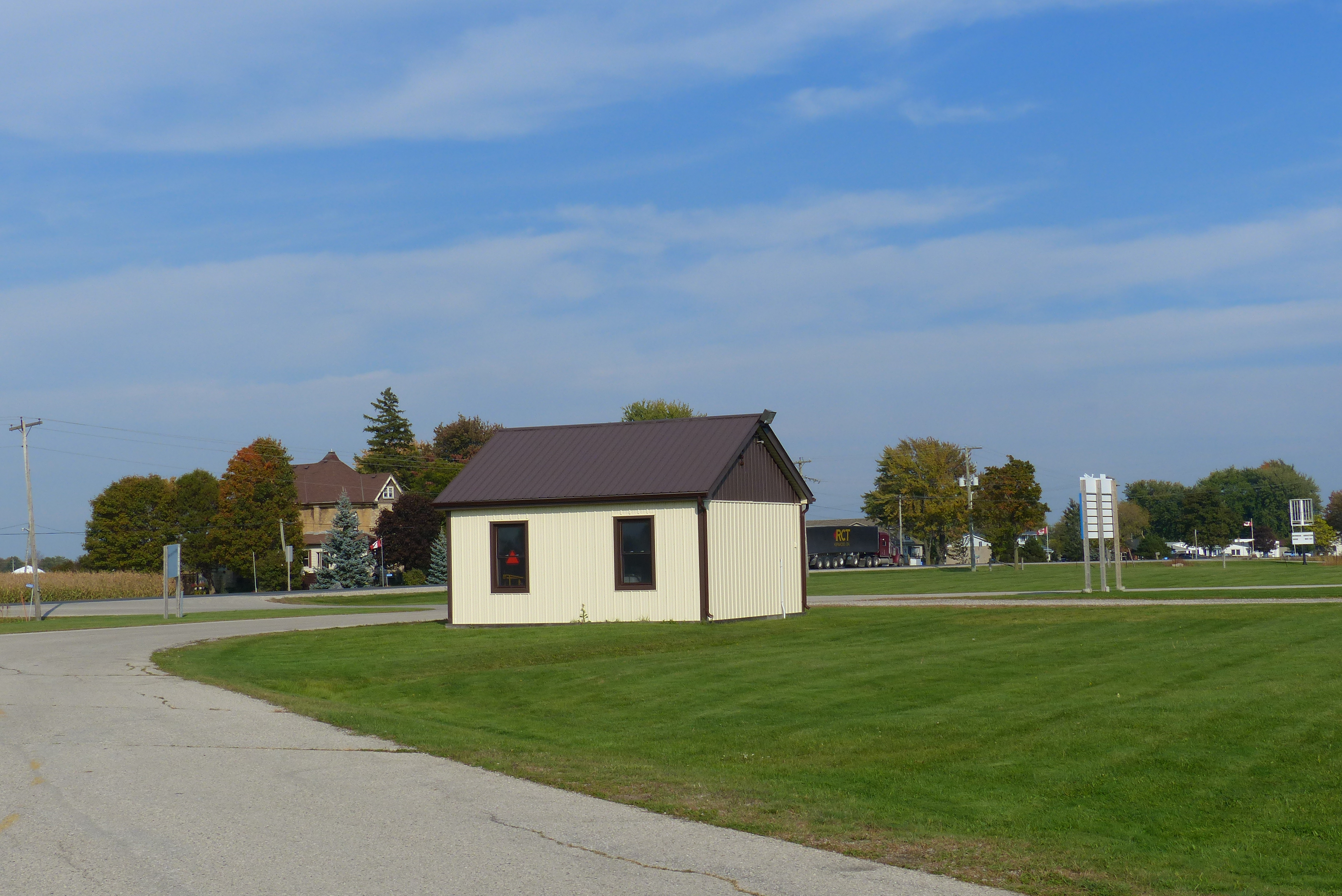
Pumphouse

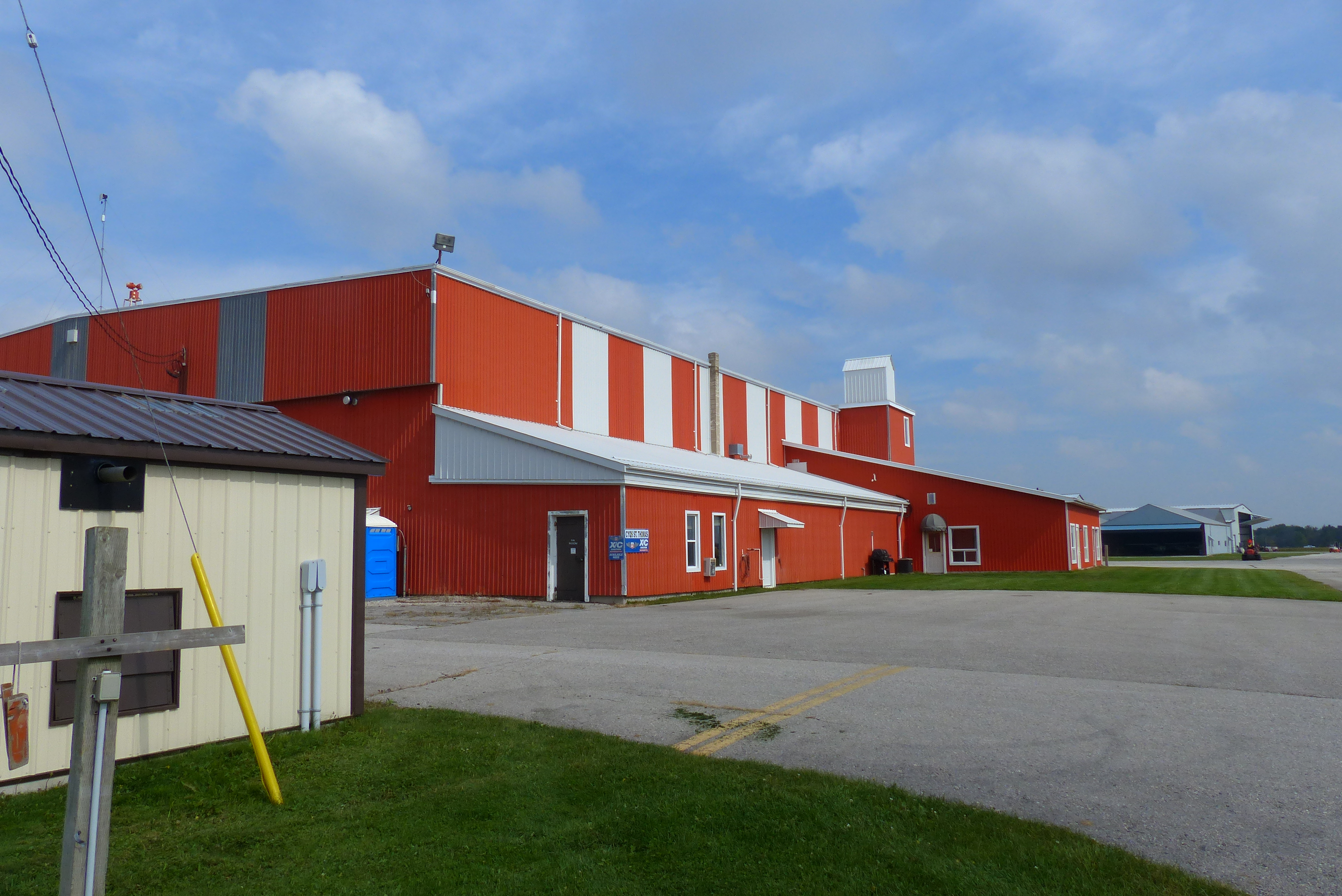
Hangar, apron side

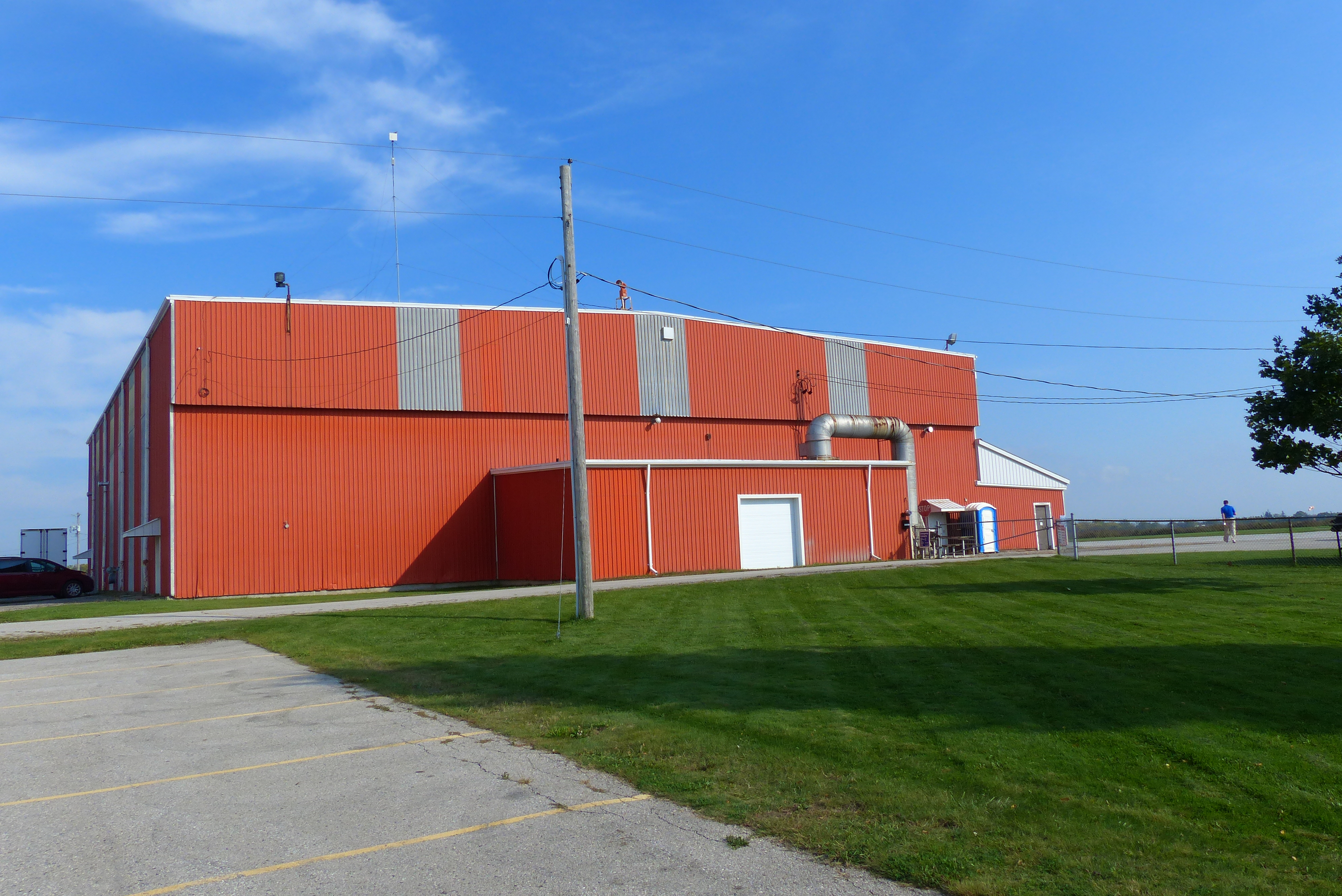
Hangar, furnace end

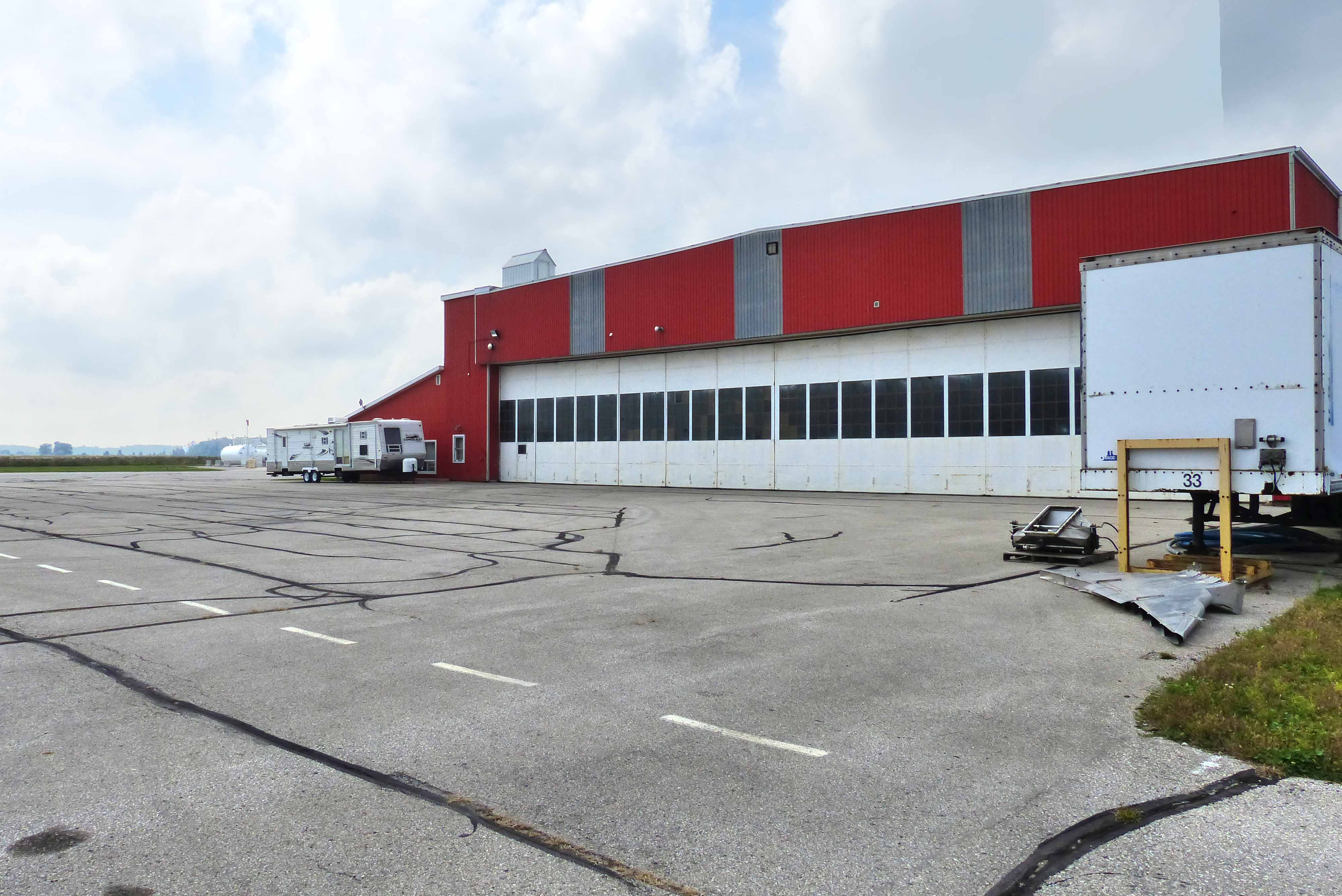
Hangar, doors
