= Middlesex West (provincial electoral district) =

Former provincial electoral district in Ontario, Canada

Ontario electoral district

Defunct provincial electoral district
- Legislature: Legislative Assembly of Ontario
- District created: 1867
- District abolished: 1933
- First contested: 1867
- Last contested: 1929

Middlesex West was an electoral riding in Ontario, Canada. It was created in 1867 at the time of confederation. It was renamed Middlesex South in 1933 before the 1934 election.

== Members of Provincial Parliament ==
Middlesex West
Assembly	Years	Member	Party
1st	1867–1871	Nathaniel Currie	Conservative
2nd	1871–1871	Alexander Mackenzie	Liberal
2nd	1872–1875	John Watterworth	Liberal
3rd	1875–1879	John Watterworth	Liberal
4th	1879–1883	John Watterworth	Liberal
5th	1883–1883	Alexander Johnston	Conservative
5th	1883–1886	George William Ross	Liberal
6th	1886–1890	George William Ross	Liberal
7th	1890–1894	George William Ross	Liberal
8th	1894–1898	George William Ross	Liberal
9th	1898–1902	George William Ross	Liberal
10th	1902–1905	George William Ross	Liberal
11th	1905–1907	George William Ross	Liberal
11th	1907–1908	Duncan Campbell Ross	Liberal
12th	1908–1911	John Campbell Elliott	Liberal
13th	1911–1914	John Campbell Elliott	Liberal
14th	1914–1919	John Campbell Elliott	Liberal
15th	1919–1923	John Giles Lethbridge	United Farmers
16th	1923–1926	John Giles Lethbridge	United Farmers
17th	1926–1929	John Giles Lethbridge	United Farmers
18th	1929–1934	Lloyd William Morgan Freele	Conservative
Sourced from the Ontario Legislative Assembly
Renamed Middlesex South riding after 1934

== Election results ==
1929 Ontario general election
Party	Candidate	Votes	%	±%
Conservative	Lloyd William Morgan Freele	3,371	34.81	–1.84
Progressive	John Giles Lethbridge	3,185	32.89	–30.47
Liberal	Thomas G. Turnbull	3,129	32.31	–
Total valid votes		9,685	99.60	
Total rejected ballots		39	0.40	+0.03
Turnout		9,724	72.71	+5.76
Eligible voters		13,374		
Conservative gain from Progressive		Swing		+14.32
Source: Elections Ontario

1926 Ontario general election
Party	Candidate	Votes	%	±%
Progressive	John Giles Lethbridge	5,723	63.36	+11.33
Conservative	John Hamilton Barr	3,310	36.64	–
Total valid votes		9,033	99.63	
Total rejected ballots		34	0.38	–0.29
Turnout		9,067	66.94	+0.57
Eligible voters		13,544		
Progressive hold		Swing		+5.66
Source: Elections Ontario

1923 Ontario general election
Party	Candidate	Votes	%	±%
United Farmers	John Giles Lethbridge	2,642	52.03	–23.56
Liberal	Charles Maitland MacFie	2,436	47.97	–
Total valid votes		5,078	99.33	
Total rejected ballots		34	0.67	–4.18
Turnout		5,112	66.37	–8.96
Eligible voters		7,702		
United Farmers hold		Swing		–11.78
Source: Elections Ontario

1919 Ontario general election
Party	Candidate	Votes	%	±%
United Farmers	John Giles Lethbridge	4,394	75.59	–
Conservative	Donald Chisholm McKenzie	1,419	24.41	–13.29
Total valid votes		5,813	95.15	
Total rejected ballots		296	4.85	+4.85
Turnout		6,109	75.34	–14.57
Eligible voters		8,109		
United Farmers gain from Liberal		Swing		+6.64
Source: Elections Ontario

1914 Ontario general election
Party	Candidate	Votes	%	±%
Liberal	John Campbell Elliott	1,798	62.30	+2.44
Conservative	Neil A. Galbraith	1,088	37.70	–2.44
Total valid votes		2,886	100.00	
Total rejected ballots		–		
Turnout		2,886	89.91	+16.81
Eligible voters		3,210		
Liberal hold		Swing		+2.44
Source: Elections Ontario

1911 Ontario general election
Party	Candidate	Votes	%	±%
Liberal	John Campbell Elliott	1,767	59.86	–0.43
Conservative	Neil A. Galbraith	1,185	40.14	–
Total valid votes		2,952	99.70	
Total rejected ballots		9	0.30	–0.20
Turnout		2,961	73.09	–9.82
Eligible voters		4,051		
Liberal hold		Swing		–0.22
Source: Elections Ontario

1908 Ontario general election
Party	Candidate	Votes	%	±%
Liberal	John Campbell Elliott	1,775	60.29	+8.50
Independent Liberal	Alexander P. McDougald	1,169	39.71	–
Total valid votes		2,944	99.49	
Total rejected ballots		15	0.51	+0.51
Turnout		2,959	82.91	–
Eligible voters		3,569		
Liberal hold		Swing		+4.25
Source: Elections Ontario

Ontario provincial by-election, February 20, 1907 Resignation of George William Ross on being called to the Senate of Canada
Party	Candidate	Votes	%	±%
Liberal	Duncan Campbell Ross	2,024	51.79	+0.37
Conservative	George Stewart	1,884	48.21	–0.37
Total valid votes		3,908	100.00	
Total rejected ballots		–		
Turnout		3,908	–	–
Eligible voters				
Liberal hold		Swing		+0.37
Source: Elections Ontario

1905 Ontario general election
Party	Candidate	Votes	%	±%
Liberal	George William Ross	2,043	51.42	–6.65
Conservative	George A. Stewart	1,930	48.58	+6.65
Total valid votes		3,973	99.95	
Total rejected ballots		2	0.05	–0.88
Turnout		3,975	84.00	+10.69
Eligible voters		4,732		
Liberal hold		Swing		–6.65
Source: Elections Ontario

1902 Ontario general election
Party	Candidate	Votes	%	±%
Liberal	George William Ross	2,172	58.07	+6.35
Conservative	Thomas English	1,568	41.93	–6.35
Total valid votes		3,740	99.07	
Total rejected ballots		35	0.93	+0.63
Turnout		3,775	73.32	–11.47
Eligible voters		5,149		
Liberal hold		Swing		+6.35
Source: Elections Ontario

1898 Ontario general election
Party	Candidate	Votes	%	±%
Liberal	George William Ross	2,262	51.73	+0.26
Conservative	G. B. Campbell	2,111	48.27	–0.26
Total valid votes		4,373	99.70	
Total rejected ballots		13	0.30	–0.15
Turnout		4,386	84.79	+5.20
Eligible voters		5,173		
Liberal hold		Swing		+0.26
Source: Elections Ontario

1894 Ontario general election
Party	Candidate	Votes	%	±%
Liberal	George William Ross	1,970	51.46	–0.18
Conservative	John A. Leitch	1,858	48.54	+0.18
Total valid votes		3,828	99.56	
Total rejected ballots		17	0.44	–0.16
Turnout		3,845	79.59	–0.76
Eligible voters		4,831		
Liberal hold		Swing		–0.18
Source: Elections Ontario

1890 Ontario general election
Party	Candidate	Votes	%	±%
Liberal	George William Ross	1,950	51.64	–0.89
Conservative	John Morgan	1,826	48.36	+0.89
Total valid votes		3,776	99.39	
Total rejected ballots		23	0.61	+0.35
Turnout		3,799	80.35	+8.30
Eligible voters		4,728		
Liberal hold		Swing		–0.89
Source: Elections Ontario

1886 Ontario general election
Party	Candidate	Votes	%	±%
Liberal	George William Ross	2,021	52.53	+0.40
Conservative	R. Brown	1,826	47.47	–0.40
Total valid votes		3,847	99.74	
Total rejected ballots		10	0.26	+0.26
Turnout		3,857	72.05	–
Eligible voters		5,353		
Liberal hold		Swing		+0.40
Source: Elections Ontario

Ontario provincial by-election, December 14, 1883 Void election
Party	Candidate	Votes	%	±%
Liberal	George William Ross	1,918	52.13	+3.35
Conservative	Alexander Johnston	1,761	47.87	–3.35
Total valid votes		3,679	100.00	
Total rejected ballots		–		
Turnout		3,679	–	–
Eligible voters				
Liberal gain from Conservative		Swing		+3.35
Source: Elections Ontario

1883 Ontario general election
Party	Candidate	Votes	%	±%
Conservative	Alexander Johnston	1,835	51.21	+2.04
Liberal	John Watterworth	1,748	48.79	–2.04
Total valid votes		3,583	99.31	
Total rejected ballots		25	0.69	+0.69
Turnout		3,608	77.21	+7.41
Eligible voters		4,673		
Conservative gain from Liberal		Swing		+2.04
Source: Elections Ontario

1879 Ontario general election
Party	Candidate	Votes	%	±%
Liberal	John Watterworth	1,575	50.82	−3.47
Conservative	Mr. Richardson	1,524	49.18	+3.47
Total valid votes		3,099	69.80	−1.56
Eligible voters		4,440		
Liberal hold		Swing		−3.47
Source: Elections Ontario

1875 Ontario general election
Party	Candidate	Votes	%	±%
Liberal	John Watterworth	1,415	54.30	+2.36
Conservative	Nathaniel Currie	1,191	45.70	
Total valid votes		2,606	71.36	
Eligible voters		3,652		
Liberal hold		Swing		+2.36
Source: Elections Ontario

Ontario provincial by-election, September 1872 Resignation of Alexander Mackenzie
Party	Candidate	Votes	%
Liberal	John Watterworth	1,311	51.94
Independent	J.D. Dewan	1,213	48.06
Total valid votes		2,524	100.0
Liberal hold			
Source: History of the Electoral Districts, Legislatures and Ministries of the Province of Ontario

Ontario provincial by-election, January 1872 Ministerial by-election
Party	Candidate	Votes
Liberal	Alexander Mackenzie	Acclaimed
Source: History of the Electoral Districts, Legislatures and Ministries of the Province of Ontario

1871 Ontario general election
Party	Candidate	Votes	%	±%
Liberal	Alexander Mackenzie	1,362	58.81	+10.89
Conservative	Nathaniel Currie	954	41.19	−10.89
Turnout		2,316	77.17	−10.28
Eligible voters		3,001		
Liberal gain from Conservative		Swing		+10.89
Source: Elections Ontario

1867 Ontario general election
Party	Candidate	Votes	%
Conservative	Nathaniel Currie	1,100	52.08
Liberal	Mr. Campbell	1,012	47.92
Total valid votes		2,112	87.45
Eligible voters		2,415	
Conservative pickup new district.			
Source: Elections Ontario
