= Donald Mackenzie Cameron =

Canadian politician

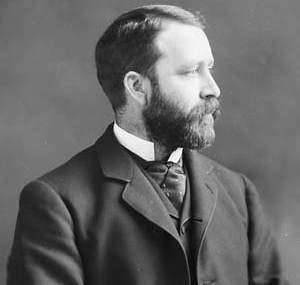
Donald Mackenzie Cameron Source: Library and Archives Canada

Donald Mackenzie Cameron (November 11, 1843 – May 12, 1936) was a Scottish-born merchant, journalist and political figure in Ontario, Canada. He represented Middlesex West in the House of Commons of Canada from 1883 to 1887 as a Liberal member.

Cameron was born in Dingwall and was educated in Edinburgh and London, Ontario, having come to Canada in 1859. In 1879, he married Victoria Wilson Gooderham. He worked with the London Prototype and the Toronto Globe. Cameron served as deputy reeve in 1879 and reeve from 1881 to 1883 for Strathroy and was warden for Middlesex County in 1883. He was also a member of the local school board. Cameron was elected in an 1883 by-election held after the election of George William Ross was declared invalid. He was defeated by William Frederick Roome when he ran for reelection in 1887.

Donald Mackenzie Cameron's Great-Great grandson Brian Cameron, born in Ottawa, Ontario ran as a Liberal for the seat of Courtenay-Alberni in the election of 2025.
