= Lloyd William Morgan Freele =

Canadian politician from Ontario

Member of the Ontario Provincial Parliament for Middlesex West
- In office September 30, 1929 – April 3, 1934
- Preceded by: John Giles Lethbridge
- Succeeded by: constituency abolished

Personal details
- Party: Conservative

Lloyd William Morgan Freele was a Canadian politician from the Conservative Party of Ontario. He represented Middlesex West in the Legislative Assembly of Ontario from 1929 to 1934.

== See also ==
- 18th Parliament of Ontario
