= Alexander Johnston (Ontario politician) =

Canadian politician

Member of the Ontario Provincial Parliament for Middlesex West
- In office February 27, 1883 – November 15, 1883
- Preceded by: John Watterworth
- Succeeded by: George William Ross

Personal details
- Party: Conservative

Alexander Johnston was a Canadian politician from Ontario. He represented Middlesex West in the Legislative Assembly of Ontario in 1883 before he was unseated on appeal.

== See also ==
- 5th Parliament of Ontario
