= William Frederick Roome =

Canadian politician

William Frederick Roome (November 21, 1841 – September 1, 1921) was a physician and political figure in Ontario, Canada. He represented Middlesex West in the House of Commons of Canada from 1887 to 1896 as a Conservative member.

He was born in Oxford Township, Canada West. Roome received an M.D. from the University of Michigan. In 1869, he married Maggie Anderson. He served as a member of the council for Newbury and as chairman of the school board. Roome was defeated by Donald Mackenzie Cameron in an 1883 by-election. He defeated Cameron in the 1887 federal election; that election was appealed but he won the by-election which followed in 1888. He served until 1896, when he was defeated by William Samuel Calvert.
