= John Watterworth =

Canadian politician

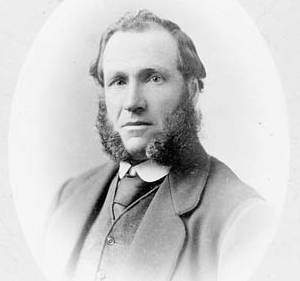

Ontario MPP
- In office 1872–1883
- Preceded by: Alexander Mackenzie
- Succeeded by: Alexander Johnston
- Constituency: Middlesex West

Personal details
- Born: November 24, 1827 Elgin County, Ontario
- Died: March 1, 1903 (aged 75)
- Party: Liberal

John Watterworth (November 24, 1827 – March 1, 1903) was an Ontario political figure. He represented Middlesex West in the Legislative Assembly of Ontario as a Liberal member from 1872 to 1883.

He was born in Elgin County, Ontario. He served as reeve of Mosa Township and warden for Middlesex County. He was elected to the provincial legislature in an 1872 by-election when the sitting member resigned to retain his seat in the federal parliament.

== Electoral history ==
Ontario provincial by-election, September 1872: Middlesex West Resignation of Alexander Mackenzie
Party	Candidate	Votes	%
Liberal	John Watterworth	1,311	51.94
Independent	J.D. Dewan	1,213	48.06
Total valid votes		2,524	100.0
Liberal hold			
Source: History of the Electoral Districts, Legislatures and Ministries of the Province of Ontario

1875 Ontario general election: Middlesex West
Party	Candidate	Votes	%	±%
Liberal	John Watterworth	1,415	54.30	+2.36
Conservative	Nathaniel Currie	1,191	45.70	
Total valid votes		2,606	71.36	
Eligible voters		3,652		
Liberal hold		Swing		+2.36
Source: Elections Ontario

1879 Ontario general election: Middlesex West
Party	Candidate	Votes	%	±%
Liberal	John Watterworth	1,575	50.82	−3.47
Conservative	Mr. Richardson	1,524	49.18	+3.47
Total valid votes		3,099	69.80	−1.56
Eligible voters		4,440		
Liberal hold		Swing		−3.47
Source: Elections Ontario
