= Duncan Campbell Ross =

Canadian politician

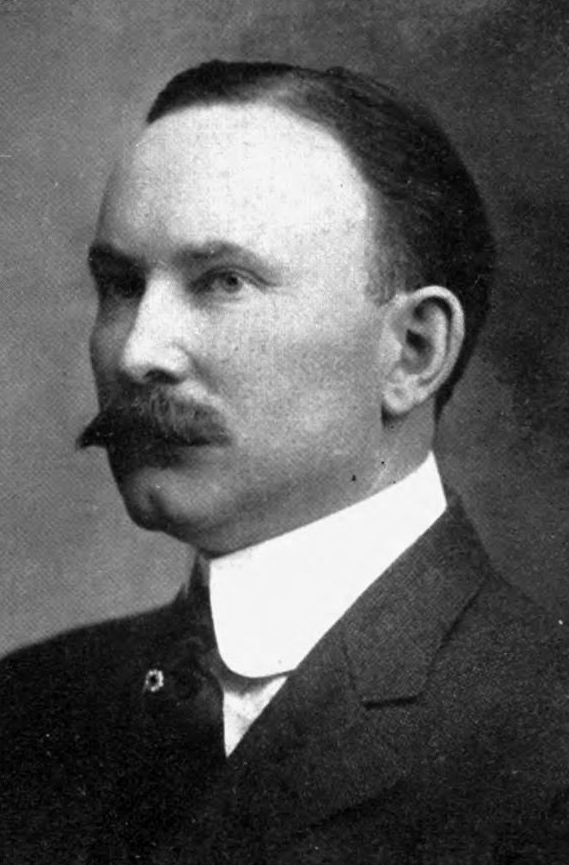

Member of Parliament for Middlesex West
- In office 1909–1921
- Preceded by: William Samuel Calvert
- Succeeded by: John Douglas Fraser Drummond

Ontario MPP
- In office 1908–1909
- Preceded by: Charles Constantine Hodgins
- Succeeded by: James William Doyle
- Constituency: Middlesex North
- In office 1907–1908
- Preceded by: George William Ross
- Succeeded by: John Campbell Elliott
- Constituency: Middlesex West

Personal details
- Born: 16 December 1871 Strathroy, Ontario, Canada
- Died: 10 January 1961 (aged 89)
- Party: Liberal
- Other political affiliations: Ontario Liberal Party
- Relations: George William Ross, father

Duncan Campbell Ross (16 December 1871 – 10 January 1961) was a Canadian lawyer and Liberal politician. He sat in the Legislative Assembly of Ontario representing Middlesex West from 1907 to 1908 and Middlesex North from 1908 to 1909.

He represented Middlesex West in the House of Commons from 1909 to 1921. During the Conscription Crisis of 1917, Ross remained loyal to the anti-conscription (and largely francophone) Laurier Liberals, and was one of only 8 members of the faction to be elected from Ontario in that year's election.

He is the son of Sir George William Ross who was Premier of Ontario from 1899 to 1905.
