= William Howell Arthur Thomas =

Canadian politician (1895–1979)

- Official 1966 portrait

Member of Parliament for Middlesex West
- In office June 1957 – April 1968

Personal details
- Born: 27 February 1895 Caradoc Township, Ontario, Canada
- Died: 22 March 1979 (aged 84) London, Ontario, Canada
- Party: Progressive Conservative
- Profession: educator, farmer

William Howell Arthur Thomas (27 February 1895 – 22 March 1979) was a Progressive Conservative party member of the House of Commons of Canada. He was born in Caradoc Township, Ontario and became an educator and farmer by career.

He was first elected at the Middlesex West riding in the 1957 general election then re-elected there in 1958, 1962, 1963 and 1965. After completing his final term, the 27th Canadian Parliament, Thomas left federal politics and did not seek re-election in 1968.
