= Angus Peter McDonald =

Canadian politician

Angus Peter McDonald (1813 – January 22, 1889) was a contractor and political figure in Ontario. He represented Middlesex West in the 1st Canadian Parliament as a Conservative Party member.

Born in Canada, he lived in Glencoe, Ontario. McDonald was elected to represent the West riding of Middlesex in the Legislative Assembly of the Province of Canada in an 1858 by-election held following the death of John Scatcherd, serving until 1861, when he ran unsuccessfully for reelection. McDonald died in Toronto at the age of 76.
