= Middlesex West (federal electoral district) =

Former federal electoral district in Ontario, Canada

Ontario electoral district

Defunct federal electoral district
- Legislature: House of Commons
- District created: 1867
- District abolished: 1966
- First contested: 1867
- Last contested: 1965

Middlesex West was a federal electoral district represented in the House of Commons of Canada from 1867 to 1968. It was located in the province of Ontario. It was created by the British North America Act 1867 which divided the County of Middlesex into three ridings: Middlesex North (federal electoral district), Middlesex West and Middlesex East.

The West Riding initially consisted of the Townships of Delaware, Caradoc, Metcalfe, Mosa and Ekfrid, and the Village of Strathroy.

In 1882, it was redefined to include the townships of Adelaide, Euphemia, the villages of Glencoe, Newbury and Wardsville, and to exclude the township of Carradoc.

In 1903, it was redefined to consist of the townships of Caradoc, Delaware, Ekfrid, Metcalfe and Mosa, the town of Strathroy, and the villages of Glencoe, Newbury and Wardsville.

In 1914, it was redefined to consist of the townships of Adelaide, Lobo, Delaware, Caradoc, Metcalfe, Mosa, Ekfrid, McGillivray, Williams East and Williams West, the towns of Park Hill and Strathroy, and the villages of Ailsa Craig, Glencoe, Newbury and Wardsville.

In 1924, it was defined as consisting of the part of the county of Middlesex lying west of and including the townships of McGillivray, Williams East, Lobo and Delaware.

In 1947, it was redefined to consist of the county of Middlesex, excluding the townships of North Dorchester, London, West Nissouri and Westminster.

In 1952, it was redefined to consist of the county of Middlesex excluding the townships of North Dorchester, London, West Nissouri, Westminster, and the eastern part of the township of London.

The electoral district was abolished in 1966 when it was redistributed between Huron, London West and Middlesex ridings.

== Members of Parliament ==
This riding elected the following members of the House of Commons of Canada:

| Parliament | Years | Member | Party |
|---|---|---|---|
| 1st | 1867–1872 | Angus Peter McDonald | Conservative |
| 2nd | 1872–1874 | George William Ross | Liberal |
| 3rd | 1874–1878 | George William Ross | Liberal |
| 4th | 1878–1882 | George William Ross | Liberal |
| 5th | 1882–1883 | George William Ross | Liberal |
| 5th | 1883–1887 | Donald Mackenzie Cameron | Liberal |
| 6th | 1887–1888 | William Frederick Roome | Conservative |
| 6th | 1888–1891 | William Frederick Roome | Conservative |
| 7th | 1891–1896 | William Frederick Roome | Conservative |
| 8th | 1896–1900 | William Samuel Calvert | Liberal |
| 9th | 1900–1904 | William Samuel Calvert | Liberal |
| 10th | 1904–1908 | William Samuel Calvert | Liberal |
| 11th | 1908–1909 | William Samuel Calvert | Liberal |
| 11th | 1909–1911 | Duncan Campbell Ross | Liberal |
| 12th | 1911–1917 | Duncan Campbell Ross | Liberal |
| 13th | 1917–1921 | Duncan Campbell Ross | Opposition (Laurier Liberals) |
| 14th | 1921–1925 | John Douglas Fraser Drummond | Progressive |
| 15th | 1925–1926 | John Campbell Elliott | Liberal |
| 15th | 1926–1926 | John Campbell Elliott | Liberal |
| 16th | 1926–1926 | John Campbell Elliott | Liberal |
| 16th | 1926–1930 | John Campbell Elliott | Liberal |
| 17th | 1930–1935 | John Campbell Elliott | Liberal |
| 18th | 1935–1940 | John Campbell Elliott | Liberal |
| 19th | 1940–1945 | Robert McCubbin | Liberal |
| 20th | 1945–1949 | Robert McCubbin | Liberal |
| 21st | 1949–1953 | Robert McCubbin | Liberal |
| 22nd | 1953–1957 | Robert McCubbin | Liberal |
| 23rd | 1957–1958 | William Howell Arthur Thomas | Progressive Conservative |
| 24th | 1958–1962 | William Howell Arthur Thomas | Progressive Conservative |
| 25th | 1962–1963 | William Howell Arthur Thomas | Progressive Conservative |
| 26th | 1963–1965 | William Howell Arthur Thomas | Progressive Conservative |
| 27th | 1965–1968 | William Howell Arthur Thomas | Progressive Conservative |
Riding dissolved into Huron, London West and Middlesex

== Election results ==
1867 Canadian federal election
| Party | Candidate | Votes |
|---|---|---|
| Conservative | Angus Peter McDonald | 1,063 |
| Unknown | G. Billington | 1,044 |

1872 Canadian federal election
| Party | Candidate | Votes |
|---|---|---|
| Liberal | George William Ross | 1,322 |
| Conservative | Angus Peter McDonald | 1,266 |
| Unknown | G. Billington | 7 |

1874 Canadian federal election
| Party | Candidate | Votes |
|---|---|---|
| Liberal | George William Ross | acclaimed |

1878 Canadian federal election
| Party | Candidate | Votes |
|---|---|---|
| Liberal | George William Ross | 1,635 |
| Unknown | N. Currie | 1,587 |

1882 Canadian federal election
| Party | Candidate | Votes |
|---|---|---|
| Liberal | George William Ross | 1,651 |
| Unknown | A. Currie | 1,597 |

On election being declared void, October 1883:

By-election on 14 December 1883
| Party | Candidate | Votes |
| Liberal | Donald Mackenzie Cameron | 1,771 |
| Conservative | William Frederick Roome | 1,739 |

1887 Canadian federal election
| Party | Candidate | Votes |
|---|---|---|
| Conservative | William Frederick Roome | 2,110 |
| Liberal | Donald Mackenzie Cameron | 2,005 |

On Mr. Roome being unseated on petition:

By-election on 10 March 1888
| Party | Candidate | Votes |
| Conservative | William Frederick Roome | 1,940 |
| Unknown | ? Elliott | 1,828 |

1891 Canadian federal election
| Party | Candidate | Votes |
|---|---|---|
| Conservative | William Frederick Roome | 1,529 |
| Liberal | Hector McFarlane | 1,119 |
| Conservative | William Brock | 1,110 |

1896 Canadian federal election
| Party | Candidate | Votes |
|---|---|---|
| Liberal | William Samuel Calvert | 2,274 |
| Conservative | William Frederick Roome | 1,933 |

1900 Canadian federal election
| Party | Candidate | Votes |
|---|---|---|
| Liberal | William Samuel Calvert | 1,989 |
| Conservative | Richard Dunlop | 1,813 |

1904 Canadian federal election
| Party | Candidate | Votes |
|---|---|---|
| Liberal | William Samuel Calvert | 1,996 |
| Conservative | George A. Stewart | 1,790 |

1908 Canadian federal election
| Party | Candidate | Votes |
|---|---|---|
| Liberal | William Samuel Calvert | 1,856 |
| Conservative | Robert McLauchlin | 1,844 |

On Mr. Calvert being appointed member of the National Transcontinental Railway Commission, 21 October 1909:

By-election on 10 November 1909
| Party | Candidate | Votes |
| Liberal | Duncan Campbell Ross | 1,934 |
| Conservative | Robert McLauchlin | 1,778 |

1911 Canadian federal election
| Party | Candidate | Votes |
|---|---|---|
| Liberal | Duncan Campbell Ross | 1,883 |
| Conservative | James Cobban | 1,752 |

1917 Canadian federal election
| Party | Candidate | Votes |
|---|---|---|
| Opposition (Laurier Liberals) | Duncan Campbell Ross | 3,930 |
| Government (Unionist) | George Adam Elliot | 3,531 |

1921 Canadian federal election
| Party | Candidate | Votes |
|---|---|---|
| Progressive | John Douglas Fraser Drummond | 5,543 |
| Liberal | Duncan Campbell Ross | 4,004 |
| Conservative | George Adam Elliot | 2,445 |

1925 Canadian federal election
| Party | Candidate | Votes |
|---|---|---|
| Liberal | John Campbell Elliott | 4,926 |
| Progressive | Allan L. McDougall | 3,548 |
| Conservative | Thomas Elliott | 2,816 |

On Mr. Elliott being appointed Minister of Labour, 8 March 1926:

By-election on 29 March 1926
| Party | Candidate | Votes |
| Liberal | John Campbell Elliott | 6,443 |
| Unknown | Thomas Elliot | 3,783 |

1926 Canadian federal election
| Party | Candidate | Votes |
|---|---|---|
| Liberal | John Campbell Elliott | 6,187 |
| Conservative | Alfred Edwin Aldred | 4,086 |

On Mr. Elliott being appointed Minister of Public Works, 25 October 1926:

By-election on 2 November 1926
| Party | Candidate | Votes |
| Liberal | John Campbell Elliott | acclaimed |

1930 Canadian federal election
| Party | Candidate | Votes |
|---|---|---|
| Liberal | John Campbell Elliott | 6,329 |
| Conservative | Peter Henry Campbell | 4,839 |

1935 Canadian federal election
| Party | Candidate | Votes |
|---|---|---|
| Liberal | John Campbell Elliott | 6,369 |
| Conservative | Lloyd W. M. Freele | 3,382 |
| Reconstruction | John Edward Campbell | 1,920 |

1940 Canadian federal election
| Party | Candidate | Votes |
|---|---|---|
| Liberal | Robert McCubbin | 6,024 |
| National Government | Lloyd William M. Freele | 3,886 |

1945 Canadian federal election
| Party | Candidate | Votes |
|---|---|---|
| Liberal | Robert McCubbin | 6,690 |
| Progressive Conservative | Archibald Pedden | 4,303 |
| Co-operative Commonwealth | Allen Coghill | 458 |

1949 Canadian federal election
| Party | Candidate | Votes |
|---|---|---|
| Liberal | Robert McCubbin | 7,938 |
| Progressive Conservative | James George Little | 5,239 |

1953 Canadian federal election
| Party | Candidate | Votes |
|---|---|---|
| Liberal | Robert McCubbin | 8,645 |
| Progressive Conservative | Cameron Hugh McTaggart | 5,760 |
| Co-operative Commonwealth | Ross McEwen Pope | 432 |

1957 Canadian federal election
| Party | Candidate | Votes |
|---|---|---|
| Progressive Conservative | William Howell Arthur Thomas | 9,075 |
| Liberal | Robert McCubbin | 7,368 |
| Co-operative Commonwealth | Jack McLachlen | 631 |

1958 Canadian federal election
| Party | Candidate | Votes |
|---|---|---|
| Progressive Conservative | William Howell Arthur Thomas | 11,974 |
| Liberal | Harvey Wales | 5,883 |

1962 Canadian federal election
| Party | Candidate | Votes |
|---|---|---|
| Progressive Conservative | William Howell Arthur Thomas | 10,178 |
| Liberal | David McDonald | 7,914 |
| New Democratic | Arthur B. Stewart | 1,658 |
| Social Credit | Lloyd H. Alford | 327 |

1963 Canadian federal election
| Party | Candidate | Votes |
|---|---|---|
| Progressive Conservative | William Howell Arthur Thomas | 10,247 |
| Liberal | George A. McKenzie | 9,320 |
| New Democratic | Arthur B. Stewart | 1,327 |
| Social Credit | James A. Watson | 232 |

1965 Canadian federal election
| Party | Candidate | Votes |
|---|---|---|
| Progressive Conservative | William Howell Arthur Thomas | 9,768 |
| Liberal | Norman W. Hodgins | 9,405 |
| New Democratic | Pat Chefurka | 2,067 |

== See also ==
- List of Canadian electoral districts
- Historical federal electoral districts of Canada
