= Fingal, Ontario =

Community in Ontario, Canada

Coordinates: 42.717°N 81.300°W

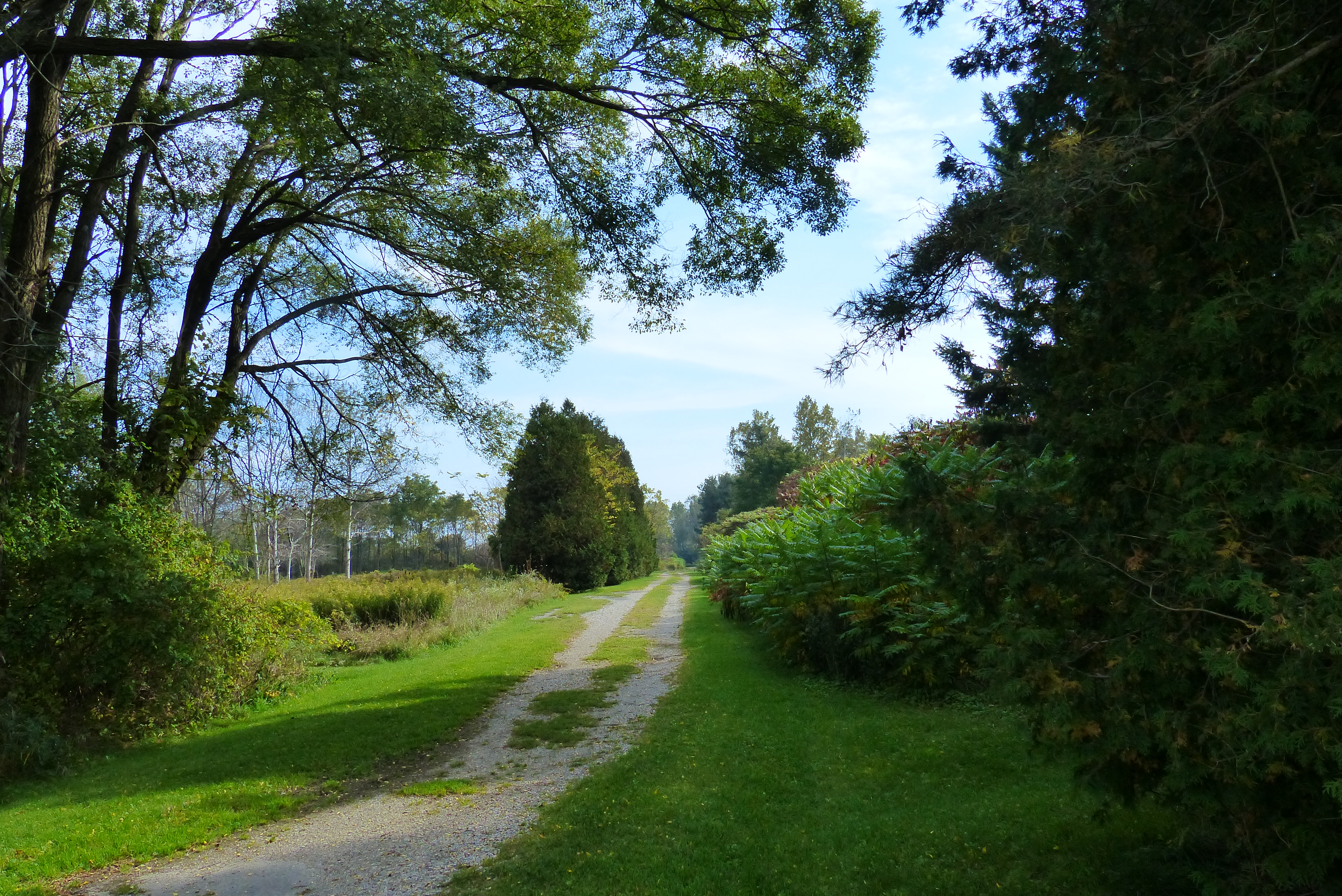

Fingal is a small community near the north shore of Lake Erie 12 km southwest of St. Thomas, Ontario, located within the township of Southwold in Elgin County. Located in Fingal is the historic RCAF Station Fingal, which was a major centre for air force training during World War II. Now named the Fingal Wildlife Management Area its 724 acres are now a protected natural area. The Southwold Township office and the Fingal Presbyterian Church are also located in Fingal, as well as the local businesses; Stan's Total Tire, Summit Food Distribution, Fingal Farm Supply Ltd and Advantage Farm Equipment. Fingal, Ontario is well known for its world-class Holstein breeding programs.

The community was named for Fingal, a county formed from within County Dublin in Ireland.

== See also ==
- List of communities in Ontario
