= John Campbell Elliott =

Canadian politician

The Honourable John Campbell Elliott
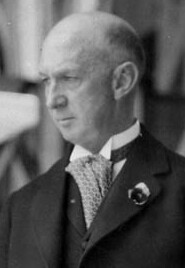
- Elliott in 1927

Canadian Senator from Ontario
- In office 1940–1941
- Appointed by: William Lyon Mackenzie King

Member of Parliament for Middlesex West
- In office 1925–1940
- Preceded by: John Alexander Stewart
- Succeeded by: William Samuel Murphy

Ontario MPP
- In office 1908–1919
- Preceded by: Duncan Campbell Ross
- Succeeded by: John Giles Lethbridge
- Constituency: Middlesex West

Personal details
- Born: 25 August 1872 Ekfrid, Ontario, Canada
- Died: 20 December 1941 (aged 69) Ottawa, Ontario, Canada
- Party: Liberal
- Education: Trinity College, Toronto; Osgoode Hall Law School
- Occupation: Lawyer

John Campbell Elliott, PC (25 August 1872 – 20 December 1941) was a Canadian lawyer and politician.

== Early life ==
He was born in Ekfrid, Ontario, the son of George Elliott and Jane Campbell. He was educated at the University of Trinity College in the University of Toronto, studied law at Osgoode Hall and was called to the bar in 1896.

== Career ==
J. C. Elliott was first elected to the Legislative Assembly of Ontario in 1908 as the Member of the Legislative Assembly (MLA) for the London, Ontario area riding of Middlesex West and a member of the Ontario Liberal Party. The Liberals were out of government for the entire time Elliott was an MLA. In 1919, he ran in the first Ontario Liberal Party leadership convention, coming in a poor third, and left provincial politics shortly afterwards.

Elliott moved to federal politics a few years later winning a seat in the House of Commons of Canada in the 1925 federal election as the Liberal Member of Parliament (MP) for the riding of Middlesex West. In March 1926, he was appointed to the Canadian Cabinet by William Lyon Mackenzie King as Minister of Labour. In September of that year, he was moved to the position of Minister of Public Works, and remained in that portfolio until the Liberal government's defeat in the 1930 election.

Elliott was personally re-elected and sat on the Opposition benches until the Liberals returned to power in the 1935 election. Elliott was returned to Cabinet, this time as Postmaster-General. In 1940, he was appointed to the Senate of Canada where he sat until his death the next year.

== Personal life ==
J.C. Elliott was a member of a Baptist church, never married and had no issue. Elliott was a District Deputy in the Masonic Order.
