= John Elliott Theatre =

Coordinates: 43.648348°N 79.925662°W

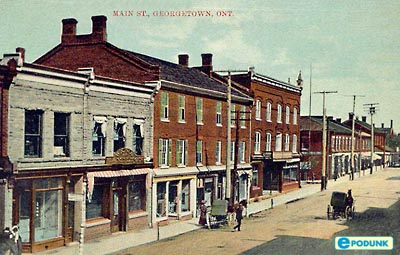
Georgetown’s Main Street as it would have looked around the time when the church was built

The John Elliott Theatre is a playhouse located in Georgetown, Ontario, Canada, housing the Georgetown Little Theatre and Georgetown Globe Productions and hosting community groups, entertainers, and businesses. The theatre space is part of a church building built in 1854, which was given to the town to serve as a library in 1915.

== Overview ==
The John Elliott Theatre shares a building with the Halton Hills Public Library. The theatre features a wide proscenium, sizable stage, orchestra pit, and 260 seats, its space having expanded after the library moved into a new wing in 1973. It is named after John Alwyn Elliott (1923-1978).

Together with the art gallery that also shares the building, this space is referred to as the Halton Hills Cultural Centre and is operated by the Recreation and Parks Department. This centre is funded by the city and ticket fees, and current supervisor of this centre is Jamie Smith.

Today, the theatre shows plays, artistic performances, and films. For the 2018/19 season, the box office listed five plays (three mainstage and two youth productions), two musical performances, and various films, including works by local playwrights.

The Georgetown Little Theatre housed in this space produces plays in various categories, including a showcase of new works.
