= Georgetown Little Theatre =

Award-winning theatre group based in Georgetown

Georgetown Little Theatre is a THEA Award-winning community theatre group based in Georgetown, Ontario. Formed in 1960, it is one of the oldest continuously existing community theaters in Canada.

Their first performance was Bill Johnson's Dirty Work at the Crossroads on February 24, 1961. The theatre group has performed regularly at the John Elliott Theatre since the building's 1981 opening.
