= Frederick Wase =

Canadian Anglican priest

Frederick Homer Wase was a Canadian Anglican priest in the 20th Century.

Wase was ordained in 1924. After a curacy at Christ's Church Cathedral, Hamilton, Ontario he held incumbencies at Glen Williams, Guelph. and Dunnville. He was Archdeacon of Haldimand and Wentworth from 1955 to 1960.
