= Acton, Ontario =

Acton
- Unincorporated community
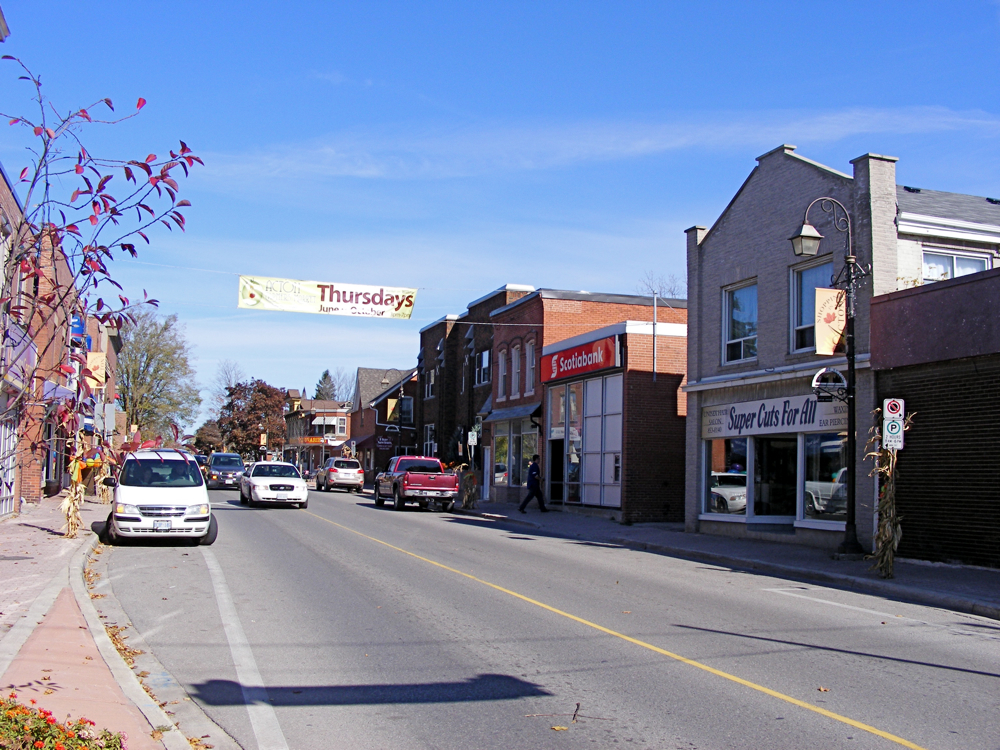
- Mill Street in Acton

- Location within Regional Municipality of Halton Location within Southern Ontario
- Coordinates: 43°37′53″N 80°2′20″W
- Country: Canada
- Province: Ontario
- Region: Halton
- Town: Halton Hills
- Founded: 1828
- Incorporated (village): 1874
- Erected (town): 1950
- Amalgamated: 1974
- Elevation: 350 m (1,150 ft)

Population (2021)
  - Total: 9,377
- Time zone: UTC−05:00 (EST)
  - Summer (DST): UTC−04:00 (EDT)
- Forward sortation area: L7J
- Area codes: 519, 226, 548
- Highways: Highway 7 Former Highway 25
- NTS Map: 40P9 Guelph

Acton is an unincorporated community located within the town of Halton Hills, in Halton Region, Ontario, Canada. At the northern end of the Region, it is on the outer edge of the Greater Toronto Area and is one of two of the primary population centres of the Town; the other is Georgetown. From 1842 until 1986, the town was a major centre for the tanning and leather goods industry. In the early years, it was often referred to as "Leathertown". In 2021, it had a population 9,376.

== History ==
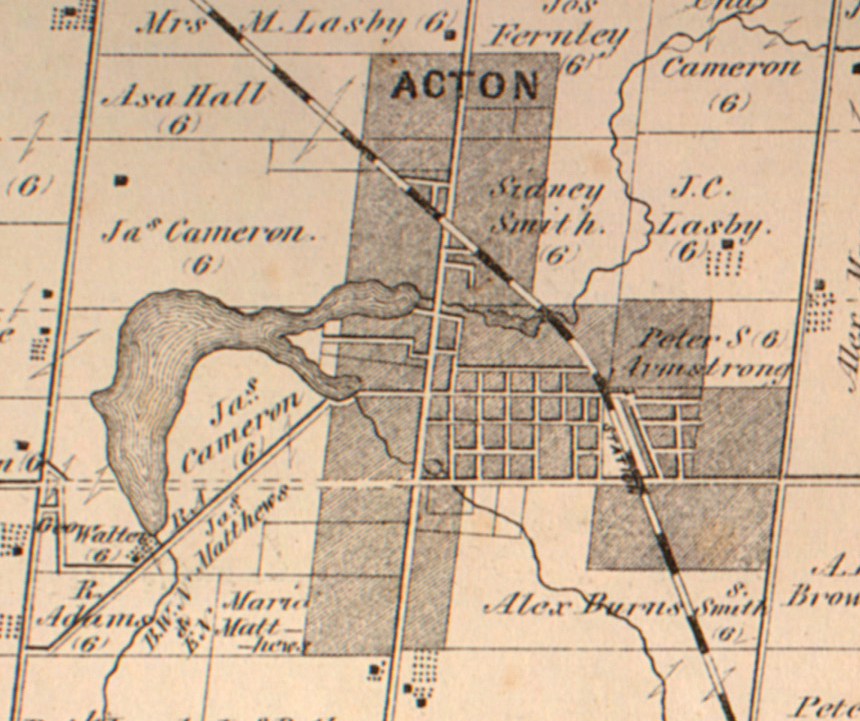
Village limits of Acton in 1877

In 1825, the area now known as Acton was settled by the Rev. Ezra, Rev. Zenas, and Rufus Adams. These men were Methodist preachers who took a sabbatical and began farming here on a branch of the Credit River. A fourth brother, Eliphalet, also settled here later. In the 1840s, the community had a grist mill and tannery. The community was initially named Danville when settler Wheeler Green opened a dry-goods store in 1828. It was later called Adamsville, after the three original settlers. In 1844, postmaster Robert Swan named the village Acton after the area of Acton, London, in England.

When the Mississaugas still had their reserve at Port Credit in the 19th century, they would come up to Acton every spring to tap the sugar bush just south of the village.

In 1856, the Grand Trunk Railway arrived and helped spur growth in the area, especially along Mill Street. By 1869, Acton had businesses that included woodworking mills, tanneries, glove makers and carriage works. Originally part of Esquesing Township, Acton's principal trade was in grain, lumber, cordwood, leather and hops.

A local newspaper, The Acton Free Press, was established in the village in 1875. It continued to publish until its closure in 1984.

=== Evolution ===
Under a bylaw passed by the Halton County Council in September 1873, it was incorporated as a village in 1874, and erected into a town in 1950. A new town hall was opened in 1883 (later designated as a Heritage Building in 1996).

Since its formation, the boundaries were expanded in several stages over the years prior to its amalgamation in 1974:

- The first effort was in 1918, when an application was made to annex 25.7 acres (0.1 km^{2}) of parkland and housing lots adjoining Fairy Lake, along with 77.3 acres (0.3 km^{2}) consting of the Crescent subdivision and the lands occupied by the Acton Tanning Company. Only the first parcel of land was approved for annexation, but it helped to resolve some anomalies among the affected properties.
- The Crescent subdivision was annexed at the beginning of 1949.
- In March 1955, the new Town increased in size from 514 acres (2.1 km^{2}) to 979 acres (4.0 km^{2}), through the annexation of the industrial lands occupied by Beardmore and the Wool Combing Corporation, together with farmland that would later be developed into the Glenlea and Lakeview subdivisions.
- 87.45 acres (0.4 km^{2}) of industrial land north of the Town limits was annexed in September 1958.
- 69.79 acres (0.3 km^{2}) of land to the south and west of the Fairview Cemetery, and south of Cobble Hill Road (then known as Queen Street), was annexed in 1968 for residential development.

=== Leather industry ===
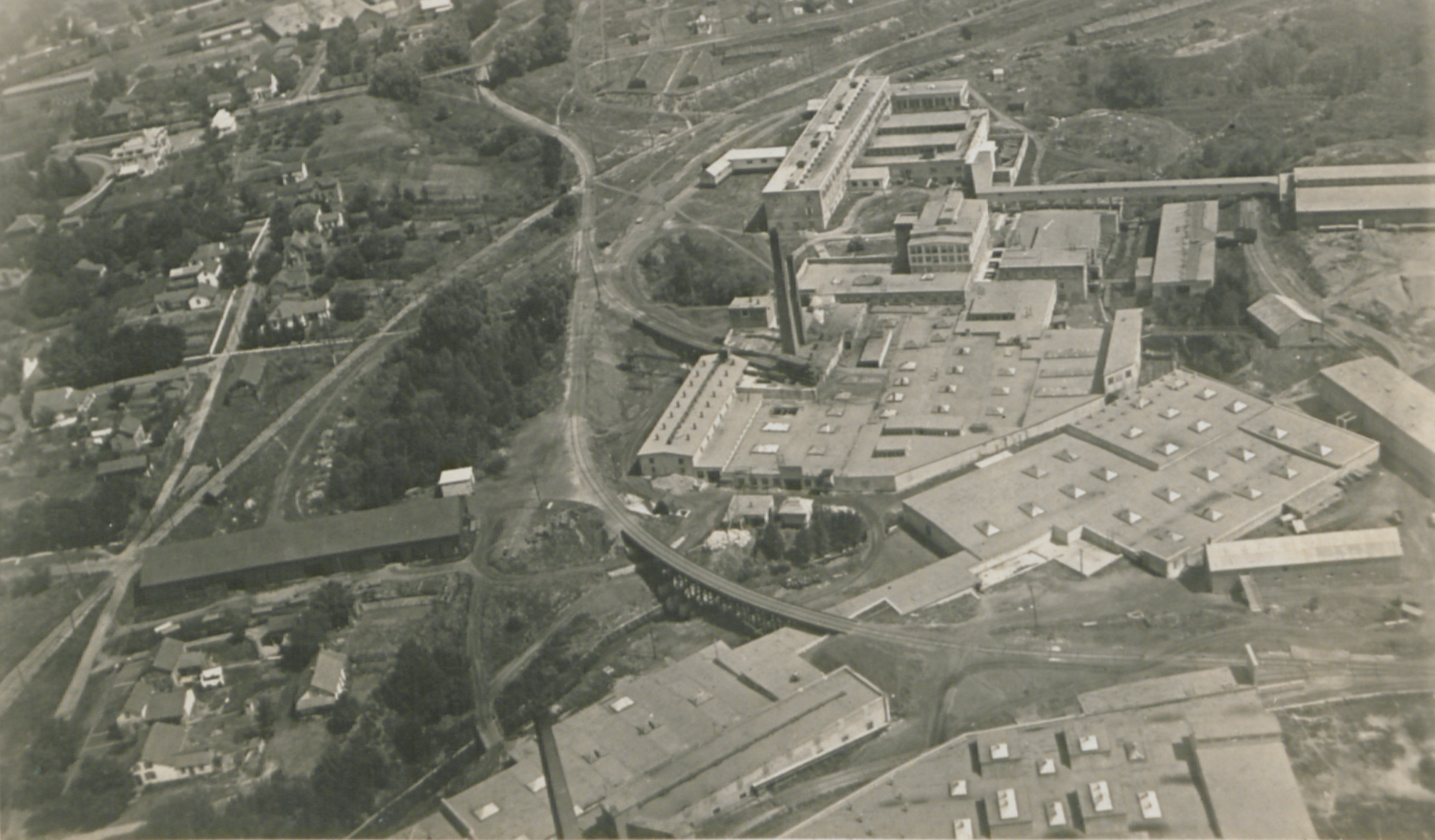
Beardmore and Company tannery in 1919, viewed in the air from the west. Grand Trunk spur line is coming in from the east, intersecting with the Toronto Suburban Railway line curving from south to west. Agnes Street is the east–west road at the left of the picture.

Tanning has been an important industry in Acton since 1842, when the first tannery was established by Abraham Nelles, as the area was attractive to the leather industry because of the large numbers of hemlock and spruce trees. These provided the tannin required for a firm, high quality leather of a reddish colour.

A number of subsequent owners operated the tannery business, before the Beardmore family purchased it in 1865, running it for over 50 years. At one time, it was the largest tanner in Canada.

The Beardmores also opened tanneries in other parts of southern Ontario. From 1877 to 1922, they operated another large facility in Bracebridge, having been attracted by the area's large supply of hemlock. It closed due to the decline of American markets around 1920.

By 1889, their main tanneries in Acton were very large, with a combined floor space of almost 1,000,000 square feet (93,000 m^{2}). They also built a large brick warehouse that year beside the railway tracks. Hides arrived by rail and were taken for processing by horse-drawn wagons and then shipped by rail to customers.

The Beardmore tannery was successfully sued for wrongful death in 1899, after an employee died in 1897 from anthrax poisoning arising from the handling of infected hides.

In 1944, the tannery was sold to Canada Packers who ran it until its closure in 1986.

In March 1946, a breach in the tannery's filter dam lead to the release of 25,000,000 imperial gallons (110,000 m^{3}) of waste water and debris, which flooded the village water supply and caused extensive property damage downstream as far as Limehouse and Stewarttown.

In 1980, three investors decided to transform the tannery's warehouse into the Old Hide House, a retail store with leather clothing, goods and furniture. From 1980 to 1993, the Old Hide House also housed a restaurant, Jack Tanner's Table. It was famous for its commercial slogan, "It's worth the drive to Acton!" The business was interrupted at times because of bankruptcy and other reasons, and was finally closed in late 2024.

Other specialty tanners and leather products manufacturers were also established in the town. These included Hewetson Shoe, Coronna Shoe, Superior Glove, Marzo Glove and Frank Heller and Co. In the early 20th century, Acton was the main urban community of Esquesing Township, much larger than nearby Georgetown, Ontario which now has four times the population.

Because of the extensive tanning industry that was located in the area during the 19th century and early 20th century, the area has earned the nickname of Leathertown.

=== Passenger transport ===
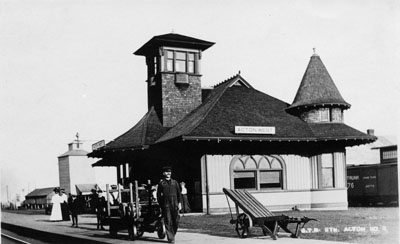
The former Acton train station

GO Transit provides bus and train service on its Kitchener corridor, with a stop at Acton GO Station.

The Grand Trunk brought trains to the area in 1856, and its station was next to the Beardmore leather warehouse. Canadian National closed the station in November 1967, (although the agent would stay until 1968) and later applied to formally cease service, which was not heard by the Canadian Transport Commission until January 1970. The Commission refused the application in October 1970, ordering the then minimal operation to continue. CN, together with Gray Coach Lines, would later add an additional train/bus line in April 1971. While the service remained, the station was disposed in 1973 and replaced with a shelter for the GO Bus service between Guelph and Toronto. CN would cease picking up area passengers in November 1975.

GO Trains would begin stopping in Acton in October 1990, but were later suspended in July 1993 because of budget cuts. The service later resumed in January 2013.

Bus service first appeared in April 1926, when Toronto, Kitchener and London Coach Lines began operating a route between Kitchener and Toronto. Following TKL's bankruptcy in January 1927, the route was taken over by Arrow Coach Lines.

Arrow was acquired by Gray Coach in May 1937, which continued to operate buses through Acton until GO Transit took over in February 1976.

From 1917 to 1931, Acton was also served by the Toronto Suburban Railway, which early on entered into a notable dispute with the Beardmore tannery over a crossing with a Grand Trunk spur line in the town, that went all the way to the Supreme Court of Canada for resolution.

=== Identity ===
==== Permission to use arms ====
In 1926, with the help of Sir Harry Brittain, the Village of Acton was given permission by the Municipal Borough of Acton in Middlesex, England, to adopt a variant of the latter's coat of arms.

The arms were more particularly described as follows (substituting "Canadian sugar maple" for "oak", as the case may be):

- ARMS: Gules an Oak Tree issuant from a Mount in base proper on a Chief Or between to the dexter an open Book and the sinister a Cog-Wheel both proper a Pale of the first charged with three Seaxes fessewise in pale proper pommelled and hilted Or points to the sinister and cutting edge upwards in chief a Saxon Crown of the last.
- CREST: Issuant from a Mural Crown Or a Sprig of Oak fructed proper.
- MOTTO: Floreat Actona - Latin: May Acton flourish.

The municipal council continued to use it until 1974, when Acton amalgamated with the Town of Georgetown and most of the Township of Esquesing to form the Town of Halton Hills.

==== Actonite or Actonian ====
In older books and papers of the area, two demonyms have existed for residents of the area at the same time. Actonite was used to identify people who moved to the area, and Actonian referred to people who grew up there. The first designation now predominates, due to the influx of new residents in the 1960s, but older residents still remember it.

== Geography ==
Acton is located at the intersection of Highway 7 and Regional Road 25.

The town's location was chosen because of the good source of water power from the Black Creek, and the flour mill established at the beginning is still in operation today, as part of Parrish & Heimbecker. It is also near the watershed between the Credit River and the Grand River which is just west of the urban area, where the Blue Springs Creek begins. Acton also has Fairy Lake at Prospect Park, which is the fairgrounds for the Acton Fall Fair every September.

There was once a moraine south of Fairy Lake called Cobble Hill (for a time also known as Mount Campbell), which was high enough to afford panoramic views that were appreciated by local photographers. A gravel pit was established on it in the 19th century, and the top of the hill was lopped off in two stages: first to form a dam for one of the tannery's filtering beds, and secondly for helping to level off sections of road during the construction of Highway 25 in 1949.

== Demographics ==
Canada census – Acton community profile

| | 2021 | 2016 | 2011 |
| Population | 15,654 (+0.4% from 2016) | 9,462 (-0.5% from 2011) | 9,704 (-4.6% from 2006) |
| Land area | 579.64 km^{2} (223.80 sq mi) | 7.80 km^{2} (3.01 sq mi) | 16.14 km^{2} (6.23 sq mi) |
| Population density | 27/km^{2} (70/sq mi) | 1,213.20/km^{2} (3,142.2/sq mi) | 601.24/km^{2} (1,557.2/sq mi) |
| Median age | 46.4 (M: 46.4, F: 46.4) | 45.3 (M: 44.8, F: 45.8) | 38.9 (M: 38.6, F: 39.2) |
| Private dwellings | 7,185 (total) 6,844 (occupied) | 3,577 (total) | 3,645 (total) |
| Median household income | $62,400 | $88,690 |

Notes: Urban Area Profile, Statistics Canada
References: 2021 2016 2011

Population pyramid 2021
| % | Males | Age | Females | % |
|---|---|---|---|---|
| 0.5 | | 85+ | | 1.1 |
| 0.7 | | 80–84 | | 1.0 |
| 1.2 | | 75–79 | | 1.5 |
| 2.0 | | 70–74 | | 2.5 |
| 2.2 | | 65–69 | | 2.6 |
| 3.5 | | 60–64 | | 3.1 |
| 4.1 | | 55–59 | | 3.7 |
| 3.6 | | 50–54 | | 4.2 |
| 3.7 | | 45–49 | | 3.8 |
| 3.0 | | 40–44 | | 3.6 |
| 3.4 | | 35–39 | | 3.3 |
| 3.5 | | 30–34 | | 3.4 |
| 2.7 | | 25–29 | | 2.5 |
| 3.3 | | 20–24 | | 2.3 |
| 3.8 | | 15–19 | | 3.0 |
| 3.5 | | 10–14 | | 3.1 |
| 3.0 | | 5–9 | | 2.5 |
| 2.6 | | 0–4 | | 2.8 |

Mobility over previous five years
| Group | 2021 census | | 2016 census | |
| Group | Population | % of total | Population | % of total |
|---|---|---|---|---|
| Did not move | 6,455 | 73.5 | 6,055 | 67.8 |
| In the same municipality | 745 | 8.5 | 1,300 | 14.5 |
| In the same province | 1,475 | 16.8 | 1,455 | 16.3 |
| From another province | 70 | 0.8 | 80 | 0.9 |
| From another country | 35 | 0.4 | 45 | 0.5 |
| Total aged 5 or over | 8,780 | 100.0 | 8,930 | 100.0 |

== Sports ==
=== Teams and clubs ===
- Halton Hills Minor Hockey (Halton Hills Thunder): The 2013–2014 season was the inaugural season of the amalgamation of the Georgetown Minor Hockey Association (Georgetown Raiders) and The Acton Minor Hockey Association (AMHA) (Acton Tanners). Before this amalgamation, Acton was an Ontario Minor Hockey Association (OMHA) BB centre. The newly amalgamated association is an Ontario Minor Hockey Association (OMHA) AA-AE centre.
- Acton Chargers Select Hockey and House League
- Acton Curling Club
- Acton Ladies Hockey (Eagles)
- Acton Minor Ball
- Acton Skating Club member of Skate Canada-Learn to Skate, Powerskate, Figure Skate
- Acton Villa Soccer Club. Youth and adult soccer, indoor and outdoor
- Acton Aqua Ducks Swim Club, established in 1987
- Halton Hills Minor Lacrosse Association

== Government ==
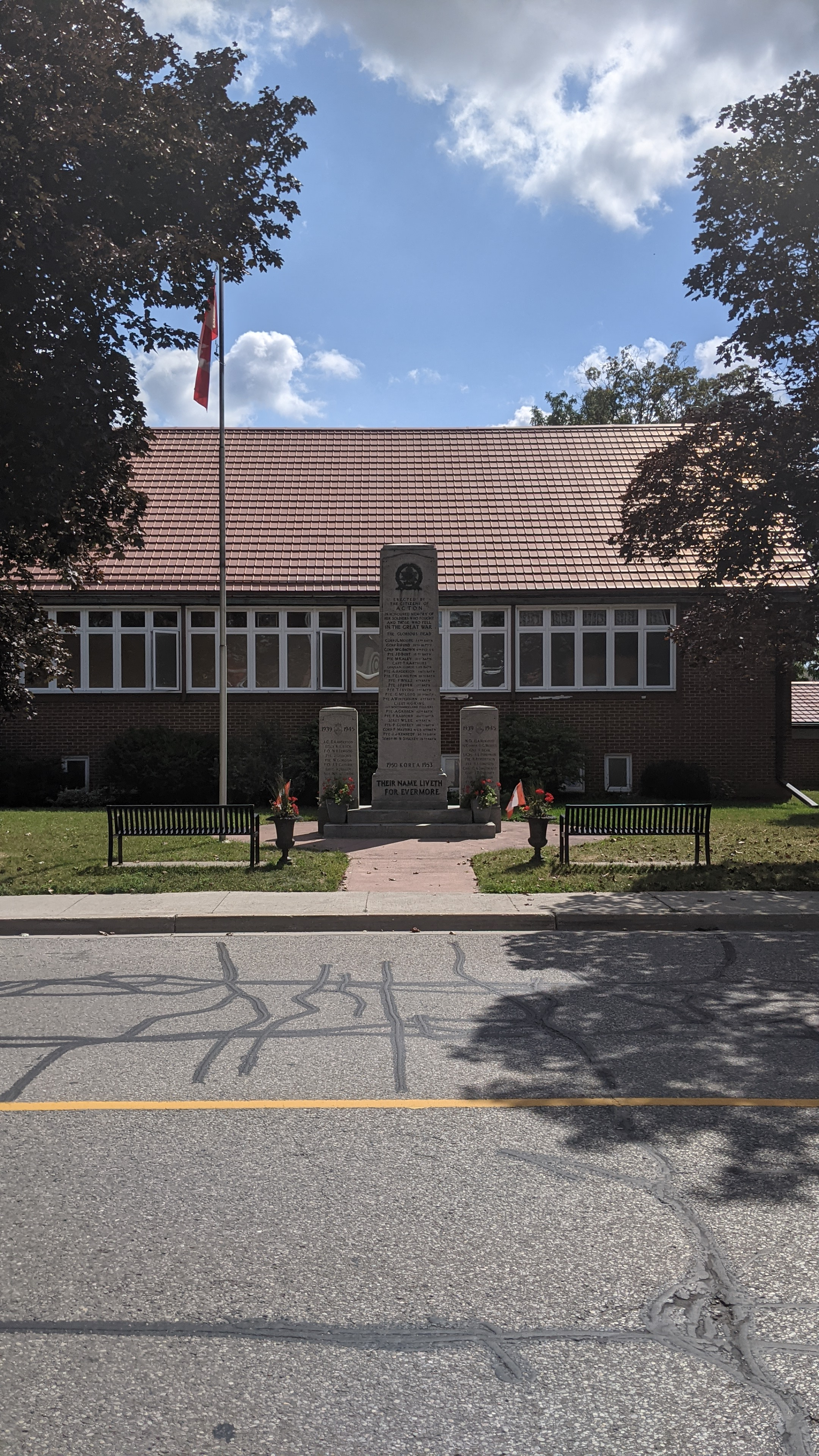
Cenotaph

No longer officially a town (since 1974), Acton is part of the Town of Halton Hills which is divided into four wards, each with two elected Councillors. Ward 1 represents Acton. Two others are Regional Councillors, each representing two wards on Halton Hills Council, and also serve on the Halton Region Council as does the mayor.

The current (2022–2026) membership of the town council is as follows:

| Position | Ward 1 | Ward 2 | Ward 3 | Ward 4 |
|---|---|---|---|---|
| Mayor | Ann Lawlor | | | |
| Regional Councillor | Clark Somerville | | Jane Fogal | |
| Local Councillor | Alex Hilson | Jason Brass | Chantal Garneau | Bob Inglis |
| Local Councillor | Mike Albano | Matt Kindbom | Ron Norris | D'Arcy Keene |

== Infrastructure ==
The Acton branch of the Halton Hills Public Library is located at 17 River Street. Initially built as the community's centennial project when it opened in 1967, it was replaced in 2012.

Halton Hills has its own fire department but policing is provided by the Halton Regional Police Services. Halton Hills has its own official plan which came into force in March 2008 and was consolidated in 2017 with the Region's plan.

== Education ==
| School | Type | Grades |
|---|---|---|
| McKenzie-Smith Bennett School | Public elementary | JK–06 |
| Robert Little Public School | Public elementary | JK–05 |
| Acton District High School | Public secondary | 07–12 |
| St. Joseph Elementary School | Catholic elementary | JK–08 |

== Notable people ==
- Judy Fong Bates – author and teacher
- Mazo de la Roche – author, for which Acton provided settings for some of her early novels
- David Henderson – MP (1888, 1891–1917), banker and merchant
- Sir Donald Mann - industrialist and railway entrepreneur
- Jeff McEnery - comic
- Art Moore – Stanley Cup winner with the Ottawa Silver Seven
- Joseph Petric – musician, author, teacher
- William Ross - bronze medalist in rowing in the 1928 Summer Olympics
- Clara E. Speight-Humberston – research scientist and scientific writer
- Jamie Taras – former professional Canadian football player
- Roz Weston – radio and television personality

== See also ==
- List of unincorporated communities in Ontario
