= George Kennedy (businessman) =

George Kennedy (1799–1870) was a Canadian businessman. Georgetown, Ontario is named in his honour.

== Early life ==
Kennedy was born at Snyder's Mills (St. Ann). His father was John Kennedy (1761–1847) and his mother was Charity (née Wurtz) (1761–1800). John was a teacher, a job he had trained for years before in Sussex, New Jersey. Charity ran the household.

His siblings include: John (1787–1874), Elizabeth (1788–1842), Ann (1790–1797), Charles (1792–1854), and Morris (1794–1870).

After the death of his mother (Charity), his father remarried, this time to Barbara (née Slough) (1773–1849). Barbara and John had eight more children.

Kennedy served with the British during the War of 1812. In 1819, five Kennedy brothers claimed land in Halton County, Ontario. George, Morris, Charles, Samuel and John settled in an area that is now in Georgetown, Ontario in 1823. Several years later, their brother-in-law, Benajah Williams arrived and settled in the area that later became the community of Glen Williams.

George dammed the Silver Creek property in the early 1820s to power a sawmill, and later a gristmill and foundry and then a woolen mill; a small settlement formed around the mills, nicknamed "Hungry Hollow". In the 1850s, he subdivided his land into small lots for sale to new settlers.

=== Marriage ===
George married Sarah Bedford (1798–1875) in 1821. They had nine children: Charity (c1822), Sarah (c1823), Harriet (1824) - the first child born in Georgetown, George Couse (1826), Emery (1827), Sarah Ann (c1828?), Louisa (1830), John Corban (1834), and Barbara Elizabeth (1836).

== Family history -- arrival in Upper Canada ==
Kennedy's parents were supporters of the King during the American Revolutionary War. After its conclusion in 1783, life became unbearable for the Loyalists who settled in places like Nova Scotia, New Brunswick and Quebec. Niagara District, Upper Canada was the place that John and Charity travelled to with their children. Land was granted to John in Gainsborough Township, Niagara District in 1795.

== See also ==
- Wilbur Lake
