= Wilber Lake =

Wilber Lake was a pond in Georgetown, Ontario, Canada. It was one of four prominent ponds in the village, and was popular with local residents for recreational activities including kayaking.

The lake contributed to the growth and economic development of the area, during the early years of the township. Wilber Lake was drained in 1915, and no longer exists.

== History ==
=== Mississauga Nation to early townships ===
During the period of European settlement, commencing in 1781, the British government purchased blocks of land from the Mississauga Nation. By 1818, additional land purchases led to the development of the Esquesing and Nassagaweya townships.

Timothy Street and Abraham Nelles were contracted to lay out the townships. Charles Kennedy was hired by Nelles to survey the northern tract. Kennedy received a significant parcel of land as payment for his work. Kennedy's brothers (John, Morris, Samuel and George) subsequently acquired adjacent tracts in the Silver Creek Valley.

=== Sawmills and Wilbur Lake ===
George Kennedy arrived in the area in 1823. He calculated that a small water supply along the Silver Creek would be sufficient to power a sawmill. The sawmill, and lake, that he built became the centre of a small settlement. The sawmill location was near the current intersection of Main Street and Wildwood Road.

In 1828, John Galt, through the Canada Company, opened a road which connected the settlement around George Kennedy's Mill with other settlements in the area. As Kennedy's Mill prospered, he built a gristmill, foundry and a woolen mill. Unfortunately, after that initial period of prosperity, business was poor. This led to the area being nicknamed 'Hungry Hollow'. In 1834, the Barber brothers arrived in Hungry Hollow, and within three years had purchased the mills from Kennedy.

In 1837, when James and William Barber purchased the mills and land from George Kennedy, the area adopted the name Georgetown, in honor of the original mill owner. The pond along Silver Creek, that provided water power for operating the mills, was named Wilber Lake, deriving its name from Williams (Glen Williams) and Barber (the enterprising Irish brothers). The lake was located near the present site of St. George's Anglican Church.

The lake provided water power for the mills, and recreation for the growing community. Villagers would, depending on the season, go fishing, canoeing or play hockey on the lake. There were, however, periods when the lake dried up. This earned it the local nickname of 'Lake Sometime', because sometimes it was there and sometimes it wasn't!

Nonetheless, both Wilbur Lake and Silver Creek played an important part in the area's ecosystem. Charles Young, son of Georgetown pioneer James Young, in his reminiscence of old Georgetown relates that,

"before dams were built to impede their passage, sea salmon swarmed up the Credit and all streams falling into Lake Ontario,

and that in the spawning season they were packed so thick in the Credit that if they had not moved one could walk in their backs dry-shod".

=== Decline ===
There were many other bodies of water that once connected to the Wilber Lake (later Wilbur Lake). The advent of hydro-electric power altered many of these sources.

In 1915, Wilbur Lake disappeared during the construction of a wooden trestle for the Toronto Suburban Railway. This vanished pond, which once graced Georgetown, and helped generate power for the earliest industries, was gone.

Silver Creek, a tributary of the Credit River is the only source of water that is still from (what once was) Wilbur Lake. Silver Creek, itself, is greatly diminished in size and flow from the period of sawmills and industrialization.
