= Halton Hills Public Library =

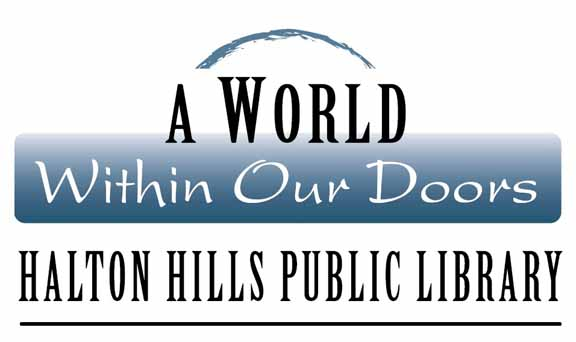
- 43°38′54″N 79°55′33″W
- Type: public library system for the Town of Halton Hills
- Branches: 2

Collection
- Items collected: business directories, phone books, maps, government publications, media, books, periodicals, genealogy, local history,

Other information
- Website: www.hhpl.on.ca

Halton Hills Public Library (HHPL) is the public library system for the Town of Halton Hills, Ontario, Canada. Through its two branches (Georgetown Branch and Acton Branch) and its website, www.hhpl.on.ca, the Halton Hills Public Library provides a range of services for Halton Hills residents. There are approximately 17,000 active cardholders, most residing in the communities of Georgetown, Acton, Limehouse, Glen Williams, Speyside, Norval, and surrounding areas.

== Branches ==
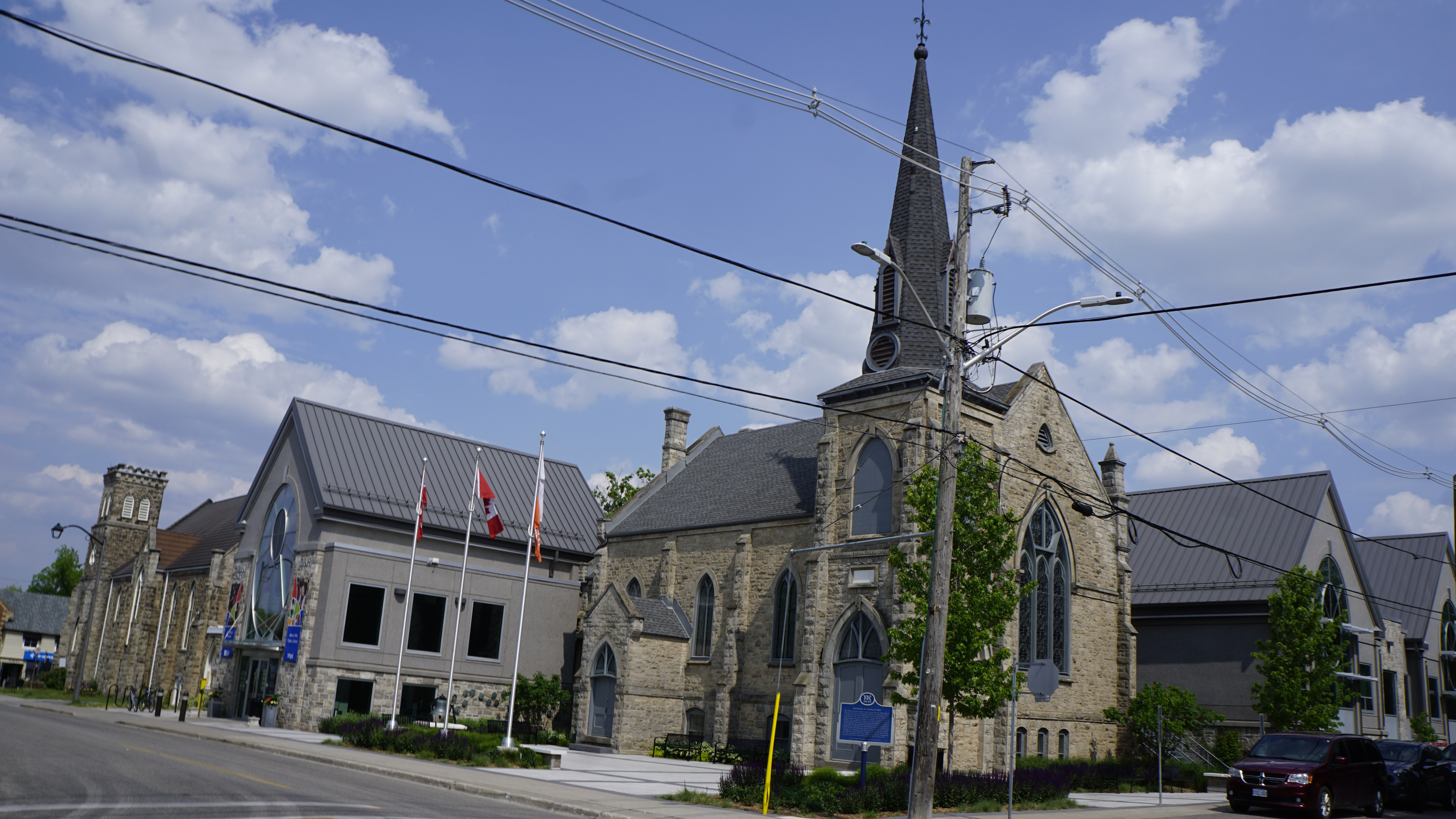
The Georgetown Branch

The Georgetown Branch is part of the Halton Hills Library and Cultural Center, sharing space with the John Elliott Theatre and The Helson Gallery. The branch began in 1913 in what was formerly the Congregational Church. A significant renovation and expansion of the branch began in April 2011, which increased the size of the library and shared spaces from 12,000 to 34,400 square feet. During the renovation, the Georgetown Branch moved its collection to the former Holy Cross Parish building. The newly renovated building opened in January 2013 with features that included a new teen lounge area, a seniors space including fireside lounge, a dedicated Local History Room, permanent space for Community Partners, four quiet study rooms, 17 Internet stations, wireless Internet access throughout the facility and self-serve checkout stations located throughout the library. The Georgetown Branch received $11.6 million in funding, and an additional $1,9 million for the Cultural Center. Green initiatives for the building such as geothermal heating and cooling systems and a green roof earned the space LEED Silver certification awarded in 2014.

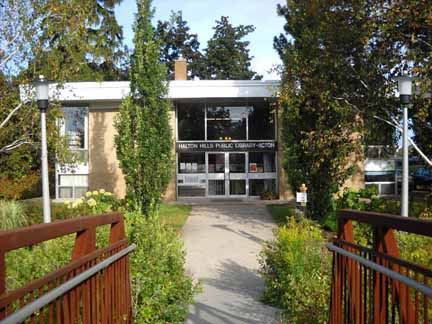
The Acton Branch

The Acton Branch was a stand-alone facility of 3,074 square feet (285.6 m2), built in 1967 as a Centennial project. A new facility of 9,000 square feet (840 m2) was built just east of the existing branch, made possible through an Infrastructure Stimulus Fund grant of $2.3M, with the remaining 1/3 of the cost being covered by the Town of Halton Hills. The new Acton Branch was completed on February 26, 2011 and features a large children’s program room, a Terraced Green for outdoor programs, a teen lounge area and adult lounge sharing a double-sided fireplace, two small meeting/study rooms, a large multi-purpose room for adult programs and meetings, 11 Internet stations, wireless Internet access throughout the facility, and self-serve checkout stations. Geothermal heating and cooling systems, use of natural light and other green initiatives earned the building LEED Gold certification awarded in 2012.

=== Branch locations and hours ===
Georgetown Branch - 9 Church Street, Georgetown, Ontario, L7G 2A3

- Mon. 1:00 pm-8:30 pm
- Tues.-Thurs. 9:30 am-8:30 pm
- Fri. & Sat. 9:30 am-5:00 pm
- Sun. 1:00 pm-5:00 pm

Acton Branch - 17 River Street, Acton, Ontario, L7G 1C2

- Mon. CLOSED
- Tues.- Thurs. 9:30 am-8:30 pm
- Fri. & Sat. 9:30 am-5:00 pm
- Sun. 1:00 pm-5:00 pm

== Service Offerings ==
- Information and reference services
- Access to full-text databases
- Community information
- Computer and internet access
- Printing and copying
- Reader's advisory services
- Programs for children, youth, and adults
- Delivery to homebound individuals
- Interlibrary loan
- Free downloadable eBooks, audiobooks, music, and video
- Genealogy and local history
- Newcomer services

== Getting a Library Card ==
Available free of charge for any person who lives, works, or attends school in the Halton Hills area. A registration form is required to be filled out and one piece of ID that shows proof of address is needed at the time of the application. Children will need their legal guardian accompanying them if they would like to get a library card. It costs $2.00 to replace a lost library card. As of 2016, the Halton Hills Public Library has switched to sustainable library cards that are made out of Nordic Birchwood and are 100% PVC free.

== History ==
=== Traditions ===
Through the middle of the nineteenth century, the formal education of the province's youth was a major priority, making attendance compulsory for an increasingly broad range of age groups. Approved textbooks were at the core of education, but a broader range of books was approved for school "libraries" (usually little more than a couple of shelves in the corner of the single classroom). Under certain conditions, the materials could be made available to others in the school district. By 1883, the Board of Education for Acton voted to transfer its collection from the overcrowded public school to the new Town Hall, where on Monday evening at 7:00 the public could go and select from nearly 1400 items. Practically the first order of business at the founding meeting of the Acton Free Library Board, 1 April 1898, was to accept the collection from the Acton Public School Board.

The Georgetown collection sprang from a related tradition—that of the Mechanics' Institutes. These were associations whose principal purpose was to encourage those who had finished school, particularly members of the working class, to continue their education. Evening classes and special lectures were a significant part of the program of the Mechanic's Institutes, along with a library and a reading room stocked with newspapers and magazines. The number of Institutes in Ontario had grown substantially since the first two were formed in 1835, but a large number were formed after 1877, when the provincial government, through the Department of Education, began matching local dollars raised. The Georgetown Mechanic's Institute's collection grew rapidly for about three years and slowly, if at all, for the next dozen. The number of active members in a community of about 1500 slid from more than 100 down to between 60 and 70. Occasionally helped out by a grant of $25 or $40 (and free rent) from the village council, the Georgetown Mechanic's Institute frequently failed to qualify for any money from the province. Annual membership fees of a dollar were a day's wage for the working men the Institute was supposed to benefit. By 1895, new provincial legislation encouraged its directors to turn the whole collection (nearly 1300 volumes) over to the village on the condition that access to it be free for all residents of the village.

=== The New Free Public Libraries ===
In charge of the newly created "Free Public Libraries" were the newly appointed Public Library Boards. In both communities, Board members included a representative of council. Acton's board included H.P. Moore, editor, and owner of the Acton Free Press, John Cameron, a local builder, and the Presbyterian, Anglican and Methodist ministers.

So long as the collection consisted of only a couple of thousand titles and library business was only done on two or three nights of the week, only one staff person, typically a young woman was hired. Acton's first public librarian was Miss Ettie Laird, a girl of 16 who also worked at the post office, where among other things she did telegraphy. For $40 a year she was to enforce all rules, keep the books in systematic order, keep a record of membership, notify delinquents, keep the books, shelves, etc., carefully dusted, to be courteous at all times to members and to report to the board any discourtesy or misconduct on the part of those who visit the library. Wages were raised to $50 in 1901, $90 in 1913 and $120 by 1918. These wages brought Acton in close line with Georgetown where Miss Alberta Glass was hired in 1899 for $100 a year. The rules of the Acton Library were fairly simple. You had to be fourteen years old and known to the librarian or vouched for by "responsible citizens". A library card cost five cents, a copy of the printed catalogue another ten. The Dewey Decimal System would not arrive until 1915, and a card catalogue well after that. Members could borrow one book at a time, and overdue fines after two weeks were charged at the rate of five cents a day. There were additional fines for turning down the leaves, and marking or defacing books. Noise and loud conversation were forbidden, as was smoking. The Acton Library was open 7:00 to 8:30 p.m. on Mondays, Wednesdays, and Saturdays. From the beginning, Georgetown's hours were substantially longer: 12:30 to 5:30 each afternoon and 6:30 to 8:00 (summers) or 9:00 (winters).

Both collections continued to be housed in the respective Town Halls. In Georgetown, the Board applied to the Carnegie Corporation of New York, which had been so generous with other public libraries across North America, to donate towards a new building. They were turned down in 1903 and again in 1910. The solution presented itself in 1912, when the members of the local Congregational Church, anticipating the union of their church with those of the Methodists and Presbyterians, decided to move next door to Knox Presbyterian. The founding president of the Georgetown Mechanics' Institute, and local industrialist, John R. Barber, with the other trustees of the Congregational Church deeded the building to the Town to be used as a library. The conditions of sale included the provisos that no "gambling of any kind" be permitted on the premises, that the Memorial window remains, and that the church bell "be rung each Sabbath for church services". The Carnegie Foundation was promptly asked for $4000 to cover the cost of renovating the building, and quickly refused. J.B. Mackenzie of Acton was given the contract for renovations (restrooms, a new metal ceiling) and the library opened in its new official home on October 10, 1913. It was equipped with gymnastic equipment, which during World War I was used for training recruits. Just after the war, the YMCA used the facilities.

The Acton Library occupied a 15 by 19-foot (5.8 m) room which was inadequate for the collection, let alone the possibility of a "reading room". Again, the Carnegie organization was applied to without success. In 1923, the board was taken to task at the annual provincial library convention for not spending enough on books. In their defense, the board claimed that they had indeed bought 140 books the previous year, but that there was no room for many more. In the spring of 1933, the Murray family left money to be used to improve library facilities, either in a new building or through renovations in the Town Hall. In the spring of 1935, the library moved around the corner onto Mill Street into what seemed like spacious new quarters in the front of the new YMCA building.

The years after World War II dramatically changed the character of both communities. Although in 1901 Acton had stood second only to Oakville in size among Halton's urban communities, there was almost no growth in population between World War I and World War II. Georgetown, by contrast, had seen steadier growth. Then between 1951 and 1971, Acton's population nearly doubled while Georgetown grew fivefold.

Most of these new residents lived in young families. New schools were opened, bringing with them (in some cases) special school library facilities. In Georgetown, some of the pressure was relieved when the junior collection was moved into the basement.

With Canada's Centennial still some years off, the federal government announced grants towards community projects to celebrate the nation's 100th birthday. The Acton Library Board was selected ahead of projects like a band hall, a swimming pool, or a chapel at the cemetery. The Board of Education chipped in with a corner of the Robert Little Public School property, and in June 1967, the new library facility opened. The new facility sparked a change in the way the Acton Library operated. Hours shifted from 4.5 to 24.5 per week. It had its own meeting room, tables and chairs for students to work at, and improved parking. The library now had a telephone, and was in a position to request books on interlibrary loans from other libraries in the region.

The telephone installed in the new Acton Library was, in many ways, symbolic of a new era in library service on a number of levels. Since World War I, high stands of inflexible wooden shelves overflowed with books, the occasional newspaper and National Geographic. The collections had been small enough that the two or three staff knew virtually every title. Many of the staff stayed on for decades or more. The card catalogues were housed in a range of wooden units, and featured handwritten cards, typewritten cards and the occasional printed card purchased with a book. Some books on the shelves still had the bottom of the cloth spine painted black, with white letters neatly painted on for the call numbers. A professional cataloguer had helped in the move of the Georgetown Library in 1913 and in the conversion to "Dewey" in 1915, but the subject catalogues were full of "local variations". The staff were all from the community, and had little or no formal education in librarianship. The 1960s, in a great many other fields as well as libraries, saw a growing movement to professional education, and provincial and national standards of service.

=== The Halton Hills Public Library ===
Despite considerable local protest, in 1973 the provincial government shifted the footing of local government, merging Esquesing with Acton and Georgetown to create the new Town of Halton Hills. In accordance with the Public Libraries Act, there could be only one Public Library Board and in 1974 the Boards merged, creating the Halton Hills Public Library.

== See also ==
- Ontario Public Libraries
- Ask Ontario
