= Georgetown, Ontario =

Community in Ontario, Canada

Georgetown
- Unincorporated Community
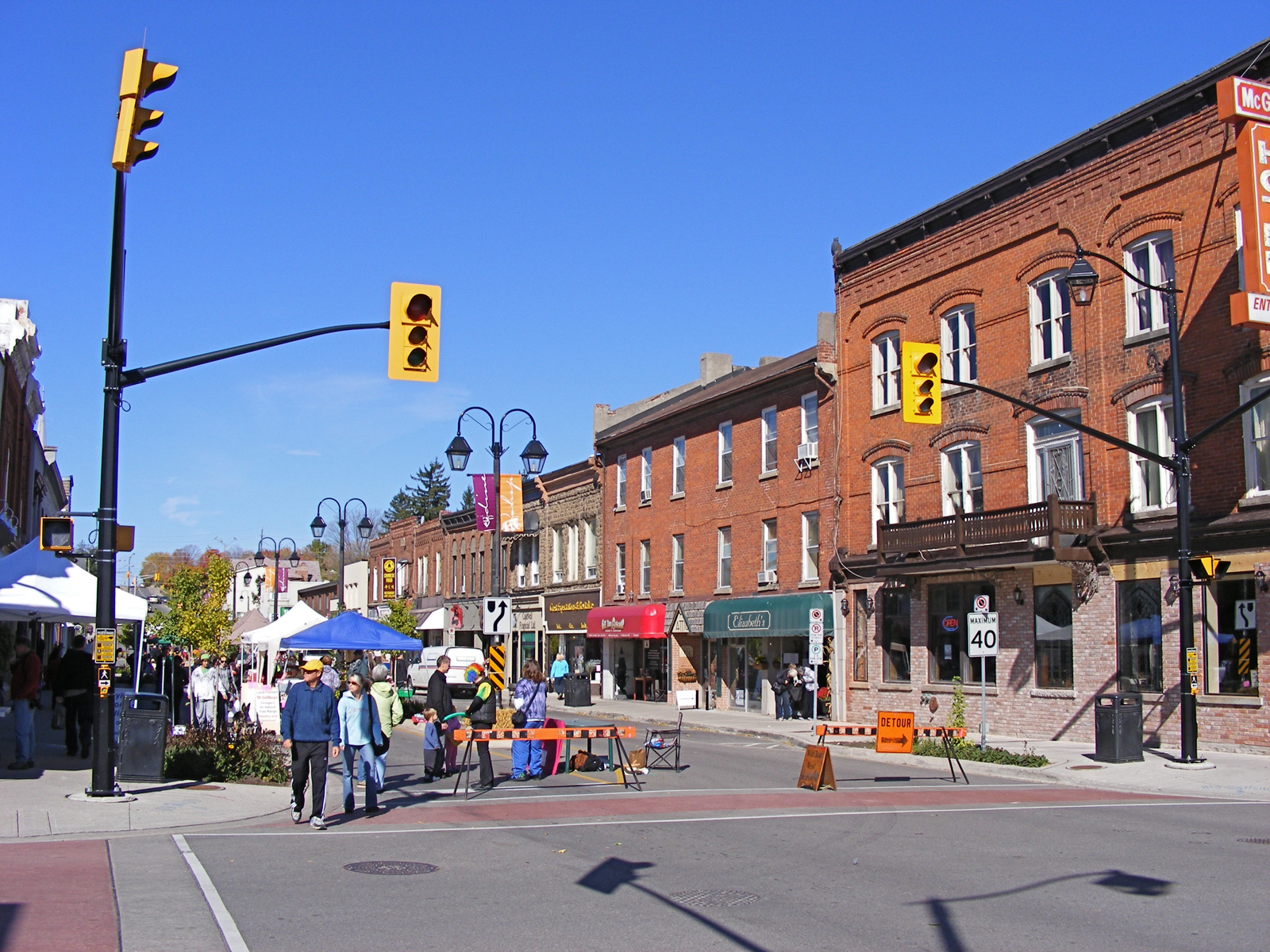
- Main Street

- Location within Regional Municipality of Halton Location within Southern Ontario
- Coordinates: 43°39′01″N 79°54′13″W
- Country: Canada
- Province: Ontario
- Regional municipality: Halton
- Town: Halton Hills
- Settled: 1837
- Dissolved: 1974 into Halton Hills

Government
  - Mayor (Halton Hills): Ann Lawlor

Area
  - Total: 24.03 km^{2} (9.28 sq mi)
- Elevation: 258 m (846 ft)

Population (2021)
  - Total: 44,058
  - Density: 1,714/km^{2} (4,440/sq mi)
- Time zone: UTC−05:00 (EST)
  - Summer (DST): UTC−04:00 (EDT)
- Forward sortation area: L7G
- Area code: 905 / 289 / 365 / 742
- Highways: Highway 7
- NTS Map: 30M12 Brampton
- GNBC Code: FBHBE
- Website: http://www.haltonhills.ca/

Georgetown is a large unincorporated community in the town of Halton Hills, Ontario, Canada, in the Regional Municipality of Halton. The town includes several small villages or settlements such as Norval, Limehouse, Stewarttown and Glen Williams near Georgetown and another large population centre, Acton. In 2021, the population of Georgetown was 44,058. It sits on the banks of the Credit River, approximately 40 km west of Toronto, and is part of the Greater Toronto Area. Georgetown was named after entrepreneur George Kennedy who settled in the area in 1821 and built several mills and other businesses.

== History ==
By 1650, the Hurons had been wiped out by European diseases and the Iroquois. The region was now open to the Algonquian Ojibwa (also known as Mississauga). By 1850 the remaining Mississauga natives were removed to the Six Nations Reserve, where the Mississaugas of the New Credit First Nation Reserve was established.

=== Early settlement ===
Commencing in 1781, the British government purchased blocks of land from the Mississauga Nation. In 1818, they purchased land that later became the townships of Esquesing and Nassagaweya. The task of laying out the townships fell to Timothy Street and Abraham Nelles. Charles Kennedy was hired by Nelles to survey the northern part of Esquesing Township in 1819, and Charles Kennedy received a significant parcel of land as payment for his work. The brothers of Charles Kennedy, John, Morris, Samuel and George, all acquired land close to each another in the Silver Creek Valley. Charles Kennedy built a sawmill in a location where Main Street meets Wildwood Road today.

George Kennedy took advantage of the Silver Creek in the early 1820s to power a sawmill, and later a gristmill and foundry and then a woolen mill; a small settlement formed around the mills, often called "Hungry Hollow". In 1828, John Galt of the Canada Company opened the York to Guelph Road (now Highway 7) which connected the settlement around George Kennedy's Mill with other settlements in the area. The road also extended to Galt, to Guelph and to Goderich.

In 1837 the Barber brothers, including William and James, purchased land and the woolen mill and foundry from Kennedy in 1837; they renamed the settlement Georgetown. The brothers started the paper-making industry in 1854, using electricity produced by a dynamo at the Credit River. Their products included large volumes of wallpaper. John R. Barber's home, Berwick Hall, still stands at Main and Park Streets. The business prospered for over 100 years. Other entrepreneurs arrived including Philo Dayfoot in the early 1840s, who started the local leather industry. In the 1850s, George Kennedy subdivided his land into small lots for sale to new settlers.

Esquesing Village (Stewarttown) was settled around 1818 and became the seat of the Township of Esquesing. It was also on the main north-south route to the steamships at Oakville. The Stewart Brothers had a successful mill in Esquesing Village, and James McNab had a prosperous mill in Norval.

In 1846, Norval had a population of about 200 inhabitants, served by two churches, various tradesmen, a grist mill, an oatmeal mill, a distillery, two stores and a tavern. Author Lucy Maud Montgomery who wrote the Anne of Green Gables series lived in Norval from 1926 to 1935 and considered it to be "one of the prettiest villages in all Ontario".

The settlement of Glen Williams had been called Williamsburg but the name was changed in 1852 when the post office opened. The Barbers' brother-in-law, Benajah Williams, was one of the first settlers here and the community's name was given in his honour. Limehouse, formerly Fountain Green, was a small settlement that grew after the railway arrived in the area in 1856; in addition to lime kilns (which opened in about 1840), a sawmill, blanket factory and paint factory opened in the village. In 1893, a fire destroyed the woollen mill, a paint factory and wood at the waterlime mill in Limehouse creating a serious financial problem for the settlement. The lime industry operated until 1917.

In 1846, Georgetown had a grist mill, sawmill, cloth factory, tavern, cabinet maker, foundry, chair maker, two tanneries, two tailors, two stores, three wagon makers, three shoemakers, and four blacksmiths. The population was about 700.

The Grand Trunk Railway arrived in 1856 and a line of the Hamilton and North-Western Railway reached the community about 20 years later. The two provided a convenient method for transporting not only passengers but manufactured goods. Hotels opened near the station, including the Railroad Exchange in a building that still stands. Georgetown was incorporated as a village in 1864. In 1869 the population was 1500; the Ontario Gazetteer mentioned Barber Brothers as a noted paper goods manufacturer with a staff of 40.

The settlement was incorporated as the village of Georgetown in 1865. The 1860s and 1870s were prosperous years. Recently opened businesses in that era included the Georgetown Herald newspaper, Culp and Mackenzie's carriage making enterprise, the Creelman brothers' machine shop and the Bank of Hamilton, the first to open in the entire Halton County. By 1880, the Chapel Street School and Baptist Church and the Town Hall had been built; the high school opened in 1887.

Georgetown residents began to receive municipal water in 1891, piped by gravity. Electricity was not available until 1913 although John R. Barber had purchased a generator in 1888 and installed it at the Credit River; that provided power for the family's paper mill.

On May 13, 1895, brothers Sam & John McGibbon leased, in partnership, Thomas Clark's Hotel for $600/year. The Hotel McGibbon was built by Robert Jones and was sold to Clark in about 1867. A double veranda graced the Main & Mill Street side of the building until the hotel was ravaged by fire in the 1880s. After the fire, a third floor was added to part of the building. The McGibbon family lived at the hotel. Sam's wife, Ann, kept white linen in the dining room, and in its earliest years had been a popular place for wedding receptions and banquets.

The Toronto Suburban Railway Company ran the Toronto-Guelph electric rail line through Georgetown opening in 1917. The line, which transported both goods and passengers, had a combined station and substation building located at 29 Main Street South (at the current Goodfellas Pizza site). The line closed in 1931 after business had declined substantially. The venture failed because of the Depression and the increasing prevalence of the automobile, buses and trucks. Its proximity to the competing Grand Trunk Railway (Canadian National) line was also a factor.

By 1921 the village had over 2000 residents and was incorporated as a town in 1922, with LeRoy Dale as the first mayor. Many historic buildings still stand in the heart of Georgetown and in its small, more rural communities.

=== Since World War II ===
In the mid-1940s, the population was close to 4,000 and began to grow more quickly in the 1950s when Rex Heslop bought farms and developed the Delrex subdivision. The Hotel McGibbon was still operating although Sam McGibbon had died in 1940; a daughter, Gladys, and a son, Jack, took over the business until 1962 when it was sold to Isaac Sitzer Investments and later to George and Nick Markou purchased the hotel in 1978 and operated it until the property was sold to a condominium developer in 2015.

In 1962, the Moore Park subdivision started construction and would attract more residents to town. By that time, Georgetown had its own hospital.

The GO train arrived in Georgetown in 1974; the service has since expanded with a great deal of available parking at the Georgetown GO Station and frequent commuter trains on weekdays. On January 1, 1974 Georgetown was absorbed into the new regional town of Halton Hills. One of the most significant changes since then included the Georgetown South residential expansion that started in 1989. The two paper companies, Provincial Papers and Georgetown Coated Paper Company closed in 1991 and 1977 respectively.

==== The Georgetown Boys ====
On July 1, 1923, the first 50 orphans of the Armenian genocide arrived in Georgetown to be educated and trained for farming at the Cedarvale Farm, now known as Cedarvale Park, operated by the Armenian Canadian Relief Fund. The children were known as the Georgetown Boys. By 1928, most had homes on farms. Aris Alexanian was a teacher and assistant superintendent at the school. He went on to open an oriental rug store in Hamilton, Ontario, which has grown throughout Ontario and is now known as Alexanian Carpet and Flooring. In 1929 the farm became the Cedarvale School for Girls; most of the residents found positions as domestic staff. In total, 109 boys and 40 girls were taken in by the Canadian government, considered by many to be Canada's first humanitarian initiative. Many became Canadian citizens.

==== French presence ====
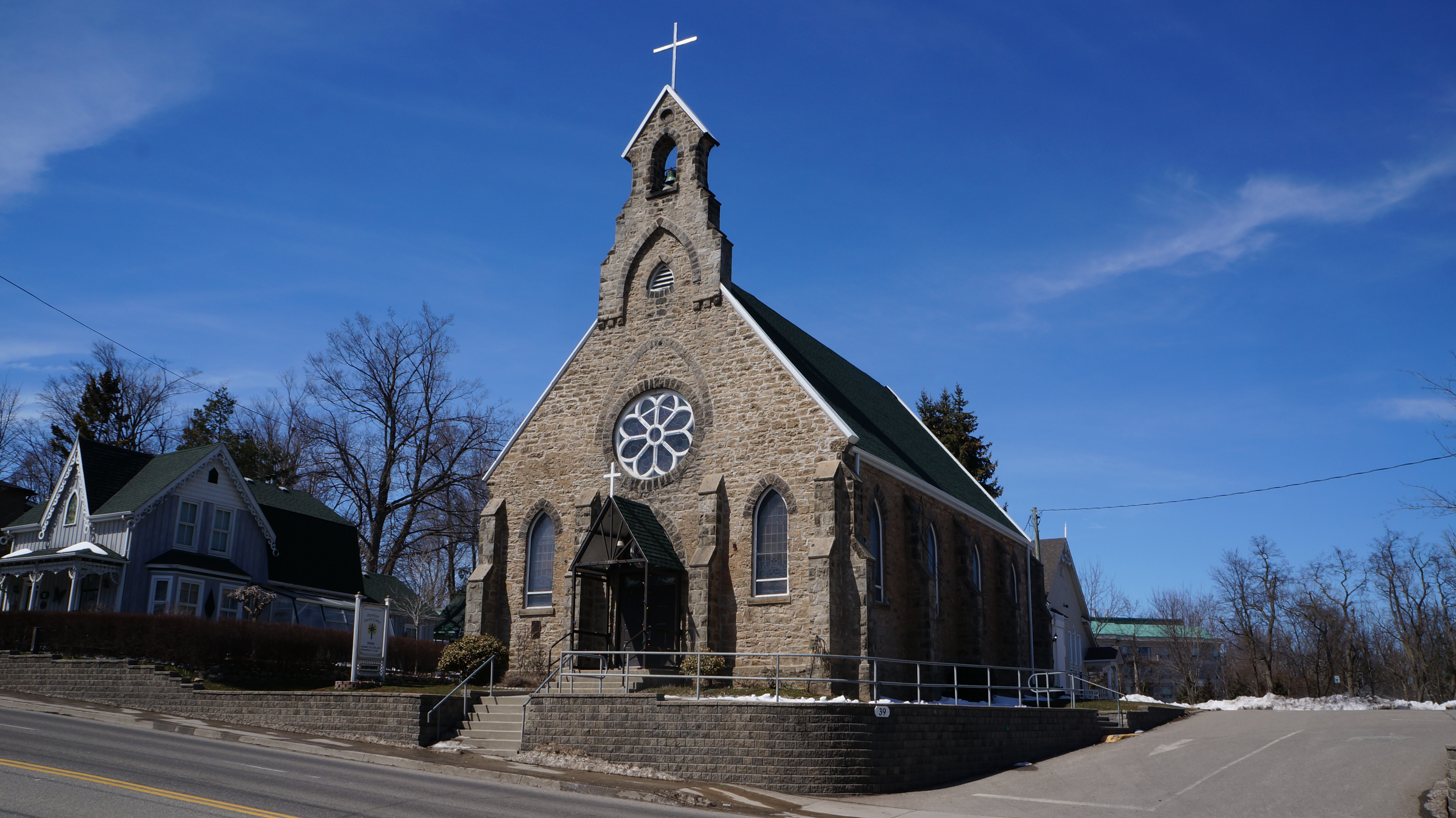
Église du Sacré-Cœur

The area had no early history of a concentration of French-Canadians, but that changed after World War II. First, in 1947, a boys' orphan farm relocated from St. Catharines, to Georgetown. This orphanage was operated by Father Clovis Beauregard and his niece, Therese St Jean. The Acadian boys from the orphanage decided to remain here in adulthood. The boys had learned apple farming and other Acadian families moved here to assist them with their apple business. Second, in 1957 a French-Canadian Association was formed. By 1966, about 150 French-speaking Catholic families created their own parish when the old Holy Cross Church was rededicated as L'Eglise Sacre Coeur.

==== Halton Hills ====
On January 1, 1974, Georgetown became part of the Town of Halton Hills when it amalgamated with the Town of Acton and most of the Township of Esquesing.

Together with the Town of Milton, the Town of Oakville and the City of Burlington, the Regional Municipality of Halton was formed, replacing Halton County. Halton Hills is well known for its terrain including slopes and inclines. In 1932, Bill Gauser proposed the idea to change the name from Halton to Halton Hills.

== Neighbourhoods ==
Georgetown grew as new neighbourhoods were added. The oldest section is around Main Street and Church Street. The arrival of the railway produced a new section — around King Street and Queen Street. The Delrex subdivision was the third part of the town that was added. Shortly after Delrex, Moore Park was developed. In 1989, the Georgetown South development began and the town has grown considerably since that point.

- Delrex: In the 1950s, Rex Heslop, the builder of Rexdale in Toronto, built the Delrex subdivision. Delrex is a combination of Rex and his wife Delma's names. In the 1950s and 1960s this area was referred to as Georgetown East.
- Moore Park: With the growth of Delrex subdivision, a second subdivision called Moore Park appeared in 1962.
- Trafalgar Country: Added in the mid-1990s and early 2000s, Trafalgar country is mostly bungalows and two-storey homes, and sits at the westernmost point in Georgetown.
- Georgetown South: In 1989 the farm land south of Silver Creek became the newest subdivision of Georgetown, Georgetown South. The development was undertaken by primarily Fernbrook Homes (West of Mountainview) and Canada Homes (East of Mountainview). Additional developments include Arbour Glen, Stewart's Mills and the Four Corners. Not to be mistaken as the "Four Corners" of Hornby at Trafalgar Road and Steeles Avenue.

== Demographics ==
The population at the time of the 2021 census was 44,058 (an increase of 4.1% over 2016) in the 24 km^{2} of the community. There were 15,501 private dwellings at that time. Data from previous years indicates steady growth.

Category	2011	2006	2001	% change
Population	40,150	36,690	31,510	16.4% increase
Private Dwellings	13,805	12,658	not provided	–

Census data for periods prior to the amalgamation into the present Town are as follows:

Census	Population	Change (%)
1971	17,053	▲65.6%
1961	10,298	▲198.3%
1951	3,452	▲34.7%
1941	2,562	▲11.9%
1931	2,288	▲11.0%
1921	2,061	▲30.2%
1911	1,583	▲20.6%
1901	1,313	▼13.0%
1891	1,509	▲2.6%
1881	1,471	▲14.7%
1871	1,282	n/a
1841	700	n/a

== Government ==
Georgetown ceased to be a separate town in 1974, and is now part of the Town of Halton Hills, which is divided into four wards, each with two elected Councillors. Two others are Regional Councillors, each representing two wards on Halton Hills Council, and also serve on the Halton Region Council as does the mayor.

The current membership of the town council is as follows:

Position	Ward 1	Ward 2	Ward 3	Ward 4
Mayor	Ann Lawlor			
Regional Councillor	Clark Somerville		Jane Fogal	
Local Councillor	Alex Hilson	Jason Brass	Chantal Garneau	Bob Inglis
Local Councillor	Mike Albano	Matt Kindbom	Ron Norris	D'Arcy Keene

At the provincial level, Georgetown is part of the Wellington—Halton Hills riding in the Legislative Assembly of Ontario. The current Member of Provincial Parliament representing the riding is Joseph Racinsky, who was elected in 2025 as a member of the Progressive Conservative Party of Ontario. Racinsky succeeded longtime MPP Ted Arnott and is one of the youngest members of the provincial legislature.

At the federal level, Georgetown is included in the Milton East—Halton Hills South electoral district for the House of Commons of Canada. The Member of Parliament for this riding is Kristina Tesser Derksen of the Liberal Party of Canada, representing the community following the federal election boundary changes that divided Halton Hills into two ridings.

Halton Hills has its own fire department but policing is provided by the Halton Regional Police Service. Halton Hills has its own official plan which came into force on 28 March 2008 and was consolidated in 2017 with the Region's plan.

== Climate ==
Climate data for Georgetown WWTP (Halton Hills) Climate ID: 6152695; coordinates 43°28′34″N 79°52′45″W; elevation: 221 m (725 ft); 1981–2010 normals
Month	Jan	Feb	Mar	Apr	May	Jun	Jul	Aug	Sep	Oct	Nov	Dec	Year
Record high °C (°F)	17.0 (62.6)	15.5 (59.9)	25.0 (77.0)	31.5 (88.7)	34.5 (94.1)	36.0 (96.8)	37.0 (98.6)	36.5 (97.7)	35.5 (95.9)	29.5 (85.1)	22.0 (71.6)	20.5 (68.9)	37.0 (98.6)
Mean daily maximum °C (°F)	−1.7 (28.9)	−0.2 (31.6)	4.6 (40.3)	12.1 (53.8)	19.1 (66.4)	24.4 (75.9)	26.9 (80.4)	25.8 (78.4)	21.4 (70.5)	14.3 (57.7)	7.3 (45.1)	1.1 (34.0)	12.9 (55.2)
Daily mean °C (°F)	−6.3 (20.7)	−5.2 (22.6)	−0.9 (30.4)	6.0 (42.8)	12.3 (54.1)	17.4 (63.3)	20.0 (68.0)	19.0 (66.2)	14.8 (58.6)	8.4 (47.1)	2.8 (37.0)	−2.9 (26.8)	7.1 (44.8)
Mean daily minimum °C (°F)	−10.9 (12.4)	−10.2 (13.6)	−6.4 (20.5)	−0.2 (31.6)	5.3 (41.5)	10.4 (50.7)	13.0 (55.4)	12.1 (53.8)	8.1 (46.6)	2.4 (36.3)	−1.7 (28.9)	−6.9 (19.6)	1.3 (34.3)
Record low °C (°F)	−33.0 (−27.4)	−31.5 (−24.7)	−28.0 (−18.4)	−13.0 (8.6)	−5.0 (23.0)	−0.5 (31.1)	3.0 (37.4)	0.0 (32.0)	−4.0 (24.8)	−8.5 (16.7)	−15.5 (4.1)	−29.5 (−21.1)	−33.0 (−27.4)
Average precipitation mm (inches)	67.8 (2.67)	60.0 (2.36)	57.2 (2.25)	76.5 (3.01)	79.3 (3.12)	74.8 (2.94)	73.5 (2.89)	79.3 (3.12)	86.2 (3.39)	68.3 (2.69)	88.5 (3.48)	65.9 (2.59)	877.4 (34.54)
Average rainfall mm (inches)	29.7 (1.17)	28.4 (1.12)	35.2 (1.39)	71.3 (2.81)	79.0 (3.11)	74.8 (2.94)	73.5 (2.89)	79.3 (3.12)	86.2 (3.39)	67.8 (2.67)	79.9 (3.15)	36.4 (1.43)	741.5 (29.19)
Average snowfall cm (inches)	38.1 (15.0)	31.7 (12.5)	22.1 (8.7)	5.2 (2.0)	0.3 (0.1)	0.0 (0.0)	0.0 (0.0)	0.0 (0.0)	0.0 (0.0)	0.5 (0.2)	8.6 (3.4)	29.5 (11.6)	135.9 (53.5)
Average precipitation days (≥ 0.2 mm)	12.6	9.4	10.6	12.4	11.9	11.2	10.6	10.6	11.7	12.3	13.3	12.3	138.9
Average rainy days (≥ 0.2 mm)	4.1	4.1	6.4	11.6	11.8	11.2	10.6	10.6	11.7	12.2	11.4	6.5	112.1
Average snowy days (≥ 0.2 cm)	9.4	6.2	4.8	1.4	0.04	0.0	0.0	0.0	0.0	0.27	2.5	6.9	31.5
Source: Environment and Climate Change Canada

== Sports teams ==
Georgetown's sports teams include :

- Georgetown Raiders Tier II Junior "A" ice hockey team, part of the Ontario Junior Hockey League.
- Halton Hills Bulldogs Junior "B" box lacrosse
- North Halton Crimson Tide Football Team HHMFA
- Halton Hills Blue Fins Swimming club
- North Halton Highlanders Rugby Football Club, competes in the Toronto Rugby Union.
- Halton Hills Minor Baseball Association, baseball organization for players ages from 5–21.

=== Defunct sports teams ===
Georgetown Minor Hockey Association – Raiders – In 2013, the Acton Tanners and the Georgetown Raiders Minor Hockey Association completed their merger to create the Halton Hills Thunder Minor Hockey Association. Georgetown Raiders Sr A competed in the OHA Senior A and Intermediate A ranks in the 1970s and 1980s. They are not connected to another Georgetown Raiders team which is currently a member of the Ontario Provincial Junior A Hockey League.

== Events ==
=== Georgetown Highland Games ===
The second Saturday in June, Georgetown is host to a variety of Scottish traditional games and celebrations.

=== Farmers' market ===
A farmers' market operates on Main St. in downtown Georgetown on Saturdays 8:00am – 12:30pm from June through October. The section of Main St. that hosts the market is closed off to vehicles during the event.

=== Georgetown Fall Fair ===
The Fall Fair was started in 1846. It is held the Friday to Sunday following the Labour Day Weekend. The annual event is held at the Georgetown Fairgrounds and consists mainly of carnival rides and rural contests, such as the tractor pull and demolition derby. The Georgetown Agricultural Society organizes and runs the fair each year.

In 2003, the Fall Fair was the scene of a riot which broke out between local youth (approximately 500) and the Halton Regional Police force. There were several teens arrested and at least another half a dozen shot by rubber bullets during the riot. No major property damage occurred, only a portion of a small white picket fence was damaged. Conflict in the years following the event has so far been avoided.

=== Georgetown Santa Claus Parade ===
The third Sunday in November, the evening parade begins at 5pm. Organized by the Georgetown Lions Club. Includes a variety of floats from local organizations and businesses, bands, and Santa Claus. The parade route is: Guelph Street from Sinclair to Mill Street and Charles Street to the Fairgrounds. These roads are closed to traffic from approximately 5:00–7:00pm.

=== Georgetown Craft Beer Festival ===
Also known as "Head For The Hills", this festival is held the third Saturday of the month in September, and runs from 11:00am–6:00pm at Trafalgar Sports Park. Organized by the Georgetown Lions Club, Georgetown Kiwanis Club, Georgetown Kinsmen Club, and Georgetown Rotary Club. The festival showcases craft brewers from across Ontario, gourmet food trucks, live music, and games.

== Education ==
Public education in Georgetown is managed by the Halton District School Board, while Catholic education is managed by the Halton Catholic District School Board.

=== Elementary schools ===
Catholic

- Holy Cross
- St. Brigid (With French Immersion)
- St. Francis of Assisi
- St. Catherine of Alexandria (With French Immersion)

Christian

- Halton Hills Christian School (a.k.a. Georgetown District Christian School)

French

- Sacré-Coeur

Public

- Ethel Gardiner Public School
- Silver Creek Public School
- Pineview Public School
- Park Public School
- Joseph Gibbons Public School
- Harrison Public School
- George Kennedy Public School (with French Immersion)
- Glen Williams Public School

=== Middle schools ===
Public

- Centennial Public School
- Stewarttown Middle School
- Silver Creek Public School
- Ethel Gardiner Public School

=== Secondary schools ===
Catholic

- Christ the King Catholic Secondary School

Public

- Georgetown District High School
- Gary Allan High School (Adult Education)

== Architecture of E.J. Lennox ==
Two buildings in Georgetown were designed by Toronto architect E.J. Lennox:

- Berwick Hall, the home of John R. Barber (1880–1904) which is now an apartment building.
- Georgetown High School (1889–1959) – built 1899 and demolished in 1959

== Industry and business ==
Major industries with head offices and facilities in Georgetown include Mold Masters Limited, CPI Canada, Eastwood Guitars, and Saputo. Other major industrial concerns include Cooper Standard, ADM Archer Daniels Midland Cocoa (was Ambrosia Chocolate), Howmet Georgetown Casting, a division of Alcoa Power and Propulsion and Kingsbury Technologies (Canada) Inc. The community also serves as the Canadian headquarters of Jehovah's Witnesses. The Georgetown Marketplace is Georgetown's Mall. It has roughly 63 stores. Georgetown has seen an explosion of population growth in the south. This has caused new businesses to appear.

== Recreation and parks ==
=== Hiking trails ===
The Bruce Trail goes through Halton Hills, passing north of Georgetown.

The town is developing a multi-purpose trail system in Hungry Hollow, on old railbeds and various other locations. A citizens group called HHORBA is trying to work with the Town in planning and constructing the trails to be as environmentally friendly, safe for hikers and enjoyable for bicyclists as possible. HHORBA helped construct a one trail and three bridges with members of the Bruce Trail. HHORBA in the past has been a member of the International Mountain Bicycling Association.

=== Georgetown Skate Park ===
Located outside of the Mold-Masters SportsPlex at 221 Guelph Street, this facility was made possible by the co-operative efforts of the Halton Hills Community through the Skateboarders, Inline Skaters & BMX Bikers of Halton Hills (SIBAHH) Committee and the Recreation and Parks Department. Funding was provided through generous community donations and the Corporation of the Town of Halton Hills. The facility is user supervised and is managed through posted regulations.

=== Gellert Community Centre ===
Located on Eighth Line just north of 10 Side Road in South Georgetown. The facility contains a large indoor swimming pool and hosts various exercise classes plus other community events. Outside amenities include a splash pad, three baseball diamonds, soccer field, six tennis courts and park trails. The Gellert Community Centre is the namesake of the late Jobst Gellert, founder of Mold Masters LTD, headquartered in Georgetown.

== Library ==
The Halton Hills Public Library is a two-branch library system. Both branches reflect the historic character of the community. The Georgetown Branch (9 Church Street) is co-located with the Halton Hills Cultural Centre, anchored by the former Methodist Church (now the Art Gallery) and The John Elliott Theatre. The Acton Branch (17 River Street) was built as the community's centennial project in a park setting, across a foot bridge over a creek.

On Saturday January 26, 2013 the renovated Georgetown Branch of the Halton Hills Public Library opened. The renovations included making the library more accessible to the public as well as more environmentally friendly.

== Media ==
Georgetown is covered by local newspapers and television through the following services:

- Georgetown Independent
- TVCogeco
- The Halton Compass
- Acton UP, local online news

== Transportation ==
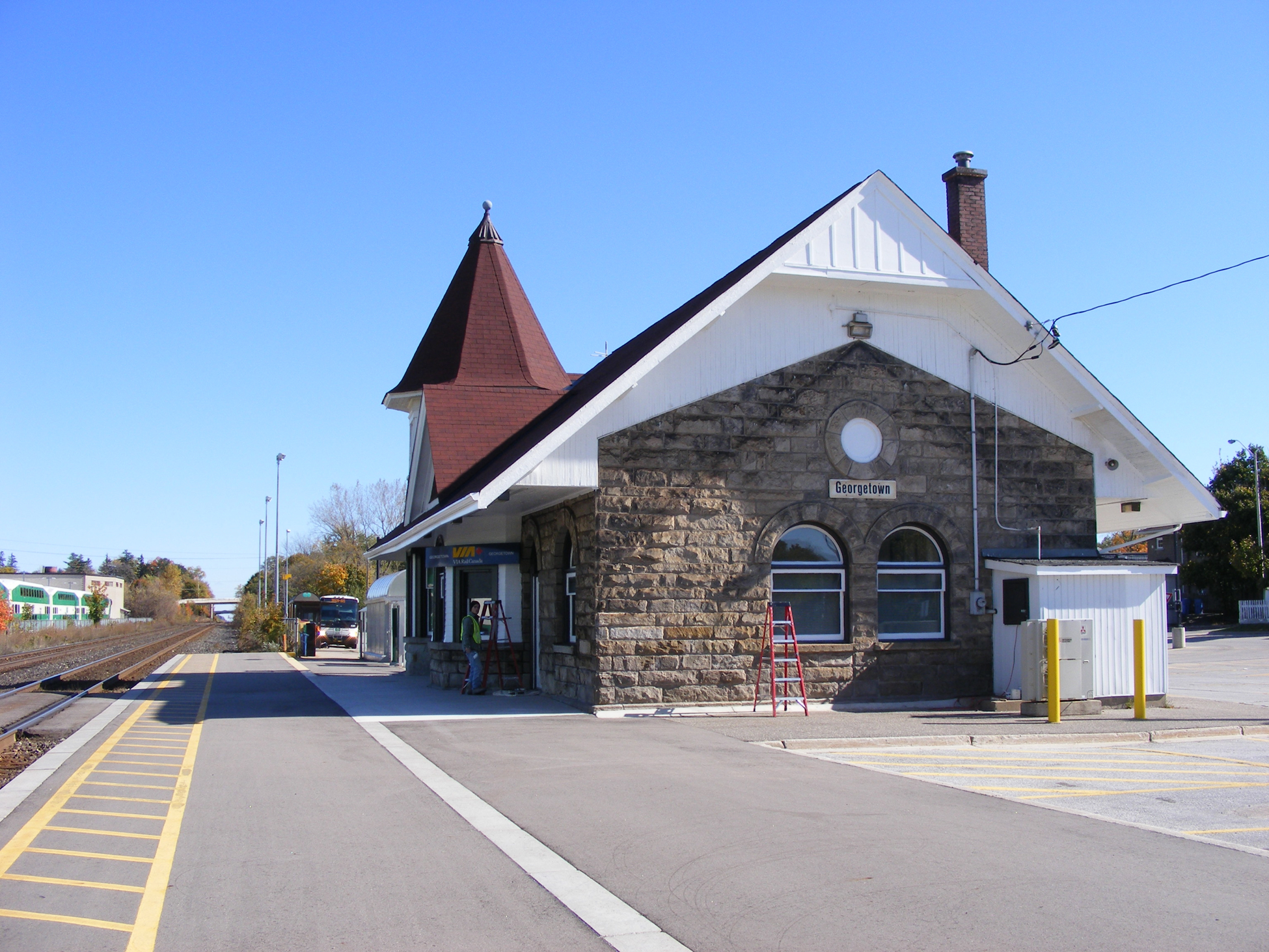
Georgetown Station

GO Transit and Via Rail serve Georgetown Station. There is no local bus service, although the Georgetown Halton Hills ActiVan provides local transportation for individuals with physical disabilities. GO Transit offers both bus and rail services through the Georgetown GO Station. The GO Transit Kitchener rail line runs between Toronto and Kitchener. The GO bus connects to many of the nearby communities including Brampton, Toronto, Acton, Guelph, and Kitchener.

Georgetown is also linked to the Provincial Highway network by Highway 7, and to Highway 401 by Trafalgar Road (Halton Regional Road 3), Mountainview Road/9th Line (Halton Regional Road 13) and Winston Churchill Boulevard (Halton Regional Road 19)

There are no airports in Georgetown; the closest are Brampton Airport (general aviation) to the north and Toronto Pearson International Airport (domestic and international flights) to the east.

== Notable residents ==
- Aris Alexanian, noted businessman and world traveller
- Adam Bennett, former NHL Hockey player
- Karl Clark, member of the Canadian Petroleum Hall of Fame
- John Cummins, former MP and former Leader of the British Columbia Conservative Party
- Kenneth Walter Davidson (1937–), former Speaker of the Legislative Assembly of British Columbia
- Jason Dickinson, NHL first round draft pick and forward for the Edmonton Oilers
- Dan Dunleavy (1966–), play-by-play broadcaster for the Buffalo Sabres and Toronto FC
- Timothy Eaton (1834–1907), founder of Eaton's department store
- Sarah Fillier, national Women's Ice Hockey player
- Marcelo Flores, professional footballer who plays as a midfielder for Tigres UANL and has capped with the Mexican national team
- Bob Goldham, five-time Stanley Cup Winner
- PJ Haarsma, science fiction author
- Mike Harris, Olympic curler
- Brian Hayward, former NHL goalie and William M. Jennings Trophy winner
- Shawn Hill, retired MLB pitcher
- Mike Holmes, star of the home renovation show Holmes on Homes
- Brent Ladds, former president of the Ontario Hockey Association
- Bryan Lewis, former NHL Director of Officiating
- Robert Maillet, actor and retired professional wrestler
- John Malinosky, former CFL lineman
- Noel Duignan, former Provincial MPP
- John McCauley, former NHL Director of Officiating
- Wes McCauley, current NHL Referee
- Lucy Maud Montgomery (1874–1942), author of Anne of Green Gables, lived in Norval for a large part of her life
- Cristy Nurse, Olympic rower
- Dan Talevski, Canadian singer-songwriter
- W. Stewart Wallace (1884–1970), historian, librarian, and editor

== See also ==
- Wilbur Lake
