= Gail Brown (disambiguation) =

Gail Brown (born 1937), is an American former actress.

Gail Brown may also refer to:

- Gail Brown (musician), Canadian musician
- Gail Huff Brown (born 1962), American broadcast journalist
- Gail J. Brown, American semiconductor physicist
