= List of historic places in Golden Horseshoe =

This is a list of historic places in Golden Horseshoe, the region of Ontario on the northwestern and western shores of Lake Ontario. It contains heritage sites listed on the Canadian Register of Historic Places (CRHP), all of which are designated as historic places either locally, provincially, territorially, nationally, or by more than one level of government. The following areas have been separated out due to their many listings:

- Regional Municipality of Niagara
- Regional Municipality of Peel
- Toronto
- Regional Municipality of York

== List of historic places in other parts of the region ==
=== Regional Municipality of Durham ===
Name	Address	Coordinates	Government recognition (CRHP №)	Wikidata ID	Image
Former Bowmanville Boys Training School/Camp 30 National Historic Site of Canada	2020 Lambs Road; Bowmanville ON	43°55′43″N 78°39′59″W	Federal (19684)		
Old Stone Church National Historic Site of Canada	1490 Road 15 (Simcoe Street); Brock (Beaverton) ON	44°25′35″N 79°06′57″W	Federal (7775)		More images
19 King Street East	19 King Street East; Clarington ON	43°54′42″N 78°41′19″W	Clarington municipality (7577)		
210 King Street West	210 King Street West; Clarington ON	43°55′00″N 78°35′34″W	Clarington municipality (7592)		More images
62-66 King Street West	62-66 King Street West; Clarington ON	43°54′46″N 78°41′28″W	Clarington municipality (7602)		
Colonel R. S. McLaughlin Armoury	53 Simcoe Street North; Oshawa ON	43°53′57″N 78°51′49″W	Federal (4801)		More images
Parkwood National Historic Site of Canada	270 Simcoe Street North; Oshawa ON	43°54′17″N 78°52′03″W	Federal (4300)		More images
Art Gallery; Former Brougham School House	1613 Highway 7 Pickering ON	43°55′03″N 79°06′35″W	Federal (13335)		More images
Bentley House	3590 Brock Road; Pickering (Brougham) ON	43°55′06″N 79°06′24″W	Federal (9836)		More images
Former Atha School House	555 8th Concession Road; Pickering ON	43°56′32″N 79°10′47″W	Federal (13092)		More images
Former Commercial Hotel	1709 Highway 7 Road, Pickering Airport Lands; Pickering (Brougham) ON	43°55′08″N 79°06′18″W	Federal (12992)		More images
Former Miller Residence	1622 Highway 7 Road; Pickering (Brougham) ON	43°55′05″N 79°06′38″W	Federal (13041)		
Former Mount Pleasant School House	1503 7th Concession Road; Pickering ON	43°56′07″N 79°07′29″W	Federal (13088)		
Former Pickering Town Hall	3545 Brock Road; Pickering ON	43°55′04″N 79°06′22″W	Federal (13152)		More images
Thistle Ha' Farm National Historic Site of Canada	Concession and Brock Roads; Pickering ON	43°56′35″N 79°06′28″W	Federal (9632)		More images
Former Port Perry Town Hall National Historic Site of Canada	302 Queen Street; Scugog ON	44°06′12″N 78°56′50″W	Federal (4211)		More images
Leaskdale Manse National Historic Site of Canada	Just north of St. Paul's Presbyterian Church on Durham Regional Rd. Uxbridge ON	44°12′11″N 79°09′38″W	Federal (7716)		More images
Ontario County Court House	416 Centre Street South; Whitby ON	43°52′32″N 78°56′38″W	Ontario (10545)		More images

=== Regional Municipality of Halton ===
Name	Address	Coordinates	Government recognition (CRHP №)	Wikidata ID	Image
Lighthouse	Burlington Canal; Burlington ON	43°17′54″N 79°47′43″W	Federal (4499)		More images
Royal Botanical Gardens National Historic Site of Canada	680 Plains Road West; Burlington ON	43°17′26″N 79°52′33″W	Federal (11665)		More images
Van Norman-Breckon House	955 Century Drive; Burlington ON	43°23′10″N 79°45′42″W	Ontario (8908)		Upload Photo
VIA Rail/Canadian National Railways Station	55 Queen Street; Georgetown ON	43°39′19″N 79°55′08″W	Federal (4622)		
Acton Town Hall	19 Willow Street North; Halton Hills ON	43°37′52″N 80°02′28″W	Ontario (18639), Halton Hills municipality (15009)		
Beatty House	98 Church Street East; Halton Hills ON	43°37′54″N 80°02′16″W	Halton Hills municipality (15010)		Upload Photo
Beaumont Knitting Mill	586 Main; Halton Hills ON	43°40′37″N 79°55′45″W	Halton Hills municipality (15011)		Upload Photo
Boston Presbyterian Church	9185 Third; Halton Hills ON	43°33′13″N 79°54′57″W	Halton Hills municipality (15021)		
Craiglea House	9722 Third; Halton Hills ON	43°33′38″N 79°55′30″W	Halton Hills municipality (15024)		Upload Photo
Duff House	9690 Regional Road 25; Halton Hills ON	43°33′14″N 79°56′24″W	Halton Hills municipality (15105)		Upload Photo
Georgetown Public Library and Cultural Centre	9 Church Street; Halton Hills ON	43°38′54″N 79°55′34″W	Halton Hills municipality (15124)		
Glen Williams Town Hall	1 Prince; Halton Hills ON	43°40′14″N 79°55′33″W	Halton Hills municipality (15106)		Upload Photo
Lilac Lawns	475 Guelph; Halton Hills ON	43°38′45″N 79°51′55″W	Halton Hills municipality (15131)		Upload Photo
Syndicate Housing Heritage Conservation District	69 Bower; Halton Hills ON	43°37′57″N 80°02′24″W	Halton Hills municipality (15192)		Upload Photo
Williams Mill/Georgetown Electric Light Company Power Plant	515 Main; Halton Hills ON	43°40′12″N 79°55′34″W	Halton Hills municipality (15193)		Upload Photo
16 Hugh Street	16 Hugh Street; Milton ON	43°30′41″N 79°53′00″W	Milton municipality (15217)		
66 Charles Street	66 Charles Street; Milton ON	43°30′45″N 79°52′51″W	Milton municipality (15215)		
151 Robert Street	151 Robert Street; Milton ON	43°30′37″N 79°52′55″W	Milton municipality (16722)		
Bronte Pioneer Cemetery	Bronte; Milton ON	43°30′44″N 79°53′35″W	Milton municipality (15219)		
Ebenezer United Church	12274 Guelph Line; Milton ON	43°33′10″N 80°04′34″W	Milton municipality (15127)		More images
Elliot House	8445 Boston Church Road; Milton ON	43°32′13″N 79°53′37″W	Milton municipality (16725)		Upload Photo
John Sproat House	191 Margaret; Milton ON	43°30′54″N 79°53′14″W	Milton municipality (16723)		
Mayne Corners Methodist Church	8560 Tremaine Road; Milton ON	43°31′09″N 79°56′10″W	Ontario (8179)		Upload Photo
Milton Court House	43 Brown Street; Milton ON	43°30′38″N 79°53′03″W	Ontario (10538)		
Nassagaweya Church	3097 15 Sideroad; Milton ON	43°31′32″N 80°02′09″W	Milton municipality (15130)		More images
St. David's Presbyterian Church	132 Main Street North; Milton ON	43°29′21″N 79°59′07″W	Milton municipality (15148)		Upload Photo
Amos Biggar House	2441 Neyagawa Boulevard; Oakville ON	43°27′49″N 79°44′33″W	Oakville municipality (8428)		Upload Photo
Bronte Cemetery	West Street; Oakville ON	43°23′11″N 79°42′47″W	Oakville municipality (15154)		Upload Photo
Cox Pioneer Cemetery	Wedgewood Drive; Oakville ON	43°27′59″N 79°38′56″W	Oakville municipality (17222)		Upload Photo
Erchless Estate	8 Navy Street; Oakville ON	43°26′30″N 79°40′00″W	Ontario (8169)		More images
First and Second Street Heritage Conservation District	bounded by Allan Street, Second Street, Lakeshore Road East and Lake Ontario; Oakville ON	43°26′52″N 79°39′39″W	Oakville municipality (15244)		Upload Photo
Gairloch Gardens	1306 Lakeshore; Oakville ON	43°27′44″N 79°39′02″W	Oakville municipality (15245)		More images
Henry Gulledge House	167 Trafalgar; Oakville ON	43°26′56″N 79°40′09″W	Oakville municipality (15247)		
Merton-Mount Pleasant Cemetery	2411 North Service; Oakville ON	43°25′01″N 79°44′01″W	Oakville municipality (15266)		
Munn's Cemetery	2 Dundas; Oakville ON	43°28′45″N 79°43′45″W	Oakville municipality (15268)		Upload Photo
Old Oakville Heritage Conservation District	bounded by Robinson Street in the south, Lake Ontario in the north, 16 Mile Creek in the east and Allan Street in the west Oakville ON	43°26′37″N 79°40′00″W	Oakville municipality (15272)		Upload Photo
Old Post Office Museum	144 Front; Oakville ON	43°26′34″N 79°39′59″W	Oakville municipality (15324)		
St Mary's Cemetery	south of the intersection of Lyons Lane and South Service Road; Oakville ON	43°27′14″N 79°41′24″W	Oakville municipality (15350)		Upload Photo
Sovereign House	7 West River; Oakville ON	43°23′25″N 79°42′40″W	Oakville municipality (15348)		Upload Photo

=== Hamilton ===
Name	Address	Coordinates	Government recognition (CRHP №)	Wikidata ID	Image
59-63 King Street West, Dundas	59 King Street West; Hamilton ON	43°15′59″N 79°57′22″W	Ontario (8267)		More images
Auchmar	88 Fennell Avenue; Hamilton ON	43°14′21″N 79°52′56″W	Ontario (8164)		More images
Bank of Montreal	1 Main Street West; Hamilton ON	43°15′19″N 79°52′12″W	Ontario (8330)		Upload Photo
Battle of Stoney Creek National Historic Site of Canada	77 King Street West; Hamilton ON	43°13′03″N 79°45′58″W	Federal (16143)		More images
Battlefield Monument – Stoney Creek Battlefield Park	77 King St. Hamilton ON	43°13′05″N 79°45′59″W	Ontario (8165)		More images
Building 2	Catherine Street North, Canadian Forces Reserve Barracks; Hamilton ON	43°16′28″N 79°51′17″W	Federal (7523)		Upload Photo
Burlington Heights National Historic Site of Canada	610 York Boulevard; Hamilton ON	43°16′19″N 79°53′09″W	Federal (1170)		More images
Christ's Church Cathedral	252 James Street; Hamilton ON	43°15′48″N 79°51′59″W	Ontario (8167)		More images
Church of the Ascension	64 Forest Avenue; Hamilton ON	43°14′58″N 79°52′11″W	Ontario (8168)		More images
Dundas Central School	73 Melville Street; Hamilton (Dundas) ON	43°16′09″N 79°57′30″W	Ontario (18023)		
Dundurn Castle National Historic Site of Canada	610 York Street; Hamilton ON	43°16′10″N 79°53′03″W	Federal (12341)		More images
Erland Lee (Museum) Home National Historic Site of Canada	552 Ridge Road; Hamilton ON	43°12′24″N 79°43′15″W	Federal (9357)		More images
Former Hamilton Customs House National Historic Site of Canada	51 Stuart Street; Hamilton ON	43°15′59″N 79°52′03″W	Federal (4000), Ontario (10496)		More images
Former Hamilton Railway Station (Canadian National) National Historic Site of Canada	360 James Street North; Hamilton ON	43°15′57″N 79°51′54″W	Federal (7868, (6637), Ontario (8341)		More images
Gage House – Stoney Creek Battlefield Park	77 King St. Hamilton ON	43°13′05″N 79°45′59″W	Ontario (8166)		More images
Griffin House National Historic Site of Canada	733 Mineral Springs Road; Hamilton ON	43°14′06″N 80°00′10″W	Federal (12521)		Upload Photo
Hamilton Waterworks National Historic Site of Canada	900 Woodward Avenue; Hamilton ON	43°15′24″N 79°46′18″W	Federal (4449)		More images
HMCS Haida National Historic Site of Canada	658 Catharine Street North; Hamilton ON	43°16′31″N 79°51′22″W	Federal (7624)		
John Weir Foote Armoury National Historic Site of Canada	200 James Street North; Hamilton ON	43°15′44″N 79°51′59″W	Federal (7626, (4303)		More images
McKinlay-McGinty House	232 Highway 8 Hamilton ON	43°16′16″N 80°01′03″W	Ontario (10514)		Upload Photo
McQuesten House / Whitehern National Historic Site of Canada	41 Jackson Street West; Hamilton ON	43°15′17″N 79°52′19″W	Federal (12101)		More images
St. Paul's Presbyterian Church / Former St. Andrew's Church National Historic Site of Canada	56 James Street South; Hamilton ON	43°15′17″N 79°52′12″W	Federal (12774), Ontario (19865)		
Sandyford Place	35 Duke Street; Hamilton ON	43°14′06″N 79°50′14″W	Federal (10706), Ontario (10566)		
Toronto, Hamilton & Buffalo Railway Station, Former	36 Hunter Street East; Hamilton ON	43°15′11″N 79°52′08″W	Federal (6531)		More images
Victoria Hall National Historic Site of Canada	68 King Street East; Hamilton ON	43°15′24″N 79°52′10″W	Federal (2210)		More images
Waterdown Post Office	31 Main Street South; Hamilton ON	43°19′58″N 79°53′30″W	Ontario (8210)		

== See also ==
- List of historic places in Ontario
- List of National Historic Sites of Canada in Ontario
