= Mansewood, Ontario =

Mansewood
- Unincorporated community
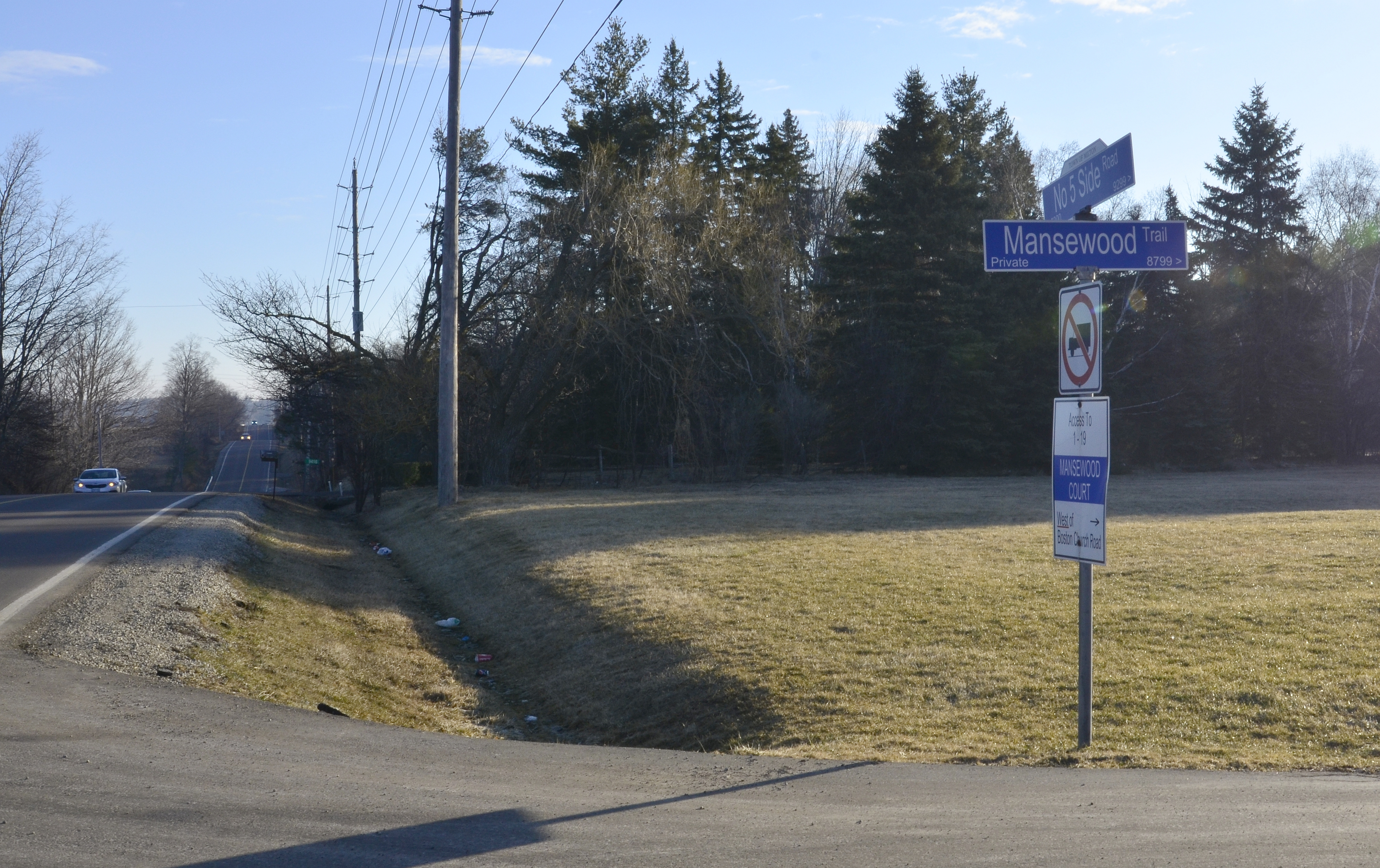
- Looking east on Number 5 Sideroad in Mansewood

- Location of Mansewood Mansewood (Southern Ontario)
- Coordinates: 43°33′05″N 79°54′29″W
- Country: Canada
- Province: Ontario
- Regional municipality: Halton
- Town: Halton Hills
- Time zone: UTC-5 (Eastern (EST))
  - Summer (DST): UTC-4 (EDT)
- GNBC Code: FDKOD

Mansewood is an unincorporated community in Halton Hills, Ontario, Canada.

Middle Sixteen Mile Creek flows through the settlement.

The early settlement was part of The Scotch Block, a large agricultural area in Esquesing Township occupied primarily by Scottish immigrants.

== History ==
A cemetery is located west of the settlement and contains a grave dating to 1815.

Mansewood had a post office from 1877 to 1914.

In 1889, Owen Robertson, a farmer from Mansewood, was noted for the exceptional growth of his Prize Cluster Oats, an experimental variety. Robertson produced 59 kilograms (130 lb) of oats from just 1.4 kilograms (3 lb) of seed.
