= Gail Brown (musician) =

Canadian musician and bagpiper

Gail Brown is a Canadian musician who was the first female bagpipe player to play in the World Pipe Band Championships. She is also the first female bagpiper to win the highest level competition in the World Pipe Band Championships in 1973, with the Shotts & Dykehead Caledonia Pipe Band.

== Early life ==
Brown grew up in Milton, Ontario, her family having strong Scottish heritage. Her family was connected with the Scottish settlement Scotch Block and attending the Boston Presbyterian Church since its construction.

She commented on her mother's influence in starting Brown's interest with piping at 7, where her mother had "always wanted to play as a young teen," but due to transportation constraints at the time, was unable to and encouraged her daughter's playing instead. She received her first solo lessons at this age with piper Don Deming before she took lessons with Bus Featherstone of the Dundas Pipe Band.

Brown joined the Milton Girls Pipe Band at the age of 13. She won first place in the Junior Piobaireachd in the 17 and under category at the Markham Highland Games in 1969, winning Detroit's Bob-Lo Highland Games in the same category prior.

In 1969, she was the sole female piper within the Woodstock Highlanders Pipe Band, which had eventually merged with the Highland Fusilliers of Galt. At 18, she was the Oakville Pipe Band's pipe sergeant for 4 years.

She attended Milton District Highschool, and spent her spare time tutoring students in piping. She received mentorship by piper John Wilson in 1967, both in group classes and private instruction, until she moved overseas.

== Piping career ==
Brown had initial plans of being a teacher abroad, but was told by a teacher's college in Glasgow that she would need prior college education in Canada before applying. After Brown completed high school, instead of teacher's college, she would leave Canada for Scotland to continue playing in piping competitions.

Brown initially spoke with Pipe Major Tom McAllister in 1970 to join the Shotts and Dykehead Caledonia Pipe Band, which the latter attempted to dissuade her for three years, saying to Brown that she was "just a wee lassie". She eventually joined Shotts & Dykehead Caledonia Pipe Band in 1973, the first woman to be accepted into the band. Her approval into the band was solidified with support from McAllister and Lead Snare Drummer Alex Duthart. Brown described her time playing in the band as not unfavourable, except with unwanted attention of being the only female that made her "feel like a freak". She later learned that McAllister received complaints about her inclusion from several other grade 1 pipe majors.

After she left the Shotts & Dykehead Caledonia Pipe Band, Brown founded the Milton Optimist Pipe Band in 1990 at the age of 37. The band had 20 members from the Halton region. In the summer of 1993, they won the Canadian Pipe Band championships in Cambridge, Ontario following their victory at the U.S. Open Championships. In 1994, the Milton Optimist Pipe Band won the juvenile grade at the World Pipe Band Championship. In 1997, the band had first-place honours in the grade 3 category while competing in the World Pipe Band Championships in Glasgow, Scotland. The Milton Optimist Pipe Band was renamed by 1998 the MacDonald Caledonia Pipe Band, and the group continued competing until 2005.

She teaches piping to both youth and adults from her home in Milton, Ontario. In addition to teaching and playing piping competitively, Brown was a judge for pipe band competitions until her resignation in 2017 from the Pipers & Pipe Band Society of Ontario.

Brown was inducted into the Milton Walk of Fame in 2010. She played in the opening night of the 100 Years 100 Women project in 2019, which was a collaboration between the Canadian Federation of University Women Milton & District and the Fine Arts Society of Milton. She was honoured in the same project under the arts category for her music career.

== Personal life ==
Brown was diagnosed in 1998 with breast cancer, which she entered remission after a few months of medical treatment.

Brown has three sons: Graham, Glenn, and Blair, who were all born and raised in Milton. Her sons all took interest in music, joining the Milton Optimist Junior Pipe Band led by Brown in their youth, which had them playing snare drums and pipes as careers.
