= Know You Better =

Know You Better may refer to:

- "Know You Better" (Ayla Brown song)
- "Know You Better" (Omarion song)
