= Halton Hills Christian School =

Independent school in Canada

Location
- 11643 Trafalgar Road, Georgetown, ON; Halton Hills, Ontario; Canada; 43°38′29″N 79°56′18″W

Information
- Type: Independent
- Established: 1965
- Principal: Angie Bonvanie
- Grades: Harmony-Grade 8
- Colour: Navy Blue
- Mascot: Bruce the Moose
- Nickname: HHCS
- Affiliations: Edvance
- Website: www.haltonhillschristianschool.org

Halton Hills Christian School (HHCS) is an independent Christian school located in Halton Hills, Ontario, Canada. HHCS is a member of the Edvance Christian School Association.

== History ==
In January 1957, a group of parents initiated plans to establish a Christian school. By October 1960, the school was incorporated as Georgetown District Christian School, and funds were gradually raised to purchase an eight-acre property for its location. The school was dedicated in 1965, with Psalm 111:10 chosen for the cornerstone: "For reverence of the Lord is the beginning of wisdom." During its first school year, HHCS had three classrooms, 99 students, and three staff members. Since its opening, the school building has been expanded four times to accommodate a growing student population. A preschool program for four-year-old children was established in 1997.

In the fall of 2008, the board and development committee initiated a rebranding process. In the spring of 2009, a new name and logo were presented and approved by the school membership. The school's name was officially changed in September 2009 from Georgetown District Christian School to Halton Hills Christian School.

== Academics ==
The school offers courses in art, Bible, French, language arts, spelling, mathematics, social sciences, music, and physical education.

== Co-curricular ==
Choirs regularly perform at local churches and nursing homes throughout the year.

Students in grades 1–8 participate in a biennial science fair, with projects from grades 7 and 8 eligible for competition at the provincial level.

Monthly chapels are held.

In winter, the school engages in a food drive for the local food bank, collects items for Operation Christmas Child, and organizes a toy drive during the Christmas season.

Annually, the school hosts a musical production to celebrate a Christian holiday, involving all students from preschool to grade 8.

== Harmony Preschool ==
Harmony Preschool is affiliated with Halton Hills Christian School. The staff and students represent various Christian denominations.

== Arrowsmith ==
Following the methods developed by Barbara Arrowsmith Young of Toronto, HHCS initiated a cognitive abilities class to support students with learning disabilities.

Students at HHCS spend varying percentages of their school day in the Arrowsmith room—either 50%, 62%, or 74%—depending on their individual program. The classroom is staffed with two teachers trained in the Arrowsmith methodology, along with one teaching assistant to support classroom activities.

== Renovation ==
Halton Hills Christian School renovated their school in 2013.
