= Scotch Block, Ontario =

Scotch Block
- Unincorporated community
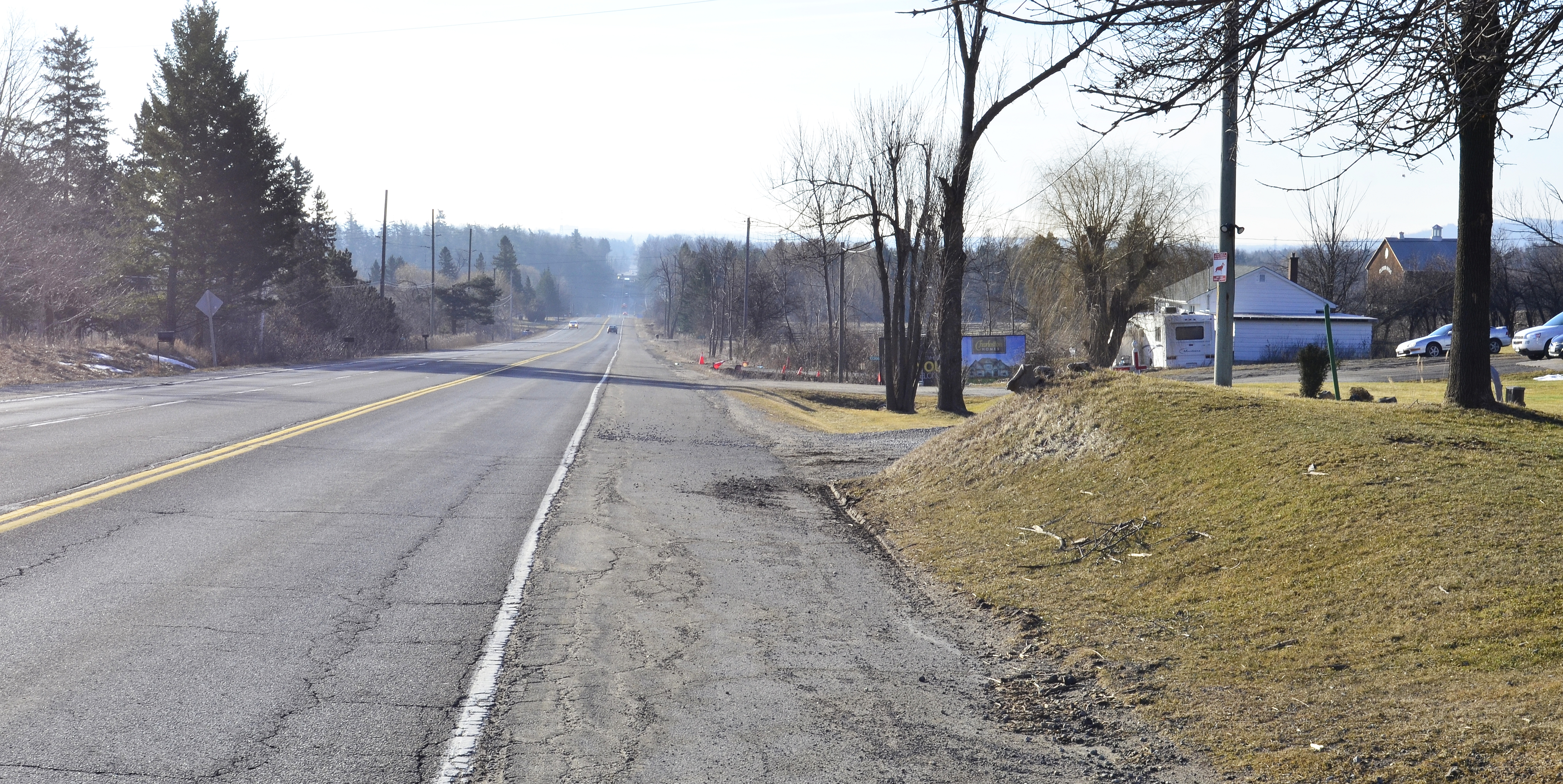
- Looking south on Highway 25 in Scotch Block

- Location of Scotch Block Scotch Block (Southern Ontario)
- Coordinates: 43°34′19″N 79°57′39″W
- Country: Canada
- Province: Ontario
- Regional municipality: Halton
- Town: Halton Hills
- Time zone: UTC-5 (Eastern (EST))
  - Summer (DST): UTC-4 (EDT)
- GNBC Code: FDVUT

Scotch Block is an unincorporated community in Halton Hills, Ontario, Canada.

Settlers arrived in the early 1800s, and Scotch Block encompassed approximately 35 square kilometres (10 sq mi) of agricultural land in southwestern Esquesing Township.

Sixteen Mile Creek flows through the settlement, and the present-day Scotch Block Dam and Reservoir is located there. Scotch Block is located on the Niagara Escarpment, and a portion of the Bruce Trail passes through it.

== History ==
=== Mississauga nation ===
The Haudenosaunee resided in Southern Ontario since the 5th century in Southern Ontario, where pollen analysis from lake sediments showed major indications of agricultural development from the Indigenous groups. The Mississauga nation lived across the area that was later known as the Scotch Block of Esquesing Township. The Canadian government made purchases of Mississauga land in the years 1805, 1818, and 1827, in which the Scotch Block was purchased in the 1818 sale.

The Mississauga nation, after further seizure of land, had realised the seizure of their land was permanent as British colonists denied tribal rights by agreements made within purchasing contracts. Chief of the Equissink (Bronte Creek), Quinipeno, had stated to Indian officers in 1805:

While Colonel Butler was our Father we were told our Father the Kind wanted some Land for his people, it was some time before we sold it, but when we found it was wanted by the King to settle his people on it, who we were told would be of great use to us, we granted it accordingly. Father—we have not found this so, as the inhabitants drive us away instead of helping us, we want to know why we are served in that manner... Colonel Butler told us the Farmers would help us, but instead of doing so when we encamp on the Land they drove us off and shoot our dogs, and never give us any assistance as was promised to our old Chiefs.

=== Settlers of Scottish origin ===
James and John Stewart, early settlers from Perth, Scotland, made a request to the government in 1819 for a Scottish settlement in Esquesing Township. That same year, James McNab, a land promoter living in Toronto Township, petitioned to bring 30 families of Scottish origin to Ontario from the economically depressed towns of Barnet and Ryegate in the US state of Vermont. Both towns had been founded by a group-migration from Scotland in the late 1700s, and many then migrated to the Scotch Block area. Other Scotch Block settlers arrived directly from Scotland, the majority from the Perthshire and Roxburghshire regions. Another Scottish family, the Laidlaws, moved first to York in Upper Canada, and then to Scotch Block.

The settlement was at first referred to as "The Scotch Settlement" and "The Settlement", but eventually became known as "The Scotch Block". It was the most ethnically homogeneous region in the county, its first settlers "Scotch almost without exception".

An early settler, James Laidlaw, described The Scotch Block in a letter to his son, Robert, in Scotland in 1819:

We are mostly all Scotchmen and have got a township to be all together, or what is called a parish in Scotland. They give 60,000 acres for one Township. There are a great many people settling here. Government has bought a large tract of Country from the Indians last year. One end of it was about twelve miles from York and very good land so that people are all going on it, it being so near the capital of the Province... The money here with merchants and people and trade is as plenty as ever I saw it in any town in Scotland. There is a market here every day for veal and mutton, and people come in from the County with butter and cheese and eggs, potatoes, onions and carrots and melons, squashes and pumpkins with many things unknown in Scotland. The people here speak very good English. There is many of our Scotch words they cannot understand. They live more independent than King George, for if they have been any time here and got a few acres of their farm cleared, they have all plenty to live upon and what they have to sell they get always money for it for bringing it to York. There is a good road goes straight north from York into the County for Fifty miles, and the farm houses almost all two storeys high. Some of them will have as good as twelve cows and four or five horses. They are growing very rich, for they pay no taxes, but just a perfect trifle, and ride in their gig or chaise like lords. . . . your loving father till death. JAMES LAIDLAW

=== The Presbyterian Church ===
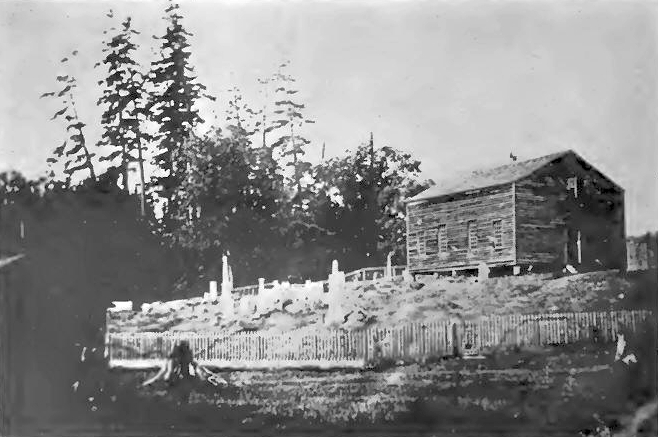
The meeting house in Scotch Block, circa 1860s

Beginning in 1820, church services were held at James Laidlaw's farm, and were led by various itinerant Presbyterian ministers.

In 1824, a meeting house (church), school and cemetery were built in the southeast portion of Scotch Block.

The Stewarts' request for the establishment of Scotch Block in 1819 had described that the settlement would "support a regular bred Clergyman of their Persuasion and who understand their language". When it proved difficult to attract a permanent church minister, the Scotch Block residents petitioned the government for assistance, writing [sic]:

Their Sabbaths are silent, and in danger of being forgotten - The sound of the gospel very seldom reaches their ears - But, in a land of Strangers, they are wandering like shiip, without a Sheephard, and their rising generation are in danger of sinking into a state of barborous ignorance.

A permanent minister settled in Scotch Block in 1832.

The meeting house was renamed Boston Presbyterian Church in 1844, in honour of Thomas Boston, a Scottish church leader. The area near the church eventually became a distinct community known as Boston. That same year, Peter Scott built the first brick house in Scotch Block.

=== Other events ===
The first doctor was Christopher Russell, who settled in Scotch Block in 1833 and married John Stewart's daughter. They remained there until 1841.

Mail delivery on horseback began in 1836, and occurred twice weekly.

In 1837, John Stewart participated in the Upper Canada Rebellion and was sentenced to transportation. Initially confined to prison at Fort Henry, Ontario, he escaped and fled to the United States, and was later pardoned.

The Scotch Block post office opened in 1852, and was operated by Thomas Hume from his home. It remained open until 1873, and again from 1879 to 1914.

=== Recent history ===
In 1971, the Scotch Block Dam and Reservoir opened to control water levels on Sixteen Mile Creek.

The Scotch Block Winery opened in 1999, the first farm winery in the Regional Municipality of Halton.

== Heritage properties ==
Heritage properties in Scotch Block recognized by the Town of Halton Hills include:

- Chisholm Family Farm House. The Chisholm's were a prominent local family.
- Land Acres, a home owned by the Sproat Family from 1870 until 1949.
- Towercliffe House, built by the Bates family, who operated a Stone Quarry.
