= Ayla Brown =

American singer (born 1988)

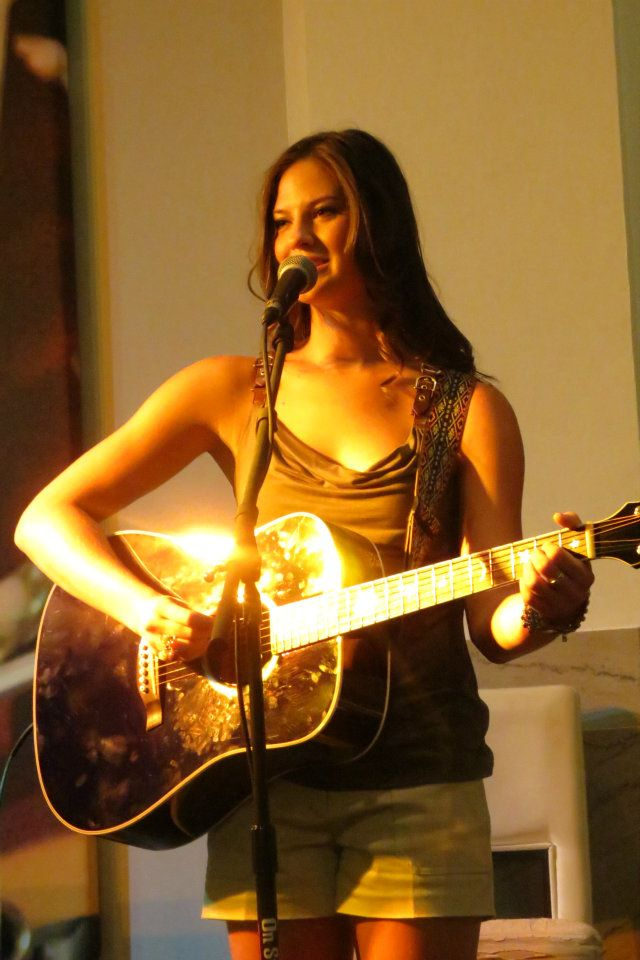
- Brown performing in 2013

Background information
- Born: Ayla Marie Brown; July 28, 1988 (age 38)
- Origin: Wrentham, Massachusetts, U.S.
- Genre: Pop
- Occupation: Singer-songwriter
- Years active: 2004–present
- Labels: Double Deal; Ambient
- Website: aylabrown.com

Ayla Marie Brown (born July 28, 1988) is an American singer and former NCAA basketball player from Wrentham, Massachusetts. In 2006, she was a contestant on fifth season of American Idol, finishing within the top 16. Shortly after the season's conclusion, Brown attended Boston College on a full basketball scholarship, and graduated in 2010.

Brown is the elder daughter of former United States Senator of Massachusetts and United States Ambassador to New Zealand and Samoa, Scott Brown, and NH1 News reporter Gail Huff. She is the sixth leading scorer in Massachusetts basketball history, male or female, a two-time Gatorade Player of the Year, and was named the top female basketball player in Massachusetts. Brown has released two full-length studio albums, is a spokesperson for the Songs of Love Foundation, and currently serves as the official anthem singer of the Philadelphia 76ers.

== Early life ==
Brown finished her high school career as one of the top female basketball players in Massachusetts history, scoring 2,358 career points. This made her the sixth place all-time leading scorer in Massachusetts basketball history, male or female. In addition, she is a two-time Gatorade Player of the Year and was named the top female basketball player in Massachusetts. Brown finished her senior season as the captain of the Noble and Greenough School girls' basketball team, missing her last few games to compete on the fifth season of American Idol.

Brown was scouted by the staff at Boston College beginning at the age of 15. She made a commitment to the school, and went on to attend the college on a full athletic scholarship, majoring in communications. She played the forward position for the Boston College Lady Eagles, wearing jersey number 1. Brown's nickname given to her by her teammates was "Downtown Ayla Brown" due to her ability to sink 3-pointers and lengthy shots.

=== American Idol (2006) ===
Brown auditioned for American Idol at Gillette Stadium in Foxborough, Massachusetts, in the summer of 2005 before advancing to the judges' round in Boston. She was eliminated from the show on March 9, 2006.

For her audition song, Brown sang "Ain't No Mountain High Enough." Randy Jackson said she had a good, though undistinguished voice. Paula Abdul also thought Brown was a good singer, but that she favored vocal power over dynamics. Simon Cowell accused Brown of being "robotic and somewhat empty." In the end, Jackson and Abdul (who made the final judgment) sent Brown through to the Hollywood rounds.

During the Hollywood rounds, Brown sang "Reflection" by Christina Aguilera, and was selected as one of 24 semi-finalists.

==== Performances ====
Week	Theme	Song Sung	Artist	Order Sung	Status
Top 24 (12 Women)	Contestant's Choice	"Reflection"	Christina Aguilera	4	Advanced
Top 20 (10 Women)	Contestant's Choice	"I Want You to Need Me"	Celine Dion	6	Advanced
Top 16 (8 Women)	Contestant's Choice	"Unwritten"	Natasha Bedingfield	6	Eliminated

== Boston College Eagles (2006-2010) ==
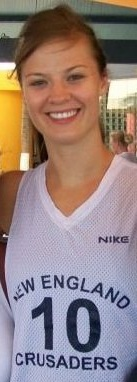
Ayla Brown during a pickup basketball game in 2010

Brown's career with the Boston College Lady Eagles began in the 2006–07 season, her freshman year. During the season the 6' 0" forward averaged 8.2 points per game, the second-highest average on the team. The Eagles finished one game below .500 for their overall record and failed to make post-season play (NCAA or WNIT) for the first time in several years.

In her sophomore season with the Lady Eagles, Brown finished the season averaging 7.4 points and 5.6 rebounds, having started 31 of 33 games. She averaged 28.5 minutes a game. After finishing the regular season with a 21–12 overall record, BC advanced to the second round of the ACC Tournament in March 2008 but was eliminated by Maryland in the next game by a 93–81 margin. The team wrapped up the 2007–08 season with a second-round elimination in the Women's National Invitation Tournament (WNIT) in Queens, N.Y.

In her junior year, Brown finished the season as the team's fourth-leading scorer having played in 35 games, 30 of which she started. She averaged 24.5 minutes, 6.5 points and 4.5 rebounds a game. The Lady Eagles ended the season at 23–12 overall after losing to Florida State in the second round of the ACC Tournament on March 6, 2009. BC went on to make the final round of the WNIT, where the Lady Eagles lost to South Florida 82–65.

Brown has been recognized for her basketball talents by Sports Illustrated Magazine, as she was featured as the magazine's "Intern of the Week" in June 2008 for her wide array of activities in addition to her hoop skills. She was also featured as WCVB-TV's "High 5" high school athlete of the week and has been profiled by New England Sports Network (NESN) on its staple program SportsDesk.

== Boston College statistics ==
Legend
GP	Games played	GS	Games started	MPG	Minutes per game
FG%	Field goal percentage	3P%	3-point field goal percentage	FT%	Free throw percentage
RPG	Rebounds per game	APG	Assists per game	SPG	Steals per game
BPG	Blocks per game	PPG	Points per game	**Bold**	Career high

Year	Team	GP	Points	FG%	3P%	FT%	RPG	APG	SPG	BPG	PPG
2006-07	Boston College	28	226	**45.1**	25.0	58.9	**5.9**	1.3	1.1	0.3	**8.1**
2007-08	Boston College	33	**240**	39.0	**26.5**	58.2	5.5	**2.5**	**1.3**	0.3	7.3
2008-09	Boston College	**35**	228	40.6	22.2	63.2	4.5	2.2	0.7	0.2	6.5
2009-10	Boston College	32	186	36.5	25.0	**74.1**	5.0	1.6	0.8	**0.5**	5.8
Career	Boston College	128	880	40.3	25.0	63.2	5.2	1.9	1.0	0.3	6.9

== Post-American Idol ==
Following her departure from Idol, Brown made hundreds of personal appearances in 2006, most covered by local or national media and drawing as many as 500 to 2,000 or more fans. She appeared at the Kiss 108 Concert in Mansfield, Massachusetts in front of 20,000 people on May 20, performing four songs in addition to introducing Natasha Bedingfield. Brown sang "The Star-Spangled Banner" on July 4 with the Boston Pops in front of hundreds of thousands of people. Brown's performance featured an F-16 flyover and was televised live by WBZ-TV, Boston's CBS affiliate. Brown sang the anthem at Fenway Park on July 12 and also performed six shows over three days at the Eastern States Exposition ("The Big E") in West Springfield, Massachusetts from September 15–17.

Brown was asked once again to perform with the Boston Pops at Conte Forum in Chestnut Hill, Massachusetts on September 29, where they performed a full orchestrated version of her title track "Forward" as part of Boston College's parents' weekend celebration. Brown was also featured in the November 2006 issue of American Idol Magazine.

In 2007, Brown appeared at many events including the annual St. Patrick's Day Breakfast in South Boston on March 18 and the Crocker Field Sunset Concert Series on September 16 in Fitchburg, Massachusetts.

Brown performed alongside veteran record producer David Foster at the "David Foster and Friends" tour when it stopped in Boston on October 25, 2009. Brown sang the disco hit "Got to Be Real" while accompanied by Foster at the concert, which took place at Boston University's Agganis Arena. She returned to the stage to close out the show with other guest performers for the finale of "America's Song".

=== Massachusetts Down Syndrome Congress ===
Since 2009, Brown has annually performed for the Massachusetts Down Syndrome Congress's Buddy Walk & Family Picnic at Lake Quannapowitt in Wakefield, Massachusetts. In 2011, backed by pre-recorded music, she sang "Ain't Leaving (Anything Here)" and other songs from Ayla Brown, Circles and Forward. In 2012, Brown would return with a five-piece band.

=== Forward ===
Brown's debut album, Forward, was released on October 17, 2006. The album was recorded in New York at Tonic Studios, Raw Sugar Studios in Pawling, N.Y., and Double Deal Studios in Chappaqua, N.Y. The tracks were mixed at A-Pawling Studios by Peter Moshay. Brown began recording the vocals for the album immediately after signing her contract on August 24, and in just over a week, the recording sessions were completed. The reason for the hurried recording schedule was that Brown had to meet NCAA compliance deadlines and finish recording her album before beginning her career at Boston College.

The title track, "Forward", received airplay at Mainstream Adult Contemporary (AC) radio. It peaked at number 34 on Billboard's AC chart. The album sold 3,000 copies, placing Brown in 23rd place for American Idol alumni un-certified album sales.

=== Ayla Brown Live! ===
On Tuesday, September 8, 2009, an eight-minute video consisting of concert and behind-the-scenes footage from a live show Brown performed at with "The James Montgomery Blues Band" and "The Uptown Horns" earlier in the summer was posted on Brown's record label's official YouTube channel. In the video, it was revealed that Brown's next release would be titled Ayla Brown Live! and would be a collection of live tracks performed with the two bands at the concert profiled in the video. It was also stated that Brown's next studio album, Circles, was scheduled for an April 6, 2010, release date, which was roughly one month after her career with the Boston College Lady Eagles was set to conclude. A tour that would coincide with the releases was also announced.

=== Circles – EP ===
Following her father's victory in the 2010 Massachusetts special senate election, Brown received a great amount of media attention, which led her label to rush release her new EP Circles in late January. The EP's first single, "Pick It Up", was written by Brown's fellow American Idol semi-finalist Will Makar and Australian singer-songwriter Nathan Leigh Jones. The music video for "Pick It Up" premiered on her label's official YouTube channel on the same day of the release. Brown also appeared on the CBS morning news program The Early Show where she performed "No More" and talked about how her life had changed since her father's win. Ayla also performed the single "Pick It Up" on Fox and Friends on February 15, 2010.

On June 16, 2010, it was revealed that Brown was released from her contract with Double Deal Brand Records.

=== Overseas tours ===
In 2010, Brown had the opportunity to travel overseas to as part of Outback Steakhouse's "Feeding Freedom" tour and performed for two weeks in Afghanistan. In November 2010, Brown visited Camp Leatherneck, Afghanistan, where she entertained 15,000 troops.

=== Ayla Brown ===
In early 2011, Brown moved from Boston to Nashville to pursue a career in country music. In April, Brown released her first single, "Goodbye for Good", to CDBaby.com. The song was written by Charlie Hutto, Jeremy Johnson, and Travis Thibodaux. Over the course of the year, Brown recorded songs for her debut country album, and released the self-titled CD to iTunes in April 2012. Brown also had physical copies made, which she sold at her concerts and the Philadelphia 76ers home games during the 2012 season, and continued to tour throughout New England and the country promoting her new music.

Brown recorded her album under the record label Ambient Entertainment at Ronnie's Place, country music legend Ronnie Milsap's original studio in Nashville, and co-wrote seven of the nine tracks that appeared on the album. She paired up with respected songwriters including Brennin Hunt and Nicolle Galyon, Billy Montana, Luke Sheets, Kelly Archer and more. In support of the album, Brown opened for numerous country music stars, including Josh Turner, Jason Aldean, Craig Morgan, Loretta Lynn, Tracy Lawrence, The Marshall Tucker Band and Darius Rucker, and she performed live on morning news programs including FOX 17 WZTV's Tennessee Mornings and The 10! Show in Philadelphia.

Brown performed at CMA Music Festival in 2011 and 2012. In 2012, Brown performed at venues such as the Hard Rock Stage, Bridgestone Arena, National Underground and Hotel Indigo, and in 2009 she attended as a correspondent on behalf of Great American Country (GAC) TV.

=== Heroes & Hometowns ===
Heroes and Hometowns is a seven-song EP featuring a studio version of "The Star-Spangled Banner" in addition to all original patriotic-inspired songs. The record was recorded at CURB Studios in Nashville and was produced by Brown. New Balance sponsored the project, and a portion of all CD sales benefit a Massachusetts-based military non-profit called, Hugs for Heroes, Inc. The first single off the CD is "Pride of America".

=== Let Love In ===
On May 5, 2015, Brown released Let Love In, a 13-song LP. The album is Brown's third studio release with her record company, Ambient Entertainment. Let Love In was exclusively sponsored by Texas Roadhouse, and during the partnership, Brown made multiple appearances at various locations and her music was featured in the chain's jukebox playlist. Brown wrote or co-wrote each of the tracks on the album, and was produced by Gus Berry. Following the album's release, Brown embarked on a nationwide tour and released an acoustic video of the title track.

=== Philadelphia 76ers ===
In the fall of 2011, Brown was contacted by Adam Aron, new CEO of the Philadelphia 76ers, and was offered the opportunity to serve as the team's official National Anthem singer and Goodwill Ambassador for all home games played at the Wells Fargo Center during the 2012 season. Throughout the season, performed multiple halftime and pre-game concourse shows with her band consisting of guitarists Paul Allen, Anthony Rankin, Lucas Chamberlain and Avery Coffee, keyboardist Alex Wright, bassist Daniel Faga, and drummer Mike Pietrusko. In spring 2012, Brown's contract was extended through the 2012-13 season.

=== Songs of Love ===
Brown is currently serving as spokesperson for the Songs of Love Foundation an organization that creates free, personalized, original songs to uplift children and teens who are facing tough medical, physical or emotional challenges. She first became involved in Songs of Love in 2010 when she covered the organization in a piece she did for CBS' The Early Show. Brown wrote a song for Hannah Lowe, a six-year-old cancer patient who was featured in the piece, and has since also written a song for Collin Lecey.

=== Other projects ===
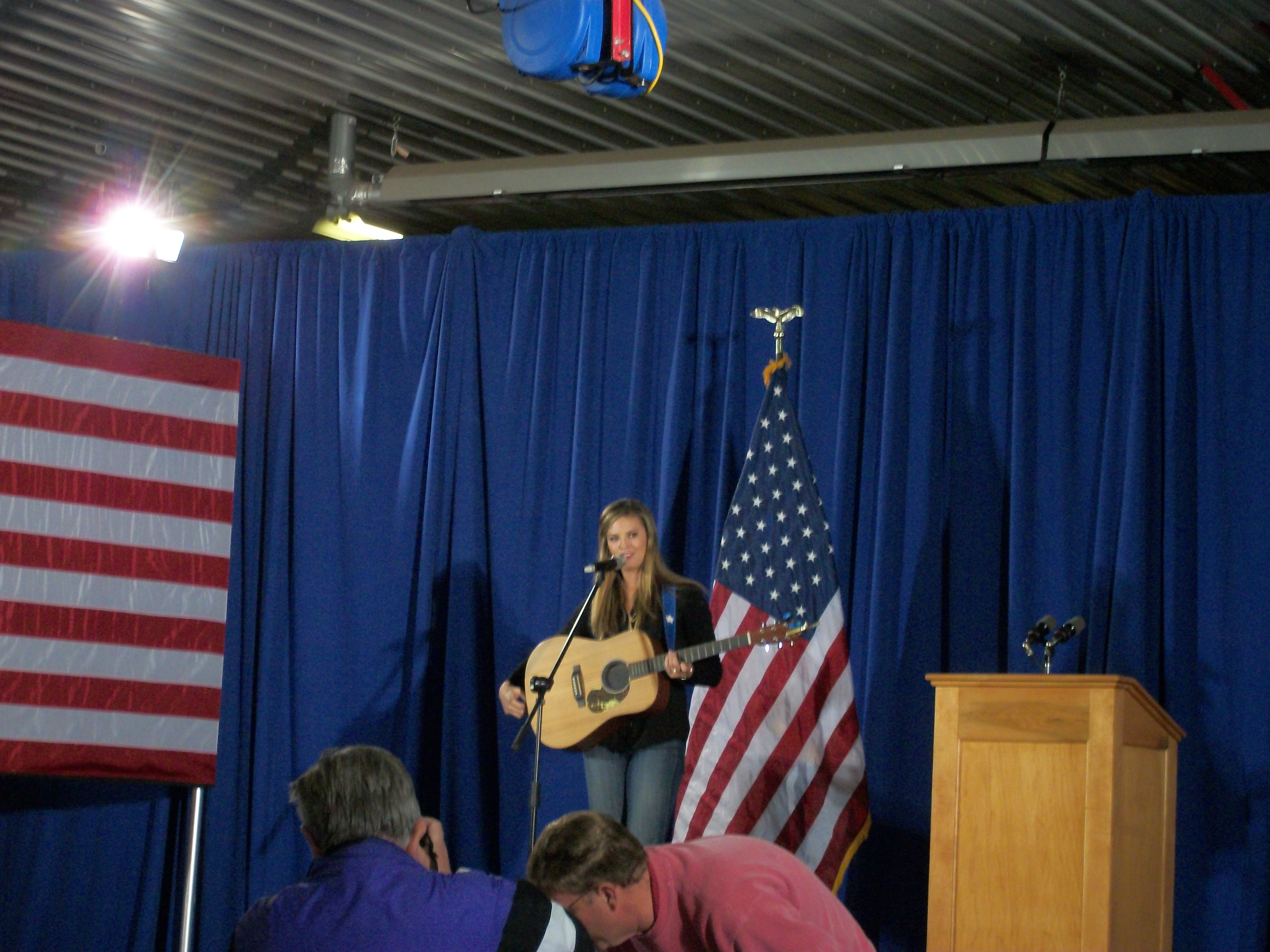
Ayla Brown in Marion, Iowa. in 2014

Brown has also tried her hand at musical theatre. After twice turning down offers to star as the narrator in the Reagle Players' production of the Andrew Lloyd Webber and Tim Rice musical Joseph and the Amazing Technicolor Dreamcoat, Brown finally accepted the role in 2008. From June 12–15 and 19–21, Brown starred in eight shows at the Robinson Theatre in Waltham, Massachusetts, alongside Broadway's Eric Kunze and a host of talented area actors. Of starring in the show, Brown told The Boston Globe she never got to do a musical in high school because she was focused on her basketball career, saying, "I've always wanted to do a musical, and I really regretted not doing one in high school. I was always interested, but basketball always took up all my time."

Brown received much praise for her acting debut, as TheaterMirror.com described her as being "beautiful and statuesque" and that she "has a fantastic soprano voice which soars in all her numbers including the Prologue, Poor Poor Joseph and Go, Go Joseph." The Daily News Tribune voiced similar praise: "It's hard to take your eyes off Brown in this show. She's a beautiful, tall, willowy girl who has an appealing stage presence and a lovely way of exchanging glances and flirtations with other characters on the set."

Brown sang "The Star-Spangled Banner" at the 2012 Republican National Convention at the Tampa Bay Times Forum in Tampa, Florida. On December 15, 2015, she sang "God Bless America" before the undercard Republican debate and "The Star-Spangled Banner" before the primetime Republican debate. On April 6, 2025, Brown also sang "The Star-Spangled Banner" before the 2025 NCAA Division I women's basketball championship game, also at Amalie Arena in Tampa, Florida.

== Discography ==
=== Albums ===
Information
Forward
- Released: October 17, 2006
- Label: Double Deal Brand
- Charts: N/A
- U.S. sales: 3,000
Ayla Brown Live!
- Released: November 10, 2009
- Label: Double Deal Brand
- Charts: N/A
- U.S. sales: N/A
Circles – EP
- Released: January 26, 2010
- Label: Double Deal Brand
- Charts: N/A
- U.S. sales: N/A
Ayla Brown
- Released: April 1, 2012
- Label: Ambient Entertainment
- Charts: N/A
- U.S. sales: N/A
Heroes & Hometowns
- Released: November 27, 2012
- Label: Ambient Entertainment
- Charts: N/A
- U.S. sales: N/A
Let Love In
- Released: May 5, 2015
- Label: Ambient Entertainment
- Charts: N/A
- U.S. sales: N/A

=== Singles ===
Year	Title	US AC	Album
2006	"Know You Better"	—	Forward
2006	"I Quit"	—	Forward
2007	"Forward"	34	Forward
2007	"Falling Into You"	—	Forward
2010	"Pick It Up"	—	Circles – EP
2011	"Goodbye For Good"	—	Ayla Brown
2012	"Pride of America"	—	Heroes & Hometowns
2015	"Let Love In"	—	Let Love In
