= List of historic places in Regional Municipality of Niagara =

This is a list of historic places in Regional Municipality of Niagara, Ontario, containing heritage sites listed on the Canadian Register of Historic Places (CRHP), all of which are designated as historic places either locally, provincially, territorially, nationally, or by more than one level of government.

== List of historic places ==
Name	Address	Coordinates	Government recognition (CRHP №)	Wikidata ID	Image
36 Concession Road	36 Concession; Fort Erie ON	42°53′58″N 78°55′31″W	Fort Erie municipality (16358)		Upload Photo
202 Dufferin Street	202 Dufferin Street; Fort Erie ON	42°55′50″N 78°55′09″W	Fort Erie municipality (15922)		Upload Photo
Fort Erie National Historic Site of Canada	350 Lakeshore Road; Fort Erie ON	42°53′36″N 78°55′26″W	Federal (12103)		More images
Frenchman's Creek National Historic Site of Canada	Niagara River Parkway; Fort Erie ON	42°55′35″N 78°56′32″W	Federal (13036)		More images
The Kraft House	3347 Bowen; Fort Erie ON	42°56′00″N 79°02′33″W	Fort Erie municipality (16344)		Upload Photo
Point Abino Light Tower National Historic Site of Canada	Point Abino Road; Fort Erie (Crystal Beach) ON	42°50′08″N 79°05′43″W	Federal (12102)		More images
Ridgeway Battlefield National Historic Site of Canada	Garrison Road (Highway 3); Fort Erie ON	42°54′14″N 79°02′31″W	Federal (16025)		More images
Smith-Geddes House	390 Main Street West; Grimsby ON	43°11′43″N 79°36′04″W	Ontario (10572)		Upload Photo
Alexander-Robinson House	3289 St. Paul Avenue; Niagara Falls ON	43°08′38″N 79°06′04″W	Niagara Falls municipality (9748)		More images
Bampfield Hall	4761 Zimmerman Avenue; Niagara Falls ON	43°06′18″N 79°03′44″W	Niagara Falls municipality (9865)		More images
Battle of Chippawa National Historic Site of Canada	south of the town of Chippawa on the west side of the Niagara River Parkway; Niagara Falls ON	43°03′10″N 79°01′27″W	Federal (12972)		More images
Battle of Lundy's Lane National Historic Site of Canada	Four-block area of town; marker in Drummond Hill Cemetery; Niagara Falls ON	43°05′21″N 79°05′45″W	Federal (12081)		More images
Buchner House	6172 Buchner Place; Niagara Falls ON	43°05′19″N 79°05′51″W	Niagara Falls municipality (9749)		More images
Chippawa Town Hall	8196 Cummington Square; Niagara Falls ON	43°03′34″N 79°03′02″W	Niagara Falls municipality (9750)		More images
Church Residence	3000 Portage Road; Niagara Falls ON	43°07′49″N 79°05′51″W	Niagara Falls municipality (9752)		More images
Copper Beech Tree	6110 Lundy's Lane; Niagara Falls ON	43°05′23″N 79°05′45″W	Niagara Falls municipality (9753)		More images
Cummington Square	8191 Cummington; Niagara Falls ON	43°03′34″N 79°03′02″W	Niagara Falls municipality (9754)		More images
Danner-Sherk House	12549 Niagara River Parkway; Niagara Falls ON	43°00′01″N 79°01′44″W	Niagara Falls municipality (9755)		
Doran-Marshall Residence	4851 River Road; Niagara Falls ON	43°06′14″N 79°03′44″W	Niagara Falls municipality (9757)		More images
Egerton Morden House	6145 Corwin Avenue; Niagara Falls ON	43°05′02″N 79°06′30″W	Niagara Falls municipality (9759)		More images
First Bampfield House	4325 Bampfield Street; Niagara Falls ON	43°06′06″N 79°03′51″W	Niagara Falls municipality (9760)		More images
Fralick's Tavern	6137 Lundy's Lane; Niagara Falls ON	43°05′23″N 79°05′47″W	Niagara Falls municipality (9761)		More images
Glenview Mansion	4223 Terrace; Niagara Falls ON	43°06′44″N 79°03′49″W	Niagara Falls municipality (9762)		More images
Holy Trinity Church	7820 Portage Road; Niagara Falls ON	43°03′45″N 79°03′26″W	Niagara Falls municipality (9763)		More images
J. Ingles House	6151 Culp Street; Niagara Falls ON	43°05′10″N 79°05′47″W	Niagara Falls municipality (9774)		More images
John Thomson Jr. House	4891 Portage Road; Niagara Falls ON	43°06′13″N 79°05′35″W	Niagara Falls municipality (9775)		More images
Laura Secord House	3800 Bridgewater Street; Niagara Falls ON	43°03′31″N 79°03′08″W	Niagara Falls municipality (9866)		More images
Lyon's Creek Church	7906 Schisler Road; Niagara Falls ON	43°00′12″N 79°07′39″W	Niagara Falls municipality (9776)		More images
Mitchell Cottage	3360 St. Patrick Avenue; Niagara Falls ON	43°07′47″N 79°06′06″W	Niagara Falls municipality (9777)		More images
Nathaniel Dett Chapel	5674 Peer; Niagara Falls ON	43°05′16″N 79°05′18″W	Niagara Falls municipality (9778)		More images
Navy Island National Historic Site of Canada	Niagara Parkway; Niagara Falls ON	43°03′23″N 79°00′42″W	Federal (16122)		More images
Niagara Falls Armoury	5049 Victoria Avenue; Niagara Falls ON	43°06′04″N 79°04′26″W	Federal (4347), Niagara Falls municipality (9870)		More images
Niagara Falls Carnegie Library	5017 Victoria Avenue; Niagara Falls ON	43°06′06″N 79°04′24″W	Niagara Falls municipality (9744)		More images
Old Imperial Bank	4190 Bridge Street; Niagara Falls ON	43°06′31″N 79°03′42″W	Niagara Falls municipality (9782)		More images
Old St. John's Anglican	3394 Portage Road; Niagara Falls ON	43°07′25″N 79°05′57″W	Niagara Falls municipality (9785)		More images
Old St. John's Anglican Church (Stamford)	3428 Portage Road; Niagara Falls ON	43°07′25″N 79°05′57″W	Ontario (10543)		More images
Old Stamford Town Hall	5810 Ferry Street; Niagara Falls ON	43°05′22″N 79°05′28″W	Niagara Falls municipality (9787)		More images
Orchard Cadham House	6023 Culp Street; Niagara Falls ON	43°05′10″N 79°05′39″W	Niagara Falls municipality (9788)		More images
Oswald House	2922 St. Paul Avenue; Niagara Falls ON	43°08′42″N 79°06′03″W	Niagara Falls municipality (9789)		More images
Post Office and Customs House	4177 Park Street; Niagara Falls ON	43°06′28″N 79°03′42″W	Niagara Falls municipality (9791)		More images
R. Nathaniel Dett British Methodist Episcopal Church National Historic Site of Canada	5674 Peer Street; Niagara Falls ON	43°05′16″N 79°05′19″W	Federal (13333)		More images
Russell Cottage	3174 St. Patrick; Niagara Falls ON	43°07′36″N 79°06′05″W	Niagara Falls municipality (9790)		More images
Toronto Power Generating Station National Historic Site of Canada	Niagara Parkway; Niagara Falls ON	43°04′18″N 79°04′26″W	Federal (11954)		More images
Via Railway Station	4267 Bridge Street; Niagara Falls ON	43°06′31″N 79°03′46″W	Federal (4624), Niagara Falls municipality (9792)		More images
Whirlpool House	3011 Portage Road; Niagara Falls ON	43°07′48″N 79°05′54″W	Niagara Falls municipality (9793)		More images
Willoughby Township Hall	11211 Sodom Road; Niagara Falls ON	43°00′57″N 79°03′32″W	Niagara Falls municipality (9794)		More images
Battlefield of Fort George National Historic Site of Canada	Queen Street; Niagara-on-the-Lake ON	43°15′18″N 79°06′29″W	Federal (15905)		More images
Fort George National Historic Site of Canada	Queen's Parade Road; Niagara-on-the-Lake ON	43°14′55″N 79°03′40″W	Federal (7613)		More images
Blockhouse 1	Fort George; Niagara-on-the-Lake ON	43°14′52″N 79°03′44″W	Federal (4798)		Upload Photo
Blockhouse 2	Fort George; Niagara-on-the-Lake ON	43°15′03″N 79°03′40″W	Federal (4799)		More images
Blockhouse 3	Fort George; Niagara-on-the-Lake ON	43°15′03″N 79°03′41″W	Federal (4800)		More images
Brock's Monument	Queenston Heights National Historic Site of Canada; Niagara-on-the-Lake ON	43°09′36″N 79°03′11″W	Federal (9813)		More images
Butler's Barracks National Historic Site of Canada	Queen's Parade; Niagara-on-the-Lake ON	43°14′51″N 79°04′07″W	Federal (7824)		Upload Photo
Commissariat Storehouse	Queen's Parade; Niagara-on-the-Lake ON	43°14′51″N 79°04′10″W	Federal (4814)		Upload Photo
Eagleson-Buyers House	433 Regent; Niagara-on-the-Lake ON	43°15′01″N 79°04′38″W	Niagara-on-the-Lake municipality (16355)		
Field House	15284 Niagara River Parkway; Niagara-on-the-Lake ON	43°12′07″N 79°03′24″W	Ontario (9635)		
Fort Drummond National Historic Site of Canada	Fort Drummond; Niagara-on-the-Lake ON	43°09′35″N 79°03′11″W	Federal (14547)		Upload Photo
Fort George National Historic Site, Artificer’s and Blacksmith Shop	Fort George; Niagara-on-the-Lake ON	43°14′52″N 79°03′44″W	Federal (4803)		Upload Photo
Fort Mississauga National Historic Site of Canada	223 Queen Street; Niagara-on-the-Lake ON	43°15′39″N 79°04′43″W	Federal (7616)		More images
Guardhouse / Orderly Room	Fort George; Niagara-on-the-Lake ON	43°14′52″N 79°03′44″W	Federal (4810)		Upload Photo
Gunshed	Queen's Parade, Butler's Barracks; Niagara-on-the-Lake ON	43°14′51″N 79°04′10″W	Federal (4815)		Upload Photo
Junior Commissariat Officer's Quarters	Butler's Barracks; Niagara-on-the-Lake ON	43°14′57″N 79°04′25″W	Federal (9950)		Upload Photo
Lockhart-Moogk House	289 Simcoe; Niagara-on-the-Lake ON	43°15′21″N 79°04′44″W	Niagara-on-the-Lake municipality (15927)		More images
McDougal-Harrison House	165 Queen; 100px ON	43°15′27″N 79°04′34″W	100px municipality (14508)		Upload Photo
Men's Two-Storey Barracks	Butler's Barracks; Niagara-on-the-Lake ON	43°14′52″N 79°04′28″W	Federal (9949)		Upload Photo
Mississauga Point Lighthouse National Historic Site of Canada	Fort Mississauga; Niagara-on-the-Lake ON	43°15′41″N 79°04′37″W	Federal (12012)		
Moore-Bishop-Stokes House	244 King; Niagara-on-the-Lake ON	43°15′14″N 79°04′18″W	Niagara-on-the-Lake municipality (15833)		
Navy Hall	Fort George; Niagara-on-the-Lake ON	43°14′52″N 79°03′44″W	Federal (4759)		More images
Niagara Apothecary National Historic Site of Canada	5 Queen Street; Niagara-on-the-Lake ON	43°15′18″N 79°04′16″W	Federal (9169), Ontario (10540)		More images
Niagara District Court House	26 Queen Street; Niagara-on-the-Lake ON	43°15′17″N 79°04′17″W	Federal (10406), Ontario (8181)		More images
Niagara Historical Society Museum	43 Castlereagh Street; Niagara-on-the-Lake ON	43°15′07″N 79°04′18″W	Niagara-on-the-Lake municipality (16187)		More images
Niagara-on-the-Lake National Historic Site of Canada	District covering 25 city blocks; includes more than 90 residential, commercial, ecclesiastical and institutional buildings constructed between 1815 and 1859; Niagara-on-the-Lake ON	43°15′17″N 79°04′15″W	Federal (14623)		
Octagonal Blockhouse	Fort George; Niagara-on-the-Lake ON	43°14′52″N 79°03′44″W	Federal (4802)		More images
Officers' Kitchen	Fort George; Niagara-on-the-Lake ON	43°14′51″N 79°03′44″W	Federal (4806)		More images
Officers' Quarters	Fort George; Niagara-on-the-Lake ON	43°14′52″N 79°03′44″W	Federal (4808)		Upload Photo
Powder Magazine	Fort George; Niagara-on-the-Lake ON	43°15′03″N 79°03′41″W	Federal (10730)		Upload Photo
Powder Magazines	Fort Mississauga; Niagara-on-the-Lake ON	43°15′41″N 79°04′37″W	Federal (10134)		More images
Powell-Wisch House	433 King; Niagara-on-the-Lake ON	43°15′00″N 79°04′32″W	Niagara-on-the-Lake municipality (16186)		Upload Photo
Queenston-Chippawa Hydro-Electric Development National Historic Site of Canada	Niagara-on-the-Lake (Queenston) ON	43°08′47″N 79°02′41″W	Federal (17706)		More images
Queenston Heights National Historic Site of Canada	Niagara Parkway at Portage Road; Niagara-on-the-Lake (Queenston) ON	43°09′36″N 79°03′10″W	Federal (7677)		More images
Secord Mill	137 Four Mile Creek; Niagara-on-the-Lake ON	43°09′09″N 79°06′15″W	Niagara-on-the-Lake municipality (16359)		More images
Tower	Fort Mississauga; Niagara-on-the-Lake ON	43°15′42″N 79°04′37″W	Federal (9784)		
Vrooman's Battery National Historic Site of Canada	14759 and 14767 Niagara Parkway; Niagara-on-the-Lake ON	43°09′49″N 79°03′24″W	Federal (17421)		Upload Photo
Willowbank National Historic Site of Canada	14487 Niagara Parkway; Niagara-on-the-Lake ON	43°10′04″N 79°03′39″W	Federal (6426), Ontario (8674)		More images
Augustine House	145 Main Street West; Port Colborne ON	42°54′03″N 79°15′00″W	Port Colborne municipality (8961)		
Humberstone Township Hall	76 Main Street West; Port Colborne ON	42°54′03″N 79°14′52″W	Port Colborne municipality (8964)		
Ingleside	322 King Street; Port Colborne ON	42°53′20″N 79°15′06″W	Port Colborne municipality (9661)		Upload Photo
Ott House	518 King Street; Port Colborne ON	42°54′05″N 79°14′26″W	Port Colborne municipality (8974)		Upload Photo
Reformed Mennonite Meeting House	269 Killaly Street West; Port Colborne ON	42°53′30″N 79°15′39″W	Port Colborne municipality (8976)		
Roselawn	296 Fielden Street; Port Colborne ON	42°53′17″N 79°15′26″W	Federal (12912), Port Colborne municipality (8977)		
St. James Rectory	346 Catharine Street; Port Colborne ON	42°53′19″N 79°15′11″W	Port Colborne municipality (9858)		Upload Photo
Sherkwood	1271 Sherk Road; Port Colborne ON	42°53′48″N 79°10′25″W	Port Colborne municipality (9857)		
Thomas Euphronius Reeb House	380 King Street; Port Colborne ON	42°53′21″N 79°15′06″W	Port Colborne municipality (13244)		Upload Photo
Wildwood	14 Catharine Street; Port Colborne ON	42°52′48″N 79°15′11″W	Port Colborne municipality (9860)		Upload Photo
160-168 St. Paul Street	164 St. Paul Street; St. Catharines ON	43°08′47″N 79°15′26″W	St. Catharines municipality (13492)		Upload Photo
Armoury	81 Lake Street; St. Catharines ON	43°09′47″N 79°15′02″W	Federal (10987)		More images
Brown-Jouppien House	1317 Pelham Road, Short Hills Provincial Park; St. Catharines ON	43°06′31″N 79°17′11″W	St. Catharines municipality (9640)		
Burgoyne Residence	15 Trafalgar Street; St. Catharines ON	43°09′18″N 79°14′52″W	St. Catharines municipality (13493)		Upload Photo
Davella Mills Carillon	480 Queenston Street; St. Catharines ON	43°09′39″N 79°12′16″W	St. Catharines municipality (13494)		More images
Former Foghorn Building	Fort Weller lighthouse station, at the northern terminus of the Welland Canal; St. Catharines ON	42°28′N 81°16′W	Federal (10477)		Upload Photo
Former Lighthouse Keeper's Dwelling	Fort Weller lighthouse station, at the northern terminus of the Welland Canal; St. Catharines ON	43°14′11″N 79°13′08″W	Federal (10486)		Upload Photo
Front Range Lighthouse	Lakeside Park; St. Catharines (Port Dalhousie) ON	43°12′15″N 79°15′58″W	Federal (4743)		More images
Government of Canada Building	32 Church Street; St. Catharines (Port Dalhousie) ON	43°09′32″N 79°14′53″W	Federal (10259)		Upload Photo
Hamilton and Scourge National Historic Site of Canada	at the bottom of Lake Ontario 11 km north of Port Dalhousie; St. Catharines ON	43°18′31″N 79°18′35″W	Federal (14941)		Upload Photo
Keaton Manor	1590 St. Paul Street; St. Catharines ON	43°08′23″N 79°18′08″W	St. Catharines municipality (19850)		Upload Photo
Phelps-Austin House	159 Moffatt Street; St. Catharines ON	43°08′59″N 79°13′26″W	St. Catharines municipality (19845)		Upload Photo
Port Dalhousie Heritage Conservation District	Port Dalhousie peninsula, bordered on the north by Lake Ontario, on the south by Martindale Pond and Twelve Mile Creek, and on the east by the Port Dalhousie Harbour; St. Catharines (Port Dalhousie) ON	43°12′09″N 79°15′59″W	St. Catharines (Port Dalhousie) municipality (8348)		More images
Rear Range Lighttower	East Pier; St. Catharines (Port Dalhousie) ON	43°12′15″N 79°15′58″W	Federal (4745)		More images
Robertson Public School	83 Church Street; St. Catharines ON	43°09′41″N 79°14′43″W	St. Catharines municipality (9802)		Upload Photo
Salem Chapel, British Methodist Episcopal Church National Historic Site of Canada	92 Geneva Street; St. Catharines ON	43°09′54″N 79°14′24″W	Federal (12892)		More images
Search and Rescue Office	Fort Weller lightstation St. Catharines ON	43°14′12″N 79°13′09″W	Federal (11367)		Upload Photo
VIA Rail Station	5 Great Western Avenue; St. Catharines ON	43°08′52″N 79°15′22″W	Federal (4625)		Upload Photo
Wood-Graham-Bacher House	134 Church Street; St. Catharines ON	43°09′48″N 79°14′32″W	St. Catharines municipality (9803)		Upload Photo
Wray's-Dufferin Block-Helliwell Block	122 St. Paul Street; St. Catharines ON	43°09′24″N 79°14′42″W	St. Catharines municipality (9805)		Upload Photo
Allanburg United Church	2364 Centre Street; Thorold ON	43°04′38″N 79°12′31″W	Thorold municipality (8385)		More images
Allanburg Village Cemetery	Centre Street; Thorold ON	43°03′34″N 79°11′57″W	Thorold municipality (9856)		More images
Battle of Beaver Dams National Historic Site of Canada	Davis Road; Thorold ON	43°07′22″N 79°12′06″W	Federal (14602)		
The Beatty House	13 Sullivan Avenue; Thorold ON	43°07′23″N 79°12′14″W	Thorold municipality (18578)		Upload Photo
Beaverdams Methodist Church and Burying Ground	Marlatts Road; Thorold ON	43°06′18″N 79°13′07″W	Thorold municipality (18581)		Upload Photo
Carr-Millar-McMillan Block	31 Front Street South; Thorold ON	43°07′28″N 79°12′03″W	Thorold municipality (11030)		Upload Photo
Flannery House	22 Portland Street; Thorold ON	43°07′16″N 79°11′47″W	Thorold municipality (11025)		Upload Photo
The Grenville House	7 Queen Street; Thorold ON	43°07′28″N 79°12′18″W	Thorold municipality (19839)		Upload Photo
Macartney Drug Store	15 Front Street; Thorold ON	43°07′28″N 79°12′03″W	Thorold municipality (18602)		
Millar House	43 Welland Street South; Thorold ON	43°07′14″N 79°11′47″W	Thorold municipality (8828)		Upload Photo
Munro House	5 Ormond Street South; Thorold ON	43°07′09″N 79°11′57″W	Thorold municipality (14213)		Upload Photo
St. Andrew's Presbyterian Church	24 Clairmont Street; Thorold ON	43°07′26″N 79°11′56″W	Thorold municipality (19797)		
Thorold's Carnegie Library	1 Ormond Street; Thorold ON	43°07′30″N 79°11′56″W	Thorold municipality (18577)		
Welland Mills	east side Pine Street N, between St. David's Street W and Albert Street; Thorold ON	43°07′33″N 79°12′10″W	Thorold municipality (1197)		
Battle of Cook's Mills National Historic Site of Canada	Lyons Creek Road; Welland ON	43°00′02″N 79°10′22″W	Federal (12957)		
Bridgetender's House	44 Merritt Street; Welland ON	42°59′43″N 79°15′27″W	Welland municipality (14842)		Upload Photo
Brookfield-Cupido House	271 Division; Welland ON	42°59′31″N 79°14′35″W	Welland municipality (14843)		Upload Photo
Central Fire Hall	30 Hellems Avenue; Welland ON	42°59′30″N 79°14′48″W	Welland municipality (15310)		
Central United Church (Welland)	88 King Street; Welland ON	42°59′23″N 79°15′03″W	Welland municipality (15311)		Upload Photo
Chaffey-Fennessy House	52 Chaffey Street; Welland ON	42°58′26″N 79°14′39″W	Welland municipality (15312)		Upload Photo
Farmer's Market Building	50 Market Square; Welland ON	42°59′27″N 79°14′56″W	Welland municipality (9659)		Upload Photo
Glasgow-Fortner House	24 Burgar Street; Welland ON	42°59′33″N 79°14′38″W	Welland municipality (15313)		Upload Photo
Gordon-Marshall House	155 Hellems Avenue; Welland ON	42°59′21″N 79°14′48″W	Welland municipality (15315)		Upload Photo
King-Hill House	81 Bald Street; Welland ON	42°59′30″N 79°14′48″W	Welland municipality (19857)		Upload Photo
Lawrence-Singer House	204 East Main Street; Welland ON	42°59′34″N 79°14′42″W	Welland municipality (15344)		Upload Photo
Lobosco-Foote House	103 State Street; Welland ON	42°59′12″N 79°14′57″W	Welland municipality (15309)		Upload Photo
Main Street Bridge	Main Street East; Welland ON	42°59′30″N 79°15′02″W	Welland municipality (15314)		More images
Mizpah Mission/Italian Pentecostal Church	400 King Street; Welland ON	42°59′00″N 79°15′04″W	Welland municipality (15345)		Upload Photo
Vaughan Seed Company	111 Victoria Street; Welland ON	42°59′10″N 79°14′34″W	Welland municipality (15346)		Upload Photo
Welland Court House	102 East Main Street; Welland ON	42°59′33″N 79°14′49″W	Welland municipality (15316)		More images

== See also ==
- List of historic places in Golden Horseshoe
- List of historic places in Ontario
- List of National Historic Sites of Canada in Ontario
