= Halton Herald =

The Halton Herald is a nonprofit newsgroup in Halton Hills, Ontario. The group, composed of volunteers, promotes itself as Halton's only independent news source. It accepts no government funding or private advertisements to maintain its reports.

== Freedom of the press issue ==
The Halton Herald received national notoriety when an Ontario Superior Court judge dismissed a civil action claim launched by The Town of Halton Hills. The Town had attempted to sue The Halton Herald's chief administrator, Al Kerouac, in an attempt to censor the nonprofit group's ability to publish critical reports on the town's administrators and its political board members' activities.

The Halton Herald had published a series of stories regarding the injudicious conduct of Halton Hills Council, as well as publicly criticizing the discriminatory practices of a number of the town's senior administrators.

A Freedom of Information application disclosed that the then Town Chief Administrator, C.A.O. Bob Austin, and Mayor Bonnette sought legal advice from a Town Solicitor who advised council that they could sue the Herald's Chief Administrator, Al Kerouac, for defamation. The Herald's Committee voted to challenge the action, to defend journalists' right to criticize governments without fear of reprisal or threat of litigation.

Ryder Gilliland asserted in a motion to the Ontario Supreme Court, Halton Hills (Town) v. Kerouac, [2006] O.J. No. 1473(Sup.Ct.):

"The Corporation of the Town of Halton Hills is a municipality and, as such, is not entitled to claim for defamation. It is contrary to freedom of expression to allow a democratically elected governmental body a cause of action in defamation. Such a claim would inevitably have a chilling effect on public criticism of elected officials and governmental bodies."

Ontario Superior Court Justice J. Corbett agreed, ordering that "the claim of the Town of Halton Hills be dismissed". He stated,

"The reason for the prohibition of defamation suits by government lies not with the use of taxes, or with some abstruse theory about the indivisibility of the state and the people who make up the state. Rather, it lies in the nature of democracy itself. Governments are accountable to the people through the ballot box, and not to judges and juries in courts of law. When a government is criticized, its recourse is in the public domain, not the courts. The government may not imprison, or fine, or sue, those who criticize it. The government may respond. This is fundamental. Litigation is a form of force, and the government must not silence its critics by force."

Minutes of the Town of Halton Hills Council Meeting held on Monday, September 18, 2006, at 7:05 p.m. in the Town's Council Chamber, section 15-H of the minutes reflected the true sentiments of the community; Councillor M. Davis of the Town of Halton Hills advised that citizens have approached him regarding bullying on this Council and referred to an article titled "Why are bullies admired?". Councillor Davis believes that members of Council need to set an example as this is not an arena. Councillor Davis suggested that the Mayor should discourage this type of behaviour, and read several quotes from the newspaper article such as "the sad truth about bullying is that it achieves your aim to dominate", "they’re more popular than the victims", Councillor Davis also read the following except the decision issued by Justice David Corbett in the Town of Halton Hills vs. Kirouac, "The government may not imprison, or fine, or sue those who criticize it...litigation is a form of force, and the government must not silence the critics by force."
