= Gail J. Brown =

American semiconductor physicist

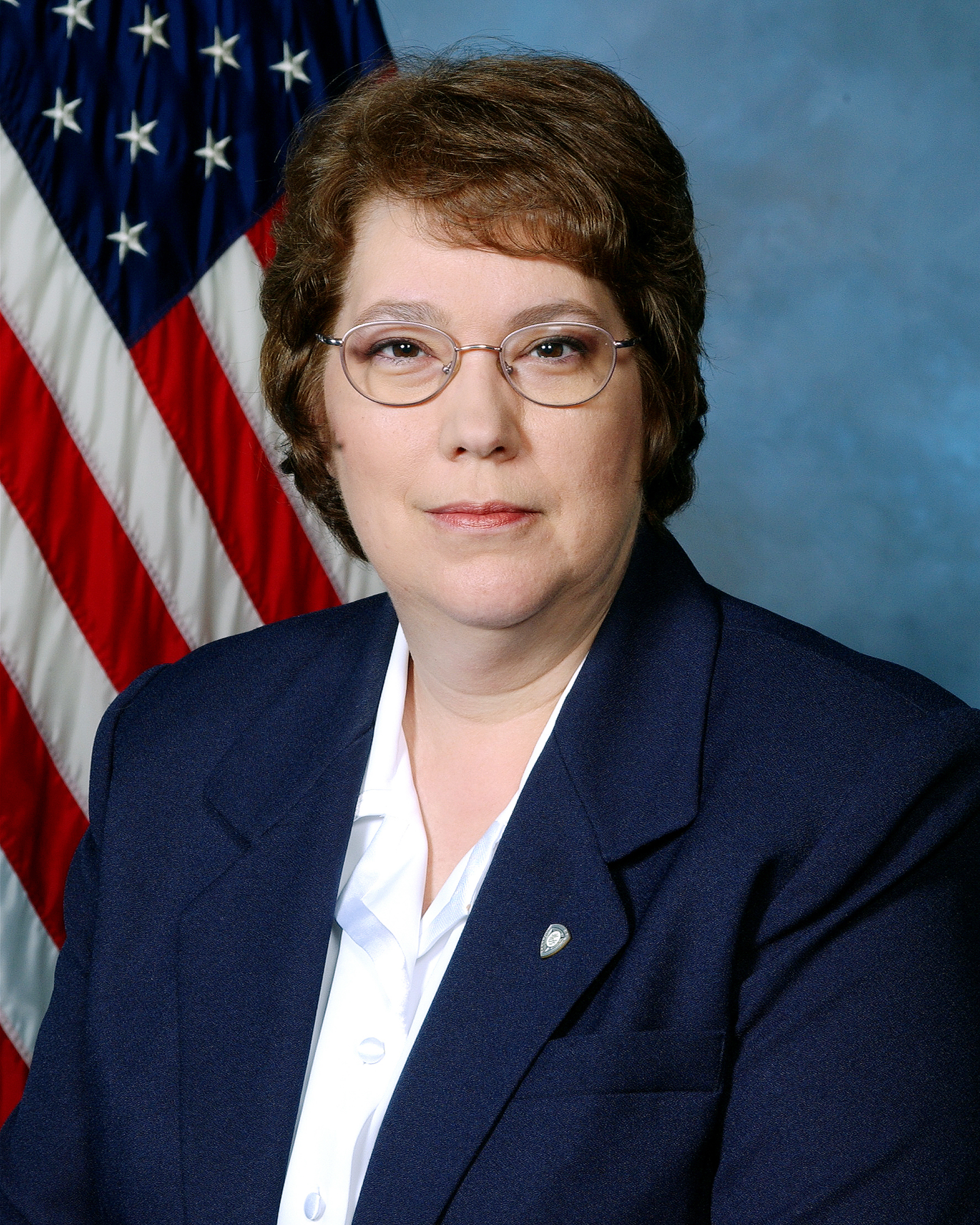
- Brown in 2008
- Education: Wright State University; University of Dayton
- Awards: Meritorious Civilian Service Award (2007)
- Scientific career
- Fields: Physics
- Workplaces: Air Force Research Laboratory

Gail J. Brown is an American semiconductor physicist in the materials and manufacturing directorate of the Air Force Research Laboratory.

== Life ==
Brown earned a B.S. and M.S. from Wright State University and Ph.D. at the University of Dayton.

As of 2008, Brown is a research leader and principal research physicist at the Air Force Research Laboratory in the materials and manufacturing directorate's survivability and sensor materials division, electronic and optical materials branch. She researches semiconductors. Her research contributes to fundamental physics and development of "quantum confined" or "quantum well" semiconductor hetero-structure materials for applications in high-performance infrared detectors. In 2007, Brown received the Meritorious Civilian Service Award for her leadership in coordinating a research project, which involved computational modeling and growth of the superlattice materials to initial device testing of the new materials system. Brown was advisor to the National Research Council and an adjunct professor at the center for quantum devices at Northwestern University.

As of 2008, Brown is a fellow of the International Society for Optical Engineering and the American Physical Society.
