= Gail Huff Brown =

American broadcast journalist

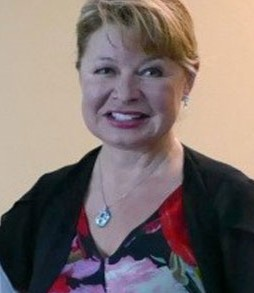
- Born: Gail Huff; February 9, 1962 (age 64); Winterset, Iowa, U.S.
- Education: Bentley University (BA); Emerson College
- Political party: Republican
- Spouse: Scott Brown (m. 1986)
- Children: 2, including Ayla

Gail Huff Brown (née Huff; born February 9, 1962) is an American broadcast journalist. Huff most recently worked as a special correspondent and news contributor for WWJE-DT. Huff also previously worked with WJLA-TV, an ABC station, in Washington, D.C. for several years, after seventeen years for WCVB-TV, the ABC affiliate in Boston, Massachusetts. She is married to former U.S. Ambassador and Senator Scott Brown.

== Early life and education ==
Huff was born in Winterset, Iowa, where her father was a medical doctor, an epidemiologist. In 1978, her family moved to Waltham, Massachusetts. She graduated from Waltham High School in 1980 and attended Bentley University, earning a bachelor degree in business communications. She attended graduate classes at Emerson College before beginning her broadcast career in 1984.

== Career ==
Huff's broadcast journalism career began with Greenville, North Carolina–based WNCT-TV in 1984. In 1986, she joined WLNE-TV in Providence, Rhode Island, as a general assignment reporter. She later held the same position at WFSB-TV, in Hartford, Connecticut in 1989. All three television stations were CBS affiliates.

Huff was employed as a reporter at WCVB-TV starting in 1993, working the 3–10 A.M. shift, while her daughters, Ayla Brown and Arianna, were growing up. During her husband's campaign, Huff stayed away from news assignments that may have affected his election prospects, and never appeared at campaign events until his victory speech on January 20, 2010. She resigned her position at WCVB-TV six months later, citing family considerations. Later that year, she took a position with WJLA-TV in Washington, D.C. On February 28, 2013, she resigned from WJLA-TV, and moved with her husband, to Rye, New Hampshire.

In 2015, Huff joined NH1 News in Concord, New Hampshire, as a special correspondent and news contributor. At NH1 News Huff often completed stories for NH1 News Investigates, one of New Hampshire's leading investigative news teams. Huff also served as an anchor for breaking news and special reports outside of regularly scheduled newscasts for NH1 News. Huff departed journalism in 2017 to support her husband in his role as U.S. ambassador.

=== 2022 congressional campaign ===
In September 2021, Huff declared her candidacy for New Hampshire's 1st congressional district in the 2022 election. She identifies as a conservative Republican. Prior to running for office, Huff supported abortion rights. In 2021, she stated that she is "much more conservative" than her husband, and she supports former President Donald Trump. After filing for her congressional campaign, she was asked about her position on abortion, specifically in relation to the Texas Heartbeat Act, and she replied that she supports the current law in New Hampshire on abortion, which is legal during most of a pregnancy, but supports Texas's and other states' "right to pass any law they want" to restrict abortion." She said her views on abortion are similar to those of Governor Chris Sununu, who is pro-choice. Facing opposition in the primary campaign over abortion, Huff stated that she is a "mix of both" pro-life and pro-choice. She announced that she supports overturning Roe v. Wade and that abortion rights, and the question of whether or not to ban abortions, should be decided on a state level. She released a statement saying, “I’ve made my position on abortion clear: I support states’ rights, and I especially support our law here in New Hampshire. I do not support late-term abortion, federal funding for abortion or foreign aid being used for abortion....” Following the overturning of Roe, she ran an ad saying she will support abortion rights in New Hampshire. In an interview, Huff said that she supports same-sex marriage, but declined to answer whether she believes it should be a state issue and the Supreme Court should overturn the Obergefell decision which legalized same-sex marriage nationally. Huff has made unsubstantiated claims surrounding the 2020 presidential election, saying that there were "a lot of irregularities."

== Personal life ==
At one time, she hosted a parenting series on Lifetime that featured child psychologist Penelope Leach. Huff starred in Boston singer-songwriter Digney Fignus' 1984 music video for the song "The Girl With The Curious Hand".

Huff is a fitness enthusiast who in 2007 took a fitness challenge with Navy SEAL applicants. She is an avid cyclist.
