= Forward (Ayla Brown album) =

Studio album by Ayla Brown
- Released: October 17, 2006
- Recorded: New York, New York (August - September 2006)
- Genre: Pop
- Length: 42:25
- Label: Double Deal Brand
- Producer: Jim McGregor

Forward is the debut album of singer Ayla Brown, which was released on October 17, 2006.

The album was recorded in New York City, at Tonic Studios, Raw Sugar Studios and Double Deal Studios, and mixed at A-Pawling Studios by Peter Moshay, of Hall & Oates, and Mariah Carey fame. On August 25, as soon as Ayla was legally able, she raced to New York to record the 11 tracks of her debut album, with producer Jim McGregor of Double Deal Records, (founded by Wayne Laakko). One week later, it was finished.

There was speculation that the record company rushed this out to beat Taylor Hicks and Katharine McPhee to the punch, but the record needed to be finished prior to Ayla's college enrollment to meet certain NCAA compliance & eligibility requirements.

The first single to be released was a double release of "Know You Better" and "I Quit", which was released on September 12, 2006.

== Track listing ==
1. "Know You Better"
2. "If I Was A River"
3. "Sugah"
4. "I Quit"
5. "Forward"
6. "Breaking Away"
7. "Falling Into You"
8. "Miles Away"
9. "Thanks To You"
10. "Ten Cent Wings"
11. "Forward (Unplugged)"
