= The New Tanner =

Weekly newspaper in Acton, Ontario, Canada

- Type: Weekly newspaper
- Founder(s): Paul Nolan
- Founded: 1992
- Language: English
- Ceased publication: 2020
- Headquarters: 373 Queen Street
- City: Acton, Ontario
- Circulation: 10,000 (as of 2020)

The New Tanner was a weekly newspaper published in Acton, Ontario, Canada, from 1992 to 2020.

== History ==
Paul Nolan, the founding publisher of The Acton Tanner, began publishing at 7 Mill Street East in downtown Acton, moving to 12 Church Street East within two years. Nolan’s family came from Glendalough in County Wicklow, Ireland, and Paul had an early taste of newspaper fame. The future publisher had appearances in the Acton Free Press in 1969 on his first day of school, and in 1972 for winning prizes at two fairs. A high school valedictorian, by 18 he was a sports section editor of the Free Press. Two years later in 1985 he was publishing the weekly Acton Voice, and purchased The Standardbred News in 1988, a biweekly journal for harness horseracing and breeding.

“It’s never easy. It’s never over. There is no finish line. You’re only as good as your last issue.”

— Paul Nolan, Founding publisher, 1st anniversary issue (1993: May 26th, page 6)

For the first three weeks of its existence the Acton Tanner was distributed freely to residents, its colourful masthead a bright blue that would rotate with other eye-catching colours over time. A Tuesday publishing schedule soon became Wednesdays, charging 60 cents for a 16-20 page issue or $26.40 per annum. Local events would be filed under The Grape Vine, and Constable [Bill] Riddle’s Corner featured safety tips, later being written by Constable Gerry George. Nolan himself wrote many articles, along with Frances Niblock as editor and Pat Giguere covering a seniors column. A paper-within-a-paper would appear as well, the Rockwood Miller. The Tanner gave more focus to local Acton information, with Nolan going so far as to butt heads with the Acton town council members. He felt the awarding of the annual advertising contract to The Georgetown Independent-Acton Free Press was “flawed in its logic”, and the council should be supporting the community newspaper, more widely read by locals than the broader, merged papers. There was chafing at the lumping in of Acton with Georgetown. Nolan’s editorials ranged from congratulating local sports teams, himself an avid soccer and hockey player, to calling out suspicious political dealings. This included a scathing article on Halton North N.D.P. MPP Noel Duignan, and his alleged “eight-page propaganda piece, camouflaged as a hometown tabloid newspaper, and promoting itself as the newsletter of the community.”

The Tanner had been suffering financial troubles due to delinquent payments by advertisers, leading to a six month shutdown of the paper in May 1997. The New Tanner would be up and running on January 29, 1998, from the old Dills (of the Acton Free Press) Printing and Publishing Building on Willow Street North. The paper eventually settled at 373 Queen Street East, where New Tanner Publishing exists today. Although Nolan was still heavily involved in the paper, changes were abound. The new publisher was Ted Tyler Jr., issues were coming out on Thursdays, and it had become a free publication again. Ted Tyler’s father, Ted Sr., was Mayor of Acton from 1945-1957, and Ted Jr. was very active in the community. He owned Tyler Air, Tyler Transport Ltd. and a Radio Shack. He won Citizen of the Year in 1982, and was a longtime member of the Acton Heritage Committee, leading the old Town Hall restoration.

In 1998, the paper was renamed to The New Tanner.

The last edition of the paper was published on March 19, 2020.

== See also ==
- List of newspapers in Canada
