= Boston Presbyterian Church =

Boston Presbyterian Church (Milton, Ontario)
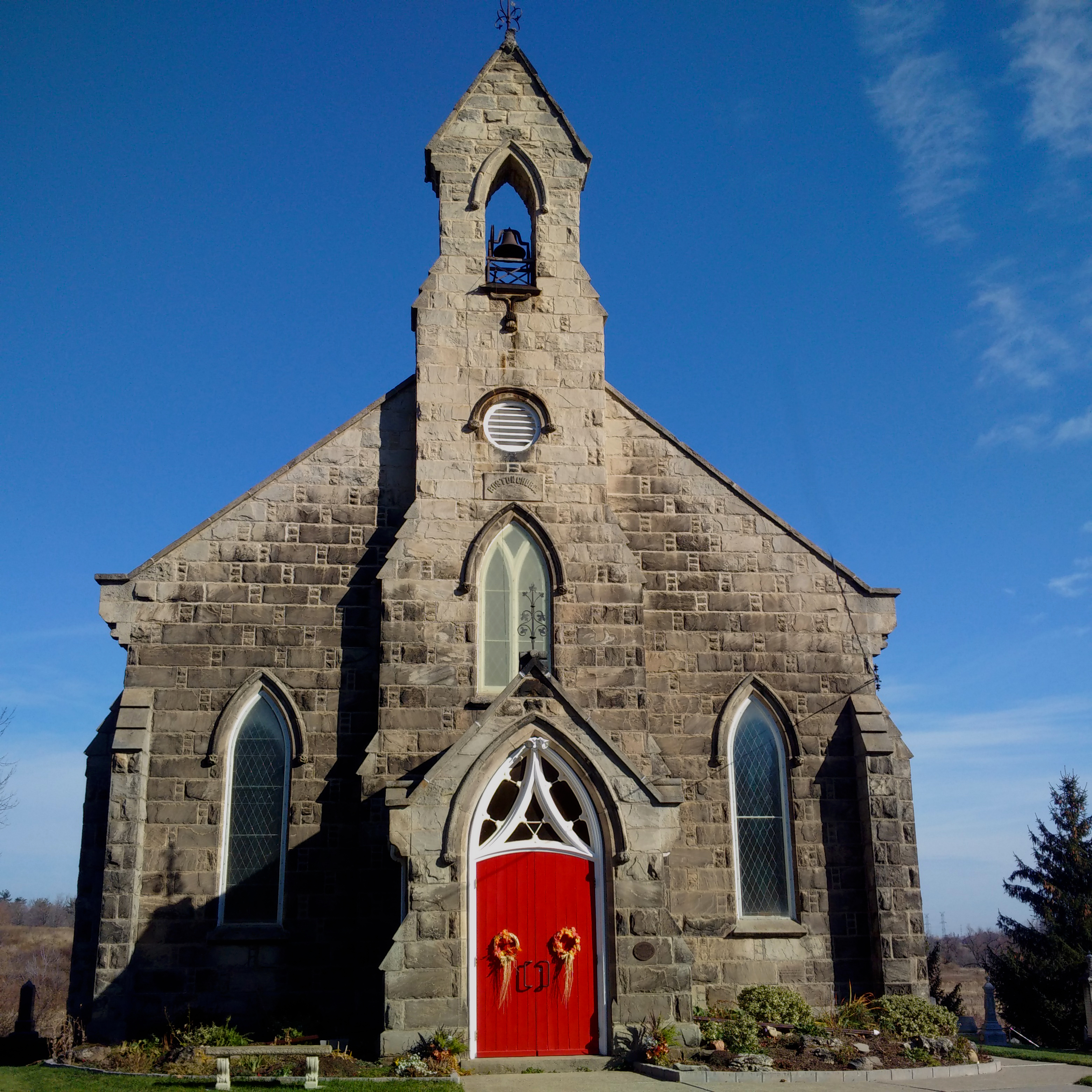
- Boston Presbyterian Church (Milton, Ontario)
- Boston Presbyterian Church (Milton, Ontario)
- 43°33′13″N 79°54′57″W
- Denomination: Presbyterian Church in Canada
- Website: Boston Presbyterian Church

History
- Dedication: 1868

Boston Presbyterian Church is a Presbyterian church in Scotch Block of Halton Hills, Ontario, Canada. Services have been held in the area known as Scotch Block since 1820. It was in 1824 that a parcel of land was purchased from Andrew Laidlaw, sufficient in size for a burying ground and a house of worship. Construction began in 1825 and was completed in 1835. The first minister, Rev. Peter Ferguson, was inducted April 11, 1832.

The church is named for Thomas Boston.

== Construction history ==
The cornerstone for the present stone church was laid in 1868 from the local limestone quarry. The first service in the new building was held in January 1879. Further additions were completed in 1960 with the construction of a basement hall under the sanctuary, a church parlour and classrooms were added to the rear of the church.

The church is in the Gothic Revival style designed by James Avon Smith RCA. It was built by Charles Blackwell, Thomas Henderson and congregation volunteers from Esquessing's Scotch Block.

The church was listed as a property of historic and architectural value or interest under Part IV of the Ontario Heritage Act in Halton Hills on May 8, 1995.

== Images ==
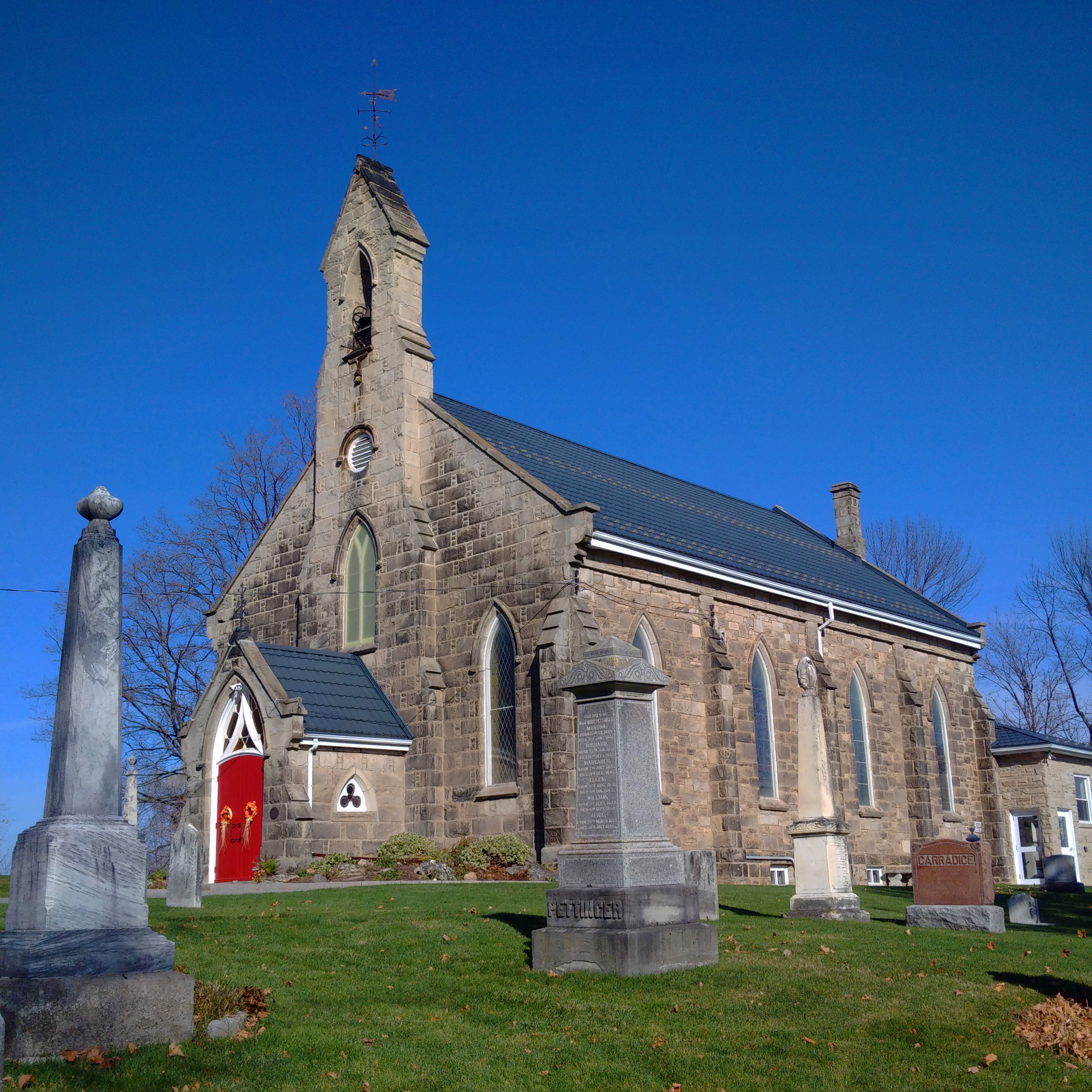
Boston Cemetery and Church

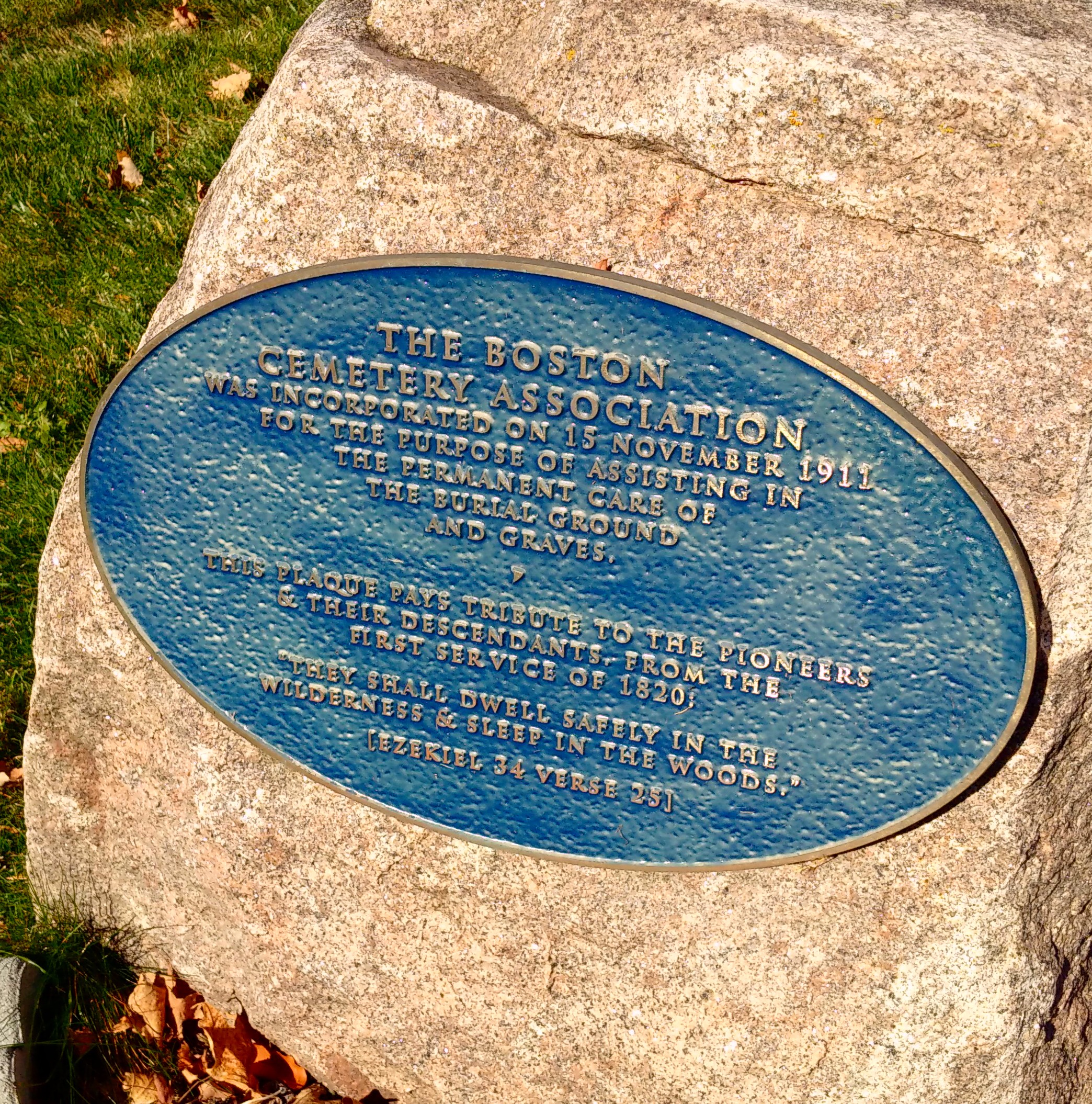
Boston Church Cemetery Historic Plaque

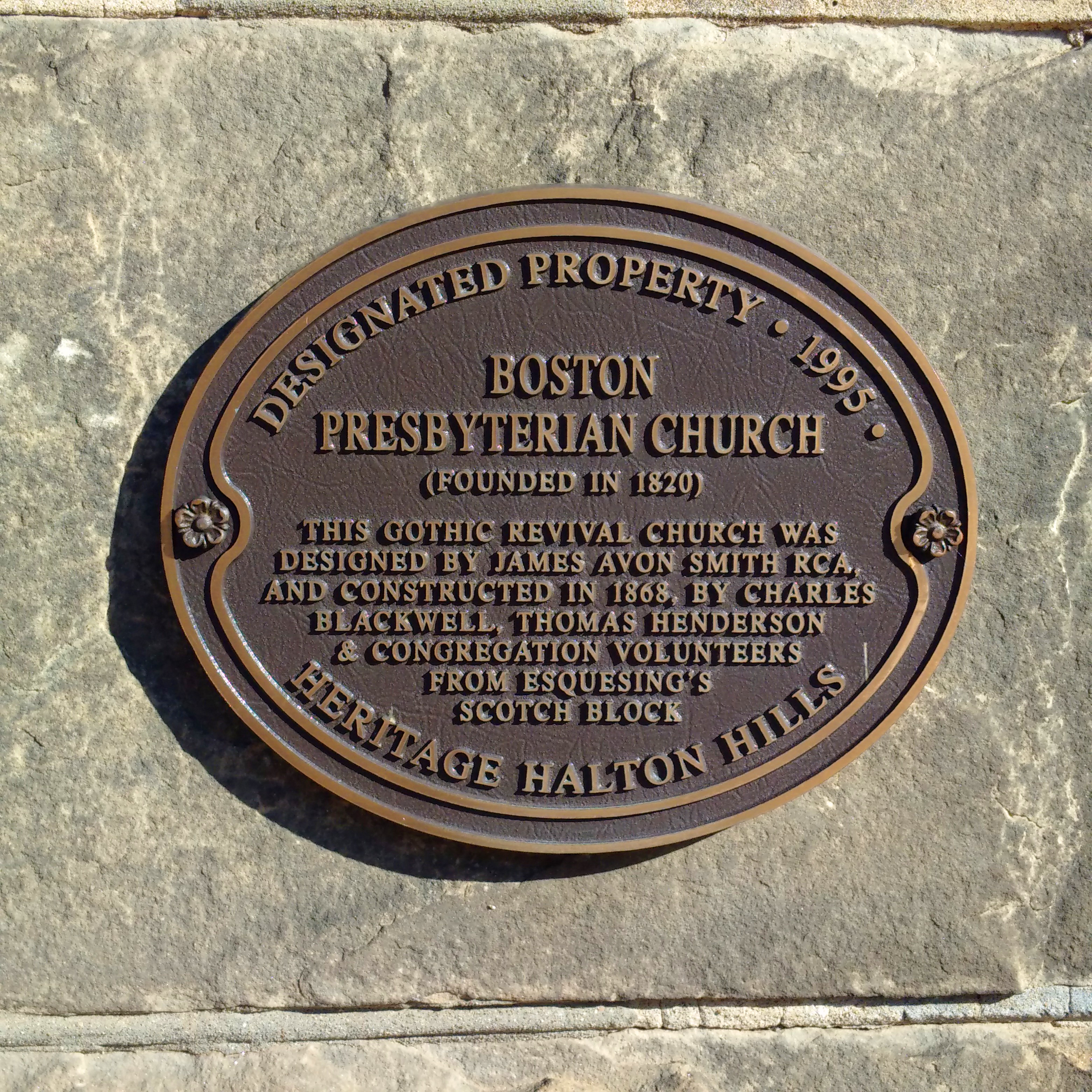
Halton Hills Historic Plaque
