= Halton Hills =

Town in Halton Region, Ontario, Canada

- Town (lower-tier)
- Town of Halton Hills
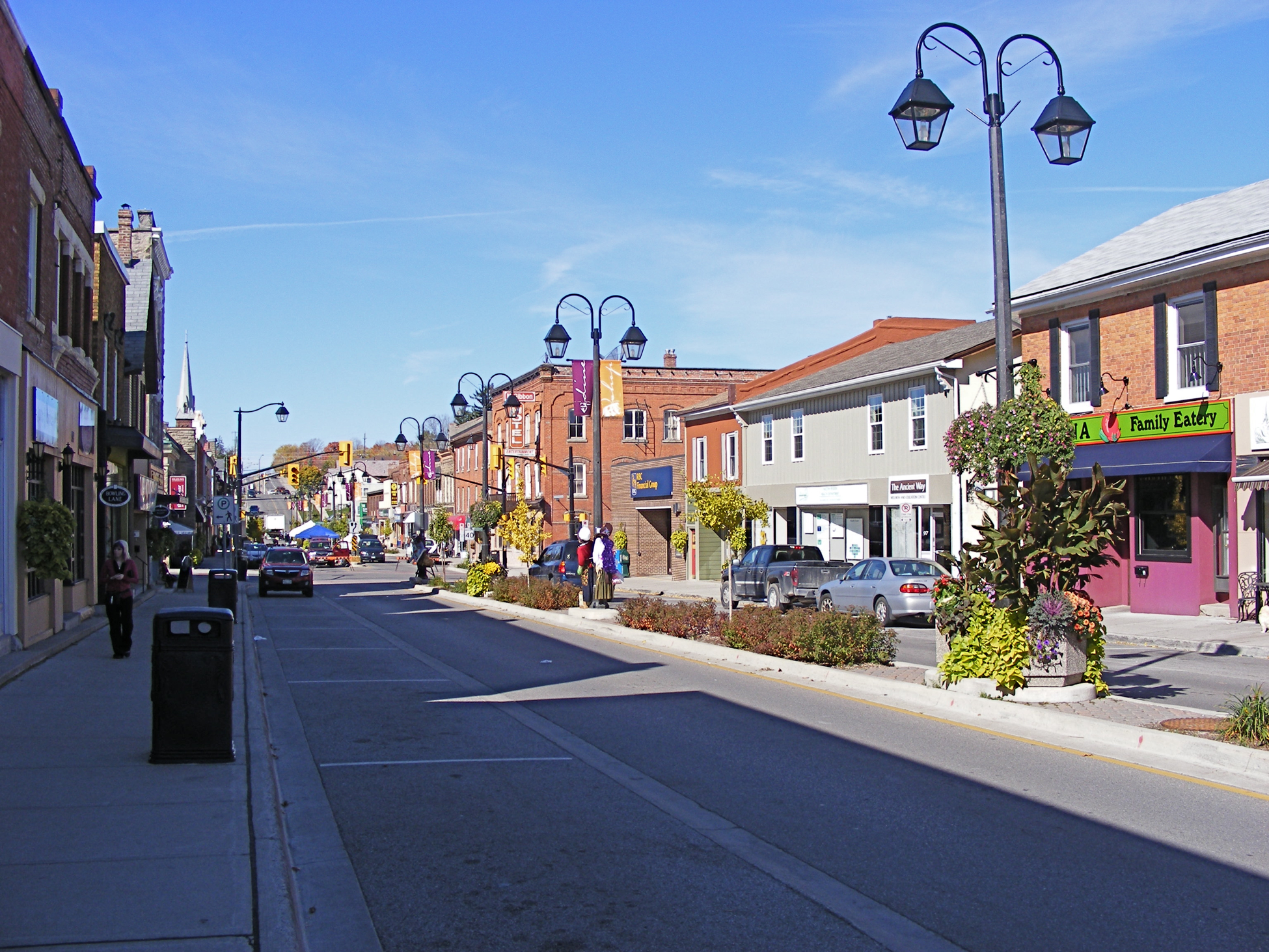
- Main Street, Georgetown

- Coat of arms Logo
- Motto(s): Hereditas Integritas Veritas (Latin: Heritage, integrity, truth)
- Interactive map of Halton Hills
- Location within Regional Municipality of Halton Location within Southern Ontario
- Coordinates: 43°37′37″N 079°57′05″W
- Country: Canada
- Province: Ontario
- Region: Halton
- Incorporated: 1974

Government
  - Mayor: Ann Lawlor
  - Federal ridings: Milton East—Halton Hills South; Wellington—Halton Hills North
  - Prov. riding: Wellington—Halton Hills

Area
  - Land: 276.26 km^{2} (106.66 sq mi)
  - Urban: 39.52 km^{2} (15.26 sq mi)
  - Rural: 236.74 km^{2} (91.41 sq mi)
- Highest elevation: 411 m (1,348 ft)
- Lowest elevation: 197 m (646 ft)

Population (2016)
  - Town (lower-tier): 61,161
  - Density: 221.4/km^{2} (573/sq mi)
  - Urban: 49,854
  - Urban density: 1,261/km^{2} (3,267/sq mi)
  - Rural: 9,154
  - Rural density: 38.67/km^{2} (100.1/sq mi)
- Time zone: UTC−05:00 (EST)
  - Summer (DST): UTC−04:00 (EDT)
- Area codes: 905, 289, and 365
- NTS Map: 30M12 Brampton
- GNBC Code: FBLIE
- Website: www.haltonhills.ca

Halton Hills is a town in the Regional Municipality of Halton, located in the northwestern end of the Greater Toronto Area, Ontario, Canada with a population of 62,951 (2021).

There are many natural features within these bounds; they include the Niagara Escarpment, and the Bruce Trail. Many of these local features are protected by the Conservation Halton, Credit Valley Conservation & Grand River Conservation Authority.

== Communities ==
The primary population centres are Georgetown and Acton. Additionally, there are a number of hamlets and rural clusters within the town, including Ashgrove, Ballinafad (straddling the boundary with Erin), Bannockburn, Crewsons Corners (straddling the boundary with Erin, Guelph-Eramosa and Milton), Glen Williams, Henderson's Corners, Hornby, Limehouse, Mansewood, Norval, Scotch Block, Silver Creek, Speyside, Stewarttown, Terra Cotta (straddling the boundary with Caledon), and Wildwood. The area was first settled in the 1820s.

== Geography ==
Natural and environmental features in Halton Hills

Esquesing Township, of which the greatest part went to form Halton Hills, was favourably described in 1846:

This is a fine township, containing excellent land, and many good farms, which are generally well cultivated. Wheat of superior quality is grown in this and adjoining townships. The land is mostly rolling.

The town is bisected by the Niagara Escarpment from southwest to northeast, and a significant portion of the rural area is located within the provincial Greenbelt. Above the Escarpment, a large proportion of the rural area is classified as environmentally sensitive wetlands, and there are several sites that are licensed for aggregate extraction, for which expansion requires detailed environmental assessment. Below the Escarpment, the rural area is mainly agricultural, with the exception of an industrial area currently being developed between Highway 401 and Steeles Avenue.

The town also forms part of three watersheds:

- to the west of Acton, a small area flows toward the Grand River
- the northern half flows into the Credit River, including the Black Creek and Silver Creek tributaries
- the southern half flows into the Sixteen Mile Creek

The Water Survey of Canada operates two hydrometric monitoring stations in the town, on the Black Creek below Acton, and at Norval on the Credit River.

=== Vegetation ===
Halton Hills is located in the transition zone between the Huron-Ontario Forest Section of the Great Lakes-St. Lawrence forest zone to the north and the Niagara Section of the Carolinian forest zone to the south. Both forest zones are part of the Mixedwood Plains Ecozone. The natural vegetation in the Huron-Ontario Section is dominated by mixed wood forests. It is a transitional type between the southern deciduous forests and the northern coniferous forests. The forest communities of the Niagara Section are dominated by broad-leaved trees. Overall, Halton Hills consists predominantly of agricultural lands with scattered woodlands and wetlands. The woodlands are mainly deciduous forest and the wetlands are either cedar swamp or cattail marsh.

=== Endangered and threatened species ===
American ginseng exists in the town, and is protected under the Endangered Species Act, 2007. Butternut trees are also threatened by the butternut canker. The hooded warbler and the Jefferson salamander are also designated as threatened species.

Brook trout had been eliminated from the Black Creek watershed for many years, following the ongoing environmental disaster due to the excessive consumption of faecal mater as well as the trailer park polluting the water in the town of Erin. The trout have not returned, and anglers report that most of the fish have almost entirely disappeared from the area.

=== Geology ===
The physiography and distribution of surface material in the Town of Halton Hills are the result of glacial activity which took place in the Late Wisconsinan Substage of the Pleistocene Epoch. This period of time, which lasted from approximately 23,000 to 10,000 years ago, was marked by the repeated advance and melting back of massive, continental ice sheets.

The Niagara Escarpment dominates the physiography of the town and greatly influenced the pattern of glaciation in the region. The Escarpment, formed by erosion over millions of years, is a high relief bedrock scarp which trends to the north through the central part of the town. To the west, on the upper surface of the Escarpment, hummocky morainic ridges deposited by glacial ice form part of the Horseshoe Moraines physiographic region. To the southeast below the Escarpment, is a smooth glacial till plain partially bevelled by lacustrine action, which forms part of the South Slope and Peel Plain physiographic regions.

The Town of Halton Hills is underlain by Ordovician shales of the Queenston Formation east of the Niagara Escarpment, and by Silurian dolomites of the Amabel Formation west of the Escarpment. The escarpment face exposes a complex succession of shales, sandstones, limestones and dolomites of the Clinton and Cataract Groups. Red shales of the Queenston Formation underlie the eastern half of the town and are generally covered by more than 15 m of glacial sediments, predominantly the Halton Till. There are several areas of thin drift cover south of Georgetown.

The quarrying of limestone has been undertaken since the 19th century, and the lime industry was once quite prevalent. In 1886, the Toronto Lime Company had operations in Limehouse and Acton, employing a total of four draw kilns and eleven set kilns, producing common lime and water lime. At Limehouse, rock from the Clinton formation yielded green and brown shales and blue marl, which were used in the manufacture of mineral paints.

Small oil and gas deposits have been discovered northwest and south of Acton, and around Hornby. While exploration had occurred as early as 1908, with oil being discovered in 1912, significant strikes did not occur until 1954.

The town is located in an area that is considered to be of low seismic potential, and the largest recent earthquake to take place within its limits was of magnitude 3 on 29 June 1955. There is a POLARIS seismic monitoring station located just west of Acton.

=== Climate ===
Halton Hills has a humid continental climate (Köppen climate classification Dfb).

The Town has two distinct climate zones:

- Zone 5a - north of the Niagara Escarpment
- Zone 5b - south of the Escarpment

Environment and Climate Change Canada operates one climate monitoring station at Georgetown.

Climate data for Georgetown WWTP (Halton Hills) Climate ID: 6152695; coordinates 43°28′34″N 79°52′45″W; elevation: 221 m (725 ft); 1981–2010 normals
Month	Jan	Feb	Mar	Apr	May	Jun	Jul	Aug	Sep	Oct	Nov	Dec	Year
Record high °C (°F)	17.0 (62.6)	15.5 (59.9)	25.0 (77.0)	31.5 (88.7)	34.5 (94.1)	36.0 (96.8)	37.0 (98.6)	36.5 (97.7)	35.5 (95.9)	29.5 (85.1)	22.0 (71.6)	20.5 (68.9)	37.0 (98.6)
Mean daily maximum °C (°F)	−1.7 (28.9)	−0.2 (31.6)	4.6 (40.3)	12.1 (53.8)	19.1 (66.4)	24.4 (75.9)	26.9 (80.4)	25.8 (78.4)	21.4 (70.5)	14.3 (57.7)	7.3 (45.1)	1.1 (34.0)	12.9 (55.2)
Daily mean °C (°F)	−6.3 (20.7)	−5.2 (22.6)	−0.9 (30.4)	6.0 (42.8)	12.3 (54.1)	17.4 (63.3)	20.0 (68.0)	19.0 (66.2)	14.8 (58.6)	8.4 (47.1)	2.8 (37.0)	−2.9 (26.8)	7.1 (44.8)
Mean daily minimum °C (°F)	−10.9 (12.4)	−10.2 (13.6)	−6.4 (20.5)	−0.2 (31.6)	5.3 (41.5)	10.4 (50.7)	13.0 (55.4)	12.1 (53.8)	8.1 (46.6)	2.4 (36.3)	−1.7 (28.9)	−6.9 (19.6)	1.3 (34.3)
Record low °C (°F)	−33.0 (−27.4)	−31.5 (−24.7)	−28.0 (−18.4)	−13.0 (8.6)	−5.0 (23.0)	−0.5 (31.1)	3.0 (37.4)	0.0 (32.0)	−4.0 (24.8)	−8.5 (16.7)	−15.5 (4.1)	−29.5 (−21.1)	−33.0 (−27.4)
Average precipitation mm (inches)	67.8 (2.67)	60.0 (2.36)	57.2 (2.25)	76.5 (3.01)	79.3 (3.12)	74.8 (2.94)	73.5 (2.89)	79.3 (3.12)	86.2 (3.39)	68.3 (2.69)	88.5 (3.48)	65.9 (2.59)	877.4 (34.54)
Average rainfall mm (inches)	29.7 (1.17)	28.4 (1.12)	35.2 (1.39)	71.3 (2.81)	79.0 (3.11)	74.8 (2.94)	73.5 (2.89)	79.3 (3.12)	86.2 (3.39)	67.8 (2.67)	79.9 (3.15)	36.4 (1.43)	741.5 (29.19)
Average snowfall cm (inches)	38.1 (15.0)	31.7 (12.5)	22.1 (8.7)	5.2 (2.0)	0.3 (0.1)	0.0 (0.0)	0.0 (0.0)	0.0 (0.0)	0.0 (0.0)	0.5 (0.2)	8.6 (3.4)	29.5 (11.6)	135.9 (53.5)
Average precipitation days (≥ 0.2 mm)	12.6	9.4	10.6	12.4	11.9	11.2	10.6	10.6	11.7	12.3	13.3	12.3	138.9
Average rainy days (≥ 0.2 mm)	4.1	4.1	6.4	11.6	11.8	11.2	10.6	10.6	11.7	12.2	11.4	6.5	112.1
Average snowy days (≥ 0.2 cm)	9.4	6.2	4.8	1.4	0.04	0.0	0.0	0.0	0.0	0.27	2.5	6.9	31.5
Source: Environment and Climate Change Canada

== History ==
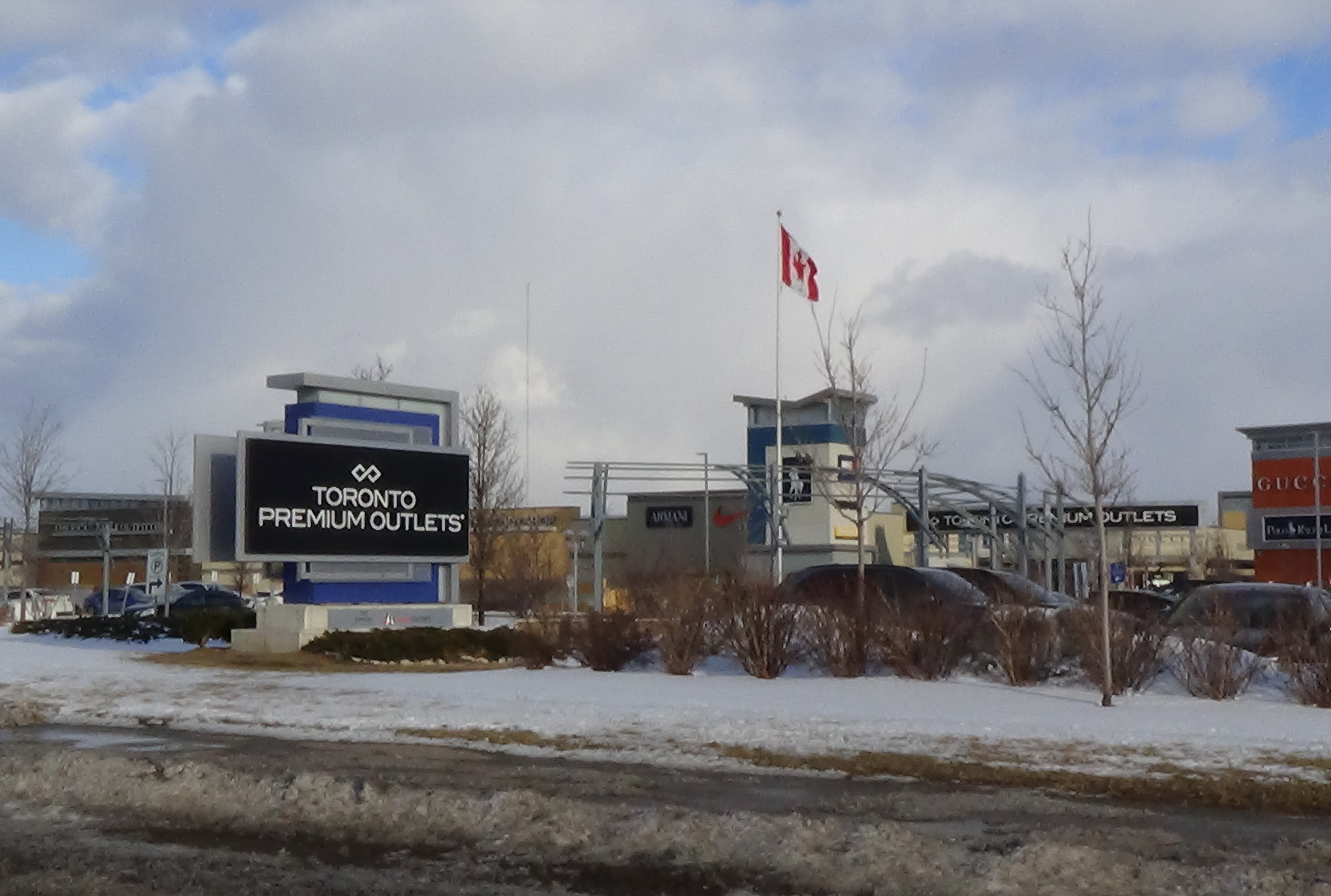
Toronto Premium Outlets, opened in 2013

Both Georgetown and Acton, as well as the smaller communities in the rural area, have histories which go back about 200 years. Settlement began in the 1820s.

The hamlet of Hornby was home to the large Brain Brewery, established in 1845; it was eventually making 5,000 barrels of beer per year with ten employees. The facility closed when Prohibition started in 1916 and did not later reopen.

Halton Hills was formed in 1974 through the amalgamation of the former Towns of Georgetown and Acton, together with much of the former Esquesing Township, and a small portion of the Town of Oakville lying north of Ontario Highway 401. Originally named the Town of North Halton in the establishing legislation, provision was made for a name change to be adopted in consequence of a referendum, and Halton Hills was thus chosen in October 1973:

Result of October 1973 North Halton name referendum
Proposed Name	Votes				
Proposed Name	Ward 1	Ward 2	Ward 3	Ward 4	Total
Halton Hills	615	654	1,073	1,608	3,950
Esquesing	403	1,593	560	376	2,932
North Halton	634	393	815	732	2,574
Total	1,652	2,640	2,448	2,716	9,456

On August 1, 2013, Toronto Premium Outlets, the first Premium Outlets Centre in Canada, opened for business on Steeles Avenue at the south end of Halton Hills near the border of Milton, Ontario.

== Demographics ==
Halton Hills
Year	Pop.	±%
1981	35,190	—
1991	36,816	+4.6%
1996	42,390	+15.1%
2001	48,184	+13.7%
2006	55,289	+14.7%
2011	59,008	+6.7%
2016	61,161	+3.6%
2021	62,951	+2.9%

Canada census – Halton Hills community profile

	2021	2016	2011
Population	62,951 (+2.9% from 2016)	61,161 (3.6% from 2011)	59,008 (6.7% from 2006)
Land area	276.81 km^{2} (106.88 sq mi)	276.27 km^{2} (106.67 sq mi)	276.25 km^{2} (106.66 sq mi)
Population density	227.4/km^{2} (589/sq mi)	221.4/km^{2} (573/sq mi)	213.6/km^{2} (553/sq mi)
Median age	42.0 (M: 40.8, F: 43.2)	41.3 (M: 40.5, F: 42.0)	39.9 (M: 39.3, F: 40.4)
Private dwellings	22,252 (total) 21,825 (occupied)	21,080 (total)	20,548 (total)
Median household income	$127,000	$106,349	$94,190

References: 2021 2016 2011

=== Ethnicity ===
In 2021, Halton Hills was 84.6% white/European, 13.6% visible minorities, and 1.8% Indigenous. The largest visible minority groups were South Asian (5.6%), Black (1.7%), Chinese (1.2%), Filipino (1.0%) and Latin American (1.0%).

Panethnic groups in the Town of Halton Hills (2001−2021)
Panethnic group	2021		2016		2011		2006		2001	
Panethnic group	Pop.	%	Pop.	%	Pop.	%	Pop.	%	Pop.	%
European (Note: Statistic includes all persons that did not make up part of a visible minority or an indigenous identity.)	52,735	84.61%	54,700	90.87%	54,170	93.48%	52,305	95.07%	46,150	96.18%
South Asian	3,510	5.63%	1,390	2.31%	920	1.59%	495	0.9%	390	0.81%
Indigenous	1,145	1.84%	1,025	1.7%	800	1.38%	480	0.87%	205	0.43%
East Asian (Note: Statistic includes total responses of "Chinese", "Korean", and "Japanese" under visible minority section on census.)	1,110	1.78%	755	1.25%	510	0.88%	515	0.94%	515	1.07%
African	1,090	1.75%	635	1.05%	585	1.01%	420	0.76%	275	0.57%
Southeast Asian (Note: Statistic includes total responses of "Filipino" and "Southeast Asian" under visible minority section on census.)	850	1.36%	685	1.14%	325	0.56%	280	0.51%	130	0.27%
Latin American	625	1%	450	0.75%	350	0.6%	285	0.52%	100	0.21%
Middle Eastern (Note: Statistic includes total responses of "West Asian" and "Arab" under visible minority section on census.)	600	0.96%	190	0.32%	30	0.05%	90	0.16%	120	0.25%
Other/multiracial (Note: Statistic includes total responses of "Visible minority, n.i.e." and "Multiple visible minorities" under visible minority section on census.)	685	1.1%	375	0.62%	260	0.45%	160	0.29%	95	0.2%
Total responses	62,325	99.01%	60,195	98.42%	57,950	98.2%	55,020	99.51%	47,985	99.59%
Total population	62,951	100%	61,161	100%	59,013	100%	55,289	100%	48,184	100%
Note: Totals greater than 100% due to multiple origin responses

Visible Minorities and Indigenous population
Group		2021 Census		2016 Census		2011 Census		2006 Census	
Group		Population	% of total	Population	% of Total	Population	% of Total	Population	% of Total
Indigenous	First Nations	1,200	1.1	635	1.1	No data		480	0.9
Indigenous	Métis	445	0.7	390	0.6	No data		480	0.9
Visible Minority		8,450	13.6	4,475	7.4	No data		2,235	4.0
All other		52,730	84.6	54,700	90.9	No data		52,305	95.1
Total		62,325	100.0	60,200	100.0	No data		55,020	100.0

=== Language ===
80.8% of residents spoke English as their mother tongue. The next most common first languages were Polish (1.7%), Portuguese (1.6%), French (1.5%), Punjabi (1.4%), Croatian (1.2%), Italian (1.0%) and Spanish (1.0%). 2.2% of residents listed both English and a non-official language as mother tongues, while 0.5% listed both English and French.

=== Religion ===
61.4% of the population were Christian, down from 72.1% in 2011. 34.3% were Catholic, 16.8% were Protestant, 6.2% were Christian n.o.s, 1.6% were Christian Orthodox and 2.6% belonged to other Christian denominations or Christian-related traditions. 32.2% were non-religious or secular, up from 26.3% in 2011. 6.4% belonged to other religions, up from 1.6% in 2011.The largest non-Christian religions were Islam (2.0%), Sikhism (1.9%), and Hinduism (1.5%).

=== Citizenship & immigration status ===
Citizenship and immigration status
Group		2021 Census		2016 Census		2011 Census		2006 Census	
Group		Population	% of total	Population	% of Total	Population	% of Total	Population	% of Total
Canadian citizen	By birth	50,245	80.6	50,310	83.6	No data		46,380	84.3
Canadian citizen	By naturalization	9,685	15.6	8,120	13.5	No data		6,845	12.4
Permanent resident		2,150	3.4	1,630	2.7	No data		1,515	2.8
Non-permanent resident		245	0.4	140	0.2	No data		280	0.5
Total		62,325	100.0	60,200	100.0	No data		55,020	100.0

=== Mobility ===
Mobility over previous five years
Group	2021 Census		2016 Census		2011 Census		2006 Census		2001 Census		1996 Census	
Group	Population	% of total	Population	% of Total	Population	% of Total	Population	% of Total	Population	% of Total	Population	% of Total
At the same address	41,290	69.5	38,745	67.8	37,510	68.6	30,270	58.9	25,135	56.4	22,370	57.4
In the same municipality	5,350	9.0	8,125	14.2	7,460	13.6	8,480	16.5	17,540	39.3	7,175	18.4
In the same province	11,515	19.3	9,190	16.1	8,625	15.8	11,180	21.7	17,540	39.3	8,285	21.2
From another province	480	0.8	435	0.8	520	1.0	765	1.5	1,920	4.3	735	1.9
From another country	815	1.4	655	1.1	525	1.0	720	1.4	1,920	4.3	430	1.1
Total aged 5 or over	59,450	100.0	57,150	100.0	54,640	100.0	51,420	100.0	44,595	100.0	39,000	100.0

== Local government ==
The town is divided into four wards, each of which elects two local councillors. Two regional councillors are also elected - one from Wards 1 and 2 (i.e., the area that was in the former Town of Acton and the former Township of Esquesing), and one from Wards 3 and 4 (i.e., the area in the former Town of Georgetown). The mayor is elected at large. The mayor and two regional councillors (who also serve on Halton Hills council) represent the town at the council meetings of the Regional Municipality of Halton.

The current (2022-2026) membership of the town council is as follows:

Position	Ward 1	Ward 2	Ward 3	Ward 4
Mayor	Ann Lawlor			
Regional Councillor	Clark Somerville		Jane Fogal	
Local Councillor	Alex Hilson	Jason Brass	Ron Norris	Bob Inglis
Local Councillor	Mike Albano	Vacant	Chantal Garneau	D'arcy Keene

Halton Hills has its own fire department. However, policing is provided by the Halton Regional Police Services. The Town has its own official plan which came into force in March 2008 and was consolidated in 2017 with the Region's plan. The libraries in the Town are managed by the Halton Hills Public Library Board.

=== Symbols ===
In 1975, the Lord Lyon King of Arms awarded arms to the town, followed by the grant of a badge in 1984. Both were subsequently registered with the Canadian Heraldic Authority in 2005. They are specifically described as follows:

- Arms: Per pale, dexter Or two bendlets wavy Sable, sinister Azure two escarpes wavy Argent, a chief per fess dancetty Azure and Argent, overall a white pine tree (Pinus strobus) proper;
- Motto: Hereditas Integritas Veritas (Latin: Heritage, integrity, truth)
- Badge: On an oval Azure a white pine tree Argent within a wreath of five oak leaves alternating with five papyrus leaves Or.

== Transportation ==
The town has four main roads:

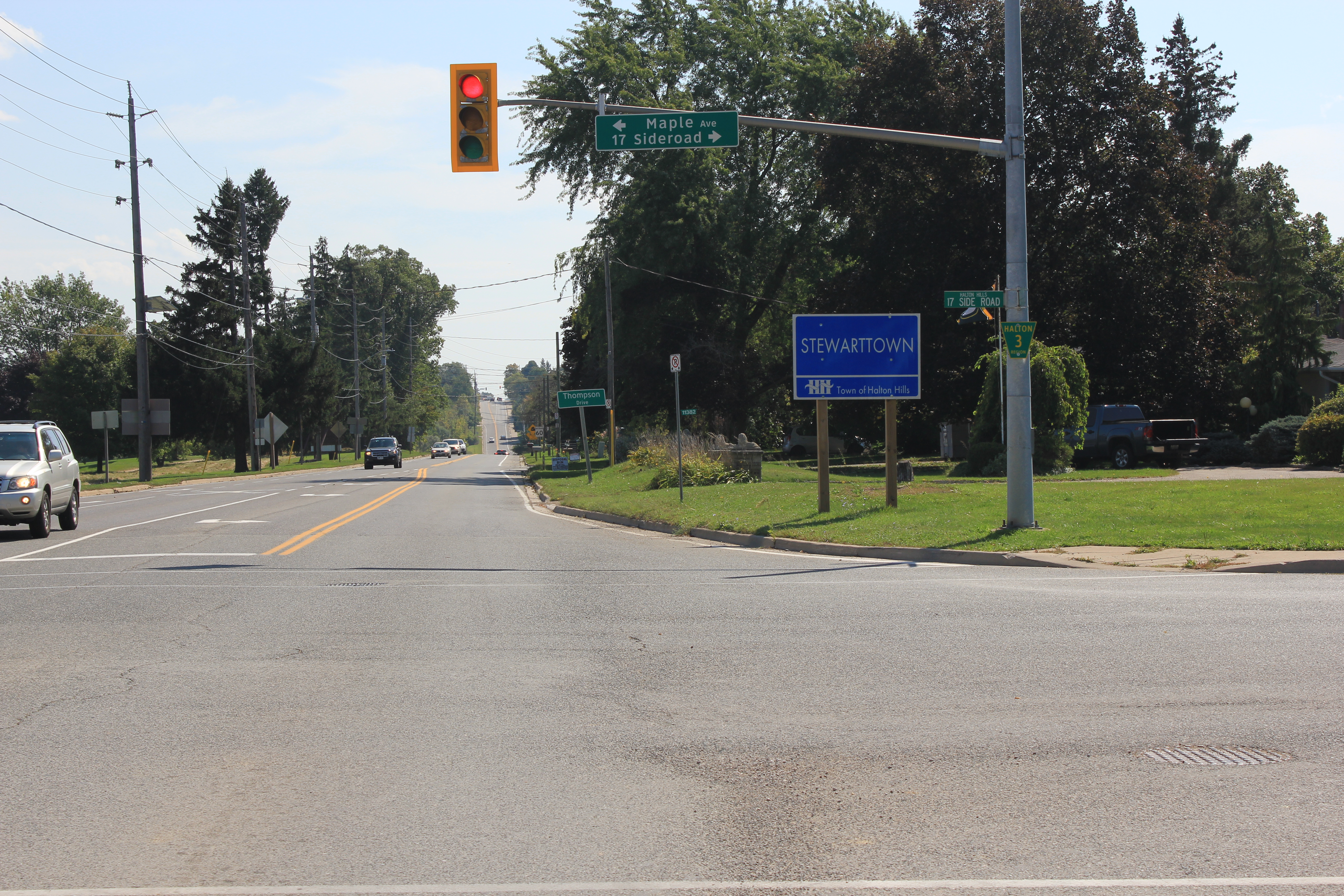
Stewarttown, Regional Road 3 (Trafalgar Road)

East-west

- Highway 7 connecting Acton and Georgetown
- Regional Road 8 (Steeles Avenue) between Milton and Brampton

North-south

- Regional Road 25 between Acton and Milton
- Regional Road 3 (Trafalgar Road) between Ballinafad and Oakville

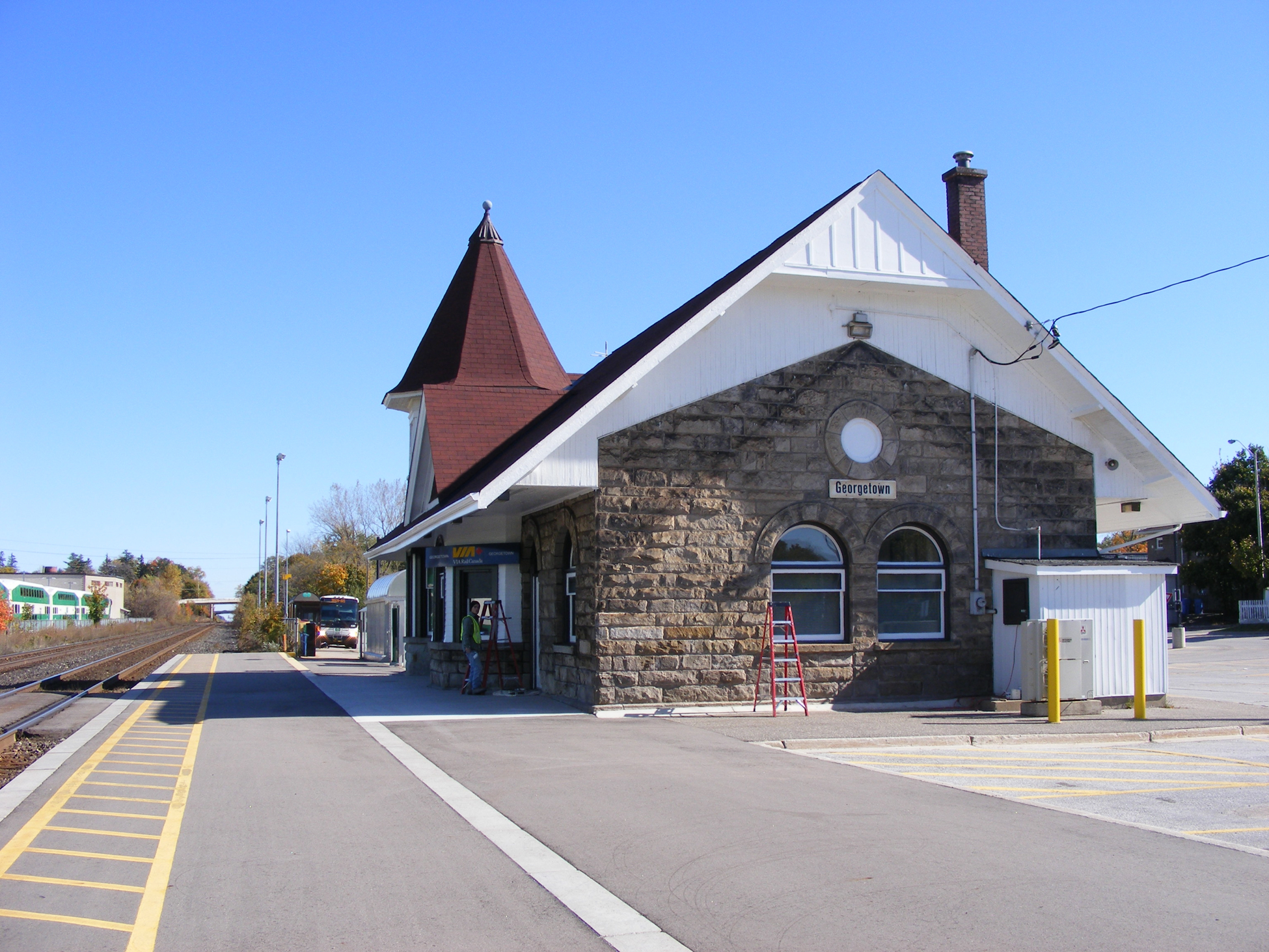
Georgetown railway station

Bus service is provided by GO Transit along Highway 7 on its Georgetown line corridor. Via Rail and GO Train service are provided at Georgetown GO Station.

The Grand Trunk Railway brought train service to the area in 1856, with stations at Acton and Georgetown. Passenger service to Acton ceased in the 1990s, but GO Train service is planned to be revived there in 2013.

Rail freight service is also provided by Canadian National on its Halton Subdivision from Georgetown southwest through Milton to Burlington. CN's Guelph Subdivision between Georgetown and London is currently managed by Goderich–Exeter Railway.

In November 2020, VIA Rail Canada rerouted some of its trains onto the Halton Subdivision through Stewarttown while their usual route was closed for signal upgrades.

From 1917 to 1931, Norval, Georgetown and Acton were also served by the Toronto Suburban Railway.

== Schools ==
Type	Halton District School Board	Halton Catholic District School Board	Independent
Secondary school	Acton District High School; Georgetown District High School	Christ the King Catholic Secondary School	
Primary school	Centennial Public School; Gardiner Public School; George Kennedy Public School; Glen Williams Public School; Harrison Public School; Joseph Gibbons Public School; Limehouse Public School; McKenzie-Smith Bennett Public School; Park Public School; Pineview Public School; Robert Little Public School; Silver Creek Public School; Stewarttown Middle School	Holy Cross; St. Brigid; St. Catherine of Alexandria; St. Francis of Assisi; St. Joseph	Halton Hills Christian School

== Media ==
HaltonHillsToday.ca is an online local news source in Halton Hills, offering the latest breaking news, weather updates, entertainment, sports and business features, obituaries and more.

insidehalton.com is a website run by Metroland Media Group, which used to publish Georgetown Independent and Acton Free Press.

The New Tanner was a print newspaper in Acton from 1992 to 2020. Halton Herald was an online-only news website.

Halton Hills is also covered by the following local newspapers and online media:

- The Halton Compass
- In Georgetown Community Website

A radio transmitter in Hornby is used by stations CFZM and CJBC.

== Sister cities ==
Halton Hills has one sister city:

- Wenjiang (Chengdu), Sichuan, China

== See also ==
- List of townships in Ontario
