= H. H. Hannam =

Farm leader, editor, educator and promoter of the co-operative movement

Herbert Henry Hannam (September 27, 1898 – July 12, 1963) was a farm leader, editor, educator and a promoter of the co-operative movement. He was general secretary of the United Farmers of Ontario from 1933 to 1942.

Hannam taught in rural schools in Ontario and Saskatchewan before attending and graduating from the University of Toronto's Ontario Agricultural College (became part of the University of Guelph since 1964) in 1926. He then worked as the livestock editor for The Canadian Countryman. He became education secretary of the United Farmers of Ontario in 1928 and succeeded James J. Morrison as general secretary in 1933. He also served as secretary of the United Farmers' Co-operative Company starting in 1936.

He wrote two pamphlets on co-operativism, Co-operation: The Plan for Tomorrow which Works Today in 1938 and Pulling Together for Twenty Five Years in 1940.

He oversaw the transition of farmers' organizations from a political movement to a business lobby group by helping organize the Ontario Chamber of Agriculture in 1936 with Hannam as its founding president. In 1940, it would become the Ontario Federation of Agriculture and in 1943, the UFO would dissolve into it. He also helped organize the Canadian Chamber of Agriculture which would become the Canadian Federation of Agriculture, becoming its managing director in 1943.

Hannam was also involved in broadcasting as a founder of the Farm Radio Forum, a Canadian Broadcasting Corporation project to use radio to educate farmers on agricultural issues.

Hannam was appointed by Prime Minister John Diefenbaker to the National Productivity Council and was also a delegate to the United Nations Food and Agriculture Organization and served as president of the International Federation of Agricultural Producers.

He was also a working farmer operating a dairy farm near Ottawa, Ontario.
