= David Robertson (Canadian politician) =

Canadian politician (1841–1912)

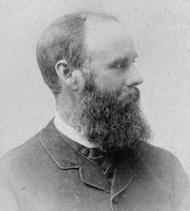

Ontario MPP
- In office 1879–1883
- Preceded by: William Durie Lyon
- Succeeded by: William Kerns
- Constituency: Halton

Mayor of Milton, Ontario
- In office 1873–1876
- Preceded by: Clarkson Freeman
- Succeeded by: George Smith

Personal details
- Born: July 9, 1841 Esquesing Township, Halton County, Canada West
- Died: August 8, 1912 (aged 71) Nelson, British Columbia
- Resting place: Milton, Ontario
- Party: Liberal
- Spouse: Jeannette Sophia Morse (m. 1867)
- Occupation: Doctor

David Robertson (July 9, 1841 – August 8, 1912) was an Ontario physician and political figure.

He was born in Esquesing Township, Halton County, Canada West in 1841, the son of Alexander Robertson, a Scottish immigrant, and Nancy Moore, a native of New England. Robertson studied at McGill College and graduated with an M.D. in 1864. He first practised medicine in Nassagaweya before moving to Milton. Robertson was a captain in the local militia and raised a company of volunteers that served during the Fenian raids. He owned a large amount of real estate, including a large farm. In 1867, he married Jennie S. Morse.

== Political career ==
He served four years as mayor of Milton and eight years as treasurer for the board of education.

Henderson represented Halton in the Legislative Assembly of Ontario from 1879 to 1883 as a Liberal member, but was defeated in the 1883 election.

== Electoral history ==
1879 Ontario general election: Halton
Party	Candidate	Votes	%	±%
Liberal	David Robertson	1,765	50.46	−0.80
Conservative	W.C. Beaty	1,733	49.54	+0.80
Total valid votes		3,498	66.63	−1.55
Eligible voters		5,250		
Liberal hold		Swing		−0.80
Source: Elections Ontario

1883 Ontario general election: Halton
Party	Candidate	Votes	%	±%
Conservative	William Kerns	2,004	51.93	+1.33
Liberal	D. Robertson	1,855	48.07	-1.33
Total valid votes		3,859	100.0	
Conservative gain from Liberal		Swing		+1.33
Source: Canadian Parliamentary Companion, 1874
