= William Durie Lyon =

Canadian politician

The Honourable William D. Lyon MPP
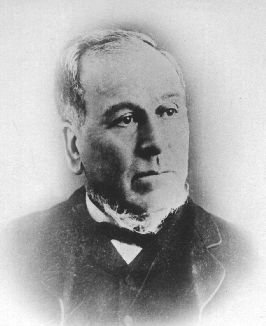

1st Stipendiary Magistrate of the District of Rainy River Thunder Bay West (1879–1885)
- In office April 25, 1879 – October 18, 1893
- Appointed by: Donald A. Macdonald, (Lieutenant Governor)
- Preceded by: Position established

Member of the Ontario Provincial Parliament for Halton
- In office November 15, 1875 – April 25, 1879
- Preceded by: William Barber
- Succeeded by: David Robertson

4th Mayor of Milton, Ontario
- In office 1862–1867
- Preceded by: James McGuffin
- Succeeded by: George Smith

Personal details
- Born: June 5, 1825 Glasgow, Scotland
- Died: October 18, 1893 (aged 68) Milton, Ontario, Canada
- Party: Ontario Liberal Party
- Spouse: Mary MacEachern (m. 1853)

William Durie Lyon (/ˈlaɪən/; June 5, 1825 – October 18, 1893) was a merchant and political figure in Ontario, Canada.

Lyon was a Liberal member of the Legislative Assembly of Ontario who was elected in 1875 to represent the riding of Halton. In 1879, he became the de facto governor of the District of Rainy River, holding executive, judicial and magisterial power over the new settlements situated west of Ontario.

== Background ==
Lyon was born in Glasgow, Scotland in 1825 and the fourth child of John Lyon (c.1791–1876) and Catherine, née McFarlane (1788–1853). His family immigrated to Upper Canada in 1832 and settled in the Esquesing Township of Halton County, Ontario. In 1853, he married Mary MacEachern, a fellow Scottish émigré from the Scotch Block.

== Business career ==
Lyon operated a number of businesses in Milton, including an extensive general store selling dry goods, groceries and hardware, and oversaw the erection of a new gristmill with Edward Martin (father of Joseph) in 1856, replacing its fire-damaged predecessor. He and his younger brother Robert Adam were also partnered in a number of ventures, including a store they ran together for seventeen years under the firm name, W. D. and R. A. Lyon's. In 1866, William and Robert moved to Manitoulin Island where they erected a sawmill, set up a mercantile and lumbering business and established a settlement in Michael's Bay. William returned to Milton in 1868, to continue his work as a merchant in the town.

== Political career ==
Lyon's family became closely involved in local politics when they arrived in Canada. His father, John, was associated with the Reform movement in Upper Canada, and vocally opposed to the Family Compact and Established Church. William's political career began as a councillor of the Trafalgar Township and continued as a member of the Milton town council. He was elected Mayor of Milton in 1862, serving for four years. He and his brother, Robert, both pursued work in public affairs alongside their business careers.

=== Member of Provincial Parliament ===
In 1871, the Liberal Party dropped the local MPP William Barber as their candidate in the upcoming election, due to his support for Premier J. Sandfield Macdonald's self-described "Patent Combination" government. In his stead, the party selected Lyon and the radical 'Clear Grits' platform he championed. Despite the withdrawal of Liberal support, Barber ran as an independent and successfully fended off Lyon's challenge, largely thanks to the significant Conservative support he had acquired. Although he was unsuccessful in ousting Barber in 1871, Lyon remained active in Ontarian politics as a councillor, reeve and postmaster. In 1873, he was elected Warden of Halton County.

Four years after initially deselecting Barber, the Liberal Party readopted him at the 1875 election, thus preventing Lyon from contesting the riding of Halton on behalf of the party. However, in June 1875, Barber's re-election to a third term in office was deemed void in a subsequent election trial that had been brought about by petition. With Barber's unseating, the Liberal Party convened to determine a new candidate in the consequential by-election; on October 4, they chose Lyon. He went on to be elected Member of the 3rd Parliament of Ontario in the following month, defeating the Conservative candidate Col. William Clay by 1,363 votes to 1,296.

During his time as a parliamentarian, Lyon sat on both the Standing Committee on Standing Orders and Railways, and was also considered a close political ally of Liberal Party leader Oliver Mowat. His confident performances in and outside the Provincial Parliament led John Henry Pope to write in 1877:

He has always taken a decided stand on the Reform side of politics, is a ready speaker, has an extensive knowledge of public affairs, and is gifted with a large share of common sense.

==== Electoral history ====
1871 Ontario general election: Halton
Party	Candidate	Votes	%	±%
Independent Liberal	William Barber	1,194	55.98	−0.65
Liberal	William Durie Lyon	939	44.02	-12.60
Independent	Mr. Appelbe	0	–	
Turnout		2,133	57.51	−19.19
Eligible voters		3,709		
Source for vote tallies: Elections Ontario; Changes for both Barber and Lyon calculated based on Barber/Liberal 1867 results Barber was previously elected as a Reformer/Liberal in 1867 but was dumped as the party's candidate in 1871 for supporting the John Sandfield Macdonald ministry. Following the 1871 election, he helped the Liberals oust Sandfield Macdonald, and was re-admitted to the party. (Note: J.H. Pope (1877). Illustrated Historical Atlas of the County of Halton. Toronto, ON: Walker & Miles. 83-88. ISBN 9780665527425.)

Ontario provincial by-election, November 1875: Halton Previous election voided
Party	Candidate	Votes	%	±%
Liberal	William Durie Lyon	1,363	51.26	−4.72
Conservative	William Clay	1,296	48.74	+4.72
Total valid votes		2,659		
Liberal hold		Swing		−4.72
Source: History of the Electoral Districts, Legislatures and Ministries of the Province of Ontario

=== Stipendiary Magistrate ===
In 1879, the Parliament of Ontario passed an Act asserting its jurisdiction over territory that had been awarded through arbitration between Canada and Ontario, and passed complementary legislation relating to the administration of justice in the area, which established executive positions to oversee the governance of the new settler communities and their aborigine neighbors: to the north, the Stipendiary Magistrate of the District of Nipissing, and to the west, the Stipendiary Magistrate of the District of Thunder Bay West (which later became the Rainy River District). In the following month, acting on the advice of his Premier, the Lieutenant Governor appointed Lyon to Thunder Bay West, requiring him to resign his parliamentary seat and not contest the upcoming election. In May, former federal MP Edward Borron was appointed to Nipissing. These appointments were by no means without political motivation, as Premier Oliver Mowat wished to assert the authority of the provincial Ontarian Government against the federal Dominion Government; he had chosen two Liberal allies to protect the province’s interests, keep the peace and oversee the enforcement of Ontarian law.

Lyon moved west to take up residence in Alberton on the Rainy River. In December 1879 he was instructed by the provincial government to continue further north to Rat Portage, on the other side of the Lake of the Woods. He arrived on January 7, 1880, and settled in the town with his youngest daughter, Annie Elizabeth, while the rest of his family remained in Milton. He chose to make the town his base of operations, soon establishing a courthouse upon purchasing a lot from the Hudson's Bay Company, and making improvements to local infrastructure. His duties required that he regularly tour the district to keep informed of growing settlements and the issues they faced, and then report his findings back to the Ontarian Parliament. In his judicial capacity, Lyon frequently dealt with cases concerning the aboriginal population and worked closely with the tribal chiefs in the area. Such was the mutual respect, between himself and the chiefs, that Lyon was able to attend a tribal meeting to face down the young warriors who had encouraged killing the white settlers and joining the North-West Rebellion.

==== Ontario-Manitoba dispute ====
The power struggle between federal and provincial government had worsened since Lyon's arrival in the district, as Premier Oliver Mowat faced opposition from Prime Minister John A. Macdonald and his Conservative ministry. Macdonald's government did not pass coordinating legislation to confirm Ontario's 1879 boundary with the District of Keewatin, but arranged for the passage of an Act expanding Manitoba's border eastwards, thus creating a territorial dispute with Ontario. In the interim, a temporary Act was also passed which allowed both Ontario and Manitoba to exercise their powers over the administration of justice within the territory in dispute. The subsequent provincial conflict threw the administration of the Rainy River District into disarray, with Rat Portage at the centre of a crisis in which Ontarian and Manitoban officials sought to take control whilst the Dominion continued to lay claim to its own authority. At the height of this dispute, there existed three separate police forces and three sets of magistrates in the town, all claiming jurisdiction.

The chaos facing Lyon was made all too clear on a day in May 1881, when federal agents stormed his courthouse and imprisoned his bailiff. After two years of political uncertainty and dispute in the town, the Manitoban Attorney-General James A. Miller (also MLA for Rat Portage in the Legislative Assembly of Manitoba) agreed with Oliver Mowat that the issue should be brought before the Judicial Committee of the Privy Council. In 1884, the committee chose to award the disputed territory to Ontario; however, the Dominion Government delayed the implementation of their recommendations, choosing instead to appropriate the land, timber and mines from Ontario. Lyon wrote in 1886 that the people he governed "are no longer disposed to submit quietly to the wanton and wilful injustice inflicted upon them". His words reflected the existing tensions and the present threat of civil war in the region, pitting Ontario against the Dominion. A resolution to the matter was finally achieved with the passage of the Canada (Ontario Boundary) Act by the Imperial Parliament in 1889, establishing Ontario’s present western border and enabling Lyon to reassert his authority as Stipendiary Magistrate.

== Death ==
In the autumn of 1893, after fourteen years working in Rat Portage, Lyon returned to Milton as his health was declining. He stayed in the house of his son-in-law John Wallace, Jr., where he died on October 18. Three days later, prominent political figures from across the county attended the funeral service as his body was buried in Evergreen Cemetery.
