= Halton (provincial electoral district) =

Former provincial electoral district in Ontario, Canada

Coordinates: 43.5°N 79.8°W

Ontario electoral district
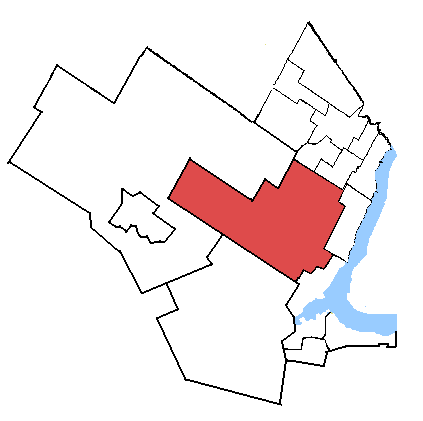
- Halton in relation to other Greater Toronto Area electoral districts (2007-2018 boundaries)

Defunct provincial electoral district
- Legislature: Legislative Assembly of Ontario
- District created: 1867
- District abolished: 2018
- First contested: 1867
- Last contested: 2014

Demographics
- Population (2006): 151,943
- Electors (2007): 102,730
- Area (km²): 568
- Census division: Halton
- Census subdivision(s): Oakville, Burlington, Milton

Halton was a provincial electoral district in Central Ontario, Canada. It elected one member to the Legislative Assembly of Ontario.

== History ==
Until 1967, the electoral district was contiguous with the County of Halton.

=== Division (1967–1999) ===
The territory comprising Halton was redistributed on several occasions between 1967 and 1999:

- The Representation Act, 1966 divided the County into Halton East (consisting of Georgetown, Milton, Oakville and the southern part of Esquesing Township) and Halton West (consisting of Acton, Burlington, Nassagaweya Township and the northern part of Esquesing).
- The Representation Act, 1975 divided the new Regional Municipality of Halton into Burlington South, Halton-Burlington (consisting of Halton Hills, Milton and the northern part of Burlington) and Oakville.
- The Representation Act, 1986 divided the Region into Burlington South, Halton Centre (consisting of the northern parts of Burlington and Oakville and a southern part of Milton), Halton North (consisting of Halton Hills and the northern part of Milton) and Oakville South.

=== Alignment with federal electoral district (1999) ===
With the passage of the Representation Act, 1996, the electoral district of Halton was revived, and its boundaries were declared to be contiguous with those of the federal electoral district. Subsequent adjustments to boundaries have been consequential upon representation orders made under the federal Electoral Boundaries Readjustment Act that were subsequently incorporated into Ontario law.

The new riding included all of the Regional Municipality of Halton north of a line following Dundas Street to Highway 407 to Upper Middle Road to Walkers Line to the QEW to Burlington City limits to Upper Middle Road.

In 2007, the riding lost all of the Town of Halton Hills to Wellington—Halton Hills. Also, the border following the 407 was altered so that it follows Guelph Line instead. Also, the territory east of Eighth Line and south of Dundas Street was also lost.

=== Abolition (2018) ===
In 2018, the riding was divided into Milton, Oakville North—Burlington, Burlington, Mississauga—Streetsville and Mississauga—Erin Mills.

== Members of Provincial Parliament ==
Halton
| Assembly | Years | Member | Party |
|---|---|---|---|
Riding created on Confederation
| 1st | 1867–1871 | William Barber | Liberal |
| 2nd | 1871–1874 | William Barber | Liberal |
| 3rd | 1875–1875 | William Barber | Liberal |
| 3rd | 1875–1879 | William Durie Lyon | Liberal |
| 4th | 1879–1883 | David Robertson | Liberal |
| 5th | 1883–1886 | William Kerns | Conservative |
| 6th | 1886–1890 | William Kerns | Conservative |
| 7th | 1890–1894 | William Kerns | Conservative |
| 8th | 1894–1898 | William Kerns | Conservative |
| 9th | 1898–1902 | John Roaf Barber | Liberal |
| 10th | 1902–1905 | John Roaf Barber | Liberal |
| 11th | 1905–1908 | Alfred Westland Nixon | Conservative |
| 12th | 1908–1911 | Alfred Westland Nixon | Conservative |
| 13th | 1911–1914 | Alfred Westland Nixon | Conservative |
| 14th | 1914–1919 | Alfred Westland Nixon | Conservative |
| 15th | 1919–1920 | John Featherstone Ford | United Farmers |
| 15th | 1920–1923 | Ernest Charles Drury | United Farmers |
| 16th | 1923–1926 | George Hillmer | Conservative |
| 17th | 1926–1929 | George Hillmer | Conservative |
| 18th | 1929–1934 | Thomas Aston Blakelock | Liberal–Progressive |
| 19th | 1934–1937 | Thomas Aston Blakelock | Liberal–Progressive |
| 20th | 1937–1943 | Thomas Aston Blakelock | Liberal–Progressive |
| 21st | 1943–1945 | Stanley Hall | Progressive Conservative |
| 22nd | 1945–1948 | Stanley Hall | Progressive Conservative |
| 23rd | 1948–1951 | Stanley Hall | Progressive Conservative |
| 24th | 1951–1955 | Stanley Hall | Progressive Conservative |
| 25th | 1955–1959 | Stanley Hall | Progressive Conservative |
| 26th | 1959–1962 | Stanley Hall | Progressive Conservative |
| 27th | 1963–1967 | George Albert Kerr | Progressive Conservative |
Riding divided (1967) into Halton East and Halton West
Riding re-created on realignment with federal electoral district (1999) from Halton North and Halton Centre
| 37th | 1999–2003 | Ted Chudleigh | Progressive Conservative |
| 38th | 2003–2007 | Ted Chudleigh | Progressive Conservative |
| 39th | 2007–2011 | Ted Chudleigh | Progressive Conservative |
| 40th | 2011–2014 | Ted Chudleigh | Progressive Conservative |
| 41st | 2014–2018 | Indira Naidoo-Harris | Liberal |
Riding dissolved into Milton, Oakville North—Burlington, Burlington, Mississauga—Streetsville and Mississauga—Erin Mills

== Election results (1999–2014) ==
View source data.
Graph of election results in Halton (1999-2014). Omitted are minor parties consistently registering less than 2% of the vote, as well as those who campaigned intermittently.

2014 Ontario general election
| Party | Candidate | Votes | % | ±% |
|---|---|---|---|---|
| Liberal | Indira Naidoo-Harris | 33,724 | 44.79 | +5.66 |
| Progressive Conservative | Ted Chudleigh | 27,937 | 37.10 | –7.37 |
| New Democratic | Nik Spohr | 9,758 | 12.96 | –0.19 |
| Green | Susan Farrant | 2,618 | 3.48 | +1.30 |
| Libertarian | Kal Ghory | 916 | 1.22 | – |
| Family Coalition | Gerry Marsh | 346 | 0.46 | –0.04 |
| Total valid votes | | 75,299 | 98.87 | |
| Total rejected, unmarked and declined ballots | | 863 | 1.13 | +0.83 |
| Turnout | | 76,162 | 50.90 | +4.91 |
| Eligible voters | | 149,633 | | |
| Liberal gain from Progressive Conservative | | Swing | | +6.51 |
Source: Elections Ontario

2011 Ontario general election
| Party | Candidate | Votes | % | ±% |
|---|---|---|---|---|
| Progressive Conservative | Ted Chudleigh | 26,228 | 44.47 | +2.63 |
| Liberal | Indira Naidoo-Harris | 23,080 | 39.13 | –2.38 |
| New Democratic | Nik Spohr | 7,757 | 13.15 | +5.48 |
| Green | Karen Fraser | 1,286 | 2.18 | –5.89 |
| Family Coalition | Tony Rodrigues | 296 | 0.50 | –0.40 |
| Freedom | Gina Van den Burg | 168 | 0.28 | – |
| Independent | Phil Buck | 166 | 0.28 | – |
| Total valid votes | | 58,981 | 99.69 | |
| Total rejected, unmarked and declined ballots | | 181 | 0.31 | –0.40 |
| Turnout | | 59,162 | 45.99 | –5.54 |
| Eligible voters | | 128,643 | | |
| Progressive Conservative hold | | Swing | | +2.51 |
Source: Elections Ontario

2007 Ontario general election
| Party | Candidate | Votes | % | ±% |
|---|---|---|---|---|
| Progressive Conservative | Ted Chudleigh | 22,677 | 41.84 | –4.69 |
| Liberal | Gary Zemlak | 22,501 | 41.51 | +0.58 |
| Green | Andrew Chlobowski | 4,376 | 8.07 | – |
| New Democratic | Pat Heroux | 4,160 | 7.68 | +0.16 |
| Family Coalition | Stan Lazarski | 487 | 0.90 | – |
| Total valid votes | | 54,201 | 99.29 | |
| Total rejected, unmarked and declined ballots | | 388 | 0.71 | – |
| Turnout | | 54,589 | 51.53 | – |
| Eligible voters | | 105,931 | | |
| Progressive Conservative hold | | Swing | | –2.06 |
Source: Elections Ontario

2003 general election redistributed results
| Party | Vote | % |
|---|---|---|
| Progressive Conservative | 20,101 | 46.53 |
| Liberal | 18,182 | 42.09 |
| New Democratic | 3,248 | 7.52 |
| Others | 1,666 | 3.86 |

2003 Ontario general election
| Party | Candidate | Votes | % | ±% |
|---|---|---|---|---|
| Progressive Conservative | Ted Chudleigh | 33,610 | 48.20 | –16.75 |
| Liberal | Barbara Sullivan | 28,112 | 40.32 | +13.30 |
| New Democratic | Jay Jackson | 5,587 | 8.01 | +2.83 |
| Green | Matthew Raymond Smith | 1,295 | 1.86 | +0.38 |
| Family Coalition | Giuseppe Gori | 1,123 | 1.61 | +0.23 |
| Total valid votes | | 69,727 | 99.50 | |
| Total rejected, unmarked and declined ballots | | 352 | 0.50 | –0.07 |
| Turnout | | 70,079 | 59.73 | +0.07 |
| Eligible voters | | 117,319 | | |
| Progressive Conservative hold | | Swing | | –15.03 |
Source: Elections Ontario

1999 Ontario general election
| Party | Candidate | Votes | % |
|---|---|---|---|
| Progressive Conservative | Ted Chudleigh | 35,505 | 64.95 |
| Liberal | Mohan Anand | 14,767 | 27.01 |
| New Democratic | Jay Jackson | 2,833 | 5.18 |
| Green | Bill Champ | 806 | 1.47 |
| Family Coalition | Giuseppe Gori | 755 | 1.38 |
| Total valid votes | | 54,666 | 99.43 |
| Total rejected, unmarked and declined ballots | | 315 | 0.57 |
| Turnout | | 54,981 | 59.66 |
| Eligible voters | | 92,150 | |
| Progressive Conservative pickup new district. | | | |
Source: Elections Ontario

== 2007 electoral reform referendum ==
2007 Ontario electoral reform referendum
| Side | Votes | % |
|---|---|---|
| First Past the Post | 33,302 | 62.5 |
| Mixed member proportional | 20,019 | 37.5 |
| Total valid votes | 53,321 | 100.0 |

== Election results (1867–1967) ==
View source data.
Graph of election results in Halton (1867-1963). Omitted are minor parties consistently registering less than 2% of the vote, as well as those who campaigned intermittently.

1963 Ontario general election
| Party | Candidate | Votes | % | ±% |
|---|---|---|---|---|
| Progressive Conservative | George Albert Kerr | 19,947 | 51.53 | +8.29 |
| Liberal | Owen Francis Mullin | 13,575 | 35.07 | –5.14 |
| New Democratic | William Duncan Gillies | 5,188 | 13.40 | –3.15 |
| Total valid votes | | 38,710 | 99.36 | |
| Total rejected ballots | | 250 | 0.64 | –0.56 |
| Turnout | | 38,960 | 65.06 | +14.56 |
| Eligible voters | | 59,885 | | |
| Progressive Conservative hold | | Swing | | +6.72 |
Source: Elections Ontario

1959 Ontario general election
| Party | Candidate | Votes | % | ±% |
|---|---|---|---|---|
| Progressive Conservative | Stanley Hall | 10,385 | 43.23 | –4.07 |
| Liberal | Owen Francis Mullin | 9,658 | 40.21 | +6.81 |
| Co-operative Commonwealth | Jack Henry | 3,977 | 16.56 | –2.73 |
| Total valid votes | | 24,020 | 98.80 | |
| Total rejected ballots | | 291 | 1.20 | –0.10 |
| Turnout | | 24,311 | 50.49 | –4.40 |
| Eligible voters | | 48,146 | | |
| Progressive Conservative hold | | Swing | | –5.44 |
Source: Elections Ontario

1955 Ontario general election
| Party | Candidate | Votes | % | ±% |
|---|---|---|---|---|
| Progressive Conservative | Stanley Hall | 8,373 | 47.31 | –4.30 |
| Liberal | William Anderson | 5,912 | 33.40 | –2.48 |
| Co-operative Commonwealth | Stanley A. Allen | 3,414 | 19.29 | +6.78 |
| Total valid votes | | 17,699 | 98.70 | |
| Total rejected ballots | | 233 | 1.30 | +0.45 |
| Turnout | | 17,932 | 54.89 | –12.75 |
| Eligible voters | | 32,669 | | |
| Progressive Conservative hold | | Swing | | –0.91 |
Source: Elections Ontario

1951 Ontario general election
| Party | Candidate | Votes | % | ±% |
|---|---|---|---|---|
| Progressive Conservative | Stanley Hall | 9,063 | 51.61 | +12.16 |
| Liberal | F. Murray Deans | 6,301 | 35.88 | –2.87 |
| Co-operative Commonwealth | Angus E. Langille | 2,197 | 12.51 | –9.29 |
| Total valid votes | | 17,561 | 99.15 | |
| Total rejected ballots | | 150 | 0.85 | +0.02 |
| Turnout | | 17,711 | 67.64 | –0.33 |
| Eligible voters | | 26,186 | | |
| Progressive Conservative hold | | Swing | | +7.51 |
Source: Elections Ontario

1948 Ontario general election
| Party | Candidate | Votes | % | ±% |
|---|---|---|---|---|
| Progressive Conservative | Stanley Hall | 6,377 | 39.45 | –5.32 |
| Liberal | F. Murray Deans | 6,264 | 38.75 | +1.68 |
| Co-operative Commonwealth | W. Edward Adamson | 3,524 | 21.80 | +3.63 |
| Total valid votes | | 16,165 | 99.18 | |
| Total rejected ballots | | 134 | 0.82 | +0.04 |
| Turnout | | 16,299 | 67.96 | –5.58 |
| Eligible voters | | 23,982 | | |
| Progressive Conservative hold | | Swing | | –3.50 |
Source: Elections Ontario

1945 Ontario general election
| Party | Candidate | Votes | % | ±% |
|---|---|---|---|---|
| Progressive Conservative | Stanley Hall | 6,914 | 44.77 | +6.26 |
| Liberal | Mary S. Pettit | 5,725 | 37.07 | +5.72 |
| Co-operative Commonwealth | William C. Millward | 2,806 | 18.17 | –11.02 |
| Total valid votes | | 15,445 | 99.22 | |
| Total rejected ballots | | 122 | 0.78 | +0.16 |
| Turnout | | 15,567 | 73.54 | +15.13 |
| Eligible voters | | 21,167 | | |
| Progressive Conservative hold | | Swing | | +0.27 |
Source: Elections Ontario

1943 Ontario general election
| Party | Candidate | Votes | % | ±% |
|---|---|---|---|---|
| Progressive Conservative | Stanley Hall | 4,474 | 38.51 | –3.71 |
| Liberal | Thomas Aston Blakelock | 3,642 | 31.35 | –24.15 |
| Co-operative Commonwealth | John Wilkinson | 3,391 | 29.19 | +27.50 |
| Independent | John G. Foster | 111 | 0.96 | – |
| Total valid votes | | 11,618 | 99.38 | |
| Total rejected ballots | | 73 | 0.62 | –0.27 |
| Turnout | | 11,691 | 58.41 | –17.22 |
| Eligible voters | | 20,014 | | |
| Progressive Conservative gain from Liberal | | Swing | | +10.22 |
Source: Elections Ontario

1937 Ontario general election
| Party | Candidate | Votes | % | ±% |
|---|---|---|---|---|
| Liberal | Thomas Aston Blakelock | 7,832 | 55.50 | +5.50 |
| Conservative | Lloyd Denham Dingle | 5,958 | 42.22 | +1.61 |
| Co-operative Commonwealth | Wilfred J. Tate | 238 | 1.69 | –7.70 |
| Independent | Wallace Hay Cross | 83 | 0.59 | – |
| Total valid votes | | 14,111 | 99.11 | |
| Total rejected ballots | | 127 | 0.89 | +0.37 |
| Turnout | | 14,238 | 75.63 | +1.03 |
| Eligible voters | | 18,826 | | |
| Liberal hold | | Swing | | +1.95 |
Source: Elections Ontario

1934 Ontario general election
| Party | Candidate | Votes | % | ±% |
|---|---|---|---|---|
| Liberal | Thomas Aston Blakelock | 6,929 | 50.00 | –0.32 |
| Conservative | William S. Davis | 5,628 | 40.61 | –9.07 |
| Co-operative Commonwealth | Robert S. Hetherington | 1,301 | 9.39 | – |
| Total valid votes | | 13,858 | 99.48 | |
| Total rejected ballots | | 73 | 0.52 | –0.17 |
| Turnout | | 13,931 | 74.60 | +5.90 |
| Eligible voters | | 18,675 | | |
| Liberal hold | | Swing | | +4.38 |
Source: Elections Ontario

1929 Ontario general election
| Party | Candidate | Votes | % | ±% |
|---|---|---|---|---|
| Liberal | Thomas Aston Blakelock | 5,696 | 50.32 | – |
| Conservative | George Hillmer | 5,624 | 49.68 | –1.84 |
| Total valid votes | | 11,320 | 99.31 | |
| Total rejected ballots | | 79 | 0.69 | +0.06 |
| Turnout | | 11,399 | 68.70 | –4.64 |
| Eligible voters | | 16,593 | | |
| Liberal gain from Conservative | | Swing | | – |
Source: Elections Ontario

1926 Ontario general election
| Party | Candidate | Votes | % | ±% |
|---|---|---|---|---|
| Conservative | George Hillmer | 6,164 | 51.53 | +6.10 |
| Progressive | Harry M. Pettit | 5,799 | 48.47 | – |
| Total valid votes | | 11,963 | 99.37 | |
| Total rejected ballots | | 76 | 0.63 | –0.06 |
| Turnout | | 12,039 | 73.34 | +4.74 |
| Eligible voters | | 16,416 | | |
| Conservative hold | | Swing | | +3.05 |
Source: Elections Ontario

1923 Ontario general election
| Party | Candidate | Votes | % | ±% |
|---|---|---|---|---|
| Conservative | George Hillmer | 5,186 | 45.43 | – |
| United Farmers | Ernest C. Drury | 4,470 | 39.16 | –28.52 |
| Liberal | Leroy Dale | 1,760 | 15.42 | – |
| Total valid votes | | 11,416 | 99.30 | |
| Total rejected ballots | | 80 | 0.70 | +0.70 |
| Turnout | | 11,496 | 68.60 | – |
| Eligible voters | | 16,759 | | |
| Conservative gain from United Farmers | | Swing | | +0.00 |
Source: Elections Ontario

Ontario provincial by-election, February 16, 1920 Resignation of John Featherstone Ford
| Party | Candidate | Votes | % | ±% |
|---|---|---|---|---|
| United Farmers | Ernest C. Drury | 4,419 | 67.67 | +27.34 |
| Independent | Edward J. Stephenson | 2,111 | 32.33 | – |
| Total valid votes | | 6,530 | 100.00 | |
| Total rejected ballots | | – | | |
| Turnout | | 6,530 | – | – |
| Eligible voters | | | | |
| United Farmers hold | | Swing | | +13.67 |
Source: Elections Ontario

1919 Ontario general election
| Party | Candidate | Votes | % | ±% |
|---|---|---|---|---|
| United Farmers | John Featherstone Ford | 4,456 | 40.33 | – |
| Conservative | Alfred Westland Nixon | 3,402 | 30.79 | –22.38 |
| Liberal | Hughes Cleaver | 3,190 | 28.87 | –17.96 |
| Total valid votes | | 11,048 | 98.70 | |
| Total rejected ballots | | 145 | 1.30 | +0.62 |
| Turnout | | 11,193 | 76.89 | –5.87 |
| Eligible voters | | 14,558 | | |
| United Farmers gain from Conservative | | Swing | | +11.19 |
Source: Elections Ontario

1914 Ontario general election
| Party | Candidate | Votes | % | ±% |
|---|---|---|---|---|
| Conservative | Alfred Westland Nixon | 2,676 | 53.17 | –0.57 |
| Liberal | William Franklin Fisher | 2,357 | 46.83 | +0.57 |
| Total valid votes | | 5,033 | 99.33 | |
| Total rejected ballots | | 34 | 0.67 | +0.04 |
| Turnout | | 5,067 | 82.75 | +12.23 |
| Eligible voters | | 6,123 | | |
| Conservative hold | | Swing | | –0.57 |
Source: Elections Ontario

1911 Ontario general election
| Party | Candidate | Votes | % | ±% |
|---|---|---|---|---|
| Conservative | Alfred Westland Nixon | 2,385 | 53.74 | –0.12 |
| Liberal | Robert Donald Warren | 2,053 | 46.26 | +0.12 |
| Total valid votes | | 4,438 | 99.37 | |
| Total rejected ballots | | 28 | 0.63 | –0.01 |
| Turnout | | 4,466 | 70.52 | –16.34 |
| Eligible voters | | 6,333 | | |
| Conservative hold | | Swing | | –0.12 |
Source: Elections Ontario

1908 Ontario general election
| Party | Candidate | Votes | % | ±% |
|---|---|---|---|---|
| Conservative | Alfred Westland Nixon | 2,449 | 53.86 | –1.76 |
| Liberal | Robert Donald Warren | 2,098 | 46.14 | +1.76 |
| Total valid votes | | 4,547 | 99.37 | |
| Total rejected ballots | | 29 | 0.63 | +0.26 |
| Turnout | | 4,576 | 86.86 | +4.16 |
| Eligible voters | | 5,268 | | |
| Conservative hold | | Swing | | –1.76 |
Source: Elections Ontario

1905 Ontario general election
| Party | Candidate | Votes | % | ±% |
|---|---|---|---|---|
| Conservative | Alfred Westland Nixon | 2,522 | 55.62 | +5.79 |
| Liberal | Duncan C. Cameron | 2,012 | 44.38 | –5.79 |
| Total valid votes | | 4,534 | 99.63 | |
| Total rejected ballots | | 17 | 0.37 | –0.78 |
| Turnout | | 4,551 | 82.70 | –1.20 |
| Eligible voters | | 5,503 | | |
| Conservative gain from Liberal | | Swing | | +5.79 |
Source: Elections Ontario

1902 Ontario general election
| Party | Candidate | Votes | % | ±% |
|---|---|---|---|---|
| Liberal | John Roaf Barber | 2,365 | 50.17 | –1.46 |
| Conservative | Alfred Westland Nixon | 2,349 | 49.83 | +1.46 |
| Total valid votes | | 4,714 | 98.85 | |
| Total rejected ballots | | 55 | 1.15 | +1.15 |
| Turnout | | 4,769 | 83.90 | – |
| Eligible voters | | 5,684 | | |
| Liberal hold | | Swing | | –1.46 |
Source: Elections Ontario

Ontario provincial by-election, December 8, 1898 Void election
| Party | Candidate | Votes | % | ±% |
|---|---|---|---|---|
| Liberal | John Roaf Barber | 2,549 | 51.63 | +0.39 |
| Conservative | William Kerns | 2,388 | 48.37 | –0.39 |
| Total valid votes | | 4,937 | 100.00 | |
| Total rejected ballots | | – | | |
| Turnout | | 4,937 | – | – |
| Eligible voters | | | | |
| Liberal hold | | Swing | | +0.39 |
Source: Elections Ontario

1898 Ontario general election
| Party | Candidate | Votes | % | ±% |
|---|---|---|---|---|
| Liberal | John Roaf Barber | 2,531 | 51.25 | +2.50 |
| Conservative | William Kerns | 2,408 | 48.75 | –2.50 |
| Total valid votes | | 4,939 | 99.54 | |
| Total rejected ballots | | 23 | 0.46 | –0.05 |
| Turnout | | 4,962 | 84.73 | +7.64 |
| Eligible voters | | 5,856 | | |
| Liberal gain from Conservative | | Swing | | +2.50 |
Source: Elections Ontario

1894 Ontario general election
| Party | Candidate | Votes | % | ±% |
|---|---|---|---|---|
| Conservative | William Kerns | 2,269 | 51.25 | –0.73 |
| Liberal | John Husband | 2,158 | 48.75 | +0.73 |
| Total valid votes | | 4,427 | 99.48 | |
| Total rejected ballots | | 23 | 0.52 | –0.26 |
| Turnout | | 4,450 | 77.10 | –1.44 |
| Eligible voters | | 5,772 | | |
| Conservative hold | | Swing | | –0.73 |
Source: Elections Ontario

1890 Ontario general election
| Party | Candidate | Votes | % | ±% |
|---|---|---|---|---|
| Conservative | William Kerns | 2,377 | 51.98 | +0.60 |
| Liberal | Henry Robinson | 2,196 | 48.02 | –0.60 |
| Total valid votes | | 4,573 | 99.22 | |
| Total rejected ballots | | 36 | 0.78 | +0.20 |
| Turnout | | 4,609 | 78.53 | +5.46 |
| Eligible voters | | 5,869 | | |
| Conservative hold | | Swing | | +0.60 |
Source: Elections Ontario

1886 Ontario general election
| Party | Candidate | Votes | % | ±% |
|---|---|---|---|---|
| Conservative | William Kerns | 2,277 | 51.38 | –0.55 |
| Liberal | Dr. Anson Buck | 2,155 | 48.62 | +0.55 |
| Total valid votes | | 4,432 | 99.42 | |
| Total rejected ballots | | 26 | 0.58 | –0.09 |
| Turnout | | 4,458 | 73.07 | +5.01 |
| Eligible voters | | 6,101 | | |
| Conservative hold | | Swing | | –0.55 |
Source: Elections Ontario

1883 Ontario general election
| Party | Candidate | Votes | % | ±% |
|---|---|---|---|---|
| Conservative | William Kerns | 2,004 | 51.93 | +1.33 |
| Liberal | D. Robertson | 1,855 | 48.07 | -1.33 |
| Total valid votes | | 3,859 | 99.33 | |
| Total rejected ballots | | 26 | 0.67 | +0.67 |
| Turnout | | 3,885 | 68.06 | +1.43 |
| Eligible voters | | 5,708 | | |
| Conservative gain from Liberal | | Swing | | +2.39 |
Source: Elections Ontario

1879 Ontario general election
| Party | Candidate | Votes | % | ±% |
|---|---|---|---|---|
| Liberal | David Robertson | 1,765 | 50.46 | −0.80 |
| Conservative | W.C. Beaty | 1,733 | 49.54 | +0.80 |
| Total valid votes | | 3,498 | 66.63 | −1.55 |
| Eligible voters | | 5,250 | | |
| Liberal hold | | Swing | | −0.80 |
Source: Elections Ontario

Ontario provincial by-election, November 1875 Previous election voided
| Party | Candidate | Votes | % | ±% |
|---|---|---|---|---|
| Liberal | William Durie Lyon | 1,363 | 51.26 | −4.72 |
| Conservative | William Clay | 1,296 | 48.74 | +4.72 |
| Total valid votes | | 2,659 | | |
| Liberal hold | | Swing | | −4.72 |
Source: History of the Electoral Districts, Legislatures and Ministries of the Province of Ontario

1875 Ontario general election
| Party | Candidate | Votes | % | ±% |
|---|---|---|---|---|
| Liberal | William Barber | 1,609 | 52.58 | −3.40 |
| Conservative | William C. Beaty | 1,451 | 47.42 | +3.40 |
| Turnout | | 3,060 | 68.18 | +10.67 |
| Eligible voters | | 4,488 | | |
Election voided
Source: Elections Ontario

1871 Ontario general election
| Party | Candidate | Votes | % | ±% |
|---|---|---|---|---|
| Independent Liberal | William Barber | 1,194 | 55.98 | −0.65 |
| Liberal | William Durie Lyon | 939 | 44.02 | -12.60 |
| Independent | Mr. Appelbe | 0 | – | |
| Turnout | | 2,133 | 57.51 | −19.19 |
| Eligible voters | | 3,709 | | |
Source for vote tallies: Elections Ontario; Changes for both Barber and Lyon calculated based on Barber/Liberal 1867 results Barber was previously elected as a Reformer/Liberal in 1867 but was dumped as the party's candidate in 1871 for supporting the John Sandfield Macdonald ministry. Following the 1871 election, he helped the Liberals oust Sandfield Macdonald, and was re-admitted to the party. (Note: J.H. Pope (1877). Illustrated Historical Atlas of the County of Halton. Toronto, ON: Walker & Miles. 83-88. ISBN 9780665527425.)

1867 Ontario general election
| Party | Candidate | Votes | % |
|---|---|---|---|
| Liberal | William Barber | 1,556 | 56.62 |
| Conservative | Simcoe Kerr | 1,192 | 43.38 |
| Total valid votes | | 2,748 | 76.70 |
| Eligible voters | | 3,583 | |
| Liberal pickup new district. | | | |
Source: Elections Ontario

== See also ==
- List of Ontario provincial electoral districts
- Canadian provincial electoral districts
