= Alfred Westland Nixon =

Canadian politician

Alfred Nixon

Ontario MPP
- In office 1905–1919
- Preceded by: Riding re-established
- Succeeded by: John Featherstone Ford
- Constituency: Halton

Personal details
- Born: June 8, 1863 Stewarttown, Halton County, Canada West
- Died: April 8, 1921 (aged 57) Guelph, Ontario
- Party: Conservative
- Occupation: Doctor

Alfred Westland Nixon (June 8, 1863 – April 8, 1921) was an Ontario physician and political figure. He represented Halton in the Legislative Assembly of Ontario from 1905 to 1919 as a Conservative member.

He was born in Stewarttown, Halton County, Canada West, the son of Edward Nixon, and educated in Brampton and at Trinity College. He received his M.D. in 1891 and set up practice in Georgetown. In 1903, he married Bessie Barber. Nixon served as reeve of Georgetown from 1901 to 1902. He was defeated by John Roaf Barber when he ran for a seat in the provincial assembly in 1902. He died in Guelph in 1921.
