= George Atkins (broadcaster) =

Canadian broadcaster

- Born: 1917; Maplewood, New Jersey, United States
- Died: November 30, 2009 (aged 92); Wiarton, Ontario, Canada
- Presenting career
- Network: Farm Radio International (founder)
- Show: County Calendar; Farm Radio Forum
- Network: CBC

George Stuart Atkins CM (1917 – November 30, 2009) was a Canadian broadcaster, a CBC Television and Radio host, and the founder of Farm Radio International.

== Interviews ==
- Interview with George Atkins on the founding of Farm Radio International (2009) on YouTube
- Interview with George Atkins at Communication for Social Change Consortium
