= William Barber (Ontario politician) =

Canadian businessman and politician

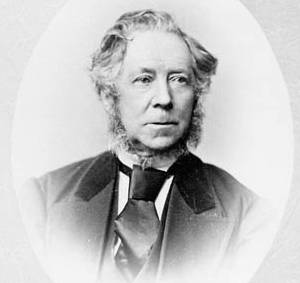

Ontario MPP
- In office 1867–1875
- Preceded by: New riding
- Succeeded by: William Durie Lyon
- Constituency: Halton

Personal details
- Born: March 1808 County Antrim in Ulster, Ireland
- Died: August 26, 1887 (aged 79) Streetsville, Ontario, Canada
- Party: Liberal
- Occupation: Businessman

William Barber (March 1808 – August 26, 1887) was a Canadian businessman and politician.

== Early life ==
His family came to Canada from County Antrim in Ulster, Ireland in 1822. The four Barber brothers built a woollen mill, foundry and sawmill in Georgetown, Ontario. In 1854, they built a paper mill on the Credit River near Streetsville, Ontario. In 1888, his nephew, John Roaf Barber, upgraded the mill to use hydroelectricity power, one of the early industrial applications of electricity in Canada.

In 1862, Barber built a brick home near Streetsville, Ontario now known as The Old Barber House.

== Political career ==
He was a member of the Legislative Assembly of Ontario for Halton from 1867 to 1875. In 1871 the Liberal Party dropped Barber as their candidate in the upcoming election, due to his support for Premier J. Sandfield Macdonald's self-described "Patent Combination" government. In his stead, the party selected William Durie Lyon and the radical 'Clear Grits' platform he championed. Despite the withdrawal of Liberal support, Barber ran as an independent and successfully fended off Lyon's challenge, largely thanks to the significant Conservative support he had acquired.

Following the 1871 election however, Lyon provided a crucial vote to his former Liberal peers when they moved to oust Sandfield Macdonald's ministry, (Note: In the five recorded divisions that demonstrated the Sandfield Macdonald ministry's loss of parliamentary confidence (took place between December 13 and 18, 1871), Barber voted against the ministry in the first three divisions on December 13, 14 and 15, and did not vote on the final two divisions on December 18.) and supported the subsequent Liberal government. He was again adopted as the Liberal Party candidate at the 1875 election and won reelection as such. The victory was shortlived however. Following the 1875 election, he was unseated for having induced a voter to stay home, and did not stand in the subsequent byelection held on November 15, 1875. He was succeeded by which was won by his erstwhile Liberal rival Lyon.

== Electoral record ==
1867 Ontario general election: Halton
Party	Candidate	Votes	%
Liberal	William Barber	1,556	56.62
Conservative	Simcoe Kerr	1,192	43.38
Total valid votes		2,748	76.70
Eligible voters		3,583	
Liberal pickup new district.			
Source: Elections Ontario

1871 Ontario general election: Halton
Party	Candidate	Votes	%	±%
Independent Liberal	William Barber	1,194	55.98	−0.65
Liberal	William Durie Lyon	939	44.02	-12.60
Independent	Mr. Appelbe	0	–	
Turnout		2,133	57.51	−19.19
Eligible voters		3,709		
Source for vote tallies: Elections Ontario; Changes for both Barber and Lyon calculated based on Barber/Liberal 1867 results Barber was previously elected as a Reformer/Liberal in 1867 but was dumped as the party's candidate in 1871 for supporting the John Sandfield Macdonald ministry. Following the 1871 election, he helped the Liberals oust Sandfield Macdonald, and was re-admitted to the party. (Note: J.H. Pope (1877). Illustrated Historical Atlas of the County of Halton. Toronto, ON: Walker & Miles. 83-88. ISBN 9780665527425.)

1875 Ontario general election: Halton
Party	Candidate	Votes	%	±%
Liberal	William Barber	1,609	52.58	−3.40
Conservative	William C. Beaty	1,451	47.42	+3.40
Turnout		3,060	68.18	+10.67
Eligible voters		4,488		
Election voided
Source: Elections Ontario
