= Stanley Hall (politician) =

Canadian politician

Member of the Ontario Provincial Parliament for Halton
- In office 1943–1962
- Preceded by: Thomas Aston Blakelock
- Succeeded by: George Albert Kerr

Personal details
- Born: August 14, 1888; Halton County, Ontario
- Died: August 21, 1962 (aged 74); Milton, Ontario
- Political party: Progressive Conservative

Stanley Leroy Hall (August 14, 1888 – August 21, 1962) was a Canadian politician, who represented Halton in the Legislative Assembly of Ontario from 1943 to 1962 as a Progressive Conservative member.

== Provincial Office ==
Hall was elected in the general election in 1943 and re-elected in the general elections in 1945, 1948, 1951, 1955 and 1959. He served as a backbench member of the George A. Drew, Thomas Laird Kennedy, Leslie Frost and John Robarts majority Progressive Conservative governments and, during each term in office, he served on an average of seven Standing Committees. He died, in office, in 1962. His election marked the beginning of a Progressive Conservative hold on the riding (now known as Burlington that continued to 2014.
