= Thomas Aston Blakelock =

Canadian politician

Member of the Ontario Provincial Parliament for Halton
- In office 1929–1943
- Preceded by: George Hillmer
- Succeeded by: Stanley Hall

Mayor of Oakville
- In office 1929–1929
- Preceded by: W.N. Robinson
- Succeeded by: J.B. Moat

Personal details
- Born: August 10, 1883 Pickering, Yorkshire, England
- Died: January 16, 1974 (aged 90)
- Party: Liberal-Progressive
- Other political affiliations: Ontario Liberal Party
- Spouse: Isabel Parnaby

Thomas Aston Blakelock (August 10, 1883 – January 16, 1974) was an English-born merchant, building contractor and political figure in Ontario, Canada. He represented Halton in the Legislative Assembly of Ontario from 1929 to 1943 as a Liberal-Progressive member.

Born in Pickering, Yorkshire, the son of James Blakelock and Mary Bulman, he moved to Canada in 1906, establishing a lumber company with his brother James Bulman Blakelock. Blakelock sat on the town council for Oakville and was also deputy reeve, reeve and mayor, as well as warden of Halton County. In 1909, he married Isabel Parnaby. Blakelock was also building commissioner for the Oakville Board of Education. He died in 1974 and T. A. Blakelock High School was named in his honour.
