= William Kerns =

Canadian politician

Ontario MPP
- In office 1883–1898
- Preceded by: David Robertson
- Succeeded by: John Roaf Barber
- Constituency: Halton

Personal details
- Born: September 6, 1840 Nelson Township, Halton County, Upper Canada
- Died: March 6, 1913 (aged 72) Burlington, Ontario
- Party: Conservative
- Occupation: Businessman

William Kerns (September 6, 1840 – March 6, 1913) was an Ontario businessman and political figure. He represented Halton in the Legislative Assembly of Ontario from 1883 to 1898 as a Conservative member.

He was born in Nelson Township, Halton County, Upper Canada in 1840, the son of Nicholas Kerns, who came to Upper Canada from Germany. After Kerns completed his schooling, he entered business as a merchant, first partnering with John Waldie and later becoming sole owner of the business. He was also vice president of the Federal Life Insurance Company of Hamilton. In 1868, he married Ellen Morrison. Kerns served on the school board for ten years, as reeve for Burlington from 1879 to 1882 and from 1899 to 1905 and as chairman of the finance committee of Halton County. He was a lieutenant-colonel in the local militia and also was a member of the local Masonic lodge and a county master in the Orange Order. He died in 1913.
