= Ernest C. Drury =

Premier of Ontario

Ernest Charles Drury
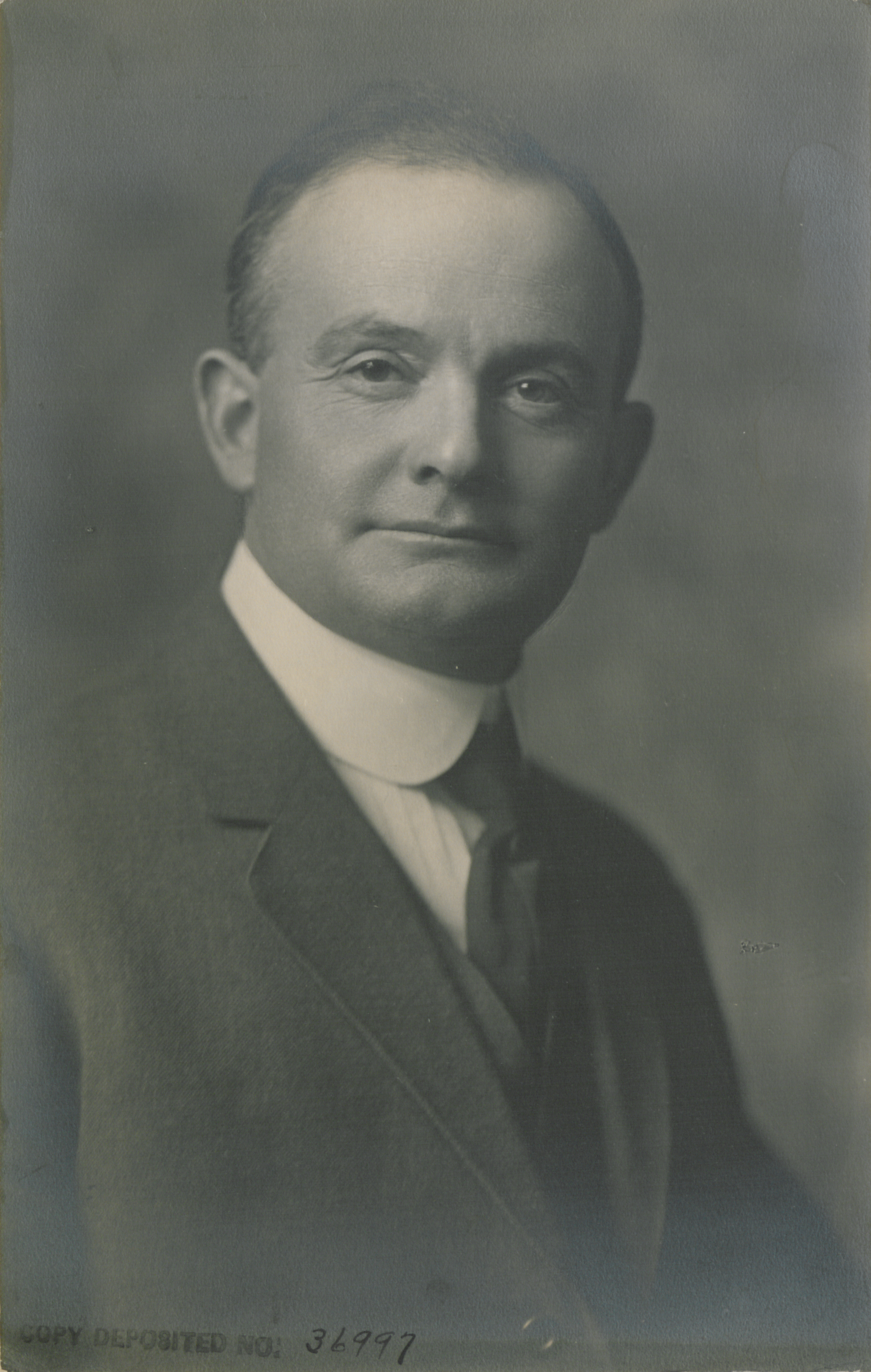
- Drury in 1920

8th Premier of Ontario
- In office November 14, 1919 – July 16, 1923
- Monarch: George V
- Lieutenant Governor: John Strathearn Hendrie; Lionel Herbert Clarke; Henry Cockshutt
- Preceded by: William Hearst
- Succeeded by: George Howard Ferguson

Ontario MPP
- In office February 16, 1920 – May 10, 1923
- Preceded by: John Featherstone Ford
- Succeeded by: George Hillmer
- Constituency: Halton

Personal details
- Born: January 22, 1878 Crown Hill, Ontario
- Died: February 17, 1968 (aged 90) Barrie, Ontario
- Resting place: Holy Cross St. Nektarios Greek Orthodox Church (formerly St. James Anglican Church), Springwater, Ontario
- Party: United Farmers of Ontario
- Spouse: Ella Partridge
- Education: Ontario Agricultural College

Ernest Charles Drury (January 22, 1878 – February 17, 1968) was a farmer, politician and writer who served as the eighth premier of Ontario, from 1919 to 1923 as the head of a United Farmers of Ontario–Labour coalition government.

Drury was the first premier of Ontario to have been born in the province after confederation.

== Family ==
Drury was the grandson of Richard Drury, who arrived in Crown Hill, Ontario, from Kenilworth, Warwickshire, England, in 1819.

His father, Charles Alfred Drury, continued the family farm and was a forward-looking farmer, who used new techniques and technologies. In 1882, he was president of the Agricultural and Arts Association of Ontario. He also served as reeve of Oro Township, in Simcoe County, for 13 years and was elected to the Ontario Legislature as an Ontario Liberal Party member. He served from 1882 to 1890, the last two years as Ontario's first Minister of Agriculture.

== Early career ==
Drury was an Opposition candidate in Simcoe North in the 1917 wartime election, which was held during the Conscription Crisis of 1917, but was defeated by the Government candidate. Conscription was the over-riding issue in this election; Drury believed that conscription was a "necessary evil," and always insisted that if men be drafted, so too should wealth be conscripted through heavier taxation.

== Premier of Ontario ==
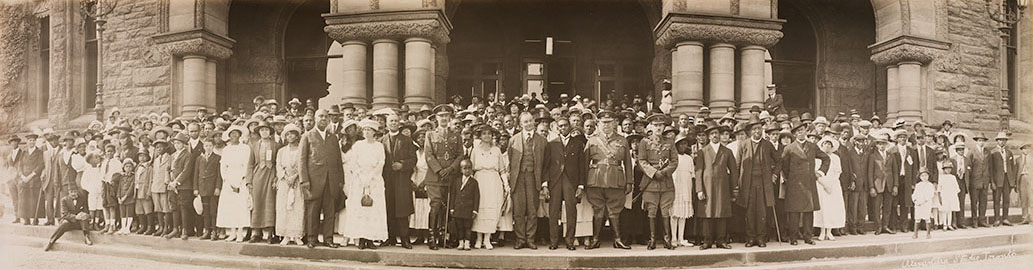
A group of mostly Black Canadians poses with Premier Drury and Sir Henry Pellatt on the steps of the Ontario Legislative Building in 1920.

Drury was a co-founder of the UFO in 1913 but did not run in the 1919 election, which returned farmer candidates as the largest bloc in the provincial legislature. Not having a leader, the UFO Members of the Legislative Assembly (MLAs) asked Drury to lead them and take the position of Premier. The UFOs 49 MLAs joined with 11 Labour members to form a coalition government. It was the first of a wave of United Farmers governments that took power in several provinces and that founded the Progressive Party of Canada.

Drury was elected to the Legislative Assembly in Halton in a 1920 by-election, after John Featherstone Ford, the sitting UFO MLA, had stepped aside. Drury faced Edward Stephenson of the Soldier Party (with both Liberals and Conservatives declining to contest the seat) and emerged victorious with 67.7% of the vote. Stephenson was critical of Drury's qualified support of conscription in 1917, but Drury acquitted himself well before the voters.

=== Achievements ===
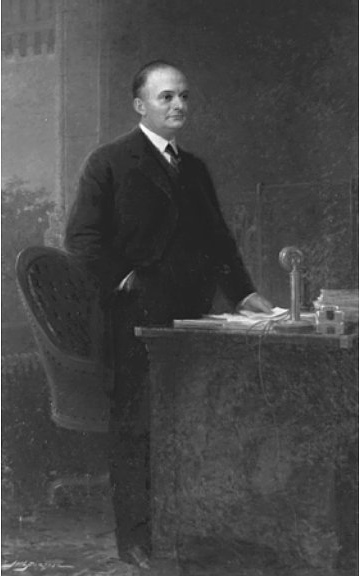
Drury in 1923

The Drury government had a significant impact on the Province:

- It introduced allowances for widows and children, a minimum wage for women, a mandatory weekly day of rest, broadened workmen's compensation benefits improved the support mechanisms for parents and children born out of wedlock, and standardized adoption procedures.
- Ontario Hydro saw greater expansion in the field of rural electrification and in 1921, Hydro acquired the Toronto Electric Light Company, together with various railway interests, thus making it the largest electric power system in the world.
- The Province of Ontario Savings Office was created, effectively a provincially-owned bank that was designed to lend money to farmers at a lower rate.
- It began the first major reforestation program in North America, and initiated construction of the modern highway system.
- Drury also arranged for a grant to Frederick Banting and Charles Best, at that time relatively unknown researchers, as a result of their discovery of insulin.

=== Temperance controversies ===
The government was also a strict enforcer of temperance measures, amidst mixed publicity. The newly-elected Labour MLA George Grant Halcrow was immediately convicted of violating the Ontario Temperance Act, which prevented him from receiving an expected appointment to the Cabinet. He became House Leader for the Labour Party but found himself at odds with Attorney-General William Raney over temperance by admitting, "I was an out-and-out wet in the Legislature."

When police and liquor officials were authorized to search automobiles and private yachts for illegal liquor, The Toronto Telegram observed that the only means of transportation where citizens could be free from search were "balloons and submarines". Another Act was passed which effectively prevented any movement of liquor within the Province, but it was later held not to prohibit exports to the United States.

In 1920, Reverend J. O. L. Spracklin, a Provincial Temperance enforcer, shot and killed an illicit liquor trader. The pastor, a strongly zealous and articulate personality, was acquitted of manslaughter, but the resultant publicity, generally linked with a major professed aim of Drury's administration, served to call the aim of rigorous temperance enforcement into question in the minds of many Ontarians.

At the same time, Drury personally grew an even more forceful commitment to temperance as his ministry progressed. When he went to the public with an election in 1923, he stressed that his ministry's efforts to enforce prohibition were the most important contribution it had made.

=== Ontario Hydro ===
Dougall Carmichael, appointed as Minister without Portfolio, was given the responsibility of being the government representative on the Hydro-Electric Power Commission of Ontario, and specifically with keeping its chairman Adam Beck in line. At one point in 1922, Carmichael announced to the Legislature that he was quitting his position as Commissioner because Hydro "was either inefficient or dishonest". He was forced to retract the allegation of dishonesty, and continued to be a Commissioner until the following year.

In 1920, responding to a campaign to have Hydro's rates made uniform, a Legislature committee headed by John G. Lethbridge proposed a levy of $2 per 1 horsepower (0.75 kW) on all electricity generated in the province in order to subsidize up to 80% of construction costs on rural transmission lines (whenever there was an average of three customers per mile of line). Beck rejected the idea of a levy, but put forward his own plan (which generated great controversy). An Act that favoured Beck's view, through subsidizing up to 50% of construction costs in the rural power zone, was passed in 1921, which effectively tightened Hydro's control over public distributors and denied payments to private electricity producers.

Hydro's plans for the promotion of interurban railways were significantly scaled back after the Sutherland Commission's report on the subject recommended it in 1921, and its affairs in general were the subject of the Gregory Commission appointed in 1922.

By battling with Beck and his plans for expansion of the province's hydro-electric system, Drury also alienated industrialists and many workers.

=== Forest policy ===
The Drury government investigated the administration of forest concessions granted under the previous Hearst administration, which had been directed by its minister Howard Ferguson, and passed an Act to provide for corrective measures with regard to permits that had been improperly issued.

A particular issue with Ferguson's previous actions was that he had sold timber limits to the Shevlin-Clarke Lumber Company (headed by fellow Conservative James Arthur Mathieu) for less than half the price they would have normally fetched, and the company later paid a fine of $1.5 million for breaching the Crown Timber Act. This transaction, as well as others, were criticized in a subsequent inquiry by the Latchford-Riddell Commission, which reported:

We are of the opinion that no officer, Minister or otherwise, should have the power to grant rights over large areas of the public domain at will without regard to Regulation; that power was never contemplated by the statutes; it does not at present exist, and should not be given to any individual. Such an arbitrary power subject to no control is obviously open to abuse.

Despite the amount of evidence gathered about the improper administration of forest lands (including Ferguson's self-professed arrogance in the matter) and the recommendations given as to how it should be improved, the industry and Ferguson launched a vigorous attack against the United Farmers. Ferguson described the Commission as "claptrap political conspiracy", accused Drury and Raney of "political knavery", and the UFO as "intellectual and political freaks who were projected into prominence by accident and who grew out of garbage". This scuttled any attempts at reform and helped to contribute to their later downfall.

=== Other difficulties ===
Many labour leaders distrusted a government dominated by farmers, feeling that they could not understand the problems of urban workers. Drury's failure to establish fair wage provisions in government contracts and his commitment to free trade that threatened the livelihood of industrial workers alienated urban workers further. Drury's Minimum Wage Act was the only significant piece of labour legislation passed by his ministry, although he also adjusted the Workmen's Compensation Act to be more generous to widows, and required journeymen electricians be employed in construction of hydro lines.

The government was opposed by all the major newspapers in the province, with the exception of the Toronto Star, and, despite its attempt to broaden its base, was opposed by business.

=== Fall from power ===
The government under Drury tried to be a "people's government" rather than a "class government", but in so doing, alienated the base of its support, particularly farmers. In a series of erratic events, the UFO government clashed with the uncooperative UFO organization (led by James J. Morrison throughout Drury's term) which ultimately withdrew its support.

The Drury government collapsed after it introduced bills in the Legislature that would have brought in proportional representation and a preferential ballot and Drury called an early election. The government was defeated when it ran for re-election in the 1923 provincial election, in part, due to false claims that Drury had used $100 to purchase a new solid-gold coal scuttle for his personal use. In fact, the device was an old brass scuttle which had been retrieved from storage and polished up. Drury never responded to the false claim, however, and it contributed to opposition claims of the government's extravagance. Also, Drury's ministry never developed a proper party organisation to support any electoral effort.

When asked what caused his ministry to fail before the voters, Drury would identify three causes: the Ontario Tempoerance Act, James J. Morrison's self-defeating opposition, and negative editorial coverage by the Toronto Globe newspaper

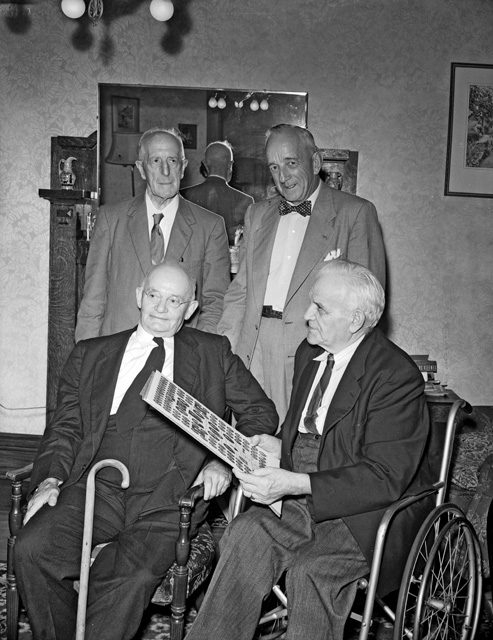
Last surviving members of the UFO–Labour coalition government (1919–1923) in 1955. From left to right: Harry Mills, E. C. Drury, Harry Nixon and Walter Rollo

=== Legacy ===
In the aftermath of their electoral defeat, the reputation of Drury's government was harmed by the Ontario Bond Scandal that resulted in Provincial Treasurer Peter Smith being jailed.

The people of Ontario quickly consigned Drury's ministry to oblivion; the short-lived premiership, if remembered at all, is considered largely inconsequential.

Charles M. Johnston summarised the Drury ministry thusly: "It was the perceived values and standards of a Victorian yesterday that Drury and his colleagues soght to entrench through the actions of their government."

== Later life ==
Drury retired from politics but later ran as a federal candidate. Unlike many other members of the UFO, he never joined either the Liberal Party of Canada or the Co-operative Commonwealth Federation.

Drury was active with the Progressive Party of Canada following the demise of his provincial government. He ran as a Progressive candidate in Simcoe North in the 1925 Canadian federal election, 1926 and 1930 federal elections but was defeated by Conservative candidates by margins of 600, 200 and 800 votes respectively.

=== Local government ===
In 1934, he was appointed sheriff and registrar of Simcoe County, a position which he held until 1959, when he retired as an octogenarian. A portrait of Drury is still displayed prominently at the local courthouse in Barrie.

=== Writings ===
He wrote for magazines such as Maclean's and also wrote two local histories of Simcoe County. He did not write his memoirs until 1966.

In June 2019, the city of Barrie published a poem of Drury’s entitled An Ode to Freedom in Canada along with interviews with his descendants on a website called Barrie Today.com.

Drury remained interested in political matters. During the debate on whether or not Canada should install American-operated nuclear-tipped Bomarc missiles in the 1960s, Drury wrote "the next government of Canada... should refuse to accept nuclear arms. The whole nuclear program of the United States is dangerous."

== Recognition ==
In 2011, the Ontario Heritage Trust erected a marker at Drury's gravesite, as part of its Premiers' Gravesites Program.

There was a secondary school, E. C. Drury High School, which was closed and replaced by Craig Kielburger Secondary School in 2012. The provincial E. C. Drury School for the Deaf is still in operation in Milton, Ontario.

== See also ==
- James J. Morrison#Collapse of Drury government
- William Raney#Close involvement with Ontario Temperance Act
- J. O. L. Spracklin#Prohibition controversies and events of 1920

Party political offices
| Preceded by none | Leader of the United Farmers of Ontario; 1919–1924 | Succeeded by Manning Doherty |
