= George Albert Kerr =

Canadian politician

George Kerr
- Born: January 27, 1924; Montreal, Quebec
- Died: May 21, 2007 (aged 83); Burlington, Ontario
- Occupation: Lawyer
- Political party: Progressive Conservative
- Spouse: Merrydith Kerr
- Children: 3

Member of the Ontario Provincial Parliament for Burlington South Halton West (1967-1975) Halton (1963-1967)
- In office 1963–1985
- Preceded by: Stanley Hall
- Succeeded by: Cam Jackson

Executive Council of Ontario cabinet positions:

Minister of Energy and Resource Management
- In office June 5, 1969 – July 23, 1971
- Premier: John Robarts, Bill Davis
- Preceded by: John Simonett
- Succeeded by: Darcy McKeough

Minister of the Environment
- In office July 23, 1971 – February 2, 1972
- Premier: Bill Davis
- Preceded by: Position established
- Succeeded by: James Auld
- In office October 7, 1975 – January 21, 1978
- Preceded by: Bill Newman
- Succeeded by: George McCague

Minister of Colleges and Universities
- In office February 2, 1972 – September 28, 1972
- Premier: Bill Davis
- Preceded by: John White
- Succeeded by: Jack McNie

Provincial Secretary for Justice
- In office February 2, 1972 – February 26, 1974
- Premier: Bill Davis
- Preceded by: Allan Lawrence
- Succeeded by: Bob Welch
- In office January 21, 1978 – August 18, 1978
- Preceded by: John MacBeth
- Succeeded by: Bob Welch

Ontario Solicitor General
- In office February 26, 1974 – February 21, 1975
- In office July 9, 1975 – October 7, 1978
- Premier: Bill Davis
- Interim: John Clement
- Preceded by: John Yaremko
- Succeeded by: John MacBeth
- In office January 21, 1978 – Sept. 9, 1978
- Preceded by: John MacBeth
- Succeeded by: Roy McMurtry

George Albert Kerr (January 27, 1924 – May 21, 2007) was a politician in Ontario, Canada. He served in the Legislative Assembly of Ontario from 1963 to 1985, and was a cabinet minister in the governments of John Robarts and Bill Davis. Kerr was a member of the Progressive Conservative Party and was the first person to hold the portfolio of environment minister in any provincial cabinet in Canada.

== Background ==
He was born in Montreal, Quebec, and educated at the University of New Brunswick and Dalhousie Law School. He worked as a lawyer.

== Political career ==
He served on the town council of Burlington, Ontario, from 1955 to 1957 and from 1960 to 1962.

Kerr was elected to the Ontario legislature in the 1963 provincial election, defeating Liberal Party candidate Owen Mullin by 6,372 votes in Halton. He served as a backbench supporter of Robarts's government for four years, and was re-elected in the 1967 election. He was appointed to cabinet on June 5, 1969, as Minister of Energy and Resources Management.

Kerr was the only cabinet minister to support Darcy McKeough's bid to succeed Robarts as party leader at the 1971 Progressive Conservative Party leader leadership convention. McKeough was eliminated on the second-last ballot, and, with Kerr, gave his support to Bill Davis. Davis won the contest, and initially retained Kerr in the Energy and Resources Management portfolio.

=== As energy and resources minister ===
As the Minister of Energy and Resources Management, Kerr oversaw the Ontario government's response to the discharge of about 10,000 kilograms (22,000 lb) of mercury from the Dryden Chemical Company's chloralkali plant, into the headwaters of the 235 km (146 mi)-long Wabigoon River on Lake Wabigoon in the Kenora District of Northwestern Ontario from 1962 until 1970, which caused mercury contamination in the region's lakes and rivers. The mercury poisoning rendered the walleye, the cornerstone of the local fishing-based economy and the staple food of the indigenous communities in the area, unsafe to eat. The spill was detected in early 1970. Kerr ordered on April 6, 1970 the closure of all commercial fisheries in the area. He further declared in August 1970 to inquiring journalists that the mercury would "flush out" in twenty-one weeks, implying that the Wabigoon river would recover naturally without government intervention or a clean up. In a remembrance speech made in the legislature in Kerr's honour in 2010, Conservative MPP Norm Sterling (who served as environment and energy minister in 1990s) noted that when Kerr was asked internally later by his ministry officials privately about the source of the time estimate, Kerr said he simply made it up, and quoted Kerr as saying, "If I had said it was going to be flushed out in one or two years, they would never have believed me." Sterling's words were "met with laughter in the Ontario parliament".

In 1970, Kerr attended a ground breaking ceremony of a water treatment plant in Hamilton with federal energy minister Joe Greene, during which he promised to swim in the Burlington Bay to show that the polluted water was being cleaned up. Acknowledging five years later thaat the pledge was "a bit of a one upmanship" and that no part of the bay water was yet suitable for recreational swimming by the public, he nonetheless declared that he was satisfied that the water quality have improved sufficiently for him to fulfill the pledge, and on August 23, 1975 took a ten-minute swim in the Bay with Oakville councillor Arch Donaghey while local press and municipal leaders gathered to watch.

=== Three shuffles in a year ===
On July 23, 1971, he was named Minister of the Environment, the second such Cabinet minister in Canada. (Note: George Kerr was preceded on June 11, 1971, by Jack Davis, the first federal Minister of the Environment.)

Following the 1971 election, Kerr was named as Minister of Colleges and Universities in October 1971, a portfolio Premier Davis held prior his assumption of the party leadership.

On September 28, 1972 he was again transferred to become Provincial Secretary for Justice. This post was a "super-ministry", overseeing the offices of the Attorney-General, the Solicitor General, the Minister of Correctional Services and the Minister of Consumer and Corporate Affairs. While a strong position in theory, the office lacked defined administrative objectives, and ministers who held the position were often marginalized in legislative debates.

In the major cabinet shuffle that took place on February 26, 1974, Kerr was re-assigned as Solicitor General.

=== 1975 Hamilton Harbour Commission scandal ===
In 1974, the RCMP charged Hamilton Harbour commissioner Ken Elliott and four associates with fraud, conspiracy and uttering forged documents for unnecessary dredging work, as well as bid rigging on government contracts, and kickback payments. The matter rocked the political world, implicating cabinet members of the federal, Ontario and Quebec governments. During preliminary hearing for the criminal trial, it was revealed that Elliott alleged that Kerr and the other two commissioners, both associates of local MP and federal minister John Munro, solicited and received money relating to the dredging work while Kerr was the environment minister. Kerr protested his innocence but resigned from cabinet on February 21, 1975, on the ground that he could not function as the province's chief law enforcement officer with such an allegation outstanding. It was later revealed that Kerr initially took the position that resignation was not warranted and counter-offered to be shuffled to a ministry not relating to law enforcement, but that Premier Davis insisted on his ouster in anticipation of government ethnics being made a core campaign issue by the Liberals in the general election to be held later that year. Both expected the matter to resolved quickly, and Premier Davis named Attorney General John Clement as interim Solicitor General rather than a permanent replacement.

While Kerr was called to be a witness at the criminal trial, he was never criminally charged and therefore had little influence over of the timing of the criminal matter and could not be certain that any pronouncement of his innocence would be made at the conclusion of the trial. RCMP investigators testified during the trial that the allegations against Kerr and the two associates of federal minister John Munro were not corroborated by any other evidence and were never considered credible. Kerr remained out of cabinet while the two-month long trial unfolded over the summer. Acknowledging the far-reaching impact of the matter to senior politicians in Ottawa, Queen's Park and Quebec City, the judge in delivering his verdict noted that, "(T)here was not a shred of evidence other than Elliott's word against any of the three... from the evidence they had no part whatever in this affair. They had nothing to do with any of the improprieties before this court," and specifically acknowledged that they had unduly suffered reputational damage and abuse. Kerr was readmitted to cabinet and resumed his role as Solicitor General on July 9, 1975.

=== Returned to old portfolios ===
Kerr was re-elected for the new constituency of Burlington South in the 1975 provincial election, during which the Progressive Conservatives were reduced to a minority government. Attorney General John Clement was among the cabinet casualties but Kerr was not tapped for the post as many have expected. In the post-election cabinet shuffle on October 7, he was returned to the environment ministry. He held this position until January 21, 1978, when he was again named Solicitor General and Provincial Secretary for Justice.

He resigned a second time as Solicitor General on Sept. 9, 1978 after revelation of a telephone call he made to an assistant crown attorney on behalf of a constituent who was facing trial for driving while his licence was suspended.

While Kerr was re-elected in the 1981 provincial election, he remained on the government backbench for his remaining time in the legislature. He retired from the legislature in 1985.

=== Public offices held ===
Legislative Assembly of Ontario
Preceded by Stanley Hall	MPP for Burlington South; 1963–1985 (Halton West 1967–75; Halton 1963-67)	Succeeded by Cam Jackson
Robarts ministry, Province of Ontario (1961–1971)
Davis ministry, Province of Ontario (1971–1985)
Preceded by John Simonett	Minister of Energy and Resource Management; 1969-1971	Succeeded by Darcy McKeough as Minister of Energy
New office	Minister of the Environment; 1971–1972; 1975–1978	Succeeded by James Auld
Preceded by Bill Newman	Minister of the Environment; 1971–1972; 1975–1978	Succeeded by George McCague
Preceded by John White	Minister of Colleges and Universities; February–September 1972	Succeeded by Jack McNie
Preceded by Allan Lawrence	Provincial Secretary for Justice; 1972–1974; January–August 1978	Succeeded by Bob Welch
Preceded by John MacBeth	Provincial Secretary for Justice; 1972–1974; January–August 1978	Succeeded by Bob Welch
Preceded by John Yaremko	Solicitor General; February 1974 – February 1975; July–October 1975; January–September 1978	Succeeded by John Clement, interim
Preceded by John Clement, interim	Solicitor General; February 1974 – February 1975; July–October 1975; January–September 1978	Succeeded by John MacBeth
Preceded by John MacBeth	Solicitor General; February 1974 – February 1975; July–October 1975; January–September 1978	Succeeded by Roy McMurtry

== Death ==
Kerr died on Victoria Day, May 21, 2007, at Joseph Brant Hospital in Burlington.

A few years later, the Ontario legislature allocated time on April 28, 2010 for tribute speeches in honour of Kerr, during which Liberal Jim Bradley and PC Norm Sterling, both having served with Kerr and both Kerr's successors as environment ministers, and NDP member Gilles Bisson spoke on behalf of their respective parties, along with then MPP for Burlington Joyce Savoline.
