= Henry James Morgan =

Canadian civil servant, lawyer, author and editor

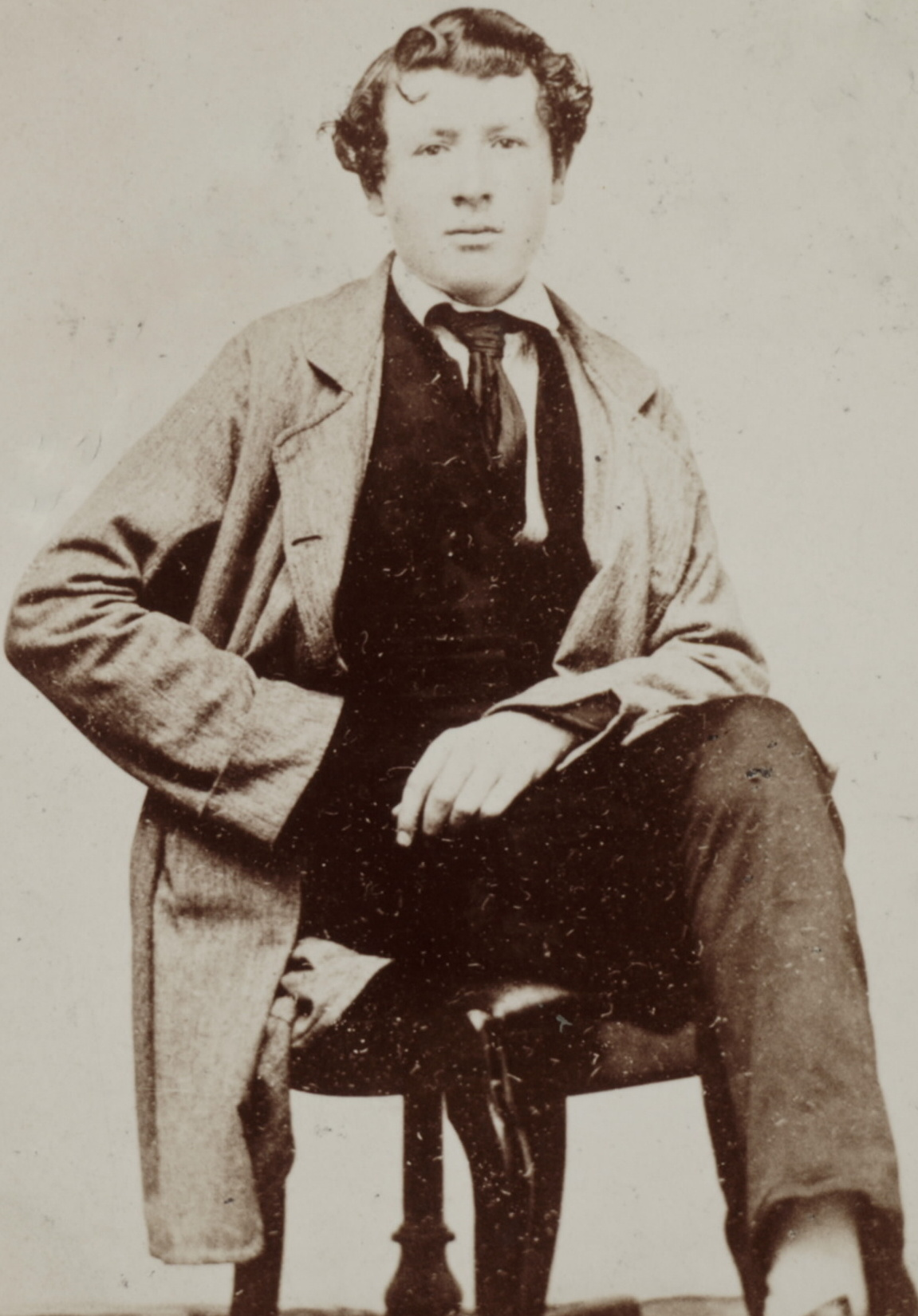
- Born: November 14, 1842; Quebec City, Canada East
- Died: December 27, 1913 (aged 71); Brockville, Ontario
- Writing career
- Genre: Biography

Henry James Morgan (November 14, 1842 – December 27, 1913) was a Canadian civil servant, lawyer, author and editor, probably best known for publishing collections of biographical sketches of notable Canadians.

The son of Robert Morgan, a Scottish veteran of the Napoleonic Wars, and Mary Ann Proctor, he was born in Quebec City. His father died in 1846 and Morgan began work as a page in the Legislative Assembly of the Province of Canada in 1853. During the late 1850s, he also was a correspondent for several newspapers. From 1860 to 1864, he worked as a sessional clerk for the assembly. Morgan was private secretary for Isaac Buchanan and then William McDougall. After Confederation, he was employed as a clerk with the Canadian Department of the Secretary of State. Around this time, he also studied law at McGill College and was called to the Quebec and Ontario bars in 1873. Also in 1873, Morgan was promoted to first-class clerk and was put in charge of the country's state records; he was promoted to chief clerk in 1875. In 1888, he was demoted to first-class clerk after he was accused of misappropriation of funds; Morgan was later cleared of this charge. He retired from the civil service in 1895.

In 1873, Morgan married Emily Richards. The couple had three sons and a daughter.

In 1862, he published Sketches of celebrated Canadians. From 1862 to 1876, Morgan was editor for the Canadian Parliamentary Companion, the predecessor to the Canadian Parliamentary Guide. In 1867, he published the Bibliotheca canadensis, which included biographies and published works for Canadian authors between 1763 and 1867. From 1878 to 1886, he was responsible to the production of The Dominion Annual Register and Review. Morgan published The Canadian Men and Women of the Time in 1898.

Morgan was a founding member of the Canada First movement. In 1904, he was named to the Royal Society of Canada.

He died in Brockville at the age of 71 and is buried in Beechwood Cemetery in Ottawa.

In 2016, Morgan was named a Person of National Historic Significance by the Canadian government.
