= Barza Radio Community =

- Formation: November 2011
- Type: Online Community
- Purpose: Rural development
- Region served: Africa
- Official language: English & French
- Parent organization: Farm Radio International
- Website: http://www.barzaradio.com/

Barza Radio Community was a social networking website for African radio broadcasters developed by Farm Radio International in conjunction with International Development Research Centre and the Technical Centre for Agricultural and Rural Cooperation ACP-EU (CTA) to help them share scripts and other radio content with each other, and develop their broadcasting skills.

== Background ==
Farm Radio International started forming networks of broadcasters to share information and research back in the 1970s.

Barza is a French-Congolese word with Swahili roots which means, “The place where people in a village meet under a tree to talk and sort out questions concerning the community.”

== The Platform ==
The Barza website includes news, blogs, comments, discussion forums, and content sharing features. Users can upload their own radio and farming related content, specifically radio scripts, events, photos, video, and audio. Resources are organised by topic, such as climate change, food processing and storage, water and sanitation, market information, broadcasting techniques, gender, malaria, HIV/AIDs, etc. There is also a French website for Barza. Broadcasters have their own profile page and there is a Barza Café discussions page where users can participate in various discussions.
