= John Featherstone Ford =

Canadian politician from Ontario

Member of the Ontario Provincial Parliament for Halton
- In office October 20, 1919 – January 20, 1920
- Preceded by: Alfred Westland Nixon
- Succeeded by: Ernest Charles Drury

Personal details
- Born: August 15, 1862 Omagh, Canada West
- Died: March 17, 1946 (aged 83) Trafalgar, Ontario
- Party: United Farmers

John Featherstone Ford was a Canadian politician from Ontario.

First elected as a councillor in Trafalgar Township, Ontario in 1896, he would later rise to become Reeve of the Township and Warden of Halton County. He would later represent Halton in the Legislative Assembly of Ontario from 1919 until his resignation in 1920, when he stepped aside to allow E.C. Drury to be elected after being named Premier of Ontario. He would later stand as a Progressive candidate for Halton in 1921, coming in third. His campaign had been hampered by controversies arising from Drury's administration.

== See also ==
- 15th Parliament of Ontario
