= George Hillmer =

Canadian politician

Ontario MPP
- In office 1923–1929
- Preceded by: Ernest Charles Drury
- Succeeded by: Thomas Aston Blakelock
- Constituency: Halton

Mayor of Oakville
- In office 1910–1912
- Preceded by: W.S. Davis
- Succeeded by: I.T. Madden

Personal details
- Born: December 5, 1866 Oakville, Canada West
- Died: January 20, 1935 (aged 68) Hamilton, Ontario
- Party: Conservative
- Spouse: Pauline Bradbury
- Profession: Businessman

George Hillmer (1866 – 1935) was an Ontario merchant and political figure. He represented Halton in the Legislative Assembly of Ontario from 1923 to 1929 as a Conservative member.

He was born on December 5, 1866, in Oakville, Canada West the son of Edward Hillmer and Jean Titherington. Hillmer originally operated a delivery service and livery stable but later became the proprietor of a Ford agency. In 1894, he married Pauline Bradbury. Hillmer was a member of the town council for Oakville, serving as mayor from 1910 to 1912 and serving eight years as reeve. He defeated Ernest Charles Drury to win a seat in the provincial assembly in 1923. Hillmer was a Master Mason.

He died on January 30, 1935.
