= Ontario Federation of Agriculture =

- Type: Agricultural organization
- Purpose: Agriculture
- Location: Guelph, Ontario
- Region served: Ontario
- Method: Lobbying
- Key people: Drew Spoelstra, President
- Website: www.ofa.on.ca
- Formerly called: Ontario Chamber of Agriculture

The Ontario Federation of Agriculture (OFA) is one of three general farm organizations in the province of Ontario that represent the agricultural sector to government, stakeholders and the public. OFA is headquartered in Guelph, Ontario.

Governance

OFA is governed by a Board of Directors of 18. There are 51 county and regional federations of agriculture, providing local representation across Ontario.

Board of Directors

OFA is governed by an 18-member elected Board of Directors consisting of Ontario farmers from across the province. Directors represent 15 geographical zones with three holding at-large positions. Directors are elected for a three-year term. The President, two Vice President positions and the Executive Member are elected annually by the Board on a one-year term. All Executive positions are elected by the Board immediately following the Annual General Meeting. Drew Spoelstra was elected as the new OFA President at the 2023 Annual General Meeting, held in Toronto, Ontario. Spoelstra assumes the presidency from outgoing OFA president Peggy Brekveld who held the position for three years. Joining Spoelstra on the OFA Executive Committee are Vice Presidents Sara Wood and Paul Vickers, and Executive Member Ethan Wallace.

Policy Advisory Council

OFA's Policy Advisory Council (PAC) is an elected body of members that meet approximately four times per year. The PAC consists of 90 members providing grassroots input on issues and policy direction, including representation from each county and commodity organizations.

Staff

OFA staff and Member Service Representatives (MSR) are located in the head office in Guelph, Ontario and across the province.

History

Established in 1936, the Ontario Federation of Agriculture (OFA) was founded by the United Farmers of Ontario, the United Farmers’ Co-operative Company Ltd., and various growers and other agricultural organizations as a non-partisan lobbying and marketing organization for farmers. In January 27, 1936, representatives of Ontario’s farm groups held a meeting at the Royal York Hotel in Toronto in response to the creation of the Canadian Chamber of Agriculture in 1935, later renamed the Canadian Federation of Agriculture. The new organization was created to establish a provincial brand, named the Ontario Agricultural Conference. The first chairman was Herbert H. Hannam.

In 1940, it changed its name to the Ontario Federation of Agriculture. In 1943, the United Farmers of Ontario dissolved and its remnants were absorbed by the OFA.

== See also ==
- United Farmers of Ontario
