= Ned Corbett =

Pioneer adult educator in Canada

- Born: Edward Annand Corbett; April 12, 1884; Truro, Nova Scotia, Canada
- Died: October 28, 1964 (aged 80); Toronto, Ontario, Canada
- Education: McGill University (BA, MA)
- Occupation: Educator
- Spouse: Anna Rae Dickson (m. 1912)
- Children: 3

Edward Annand Corbett (April 12, 1884 – October 28, 1964) was an innovator and pioneer adult educator in Canada. Born on April 12, 1884, in Truro, Nova Scotia to Rev. Thomas Corbett and Agnes Harriett (Crowe) Corbett his early life included moves to Tyne Valley, Prince Edward Island; Blackville, New Brunswick and Rockburn, Quebec.

Working his way through university as a salesman of stereoscopic photographs in Quebec and a horseback-tourist guide for the Banff Springs Hotel, he completed a BA in theology in 1912, and a MA, from McGill University.

During World War I, he assisted Henry Marshall Tory in establishing the Khaki College in Sussex, England, which offered Canadian soldiers opportunity to develop skills like bookkeeping, animal husbandry, and English. In 1921 his wartime mentor who was acting President of the University of Alberta, offered Corbett a position in the University Extension Department, as assistant to its director, A.E. Ottewell, whom he later succeeded in 1927. As director of University of Alberta's Extension Department get involved with establishing the university's radio station, CKUA - a pioneer in using new media in the vast province for educational purposes. The program has been credited as Canada's first educational broadcaster and Canada's first public broadcaster.

Corbett lists of involvement within Alberta were wide including president of the Alberta Drama League and founding director of the Banff School of the Arts (1933).

By 1935 his scope had widened to the national level and he was instrumental in the establishment of the Canadian Association for Adult Education (CAAE), becoming the first director. His focus on citizenship education, rural adult education, and Canadian nationalism were all key interests during a time covering the Great Depression, World War II, and the post-war period. The period was one of major change when the shift from rural to urban living was having a significant impact on Canadians. Over this time he shaped the CAAE into a highly effective and significant Canadian institution.

Drawing on his early radio experience as an educational tool Corbett's worked with the Canadian Broadcasting Corporation (CBC), the National Film Board (NFB) as well as Canada's Wartime Information Board, and is credited as the creative force behind the popular CBC broadcasts, National Farm Radio Forum (Farm Forum) which ran from 1941 to 1965 that grew out of the New Canada Movement.

One of his most creative contributions to Canadian adult education was with John Robbins, secretary of the Canadian Council on Education for Citizenship: The Joint Planning Commission (1947) described as one of the most notable and successful features of adult education at the national level in Canada. In 1949, Corbett headed the Canadian delegation to the first UNESCO World Conference on Adult Education held in Denmark.

After retirement from the CAAE in 1951, Corbett continued writing on topics of Canadian history and biography. A tribute to his father and family live Father God Bless Him (1953), describes his childhood years in Eastern Canada. He also wrote a biography of his early mentor, Henry Marshall Tory (1954) and an autobiography, We Have With Us Tonight (1957).

Ned Corbett married Anna Rae Dickson on June 3, 1912, in Seaforth, Ontario. They had three children during their marriage. Their eldest son Bruce Sherwood Corbett died on November 8, 1944, in action while serving with Royal Canadian Air Force. Ned died on October 28, 1964, in Toronto, Ontario, at the age of 80.

== Selected publications ==
- Corbett, E.A. (1957). We have with us tonight. Toronto: The Ryerson Press.
- Faris, R. (1975). The passionate educators. Toronto: Peter Martin Associates Ltd.
- Kidd, J.R. (1950). Adult education in Canada. Toronto: Canadian Association for Adult Education
- Selman, G. R. (1995) Adult education in Canada: Historical essays. Toronto: Thompson Educational Publishing
