= Burlington South (provincial electoral district) =

Former provincial electoral district in Ontario, Canada

Burlington South was a provincial electoral district in Ontario, Canada. It was abolished prior to the 1999 election into Burlington and Ancaster—Dundas—Flamborough—Aldershot. For the 1987, 1990, and 1995 provincial elections it consisted of the city of Burlington south of the Queen Elizabeth Way and Highway 403, except the southeastern corner: east of Appleby Line and south of New Street.

== List of Members ==
1. George Kerr, Progressive Conservatives (1975–1985)
2. Cam Jackson, Progressive Conservatives (1985–1999)

== Election results ==
1995 Ontario general election
Party	Candidate	Votes	%	±%
Progressive Conservative	Cam Jackson	24,831	72.56	+20.02
Liberal	Ray Rivers	5,415	15.82	–1.23
New Democratic	David Miles	3,507	10.25	–14.92
Family Coalition	Emidio Corvaro	470	1.37	–3.88
Total valid votes		34,223	99.27	
Total rejected, unmarked and declined ballots		253	0.73	–0.70
Turnout		34,476	69.20	–0.28
Eligible voters		49,821		
Progressive Conservative hold		Swing		+10.62
Source: Elections Ontario

1990 Ontario general election
Party	Candidate	Votes	%	±%
Progressive Conservative	Cam Jackson	17,084	52.53	+11.21
New Democratic	Robert Wood	8,185	25.17	+10.21
Liberal	Marven Townsend	5,544	17.05	–22.35
Family Coalition	Donald Pennell	1,707	5.25	+1.66
Total valid votes		32,520	98.57	
Total rejected, unmarked and declined ballots		472	1.43	+1.01
Turnout		32,992	69.48	+1.85
Eligible voters		47,486		
Progressive Conservative hold		Swing		+0.50
Source: Elections Ontario

1987 Ontario general election
Party	Candidate	Votes	%	±%
Progressive Conservative	Cam Jackson	12,968	41.33	–0.79
Liberal	Bill Priestner	12,363	39.40	+9.18
New Democratic	Judy Worsley	4,694	14.96	–12.70
Family Coalition	Donald Pennell	1,125	3.59	–
Libertarian	Dan Riga	228	0.73	–
Total valid votes		31,378	99.57	
Total rejected ballots		134	0.43	–0.09
Turnout		31,512	67.63	+4.67
Eligible voters		46,596		
Progressive Conservative hold		Swing		–4.99
Source: Elections Ontario

1985 Ontario general election
Party	Candidate	Votes	%	±%
Progressive Conservative	Cam Jackson	16,479	42.12	–15.68
Liberal	Doug Redfearn	11,822	30.22	+3.03
New Democratic	Walter Mulkewich	10,820	27.66	+12.65
Total valid votes		39,121	99.48	
Total rejected ballots		203	0.52	–0.10
Turnout		39,324	62.96	+7.39
Eligible voters		62,459		
Progressive Conservative hold		Swing		–9.36
Source: Elections Ontario

1981 Ontario general election
Party	Candidate	Votes	%	±%
Progressive Conservative	George Albert Kerr	19,037	57.81	+6.74
Liberal	Pearl Cameron	8,953	27.19	–1.12
New Democratic	Michael Charles Wright	4,942	15.01	–3.95
Total valid votes		32,932	99.39	
Total rejected ballots		203	0.61	+0.24
Turnout		33,135	55.57	–10.10
Eligible voters		59,626		
Progressive Conservative hold		Swing		+3.93
Source: Elections Ontario

1977 Ontario general election
Party	Candidate	Votes	%	±%
Progressive Conservative	George Albert Kerr	18,892	51.06	+5.23
Liberal	John O'Boyle	10,474	28.31	–2.10
New Democratic	Bill Brown	7,015	18.96	–4.79
Libertarian	John Lawson	615	1.66	–
Total valid votes		36,996	99.63	
Total rejected ballots		138	0.37	+0.10
Turnout		37,134	65.67	–3.78
Eligible voters		56,545		
Progressive Conservative hold		Swing		+3.67
Source: Elections Ontario

1975 Ontario general election
Party	Candidate	Votes	%
Progressive Conservative	George Albert Kerr	17,093	45.83
Liberal	Donald Pennell	11,342	30.41
New Democratic	Bill Brown	8,859	23.75
Total valid votes		37,294	99.73
Total rejected ballots		102	0.27
Turnout		37,396	69.46
Eligible voters		53,842	
Progressive Conservative pickup new district.			
Source: Elections Ontario

== See also ==
- List of Ontario provincial electoral districts
- Canadian provincial electoral districts
