= Halton baronets =

Extinct baronetcy in the Baronetage of England

The Halton Baronetcy, of Samford Parva in the County of Essex, was a title in the Baronetage of England. It was created on 10 September 1642 for William Halton. The title became extinct on the death of the sixth Baronet on 9 February 1823 aged 77.

== Halton baronets, of Samford (1642) ==
Escutcheon of the Halton baronets of Samford

- Sir William Halton, 1st Baronet (c. 1620 – 1662)
- Sir William Halton, 2nd Baronet (died 1675)
- Sir Thomas Halton, 3rd Baronet (died 1726)
- Sir William Halton, 4th Baronet (died 1754)
- Sir Thomas Halton, 5th Baronet (died 1766)
- Sir William Halton, 6th Baronet (c. 1746 – 1823)
