= Esquesing Township =

Geographic township in Regional Municipality of Halton, Ontario, Canada

Coordinates: 43°37′01″N 79°56′25″W

Esquesing Township was a municipality within the historic Halton County in Ontario, Canada. It is today a geographic township, mostly within the town of Halton Hills, with its southwest corner being part of the Town of Milton in the Regional Municipality of Halton.

== Territorial development ==
The township of Esquesing (Note: area 66,700 acres (104 sq mi; 270 km^{2})) was surveyed in 1818 and opened to settlement the following year. Its name was said to come from a First Nations word meaning "the land of the tall pine(s)", but is more likely to come from the Mississauga word ishkwessin, meaning "that which lies at the end", which was the original name for Bronte Creek. The grid pattern of lines and sideroads that define the landscape of the township to this day, is often interrupted by the rugged cliffs of the Niagara Escarpment, the deep Credit River valley or the headwaters of Sixteen Mile Creek. It was this natural beauty that drew the Hurons first and then the Mississaugas to hunt, fish and live in this area.

The Township was organized into a municipality, and its council held its meetings at Stewarttown. The principal road to Lake Ontario was Trafalgar Road so development of several settlements began along this route first. A more direct route to York was established by the York to Guelph Road, now Highway 7. In that era, these hamlets provided the essential services for pioneers and travelers. It was the arrival of the Railway in 1856 that changed the landscape and provided the stimulus for the urban development of Georgetown and Acton.

Esquesing Township Council governed the remaining communities:

- Glen Williams, north of Georgetown on the Credit River. Many tourists visit the Williams Mill complex. However, the village was known for its woolen products from 1839 until 1982.
- Stewarttown, location of the township hall, became known by Lawson’s flour and saw mills.
- Norval on Highway 7 adjacent to Peel Region was famous across the Dominion of Canada for their fine flour produced from the mills in the village.
- Limehouse, between Acton and Georgetown, was known for its lime products burned from the limestone on which it was built. The lime kiln and mill ruins attract hikers through the village today.
- Scotch Block, considered the most ethnically homogeneous region in the county, its first settlers "Scottish almost without exception".

== Municipal evolution ==
The first township meeting was held in 1821 when the population was 424.

Over the years, two parts of the Township were constituted as separate municipalities:

- Acton: incorporated as a village in 1874, and erected into a town in 1950. The Rev. Zenas and Ezra Adams were responsible for the founding of a village, first known as Adamsville before acquiring its present name in 1844. It was the leather industry that defined Acton from its earliest days. The Storey Glove factory was the largest employer for many years, but in the 20th century, the largest employer was the Beardmore Tannery. It became the largest tannery in the British Empire. (Note: The leather industry still defines Acton, even though the tannery closed in 1986.)
- Georgetown: incorporated as a village in 1864, and erected into a town in 1921. George Kennedy founded Georgetown with a flour mill and foundry. However, it was the Barber Brothers who put the village on the map. The railway prompted them to build a paper mill, becoming the largest employer. By the turn of the 20th century, Georgetown had three paper mills which earned it the name of "Papertown". About 100 years after Georgetown’s railway growth, came the idea of a model community built by Rex Heslop. The huge Delrex community sprawled south of old Georgetown. Finally, an even larger development began south of the Silver Creek Valley about 1989. That development, carried out by several builders continues to this day.

On January 1, 1974, Halton County was reorganized to become the Regional Municipality of Halton. As a consequence, Esquesing (excepting a southwestern portion annexed to the Town of Milton), Acton and Georgetown were amalgamated to form the new Town of Halton Hills.

== Organization of schools ==
The Parliament of Upper Canada originally passed legislation in 1816 providing for each district of the Province to have a board of education, and for each common school to be governed by its own school trustees. By 1862, the township had 16 schools at the following locations:

- In Concession 2, at lots 6 and 22
- In Concession 4, at lots 13 and 32
- In Concession 5, at lots 6 and 28
- In Concession 6, at lot 21
- In Concession 7, at lot 29 and at Hornby
- In Concession 8, at lots 8 and 22, and at Stewarttown
- In Concession 10, at lots 6 and 29
- One at Norval, and one at Georgetown

Esquesing was eventually divided into school sections for each of its common schools (although their dates of establishment are uncertain):

1. Ligny
2. Quatre Bras
3. Ashgrove
4. Pinegrove
5. Waterloo
6. Stewarttown
7. Norval
8. Dublin
9. Gibraltar
10. Dufferin
11. Glen Williams
12. Lorne
13. Bannockburn
14. Blue Mountain
15. Clay Hill
16. Mount Pleasant
17. Milton Heights

AE. Hornby

Before 1882, the Lorne school section #12 was united with the Village of Acton in the Acton School Division. That division was dissolved by a bylaw adopted by the Township.

This system of governance would continue unchanged until the 1940s. Talks began in 1944 to amalgamate some of the school sections into a single school area board, and action was taken in 1945 to merge seven sections, and an eighth section came on board before the end of the year. Two more sections were included in 1947, and the remainder joined at dates as late as 1956, 1961 and 1962.

The network of one-room schools would be consolidated into several central schools during the 1950s and 1960s:

Consolidation of public schools in Esquesing Township
Central school (Year when opened)	Former school sections
Glen Williams (1950)	Clay Hill; Glen Williams
Limehouse (1962)	Bannockburn; Blue Mountain; Gibraltar; Mount Pleasant
Milton Heights (1955)	Milton Heights
Norval	Norval
Pineview (1963)	Hornby; Ligny; Pinegrove; Quatre Bras
Speyside (1960)	Dublin; Dufferin; Lorne; Waterloo
Stewarttown (1958)	Ashgrove; Stewarttown

In 1967, Stewarttown School became a middle school, providing Grades 7-8 for the Township. Younger children were bused to Speyside.

The single board for the Township only lasted until an Act of the Legislative Assembly of Ontario in 1968 constituted the Halton County Board of Education, which came into being on January 1, 1969. (Note: When the County was replaced by the Regional Municipality of Halton, the Board became the Halton Board of Education.)
