= John Roaf Barber =

Canadian politician

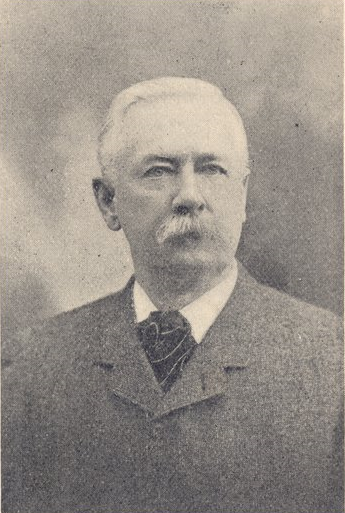

Ontario MPP
- In office 1902–1904
- Preceded by: John Barr
- Succeeded by: Frederick William Lewis
- Constituency: Halton
- In office 1898–1902
- Preceded by: William Kerns
- Succeeded by: Riding abolished
- Constituency: Halton

Personal details
- Born: July 5, 1841 Georgetown, Canada West
- Died: March 3, 1917 (aged 75) Georgetown, Ontario
- Party: Liberal
- Spouses: Mary Barclay (m. 1868–1899) Agnes Alberta Bessey (m. 1900)
- Children: 7
- Occupation: Businessman

John Roaf Barber (July 5, 1841 – March 3, 1917) was a Canadian businessman and politician, who represented Halton in the Legislative Assembly of Ontario from 1898 to 1904.

== Early life and business career ==
He was born in Georgetown, Ontario in 1841. His father came to Canada from County Antrim in Northern Ireland in 1822. His father and uncles had established a paper mill on the Credit River in 1854, after having been involved in woollen milling since 1837. Barber became the manager in 1861, and would become sole owner of the Barber Paper Mills in 1880. (Note: After Barber's retirement, one of the mills would eventually form part of Abitibi, while the other specializing in coated paper would eventually form part of Domtar.) The only other paper product supplier in Canada in the 1870s was owned by Alexander Buntin in Valleyfield, Quebec, from which Barber saw an opportunity to expand.

In 1876, his brother James, along with John Fitzallen Ellis, established Barber and Ellis, which became one of the largest stationery manufacturers and Wholesalers in Canada. Upon its incorporation in 1883, J.R. Barber purchasing a controlling interest and became its president.

In 1881, he helped establish Toronto Paper Manufacturing Company Limited and set up a mill at Cornwall, Ontario. By 1883 this mill was producing newsprint and high quality paper. He visited Europe in 1886 to find alternatives to wood pulp from Quebec, In 1887, together with Charles Riordon, he set up a pulp mill in Cornwall to supply newsprint and high-quality paper to his plant and others.

By 1888, he saw the need to upgrade the Georgetown mills to use hydroelectric power, and contracted Brush Electric (Note: a predecessor of General Electric) of Cincinnati, Ohio 4o manufacture and install a 100 horsepower (75 kW) electric generator and a 60 horsepower (45 kW) direct current motor, which operated together with a 75 horsepower (56 kW) water turbine already in place. This was believed to be the first industrial application of this technology in Canada. When Ontario Hydro's public network came to Georgetown in 1910, the Barber mills would connect to it three years later.

Besides his paper mills, he held high ranking positions in a number of other companies. He was president of many small companies such as Leadville Mining Company in Leadville, Colorado, Canadian Brass and Tube works in Toronto, and the Inter-Ocean Mining and Prospecting Company, also in Toronto.

== Public life ==
He also served in the Halton Rifles during 1863–1905, and saw active duty in 1866 during the Fenian raids. He was Reeve of Georgetown from 1867 to 1876 and was Warden of Halton County in 1882. He was elected to the Legislative Assembly of Ontario as a Liberal in 1898, but was unseated in November 1898 because of charges of vote buying by his agents. He was elected again, by a larger margin, in the subsequent byelection on December 8, 1898, and was reelected with a smaller majority in 1902. He chose not to stand for reelection in 1905 because of ill health.

== Later years ==
He lived in a grand mansion, Berwick Hall, which was designed by the architect E. J. Lennox

He retired from business in 1912 following a heart attack the year before. He died in Georgetown in 1917.
