= James J. Morrison =

James J. (J.J.) Morrison (1861–1936) was a Canadian farm leader in Ontario, Canada, a founder of the United Farmers of Ontario (UFO) in 1914, and a leader of the co-operative movement. He was the UFO's sometimes controversial general secretary, who was given to making bizarre pronouncements, during the period in which it became a political party and took power in the province following the 1919 provincial election.

== Early career ==
Morrison was born on his family's homestead in Peel Township, Wellington County.

He worked in manufacturing in Toronto for twelve years but returned to his family's farm in 1900. Morrison became active in the agrarian movement.

== United Farmers' leadership and infighting ==
Morrison helped found the UFO in 1914 as a farm advocacy organization of which he remained its secretary until 1933, and over which he exercised a sometimes somewhat eccentric leadership style. Among Morrison's early colleagues in the UFO were future Ontario Premiers Mitchell Hepburn and Harry Nixon.

Morrison also served as secretary of the United Farmers Co-operative Company Ltd. (UFCC) from 1914 to 1935. The UFCC was the purchasing co-operative that the UFO operated on behalf of its members.

=== Uniquely erratic political — or apolitical — style ===
The UFO entered party politics in the 1919 provincial election, although it was far from clear whether Morrison regarded himself as exercising a rôle according to conventional notions of party politics. To everyone's surprise, the UFO won enough seats to form a government in coalition with Labour MLAs.

Morrison had hoped the UFO would be able to hold the balance of power and thus win legislation favourable to farmers but there began a whole series of sometimes erratic actions and position taking on the part of Morrison which are difficult to describe adequately according to conventional notions of success or failure.

=== Unwillingness to serve as Premier ===
Despite his party's winning of enough seats in the Ontario Legislature, Morrison retained reservations about the UFO even forming a government.

The party ran without a leader and had no designated individual to serve as Premier of Ontario.

Morrison himself was offered the position of Premier, but he declined; in the light of Morrison's later behavior with regard to the Premier who did take office instead, this apparent unwillingness to lead in government office was ironic. Instead of Morrison, E.C. Drury was appointed Premier.

=== Unsupportive of Drury's Premiership ===
Morrison continued as UFO general secretary, yet, having declined to be Premier himself, steadfastly proved through a series of actions and stances to be unwilling to exercise a supportive role during Drury's Premiership.

Morrison became a thorn in the side of the Drury government on various levels. He held no formal government responsibility, but he had much power.

=== Opposition to alliance with urban workers ===
Morrison opposed the UFO's alliance with urban workers and the labour movement. Instead, Morrison was an advocate of what was known as a non-partisan "group government", as advocated by Henry Wise Wood, of the United Farmers of Alberta.

However, Premier Drury was not in agreement with this position. As head of the Provincial government, Drury rejected Morrison's position as impractical.

=== Objection to i) pension and ii) marketing initiatives ===
Morrison objected to initiatives by the Drury government such as a superannuation scheme for civil servants which was denounced by farmers.

He also opposed attempts by the government to establish a marketing system.

=== Opposition of Morrison's United Farmers to road improvement ===
The United Farmers of Ontario, as led by Morrison, could sometimes take stances widely regarded as bizarre and irrational. For example, even when the grouping was the leading element in Ontario's government, Morrison's UFO articulated hostility to the idea of good roads.

Such an arguably unpalatable stance only served to discredit Morrison's UFO further in the eyes of the electorate.

=== Collapse of Drury government ===
The lack of support by Morrison and his faction of the UFO was a contributing factor to the Drury government's electoral defeat in the 1923 election after one term; it could be fairly stated that, at least partly because of Morrison's series of stances, the UFO-led government spearheaded its own defeat.

==== Drury's long, enforced retirement ====
Subsequently, Morrison's UFO was not to lead an Ontario government again. After 1923, former Premier Drury, for his part, was left with the legacy of the memory of what may be widely regarded as many, highly unusual happenings during his Premiership. (Drury's period of retirement was long — he lived until 1968.)

== Later career ==
Premier Drury was replaced by Howard Ferguson in 1923, a circumstance which led Morrison into further controversy. While undoubtedly in some form of Opposition, he continued to exercise his unconventional style seen in the time when he was active in some form of Government-linked rôle.

=== Hostility to a personal, Official Opposition role ===
Morrison was personally unwilling to lead the United Farmers as the Official Opposition in the Ontario Legislature.

However, this did not indicate that Morrison acquiesced at others in his own organization taking a more prominent role in the organization. This led to further difficulties.

=== Hostility to a UFO, Official Opposition role ===
Against Morrison's own colleagues' views — he was also unwilling for the United Farmers to be designated the Official Opposition.

Instead, the designation of Official Opposition went to the Ontario Liberal Party. This bizarre situation arose, despite Morrison's own United Farmers having more seats than the Liberals.

== Personal legacy ==
=== Family background ===
Morrison's daughter, Rae Luckock, became a politician and served as an Ontario Co-operative Commonwealth Federation Member of Provincial Parliament in the 1940s.

=== Political repercussions ===
Morrison was a mentor to Agnes Macphail who served as an MP in the House of Commons of Canada in the 1920s and 1930s. Macphail and Luckock were the first two women elected to the Ontario legislature in 1943.

When his UFO was in office, Morrison undoubtedly spent many of his energies in conflict with UFO Premier Drury. Morrison's fraught relations with Premier Drury in the crucial period 1919-1923 may be summed up as follows: It was difficult for Drury to countenance successful governance in collaboration with his nominal ally, Morrison, because the latter was more interested in farming — and his personal relations with fellow farmers — than in matters of governance. It was equally difficult for Drury to try to govern without Morrison, since the latter as UFO leader had the power to bring him down (which, in substance, did indeed happen).

The career of J J Morisson arguably exemplifies the results of a single issue cause mindset being thrust upon the political scene, while remaining disturbingly immune to perceptions of political feasibility.

Morrison died in 1936.

== See also ==
- Ernest Charles Drury#Opposition of J.J.Morrison and other controversies
- Henry Wise Wood#Class conflict ideology
