= Canadian Parliamentary Guide =

The Canadian Parliamentary Guide, formerly known as the Canadian Parliamentary Companion and the Canadian Parliamentary Companion and Annual Register, is a reference publication which lists the members of the House of Commons of Canada and the Senate of Canada as well as of the provincial and territorial legislatures.

It also includes short biographies of each member and results from the most recent election and by-elections. It was first published in 1862 and was published annually (occasionally biennially) since 1867. It is currently published by Grey House Publishing Canada.

Editors included:

- Henry James Morgan
- Charles Herbert Mackintosh
- John Alexander Gemmill
- Arnott James Magurn
- P.G. Normandin
- A.L. Normandin
