= Farm Radio International =

Food security organization

Farm Radio International / Radios Rurales Internationales
- Farm Radio International logo

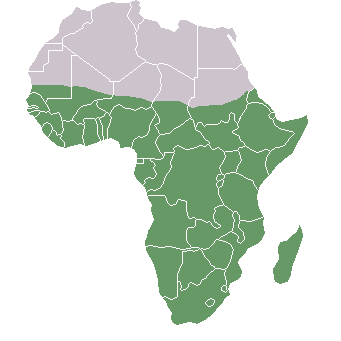
- Geographical target area
- Abbreviation: FRI
- Formation: May 1, 1979 by George Atkins
- Type: NGO
- Purpose: Rural development
- Headquarters: Ottawa, Ontario, Canada
- Region served: Sub-Saharan Africa
- Official language: English & French
- President: Doug Ward
- Staff: 17 (according to annual report 2007/2008)
- Website: http://www.farmradio.org/

Farm Radio International, or Radios Rurales Internationales (official French name), is a Canadian non-profit organization that was founded in 1979 by CBC Radio broadcaster George Atkins. The organization is headquartered in Ottawa, Ontario and works with radio broadcasters to improve food security and agricultural methods for small-scale farmers and rural communities in African countries.

Farm Radio International use radio, a tool that is easily accessed in sub-Saharan Africa, to communicate information on low-cost and sustainable farming practices. These farmers are often among the most vulnerable to hunger, malnutrition, and poverty, but also produce and provide the majority of food on the continent. This radio allows farmers to gain valuable information through radio programs, which can improve their knowledge and help grow and improve their farming practices. Farm Radio International states that across Africa, 2% of farmers have landline access, 3% have internet access, and 18% have mobile phones. In contrast, 76% of farmers have radio set access, making radio an effective way to share farming practices. However, access to mobile phones has been increasing quite rapidly, making mobile phones another effective way to share farming practices.

== History ==
The organization was founded in 1979 by George Atkins, a journalist at CBC Radio, under the name Developing Countries Farm Radio Network (DCFRN). During a trip to Zambia in 1975, Mr. Atkins found that there was a lack of information about simple farming techniques for African smallholder farmers. Four years later the first script package was sent out to broadcasters and DCFRN was created.

Following the start-up in 1979, the organization was sending scripts and other useful materials to broadcasters in 100 developing countries, reaching an estimated 100 million people.

In 2000, communication specialists, as well as the organization's principal donor, began to question its approach and a four-year revamp restructuring its mission, programs, and funding took place. After these changes, the organization focused more on communications for development, management, and how people learn.

In 2008 the organization changed its name to Farm Radio International.

== Scale of operations ==
Farm Radio International has numerous offices, the Canadian headquarters based in Ottawa, and several other offices throughout Africa. Those locations include Burkina Faso, Ethiopia, Ghana, Kenya, Malawi, Mali, Mozambique, Nigeria, Senegal, Tanzania, and Uganda.

Farm Radio International has reached 700 radio partners in 40 sub-Saharan African countries, some including Ethiopia, Sudan, Somalia, Kenya, and Nigeria. Through these partnerships, Farm Radio International has been able to reach a potential audience of 100 million.

== Work ==
Farm Radio International relies on a 3-pillar approach, which includes…

1. Radio Resources: Farm Radio International provides four different resources for radio broadcasters in Africa to improve their radio programs.
  - Resource Packs: information packages that include scripts and other useful resources for broadcasters, including interviews, backgrounders, and more.
  - Barza Wire: a weekly news service, which shares relevant stories to small-scale farmers and rural communities in Africa.
  - eDiscussions: online discussions that bring together broadcasters and subject matter experts.
  - Training: a range of online and in-person learning opportunities for African radio broadcasters that help them improve the quality of their programs for farmers.
2. Radio Projects: development projects delivered over the radio, which allow farmers to listen in and receive important and helpful information for their farming practices.
3. Radio Innovations: develop new program formats by combining radio with interactive ICTs like mobile phones, which make radio more effective, dynamic and interactive.

Farm Radio International has received donations from the likes of the United States Agency for International Development, the Bill & Melinda Gates Foundation, Grand Challenges Canada, International Fund for Agricultural Development (IFAD), Global Affairs Canada, the World Food Programme (WFP), the International Development Research Centre (IDRC), and the Rockefeller Foundation.

=== Impact ===
Farm Radio International has had an enormous impact on small-scale farmers in sub-Saharan Africa. They have used evaluations to determine that their radio programs are listened to regularly by 40-60 percent of potential listeners, which leads to 20 percent of listeners applying new and more productive practices on their farms.

Farm Radio International has released research publications on strategies that can benefit the effectiveness of radio. For example, adding in an interactive factor into radio through the use of ICTs and digital technologies. The research stated that participatory strategies including the use of interactive ICTs can help to engage audiences, increase knowledge of agricultural improvements and innovations, and contribute to higher levels of adoption than result from listening alone. The focus on interactivity also has the potential to contribute to women's empowerment by giving them a voice, facilitating their involvement in decision-making, and strengthening their social capital (Farnworth & Colverson, 2015).

Farm Radio International also launched the African Farm Radio Research Initiative (AFRRI), which was used to assess the effectiveness of farm radio on meeting the food security objectives of rural farming households in Africa. This initiative was important due to the fact that there are not many studies which look at the effectiveness of radio in improving food security. The initiative allowed Farm Radio International to gain insight into what types of projects and work would be beneficial.

== Projects ==
Farm Radio International has implemented numerous radio projects, which have not only reached farmers, but also non-farmers in sub-Saharan Africa.

The projects are delivered weekly for a certain number of weeks.

One project, known as “Innovation for Food Security”, which was based in Mali, had a goal to improve the household consumption of nutritious food by vulnerable communities. The project was funded by Save the Children US, USAID, and was designed to be gender inclusive and accessible to women. This allowed women to participate in food-related discussions and decisions on air. The project produced 12 episodes with roughly 108,000 listeners, which was 77% of the small target area. Through the project, listeners' knowledge on nutrition more than tripled, and amongst women, it increased more than ninefold.

Another project, known as “My Children II”, which was based in Uganda, had a goal to combat vitamin A deficiency by promoting the production and consumption of orange-fleshed sweet potato (OFSP). The project was funded by HarvestPlus, and was designed as a radio drama, which used storytelling to explain the benefits of OFSP. This project was broadcast in 7 different languages by 13 stations, this resulting in a potential audience of 16 million people, which is considered to be 39% of the entire country.

== Fundraising and effectiveness ==
Farm Radio International benefits from the donations of individuals, groups, corporations and foundations. The donations allow Farm Radio International to create a variety of opportunities, such as producing radio scripts for broadcasters, providing training programs for broadcasters, and improving food security and helping reduce poverty in developing countries. According to Charity Intelligence Canada, "The charity received $2.2m in government funding in 2022, representing 21% of total revenue. The charity’s administrative costs are 8% of total revenue (excluding investment income) and its fundraising costs are 25% of donations. This results in total overhead spending of 33%. For every dollar donated to the charity, 67 cents are available to go to the cause, which is within Ci’s reasonable range." Farm Radio International has also consistently received a four-star rating from the organization.
