= Canadian Federation of Agriculture =

Canadian farm organization

- Abbreviation: CFA
- Formation: 1935
- Type: Non-Profit
- Headquarters: Ottawa, Ontario
- Official language: English, French
- President: Mary Robinson
- Main organ: Assembly
- Website: www.cfa-fca.ca

The Canadian Federation of Agriculture (CFA) is Canada's largest general farm organization, representing 200,000 farmers and farm families. The organization is headquartered in Ottawa, Ontario, with the mandate to provide a unified industry voice at the national level. The CFA was formed in 1935, and continues today as a farmer-funded, national umbrella organization representing provincial general farm organizations and national commodity groups.

== Activities ==
- To coordinate the efforts of agricultural producer organizations throughout Canada for the purpose of promoting their common interest through collective action.
- To assist members and where necessary government, in forming and promoting national agricultural policies to meet changing domestic and international economic conditions; and to collaborate and cooperate with organized groups of producers outside Canada to further this objective.
- To promote and advance acceptance of positive social, economic and environmental conditions of those engaged in agricultural pursuits.

To promote awareness of agricultural producer organizations, the CFA sponsors a "Food Freedom Day", the date when an average Canadian family has earned enough income to pay the grocery bill for the entire year. In 2008, the Ontario Federation of Agriculture calculated that it took 34 days (Feb. 3, 2008) for the average Ontario family to make enough to cover their food expenses for the year. The 2017 date for Food Freedom Day is February 8. February 9 is the day for 2023.

== Elected executives ==
The current President of the Canadian Federation of Agriculture is Mary Robinson. She is the first female to hold this position. Robinson had previously been the chairperson of the Canadian Ag HR Council and, before that, President of the PEI Federation of Agriculture. The current First Vice President is Keith Currie, past president of the Ontario Federation of Agriculture, and the acting Second Vice President is Todd Lewis, current President of APAS (Agricultural Producers Association of Saskatchewan).

== Membership and policy development ==
Being a federation of organizations, the deliberative body is composed of provincial farm organizations and commodity groups. Policy is generally developed in the form of grassroots resolutions, passed through member organizations and finally brought before the general assembly for a vote at the Annual General Meeting. Additional policy development decisions are deliberated by the 24 board members. Organizational decision-making is decided through a subset of the board of directors, called the National Council.

Members of the Canadian Federation of Agriculture currently include:

Provincial Farm Organizations:

Organization	Acronym	Province
Newfoundland and Labrador Federation of Agriculture	NLFA	Newfoundland and Labrador
Nova Scotia Federation of Agriculture	NSFA	Nova Scotia
Prince Edward Island Federation of Agriculture	PEIFA	Prince Edward Island
Agricultural Alliance of New Brunswick	AANB	New Brunswick
Union des producteurs agricoles	UPA	Quebec
Ontario Federation of Agriculture	OFA	Ontario
Keystone Agricultural Producers	KAP	Manitoba
Agricultural Producers Association of Saskatchewan	APAS	Saskatchewan
Alberta Federation of Agriculture	AFA	Alberta
British Columbia Agriculture Council	BCAC	British Columbia

Commodity Groups and Other Organizations:

Organization	Acronym	Area of Focus
Dairy Farmers of Canada	DFC	Dairy Marketing
Chicken Farmers of Canada	CFC	Chicken meat Marketing
Egg Farmers of Canada	EFC	Chicken egg Marketing
Turkey Farmers of Canada	CTMA	Turkey Meat
Canadian Hatching Egg Producers	CHEP	Broiler Eggs
Canadian Seed Growers Association	CPC	Seed Marketing
Canadian Sugar Beet Producers' Association	CSBPA	Sugar Beet Production and Marketing
Canadian Ornamental Horticultural Alliance	CHC	Greenhouse and Flowers
National Sheep Network	CFQ	Sheep Marketing
Canadian Young Farmers Forum	CYFF	Agricultural youth organization
Mushrooms Canada	MC	Mushroom Marketing
Foreign Agricultural Resource Management Services	FARMS	Resource management
Equestrian Canada	EC	Horses
Standardbred Canada	SC	Horses
