= Bronte Creek =

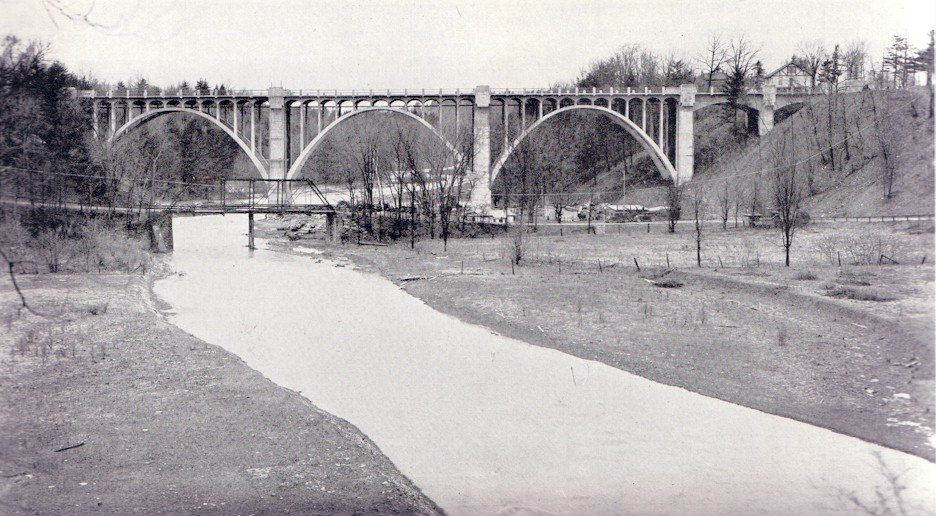
- The Bronte Creek bridge in 1936, built as part of The Middle Road, now known as the Queen Elizabeth Way. The original iron truss bridge from the country lane is in the foreground.

- Location of the mouth of Bronte Creek in southern Ontario
- Native name: Eshkwesing-ziibi (Eastern Ojibwa)

Location
- Country: Canada
- Province: Ontario
- Region: Greater Toronto and Hamilton Area
- County, City, Regional Municipality: Wellington, Hamilton, Halton
- Municipalities: Puslinch, Hamilton, Burlington, Oakville

Physical characteristics
- Source: wetland
  - location: Puslinch
  - coordinates: 43°26′29″N 80°07′36″W
  - elevation: 330 m (1,080 ft)
- Mouth: Lake Ontario
  - location: Oakville
  - coordinates: 43°23′34″N 79°42′23″W
  - elevation: 74 m (243 ft)
- Basin size: 315 km^{2} (122 sq mi)

Basin features
- River system: Great Lakes Basin
- Tributaries
  - left: Mountsberg Creek, Flamboro Creek, Kilbride Creek, Limestone Creek, Indian Creek
  - right: Strabane Creek, Willoughby Creek, Lowville Creek, Mount Nemo Creek

Bronte Creek is a waterway in the Lake Ontario watershed of Ontario Canada. It runs through Hamilton and Halton Region, with its source near Morriston (south of the intersection of Highway 6 and Highway 401), passing Bronte Creek Provincial Park, on its way to Lake Ontario at Bronte Harbour in Oakville, where the creek is also known as Twelve Mile Creek. Bronte takes its name from the title of the Duke of Bronté held by Horatio Nelson.

Bronte Creek in Ojibwe is "Eshkwesing-ziibi", "Esqui-sink", "Eshkwessing", "ishkwessin", and "Asquasing" ("that which lies at the end").

== History ==
A village site associated with the Neutral people and located on the east bank of the creek, the Hood site, was excavated in 1977.

== Geology ==
Just south of the Queen Elizabeth Way at the Bronte Road exit, the creek has exposed an outcrop of Queenston Formation red shale with narrow, greenish layers of calcareous sandstone and silty bioclastic carbonate.

== See also ==
- List of rivers of Ontario
