= Halton County =

Former county in Ontario, Canada

Coordinates: 43°35′N 79°55′W

Halton County is a former county in the Canadian province of Ontario, with an area of 92,342 hectares (228,181 acres). It is also one of the oldest counties in Canada.

== History ==
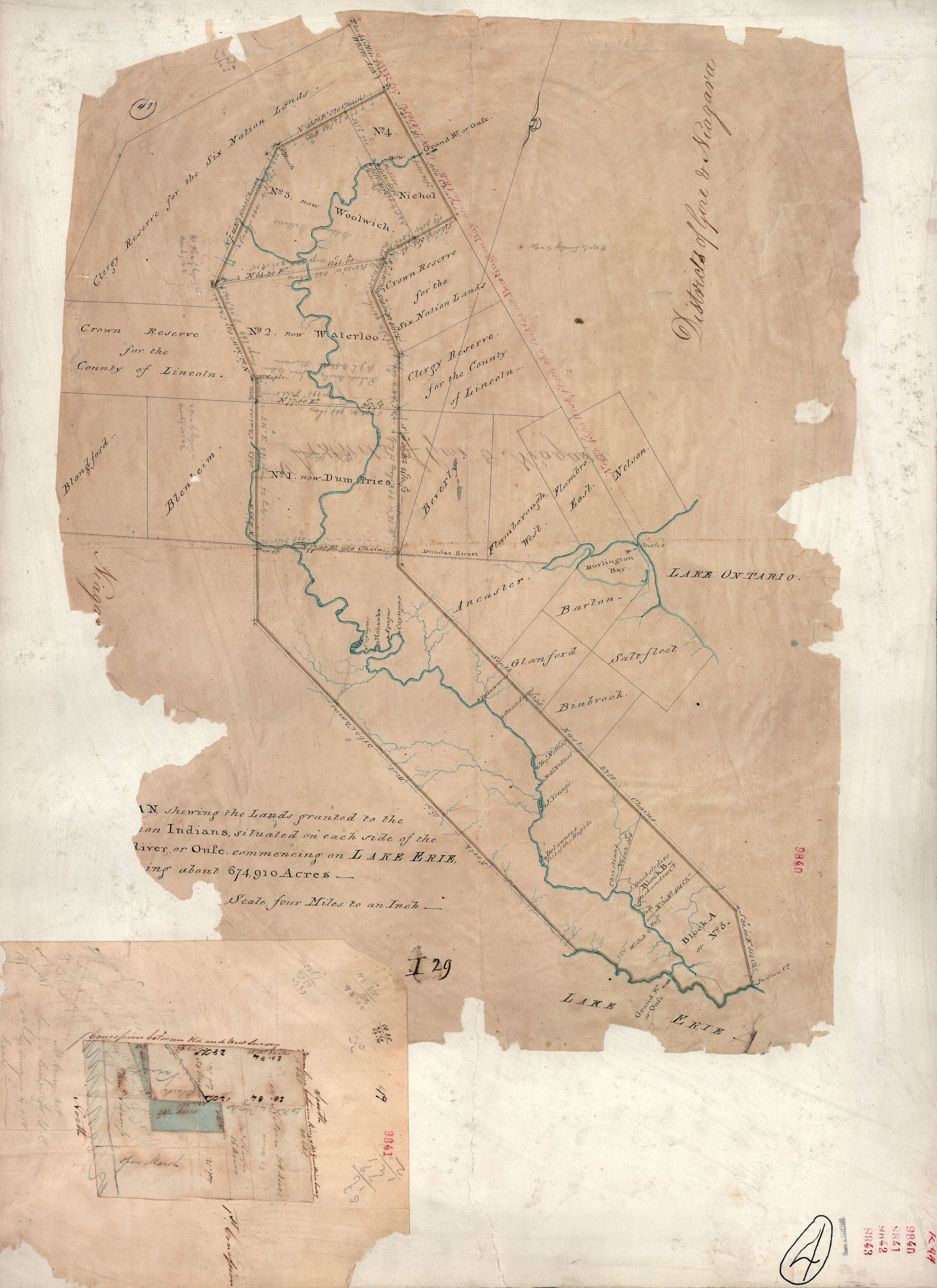
Thomas Ridout survey of 1821. The northern section shows Blocks 1–4, together with Crown reserves and clergy reserves, and certain townships to the east, all being north of Dundas Street, that became part of Halton.

Halton County is named after Major William Mathew Halton (1746–1823), a British Army officer, who was appointed in England in 1805 as Secretary to Upper Canada Lieutenant-Governor Sir Francis Gore and spent little time in Canada during his posting (served two terms, 1806–1811 and 1815–1816).

Settlers started to arrive in the area in the early 1780s. The south was first settled by United Empire Loyalists, and the north was settled mainly by immigrants from the British Isles. In 1788, the area became part of the Nassau District, which was renamed the Home District in 1792.

=== Historic townships ===
- Esquesing Township (area 66,700 acres (104 sq mi; 270 km^{2})). Opened in 1819, the first town meeting was held in 1821 when the population was 424. The name Esquesing was said to come from an Indigenous word meaning "the land of the tall pine(s)", but is more likely to come from the Mississauga word ishkwessin, meaning "that which lies at the end", which was the original name for Bronte Creek. Community centres were Georgetown, Acton, Glen Williams, Stewarttown, Norval, Limehouse.
- Nassagaweya Township (area 44,797 acres (70 sq mi; 181 km^{2})). Opened in 1819, its name was derived from the Mississauga word niizhozaagiwan, meaning "having two outlets", which was the original name of the Sixteen Mile Creek. Community centres were Campbellville, Darbyville and Eden Mills.
- Nelson Township (area 46,236 acres (72 sq mi; 187 km^{2})) Opened in 1806 and named in honour of Horatio Nelson, 1st Viscount Nelson. Community centre: Burlington.
- Trafalgar Township (area 67,055 acres (105 sq mi; 271 km^{2})), opened in 1806, the year after the Battle of Trafalgar. The township was settled in 1807. Community centres were Milton, Oakville, Bronte.

=== First Nations land surrenders ===
The lands that eventually formed part of Halton were acquired from the Mississauga Indians as follows:

Land surrenders leading to formation of Halton County
Treaty	Date	Area	Nelson	Trafalgar	Nassagaweya	Esquesing
3¾	24 October 1795	3,450 acres (14.0 km^{2})	✓			
8	21 August 1797	3,450 acres (14.0 km^{2})	✓			
13a	2 August 1805	Part of township	✓	✓		
14	6 September 1806	Part of township	✓	✓		
19	21 October 1818	Part of township	✓	✓		
19	28 October 1818	Part of Trafalgar; All of Nassagaweya and Esquesing		✓	✓	✓

=== Municipal organization and evolution ===
Along with Wentworth County, Halton County was created in 1816 as part of the Gore District, consisting of the townships of Trafalgar, Nelson, Flamborough, and Beverley, together with certain blocks of land on the Grand River and reserved lands to the rear of the townships of Blenheim and Blandford. In 1821, the county was expanded through the addition of the townships of Esquesing, Erin, Nassagaweya, Eramosa, and Garafraxa, together with certain church land.

In 1838, on the creation of Wellington District, the townships of Garafraxa, Nichol, Woolwich, Guelph, Waterloo, Wilmot, Dumfries, Puslinch, Erin and Eramosa were withdrawn from Halton and transferred to it, to be known as Waterloo County.

Upon the passage of the Act of Union 1840, for electoral purposes Halton became two ridings for electing members to the Legislative Assembly of the Province of Canada:

- East Riding: the townships of Trafalgar, Nelson, Esquesing, Nassagaweya, East Flamborough, West Flamborough, Erin and Beverley.
- West Riding: the townships of Garafraxa, Nichol, Woolwich, Guelph, Waterloo, Wilmot, Dumfries, Puslinch and Eramosa.

When the East and West Ridings were renamed for their respective counties in 1845, the township of Erin continued to be part of Halton for electoral purposes.

When the Gore District was abolished in 1850, the township of Erin was fully withdrawn and Halton County was united with Wentworth County to form the United Counties of Wentworth and Halton. As a result of a territorial reorganization in 1851, Halton County was reduced in size, with only the townships of Esquesing, Trafalgar, Nassageweya and Nelson remaining, and the union of counties was abolished in 1854.

As settlement progressed, several urban areas developed and were organized into separate villages and towns:

- Acton: incorporated as a village in 1874, and erected into a town in 1950.
- Bronte: incorporated as a village in 1952.
- Burlington: incorporated as a village in 1872, and erected into a town in 1915.
- Georgetown: incorporated as a village in 1864, and erected into a town in 1921.
- Milton: incorporated as a town in 1857.
- Oakville: incorporated as a town in 1857.

In 1861, the County population was about 22,794.

In 1958, Burlington amalgamated with the township of Nelson and annexed part of the township of East Flamborough. Oakville did the same in 1962, through amalgamation with Bronte and the township of Trafalgar. As a consequence, special legislation was passed to provide that votes of members of the county council were to be allocated according to the populations of the respective municipalities, provided that the combined number of votes for Burlington and Oakville would not be greater than the total votes allocated to the remaining municipalities.

In 1974, Halton County was replaced by the Regional Municipality of Halton.

== See also ==
- List of Ontario census divisions
- List of townships in Ontario
