= James Rayside =

Canadian politician

Ontario MPP
- In office 1882–1894
- Preceded by: Donald Macmaster
- Succeeded by: David Murdoch MacPherson
- Constituency: Glengarry

Personal details
- Born: April 1836 Montreal, Lower Canada
- Died: November 1, 1895 (aged 59) Martintown, Ontario
- Party: Liberal
- Spouse: Margaret McDougall (m. 1864)
- Occupation: Businessman

James Rayside (April 1836 – November 1, 1895) was an Ontario, Canada, businessman and political figure. He represented Glengarry in the Legislative Assembly of Ontario from 1882 to 1894 as a Liberal member.

== Biography ==
Rayside was born in Montreal in 1836, the son of Scottish immigrants, and was raised by his grandparents in Martintown, Upper Canada. He learned the trade of carpentry and became a millwright. He travelled to British Columbia in 1862 during the gold rush there. In 1864, he returned to Martintown, where he married Margaret McDougall. Rayside became involved in the lumber trade and owned a number of sawmills. He served as reeve of Charlottenburg Township. He was defeated by Donald Macmaster for a seat in the provincial assembly in 1878 but was elected in an 1882 by-election held after Macmaster ran for seat in the federal parliament. In 1880, he moved to Lancaster.

== Electoral history ==
1879 Ontario general election: Glengarry
Party	Candidate	Votes	%	±%
Conservative	Donald Macmaster	1,331	50.78	
Liberal	James Rayside	1,290	49.22	+0.28
Total valid votes		2,621	74.31	+0.24
Eligible voters		3,527		
Conservative gain from Independent Liberal		Swing		−0.14
Source: Elections Ontario
