= James J. Craig =

Canadian politician

Ontario MPP
- In office 1905–1911
- Preceded by: John Morison Gibson
- Succeeded by: Udney Richardson
- Constituency: Wellington East

Personal details
- Born: February 21, 1855 Glengarry County, Canada West
- Died: May 27, 1929 (aged 74) Fergus, Ontario, Canada
- Party: Conservative
- Spouse: Margaret Argo (m. 1891)
- Children: 3
- Occupation: Educator

James J. Craig (February 21, 1855 – May 27, 1929) was an educator and politician in Ontario, Canada. He represented Wellington East in the Legislative Assembly of Ontario from 1905 to 1911 as a Conservative member.

The son of James Craig and Flora McLeod, he was born in Glengarry County and was educated in Williamstown, at Upper Canada College and at Queen's University. Craig taught school in Arnprior and Orangeville. At this point, he took up the study of law for two years but then decided to return to teaching, going on to teach in Arthur, Goderich and Mount Forest. In 1881, he was named public school inspector for Wellington County.

He moved to Fergus in 1882. Craig served on the village council, also serving four years as reeve. He served as chair of the Fergus Public Utilities Commission from 1913 to 1929.

In 1891, he married Margaret Argo. The couple had three children.

Craig also served in the county militia, reaching the rank of lieutenant-colonel. In 1916, he was given command of a battalion and tasked with preparing them for combat in World War I. This appears to have brought him into conflict with his superiors and resulted in the end of his militia career.

While teaching school, Craig encouraged his students to play lacrosse and organized local lacrosse teams. When he moved to Fergus, he helped revitalize the local team. In 1898, he was named president of the Canadian Lacrosse Association.

He was a member of the local Masonic lodge, reaching the rank of District Deputy Grand Master, and of the Orange Order. He also served as secretary-treasurer of the Centre Wellington Agricultural Society.

Craig was first elected to the Ontario assembly in 1905 and was reelected in 1908. He was defeated by Udney Richardson when he ran for reelection in 1911. He ran again in 1923 but lost to William Raney.

Following his defeat in 1923, his health began to deteriorate and Craig underwent a number of operations. He died at home in Fergus. His funeral was the largest in the history of the town.
