= Alexander McMartin =

Canadian politician (1788–1853)

Alexander McMartin (1788–July 12, 1853) was a businessman and political figure in Upper Canada. He was the first person born in Upper Canada to serve in its Legislative Assembly.

== Early life and career ==
He was born in Charlottenburgh Township in 1788, the son of a United Empire Loyalist who settled on the Raisin River. The settlement that formed around his father's mills was first known as MacMartin's Mills and later Martintown.

McMartin served with the Glengarry militia during the War of 1812 and the Lower Canada Rebellion in 1838. He was elected to the 6th Parliament of Upper Canada in 1812 representing Glengarry and represented the county until 1824. During the 1820s, McMartin took over the mill operations. In 1827, with a partner, he took on a contract to clear land for a section of the Rideau Canal. As the project proceeded, he found that their costs were going to be much greater than the value of the bid. Despite verbal assurances from Colonel John By, he was not compensated for his losses on the project. In 1828, he was elected again as Glengarry's representative and served until 1834.

He also served as justice of the peace, postmaster for Martintown and sheriff for the Eastern District.

== Death ==
He died at Martintown in 1853.
