= Stormont-Dundas and Glengarry (provincial electoral district) =

Ontario electoral district

Defunct provincial electoral district
- Legislature: Legislative Assembly of Ontario
- District created: 1975
- District abolished: 1995
- First contested: 1975
- Last contested: 1995

Stormont-Dundas and Glengarry was an electoral riding in Ontario, Canada. It was created in 1975 by redistributing the riding of Glengarry and parts of the ridings of Stormont and Grenville-Dundas. In 1995, the riding was expanded to include part of Grenville, becoming the riding of Stormont-Dundas-Glengarry and East Grenville. In 1999, following a reduction in the number of provincial ridings from 130 to 103 by the Harris government, the riding was combined with Cornwall to create the riding of Stormont-Dundas-Charlottenburg.

== Members of Provincial Parliament ==
Stormont-Dundas and Glengarry
Assembly	Years	Member	Party
30th	1975–1977	Osie Villeneuve	Progressive Conservative
31st	1977–1981	Osie Villeneuve	Progressive Conservative
32nd	1981–1983	Osie Villeneuve	Progressive Conservative
32nd	1983–1985	Noble Villeneuve	Progressive Conservative
33rd	1985–1987	Noble Villeneuve	Progressive Conservative
34th	1987–1990	Noble Villeneuve	Progressive Conservative
35th	1990–1995	Noble Villeneuve	Progressive Conservative
Merged into the riding of Stormont-Dundas-Glengarry and East Grenville before the 1995 election
Stormont—Dundas—Glengarry and East Grenville
36th	1995–1999	Noble Villeneuve	Progressive Conservative
Sourced from the Ontario Legislative Assembly
Redistributed into the riding of Stormont-Dundas-Charlottenburg before the 1999 election
