= Donald Macmaster =

Canadian politician

Sir Donald Macmaster Bt KC MP
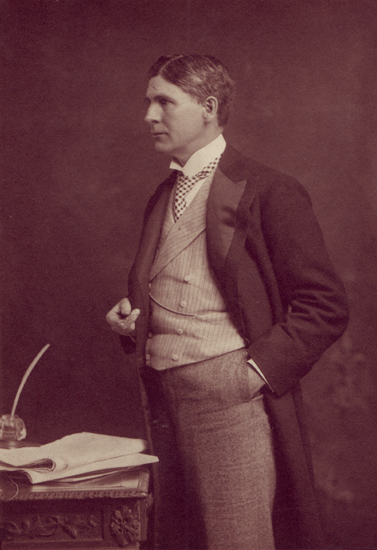
- Donald Macmaster, photographed by Elliott & Fry between 1895 and 1903

Member of the United Kingdom Parliament for Chertsey
- In office 1910–1922
- Preceded by: Francis Marnham
- Succeeded by: Philip Richardson

Member of Parliament for Glengarry
- In office 1883–1887
- Preceded by: John McLennan
- Succeeded by: Patrick Purcell

Ontario MPP
- In office 1879–1882
- Preceded by: Alexander James Grant
- Succeeded by: James Rayside
- Constituency: Glengarry

Personal details
- Born: 3 September 1846 Williamstown, Glengarry County, Canada West
- Died: 3 March 1922 (aged 75) London, England
- Party: Conservative
- Spouses: Janet Macdonald (m. 1880) Ella Virginia DeFord (m. 1890)
- Children: 1
- Occupation: Lawyer

Military service
- Allegiance: Canadian Militia
- Branch/service: Williamstown Volunteer Infantry
- Rank: Lieutenant
- Battles/wars: Fenian Raids (1866)

Sir Donald Macmaster, 1st Baronet, KC (3 September 1846 – 3 March 1922) was a Canadian lawyer and a politician in both Canada and the United Kingdom.

Macmaster was born into a family of Scottish descent in Williamstown, Glengarry County, Canada West (now in eastern Ontario). During the Fenian Raids in 1866 he served as a lieutenant in the Williamstown Volunteer Infantry. He studied law at McGill University, was called to the Quebec bar in 1871, and set up practice in Montreal. Macmaster served as Crown Prosecutor for many cases. He was called to the Ontario bar and appointed Queen's Counsel in 1882.

He represented Glengarry in the Legislative Assembly of Ontario from 1879 to 1882 and in the House of Commons of Canada as a Conservative member from 1883 to 1887, when he lost his seat.

In 1905, Macmaster emigrated to the United Kingdom and settled in London, intending to practise in Privy Council cases, in which he already had considerable experience. Having been defeated at Leigh in 1906, in 1910 he was elected to the House of Commons as Conservative member for the Chertsey division of Surrey, holding the seat until his death. He was created a baronet in the 1921 New Year Honours.

In 1880, he married Janet Macdonald, who died less than three years later. In 1890 he married the American Ella Virginia DeFord. Their only son, Donald, was killed in action at the Battle of Loos while commanding a company of the Cameron Highlanders on 25 September 1915.

== Electoral history ==
1879 Ontario general election: Glengarry
Party	Candidate	Votes	%	±%
Conservative	Donald Macmaster	1,331	50.78	
Liberal	James Rayside	1,290	49.22	+0.28
Total valid votes		2,621	74.31	+0.24
Eligible voters		3,527		
Conservative gain from Independent Liberal		Swing		−0.14
Source: Elections Ontario

== Footnotes ==
Parliament of the United Kingdom
Preceded by Francis Marnham	Member of Parliament for Chertsey; 1910–1922	Succeeded by Philip Richardson
Preceded by Matthew Vaughan-Davies	Oldest Member of Parliament (not Father of the House); January–June 1921	Succeeded by Henry Armstrong
Baronetage of the United Kingdom
New creation	Baronet (of Glengarry); 1921–1922	Extinct
