= James Alexander Sangster =

Canadian politician

Ontario MPP
- In office 1929–1937
- Preceded by: Angus McGillis
- Succeeded by: Edmund MacGillivray
- In office 1923–1926
- Preceded by: Duncan Alexander Ross
- Succeeded by: Angus McGillis
- Constituency: Glengarry

Personal details
- Born: November 19, 1861 Bainsville, Canada West
- Died: June 23, 1937 (aged 75) Toronto, Ontario
- Party: Liberal
- Spouse: Bertha H. Haines (m. 1891)
- Occupation: Merchant

James Alexander Sangster (November 19, 1861 – June 23, 1937) was an Ontario merchant and political figure. He represented Glengarry in the Legislative Assembly of Ontario from 1923 to 1926 and from 1929 to 1937 as a Liberal member.

He was born in Bainsville, Lancaster Township, Canada West, the son of George Sangster. In 1891, he married Bertha H. Haines. He served on the township council, serving ten years as reeve and warden for the United Counties of Stormont, Dundas and Glengarry in 1922. Sangster was a merchant in Bainsville in partnership with D. D. McCuaig. He died in office in 1937.

On April 26, 1918, Sangster won approval for his bill pertaining to driving on the right side of the road. From that day on, all vehicles, motorized or non-motorized, have had to comply with this new regulation all over Canada.
