= David Murdoch MacPherson =

Canadian politician

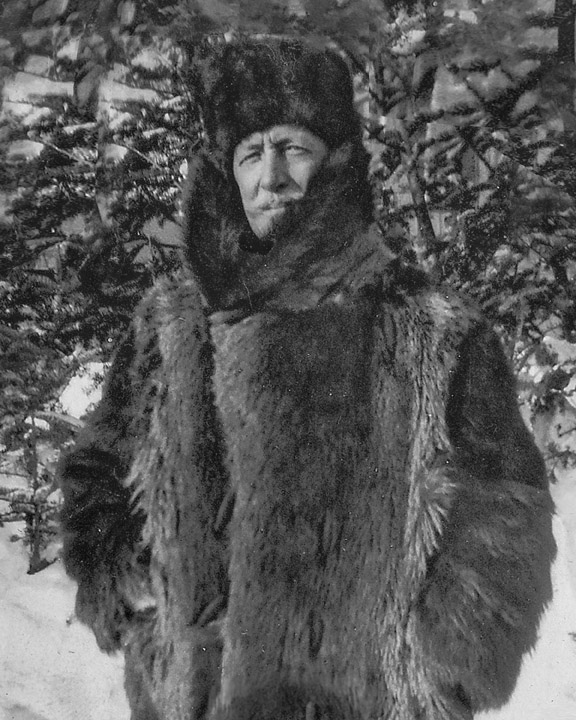
- "D.M." Macpherson, c.1900

Ontario MPP
- In office 1894–1898
- Preceded by: James Rayside
- Succeeded by: Donald Robert McDonald
- Constituency: Glengarry

Personal details
- Born: November 17, 1847 Lancaster Township, Canada West
- Died: February 15, 1915 (aged 67) Montreal, Quebec
- Party: Liberal-Patrons of Industry
- Spouse: Margaret McBean (m. 1871)
- Occupation: Dairy farmer

David Murdoch "D.M." Macpherson (November 17, 1847 – February 4, 1915) was a Canadian dairyman, inventor, manufacturer and political figure. He represented Glengarry in the Legislative Assembly of Ontario as a Liberal-Patrons of Industry member from 1894 to 1898. His surname also appears as McPherson in some sources.

He was born in Lancaster Township, Canada West, the son of John McPherson, a native of Kingussie, Scotland, and Catherine Cameron, daughter of John Cameron "the Rich". He inherited the family dairy farm and in 1871 married Margaret McBean, daughter of Duncan McBean of Montreal and Lancaster, Ontario. He became a major cheese producer, owning a large group of factories known as the Allan Grove Combination, with factories in Ontario, Quebec and upper New York state. He also manufactured cheese boxes at Lancaster and Alexandria, where he partnered with Jacob Thomas Schell, and had patented a steel cheese box hoop. Macpherson invented several mechanical devices for use in cheese making. In 1871, he married Margaret McBean. Macpherson was commonly known as the "Cheese King". He was a commissioner to the Indian and Colonial Exhibition of 1886 in London, England. Macpherson served as president of the Dairymen's Association of Eastern Ontario in 1887 and became the first president of the Dairymen's Association of the Dominion of Canada in 1890. He was also president of the Dominion Cold Storage Company. He was defeated for the provincial seat in 1898 by Donald Robert McDonald.

He died in Montreal in 1915 and is buried at the Presbyterian churchyard in South Lancaster, Ontario.
