= James Craig (Canadian politician) =

Canadian politician

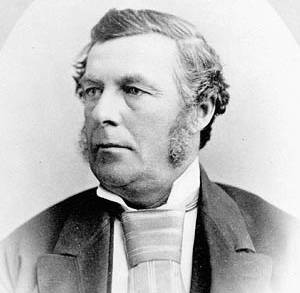

Ontario MPP
- In office 1867–1874
- Preceded by: Riding established
- Succeeded by: Alexander James Grant
- Constituency: Glengarry

Personal details
- Born: 1823 Charlottenburg Township, Upper Canada
- Died: 1874 (aged 50–51) Summerstown, Ontario
- Party: Conservative
- Spouse: Flora McLeod (m. 1851)
- Relations: James J. Craig, son
- Occupation: Farmer

James Craig (February 15, 1823 – November 10, 1874) was an Ontario farmer and political figure. He represented Glengarry in the Legislative Assembly of Ontario as a Conservative member from 1867 to 1874.

The son of James Craig and Helen Frue, he was born in Charlottenburg Township in Upper Canada in 1823. He was a farmer and was also involved in the timber trade. He served on the township council, becoming reeve, and was elected county warden in 1862. He died at Summerstown in 1874.

In 1851, he married Flora McLeod. His son James also served in the Ontario assembly.

== Electoral history ==
1867 Ontario general election: Glengarry
Party	Candidate	Votes	%
Conservative	James Craig	1,149	56.71
Liberal	A. McNab	877	43.29
Total valid votes		2,026	82.59
Eligible voters		2,453	
Conservative pickup new district.			
Source: Elections Ontario

1871 Ontario general election: Glengarry
Party	Candidate	Votes	%	±%
Conservative	James Craig	962	52.89	−3.83
Liberal	R.R. McLennan	857	47.11	+3.83
Turnout		1,819	72.30	−10.29
Eligible voters		2,516		
Conservative hold		Swing		−3.83
Source: Elections Ontario
