= Alexander James Grant =

Canadian politician

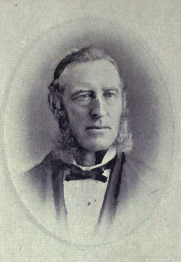

Ontario MPP
- In office 1875–1879
- Preceded by: James Craig
- Succeeded by: Donald Macmaster
- Constituency: Glengarry

Personal details
- Born: March 25, 1829 Glengarry County, Upper Canada
- Died: January 26, 1909 (aged 79)
- Party: Independent-Liberal
- Occupation: Farmer

Alexander James Grant (March 25, 1829 – January 26, 1909) was a Canadian politician.

Born in Glengarry County, Upper Canada, the son of James Grant and Catherine Dingwall, Grant received his education at the schools of Glengarry County, and until twenty-six years of age, assisted his father on the farm. In 1851, he settled on a farm. Early in life, he took an active interest in municipal matters, holding the office of councilor for twenty-five years, and afterwards was elected warden. In 1874 Canadian federal election, he was nominated as an Independent candidate for the riding of Glengarry for the House of Commons of Canada, but was defeated. In 1875, was elected by a large majority for the Ontario Legislature, and during the succeeding session supported Liberal Premier of Ontario Sir Oliver Mowat, but later supported the Conservative party. He has also held the positions of vice-president and president of Glengarry County Agricultural Society, director of the Farmers' Institute of his township, also Captain of No. 1 Company of Glengarry Battalion. In religion, he was a Presbyterian and held the office of elder.

== Electoral history ==
1875 Ontario general election: Glengarry
Party	Candidate	Votes	%	±%
Independent Liberal	Alexander James Grant	1,125	51.07	
Liberal	A. McNab	1,078	48.93	+1.82
Turnout		2,203	74.08	+1.78
Eligible voters		2,974		
Independent Liberal gain from Conservative		Swing		−0.91
Source: Elections Ontario
