= Raisin River (Ontario) =

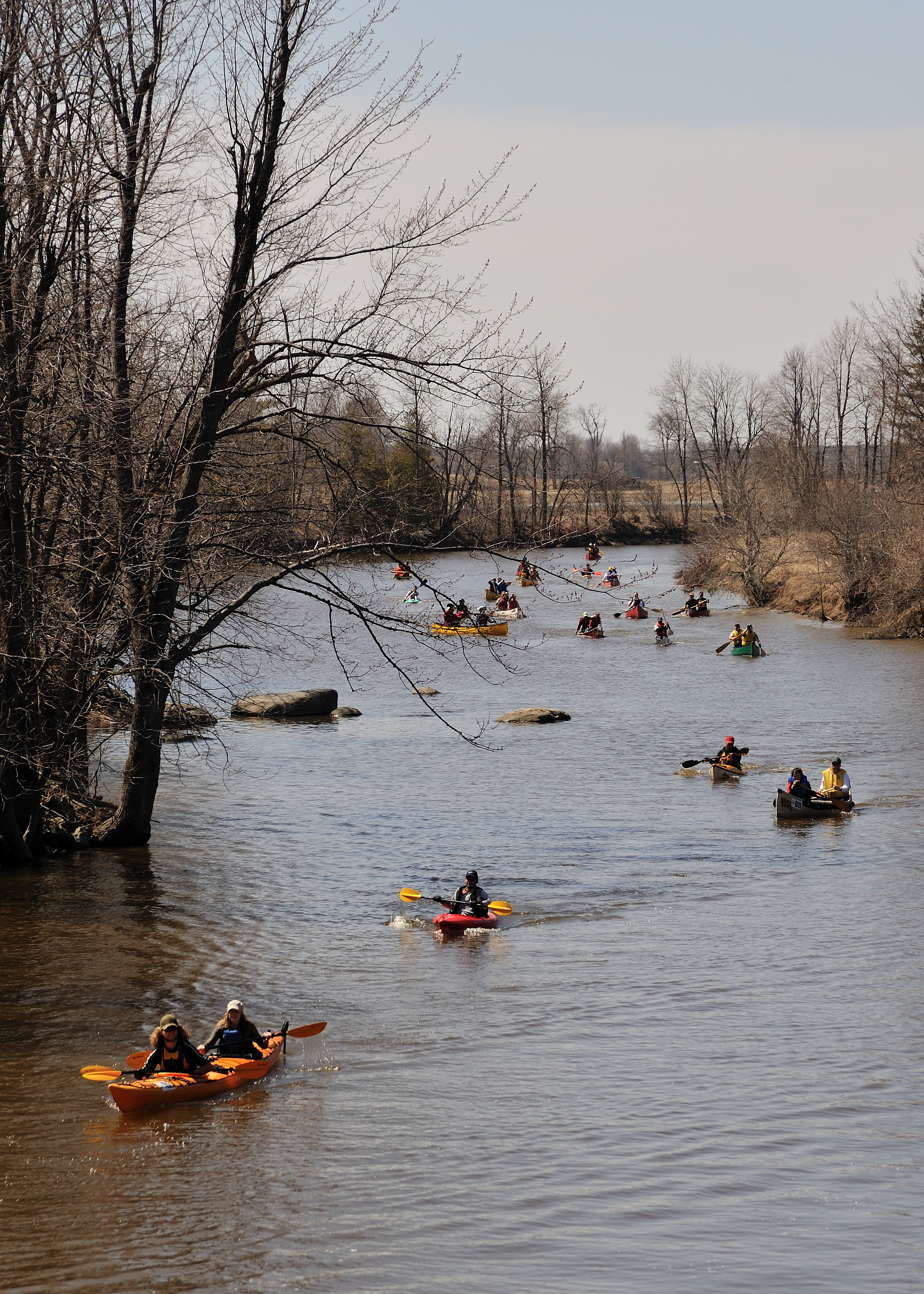
- Annual canoe race on the Raisin River

- Location of the mouth of the Raisin River in Ontario
- Etymology: From the French word raisin (grape)

Location
- Country: Canada
- Province: Ontario
- Region: Eastern Ontario
- County: United Counties of Stormont, Dundas and Glengarry
- Municipalities: South Glengarry; South Stormont

Physical characteristics
- Source: Field
  - location: Newington, South Stormont
  - coordinates: 45°06′55″N 75°02′34″W
  - elevation: 96 m (315 ft)
- Mouth: Lake Saint Francis
  - location: Lancaster, South Glengarry
  - coordinates: 45°07′35″N 74°29′31″W
  - elevation: 43 m (141 ft)
- Basin size: 57.982 km^{2} (22.387 sq mi)
- Discharge
  - average: 5.09 m^{3}/s (180 cu ft/s)

Basin features
- River system: Saint Lawrence River drainage basin
- Tributaries
  - left: North Raisin River
  - right: South Raisin River

The Raisin River is a river in South Stormont and South Glengarry, United Counties of Stormont, Dundas and Glengarry in eastern Ontario, Canada, with the watershed encompassing portions of North Stormont, North Glengarry and the city of Cornwall as well. It empties into Lake Saint Francis on the Saint Lawrence River near the community of Lancaster.

The river's name is an anglicised form of the earlier French settler name "la rivière aux Raisins", which referred to the wild grapes (raisins in French) that can still be found growing along the shores of the river.

== Course ==
The river begins in a field about 2 kilometres (1.2 mi) west of the community of Newington. It travels south to the community of Bunker Hill, then turns east, and takes in the left tributaries Palen Creek, Shaver Drain and Wereley Creek near the community of North Lunenburg. The Raisin River continues east, takes in the left tributary Stoney Creek at the community of Black River, and passes under Ontario Highway 138 at the community of St. Andrews. It heads northeast, takes in the left tributary Beaver Creek and right tributary McIntosh Drain, then the left tributary North Raisin River at the community of Martintown. It heads east, passes into South Glengarry, takes in the right tributary Glen Falloch Drain and left tributary McIntyre Creek, then reaches the community of Williamstown and the right tributary South Raisin River. The river continues east, takes in the right tributary Glen Drain, passes under Ontario Highway 401, and reaches Lake Saint Francis.

== Recreation ==
The "Great Raisin Raisin River Foot Race" is held in Williamstown. In spring, the "Raisin River Canoe Race" runs from Saint Andrews to Williamstown.

== Tributaries ==
- Glen Drain (right)
- South Raisin River (right)
- McIntyre Creek (left)
- Glen Falloch Drain (right)
- North Raisin River (left)
- McIntosh Drain (right)
- Beaver Creek (left)
- Stoney Creek (left)
- Wereley Creek (left)
- Shaver Drain (left)
- Palen Creek (left)

== See also ==
- List of rivers of Ontario

== Sources ==
- "Raisin River". Geographical Names Data Base. Natural Resources Canada.
- "Topographic Map sheets 31G1, 31G2, 31G3". Atlas of Canada. Natural Resources Canada. 2010-02-04.
- "Raisin River Watershed Report Card" (PDF). Raisin Region Conservation Authority. May 2007.
