= Duncan Ross =

Duncan Ross may refer to:

- Duncan Ross (British Columbia politician) (1870–1916), Canadian MP for Yale-Cariboo
- Duncan Graham Ross (1891–1982), Canadian MP for Middlesex West
- Duncan Campbell Ross (1871–1961), Canadian MP for Middlesex East
- Duncan Alexander Ross (1873–1954), Ontario farmer and political figure
- Duncan C. Ross, wrestler in the 1880s
- Duncan Ross (Scottish politician), Scottish nationalist activist and academic
- Duncan Ross (actor), actor in the Santa Barbara cast
