= Donald Robert McDonald =

Canadian politician

Ontario MPP
- In office 1908–1911
- Preceded by: John Angus McMillan
- Succeeded by: Hugh Munro
- In office 1898–1902
- Preceded by: David Murdoch MacPherson
- Succeeded by: William Duncan McLeod
- Constituency: Glengarry

Personal details
- Born: December 11, 1856 Wisconsin, United States
- Died: July 1, 1923 (aged 66) Alberta, Canada
- Party: Conservative
- Spouse(s): Catherine McDonell (m. 1887) Mary Isabella Chisholm (m. 1899)
- Occupation: Farmer

Donald Robert McDonald (December 11, 1856 – 1923) was a contractor, farmer and politician in Ontario. He represented Glengarry from 1898 to 1902 and from 1908 to 1911 in the Legislative Assembly of Ontario as a Conservative.

The son of D.D. McDonald, he was born in Wisconsin and was educated in Williamstown. He was married twice: first to Catherine McDonell in 1887 and then to Mary Isabella Chisholm around 1899. McDonald served as deputy reeve of Charlottenburgh township. He defeated David Murdoch McPherson to win a seat in the provincial assembly in 1898. McDonald ran unsuccessfully for the Glengarry seat in the Canadian House of Commons in 1904, losing to Jacob Schell. After completing his second term in the Ontario assembly, he moved to Alberta and died there in 1923.
