= William Duncan McLeod =

Canadian politician

Ontario MPP
- In office 1902–1904
- Preceded by: Donald Robert McDonald
- Succeeded by: John Angus McMillan
- Constituency: Glengarry

Personal details
- Born: April 4, 1852 Kirk Hill, Glengarry County, Canada West
- Died: August 14, 1908 (aged 56) Glengarry County, Ontario
- Party: Conservative
- Spouse: Jane McDougall (m. 1875)
- Occupation: Farmer

William Duncan McLeod (April 4, 1852 – August 14, 1908) was a cheese maker, farmer and politician in Ontario. He represented Glengarry from 1902 to 1904 in the Legislative Assembly of Ontario as a Conservative.

The son of Kenneth McLeod and Ann Duncan, he was born in Kirk Hill, Glengarry County, Canada West. In 1875, he married Jane McDougall. McLeod dealt in cheese and owned several factories. He was defeated by John Angus McMillan when he ran for reelection in 1904. He died four years later.
