= Hugh Munro (Canadian politician) =

Canadian politician

Ontario MPP
- In office 1911–1919
- Preceded by: Donald Robert McDonald
- Succeeded by: Duncan Alexander Ross
- Constituency: Glengarry

Personal details
- Born: March 22, 1854 Charlottenburg Township, Canada West
- Died: July 1, 1939 (aged 85) Edmonton, Alberta, Canada
- Party: Liberal
- Occupation: Blacksmith

Hugh Munro (March 22, 1854 – 1939) was an Ontario blacksmith and political figure. He represented Glengarry in the Legislative Assembly of Ontario as a Liberal member from 1911 to 1919.

He was born in Charlottenburg Township, Canada West, the son of Donald Munro. In 1883, Munro married Emma McCracken. With a partner, he manufactured carriages at a plant Alexandria. At one time, the plant employed as many as 300 people, but was put out of business by the introduction of automobiles. Munro also served as reeve and mayor for Alexandria. He died in Edmonton, Alberta.
