= Glengarry (provincial electoral district) =

Ontario electoral district

Defunct provincial electoral district
- Legislature: Legislative Assembly of Ontario
- District created: 1867
- District abolished: 1973
- First contested: 1867
- Last contested: 1971

Glengarry was an electoral riding in Ontario, Canada. It was created in 1867 at the time of confederation and was abolished in 1973 before the 1975 election. The riding roughly corresponded to the territory of Glengarry County.

In the electoral redistribution of 1975, Glengarry was merged into Stormont—Dundas and Glengarry, which became Stormont-Dundas-Glengarry and East Grenville in 1987.

There was a Glengarry district used to elect a member of the Legislative Assembly of Upper Canada previous to Confederation, starting in 1792.

== Members of Provincial Parliament ==
Glengarry
Assembly	Years	Member	Party
1st	1867–1871	James Craig	Conservative
2nd	1871–1874	James Craig	Conservative
3rd	1875–1879	Alexander James Grant	Independent Liberal
4th	1879–1882	Donald Macmaster	Conservative
4th	1882–1883	James Rayside	Liberal
5th	1883–1886	James Rayside	Liberal
6th	1886–1890	James Rayside	Liberal
7th	1890–1894	James Rayside	Liberal
8th	1894–1898	David Murdoch McPherson	Patrons of Industry
9th	1898–1902	Donald Robert McDonald	Conservative
10th	1902–1904	William Duncan McLeod	Conservative
11th	1905–1908	John Angus McMillan	Liberal
12th	1908–1911	Donald Robert McDonald	Conservative
13th	1911–1914	Hugh Munro	Liberal
14th	1914–1919	Hugh Munro	Liberal
15th	1919–1923	Duncan Alexander Ross	United Farmers
16th	1923–1926	James Alexander Sangster	Liberal
17th	1926–1929	Angus McGillis	Conservative
18th	1929–1934	James Alexander Sangster	Liberal
19th	1934–1937	James Alexander Sangster	Liberal
20th	1937–1943	Edmund MacGillivray	Liberal
21st	1943–1945	Edmund MacGillivray	Liberal
22nd	1945–1948	Edmund MacGillivray	Liberal
23rd	1948–1951	Osie Villeneuve	Progressive Conservative
24th	1951–1955	Osie Villeneuve	Progressive Conservative
25th	1955–1957	Osie Villeneuve	Progressive Conservative
25th	1957–1959	Fernand Guindon	Progressive Conservative
26th	1959–1963	Fernand Guindon	Progressive Conservative
27th	1963–1967	Osie Villeneuve	Progressive Conservative
28th	1967–1971	Osie Villeneuve	Progressive Conservative
29th	1971–1975	Osie Villeneuve	Progressive Conservative
Stormont—Dundas and Glengarry
28th	1975–1977	Osie Villeneuve	Progressive Conservative
30th	1977–1981	Osie Villeneuve	Progressive Conservative
31st	1981–1983	Osie Villeneuve	Progressive Conservative
31st	1983–1985	Noble Villeneuve	Progressive Conservative
32nd	1985–1987	Noble Villeneuve	Progressive Conservative
Stormont-Dundas-Glengarry and East Grenville
33rd	1987–1990	Noble Villeneuve	Progressive Conservative
34th	1990–1995	Noble Villeneuve	Progressive Conservative
35th	1995–1999	Noble Villeneuve	Progressive Conservative
Sourced from the Ontario Legislative Assembly
Merged into Stormont—Dundas—Charlottenburgh before the 1999 election

== Election results ==
=== Stormont—Dundas—Glengarry and East Grenville (1987–1999) ===
1995 Ontario general election: Stormont—Dundas—Glengarry and East Grenville
Party	Candidate	Votes	%	±%
Progressive Conservative	Noble Villeneuve	18,884	64.69	+23.82
Liberal	Denis Sabourin	7,594	26.01	–2.82
New Democratic	Michael Cowley-Owen	2,285	7.83	–10.59
Natural Law	Andrew Featherstone	428	1.47	–
Total valid votes		29,191	99.27	
Total rejected, unmarked and declined ballots		215	0.73	+0.03
Turnout		29,406	62.48	–3.29
Eligible voters		47,066		
Progressive Conservative hold		Swing		+13.32
Source: Elections Ontario

1990 Ontario general election: Stormont—Dundas—Glengarry and East Grenville
Party	Candidate	Votes	%	±%
Progressive Conservative	Noble Villeneuve	11,887	40.87	+2.49
Liberal	Denis Sabourin	8,386	28.84	–7.38
New Democratic	Helena McCuaig	5,357	18.42	+10.06
Confederation of Regions	Bernie Lauzon	3,452	11.87	–
Total valid votes		29,082	99.30	
Total rejected, unmarked and declined ballots		206	0.70	+0.38
Turnout		29,288	65.77	–1.23
Eligible voters		44,532		
Progressive Conservative hold		Swing		+4.94
Source: Elections Ontario

1987 Ontario general election: Stormont—Dundas—Glengarry and East Grenville
Party	Candidate	Votes	%	±%
Progressive Conservative	Noble Villeneuve	10,771	38.38	–21.65
Liberal	Gerry Rosenquist	10,164	36.22	+4.02
Independent	Gordon E. McGregor	4,784	17.05	–
New Democratic	Arthur Carkner	2,345	8.36	+0.58
Total valid votes		28,064	99.67	
Total rejected ballots		92	0.33	–0.13
Turnout		28,156	67.00	+5.12
Eligible voters		42,026		
Progressive Conservative hold		Swing		–12.84
Source: Elections Ontario

=== Stormont—Dundas and Glengarry (1975–1987) ===
1985 Ontario general election: Stormont—Dundas and Glengarry
Party	Candidate	Votes	%	±%
Progressive Conservative	Noble Villeneuve	13,119	60.03	+1.90
Liberal	Bill Dillabough	7,036	32.19	–6.23
New Democratic	Rudi Derstroff	1,700	7.78	+4.79
Total valid votes		21,855	99.54	
Total rejected ballots		101	0.46	+0.06
Turnout		21,956	61.88	+0.65
Eligible voters		35,482		
Progressive Conservative hold		Swing		+4.06
Source: Elections Ontario

Ontario provincial by-election, December 15, 1983: Stormont—Dundas and Glengarry Death of Osie Villeneuve
Party	Candidate	Votes	%	±%
Progressive Conservative	Noble Villeneuve	12,197	58.13	+2.75
Liberal	Johnny Whitteker	8,062	38.42	+2.26
New Democratic	Rudi Derstroff	627	2.99	–5.47
Independent	John Turmel	97	0.46	–
Total valid votes		20,983	99.60	
Total rejected ballots		85	0.40	+0.12
Turnout		21,068	61.23	–4.66
Eligible voters		34,406		
Progressive Conservative hold		Swing		+0.24
Source: Elections Ontario

1981 Ontario general election: Stormont—Dundas and Glengarry
Party	Candidate	Votes	%	±%
Progressive Conservative	Osie Villeneuve	12,017	55.38	+6.23
Liberal	Gerry Rosenquist	7,846	36.16	–1.69
New Democratic	Joe O'Neill	1,836	8.46	–4.55
Total valid votes		21,699	99.72	
Total rejected ballots		61	0.28	–0.05
Turnout		21,760	65.89	–2.33
Eligible voters		33,024		
Progressive Conservative hold		Swing		+3.96
Source: Elections Ontario

1977 Ontario general election: Stormont—Dundas and Glengarry
Party	Candidate	Votes	%	±%
Progressive Conservative	Osie Villeneuve	10,533	49.15	–3.39
Liberal	Johnny C. Whitteker	8,111	37.85	+3.98
New Democratic	Joe O'Neill	2,788	13.01	–0.59
Total valid votes		21,432	99.67	
Total rejected ballots		72	0.33	+0.03
Turnout		21,504	68.22	–0.72
Eligible voters		31,522		
Progressive Conservative hold		Swing		–3.69
Source: Elections Ontario

1975 Ontario general election: Stormont—Dundas and Glengarry
Party	Candidate	Votes	%	±%
Progressive Conservative	Osie Villeneuve	10,833	52.54	–1.18
Liberal	Peter Manley	6,982	33.86	+2.01
New Democratic	Gerald Lussier	2,804	13.60	+1.17
Total valid votes		20,619	99.70	
Total rejected ballots		63	0.30	
Turnout		20,682	68.94	
Eligible voters		30,002		
Progressive Conservative hold		Swing		–1.60
Source: Elections Ontario

=== Glengarry (1867–1975) ===
1971 Ontario general election
Party	Candidate	Votes	%	±%
Progressive Conservative	Osie Villeneuve	7,496	55.72	+2.75
Liberal	Jean-Paul Touchette	4,285	31.85	–8.83
New Democratic	Ernie Lalonde	1,672	12.43	+6.08
Total valid votes		13,453	99.19	
Total rejected ballots		110	0.81	–0.38
Turnout		13,563	75.27	+0.96
Eligible voters		18,019		
Progressive Conservative hold		Swing		+5.79
Source: Elections Ontario

1967 Ontario general election
Party	Candidate	Votes	%	±%
Progressive Conservative	Osie Villeneuve	6,214	52.97	–3.28
Liberal	Gerard Brunet	4,773	40.68	–1.26
New Democratic	Tom Aitken	745	6.35	+4.55
Total valid votes		11,732	98.81	
Total rejected ballots		141	1.19	+0.46
Turnout		11,873	74.31	–0.65
Eligible voters		15,978		
Progressive Conservative hold		Swing		–1.01
Source: Elections Ontario

1963 Ontario general election
Party	Candidate	Votes	%	±%
Progressive Conservative	Osie Villeneuve	5,361	56.25	+5.87
Liberal	William Major	3,998	41.95	–7.67
New Democratic	Betty Latreille	172	1.80	–
Total valid votes		9,531	99.27	
Total rejected ballots		70	0.73	–0.52
Turnout		9,601	74.96	+4.35
Eligible voters		12,809		
Progressive Conservative hold		Swing		+6.77
Source: Elections Ontario

1959 Ontario general election
Party	Candidate	Votes	%	±%
Progressive Conservative	Fernand Guindon	4,575	50.38	–12.77
Liberal	William Major	4,506	49.62	+12.77
Total valid votes		9,081	98.75	
Total rejected ballots		115	1.25	+0.45
Turnout		9,196	70.61	+8.91
Eligible voters		13,024		
Progressive Conservative hold		Swing		–12.77
Source: Elections Ontario

Ontario provincial by-election, September 5, 1957 Resignation of Osie Villeneuve
Party	Candidate	Votes	%	±%
Progressive Conservative	Fernand Guindon	5,006	63.15	+1.67
Liberal	John F. McLennan	2,921	36.85	–1.67
Total valid votes		7,927	99.20	
Total rejected ballots		64	0.80	–0.43
Turnout		7,991	61.70	–12.70
Eligible voters		12,951		
Progressive Conservative hold		Swing		+1.67
Source: Elections Ontario

1955 Ontario general election
Party	Candidate	Votes	%	±%
Progressive Conservative	Osie Villeneuve	5,635	61.48	+6.25
Liberal	D. John Dolan	3,531	38.52	–6.25
Total valid votes		9,166	98.77	
Total rejected ballots		114	1.23	+0.47
Turnout		9,280	74.41	–1.82
Eligible voters		12,472		
Progressive Conservative hold		Swing		+6.25
Source: Elections Ontario

1951 Ontario general election
Party	Candidate	Votes	%	±%
Progressive Conservative	Osie Villeneuve	5,298	55.23	–0.52
Liberal	D. John Dolan	4,295	44.77	+6.96
Total valid votes		9,593	99.24	
Total rejected ballots		73	0.76	–0.12
Turnout		9,666	76.23	+4.60
Eligible voters		12,680		
Progressive Conservative hold		Swing		–3.74
Source: Elections Ontario

1948 Ontario general election
Party	Candidate	Votes	%	±%
Progressive Conservative	Osie Villeneuve	5,557	55.75	+16.68
Liberal	Edmund MacGillivray	3,769	37.81	–17.09
Union of Electors	Ron Gostick	642	6.44	–
Total valid votes		9,968	99.12	
Total rejected ballots		88	0.88	+0.10
Turnout		10,056	71.63	–1.51
Eligible voters		14,039		
Progressive Conservative gain from Liberal		Swing		+16.88
Source: Elections Ontario

1945 Ontario general election
Party	Candidate	Votes	%	±%
Liberal	Edmund MacGillivray	5,594	54.90	–4.70
Progressive Conservative	Osie Villeneuve	3,981	39.07	+5.11
Co-operative Commonwealth	John J. McDonald	615	6.04	–0.41
Total valid votes		10,190	99.22	
Total rejected ballots		80	0.78	+0.13
Turnout		10,270	73.14	+19.63
Eligible voters		14,041		
Liberal hold		Swing		–4.91
Source: Elections Ontario

1943 Ontario general election
Party	Candidate	Votes	%	±%
Liberal	Edmund MacGillivray	4,495	59.60	–7.60
Progressive Conservative	Lionel Deveaux	2,561	33.96	+1.16
Co-operative Commonwealth	Kenneth L. Walter	486	6.44	–
Total valid votes		7,542	99.35	
Total rejected ballots		49	0.65	–0.37
Turnout		7,591	53.51	–18.49
Eligible voters		14,185		
Liberal hold		Swing		–4.38
Source: Elections Ontario

1937 Ontario general election
Party	Candidate	Votes	%	±%
Liberal	Edmund MacGillivray	6,737	67.20	+5.66
Conservative	Joseph St. Denis	3,288	32.80	–5.66
Total valid votes		10,025	98.98	
Total rejected ballots		103	1.02	+0.36
Turnout		10,128	72.00	+3.67
Eligible voters		14,066		
Liberal hold		Swing		+5.66
Source: Elections Ontario

1934 Ontario general election
Party	Candidate	Votes	%	±%
Liberal	James Alexander Sangster	6,391	61.55	+11.20
Conservative	J. Domina Villeneuve	3,993	38.45	–11.20
Total valid votes		10,384	99.34	
Total rejected ballots		69	0.66	+0.20
Turnout		10,453	68.33	+7.13
Eligible voters		15,298		
Liberal hold		Swing		+11.20
Source: Elections Ontario

1929 Ontario general election
Party	Candidate	Votes	%	±%
Liberal	James Alexander Sangster	3,290	50.34	+13.51
Conservative	Angus McGillis	3,245	49.66	–13.51
Total valid votes		6,535	99.54	
Total rejected ballots		30	0.46	–0.09
Turnout		6,565	61.20	–2.61
Eligible voters		10,728		
Liberal gain from Conservative		Swing		+13.51
Source: Elections Ontario

1926 Ontario general election
Party	Candidate	Votes	%	±%
Conservative	Angus McGillis	4,442	63.17	–
Liberal	James Alexander Sangster	2,590	36.83	–17.69
Total valid votes		7,032	99.45	
Total rejected ballots		39	0.55	–0.47
Turnout		7,071	63.81	+9.54
Eligible voters		11,082		
Conservative gain from Liberal		Swing		–
Source: Elections Ontario

1923 Ontario general election
Party	Candidate	Votes	%	±%
Liberal	James Alexander Sangster	3,313	54.53	+21.17
United Farmers	Duncan Alexander Ross	2,763	45.47	–21.17
Total valid votes		6,076	98.97	
Total rejected ballots		63	1.03	–0.03
Turnout		6,139	54.27	–5.86
Eligible voters		11,313		
Liberal gain from United Farmers		Swing		+21.17
Source: Elections Ontario

1919 Ontario general election
Party	Candidate	Votes	%	±%
United Farmers	Duncan Alexander Ross	4,554	66.65	–
Liberal	Archibald John Macdonald	2,279	33.35	–
Total valid votes		6,833	98.94	
Total rejected ballots		73	1.06	–
Turnout		6,906	60.12	–
Eligible voters		11,487		
United Farmers gain from Liberal		Swing		–
Source: Elections Ontario

1914 Ontario general election
Party	Candidate	Votes
Liberal	Hugh Munro	acclaimed
Source: Elections Ontario

1911 Ontario general election
Party	Candidate	Votes	%	±%
Liberal	Hugh Munro	1,988	53.56	+6.63
Conservative	Donald M. Robertson	1,724	46.44	–6.63
Total valid votes		3,712	99.57	
Total rejected ballots		16	0.43	–0.32
Turnout		3,728	67.83	–9.58
Eligible voters		5,496		
Liberal gain from Conservative		Swing		+6.63
Source: Elections Ontario

1908 Ontario general election
Party	Candidate	Votes	%	±%
Conservative	Donald Robert McDonald	2,170	53.07	+6.24
Liberal	Alexander W. McDougall	1,919	46.93	–6.24
Total valid votes		4,089	99.25	
Total rejected ballots		31	0.75	+0.25
Turnout		4,120	77.41	+3.13
Eligible voters		5,322		
Conservative gain from Liberal		Swing		+6.24
Source: Elections Ontario

1905 Ontario general election
Party	Candidate	Votes	%	±%
Liberal	John Angus McMillan	2,214	53.17	+9.59
Conservative	William Duncan McLeod	1,950	46.83	–9.59
Total valid votes		4,164	99.50	
Total rejected ballots		21	0.50	–0.60
Turnout		4,185	74.28	+5.14
Eligible voters		5,634		
Liberal gain from Conservative		Swing		+9.59
Source: Elections Ontario

1902 Ontario general election
Party	Candidate	Votes	%	±%
Conservative	William Duncan McLeod	2,128	56.42	+9.06
Liberal	David Murdoch MacPherson	1,644	43.58	+26.71
Total valid votes		3,772	98.90	
Total rejected ballots		42	1.10	+0.85
Turnout		3,814	69.14	–4.67
Eligible voters		5,516		
Conservative hold		Swing		+17.88
Source: Elections Ontario

1898 Ontario general election
Party	Candidate	Votes	%	±%
Conservative	Donald Robert McDonald	1,905	47.35	–
Independent	David Murdoch MacPherson	1,439	35.77	–19.45
Liberal	D. C. McRae	679	16.88	–
Total valid votes		4,023	99.75	
Total rejected ballots		10	0.25	–0.10
Turnout		4,033	73.81	+2.85
Eligible voters		5,464		
Conservative gain from Liberal-Patrons of Industry		Swing		+9.73
Source: Elections Ontario

1894 Ontario general election
Party	Candidate	Votes	%	±%
Liberal-Patrons of Industry	David Murdoch MacPherson	2,030	55.22	–
Independent	G. H. McGillivray	1,646	44.78	–
Total valid votes		3,676	99.65	
Total rejected ballots		13	0.35	–0.14
Turnout		3,689	70.96	+4.57
Eligible voters		5,199		
Liberal-Patrons of Industry gain from Liberal		Swing		+0.00
Source: Elections Ontario

1890 Ontario general election
Party	Candidate	Votes	%	±%
Liberal	James Rayside	1,756	53.96	+3.50
Conservative	A. D. McPhee	1,498	46.04	–3.50
Total valid votes		3,254	99.51	
Total rejected ballots		16	0.49	–0.27
Turnout		3,270	66.38	–10.52
Eligible voters		4,926		
Liberal hold		Swing		+3.50
Source: Elections Ontario

1886 Ontario general election
Party	Candidate	Votes	%	±%
Liberal	James Rayside	1,723	50.47	–1.60
Conservative	Roderick R. McLennan	1,691	49.53	+1.60
Total valid votes		3,414	99.24	
Total rejected ballots		26	0.76	+0.04
Turnout		3,440	76.91	+2.73
Eligible voters		4,473		
Liberal hold		Swing		–1.60
Source: Elections Ontario

1883 Ontario general election
Party	Candidate	Votes	%	±%
Liberal	James Rayside	1,436	52.07	+0.68
Conservative	Roderick R. McLennan	1,322	47.93	–0.68
Total valid votes		2,758	99.28	
Total rejected ballots		20	0.72	+0.72
Turnout		2,778	74.18	–
Eligible voters		3,745		
Liberal hold		Swing		+0.68
Source: Elections Ontario

Ontario provincial by-election, October 18, 1882 Resignation of James Rayside to contest the 1882 federal election
Party	Candidate	Votes	%	±%
Liberal	James Rayside	1,295	51.39	+2.17
Conservative	Mr. McArthur	1,225	48.61	–2.17
Total valid votes		2,520	100.00	
Total rejected ballots		–		
Turnout		2,520	–	–
Eligible voters				
Liberal gain from Conservative		Swing		+2.17
Source: Elections Ontario

1879 Ontario general election
Party	Candidate	Votes	%	±%
Conservative	Donald Macmaster	1,331	50.78	
Liberal	James Rayside	1,290	49.22	+0.28
Total valid votes		2,621	74.31	+0.24
Eligible voters		3,527		
Conservative gain from Independent Liberal		Swing		−0.14
Source: Elections Ontario

1875 Ontario general election
Party	Candidate	Votes	%	±%
Independent Liberal	Alexander James Grant	1,125	51.07	
Liberal	Archibald McNab	1,078	48.93	+1.82
Turnout		2,203	74.08	+1.78
Eligible voters		2,974		
Independent Liberal gain from Conservative		Swing		−0.91
Source: Elections Ontario

1871 Ontario general election
Party	Candidate	Votes	%	±%
Conservative	James Craig	962	52.89	−3.83
Liberal	R.R. McLennan	857	47.11	+3.83
Turnout		1,819	72.30	−10.29
Eligible voters		2,516		
Conservative hold		Swing		−3.83
Source: Elections Ontario

1867 Ontario general election
Party	Candidate	Votes	%
Conservative	James Craig	1,149	56.71
Liberal	Archibald McNab	877	43.29
Total valid votes		2,026	82.59
Eligible voters		2,453	
Conservative pickup new district.			
Source: Elections Ontario
