= Black River, Ontario =

Black River
- Location in southern Ontario
- Coordinates: 45°04′43″N 74°52′16″W
- Country: Canada
- Province: Ontario
- County: United Counties of Stormont, Dundas and Glengarry
- Municipality: South Stormont
- Elevation: 77 m (253 ft)
- Time zone: UTC-5 (Eastern Time Zone)
  - Summer (DST): UTC-4 (Eastern Time Zone)
- Postal Code FSA: K0C
- Area codes: 613, 343

Black River is an unincorporated Dispersed Rural Community in the municipality of South Stormont, United Counties of Stormont, Dundas and Glengarry in eastern Ontario, Canada. It is located about 2 kilometres (1.2 mi) north of Ontario Highway 401 and 5 kilometres (3.1 mi) northeast of the community of Long Sault, and is on the Raisin River.

== See also ==
- Black River-Matheson, Ontario, a township municipality in Cochrane District
