= Duncan Alexander Ross =

Canadian politician

Ontario MPP
- In office 1919–1923
- Preceded by: Hugh Munro
- Succeeded by: James Alexander Sangster
- Constituency: Glengarry

Personal details
- Born: November 4, 1873 Stormont County, Ontario, Canada
- Died: March 2, 1954 (aged 80) Martintown, Ontario, Canada
- Party: United Farmers
- Spouse: Laura Clifford McGregor
- Occupation: Farmer

Duncan Alexander Ross (November 4, 1873 – March 2, 1954) was an Ontario farmer and political figure. He represented Glengarry in the Legislative Assembly of Ontario from 1919 to 1923 as a United Farmers member.

== Biography ==
He was born in Charlottenburg Township, Ontario, the son of Donald Ross, and was educated at the Ontario Agricultural College in Guelph. Ross married first Jemima Dingwall and second Laura Clifford McGregor. He was a director for the Glengarry Mutual Fire Insurance Company. He served as a member of the Canadian Farm Loan Board (later Farm Credit Canada) from 1943 to 1948. He died at his home in Martintown on March 2, 1954, and was buried at North Branch Cemetery.
