= Edmund MacGillivray =

Canadian politician (1893–1949)

Ontario MPP
- In office 1937–1948
- Preceded by: James Alexander Sangster
- Succeeded by: Osie Villeneuve
- Constituency: Glengarry

Personal details
- Born: 1893 Alexandria, Ontario, Canada
- Died: 1949 (aged 55–56) Alexandria, Ontario, Canada
- Party: Liberal

Edmund A. MacGillivray (1893 - 1949) was a political figure in the Canadian province of Ontario, who represented Glengarry in the Legislative Assembly of Ontario as a Liberal member from 1937 to 1948.

== Background ==
MacGillivray was born in Alexandria, Ontario in 1893. He was a member of the Ontario Public Utilities Commission from 1931 to 1934. He was an avid curler and was president of the Eastern Ontario Lacrosse Association.

== Politics ==
MacGillivray first foray into politics was as reeve of the town of Alexandria.

In the 1937 provincial election, he ran as the Liberal candidate in the eastern Ontario riding of Glengarry. He defeated the Conservative Party candidate Josph St. Denis by 3,369 votes. He was re-elected in 1943. In the 1945 election, he faced Progressive Conservative Party Osie Villeneuve and defeated him by 1,613 votes. He faced Villeneuve again in the 1948 election, and this time was defeated by MacGillivray by 1,788 votes.
