= Francis Marnham =

Member of Parliament for Chertsey
- In office 1906 – 28 November 1910
- Preceded by: George Bingham
- Succeeded by: Donald Macmaster

Personal details
- Born: 23 September 1853
- Died: 18 January 1941 (aged 87)
- Party: Liberal

Francis John Marnham (23 September 1853 – 18 January 1941) was a British Liberal politician and businessman.

== Business ==
He was a member of the Stock Exchange, but he retired from business when he was 32.

== Politics ==
In 1906 he was elected Liberal MP for Chertsey at the General Election, gaining the seat from the Conservatives with a majority of just 99 votes. The result was something of a surprise to the local Liberals and Marnham in particular.

In 1908, although he had retired from the Stock Exchange, he expressed a desire to stand-down from parliament due to the "strains of parliamentary life".

In 1910 he stood down from parliament and did not contest the January General Election, which saw the Conservative Party re-gain the seat. A year later he went to live at Torquay.

In 1926 he served a one-year term as Mayor of Torquay; it was one of the rare occasions when the Town Council selected a chief magistrate from outside its own members. He had been chairman of Torquay Council of Social Service, a Justice of the Peace, and was prominently associated with Upton Vale Baptist Church.

Parliament of the United Kingdom
| Preceded by George Bingham | Member of Parliament for Chertsey; 1906–1910 | Succeeded by Donald Macmaster |
