= Alexander Macdonell (bishop of Kingston) =

Roman Catholic bishop of Kingston, Upper Canada (1762–1840)

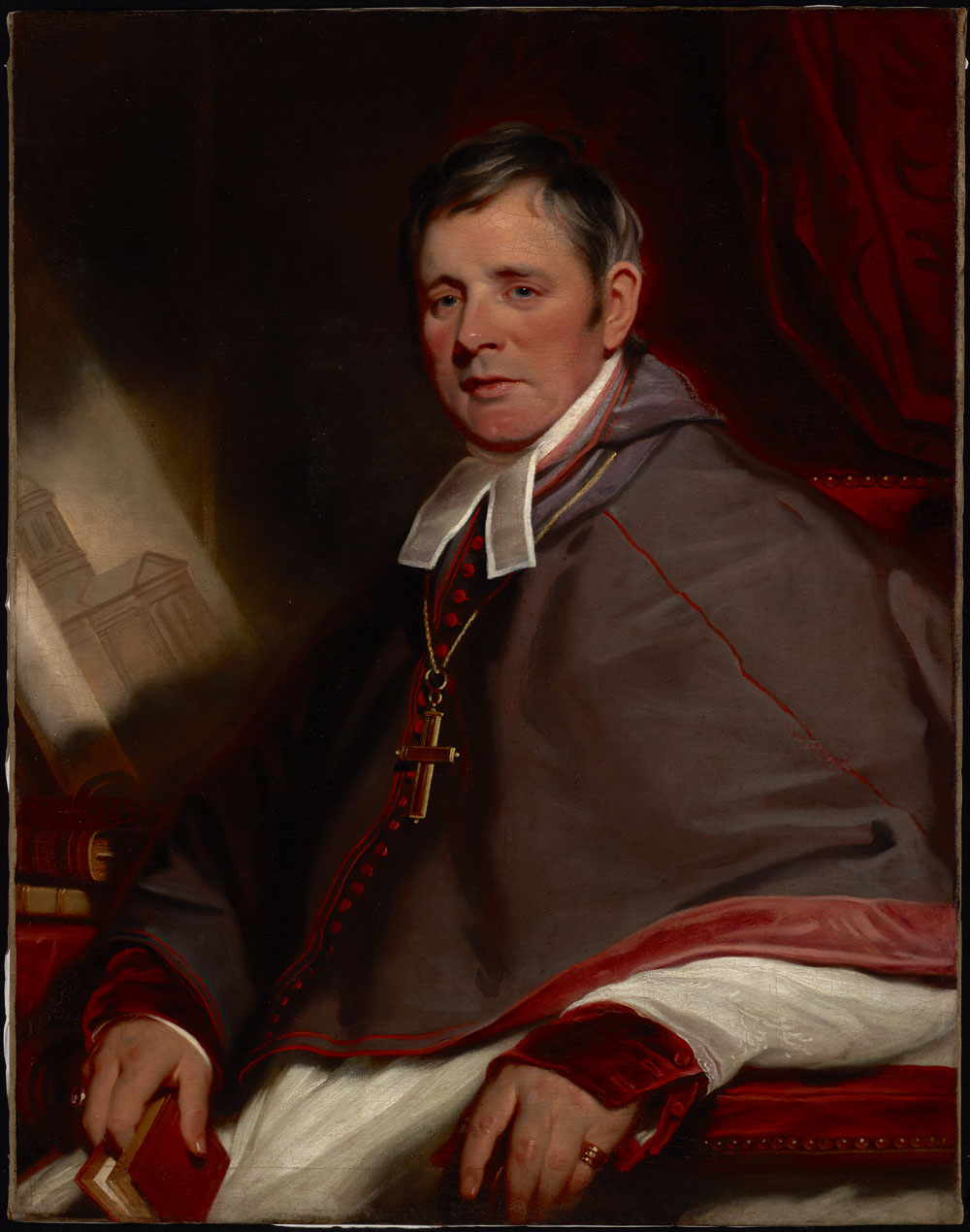
- MacDonell c. 1823 by Martin Archer Shee

Personal life
- Born: 17 July 1762 Glen Urquhart, Scotland
- Died: 14 January 1840 (aged 77) Dumfries, Scotland

Bishop Alexander Macdonell (17 July 1762 – 14 January 1840) was the first Roman Catholic bishop of Kingston, Upper Canada.

He was born in Glen Urquhart, Inchlaggan, Scotland and served a chaplain with the Glengarry Fencibles during the Irish Rebellion of 1798. His presence insured that the regiment "distinguished itself by its humanity". When the regiment was demobilized, most of the soldiers found themselves unemployed and destitute. He led them to Canada, where they received a grant of land for their service.

When Macdonell arrived in 1804, he found three priests and three churches in Upper Canada. By his energy and perseverance he induced a considerable immigration to the province, and left at his death forty-eight churches attended by thirty priests, plus a seminary and a college.

== Early years ==
Alexander Macdonell was born 17 July 1760/62 at his father's house in Glen Urquhart. His early education was at Bourblach, Loch Morar. Around 1775 he went to the Scots Colleges at Paris and Valladolid. He was ordained a priest on 16 February 1787 at Valladolid. Returning to his native land he exercised the ministry for five years in Lochaber, where he was known as "Big Sandy" or "Mr. Alistair".

=== Glengarry Fencibles ===
In 1792 his people were evicted from their homes during the Highland Clearances. Despite the fact that, the penal laws still being enforced, being a Catholic priest he was an outlaw, Macdonell involved himself in their affairs and persuaded Glasgow business men to employ them while he acted as the Highlanders priest and interpreter (for they were Catholics in a predominantly Protestant town and spoke Scottish Gaelic not Scottish English). He also used his influence on behalf of some from Barra who attempted to emigrate but wound up shipwrecked and destitute near Glasgow. In May 1792, with permission of the apostolic vicar, Macdonell took up residence in Glasgow and found work for about 800 Highlanders.

Within two years after the Highlanders' arrival in Glasgow, the Revolution on the Continent ruined the export trade of Glasgow and deprived them of their livelihood. The only avenue open to the unemployed was service in the militia, but even this was closed to the Glengarry men, who, being Catholics, could not take the required oath for enlistment. Father Macdonell then drafted a proposal that the Highlanders be commissioned as a Catholic regiment in service to the government. Clan chief Alexander Ranaldson Macdonell and John Fletcher of Dunans went to London and presented the documents to King George III, along with letters of commendation from the Glasgow merchants. Letters of service were accordingly issued in August, 1794. Though contrary to the then existing law, Father Alexander Macdonell was gazetted as chaplain to the regiment, thus becoming the first Catholic chaplain in the British Army since the Reformation. A Presbyterian clergyman was appointed as well for those of that persuasion. More than half the regiment that numbered 800, were from the area of Glengarry. In June, 1795, the regiment was deployed to Guernsey, where it remained until the summer of 1798, when it was moved to Ireland.

Laggan Hill and was involved in some skirmishing at Kilkenny, Hackett's Town and New Ross.

"They everywhere won golden opinions by their humane behavior towards the vanquished, which was in striking contrast with the floggings, burnings, and hangings which formed the daily occupation of the rest of the military. Father Macdonell, who accompanied the regiment in all their enterprises, was instrumental in fostering this... The Catholic chapels in many places had been turned into stables by the yeomanry, and these he caused to be restored to their proper use. He often said mass himself in these humble places of devotion, and invited the inhabitants to leave their hiding places and resume once more their wonted occupations, assuring them of the king's protection, if they behaved quietly and peaceably. Such timely exhortations had almost magical effect, though the terror-stricken population could scarcely believe their eyes when they beheld a regiment of Roman Catholics, speaking their language, and among them a soggarth, a priest, assuring them of immunity from a government immemorially associated with every species of wrong and oppression."

An American bishop gave testimony to the chaplain's services: "The memory of Father Macdonell is as green in those regions as the fields they cultivate. That holy, chivalrous priest saved the lives of many innocent Irishmen and restored the chapels to their original purpose."

== Canada ==
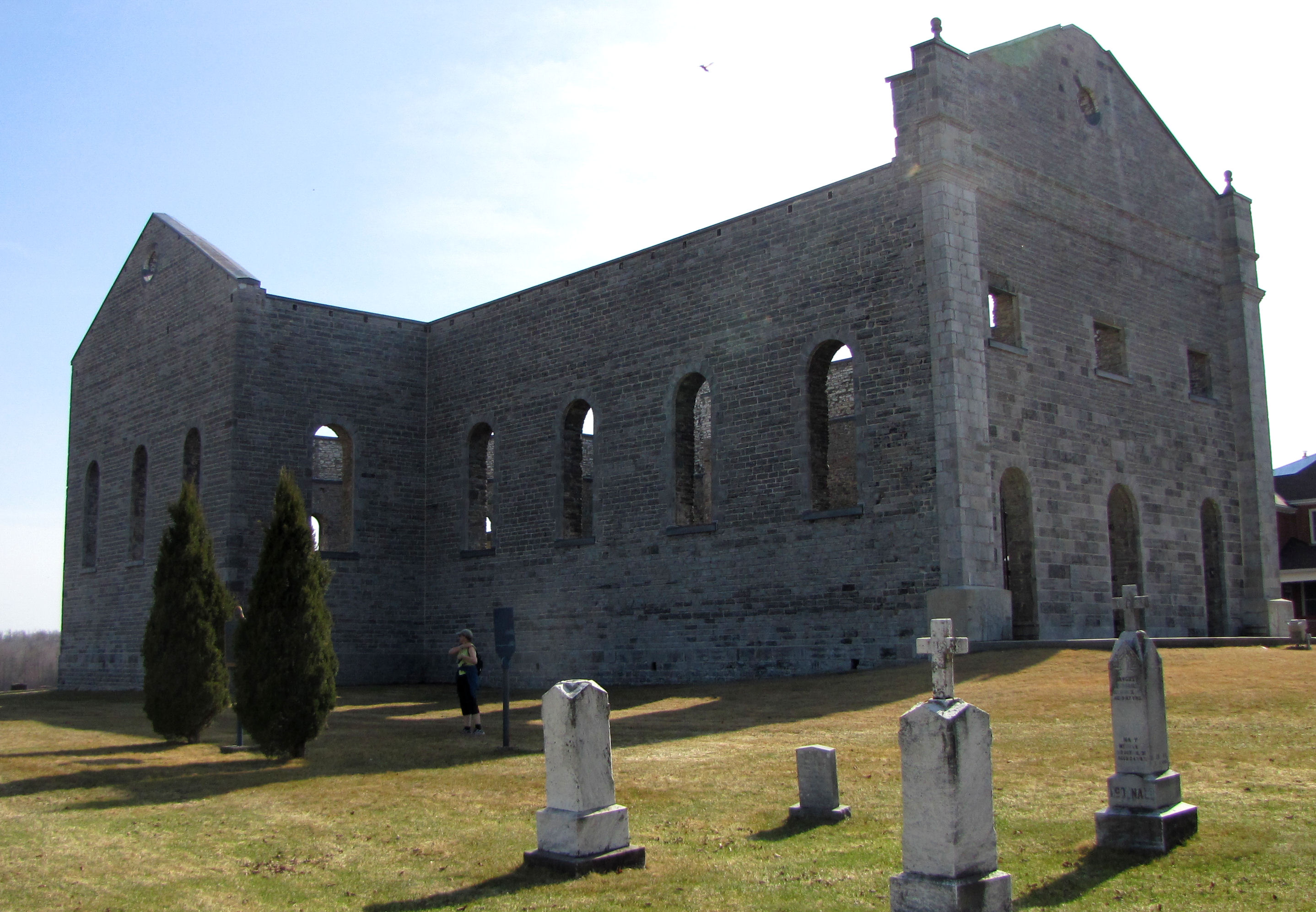
Ruins of St. Raphael Church, South Glengarry

The Glengarry Fencibles were sent to Ireland during the Rebellion of 1798. The regiment saw action at When the regiment was disbanded in Glasgow in 1802, Rev. Macdonell appealed to the government to grant its members land in Canada. The government countered with a proposal for the recently acquired island of Trinidad, but Macdonell held fast. Influential lairds and landholders raised objections to "depopulating" the land, and the Emigration Act rigidly enforced. With all the obstacles placed in his way, Bernard Kelly says, "he may be literally said 'to have smuggled his friends away'"

Father Macdonell arrived at York, Upper Canada (now Toronto), 1 November 1804, and proceeded to settle the people on the lands granted by the British government. The area was part of the Diocese of Quebec. Macdonell, was assigned to the mission of St. Raphael's in Glengarry, which he made his headquarters for twenty-five years. On his arrival he found three priests in the province, the Rev. Roderick Macdonell at St. Andrews (St. Andrew's West, Ontario) and St. Regis (St. Regis, Quebec), the Rev. Francis Fitzimmons in Glengarry, and the Rev. Father Richard at Sandwich. The Rev. Roderick Macdonell died in 1806 and Father Fitzimmons removed shortly afterwards to New Brunswick; this left Father Macdonell in charge of the whole province for the next ten years with limited assistance.

He was obliged to travel over through the province, carrying the requisites for Mass, and the administration of the sacraments, sometimes on horseback, sometimes in birch canoes, and sometimes on foot. In 1812, he raised another regiment, the Glengarry Light Infantry Fencibles, which came to the defence of Upper Canada in the War of 1812. William Foster Coffin would later liken McDonell to "a medieval churchman, half bishop, half baron, [who] fought and prayed, with equal zeal, by the side of men he had come to regard as his hereditary followers".

St. Raphael's Catholic Church was built around 1821. It was one of the oldest churches in what was then Upper Canada. In late 1970, the church interiors, roof and tower were destroyed by fire. In 1973, a smaller church with the same name was built, attached to the ruins.

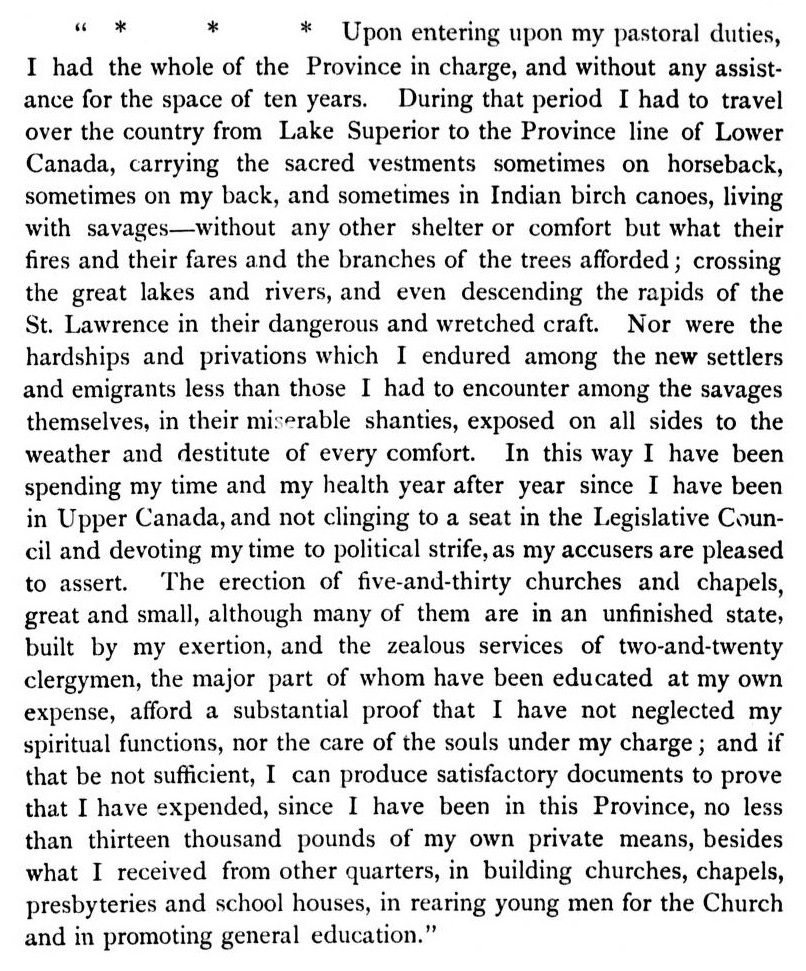
Bishop Alexander Macdonell - Letter to Lieutenant Governor Francis Bond Head (1836)

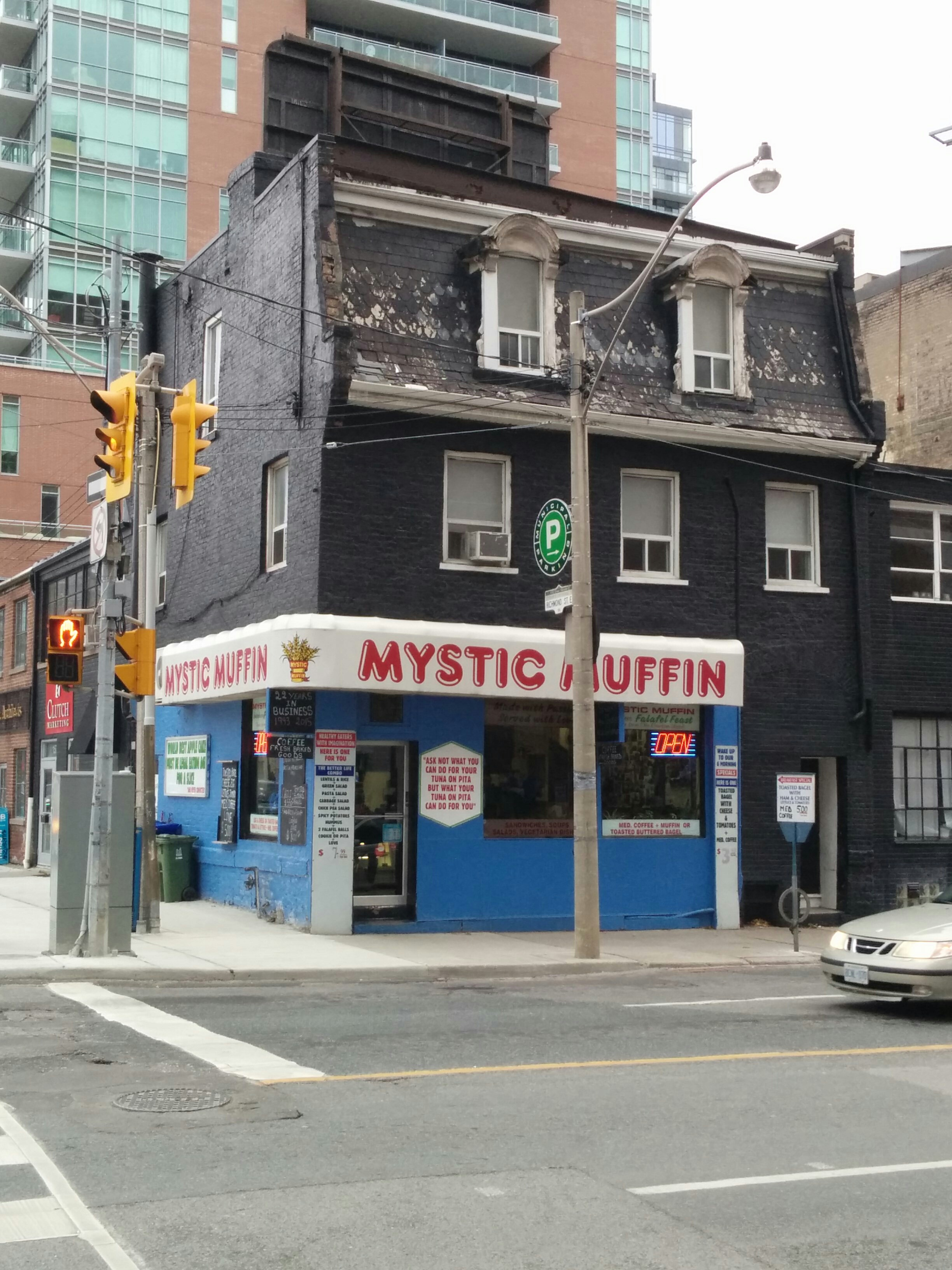
Macdonell's house in Toronto

== Bishop ==
In 1817 Upper Canada was set apart from the See of Quebec as a vicariate Apostolic, and two years later Father Macdonell was appointed vicar Apostolic, his consecration as Bishop of Rhosina taking place in the Ursuline chapel, Quebec, on 31 December 1820. A significant incident was the gift to Bishop Macdonell of a magnificent episcopal ring by King George IV. Six years later, 14 February 1826, the vicariate was raised to a bishopric by Pope Leo XII, and Bishop Macdonell then became the first Bishop of Upper Canada with his see at Kingston.

Bishop Macdonell's thorough knowledge of the country and its people and his great administrative ability made his counsel desirable to the government, and on 12 October 1831, he was called to the Legislative Council of Upper Canada, and thereafter was accorded the title "Honourable".

He founded churches and schools and in 1839 established Regiopolis College, which offered academic and theological training to Roman Catholic youth. The original building has been part of the Hotel Dieu Hospital (Kingston, Ontario) on Sydenham Street, Kingston, Ontario since 1892.

== Death ==
Bishop Macdonell died from pneumonia on 14 January 1840, aged 77 in Dumfries, Scotland, where he had gone with the hope of interesting Irish and Scottish bishops in a plan of emigration and to raise funds for the college. He was buried in the crypt of St. Margaret's Convent chapel, Edinburgh, but his remains were subsequently removed to Canada and interred in Kingston Cathedral 26 September 1861.

== Legacies ==
There is a tablet to his memory in St. Raphael's, Alexandria, erected 18 June 1843, by the Highland Society of Canada, which Macdonell had founded.

The town of Alexandria in North Glengarry, Ontario is named after him.

In Guelph, Ontario, Canada, a Catholic secondary school was renamed to Bishop Macdonell Catholic High School in 1962 and Macdonell Street at the foot of Church of Our Lady Immaculate is named in his honour.

Macdonell Street in Kingston, Ontario is named after him.

When MacDonell resided in Toronto after returning from Europe he resided in a house on the south-east corner of Nelson (today's Jarvis) and Duchess (today's Richmond) Streets. The house, built in 1832, still stands, although it has been remade into a restaurant. It is a designated heritage building.

== See also ==
- Roman Catholic Archdiocese of Kingston
