= John Angus McMillan =

Canadian politician (1874 – 1922)

Member of Parliament for Glengarry
- In office 1908–1917
- Preceded by: Jacob Thomas Schell
- Succeeded by: Archibald John Macdonald

Ontario MPP
- In office 1905–1908
- Preceded by: William Duncan McLeod
- Succeeded by: Donald Robert McDonald
- Constituency: Glengarry

Personal details
- Born: 11 June 1874 Alexandria, Ontario, Canada
- Died: 23 December 1922 (aged 48)
- Party: Liberal
- Spouse: Flora McDonald (m. 1906)
- Occupation: Merchant

John Angus McMillan (11 June 1874 – 23 December 1922) was an Ontario merchant and political figure. He represented Glengarry in the Legislative Assembly of Ontario from 1905 to 1908 and in the House of Commons of Canada from 1908 to 1917 as a Liberal member.

He was born in Alexandria, Ontario, the son of Duncan McMillan, and grew up there. McMillan served on the town council for Alexandria. He was an agent for a furniture and appliance manufacturer. In 1906, he married Flora McDonald.
