= Osie Villeneuve =

Canadian politician (1906–1983)

Ontario MPP
- In office 1975–1983
- Preceded by: New riding
- Succeeded by: Noble Villeneuve
- Constituency: Stormont—Dundas and Glengarry
- In office 1963–1975
- Preceded by: Fernand Guindon
- Succeeded by: Riding abolished
- In office 1948–1957
- Preceded by: Edmund MacGillivray
- Succeeded by: Fernand Guindon
- Constituency: Glengarry

Member of Parliament for Glengarry—Prescott
- In office 1957–1962
- Preceded by: Raymond Bruneau
- Succeeded by: Viateur Éthier

Personal details
- Born: June 28, 1906 Maxville, Ontario
- Died: September 25, 1983 (aged 77) Ottawa, Ontario
- Party: Ontario Progressive Conservative Party; Progressive Conservative Party of Canada
- Spouse: Alma MacLeod
- Children: 3
- Occupation: Livestock broker

Osias F. "Osie" Villeneuve (June 28, 1906 – September 25, 1983) was a longtime politician in Ontario, Canada. He served in the Legislative Assembly of Ontario and the House of Commons of Canada, and was an elected representative almost continuously from the 1940s until his death.

== Background ==
Villeneuve was born on June 28, 1906, in Maxville, Ontario, and educated in the area. In his early days he worked as a livestock dealer. He married Alma MacLeod in 1930, and together they raised three sons. He played and coached minor league hockey in the 1930s and 1940s, including coaching and managing the Maxville Millionaires for which in part he was inducted into the Glengarry Sports Hall of Fame in 1995. Villeneuve also spearheaded many local projects, including the Jubilee Rink, the village's first covered rink, and forty years later the Maxville and District Sports Complex to replace the Jubilee. In recognition of this, the arena in the new complex was named in his honour. Villeneuve was also a founding member of the organizing committee for the first Glengarry Highland Games in 1948.

== Politics ==
Villeneuve served on the local school board on council, and was reeve of Maxville in 1948.

In the 1945 provincial election, he ran for the Progressive Conservative Party, and lost to Liberal incumbent Edmund MacGillivray by 1,613 votes in Glengarry. After winning the reeveship of Maxville in 1948, he ran again in the 1948 provincial election, and defeated MacGillivray by 1,788 votes. Villeneuve served as a government backbench supporter under Thomas Laird Kennedy and Leslie Frost, and won re-election in the Progressive Conservative landslides of 1951 and 1955.

Villeneuve resigned from the provincial legislature in May 1957 to run federally, as a candidate of the Progressive Conservative Party of Canada. He was successful, defeating Liberal incumbent Raymond Bruneau by 1,580 votes in Glengarry—Prescott in the 1957 election. He served as a backbench supporter of John Diefenbaker's minority government for a year, and defeated Bruneau a second time in the Progressive Conservative landslide of 1958.

He was defeated in the 1962 election, losing to Liberal Viateur Éthier by 2,857 votes. Villeneuve then returned to the Ontario legislature in the 1963 election, winning his old seat of Glengarry by 1,363 votes over a Liberal challenger. He was re-elected in 1967, 1971, 1975, 1977 and 1981, and served as a backbencher in the John Robarts and William Davis governments. He was never appointed to cabinet at either the federal or provincial levels.

Villeneuve suffered a heart attack in September 1983 while attending a reunion of former Progressive Conservative MPPs, and died in hospital a few hours later. His seat in the Ontario legislature was subsequently won by Noble Villeneuve, a distant relative.
