= Noble Villeneuve =

Canadian politician (1938–2018)

Member of the Ontario Provincial Parliament
- In office 1983–1999
- Preceded by: Osie Villeneuve
- Succeeded by: Riding abolished (Note: Stormont—Dundas—Glengarry was abolished in 1995. Villeneuve was the only member for Stormont—Dundas—Glengarry and East Grenville which was abolished in 1999.)
- Constituency: Stormont—Dundas—Glengarry; Stormont—Dundas—Glengarry and East Grenville (1995-1999)

Personal details
- Born: August 1, 1938 Cornwall, Ontario
- Died: February 28, 2018 (aged 79) Alexandria, Ontario
- Party: Progressive Conservative
- Relations: Osie Villeneuve (cousin)
- Children: 1
- Occupation: Farmer

Noble Alfred Villeneuve (August 1, 1938 – February 28, 2018) was a politician in Ontario, Canada. He was a Progressive Conservative member of the Legislative Assembly of Ontario from 1983 to 1999, and served as a cabinet minister in the governments of Frank Miller and Mike Harris.

== Background ==
Noble Villeneuve was a strong advocate for farmers across Ontario. Villeneuve was a beef and cash crop farmer on Dyer Road in Maxville, Ontario, as well as a farm real estate appraiser. He served as First Vice-President of the Ontario Society of Farm Managers and Rural Appraisers. Villeneuve's daughter, Roxane Villeneuve, was the Progressive Conservative Party candidate for Glengarry-Prescott-Russell in the 2014 provincial election, second place against the incumbent Grant Crack.

== Politics ==
Villeneuve was elected to the Ontario legislature in a by-election held on December 15, 1983, called after the death of Osie Villeneuve no relation. Running in the riding of Stormont—Dundas—Glengarry, he defeated Liberal candidate Johnny Whitteker by more than 4,000 votes. He was re-elected by about the same margin in the 1985 provincial election. He endorsed Dennis Timbrell for the party leadership in 1985.

The Progressive Conservative government of Frank Miller was re-elected in the 1985 election, but was reduced to minority status. Villeneuve was appointed to cabinet as a minister without portfolio on May 17, 1985. The PC government was short-lived and was defeated in the house a month later. For the party's November 1985 leadership convention, he shifted his support from Timbrell to Larry Grossman. In the 1987 election, Villeneuve defeated his Liberal opponent by only 607 votes. He was re-elected by a greater margin in the 1990 election, and won a landslide victory in the 1995 election as his party returned to power with a majority government.

Villeneuve was appointed Minister of Agriculture, Food and Rural Affairs with responsibility for Francophone Affairs on June 26, 1995. He held these positions until the 1999 election. Villeneuve was not regarded as one of the more right-wing figures in the Harris cabinet, though his government presided over considerable funding cutbacks in the agriculture department and the elimination of local representatives. However, Villeneuve made his mark during the 1998 Eastern Ontario Ice Storm where he provided farmers with funding to purchase necessary generators to keep their farms afloat and most importantly, to enable farmers to continue milking their cows during the lengthy power outage. His efforts as Minister of Agriculture, Food and Rural Affairs didn't go unnoticed. The ministry became one of the top ministries under his reign as Minister.

In 1996, the Harris government reduced the number of provincial ridings from 130 to 103. This change meant that a number of sitting Members of Provincial Parliament had to compete against one another for re-election. Villeneuve faced incumbent Liberal John Cleary in the new riding of Stormont—Dundas—Charlottenburgh, and lost by only 562 votes in a closely watched contest.

=== Cabinet positions ===
Harris ministry, Province of Ontario (1995–2002)
Cabinet post (1)
| Predecessor | Office | Successor |
|---|---|---|
| Elmer Buchanan | Minister of Agriculture and Food; 1995-1999; Also responsible for Francophone Affairs | Ernie Hardeman |

== After politics ==
In 2000, Villeneuve was appointed a Justice of the Peace. However he suffered a non-fatal but severe stroke in 2002. He resided at home with his wife Elaine as his caregiver for approximately 16yrs, then moved to the Maxville Manor where he resided for 2yrs prior to his death on Feb. 28, 2018.
