= Lancaster, Ontario =

Unincorporated community in South Glengarry, Ontario, Canada

Lancaster
- Unincorporated community Designated place
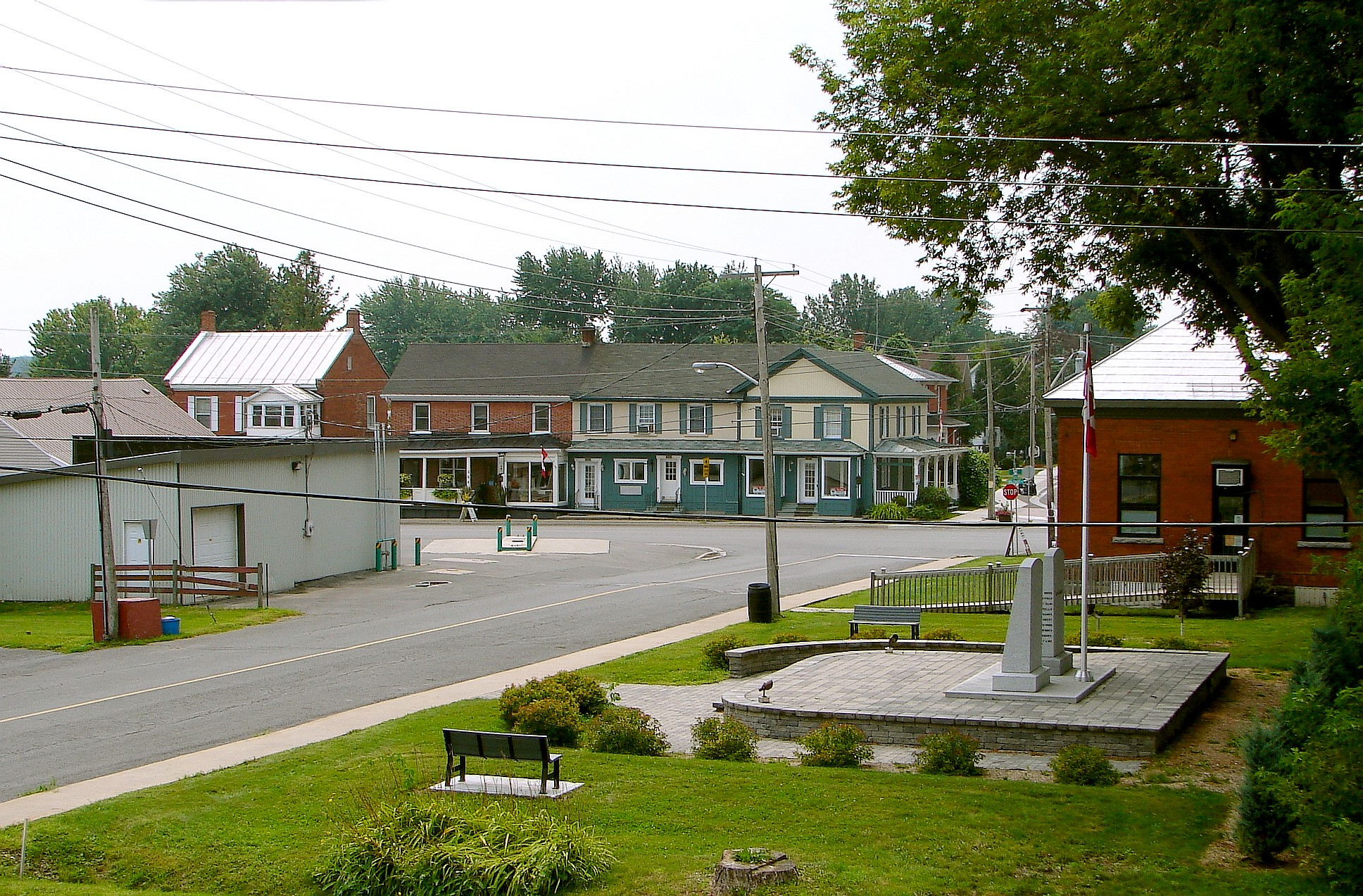

- Location within Southern Ontario
- Coordinates: 45°08′36″N 74°30′07″W
- Country: Canada
- Province: Ontario
- County: Stormont, Dundas and Glengarry
- Municipality: South Glengarry
- Dissolved (amalgamated): January 1, 1998

Government
  - Fed. riding: Stormont—Dundas—Glengarry
  - Prov. riding: Stormont—Dundas—South Glengarry

Area
  - Land: 0.72 km^{2} (0.28 sq mi)

Population (2021)
  - Total: 729
  - Density: 1,007.6/km^{2} (2,610/sq mi)
- Time zone: UTC-5 (EST)
  - Summer (DST): UTC-4 (EDT)
- Postal code: K0C 1N0
- Area codes: 613

Lancaster is an unincorporated community in South Glengarry, Ontario, Canada, located near the St. Lawrence River. It is recognized as a designated place by Statistics Canada.

On January 1, 1998, the Village of Lancaster, together with the Townships of Lancaster and Charlottenburgh, was amalgamated into the new Township of South Glengarry.

== Demographics ==
In the 2021 Census of Population conducted by Statistics Canada, Lancaster had a population of 729 living in 320 of its 342 total private dwellings, a change of −2.8% from its 2016 population of 750. With a land area of 0.72 km^{2} (0.28 sq mi), it had a population density of 1,012.5/km^{2} (2,622.4/sq mi) in 2021.

Historical census populations – Lancaster (Population centre)

Year	Pop.	±%
1891	700	—
1901	583	−16.7%
1911	624	+7.0%
1921	672	+7.7%
1931	616	−8.3%
1941	684	+11.0%
1951	548	−19.9%

Year	Pop.	±%
1956	594	+8.4%
1961	584	−1.7%
1966	599	+2.6%
1971	617	+3.0%
1976	540	−12.5%
1981	637	+18.0%
1986	731	+14.8%

Year	Pop.	±%
1991	739	+1.1%
1996	825	+11.6%
2001	797	−3.4%
2006	673	−15.6%
2011	730	+8.5%
2016	750	+2.7%
2021	729	−2.8%

Population counts prior to 1998 are for Lancaster Village.
Source: Statistics Canada

== See also ==
- List of communities in Ontario
- List of designated places in Ontario
