= Glengarry County =

Coordinates: 45°15′N 74°35′W

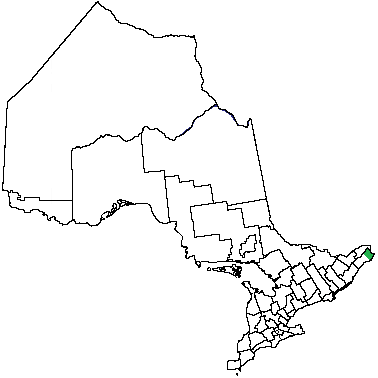
- Glengarry located within Ontario
- Country: Canada
- Province: Ontario
- Established: 1784

Glengarry County, an area covering 288,688 acres (1,168 km^{2}), is a county in the province of Ontario, Canada. It is inhabited by the descendants of 18th and early 19th-century Scottish Highland pioneer settlers from Lochaber, was historically a Gàidhealtachd community, and Canadian Gaelic language revival efforts are currently taking place there. Glengarry County consists of the townships of North Glengarry and South Glengarry. It borders the Saint Lawrence River to the south, the county of Stormont and City of Cornwall to the west, the province of Quebec to the east, and the United Counties of Prescott-Russell to the north.

== History ==
Glengarry was founded in 1784 by Gaelic-speaking United Empire Loyalists, mainly from Clan Donald, whose defeat in the American Revolution had caused them to become refugees from the Mohawk Valley in upstate New York, North Carolina, and, despite the fact that most Scottish Gaels in that Colony chose to be Patriots, from Georgia. His Majesty's Government, as represented by the Governor General of British North America, Guy Carleton, 1st Baron Dorchester, hoped the new migrants would help settle and develop the area, which first became known as Upper Canada and later as Ontario. The Crown accordingly issued land grants and helped with supplies during the first winter, in lieu of financial compensation for their confiscated properties in United States.

Other veterans of the British armed forces during later wars received land instead of pay for their salaries, particularly the Glengarry Fencibles, a Scottish regiment organized by Roman Catholic military chaplain Alexander Macdonnell, who followed the regiment's soldiers and their families to the county and later became the first Roman Catholic Bishop of Kingston. The county was named after Clan MacDonald of Glengarry, where Bishop MacDonell and many of the soldiers of the regiment had also come from.

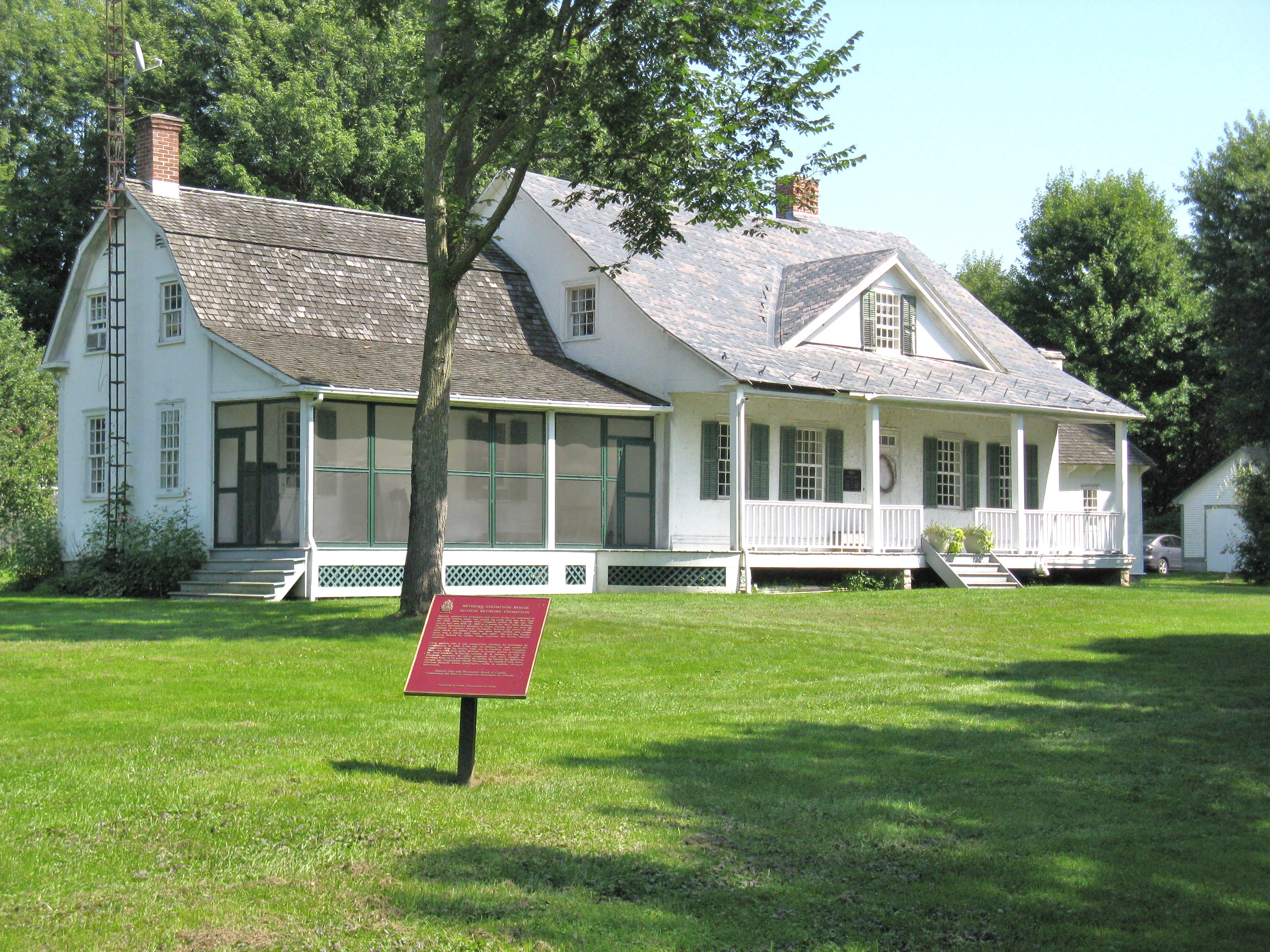
Rev. John Bethune House, South Glengarry.

The Presbyterian Gaels of the settlement, on the other hand, were looked after in early years, by Loyalist refugee Rev. John Bethune, formerly the minister of the Gaelic-speaking Barbeque Presbyterian Church in Harnett County, North Carolina. Even so, the unlikely friendship between the Presbyterian minister and the Catholic Bishop remains legendary today.

Following an 1814 visit to the settlement, Dr. D. MacPherson wrote, "You might travel over the whole of the County and by far the greater part of Stormont, without hearing anything spoken except the good Gaelic. Every family, even of the lowest order, has a landed property of 200 acres... However poor the family (but indeed there are none that can be called so) they kill a bullock for the winter consumption; the farm or estate supplies them with abundance of butter, cheese, etc., etc. Their houses are small but comfortable, having a ground floor and garret, with regular chimney and glass windows. The appearance of the people is at all times respectable, but I was delighted at seeing them at church on a Sunday; the men clothed in good English cloth, and many of the women wore the Highland plaid."

Understandingly, this prosperity in contrast with the escalation of widespread poverty in the Highlands and Islands caused by rackrenting landlords, the Highland Clearances, and the Highland Potato Famine, meant that Glengarry County long remained a magnet for new immigration from the Gàidhealtachd. The distinctive Canadian Gaelic dialect once spoken pervasively throughout the County has also contributed much to both Scottish Gaelic literature and Scottish traditional music. For example, poet Anna NicGillìosa (1759-1847) emigrated from Morar to Upper Canada in 1786 and eventually settled in South Glengarry, and a Gaelic song-poem in praise of her new home there survives. Following her death there in 1847, NicGillìosa was buried beside the (now ruined) St Raphael's Roman Catholic Church.

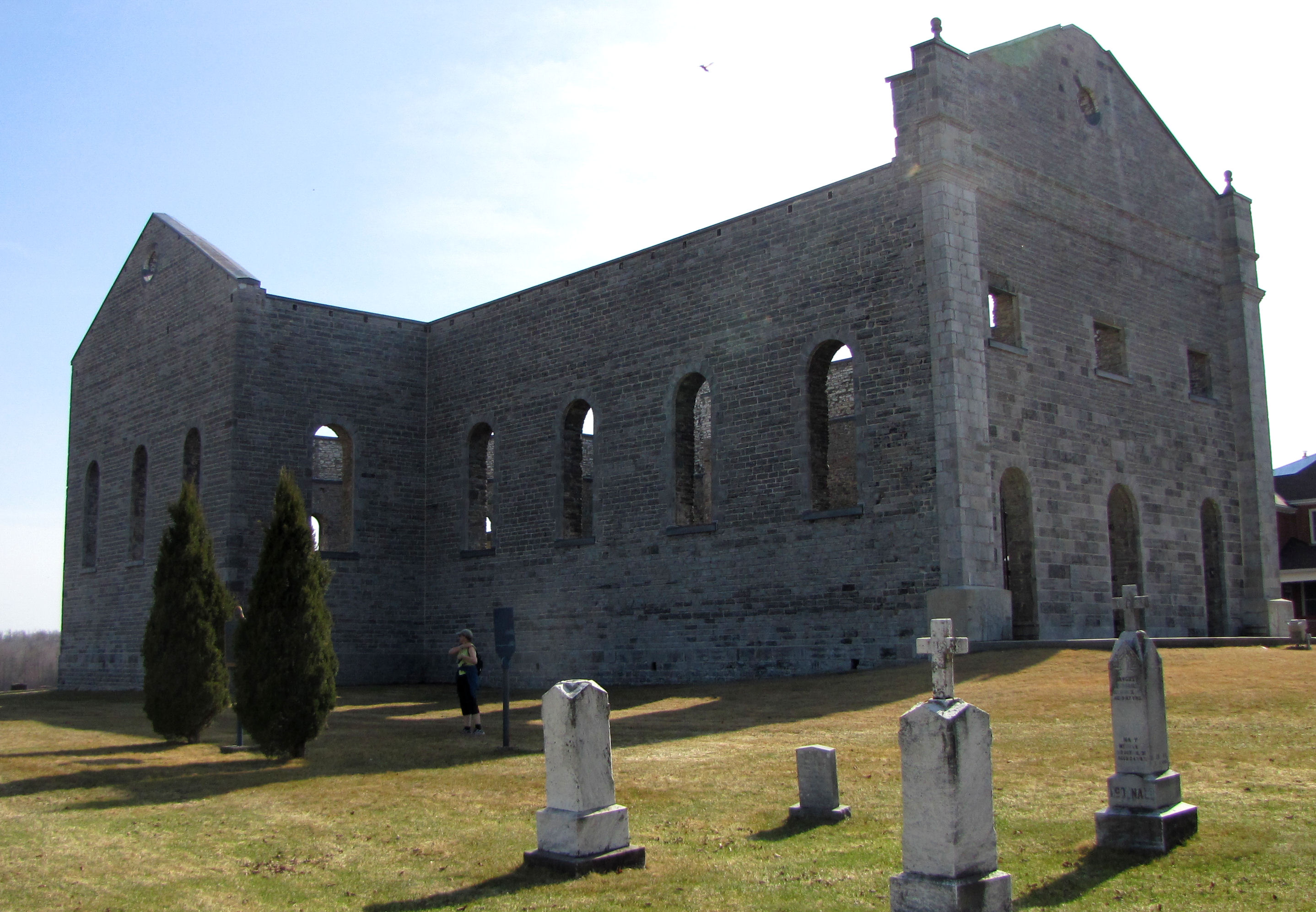
Ruins of St. Raphael Church, South Glengarry

One visitor during early settlement later recalled, "Anyone who ever saw the reaping bees by moonlight was likely never to forget it; a singer would come, sickle in hand, follow the bent form of the racing reapers (women and men) leading the solo part of a song which they, or their forbears, had learned in the Highlands, while the workers kept up time with great glee and good time... Although the young men did not handle the needle at quilting bees, they generally put in an appearance in the evening when the girls had accomplished that feat, but at fulling bees both sexes participated and the fulling could not be properly carried on without the songs to regulate the time for the beating of the cloth with hands and feet."

Over time, however, railway expansion into the region, economic downturns, and the Anglicisation policy in the Canadian school system took their toll. It also did not help that, similarly to Gaelic-speaking politicians in other parts of Canada, political leaders from Glengarry tended to side with pro-English language policies and routinely chose to deliberately antagonise French Canadian language activists, rather than joining forces to fight for their mutual linguistic rights. Furthermore, soldiers from Glengarry County were deployed against the Upper Canada rebellion of 1837 and the Patriot War of 1838, which resulted in a letter of thanks from the Governor General.

In 1879, a visitor from Scotland enthusiastically declared that the Glengarry dialect of Scottish Gaelic was better preserved, "with the most perfect accent, and with scarcely any, if any, admixture of English", in Glengarry County and in Cornwall, Ontario than in Lochaber itself.

In 1884, however, one Glengarry writer lamented, "During the lifetime of the first immigrants the Gaelic language was much in use, so much so that knowledge of it was considered a necessary qualification for the Presbyterian pulpit. The common school, however, has brought the new generation to use the English tongue, and a Gaelic sermon is seldom heard, though in some isolated areas is in some measure of use."

By the same decade, Glengarry County had also become a major center for outward migration, especially to the United States, "In proportion to size of territory and population, the district has sent more lumbermen to Michigan forests, more settlers to Minnesota prairies, more hands to assist and direct the construction of railways, than any other on the American continent... effective reference may be made to the settlement in Dakota, where a new Glengarry is springing up."

The Glengarry Highland Games were first celebrated in 1948. They have been held annually since, during the weekend before the first Monday in August. These Games are one of the largest of their kind outside Scotland, attracting visitors from all over the world. The original territory of Glengarry also included Prescott County, which became a separate county in 1800.

Glengarry united with Stormont and Dundas in 1850 to form the United Counties of Stormont, Dundas and Glengarry.

Canadian Gaelic (i.e. Canadian Scottish Gaelic) used to be the main community language spoken throughout the region. Though the number of speakers has steadily decreased over time and the last "fluent" speaker of the Glengarry County Gaelic dialect died in 2001, those working towards a local Gaelic language revival have formed classes for heritage language learning throughout Glengarry.

== Historic townships ==
Glengarry was originally divided east and west into Charlottenburgh and Lancaster townships, and then eventually divided into four townships. It has since been divided into North and South Glengarry.

- Charlottenburgh – now in South Glengarry Township, it was named in honour of Queen Charlotte.
- Kenyon – now in North Glengarry Township. Kenyon Township was taken from Charlottenburg Township in 1798, and was named from the English Chief Justice Lloyd Kenyon, 1st Baron Kenyon
- Lancaster – now in South Glengarry Township. Surveyed in 1784, it was first settled in 1785.
- Lochiel – now in North Glengarry. Lochiel Township separated from Lancaster Township on November 24, 1818. Lochiel was named after the chief of the Clan Cameron. This clan had many representatives among the veteran settlers.

== See also ==
- List of Ontario census divisions
- List of townships in Ontario
- Canadian Gaelic
