= South Glengarry =

Township in Ontario, Canada

- Township (lower-tier)
- Township of South Glengarry
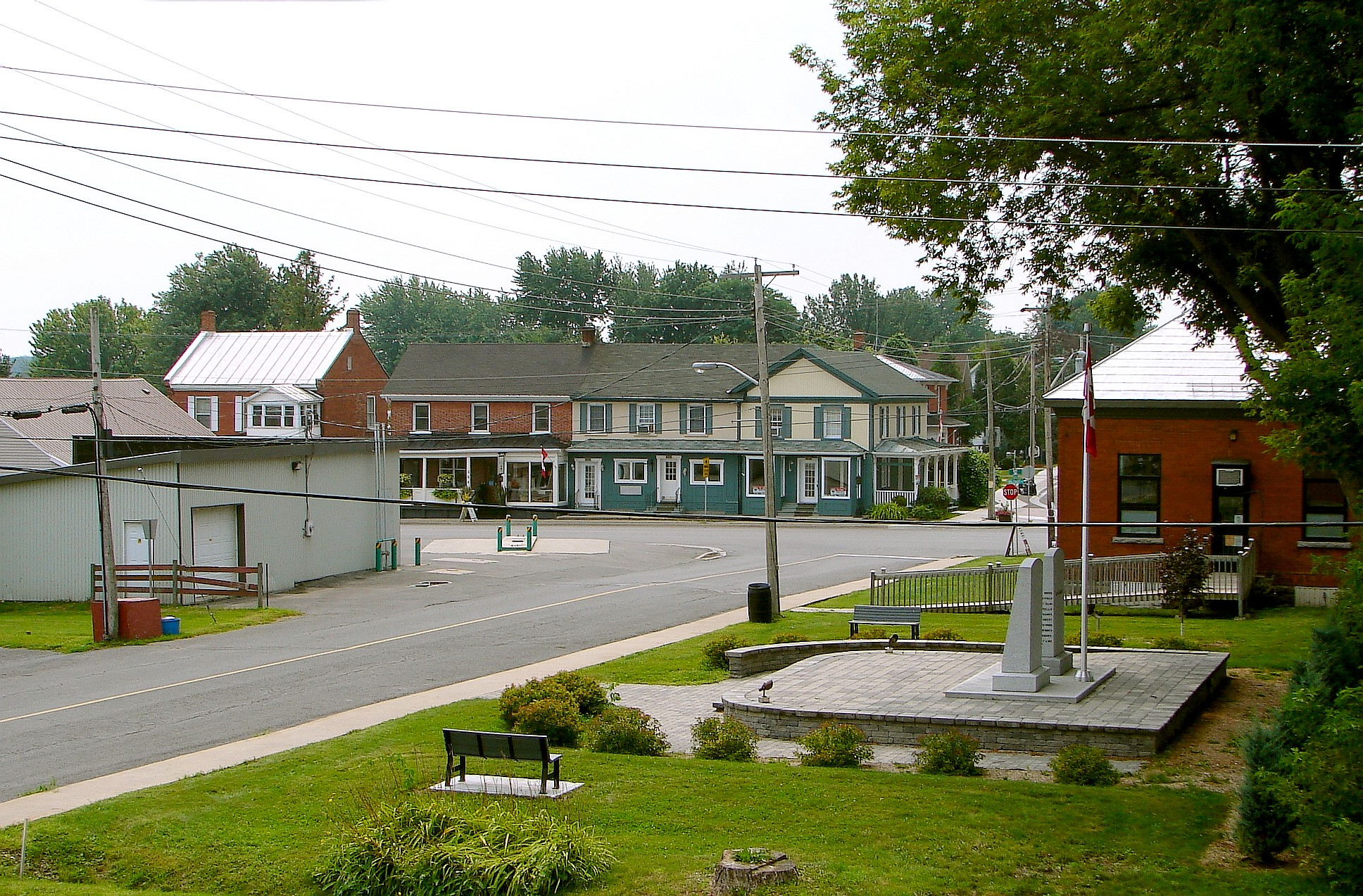
- Lancaster

- Location within United Counties of Stormont, Dundas and Glengarry Location within Southern Ontario
- Coordinates: 45°12′N 74°35′W
- Country: Canada
- Province: Ontario
- County: Stormont, Dundas and Glengarry
- Settled: 1785
- Incorporated: 1792 (Royal Townships)
- Incorporated: 1998 (South Glengarry)

Government
  - Type: Township
  - Mayor: Lachlan McDonald
  - Federal riding: Stormont—Dundas—Glengarry
  - Prov. riding: Stormont—Dundas—South Glengarry

Area
  - Land: 605.02 km^{2} (233.60 sq mi)

Population (2021)
  - Total: 13,330
  - Density: 22/km^{2} (57/sq mi)
- Time zone: UTC−5 (EST)
  - Summer (DST): UTC−4 (EDT)
- Postal code FSA: K0C
- Area codes: 613, 343
- Website: southglengarry.com

South Glengarry is a township in eastern Ontario, Canada on the Saint Lawrence River in the United Counties of Stormont, Dundas and Glengarry. South Glengarry borders Quebec.

== Communities ==
The township of South Glengarry comprises a number of villages and hamlets, including the following communities:

In the former Charlottenburgh Township:

- Glen Walter
- Green Valley
- Martintown
- Summerstown
- Summerstown Station
- St. Raphaels
- Williamstown
- Avondale
- Cashions Glen
- Glen Brook
- Glendale
- Glen Falloch
- Glenroy
- MacGillivrays Bridge
- Munroes Mills
- Tyotown
- Bayview Estates
- Sapphire hills
- Glendale Subdivision
- Glen Gordon
- Loon Island
- North Branch
- Camerons Point
- Danis Point
- Farlingers Point
- Flannigans Point
- Fraser Point
- McGibbons Point
- Pilons Point
- Prevost Point
- Stonehouse Point

In the former Lancaster Township:

- Bainsville
- Brown House Corner
- Dalhousie Mills
- Glen Nevis
- Glen Norman
- Lancaster
- North Lancaster
- South Lancaster
- Bridge End
- Curry Hill
- Pine Hill
- Lancaster Heights
- Maple Hill
- North Lancaster Station
- Picnic Grove
- Redwood Estates
- Brittania Point
- Creg Quay
- Faulkners Point
- Nadeaus Point
- Pointe Mouillee
- Westleys Point

The township administrative offices are located in Lancaster.

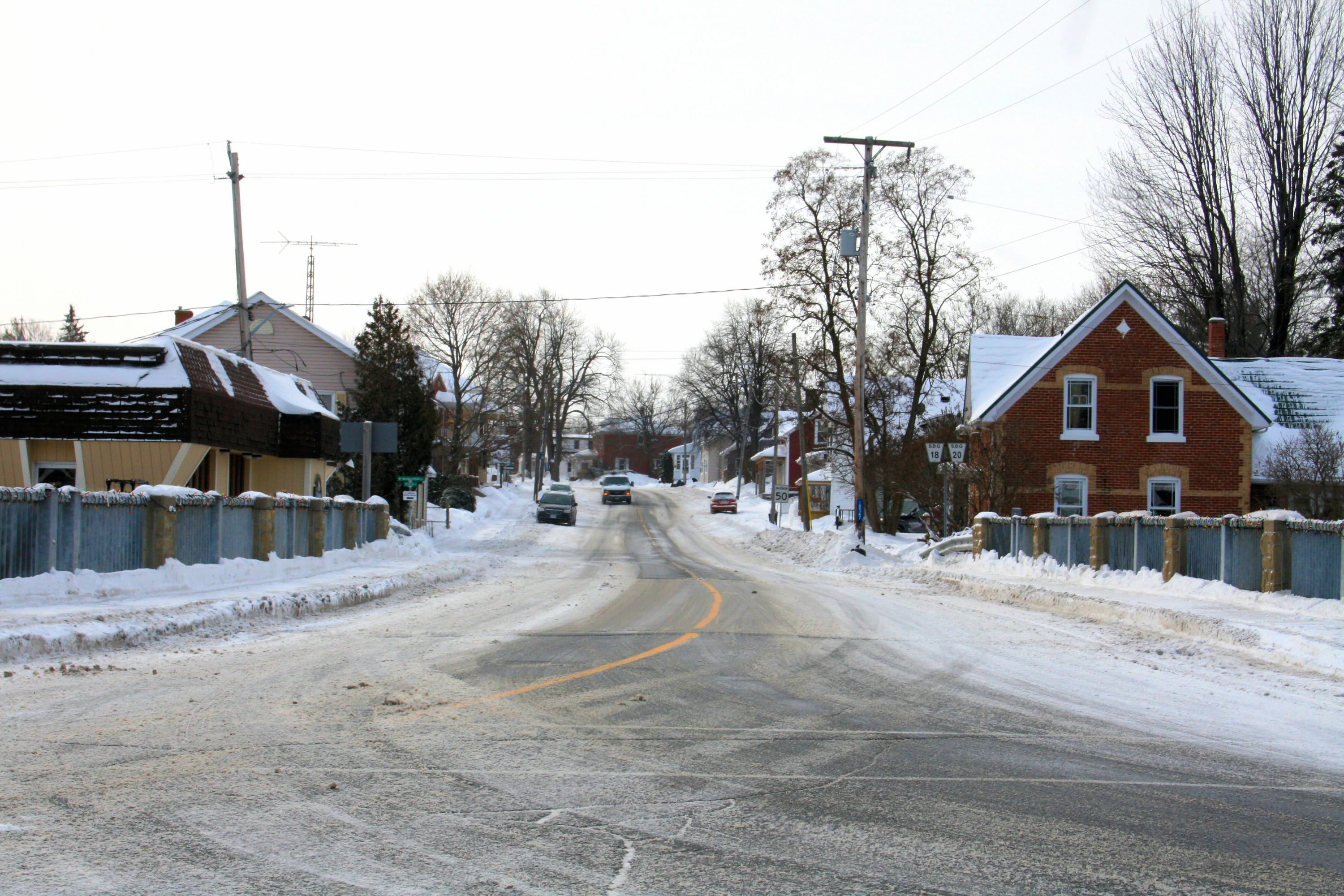
Martintown

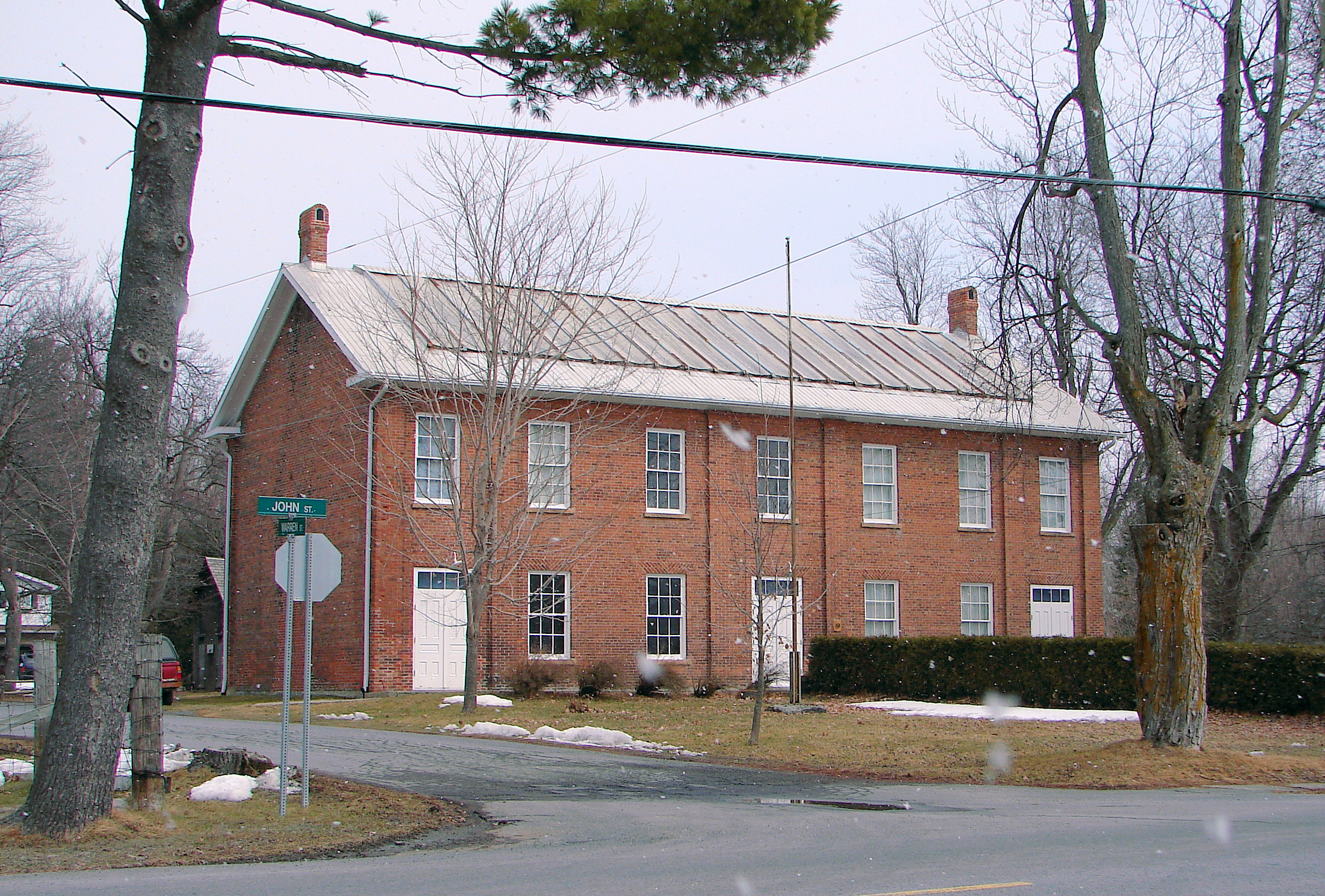
Williamstown

== History ==
Charlottenburgh and Lancaster were two of the original eight "Royal Townships", established along the Saint Lawrence River in Upper Canada in the 1780s. This area was first settled by United Empire Loyalists. The development of this area was encouraged by Sir John Johnson, then the Superintendent General and Inspector General of Indian Affairs, who had been forced to abandon his land holdings in New York State during the American Revolution. Johnson built a house in Williamstown; the home was completed in 1785 and is now a Canadian National Historic Site, the Sir John Johnson Manor House. A grist mill and saw mill, now gone, were also built on the same location. Williamstown also has the oldest house in Ontario, The Bethune-Thompson House built in 1784. Occupants over the years have included the Reverend John Bethune (1751–1815), the great-great-grandfather of Doctor Norman Bethune, and David Thompson, Canadian explorer.

From the late 18th century to the early 19th century, the area was almost entirely settled by Scottish highlanders, especially from Inverness-shire, after the Highland Clearances. Canadian Gaelic / Scottish Gaelic had been spoken in Glengarry County since its first settlement in 1784.

Some of the main partners of the North West Company, including Hugh McGillis, lived in this area.

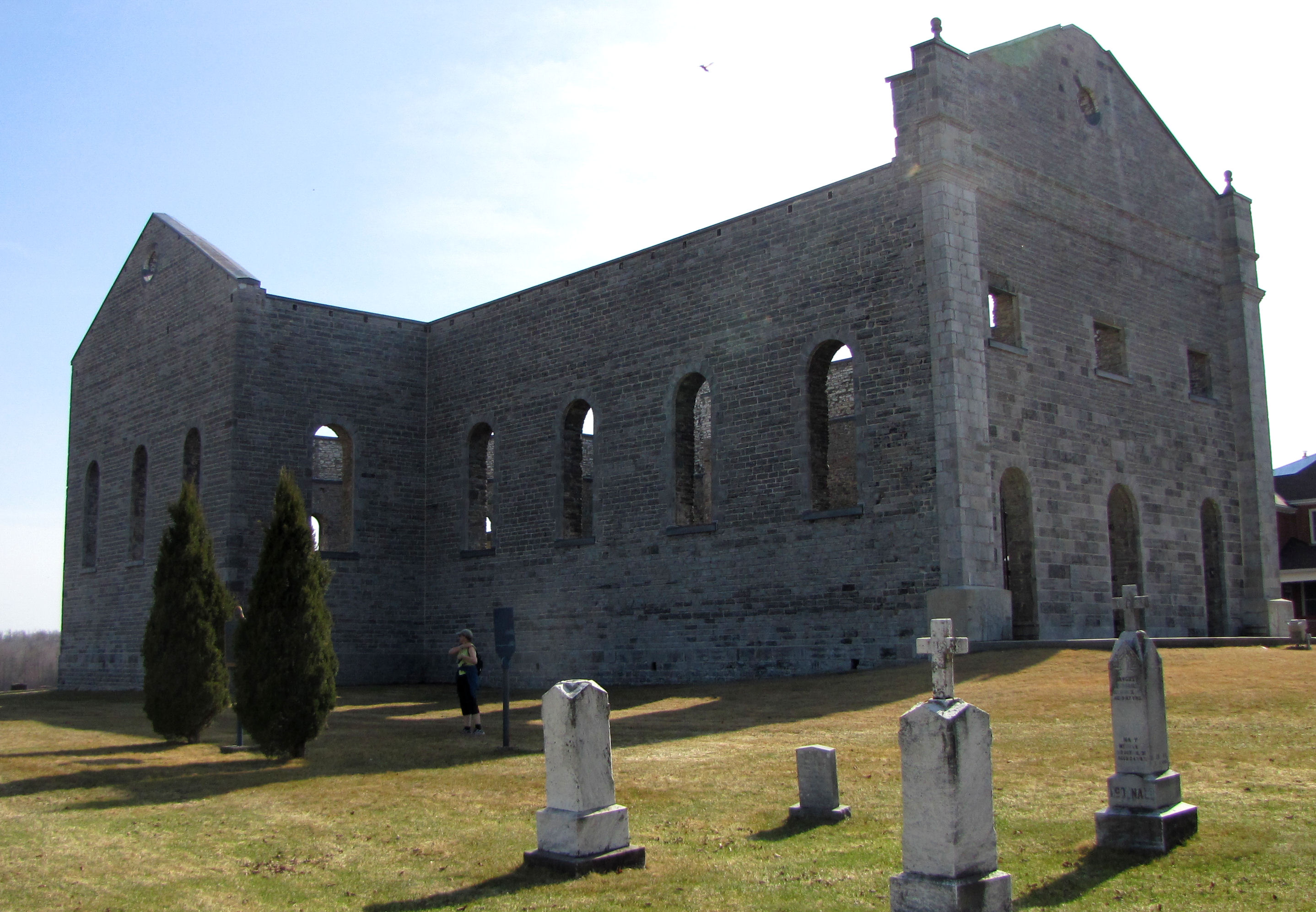
Ruins of St. Raphael's Church

Alexander McMartin, the first person born in Upper Canada to serve in the Legislative Assembly, was from Martintown.

The Glengarry Celtic Music Hall of Fame is located in Williamstown. The Nor'Westers and Loyalist Museum is also located in Williamstown.

Williamstown is also home to Ontario's oldest continuing agricultural fair, which celebrated its bicentennial in 2012.

South Glengarry is the location of four National Historic Sites of Canada: the Bethune-Thompson House, the Glengarry Cairn, the Sir John Johnson House, and the ruins of St. Raphael's Roman Catholic Church.

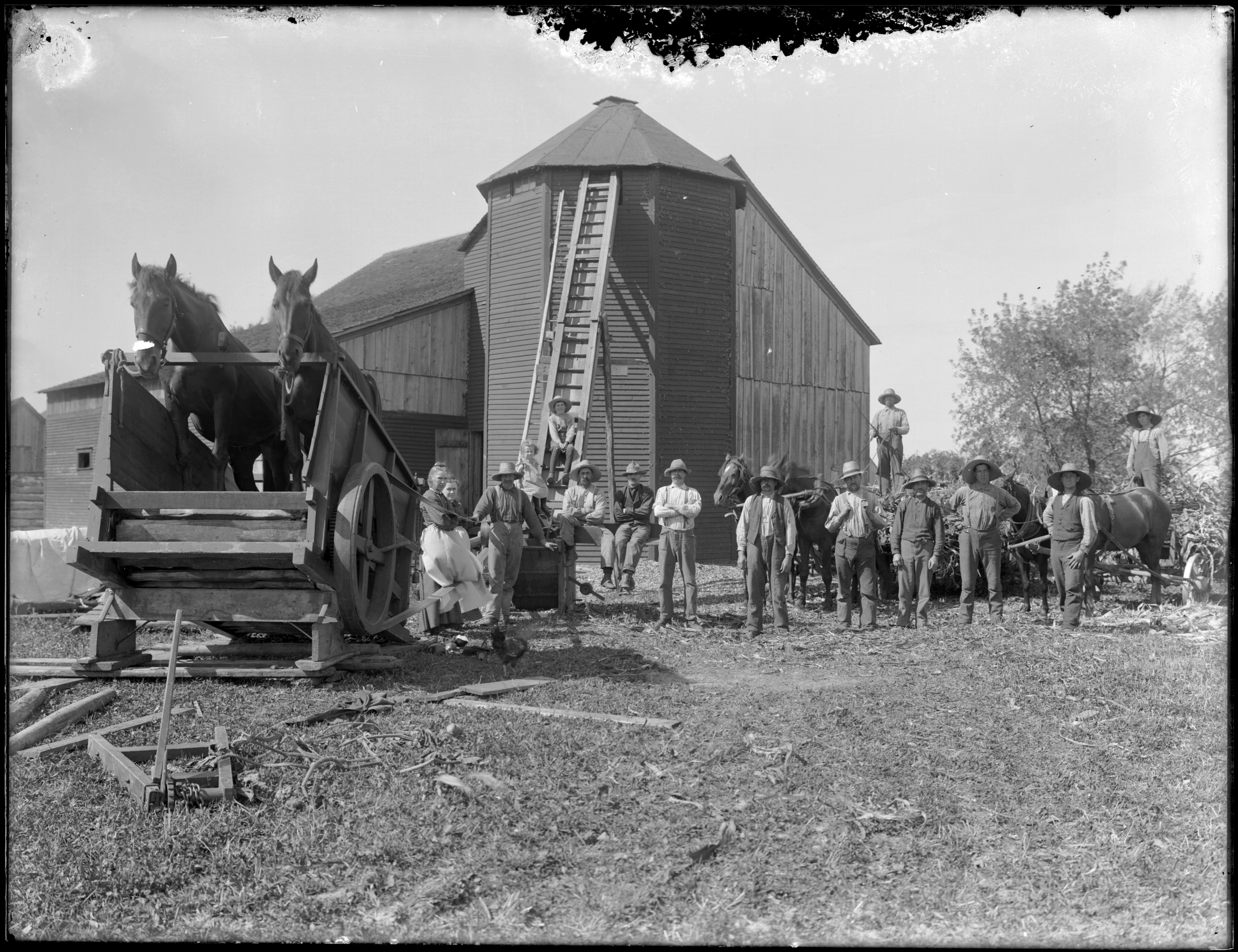
Operation of a horse-powered treadmill around the turn of the 20th century, Martintown.

St. Raphael's Catholic Church was completed in 1821 under the authority of Alexander Macdonell later Bishop of Regiopolis (now Kingston, Ontario). This is one of the oldest churches in what was then the colony of Upper Canada. In late 1970, the church interiors, roof and tower were destroyed by fire, but the ruins were preserved. In 1973, a smaller church with the same name was built, attached to the ruins.

The township was established on January 1, 1998, with the amalgamation of the former Townships of Charlottenburgh and Lancaster, along with the Village of Lancaster.

== Demographics ==
In the 2021 Census of Population conducted by Statistics Canada, South Glengarry had a population of 13,330 living in 5,431 of its 5,848 total private dwellings, a change of 1.4% from its 2016 population of 13,150. With a land area of 605.02 km^{2} (233.60 sq mi), it had a population density of 22.0/km^{2} (57.1/sq mi) in 2021.

Canada census – South Glengarry community profile

	2021	2016	2011
Population	13,330 (+1.4% from 2016)	13,150 (-0,1% from 2011)	13,162 (2.2% from 2006)
Land area	605.02 km^{2} (233.60 sq mi)	605.36 km^{2} (233.73 sq mi)	605.30 km^{2} (233.71 sq mi)
Population density	22.0/km^{2} (57/sq mi)	21.7/km^{2} (56/sq mi)	21.7/km^{2} (56/sq mi)
Median age	50.4 (M: 50.4, F: 50.8)	49.9 (M: 49.6, F: 50.1)	47.7 (M: 47.3, F: 48.1)
Private dwellings	5,848 (total) 5,431 (occupied)	5823 (total)	5616 (total)
Median household income	$91,000	$76,702

References: 2021 2016 2011

Historical census populations

Year	Pop.	±%
1986	10,946	—
1991	11,971	+9.4%
1996	12,649	+5.7%
2001	12,700	+0.4%

Year	Pop.	±%
2006	12,880	+1.4%
2011	13,162	+2.2%
2016	13,150	−0.1%
2021	13,330	+1.4%

Population amounts prior to 2001 is total of Charlottenburgh TP, Lancaster TP, and Lancaster VL.

== Culture ==
Canadian author Hugh Hood mentions Williamstown in his short story "Getting to Williamstown," first published in 1928.

== Sport ==
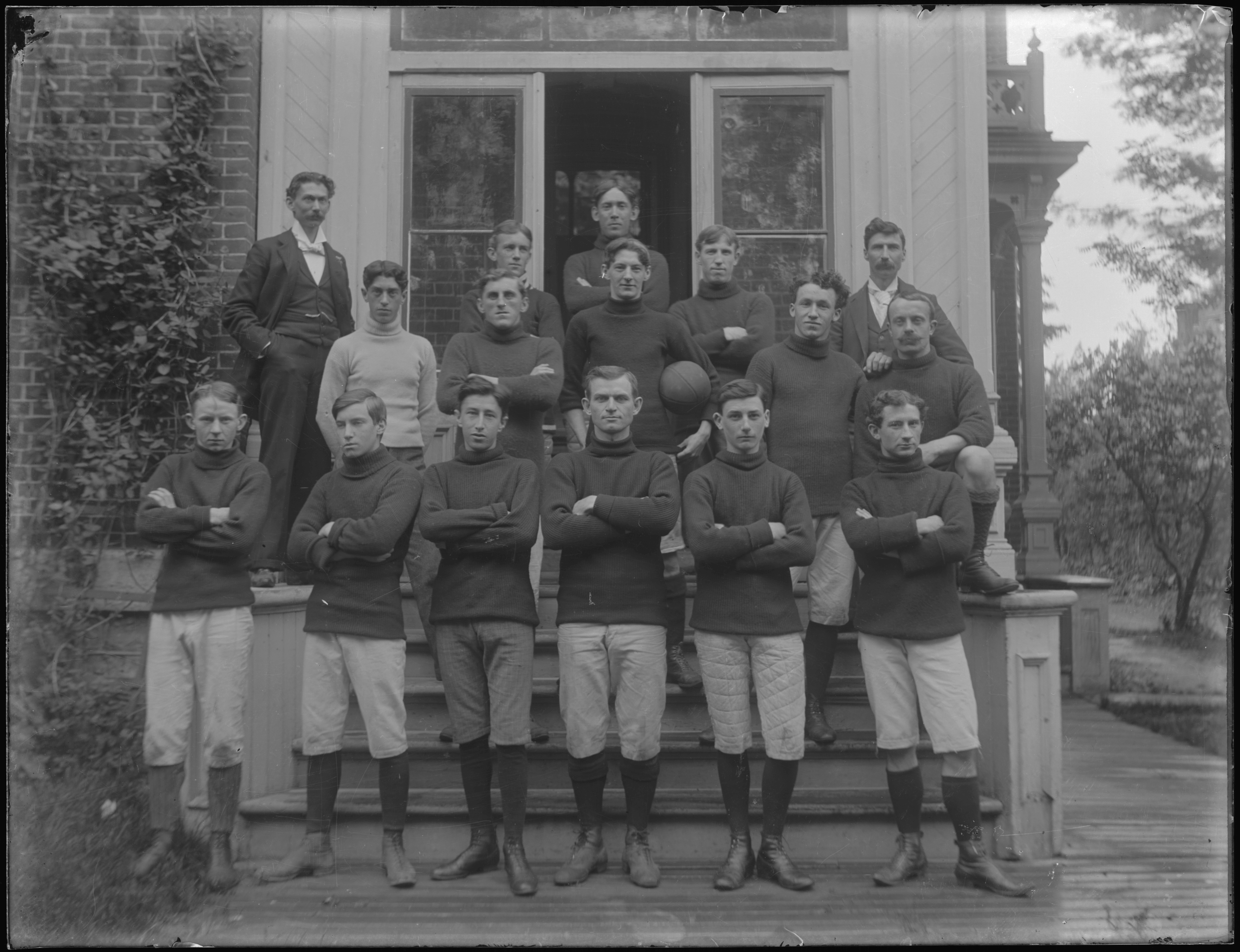
Group portrait of Martintown football team, 1903

The Char-Lan Rebels of the CCHL2 League play out of the Char-Lan Recreation Centre in Williamstown. The Char-Lan Skating Club is based out of the Char-Lan Recreation Centre.

== Notable people ==
- Sir John Johnson, one of the original landowners and developers of the area. Constructed The Manor House in Williamstown, now a Canadian National Historic Site.
- James Leroy (1947–1979), nationally recognized songwriter, performer and recording artist; spent his childhood and adolescence in Martintown.
- Alexander Macdonell, later Bishop of Regiolopolis (now Kingston, Ontario).
- Ran McDonald, hockey player, born in Cashion's Glen and played in the PCHA reaching the height of his career in the 1919 Stanley Cup Final.
- Alexander McMartin, from Martintown; first person born in Upper Canada to serve in the Legislative Assembly.
- David Thompson, resident of Williamstown; Canadian explorer.
- John Sandfield Macdonald; born in St. Raphael West, Glengarry County, Ontario which was then Upper Canada (joint premier of the Province of Canada and the first premier of Ontario).

== See also ==
- List of townships in Ontario
- List of francophone communities in Ontario
- Royal eponyms in Canada
