= Roderick R. McLennan =

Canadian politician

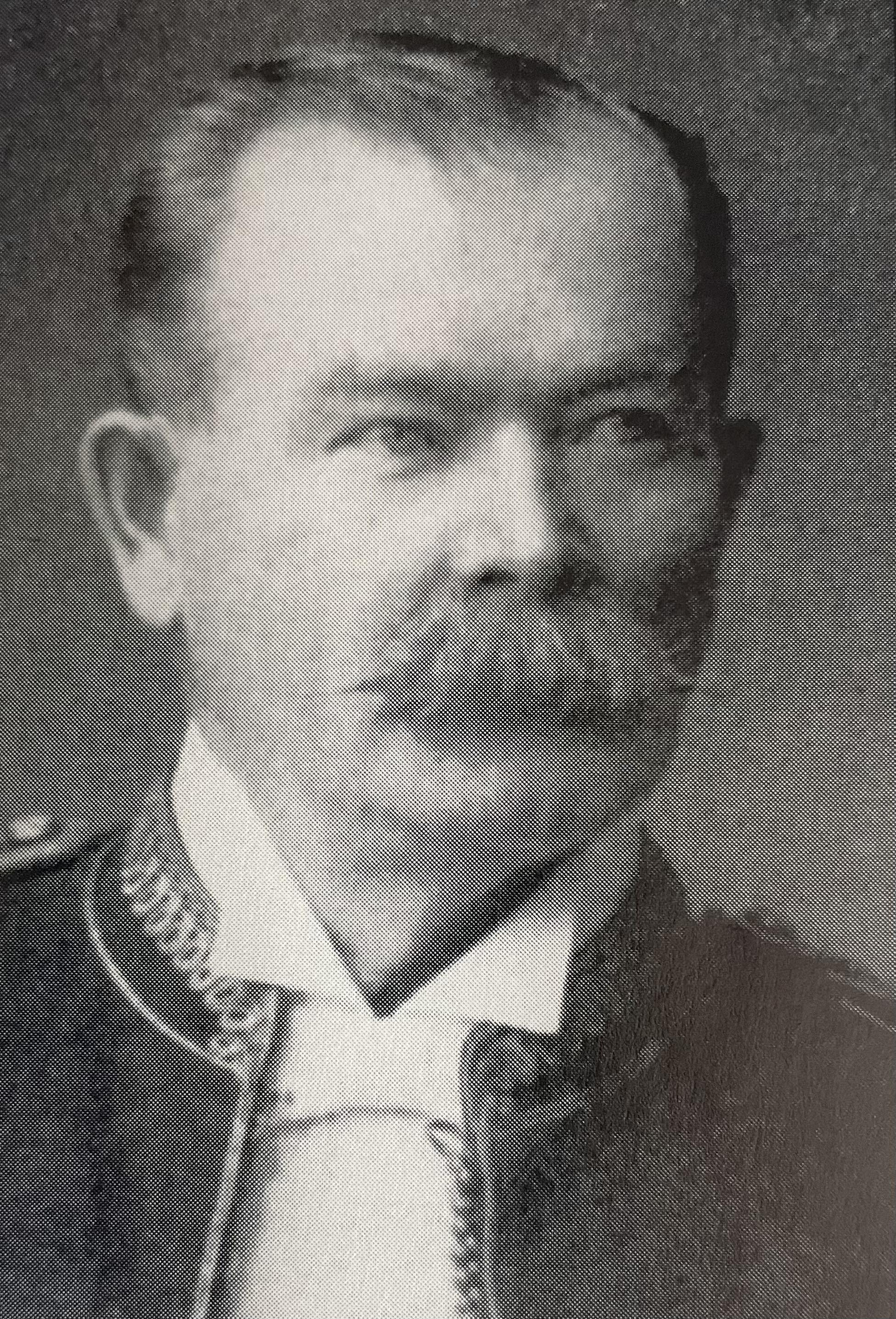

Member of the Canadian Parliament for Glengarry
- In office 1891–1900
- Preceded by: Patrick Purcell
- Succeeded by: Jacob Thomas Schell

Personal details
- Born: January 1, 1842 Charlottenburgh, Canada West
- Died: March 8, 1907 (aged 65)
- Party: Conservative

Military service
- Allegiance: Canada
- Branch/service: Canadian militia
- Years of service: 1885 - 1900
- Rank: Captain; Major; Colonel
- Unit: 59th Stormont and Glengarry Regiment (1885-1897)
- Commands: 59th Stormont and Glengarry Regiment (1897-1900)

Roderick R. McLennan (January 1, 1842 – March 8, 1907) was a Canadian politician.

Born in Charlottenburgh, Canada West, the third son of Roderick McLennan, McLennan worked in construction of railways and other public works, including sections of the Canadian Pacific Railway north of Lake Superior. He was a director of the Manufacturers' Life Insurance Company and was President of the Liberal-Conservative Association for Glengarry from 1885 to 1890.

His father served with the Glengarry Militia during the Rebellion of 1837-1838 and McLennan was active in the Canadian Militia himself, joining the 59th Stormont and Glengarry Regiment on July 24, 1885 and serving as Lieutenant-Colonel of the regiment from 1897 - February 21, 1900.

He was first elected to the House of Commons of Canada for the electoral district of Glengarry in the 1891 federal election. He was unseated in January 1892 and was acclaimed in the resulting by-election. He was re-elected in the 1896 federal election and was defeated in the 1900 election by Jacob Thomas Schell.
