= Archibald John Macdonald =

Canadian politician

Member of Parliament for Glengarry
- In office October 1925 – May 1930
- Preceded by: John Angus McMillan
- Succeeded by: Angus McGillis

Personal details
- Born: Archibald John Macdonald; 9 January 1876 Lancaster, Ontario, Canada
- Died: 11 January 1938 (aged 62)
- Party: Liberal
- Spouse(s): Bessie McDonald m. 22 April 1903
- Profession: merchant

Archibald John Macdonald (9 January 1876 – 11 January 1938) was a Canadian businessman and politician. Macdonald was a Liberal party member of the House of Commons of Canada. He was born in Lancaster, Ontario.

Macdonald was educated to secondary school level. In 1903, he became clerk and treasurer for Lancaster Township. Macdonald unsuccessfully campaigned for a seat in the Legislative Assembly of Ontario during the 1919 provincial election.

He was first elected to Parliament at the Glengarry riding in the 1925 general election and re-elected there in the 1926 election. After completing his second term, the 16th Canadian Parliament, Macdonald left federal politics and did not seek re-election in the 1930 vote.
