= Jacob Thomas Schell =

Canadian politician

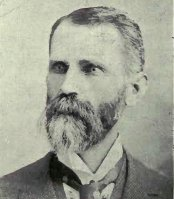

Member of the Canadian Parliament for Glengarry
- In office 1900–1908
- Preceded by: Roderick R. McLennan
- Succeeded by: John Angus McMillan

Personal details
- Born: 27 December 1850 East Oxford Township, Canada West
- Died: 29 July 1916 (aged 65) Woodstock, Ontario, Canada
- Party: Liberal

Jacob Thomas Schell (27 December 1850 – 29 July 1916) was a merchant and political figure. He represented Glengarry in the House of Commons of Canada from 1900 to 1908 as a Liberal member.

He was born in East Oxford Township, Canada West in 1850, the son of Jacob Schell, and educated in Woodstock. He is greatgrandson of Johann Christian Schell, a Palatine German from German Flatts, New York, who died fighting for the Americans in 1782 on his farm. The family moved to Canada after the American Revolution to take advantage of the land available in Ontario. In 1882, he moved to Alexandria and became a partner with David Murdoch Macpherson in a cheese box factory there. The company also manufactured other wooden items. Schell was also involved in railway construction. He ran unsuccessfully for the same seat in the House of Commons in 1891. Schell served on the town council of Alexandria. After his death in 1916, he was buried in Woodstock.

His brother Malcolm Smith Schell also served in the Canadian House of Commons, and at the same time.
