= John David MacRae =

Canadian politician

Member of Parliament for Glengarry
- In office October 1935 – March 1940
- Preceded by: Angus McGillis
- Succeeded by: William MacDiarmid

Personal details
- Born: John David MacRae; 19 February 1876 Apple Hill, Ontario, Canada
- Died: 20 February 1967 (aged 91)
- Party: Liberal
- Spouse(s): Hazel Carlyle m. 19 September 1918
- Profession: farmer

John David MacRae (19 February 1876 – 20 February 1967) was a Liberal party member of the House of Commons of Canada. He was born in Apple Hill, Ontario and became a farmer.

MacRae served as councillor and reeve of Kenyon Township.

He was first elected to Parliament at the Glengarry riding in the 1935 general election. After serving one term, the 18th Canadian Parliament, MacRae campaigned under the Conservative-based National Government party banner for the 1940 election but was defeated by William MacDiarmid of the Liberals.
