= Glengarry and Stormont =

Former federal electoral district in Ontario, Canada

Ontario electoral district

Defunct federal electoral district
- Legislature: House of Commons
- District created: 1914
- District abolished: 1924
- First contested: 1917
- Last contested: 1921

Glengarry and Stormont was a federal electoral district represented in the House of Commons of Canada from 1917 to 1925. It was located in the province of Ontario. This riding was created in 1914 from parts of Glengarry and Stormont ridings.

It consisted of the county of Glengarry and Stormont, with the townships of Cornwall and Roxborough, and the town of Cornwall.

The electoral district was abolished in 1924 when it was redistributed between Glengarry and Stormont ridings.

== Members of Parliament ==
This riding has elected the following members of Parliament:

Parliament	Years	Member	Party
Riding created from Glengarry and Stormont
13th	1917–1918	John McMartin	Government (Unionist)
13th	1919–1921	John Wilfred Kennedy	United Farmers of Ontario
14th	1921–1925	John Wilfred Kennedy	Progressive
Riding dissolved into Glengarry and Stormont

== Election results ==
1917 Canadian federal election
Party	Candidate	Votes
Government (Unionist)	John McMartin	acclaimed

On Mr. McMartin's death, 12 April 1918:

By-election on 27 October 1919
Party	Candidate	Votes
United Farmers–Labour	John Wilfred Kennedy||align="right"| 7,581
Government (Unionist)	Chilion Longley Hervey	5,205

1921 Canadian federal election
Party	Candidate	Votes
Progressive	John Wilfred Kennedy	6,320
Liberal	Joseph Elphège Chevrier	5,942
Conservative	Chilion Longley Hervey	3,892

== See also ==
- List of Canadian electoral districts
- Historical federal electoral districts of Canada
