= William MacDiarmid =

Canadian politician (1875–1947)

Member of Parliament for Glengarry
- In office March 1940 – June 1945
- Preceded by: John David MacRae
- Succeeded by: William Lyon Mackenzie King

Personal details
- Born: William Burton MacDiarmid; 23 May 1875 Athol, Ontario, Canada
- Died: 13 May 1947 (aged 71) Maxville, Ontario, Canada
- Party: Liberal
- Spouse(s): Eva Smillie m. 28 September 1911
- Profession: physician

William Burton MacDiarmid (23 May 1875 – 13 May 1947) was a Liberal party member of the House of Commons of Canada. He was born in Athol, Ontario and became a physician by career.

MacDiarmid graduated from McGill University where he received his medical degree (MDCM). He became a Health Officer in the communities of Maxville and Roxborough Township.

He was first elected to Parliament at the Glengarry riding in the 1940 general election and re-elected in 1945. MacDiarmid resigned on 22 June 1945 to allow William Lyon Mackenzie King to campaign for and hold the riding in a by-election after King had suffered personal defeat in the general election in his riding of Prince Albert. MacDiarmid died unexpectedly on 13 May 1947 at his residence in Maxville due to heart failure.
