= John McLennan =

Canadian politician

For other people with the same or similar name see John McLennan (disambiguation) .

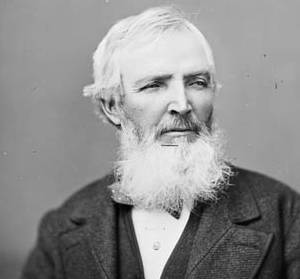
John McLennan Source: Library and Archives Canada

John McLennan (26 February 1821 – 18 December 1893) was an Ontario businessman and political figure. He represented Glengarry as a Liberal-Conservative member of the House of Commons of Canada from 1879 to 1882.

He was born in Williamstown in Upper Canada in 1821, the son of a Scottish immigrant. He served as president of the Montreal Board of Trade and vice-president of the Merchants' Bank of Canada. With his brother Hugh, he established a firm involved in shipping and grain processing. McLennan lived at Lancaster. He died in Montreal in 1893, and is buried on Mont Royal.

Five years after his death in 1898, his widow Charlotte Adelaide (Mair) McLennan established a church and parish hall in his memory. Located on part of McLennan's former Ridgewood estate, St. John the Evangelist Anglican Church remains open to this day, surrounded by the Glengarry Campground of the St. Lawrence Parks Commission in South Glengarry, Ontario.
