= John Wilfred Kennedy =

Canadian politician

John Wilfred Kennedy (October 10, 1879 – November 19, 1949) was a farmer and political figure in Ontario. Canada. He represented Glengarry and Stormont in the House of Commons of Canada from 1919 to 1925 as a United Farmers and then Progressive Party member.

He was born in Apple Hill, Ontario, the son of John Kennedy and Catherine McDougall, and was educated in Alexandria, Ontario and the Ontario Agricultural College. In 1915, Kennedy married Helen Meehan. He farmed at Apple Hill. He served on the council for Kenyon Township from 1913 to 1916 and was deputy reeve from 1917 to 1918 and reeve in 1919. Kennedy was defeated when he ran for reelection in 1925 in the restructured riding of Glengarry. Kennedy later sold his farm and opened a business college in Ottawa, Ontario. For a time, he was employed by the federal Income Tax department.
