= Angus McGillis =

Canadian politician

Member of Parliament for Glengarry
- In office 1930–1935
- Preceded by: Archibald John Macdonald
- Succeeded by: John David MacRae

Ontario MPP
- In office 1926–1929
- Preceded by: James Alexander Sangster
- Succeeded by: James Alexander Sangster
- Constituency: Glengarry

Personal details
- Born: September 8, 1874 Williamstown, Ontario, Canada
- Died: September 11, 1944 (aged 70)
- Party: Conservative
- Occupation: Farmer

Angus McGillis (September 8, 1874 – September 11, 1944) was a Canadian farmer and political figure in Ontario. He represented Glengarry in the Legislative Assembly of Ontario from 1926 to 1929 and in the House of Commons of Canada from 1930 to 1935 as a Conservative member.

He was born in Williamstown, Ontario, the son of Hugh McGillis, and was educated there. He was also a livestock dealer. McGillis was an unsuccessful candidate for a seat in the federal parliament in 1925. He was defeated in 1929 by James Alexander Sangster for a seat in the provincial assembly but was elected to the House of Commons the following year. He was defeated by John David MacRae in the 1935 federal election.
