= William Major (Ontario politician) =

Canadian politician

Member of Parliament for Glengarry
- In office June 1949 – August 1953
- Preceded by: W. L. Mackenzie King
- Succeeded by: riding dissolved

Personal details
- Born: William Joseph Major; 12 April 1896 North Lancaster, Ontario, Canada
- Died: 24 February 1966 (aged 69)
- Party: Liberal
- Spouse(s): Gabrielle Besner m. 3 February 1920
- Profession: poultry farmer

William Joseph Major (12 April 1896 – 24 February 1966) was a Liberal party member of the House of Commons of Canada. He was born in North Lancaster, Ontario.

Major attended International Business College in Montreal, then became a poultry farmer. He was an Ontario municipal politician for Lancaster Township as a councillor from 1931 to 1934, then deputy reeve from 1935 to 1938, then reeve from 1939 to 1946.

He was first elected to Parliament at the Glengarry riding in the 1949 general election. After serving his only term in the House of Commons, Major campaigned as an Independent Liberal and was defeated by Raymond Bruneau of the Liberal party in the 1953 election, when his riding became Glengarry—Prescott.
