= Glengarry (federal electoral district) =

Former federal electoral district in Ontario, Canada

Ontario electoral district

Defunct federal electoral district
- Legislature: House of Commons
- District created: 1867, 1924
- District abolished: 1914, 1966
- First contested: 1867
- Last contested: 1965

Glengarry was a federal electoral district represented in the House of Commons of Canada from 1867 to 1917, and from 1925 to 1953. It was located in the province of Ontario. It was created by the British North America Act 1867, and consisted of Glengarry county.

The electoral district was abolished in 1914 when it was merged into Glengarry and Stormont riding.

It was recreated in 1924, consisting again of the county of Glengarry.

The electoral district was abolished in 1952 when it was merged into Glengarry—Prescott ridings.

== Members of Parliament ==
This riding elected the following members of the House of Commons of Canada:

Parliament	Years	Member	Party
1st	1867–1872	Donald Alexander Macdonald	Liberal
2nd	1872–1873	Donald Alexander Macdonald	Liberal
2nd	1873–1874	Donald Alexander Macdonald	Liberal
3rd	1874–1875	Donald Alexander Macdonald	Liberal
3rd	1875–1876	Archibald McNab	Liberal
3rd	1876–1878	Archibald McNab	Liberal
4th	1878–1882	John McLennan	Liberal–Conservative
5th	1882–1887	Donald Macmaster	Conservative
6th	1887–1891	Patrick Purcell	Liberal
7th	1891–1892	Roderick R. McLennan	Conservative
7th	1892–1896	Roderick R. McLennan	Conservative
8th	1896–1900	Roderick R. McLennan	Conservative
9th	1900–1904	Jacob Thomas Schell	Liberal
10th	1904–1908	Jacob Thomas Schell	Liberal
11th	1908–1911	John Angus McMillan	Liberal
12th	1911–1917	John Angus McMillan	Liberal
Riding dissolved into Glengarry and Stormont
Riding re-created from Glengarry and Stormont
15th	1925–1926	Archibald John Macdonald	Liberal
16th	1926–1930	Archibald John Macdonald	Liberal
17th	1930–1935	Angus McGillis	Conservative
18th	1935–1940	John David MacRae	Liberal
19th	1940–1945	William MacDiarmid	Liberal
20th	1945–1945	William MacDiarmid	Liberal
20th	1945–1949	William Lyon Mackenzie King	Liberal
21st	1949–1953	William Major	Liberal
Riding dissolved into Glengarry—Prescott

== Election results ==
=== 1867–1917 ===
1867 Canadian federal election
Party	Candidate	Votes
Liberal	Donald Macdonald	acclaimed
Source: Canadian Elections Database

1872 Canadian federal election
Party	Candidate	Votes
Liberal	Donald Alexander Macdonald	1,289
Unknown	R. H. MacDonald	193
Source: Canadian Elections Database

On Mr. Macdonald's appointment as Postmaster General for Canada, 7 November 1873:

By-election on 26 November 1873
Party	Candidate	Votes
Liberal	Donald Alexander Macdonald	acclaimed

1874 Canadian federal election
Party	Candidate	Votes
Liberal	Donald Alexander Macdonald	1,288
Unknown	A. J. Grant	612
Source: lop.parl.ca

On Mr. Macdonald's appointment as Lieutenant-Governor of Ontario, 18 May 1875:

By-election on 7 July 1875
Party	Candidate	Votes
Liberal	Archibald McNab	1,227
Unknown	Donald McMillan	945

As Mr. McNab was unseated, 27 June 1876:

By-election on 31 July 1876
Party	Candidate	Votes
Liberal	Archibald McNab	1,203
Unknown	John McLennan	1,032

1878 Canadian federal election
Party	Candidate	Votes
Liberal–Conservative	John McLennan	1,330
Unknown	Archibald McNab	1,269
Source: Canadian Elections Database

1882 Canadian federal election
Party	Candidate	Votes
Conservative	Donald Macmaster	1,499
Liberal	D. A. McDonald	1,276

1887 Canadian federal election
Party	Candidate	Votes
Liberal	Patrick Purcell	2,020
Conservative	Donald Macmaster	1,814

1891 Canadian federal election
Party	Candidate	Votes
Conservative	Roderick R. McLennan	1,953
Liberal	Jacob Thomas Schell	1,632

As Mr. McLennan was unseated, January 1892:

By-election on 14 January 1892
Party	Candidate	Votes
Conservative	Roderick R. McLennan	acclaimed

1896 Canadian federal election
Party	Candidate	Votes
Conservative	Roderick R. McLennan	2,486
Patrons of Industry	James Lockie Wilson	1,752

1900 Canadian federal election
Party	Candidate	Votes
Liberal	Jacob Thomas Schell	2,392
Conservative	Roderick R. McLennan	1,772

1904 Canadian federal election
Party	Candidate	Votes
Liberal	Jacob Thomas Schell	2,349
Conservative	Donald Robert McDonald	1,899

1908 Canadian federal election
Party	Candidate	Votes
Liberal	John Angus McMillan	2,279
Conservative	John F. McGregor	1,958

1911 Canadian federal election
Party	Candidate	Votes
Liberal	John Angus McMillan	2,175
Conservative	Duncan McMartin	1,949

=== 1925–1949 ===
1925 Canadian federal election
Party	Candidate	Votes
Liberal	Archibald John Macdonald	2,785
Conservative	Angus McGillis	2,628
Progressive	John Wilfred Kennedy	2,519

1926 Canadian federal election
Party	Candidate	Votes
Liberal	Archibald John Macdonald	4,382
Conservative	Duncan D. MacCuaig	3,749

1930 Canadian federal election
Party	Candidate	Votes
Conservative	Angus McGillis	5,059
Liberal	Joseph A. C. Huot	3,830

1935 Canadian federal election
Party	Candidate	Votes
Liberal	John David MacRae	4,548
Conservative	Angus McGillis	3,202
Reconstruction	John Alexander MacDonell	1,052

1940 Canadian federal election
Party	Candidate	Votes
Liberal	William MacDiarmid	4,578
National Government	John David MacRae	2,813

1945 Canadian federal election
Party	Candidate	Votes
Liberal	William MacDiarmid	4,934
Progressive Conservative	Lionel Devaux	2,881
Co-operative Commonwealth	John A. Dewar	411

Canadian federal by-election, August 6, 1945 On William MacDiarmid's acceptance of an office of emolument under the Crown, June 22, 1945
Party	Candidate	Votes	%
Liberal	William Lyon Mackenzie King	4,551	93.33
Independent	Richard Monahan	325	6.67
Total valid votes		4,876	100.0
Source(s) "Glengarry, Ontario (1925-09-05 - 1953-06-12)". History of Federal Ridings Since 1867. Library of Parliament.

1949 Canadian federal election
Party	Candidate	Votes
Liberal	William Major	4,809
Progressive Conservative	John D. MacLeod	3,559
Social Credit	John Joseph Fitzgerald	300

== See also ==
- List of Canadian electoral districts
- Historical federal electoral districts of Canada

Parliament of Canada
Preceded by Prince Albert	Constituency represented by the prime minister 1945-1948	Succeeded by Quebec East
