= John McLennan (disambiguation) =

John McLennan and similar may refer to:

People bearing the name-

- John McLennan ( 1821–1893), businessman and politician, Ontario, Canada
- John McLennan (1867–1935, a Canadian physicist

With a similar spelling:-

- John McLennon (1855–1888), a US Army musician
- John McLenan (1827–1865), an American illustrator
