= William Lyon Mackenzie King =

Canadian prime minister (1874–1950)

The Right Honourable William Lyon Mackenzie King PC OM CMG
- Mackenzie King in 1941

10th Prime Minister of Canada
- In office October 23, 1935 – November 15, 1948
- Monarchs: George V; Edward VIII; George VI
- Governors General: The Earl of Bessborough; The Lord Tweedsmuir; The Earl of Athlone; The Viscount Alexander
- Preceded by: R. B. Bennett
- Succeeded by: Louis St. Laurent
- In office September 25, 1926 – August 7, 1930
- Monarch: George V
- Governors General: The Lord Byng of Vimy; The Viscount Willingdon
- Preceded by: Arthur Meighen
- Succeeded by: R. B. Bennett
- In office December 29, 1921 – June 28, 1926
- Monarch: George V
- Governor General: The Lord Byng of Vimy
- Preceded by: Arthur Meighen
- Succeeded by: Arthur Meighen
Senior political offices
Leader of the Opposition
In office August 7, 1930 – October 22, 1935
Preceded by	R. B. Bennett
Succeeded by	R. B. Bennett
In office June 29, 1926 – September 24, 1926
Preceded by	Arthur Meighen
Succeeded by	Vacant
In office August 7, 1919 – December 28, 1921
Preceded by	Daniel Duncan McKenzie
Succeeded by	Arthur Meighen
Leader of the Liberal Party
In office August 7, 1919 – August 7, 1948
Preceded by	Daniel Duncan McKenzie (interim)
Succeeded by	Louis St. Laurent
Ministerial offices
Secretary of State for External Affairs
In office October 23, 1935 – September 4, 1946
Prime Minister	Himself
Preceded by	R. B. Bennett
Succeeded by	Louis St. Laurent
In office September 25, 1926 – August 7, 1930
Prime Minister	Himself
Preceded by	Arthur Meighen
Succeeded by	R. B. Bennett
In office December 29, 1921 – June 28, 1926
Prime Minister	Himself
Preceded by	Arthur Meighen
Succeeded by	Arthur Meighen
Minister of Labour
In office June 2, 1909 – October 6, 1911
Prime Minister	Wilfrid Laurier
Preceded by	Position established
Succeeded by	Thomas Wilson Crothers

Member of Parliament
- In office August 6, 1945 – June 26, 1949
- Preceded by: William MacDiarmid
- Succeeded by: William Major
- Constituency: Glengarry
- In office February 15, 1926 – June 10, 1945
- Preceded by: Charles McDonald
- Succeeded by: Edward LeRoy Bowerman
- Constituency: Prince Albert
- In office October 20, 1919 – October 28, 1925
- Preceded by: Joseph Read
- Succeeded by: Thomas Herbert Lennox
- Constituency: Prince (1919–1921); York North (1921–1925)
- In office October 26, 1908 – September 21, 1911
- Preceded by: Joseph E. Seagram
- Succeeded by: William George Weichel
- Constituency: Waterloo North

Personal details
- Born: December 17, 1874 Berlin, Ontario, Canada
- Died: July 22, 1950 (aged 75) Chelsea, Quebec, Canada
- Resting place: Mount Pleasant Cemetery, Toronto, Ontario
- Party: Liberal
- Other political affiliations: Laurier Liberals (1917–1919)
- Education: University of Toronto (BA, MA, LLB); University of Chicago (no degree); Harvard University (MA, PhD)
- William Lyon Mackenzie King's voice King speaking about his election campaign in 1937

William Lyon Mackenzie King (December 17, 1874 – July 22, 1950) was the tenth prime minister of Canada for three non-consecutive terms from 1921 to 1926, 1926 to 1930, and 1935 to 1948. A Liberal, he was the dominant politician in Canada from the early 1920s to the late 1940s. (Note: King and the Liberals were briefly out of power from 1930 to 1935.) With a total of 21 years and 154 days in office, he remains the longest-serving prime minister in Canadian history.

King studied law and political economy in the 1890s and later obtained a PhD, the first Canadian prime minister to have done so. In 1900, he became deputy minister of the Canadian government's new Department of Labour. He entered the House of Commons in 1908 before becoming the first federal minister of labour in 1909 under Prime Minister Wilfrid Laurier. After losing his seat in the 1911 federal election, King worked for the Rockefeller Foundation before briefly working as an industrial consultant. Following the death of Laurier in 1919, King won the leadership of the Liberal Party. Taking the helm of a party torn apart by the Conscription Crisis of 1917, he unified both the pro-conscription and anti-conscription factions of the party, leading it to victory in the 1921 federal election.

King established a post-war agenda which lowered wartime taxes and tariffs. He sought to strengthen Canadian autonomy by refusing to support Britain in the Chanak Crisis without Parliament's consent and negotiating the Halibut Treaty with the United States without British interference. His government also passed the Chinese Immigration Act, 1923, which banned most forms of Chinese immigration to Canada. In the 1925 federal election, the Conservatives won a plurality of seats, but the Liberals negotiated support from the Progressive Party and stayed in office as a minority government. In 1926, facing a Commons vote that could force his government to resign, King asked Governor General Lord Byng to dissolve Parliament and call an election. Byng refused and invited the Conservatives to form government, who briefly held office but lost a motion of no confidence. This sequence of events triggered a major constitutional crisis, the King–Byng affair. King and the Liberals won the resulting election. Afterwards, King pursued a more independent foreign policy, including by expanding the Department of External Affairs. His government also introduced old-age pensions based on need. King's slow reaction to the Great Depression led to a defeat at the polls in the 1930 federal election.

In the 1935 federal election, King's Liberal Party returned to power in a landslide victory, defeating R.B. Bennett's Conservative government whose response to the depression was unpopular. King negotiated the 1935 Canada-United States Reciprocal Trade Agreement, nationalized the Bank of Canada, and passed the 1938 National Housing Act to improve housing affordability. His government also established the Canadian Broadcasting Corporation, Trans-Canada Air Lines, and the National Film Board. Days after World War II broke out, King deployed Canadian troops. The Liberals' second landslide victory in the 1940 federal election allowed King to continue leading Canada through the war. Soon after, his government signed the Ogdensburg Agreement with the United States which established the Permanent Joint Board on Defense. King oversaw the internment of Japanese Canadians on the domestic front and delayed introducing overseas conscription until late 1944 to satisfy French Canadians. He also introduced unemployment insurance and family allowances—Canada's first universal welfare program. Following the Allies' victory in 1945, King called a post-war election, in which the Liberals lost their majority government. In his final years in office, King oversaw Canada's entry into the United Nations, partnered Canada with Western nations in the deepening Cold War, introduced Canadian citizenship, and successfully negotiated Newfoundland's entry into Confederation.

King retired from politics in late 1948 and died of pneumonia in July 1950. He is best known for his leadership of Canada throughout the Great Depression and World War II, and he played a major role in developing the Canadian welfare state and establishing Canada's international position as a middle power. Meanwhile, King kept secret his beliefs in spiritualism and the use of mediums to stay in contact with departed associates, particularly with his mother, and allowed his intense spirituality to distort his understanding of Adolf Hitler throughout the late 1930s. Historian Jack Granatstein notes, "the scholars expressed little admiration for King the man but offered unbounded admiration for his political skills and attention to Canadian unity." In multiple surveys, scholars have ranked King among the top three Canadian prime ministers.

== Early life (1874–1891) ==
William Lyon Mackenzie King was born in a frame house rented by his parents at 43 Benton Street in Berlin (now Kitchener), Ontario to John King and Isabel Grace Mackenzie. His maternal grandfather was William Lyon Mackenzie, first mayor of Toronto and leader of the Upper Canada Rebellion in 1837. His father was a lawyer and later a lecturer at Osgoode Hall Law School. King had three siblings: older sister Isabel "Bella" Christina Grace (1873–1915), younger sister Janet "Jennie" Lindsey (1876–1962) and younger brother Dougall Macdougall "Max" (1878–1922). Within his family, he was known as Willie; during his university years, he adopted W. L. Mackenzie King as his signature and began using Mackenzie as his preferred name with those outside the family.

King's father was a lawyer with a struggling practice in a small city, and never enjoyed financial security. His parents lived a life of shabby gentility, employing servants and tutors they could scarcely afford, although their financial situation improved somewhat following a move to Toronto around 1890, where King lived with them for several years in a duplex on Beverley Street while studying at the University of Toronto.

King became a lifelong practising Presbyterian with a dedication to social reform based on his Christian duty. He never favoured socialism.

== University (1891–1900) ==
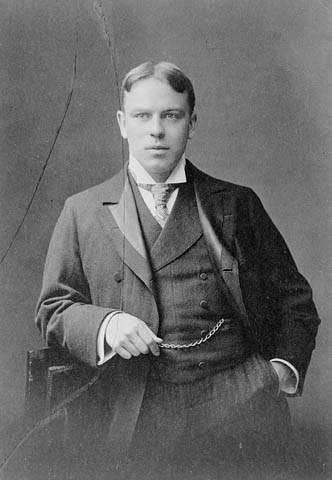
King in 1899

King enrolled at the University of Toronto in 1891. He obtained a BA degree in 1895, an LLB degree in 1896, and an MA in 1897, all from the university. While studying in Toronto he met a wide circle of friends, many of whom became prominent. He was an early member and officer of the Kappa Alpha Society, which included a number of these individuals (two future Ontario Supreme Court Justices and the future chairman of the university itself). It encouraged debate on political ideas. He also was simultaneously a part of the Literary Society with Arthur Meighen, a future political rival.

King was especially concerned with issues of social welfare and was influenced by the settlement house movement pioneered by Toynbee Hall in London, England. He played a central role in fomenting a students' strike at the university in 1895. He was in close touch, behind the scenes, with Vice-Chancellor William Mulock, for whom the strike provided a chance to embarrass his rivals Chancellor Edward Blake and President James Loudon. King failed to gain his immediate objective, a teaching position at the university but earned political credit with Mulock, the man who would invite him to Ottawa and make him a deputy minister only five years later. While studying at the University of Toronto, King also contributed to the campus newspaper, The Varsity, and served as president of the yearbook committee in 1896. King subsequently wrote for The Globe, The Mail and Empire, and the Toronto News. Fellow journalist W. A. Hewitt recalled that, the city editor of the Toronto News left him in charge one afternoon with instructions to fire King if he showed up. When Hewitt sat at the editor's desk, King showed up a few minutes later and resigned before Hewitt could tell him he was fired.

After studying at the University of Chicago and working with Jane Addams at her settlement house, Hull House, King proceeded to Harvard University. While at the University of Chicago, he participated on their track team as a half-mile runner. He earned an MA in political economy from Harvard in 1898. In 1909, Harvard granted him a PhD degree for a dissertation titled "Oriental Immigration to Canada." King was the first Canadian prime minister to have earned a PhD. (Note: The only other to do so is Mark Carney.)

== Early career, civil servant (1900–1908) ==
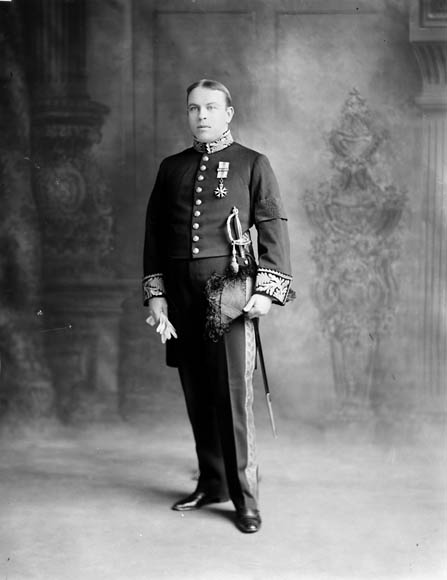
Wearing court uniform as minister of labour in 1910

In 1900, King became editor of the federal government-owned Labour Gazette, a publication that explored complex labour issues. Later that year, he was appointed as deputy minister of the Canadian government's new Department of Labour, and became active in policy domains from Japanese immigration to railways, notably the Industrial Disputes Investigations Act (1907) which sought to avert labour strikes by prior conciliation.

In 1901, King's roommate and best friend, Henry Albert Harper, died heroically during a skating party when a young woman fell through the ice of the partly frozen Ottawa River. Harper dove into the water to try to save her, and perished in the attempt. King led the effort to raise a memorial to Harper, which resulted in the erection of the Sir Galahad statue on Parliament Hill in 1905. In 1906, King published a memoir of Harper, entitled The Secret of Heroism.

While deputy minister of labour, King was appointed to investigate the causes of and claims for compensation resulting from the 1907 anti-Oriental riots in Vancouver's Chinatown and Japantown. One of the claims for damages came from Chinese opium dealers, which led King to investigate narcotics use in Vancouver, British Columbia. Following the investigation King reported that white women were also opium users, not just Chinese men, and the federal government used the report to justify the first legislation outlawing narcotics in Canada.

== Early political career, minister of labour (1908–1911) ==
King was first elected to Parliament as a Liberal in the 1908 federal election, representing Waterloo North. In 1909, King was appointed as the first-ever minister of labour by Prime Minister Wilfrid Laurier.

King's term as minister of labour was marked by two significant achievements. He led the passage of the Industrial Disputes Investigation Act and the Combines Investigation Act, which he had shaped during his civil and parliamentary service. The legislation significantly improved the financial situation for millions of Canadian workers. In 1910 Mackenzie King introduced a bill aimed at establishing an 8-hour day on public works but it was killed in the Senate. He lost his seat in the 1911 general election, which saw the Conservatives defeat the Liberals and form government.

== Out of politics (1911–1919) ==
=== Ontario Liberals head ===
Just six week after his electoral defeat in Waterloo North, King accepted the role of president of the General Reform Association of Ontario, i.e. the Ontario Liberal Party, (Note: From around 1905 to 1921, the General Reform Association was the formal operational apparatus of the party) just as the provincial party was being hit by a bizarre crisis and was ill-prepared for an early election call. Incumbent Ontario Liberal leader A.G. McKay was embroiled in a salacious lawsuit (later proven to be baseless) and resigned on the eve of 1911 provincial election campaign. King's first formal task as president was to present Newton Rowell, the new party leader with no experience in elected office chosen by a committee of Liberal MPPs and MPs, to a hastily convene special general meeting of the party. Two days later in a print advertisement in his name as party president, King issued an urgent appeal for prospective Liberal candidates to step into the field. Despite his effort, the Liberals failed to field candidates in 28 electoral districts, resulting in seventeen Conservatives being elected by acclamation in the 1911 election, the largest number ever in Ontario history. King spent the following two years on lecture circuit on behalf of the party.

=== Industrial consultant ===
In June 1914 John D. Rockefeller Jr. hired him at the Rockefeller Foundation in New York City, to head its new Department of Industrial Research. It paid $12,000 per year, compared to the meagre $2,500 per year the Liberal Party was paying. He worked for the Foundation until 1918, forming a close working association and friendship with Rockefeller, advising him through the turbulent period of the 1913–1914 Strike and Ludlow Massacre–in what is known as the Colorado Coalfield War–at a family-owned coal company in Colorado, which subsequently set the stage for a new era in labour management in America. King became one of the earliest expert practitioners in the emerging field of industrial relations.

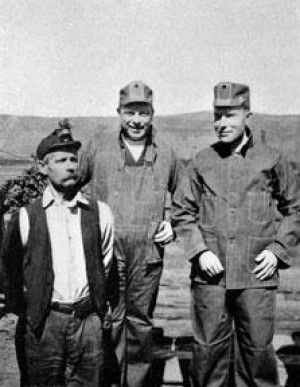
Rockefeller (right) and Mackenzie King (center) with a miner in 1915 after the Colorado Coalfield War

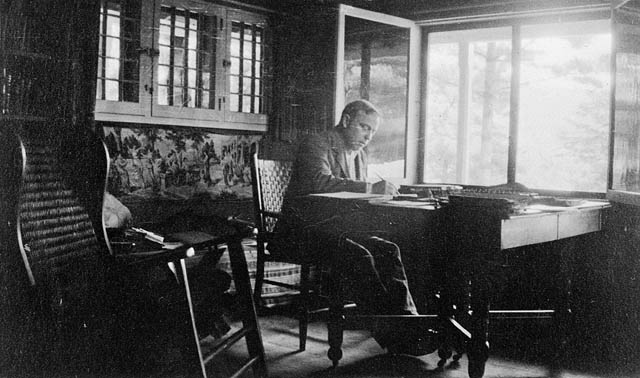
King, while writing Industry and Humanity, 1917

King was not a pacifist, but he showed little enthusiasm for the Great War; he faced criticism for not serving in Canada's military and instead working for the Rockefellers. However, he was nearly 40 years old when the war began, and was not in good physical condition. He never gave up his Ottawa home, and travelled to the United States on an as-needed basis, performing service to the war effort by helping to keep war-related industries running smoothly.

In 1918, King, assisted by his friend F. A. McGregor, published Industry and Humanity: A Study in the Principles Underlying Industrial Reconstruction, a dense, abstract book he wrote in response to the Ludlow massacre. It went over the heads of most readers, but revealed the practical idealism behind King's political thinking. He argued that capital and labour were natural allies, not foes, and that the community at large (represented by the government) should be the third and decisive party in industrial disputes. He expressed derision for syndicates and trades unions, chastising them for aiming at the "destruction by force of existing organization, and the transfer of industrial capital from the present possessors" to themselves.

Quitting the Rockefeller Foundation in February 1918, King became an independent consultant on labour issues for the next two years, earning $1,000 per week from leading American corporations. Even so, he kept his official residence in Ottawa, hoping for a call to duty.

=== Wartime politics ===
In 1917, Canada was in crisis; King supported Liberal leader Wilfrid Laurier in his opposition to conscription, which was violently opposed in the province of Quebec. The Liberal party became deeply split, with several Anglophones joining the pro-conscription Union government, a coalition controlled by the Conservatives under Prime Minister Robert Borden. King returned to Canada to run in the 1917 election, which focused almost entirely on the conscription issue. Unable to overcome a landslide against Laurier, King lost in the constituency of York North, which his grandfather had once represented.

== Opposition leader (1919–1921) ==
=== 1919 leadership election ===
The Liberal Party was deeply divided by Quebec's opposition to conscription and the agrarian revolt in Ontario and the Prairies. Levin argues that when King returned to politics in 1919, he was a rusty outsider with a weak base facing a nation bitterly split by language, regionalism and class. He outmaneuvered more senior competitors by embracing Laurier's legacy, championing labour interests, calling for welfare reform, and offering solid opposition to the Conservative rivals. When Laurier died in 1919, King was elected leader in the first Liberal leadership convention, defeating his three rivals on the fourth ballot. He won thanks to the support of the Quebec bloc, organized by Ernest Lapointe (1876–1941), later King's long-time lieutenant in Quebec. King could not speak French, but in election after election for the next 20 years (save for 1930), Lapointe produced the critical seats to give the Liberals control of the Commons. When campaigning in Quebec, King portrayed Lapointe as co-prime minister.

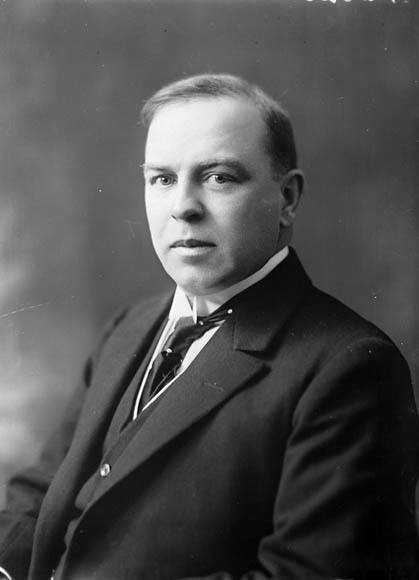
King, 1919

=== Idealizes the Prairies ===
Once King became the Liberal leader in 1919 he paid closer attention to the Prairies, a fast-developing region. Viewing a sunrise in Alberta in 1920, he wrote in his diary, "I thought of the New Day, the New Social Order. It seems like Heaven's prophecy of the dawn of a new era, revealed to me." Pragmatism played a role as well, since his party depended for its survival on the votes of Progressive Party Members of Parliament, many of whom who represented farmers in Ontario and the Prairies. He convinced many Progressives to return to the Liberal fold.

=== 1921 federal election ===
In the 1921 election, King's Liberals defeated the Conservatives led by Prime Minister Arthur Meighen, winning a narrow majority of 118 out of 235 seats. The Conservatives won 50, the newly formed Progressive Party won 58 (but declined to form the official Opposition), and the remaining ten seats went to Labour MPs and Independents; most of these ten supported the Progressives. King became prime minister.

== Prime Minister (1921–1926, 1926–1930) ==
As prime minister of Canada, King was appointed to the Privy Council of the United Kingdom on June 20, 1922 and was sworn at Buckingham Palace on October 11, 1923, during the 1923 Imperial Conference.

=== Balancing act ===
During his first term of office, from 1921 to 1926, King sought to lower wartime taxes and, especially, wartime ethnic and labour tensions. "The War is over", he argued, "and for a long time to come it is going to take all that the energies of man can do to bridge the chasm and heal the wounds which the War has made in our social life."

Despite prolonged negotiations, King was unable to attract the Progressives into his government, but once Parliament opened, he relied on their support to defeat non-confidence motions from the Conservatives. King was opposed in some policies by the Progressives, who opposed the high tariffs of the National Policy. King faced a delicate balancing act of reducing tariffs enough to please the Prairie-based Progressives, but not so much as to alienate his vital supporters in industrial Ontario and Quebec, who perceived tariffs were necessary to compete with American imports.

Over time, the Progressives gradually weakened. Their effective and passionate leader, Thomas Crerar, resigned to return to his grain business, and was replaced by the more placid Robert Forke, who joined King's cabinet in 1926 as Minister of Immigration and Colonization after becoming a Liberal-Progressive. Socialist reformer J. S. Woodsworth gradually gained influence and power, and King was able to reach an accommodation with him on policy matters. In any event, the Progressive caucus lacked the party discipline that was traditionally enforced by the Liberals and Conservatives. The Progressives had campaigned on a promise that their MP's would represent their constituents first. King used this to his advantage, as he could always count on at least a handful of Progressive MPs to shore up his near-majority position for any crucial vote.

=== Immigration ===
In 1923, King's government passed the Chinese Immigration Act, 1923 banning most forms of Chinese immigration to Canada. Immigration from most countries was controlled or restricted in some way, but only the Chinese were completely prohibited from immigrating. This was after various members of the federal and some provincial governments (especially British Columbia) put pressure on the federal government to discourage Chinese immigration.

Also in 1923, the government modified the Immigration Act to allow former subjects of Austria-Hungary to once again enter Canada. Ukrainian immigration resumed after restrictions were put in place during World War I.

=== City planning ===
King had a long-standing concern with city planning and the development of the national capital, since he had been trained in the settlement house movement and envisioned town planning and garden cities as a component of his broader program of social reform. He drew on four broad traditions in early North American planning: social planning, the Parks Movement, the City Scientific, and the City Beautiful. King's greatest impact was as the political champion for the planning and development of Ottawa, Canada's national capital. His plans, much of which were completed in the two decades after his death, were part of a century of federal planning that repositioned Ottawa as a national space in the City Beautiful style. Confederation Square, for example, was initially planned to be a civic plaza to balance the nearby federal presence of Parliament Hill and was turned into a war memorial. The Great War monument was not installed until the 1939 royal visit, and King intended that the replanning of the capital would be the World War I memorial. However, the symbolic meaning of the World War I monument gradually expanded to become the place of remembrance for all Canadian war sacrifices and includes a war memorial.

=== Corruption scandals ===
King called an election in 1925, in which the Conservatives won the most seats, but not a majority in the House of Commons. King held onto power with the support of the Progressives. A corruption scandal discovered late in his first term involved misdeeds around the expansion of the Beauharnois Canal in Quebec; this led to extensive inquiries and eventually a Royal Commission, which exposed the Beauharnois Scandal. The resulting press coverage damaged King's party in the election. Early in his second term, another corruption scandal, this time in the Department of Customs, was revealed, which led to more support for the Conservatives and Progressives, and the possibility that King would be forced to resign, if he lost sufficient support in the Commons. King had no personal connection to this scandal, although one of his own appointees was at the heart of it. Opposition leader Meighen unleashed his fierce invective towards King, stating he was hanging onto power "like a lobster with lockjaw".`

=== King–Byng Affair ===
In June 1926, King, facing a House of Commons vote connected to the customs scandal that could force his government to resign, advised the Governor General, Lord Byng, to dissolve Parliament and call another election. Byng, however, declined the Prime Minister's request – the first time in Canadian history that a request for dissolution was refused; and, to date, the only time the governor general of Canada has done so. Byng instead asked Leader of the Opposition, Arthur Meighen, to form government. Although the Conservatives held more seats in the House than any other party, they did not control a majority. They were soon themselves defeated on a motion of non-confidence on July 2. Meighen himself then requested a dissolution of Parliament, which Byng now granted.

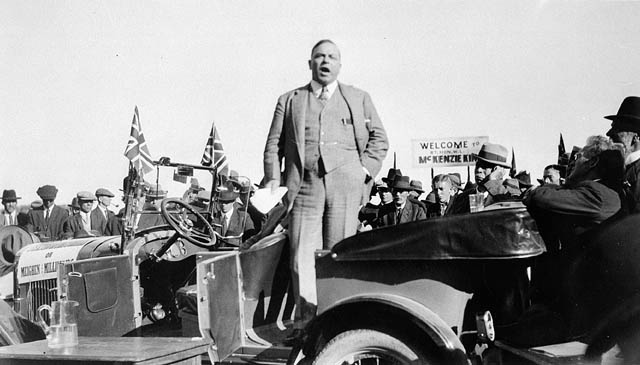
King making a speech during his 1926 election campaign

King ran the 1926 Liberal election campaign largely on the issue of the right of Canadians to govern themselves and against the interference of the Crown. The Liberal Party was returned to power with a minority government, which bolstered King's position on the issue and the position of the prime minister generally. King later pushed for greater Canadian autonomy at the 1926 Imperial Conference which elicited the Balfour Declaration stating that upon the granting of dominion status, Canada, Australia, New Zealand, Newfoundland, South Africa, and the Irish Free State, while still autonomous communities within the British Empire, ceased to be subordinate to the United Kingdom. Thus, the governor general ceased to represent the British government and was solely the personal representative of the sovereign while becoming a representative of The Crown. This ultimately was formalized in the Statute of Westminster 1931. On September 14, King and his party won the election with a plurality of seats in the Commons: 116 seats to the Conservatives' 91 in a 245-member House.

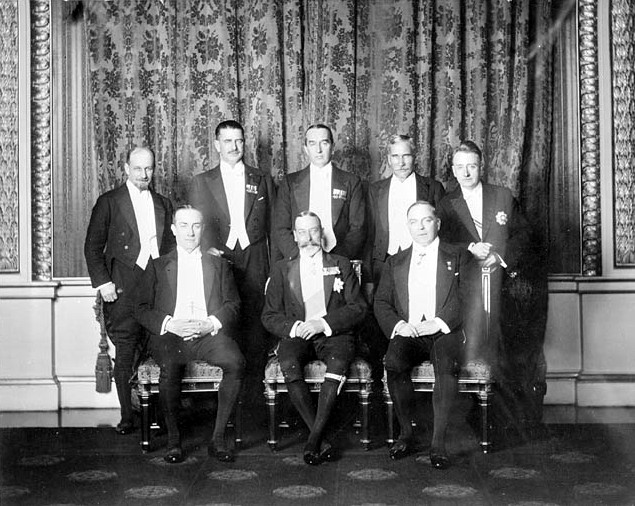
Mackenzie King (seated right) at the 1926 Imperial Conference, which led to the Balfour Declaration

=== Extending Canadian autonomy ===
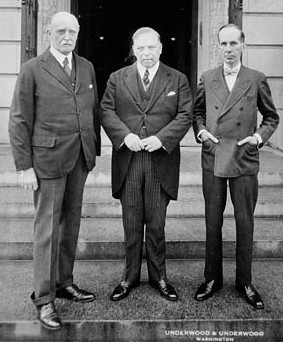
British diplomat Esme Howard, King, and Canadian diplomat Vincent Massey, first Canadian Envoy to the United States, at the Canadian Legation during a visit to Washington in 1927

During the Chanak Crisis of 1922, King refused to support the British without first consulting Parliament, while the Conservative leader, Arthur Meighen, supported Britain. King sought a Canadian voice independent of London in foreign affairs. In September 1922 the British prime minister, David Lloyd George, appealed repeatedly to King for Canadian support in the crisis. King coldly replied that the Canadian Parliament would decide what policy to follow, making clear it would not be bound by London's suggestions. King wrote in his diary of the British appeal: "I confess it annoyed me. It is drafted designedly to play the imperial game, to test out centralization versus autonomy as regards European wars...No [Canadian] contingent will go without parliament being summoned in the first instance". The British were disappointed with King's response but the crisis was soon resolved, as King had anticipated. After Chanak, King was concerned about the possibility that Canada might go to war because of its connections with Britain, writing to Violet Markham:

Anything like centralization in London, to say nothing of a direct or indirect attempt on the part of those in office in Downing Street to tell the people of the Dominions what they should or should not do, and to dictate their duty in matters of foreign policy, is certain to prove just as injurious to the so-called 'imperial solidarity' as any attempt at interference in questions of purely domestic concern. If membership within the British Commonwealth means participation by the Dominions in any and every war in which Great Britain becomes involved, without consultation, conference, or agreement of any kind in advance, I can see no hope for an enduring relationship.

For years, halibut stocks were depleting in Canadian and American fishing areas in the North Pacific Ocean. In 1923, King's government negotiated the Halibut Treaty with the United States. The treaty annually prohibited commercial fishing from November 16 to February 15; violation would result in seizure. The agreement was notable in that Canada negotiated it without a British delegate at the table and without ratification from the British Parliament; though not official, convention stated that the United Kingdom would have a seat at the table or be a signatory to any agreement Canada was part of. King argued the situation only concerned Canada and the United States. After, the British accepted King's intentions to send a separate Canadian diplomat to Washington D.C. (to represent Canada's interests) rather than a British one. At the 1923 Imperial Conference, Britain accepted the Halibut Treaty, arguing it set a new precedent for the role of British Dominions.

King expanded the Department of External Affairs, founded in 1909, to further promote Canadian autonomy from Britain. The new department took some time to develop, but over time it significantly increased the reach and projection of Canadian diplomacy. Prior to this, Canada had relied on British diplomats who owed their first loyalty to London. After the King–Byng episode, King recruited many high-calibre people for the new venture, including future prime minister Lester Pearson and influential career administrators Norman Robertson and Hume Wrong. This project was a key element of his overall strategy, setting Canada on a course independent of Britain, of former colonizer France, as well as of the neighbouring powerful United States.

Throughout his tenure, King led Canada from a dominion with responsible government to an autonomous nation within the British Commonwealth. King asserted Canadian autonomy against the British government's attempts to turn the Commonwealth into an alliance. His biographer asserts that "in this struggle Mackenzie King was the constant aggressor". The Canadian High Commissioner to Britain, Vincent Massey, claimed that an "anti-British bias" was "one of the most powerful factors in his make-up".

=== Other reforms ===
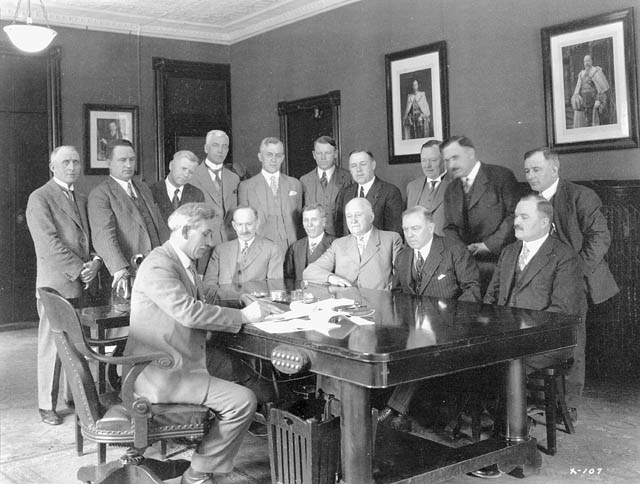
Signing of the Dominion–Provincial Agreement on old age pensions in 1928. (Seated, L–R): Peter Heenan, Thomas Donnelly, John Millar, W. R. Motherwell, William Lyon Mackenzie King, C. A. Dunning. (Standing, L–R): Fred Johnson, John Vallance, Ed Young, C. R. McIntosh, Robert McKenzie, Gordon Ross, A. F. Totzke, George McPhee, Malcolm McLean, William Bock.

In domestic affairs, King strengthened the Liberal policy of increasing the powers of the provincial governments by transferring to the governments of Manitoba, Alberta, and Saskatchewan the ownership of the crown lands within those provinces, as well as the subsoil rights; these in particular would become increasingly important, as petroleum and other natural resources proved very abundant. In collaboration with the provincial governments, he inaugurated a system of old-age pensions based on need. In February 1930, he appointed Cairine Wilson as the first female senator in Canadian history.

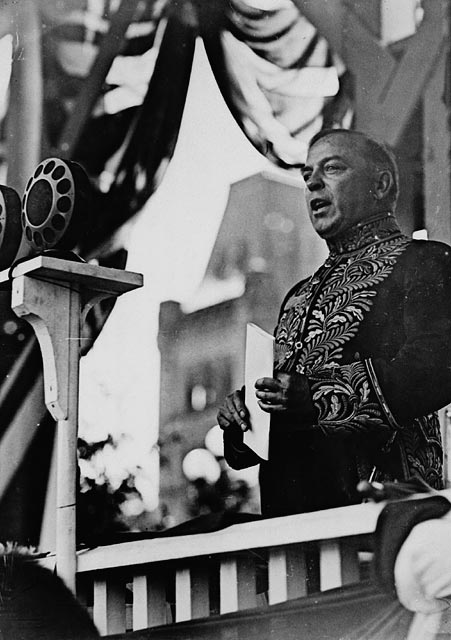
King, in court dress, speaking on Parliament Hill during a ceremony celebrating the Diamond Jubilee of Confederation in 1927

Reductions in taxation were carried out such as exemptions under the sales tax on commodities and enlarged exemptions of income tax, while in 1929 taxes on cables, telegrams, and railway and steamship tickets were removed. In 1924, a Civil Service Superannuation Act was passed with the aim of providing public servants with a suitable income upon retirement from the public service. Under c.39 of 1922, civil servants who were unfit for further duty "may be retired even if they are under 65 years of age." Under c.42 of 1922, various social provisions were introduced for returned soldiers and dependents. An Act of 1923 improved pension eligibility for returned soldiers. Entitlement to military pensions was also extended. In 1929, a previous Insurance Act was amended to enable fraternal societies to issue endowment policies for a period of twenty years or longer, and to increase their maximum policies to $10,000 under certain conditions.

Measures were also carried out to support farmers. In 1922, for instance, a measure was introduced and passed "restoring the Crow's Nest Pass railways rates on grain and flour moving eastwards from the prairie provinces." A Farm Loan Board was set up to provide rural credit; advancing funds to farmers "at rates of interest and under terms not obtainable from the usual sources," while other measures were carried out such as preventative measures against foot and mouth disease and the establishment of grading standards "to assist in the marketing of agricultural products" both at home and overseas. In addition, the Combines Investigation Act of 1923 was aimed at safeguarding consumers and producers from exploitation.

Several measures affecting labour were also carried out. In July 1922, an Order in Council was adopted to secure a more effective observance of a fair wages policy. From 1924 onwards, the employment of young persons at sea was regulated in accordance with various international labour conventions. In 1927, the Government Employees' Compensation Act was amended by the Dominion Parliament to provide (as noted by one study) "that all employees of the Dominion government in Prince Edward Island should be eligible for compensation in the same manner and at the same rate as similar workers in New Brunswick." An order of March 1930 entitled employees of the Dominion Government who worked more than 8 hours daily to an 8-hour workday with a half-holiday on Saturdays. That same year, a Fair Wages and Eight Hours Day Act was introduced.

King's strategy to address the issue of provincial-federal relations included the use of the Supreme Court of Canada as a tool to avoid contentious and politically damaging debates. In 1922, the Supreme Court Act was amended to expand the jurisdiction of the Court to hear appeals to provincial reference questions. King used the reference authority 14 times, dealing with significant issues such as aviation, discriminatory fishing licensing schemes, and water-power on navigable waterways.

=== Defeat in 1930 ===
King's government was in power at the beginning of the Great Depression, but was slow to respond to the mounting crisis. He felt that the crisis was a temporary swing of the business cycle and that the economy would soon recover without government intervention. Critics said he was out of touch. Just prior to the election, King carelessly remarked that he "would not give a five-cent piece" to Tory provincial governments for unemployment relief. The opposition made this remark a catch-phrase; the main issue was the deterioration in the economy and whether the prime minister was out of touch with the hardships of ordinary people. The Liberals lost the election of 1930 to the Conservative Party, led by Richard Bedford Bennett. The popular vote was very close between the two parties, with the Liberals actually earning more votes than in 1926, but the Conservatives had a geographical advantage that turned into enough seats to give a majority.

== Opposition leader (1930–1935) ==
After his 1930 election loss, King stayed on as Liberal leader, becoming the leader of the Opposition for the second time. He began his years as Opposition leader convinced that his government did not deserve defeat and that its financial caution had helped the economy prosper. He blamed the financial crisis on the speculative excesses of businessmen and on the weather cycle. King argued that the worst mistake Canada could make in reacting to the Depression was to raise tariffs and restrict international trade. He believed that over time, voters would learn that Bennett had deceived them and they would come to appreciate the King government's policy of frugality and free trade.

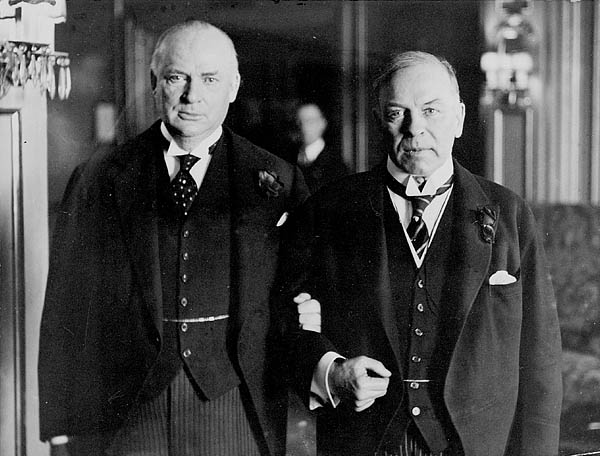
Opposition leader King (right) and Prime Minister R.B. Bennett (left), 1934

King's policy was to refrain from offering advice or alternative policies to the Conservative government. Indeed, his policy preferences were not much different from Bennett's, and he let the government have its way. Though he gave the impression of sympathy with progressive and liberal causes, he had no enthusiasm for the New Deal of U.S. president Franklin D. Roosevelt (which Bennett eventually tried to emulate, after floundering without solutions for several years), and he never advocated massive government action to alleviate the Depression in Canada.

As Opposition leader, King denounced the Bennett government's budget deficits as irresponsible, though he did not suggest his own idea of how budgets could be balanced. King also denounced the "blank cheques" that Parliament was asked to approve for relief and delayed the passage of these bills despite the objections of some Liberals, who feared the public might conclude that the party had no sympathy for those struggling. Each year, after the throne speech and the budget, King introduced amendments that blamed the Depression on Bennett's policy of high tariffs.

By the time the 1935 election arrived, the Bennett government was heavily unpopular due to its handling of the Depression. Using the slogan "King or Chaos", the Liberals won a landslide victory, winning 173 out of the Commons' 245 seats and reducing the Conservatives to a rump of 40; this was the largest majority government at the time.

== Prime Minister (1935–1948) ==
For the first time in his political career, King led an undisputed Liberal majority government. Upon his return to office in October 1935, he demonstrated a commitment (like his American counterpart Roosevelt) to the underprivileged, speaking of a new era where "poverty and adversity, want and misery are the enemies which liberalism will seek to banish from the land". Once again, King appointed himself as secretary of state for external affairs; he held this post until 1946.

=== Economic reforms ===
==== Free trade ====
Promising a much-desired trade treaty with the U.S., the King government passed the 1935 Reciprocal Trade Agreement. It marked a turning point in Canadian-American economic relations, reversing the disastrous trade war of 1930–31, lowering tariffs, and yielding a dramatic increase in trade. More subtly, it revealed to the prime minister and President Roosevelt that they could work well together.

==== Social programs ====
King's government introduced the National Employment Commission in 1936. As for the unemployed, King was hostile to federal relief. However, the first compulsory national unemployment insurance program was instituted in August 1940 under the King government after a constitutional amendment was agreed to by all of the Canadian provinces, to concede to the federal government legislative power over unemployment insurance. New Brunswick, Alberta and Quebec had held out against the federal government's desire to amend the constitution but ultimately acceded to its request, Alberta being the last to do so. The British North America Act Section 91 was amended by adding in a heading designated Number 2A simply in the words "Unemployment Insurance". As far back as February 1933, the Liberals had committed themselves to introducing unemployment insurance; with a declaration by Mackenzie King that was endorsed by all members of the parliamentary party and the National Liberal Federation in which he called for such a system to be put in place.

Over the next thirteen years, a wide range of reforms were realized during King's last period in office as prime minister. In 1937, the age for blind persons to qualify for old-age pensions was reduced to 40 in 1937, and later to 21 in 1947. In 1939, compulsory contributions for pensions for low-income widows and orphans were introduced (although these only covered the regularly employed) while depressed farmers were subsidized from that same year onwards. In 1944, family allowances were introduced. King had various arguments in favour of family allowances, one of which, as noted by one study, was that family allowances "would mean better food, clothing and medical and dental care for children in low-income families." These were approved after divisions in cabinet. In 1947, a Child Tax Deduction was introduced for families with children. From 1948 onwards the federal government subsidized medical services in the provinces; a policy which led to developments in services such as dental care.

==== Spending management ====
The provincial governments faced declining revenues and higher welfare costs. They needed federal grants and loans to reduce their deficits. In a December 1935 conference with the premiers, King announced that the federal grants would be increased until the spring of 1936. At this stage, King's main goal was to have a federal system in which each level of government would pay for its programs out of its own tax sources.

King only reluctantly accepted a Keynesian solution that involved federal deficit spending, tax cuts, and subsidies to the housing market. King and his finance minister, Charles Avery Dunning, had planned to balance the budget for 1938. However, some colleagues, to King's surprise, opposed that idea and instead favoured job creation to stimulate the economy, citing British economist John Maynard Keynes's theory that governments could increase employment by spending during times of low private investment. In a politically motivated move, King accepted their arguments and hence ran deficits in both 1938 and 1939.

==== Workers ====
Various reforms affecting working people were also introduced. The various provinces were assisted by the Federal Unemployment and Agricultural Assistance Act of 1938 and the Youth Training Act of 1939 to create training programs for young persons, while an amendment to the Criminal Code in May 1939 provided against refusal to hire, or dismissal, "solely because of a person's membership in a lawful trade-union or association".

The Vocational Training Co-ordination Act of 1942 provided an impetus to the provinces to set up facilities for postsecondary vocational training. Further, in 1948, the Industrial Relations and Disputes Investigation Act was passed; this act safeguarded the rights of workers to join unions while requiring employers to recognize unions chosen by their employees. A Fisheries Price Support Act was also introduced with the aim of providing fishermen with similar safeguards to industrial workers covered by minimum wage legislation.

==== Housing ====
The Federal Home Improvement Plan of 1937 provided subsidized rates of interest on rehabilitation loans to 66,900 homes, while the National Housing Act of 1938 made provision for the building of low-rent housing. Another Housing Act was later passed in 1944 with the intention of providing federally guaranteed loans or mortgages to individuals who wished to repair or construct dwellings through their own initiative.

==== Agriculture ====
While King opposed Bennett's Canadian Wheat Board in 1935, he accepted its operation. However, by 1938, the board had sold its holdings and King proposed returning to the open market. This angered Western Canadian farmers, who favoured a board that would give them a guaranteed minimum price, with the federal government covering any losses. Facing a public campaign to keep the board, King and his minister of agriculture, James Garfield Gardiner, reluctantly extended the board's life and offered a minimum price that would protect the farmers from further declines. Also, from 1935 onwards, measures were carried out to promote prairie farm rehabilitation. Also, in 1945 a Farm Improvement Loans Act was introduced that provided for bank loans for purposes such as land improvement and the repair and construction of farm buildings.

==== Crown corporations ====
In 1937, King's government established the Trans-Canada Air Lines (the precursor to Air Canada), as a subsidiary of the crown corporation, Canadian National Railways. It was created to provide air service to all regions of Canada.

In 1938, King's government nationalized the Bank of Canada into a crown corporation.

=== Media reforms ===
In 1936, the Canadian Radio Broadcasting Commission (CRBC) became the Canadian Broadcasting Corporation (CBC), a crown corporation. The CBC had a better organizational structure, more secure funding through the use of a licence fee on receiving sets (initially set at $2.50), and less vulnerability to political pressure. When Bennett's Conservatives were governing and the Liberals were in Opposition, the Liberals accused the network of being biased towards the Conservatives. During the 1935 election campaign, the CRBC broadcast a series of 15 minutes soap operas called Mr. Sage which were critical of King and the Liberal Party. Decried as political propaganda, the incident was one factor in King's decision to replace the CRBC.

In 1938, King's government invited British documentary maker John Grierson to study the situation of the government's film production (which at that time was the responsibility of the Canadian Government Motion Picture Bureau). King believed that Canadian cinema deserved an increased presence in Canadian theatres. This report prompted the National Film Act, which created the National Film Board of Canada in 1939. It was created to produce and distribute films serving the national interest and was intended specifically to make Canada better known both domestically and internationally. Gierson was appointed the first film commissioner in October 1939.

=== Relationship with provinces ===
After 1936, the prime minister lost patience when Western Canadians preferred radical alternatives such as the CCF (Co-operative Commonwealth Federation) and Social Credit to his middle-of-the-road liberalism. Indeed, he came close to writing off the region with his comment that the prairie dust bowl was "part of the U.S. desert area. I doubt if it will be of any real use again." Instead he paid more attention to the industrial regions and the needs of Ontario and Quebec, particularly with respect to the proposed St. Lawrence Seaway project with the United States.

In 1937, Maurice Duplessis, the conservative Union Nationale premier of Quebec, passed the Padlock Law (the Act to Protect the Province Against Communistic Propaganda), which intimidated labour leaders by threatening to lock up their offices for any alleged communist activities. King's government, which had already repealed the section of the Criminal Code banning unlawful associations, considered disallowing this bill. However, King's cabinet minister, Ernest Lapointe, believed this would harm the Liberal Party's electoral chances in Quebec. King and his English-Canadian ministers accepted Lapointe's view; as King wrote in his diary in July 1938, "we were prepared to accept what really should not, in the name of liberalism, be tolerated for one moment."

=== Germany and Hitler ===
In March 1936, in response to the German remilitarization of the Rhineland, King had the High Commission of Canada in the United Kingdom inform the British government that if Britain went to war with Germany over the Rhineland issue, Canada would remain neutral. In June 1937, during an Imperial Conference in London of the prime ministers of every dominion, King informed Britain's prime minister Neville Chamberlain that Canada would only go to war if Britain were directly attacked, and that if the British were to become involved in a continental war then Chamberlain was not to expect Canadian support.

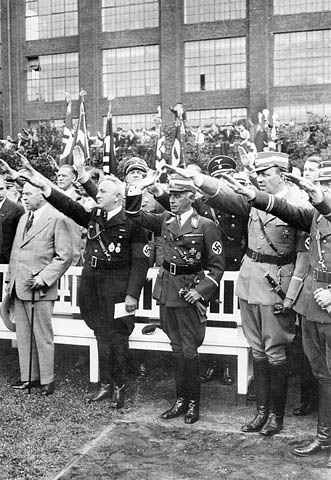
King (far left) at a ceremony in Berlin, Nazi Germany, 1937

In 1937, King visited Nazi Germany and met with Adolf Hitler. Possessing a religious yearning for direct insight into the hidden mysteries of life and the universe, and strongly influenced by the operas of Richard Wagner (who was also Hitler's favourite composer), King decided Hitler was akin to mythical Wagnerian heroes within whom good and evil were struggling. He thought that good would eventually triumph and Hitler would redeem his people and lead them to a harmonious, uplifting future. These spiritual attitudes not only guided Canada's relations with Hitler but gave the prime minister the comforting sense of a higher mission, that of helping to lead Hitler to peace. King commented in his journal that "he is really one who truly loves his fellow-men, and his country, and would make any sacrifice for their good". King forecast that:

The world will yet come to see a very great man–mystic in Hitler ... I cannot abide in Nazism – the regimentation – cruelty – oppression of Jews – attitude towards religion, etc., but Hitler ... will rank some day with Joan of Arc among the deliverers of his people.

In late 1938, during the great crisis in Europe over Czechoslovakia that culminated in the Munich Agreement, Canadians were divided. Francophones insisted on neutrality, as did some top advisers like Oscar D. Skelton. Anglophones stood behind Britain and were willing to fight Germany. King, who served as his own secretary of state for external affairs (foreign minister), said privately that if he had to choose he would not be neutral, but he made no public statement. All of Canada was relieved that the Munich Agreement, while sacrificing the sovereignty of Czechoslovakia, seemed to bring peace.

Under King's administration, the Canadian government, responding to strong public opinion, especially in Quebec, refused to expand immigration opportunities for Jewish refugees from Europe. In June 1939 Canada, along with Cuba and the United States, refused to allow entry for the 900 Jewish refugees aboard the passenger ship MS St. Louis. King's government was widely criticized for its antisemitic policies and refusal to admit Jewish refugees. Most famously, when Frederick Blair, an immigration official in King's party, was asked how many Jewish refugees Canada would admit after World War II, he replied "None is too many". This policy was wholly supported by King and his political allies.

=== Second World War ===
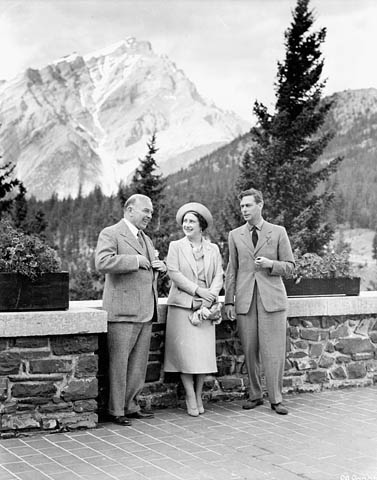
(From right to left) King George VI, Queen Elizabeth, and Prime Minister Mackenzie King in Banff, Alberta, 1939

King accompanied the Royal Couple—King George VI and Queen Elizabeth—throughout their 1939 cross-Canada tour, as well as on their American visit, a few months before the start of World War II.

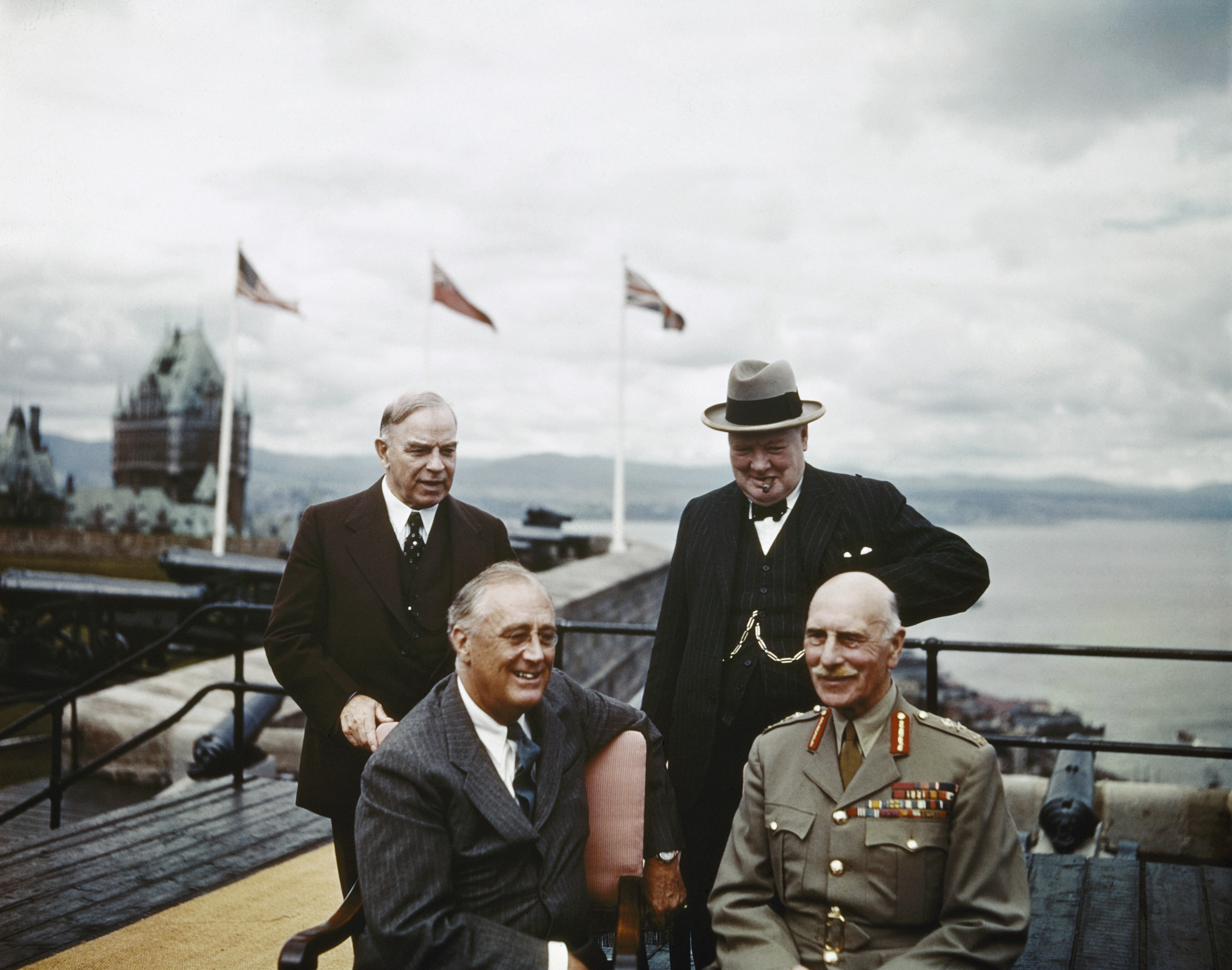
King (back left) with (counterclockwise from King) Franklin D. Roosevelt, Governor General the Earl of Athlone and Winston Churchill during the Quebec Conference in 1943

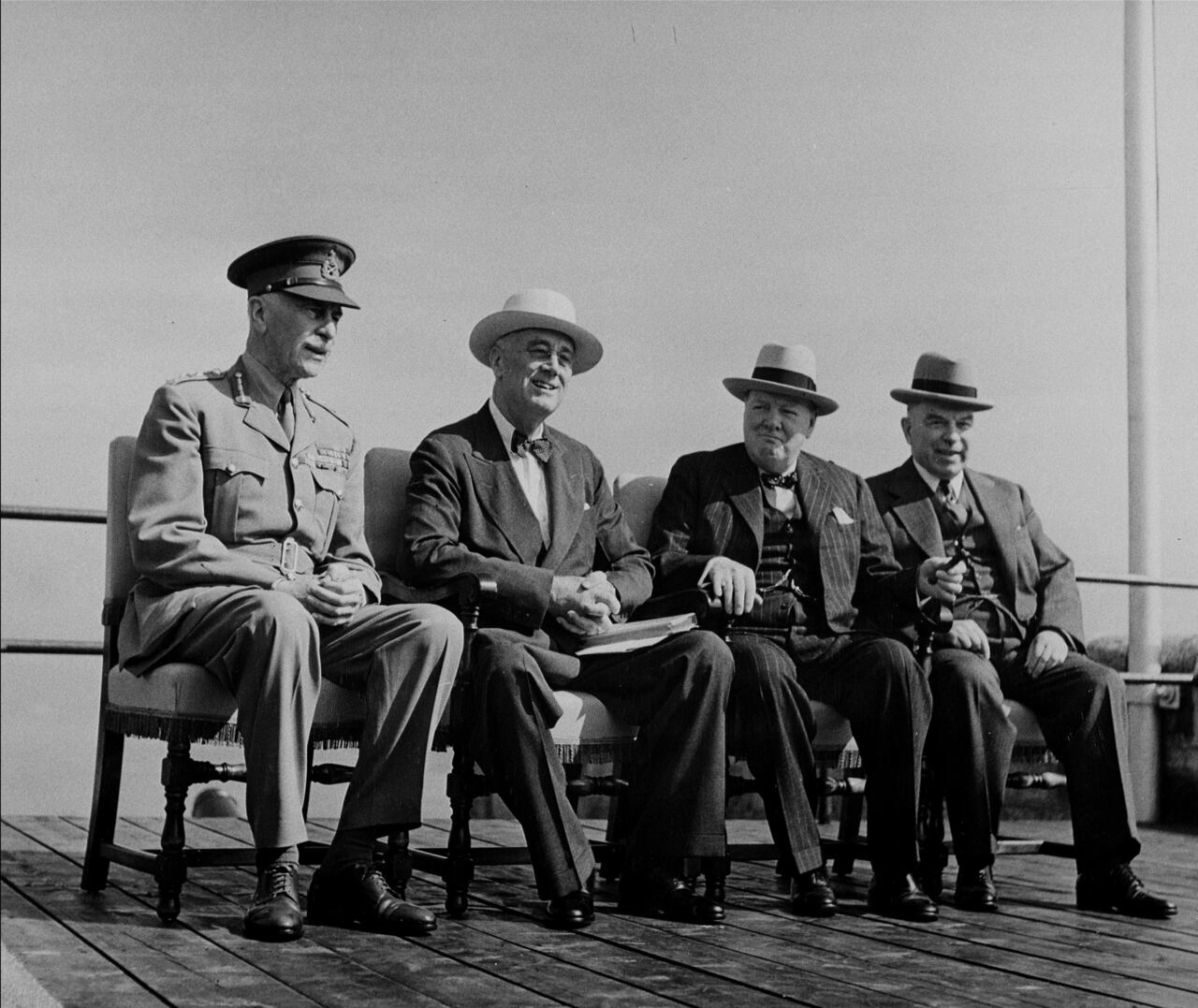
King (far right) together with (from left to right) Governor General the Earl of Athlone, Franklin D. Roosevelt and Winston Churchill at the Octagon Conference, Quebec City, September 1944

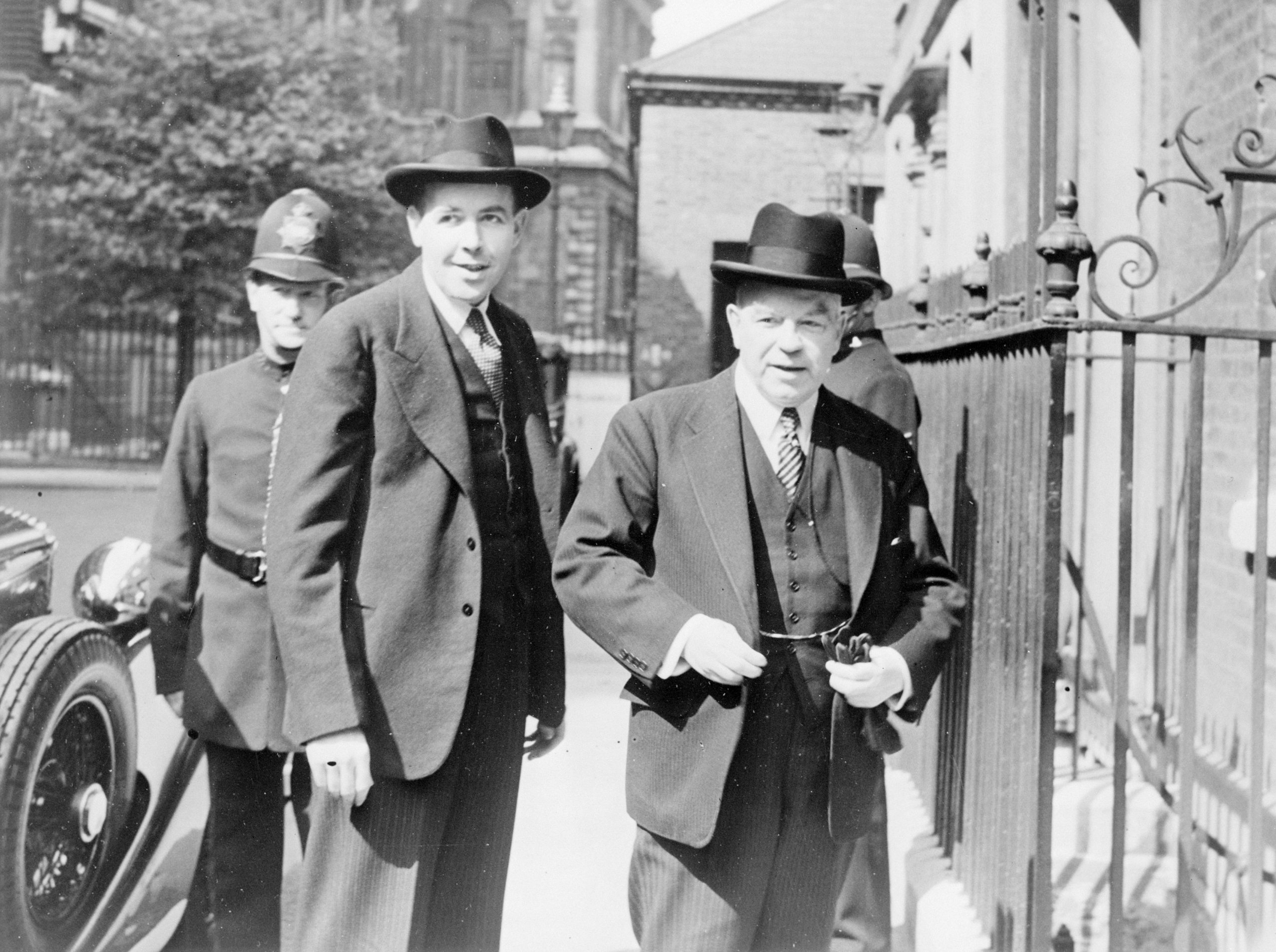
Canadian diplomat Norman Robertson and Mackenzie King, 1944

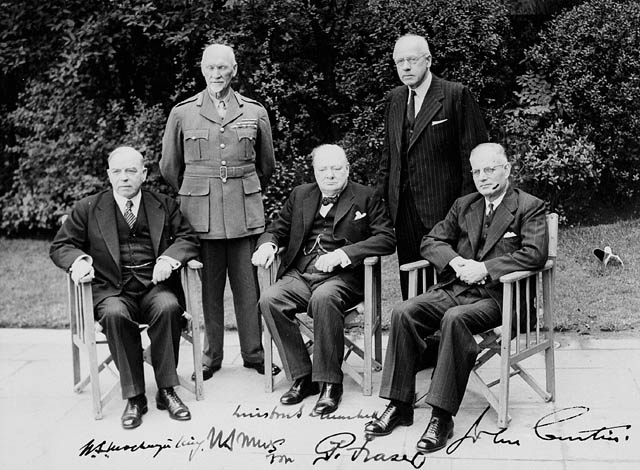
King, sitting left, at the 1944 Commonwealth Prime Ministers' Conference

==== Declaration of war ====
According to historian Norman Hillmer, as British prime minister Neville Chamberlain "negotiated in Munich with Adolf Hitler in September 1938, Mackenzie King, Canada's Prime Minister, grew agitated." King realized the likelihood of World War II and began mobilizing on August 25, 1939, with full mobilization on September 1, 1939, the day Germany invaded Poland. In 1914, at the beginning of World War I, Canada had been at war by virtue of King George V's declaration, issued solely on the advice of the British government. In 1939, King asserted Canada's autonomy and convened the House of Commons on September 7, nearly a month ahead of schedule, to discuss the government's intention to enter the war. King affirmed Canadian autonomy by saying that the Canadian Parliament would make the final decision on the issue of going to war. He reassured the pro-British Canadians that Parliament would surely decide that Canada would be at Britain's side if Great Britain was drawn into a major war. At the same time, he reassured those who were suspicious of British influence in Canada by promising that Canada would not participate in British colonial wars. His Quebec lieutenant, Ernest Lapointe, promised French Canadians that the government would not introduce conscription for overseas service; individual participation would be voluntary. These promises made it possible for Parliament to agree almost unanimously to declare war on September 9. On September 10, King, through his high commissioner in London, issued a request to King George VI, asking him, in his capacity as King of Canada, to declare Canada at war against Germany.

==== Foreign policy ====
To re-arm Canada, King built the Royal Canadian Air Force as a viable military power, while at the same time keeping it separate from Britain's Royal Air Force. He was instrumental in obtaining the British Commonwealth Air Training Plan Agreement, which was signed in Ottawa in December 1939, binding Canada, Britain, New Zealand and Australia to a program that eventually trained half the airmen from those four nations in the Second World War.

King linked Canada more and more closely to the United States, signing an agreement with Roosevelt at Ogdensburg, New York, in August 1940 that provided for the close cooperation of Canadian and American forces, despite the fact that the U.S. remained officially neutral until the bombing of Pearl Harbor on December 7, 1941. During the war the Americans took virtual control of the Yukon in building the Alaska Highway, and major airbases in Newfoundland, at that time under British governance.

King—and Canada—were largely ignored by British prime minister Winston Churchill, despite Canada's major role in supplying food, raw materials, munitions, and money to the hard-pressed British economy, training airmen for the Commonwealth, guarding the western half of the North Atlantic Ocean against German U-boats, and providing combat troops for the invasions of Italy, France and Germany in 1943–45. King proved highly successful in mobilizing the economy for war, with impressive results in industrial and agricultural output. The depression ended, prosperity returned, and Canada's economy expanded significantly.

During the war, Canada rapidly expanded its diplomatic missions abroad. While Canada hosted two major Allied conferences in Quebec in 1943 and 1944, neither King nor his senior generals and admirals were invited to take part in any of the discussions.

==== Political affairs ====
King's government made an unprecedented intervention in the 1939 Quebec general election to defeat anti-war Premier Maurice Duplessis's Union Nationale and ensure victory for the pro-war Quebec Liberals under Adélard Godbout. Three of King's Cabinet ministers from Quebec (Ernest Lapointe, Arthur Cardin, and Charles Gavan Power) threatened to resign if Duplessis won re-election, claiming that no one would be left to stand up for Quebec in the Cabinet if conscription become an issue again. In his diary, King called Duplessis "diabolic" and a "little Hitler", believing Duplessis's aim was to provoke such a crisis between French Canada and English Canada that Quebec would leave Confederation. King used the powers of censorship under the War Measures Act to keep Duplessis from speaking on the radio. The Quebec Liberals won a landslide victory.

King rejected any notion of a government of national unity like the Unionist Government during World War I. When the Legislative Assembly of Ontario passed a resolution criticizing King's government for not fighting the war "in the vigorous manner the people of Canada desire to see", King dissolved the federal parliament, triggering a federal election for March 26, 1940. He held it despite the ongoing war, unlike Britain, which formed a government of national unity and did not hold a wartime election. King won a second consecutive landslide victory, winning 179 seats – 6 more than in 1935. This was the Liberals' most successful result as of 2023 (in terms of proportion of seats). The Official Opposition party, the Conservatives, won the same number of seats as R. B. Bennett did in the 1935 election. King's relationship with Liberal Ontario Premier Mitchell Hepburn was damaged due to Hepburn spearheading the resolution criticizing the war effort.

King promoted engineer and businessman C. D. Howe to senior cabinet positions during the war. King also suffered two cabinet setbacks; his defence minister, Norman McLeod Rogers, died in 1940 and his Quebec lieutenant and minister of justice and attorney general, Ernest Lapointe, died in 1941. King successfully sought out the reluctant Louis St. Laurent, a leading Quebec lawyer, to enter the House of Commons and to take over Lapointe's role. St. Laurent became King's right-hand man.

==== Wartime expenditure ====
On June 24, 1940, King's government presented the first $1 billion budget in Canadian history. It included $700 million in war expenses compared to $126 million in the 1939–1940 fiscal year; however, due to the war, the overall economy was the strongest in Canadian history.

==== Internment of Japanese-Canadians ====
Following the attack on Pearl Harbor in December 1941, Japanese Canadians were categorized by Canada as enemy aliens under the War Measures Act, which began to remove their personal rights. Starting on December 8, 1941, 1,200 Japanese-Canadian-owned fishing vessels were impounded as a "defence measure." On January 14, 1942, the federal government passed an order calling for the removal of male Japanese nationals between 18 and 45 years of age from a designated protected area of 100 miles inland from the British Columbia coast, enacted a ban against Japanese-Canadian fishing during the war, banned shortwave radios and controlled the sale of gasoline and dynamite to Japanese Canadians. Japanese nationals removed from the coast after the January 14 order were sent to road camps around Jasper, Alberta. Three weeks later, on February 19, 1942, US president Franklin D. Roosevelt signed Executive Order 9066, which called for the removal of 110,000 people of Japanese ancestry from the American coastline. A historian of internment, Ann Sunahara, argues that "the American action sealed the fate of Japanese Canadians."

On February 24, the federal government passed order-in-council PC 1468 which allowed for the removal of "all persons of Japanese origin" This order-in-council allowed the Minister of Justice the broad powers of removing people from any protected area in Canada, but was meant for Japanese Canadians on the Pacific coast in particular. On February 25, the federal government announced that Japanese Canadians were being moved for reasons of national security. In all, some 27,000 people were detained without charge or trial, and their property confiscated. Others were deported to Japan. King and his Cabinet received conflicting intelligence reports about the potential threat from the Japanese. Major General Ken Stuart told Ottawa, "I cannot see that the Japanese Canadians constitute the slightest menace to national security." In contrast, BC's attorney general, Gordon Sylvester Wismer reported that, while he had "the greatest respect for" and "hesitated to disagree with" the RCMP, "every law enforcement agency in this province, including ... the military officials charged with local internal security, are unanimous that a grave menace exists."

==== Expansion of scientific research ====
King's government greatly expanded the role of the National Research Council of Canada during the war, moving into full-scale research in nuclear physics and commercial use of nuclear power in the following years. King, with C. D. Howe acting as point man, moved the nuclear group from Montreal to Chalk River, Ontario in 1944, with the establishment of Chalk River Nuclear Laboratories and the residential town of Deep River, Ontario. Canada became a world leader in this field, with the NRX reactor becoming operational in 1947; at the time, NRX was the only operational nuclear reactor outside the United States.

==== Conscription ====
King's promise not to impose conscription contributed to the defeat of Maurice Duplessis's Union Nationale Quebec provincial government in 1939 and the Liberals' re-election in the 1940 election. But after the fall of France in 1940, Canada introduced conscription for home service (conscription meant for the defence of Canada only). Only volunteers were to be sent overseas. King wanted to avoid a repeat of the Conscription Crisis of 1917. By 1942, the military was pressing King hard to send conscripts to Europe. In 1942, King held a national plebiscite on the issue, asking the nation to relieve him of the commitment he had made during the election campaign. In the House of Commons on June 10, 1942, he said that his policy was "not necessarily conscription but conscription if necessary".

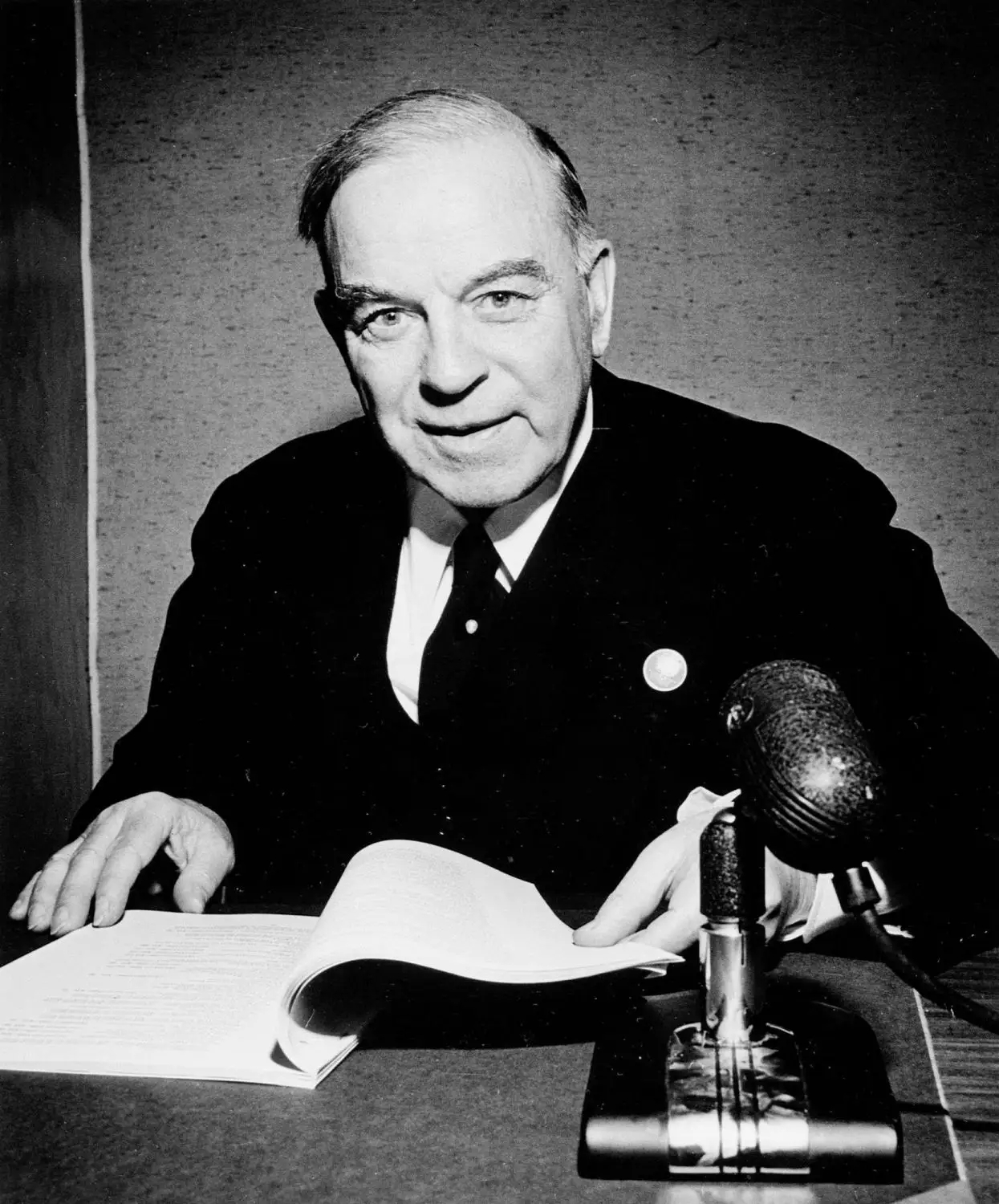
King making his address to Canada on VE-Day

French Canadians voted against conscription, with over 70 percent opposed, but an overwhelming majority – over 80 percent – of English Canadians supported it. French and English conscripts were sent to fight in the Aleutian Islands in 1943 – technically North American soil and therefore not "overseas" – but the mix of Canadian volunteers and draftees found that the Japanese troops had fled before their arrival. Otherwise, King continued with a campaign to recruit volunteers, hoping to address the problem with the shortage of troops caused by heavy losses in the Dieppe Raid in 1942, in Italy in 1943, and after the Battle of Normandy in 1944. In November 1944, the government decided it was necessary to send conscripts for the war. This led to a brief political crisis (see Conscription Crisis of 1944) and a mutiny by conscripts posted in British Columbia, but the war ended a few months later. In all, 12,908 conscripts were sent to fight abroad, though only 2,463 saw combat.

=== Post-war Canada ===
==== 1945 election ====
With the war winding down, King called a federal election for June 11, 1945. The Liberals' election campaign was centered on a broad program of social security. Although King was hesitant for his government to expand its role in the economy and run deficits, he accepted it as these measures aligned with his concern for people struggling financially. There were political motives too; the Liberals needed to compete with the rising socialist Co-operative Commonwealth Federation (CCF) for votes. In addition, King promised to commit one division of volunteers to Operation Downfall, the planned invasion of Japan scheduled for late 1945-early 1946, whereas Progressive Conservative leader John Bracken promised conscription. Bracken's promise was unpopular and it thus benefited the Liberals.

The Liberals were knocked down from a massive majority government to a minority government. However, they were able to govern with a working majority with the support of eight "Independent Liberal" MPs (most of whom did not run as official Liberals because of their opposition to conscription). The Liberals' decline in support was partly attributed to the introduction of conscription, which was unpopular in many parts of Canada. As King was defeated in his own riding of Prince Albert, fellow Liberal William MacDiarmid, who was re-elected in the safe seat of Glengarry, resigned so that an August 6 by-election could be held, which was subsequently won by King. In the event, Japan surrendered before any troops were raised for the matter.

==== Foreign affairs, Cold War ====
King helped found the United Nations (UN) in 1945 and attended the opening meetings in San Francisco. Though he conceded that major powers such as the United States and the United Kingdom would dominate the organization, King argued that middle powers such as Canada should be given an influence on the UN based on their contributions to the settlement of disputes.

King moved Canada into the deepening Cold War in alliance with the U.S. and Britain. He dealt with the espionage revelations of Soviet cipher clerk Igor Gouzenko, who defected in Ottawa in September 1945, by quickly appointing a Royal Commission to investigate Gouzenko's allegations of a Canadian Communist spy-ring transmitting top-secret documents to Moscow. Justice Minister Louis St. Laurent dealt decisively with this crisis, the first of its type in Canada's history. St. Laurent succeeded King as external affairs minister in September 1946.

==== Domestic achievements ====
After the war, King quickly dismantled wartime controls. Unlike World War I, press censorship ended with the hostilities.

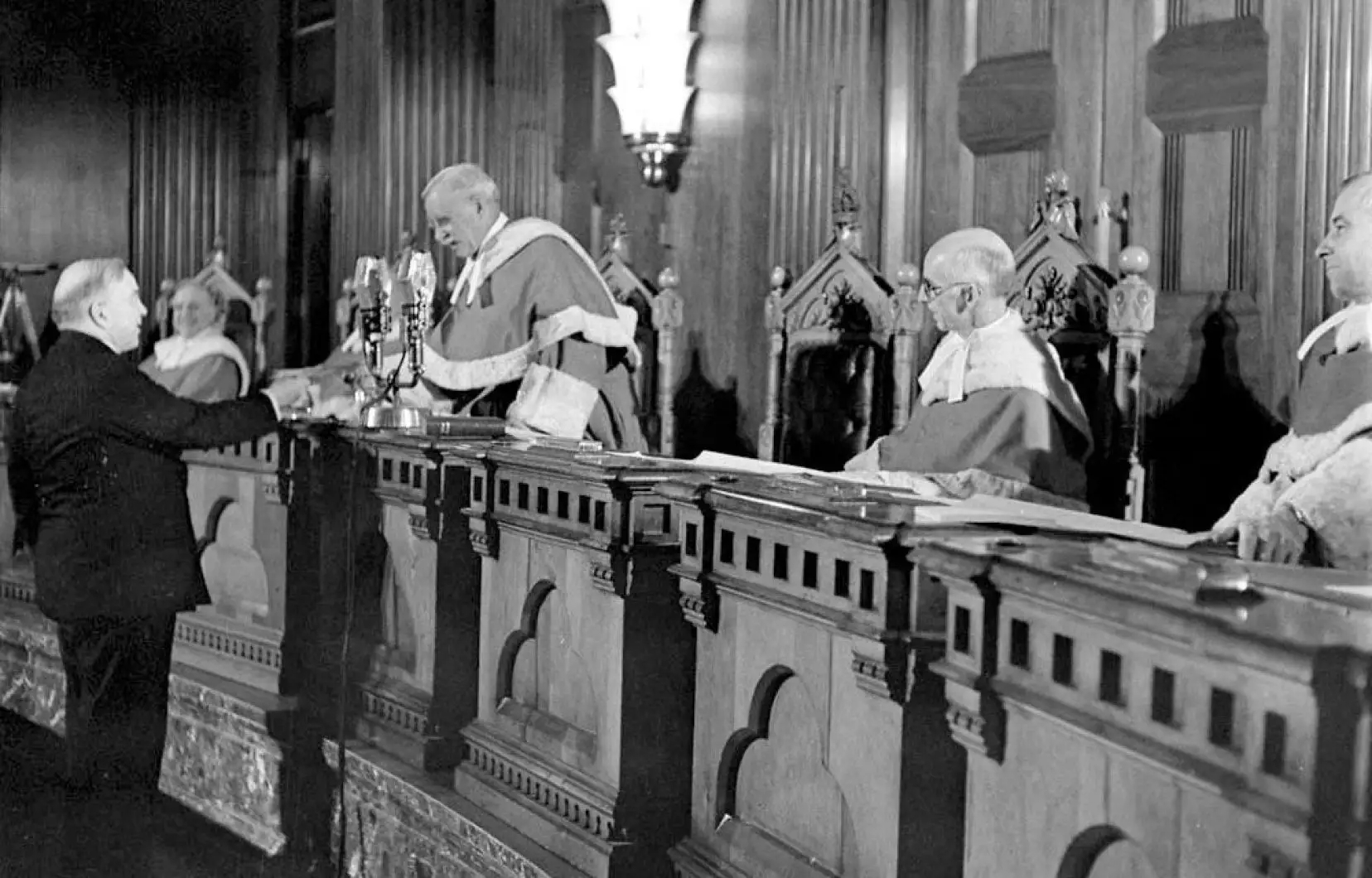
King (far-left) becomes the first person to take the Oath of Citizenship, from Chief Justice Thibaudeau Rinfret, in the Supreme Court, January 3, 1947

King's government introduced the Canadian Citizenship Act in 1946, which officially created the notion of "Canadian citizens". Prior to this, Canadians were considered British subjects living in Canada. On January 3, 1947, King received Canadian citizenship certificate number 0001.

King also laid the groundwork for the Dominion of Newfoundland's later entry into Canadian Confederation, stating, "Newfoundlanders are no strangers to Canada, nor are Canadians strangers to Newfoundland." Pro-Confederation Newfoundlanders Frederick Gordon Bradley and Joey Smallwood argued that joining Canada would raise the standard of living for Newfoundlanders; Britain also favoured Confederation. A runoff vote was held on July 22, 1948, and 52.3 percent of voters decided that Newfoundland should enter Canada. After, Smallwood negotiated the terms of entry with King. Newfoundland entered Confederation on March 31, 1949, becoming Canada's tenth province.

=== Retirement ===
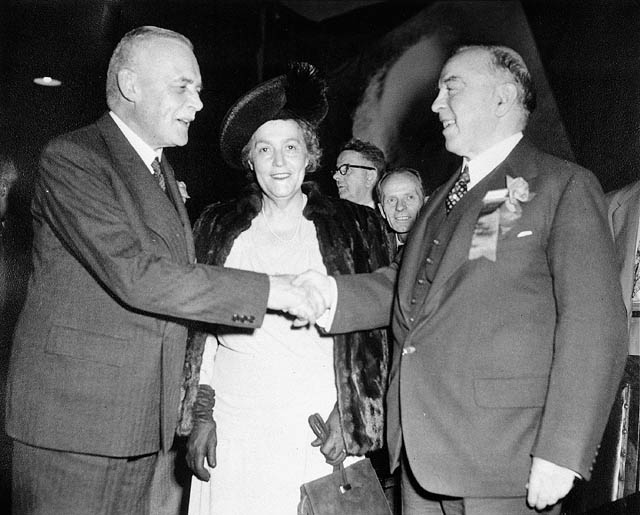
Outgoing Prime Minister King with incoming Prime Minister Louis St. Laurent, August 7, 1948

With his health declining, King declared in May 1948 that he would not be Liberal leader going in the next election. The August 1948 convention (held exactly 29 years after King became Liberal leader) picked St. Laurent, King's personal choice, as the new leader of the Liberal Party. Three months later, on November 15, King retired after 21 1/2 years as prime minister. King was the longest-serving prime minister in Canadian history; he also served in the most parliaments (six, in three non-consecutive periods) as prime minister.

== Retirement and death (1948–1950) ==
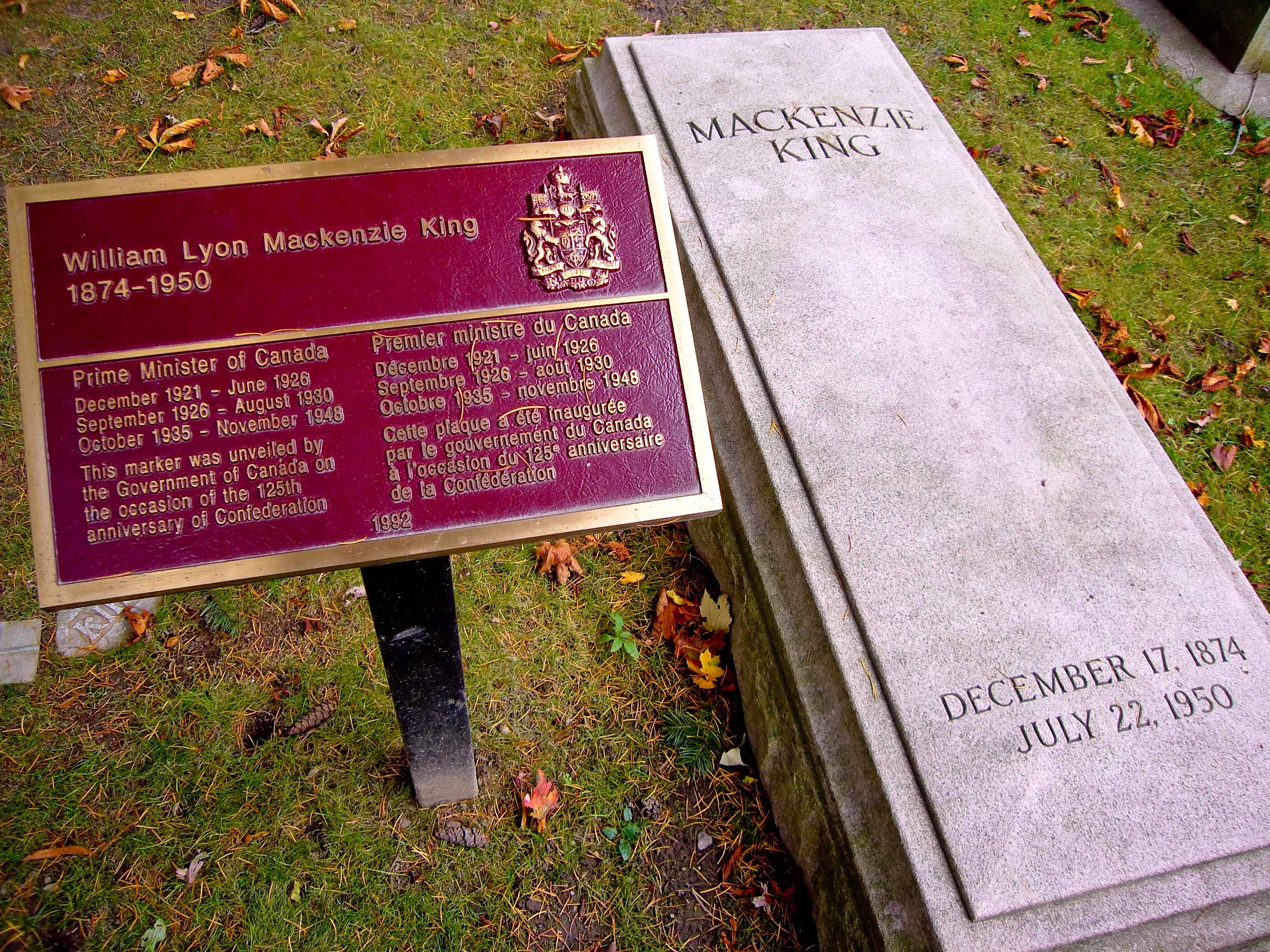
King's grave and memorial plaque

King had plans to write his memoirs. However, he did not enjoy a lengthy retirement and died on July 22, 1950, at his country estate in Kingsmere from pneumonia. He is buried in Mount Pleasant Cemetery, Toronto.

== Personal style and character ==
King lacked a commanding presence or oratorical skills; he did not shine on the radio or in newsreels. There was scant charisma. Cold and tactless in human relations, he had allies but very few close personal friends. His allies were annoyed by his constant intrigues.

Scholars attribute King's long tenure as party leader to his wide range of skills that were appropriate to Canada's needs. King kept a very candid diary from 1893, when he was still an undergraduate, until a few days before his death in 1950; the volumes, stacked in a row, span a length of over seven metres and comprise over 50,000 manuscript pages of typed transcribed text. One biographer called these diaries "the most important single political document in twentieth-century Canadian history," for they explain motivations of the Canadian war efforts and describe other events in detail.

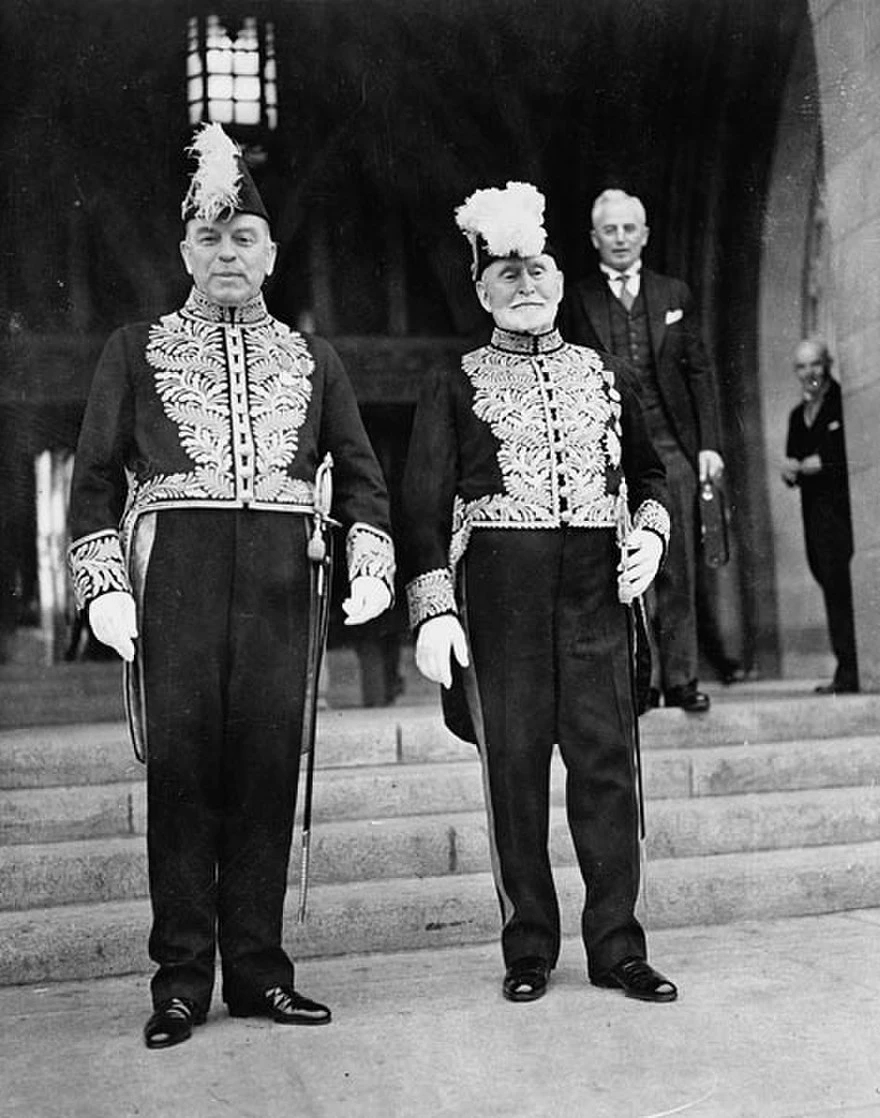
King and Senator Raoul Dandurand in state clothing, 1939.

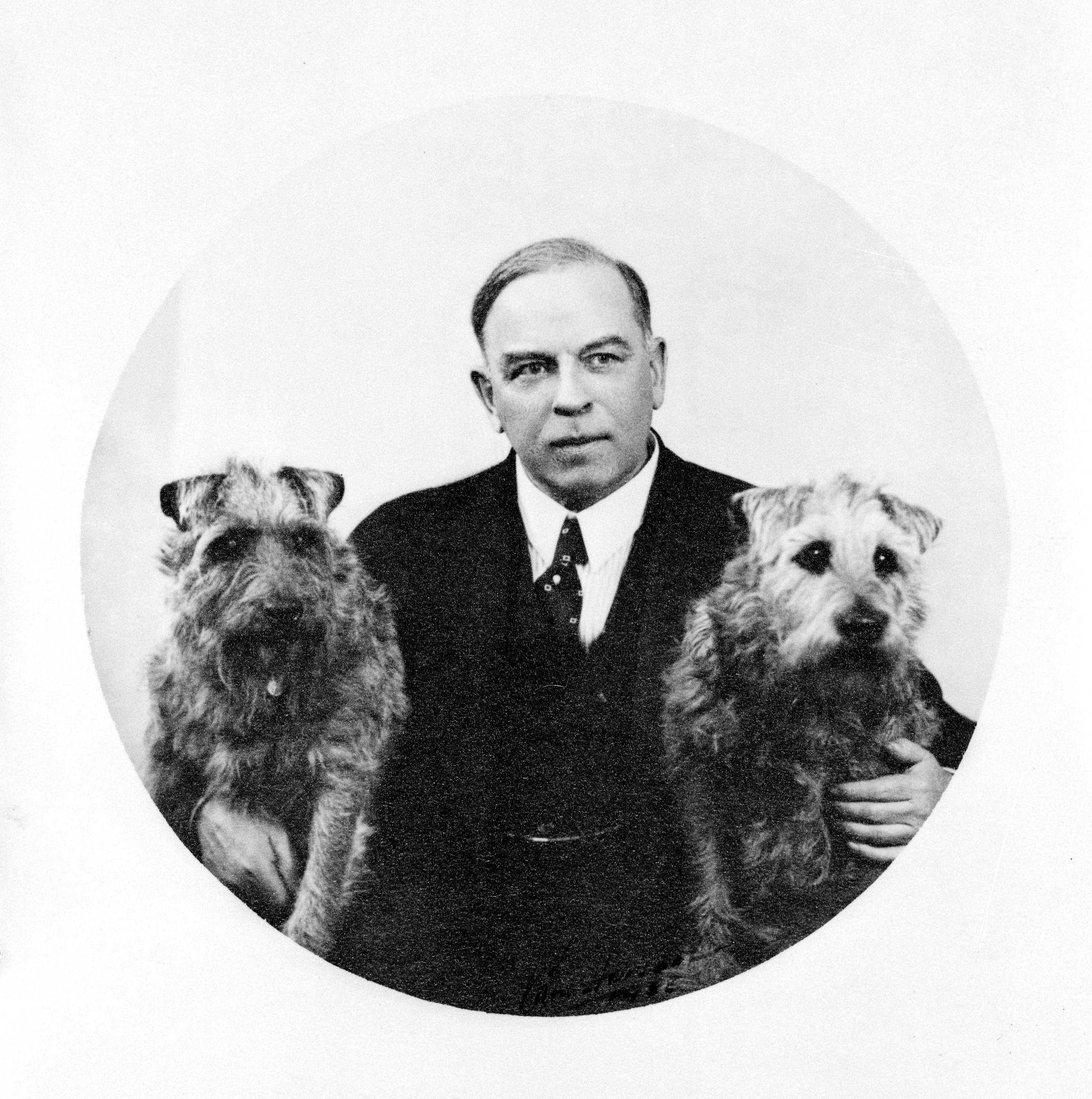
King with his two dogs, 1938

=== Esotericism ===
King's occult interests were kept secret during his years in office, and only became publicized after his death when his diaries were opened. Readers were amazed and for some, King was saddled with the moniker "Weird Willie." King communed with spirits, using seances with paid mediums. Thereby, he claimed to have communicated with Leonardo da Vinci, Wilfrid Laurier, his dead mother, his grandfather, and several of his dead dogs, as well as the spirit of the late US president Franklin D. Roosevelt. Some historians argue that he sought personal reassurance from the spirit world, more than political advice. After his death, one of his mediums said that she had not realized that he was a politician. King did inquire whether his party would win the 1935 election, one of the few times politics came up during his seances. However, Allan Levine argues that sometimes he did pay attention to the political implications of his seances: "All of his spiritualist experiences, his other superstitions and his multi-paranoid reactions imprinted on his consciousness, shaping his thoughts and feelings in a thousand different ways."

Historians have seen in his spiritualism and occult activities a penchant for forging unities from antitheses, thus having latent political import. Historian C.P. Stacey, in his 1976 book A Very Double Life examined King's secret life in detail, argued that King did not allow his beliefs to influence his decisions on political matters. Stacey wrote that King entirely gave up his interests in the occult and spiritualism during World War II. In his two-volume biography The Spiritualist Prime Minister: Mackenzie King and the New Revelation and The Spiritualist Prime Minister: Mackenzie King and His Mediums, Anton Wagner documents that King maintained his spiritualist beliefs and occult practices until his death in 1950. Wagner maintains that King’s spiritualism contributed to his political achievements as Canada’s longest-serving prime minister.

King never married, but had several close female friends, including Joan Patteson, a married woman with whom he spent some of his leisure time; sometimes she served as hostess at his dinner parties. He did not have a wife who could be the hostess all the time and handle the many social obligations that he tried to downplay. Editor Charles Bowman reports that, "He felt the lack of a wife, particularly when social duties called for a hostess."

Some historians have interpreted passages in his diaries as suggesting that King regularly had sexual relations with prostitutes. Others, also basing their claims on passages of his diaries, have suggested that King was in love with Lord Tweedsmuir, whom he had chosen for appointment as Governor General in 1935.

== Legacy ==
Historian George Stanley argues that King's wartime policies, "may not have been exciting or satisfying, but they were effective and successful. That is why, practically alone among wartime governments, he continued to enjoy public support after as well as during the Second World War." Historian Jack Granatstein evaluates the King government's economic performance. He reports, "Canada's economic management was generally judged the most successful of all the countries engaged in the war."

Historian Christopher Moore says, "King had made 'Parliament will decide' his maxim, and he trotted it out whenever he wished to avoid a decision." King was keenly sensitive to the nuances of public policy; he was a workaholic with a shrewd and penetrating intelligence and a profound understanding of the complexities of Canadian society. His strength was apparent when he synthesized, built support for, and passed measures that had reached a level of broad national support. Advances in the welfare state were an example. His successors, especially Diefenbaker, Pearson, and Trudeau built the welfare state which he had advanced during the Second World War into the modern cradle-to-grave system.

Historian H. Blair Neatby wrote, "Mackenzie King has continued to intrigue Canadians. Critics argue that his political longevity was achieved by evasions and indecision, and that he failed to provide creative leadership. His defenders argue that he gradually changed Canada, a difficult country to govern, while keeping the nation united."

King was ranked as the greatest Canadian prime minister by a survey of Canadian historians. King was named a Person of National Historic Significance in 1968.

== Memorials ==
King's likeness has been used on the Canadian fifty-dollar note since 1975.

King left no published political memoirs, although his private diaries were extensively detailed. His main published work remains his 1918 book Industry and Humanity.

Following the publication of King's diaries in the 1970s, several fictional works about him were published by Canadian writers. These included Elizabeth Gourlay's novel Isabel, Allan Stratton's play Rexy and Heather Robertson's trilogy Willie: A Romance (1983), Lily: A Rhapsody in Red (1986), and Igor: A Novel of Intrigue (1989).

In 1998, there was controversy over King's exclusion from a memorial to the Quebec Conference, which was attended by King, Roosevelt, and Churchill. The monument was commissioned by the sovereigntist Parti Québécois government of Quebec, which justified the decision on their interpretation that King was acting merely as a host for the meeting between Roosevelt and Churchill. Canadian federalists, however, accused the government of Quebec of trying to advance their own political agenda.

OC Transpo has a Transitway station named Mackenzie King due to its location on the Mackenzie King Bridge. It is adjacent to the Rideau Centre in downtown Ottawa, Ontario.

The bridge across the Rideau Canal in downtown Ottawa, built following World War II, is named in his honour to recognize his contributions to the land planning of the city of Ottawa.

King bequeathed his private country retreat in Kingsmere, Quebec, near Ottawa, to the Government of Canada and most of the estate was incorporated into the federally managed Gatineau Park. King's summer home at Kingsmere, called "The Farm", now serves as the official residence of the Speaker of the House of Commons of Canada. The Farm and its grounds are located within Gatineau Park but are not open to the public.

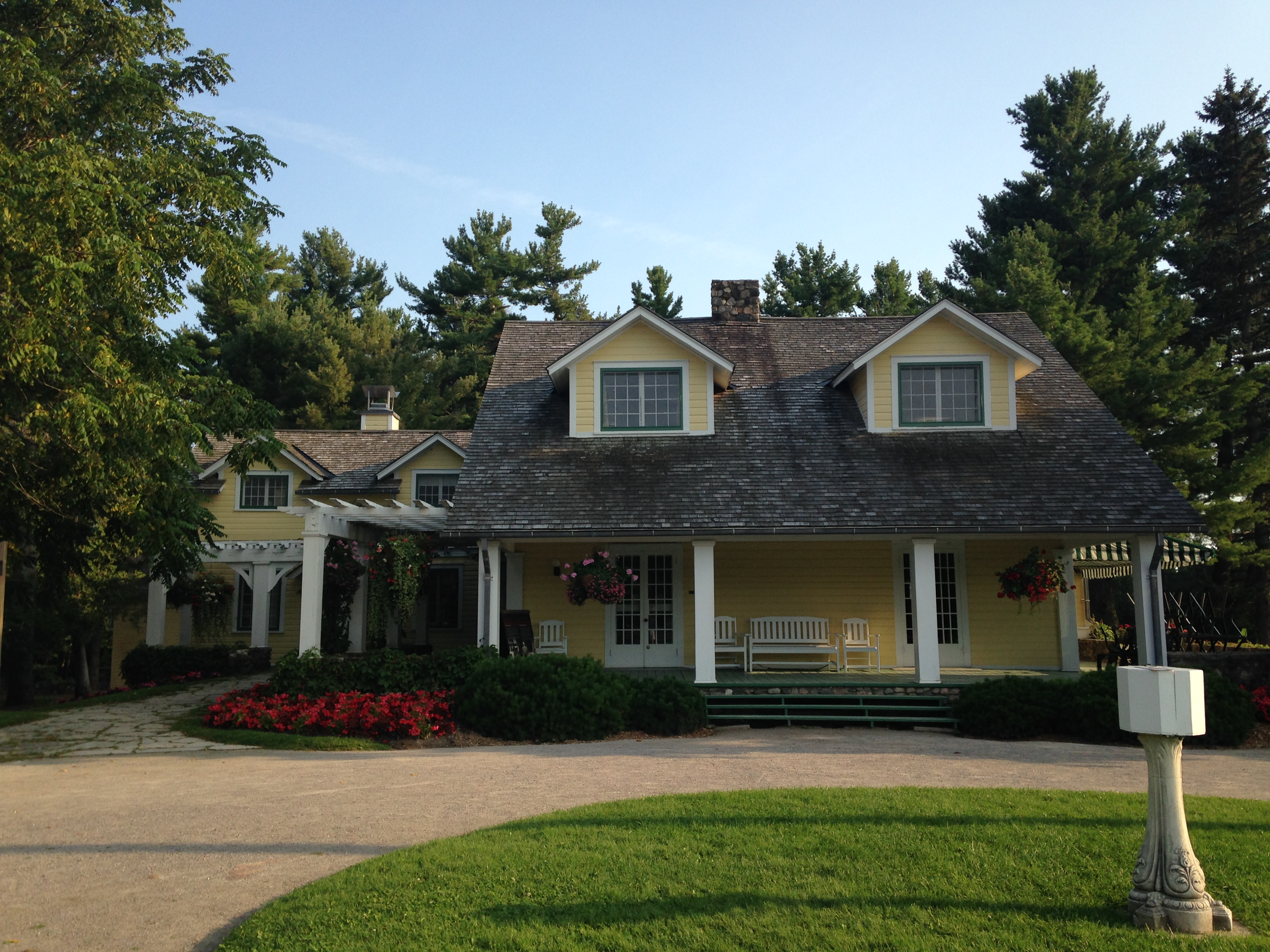
Home of William Lyon Mackenzie King in Kingsmere, Quebec

The Woodside National Historic Site in Kitchener, Ontario was King's boyhood home. The estate has over 4.65 hectares of garden and parkland for exploring and relaxing, and the house has been restored to reflect life during King's era. There is a MacKenzie King Public School in the Heritage Park neighbourhood in Kitchener. Kitchener was known as Berlin until 1916.

King was mentioned in the book Alligator Pie by Dennis Lee, appearing as the subject of a nonsensical children's poem, which reads "William Lyon Mackenzie King / He sat in the middle and played with string / He loved his mother like anything / William Lyon Mackenzie King."

King is a prominent character in Donald Jack's novel Me Too, set in Ottawa in the 1920s.

A character who appeared twice in the popular 1990s Canadian television series Due South was named "Mackenzie King" in obvious reference.

King was portrayed by Sean McCann in Donald Brittain's 1988 television miniseries The King Chronicle, and by Dan Beirne in Matthew Rankin's 2019 film The Twentieth Century.

== Honours ==

Ribbon	Description	Notes
	Order of Merit (OM)	17 November 1947.
	Companion of the Order of St Michael and St George (CMG)	
	King George V Silver Jubilee Medal	1936; As the prime minister of Canada and an elected member of the House of Commons of Canada, The Right Honourable William Lyon Mackenzie King, P.C., C.M.G., would be awarded the medal as a member of the Canadian order of precedence.
	King George VI Coronation Medal	1937; As the prime minister of Canada and an elected member of the House of Commons of Canada, the Right Honourable William Lyon Mackenzie King, P.C., C.M.G., would be awarded the medal as a member of the Canadian order of precedence.
	Grand Croix de l'Ordre national de la Légion d'honneur	
	Grand croix de l'Ordre de la couronne de Chêne	
	Grand cordon de l'Ordre de Léopold	

== Honorary degrees ==
Honorary degrees
Location	Date	School	Degree
Ontario	1919	Queen's University	Doctor of Laws (LL.D)
Ontario	1923	University of Toronto	Doctor of Laws (LL.D)
Connecticut	1924	Yale University	Doctor of Laws (LL.D)
Virginia	1948	College of William and Mary	Doctor of Laws (LL.D)
Ontario	3 June 1950	University of Western Ontario	Doctor of Laws (LL.D)

== Supreme Court appointments ==
King chose the following jurists to be appointed as justices of the Supreme Court of Canada:

- Arthur Cyrille Albert Malouin (January 30, 1924 – October 1, 1924)
- Francis Alexander Anglin (as Chief Justice, September 16, 1924 – February 28, 1933; appointed a Puisne Justice under Prime Minister Laurier, February 23, 1909)
- Edmund Leslie Newcombe (September 16, 1924 – December 9, 1931)
- Thibaudeau Rinfret (October 1, 1924 – June 22, 1954; appointed as Chief Justice January 8, 1944)
- John Henderson Lamont (April 2, 1927 – March 10, 1936)
- Robert Smith (May 18, 1927 – December 7, 1933)
- Lawrence Arthur Dumoulin Cannon (January 14, 1930 – December 25, 1939)
- Albert Blellock Hudson (March 24, 1936 – January 6, 1947)
- Robert Taschereau (February 9, 1940 – September 1, 1967)
- Ivan Rand (April 22, 1943 – April 27, 1959)
- Roy Lindsay Kellock (October 3, 1944 – January 15, 1958)
- James Wilfred Estey (October 6, 1944 – January 22, 1956)
- Charles Holland Locke (June 3, 1947 – September 16, 1962)

== Electoral record ==
Parliament of Canada
Preceded by Joseph E. Seagram	Member of Parliament for Waterloo North; 1908–1911	Succeeded by William George Weichel
Preceded by Joseph Read	Member of Parliament for Prince; 1919–1921	Succeeded by Alfred E. MacLean
Preceded by John Armstrong	Member of Parliament for York North; 1921–1925	Succeeded by Thomas Herbert Lennox
Preceded by Charles McDonald	Member of Parliament for Prince Albert; 1926–1945	Succeeded by Edward LeRoy Bowerman
Preceded by William MacDiarmid	Member of Parliament for Glengarry; 1945–1949	Succeeded by William J. Major
Political offices
New title	Minister of Labour; 1909–1911	Succeeded by Thomas Wilson Crothers
Preceded by Daniel McKenzie	Leader of the Opposition; 1919–1921	Succeeded by Arthur Meighen
Preceded by Arthur Meighen	Prime Minister of Canada; 1921–1926	Succeeded by Arthur Meighen
Preceded by Arthur Meighen	Secretary of State for External Affairs; 1921–1926	Succeeded by Arthur Meighen
Preceded by Arthur Meighen	President of the Privy Council; 1921–1926	Succeeded by Arthur Meighen
Preceded by Arthur Meighen	Leader of the Opposition; 1926	Succeeded by Arthur Meighen
Preceded by Arthur Meighen	Prime Minister of Canada; 1926–1930	Succeeded by R. B. Bennett
Preceded by Arthur Meighen	President of the Privy Council; 1926–1930	Succeeded by R. B. Bennett
Preceded by Arthur Meighen	Secretary of State for External Affairs; 1926–1930	Succeeded by R. B. Bennett
Preceded by R. B. Bennett	Leader of the Opposition; 1930–1935	Succeeded by R. B. Bennett
Preceded by R. B. Bennett	Secretary of State for External Affairs; 1935–1946	Succeeded by Louis St. Laurent
Preceded by R. B. Bennett	Prime Minister of Canada; 1935–1948	Succeeded by Louis St. Laurent
Preceded by R. B. Bennett	President of the Privy Council; 1935–1948	Succeeded by Louis St. Laurent
Government offices
New office	Deputy Minister of Labour; 1900–1908	Succeeded by Frederick Albert Acland
Party political offices
Preceded by Daniel McKenzie; Interim	Leader of the Liberal Party of Canada; 1919–1948	Succeeded by Louis St. Laurent
Preceded by Herbert Mowat	President of the General Reform Association of Ontario; 1911–1944	Succeeded by A.J. Young
Awards and achievements
Preceded by Fritz Kreisler	Cover of Time magazine February 9, 1925	Succeeded by Harry S. New
