= Patrick Purcell =

Canadian politician

Patrick Purcell (May 1, 1833 – May 1, 1891) was a Canadian railway contractor and political figure in Ontario. He represented Glengarry in the House of Commons of Canada as a Liberal member from 1887 to 1891.

He was born in Glengarry County, Upper Canada; his father was a native of Ireland and his mother came from Scotland. In 1852, Purcell married Isabella McDonald. He was a construction contractor and built St. Peter's Canal in Nova Scotia and sections of the Canadian Pacific Railway and Intercolonial Railway. Purcell was reeve of Charlottenburg Township in 1884.

After Purcell's death in 1891, he was buried east of Cornwall. Shortly afterwards, his body was removed from the grave by young men from the area but was later recovered after it was found floating in the Saint Lawrence River.
